= List of Zushi Games games =

This is a list of video games published and/or distributed by Zushi Games. It includes all of their titles that were published under their former name of Zoo Digital Publishing.

== Main titles ==
- Actua Pool (2007) Nintendo DS
- Adventures To Go (2009) PlayStation Portable
- Aero the Acro-Bat (2003) Game Boy Advance
- Alien Hominid (2005) Game Boy Advance, Mobile phone, PlayStation 2, Xbox
- The Aly & AJ Adventure (2008) Nintendo DS
- American Chopper (2004) PlayStation 2, Windows, Xbox
- American Chopper 2: The Full Throttle (2006) PlayStation 2, Xbox
- Arctic Tale (2008) Nintendo DS, Wii
- At the Races Presents Gallop Racer (2003) PlayStation 2
- ATV: Thunder Ridge Riders (2006) Game Boy Advance
- ATV: Thunder Ridge Riders & Monster Trucks Mayhem (2008) Nintendo DS
- B.C. Kings (2010) Windows
- B-17: Fortress in the Sky (2007) Nintendo DS
- Balls of Fury (2007) Nintendo DS, Wii
- Barnyard Blast: Swine of the Night (2008) PlayStation Portable
- Beanotown Racing (2003) Windows
- Betty Boop's Double Shift (2008) Nintendo DS
- Bicycle Casino (2005) Xbox
- Bigfoot: Collision Course (2009) Nintendo DS, Wii, Windows
- Big Mutha Truckers (2005) Game Boy Advance, Nintendo DS
- Blockids (2004) PlayStation
- BlowOut (2004) PlayStation 2, Windows
- Board Game Classics: Backgammon & Chess & Draughts (2005) Game Boy Advance
- Cabela's Big Game Hunter (2002) PlayStation 2
- Cabela's Big Game Hunter 2005 Adventures (2004) Game Boy Advance, PlayStation 2, Xbox
- Cabela's Big Game Hunter 2006 Trophy Season (2006) Windows
- Cabela's Dangerous Hunts (2004) PlayStation 2, Xbox
- Cabela's Dangerous Hunts 2 (2005) Windows
- Cabela's Outdoor Adventures (2006) PlayStation 2, Xbox
- Calvin Tucker's Redneck Jamboree (2009) Wii
- Casino Blackjack (2007) Windows
- Casino Poker (2007) Windows
- Caterpillar Construction Tycoon (2006) Windows
- Centipede / Breakout / Warlords] (2005) Game Boy Advance
- Chess Crusade (2008) PlayStation 2, Wii, Windows
- Chicken Shoot (2007) Nintendo DS, Wii
- Chicken Shoot 1 (2005) Game Boy Advance
- Chicken Shoot 2 (2005) Game Boy Advance
- Chicken Blaster (2010) Nintendo DS, Wii
- ChoroQ (2005) PlayStation 2
- Combat: Task Force 121 (2006) Xbox
- Command and Destroy (2008) Nintendo DS
- Dead to Rights (2004) Game Boy Advance
- Deal or No Deal: Special Edition (2010) Nintendo DS, Wii
- Defender of the Crown (2004) Game Boy Advance
- Defender of the Crown: Heroes Live Forever (2007) Windows
- Defendin' de Penguin (2010) Nintendo DS, Wii
- Double Sequence: The Q-Virus Invasion (2008) Nintendo DS
- Dr. Seuss: How the Grinch Stole Christmas (2007) Nintendo DS
- Ed's Farm (2008) Nintendo DS
- Ed, Edd n Eddy: Jawbreakers! (2002) Game Boy Advance
- Exodus from the Earth (2010) Windows
- Family Gameshow (2009) Wii
- Food Coach: Healthy Living Made Easy (2010) Nintendo DS
- Ford Racing 3 (2005) Game Boy Advance, Nintendo DS
- Freedom Wings (2007) Nintendo DS
- Freekstyle (2003) Game Boy Advance
- Gadget Racers (2003) Game Boy Advance, PlayStation 2
- Geki-Oh Shooting King: Shienryu (2004) PlayStation
- Gadget Racers (2003) GameCube
- Gallop Racer 2 (2005) PlayStation 2
- Garfield's Fun Fest (2008) Nintendo DS
- Garfield Gets Real (2009) Nintendo DS
- Gauntlet & Rampart (2005) Game Boy Advance
- Gekido Advance: Kintaro's Revenge (2002) Game Boy Advance
- Guilty Gear Isuka (2006) Windows
- Guilty Gear X2#Reload (2004) PlayStation 2, Windows, Xbox
- Guinness World Records 50th Anniversary (2004) DVD player
- Gun Metal (2003) Windows
- Harlem Globetrotters: World Tour (2006) Game Boy Advance, Nintendo DS
- Hot Wheels: All Out (2006) Game Boy Advance
- Hot Wheels: Stunt Track Challenge / World Race (2006) Game Boy Advance
- Hot Wheels Ultimate Racing (2007) PlayStation Portable
- Indianapolis 500 Evolution (2010) Windows, Xbox 360
- Interactive Championship Challenge (2003) DVD player
- I-Ninja (2004) Windows
- Jeep Thrills (2008) PlayStation 2, Wii
- Juka and the Monophonic Menace (2006) Game Boy Advance
- Jig-a-Pix Love is ... (2010) Nintendo DS
- Jig-a-Pix Pets (2009) Nintendo DS
- Jig-a-Pix Wild World (2009) Nintendo DS
- Jig-a-Pix Wonderful World (2009) Nintendo DS
- Kazoo Home Creative Studio (2002) Windows
- Kill Switch (2004) Game Boy Advance
- Killer 3D Pool (2005) Game Boy Advance
- L.A. Rush (2006) Windows
- Lionel Trains: On Track (2007) Nintendo DS
- Love Is...In Bloom (2009) Nintendo DS, Wii
- M&M's Break' Em (2007) Game Boy Advance, Nintendo DS
- M&M's Kart Racing (2008) Nintendo DS, Wii
- Manchester United Interactive (2004) DVD player
- Marble Madness / Klax (2005) Game Boy Advance
- March of the Penguins (2007) Game Boy Advance, Nintendo DS
- Margots Bepuzzled! (2009) Nintendo DS, Wii
- Matchbox Missions: Air, Land & Sea Rescue / Emergency Response (2006) Game Boy Advance
- Mark Davis Pro Bass Challenge (2003) PlayStation 2
- Medal of Honor: Underground (2003) Game Boy Advance
- Midway Arcade Treasures (2004) Windows
- Midway Arcade Treasures Deluxe Edition (2006) Windows
- Millipede & Super Breakout & Lunar Lander (2005) Game Boy Advance
- Monopoly (2004) Game Boy Advance
- Monster Pals (2010) Nintendo DS, Wii
- Monster Trucks Mayhem (2006) Game Boy Advance
- Ms. Pac-Man Maze Madness (2004) Game Boy Advance
- Ms. Pac-Man Maze Madness / Pac-Man World (2005) Game Boy Advance
- Need for Speed: Porsche Unleashed (2004) Game Boy Advance
- North American Hunting Extravaganza (2009) Wii
- Oktoberfest (2009) Nintendo DS
- Original Frisbee Disc Sports: Ultimate & Golf (2007) Nintendo DS
- Pac-Man Pinball Advance (2005) Game Boy Advance
- Pac-Man World (2004) Game Boy Advance
- Pac-Man World 2 (2005) Game Boy Advance
- Paperboy / Rampage (2005) Game Boy Advance
- Payback (2004) Game Boy Advance
- Polly Pocket: Super Splash Island (2006) Game Boy Advance
- Pong & Asteroids & Yar's Revenge (2005) Game Boy Advance
- Pool Shark 2 (2004) PlayStation 2, Windows, Xbox
- Postal 2: Share the Pain (2003) Windows
- Powerdrome (2005) Windows
- Premier Manager 2002/2003 Season (2003) PlayStation 2, Windows
- Premier Manager 2003-04 (2003) Game Boy Advance, PlayStation 2, Windows
- Premier Manager 2004-2005 (2004) Game Boy Advance, PlayStation 2, Windows
- Premier Manager 2005-2006 (2005) Game Boy Advance, PlayStation 2, Windows
- Premier Manager 2006-2007 (2006) PlayStation 2, Windows
- Premier Manager 3 (2004) Windows
- Premier Manager 08 (2007) PlayStation 2, Windows
- Premier Manager 09 (2008) PlayStation 2, Windows
- Premier Manager '10 (2009) Windows
- Princess Natasha: Student, Secret Agent, Princess (2006) Game Boy Advance, Nintendo DS
- Psi-Ops: The Mindgate Conspiracy (2005) Windows
- Puzzle Kingdoms (2009) Nintendo DS, Wii, Windows
- R-Type III: The Third Lightning (2004) Game Boy Advance
- Racing Gears Advance (2004) Game Boy Advance
- Rapala Pro Fishing (2004) Game Boy Advance, PlayStation 2, Windows, Xbox
- Real Estate Empire (2007) Windows
- Reel Fishing: Angler's Dream (2010) Wii
- Reel Fishing: The Great Outdoors (2006) PlayStation Portable
- Road Rash: Jail Break (2003) Game Boy Advance
- Robin Hood: Defender of the Crown (2004) Windows
- Rock 'Em Sock 'Em Robots (2006) Game Boy Advance
- Ruff Trigger: The Vanocore Conspiracy (2006) PlayStation 2
- Samurai Jack: The Amulet of Time (2005) Game Boy Advance
- Scrabble Scramble (2005) Game Boy Advance
- Sea Monsters: A Prehistoric Adventure (2007) Nintendo DS, PlayStation 2, Wii
- SeaWorld Adventure Parks Tycoon 2 (2006) Windows
- Shining Stars: Super Starcade (2008) Nintendo DS
- Showtime Championship Boxing (2008) Nintendo DS, Wii
- SimCity 2000 (2003) Game Boy Advance
- Skate City Heroes (2009) Wii
- Smashing Drive (2005) Game Boy Advance
- SmileyWorld Island Challenge (2009) Nintendo DS, Wii
- Snood 2: On Vacation (2005) Game Boy Advance, Nintendo DS
- Spy Hunter & Super Sprint (2005) Game Boy Advance
- Steel Empire (2005) Game Boy Advance
- Stoked (2009) Xbox 360
- Story Hour: Adventures (2009) Wii
- Story Hour: Fairy Tales (2009) Wii
- Street Jam Basketball (2004) Game Boy Advance
- Street Racing Syndicate (2005) Game Boy Advance
- Sudeki (2005) Windows
- Sudokumaniacs (2006) Nintendo DS
- The Suffering (2004) Windows
- Telly Addicts (2005) DVD player
- Toy Golf (2006) Windows
- Toy Golf Extreme (2008) PlayStation 2, Windows
- Turnabout (2004) PlayStation
- Uno & Skip-Bo (2006) Game Boy Advance
- Uno 52 (2007) Game Boy Advance, Nintendo DS
- Uno Free Fall (2007) Game Boy Advance
- Uno & Skip-Bo & Uno Free Fall (2007) Nintendo DS
- Wade Hixton's Counter Punch (2004) Game Boy Advance
- Who Wants to Be a Millionaire (2002) Game Boy Advance
- Who Wants to Be a Millionaire? 2nd Edition (2004) Game Boy Advance
- Who Wants To Be A Millionaire DVD Game (2004) DVD player
- Who Wants To Be A Millionaire: Interactive: 2nd Edition (2004) DVD player
- Who Wants to Be a Millionaire? Junior (2005) Game Boy Advance
- Wiffle Ball (2007) Nintendo DS
- Wings (2004) Game Boy Advance
- Yamaha Supercross (2009) Nintendo DS, Wii, Windows

== Zoo Classics ==
These titles are reissues of ex-Gremlin Interactive titles.

- Actua Golf 3 (PlayStation)
- Actua Ice Hockey (PlayStation)
- Actua Ice Hockey 2 (Microsoft Windows)
- Actua Pool (PlayStation)
- Actua Soccer 3 (PlayStation, Microsoft Windows)
- Actua Tennis (PlayStation, Microsoft Windows)
- Buggy (PlayStation, Microsoft Windows)
- Gekido: Urban Fighters (PlayStation)
- Hardcore 4X4 (PlayStation)
- Hogs of War (PlayStation)
- Judge Dredd (PlayStation)
- Loaded (PlayStation)
- Motorhead (PlayStation)
- N2O (PlayStation)
- Premier Manager 3 (Microsoft Windows)
- Premier Manager 2000 (PlayStation)

== See also ==
- GreenScreen Interactive Software, Zushi's former parent company
