= List of Atari SA subsidiaries =

Atari SA is a Luxembourgish holding company originally founded in 1983 as Infogrames Entertainment, S.A. by businessman and politician Bruno Bonnell.

== Current ==
=== Atari VCS, LLC ===
Atari VCS, LLC is a holding company that was founded in 2017 to help develop the Atari VCS console.

=== Atari Blockchain ===
Atari Blockchain was founded in 2021 as part of a split of Atari SA's main operations. This subsidiary focuses on Cryptocurrency and Blockchain.

==== Atari Chain Ltd. ====
Atari Chain Ltd. is based in Gibraltar and was founded in March 2020 to help handle the production and distribution of the Atari Coin Cryptocurrency.

=== Atari Europe S.A.S.U. ===
Atari Europe S.A.S.U., formerly Infogrames Multimedia SA and Infogrames Europe SA, is the European distribution arm of the company, and was originally founded in 1992 to help develop and publish games for various multimedia gaming platforms including Windows and the Philips CD-I. The company later began to distribute titles from companies that had no distribution arm in Europe, such as Squaresoft and Bandai.

=== Atari Gaming ===
Atari Gaming is based in Los Angeles, United States and was founded in 2021 as part of a split of Atari SA's main operations. This subsidiary handles all the video game-related work.

==== Atari, Inc. ====
Atari, Inc. is the main publishing and distribution arm for the company in North America. It was founded as GT Interactive in 1993 by original parent company GoodTimes Entertainment. Infogrames acquired 70% of the company in December 1999, After acquiring the remaining ownership of the company in June 2000, it was renamed to Infogrames, Inc. and soon afterwards merged with Infogrames North America, before gaining its current name in May 2003.

The GT Interactive brand was sold during Atari's bankruptcy sale in July 2013 to Tommo, and later Billionsoft in 2017, until Atari purchased back the GT Interactive trademark and select titles in April 2023.

==== Atari Interactive, Inc. ====
Atari Interactive, Inc. is the owner of the Atari brand name. It was acquired by Infogrames as Hasbro Interactive, Inc. from parent company Hasbro in January 2001 and was effectively renamed Infogrames Interactive, Inc. in the process. The company owned the Atari and MicroProse brands and with this ownership, allowed all of Infogrames' subsidiaries to rebrand under the Atari brand in May 2003, with Infogrames Interactive, Inc. renamed as Atari Interactive, Inc. at the same time.

==== Infogrames, LLC ====
Infogrames, LLC is a video game publishing company, outside the "Atari" brand, founded in Los Angeles and occasionally in Paris on April 23, 2024.

=== Atari Japan KK ===
Atari Japan KK is the Japanese distribution and publication arm of Atari SA. It was originally formed in October 2000 as Infogrames Hudson KK, a joint-venture with Japanese developer and publisher Hudson Soft. After the venture ended, it was renamed as Infogrames Japan KK in 2002 before gaining its current name in 2003. It was the only Non-US Atari distribution arm that was not part of Distribution Partners or sold off to Namco Bandai Games in 2009, and remains a subsidiary of Atari SA to this day, although the company currently remains dormant. Atari publish their games in Japan through other smaller publishers.

=== MobyGames ===
MobyGames, a crowdsourced video game website, was acquired by Atari SA from Blue Flame Labs on March 8, 2022, after an initial plan to purchase the site in the previous November.

== Former ==
=== Under Atari SA ===
==== Cryptic Studios ====
On December 9, 2008, Infogrames announced they would acquire online game developer Cryptic Studios. Cryptic was known for their online titles City of Heroes and City of Villains, although the two titles were previously sold to NCSOFT in 2007 and were not included in the sale. The purchase was part of Atari's reinvention to focus on the Massively Multiplayer Online Game market. The company's then-in-development titles: Champions Online and Star Trek Online were also obtained by Atari, with the former originally being planned to be published by 2K Games who backed out of the original agreement after the purchase.

On May 17, 2011, Atari deemed their future in the MMO market as a "discontinued operation" and announced they would sell Cryptic Studios. On May 30, Perfect World Entertainment announced they would purchase Cryptic Studios from Atari for $50.3 million. The purchase was completed on August 30, with over $30 million from the sale going to pay off Atari's debts. The sale included Champions Online and Star Trek Online, but at the time didn't include the then-upcoming Neverwinter, which itself transitioned to Perfect World Entertainment after following Atari's lawsuit with Wizards of the Coast.

==== Eden Games ====
The Infogrames development team who developed V-Rally spun-off in January 1998 as Eden Studios, with Infogrames obtaining a small stake in the business. Infogrames fully purchased Eden in May 2002 for. The company continued with their development of racing games, including V-Rally 3 and Test Drive Unlimited, and branched off onto other genres with Kya: Dark Lineage, Titeuf: Mega Compet and the 2008 Alone in the Dark reboot.

The company began experiencing issues with Atari following the low sales of Test Drive Unlimited 2, when they laid off over 51 of the 80 employees working, leading to the company's remaining employees going on strike. In April 2012, Eden began negotiations as an attempt for separation from Atari due to accusations having been spread through the company and its employees., however Atari claimed in May 2012 that they were disposing of Eden, but confirmed that they would not shutter the company. On January 29, 2013, Eden Games filed for judicial liquidation., with Eurogamer reporting on April 12 that the studio had shut its doors.

In October of the same year, Eden reopened as an independent developer with no association or connection with Atari, mostly focusing on titles for mobile devices and the Nintendo Switch. The company was later purchased by Engine Gaming & Media, who sold the developer to Blockchain software company Animoca Brands in April 2022.

==== Humongous, Inc. ====
Humongous, Inc. was formed by Infogramess to hold the Humongous assets and brands without being bound to any agreement from Atari, Inc. They signed an exclusive distribution deal with them in North America up to March 2006, and was extended through March 2007. Following the expiration of this license, Humongous would re-release the Junior Adventure series in retail in 2007 and signed a publishing agreement with Majesco to publish ports of the games for the Wii. Atari Europe continued the distribution of their titles overseas. Despite the branch-off, Humongous would continue to work with Atari, Inc. under a non-exclusive contract, publishing new entries in the Backyard Sports series and handling mobile ports of the Junior Adventure series.

On January 21, 2013, Humongous, Inc. was one of the Atari SA subsidiaries to file under Chapter 11 of the United States Bankruptcy Code in the United States Bankruptcy Court for the Southern District of New York. in July 2013, Tommo purchased most of Humongous' assets including their logos and trademarks, alongside the Junior Adventure titles. The other Humongous titles that Tommo did not purchase went to other game publishers; MoonBase Commander to Rebellion Developments. Backyard Sports to Epic Gear LLC and later Day 6 Sports Group LLC, and Total Annihilation to Wargaming.

==== Infogrames Lyon House ====
Infogrames Lyon House was Infogrames' in-house development studio. They are known for developing the Looney Tunes-based title Sheep, Dog 'n' Wolf for the PlayStation and Microsoft Windows.

On October 2, 2002, Infogrames announced the studio's closure as part of their restructuring plans, which was finalized by December. During the period, various ex-Lyon House developers began their own start-up studios, including Dream On Studio.

==== Infogrames North America ====
On April 19, 1999, Infogrames announced the purchase of publisher Accolade for $50 Million, as part of their strategy to gain a distribution network in North America. The deal included their workforce of 145 employees, an internal development studio, and various vehicle licenses such as Jaguar, Land Rover and Jeep. Accolade were known for producing the Major League Baseball-endorsed Baseball series Hardball, and racing franchise Test Drive.

Following the purchase, Infogrames rebranded the division as Infogrames North America in May 1999, before E3. The newly rebranded subsidiary began to release Accolade's planned titles such as Test Drive 6 and Test Drive Off-Road 3, with the new addition of Infogrames' own titles such as games based on Looney Tunes, and Outcast.

Following the purchase of GT Interactive and rebranding as Infogrames, Inc. in June 2000, Infogrames North America was consolidated as a subsidiary of Infogrames, Inc. The merger was fully completed on October 3, 2000, and Infogrames North America was completely folded as a result. The internal development studio was shuttered by Infogrames after work on the console/PC version of Test Drive Cycles was cancelled.

During the Atari bankruptcy holdings in July 2013, game publisher Tommo purchased the "Accolade" trademark and several related assets., these later went to Hong Kong-based holding company Billionsoft in June 2017, who soon announced with Tommo that they would develop new entries for several Accolade franchises, such as Bubsy. Several titles formerly belonging to Accolade including Slave Zero were purchased by Ziggurat Interactive in March 2020.

On April 19, 2023, Atari announced that they had re-purchased the Accolade trademark and selected Accolade titles formerly held by Billionsoft and Piko Interactive.

==== Infogrames Sheffield House ====
Gremlin Interactive was purchased by Infogrames during the acquisition of their parent company Gremlin Group plc in March 1999. The company known for their Actua Sports series of Sports games, among other titles.

The purchase led to several commercially released flops, such as Hogs of War, Wacky Races Starring Dastardly and Muttley, and UEFA Challenge. In June 2002, the studio announced they would cut back on development at the studio, by reducing their number of titles to two a year, but at the cost of producing higher quality titles. Ian Stewart, Gremlin's original founder was also linked to a rumored management purchase of the studio. These cutoffs failed to deliver more profits for Infogrames and Sheffield House was closed on May 1, 2003, cutting all 50 remaining employees, although it was planned to be renamed Atari Sheffield House. Infogrames sold the ex-Gremlin assets including Actua Sports, Premier Manager and Infogrames title Hogs of War to Ian Stewart's Zoo Digital Publishing in October 2003, returning the titles back to their founder.

===== DMA Design =====
The Scottish-based developer DMA Design was acquired in the Gremlin Group plc purchase in March 1999. DMA are known for developing the Grand Theft Auto series for BMG Interactive/Take-Two Interactive. Months following the purchase, Infogrames sold DMA Design to Take-Two Interactive in September for $11 Million.

=== Under Atari, Inc. ===
==== Atari Melbourne House ====
In 1999, Infogrames purchased the video gaming assets of Australian-based Beam Software, and renamed them Infogrames Melbourne House, after Beam's publishing division. The developer was renamed to Atari Melbourne House in May 2003, following the rebranding of Infogrames' subsidiaries under the Atari brand.

Under their ownership, Atari Melbourne House focused mainly on racing titles and third-person shooters.

In November 2006, Atari Melbourne House was sold to fellow-Australian developer Krome Studios and was renamed Krome Studios Melbourne, where they became a support developer for titles produced at Krome's head offices in Brisbane until their closure in October 2010.

==== Humongous Entertainment ====
Humongous Entertainment was acquired within the purchase of GT Interactive in November 1999, who acquired Humongous themselves in 1996. Humongous were known for developing and publishing the "Junior Adventure" series of children's titles, alongside others. The company also held a subsidiary – Cavedog Entertainment, aimed for more mature titles.

After the purchase, Humongous' co-founders Ron Gilbert and Shelley Day attempted to purchase back the studio from Infogrames, Inc. using external funding, but this was pulled due to the purchase being on the same day as the dot-com collapse. By this point, Infogrames took over publishing rights to their titles, which Humongous previously handled themselves. The founders soon left Humongous, alongside many other key employees, and formed a new studio, Hulabee Entertainment, in 2001.

The studio struggled with titles after this, with Infogrames rejecting a majority of ideas and pressuring them to continue making Backyard Sports titles, which Infogrames deemed as the only profit-making brand from Humongous.

In August 2005, Atari, Inc. sold Humongous Entertainment to Infogrames Entertainment itself for shares worth US$10.3 million, effectively dissolving the developer as was. Infogrames then used the assets to form up a new subsidiary, titled Humongous, Inc.

As part of the deal, the assets were transferred to a new Infogrames subsidiary (Humongous, Inc.), while the employees of Humongous Entertainment were laid off. Infogrames is expected to sell Humongous, Inc. further. On the same day, Atari, Inc. signed an agreement with Homongous, Inc. to exclusively distribute the company's games in North America through March 2006, which was later extended through March 2007.

==== Legend Entertainment ====
Legend Entertainment was acquired by Infogrames within the GT Interactive purchase in June 2000. GT previously purchased Legend in December 1998, which are known for releasing Star Control 3, among other adventure and action titles.

On December 18, 2003, Atari announced that Legend Entertainment would close in January 2004 following the completion of Unreal II: The Awakening – Expanded Multiplayer, with Atari citicing that they had no projects in development.

==== Paradigm Entertainment ====
Paradigm Entertainment was purchased by Infogrames for $19.5 million on June 29, 2000. The company was most well known for their racing games on the Nintendo 64, including Beetle Adventure Racing and Pilotwings 64.

Under Infogrames/Atari, Paradigm branched off to multi-platform development, continuing with racing and driving games such as SpyHunter (for Midway Games), MX Rider/Big Air Freestyle, and licensed action titles based on Terminator 3, Mission: Impossible and a reimagining of the Atari arcade game Battlezone.

In May 2006, Atari announced that they would sell Paradigm Entertainment to THQ. The deal was closed in July 2006, and also included the Stuntman IP, which Paradigm had been developing a sequel to. THQ closed the studio down in November 2008, following financial difficulties and lower-than-expected sales for Stuntman: Ignition.

==== Reflections Interactive ====
Reflections Interactive was acquired within the purchase of GT Interactive in November 1999, who acquired the developer the year prior. The company developed the financially-successful Driver which would go on to spawn a franchise. Reflections also developed Stuntman, a side-project developed during the production of Driver 3.

Following low sales of Driver 3 and Atari's financial difficulties, the company sold Reflections and the Driver franchise to Ubisoft in July 2006 for US$24 million. The Stuntman franchise was not included in the purchase, as it had been already sold off to THQ in May during the sale of Paradigm Entertainment.

=== Under Atari Interactive, Inc. ===
==== Europress ====
Infogrames acquired the software division of British publishing company Europress in January 2001 as part of their Hasbro Interactive acquisition. The company was renamed as Infogrames Learning Limited in July after the Europress brand was sold back to its original owners, and was purchased by Koch Media a year later.

==== MicroProse ====
MicroProse was acquired within the Hasbro Interactive purchase in January 2001. The brand along with its development teams was known for releasing strategy titles such as Sid Meier's Civilization among other franchises such as X-COM. MicroProse was purchased by Hasbro in August 1998 following a failed attempted purchase by GT Interactive.

Through 2001 and 2002, Infogrames began a process of phasing out the MicroProse name. Much of MicroProse's Hasbro-era titles and sequels to existing MicroProse titles were released under the Infogrames or Atari brands, and the development teams at Chipping Sodbury and Hunt Valley were rebranded as Infogrames Interactive Chippenham Studio and Infogrames Interactive Hunt Valley Studio respectively. The final two games branded under the MicroProse name were Tactical Ops: Assault on Terror and Grand Prix 4, released in June and August 2002, respectively. On September 12, 2002, Infogrames announced that the Chippenham studio would close down on the 20th, leading to their then-current project of an Xbox port of Grand Prix 4 to be shelved. The only remaining ex-MicroProse development studio in Hunt Valley under Infogrames/Atari developed Monopoly Casino: Vegas Edition for Windows and later Dungeons and Dragons: Heroes for the Xbox, and although surviving under the Atari banner as "Atari Interactive Hunt Valley Studio", Atari announced the studio's closure on November 5, 2003.

In December 2007, the MicroProse trademark and brand name were sold by Atari Interactive to the Interactive Game Group, which filed for transfer of trademark protection on December 27, 2007. Interactive Game Group merged with an Airsoft gun company called the Cybergun Group in 2010, and the MicroProse trademark was later purchased by "TitanIM" co-creator David Lagettie in 2018, who revived MicroProse as a full publisher in May 2020.
