= Premier Manager 2004–2005 =

2004 video game

- PlayStation 2 cover
- Developer(s): Zoo Digital Publishing
- Publisher(s): Zoo Digital Publishing
- Series: Premier Manager
- Platform(s): Game Boy Advance, PlayStation 2, Windows
- Release: Game Boy Advance: EU: 26 November 2004; PlayStation 2: EU: 5 November 2004; Windows: EU: 5 November 2004
- Genre(s): Sports
- Mode(s): Single-player

Premier Manager 2004–2005 is a football management simulation video game, developed and published by Zoo Digital Publishing and released for the Game Boy Advance, PlayStation 2, and PC Windows in November 2004. It is the tenth game in the Premier Manager series.

== Gameplay ==
Premier Manager 2004–2005 is a football management simulation game that puts the player in charge of a team of their choice from English, French, German, Italian, Scottish, and Spanish leagues. As in the previous titles in the series developed by Zoo Digital, players are required to undertake meetings with chairmen, coaches, scouts and players, with dialogue choices impacting how club personnel perceive the manager, as well as the performance of players on the pitch. Players select their starting line-up and formations, with matches realised in a 2D isometric view.

== Development ==
Before release, Zoo Digital stated that "improvements throughout the game [compared to Premier Manager 2003–04] include a new slick and intuitive interface, improved tactics, and transfer system, and a host of new features".

== Reception ==
The title reviewed poorly. The PC version was heavily criticised by Steve Hill of PC Zone who gave it a score of just 12/100, describing the game as "more primitive than the original [Premier Manager]", with gameplay "painfully slow to the point of being unwatchable for more than a few seconds". The Daily Record's review also pointed to the slowness of the gameplay, with the game characterised as a "clunking mess which actually makes fast PC chips redundant, grinding away to yet another spreadsheet where it should be flashing through them like Wayne Rooney on speed".

P2 magazine's Kendall Lacey was equally damning of the PlayStation 2 version, pointing to its "clunky interface" and "budget-title feel", imploring readers to "stick to LMA Manager" in his 4/10 review. The Game Boy Advance version was more positively received by Cube magazine, with their review describing the game as "quite easy" but a "worthwhile attempt at recreating a football manager game away from powerhouse consoles".
