= Premier Manager 98 =

1997 video game

- PlayStation cover
- Developer: Dinamic Multimedia
- Publisher: Gremlin Interactive
- Series: Premier Manager
- Platforms: PlayStation, Microsoft Windows
- Release: PC: EU: 8 November 1997; PlayStation: EU: July 1998
- Genre: Sports
- Modes: Single-player, multiplayer

Premier Manager 98 is a football management simulation video game released for the PC in 1997 and the PlayStation the following year. It was developed by Dinamic Multimedia and published by Gremlin Interactive. It is the fifth game in the Premier Manager series.

== Gameplay ==
Premier Manager 98 is a football management simulation game that puts the player in charge of a team of their choice from the top four English divisions (Premier League to the third division, as it was known at the time) from the 1997–98 season. Players are responsible for team selection, tactics, training, player transfers, and limited financial direction, for example setting the ticket price and allocating funds to various areas of the club's operations. The game progresses on a week-to-week basis, pausing to allow players to make decisions and to watch matches.

The game offers two different modes: Arcade in which allows players to control a club of their choosing, and Simulation mode in which players take on a vacant job in the lower leagues and can work their way up to manage a bigger club. In-game highlights use the same engine as for Gremlin's 1997 release Actua Soccer 2, with Barry Davies again providing commentary as he did in that release. The game is playable with the PlayStation Mouse accessory.

== Development ==
Madrid-based Dinamic Multimedia had already worked on several titles in the genre, having developed and published the PC Fútbol series from 1992 and developed the Premier Manager series for Gremlin Interactive since the '97 release. The developers enlisted the writers at Goal! magazine, fanzine editors and football fans to provide individual statistics for the players in the game's database. To mark the game's release Gremlin held a press launch with real-life football managers Joe Kinnear, Harry Redknapp and Dave Bassett.

== Reception ==
The game reportedly sold 44,000 copies in its first week after release, becoming the highest selling video game in the UK in July 1998 and the fourth highest selling of the year overall. It went on to become Gremlin's most successful ever UK boxed release.

Writing in CVG, Steve Key awarded the PlayStation release a score of 5/5, describing it as "deeply involving" and setting a "virtually unreachable benchmark for all those that dare to dry and better it". Extreme PlayStation magazine's Saul Trewen was similarly positive, writing that "the graphics aren't great, the sound is only functional, but the gameplay, depth and addictiveness are phenomenal". The game received a score of 7/10 in Official PlayStation Magazine, with reviewer Steve Faragher describing it as a "game that die-hard football management fans are going to find rather lightweight", pointing to its lack of challenge and "limited tactical options" including the inability to change tactics mid-game. Arcade magazine were critical of the PC version, commenting that while it had undergone an "accurate database update", the "imperfections that bugged PM's previous incarnation (Premier Manager 97) remain and now stick out further that Jimmy Hill's chin".

Edge’s Andrew McSparron was less enthusiastic, awarding it a 6, and remarking that "for all its clever scheduling and brisk load times, there's a sense déjà vu about the whole affair". He praised the expanded youth academy but argued that "off-pitch polish can't make up for mediocre matches".
