= Actua Pool =

1999 video game

- 2007 Nintendo DS cover
- Developers: Gremlin Interactive; Mirage Ltd (additional physics, UK); FrontLine Studios (DS)
- Publishers: PlayStation/Windows; Gremlin Interactive (EU); THQ (NA); Nintendo DS; Zoo Digital Publishing (EU); UFO Interactive Games (NA)
- Series: Actua Sports
- Platforms: PlayStation, Microsoft Windows, Nintendo DS
- Release: PlayStation: EU: January 1999 (PS); NA: June 17, 1999; Windows: EU: 1999; NA: June 22, 1999; Nintendo DS: AU: January 1, 2007; EU: February 2, 2007; Underground Pool: NA: January 26, 2007; EU: July 27, 2007
- Genre: Sports (pocket billiards)
- Modes: Single-player, multiplayer

Actua Pool also known as Pool Shark & Ultimate 8-Ball (depending on platform and market) is a sports simulation video game developed by British companies Gremlin Interactive and Mirage Ltd as part of their highly successful Actua Sports series of sport simulators of the mid-to-late 1990s. Actua Pool, a pool game (pocket billiards), was originally released on the Microsoft Windows platform and the Sony PlayStation home console in 1999; these versions were also published under the name Pool Shark. The game was very well received, praised for its realistic physics engine and challenging AI opponents, although the game spawned a sequel which was not as successful. In 2007, Actua Pool was ported to the Nintendo DS handheld game console.

== Description ==
Actua Pool is a pool simulation game with dozens of game modes, including eight-ball, nine-ball, three-ball, ten-ball, killer rules, cutthroat rules, bank rules, speed pool, one-pocket, various foreign styles and traditional snooker rules. There are dozens of venues, unique individual opponents and even different-shaped and unique tables are also available to unlock.

In one player mode, called "Hustle Mode", the character must hustle their way through smoke filled bars, casinos, pool halls and nightclubs and aim to black ball up to 18 challengers of ever-increasing skill across a range of challenging tables. There is an interactive tutorial if the player wishes, and the player can learn hundreds of trick shots from the tutorial. Each individual NPC opponent has its own unique appearance, voice, mannerisms, playing style and difficulty, and winning tournaments unlocks new NPCs to play against and venues to play in. The last opponent is the Devil himself, who is played against in Hell on his very own pool table and gamble for the player character's soul.

There are also the traditional two-player modes, as well as three-player, four-player, and so on. Any number of players can join in, and tournaments for up to 16 players are also available in which the NPC's can also be included. Player characters are completely customizable, and stats (such as accuracy and shots potted) tally up an individual player's ability.

== Venues and opponents ==
- Candy's Bar is a diner and bar in Illinois in the United States accompanied by easy listening music. The opponents there are an ex-trucker named "Slim Chance" (the poorest player in the game), and Candy Girl, a 26 year old waitress, a national pool champion and also the owner of the venue (expert level). The unique unlockable table of this venue is a hexagon corners table.
- The Croc Shack is a beach hut and bar by the sea in Australia with calypso music. The opponents there are "Wipeout", a blonde Australian surfer (professional level), and his uncle "Boom Bruce", a Crocodile Dundee-type character (master level). The unique unlockable table of this venue is a square eight table.
- The Pit is a Seattle motorcycle club/truck stop featuring rock music and a jukebox. The opponents here are Ed Case (amateur level), a stocky and bald biker with anger management issues (he will throw his cue in frustration if he loses, seemingly smashing something in the process) who plays almost every shot with high power, and his live-in girlfriend, an orange-haired female punk named Chopper (expert level). The unique unlockable table of this venue is a square sides table.
- Paradize Hole is a graffiti-painted, underground hip hop club in New York City. The opponents there are "TikTok" (professional level), a 14 year old up-and-coming hustler, and his 24 year old mentor, the suave and dapper pimp known as "Nu Jack Hustler" (master level). The unique unlockable table of this venue is a diamond sides table.
- The 1815 Club is a conservative and traditional English club frequented by members of the British army. The 1815 Club is located inside an antique country house in Aldershot in the English countryside, and features classical music. The opponents here are Lt. James Jasse (professional level), and the elderly monocled individual identified only as "The Colonel" (master level). The unique unlockable table of this venue is a hexagon sides table.
- Neon City is located in Kyoto, Japan and features bright neon lights, a transparent plastic pool table and a techno soundtrack. The opponents here are a female J-Pop singer called Idoru (amateur level), and her elder brother known as "Sayonara Kid" (expert level). The unique unlockable table of this venue is a square corners table.
- Elysian Fields is a casino in Reno, Nevada. The opponents are Alvis Burger, a blonde Elvis impersonator (professional level) who will often perform such impersonations mid game (such as "strumming" his cue like a guitar while music plays if he performs a good shot), and Al Cheeseman (master level), a tacky ex-game show host with a devoted following who follow him everywhere. Cheeseman's supporters cheer or cry depending on his performance, and since he is one of the best players in the game, they are usually clapping and laughing. The unique unlockable table of this venue is a diamond corners table.
- Z Generation is a British retro 80s club which in appearance is not entirely unlike the Neon City venue, including neon lights and a transparent pool table. The opponents here are a sultry blonde woman named Tiffany (amateur level), and a blonde suited man named Gary No One (expert level), a cocky yet skilled player who was a former pop star in the 80s. The unique unlockable table of this venue is a triangle corners table.
- Philly Joe's Pool Hall is the penultimate venue of the game in "Hustle Mode", and in which the player must go up against Philly Joe, a retired legendary professional pool player, the owner of this pool hall and the opponent with the best stats in the game. Philly Joe is also stated as being the undisputed champion of all previous international pool tournaments. This venue is actually played on Philly Joe's own table in his penthouse suite. The unique unlockable table of this venue is a dog-leg corners table.
- Judgement is a unique level actually played in Hell. (After defeating Philly Joe in Hustle mode, the opponent selection menu's background will ominously turn red and the final opponent will be automatically chosen with no input from the player). The pool table is suspended in the air above a pit of fire, with screams echoing from below, and the player challenges the Devil himself who appears as a floating, bald man with a goatee in a red suit. The Devil's stats are simply listed as ??? due to his supernatural abilities on the table. He cackles manically, and his head spins on his shoulders. It is not uncommon to be "7 balled" on this last level. However if the player wins in hustle mode, the Devil will look shocked and fall into the pit of fire below. The unique unlockable table of this venue is a pentagon sides tabe.

== Reception ==
Actua Pool (1999)

Aggregate score
Aggregator	Score	
Aggregator	PC	PS
GameRankings	55%	73%

Review scores
Publication	Score	
Publication	PC	PS
AllGame	4/5	N/A
CNET Gamecenter	3/10	7/10
Computer Games Strategy Plus	2/5	N/A
Computer Gaming World	3/5	N/A
Game Informer	N/A	6.5/10
GamePro	N/A	4/5
GameSpot	6.9/10	6.6/10
IGN	7.4/10	8/10
Next Generation	4/5	N/A
Official U.S. PlayStation Magazine	N/A	4/5
PC Accelerator	7/10	N/A
PC Gamer (US)	24%	N/A

The PC and PlayStation versions received mixed or average reviews according to the review aggregation website GameRankings. The graphics of the game were generally considered impressive at the time of release, and the game physics engine was praised as very realistic, and the AI fairly advanced for a pool game.

Next Generation said that the PC version can be played on a LAN or via the Internet, also saying that game has a minor issues with LAN lag and modem speed.

== Legacy ==
In 2003 Actua Pool was re-released for Windows and PlayStation by Zoo Digital Publishing under their "Zoo Classics" label.

In 2007, U Wish Games released another updated version for PCs.

In 2007, the game was re-developed with enhanced graphics by Frontline Studios, published by Zoo Digital Publishing and UFO Interactive Games and ported to Nintendo DS. This version is known as Underground Pool in North America, and also known as Power Play Pool in Europe.

=== Reception ===
Actua Pool (2007)

Aggregate score
Aggregator	Score
Metacritic	40/100

Review scores
Publication	Score
4Players	68%
GameSpot	3.1/10
GameZone	4.9/10
IGN	3.5/10
NGamer	47%
PALGN	4.5/10

The DS version enjoyed good sales, but was not as well received critically as the original game, as the former received "unfavorable" reviews according to the review aggregation website Metacritic.

== Sequel ==
A sequel was released in 2004 for Microsoft Windows, PlayStation 2, and Xbox entitled Pool Shark 2. It was developed by Blade Interactive and published by Zoo Digital Publishing. The "Actua" title was not included as the Actua Sports series had become defunct some years previously, as had the original developers Gremlin Interactive, and therefore Pool Shark 2 is not actually part of the same series of the original. Although Pool Shark 2 had better graphics than Actua Pool due to the advances in game technology, the sequel was not as critically well received as the original, and did not enjoy good sales like its predecessor.
