= Jeep Jamboree =

- Jeep Jamboree: Off Road Adventure, a Game Boy racing video game
- Jeep Jamboree USA, cross-country tour of the "best" off-roading trails
