= Snoopy's Silly Sports Spectacular =

1988 video game

- North American cover art
- Developer: Kemco
- Publisher: Kemco
- Composer: Hiroyuki Masuno
- Platform: NES
- Release: JP: September 22, 1988; NA: April 1990
- Genre: Sports
- Modes: Single-player, multiplayer

Snoopy's Silly Sports Spectacular!, known in Japan as Donald Duck (ドナルドダック) and based on the British home computer game Alternative World Games, is a child-oriented sports game that was released by Kemco for the Nintendo Entertainment System on September 22, 1988 (April 1990 in North America).

== Summary ==
Snoopy and his brother Spike facing off against each in the sack race event.

This video game is a collection of six events that uses various characters from the Peanuts series (Donald Duck in the Japanese version) as opponents. Events include boot throwing (similar to hammer throwing), pizza balancing, and sack racing.

In the background, landmarks unique to Italy are shown (i.e., Leaning Tower of Pisa) and the structures using Roman architecture (i.e., the Colosseum) are shown while the player competes at the six events. Playing the "River Jump" event requires impeccable timing; like in the long jump event in the Track & Field video game Dewey (in the Donald Duck version), always pushes the lagging player ahead of the leader, allowing them to catch up. A majority of the game seems to be ported from the Commodore 64 video game Alternative World Games by Gremlin Interactive.

The graphics in the game tend to flicker while the color palette can be unusual for certain events in the game. For example, the Japanese version had Donald Duck developing green skin or his trademark blue hat suddenly becoming black.

== Development ==
Snoopy's Silly Sports Spectacular is a loose port of Alternative World Games, a 1987 title for the Commodore 64, Amstrad CPC and ZX Spectrum. Kemco had signed a deal with British developer and publisher Gremlin Graphics for the console rights to several of their computer games (such as Monty on the Run), but this was the only title of theirs to be re-released back to the West.

Two music tracks in the game were previously used in the Japanese Famicom version of Spy vs. Spy II: The Island Caper, the most notable being the menu theme.

=== Licensing ===
After the release of the Family Computer Disk System title Roger Rabbit, Kemco still had the rights to release Disney-based video games in Japan, while the Who Framed Roger Rabbit license expired, making them choose Donald Duck and release a video game starring him in Japan. As Japanese video game company Capcom USA held the Disney license in North America, Kemco decided to license Snoopy instead for the North American version.
