= ATV: Thunder Ridge Riders =

Racing video game

- Developers: Skyworks Technologies; Apex Design (DS); Skyworks Interactive (DS)
- Publishers: NA: DSI Games; EU: Zoo Digital Publishing
- Platforms: Game Boy Advance; Nintendo DS
- Release: September 1, 2006: Game Boy Advance; EU: September 1, 2006; NA: September 5, 2006 Nintendo DS; NA: August 15, 2007; EU: October 19, 2007; AU: October 25, 2007
- Genre: Racing
- Mode: Single-player

ATV: Thunder Ridge Riders is a racing video game developed for the Game Boy Advance in 2006 and for the Nintendo DS in 2007.

== Gameplay ==
In ATV: Thunder Ridge Riders, players maneuver all-terrain vehicles through a desert wasteland environment while competing against three computer-controlled opponents. The game features three distinct styles of play: "Quick Game", "Career", and "Timed Checkpoint". Throughout the game, players can earn performance upgrades for their vehicles to improve their engines, shocks, and tires.

== Development and release ==
The Game Boy Advance version was developed by Skyworks Technologies, published by DSI Games for North-America and by Zoo Digital Publishing for Europe. The game was developed with the voxel engine. Prior to its release, a schedule in the German magazine N-Zone mistakenly listed Capcom as the game's publisher.

In 2007, a port was prepared for the Nintendo DS, co-developed by Apex Design and Skyworks Interactive. This version was not sold as a standalone release, but was exclusively packaged as a double-pack compilation bundle with Monster Truck Mayhem.

On December 6, 2007, Nintendo issued an official press release announcing the line-up of titles scheduled for the Wii console throughout 2008, which included ATV Thunder Ridge Riders & Monster Trucks for March 7, 2008, to be published by Zoo Digital Publishing. This release schedule was also reflected in the industry press at the time, appearing in the upcoming release lists of magazines such as Hobby Consolas. However, the game was never released for the Wii, and the project was subsequently cancelled without further official notification.

== Reception ==
Reception

Review scores
Publication	Score	
Publication	DS	GBA
IGN	2/10	
Mobile Gamer		6/10
GameZone	4/10	
Jeuxvideo.com	1/20	
Nintendo Gamer		52%

The Game Boy Advance version of ATV: Thunder Ridge Riders it was featured in the Brazilian magazine Nintendo World, which found the multiplayer mode fun, but noted that the gameplay felt not very sensitive. The magazine Retro Gamer included the title, among the 3D games that challenged Nintendo's vision for hardware, thanks to the voxel engine implemented by the developers in the game. The version was also reviewed in a 3D racing game roundup by the German magazine Mobile Gamer, which awarded it a score of 6 out of 10 for its graphics engine, but criticized its gameplay for being clunky. Nintendo Gamer noted that the game "works" but in a predictable way due to its opponent AI and identical-looking tracks.

The Nintendo DS double-pack version was heavily panned by critics. Steven Woodward of GameZone awarded the bundle a 4/10, citing poor overall quality. Jack Devries of IGN rated the compilation a 2/10, describing the package as a poorly executed release.
