= Barry Davies =

English sports commentator

Barry Davies MBE
- Born: 24 October 1937 (age 88); London, England
- Occupations: Sports commentator and television presenter

Barry George Davies (born 24 October 1937) is an English retired sports commentator and television presenter. He covered a wide range of sports in a long career, primarily for the BBC.

Although best known for his football commentary, Davies has commentated on numerous other sports, including tennis, badminton, ice skating, gymnastics, hockey, ice hockey, cycling, beach volleyball and athletics. He was prominent in the BBC's Olympics coverage, where he twice (Sydney 2000, Athens 2004) commentated on the opening and closing ceremonies of the Summer Games. He also covered both ceremonies for the Olympic Broadcasting Service coverage of the London 2012 games.

Davies was also the voice of the boat race between 1993 and 2004 and the presenter of Maestro in the 1980s (a series of interviews with retired sporting legends). His was the voice that welcomed tourists to London Heathrow in 2012 as they arrived for the Olympic Games. Davies has covered more Summer Olympics (12) than any other British sports broadcaster.

== Early life ==
Davies was born in London and was educated at Cranbrook School in Cranbrook, Kent – which also numbers commentators Brian Moore and Peter West among its alumni – and King's College London, where he read Dentistry, although contrary to what has often been reported he never qualified or practised as a dentist. He says in his autobiography that his original aim was to become a doctor, but although he did well in his school exams, he didn't quite get the grades required to win a university place to read medicine. Dentistry was therefore a second choice that he "soon came to regret" and eventually he "flunked out" due to spending too much time playing and watching sport.

== Career ==
Davies started his broadcasting career with British Forces Broadcasting while doing his National Service in the British Army of the Rhine as a second-lieutenant in West Germany. Davies' boss at BFBS was Gerald Sinstadt, who, upon their return to Britain, helped Davies get into BBC Radio in 1963, working concurrently as a sports journalist for The Times. Perhaps his most iconic and famous commentary was during the Manchester City versus Derby County league encounter in 1974 when Derby's Francis Lee turned on the edge of the box and unleashed an unstoppable screamer into Manchester City's net. "Interesting – Very interesting – Look at his face, just look at his face!"

=== ITV ===
Ahead of the 1966 FIFA World Cup he took his first steps into television with ITV. He made his debut on a Fairs Cup tie between Chelsea and A.C. Milan, played on 16 February 1966, before covering England's pre-World Cup friendly with West Germany. During the World Cup in England, Davies covered all the matches in the North East, including North Korea's famous 1–0 win over Italy, although none of them were broadcast live, because in those days all the matches on the same day kicked off at the same time and in the days before multi-channel television only one game, invariably the one involving England would be shown live. Davies would not make his "live" network football debut until the 1970 World Cup, when he commentated on Italy vs Uruguay for the BBC, although in May 1969 he had commentated on the Wales vs Scotland game in the Home International Championship when still with ITV, but this game was only shown live in the LWT and HTV Wales regions.

His spell with ITV continued for another three years, providing commentaries for ABC and Granada Television. Davies also covered the 1968 Olympic Games in Mexico City, commentating on a number of sports. When LWT launched in 1968, he was the choice of the Deputy Head of Sport John Bromley to commentate on and present their new football show The Big Match. Bromley's boss Jimmy Hill won the argument though and installed his choice, Brian Moore, in the role that he would fill for the next thirty years (Moore had commentated on the 1966 World Cup Final for BBC radio), although Davies and Moore both claimed to have been unaware of this until many years later.

=== BBC ===
Davies joined the BBC in July 1969, making his first brief on-screen appearance as a touchline reporter at the Wales v Rest of the UK International football match held to celebrate the Investiture of the Prince of Wales, but for the next 35 years he was closely associated with the Match of the Day programme, making his debut in unusual circumstances on 9 August 1969. The programme was to take up a new format, providing each region with its own second match. Davies was signed primarily to cover matches in the North of England and was assigned League Champions Leeds United's match with Tottenham Hotspur on day one. However, on the day before the broadcast, main commentator and presenter David Coleman lost his voice, succumbing to the same flu illness that had already ruled Kenneth Wolstenholme out of covering that weekend's matches. Davies, who had stayed in the Queen's Hotel in Leeds on the Friday night, describes in his autobiography how he "barely had time to eat his cornflakes" on the Saturday morning before being put in a fast car and driven to London so he could commentate on the main match, Crystal Palace v Manchester United, and co-present the show with Frank Bough.

As a BBC football commentator Davies covered nine World Cups (he also covered one with ITV, in 1966, making a total of ten covered) – including the 1994 final – and seven European Championships. He provided commentary for the final of the 1972 tournament in Belgium between West Germany and the USSR, but covered only two FA Cup Finals in his career – the 1995 final between Everton and Manchester United and the 1996 final between Manchester United and Liverpool as John Motson regularly landed FA Cup finals after 1977.

The rivalry between Motson and Davies started when the then senior commentator David Coleman was in a contractual dispute with the BBC and was therefore unavailable to cover the 1977 FA Cup Final, the most prestigious domestic game of the season. The more experienced Davies was expected to cover the match and Davies states in his autobiography that he had been told by the then football editor Sam Leitch that the game was his, and it came as a total shock to Davies when the BBC announced that Motson would be covering the match, especially as Motson had never done a "live" game for television before. Although Motson and Davies were often portrayed as firm rivals for the main commentary spot at the BBC, the pair have spoken of their respect for each other, with Davies insisting there has "never been any animosity" between them, and Motson warmly praising Davies in his own autobiography for his ability to cover a multitude of sports at the highest level.

Davies was to enjoy most of his leading games in European Cup finals, which were covered by the BBC in alternate years (by agreement with ITV) during the era of English dominance in the late 1970s and early 1980s. He commentated on twelve European Cup finals in all – including triumphs for Liverpool and Nottingham Forest – and the horrors of the Heysel in 1985. He also covered a number of finals of the European Cup Winners Cup and UEFA Cup as well as the Football League Cup final on the rare occasions it was shown on the BBC, and tended to commentate on the draws for the World Cup and European Championship .

Despite missing out on commentating on any international tournament final apart from that of 1972 and 1994, Davies would normally be chosen for at least one England match if they qualified. England matches he commentated on include the quarter-finals against Argentina in World Cup 1986 and Cameroon in World Cup 1990 and the semi-final of Euro '96 against Germany. He was also often the BBC's choice of commentator for broadcast to English viewers if Scotland were involved in a World Cup match, such as the opening game of France '98 against Brazil.

After 35 years of working with Match of the Day, Davies' final appearance on the programme came on 25 September 2004, commentating on a match between Manchester City and Arsenal. After the match, Arsène Wenger paid tribute to Davies and Kevin Keegan presented Davies with a signed Manchester City shirt. Davies' reason for retiring from football commentary was that he felt he was not getting enough "big" matches, and was being "downgraded", noting in his autobiography that he had not been invited to cover any of England's games at the 2004 European Championship. Indeed, the two-year extension he was being offered on his contract made clear that he would not be covering any "live" football, and there was no guarantee that he would have any involvement at all with the 2006 World Cup. He felt this unacceptable and declined the offer.

Before his final commentary game for Match of the Day, Davies said:

It is not a fit of pique why I am leaving, but I wanted more than just doing a few minutes' commentating on the roster. There is too much talk from commentators nowadays. Dramatic moments in football speak for themselves.

The BBC's head of football Niall Sloane said:

Barry Davies is one of the great football commentators. His ability to sum up memorable moments succinctly has been one of the prime distinctions of the programme down the years.

=== Freelance: 2004–2019 ===
Davies continued to work for the BBC on a freelance basis, covering the 2006 Winter Olympics and Commonwealth Games and in the summers of 2007 and 2008 could be heard commentating on the French Open (when in both years he covered the Men's Singles Final), the Wimbledon Championships before covering the hockey and beach volleyball at the 2008 Olympic Games in Beijing. That same year, he also reprised his role as the voice of the Boat Race by leading the commentary team on the London radio station LBC, renewing it in 2009 – the last year that LBC had the radio rights to the contest.

On 23 August 2007, Headline press published his memoirs of 40 years in sports broadcasting, entitled Interesting, Very Interesting, after a commentary line from a match between Derby County and Manchester City in 1974. When promoting the book on Talksport programme Hawksbee & Jacobs, Davies revealed that he was a fan of Tottenham Hotspur. Davies said he did not want to be accused of bias, so did not want to reveal who he supported during his career, or even where he was born. He revealed on a radio interview with Simon Mayo in 2007 (after he had retired from football commentary) that he also supports non-league side Windsor & Eton, and currently serves as their President.

After he was dropped from the 2009 French Open tennis and the World and European Ice Skating Championships, and the following year was not involved at all with the 2010 Winter Olympics (after working on every Olympic tournament since 1968), and did not cover that year's Boat Race when the contract returned to the BBC, there was speculation as to whether his links with the BBC had finally been severed. However, he reappeared on the BBC in June 2010 for what was his 25th Wimbledon tennis tournament and he continued to cover every subsequent Wimbledon up to and including 2018. He did not have any involvement with the BBC's 2010 World Cup coverage, but in September 2010, the BBC announced that he would be going to that year's Commonwealth Games in India to commentate on the hockey tournament.

Davies commentated on the Wimbledon championships for the BBC in 2011, including the Ladies' Singles Final on the "3D" coverage. In an interview during the 2011 tournament, Davies said: "There are times when I miss doing football. But part of the reason I left was that the style of commentary has changed so much in a way I don't agree with. My former boss, Niall Sloane, who's now at ITV, said he thought conversational commentary was the way to go. I beg to differ. I think it's going too far."

In 2012, Davies provided the "3D" commentary on the Men's Singles Final at Wimbledon, where Roger Federer defeated Andy Murray in four sets to win his record-equalling seventh Wimbledon title. During the 2012 tournament John McEnroe spoke of his "outrage" that Davies had not commentated on football for eight years.

Davies commentated on the Hockey tournament at the 2012 London Olympics, meaning that he had commentated on 12 Summer Olympics, overtaking the record held by David Coleman for a British sports broadcaster, but he was omitted from the BBC commentary team for the 2016 games and had no involvement with any other broadcaster.

On Saturday 19 May 2012, Davies was one of the torchbearers on the opening day of the Olympic Torch Relay, carrying the torch on the outskirts of Plymouth. The invitation to participate in the relay had been issued by the International Olympic Committee in recognition of his contribution to the Olympic movement, and it was also announced that Davies would commentate on the opening and closing ceremonies of the 2012 London games for the Olympic Broadcasting Services television coverage. Davies appeared to be hinting at retirement in an interview with his local newspaper in May 2012 saying of the 2012 Olympics "...it will be a highlight of my career. It might even be a conclusion", but in June 2013 the BBC announced that Davies would again be commentating on that year's Wimbledon tennis championships for them, and the same announcement was made in respect of every tournament up to and including 2017, which was Davies' 32nd Wimbledon for the BBC.

On 30 August 2013, Davies announced that he was stepping down as the BBC's hockey commentator, having covered the sport for 41 years.

Davies returned to Match of the Day on 23 August 2014 as a one-off to celebrate the programme's 50th anniversary, and he commentated on the game between Crystal Palace and West Ham.

In September 2015, Davies filled in for Jon Champion for three weeks as the commentator on Absolute Radio's live Saturday afternoon Premier League coverage while Champion was away covering the Rugby World Cup for ITV.

In June 2018, the BBC announced that Davies was retiring at the age of 80, and 2018 would be his 33rd and final Wimbledon. To mark his career in broadcasting, the BBC screened a documentary Barry Davies: The Man, The Voice, The Legend in July 2018.

His last commentary for the BBC's domestic audience was on 15 July 2018 when he covered the Mixed Doubles Final between Jamie Murray and Victoria Azarenka, who were beaten by Alexander Peya and Nicole Melichar.

In April 2019, Davies commentated on the Boat Race for the BBC-produced "World Feed" for overseas audiences but the commentary was not heard by viewers in the UK.

== Guest appearances ==
Davies brought his talents to the comedy world in the BBC sketch show Big Train, commentating with his distinctive enthusiasm on the fictional "World Stare-Out Championships" with Phil Cornwell.

In 1995, Davies put his voice to the Actua Soccer video game developed by Gremlin Interactive. He also provided commentary in sequels to the title, including the official video game of the 1996 UEFA European Championship (UEFA Euro 96 England). Trevor Brooking joined Davies as co-commentator in the later titles. Davies also provided commentary for Actua Tennis from the same developers.

In 1999 Davies, who was the BBC's ice skating commentator at the time, provided "commentary" on the ice skating sequence on the UK version of the music video for the Robbie Williams hit single "She's the One" (the commentary was omitted on the version used for overseas markets). The single reached number 1 in the UK Singles Chart and the video won a Brit Award, although Davies said that he wasn't invited to the ceremony and (to his regret) he never got to meet Williams during the recording.

Davies provided commentary for management sims Premier Manager: Ninety Nine and Premier Manager 2000. Since 2003, Davies has voiced the various football video games produced by Codemasters: the Club Football titles released in 2003 and 2004, England International Football and the LMA Manager series since LMA 2004.

== Personal life ==
Davies makes no mention of when he was born, his early years or even his place of birth in his autobiography, although official public records give his place of birth as Islington in London. During the war he was evacuated to Gloucestershire.

Davies lives in Datchet in Berkshire, England, with his wife, Penny, a former British Airways flight attendant, to whom he has been married since 1968. They have two children Giselle Davies Pettyfer, who was formerly the Head of Communications at the International Olympic Committee and Mark Davies, who became chairman of British Rowing in 2020. In an interview in 2011, Davies said that he enjoys playing golf and spending time with his family and grandchildren.

Davies was awarded the MBE for services to sports broadcasting in the New Years Honours list published in December 2004.

In an interview in 2015, Davies revealed the other sports that he would like to have covered: "Well, I love cricket but I'm not Richie Benaud, who I think is still, by a street, the best commentator around. I enjoy watching the golfing Majors but I couldn't compete with Peter Alliss. I enjoyed doing a wide range of sports in my time and learning from people who knew more about them than me."

== Bibliography ==
- Smith, Martyn (2004). Match of the Day: 40th Anniversary. BBC Books. ISBN 0-563-52181-3.
