= Premier Manager 2000 =

2000 video game

- Developer(s): Infogrames Sheffield House
- Publisher(s): Infogrames
- Series: Premier Manager
- Platform(s): PlayStation
- Release: EU: 31 March 2000
- Genre(s): Sports
- Mode(s): Single-player, multiplayer

Premier Manager 2000 is a football management simulation video game for PlayStation. It was released only in Europe in 2000 and was developed by Infogrames Sheffield House and published by Infogrames. It is part of the Premier Manager series.

== Gameplay ==
Premier Manager 2000 is a football management simulation game that puts the player in charge of a team of their choice from the top four English divisions (Premier League to the third division, as it was known at the time) or the top two Italian, German, French, and Spanish leagues. The player must manage the team's tactics, formations, and training. The player must also manage the financial side of running a football club including choosing the team sponsors, upgrading or building new stadia, and undertaking wage negotiations with players.

The game features brief pre-rendered 3D animations, which trigger during certain in-game events such as players retiring or the construction of new stadia. Match highlights are presented in full 3D, with commentary provided by Barry Davies. Alternatively, players can choose to watch a simple text commentary describing the action. The game supports use of the PlayStation Mouse and up to four players using the Multitap accessory.

== Development ==
Following the acquisition of Gremlin Interactive by Infogrames in 1999, development of the series shifted in-house to Infogrames Sheffield House from Madrid-based company Dinamic Multimedia, which had developed the Premier Manager series since its '97 release. The 3D highlights provided in-game utilise Gremlin's Actua Soccer 3 engine.

== Reception ==
The title received mixed reviews, with critics praising its simple user interface and pick up and play gameplay but with others arguing that the gameplay was little changed from the previous game in the series (Premier Manager: Ninety Nine) and pointing to the relative strength of competitors on the console such as LMA Manager. CVG's Maura Sutton wrote that the game "rapidly dissolves into a tedious mixture of text and repetitive churning through various screens" and criticised the "clunky and awkward" control system, awarding a score of just 2/5. Total Station's Lee Barrass praised the game's "friendly interface and a wealth of statistics that would keep even the hardest of anoraks happy" but argued that "for sheer gameplay...you may have to look elsewhere in an overcrowded market" of football management games on the console. Writing in Extreme PlayStation magazine, Kendall Lacey gave a score of 85%, describing it as an "interesting and fulfilling challenge" for players who were willing to "put in some serious hours" and wrestle with the full depth of the game's options. Official PlayStation Magazine gave the game a score of 6/10, commenting that "despite its face-lift [compared to Premier Manager: Ninety Nine] it remains old skool" and "not smart enough to tackle LMA Manager". The same magazine would later place the title at number 24 in its list of the "Best Sports Games Ever" on the PlayStation console.
