= Premier Manager 2003–04 =

2003 video game

- PlayStation 2 cover
- Developer(s): Zoo Digital Publishing
- Publisher(s): Zoo Digital Publishing
- Series: Premier Manager
- Platform(s): Game Boy Advance, PlayStation 2, Windows
- Release: EU: 28 November 2003 (GBA); EU: 5 December 2003 (PC); EU: 19 December 2003 (PS2)
- Genre(s): Sports
- Mode(s): Single-player

Premier Manager 2003–04 is a football management simulation video game, developed and published by Zoo Digital Publishing and released for the Game Boy Advance, PlayStation 2, and PC Windows in November 2003. It is the ninth game in the Premier Manager series.

== Gameplay ==
Premier Manager 2003–04 is a football management simulation game that puts the player in charge of a team of their choice from the top four English divisions (Premier League to the Second Division, as it was known at the time) or the top two Italian, German, French, and Spanish leagues. As in the previous title in the series (Premier Manager 2002/2003 Season), players are required to undertake meetings with chairmen, coaches, scouts, and players, with dialogue choices impacting how club personnel perceive the manager, as well as the performance of players on the pitch. Matches are played in a 2D engine, as opposed to the 3D engine used in the previous title.

== Development ==
The title is the first in the series developed and published by Zoo Digital Publishing, following their acquisition of the intellectual property rights of Gremlin Interactive in October 2003.

== Reception ==
Reviewing the Game Boy Advance version Official Nintendo Magazine gave a score of 64%, contending that while the game "certainly gives you a powerful thrill when your team's score changes from 0 to 1 on the Teletext-style interface", there "doesn't seem to be enough depth to stop you feeling the results are ultimately random".
