= Actua Sports =

Video game series

- Genre: Sports
- Developer: Gremlin Interactive
- Publisher: Gremlin Interactive
- Platforms: MS-DOS, PlayStation, Sega Saturn, Microsoft Windows, Nintendo DS
- First release: Actua Soccer; 1995
- Latest release: Actua Golf 3; 1999

Actua Sports is a sports video game series published by Gremlin Interactive which competed with Electronic Arts EA Sports label during the second half of the 1990s, until Gremlin was acquired by Infogrames. The term "Actua" is a (seemingly marketing-related) play on Sega's line of "Virtua" titled games, which included Virtua Fighter, Virtua Racing and Virtua Striker.

The first game in the series was the 1995 milestone title, Actua Soccer, which quickly became one of the most important titles for the company. It was later joined by the rebirth of the Premier Manager franchise and the club version of Actua Soccer. In 1996, the first non-football game was released, Actua Golf, followed by the sequels Actua Soccer 2 in 1997, now endorsed by English international Alan Shearer and Premier Manager 98. The third installment in the Actua Soccer series and the Ninety-Nine edition of Premier Manager followed in 1998, the year a new title debuted in the series: Actua Ice Hockey, the official video game of the Nagano Olympic Games ice hockey tournament, followed by Actua Tennis in the same year.

After Gremlin was acquired by Infogrames, the series went into dormancy. The now-named Infogrames Sheffield House continued to develop sports games that functioned as successors to the Actua Sports games: PGA European Tour Golf, UEFA Challenge and Slam Tennis, which were all published by Infogrames in 1999–2000, 2001, and 2002 respectively, with Premier Manager 2000 releasing in April 2000. Infogrames shuttered Sheffield House at the beginning of May 2003.

In 2002, Zoo Digital Publishing, the video game division of ZOO Digital, purchased the Premier Manager franchise from Infogrames and began to release new titles in the series. A year later in October, the now-named Atari sold a majority of Gremlin's former assets to the publisher, who in Late-2003, re-released select titles including some Actua Sports installments on the PlayStation and Windows under the "Zoo Classics" budget range.

== Titles ==
=== Actua Soccer series ===
==== Actua Soccer (1995) ====
The first title's biggest claim to fame was its full 3D graphics engine, used for the first time in a home console football game (the first full-3D football game being Sega arcade Virtua Striker); although other console games had used a 3D field, players were commonly still 2D sprites but in Actua Soccer players were polygonal. The game was developed with close ties to a local football club Sheffield Wednesday: their players provided hints to the programmers, and three players, Chris Woods, Graham Hyde and Andy Sinton, also served as motion capture models.

Actua Soccer featured only national teams, with squads of 22 players from each of 44 national sides, However a follow-up version with English Premier League teams named Actua Soccer: Club Edition was released in 1997 using 20 players from the 20 Premier League teams from 1996–97. The Actua Soccer match engine was also used to display matches in Premier Manager 64.

The first game was a bestseller in the UK, where it was backed by what journalists called "the most expensive advertising campaign ever mounted" for a console game. Tommy Glide of GamePro, while criticising the game's lack of flashy special moves and mild sound effects, deemed it the most well-rounded PlayStation soccer game to date, saying it offered a good combination of FIFA's deep strategy and Goal Storm's sharp visuals and accessibility.

==== Actua Soccer 2 (1997) ====
Actua Soccer 2 (known as Fox Sports Soccer '99 in North America), once again included national teams, but a more polished engine (optimised in the PC version for 3D graphics cards), (in some versions) the full Italian Serie A league, and a new "scenario" mode assured good sales and mostly positive reviews. It also included a team creator mode, which enabled the player to make up to 128 custom teams. Barry Davies was joined by Trevor Brooking on the commentary, and the game featured England football team captain and striker Alan Shearer not only on the cover, but also providing interviews about the game in the press. Michael Owen and Simon Tracey provided motion capture for the players. The game also featured menu music and a cameo appearance from Welsh rockers, Super Furry Animals, which could only be unlocked after entering a cheat code. Actua Soccer 2 was also bundled with Creative Technology's Voodoo 2 graphic cards, which helped to achieve widespread distribution and popularity.

==== Actua Soccer 3 (1998) ====
Actua Soccer 3 arrived in late 1998. For the first time, both club and national teams were present, plus other teams (such as Arsenal LFC) and various joke teams. While its predecessor had been criticised for the absence of club teams, Actua Soccer 3 featured a total of 25 leagues with 450 national and international teams, more than any game of the time except the earlier Sensible World of Soccer as well as over 10000 players. The graphics used a slightly improved version of the Actua Soccer 2 engine with much improved weather effects. Motion capture was provided by Sheffield United players David Holdsworth and Simon Tracey. Trevor Brooking was replaced by Martin O'Neill as Barry Davies' commentary partner. "Let Me Entertain You" by Robbie Williams was the only in-game soundtrack, while the classical operatic theme Cavalleria Rusticana (Rustic Chivalry) by Pietro Mascagni was played during the game's introduction video.

=== Actua Golf series ===
==== Actua Golf (1996) ====
Actua Golf (known as VR Golf '97 in North America) is a sports video game developed by Gremlin Interactive for the PlayStation and Sega Saturn. It was released in 1996.

==== Actua Golf 2 (1997) ====
Actua Golf 2 (known as Fox Sports Golf '99 in North America), also developed by Gremlin Interactive for the PlayStation and Microsoft Windows, was released in 1998. Actua Golf 2 received mixed reviews. Aggregating review website GameRankings gave the PC version 70.50% and the PlayStation version 38.75%.

==== Actua Golf 3 (1998) ====
Actua Golf 3 was developed by Gremlin Interactive and released on the PlayStation in October 1998. The game received an average score of 70.50% at GameRankings, based on an aggregate of 2 reviews.

==== Actua Golf 4 (cancelled) ====
In January 1999, IGN reported that a fourth Actua Golf title was in development. The title was planned on being the first to utilize the PGA European Tour license and the first to appear on the Nintendo 64. However a month later, Gremlin Interactive was bought out by Infogrames, who ditched the Actua brand. Despite that, the game remained in development but was released under the name PGA European Tour Golf for the PlayStation and Nintendo 64 in late-1999 in Europe, while North America got the Nintendo 64 version the following year as PGA European Tour.

=== Actua Ice Hockey series ===
==== Actua Ice Hockey (1998) ====
Actua Ice Hockey was developed by Gremlin Interactive for the PlayStation and Windows in 1998 and was the official video game for the Nagano Winter Olympics 1998 ice hockey tournament.

==== Actua Ice Hockey 2 (1999) ====
Actua Ice Hockey 2 was developed by Gremlin Interactive for the PlayStation and Windows in 1999. It was originally intended to be Fox Sports Hockey and was being developed by Gremlin for Fox Interactive, who had obtained an NHL license. Just over halfway through development, Fox pulled out taking the NHL license with it. Above the objections of some of the developers, development of the game continued. All references to NHL were changed to GHL (Gremlin Hockey League), all player names were modified by substituting vowels (Svoboda became Svaboda, for instance), player faces were randomized and a whole new front-end was developed.

=== Other Titles ===
==== Actua Tennis (1998) ====
Actua Tennis was released for the PlayStation in September 1998 and Windows in 1999. A Saturn version was also announced, but never released. The game featured players which were motion captured from real tennis players and commentary by Sue Barker and Barry Davies. The game received a score of 8/10 from PC Gaming World.

==== Actua Pool (1999) ====
Actua Pool was developed by Gremlin for PlayStation and Windows in 1999. The game was also released under the name Pool Shark. A sequel was developed in Europe in 2004 for the PlayStation 2 and Windows under the name Pool Shark 2 by Blade Interactive. It was not a part of the Actua series as the series had ended years prior, and Gremlin had closed. In 2007, a port of Actua Pool was released for the Nintendo DS, named Underground Pool in North America.

==== Actua Poker (cancelled) ====
On 1 February 2013, Ian Stewart's new publisher Urbanscan announced plans to create Actua Poker as a free Facebook-based browser game that would intend to start a new revived lineup of Actua Sports titles. The project was backed through Kickstarter but two weeks following the initial announcement the project was withdrawn from the site, with the Actua Sports Facebook page confirming that investors were interested in the project and had fully backed it up ready for its launch in the spring. Despite the release window, the title never saw any additional announcements and was never released.
