= Alternative World Games =

1987 video game

- European cover art
- Developer: Novotrade Software
- Publisher: Gremlin Graphics
- Platforms: Commodore 64, ZX Spectrum, Amstrad CPC
- Release: 1987: Commodore 64; PAL: 1987; NA: 1988 ZX Spectrum; PAL: July 1988 Amstrad CPC; PAL: 1988
- Genre: Sports

Alternative World Games (known as Sports-A-Roni in North America) is a video game developed by Novotrade Software and published by Gremlin Interactive in 1987. It is a parody of the Epyx Games series. There are eight different events which can be played.

== See also ==
- Snoopy's Silly Sports Spectacular
