= Premier Manager (video game) =

1992 video game

- Developers: Realms of Fantasy; Gremlin Interactive (MD)
- Publisher: Gremlin Interactive
- Designers: John Atkinson, Alex Kewin
- Series: Premier Manager
- Platforms: Amiga, Atari ST, Archimedes, MS-DOS, Mega Drive
- Release: 1992: Amiga, ST; April 1993: MS-DOS; 1994: Archimedes; November 24, 1995: Mega Drive
- Genres: Sports, simulation
- Modes: Single-player, multiplayer

Premier Manager is a football management simulation video game for the Amiga, Atari ST, Acorn Archimedes, and MS-DOS. It was released in 1992 by Gremlin Interactive. A Mega Drive conversion was published in 1995. While the Amiga, Atari, and MS-DOS versions are similar, the Mega Drive version more closely resembles Premier Manager 2. The objective of the game is to manage a football club successfully within the top five divisions of the English league system. Premier Manager is the first game in the Premier Manager series.

== Gameplay ==
Four matches occurring simultaneously

Premier Manager allows up to four users to play the game as managers of English football conference league football clubs. The user must manage the team to win football matches and maintain financial stability. There is no set target to the game but the general aim is to manage teams as successfully as possible by managing a Premier League team to the championship title and winning the trophy competitions, such as the FA Cup and the UEFA Cup.

To win matches, the manager must set formations, pick the team, buy new players, and adequately set coaching schedules to maintain player abilities. To be financially successful, the manager must not spend more than is available. The manager can also raise money by getting loans, selling players, organising sponsorship and ticket sales. The manager can increase revenue from ticket sales by improving the stadium capacity and facilities, and raising ticket prices accordingly. When using the telephone on the in game menu, if the players dialled the number 781560, all stats on their players would be raised to 99 and they would remain unbeaten. The players could re-enter this number as many times as they wished.

Premier Manager covers the top five divisions of the English football league system that were known at the time as the Premier League, Division One, Division Two, Division Three, and Conference League, and also a fictitious "Part Time" league, made up of real non-league teams. All the league data and information about players is from the 1992/1993 football season.

== Mega Drive version ==
The Sega Mega Drive version of Premier Manager was released in 1995. On the box it had the claim "the First Ever Football Management game for Mega Drive". The design of the game resembled Premier Manager 2 more than the original Premier Manager, and allowed just two players instead of four. This version of Premier Manager has the player start with a Division Three football team, the lower divisions being removed in order to save memory. The cartridge included a battery backed up 32Mb memory chip to allow the player to save games.

== Reception ==
The Amiga version of Premier Manager was well received by critics. The game received Amiga Computing's Gamer Gold award and a rating of 93%. The review highlighted how the well designed interface makes the game easy to play. Amiga Action also rated the review highly with 90% and their Amiga Action Accolade. Premier Manager received an average review from The One Amiga. The magazine said that the design of the game is nice, yet items such as the phone do not add much to the gameplay. Computer Gaming World in 1993 wrote that "it is a very 'British' game ... What this game does, it does very well."
