= UEFA Euro 96 England =

1996 video game

- Developer: Gremlin Interactive
- Publishers: Sega (Saturn); Gremlin Interactive (MS-DOS)
- Platforms: Sega Saturn, MS-DOS
- Release: May 30, 1996
- Genre: Association football
- Modes: Single-player, multiplayer

UEFA Euro 96 England is an association football video game developed by Gremlin Interactive and published by Sega for MS-DOS and the Sega Saturn in 1996. The title is an officially licensed tie in with the football tournament of the same name.

== Gameplay ==
Players can play the full European Championships or play friendly matches. The game features all sixteen national sides that qualified for Euro 1996 and all eight host stadia. In Championship mode, the participating teams are initially assigned to the same groups as in the actual tournament, although players can rearrange them, while friendly matches allow players to select their preferred teams and venues. The game also features player profiles, team statistics, six selectable camera angles and a replay system offering five playback speeds.

It features commentary from Barry Davies, with the developers stating that Davies' script includes 30,000 words (up from 22,000 words for his Actua Soccer script). The Saturn version was localised with commentary in several European languages. A retrospective by L'Éclaireur Fnac noted that the game featured commentary in numerous languages and identified French commentary by Thierry Roland. A contemporary German review in MAN!AC noted the inclusion of German-language commentary, while Hobby Consolas noted Spanish commentary by J.J Santos. Italian magazine Console Mania likewise noted the inclusion of Italian-language commentary, which it particularly praised.

The PC release offered online play for up to 20 players using BT's Wireplay network gaming system. Ultimately, it was the first PC game to utilize the Wireplay system, which eventually supported over 100 different games by the end of the decade.

== Development ==
The game was developed using the engine from Gremlin's previous football title, Actua Soccer. For that game, Gremlin had used motion capture of professional footballers Andy Sinton, Chris Woods and Graham Hyde of Sheffield Wednesday. However, the developer told Computer and Video Games that UEFA Euro 96 England featured "nearly twice as many frames of motion capture" to produce smoother animations, with Woods also assisting in improvements to the goalkeeper artificial intelligence.

In April 1996, Swedish magazine Super Play reported that the Saturn conversion was being prepared for release ahead of the European Championship and would feature the participating national teams. The magazine expressed hope that Sweden, which had failed to qualify, might nevertheless be retained from Actua Soccer's selection of teams.

The German Saturn release featured localised commentary, although a June 1996 preview in Sega Magazin reported that television presenter Jörg Wontorra, known for Sat.1's football programme ran, had not been permitted to provide the commentary because the broadcaster lacked rights to Euro 1996. An alternative German-language commentator was used instead.

In Italy, distributor Giochi Preziosi had substantially reduced its marketing expenditure on Sega products following the launch of the Saturn, with advertising increasingly focusing on individual games. In this context, UEFA Euro 96 England was singled out for a dedicated Italian television advertisement.

== Reception ==
The title received generally positive reviews. Rob Bright of Sega Saturn Magazine gave the game a score of 94%, arguing that it featured "the tidiest graphics and most dynamic animation of any footy game on the Saturn". Sega Power's Nick Merritt wrote that "the attention to detail makes this a worthy tie-in for top quality European football" and that it "blows FIFA away, no contest", awarding the game a score of 90%.

In France, Joypad awarded the Saturn version 83%, praising its comprehensive options, authentic player line-ups and French-language commentary by Thierry Roland. However, the magazine criticised its graphics, camera perspectives and difficult controls, concluding that considerable practice was necessary to master the game. Player One was less favourable, awarding it 72% and describing it as a reworked version of Actua Soccer that failed to live up to the European Championship. Its criticisms included its slow gameplay, unimpressive graphics and Roland's commentary, which did not always correspond to the on-screen action.

German magazine MAN!AC gave the Saturn version 62 out of 100, praising its presentation and multiplayer support but criticising its slow pace and similarities to Actua Soccer. Italian magazine Console Mania awarded the Saturn version 79 out of 100, particularly praising its spoken commentary, while concluding that the game added relatively little to the football genre and that more polished and playable alternatives were available. Spanish magazine Hobby Consolas was considerably more positive, awarding the game 92 out of 100 and particularly praising its graphics, gameplay and Spanish commentary.

Central European reviewers were also positive. In the Czech Republic, Sega News awarded the Saturn version 85%, praising its three-dimensional presentation and match commentary, while noting the limited selection of national teams and absence of accompanying animated sequences. Hungarian magazine 576 KByte gave the game 81%, commending its motion-captured player animations and stadium graphics, although the reviewer criticised occasional graphical imperfections and abrupt movements. Nevertheless, the magazine regarded it as one of the Saturn's best football games.

In Sweden, Super Play reviewed the Saturn version in May 1996, with reviewers Micke and Tobias awarding it 92 and 88 out of 100, respectively. Both considered it an improvement over Actua Soccer, praising the refined gameplay, smoother controls and improved passing mechanics. However, the magazine expressed disappointment that Sweden, which had failed to qualify for the tournament, was absent from the game's selection of national teams.

== Commercial performance ==
UEFA Euro 96 England was a major system seller for the Sega Saturn in the United Kingdom. On 1 July 1996, the game reached number one on the ELSPA/Chart-Track CD-console sales chart displayed on Teletext, ahead of several PlayStation titles, including Adidas Power Soccer, Actua Soccer and Alien Trilogy. To capitalise on the popularity of the official tournament, Sega held a four-day promotion in the United Kingdom from 26 to 29 June 1996, offering a free copy of UEFA Euro 96 England with every Sega Saturn purchase. The company anticipated that the promotion would significantly increase console sales. It was also one of the top-selling Sega Saturn games of 1996 at HMV's Oxford Street store in the United Kingdom.

== Legacy ==
In a 2014 retrospective on retro football games, Hobby Consolas identified UEFA Euro 96 England as the first football video game to feature Spanish-language commentary. The magazine also recalled a 1996 feature in which Real Madrid defender José García Calvo expressed surprise at hearing commentary by J.J Santos while playing the game. He preferred it over FIFA 96 and Olympic Soccer, joking that it was also the only game in which he had defeated the magazine's reviewer.

In a 2016 retrospective on European Championship video games, FourFourTwo included UEFA Euro 96 England among the notable games based on the tournament, highlighting its licensed presentation, Barry Davies commentary and use of the 3D technology developed for Actua Soccer.
