= England International Football =

2004 football video game

- Developer: Codemasters
- Publisher: Codemasters
- Platforms: PlayStation 2, Xbox
- Release: PlayStation 2, Xbox: EU: April 30, 2004
- Genre: Sports
- Modes: Single player, Multiplayer

England International Football is a football video game developed and published by Codemasters for PlayStation 2 and the Xbox in 2004. The game was officially licensed by the English Football Association, and depicts the England national football team of 2004 with the cover art featuring Steven Gerrard, Frank Lampard, David Beckham, Michael Owen and John Terry.

Development of the title was based on the Club Football engine and began in 2003. The likeness of 25 England players and manager Sven-Göran-Eriksson was "created from an exclusive photoshoot and 3D modelling session". Audio was recorded at England matches, with real fan chants recorded and used in the game.

== Gameplay ==
In addition to the England national team, 21 other European sides and 10 non-European sides are playable, with 25 man squads provided for each. Presenting and commentating are Gary Lineker and Barry Davies. A player editor feature allows players to put their own likeness into the game. As players progress through the game, they can unlock additional content in a 'Trophy Room', such as player profiles, team photographs, and video clips including highlights of England's historic 5-1 win against Germany in 2001. The title was the first football game to support multiplayer play over Xbox Live which was available to players until the termination of Xbox Live on April 15, 2010. England International Football is now playable online again on the replacement Xbox Live servers called Insignia. The game released with a free two-hour DVD entitled England's Path to Portugal, featuring highlights from England's Euro 2004 qualification campaign.

== Reception ==
The game received a largely negative critical response. CVG's Graeme Boyd awarded the game a score of 56/100, arguing that it played almost identically to Club Football "save for the tweakiest of tweaks, and suffers from the same problems", criticising the ball physics, unresponsive controls and the erratic AI of computer-controlled players. He also noted the absence of an official European Championship mode despite the England national team licence, comparing the game unfavourably to Electronic Arts' Euro 2004, which released shortly afterwards. Keith Stuart of Official PlayStation 2 Magazine was equally damning, lamenting "agonisingly ponderous and unpredictable" player responses and "ball physics that make it feel like you're booting a space hopper around", giving a score of 5/10 and dismissing the title as a "mediocre footie simulation that adds nothing to the genre and stumbles behind PES and FIFA like an arthritic goal-keeping coach". Writing in Official Xbox Magazine Andy Irving was more positive, providing a score of 8.2/10, describing it as a "competent and intuitive footy sim with fluid play and good AI", and arguing that its online compatibility was "where it shines".
