= Race Days =

1994 video game

- PAL cover art
- Developer: Gremlin Interactive
- Publisher: GameTek
- Composer: Tommy Tallarico
- Platform: Game Boy
- Release: EU: 1994; NA: November 1994
- Genre: Racing
- Modes: Single-player, multiplayer

Race Days is a 1994 racing video game for the Game Boy. It is a compilation of Dirty Racing (Japan-exclusive) and Jeep Jamboree: Off Road Adventure (North America-exclusive) with a different name for the Jeep Jamboree game.

== Summary ==
This game allows the player to compete in a race with either Grand Prix style cars (similar to Micro Machines) or with vehicles designed for off-roading.

Obstacles must be avoided and opponents must be overtaken in the Grand Prix game titled Dirty Racing while hills, bumps, and sharp curves must be navigated in the off-road event titled 4 Wheel Drive. Players in the Dirty Racing mode are informed of any sharp turns by making them look on top of their windshield. This game can be used with the GameLink cable to provide two-player fun and entertainment. Each variation has a map with plenty of statistics. Players must qualify before each race and start out with local meets before working up to the big championship. The maps are generic and do not show any nation in particular. Players can also practice before each race in order to tune up their skills.

Dirty Racing has three difficulty levels: Taking It Easy (easy), Hazardous! (medium), and Totally Dirty (hard). At the shopping cut scene, players can purchase tires along with engine boosts and nitro.

== Reception ==
GamePro's review criticized the game as having boring tracks, drab graphics, irritatingly droning engine sounds, difficult controls, and poor gameplay design, especially in "Dirty Racing". Electronic Gaming Monthly's two sports reviewers gave it scores of 73% and 75%. They remarked that the graphics and sounds are average, but praised the game as having good controls, addictive gameplay, and a good value with two games on one cartridge.
