= Premier Manager 2002/2003 Season =

2002 video game

- PlayStation 2 cover art
- Developer(s): Runecraft; Tuna Technologies
- Publisher(s): Zoo Digital Publishing
- Series: Premier Manager
- Platform(s): PlayStation 2, Windows
- Release: PS2: EU: 22 November 2002; AU: 2003; Windows: EU: 2003
- Genre(s): Sports
- Mode(s): Single-player

Premier Manager 2002/2003 Season is a football management simulation video game released for PlayStation 2 in 2002 and PC Windows the following year. The game was developed by Runecraft and published by Zoo Digital Publishing, with Tuna Technologies working on the PC port. It is the eight game in the Premier Manager series.

== Gameplay ==
Premier Manager 2002/2003 Season is a football management simulation game that puts the player in charge of a team of their choice from the top three English divisions (Premier League to the second division, as it was known at the time) or the top two Italian, German, French, and Spanish leagues. The database features over 10,000 individual players. In a first for the series, meetings with chairmen, coaches, scouts, and players are realised with 3D models and dialogue choices. Choices players make in these conversations impact how club personnel perceive the manager, as well as the performance of players on the pitch. Match highlights are rendered with 3D animations.

== Reception ==
Stuart Messham of Play awarded the title a score of 65%, describing the meetings mechanic as an "original approach" but one that ultimately resulted in "long-winded" and "rather dull" gameplay. PSW magazine's Mikey Foley gave the game a score of just 3/10, describing it as "a highly tedious trawl through screen after screen of laborious menus and pointless conversations", arguing that players may end up "wishing you'd bought LMA Manager instead". The PC version reviewed poorly in PC Zone magazine, with critic Mark Hill giving a score of just 14/100, referring to the game's "beyond awful interface and graphics" and "minimal gameplay".
