= Freedom Wings =

2006 video game

- North American cover art
- Developer: Taito
- Publishers: JP: Taito; NA: Natsume Inc.; PAL: Zoo Digital Publishing
- Platform: Nintendo DS
- Release: JP: April 27, 2006; NA: August 21, 2006; EU: February 23, 2007
- Genre: Air Combat
- Modes: Single-player, multiplayer

Freedom Wings, known in Japan as Ore no Sentouki (オレのせんとうき), is a flight simulator developed by Taito and published by Natsume Inc. in the US and Zoo Digital Publishing in Europe. The game combined elements of flight simulators and RPGs as players earned experience points for combat, earn money and maintain other statuses.

== Story ==
The game takes place on an alternate Earth in an era resembling the 1940s. Air pirates have taken to the skies and have placed fear into the hearts of others worldwide. The player assumes the role of a nameless, faceless pilot whose parents were murdered by air pirates, motivating the character to join the Air Patrol Association (APA), a squadron of mercenary pilots hired to clear the skies of air pirate activity.

== Gameplay ==
Freedom Wings features a primarily stylus based interface; players had to maintain speed, altitude, direct the plane and select all options with the stylus (although a manual maneuvering mode was optional). The rest of the plane's functions such as switching targets, firing and viewing radar screen were dependent on the DS buttons. The game forced players to limit their flying time; the longer the player stayed out flying, the more the fuel would deplete, forcing the pilot to head for the nearest friendly airfield to refuel.

From headquarters, players could save their game, take off alone or connect the game to wireless multiplayer mode. The players were urged to go to the airport café where they got new information on where larger air pirate targets were located through other characters. One major point in the game was shop where players could spend their money on new parts and equipment, (which varied depending on which airfield the player was on at the time), resulting in better combat and flight performance.

== Reception ==
Craig Harris of IGN penned a negative review, writing that the game was "unfinished" and its design does not allow for much player control. Similarly, GameSpot's Frank Provo also highlighted that some areas felt "underdeveloped or unpolished" but praised the game's unlockable planes.
