= Premier Manager 97 =

1996 video game

- Developer: Gremlin Interactive
- Publishers: Sega (MD); Gremlin Interactive (Win)
- Series: Premier Manager
- Platforms: Mega Drive, Windows
- Release: EU: October 31, 1996 (MD); EU: June 1997 (Win)
- Genre: Sports
- Modes: Single-player, multiplayer

Premier Manager 97 is a football management simulator video game developed by Gremlin Interactive and published by Sega for the Mega Drive in 1996. A PC Windows version was released in 1997. It is the fourth game in the Premier Manager series.

== Gameplay ==
The Mega Drive version puts the player in charge of a team of their choice from the English third division. The goal is to win the FA Cup. Players are responsible for club finances, player transfers, squad line-up, and ground improvements. The game supports two-player multiplayer.

== Reception ==
Reception

Review scores
Publication	Score
Computer and Video Games	5/5 (PC)
Mean Machines Sega	84/100 (MD)
PC Games (DE)	76% (PC)
PC Action	75/76% (PC)
PC Joker	80% (PC)
PC Player	3/5 (PC)

Mean Machines Sega said that the game is "excellent fun" but observed that there's not much difference compared to the previous year's version. The other reviewer from Mean Machines said that the game is hard to get into. Computer and Video Games called the PC version "the most atmospheric, entertaining and comprehensive management game". PC Joker called the game "enthralling". PC Zone compared the game to then current Premiership season and did not find it all that realistic.
