= Lionel Trains: On Track =

2006 video game

- Developer: Black Lantern Studios
- Publishers: NA: DSI Games; EU: Zoo Digital Publishing
- Platform: Nintendo DS
- Release: NA: December 6, 2006; PAL: March 16, 2007
- Genre: Business simulation
- Mode: Single player

Lionel Trains: On Track is a video game released for the Nintendo DS on December 6, 2006, licensed by Lionel Trains. The gameplay is very similar to Sid Meier's Railroad Tycoon series of computer games. In the game, the player is the head of an unspecified railroad, and their objective is to connect different cities together through rail, using the funds they start off with, and later earn. There are several separate modes of gameplay, with varying objectives.

Lionel Trains received "generally unfavorable reviews", according to Metacritic.

== See also ==
- 3D Ultra Lionel Traintown: Windows game licensed by Lionel LLC
