= Jeep Jamboree: Off Road Adventure =

1992 video game

- Box art of Jeep Jamboree: Off Road Adventure
- Developer: Gremlin Interactive
- Publisher: Virgin Games
- Designer: Ali Davidson
- Composer: Tommy Tallarico
- Platform: Game Boy
- Release: NA: July 1992
- Genre: Off-road racing
- Modes: Single-player, multiplayer

Jeep Jamboree: Off Road Adventure is a Game Boy racing video game that involves Jeep Wrangler vehicles. This game was later recycled for use in the video game Race Days (also for the Game Boy).

== Gameplay ==
Driving at a speed of 130 km/H on the open road against other drivers.

A first person perspective is used like in the game Test Drive and its sequels.

There are several options in the game including: difficulty level, whether to race in MPH or KM/H, steering ability, whether or not to have a track map, chevrons, and position flashing. The object is to race laps around a muddy race track while trying to get first place. There are twenty tracks to race in, each with a timer that forces the player to race fast. There is an option to either do a single race or a multi-race tournament against a computer opponent or through a human playing while using the Game Boy link cable and another copy of the video game. Items in the background like electric lines and rocks help provide a road-like feeling to the races.

In a single-player race, the player will race to the finish line against a field of approximately nineteen other drivers.

== Reception ==
Allgame gave this video game a rating of 3 stars out of 5 in their review.
