= Street Jam Basketball =

2004 video game

- Developer: Prograph Research
- Publisher: DSI Games
- Platform: Game Boy Advance
- Release: 25 April 2004
- Genre: Sports video game
- Modes: Single player, Multiplayer

Street Jam Basketball is a 2004 basketball sports video game for the Game Boy Advance developed by Prograph Research and published by DSI Games. The game is the first Advance title to be developed by Italian studio Prograph Research. Upon release, Street Jam Basketball received generally unfavorable reviews, with criticism directed to the game's limited variety and gameplay options, and the confusing presentation of its sprites.

== Gameplay ==
A screenshot of Street Jam Basketball.

The game is a simulation of three-on-three basketball, with players selecting three of 40 characters to play on the court. Players use the B button to pass and steal the ball from opponents, the A button to block and shoot, and the shoulder buttons to switch teammates. The game features three modes: Exhibition, Story, and Versus Play. In the Story mode, players progress a series of 15 tournaments held on different courts set across street settings, with 8 unlocked as the player progresses for later play in Exhibition mode. Street Jam Basketball supports multiplayer play in the Versus Play mode using the Game Link Cable for up to two players.

== Reception ==
Reception

Aggregate score
Aggregator	Score
Metacritic	35%

Review scores
Publication	Score
AllGame	1.5/5
GameSpot	3.4/10
IGN	3.5/10
Nintendo Power	2/5
Official Nintendo Magazine	28%

Street Jam Basketball received "generally unfavorable" reviews, according to review aggregator Metacritic. Several critics commented on the limited moveset and lack of different options to pass or shoot the ball. Describing the game as an "unbelievable failure" and "one of the worst games on the handheld", Craig Harris of IGN critiqued its "extremely stiff" animations and limited variety in gameplay options. Frank Provo of GameSpot stated that the game had "little to see and do" due to the lack of "depth or variety" to game modes and gameplay options, although the "courts look great and show a few nice details". Considering the game to lack any redeeming features, Official Nintendo Magazine similarly stated the game's sprites were "jerky and clunky", making it difficult to identify the player character. Nintendo Power found the game "fast-paced" and scoring "easy to pull off", but considered it "difficult" to defend from opponents.
