= Premier Manager: Ninety Nine =

1999 video game

- Cover art of Premier Manager 64
- Developer(s): Dinamic Multimedia
- Publisher(s): Gremlin Interactive
- Series: Premier Manager
- Platform(s): PlayStation, Microsoft Windows, Nintendo 64
- Release: EU: August 1999
- Genre(s): Sports
- Mode(s): Single-player

Premier Manager: Ninety Nine is a football management simulation video game for PC, PlayStation, Microsoft Windows, and Nintendo 64 (with the latter version known as Premier Manager 64). It was released in Europe in 1999, and was developed by Dinamic Multimedia and published by Gremlin Interactive. It is part of the Premier Manager series and was endorsed by then England national football team manager Kevin Keegan.

== Overview ==
Premier Manager: Ninety Nine is a football management simulation game that puts the player in charge of a team of their choice from the top four English divisions (Premier League to the third division, as it was known at the time) or the top two Italian leagues (Serie A and Serie B) on the PlayStation version but limited to just the English leagues in the PC and Nintendo 64 releases.

The player must manage the team's tactics, formations and training. The player must also manage the financial side of running a football club so to be able to afford from purchasing some of the new players for a team. Premier Manager uses the Actua Soccer engine to display football matches. At the time, this was a new feature and set Premier Manager apart from other football management games. Using the engine allows the player of the game to view the match in detail and assess when and where tactical changes need to be made. The game featured commentary from Barry Davies.

== Development ==
Madrid-based Dinamic Multimedia had already worked on several titles in the genre, having developed and published the PC Fútbol series from 1992 and developed the Premier Manager series for Gremlin Interactive since the '97 release.

== Reception ==
Steve Key of CVG gave the PlayStation version a score of 5/5, praising the breadth of the gameplay compared to Championship Manager 3, describing the ability to "pick sponsors for hoardings around the pitch, TV rights, upgrade the stadium [and] fluctuate ticket prices" alongside the traditional management options as "almost player-chairman simulation". The game received a score of 90% in Official Nintendo Magazine, with the review dubbing it "the ultimate management game" and praising its breadth of options, in-game graphics and match commentary. PC Zone's Steve Hill described the game as "taking more of a Theme Park approach to football management, as opposed to the number crunching of Championship Manager", criticizing the game for the presence of bugs and an "ugly and awkward" interface but praising the 'view mode' and its 3D representation of matches.
