= Premier Manager 2 =

1993 video game

- Instruction manual art
- Developer: Realms of Fantasy
- Publisher: Gremlin Interactive
- Designers: John Atkinson; Paul Atkinson; Alex Kewin; Tony Casson
- Composer: Patrick Phelan
- Series: Premier Manager
- Platforms: Amiga, Atari ST, MS-DOS
- Release: 1993
- Genre: Sports simulation
- Modes: Single-player, multiplayer

Premier Manager 2, also known as PM2, is an association football management simulator video game developed by Realms of Fantasy for the Amiga, Atari ST, and MS-DOS. It was published in 1993 by Gremlin Interactive. The objective of the game is to manage a football club successfully within the top five divisions in the English football league system. It was preceded by Premier Manager and followed by Premier Manager 3.

== Gameplay ==
Premier Manager 2 follows on from Premier Manager and uses the same situation for the game. The user gets to choose one of the Conference League teams to join as manager. They then must manage the team's players and tactics to win matches. The team can play in both the league and cup competitions.

Two matches taking place

In the Conference League the teams automatically qualify for the FA Cup first round, unlike in reality where non-league teams must go through qualifying rounds. As well as managing the team, the user must also manage the club's finances, such as bank loans and advertising boards. Money can be raised by selling players, adding sponsors, and ticket sales, as well as some miscellaneous events. To improve ticket sales, the user can invest in upgrading various aspects of the stadium such as seating and facilities.

The game is for one or two players who can choose their team at the beginning of the game. The two users must then take turns in accessing the computer game to manage their teams. During player transfers, both users are requested to make a bid. They can change the team they manage by applying for positions when they become available during the season, or accept job offers at the end of the season once their contract expires.

== Reception ==
Premier Manager 2 was seen as an improvement from the original Premier Manager game. Amiga User International observed that various interface changes made the game much more enjoyable to play. The magazine rated Premier Manager 2 at 91%. It was also the magazines's "Game of the Month". The One Amiga also rated the game highly at 90% but drew attention to the lack of the sound in the game. Amiga Format said the game was let down by the minimal sound effects but rated the game highly at 89%, and said it is a very realistic football management simulation.

Amiga Power rated the game 79% and suggested that it seems to be more of an update for Premier Manager. The review praised the easy to use interface. Computer Gaming World said in June 1994 that Premier Manager 2's new features made it "the best in its class", and that while other games had better graphics, it was "the tops as far as gameplay is concerned". The magazine concluded that it was "a classic football game".
