= Cutthroat (pool) =

Pocket billiards game

Cutthroat or cut-throat, also sometimes referred to as three-man-screw, is a typically three-player or team pocket billiards game, played on a pool table, with a full standard set of pool balls (15 numbered object balls and a cue ball); the game cannot be played with three or more players with an unnumbered reds-and-yellows ball set, as used in blackball. Each player is commonly assigned a set of five consecutively numbered object balls, though the number of balls will vary by number of players. The object of the game is to be the last player with at least one ball of their group remaining on the table.

The name "cutthroat" is not unique to pool, but is used to refer to other games played with three or more players in which all players must fend for themselves, e.g. cutthroat bridge and cutthroat American handball.

== Gameplay ==
When racking the fifteen balls for cutthroat, the 1 ball is placed on the foot spot and the 6 ball and 11 ball are placed on the other two corners of the billiards rack.

In cutthroat, there are (usually) three sets of balls. Balls 1–5 are called the "low" balls, the "mid" balls are 6–10, and the "high" balls are 11–15. Each of the three players will eventually "own" one of these sets of five balls. Winning is accomplished by legally pocketing (potting) all of the other players' balls. Whether each shot must be called is determined before the game.

Each set of five balls is initially unclaimed – the ball sets remain "open" until at least one ball from two sets have been pocketed. For example, if the breaking player pockets the 6 then the 9, that player definitely does not own the 6–10 group, but does not yet clearly own either 1–5 or 11–15. If the player had pocketed the 6 then the 2, the player would definitely be group 11–15. A foul break thus includes the possibility that the fouling breaker may eventually be assigned a group from which a ball was pocketed on the foul break shot. However, if there was a foul on the break, no set can be claimed and the table is still open, no matter what balls may have been pocketed.

A player's turn continues so long as they legally pocket one or more object balls with each shot. A shooter can even knock in their own ball, allowing them to continue a turn in exchange for their now-weakened position. This circumstance is called "cutting one's own throat". If a player sinks their own last ball (intentionally or otherwise), they must sit out the rest of the game, except as noted below.

=== Fouls ===
A scratch (knocking the cue ball into a pocket or off the table) is subject to special penalties, covered below, and results in the incoming player receiving cue ball in-hand.

The general rules of pocket billiards apply, including typical fouls, such as striking the cue ball twice on the same shot, striking an object ball instead of the cue ball with the cue stick, knocking an object ball off the table, etc. Such fouls end the shooter's turn without further penalty. The incoming player does not have cue ball in-hand, but takes the table as it lies (after balls are spotted).

If a player pockets an opponent's ball while committing a foul, the opponent may raise that ball from the pocket and put it back on the table. The raised ball is placed on the foot spot.

=== Winning ===
The object is to be the last player with at least one object ball left on the table. When a player has no balls on the table, they are said to be "out" (eliminated) and their turn is skipped in the player rotation. Under normal rules (where balls are retrieved on a scratch – see below), being "out" may be a temporary condition.

=== Spotting ===
The consequence of a scratch (knocking the cue ball into a pocket or off the table) is that all of the shooter's opponents are rewarded by taking one of their own balls out of a pocket (if any have been pocketed) and spotting it back onto the table (with the next shooting player's ball placed in front of the other's ball). Thus, a player who is "out" returns to the game, with one of their balls back in play, when any then-surviving player scratches. If a scratch occurs after first pocketing an opponent's ball on the same turn, still only one ball per opponent is returned to the table, as the penalty is intended not to nullify the effects of the scratch, but to punish the offender and reward the other players evenly.

In the uncommon case that the final shot leaves only the cue ball on the table (the shooting player has pocketed both the final opponent's last ball and the shooter's own last ball), one ball of every player will be spotted in their order of shooting. The shooting player continues unless the last shot was not made legally.

An object ball knocked off the table is spotted, unless it is the shooters own, in which case it is pocketed.

== Variations ==
=== Alternative group selection ===
A common variation is that the first shooter to legally pocket a ball without a foul (fault) gets to claim any set that they want to be their own. If the break shooter pockets any ball (without fouling), they can claim any set, and continue shooting. The next shooter who legally pockets a ball during their turn gets to claims ownership of one of the two remaining sets. In the advent of a foul break, the first successive shooter to legally pocket a ball gets to claim any set, and the next shooter who legally pockets a ball claims one of the remaining sets.

A less common variation (because it involves risk to the breaker) is that the sets are assigned before the start of play: the breaking shooter has 1–5, the second player has 6–10, and the third has 11–15.

=== Alternative scratch and spotting rules ===
In the event of a cue-ball scratch, each of the fouling player's opponents who were still in the game before the foul may return one of their own pocketed balls to the table. Players who were already "out" before that shot remain out.

In this version, if the shooter pockets both the last remaining opponent object ball and the shooter's own final object ball (i.e. all balls are down but the cue ball), then only a player who was still in the game (typically the shooter and the final opponent) before that last shot may spot a ball; eliminated players do not return to the game. The same shooter continues.

Another variation (regardless of the above spotting rule) that is common in North America is that the incoming player after a scratch receives cue ball in-hand behind the head string (baulk line) only, not in-hand anywhere on the table.

=== More players ===
Team play can be pairs (or more) of players being assigned to each of the three sets of balls and taking alternating turns or (in scotch doubles format) alternating shots during their turn.

The game generally is also playable by five players (or teams), with each owning three balls rather than five. Variant ball sets (with smaller and more numerous balls, and a custom rack for them) have also been manufactured for a larger number of players.

The game is possible with any number of players from two to 15. Because some combinations would result in not all of the players having the same number of balls, sometimes one or more must be taken out of the rack.

- Two players: seven balls each
- Three players: five balls each
- Four or five players: three balls each
- Six or seven players: two balls each
- Eight to 15 players: one ball each

Eagle Pool Balls manufactures a ball set using colored rather than numbered groups of balls, with which three- to five-player cutthroat can be played. It makes use of different sizes and shapes of racks: a standard triangle rack of three groups of five balls each for three players; a custom, large diamond rack of four groups of four balls each for four players; and a standard triangle rack of five groups of three balls each for five players.

=== Multi-game scoring ===
Various point systems may be used to play matches or sets, rather than just one game. With its uniqueness as a three player game, counting games won is possible but does not give credit for finishing second. One system is awarding three points for a win, plus an additional one point for each of the winner's remaining balls at the end of each game. The player last eliminated receives two points, the first eliminated player none. There may also be a bonus awarded for playing a perfect game, sinking both opponents' sets of 5 balls while having all 5 of yours remaining (Usually 2 points, making a perfect game worth 10 points total: 3 for the win, 5 for remaining balls, plus 2 bonus). This system emphasizes strategy regarding whom to eliminate first as the match goes on, often creating alliances of the two trailing players to catch the leader in points. The match may be won by reaching a set number of points, or reaching a set deadline in time.

=== Coin-operated table play ===
When played on coin-operated tables (such that balls cannot be returned to play at will once pocketed, only after paying for another game) a player who scratches selects one of their own balls to be pocketed immediately, in lieu of opponents' balls returning to the table. In the event that a scratch occurs on the same shot that an opponent's ball is pocketed, the affected opponent is permitted to select a ball belonging to the offender which is to be removed instead of the player that scratched choosing the ball to be pocketed. In either case, this can result in the scratching player being "out".
