= Premier Manager 3 =

1994 video game

- Developer(s): Realms of Fantasy
- Publisher(s): Gremlin Interactive
- Designer(s): John Atkinson; Paul Atkinson; Alex Kewin; Tony Casson
- Composer(s): Patrick Phelan
- Series: Premier Manager
- Platform(s): Amiga, MS-DOS
- Release: 1994
- Genre(s): Sports simulation
- Mode(s): Single-player, multiplayer

Premier Manager 3, also known as PM3, is a football management simulator video game for the Amiga and MS-DOS platforms. It was released in 1994 by Gremlin Interactive. The objective of the game is to manage a football club successfully within the top 5 divisions in the English football league system, starting from the 1994–95 football season. The game was re-released a year later to include updated teams and player details for the 1995–96 football season. Gremlin also released Premier Multi-Edit System, a software that allows the user to edit the statistics of football players and teams in Premier Manager 3 to their liking. Premier Manager 3 followed Premier Manager 2. There is an AGA version of Premier Manager 3 as well as a standard version for all Amigas.

== Gameplay ==
Premier Manager 3 is a football management video game that puts the player in charge of a football club. The player has to manage not only the team and tactics to win football matches but also the club's finances, such as applying for bank loans, organising advertising boards, and scheduling stadium improvements. The primary interface is made up of 12 main sections. These are team settings, telephone, fax machine, sponsorship, ground improvements, business case, club finances, transfer market, history, league tables, cup competitions, and the option to play the next match. From this interface, the player can access all the settings necessary to manage the football club.

Premier Manager 3 featured updated match graphics.

When the game starts, the user takes control of a Conference League team of their choice. If the user manages the team poorly and finishes in last position in the league, the team will not be relegated; in real life, a team finishing in the relegation zone would have gone down to what is now Level 7 in the English football league system at the time, although since 2004 two leagues were added between these leagues and the Conference National. To be successful, the user must not only win football matches, but also manage the finances of the club well. If the player is in too much debt then the player can be fired even if he had good results.

The user can change the club he manages by taking job offers from other clubs at the end of the season or applying for a position at a club where a manager has been fired mid season. The managerial rating of the user affects whether or not this application is successful. Premier Manager 3 can be played by two players, although they have to take turns accessing their teams. In a new feature to the series, the users can attempt to outbid each other. Previously in Premier Manager 2, the second user had the advantage of bidding after the first user.

In 1996, Premier Manager 3 Deluxe was released which included the updated league, team and player statistics for the 1995–96 football season.

== Development ==
The tactics system in Premier Manager 3 was the biggest new development in the game, allowing the user to set tactics for individual players during football matches. The team and player statistics were updated for the release to the 1995/96 football season. Premier Manager 3 was re-released again in April 2004 by the holders of the Premier Manager trademark Zoo Digital. It was released on CD ROM with the warning that it will not run on Windows 2000 or Windows XP operating systems.

== Reception ==
Critics received Premier Manager 3 well. Amiga Format rated the game 85% and observed that the game is difficult enough to challenge even experienced players of management sims. CU Amiga rated the game 85% and praised the game for the user friendly interface but also criticised how similar the interface and game in general was similar to Premier Manager 2. The review from Amiga Computing gave the game its "Gold Award" and recommended readers purchase Premier Manager 3. The review also observed how similar the game is to Premier Manager 2, and suggested it may not be worth buying if the players already own the previous two games in the series. Amiga User International magazine did not like Premier Manager 3. The review wrote that it is too similar to its predecessor and the improvements were minimal. The review also attacked the method of playing the game as flawed due to not being able to compare tactics against the opposing team's players. The game was re-released as part of a budget set called Soccer Stars 96, which contained FIFA International Soccer, Kick Off 3, and On the Ball: League Edition. The collection received good reviews in general but it was observed that none of the games, including Premier Manager 3, were as good as more recent football games at the time.

== Multi-Edit System ==
After the release of Premier Manager 3, Gremlin Interactive developed and released the Premier Multi-Edit System. This was separate software that would allow the user to edit statistics of teams, players, stadia, and other in game details. Players can be swapped from team to team, managers could be changed and the football strips altered. This was so the user could update the game as the seasons progressed. This was further emphasised with the subtitle of the software being "You'll never need another management game ... ever!" As a stand-alone product, the Multi-Edit System was received well and received a rating of 86% from CU Amiga. The Multi-Edit System was bundled with the Premier Manager 3 Deluxe release in 1995.
