= Nintendo World =

Brazilian video game magazine

- Editor: Editora Tambor
- Categories: Video game magazine
- Publisher: Conrad Editora
- First issue: 1998; 28 years ago
- Country: Brazil
- Language: Portuguese
- Website: nintendoworld.com.br

Nintendo World was a Brazilian video game magazine, which covers games for the Nintendo Wii, Wii U, 3DS and DS. It was created in 1998 by the Conrad Editora. Initially it covered games for the Nintendo 64 and Game Boy Color consoles, which were very popular in the country at the time and were distributed in the country by the Estrela/Gradiente joint-venture. Over 100 issues have been published as of 2006, and the magazine has been awarded by Nintendo of America for its high readership and for being one of the best quality Nintendo magazines in Latin America. Its current editor is Editora Tambor. From issue 60 onwards, the magazine started featuring content from Nintendo Power. Starting with issue 95 (May/2006), the so-called Wii Invasion began. It wasn't exactly an invasion; it was actually a preparation for the launch of the Wii console. Due to this influx, Nintendo World gradually stopped talking about the GameCube. Despite this, issue 98 (August 2006) featured an article with the headline " The GameCube still reigns!". It detailed the releases still planned for the GameCube.

The magazine went defunct in 2017.
