= Pool Shark 2 =

2004 video game

- Developer(s): Blade Interactive
- Publisher(s): Zoo Digital Publishing
- Platform(s): PlayStation 2, Xbox, Microsoft Windows
- Release: PlayStation 2: EU: 12 November 2004; Xbox, Windows: EU: 19 November 2004
- Genre(s): Sports
- Mode(s): Single-player, multiplayer

Pool Shark 2 (stylized as Pool:shark 2) is a sports video game developed by Blade Interactive and published by Zoo Digital Publishing for the PlayStation 2, Xbox and Microsoft Windows. It is the sequel to Pool Shark.

== Reception ==
Reception

Aggregate score
| Aggregator | Score | | |
| Aggregator | PC | PS2 | Xbox |
|---|---|---|---|
| Metacritic | 54/100 | 77/100 | 71/100 |

Review scores
| Publication | Score | | |
| Publication | PC | PS2 | Xbox |
|---|---|---|---|
| GamesMaster | N/A | 59% | 59% |
| GameStar | 65% | N/A | N/A |
| PlayStation Official Magazine – UK | N/A | 5/10 | N/A |
| Official Xbox Magazine (UK) | N/A | N/A | 8/10 |
| PC Gamer (US) | 54% | N/A | N/A |
| Play | N/A | 77% | N/A |
| PSM3 | N/A | 56% | N/A |

The PlayStation 2 version received "generally favourable reviews", while the PC and Xbox versions received "mixed or average reviews", according to the review aggregation website Metacritic.
