= Actua Soccer =

1995 video game

- Developer: Gremlin Interactive
- Publishers: EU: Gremlin Interactive; NA: Interplay Productions
- Series: Actua Sports
- Platforms: MS-DOS, PlayStation, Saturn
- Release: MS-DOS: EU: 1995; NA: 31 March 1996; PlayStation: EU: March 1996; NA: 31 October 1996; Saturn: EU: 1996; NA: 30 November 1996
- Genre: Sports
- Modes: Single-player, multiplayer

Actua Soccer (VR Soccer in North America) is a sports video game developed and published by Gremlin Interactive for MS-DOS, PlayStation, and Sega Saturn. The game features a variety of teams and leagues to choose from, including national teams and club teams from various countries. Players can create their own teams and customize team kits, as well as participate in various game modes, such as exhibition matches, leagues, and tournaments. Actua Soccer received positive reviews upon its release for its realistic gameplay and depth of features.

== Gameplay ==
Actua Soccer contains only 32 national teams, each containing 22 players. However, in 1996 a new version containing clubs was released: Actua Soccer: Club Edition. It contained 20 Premier League teams from the 1996/1997 season, with players displayed in "Panini-style" photos and with individualised statistics.

== Development ==
This was the first football video game to include a full 3D graphics engine with players rendered as three-dimensional figures. Sheffield-based Gremlin used Sheffield Wednesday's Andy Sinton, Chris Woods and Graham Hyde as motion capture models. Commentary was provided by Barry Davies. The Club Edition was developed using the engine used for Gremlin's previous football title UEFA Euro 96 England.

== Reception ==
Reception

Review score
Publication	Score
AllGame	4/5 (MAC)

Reviewing the Club Edition Saturn Power's Dean Mortlock gave a score of 65/100, criticising "sloppy controls and poor artificial intelligence", and called the game inferior to Worldwide Soccer. Sega Saturn Magazine's Lee Nutter argued that "very little has been changed from its Euro 96 incarnation" and that it lacked "the speed, playability and overall polish of Sega's seemingly untouchable Worldwide Soccer '97". Lisa Savignano of AllGame had similar notes for the gameplay, expressing the learning curve for the controls took time and thinking. A user manual for Mac was not included in the game, adding to the learning difficulty.

In 1996, GamesMaster ranked Actua Soccer 85th on their "Top 100 Games of All Time". By 1997, the game had sold over a million copies for MS-DOS and PlayStation around the world.
