= Club Football =

- Birmingham City release of Club Football 2005 on Xbox
- Genre(s): Sport
- Developer(s): Codemasters
- Publisher(s): Codemasters
- Platform(s): Windows, PlayStation 2, Xbox
- First release: Club Football (2004); 10 October 2003
- Latest release: Club Football (2005); 15 October 2004

Club Football is a series of football video games, developed and published by Codemasters in 2003 and 2004 for PlayStation 2, PC and Xbox.

Each version of the game focuses on a specific club with their official replica stadium, shirt and players. The player can put themselves in the game with their own attributes.

In May 2002 Codemasters announced their intention to bring the series to the GameCube but these releases did not make it to market.

The series was discontinued in 2004, with Gary Dunn, Codemasters' development director, commenting: "We are taking time out to reassess our strategy in the football action genre. It is an extremely competitive market sector and we will take what we have learnt and build on that for future development."

== Versions ==
22 different European clubs and one international side had Club Football releases. They were:

- (Italy) A.C. Milan
- (Netherlands) Ajax
- (England) Arsenal
- (England) Aston Villa
- (Spain) Barcelona
- (Germany) Bayern Munich
- (England) Birmingham City (2004–05 season only)
- (Germany) Borussia Dortmund
- (Scotland) Celtic
- (England) Chelsea
- England
- (Germany) Hamburg
- (Italy) Inter Milan
- (Italy) Juventus
- (England) Leeds United (2003–04 season only)
- (England) Liverpool
- (England) Manchester United
- (France) Marseille (2004–05 season only)
- (England) Newcastle United (2004–05 season only)
- (France) Paris Saint-Germain (2004–05 season only)
- (Scotland) Rangers
- (Spain) Real Madrid
- (England) Tottenham Hotspur (2004–05 season only)

== Reception ==
Reviewing the first set of Club Football releases, Richard Keith of Official PlayStation 2 Magazine gave a score of 7/10, describing it as a "simple, almost pared down footie sim that will be instantly familiar to anyone who has ever played PES or FIFA...knitting together passes, firing in shots and flicking on headers feels right".

Reviews for the subsequent England International Football release were mixed. Keith Stuart of Official PlayStation 2 Magazine lamented "agonisingly ponderous and unpredictable" player responses and "ball physics that make it feel like you're booting a space hopper around", giving a score of 5/10 and dismissing the title as a "mediocre footie simulation that adds nothing to the genre and stumbles behind PES and FIFA like an arthritic goal-keeping coach". CVG's Graeme Boyd was equally damning, scoring the game as 56/100, arguing that it played almost identically to Club Football "save for the tweakiest of tweaks, and suffers from the same problems", criticising the ball physics, unresponsive controls and the erratic AI of computer-controlled players. He also noted the absence of an official European Championship mode despite the England national team licence, comparing the game unfavourably to Electronic Art's Euro 2004, which released shortly afterwards. Writing in Official Xbox Magazine Andy Irving was more positive, providing a score of 8.2/10, describing it as a "competent and intuitive footy sim with fluid play and good AI", and arguing that its online compatibility was "where it shines".
