= UEFA Challenge =

2001 video game

- UEFA Challenge PAL front cover (PS1)
- Developer: Infogrames Sheffield House
- Publisher: Infogrames Europe
- Platforms: PlayStation, PlayStation 2, Microsoft Windows
- Release: PlayStation: EU: 13 April 2001; Microsoft Windows: EU: 4 May 2001; PlayStation 2: EU: 29 June 2001
- Genre: Sports
- Modes: Single-player, multiplayer

UEFA Challenge is a football video game for PlayStation, PlayStation 2 and Microsoft Windows, developed by Infogrames Sheffield House and published by Infogrames Europe in 2001.

== Gameplay ==
This game is lincensed by UEFA and features the biggest football teams and players, each with their own unique playing techniques. Players can engage in friendlies, tournaments and leagues which include promotion and relegation battles. They guide their chosen team and work their way up to the top.
