= Hogs of War =

2000 video game

- PAL cover for the PlayStation release
- Developer: Infogrames Sheffield House
- Publisher: Infogrames
- Directors: Mark Glossop; Alan Coltman
- Programmers: Jacob Habgood; Andrew Fox
- Artists: Ricki Martin; John Guerin; Izzy Stewart
- Platforms: PlayStation, Microsoft Windows
- Release: PlayStation: UK: 16 June 2000; NA: 29 September 2000; Windows: PAL: 3 November 2000
- Genres: Turn-based tactics, artillery game
- Modes: Single-player, multiplayer

Hogs of War is a 2000 turn-based tactics video game developed by Infogrames Sheffield House and published by Infogrames for the PlayStation and Microsoft Windows. The game is set in the First World War-era where anthropomorphic pigs engage in combat. Hogs of War features 3D graphics and both a single-player career mode and offline multiplayer, with voice artistry by British comedic actors Rik Mayall and Marc Silk.

Development on Hogs of War began in 1997 by Gremlin Interactive, which was later purchased by Infogrames in 1999. Initial builds of the game were rough and cancellation was considered, but the game's developers asked for more time. The game received mixed reviews at launch but received high praise for its comedy. It drew numerous comparisons to the Worms series of games, in particular the 1999 game Worms Armageddon. A sequel was announced but never released, although the franchise has had subsequent board and card games and an official remaster is in production. The game is considered by some critics to be a cult classic.

== Gameplay ==
Hogs can use a variety of items, such as the rocket jet pack.

Hogs of War is a turn-based tactics game, where players take turns controlling individual members of their squad of hogs to engage in combat with the opposition, similar to the Worms video game series. Each level is made up of two or more teams of five, loosely based on nations competing in the First World War. During a turn, players takes control of a single squad member in a third-person perspective to move around the map, including jumping over terrain and swimming over bodies of water, yet can only engage in combat when stationary.

Each squad member can be assigned a class type, where they have immediate access to certain weapons and abilities. There are four main class types; heavy gunners that specialize in long-range heavy weapons (mortars, bazookas, rocket launchers, etc.), engineers that specialise in explosives (grenades, land mines, TNT, etc.), espionage that do not appear on the mini map and use sniper rifles and camouflage, and medics that can heal other units in both close and long range. Other than inventory items, players can also gain access to military vehicles, such as tanks and turrets like heavy artillery and pillboxes, as well as stationary buildings like bunkers and hospital tents.

The game features several modes, including a standard deathmatch (either single-player or multiplayer) and a single-player campaign. At the start of each campaign, the player chooses their nation and squad of up to eight characters, who have customisable names. The game features six teams (Note: The six teams are: Tommy's Trotters, Garlic Grunts, Sow-A-Krauts, Uncle Ham's Hogs, Piggystroika, and Sushi Swine. The Italian release swapped Sushi Swine for Suini Bellici.) based as parodies of nations in the First World War, such as "Tommy's Trotters", named after Tommy Atkins), a parody of the United Kingdom portrayed as either incredibly posh or hooligan-like, and use British slang with multiple regional accents. The main objective for the player is to conquer all five regions of the world map, with each region containing five missions against each opposing nation. (Note: The final region contains six missions, and a team made up of members of each of the other nations.) Through the campaign, characters can be promoted as the player progresses through the campaign by earning medals given for completing tasks, such as finishing the level with zero characters felled. The campaign features semi-permadeath, where a character will be permanently lost after three deaths.

== Plot ==
A pig-shaped collection of islands located in the South Pigsific Ocean, known as Saustralasia, has been found to be a rich source of swill (depicted like oil being harvested by pumpjacks) that is described as the "lifeblood of pigs", and that whoever controls the swill controls the world, thus leading to all nations engaging in an all-out war to conquer the region. The chosen national squadron battles through each of Saustralasia's five main regions; Hogshead, Saustralia, Trottsville, Bellyopolis and Arstria.

Upon conquering each territory, the squad is shown an educational film (in a satirical vintage fashion) on survival techniques, such as "keeping secrets safe", a video showing off a secret military project. Upon defeating all other nations and laying claim to the Saustralasian mainland, the squad engages in a final battle on the Isle of Swill with the nationally ambiguous "Team Lard". Regardless of which chosen nation is victorious, all pig nations celebrate the end of the war. Despite this, a remaining soldier feels like nothing has been accomplished by the war. The sergeant I.P. Grimly (Rik Mayall) gives an upbeat message regarding the end of the war, stating that the war was all worth it for the medal received at the end.

== Development and release ==
Hogs of War was created by the founder of Gremlin Interactive, Ian Stewart. He was inspired by the film Babe and by the 1995 video games Command & Conquer and Worms. According to game developer Andrew Fox, the premise of the game was "Worms, except in 3D and with pigs". Development on the game began in 1997 and took 3 years to complete. This long development time was due to Gremlin Interactive being purchased by Infogrames in 1999. Two teams developed the game with a focus on different system versions. One produced the PlayStation (PS1) version and was led by Jacob Habgood, and the other for Windows was led by Fox. All sound and art assets were shared between both platforms while different 3D engines had to be made. The game drew inspiration from the black comedy series Blackadder Goes Forth that was also set in the First World War. The American military march, "The Liberty Bell", composed by John Philip Sousa, was added by Habgood as the game's theme tune. Habgood chose this music as it was in the public domain and fit the mood of the game due to its age and use in the comedy show Monty Python's Flying Circus. The high draw distance and number of polygons that could be used, especially on PlayStation, meant that in order to allow the players to have range, the number of players and other assets had to be cut.

The initial build of the game was described by Habgood as being "slow and hideous". It contained no gameplay elements and the pig characters were tall and humanlike. It was suggested to cancel the game, but the development team asked for more time. The next build was dubbed "Cubes of War" by the developers as it focussed more on gameplay rather than graphics leading to simple cubes replacing the pigs. This was to demonstrate that the gameplay was fun before another build added in graphical improvements for the pigs.

Gremlin Interactive was taken over by the French company Infogrames in 1999, which was a benefit to the game as it provided more time for development. Following the takeover, Infogrames supported the game and continued its development. The company decided they wanted to hire French comedians from the show Les Guignols to voice act in the French version of the game while for the English release Rik Mayall and Marc Silk were hired. Each language version of the game was localised in terms of the comedy, voice work and puns.

Hogs of War was released for the PlayStation in the United Kingdom on 16 June 2000 and in France on 25 August 2000, with a North American release following on 29 September. The game was released for Microsoft Windows in Europe on 3 November the same year.

In October 2003, the now-named Atari sold the assets of Gremlin Interactive, including Hogs of War, to Ian Stewart's Zoo Digital Publishing. The company shortly afterwards reissued Hogs of War under the "Zoo Classics" budget label.

== Reception ==
Reception

Aggregate score
Aggregator	Score
Metacritic	62/100

Review scores
Publication	Score
AllGame	4/5
CNET Gamecenter	7/10
Consoles +	65%
Electronic Gaming Monthly	7/10
Eurogamer	9/10
GameFan	80% (Note: Three critics of GameFan gave the PlayStation version each a score of 71, 84, and 85.)
GameRevolution	C
GameSpot	5.5/10
IGN	7.4/10
Jeuxvideo.com	13/20
Next Generation	4/5
PlayStation Official Magazine – UK	8/10
Official U.S. PlayStation Magazine	4/5
PC Gamer (UK)	85%
Play	90%

The PlayStation version of Hogs of War received "mixed or average" reviews, according to the review aggregation website Metacritic. The game received high praise for its comedic value. Scott Stienberg of IGN praised the "goofy sense of humour and endearing antics" of the game, noting it as a strong contributor to the game, while Frank Provo of GameSpot called the game's comedy "drop-dead funny" and "sidesplitting". Nebojsa Radakovic of GameRevolution said that many of the death quotes are just "hilarious". Greg Orlando of NextGen said he was also appreciative of the game's feel, specifically noting Mayall's performance. Eurogamer described the game as "hilarious", praising the music, sound effects and voice work, also stating that "sound has to be Hogs of War's biggest selling point". In a 4 out of 5 star review, Chris Baker in the Official U.S. PlayStation Magazine called the game the "most pleasant surprise of the year" with praise being given for "the variety of landscapes".

Hogs of War received less positive remarks towards the graphics used. Radakovic stated that the game's graphics were mediocre and the game contained too much texture warping and simple models. Steinburg also called the graphics "strikingly primitive", and the game's graphics were "dated". Provo commented that the games' graphics did "nothing to elicit inspiration or excitement" during a campaign, and also commented that the single-player was dull. J.C. Barnes of AllGame commented that the graphics were simplistic and devoid of fancy textures.

The game drew comparisons to Worms and Worms Armageddon with Radakovic saying that Hogs of War is "essentially a 3D version of Worms" and that "while it brings along some of the positive points of Worms, it fails to capture the same hilarious gameplay, adding little with the new 3D world". A group of reviewers for GameFan went further, saying Hogs of War is similar as "Worms [but] it's missing that charm only Worms can deliver". Provo stated that the "all-around nuttiness" of the game lifted it into the same realm as Bomberman or Worms.

Retrospective reviews of Hogs of War have been positive. In 2012, WhatCulture called Hogs of War a 'forgetten gem'. In 2018, Aaron Birch and Ryan Lambie of Den of Geek ranked Hogs of War 58 out of 60 of the most underrated games of the PlayStation, saying that this turn-based strategy game got a lukewarm reception on its release in 2000, but is now considered to be an overlooked classic. In 2022, GameRant's Martin Geoffrey listed Hogs of War as one of the 10 most unappreciated PS1 games stating that by modern standards it's an "incredibly" dated game, both in terms of visuals and gameplay, but it still remains unique in the gaming landscape. Some critics refer to the game as a cult classic. (Note: Attributed to multiple references:)

== Legacy ==
In February 2008, Infogrames announced Hogs of War 2 for Nintendo DS, Wii, PlayStation 2 and Windows. It was scheduled for release in April 2009, but was never released. During this period, Infogrames was experiencing financial problems and was reincorporated as Atari, SA. Lead programmer Jacob Habgood described the game as being a "European phenomenon" but that it didn't sell well in the United States. Habgood commented that these poor global sales may have been a reason there was never a sequel for the title.

Stone Sword Games created a card game based on the video game called Hogs Of War: The Card Game, which was released in 2020 after being crowdfunded through Kickstarter. This was followed by a crowdfunded board game called Hogs of War: Miniatures Game, which was released in 2022.

The game was reprinted in the “Gremlin Vol. 2” compendium for the Evercade system in 2025.

== Lardcore ==
A remastered edition, known initially as Hogs of War: Reheated and later renamed to Hogs of War Lardcore, started production in March 2019 by the gaming company Urbanscan, with no official release date. The remaster came about after programmer Luke Melville did a Master's degree at Sheffield Hallam University under the supervision of Habgood who gave Melville the original source code. This led to a team being put together under the leadership of Ian Stewart to work on an official remaster. The original pig voices and sound effects will be retained, and two new unlockable teams will be introduced. The game was initially expected to debut on PlayStation 5 and PlayStation 4 by late 2024, but this was later revised to late 2025 by developers. The game will be released on other platforms such as PC and Xbox following the PlayStation release.
