= LMA Manager =

- Cover art for LMA Manager 2001
- Genre: Football management
- Developer: Codemasters
- Publisher: Codemasters
- Platforms: Microsoft Windows, PlayStation, PlayStation 2, Xbox, Xbox 360, J2ME
- First release: LMA Manager (1999)
- Latest release: LMA Manager 2008 (2008)

LMA Manager is a football management video game series developed and published by Codemasters. Developed primarily for consoles, the franchise differs from the PC-based Football Manager and Championship Manager series by focusing on visual details such as a fully 3D match engine, although still maintaining the realism and level of detail craved by fans of the genre - a unique combination when the series was first released.

The series has different titles in different regions: LMA Manager in the UK (named after the League Managers Association), BDFL Manager in Germany (basically the German equivalent of the LMA), Manager de Liga in Spain, Football Manager Campionato in Italy, and FC Manager - La Passion du Foot in France since the 2006 edition (the French edition of the series was previously named Roger Lemerre - La Sélection des Champions after the former coach of the France national team).

== LMA Manager ==
The first LMA Manager video game was released in 1999 for the PlayStation, featuring 8,000 players and 294 clubs in 32 countries.

== LMA Manager 2001 ==
The second LMA game was released - also on PlayStation - in March 2001. Two versions were released, one for the English leagues as before, and another specifically covering the Scottish Premier and Football Leagues. The in-match action is presented by former footballer turned BBC analyst Alan Hansen. Sometimes this version gets caught in between the retro style of the original game, and the 2002 version. Although practically the same as the 2002 version, this contains some differences in the in-match play, and is famed for wingers cutting inside to shoot from ridiculous angles, and goalkeepers who tend to tip shots just inside the far post, making this an often frustrating game. There are also a few mistakes on the game, such as Birmingham City's Bryan Hughes being 29, instead of his proper age at the time, which was 24. It is also occasional for defenders to pick up the ball in their own penalty box, and proceed to kick it out like a keeper, as well as people scoring from their kick-off.

A slight difference from the original is the length of gameplay, in this version finishing after 30 seasons in football management while the previous version finished after 50 seasons.

== LMA Manager 2002 ==
LMA 2002 was the final version in the series to be released on PlayStation, launched on 2 November 2001. Although principally just an update from the 2001 version, the game did prove to be quite a stepping stone from the LMA of old and the LMA seen today.

The first PlayStation 2 incarnation went under the same name when released in April 2002. A significant update from PS1, it allows players to manage in one of six European leagues, all of which are processed by the game simultaneously (the top two divisions in Italy, Spain, Germany and France were added, in addition to the existing top four divisions in England and Scotland). On the PS2, matches play out in full in a 3D match environment, followed by post-match highlights voiced by famous BBC presenter Gary Lineker alongside the returning Hansen. The gameplay advanced in this game from the 2001 version, in particular the in-match style. Players tend to shoot early, from around thirty yards, rather than enter into the penalty area.

== LMA Manager 2003 ==
Originally slated for release in October 2002, but releasing ultimately on 15 November, this was the first edition to be released on Xbox, alongside the PS2 release. This version did not add additional leagues and contained minor enhancements from the previous game.

== LMA Manager 2004 ==
The 2004 edition of LMA Manager incorporated a new 'feel' to the menu; match engine and 'Football One' channel.

The next in the series was released on 12 March 2004 on PS2 and Xbox, and added a variety of enhancements to the match, as well as new commentary in the post-match highlights voiced by renowned commentator Barry Davies and analysed by Lineker and Hansen as before. New 'Fantasy Team' mode was added (replacing the 'Challenge Mode' in earlier games) where the users can build up a team from scratch using a preallocated budget, based loosely on the popular fantasy football game. Once the user compiles a squad and selects a team name, stadium and kit, the newly created club would compete in one of the leagues in the game. Another new feature in this version is the option (on Xbox only) of issuing tactical instructions to player's team via the Xbox Communicator headset during a match. A second edition of the game was released, updating the squads from the January 2004 transfer window.

== LMA Manager 2005 ==
LMA 2005 was released on PS2 and Xbox on 31 October 2004, and chief amongst the enhancements is the addition of the Dutch and Portuguese leagues and English Football Conference division, the first new playable leagues to be added since 2002. Another unique feature was the option to download a mid-season player roster update via Xbox Live or the PlayStation online service, and the second edition release had the updated squads by default at the expense of the online features. PS2 owners with access to an EyeToy camera can take a photo of themselves, which would appear on various newspaper articles seen in the game (for example, a celebration photo after winning a trophy, or an unhappy image after being sacked by their club).

== Manchester United Manager 2005 ==
At the same time as the normal version of LMA 2005, a special themed edition was also released on PS2 and Xbox, entitled Manchester United Manager. As the name suggests, this version is tailored around Manchester United, and contains various photos and video clips of the club, but the game itself was unchanged from LMA, allowing players to manage any club, not just Manchester United.

== LMA Professional Manager 2005 ==
Released alongside LMA 2005 and Manchester United Manager, this version was notable for two reasons - it is the first game in the series to be released on PC, and the first developed externally (by Kuju rather than Codemasters). The change of platform required a redesigned interface, with the straightforward joypad-based navigation of PS2 replaced by a mouse-driven control system more similar to a graphical user interface such as Microsoft Windows. Each screen the user progressed to was housed on a separate window, which made finding one's way from section to section rather awkward.

Content-wise, the PC version contains the same playable leagues, 3D match engine and transfer system as the console version, although there are extra non-playable countries added from around the world to bolster the transfer market.

== LMA Manager 2006 ==
LMA 2006 was released on 18 November 2005 for PS2 and Xbox, with a further three playable divisions included from Dutch and Portuguese leagues, as well as further enhancements to the 3D match, transfer market and player training setup (including playable 3D Training Matches for the first time). The Xbox version included the ability to upload high scores via Xbox Live. In keeping with the series' visual roots, a new option allows players to create a 3D model of their manager, who can be seen pacing along the touchlines during a match or featuring in one of the new video headlines (introducing a new transfer signing to the press, for example) included in the game world's TV station.

The game has a complex transfer process, with the ability to swap players and give instalments, but the game limits the player to only having four transfers made via contract clauses (i.e. 10% sell on clause or £75,000 to be transferred after fifteen appearances). Using contract clauses, the players can usually pick the player up for a cheaper transfer fee than what players would if they didn't use a contract clause, but after they use all four and try to use another, it will say that the club who the player currently plays for cannot afford to let him go. Once the players sell anyone they have used with a contract clause, they may then buy a player using another contract clause.

After the third-party conversion of LMA Professional Manager 2005, a second PC version was developed by Codemasters themselves and was scheduled for release in Spring 2006 alongside the first seventh-generation iteration on Xbox 360, but these versions' development slipped back, making LMA Manager 2007 a tri-format release.

== LMA Manager 2007 ==
LMA 2007 was released on 22 September 2006 on PS2, PC-DVD, and Xbox 360, with transfer updates available for download. Like other versions of the PC, it uses a graphical user interface like LMA 2005. Its main theme is "Hands Open", by Snow Patrol. Due to the lack of subsequent titles, and the fact that the PC version of LMA 2007 would not run on Windows Vista and Windows 7 due to its use of a StarForce DRM, and its limited availability on 7th generation games consoles, alongside the growing popularity of the Football Manager series, the LMA series became effectively defunct.

== LMA Manager 2008 ==
LMA Manager 2008 was developed by Glu Mobile and released on mobile on January 23, 2008.
