= Premier Manager =

Association football management video game series

- Covert art for Premier Manager 2003–04 on the Game Boy Advance
- Genre: Sports management
- Developers: Dinamic Multimedia; Realms of Fantasy; Runecraft; Urbanscan Limited, Zoo Digital Publishing
- Publishers: Focus Entertainment; Gremlin Interactive; Zoo Digital Publishing
- Platforms: Amiga, Atari ST, MS-DOS, Game Boy Advance , Mega Drive, Windows, Nintendo 64 PlayStation, PlayStation 2, PlayStation 3
- First release: Premier Manager; 1992
- Latest release: Premier Manager 2012 (Windows); 2012

Premier Manager is a series of a football management simulation video games started in 1992. Published by Gremlin Interactive, it was first developed by Realms of Fantasy, later passed to Spanish company Dinamic Multimedia. The later games were later published and developed by Zoo Digital Publishing (later renamed as Zushi Games), who bought the rights from Infogrames and hired some members of the original Gremlin staff. The latest releases in the series were developed by Urbanscan Limited, a company established by Gremlin founder Ian Stewart.

== Games ==
- Premier Manager is the debut game in the series for the Amiga, MS-DOS, and Atari ST. Developed by Realms of Fantasy and published by Gremlin Graphics in 1992, this game allows up to 4 players to manage a team in the FA Conference League. Premier Manager was also released for the Mega Drive in 1995.
- Premier Manager 2 is similar to Premier Manager. Released in 1993, it now has a maximum of 2 players. There are increased functions in this version. It was developed for the same platforms as its predecessor. The Mega Drive version of Premier Manager is based on Premier Manager 2.
- Premier Manager 3 is a refined version of Premier Manager 2. It featured full match graphics plus customisable formations. Gremlin Interactive later released the Premier Multi-Edit system, allowing players to edit the built-in player and team data. A Deluxe version was released which updated the player data to the new season. It was released for Amiga and MS-DOS.
- Premier Manager 97 is the first game not developed by Gremlin Interactive, with development shifting to Spanish developer Dinamic Software, who made the popular PC Fútbol series. The game was PC Fútbol 5 without arcade mode. For the first time, it gave the player the option to coach a Premiership team from the start. It was released for Windows and Mega Drive.
- Premier Manager 98 is just a simple database update of Premier Manager 97. It turned to be the last game to achieve moderate success and positive reviews in the series. It was released for Windows in 1997 and PlayStation in 1998.
- Premier Manager: Ninety Nine was released only in Europe in 1999 for Windows, PlayStation, and Nintendo 64. The Nintendo 64 version was released as Premier Manager 64. This title was the final game in the series released by Gremlin.
- Premier Manager 2000 was developed by Infogrames Studios and published by Infogrames. It was released in 2000 for PlayStation. In 2003 it was given a budget re-release by the new Premier Manager intellectual property owners Zoo Digital Publishing.
- Premier Manager 2002/2003 Season was developed by Runecraft and published by Zoo Digital Publishing, releasing for PlayStation 2 in November 2002 and for Windows the following year.
- Premier Manager 2003–04 was the first title in the series developed and published by Zoo Digital Publishing, releasing for Windows, PlayStation 2, and Game Boy Advance in November 2003.
- Premier Manager 2004–2005 was developed and published by Zoo Digital Publishing, releasing for Windows, PlayStation 2, and Game Boy Advance in November 2004.
- Premier Manager 2005–2006 was developed and published by Zoo Digital Publishing, releasing for Windows, PlayStation 2, and Game Boy Advance in August 2005.
- Premier Manager 2006–2007 was developed and published by Zoo Digital Publishing, releasing for PC Windows and PlayStation 2 in August 2006.
- Premier Manager 08 was developed and published by Zoo Digital Publishing, releasing for PC Windows and PlayStation 2 in August 2007.
- Premier Manager 09 was developed and published by Zoo Digital Publishing, releasing for PC Windows and PlayStation 2 in August 2008.
- Premier Manager 10 was developed and published by Zushi Games, releasing for PC Windows in 2009.
- Premier Manager was developed by Urbanscan and released for PlayStation 3 (via PlayStation Network download only) in July 2010, featuring teams from the 2010–11 English, Italian, Spanish, French, German, and Scottish Leagues.
- Premier Manager 2012 was released by Urbanscan for PlayStation 3 in November 2011 and PC Windows in February 2012.

== See also ==
- Championship Manager (1992–2016)
- Football Manager (1982–1992)
- Football Manager (since 2004)
