= Gremlin Interactive =

British video game developer

Infogrames Studios Limited
- Logo used from 1994 to 2000
- Formerly: Gremlin Graphics Software Limited (1984–1994); Gremlin Interactive Limited (1994–2000)
- Type: Subsidiary
- Industry: Video games
- Founded: 1984; 42 years ago
- Founder: Ian Stewart; Kevin Norburn
- Defunct: 2003; 23 years ago
- Fate: Dissolved; assets acquired by Zoo Digital, later reacquired by Urbanscan.
- Successor: Sumo Digital
- Headquarters: Sheffield, England
- Key people: Ian Stewart (Founder)
- Parent: Infogrames (1999–2003)

Gremlin Graphics Software Limited, later Gremlin Interactive Limited and ultimately Infogrames Studios Limited, was a British video game developer based in Sheffield, South Yorkshire. Like many software houses established in the 1980s, its primary market was the 8-bit range of home computers such as the ZX Spectrum, Amstrad CPC, MSX, Commodore 16 and Commodore 64. The company was acquired by French video game publisher Infogrames in 1999 and was renamed Infogrames Studios in 2000. Infogrames Studios closed down in 2003.

== History ==
The company, originally a computer store called Just Micro, was established as a software house in 1984 with the name Gremlin Graphics Software Ltd by Ian Stewart and Kevin Norburn with US Gold's Geoff Brown owning 75% of the company until mid-1989. Gremlin's early success was based on games such as Wanted: Monty Mole for the ZX Spectrum and Thing on a Spring for the Commodore 64. In 1991, the company signed a North American distribution deal with Konami where Konami would distribute Gremlin Graphics' titles in North America for a few years on home computers. In 1993, the company later entered a deal with GameTek where GameTek would release Gremlin's titles in North America.

In 1994, it was renamed as Gremlin Interactive, now concentrating on the 16-bit, PC and console market. Gremlin enjoyed major success with the Zool and Premier Manager series in the early 1990s, and then with Actua Soccer, the first football game in full 3D; other successful games included the Lotus racing series; a futuristic racing game, Motorhead; a stunt car racing game, Fatal Racing (1995); and the 1998 flight simulator Hardwar. Following EA's success with the EA Sports brand, Gremlin also released its own sports videogame series, adding Golf, Tennis and Ice Hockey to its Actua Sports series. During this time, it used a motif from the Siegfried Funeral March from Götterdämmerung as introductory music.

The company was floated on the stock market to raise funds.

In 1997, Gremlin acquired Imagitec Design and DMA Design (creators of Grand Theft Auto and Lemmings). In 1999, it itself was bought by Infogrames for around £24 million and renamed "Infogrames Sheffield House". Infogrames closed the studio in 2003. The building it latterly occupied near Devonshire Green has since been demolished when Infogrames Sheffield House was supposed to be renamed "Atari Sheffield House". In October 2003, Zoo Digital, the successor company to Gremlin, purchased the company's assets from the now-named Atari.

Following the administration of Zoo Digital (later renamed Zushi Games), Gremlin Interactive's catalogue and name were bought up by Ian Stewart's new company Urbanscan.

The Gremlin trademarks (including the g Gremlin logo) are now owned by Warner Bros Entertainment.

== Key staff ==
Gremlin staff had included:

- Antony Crowther – Designer, programmer
- Ian Stewart – Managing director
- Kevin Norburn – Operations director
- Chris Shrigley – Designer / Programmer
- Peter Harrap – Programmer
- Chris Kerry – Programmer
- Shaun Hollingworth – Programmer

== Video games ==
=== As Gremlin Graphics / Gremlin Interactive ===
- Monty Mole series (1984–1990)
  - Wanted: Monty Mole (1984)
  - Monty Is Innocent (1985)
  - Monty on the Run (1985)
  - Auf Wiedersehen Monty (1987)
  - Moley Christmas (1987)
  - Impossamole (1990)
- Potty Pigeon (1984)
- Bounder (1985)
  - Re-Bounder (1987)
- Grumpy Gumphrey Supersleuth (1985)
- Gauntlet (1985)
  - Gauntlet: The Deeper Dungeons (1987)
- Thing on a Spring (1985)
- Zone X (1985)
- Jack the Nipper (1986)
  - Jack the Nipper II: In Coconut Capers (1987)
- Trailblazer (1986)
  - Cosmic Causeway: Trailblazer II (1987)
- Alternative World Games (1987)
- Basil the Great Mouse Detective (1987)
- Deflektor (1987)
- Gary Lineker's Superstar Soccer (1987)
- Technocop (1988)
- Motor Massacre (1988)
- Dark Fusion (1988)
- Mickey Mouse: The Computer Game (1988)
- The Muncher (1988)
- Axel's Magic Hammer (1989)
- Federation of Free Traders (1989)
- H.A.T.E.: Hostile All-Terrain Encounter (1989)
- Switchblade (1989)
  - Switchblade II (1991)
- Greg Norman's Shark Attack!: The Ultimate Golf Simulator (1990)
- Lotus series (1990–1992)
  - Lotus Esprit Turbo Challenge (1990)
  - Lotus Turbo Challenge 2 (1991)
  - Lotus III: The Ultimate Challenge (1992)
- Skidz (1990)
- Super Cars (1990)
  - Super Cars II (1991)
- Toyota Celica GT Rally (1990)
- Venus The Flytrap (1990)
- HeroQuest (1991)
  - HeroQuest II: Legacy of Sorasil (1994)
- BSS Jane Seymour (aka Spacewrecked) (1990)
- Team Suzuki (1991)
- Utopia: The Creation of a Nation (1991)
- Harlequin (1992)
- Jeep Jamboree: Off Road Adventure (1992)
- Nigel Mansell's World Championship Racing (1992)
- Plan 9 from Outer Space (1992)
- Premier Manager series (1992–2000)
  - Premier Manager (1992)
  - Premier Manager 2 (1993)
  - Premier Manager 3 (1994)
  - Premier Manager 97 (1996)
  - Premier Manager 98 (1997)
  - Premier Manager: Ninety Nine (1999)
- Space Crusade (1992)
- Top Gear (1992)
  - Top Gear 2 (1993)
  - Top Gear 3000 (1995)
- Zool (1992)
  - Zool 2 (1993)
- Jungle Strike (1993)
- Litil Divil (1993)
- Full Throttle: All-American Racing (1994)
- K240 (1994)
- Newman/Haas IndyCar featuring Nigel Mansell (1994)
- Race Days (1994)
- Shadow Fighter (1994)
- Actua Sports series (1995–1999)
  - Actua Soccer (1995)
  - Actua Golf (1996)
  - Actua Soccer 2 (1997)
  - Actua Golf 2 (1998)
  - Actua Ice Hockey (1998)
  - Actua Tennis (1998)
  - Actua Soccer 3 (1998)
  - Actua Pool (1999)
  - Actua Ice Hockey 2 (1999)
  - Actua Golf 3 (1999)
  - UEFA Euro 96 England (1996)
- Fatal Racing (1995)
- Loaded (1995)
  - Re-Loaded (1996)
- Slipstream 5000 (1995)
- Normality (1996)
- Hardcore 4X4 (1996)
- Fragile Allegiance (1996)
- Realms of the Haunting (1997)
- Monopoly (1997)
- Buggy (1998)
- Motorhead (1998)
- N2O (1998)
- Body Harvest (1998)
- Hardwar (1998)
- Virtual Tennis (1999)
- Wild Metal Country (1999)
- Soulbringer (2000)

=== As Infogrames Sheffield House ===
Year	Title	Platform(s)	Publisher(s)
1999	PGA European Tour Golf	PlayStation	Infogrames
2000	Premier Manager 2000	PlayStation	Infogrames
2000	Hogs of War	PlayStation, Windows	Infogrames
2000	PGA European Tour Golf	Nintendo 64	Infogrames
2000	Wacky Races	Dreamcast	Infogrames
2001	UEFA Challenge	PlayStation, PlayStation 2, Windows	Infogrames
2001	Wacky Races: Starring Dastardly and Muttley	PlayStation 2	Infogrames
2002	Slam Tennis	PlayStation 2, Xbox	Infogrames
2002	Superman: Shadow of Apokolips	PlayStation 2	Infogrames
2002	Micro Machines	PlayStation 2, Xbox	Infogrames
2003	Superman: Shadow of Apokolips	GameCube	Infogrames
2003	Micro Machines (2002)	GameCube	Infogrames

== See also ==
- Sumo Digital: Game developer founded by former members of Gremlin management.
