= Zushi Games =

British video game publisher

- Type: Private
- Industry: Video games
- Founded: 1999
- Defunct: 2010
- Fate: Administration
- Headquarters: Sheffield, England

Zushi Games was a British video game publisher. Based in Sheffield, South Yorkshire, Zushi is the owner of the multi-million-selling Premier Manager series and best known for Alien Hominid (2005). Zushi published titles for the Nintendo DS, Wii, Game Boy Advance, PlayStation 2, PC and Xbox.

== History ==
=== Zoo Digital Publishing (original company) ===
The company was founded in 1999 by Ian Stewart, who was one of the three founders of Gremlin Interactive. In 2002, the company merged with Digital Worldwide, who distributed the titles of Destination Software for the European market.

In October 2003, the company acquired the ex-Gremlin assets from Atari (ex-Infogrames). The purchase included the Actua Sports and Premier Manager series, alongside several other titles including Hogs of War and Judge Dredd. Zoo would reissue the titles under the "Zoo Classics" budget range starting from late 2003.

=== Zushi Games ===
On 23 April 2008, GreenScreen Interactive Software announced the acquisition of the company which would be combined with Destination Software into the new Zoo Games label. In November 2008, only a few months as a subsidiary of GreenScreen Interactive Software, they regained independency through a management buyout.

In March 2009, the company was renamed to Zushi Games. On 18 March 2010, Zushi went into administration and has a receivership action on at least one of its properties. Following the closure, Ian Stewart would then found a new company called Urbanscan Limited, who then purchased the ex-Gremlin Interactive assets from Zushi. Several employees of the company would found Funbox Media, who acquired several of Zushi's previous titles.

== Selected games ==
Zoo Digital Publishing logo

- Alien Hominid (2005), Game Boy Advance, Mobile phone, PlayStation 2, Xbox
- Lionel Trains: On Track (2007), Nintendo DS
- Need for Speed: Porsche Unleashed (2004), Game Boy Advance
- Pac-Man World (2004), Game Boy Advance
- Pac-Man World 2 (2005), Game Boy Advance
