= Patrick Phelan (composer) =

British video game audio composer, manager, and producer

Patrick "Pat" Phelan is a video game audio composer, manager, and producer.

== Background ==
At the age of 11, Phelan's parents bought him a VIC-20. He learnt how to program and began to write games. At age 13, he got his first synthesizer, a Korg MS20 and learning how to program the MS20's patch bay gave him his grounding in understanding the fundamentals of sound synthesis.

A few years later, the VIC was replaced with a Commodore 64. Soon there was a confluence between his gaming obsession and his love for sound and music. Influenced by Rob Hubbard and Ben Daglish, Phelan began to write music specifically for games. When he progressed to the Atari ST, Phelan began collecting keyboards and using the ST's built-in MIDI connectors, started to sequence complex arrangements, classical scores as well as audio for high-powered games.

In the early 1990s, Phelan joined Gremlin Graphics and was involved in the development of Zool. Later on, he took on other responsibilities and managed the audio department before eventually moving into more senior creative roles.

Phelan left to set up Full Circle where he provided audio solutions for games, music for TV, consultancy and games design services. His clients included Infogrames, Climax, Headfirst and The BBC.

== Games developed ==
Some of the games Phelan helped develop include:

- Doctor Who: The Adventure Games
- Outrun Online Arcade
- Disney's A Christmas Carol
- New International Track & Field
- Driver 76
- Spooks
- Micro Machines
- Slam Tennis
- Alone in the Dark: The New Nightmare
- Shadow Fighter
- UEFA Challenge
- Motorhead
- N2O: Nitrous Oxide
- Soulbringer
- PGA European Tour
- Hardwar
- Top Gear 2
- Actua Soccer series
- Judge Dredd
- Actua Golf 2
- Realms of the Haunting
- Fightbox
- Normality
- Sand Warriors
- Loaded
- Actua Ice Hockey series
- Hogs of War
- Slipstream 5000
- Fatal Racing
- Utopia
- K240
- Fragile Allegiance
- Retribution
- Litil Divil
- Lotus series
- Zool
- Premier Manager series

== Current status ==
Phelan joined Sumo Digital in 2005 he now works as an Audio Director.

Phelan, a member of TIGA (The Independent Game Developers Association) and Gamerepublic (an Independent Trade Alliance), lives in England.
