= Karl Hörnell =

Swedish game developer and cartoonist

- Born: April 26, 1970 (age 55); Uppsala, Sweden
- Occupation: Programmer
- Notable work: Velocipede II, Clean Up Time, Fungus, Clean Up Service
- Website: Java on the Brain

Karl Hörnell (born April 26, 1970) is a programmer and cartoonist based in Sweden. He is best known for his work as a freelance video game developer during the 1980s and 1990s, during which time he was considered the most prominent member of Sweden's nascent game development industry. During a short but extremely prolific period in the 1980s, he created several widely-known Commodore 64 games from scratch for the Interceptor Micros Players label while still a teenager at school, including Velocipede II (1986) and Fungus (1986). While he had developed a mostly-complete C64 version of Fungus 2, what he considered to be his magnum opus, by 1990, Interceptor refused to publish the game, citing the fact that they now only released multi-platform games. At this point, his Commodore 64 was no longer working properly, causing him to exit game development at the time, as he could not afford to replace it.

He later self-published Iceblox (1996) and Iceblox Plus (2003) for browser and mobile. Additionally, he created a number of browser-based Java applet video game clones for his website, Java on the Brain, and one of the world's first online poker games, handling all its coding and graphics, which he sold for £400 million, receiving 12.3% of the sale price, enough to make him independently wealthy. Nevertheless, Hörnell chose to continue working as a programmer. He returned to indie game development yet again planning to release his first iOS in 2014.

Beyond his game development career, Hörnell drew various artwork and cartoons, including the parody comic Savage Dragonbert: Full Frontal Nerdity, a mashup of the Savage Dragon superhero comics and Dilbert.

== Early life ==
Hörnell grew up in Uppsala, Sweden, where, in 1982, his first experience with video games was via his neighbor's Atari VCS. He soon convinced his parents to buy him a Commodore 64 (known as a VIC 64 in Sweden). While initially disappointed it was not compatible with the computers of his friends, he realized that it was an even more powerful machine. He taught himself machine code due to the lack of good Swedish courses at the time and began coding his own video game clones, having created several by the age of 14, and drawn his own cassette box art using the label of an imaginary software house. He won both first and second place in a 1984 software competition held by the magazine VIC-Rapport, as there was almost no competition to speak of, and was hailed as the leading Swedish game developer at the time. Emboldened by this, submitted his games to Interceptor Micros. While he was only expecting feedback, the company offered to publish several of his games under the budget Players label, starting with Fruity, about a trampolinist grabbing fruit from trees, and Ronald Rubberduck, in which the player controls a rubber duck, from 1985 to 1986. This was followed up by Velocipede, a game similar to the 1982 Moon Patrol that featured Swedish flags in the background and Easter egg references to other games he enjoyed, and Clean Up Time (1986), a co-op game inspired by Super Pipeline II (1985). While he did not think his games were ready for the commercial market, they nevertheless exceeded the quality of shovelware titles at the time. He was paid £250 for each of these first four releases, preferring the single payment to receiving royalties, as he assumed the games would not sell. He was given full creative control over the games otherwise.

Hörnell got the assistance of classmates to develop his games; F. Wootz and B. Eklund would type in hexadecimal due to Karl's code being written on paper first. J. Vessby additionally provided music for some of the games. Due to the lack of people to playtest the games, they were all very challenging. He started from scratch with each game, besides the code for playing music, which he reused for convenience. The next title Hörnell developed was Fungus (1986), an endless runner-style game, which was well-received enough that he was invited to England to finish the game, and got traction in the British gaming press. A subsequent game, Toadforce (1986), was inspired by Zoids and a drawing he made of a mechanical toad. His next games included Melonforce (1987) and Clean Up Service (1987), one of his best titles to see publication. While Hörnell planned to release Fungus 2 in 1990, a game he considered his magnum opus, the game was considered outdated due to still being a Commodore 64 title, and Interceptor refused to publish it. This ultimately caused him to leave development entirely, because he was so used to his Commodore 64 he refused to switch to newer hardware, but could not afford a replacement. Hörnell then left for university to study engineering.

== Later game development career ==
Hörnell returned to development in the 1990s again, learning Java and making a number of browser games for Java on the Brain, his personal website. Disney Online purchased the browser games 3-D Blox and Car Jam in 1997, and they debuted on Disney.com, with the latter being renamed Autocrazy, and, later, The Love Bug Game, after it was reskinned based on the contemporaneous film The Love Bug. This additionally paid off when he developed one of the first online poker games right as online gambling exploded. Major companies offered to purchase the game, allowing his family to sell it in 2004 for a large sum of money, £400 million, from which he received 12.3%. He continued developing games for iOS under Eweguo AB, Don's Dugout (2017), Stratosphere: Gravity Rush (2018), Rail Shuffle (2019), Inbread, and Psychophant. Hörnell cited Dig Dug and Paradroid as two of his favorite games of all time, and ones that had an influential effect on his development.

== Works ==
- Fruity (1986)
- Ronald Rubberduck (1986)
- Velocipede (1986)
- Clean Up Time (1986)
- Velocipede II (1986)
- Fungus (1986)
- Toadforce (1986)
- Melonforce (1987)
- Clean Up Service (1987)
- Rubik Unbound (1996)
- Don's Dugout (1996)
- Iceblox (1996)
- Warp (1996)
- Autocrazy (1996)
- 3-D Blox (1996)
- Iceblox Plus (2003)
- Rail Shuffle (2012)

=== Publications ===
- Hörnell, Karl (1999). Runge-Kutta Time Step Selection for Flow Problems (PhD thesis). Uppsala University: Acta Universitatis Upsaliensis. ISBN 91-554-4374-5.
- Hörnell, Karl (w, a). Savage Dragonbert: Full Frontal Nerdity (2002). Image Comics.
- Hörnell, Karl (2024). Singularity Minus Twelve. ISBN 978-9153104827.
