= Denizen =

Denizen may refer to:

- An inhabitant of a place
- Denizen (film), a 2010 feature film directed, written and produced by J.A. Steel
- Denizen (video game), a computer game published by Players Software in 1988
- Denizen, a brand of the clothing company Levi Strauss & Co.
- Denization, an obsolete common-law process by which a foreigner gained some rights of a British subject
- Denizen 1998, the New Yoke City counterpart of Big from Sonic Prime
