= Switchblade II =

1991 video game

- Original Amiga cover art
- Developers: Gremlin Graphics; Core Design (ST); Optimus Software (Lynx)
- Publishers: Gremlin Graphics: Amiga Re-release; EU: GBH Gold Atari ST Original release; EU: Gremlin Graphics Re-release; EU: GBH Atari Lynx; NA/EU: Atari Corporation BlackBerry; WW: Amiga, Inc.
- Programmer: George Allan
- Artist: Paul Gregory
- Composer: Barry Leitch
- Series: Switchblade
- Platforms: Amiga, Atari Lynx, Atari ST, BlackBerry
- Release: 1991: Amiga; EU: 1991 Atari ST Original release; EU: May 1991 Re-release; EU: 1992 Lynx; NA: October 1992; EU: 1992 BlackBerry; WW: 30 April 2013
- Genres: Action-platform, run and gun
- Mode: Single-player

Switchblade II is a 1991 side-scrolling action-platform run and gun video game originally developed and published by Gremlin Graphics in Europe for the Amiga home computers. It is the sequel to the original Switchblade, which was solely created by Simon Phipps at Core Design and released earlier in 1989 across multiple platforms. Despite being primarily developed in the UK, its graphics had a distinctly Japanese style similar to anime or manga.

Taking place several centuries after the events of the first game, the story follows a descendant of the original protagonist named Hiro, as he embarks on a journey to defeat Havok, the original main antagonist who has returned from his previous defeat in order to bring chaos upon the land of Cyberworld and its inhabitants after the Blade Knights ceased to exist. Its gameplay consists of run and gun action mixed with platforming and exploration elements, with a main single-button configuration. Originally released for the Amiga microcomputers, Switchblade II was later ported to the Atari ST in May 1991 and the Atari Lynx handheld in 1992, with the latter being published by Atari Corporation in North America and Europe.

Upon its original release on the Amiga, Switchblade II garnered very positive reception from critics who praised multiple aspects of the title such as the visuals, sound effects and gameplay. The Atari ST version also received positive reception from reviewers for its graphics and gameplay, while the Lynx version was met with a more mixed reception. Despite the positive reviews, programmer George Allan was criticized for the lack of enemies and as a result of this, Allan wanted to make a significantly faster title, which would eventually become the popular Zool.

== Gameplay ==
Amiga version screenshot

Switchblade II is a side-scrolling action-platform game with run and gun elements similar to the original Switchblade where the player takes control of Hiro through six stages of varying thematic set in the land of Thraxx at Cyberworld infested with mechanoid, metal-clad enemies where the main objective is to fully destroy the returning Havok once and for all. All of the actions in the game are performed differently depending on the version, with one button and a joystick in the home computer versions, while the d-pad and two buttons are used in the Lynx port. The progression structure between levels is also different between each version, with the Amiga and Atari ST versions transitioning seamlessly, while the Lynx port is broken into several sections instead. Spread across the levels are portals that lead into a shop where items and weapons can be bought including a knife, homing missiles, laser beam, flamethrower and shurikens, in addition to ammunition for each of them. These items are bought with orbs left by enemies after destroying them. In some stages, levels are interconnected with a network of subterranean bases, where unexplored areas of the screen are obscured from view until the player's character enters them as with the first game.

== Plot ==
The plot summary of Switchblade II varies between each version. In the original Amiga and Atari ST versions, the game is set several centuries after the last of the Blade Knights, Hiro, defeated the evil Havok and saved the land of Cyberworld from his influence. Under the leadership of Hiro, peace returned with the resurfacing of the knights acting as protectors, who enjoyed both respect and devotion from the inhabitants but their outlook on the knights changed negatively as time progressed, as they were starting to regard them as foolish and needless policemen who wasted valuable resources, before their number decreased and eventually disappeared once again. After this event, darkness returned and brought chaos to the land that signalized the return of Havok, who was not fully destroyed by the original Hiro and waited for the Blade Knights' second demise for his comeback to take over Cyberworld and its people, who were deciding between submitting to the leadership of Havok or die before doing so. Taetomi, the eldest person during the dispute, considered the Blade Knights' second demise as a massive mistake from their part and the many elements they took for granted also vanished as well, however he also mentioned the existence of a descendant from the former Blade Knights leader's lineage named Hiro, who has been taught with the way of the knights and knows the full risk in attempting to defeat Havok again without the now-decimated Switchblade with nothing but the knights' ancient weapons.

In the Atari Lynx version, it is implied that the original Hiro from the first game is the main protagonist, as he was granted immortality after defeating Havok 200 years ago, who survived the confrontation and vowed to return one day, with Hiro preparing himself once again in defeating him completely.

== Development ==
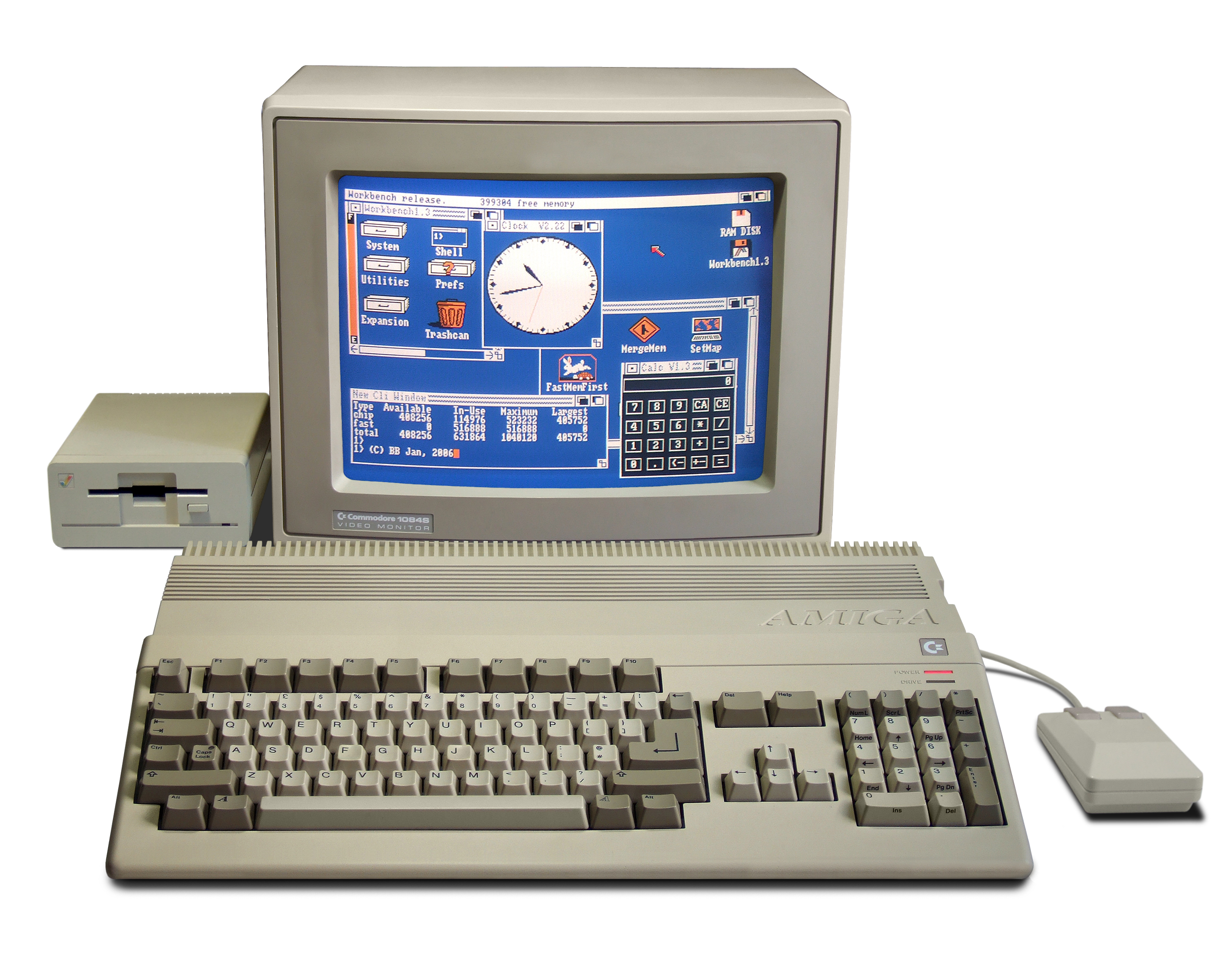
Switchblade II was first developed for the Amiga hardware over the course of 6-8 months.

Switchblade II first began its development process on the Amiga in August 1990 and it was solely written by programmer George Allan over the course of six to eight months, who previously worked on Venus The Flytrap alongside artist Paul Gregory at Gremlin Graphics. Both Allan and Gregory had free rein on the project and were influenced by various arcade games such as Midnight Resistance, Shinobi and Strider, as well as the first Switchblade in order to give the project a "home console" feel. In a February 1991 issue of The One, Allan said that "the idea behind the new game was to give it more of a coin-op feel, so the gameplay is a lot faster".

Allan said that they planned on using the system's EHB Mode early in development for backgrounds and sprites, while the project as a whole bears resemblance to Japanese-developed titles from the era due to Gregory's fascination with the art style. The game runs at 50 frames per second and its maps were created as 16x16 pixel tiles. Several gameplay elements and ideas, however, were scrapped due to memory and time constrains. Original Switchblade author Simon Phipps had no direct involvement in the development of the game, although Allan has claimed to have briefly met with Phipps in a 2012 interview with the website Amiga Lore.

== Release ==
Swtichblade II was first released on the Amiga on Europe in 1991 and while it was the lead format of the second Switchblade game, it was not widely ported to the other platforms unlike the first. The game was later ported to the Atari ST in May 1991 by the same team with Alex Davies assisting in the porting process at Core Design, featuring less colors than the original version. It was also ported to the Atari Lynx by Optimus Software and released on North America and Europe by Atari Corporation in 1992, although the former are not credited as such in-game and this version was first showcased to the attendees at SCES '92 before being published late on the same year.

A conversion for the Famicom was being developed by Kemco and planned for a 1993 release.

== Reception ==
Reception
Publication	Scores		
Publication	Amiga	Atari ST	Lynx
ACE	900 / 1000	—N/a	—N/a
Aktueller Software Markt	10 / 12	—N/a	—N/a
AllGame	—N/a	—N/a	1.5/5
Amiga Action	90% 82%	—N/a	—N/a
Amiga Computing	90%	—N/a	—N/a
Amiga Format	70% 79%	—N/a	—N/a
Amiga Games	79%	—N/a	—N/a
Amiga Joker	68%	—N/a	—N/a
Amiga Mania	90%	—N/a	—N/a
Amiga Power	87% 5/5	—N/a	—N/a
Atari ST User	—N/a	90%	—N/a
CU Amiga	90%	—N/a	—N/a
GamePro	—N/a	—N/a	15.5 / 20
Game Zero Magazine	—N/a	—N/a	79.5 / 100
Génération 4	90%	90%	—N/a
IGN	—N/a	—N/a	5.0 / 10
Joypad	—N/a	—N/a	85%
Joystick	91%	88%	85%
Megablast	—N/a	—N/a	64%
The One	90% 70%	—N/a	—N/a
Play Time	—N/a	65% 47%	—N/a
Player One	—N/a	—N/a	70%
Power Play	74%	—N/a	63%
Raze	91%	—N/a	—N/a
ST Format	—N/a	81% 88%	—N/a
Tilt	17 / 20	16 / 20	—N/a
Video Games	—N/a	—N/a	64%
Zero	85 / 100	—N/a	93 / 100

Switchblade II received mostly positive reception since its release on the Amiga.

The One gave the Amiga version of Switchblade II an overall score of 90%, comparing it to Strider from Capcom. The One notes Switchblade II as an improvement over its predecessor, expressing that "the main sprites are larger, the levels are bigger" and praising the addition of new weapons. Competition against Switchblade II at the time of the release include the similarly critically acclaimed Gods and the less-so Turrican II, and The One expresses that Switchblade II stands out from similar titles due to its "individual merits".

== Legacy ==
Although Switchblade II received mostly positive reception in all platforms, one of the main criticisms directed towards George Allan was its slow pacing and the lack of enemies in the playfield and as such, Allan pursued in creating a significantly faster title than his previous work, which would eventually lead to the conception of the original Zool.
