= BSS Jane Seymour =

1990 video game

- Publisher(s): EU: Gremlin Graphics; NA: Gremlin / Konami
- Platform(s): Amiga, Atari ST, MS-DOS
- Release: 1990
- Genre(s): Role-playing, dungeon crawl
- Mode(s): Single-player

BSS Jane Seymour: Federation Quest 1 is a 1990 science fiction role-playing video game published by Gremlin Graphics for the Amiga, Atari ST, and MS-DOS. For the North American release and DOS release in Europe, the game was co-published by Gremlin and Konami, and renamed to Spacewrecked: 14 Billion Light Years from Earth.

== Plot ==
Federation has dispatched the player to salvage the derelict Biological Survey Ship (BSS) Jane Seymour. According to a report, the radiation from a nearby star has driven the crew insane and the ship's zoological samples have broken free.

== Gameplay ==
The combat is in real-time and aiming is done manually with a gun sight. Better guns have more accurate aiming and faster reload speed. The player can recruit robots and program them to different tasks like combat and item crafting.

== Reception ==
Reception

Review scores
Publication	Score
ACE	810/1000 (Amiga)
Computer and Video Games	91% (Amiga)
ST Format	87% (1990); 70% (1992)
The Games Machine (UK)	89% (Amiga)
Zero	89% (Amiga)
Amiga Joker	75%
.info	4/5 (Amiga)
PC Joker	70% (DOS)
Pelit	82%

Computer and Video Games called the game "an excellent adventure", with the only criticism being the "cuddly and cartoony" look of the enemies. The Games Machine compared the gameplay to Dungeon Master and the graphic style and setting to Xenomorph. The game was said to be more complicated than other games of its type and the game's difficulty was noted as very high. Zero called the game "well executed, well playable and well worth a look". ST Format compared the game to Captive and Dungeon Master, and said the game is "lively and addictive". In a 1992 re-review, ST Format gave a more negative assessment, calling the game "a fair 3D adventure hampered by an unnecessarily long-winded control system and too much loading and disk-swapping". ACE compared the controls to Ubisoft's Zombi. The game was said to be "surprisingly addictive" for a game of this style, but frustrating at times. Pelit called the game unnecessarily complicated. .info compared the game to Day of the Viper and said "the graphics are better, the play even more detailed and frantic".
