= Loaded (video game) =

1995 video game

- North American PlayStation box art
- Developer: Gremlin Interactive
- Publishers: NA: Interplay Productions; PAL: Gremlin Interactive
- Composer: Patrick Phelan
- Platforms: PlayStation, Saturn
- Release: PlayStation: NA: December 15, 1995; PAL: February 1996; Sega Saturn: PAL: July 1996; NA: October 25, 1996
- Genre: Shoot 'em up
- Modes: Single-player, multiplayer

Loaded (released as Blood Factory in Japan) is a science fiction-themed top-down multidirectional shooter developed by Gremlin Interactive. Loaded was released on December 15, 1995, on the PlayStation, and was ported to the Sega Saturn the following year. The game had origins in DC Comics as well as the more adult-orientated Vertigo Comics, and there was a small graphic novel based on the game. The six playable characters of the game are a combination of villains, anti-heroes, psychopaths, perverts, mutants, and flamboyant murderers. They are, however, the best hope to stop the intergalactic supervillain nicknamed F.U.B. and save the universe. The characters were created and designed with contributions from Garth Ennis of Vertigo Comics and Greg Staples of 2000AD.

Loaded includes macabre humor, over-the-top violence and gore, and lighting effects, but was often criticized for repetitive gameplay. The following year a sequel was released with mildly improved graphics: Re-Loaded.

== Plot ==
F.U.B. was once a catering officer with the Sector Marines. F.U.B. (which stands "Fat Ugly Boy") was once on a barren desert front during one of the relatively obscure skirmishes of the last 40 years. Not wanting to let "the boys" down and unable to find any meat, F.U.B., cooked his own legs and served them up in a rich broth. Despite it being the best dish he had ever created, F.U.B. was given an unconditional discharge and asked never to show his face again. F.U.B. replaces his legs with, hydraulic-powered replacements. He undertakes a radical appearance; wearing furry dice, smoking Havana cigars and painting a target on his portly belly.

The six playable characters have notable differences and derangements, but what they have in common is that they are all psychotic criminals who have been setup by F.U.B. and are now serving sentence on an inhospitable prison planet, the planet Raulf. F.U.B. has even taken on a new identity, working his way up the ladder by murder, and is now the warden of Raulf.

The player (or two of the game's six characters, in two player mode) must escape Raulf, chase F.U.B. and engage on a bloody odyssey across the strange worlds of the galaxy to exact revenge on F.U.B. The supervillain, however, sees it as a challenge, and to this end he creates a machine that can toy with the very fabric of the universe, manipulate matter, and even open doorways to other dimensions. With this machine, F.U.B. plans to hold the universe for ransom and sets up a prison break on Raulf to set things in motion. If he can defeat a group of the most feared individuals in the galaxy who are armed to the teeth and wanting revenge, he figures he can defeat anyone.

=== Playable Characters ===
Mamma: A very large and psychologically disturbed man with the mind of an infant. He wears a diaper, bonnet, and bunny slippers and can only say "mamma". Mamma's weapon is a plasma gun, and his bomb is the Ripple Grenade, used when Mamma creates a wave through the ground that instantly kills a large amount of foes around him. This attack can travel through walls and doors.

Fwank: Featured on the cover of the game, Fwank is a man who wears a colorfully painted bank bag over his head that makes him resemble a clown. He carries around his teddy bear and a mood-shifting balloon (Green for "Chuckly", Yellow for "I Need Space", and Red for "I Wouldn't Ask If I Were You"). Fwank's weapon of choice is a cannon that fires Neutron Spheres, and his bombs are Homing Teddies, a floating armada of teddy bears that eviscerate nearby foes. This attack can kill enemies stationed directly behind a door, but cannot travel through walls and doors. The teddies can, however, follow Fwank and stay in use longer to attack incoming enemies.

Bounca: A former bouncer turned mercenary. He is about as large as Mamma and wears an oversized metal lower jaw and a tuxedo. His weapon is a missile launcher, and his bomb is the Frag Missile, a randomly-moving burst of shrapnel. This attack cannot travel through walls and doors.

Vox: A female DJ (and only female character in the game) who uses sound and music technology to kill foes. Her weapon is the Hail Flail, and her ultra bomb is the Sonic Blast, a burst of lethal sound waves. This attack can travel through walls and doors.

Butch: A homely man who wears ladies' dresses in combat and dislikes those who find it funny. Butch's weapon is a flamethrower, and his bomb is the Explosive Ring, the release of fireballs in all directions. This attack can travel through walls and doors. It must be noted that instead of splattering enemies into a bloody heap, the flamethrower and the Explosive Ring both char enemies' bodies on contact.

Cap'n Hands: A pirate-like bounty hunter with freakishly large hands and forearms, an exposed ribcage, and a human head. His cybernetic body is old and out of date, but he chooses to keep it because he likes the sounds it makes. His weapons are a pair of flintlocks, and his bomb is the Vortex Bomb, a curtain of dark energy that shreds enemies to pieces. This attack can travel through walls and doors.

== Gameplay ==
The game features levels across fifteen different worlds and has six playable characters: Mamma, Fwank, Bounca, Vox, Butch and Cap'n Hands. Two characters may be selected in co-operative mode to complete the game. A mission briefing plays at the start of every mission, aided by a full motion video sequence. Loaded's gameplay is almost identical to that of Gauntlet, which requires the player to move room to room killing everything in sight, everything of which will try to kill the player also. Score can be increased by looting the bloodied remains of enemies. There are some puzzle and exploration elements, and power-ups and ammo can be found. The levels progress by collecting keycards capable of unlocking doors. The player can zoom in to their character by pressing R2, or zoom out by pressing L2. At the end of each level, the game tallies the player's greed factor, accuracy and body count on a 0–100% scale in order to give the player's career prospects (ranging from as low as "social worker" to as high as "genocidal maniac", etc.) and final score.

== Development and marketing ==
Loaded was developed by Gremlin Interactive, a British software house based in Sheffield which had previously had a successful run in developing games. Loaded and its sequel Re-Loaded would be among the last games developed by Gremlin Interactive, before it was acquired by French giant Infogrames for £24 million, and the studio in Sheffield closed. Development took place over less than a year. The game was published in North America by US-based Interplay.

A demo of Loaded was included on a demo disc bundled with the PlayStation in Europe.

The main character design and graphics were done by a host of comic book illustrators like Les Spink and Greg Staples (of 2000AD fame). Interplay collaborated with DC Comics to create a 12-page novella illustrated with the game's artwork to promote it and introduce the characters and the game premise. The book was published bundled with DC's works at the time and DC signed adult-orientated Vertigo Comics star Garth Ennis to write it. The novella is now considered a collector's item.

The game was released for the Sega Saturn over a year after the PlayStation version appeared. Asked to explain this delay, Interplay producer Jeremy Airey stated, "A year ago, we were worried if the Saturn was even going to do well. As of late, [Saturn sales] have picked up. Also, when we started doing Loaded [for the] Saturn, it looked horrible. With the new Sega libraries, Loaded looks and plays good."

=== Soundtrack ===
Loaded features 21 compositions by Neil Biggin, plus 2 tracks by Patrick (Pat) Phelan and 2 more by Pop Will Eat Itself (Kick to Kill and RSVP). The game was specially designed so that it could be placed inside a CD player and used as an audio CD (skipping Track 1 which contained the code for the game). This would then enable the listener to play the full soundtrack - including many hidden tracks and two of which were complete tracks from the Amiga CD32 version of Zool 2 (Mount Ices and Mental Block's house), another game by Gremlin. There are 25 audio tracks in total on the CD, the hidden tracks were brief demos and were never used in-game.

== Reception ==
Reception

Review scores
Publication	Score
Electronic Gaming Monthly	8.25/10 (PS1); 5.88/10 (SAT)
Famitsu	5/10, 6/10, 6/10, 7/10 (SAT)
GameSpot	6.6/10 (SAT)
Next Generation	4/5 (PS1); 3/5 (SAT)
Maximum	3/5 (PS1)
Sega Saturn Magazine	84% (SAT)

The original release for PlayStation met with mostly positive reviews. The four reviewers of Electronic Gaming Monthly compared it favorably to Smash TV and cited the multiplayer mode as the game's most enjoyable feature. Major Mike of GamePro deemed it "a simple premise taken to absurd heights: From the wacky characters to the overblown carnage, the game is generally a blast to play. While it lacks some of the strategy of similar-minded titles like Doom, the action hardly ever lets up." He also extensively praised the graphics, particularly noting the strong details, zoom feature, and light sourcing effects. While they complimented the animated environments and four-player option, Maximum had an overall subdued reaction to the game, saying it is much more repetitive than similar games such as Alien Breed and The Chaos Engine. A reviewer for Next Generation also commented on the repetitiveness, saying that the 15 levels look different but all play the same. However, the review was generally complimentary, commenting on the "blistering pace" of the gameplay, smooth and detailed graphics, light-sourcing effects, and soundtrack which "is among the best we've heard in years".

Most critics commented that the Saturn version successfully replicated the graphical effects and other technical aspects of the PlayStation version, with a notable exception in Tommy Glide of GamePro, who said the graphics are not as smooth and do not zoom as easily. However, Next Generation and Dan Hsu and Crispin Boyer of Electronic Gaming Monthly said that Loaded was not as good as it seemed in the wake of its original release on the PlayStation, and that the game's graphics, soundtrack, and shock value were not enough to keep the mindless gameplay from quickly becoming boring. In a reassessment roughly a year after the PlayStation version's release, Next Generation lowered its score to three out of five stars (the same as the Saturn version). Hugh Sterbakov of GameSpot and Rad Automatic of Sega Saturn Magazine agreed that the game is mindless and repetitive, but held that in the field of simplistic shooters it is a success.

Electronic Gaming Monthly editors named the Saturn version a runner-up for Best Music of 1996 (behind Wipeout XL).

Loaded was a commercial success, with the PlayStation version shipping 250,000 copies the week of its release. In the USA alone, the PlayStation version sold over 140,000 copies.

== Legacy ==
Less than a year after the original game was released, a sequel was released also for the PlayStation and MS-DOS entitled Re-Loaded, developed and published by the same companies.
