= Bounder (video game) =

- C64 Cover art
- Developer: Gremlin Graphics
- Publisher: Gremlin Graphics
- Designers: Robert Toone; Christian P. Shrigley; Andrew Green
- Platforms: Amstrad CPC, Amstrad PCW, ZX Spectrum, MSX, Commodore 64, Commodore 16, Plus/4
- Release: 1985; 1986 (ZX Spectrum)
- Genre: Action
- Mode: Single-player

Bounder is a 1985 action game published by Gremlin Graphics in which the player navigates a variety of courses as a bouncing tennis ball.

== Gameplay ==
Courses are composed of numerous tiles, which are suspended high above ground. The ball must be bounced past walls and over enemies; coming into contact with either, or plummeting over the edge of the course, results in the loss of one of the player's seven lives. Courses feature power squares, which push the tennis ball forward and allow longer jumps. These must be utilized to complete the course. Power squares are also used to enable the tennis ball to reach mystery spaces, tiles with question marks, which contain extra lives and bonus jumps which are used on bonus screens. Mystery spaces can also destroy the tennis ball, resulting in the loss of a life, through instant destruction or by freezing the ball in place while a missile flies across the play area and explodes.

The bonus screen is accessed every time a course is completed, it consists of mystery spaces which increase the player's score when bounced on for the player to receive. 40 bounces are allowed on each bonus screen, though this figure can be increased by the player uncovering more from mystery squares during the preceding course. Once all bounces are used or all of the mystery spaces are bounced on, play moves to the next course. Bouncing on all mystery spaces awards the player 10,000 points as well as an extra life.

== Reception ==
Reception

Review scores
Publication	Score
Your Sinclair	9/10
Zzap!64	97%

Awards
Publication	Award
Crash	Crash Smash
Your Sinclair	Megagame
Amstrad Action	Mastergame

Bounder received a Gold Medal Award from Commodore 64 magazine Zzap!64 as well as a Your Sinclair Mega Game award.
