= Zool =

1992 video game

Zool: Ninja of the Nth Dimension
- Amiga cover art
- Developer: Gremlin Graphics
- Publisher: Gremlin Graphics
- Designer: George Allan
- Composers: Patrick Phelan; Neil Biggin (CD32)
- Platforms: Amiga, Acorn Archimedes, Atari ST, Amiga CD32, MS-DOS, Game Boy, Game Gear, Master System, Genesis, Super NES
- Release: October 1992: Amiga; March 1993: MS-DOS
- Genre: Platform
- Mode: Single-player

Zool: Ninja of the Nth Dimension is a platform video game developed and published by Gremlin Graphics. It was marketed as a rival to Sega's Sonic the Hedgehog. Originally released for the Amiga home computer in October 1992, the game was subsequently ported to Sega Genesis, Super Nintendo Entertainment System, Master System, Game Boy and Game Gear, as well as other home computers. A sequel, Zool 2, was released in 1993. A remastered version of the original game, titled Zool Redimensioned, was developed by Sumo Digital Academy and published by Secret Mode for Windows and PlayStation 4 in August 2021.

== Gameplay ==
Super NES gameplay

The game is a platform game, relying on smooth, fast-moving gameplay. Its protagonist is Zool, a gremlin "Ninja of the Nth Dimension" who is forced to land on Earth; in order to gain ninja ranking, he has to pass seven lands, beating a boss at the end of each of them. The game contains a number of embedded minigames, including several arcade games, a scrolling space shooter and a game accessible only by making Zool play a certain tune on an in-game piano or finding certain invisible warp points.

== Development and release ==
George Allan came up with the idea of Zool as he was criticized that his previous game Switchblade II had a lack of enemies. In development, Zool could cast spells to get him out of trouble by collecting potions. For example, Zool could escape from pits with high jump spells and cast a shadow spell to make a clone of him that follows his actions (thus doubling the fire power). In the final version, the spells were replaced with collectible power-ups. The very early name for the project was Pootz. The soundtrack by Patrick Phelan overlaps with the Lotus 3 soundtrack and inspired several modern electro/techno remixes. Candy company Chupa Chups sponsored the game's production, with the company logo featured prominently within the game. The game was heavily hyped upon its initial release, including being bundled with the then-newly launched Amiga 1200, although not the AGA version with enhanced graphics which followed later. In 2000, the Amiga version of Zool was re-released as part of The Best of Gremlin compilation.

Zool was also ported to the Atari ST, Game Boy, Mega Drive/Genesis, SNES, Master System, Game Gear, Amiga CD32, IBM PC Compatibles, and RISC OS; a Zool arcade machine was also released. The Amiga CD32 version has original red book audio tracks by Neil Biggin and has the option to have both sound effects and music. This and the Acorn Archimedes port are the only two incarnations of the original Amiga version to have this. For the Atari ST, the programmers and graphics artists choose to incorporate the redesigned sprites from their upcoming sequel Zool 2 (in development at the time) to use for their star character on the Atari version to address the criticism that the original Zool character sprites were not cute enough. Most computer ports are close to the Amiga original but the Genesis and SNES ports both feature different levels which are structured differently, different background graphics, and unique bosses. The Sega Master System version features smaller, more scaled down stages and a more strict quota on collectible items, but also features unique gameplay moves like a wall climb. With the exception of the CD32 version, all console versions feature the soundtrack of the Amiga original, remixed appropriately for each console's unique sound systems.

== Reception ==
Reception

Review scores
Publication	Score	
Publication	Game Boy	Sega Genesis
Electronic Gaming Monthly		5.8/10 (Note: In Electronic Gaming Monthly's review of the Genesis, version, two critics scored it 5/10, two 6/10, one 7/10.)
GameZone	57/100	
Power Unlimited	80%	81%

The original Amiga game was released to critical acclaim, receiving scores of 97%, 96%, 95% from Amiga Computing, Amiga Action and Amiga Format respectively. Electronic Gaming Monthly claimed that Zool sports great graphics, but the character moves too fast with little control. GamePro gave a positive review of the Game Gear version, praising its "great graphics and sound abound", as well as its "crisp" gameplay. Power Unlimited gave the Game Boy version a score of 80% and the Sega Genesis version a score of 81%. The magazine was generally positive to the game, despite noting that the game did not add anything new in the platforming genre.

Retrospectively, Virgin Media included Zool on their list of top ten video game ninja heroes. In 2011, Wirtualna Polska ranked it as the 22nd best game for the Amiga, noting its "absurdly" high difficulty.

== Legacy ==
Two children's novels based on the games, entitled Cool Zool and Zool Rules, were released in February 1995. They were written by Stan Nicholls and Ian Edginton and published by Boxtree. The Game Maker's Companion (APress, 2010), a book on hobbyist game development, contains step-by-step instructions on how to remake the original Zool game using GameMaker Studio.

A remastered version of the console version of Zool, titled Zool Redimensioned, was developed by Sumo Digital Academy and published by publisher Secret Mode for Windows and PlayStation 4 on August 18, 2021. The remaster features modes for both modern and classic-style difficulty, challenges for each level, and a multiplayer party mode, as well as an emulated version of the Genesis version of the game. For legal reasons, references to the original game's Chupa Chups sponsorship have been removed.
