= Siren City =

1983 video game

- European cover art
- Developer(s): Ian Gray
- Publisher(s): EU: Interceptor Micros; NA: Interceptor Micros
- Designer(s): Ian Gray
- Platform(s): Commodore 64
- Release: EU: 1983; NA: 1983
- Genre(s): Action
- Mode(s): Single-player

Siren City is a game for the Commodore 64 which involves the player taking the role of an American "Cop Car" patrolling the streets of dangerous Siren City. Grand Theft Auto developer Steve Hammond discusses Siren City as inspiration for Grand Theft Auto as a "top-down car game with cops".

In the game, Siren City is one of the roughest towns in America. Starting as a rookie driving through a maze of Skyscrapers and seemingly peaceful streets, the player's job is to keep law & order, however the player encounters many of the toughest criminals in the city. These include Public Enemy No. 1: Slit-Throat Steve, Public Enemy No. 7: Dune Buggy Jon and Dr J. Davies Ph.D, V.E.A.S.

== Gameplay ==
The game action is displayed via an aerial view of the city centered on the player's "Cop Car". The player undertakes a number of missions, ending after either a set objective achieved or a fixed time duration. These missions include:

- Patrolling the city
- Chasing down criminals in dragsters
- Neutralizing a cloud of chemical smog
- Evading aggressive pursuit by a rogue armed helicopter

The game is distinguished by a large and detailed city map, including high-rise, difficult-to-navigate suburbs and a working railway line.
