= Empire of Karn =

1985 video game

- Developer: Interceptor Software
- Publisher: Interceptor Software
- Designer: Ian Gray
- Platform: Commodore 64
- Release: EU: 1985
- Genre: Adventure
- Mode: Single-player

Empire of Karn is an adventure game released for the Commodore 64 in 1985 by Interceptor Software. It's a sequel to The Heroes Of Karn from 1983. It was written by Ian Gray with music and graphics by Chris Cox.
