= Fungus (video game) =

1986 video game

- Developer(s): Karl Hörnell
- Publisher(s): Interceptor Micros
- Platform(s): Commodore 64
- Release: 1986
- Genre(s): Auto-runner
- Mode(s): Single-player

Fungus is an auto-runner developed by Karl Hörnell and published by Interceptor Micros. It was released in 1986 for Commodore 64. The game revolves around a humanoid alien who is addicted to eating space mushrooms, and runs across other space islands to collect them while dodging hostile aliens who are trying to protect their island. The player can jump over gaps and move to the foreground or background of the screen to dodge things. Fungus is notable for being developed when Hörnell was still in high school, during which time he learned machine code to create his own Commodore 64 games, also handling the artwork himself. It was positively received by critics, who cited its graphics as impressive, and praised its gameplay, considering it above-average for a budget title.

== Development ==
The game was developed while Hörnell was a student. Hörnell cited the theming around mushrooms because he "always found [them] to be kind of cool". He implemented the isometric perspective because he found it more visually advanced than typical sidescrollers. The founders of Interceptor Micros found the game so impressive that they invited Hörnell and his family to England, where he could finish the game. He described the meeting as awkward because they were "so far above [him] in every way" that he could not think of anything interesting to say.

== Reception ==
Zzap!64 magazine rated the game highly, describing it as a "jolly good buy". While one of the viewers described it as "rather frustrating to play at first", he soon found it "compulsive" and "addictive", summing it up as a "pleasant game in every way". Laurie Simpson of Commodore User magazine also gave the game a high rating, calling it "light-hearted" with a "professional polish". However, ASM magazine rated the game lower, still praising its graphics but particularly criticizing its gameplay. Retrospectively, Retro Gamer magazine called the game the "great-grandaddy" of the endless runner game Temple Run.

== Legacy ==
Hörnell spent subsequent years developing Fungus 2, an improved sequel in every respect, which he considered his magnum opus. The game was nearly complete in 1990, but Interceptor Micros refused to publish it, considering Commodore 64-only games outdated. The damaged state of Hörnell's Commodore 64 caused him to cancel the game, as he could not afford a replacement. Many years later in 2021, the game was unofficially published by Frank Gasking and released online.
