= Litil Divil =

1993 video game

- CD32 cover art
- Developer: Gremlin Graphics
- Publishers: Gremlin Graphics; Philips Interactive Media (US); Rushware (Germany); M.C.M. Software (Spain); MicroByte (Argentina)
- Platforms: CD32, MS-DOS, CD-i, Windows, OS X, Linux
- Release: CD-I: WW: 1993; MS-DOS: WW: 1993; CD32: WW: August 1994; Windows: WW: 11 May 2011; OS X: WW: 9 May 2013; Linux: WW: 24 July 2014
- Genre: Action
- Mode: Single-player

Litil Divil is a video game developed and published by Gremlin Graphics Software for the Phillips CD-I and MS-DOS in 1993 and for Amiga CD32 in 1994. Player's play as Mutt, a dog-like devil in the Underworld whose goal is to obtain the "Mystical Pizza of Plenty" from the Labyrinth of Chaos.

Litil Divil's release was delayed several times, and the game was initially advertised in magazines under the name Little Divil.

The game had relatively positive reception, with common praises going towards the games graphics, sound and humorous art style and tone but criticisms towards certain portions of gameplay feeling like a form of padding.

== Gameplay ==
The player takes control of a little red devil called Mutt who is trying to retrieve the "Mystical Pizza of Plenty" from the Labyrinth of Chaos. The dungeon consists of a maze navigated from an over-the-shoulder perspective and rooms where Mutt is facing various riddles.

== Development ==
Litil Divil first began development in July 1990, with the Amiga CD32 version releasing after four years in development in August 1994; Litil Divil's release was delayed several times. However, the original art design behind Litil Divil is stated to have happened five years before release. Litil Divil's demo was initially created by Emerald Software, and was being developed concurrently with Plan 9 From Outer Space in 1992 by Gremlin Sheffield, and was named "Little Divil" at the time. Litil Divil was first released for PC on CD, and a later floppy release on PC required frames to be removed from animation and the quality of the music to be lowered due to compression. The One interviewed Tommy Rolfe, one of Litil Divil's programmers, for information regarding its development in a pre-release interview. Litil Divil was programmed by Gremlin Ireland, but work on the game was originally begun by Gremlin Sheffield, which Rolfe said it began five years ago, producing some artwork, sketches and things before it passed to them. One of the original designers for Litil Divil was Heimdall 2 artist Jerr O'Carroll, prior to his departure from Gremlin and subsequent employment with Core Design in 1991. O'Carroll's artstyle is present in Mutt's design.

Originally there were five different Mutts who were "competing with each other to get through five levels of Hell"; the development team decided that it would be better to concentrate on one character, and Hell was later changed to Underworld. The plot device of The Mystic Pizza of Plenty was introduced late into development. Steve McKevitt from Litil Divil's publisher Gremlin Graphics named the game, Litil Divil was chosen as opposed to 'Little Devil' because McKevitt's wife has an Irish accent, and "she and her family always say "Ooh, you litil divil" to the kids, when they're naughty".

Litil Divil was originally intended for release for the Super Famicom CD drive "in 1990 or 1991", but due to the CD drive's cancelled release, Rolfe states that "while we were waiting around, we thought it might be a good idea to start converting it to the PC CD-ROM. After a year or so we realized that we'd probably never see the Super Famicom CD, so we just went full steam ahead with the PC version". The Amiga CD32 port was impeded by the Amiga's lower RAM; Rolfe states that "we developed Litil Divil originally for a PC with a minimum of 4Mb RAM. So you can see 2Mb isn't really that much when you're creating a graphics-intensive program like Litil Divil ... We recently converted Litil Divil for the [CD-i], which has 2.5Mb RAM, so we had already compacted the data down to that level - and for the CD32 we just had to go a little bit further".

== Release ==
A reworked Sega Mega Drive conversion was planned but never released. Likewise, a port for the Atari Jaguar CD was in development by Gremlin Interactive and slated to be published around the second quarter of 1995, but was never released.

== Reception ==
Reception

Review scores
Publication	Score
Next Generation	1/5
PC Gamer (US)	86%
CD-i	84% (CDI)

Computer Gaming World in March 1994 called Litil Divil "a delightful graphic adventure", predicting that the game "should cause quite a stir ... stuffed full of game play and long term enjoyment". The magazine predicted that a sequel and imitations would appear. The four reviewers of Electronic Gaming Monthly had a moderately positive reaction to the CD-i version, praising the multifaceted gameplay, the graphics, the sound, and the cute, humorous personality of the player character, but criticizing the lagging controls. They awarded it a score of 6.5 out of 10.

Next Generation reviewed the CD-i version of the game and gave one star out of five, commenting that the various levels fail to offer anything more than a stimulus-response style of play that will have most players (even children) disinterested inside of a few minutes.

The One gave the Amiga version of Litil Divil an overall score of 74%, criticizing the fact that the player cannot save the game at will, instead requiring finishing a level or discovering a save room, as well as the tunnel sections of the game, calling them "tedious", and furthermore a source of "over-riding boredom". The One praised the art style and comical sound effects, and enjoyed the puzzle-solving and arcade sections of the game, but found the lengthy tunnel sections to be filler, remarking that without them the game would be more fun, calling Litil Divil a "missed opportunity".

== Re-release ==
Funbox Media re-released the game in DotEmu (PC), Good Old Games (PC) and GamersGate (PC, Mac) on May 11, 2011, June 21, 2011, and March 19, 2014, respectively. OS X and Linux versions were added in GOG.com by Blue Moon Red Owl, the current distributor of the game on GOG.com, on May 9, 2013 and July 24, 2014. Kiss, Ltd. re-released the game on Steam on March 19, 2014 for PC only and Desura for PC, Mac and Linux.
