= Retribution (video game) =

1994 video game

- Developer: Astros Productions
- Publishers: EU: Gremlin Interactive; NA: Front Line Publishing
- Platform: DOS
- Release: EU: November 1994; NA: 1995
- Genres: First-person shooter, vehicle simulation
- Mode: Single-player

Retribution is a video game developed by British studio Astros Productions and published by Gremlin Interactive for DOS.

== Gameplay ==
Retribution is a game in which the player participates in missions on land and in the air using various vehicles.

== Development and release ==
Retribution was the first project attached to British game studio Gremlin Interactive after it changed its name from Gremlin Graphics and began focusing on PC games. Development began in early 1993. Gremlin partnered with Astros Productions, consisting of brothers Pete and George Karboulonis, who had previously programmed the PC conversions of Toyota Celica GT Rally and Nigel Mansell's World Championship Racing. As such, Retribution was pitched as a racing game and Astros was given three months to flesh out the idea. The pair finished the prototype in only six weeks. Gremlin found their landscaping routine (known as Voxel Spacing) so impressive that the racing concept evolved into futuristic combat with added aerial missions to better accentuate the technology. Eight months were spent on its 3D engine alone and an additional four months to finish the game.

Gremlin's Paul Green conceived the plot and wrote its script. Proclaiming the synopsis to be completely original, Green stated, “I’ve not borrowed the ideas from anywhere else — I can’t remember seeing a film or reading a book with anything like this in it.” Composer Glyn R. Brown was allegedly brought in for a potential full-time position on Retribution when Gremlin's in-house musician Patrick Phelan was promoted to software manager. However, Brown suggested that Phelan was dissatisfied with his new role and subsequently returned to the music department. The Retribution soundtrack was ultimately created by Chris Adams. Traditionally a film composer, this was the first video game on which he worked. Adams was given storyboards for the animated introduction and cutscenes to aid him as he began writing the score while they were still being rendered.

Gremlin released Retribution in Europe in November 1994. Front Street Publishing, an arm of the UK publisher U.S. Gold, partnered with Gremlin to distribute the latter's games in North America in 1995. Front Street began offering demo disks of Retribution and other titles in the region early that year.

== Reception ==
Reception

Review scores
Publication	Score
Computer Game Review	78/100
Computer Gaming World	2/5
Hyper	67/100
Joystick	124/200
Next Generation	2/5
PC Zone	45/100
PC Games (DE)	68%
PC Games (UK)	80%
PC Joker	69%
PC Player	47/100
Pelit	63/100
Play Time	70%
Power Play	65%
Score	38%
Secret Service	80%

Retribution received mixed reviews. Next Generation reviewed the game, rating it two stars out of five, and stated that "Mediocre graphics and a generally weak set of sound effects don't do much to generate excitement for what, in the end, is a yawner of a game."
