= Zool 2 =

1993 video game

- Developers: The Warp Factory; Gremlin Graphics (MS-DOS); Imagitec Design (Jaguar)
- Publishers: Gremlin Graphics: Jaguar; NA/EU: Atari Corporation; JP: Mumin Corporation BlackBerry; WW: Amiga, Inc.
- Producer: Peter J. Cook
- Designer: Ed Campbell
- Programmer: Andy Findlay
- Writer: Steven McKevitt
- Composers: Neil Biggin; Patrick Phelan
- Series: Zool
- Platforms: Amiga, CD32, Jaguar, BlackBerry, MS-DOS
- Release: November 1993: Amiga; EU: November 1993 CD32; EU: 1994 MS-DOS; EU: 1994 Jaguar; NA/EU: 9 December 1994; JP: 21 April 1995 BlackBerry; WW: 30 April 2013
- Genre: Platform
- Modes: Single-player, multiplayer

Zool 2 is a side-scrolling platform video game originally developed by The Warp Factory and published by Gremlin Graphics for the Amiga in November 1993. It is the sequel to the original Zool, which was released earlier in 1992.

When the forces of Krool are wreaking havoc upon the Nth Dimension with the help from his henchman Mental Block, the intergalactic gremlin ninja Zool alongside his female companion Zooz and their two-headed dog Zoon, are entrusted with the task of stopping Mental Block and restore order to the dimension. Originally released for the Amiga microcomputers, Zool 2 was later ported to the Amiga CD32, MS-DOS, and Jaguar, with the latter being published by Atari Corporation in North America and Europe, in addition to being published in Japan as Zool 2 (ズール2) by Mumin Corporation on April 21, 1995.

Zool 2 for the Amiga received positive reception from critics who praised the graphics, sound department and gameplay, with some considering it as an improvement over the first game. Other ports of the game received similarly positive reception from reviewers, while the Jaguar version received mixed reviews from critics since its release and has sold nearly 11,000 copies as of April 1, 1995, though it is unknown how many were sold in total during its lifetime.

== Gameplay ==
Amiga screenshot

Zool 2 is a side-scrolling platform game that plays similarly to its predecessor, Zool. Both Zool and his female counterpart, Zooz, almost share the same move set between each other but there are some subtle differences with the two characters in terms of their abilities and means of defense. Whereas Zool attacks with projectiles, Zooz is armed with an energy whip for close quarters combat, along with the ability of shooting projectiles as well. In addition, each character is capable of destroying certain parts of the scenery that the other one could not, and vice versa, resulting in a slightly different route through the levels. As with the original game, the sequel features several minigames, such as a version of Breakout which involves using Zoon, the two-headed morphing pet dog of Zool and Zooz, as a paddle in order to keep the ball in play by bouncing it upwards. The progression system acts similarly to the original game, which involves the player in collecting a set number of items in order to advance into the next level. The game also features a two-player mode.

== Plot ==
Zool 2 takes place several months after the events occurred in Zool. Krool, the main antagonist of the original game, has sent his forces and Mental Block, his shapeshifting henchman to invade the Nth dimension and seize power in order to stifle the imagination of the world, causing rampant boredom in the process. Zool, the main protagonist of the first game, alongside his companion Zooz and their two-headed mascot Zoon, are entrusted with the mission of restoring order to the dimension and defeat Mental Block. After traversing through multiple locations, the trio reaches the main area where Mental Block resides and they defeat him, saving the dimension as a result, with a hint at a possible further sequel.

== Development ==
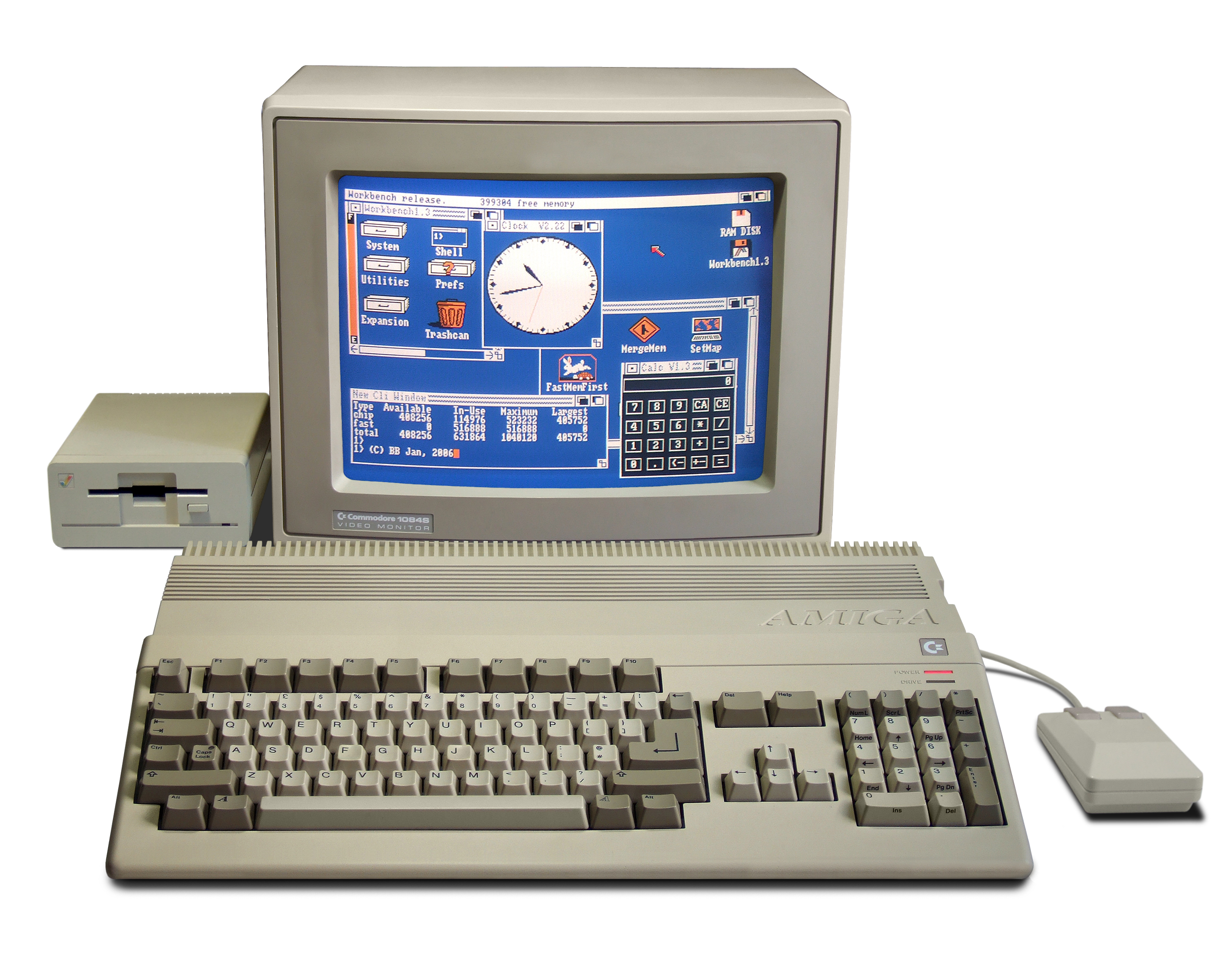
Zool 2 on the Amiga was conceived by a new team that previously worked on Harlequin for Gremlin Graphics.

Zool 2 was created by a new development team at The Warp Factory, whose programming staff involved personnel that previously worked on Harlequin for Gremlin Graphics, with only composer Patrick Phelan returning from the original Zool crew as George Allan, Adrian Carless and Tony Dawson did not return to work on the sequel. Gremlin marketing manager Nick Clarkson stated that they wanted to expand upon Zool's character and gameplay for the sequel, while producer Peter J. Cook claimed that the team at The Warp Factory wanted to stay with a basic theme following the same gameplay style but move towards a new direction via new ideas with larger levels to explore. The team also reworked Zool's look for the sequel, while his female companion Zooz went through various changes before release.

== Release ==
The Amiga remained the lead format for the second Zool game, but unlike the first it was not widely ported to the other platforms, only the Atari Jaguar and MS-DOS. The game had originally been planned to be bundled with the CD32 at the request of Commodore, but when Gremlin Graphics failed to reach the deadline, Zool 2 was bundled with the Amiga 1200's Computer Combat pack in 1994. It was also re-released as part of the Windows-based compilation CD Best of Gremlin in 2000. The Jaguar version of Zool 2 was developed by Imagitec Design and was first showcased to the public at SCES '94 in a playable state.

== Reception ==
Reception

Aggregate score
Aggregator	Score			
Aggregator	Amiga	Atari Jaguar	CD32	DOS
GameRankings	N/A	65%	N/A	N/A

Review scores
Publication	Score			
Publication	Amiga	Atari Jaguar	CD32	DOS
AllGame	N/A	2/5	N/A	2.5/5
Electronic Gaming Monthly	N/A	33 / 50	N/A	N/A
GameFan	N/A	243 / 300	N/A	N/A
GamePro	N/A	17.5 / 20	N/A	N/A
Next Generation	N/A	3/5	N/A	N/A
Aktueller Software Markt	10 / 12 (A1200) 10 / 12	N/A	11 / 12	N/A
Amiga Action	79%	N/A	82%	N/A
Amiga Computing	90%	N/A	N/A	N/A
Amiga Concept	N/A	N/A	73%	N/A
Amiga Down Under	85%	N/A	N/A	N/A
Amiga Dream	90% (A1200) 85%	N/A	N/A	N/A
Amiga Force	86 / 100	N/A	N/A	N/A
Amiga Format	93% (A1200) 9 / 10	N/A	87%	N/A
Amiga Games	76% (A1200) 80%	N/A	80%	N/A
Amiga Joker	80% (A1200) 77%	N/A	85%	N/A
Amiga Power	86% (A1200) 87%	N/A	87%	N/A
AUI	90%	N/A	92 / 100	N/A
ACAR	75%	N/A	N/A	N/A
Atari Gaming Headquarters	N/A	7 / 10	N/A	N/A
CU Amiga	76%	N/A	N/A	N/A
Consoles +	N/A	84%	N/A	N/A
Game Players	N/A	78%	N/A	N/A
Game Zero Magazine	N/A	73.0 / 100	N/A	N/A
Génération 4	85% (A1200) 84%	N/A	N/A	N/A
Jaguar	N/A	55%	N/A	N/A
Joystick	89% (A1200) 60%	N/A	N/A	N/A
MAN!AC	N/A	55%	N/A	N/A
Megablast	N/A	N/A	85%	N/A
Mega Fun	N/A	65%	N/A	N/A
Micromanía	N/A	76%	N/A	88% 85%
The One for Amiga Games	90% (A1200) 63%	N/A	90%	N/A
PC Joker	N/A	N/A	N/A	85%
PC Player	N/A	N/A	N/A	69 / 100
Player One	N/A	60%	N/A	N/A
Play Time	79 / 100 (A1200) 80%	65%	83%	67 / 100
Power Play	70% (A1200) 70%	N/A	N/A	N/A
Score	N/A	N/A	N/A	79%
ST-Computer	N/A	60%	N/A	N/A
Tilt	82%	N/A	N/A	N/A
Video Games	N/A	71%	71%	N/A
VideoGames	N/A	6 / 10	N/A	N/A

The Amiga versions of Zool 2 received generally high review scores, including 93% in Amiga Format, 90% in Amiga Computing, 86% in Amiga Power and 76% in CU Amiga.

GamePro gave the Jaguar version a positive review, saying that the varied abilities of the playable characters "push this game to the top of the Jaguar hop-n-bop ranks". GamePro also praised the graphics, stating that "Zool's Nth Dimension is a shiny, inventive world that's equal parts candy shop and toy store", and that the Jaguar version is sharper and brighter than previous versions of the game. Next Generation called it "still a basic platform game, but one of the best we've seen a while". Like GamePro, they praised the quality of the graphics, and additionally the large number of interesting power-ups and stages. Mike Weigand of Electronic Gaming Monthly assessed it as "a pretty good version of the pint-sized ninja character", particularly noting the large levels, though he felt the graphics were sometimes "visual overkill".
