= Utopia: The Creation of a Nation =

1991 video game

- European computer cover art
- Developer: Celestial Software
- Publisher: Gremlin Interactive: NA: Jaleco (SNES)
- Designers: Graeme Ing; Robert Crack
- Programmer: Graeme Ing
- Artist: Berni Hill
- Composer: Barry Leitch
- Platforms: Amiga, Atari ST, MS-DOS, Super NES
- Release: 1991: NA: September 1993 (SNES); EU: 1994 (SNES)
- Genres: Real-time strategy City-building game
- Mode: Single-player

Utopia: The Creation of a Nation is a strategy video game developed by Celestial Software and published by Gremlin Graphics (later known as Gremlin Interactive) in 1991 for the Amiga, Atari ST and MS-DOS. It was later released for the Super NES in 1993, by Jaleco in the USA. This release made use of the Super NES Mouse peripheral.

== Gameplay ==
Screenshot from the Amiga version

Screenshot from the SNES version

The game, taking place in the future, on a new planet, is open-ended where the player character is a planetary governor who evacuated his colony after it was hit by a biological weapon by an alien race. Instead of being reprimanded or fired, the governor is lauded for his care of colonists' lives over material gain, and promoted to a series of pioneer worlds to colonize.

The objective of the game is to colonize the new planet, manage the colony and raise the quality of life for the citizen in order to reach utopia.

Initially the player has a few colonists with a lot to do. The player must build everything from scratch. Building takes time and free colonists, in addition to money. Buildings under construction are depicted by scaffold.

Certain buildings require personnel (hospitals, labs, mines, factories, shipyards ...) and therefore the player has to engage in population management. The player must also micromanage features such as tax rate, birth rate and trade.

In addition, each world also has a competing alien race which is trying to colonize the same planet. There is no option to form alliances, which means that the player's population must come into conflict with the aliens. The player never actually gets to see the alien city, as it is located outside the playable map, but must instead rely on espionage to find out what the aliens and their city look like. It is possible to completely eradicate the alien race, after which the game loses its combat aspect and becomes a pure management simulation.

=== Scenarios ===
Utopia includes ten scenarios, all with a different planet and a different alien race. The scenarios are named according to the alien races in the Amiga version and according to the planets in the SNES port:

- Eldorians (Rhendor IV)
- Vroarscans (Alpha Ceti)
- Soomanii (Vega III)
- Kal-Kriken (Astoria II)
- Catalytes (Benezar IV)
- Squiz-Quijy (Antares III)
- Pascalenes (Rukbat III)
- Tilikanthua (Betazan II)
- Vanacancia (Merak VI)
- Lucratians (Gamma Lucra)

A data disk called Utopia: The New Worlds was later released by Gremlin. This disk required the original Utopia and could not be played as a stand-alone game. It included the following scenarios:

- Foralbo
- Parillatians
- Chevanno
- Old-Worlders
- Sarturians
- Sal-Kadeem
- Rako-Gorda
- Key-Guardians
- Darjakr'Ul
- Temarkians

The "Old-Worlders" were said to be humans, coming from Earth's earlier attempt to colonize the same planet. In practice, they were handled just as another hostile alien race. The terrain of the Sal-Kadeem planet was unique in that it was mostly covered with silver-colored oil that was impossible to build on. Buildings were restricted to tiny patches of habitable land.

== Development ==
The Amiga version of Utopia began development in September 1990, and was released in September 1991. British gaming magazine The One interviewed Graeme Ing and Robert Crack, the designers of Utopia, for information regarding its development in a pre-release interview. Work on Utopia began after the completion of Spacewrecked: 14 Billion Light Years From Earth, and was inspired by Sim City. According to Ing, Utopia was conceived around the idea of how Sim City could be improved upon. The main differentiating design choice was to have a 'more involved' social model, rather than center Utopia's gameplay around the city-building aspect. Ing notes Utopia's hybridized mode of gameplay, noting Utopia's combat, and greater involvement in the development of technology that the player can use, but expresses that he "[doesn't] think the actual simulation is as deep as Sim City ... All sorts of interesting factors were incorporated there. Instead, we've gone for the fun aspect". The option to automate trading was added due to Ing and Crack's belief that Utopia's trading and resource management aspect 'won't appeal to everybody'.

Utopia's alien environments were partially inspired by science fiction novels. Each alien race has differing AI routines, but the level of detail put into their development was limited by memory restrictions, with Ing expressing that "it's a trade-off really. You can't go completely overboard because the more intelligence you put in, the slower the gameplay. You've got to balance the two". A user-friendly UI was an important aspect in Utopia's development, and Ing expresses that "nothing annoys me more than a product which is graphically good but in which it's difficult for the player to grasp the controls. That's why from the word go I'm always thinking about making everything as easy as possible to use". Utopia's graphics were created in DPaint. Expansion disks for Utopia were being considered by Gremlin prior to Utopia's release, due to the project 'seeming promising'.

Ing states that he holds a design philosophy of making lists to organize a game's design prior to its development, stating that "first we generated a massive spec. It's about 100 pages long and details absolutely everything that needs to be done. Then what I always do is make a list of every single piece of code that needs to be written to make that spec. possible and work my way slowly though the list. Eventually it gets shorter". A fully functional map screen was prioritized as the first part of Utopia to be programmed, and Ing states that "we created some temporary graphics for the buildings and then I worked on all the routines necessary to scroll around the world and select those buildings". At this stage in development, Utopia lacked an isometric perspective, and the map screen was instead in 2D graphics. Ing expresses in regards to this design change that "halfway through what was going to be a 2D sim we decided it would look a lot better with an extra dimension". Ing expresses that the transition from 2D to 3D midway through development was a complication, stating that "there were a lot of problems when we switched to 2D to 3D. For example, the game involves a lot of ground vehicles moving behind and around the buildings and that took ages to work out". A map editor was designed for Utopia during development to 'simplify' map design, and Ing expresses that "basically, all it is is a modified version of the game itself with the gameplay taken out and all the facilities to help us construct the scenario maps".

== Reception ==
Reception

Review scores
Publication	Score
ACE	920/1000 (AMI)
Computer Gaming World	3.5/5 (MS-DOS)
Computer and Video Games	88/100 (AMI)
Joypad	85% (SNES, PAL); 83% (SNES, NA)
Joystick	92% (AMI)
M! Games	69% (SNES)
Nintendo Power	11.6/20 (SNES)
Official Nintendo Magazine	72/100 (SNES)
Video Games (DE)	77% (SNES)
Electronic Games	75% (MS-DOS)
Super Gamer	85/100 (SNES)
The One	93% (AMI)
MikroBitti	89% (AMI)

In 1992 and surveys of science fiction games, Computer Gaming World gave the title three-plus stars out of five.

The One gave the Amiga version of Utopia an overall score of 93%, calling it "a cross between Sim City and Populous - and a rival to both", furthermore stating that Utopia "incorporates so much more than [SimCity]" and that "each game provides a totally new challenge within the first few minutes". The One praises Utopia's difficulty and creativity, expressing that those who achieve a 'quality of life' rating of 100% should "consider a career in public office", and calls the game's alien antagonists "the spark of genius that sets this game apart from other software". The One praises Utopia's graphics and sound, noting a feature where the soundtrack changes depending on the player's performance in-game, and calls the game's isometric perspective "pleasing to the eye".

== Successors ==
Utopia was succeeded by K240, which carried the colonization idea over to an asteroid belt. The most prominent improvement was that in K240, the alien race was no longer off the map, but its cities could be viewed the same way as the player's. K240 was in turn succeeded by Fragile Allegiance, further refining the idea of colonizing an asteroid belt.
