= Xenomorph (video game) =

1990 video game

- Developer(s): Pandora
- Publisher(s): Pandora
- Producer(s): Ray Edwards
- Designer(s): Terry Greer; Ray Edwards
- Programmer(s): David Neale
- Artist(s): Terry Greer
- Writer(s): Steve Hatherley
- Composer(s): Nick Reeve
- Platform(s): Amiga, Atari ST, Commodore 64, MS-DOS
- Release: 1990
- Genre(s): Role-playing, dungeon crawl
- Mode(s): Single-player

Xenomorph is a 1990 role-playing video game developed and published by Pandora for the Amiga and the Atari ST. It was ported to the Commodore 64 and MS-DOS.

== Plot and gameplay ==
Xenomorph is a science-fiction role-playing video game, viewed from a first-person perspective with an icon-driven interface that drew comparisons with Dungeon Master. The storyline is influenced by the early Alien franchise.

The player controls a janitor on a two-year supply run to Sirius who wakes from cryosleep after traversing hyperspace (the big empty) to find his ship, the Mombassa Oak, has been crippled on arrival at its destination (part of it remaining in hyperspace) leaving the ship's computer system failing. The janitor manually pilots the failing ship to the mining platform, Astargatis, to find that the human population has vanished. The player must search the platform for microchips and fuel rods that can be used to repair the Mombassa Oak. In addition, the player character must defend himself against the aliens that are responsible for the attack on Astargatis. The player needs to manage weapons, medical supplies, keycard access, food, energy, and radiation levels in order to survive.

The Atari ST version, if not all versions, was released incomplete. No enemies re-spawned so that after reaching the objective the player was left to wander through a largely empty base to escape. In addition the food and radiation damage did not work and it was impossible to die from these effects. The game included a communicator system but never implemented any communications using it.

== Reception ==
Reception

Review scores
Publication	Score
Computer & Video Games	90% (Amiga); 90% (Atari ST)
Amiga Format	83% (Amiga)

Xenomorph was critically well received. Computer & Video Games highlighted the well-drawn aliens and scenery, addictiveness, and atmosphere of solitude. Some jerky animation was criticised, but overall the Amiga and Atari versions were awarded 90%. Amiga Format awarded 83%, finding the 3D view to be well implemented, and the weapons and equipment to be varied, well-designed and graphically impressive. The lack of a wide variety of sound effects was criticized, as was the lack of an "outer-space" atmosphere. Critics pointed out that drawing a map is important in progressing in Xenomorph, as it is easy to get lost or miss an important location.

== Legacy ==
A sequel to Xenomorph titled Xenomorph II was announced in a February 1991 issue of The One, and was to be developed by the development team behind Into the Eagle's Nest, however, the game was never released and is in dispute. According to rumour, Xenomorph II was to use Into the Eagle's Nest as a framework, but upgraded with "the Xenomorph 3D system", and was announced for a February 1992 release. However one of the original authors of Xenomorph denies this was ever proposed and had other plans for a sequel.
