= K240 =

1994 video game

- Publisher: Gremlin Graphics
- Designers: Graeme Ing; Pete Daniels
- Platform: Amiga
- Release: 1994
- Genre: Real-time strategy
- Mode: Single-player

K240 (Note: Pronounced "K two forty", according to the developer.) is a real-time strategy video game published by Gremlin Graphics and released for the Amiga home computer in 1994. It is a sequel to the 1991 game Utopia: The Creation of a Nation.

== Gameplay ==
K240 is a real-time strategy game where the player manages a franchise of asteroid mining colonies in a distant sector of space. The player begins with control of a single asteroid, a minimal colony, and one Transporter ship used to carry ore and establish new colonies. Gameplay primarily involves constructing various buildings for life support, mining, and defence.

The game takes place in a sector of space contested by one of six alien species, whose technology level and aims are similar to the player. Fog of war primarily limits the player's field of view to a small area around their own colonies, requiring the use of scout ships and spy satellites to locate and observe the enemy. The ultimate goal of the scenario is to destroy all alien asteroid colonies. To this end, both sides can construct armed space ships and deploy a variety of long-range missiles.

The game is controlled primarily with the mouse, with a few keyboard shortcuts. Players must carefully manage their supply of money, which is depleted with construction and gained by things like selling ore and receiving bonuses for defeating the enemy. Colonies also require various needs to be maintained, usually by constructing the appropriate buildings, such as power, food production, and security to maintain morale.

As an early example of its genre, K240 omits certain features which would become standard features of real-time strategy games. The player cannot select individual movement or targets for ships; they can be ordered to a specific asteroid, but once there, they move and fire randomly at enemy targets. There is no research system or tech tree; although advanced technologies can be unlocked, it is by purchasing blueprints with money.

There are six scenarios, each featuring a different alien species with different technology and behaviour. The game is considered "won" when the sixth and final enemy is defeated, although the scenarios can be challenged in any order, and it is technically not necessary to defeat the other five to win the game.

== Plot ==
Screenshot

The year is 2380. The Terran Empire, a vast interstellar civilization spanning over a thousand worlds within three hundred light years of Earth, competes with alien species for territory and resources. Mining franchises have opened in the Fragmented Sectors, a region of space filled with asteroids.

The player conducts one such mining operation inside Sector K240, a cube of space fifty light years across. They must operate in a region of space contested by an hostile alien species, who are seeking to claim the region for themselves. Operating independently and with little official support, the player must establish mining colonies on asteroids, deploying warships and long-range missiles to drive out the aliens and claim the sector for themselves.

== Development ==
K240 was a successor to Utopia: The Creation of a Nation (1991), a sci-fi colony management simulator inspired by Sim City. That game was originally conceived as in the fantasy genre, but switched to futuristic in order to avoid the technical challenge of writing pathfinding code. Utopia used an isometric view in order to appear more visually impressive, and innovated over Sim City with the inclusion of a definitive enemy.

In January 1992, a sequel to Utopia was planned, tentatively scheduled for the end of 1992. Development began in May 1992, following the production of an expansion disk for the original Utopia. The lengthy initial design document was overly ambitious, and included features such as null modem multiplayer which ultimately proved infeasible. However, it defined critical new features as the ability to see the alien city directly, a greater focus on military strategy, and the asteroid-based setting.

K240 was programmed by Graeme Ing, written in assembly language using a PC cross-development setup running SNASM68K. The game's graphics were provided by Pete Daniels, who produced it on an Amiga 500 in Deluxe Paint over the span of six months. These were largely complete by July 1993, although small tweaks would continue to be made late in development. Patrick Phelan was credited with music, although no music appears in the final game. Both he and Neil Biggin are credited with sound effects.

The name K240 was announced in August 1993. It was inspired by the cover of a blank VHS cassette, which bore the letter "K" and the digits "240", likely referring to the tape's 240-minute run time.

A major crash bug was discovered late in development, resulting in Ing working twelve to fourteen hour days in an attempt to fix it before release. The finished game build was made on Friday, 20 May 1994 at 1:31 PM, with producer Mark Glossop delivering the disks to the duplicator in person to meet the deadline. An initial print run was made of 30,000 copies.

== Release ==
Unlike its predecessor, Utopia, K240 was only released on the Amiga platform, where it was available for all Amigas with at least 1 MB of RAM. The game retailed for around £29.99 in the UK, and featured English, French, and German translations.

Demo versions of the game were distributed in the March 1994 issues of British magazine CU Amiga and Australian magazine Amiga Down Under. The demo promised a release date of March 1994, but this would ultimately be delayed. French magazine Amiga Dream also offered a copy of the demo to readers who mailed in.

The finished game hit the shelves in 1994, at some point between 20 May, when the final build was released, and 26 May, when pirate groups TRSI & Zenith produced a cracked copy with the anti-piracy protection removed.

Following the game's release, an updated build was released to fix a bug which could cause the game to crash when moving fleets. The build was produced on 7 June 1994 at 11:15 AM. An updated version of disk 2 was available in exchange by mail, and was also included in later printings of the game, which are distinguished by having white disk label printing instead of orange. A 30-minute tutorial VHS tape was also advertised by a flyer included in these later copies of the game.

== Reception ==
Reception

Review scores
Publication	Score
Amiga Computing	77%
Amiga Format	84%
Amiga Power	83%
Computer and Video Games	89%
Amiga Dream	84%
Amiga Games	75%
Amiga Joker	77%
Amiga Magazine	8.5/10
Amiga Point of View	85%
CU Amiga	91%
Datormagazin	3/5
The One Amiga	90%

Reviews of K240 were generally very positive. Reviewers frequently appreciated the game's engrossing and unique strategic gameplay, but some felt the graphics and sound to be lacking.

CU Amiga rated it 91%, awarding its "Screen Star" accolade, describing its random effects extending the game's longevity. The One Amiga devoted four pages to a review, which ranked it 90%, "Not since Dune 2 have we been treated to such a great strategy game". The Computer and Video Games Essential Guide ranked it 89%, describing K240 as "a masterpiece of strategic excellence" and "one of the best strategy titles ever, on any machine!"

Amiga Format particularly praised the game's smooth user interface, its well-designed manual, and playability, particularly the gameplay focus on crisis management. Amiga Power, known for their lower review scores, rated the game a solid 83%, praising its unique sense of control versus the worry of constant alien attack. However, they were critical of the game's tendency to convey information by distracting pop-ups which pause the game, and the difficulty of managing individual ships.

A similar score of 84% came from French magazine Amiga Dream, which compared K240 to sci-fi colony management sims Millennium 2.2 and Deuteros. The reviewer most highly rated the game's longevity and playability. The Dutch-language Amiga Magazine gave it an 8.5/10, despite the lack of a Dutch language option, and found the strategic gameplay engaging, though were less impressed by the graphics and sound.

Slightly lower contemporary reviews included a score of 77% by German magazine Amiga Joker, whose reviewer Manfred Duy was less impressed by the game's graphics. Amiga Computing's reviewer Jonathan Maddock also felt let down by the game's graphics and sound, rating it also 77% overall, though paradoxically describing it as "a lot better than its predecessor, Utopia", a game which the magazine awarded a 93% score in 1991. Weak scores were also given by German magazine Amiga Games (75%), and the Swedish Datormagazin (3/5), whose reviewer found the user interface confusing and called it "a good attempt at a space-themed strategy game that doesn't quite hit the mark".

Nearly ten years later, Amiga Point of View chose K240 to review in its first issue, with its main criticisms being the user interface and a few design quirks.

== Legacy ==
K240 was succeeded by Fragile Allegiance (1996), a PC remake of the game with improved graphics and user interface. Many of the buildings, ships, missiles, and game concepts are the same, while the story advances to see the Terran Empire dissolved in a coup, and united with several alien races in a multiracial Federation. There are also gameplay differences resulting from ships being given limited range, as well as espionage mechanics.

The MGL data storage format used by K240 would go on to be used in Graeme Ing's 1996 PC game Normality.
