= Gauntlet: The Deeper Dungeons =

1987 video game expansion pack

- Developer: Gremlin Graphics
- Publishers: U.S. Gold, Mindscape
- Series: Gauntlet
- Platforms: Amstrad CPC, Atari 8-bit, Commodore 64, MSX, ZX Spectrum
- Release: 1987

Gauntlet: The Deeper Dungeons is an expansion pack for Gauntlet.

== Gameplay ==
Gauntlet: The Deeper Dungeons is an expansion pack for the original computer ports of Gauntlet with 512 new levels. The player requires the original game to play the expansion. Available player characters are Merlin the Wizard, Thor the Warrior, Thyra the Valkyrie, and Questor the Elf.

The pack significantly increases the amount of enemies to fight. The blue flashing traps appear right from the beginning of the game; these traps remove the walls holding back the enemies. There are also more Deaths to be encountered.

Invisibility amulets and healing potions are more common than in the original game, as is poisoned cider. There is a limit on item inventory, so if players pick up too many potions they will not have enough room for the keys they need.

== Development ==
It was released in 1987 by the British company U.S. Gold in the UK and Europe, and Mindscape in the United States for the Amstrad CPC, MSX, Atari ST, Commodore 64, and ZX Spectrum ports of Gauntlet. It was developed by Gremlin Graphics.

Many of its levels were entries in a competition throughout Europe in which ten winners were awarded prizes, a Gauntlet T-shirt and a copy of the program for their computers. The contest was announced in the instructions of many of the ported games. The levels are presented randomly and its artwork is the side panel artwork of the arcade cabinet with only the main characters shown. The enemies were removed from the image and replaced with a pink background.

== Reception ==
Reviewers noted that the levels were much harder than those in the original game, although the consensus was that it was not quite as good as the first game or the newly-released arcade sequel.

Paul Rixon for Page 6 said "The Deeper Dungeons are simply more of the same – quite a lot more in fact."

Tony Hetherington for Your Commodore said "If you enjoyed the original Gauntlet (if not, why not?) then you'll relish another 512 levels which could be training for things to come as Gauntlet II is now in most arcades."

Sara Biggs for Your Sinclair said "If you're hooked on Gauntlet, then you've probably already got your fiver put on one side for this. if you weren't convinced by the original, then you'll not be very interested, but I can't help it if you're soft in the head! Rollicking good fun – I love it!"

Sinclair User said "Deeper Dungeons extends Gauntlet's life, but only by cramming more of them same into the game. US Gold did right by sticking on a low price tag, you might even call this a budget release".

ZX Computing said "The graphics and gameplay are just as quick and impressive as the original which won't disappoint Gauntlet addicts but for a sequel I would have liked the inclusion of some new monsters and magic artefacts to collect."

Computer Gamer said "More of the same, no matter how devious, doesn't seem to be enough. At [the lower price] for another 512 levels no Gauntlet player is going to complain but it could have been so much better."
