= Trollie Wallie =

1984 video game

- Publisher: Interceptor Micros
- Designer: Andrew Challis
- Platforms: Commodore 64, Amstrad CPC
- Release: 1984: C64; 1986: Amstrad CPC

Trollie Wallie is a platform game for the Commodore 64 written by Andrew Challis and published in 1984 by Interceptor Micros. An Amstrad CPC port was released in 1986. Trollie Wallie is a sequel to Wheelin' Wallie from the same year.

== Gameplay ==
Trollie Wallie takes place inside a labyrinthine supermarket where ladders, slides, and conveyor belts to form a devilish maze. Nightmarish creatures wander around inside the supermarket. Numerous items are scattered around. It is the job of Wallie, guided by the player, to take every item to the checkout counter.

The game is played over one large map, which scrolls in any direction as needed by Wallie's movement. Wallie starts from the lower left corner and the checkout counter is at the lower right corner.

Wallie can only carry a maximum of five items at a time, at which point they have to be taken to the checkout counter. Because of this, the player must learn to divide the game play into several trips. Forty items must be collected in order to complete the game.

The background music for Trollie Wallie consists of versions of Popcorn by Hot Butter and Equinoxe (part 5, 6 and 7) by Jean Michel Jarre. It was arranged by Graham Hansford.
