= Grumpy Gumphrey Supersleuth =

1985 video game

- Developer: Shaun Hollingworth
- Publisher: Gremlin Graphics
- Platform: ZX Spectrum
- Release: 1985
- Genre: Action-adventure
- Mode: Single-player

Grumpy Gumphrey Supersleuth, often known simply as Super Sleuth, is a computer game for the ZX Spectrum by Gremlin Graphics, a software developer based in Sheffield, UK. It is an action-adventure game: the player controls Grumpy, a store detective and general dogsbody working in a large department store. The game was developed by Shaun Hollingworth with loading-screen graphics by Marco Duroe.

== Gameplay ==
The player takes the role of an ageing store detective, 'Grumpy' Gumphrey, and the aim is for Gumphrey to keep his job. In order to do so, he must fulfil various tasks assigned to him by various shoppers, and by the boss of the store, known only as 'Sir'. Although Gumphrey is described as a 'store detective', he has to complete a number of tasks more associated with a cleaner or engineer, such as spraying bugs in the cafe, repairing the lift, and tidying the storeroom. Some of the tasks verge on the surreal, such as shooting ducks that have entered the store, and caging a gorilla on the loose.

The game is set in a large, traditional department store named 'Mole Bros'; the name is a nod to Wanted: Monty Mole, a 1984 Gremlin Graphics game that had proved a hit as well as a popular Sheffield Department Store "Cole Brothers". The player character in Grumpy Gumphrey Supersleuth can visit 39 screens, designed to look like the different areas in a department store, with different kinds of merchandise, as well as a cafe, a kitchen, a store room, a boiler room, and the manager's office.

Screenshot of Grumpy Gumphrey Supersleuth gameplay, running on ZX Spectrum.

The tasks generally involve puzzles that require Grumpy to acquire certain items and use them in a particular way in certain screens. They may also require dexterous manipulation of the player character. For example, the first task requires Grumpy to steal the handgun from under his boss's chair – a feat that requires careful keyboard or joystick work – in order to shoot the ducks.

Grumpy is hampered by other shoppers (non player characters) in the store, and must work against the clock to complete the tasks on time. Failure to do so will result in a warning letter from the boss; four warning letters lead to game over.

== Reception ==
Grumpy Gumphrey Supersleuth was well-received when published. Sinclair User gave the game 5/5 stars, while Crash awarded an 86% rating. Both magazines highlighted the originality of the game, with Sinclair User praising the 'novel plot', and Crash calling Grumpy the 'first geriatric hero to star in a computer game'. Both magazines also praised the game's graphics, animation, and its polish.
