= Switchblade (video game) =

1989 video game

- Developer: Core Design
- Publishers: Gremlin Graphics: Erbe, Kixx (ST); GBH Gold, Kixx (Amiga); GBH (C64, Spectrum); Amiga, Inc. (BlackBerry); Piko Interactive (Jaguar, Mega Drive)
- Designer: Simon Phipps
- Composer: Ben Daglish
- Series: Switchblade
- Platform: Atari ST: Amiga, Amstrad CPC, GX4000, BlackBerry, Commodore 64, ZX Spectrum, Jaguar, Genesis
- Release: 1989: Atari ST; EU: 1989 Amiga; EU: 1989 GX4000; EU: 1990 Amstrad CPC; EU: 1991 Commodore 64; EU: 1991 ZX Spectrum; EU: 1991 BlackBerry; WW: 30 April 2013 Jaguar; WW: September 7, 2017 Genesis; WW: April 15, 2019
- Genre: Action-platform
- Mode: Single-player

Switchblade is a 1989 action-platform video game developed by Core Design and published by Gremlin Graphics for the Atari ST. The first installment in the eponymous two-part series, the game is set in a dystopian future where players assume the role of Hiro from the Blade Knights as he embarks on a journey to defeat Havok, the main antagonist who broke free from his imprisonment after the sacred Fireblade was shattered into several pieces. Its gameplay consists of run and gun action mixed with platforming and exploration elements, with a main single-button configuration.

Heavily drawing inspiration from both Japanese and Western pop culture as well as various games, Switchblade was solely created by Core Design co-founder and Rick Dangerous designer Simon Phipps in his spare time, who took a year and a half to complete it while working alongside on other projects at the company. Initially released for the Atari ST platform, the title was later ported to other microcomputers and consoles including the Amiga, Amstrad CPC, GX4000, Commodore 64 and ZX Spectrum, each with several changes and additions from the original version.

Since its original release on the Atari ST, Switchblade garnered mostly positive reception from critics who praised multiple aspects such as the anime-inspired presentation, visuals, sound design and gameplay but others criticized the game's slow pacing, controls and difficulty. Other versions of the game were met with a similarly positive response from reviewers. Its critical success would prompt the development of a sequel eight months later, Switchblade II, which was created by a new team at Gremlin Graphics without the involvement of Phipps and garnered a positive reception from the public as with the original title upon its release on Amiga, but was not widely ported to other platforms.

== Gameplay ==
Atari ST screenshot

Switchblade is a side-scrolling platform game with run and gun elements. Players assume the role of Hiro on his quest through a subterranean labyrinth in Undercity, fighting against enemies and avoiding hazards in order to reunite 16 scattered fragments of the sacred Fireblade sword and use it against Havok, an evil entity who broke free from his imprisonment.

The player guides Hiro in a flip-screen environment, where unexplored areas of the screen are obscured from view until the player character enters them. Depending on the level of charge, Hiro can use melee attacks against enemies and he can also use weapons that are found in either crates, hidden on certain rooms or suddenly appearing in the area, which are equipped into his cybernetic arm.

The player also fights bosses that are blocking the current path in order to progress further. Players can also collect letters spelling bonus and extra, which grants points and an extra life respectively. All of the actions in the game are performed different depending on the version, with one button and a joystick in the home computer versions, while the d-pad and two buttons are used in the GX4000 version. Losing a life gives Hiro a brief period of invincibility but once all lives are lost in the playthrough, the game is over, forcing players to restart from the beginning.

== Plot ==
Switchblade takes place in a post-apocalyptic future where the Undercity in the Cyberworld of Traxx has been submerged into chaos and slaughtering with the awakening of Havok, an evil entity who broke free from his ten thousand-year-long imprisonment once the sacred Fireblade shattered into pieces and lost its power, along with the death of the Blade Knights order. Hiro, the last of the deceased knight order, embarks on a quest to restore the Fireblade and defeat Havok to end his evil regime.

== Development ==
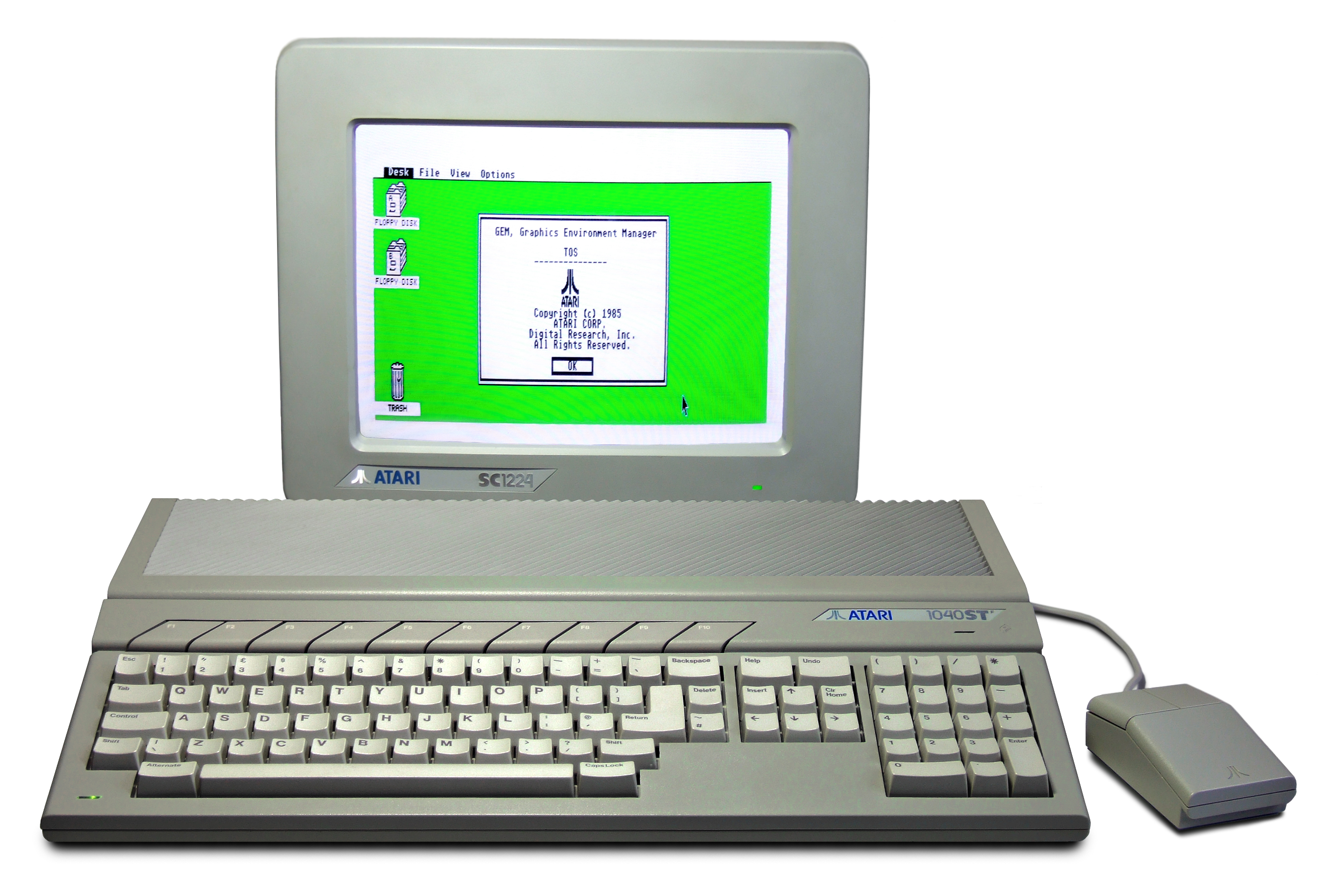
Switchblade was Simon Phipps' first game for the Atari ST, inspired by Japanese and Western pop culture.

Switchblade was solely created by Core Design co-founder Simon Phipps in his spare time and became the first title he wrote for the Atari ST, but due to the nature of its development process, it took approximately eighteen months in reaching completion while he began and finished various other projects at his company, most notably Rick Dangerous, with Phipps stating he desired producing a project that felt similar to arcade and home console titles during this era due to his fascination with Japanese artwork.

Several pieces of media from both Japanese and Western pop culture served as sources of inspiration for the project such as Akira, Blade Runner, Cities of the Red Night, Mad Max and The Wild Boys music video, as well as video games like Bubble Bobble, Ranarama and Underwurlde, which would influence various gameplay mechanics in the final product, in addition to disadvantages with the ST hardware that also affected its design structure. Phipps stated that he enjoyed making the game, as he did not face deadlines and pressure, citing his then-artistic and technical abilities as the project's only limitations. However, Phipps said on his personal web page about the game's development cycle that due to his constantly improving programming experience while working on other titles at Core Design, he regressed back to previously written code for improvement, referring it as the only negative of the project. The music was composed by Ben Daglish.

== Release ==
Switchblade was first released for the Atari ST and later the Amiga in Europe in December 1989, with minimal differences between each one. In 1990, an enhanced conversion of the game was published by Gremlin Graphics for the Amstrad GX4000 and made use of the system's Mode 1, which allowed a 320x200 resolution display and more colors on-screen. It was also ported to the Amstrad CPC, Commodore 64 and ZX Spectrum by Gremlin as well in 1991. Almost all versions of the game would later be re-released as budget titles by GBH, GBH Gold and Kixx respectively. In 2017, Piko Interactive ported and released Switchblade worldwide to the Atari Jaguar after acquiring the rights to the title, with a brand-new hand-drawn cover art by Simon Phipps. Based upon the original ST version, this version features music from the Amiga port. A Sega Genesis port came in 2019, featuring redrawn visuals and a rearranged soundtrack.

== Reception ==
Reception
Review scores
| Publication | Scores | | | | | |
| Publication | Atari ST | Amiga | GX4000 | Amstrad CPC | C64 | ZX Spectrum |
|---|---|---|---|---|---|---|
| ACE | —N/a | 805 / 1000 | —N/a | —N/a | —N/a | —N/a |
| Aktueller Software Markt | 6 / 12 | 6 / 12 | —N/a | —N/a | —N/a | —N/a |
| Amiga Action | —N/a | 80% | —N/a | —N/a | —N/a | —N/a |
| Amiga Computing | —N/a | 79% | —N/a | —N/a | —N/a | —N/a |
| Amiga Format | —N/a | 85% | —N/a | —N/a | —N/a | —N/a |
| Amiga Joker | —N/a | 69% | —N/a | —N/a | —N/a | —N/a |
| Amiga Power | —N/a | 70% 3/5 | —N/a | —N/a | —N/a | —N/a |
| Amstrad Action | —N/a | —N/a | 94% | —N/a | —N/a | —N/a |
| Amstrad Cent Pour Cent | —N/a | —N/a | 90% | 91% | —N/a | —N/a |
| Commodore Computer Club | —N/a | 7+ | —N/a | —N/a | —N/a | —N/a |
| Commodore Format | —N/a | —N/a | —N/a | —N/a | 78% | —N/a |
| Computer and Video Games | —N/a | 93% 83% | —N/a | —N/a | —N/a | —N/a |
| CVG Mean Machines | —N/a | —N/a | 92% | —N/a | —N/a | —N/a |
| Crash | —N/a | —N/a | —N/a | —N/a | —N/a | 81% |
| Games-X | —N/a | —N/a | —N/a | —N/a | —N/a | 4.5/5 |
| The Games Machine | —N/a | 78% | —N/a | —N/a | —N/a | —N/a |
| Génération 4 | 90% | 90% | —N/a | —N/a | —N/a | —N/a |
| Guida Videogiochi | —N/a | 17 / 20 | —N/a | —N/a | —N/a | —N/a |
| Joystick | —N/a | 80% | 87% | 88% | —N/a | —N/a |
| K | —N/a | 805 / 1000 | —N/a | —N/a | —N/a | —N/a |
| Mean Machines | —N/a | —N/a | 91% | —N/a | —N/a | —N/a |
| MicroHobby | —N/a | —N/a | —N/a | —N/a | —N/a | 89% |
| The One | 88% 5/5 | 5/5 | —N/a | —N/a | —N/a | —N/a |
| The One for Amiga Games | —N/a | 5/5 | —N/a | —N/a | —N/a | —N/a |
| The One for ST Games | 5/5 | —N/a | —N/a | —N/a | —N/a | —N/a |
| Player One | —N/a | —N/a | 82% | —N/a | —N/a | —N/a |
| Power Play | 79% 56% | 79% 79% | —N/a | —N/a | 72% | —N/a |
| Raze | —N/a | —N/a | 75% | —N/a | —N/a | —N/a |
| Sinclair User | —N/a | —N/a | —N/a | —N/a | —N/a | 69% |
| ST Action | 79% | —N/a | —N/a | —N/a | —N/a | —N/a |
| ST Format | 58% | —N/a | —N/a | —N/a | —N/a | —N/a |
| Tilt | —N/a | 17 / 20 | 16 / 20 | 15 / 20 | —N/a | —N/a |
| Your Commodore | —N/a | —N/a | —N/a | —N/a | 85% | —N/a |
| Your Sinclair | —N/a | —N/a | —N/a | —N/a | —N/a | 92° / 100° 93° / 100° |
| Zero | 88 / 100 | 90 / 100; 89/ 100 | —N/a | —N/a | —N/a | —N/a |
| Zzap!64 | —N/a | 70% | —N/a | —N/a | 67% 78% | —N/a |
Awards
| Publication(s) | | Award(s) | | | | |
| Amiga Power (1991) | | #91 All Time Top 100 Amiga Games | | | | |

Switchblade received mostly positive reception since its release across multiple platforms.

== Legacy ==
A sequel, Switchblade II, had already been in development by the time Switchblade was released eight months on the market and garnered critical success that prompted its creation, but Phipps had no direct involvement in its development and was handled by a new team instead. It was released in 1991, the same year that the enhanced Amstrad GX4000 console port of the original was published and received positive reception from critics and the general public.
