= Re-Loaded =

1996 video game

- Developer: Gremlin Interactive
- Publishers: NA: Interplay Entertainment; PAL: Gremlin Interactive
- Platforms: PlayStation, MS-DOS
- Release: PAL: 6 December 1996; NA: 11 December 1996
- Genre: Multidirectional shooter
- Modes: Single-player, multiplayer

Re-Loaded is a science fiction-themed top-down multidirectional shooter developed by Gremlin Interactive and published by Interplay. A sequel to Loaded, it was released in 1996 for the PlayStation and MS-DOS, and later on PlayStation Network. A Sega Saturn version was in development, but was cancelled.

The game received mostly negative reviews from critics.

== Gameplay ==
Re-Loaded features the same game engine as Loaded, and even the game menus are the same, although the graphics are slightly improved. Four characters from the original game are also in Re-Loaded: Mamma, Bounca, Butch, and Cap'n Hands. Vox, however, is not present and is replaced by two female characters: a pink-haired, cannibalistic sex symbol named The Consumer, and a malfunctioning android nun named Sister Magpie. Via cheat code, Sister Magpie can unlock hidden character Fwank from the previous game for use in Re-Loaded. If unlocked, Fwank is the best character in Re-Loaded, with the most speed and strongest armour. All of the returning characters have new weapons and/or variations of their costumes. The characters can also jump. There are twelve worlds, all much larger than the levels encountered in the previous game, and with the added bonus of being able to morph the surrounding terrain by using high-powered weaponry and explosives.

== Plot ==
F.U.B., the antagonist of Loaded, had his body destroyed at the end of the previous game, although his brain fled in an escape pod. Landing on a harsh desert world, Kee-Butt-5, his brain has been implanted into the body of a chiselled, bronzed young artist hermit named Manuel Auto. Then he murdered the loyal surgeons responsible for giving him a new body. Reincarnated and renamed "C.H.E.B.", which stands for "Charming Handsome Erudite Bastard", the former raving lunatic supervillain has taken on some of the aspects of his host body, the creative, artistic and thoughtful Manuel Auto. With his matter manipulation powers, C.H.E.B. plans to transform whole planets into "Works Of Art and Genius", starting with his own body, which he grows to the size of a small moon. Once again, the group of blood-thirsty anti-heroes gather to bring him down once and for all, and set off for Kee-Butt-5.

== Reception ==
Reception

Review scores
Publication	Score
Electronic Gaming Monthly	4.675/10
GameSpot	3.7/10
IGN	4.0/10
Next Generation	2/5

Critical approval for the Loaded formula had considerably soured by the time the Saturn port of the original was released, and had worsened further by the time the sequel arrived. Critics generally felt that Re-Loaded's more complex level designs and rendered graphics did not do enough to advance the series beyond its by-then poorly regarded predecessor, or even were inferior to it. A reviewer for Next Generation pointed out that the elements which had made Loaded popular and critically praised - its transparencies, lighting effects, frantic action, and gory violence - were all commonplace on PlayStation games by the time Re-Loaded was released.

In addition, some critics remarked that the slower pace and more puzzle-driven approach led to long spurts of wandering around the levels looking for items, making the game much more dull than Loaded. However, Major Mike of GamePro (which featured Re-Loaded on the cover of the issue where it was reviewed) said that this was the game's strongest aspect, though he acknowledged "some may find the game too slow and plodding." Additionally praising the graphics, sound effects, and mood-appropriate music, he concluded Re-Loaded "adds enough new and diverse elements to rise above the 'more of the same' stigma, yet manages to keep the core aspects that made the original game so much fun." In contrast, IGN said "Almost every great aspect of the original game has been compromised" and concluded that it was "third-rate". Jeff Gerstmann of GameSpot wrote "the entire Loaded series is a horrible version of the Atari classic, Gauntlet ... Take away the blood 'n' guts and all that's left is a pathetic excuse for a game, 32-bit or otherwise." Crispin Boyer echoed Gerstmann's remarks in Electronic Gaming Monthly: "I was hoping this game would be worlds better than last year's dull, repetitive Loaded. Instead, Re-Loaded is just another mindless action game that hurts your hands and has you jonesing to play good ol' Gauntlet."
