= Gary Lineker's Superstar Soccer =

1987 video game

- Commodore 64 cover art
- Developer: SportTime
- Publishers: NA: Mindscape; EU: Gremlin Interactive
- Designer: John Fitzpatrick
- Platforms: Commodore 64, ZX Spectrum, Amstrad CPC
- Release: Commodore 64: NA: 1987; EU: 1987
- Genre: Traditional sports simulator
- Modes: Single-player, multiplayer

Gary Lineker's Superstar Soccer is a computer game released in 1987 for the Amstrad CPC, Commodore 64 and ZX Spectrum, published by Gremlin Interactive in Europe, and by Mindscape as Superstar Soccer in the USA.

== Gameplay ==
Superstar Soccer is an arcade action soccer simulation game. The player controls one player at a time. In addition to taking the role of the centre forward, the player is also the manager of the team, responsible for hiring players and setting training regimes.

== Reception ==
Reception

Review scores
Publication	Score
Crash	52%
Dragon	3/5
Sinclair User	6/10
Your Sinclair	6/10
ACE	906
Zzap!64	74%

The game was reviewed in 1988 in Dragon #132 by Hartley, Patricia, and Kirk Lesser in "The Role of Computers" column. The reviewers gave the game 3 out of 5 stars.

Zzap!64 magazine awarded the game 74%, describing it as "a pleasant and well-produced football game that is very playable, even if it isn't that true-to-life".

== Reviews ==
- ACE – February 1988, 739 out of 1,000 (74)
- Tilt – February 1988, 13 out of 20 (65)
- Your Sinclair – February 1988, 6 out of 10 (60)
- Aktueller Software Markt – December 1987

== See also ==
- Gary Lineker
