= Zone X =

1985 video game

- Publisher: Gremlin Graphics
- Designer: Derek Johnston
- Platform: Atari 8-bit
- Release: 1985
- Genre: Maze

Zone X is a maze video game designed by Derek Johnston and published by Gremlin Graphics in 1985 for Atari 8-bit computers.

== Gameplay ==
Gameplay screenshot

The player enters a mine to collect all the scattered plutonium samples. His protective suit gives him radioactive protection, which decreases as he carries the plutonium. The player will lose his life if he fails to deposit the plutonium in the container within the allotted time. There are other obstacles in the mine, such as laser doors and robots. The player can also find useful items such as keys used to open locked doors, shovels useful for digging through crumbling walls, or mats that block robots and can be used to confine them in an enclosed area.

To complete each level, the player must dispose all the plutonium into containers and find the exit door.

== Reception ==
Richard Vanner writing for Atari User advised to "forget the cover and enjoy the story". He found the game "a nice offering that should keep the best of gamers occupied for many weeks".
