= The Heroes of Karn =

1983 video game

- Developer: Ian Gray
- Publisher: Interceptor Software
- Platforms: Commodore 64, ZX Spectrum, Amstrad CPC
- Release: UK: 1983
- Genre: Adventure
- Mode: Single-player video game

The Heroes of Karn is a 1983 adventure game written by Ian Gray. It was released by Interceptor Micros for the Commodore 64, Amstrad CPC and ZX Spectrum. Music was written by Chris Cox. The Spectrum and Amstrad versions were adapted by David M. Banner with graphics by Terry Greer. A sequel, Empire of Karn, was released in 1985 on the Commodore 64.

== Gameplay ==
The player must rescue four heroes who have been magically imprisoned, and thus save the land of Karn from dominion by evil creatures. The heroes are Beren the swordsman, Istar the wizard, Haldir the Elf-lord and Khadim the dwarf.

The game's parser accepts relatively complex sentences for the time (e.g. "attack giant clam with shovel"). The puzzles are mostly straightforward, involving the use of an object found elsewhere to defeat the creature that is impeding progress. The creatures and NPCs in the game, including the heroes themselves, are rather inert and are very limited in their interactions. The game has 65 locations. The game is mostly text, with illustrations for some of the locations.

== Reception ==
The Commodore 64 version was criticised for slow loading of graphical scenes.
