= Realms of the Haunting =

- Developer: Gremlin Interactive
- Publisher: Interplay Productions
- Producers: Tom Lauten; Jerry Luttrell
- Designer: Paul Green
- Programmer: Antony Crowther
- Artist: Christopher Pepper
- Writer: Paul Green
- Composer: Chris Adams
- Platform: MS-DOS
- Release: EU: December 1996; NA: March 24, 1997
- Genres: Adventure, first-person shooter
- Mode: Single-player

Realms of the Haunting is a 1996 first-person shooter/horror adventure video game developed by Gremlin Interactive and published by Interplay Productions for MS-DOS personal computers. Its gameplay is a hybrid of point-and-click puzzle-solving/exploration and first-person action, interspersed with full-motion video sequences featuring live-action actors. The player takes the role of Adam Randall investigating a haunted mansion in remote Cornwall after his father's death, only to be tasked in preventing an impending apocalypse with help from a psychic Rebecca Trevisard.

The game is powered by programmer Antony Crother's True3D game engine, which was also used in Gremlin's earlier adventure game Normality. It was first released in United Kingdom on four compact discs at December 1996, then a patched version in United States on March 24, 1997 with additional combat difficulties and rebind-able keyboard controls.

== Gameplay ==
Realms of the Haunting plays from a first-person perspective in a three-dimensional (3D) environment. Players can use a mouse cursor to click on specific objects to interact with, examined with a descriptive remark from the character, or collect them into their inventory. Unlike most adventure games at the time that used pre-rendered static backgrounds only navigable by clicking on hotspots, players can freely roam and view real-time 3D environments from all angles. Objects and enemies are however 2D sprites rendered at fixed angles, known as billboarding.

Players can use a variety of weapons to aim at enemies including monsters and demons to fend them off. These weapons are either melee/firearms including a sword, a Colt-45 pistol, a Winchester M1897 shotgun, a flintlock grenade launcher, or magical artifacts with secondary uses such as a staff, a ward-dispelling wand or a dagger. When starting a new game, player can select from four 'arcade' difficulty levels which determines the amount of damage enemies can do and the weapons' effectiveness, as well as from two 'adventure' difficulty levels which lets the game automatically equip the correct object to successfully interact with another. The story of Realms of the Haunting is mainly conveyed through full-motion video cutscenes utilizing live-action actors, as well as reading letters, journals and scrolls scattered throughout the world.

== Plot ==
A young expatriate Englishman Adam Randall (David Tuomi) ventures to an old remote mansion in Helston, Cornwall discovered by his estranged pastor father to investigate the mysterious circumstances around his death. He was drawn there after being plagued by intensifying nightmares of the house and his father under torment, as well as receiving shattered wax seals hand-delivered by a suspicious so-called friend of his father. Upon entering, his father's ghost urges his son to not only free his tormented soul but also seek a knight for guidance. He then collected a powerful artifact Shrive deep within an secret underground mausoleum, and eventually meets the knight Aelf (Dave Roberts) whose spirit tasks Adam on a cryptic mission. Adam is then joined by a knowledgeable psychic lecturer Rebecca Trevisard (Emma Powell), also called to the mansion and helps provide invaluable insight in making sense of the mysteries surrounding its sprawling, sinister halls.

Soon, Adam and Rebecca discovered within exploring the mansion so-called tower gates, portals that can teleport them to different realms of the universe: Heled, which is Earth; Raquia, the Realm of Spirit; Arqua, the place of Divinity; and Sheol, the abode of Hell; all connected together by an alternate dimension known as the Tower. They were eventually pursued by an immortal French sorcerer Claude Florentine (Marc Finn) and the demon Belial (David Learner), who both want to snatch the Shrive from Adam so they can complete their centuries-long plan to unleash demons on Earth. With the help of Aelf and other ghostly knights, Adam and Rebecca must travel across space and time to recover the Sword of St Michael and prevent the apocalypse.

== Development and release ==
Realms of the Haunting was Gremlin's most ambitious and expensive project ever, and took three years to make. The idea for a 3D shooter/adventure hybrid game was conceived by programmer Antony Crowther, who had recently developed a new Doom-like 3D game engine called "True3D" (though not fully polygonal 3D as it still uses sprites for objects and enemies). After leaving Mindscape, he returned to his previous employer Gremlin (where he was formerly company director back in 1984 before leaving shortly after.) to propose two ideas to base his new engine on: a horror or fantasy game, to which Gremlin chose the former. Crowther would provide programming tools and tech support, while Gremlin would provide writers, designers, artists and rest of the staff to help bring his idea to life.

Game designer and writer Paul Green was responsible for creating its plot, characters and setting. The fictional lore was based on various real-life legends, folklore, religious and historical texts, including Hebrew texts on Heaven and Hell, the Knights Templar, the Seven Seals as well as the 1982 speculative fiction The Holy Blood and The Holy Grail. Horror movies including Michael Mann's The Keep and John Carpenter's The Thing inspired the game's horror atmosphere. The 3D environments were built with an in-house map editor made by Crowther and then textured using 3D Studio, Deluxe Paint and Photoshop.

The full-motion video sequences were directed and edited by Alan Coltman with visual effects including prosthetics, makeup, props and costumes by Bright Light Studios in Warwickshire. The studio is provided original reference materials from Gremlin including scripts, storyboards, concept art, etc. to guide their art/stage direction. Actors were filmed in front of a blue-screen with a Betacam recorder, who are then composited into backgrounds rendered from the same in-game environments on Silicon Graphics workstations. 25 hours of live-action footage were filmed over six weeks within a single cramped room, before being edited down to two hours of cutscenes for the final release.

A DOSBox emulated version was released for digital download on Microsoft Windows, Linux and Mac OS X at GOG.com at 2011 and Steam at 2014 by Funbox Media. Funbox also released a limited edition physical boxed edition on May 1, 2026.

== Reception ==
Reception

Aggregate score
| Aggregator | Score |
|---|---|
| GameRankings | 92% |

Review scores
| Publication | Score |
|---|---|
| Computer Gaming World | 4.5/5 |
| GameRevolution | 9/10 |
| GameSpot | 8.5/10 |
| Next Generation | 4/5 |
| Just Adventure | A |
| PC Games | B+ |

Realms of the Haunting was met with critical acclaim. It received an average score of 92% at GameRankings, based on an aggregate of 7 reviews. Though he noted a lack of originality in the basic plot, Air Hendrix of GamePro found the high-quality cinematics, atmospheric presentation, and overall strong gameplay as both a puzzle adventure and a first-person shooter made Realms of the Haunting a captivating experience. He summarized, "While sometimes it gets frustratingly arbitrary, overall the adventure side, action side, and story line blend together quite nicely." Both Air Hendrix and a Next Generation critic remarked that the controls are clunky at first, but can be adjusted to with time. Next Generation was most impressed with the game's massive size, reckoning that it takes 80 to 100 hours to complete, rarely reuses textures or architectural designs in different areas, and has a huge variety of monsters. The reviewer concluded, "For something that came from Interplay with very little fanfare, Realms of the Haunting could be one of the best adventure games of this year."

During the Academy of Interactive Arts & Sciences' inaugural Interactive Achievement Awards, Realms of the Haunting was a finalist for "PC Adventure Game of the Year" and "Computer Entertainment Title of the Year", which ultimately went to Blade Runner and StarCraft, respectively.
