= Interceptor Micros =

Software companies of the United Kingdom

Interceptor Micros, also known as Interceptor Software and later as Interceptor Group, was a British developer/publisher of video games for various 8-bit and 16-bit computer systems popular in Western Europe during the eighties and early nineties.

In addition to publishing games and utilities under the Interceptor label the company ran a tape and later disc duplication business, a print shop and associated graphic design studio, manufactured dual size cassette tape cases under the Compact Case Company brand and published budget software under the Players and Players Premier labels, and a few full-price titles under the premium Pandora label.

The company was owned and operated by father-and-son team Julian and Richard Jones, out of various locations in and around the small town of Tadley, near Basingstoke in Hampshire, England. At the height of its success the company employed around thirty people, but it fell victim to the 1990s video game decline and went out of business in the early nineties.

== Early days ==
Richard and Julian's first foray into the computer games business is documented on the official Llamasoft web site, with the Joneses and Jeff Minter forming a partnership in 1982. Although the Llamasoft account of the parties' short relationship and the events surrounding the dissolution of the partnership reflect Jeff Minter and his family's opinions, the key facts and dates do not seem to be in dispute. The Jones' and Minters' short-lived partnership ended in September 1982. History has shown that neither party's interest in the business suffered from the split, with Jeff retaining the Llamasoft name and the Joneses forming Interceptor. The company released several clones of arcade games but decided to focus on developing more original titles, as stricter copyright laws meant the clones could not be sold in the USA.

== The Interceptor Label ==
The following titles were published under the Interceptor label:

- After Shock
- Aquanaut
- Asiento
- Assembler 64
- Azimuth 3000
- Bandana City
- Big Ben
- Bigtop Barney
- Break Fever (C64)
- BurgerTime (C64)
- Caverns of Sillahc
- China Miner
- Crazy Kong 64
- Crystals of Carus
- Cuddly Cuburt
- Defender 64
- Forest at the World's End
- Frogger 64
- Front Line
- Get Off My Garden!
- Guzzler
- The Heroes Of Karn
- The Empire of Karn
- Jewels of Babylon
- LA Police Dept.
- Melonmania
- Message from Andromeda
- Micro Rescue
- Missile Command
- Panic 64
- Quango
- Scramble 64
- Siren City
- Spider and the Fly
- Spriteman 64
- Star Trek
- Sword of Kings
- Tales of the Arabian Nights
- The Zacaron Mystery
- Token of Ghall
- Trollie Wallie
- Vortex Raider
- Wallie Goes To Rhymeland (C64)
- Warlord
- Where's my Bones?
- Wheelin' Wallie (C64)
- Wild Ride (C64)
- Wunda Walter (Vic 20)

== The Players and Players Premier labels ==
From 1986 to 1991 Players issued budget-priced £1.99 tape-based games for various 8-bit platforms. The Players Premier label games were priced at £2.99. In addition some titles were released for the Atari ST and Amiga platforms on disc at £4.99 under the Smash 16 and Players Gold labels. The titles competed against budget software pioneer Mastertronic, and later Codemasters and others in an increasingly crowded budget software marketplace.

Players packaging was bright and colourful. The original concept was designed by Michael Wood, an artist and designer and the then Studio Manager at Interceptor. Most of the packaging artwork at the time was designed by Michael Wood who had several artists working with him. The designs were worked up as finished pieces by air brush artists such as Peter Austin.

The label's most successful and best-known releases were the Joe Blade series of games (1987–1989), but Players and Players Premier released over 100 titles across various platforms.

Players original titles included Anfractuos, Auriga, Auto Zone, Big Top Barney, Bubble Trouble, Cagara, Cerberus, The Claws of Despair, Clean Up Time, Crazy Coaster, Crime Busters, Cybernation, Denizen, Desert Hawk, Deviants, Dizzy Dice, Doodlebug, Elektrix, European Soccer Challenge, Excelsor, Fungus, Fruity, Joe Blade, Joe Blade II, Journey to the Centre of Eddie Smith's Head, Killapede, LA Drugs Bust, Lop Ears, Matt Lucas, Metal Army, Miami Cobra GT, Nuclear Heist, Psycho City, Radius, Reflex, Riding the Rapids, Ronald Rubberduck, The Serf's Tale, Shanghai Karate, Shanghai Warriors, Shrewsbury Key, Skateboard Construction System, Stratosphere, Street Gang, Super Nova, Swamp Fever, Sword Slayer, Tanium, Thing!, Toadforce, Tomcat, Turbo Kart Racer, Varmit, Xanthius, and The Zacaron Mystery.

Players Premier original titles included Assault Course, Cobra Force, Deadly Evil, Elven Warrior, Havoc, Hawk Storm, Iron Soldier, Joe Blade III, Lost Caves, Mig Busters, Moving Target, Mutant Fortress, Operation Hanoi, Outlaw, Prison Riot, The Race, Roadburner, Saigon Combat Unit, Shark, 3D Snooker, Solar Empire, Spooked, Steel Eagle, Street Cred Boxing, Street Cred Football, Subway Vigilante, Super League, Task Force, Turbo Master, Velocipede, Velocipede II, War Machine, and World Cup Challenge.

In addition, both labels re-released various full price titles and various games and demos for magazine cover-mounted tapes, which Interceptor duplicated for various computer magazines.

== The Pandora label ==
In 1987 Interceptor launched Pandora, a new premium-priced label. Pandora released several games for 8- and 16-bit computers. Its first and most successful title was Into the Eagle's Nest, a Gauntlet style burst-scroller set in a Nazi occupied castle. Other titles included Galdregon's Domain (1988), Xenomorph (1990), Outlands (1989) and Debut (1990). It is believed Debut (a complex planet simulator coupled with a side-scroller action element) was one of the last titles to be published under the Pandora label, in December 1990.

== The Fun Factory label ==
In 1991 and 1992, during the waning days of the company several Atari ST and Amiga titles were released under the Fun Factory Brand. Titles included Twin Turbos (1991), Rebellion (1992), Slackskin and Flint (1992).

== People ==
Richard Jones was the public face of the company, and all published titles credited him as producer. Due to his youth, ambition and love of fast cars he often appeared on local television and in the papers during the early years. However, Julian was the company mainstay, working long hours, often on the factory floor, building the company.

Interceptor worked with various programmers, artists, and musicians over the years, relying mostly on freelance talent but also employing a number of up and coming in-house coders.

Foremost amongst the in-house programmers were Andrew Challis and Kevin Parker. Apart from developing original titles and porting existing games to other platforms they also developed custom "loaders" and produced the tape masters for the duplication of Interceptor and other companies titles. Interceptor pioneered "loada-games" across multiple platforms, not just the C64 (see the Spectrum version of Joe Blade 2). These were a series of mini games that you could play while the main game continued to load from tape. While technically clever, this occasionally resulted in customers returning product mistaking the loada-game for the advertised content.

Other in-house developers included Andrew Severn (last spotted as producer of Gun for Nethersoft), Martin (Jabba) Severn (last spotted working for Pumpkin Studios), Gary Biasillo, Steve Briggs, Chris Johnson (who later worked for SEGA in San Francisco and as a Lead Producer at Zynga), Mike Brown, Paul Griffiths, Robin Chapman and Colin Swinbourne (last spotted at Nice Tech). Brian Leake and Mark Davidson, who briefly worked on-site during the development of Debut, followed their careers in the USA; Brian was last spotted at The Walt Disney Company in California, and Mark at Destineer in North Carolina.

Prolific freelance Interceptor programmers Richard Robinson & Keith Harvey (AKA 'Howlin' Mad', also known as 'Mirai') went on to form the multimedia futurist band "Intelligentsia" in Tokyo, and Earth Academy Records in London, both working in TV Media and the progressive arts.
