= Fragile Allegiance =

1996 real-time strategy video game

- Australian cover art of Fragile Allegiance
- Developer: Gremlin Interactive
- Publishers: Gremlin Interactive; Interplay Productions
- Designers: Cajji Software: Alex Metallis; Jon Medhurst; Chris Allan Mills; James Hartshorn Gremlin Interactive: Kim Blake
- Platforms: MS-DOS, Windows 95, Windows 98 and Windows Me
- Release: MS-DOS: EU: December 1996; NA: 1997; Windows 95: EU: December 1996; NA: March 15, 1997
- Genres: 4X, real-time strategy
- Modes: Single-player, multiplayer

Fragile Allegiance is an open-ended 4X real-time strategy (RTS) game from Gremlin Interactive, released in 1996 for MS-DOS and Windows 95. The game begins on May 25, 2496, as the player begins their employment with TetraCorp (a large interstellar megacorporation) who have set up a new asteroid mining franchise operation in the Fragmented Sectors. There are six alien races competing with Tetracorp for these resources. Beginning with one building and one million credits, the player is tasked with building up a successful mining operation to sell as much ore as possible to the Federation. Diplomacy is crucial to the success or failure of this franchise operation as the players' colonies begin to encroach on one another.

The game features complex diplomacy between players and includes real-time lip-synced animations for in-game actors. Described as a combination of SimCity 2000, Civilization and Risk, Fragile Allegiance uses an icon based GUI for all menus and game commands. Unlike other RTS games, there is no defined tech tree, with technology being unlocked by the purchase of 36 blueprints at any time during the course of the game. Fragile Allegiance is the spiritual successor to K240 and there are many similarities between the two.

Fragile Allegiance generally scored well with reviewers, with PC Gamer UK giving the game the Game of Distinction award and was praised for its graphics, interface and sound. The game has problems running on Windows XP and later Windows versions, as it was designed for MS-DOS and ported to Windows 95.

== Gameplay ==
Gameplay takes place in the Fragmented Sectors, an area of outer space filled with asteroids that are rich in mineral resources. The aim of the game is to colonise and mine the asteroids for the various ores found on them and then sell the ore to the Federation. The player can use the proceeds for empire expansion, purchasing new technologies, construction of buildings, ships and missiles, spying, trading and also to pay fines should the Federation impose any. Construction of the various missiles and ships requires quantities of different ores, so the decision to sell to the Federation is not straightforward. The game has a stock market where commodities can be bought and sold. There is also a black market offering unauthorised information regarding individual spies and colony supervisors, and illicit trade in rare ores and missiles. The manual states that any TetraCorp employee caught selling ore on the black market will be terminated.

The Asteroid View screen shows the currently selected asteroid's surface. Here, a player can place buildings, construct ships and missiles and also is the only screen where ore is able to be loaded onto the federal transporter for sale to the Federation.

Fragile Allegiance has a simplistic combat system with the player having no direct control over units when a fleet enters combat. Enemy asteroids can be attacked using ships, missiles and agents. During a battle, laser beams criss-cross the screen and buildings catch fire before being destroyed. Ground turrets fire back at attacking ships and anti-missile turrets shoot out incoming missiles.

Small ships are built in a shipyard while the larger ships require a space dock for construction. Ships range from the small Scoutship (used to discover new asteroids), to the gigantic Command Cruiser (which is used for transporting combat fleets over vast distances that they would otherwise be unable to travel without refueling). Each ship has a limited number of hardpoints to which weapons and other devices can be attached, and ships can be grouped together into fleets.

There are a total of seven races in the game, but only TetraCorp (representing the human race) is playable. Upon discovering an alien race, diplomacy can be initiated in order to arrange actions such as non-aggression pacts and joint-combat treaties, as well as accuse them of spying or trading with the Mauna (trading with the Mauna is illegal under Federation law). If a faction is found to be trading with the Mauna, Jane Fong (Federal minister for trade relations in addition to her role as Terran ambassador for the Fragmented Sectors) can be informed, who will in turn tell the Federation, which could result in increased hostility towards the offending faction from all others or, they can be threatened with blackmail and forced to pay a tribute in return for the players silence. Each race has a unique look and diplomatic strategies and everything happens in real time with highly detailed characters that are well animated and lip-synced. One of the factions—The Mauna—are not members of the Federation and are unable to be negotiated or traded with. As the player's empire expands, agents and supervisors will make themselves available for employment. Agents are used for gathering intelligence on alien asteroids and can also be deployed on the players own asteroids for counter-intelligence. Other uses for agents include deploying APV's and destroying various buildings such as defense installations, life support, production, and other various installations. The chances of an agent successfully completing their mission and escaping detection are increased if there is a spy satellite orbiting the asteroid they are assigned to. Colony Supervisors are able to be employed to help manage the building and maintenance of asteroid colonies. There is no research in the game, as this popular mechanic is replaced with the Sci-Tek blueprint system which allows players to buy new technologies as needed. Multiplayer is available over an IPX network with TetraCorp being the only playable race.

== Plot ==
The Asteroid Field View shows the entire game map. Here, a player can see all discovered asteroids and incoming enemy fleets and missiles. The icons to the right are the games user interface.

The player begins the game as the latest recruit to TetraCorp's mining franchise operation and is tasked with selling as much ore as possible to the Federation, which is a coalition of six of the seven known alien cultures: the Terrans, the Artemia, the Mikotaj, the Achean Gatherings, the Braccatia and the Rigellians. The Federation was inaugurated in 2439 following a coup deposing the last Terran Emperor Dramon Salaria in 2437 and was established to encourage commercial competition rather than full-scale wars between its constituent parties. The authority of the Federation is constantly challenged — in part by those who helped to create it, and the further away from the Federal center a person is, the less the Federation can influence their day-to-day lives. The seventh alien culture, the Mauna, are not members of the Federation and it is revealed in the game that they are an untrustworthy and cruel species. It is not known if the Mauna were consulted with prior to the creation of the Federation, and trading with the Mauna is frowned upon by the Federation.

Numerous megacorporations exist within the Federation and TetraCorp is one of the largest and oldest. Their sister company is Sci-Tek, which manufactures and supplies most of the technology that the player has access to. Sci-Tek also has blueprints for advanced technologies that the player can purchase. The opening cinematic plays like a corporate recruitment video and at one point is interrupted by a Terran male who tells the viewer that TetraCorp has a history of exploiting workers of all races and cultures with low pay and wretched working conditions. The movie is interrupted a second time by an Artemian who tells the player that Terran progression was responsible for 68% of all alien mortalities during the past three centuries and that the reason for this high percentage is due to megacorporations such as TetraCorp.

== Development ==
For the US market, the box art omits the dead colonist in the foreground and the nuclear fireball; other elements of the image have been rearranged.

Fragile Allegiance is essentially a remake of Gremlin Interactive's 1994 Amiga game K240, with the graphics and user interface revamped for the improved PC hardware available at the time. The core gameplay elements of K240 are retained; the game is set in an asteroid belt, the Sci-Tek blueprint system replaces research and the player is tasked with building up a successful mining operation. Many of the buildings, ships and missiles have the same names and functions as those in K240 and in both games there are six alien races competing against the player. The soundtrack for the game was composed by Patrick Phelan who also composed the soundtrack for K240. The game was released in 1996 and competed against other empire building titles such as Ascendancy and Master of Orion 2.

Fragile Allegiance was marketed as an intense deep space real-time strategy game complete with complex face-to-face diplomacy. It was the first game to use Gremlin Interactive's facial motion capture technology which allowed for highly detailed and realistic looking alien ambassadors, giving depth and adding atmosphere to the games diplomacy. Two versions of the game were released — a European version and a North American version, with each region having different box art. There were two different demo versions, one with audio and one without audio. A cheat code is available for the game and is entered slightly differently between the two versions. For the European version the code is "FRAGILE /cKim.Jon.fmsti", while "FRAGILE /c.Osiris.fmsti" must be entered for the North American version. These codes reward the player with decreased construction time, extra money, the ability to see all asteroids in play, the ability to change the game speed in-game and gives the player access to all of the information in the game.

Historically, people reported that Fragile Allegiance did not work properly on Windows XP and later Windows platforms, as the game was designed for MS-DOS and ported to Windows 95. The most common issues being reported are no audio, the game failing to start, and the game crashing when trying to rename anything, including saved games. As no patch was ever released for the game, people have had to use emulators such as VDMSound or DOSBox in order to get the game to function properly but it may still crash when trying to rename a saved game. The game is now however available for purchase from Steam and is packaged with a Dosbox build, making it compatible with Windows 7 and later versions of Windows.

== Reception ==
Reception

Aggregate score
Aggregator	Score
GameRankings	65%

Review scores
Publication	Score
GameSpot	6.2 out of 10
PC Gamer (UK)	91%
Gamezilla	75%

Fragile Allegiance was generally well received, achieving average to good scores from reviewers. It was praised for its graphics and icon driven interface which was considered slick and well integrated but a little confusing at first. Reviewers noted that after figuring out what all the icons did the game was immensely engrossing, with the player always having something to do. The game was criticised for its difficulty, its simplistic combat model, the time spent transporting ore between asteroids, and the large amount of micromanagement involved when the player's empire got large, although reviewers noted that the latter two could be countered by the "Ore Teleporter blueprint" and Colony Supervisors respectively. There were mixed feelings regarding the replacing of research with the Sci-Tek blueprint system, which meant that any blueprint could be bought in any order provided the player had the money to do so.

The game was also criticised for only having one playable race (TetraCorp). Despite these criticisms PC Gamer UK gave it the Game of Distinction award for Christmas of 1996 stating that the game takes a lot of work and concentration to play, but called the title a "completely engrossing", and awarded it a score of 91%. Users of internet gaming site GameSpot rated Fragile Allegiance significantly higher than the site reviewer, rating it 8.6/10. Gamezilla's review rated it at 75% while GameRankings gave the game a score of 65%.
