= Normality (video game) =

1996 video game

- Developer: Gremlin Interactive
- Publishers: EU: Gremlin Interactive; NA: Interplay Productions
- Producers: Adrian Carless; Mark Glossop
- Programmers: Graeme Ing; Antony Crowther
- Artists: Ricki Martin; Christian Russell; Jonathan Sandford
- Writer: Adrian Carless
- Composers: Chris Adams; Neil Biggin; Patrick Phelan
- Platforms: MS-DOS, Windows, macOS, Linux
- Release: June 1996
- Genre: Adventure
- Mode: Single-player

Normality is a 3D graphic adventure, released in June 1996 by Gremlin Interactive. All cut-scenes in the game are pre-rendered. The game's engine was later used in the game Realms of the Haunting. It was re-released in 2011 with Microsoft Windows support on GOG.com, with macOS support following in 2013 and Linux support in 2014.

== Plot ==
The story revolves around Kent Knutson, a rebellious slacker in the city of Neutropolis, where various places take up the setting of the game. Neutropolis, a once thriving and vibrant city, is now a dark and polluted police state where any kind of fun is prohibited. When the game begins, Kent is released after having been imprisoned by the "Norms", the city's police force, for whistling a happy tune while walking down the street. While in prison, he receives a note from an anonymous inmate telling him about the underground insurrection group that he might want to join.

After being released from jail, the player starts the game in Kent's apartment, having to find and join this resistance group. After winning the trust of the resistance group, Kent must assist them in overthrowing the dictator Paul who is responsible for the city's sorry state, where his twin brother Saul was rumored to be dead because of him.

== Release ==
Normality was self-published in the United Kingdom by Gremlin Interactive. It had a small credited voice cast. Interplay handled publishing duties in the United States and decided to entirely replace the voice cast with a broader range of actors that it felt would appeal more to the US market. This included casting Corey Feldman in the role of the main character, with Charlie Adler, Mary Kay Bergman, S. Scott Bullock, Howard Morris, Phil Proctor, Kevin Michael Richardson, and Neil Ross in supporting roles.

== Reception ==
Reception

Review scores
Publication	Score
Computer Games Strategy Plus	3.5/5
Edge	7/10
Next Generation	3/5
PC Gamer (US)	80%
Maximum	3/5
PC Games	B−

Reviewing the game in Maximum, Rich Leadbetter praised the rendered intro, the believability of the 3D environment, the setting, and the user-friendly interface, while criticizing the dull scenario and repetitive speech. He concluded, "Although technically innovative and visually impressive, this one is for adventure fans only." A reviewer for Next Generation said the free roaming, real-time 3D environment is an impressive change of pace for the adventure genre, but feels incongruous in light of the fact that the game does not allow any interaction beyond what is traditionally seen in adventure games. He complimented the puzzles as being logical and not overly difficult, but said veteran adventure gamers might find them too easy because of that. He summarized the game as "at least mildly fun and entertaining."

Scorpia of Computer Gaming World had a generally favorable opinion of Normality, although she disliked its load times and certain interface bugs. She summarized, "Overall, though, Normality isn't bad."
