= Plan 9 from Outer Space (video game) =

1992 video game

- Developer: Gremlin Graphics
- Publishers: Gremlin Graphics (Europe); Konami (US)
- Platforms: Amiga, Atari ST, MS-DOS
- Release: 1992
- Genre: Adventure
- Mode: Single-player

Plan 9 from Outer Space is a point and click adventure game inspired by the 1957 Z movie of the same name. It was developed at the Irish office of Gremlin Graphics for the Amiga and Atari ST and published in 1992 by Gremlin in Europe and Konami in the United States. An MS-DOS version was also released. There are two editions of the game: the more common version is packaged with a VHS copy of the film, while a rarer version contains only the game.

== Plot ==
The game starts when the producer notices that the film has been stolen by Bela Lugosi's double. The player must carry out an epic search of the locations where Plan 9 from Outer Space was filmed to find the six missing reels.

From the back of the MS-DOS version box:

Plan 9. The critics hated it. Bela Lugosi died during it. And his double has stolen it.

Lugosi's replacement is still bitter after 33 years from critics' reviews dubbing his only movie "The Worst Film of All-Time". Even though he remained faceless, he intends to bring glory to the cult classic using more footage of himself and ... colorizing it. As the studio's Private Eye you'll search over 70 locations, find the 6 reels and screen the film, frame-by-frame, to ensure that the warped actor did not cut Bela from the flick. Using actual digitized film footage, you'll sweat each scene, examining Plan 9 with slow motion, freeze frame, fast forward and rewind. It's up to you to preserve its original awfulness.

== Reception ==
Computer Gaming World's Charles Ardai criticized the game's "cheap" user interface and mediocre graphics and sound, which made him uncertain whether various continuity errors were accidental or intended to satirize the film. Ardai stated that "Plan 9 is a genuinely, intentionally funny piece of work, which puts it several notches above the movie (in my opinion) ... thoroughly enjoyable", and funnier than Zak McKracken and the Alien Mindbenders. He added, however, that as "a licensed product, parasitic on an original work ... its smirking digs at this rather pathetic relic of a movie ... sometimes has the tone of a schoolyard bully taking cheap shots at a defenseless victim". Without the sincerity and "guilelessness" of Wood's film: "In this respect, the game attains a degree of cheapness that even the movie didn't reach, which is quite an accomplishment". The game was reviewed in 1993 in Dragon #190 by Hartley, Patricia, and Kirk Lesser in "The Role of Computers" column. The reviewers gave the game 2 out of 5 stars.
