= Hardwar (video game) =

1998 video game

- European cover art
- Developer(s): The Software Refinery
- Publisher(s): EU: Gremlin Interactive; NA: Interplay Productions
- Producer(s): Adrian Carless
- Designer(s): Mark Griffiths; Ciaran Gultnieks; Ian Martin
- Programmer(s): Tim Heaton
- Artist(s): Les Spink
- Writer(s): Adrian Carless; Alan Coltman
- Platform(s): PC (Windows/DirectX 5)
- Release: September 11, 1998
- Genre(s): Flight simulation
- Mode(s): Single-player; Multiplayer over serial, TCP/IP or DirectPlay

Hardwar (sometimes stylized HardW[a]r or given the full name Hardwar: The Future Is Greedy) is a 1998 science fiction flight simulation computer game developed by The Software Refinery and published by Gremlin Interactive. In the US, the game was distributed by Interplay under license. The box artwork and styling for game was created by The Designers Republic, who also worked on the Wipeout series. The soundtrack was provided by artists signed to the Warp Records label. Funbox Media digitally re-released Hardwar via ZOOM-Platform.com on September 17, 2021. Funbox Media and Jordan Freeman Group, the aforementioned ZOOM-Platform.com, would team up again to release a Steam (service) version on February 15, 2023. The Steam (service) edition remained DRM-Free.

The game's plot involves warring power groups on Titan, and the player character's eventual escape. The world is set inside craters on the moon's surface, joined together by a network of tunnels.

== Story ==
Hardwar places the player in the role of a freelance "Moth" pilot in the city of Misplaced Optimism, a space colony located on Saturn's moon, Titan. The colony was once a profitable mining outpost, but the major corporations backed out, leaving the inhabitants without the capability of space travel and a slowly but steadily crumbling infrastructure. During two hundred years of isolation, the remaining corporations became effectively organised crime gangs, with the corrupt and inefficient police force maintaining little law and order.

Things change when an unidentified, apparently alien, ship crash lands in the defunct Port district, causing the two largest corporations - Klamp-G and Lazarus - to rush to take advantage. The player finds themself thrust in to the situation, eventually managing to outrace both corporations to help the aliens repair their ship in return for passage off Titan, to an uncertain, but hopefully better, future.

== Gameplay ==
It is at the discretion of the players as to how they will earn their living on Titan. They can trade honestly, having to be wary of pirates. They can choose to hunt Titan's outlaws, collecting bounties from the various police stations. Players may also be lowly scavengers like many artificial intelligence (AI) moths, picking at the dropped cargo of panicked traders, or players can become pirates themselves.

Many AI moths flit about with valuable cargo, should the players decide to take this path; however, stolen cargo in the players' hands can be confiscated by the police, or they could become the target of other outlaws now that they are carrying valuable cargo. Players may attract the unwelcome attention of one of the main factions in the game due to their piracy.

Players are able to buy many of the available hangars around Titan, making storage of goods and repairs much simpler. This also allows them to store extra "Moths" safely in one location, to set up trade facilities in different craters, and purchase and install Clones, to ensure the players' continuance should they meet an untimely demise in the skies.

Alternatively, players can use a public hangar, such as one of the various businesses around the city to trade and repair their moths.

Players are able to trade goods from their hangar(s), and based on market forces such as supply and demand, as well as distance to the supply, players can set their own prices. Based on how good a deal the players make, AI moths will line up in droves to purchase goods, or fly on by for a better deal elsewhere.

Players can set up manufacturing facilities in their hangars with the purchase of relevant equipment, to turn scrap metal into ship parts, to turn water and chemicals into alcohol, or any number of other products.

== Development ==
Hardwar was originally scheduled for a 1996 release. Hardwar was developed by The Software Refinery and published in 1998 by Gremlin Interactive. In the US, the game was distributed by Interplay. The box artwork and styling for game was created by The Designers Republic, who also worked on the Wipeout series. The music was provided by artists signed to Warp Records. Gremlin's Mark Mattocks said that it was not a coincidence that Gremlin, Warp, and The Designer's Republic were all companies based in Sheffield: "The angle is that this is a collaboration between Sheffield, U.K. companies that are at the top of their industries. We've wanted to work with Warp for a long time, so we looked at two or three projects and picked Hardwar."

Software Refinery was located in the north of England at Leeds, and several locations in the game were named after actual buildings near the company's offices. Hardwar's designer and producer, Ade Carless, plays the Police "uber-clerk" in several FMV clips, with the GMTV presenter Ben Shephard playing the important role of "Syd".

In reference to the movie Hackers, four of the pilots on the police wanted list are called "Zero Cool", "Acid Burn", "Lord Nikon" and "Crash Override".

As The Software Refinery went into voluntary liquidation in 2002, Hardwar is no longer officially supported by its developers and the game has not been officially patched or modified since. However, Ian Martin, one of the game's developers, did release a series of unofficial patches to the fan community to add additional features and bug fixes not present in the final official release.

== Reception ==
Reception

Review scores
Publication	Score
Computer and Video Games	4/5
GameStar	58%
PC Zone	85/100
PC Player (DE)	66/100

Ed Lomas of Computer and Video Games summarized: "Hardwar has a brilliant atmosphere, lots to do, and a great sense of freedom. Just make sure you can put up with the first few slow hours."

Paul Presley of PC Zone said: "In many ways, Hardwar is half a game. Or to be precise, half of another, much larger game. If this were the engine driving the ground-based sections of something like, for want of a more recent example, Elite, then we'd probably be looking at the ultimate game here."
