= Fatal Racing =

1995 video game

- Cover art
- Developer: Gremlin Interactive
- Publishers: EU: Gremlin Interactive; NA: Interplay Productions
- Designers: Les Spink; Ade Carless
- Composer: Neil Biggin
- Engine: Custom
- Platform: MS-DOS
- Release: EU: October 30, 1995; NA: January 31, 1996
- Genre: Racing
- Modes: Single-player, multiplayer

Fatal Racing, known as Whiplash in North America, is a 3D stunt car racing video game developed and published by Gremlin Interactive in Europe in 1995 for MS-DOS, and published in 1996 by Interplay Productions in North America.

In Fatal Racing the player picks among a broad selection of cars and drives through tracks with loops, corkscrews, and jumps while trying to smash into other cars to destroy them and at the same time cross the finish line first. There is a variety of different camera views available in the game, "in-car", chase-cam, etc. Multiplayer is supported by IPX/SPX network and modem, in addition, a split screen option is also available. Fatal Racing supports graphics resolutions of 320×200 and 640×480, the latter being very demanding on the hardware available at the time of the game's release. The game also runs in a 16:10 aspect ratio and not the more common 4:3 aspect ratio at the time.

== Release ==
Later, there was an enhanced 3dfx Glide version of the game made. This was bundled with some Voodoo Cards as Fatal Racing 3D. This enhanced version is hardware specific, and it requires a Voodoo I graphics card to function correctly. There were also patches available for the original versions of the game to add support for 3D graphics cards such as the Rendition Verite and the S3 ViRGE.

== Music ==
Fatal Racing has audio CD tracks for a realistic music performance. It can be chosen as a music option in the Sound and Music setup program. This was used to replace low-quality MIDI choices. While the title, race victory, and championship victory tracks are high-quality versions of their respective MIDI equivalents, the menu track and in-game tracks are completely different on the CD. The audio and the sound effects (featuring the 9 songs) were produced by Neil Biggin.

== Reception ==
A reviewer for Next Generation applauded the game's inventive and challenging tracks, numerous cars to choose from, and network options. He noted that the game's high resolution mode runs poorly even on a Pentium 133, but said the game overall compares favorably to games like The Need for Speed and Screamer, and gave it 4 out of 5 stars.

== Cancelled sequel ==
A sequel, tentatively titled Whiplash 2, was included on Hyper magazine's list of "Confirmed Dreamcast Titles in Development" in 1999, though no such title was ever released.
