= Into the Eagle's Nest =

1987 video game

- North American box art
- Developer: Pandora
- Publishers: Pandora; Mindscape; Atari Corporation
- Producer: Richard Paul Jones
- Programmer: Andrew Challis
- Artist: Robin Chapman
- Composer: Keith Harvey
- Platforms: Amiga, Amstrad CPC, Apple II, Atari 8-bit, Atari ST, Commodore 64, MS-DOS, ZX Spectrum
- Release: 1987
- Genre: Stealth
- Mode: Single-player

Into the Eagle's Nest is a video game developed by Pandora and published in 1987 for Amiga, Amstrad CPC, Apple II, Atari ST, Commodore 64, IBM PC compatibles, and ZX Spectrum. Atari Corporation also released a cartridge version for the Atari 8-bit computers in the style of the Atari XEGS.

== Plot ==
The player has found the key (Atari ST screenshot)

Into the Eagle's Nest is a game in which the player character is an Allied soldier who must infiltrate the four castles that comprise the top-secret Nazi fortress known as the Eagle's Nest. The goal is to rescue three Allied saboteurs being held in three of the castles, recover the art treasures stolen by the Nazis, and then use explosives to destroy the fourth castle.

== Gameplay ==
The player uses a joystick for control, using the firing button to shoot the machine gun, which carries ammunition to allow for 99 shots. Nazis are killed when hit by two well-placed shots, although Nazis sitting at a table are killed with a single well-placed shot. The player can survive up to 50 shots from Nazi soldiers. Inside the castles, the player can discover crates which may contain art objects or explosives. The player can also find ammunition dumps, first-aid kits, and food in the castles.

== Release ==
The game was originally programmed by Andrew Challis for the Commodore 64, and by Kevin Parker for the Amiga, Amstrad CPC, Atari ST, and ZX Spectrum, with graphics by Robin Chapman for all formats. It was initially released in 1987 by Pandora in the United Kingdom. The game was also licensed by Mindscape for release in the United States, who handled the Apple II port by Andrew Pines and IBM PC compatible port by Visionware.

In 1988, Atari Corporation published a cartridge version for the Atari 8-bit computers as part of the Atari XEGS release line-up.

The game was subsequently re-released at a budget price of £1.99 by Players Software, under the shortened title Eagles Nest for some versions. The re-release received further coverage in the British gaming press in 1989.

== Reception ==
Reception

Awards
Publication	Award
Sinclair User	SU Classic
Your Sinclair	Megagame

Compute! called Into the Eagle's Nest "a good, solid arcade game", but criticized it for not allowing progress to be saved during most of the game, and stated that receiving points for killing drunken, unconscious Nazi soldiers seemed like "cold-blooded murder". The game was reviewed in 1987 in Dragon #128 by Hartley, Patricia, and Kirk Lesser in "The Role of Computers" column. The reviewers gave the game 4 out of 5 stars.

Tracie Forman Hines reviewed the game for Computer Gaming World, and stated "Into the Eagle's Nest was some of the best fun this jaded critic has had in ages and it is a game that most people will go back to time after time. Strategic shootout fans will find this one a blast."

A 1991 Computer Gaming World survey of strategy and war games gave it two and a half stars out of five, stating that it was "fun for a short time, but rapidly loses its interest appeal".

The game also achieved commercial success in the United Kingdom, reaching fourth place on the Commodore 64 Gallup software chart for the period ending in early May 1987. It reached tenth place on the combined-format chart later that month. The budget re-release was also positively received, earning 8 out of 10 from Your Sinclair in March 1989 and 91% from Crash in May 1989, with both publications highlighting its value for money.
