= Super Pipeline =

1983 video game

- Publisher: Taskset
- Designer: Andy Walker
- Composer: Paul Hodgson
- Platform: Commodore 64
- Release: 1983
- Genre: Puzzle
- Modes: Single-player, multiplayer

Super Pipeline is a puzzle video game written by Andy Walker for the Commodore 64 and published by Taskset in 1983. The objective is to keep a series of pipes unblocked so that water may flow through them. It was followed by Super Pipeline II by the same author in 1985.

== Gameplay ==
Enemies include saboteurs that plug up the pipes, bugs that fall from the ceiling to kill the player, and a monster that patrols the pipe in later levels. The player is armed with a gun that can kill bugs, saboteurs, as well as the monster (but only from behind), and is followed by a helper that can remove plugs and kill the smaller bugs. In later levels, a series of walls protect the enemies as they climb the ladder on the right towards the roof. A level ends when a set amount of water enters the barrel at the end of the pipe.

== Reception ==
Super Pipeline was placed at number 29 in the first issue of Zzap!64's top 64 games list.
