= Venus the Flytrap =

1990 video game

- Developer(s): Gremlin Graphics
- Publisher(s): Gremlin Graphics
- Platform(s): Amiga, Atari ST
- Release: 1990
- Genre(s): Side-scrolling
- Mode(s): Single-player

Venus the Flytrap is a post-apocalyptic side-scrolling video game released in 1990 by Gremlin Graphics for the Amiga and Atari ST.

== Reception ==
Reception

Review score
Publication	Score
Amiga Joker	87%

Michael Labiner wrote in Amiga Joker magazine: "Who has tried Venus remains stuck on the fly trap. [...] Gremlin has created an absolute top game [...]"
