= Denizen (video game) =

1988 video game

- Developers: Paul Griffiths, Mike Brown, Martin Severn, Andrew Severn
- Publisher: Players Software
- Platform: ZX Spectrum
- Release: 1988
- Genre: Action
- Mode: Single player

Denizen is an action computer game published by Players Software in 1988 for the ZX Spectrum.

== Gameplay ==
Denizen is a science-fiction, action, flip-screen maze game, with a top-down perspective. The player controls a marine, with the aim of detonating twenty explosive bolts on each of three levels. The marine is armed with a rifle and is initially supplied with 99 bullets. The player can only move up and down (not diagonally), in half-tile steps. Each screen may contain one or more enemies, who move toward the marine in a straight line until they reach an obstacle. The enemies attack the player merely by contact, draining the character's health in a manner similar to Gauntlet. Each enemy requires two bullets to destroy them.

Health is regenerated by returning to the marine's start point on each level. If he is out of ammunition, this also supplies him with a single bullet. Items that can be collected include single-use keycards to open locked doors, ammunition and a torch which allows better vision in dark areas.

== Reception ==
Denizen received poor reviews, with criticism being levelled at the slow character movement. The weapon firing mechanism was a particular complaint; "The self-loading 'Quick Kill' rifle... is anything but quick", "[The rifle] acts in the manner of an aerosol gun, two slow puffs and off goes yer fly". The gameplay itself was described as a "dull maze plod" with unresponsive and repetitive action.

However, all the reviewers highlighted the colourful, detailed graphics, with presentation comparable with Players' previous titles.
