= List of Destination Software games =

This is a list of video games published, developed and/or distributed by Destination Software.

== 0-9 ==
- 1 vs. 100 (2008) Nintendo DS

== A ==
- The Aly & AJ Adventure (2007) Nintendo DS
- Arctic Tale (2007) Game Boy Advance, Nintendo DS, Wii
- ATV: Thunder Ridge Riders (2006) Game Boy Advance
- ATV: Thunder Ridge Riders / Monster Trucks Mayhem (2008) Nintendo DS

== B ==
- B-17: Fortress in the Sky (2007) Nintendo DS
- Baldur's Gate: Dark Alliance (2004) Game Boy Advance
- Balls of Fury (2007) Nintendo DS, Wii
- Barnyard Blast: Swine of the Night (2008) Nintendo DS
- Battleship/Connect Four/Sorry!/Trouble (2006) Nintendo DS
- Betty Boop's Double Shift (2007) Nintendo DS
- Big Mutha Truckers (2005) Game Boy Advance, Nintendo DS
- Board Game Classics (2005) Game Boy Advance

== C ==
- CandyLand / Chutes & Ladders / Memory (2005) Game Boy Advance
- Centipede / Breakout / Warlords (2005) Game Boy Advance
- Championship Pony (2008) Nintendo DS
- Chess Crusade (2008) Nintendo DS, Nintendo Wii
- Chicken Shoot (2007) Nintendo DS, Nintendo Wii
- Chicken Shoot 1 (2005) Game Boy Advance
- Chicken Shoot 2 (2005) Game Boy Advance
- Clue / Mouse Trap / Perfection / Aggravation (2007) Nintendo DS
- Command and Destroy (2008) Nintendo DS
- Connect Four / Perfection / Trouble (2005) Game Boy Advance

== D ==
- Deal or No Deal (2007) Game Boy Advance, Nintendo DS
- Double Sequence: The Q-Virus Invasion (2008) Nintendo DS
- Dr. Seuss: How The Grinch Stole Christmas! (2007) Nintendo DS

== F ==
- F1 2002 (2002) Game Boy Advance
- Ford Racing 3 (2005) Game Boy Advance, Nintendo DS
- Freekstyle (2003) Game Boy Advance
- Frisbee Disc Freestyle / Frisbee Disc Golf (2007) Game Boy Advance, Nintendo DS

== G ==
- The Game of Life/Yahtzee/Payday (2005) Game Boy Advance
- Garfield Gets Real (2009) Nintendo DS, Wii
- Garfield's Fun Fest (2008) Nintendo DS
- Gauntlet / Rampart (2005) Game Boy Advance
- Gekido Advance: Kintaro's Revenge (2003) Game Boy Advance

== H ==
- Harlem Globetrotters: World Tour (2006) Game Boy Advance, Nintendo DS
- Hot Wheels: All Out (2006) Game Boy Advance
- Hot Wheels: Stunt Track Challenge / World Race (2006) Game Boy Advance
- Hot Wheels Ultimate Racing (2007) PlayStation Portable

== J ==
- Jeep Thrills (2008) Wii, PlayStation 2

== K ==
- KerPlunk / Toss Across / Tip It (2006) Game Boy Advance
- Kien (2004) Game Boy Advance
- Kill Switch (2004) Game Boy Advance
- Killer 3D Pool (2005) Game Boy Advance

== L ==
- Lionel Trains On Track (2006) Nintendo DS

== M ==
- M&M's Break' Em (2007) Game Boy Advance, Nintendo DS
- M&M's Kart Racing (2007) Nintendo DS, Wii
- Marble Madness / Klax (2005) Game Boy Advance
- March of the Penguins (2006) Game Boy Advance, Nintendo DS
- Matchbox Missions: Air, Land & Sea Rescue / Emergency Response (2006) Game Boy Advance
- Medal of Honor: Underground (2002) Game Boy Advance
- Midnight Club: Street Racing (2001) Game Boy Advance
- Millipede / Super Breakout / Lunar Lander (2005) Game Boy Advance
- Monopoly (2004) Game Boy Advance
- Monster Trucks Mayhem (2006) Game Boy Advance
- Mouse Trap / Operation / Simon (2005) Game Boy Advance
- Ms. Pac-Man Maze Madness (2004) Game Boy Advance
- Ms. Pac-Man Maze Madness / Pac-Man World (2005) Game Boy Advance

== N ==
- Need for Speed: Porsche Unleashed (2004) Game Boy Advance

== O ==
- Original Frisbee Disc Sports: Ultimate & Golf (2007) Nintendo DS

== P ==
- Pac-Man Pinball Advance (2005) Game Boy Advance
- Pac-Man World (2004) Game Boy Advance
- Pac-Man World 2 (2005) Game Boy Advance
- Paperboy / Rampage (2005) Game Boy Advance
- Payback (2004) Game Boy Advance
- Polly Pocket: Super Splash Island (2003) Game Boy Advance
- Pong / Asteroids / Yar's Revenge (2005) Game Boy Advance
- Princess Natasha: Student, Secret Agent, Princess (2006) Game Boy Advance, Nintendo DS

== R ==
- R-Type III: The Third Lightning (2004) Game Boy Advance
- Risk / Battleship / Clue (2005) Game Boy Advance
- Road Rash: Jailbreak (2003) Game Boy Advance
- Rock 'Em Sock 'Em Robots (2006) Game Boy Advance

== S ==
- Scrabble Blast! (2005) Game Boy Advance
- Sea Monsters: A Prehistoric Adventure (2007) Nintendo DS, Wii, PlayStation 2
- Shining Stars: Super Starcade (2008) Nintendo DS
- Showtime Championship Boxing (2007) Nintendo DS, Wii
- SimCity 2000 (2003) Game Boy Advance
- Smashing Drive (2004) Game Boy Advance
- Smuggler's Run (2002) Game Boy Advance
- Snood (2001) Game Boy Advance
- Snood 2: On Vacation (2005) Game Boy Advance, Nintendo DS
- Sorry! / Aggravation / Scrabble Junior (2005) Game Boy Advance
- Spy Hunter / Super Sprint (2005) Game Boy Advance
- Street Jam Basketball (2004) Game Boy Advance

== T ==
- Tiger Woods PGA Tour Golf (2002) Game Boy Advance

== U ==
- Uno 52 (2006) Game Boy Advance, Nintendo DS
- Uno Free Fall (2007) Game Boy Advance
- Uno / Skip-Bo (2006) Game Boy Advance
- Uno/Skip-Bo/Uno Freefall (2006) Nintendo DS

== W ==
- Wade Hixton's Counter Punch (2004) Game Boy Advance
- Wiffle Ball (2007) Nintendo DS
- Wing Commander: Prophecy (2003) Game Boy Advance

== Y ==
- Yamaha Supercross (2008) Nintendo DS, Wii, PlayStation 2, Windows
