= Jeep =

American automobile brand

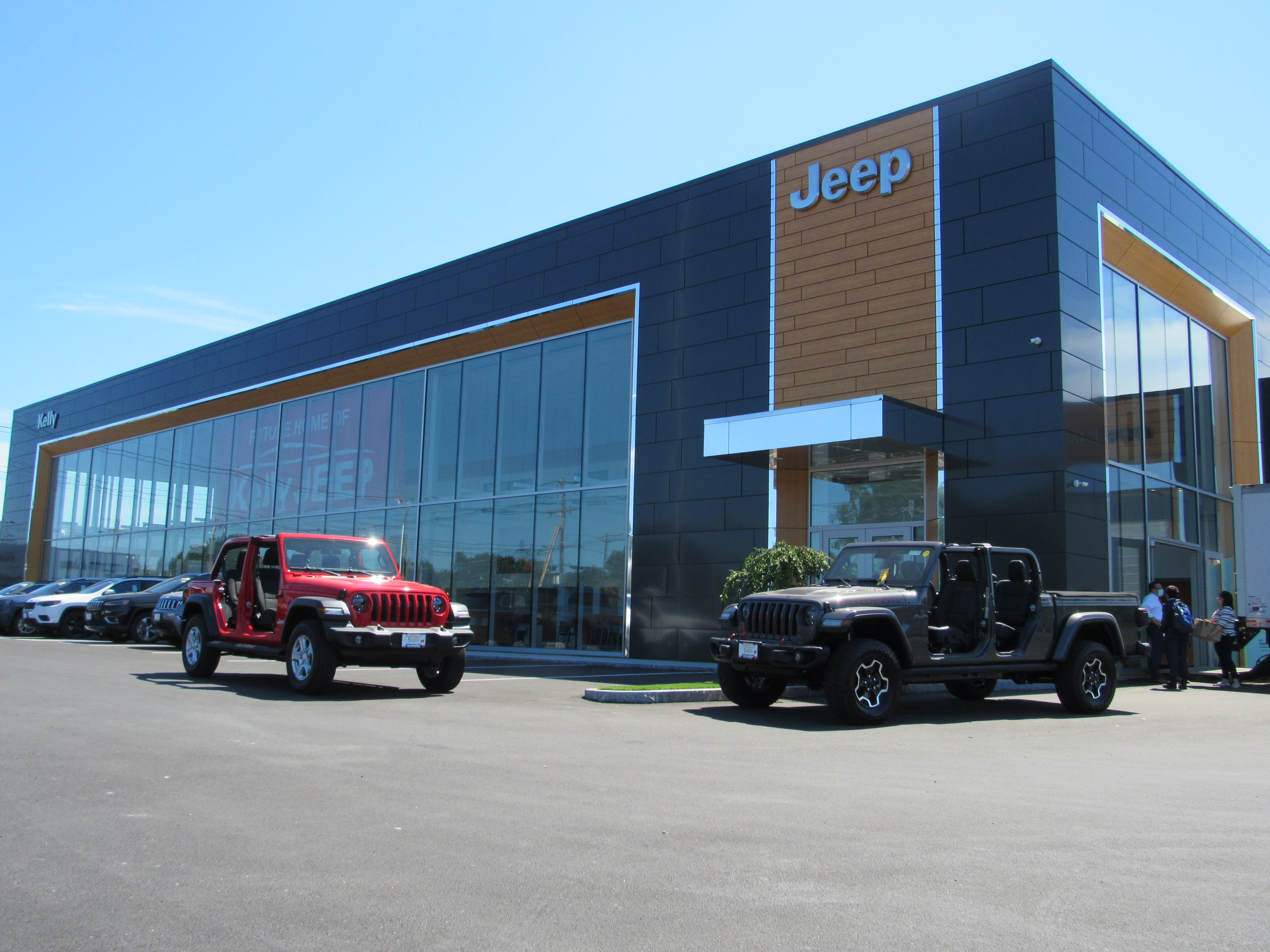
- Jeep dealership in Lynn, Massachusetts (2020)
- Product type: Sport utility vehicles; Luxury vehicles
- Current owner: Stellantis North America
- Country: U.S.
- Introduced: 1943; 83 years ago (trademark application); 1945; 81 years ago (first Jeep-branded product launched)
- Related brands: Willys MB
- Markets: Worldwide (Note: Except Cuba, Syria, Iran, North Korea, and Sudan.)
- Previous owners: Willys–Overland Motors (1945–1953); Kaiser Jeep (1953–1970); American Motors (1970–1987)
- Ambassadors: Branden Coté, Jeep Brand CEO
- Website: jeep.com

Jeep is an American automobile brand, now owned by multi-national corporation Stellantis. Jeep is part of Chrysler, who acquired the Jeep brand, along with other assets, from its previous owner, American Motors Corporation (AMC), in 1987.

Jeep's current product range consists solely of sport utility vehicles—both crossovers and fully off-road worthy SUVs and models, including one pickup truck. Previously, Jeep's range included other pick-ups, small vans, as well as a few roadsters. Some of Jeep's vehicles—such as the Grand Cherokee—reach into the luxury SUV segment, a market segment the 1963 Wagoneer is considered to have started. Jeep sold 1.4 million SUVs globally in 2016, up from 500,000 in 2008, two-thirds of which in North America, and was Fiat-Chrysler's best selling brand in the U.S. during the first half of 2017. In the U.S. alone, over 2400 dealerships hold franchise rights to sell Jeep-branded vehicles, and if Jeep were spun off into a separate company, it is estimated to be worth between $22 and $33.5 billion—slightly more than all of FCA (US).

Prior to 1940 the term "jeep" had been used as U.S. Army slang for new recruits or vehicles, but the World War II "jeep" that went into production in 1941 specifically tied the name to this light military 4×4, arguably making them the oldest four-wheel drive mass-production vehicles now known as SUVs. The Jeep became the primary light four-wheel-drive vehicle of the United States Armed Forces and the Allies during World War II, as well as the postwar period. The term became common worldwide in the wake of the war. Doug Stewart noted: "The spartan, cramped, and unstintingly functional jeep became the ubiquitous World War II four-wheeled personification of Yankee ingenuity and cocky, can-do determination." It is the precursor of subsequent generations of military light utility vehicles such as the Humvee, and inspired the creation of civilian analogs such as the original Series I Land Rover. Many Jeep variants serving similar military and civilian roles have since been designed in other nations.

The Jeep marque has been headquartered in Toledo, Ohio, ever since Willys–Overland launched production of the first CJ or Civilian Jeep branded models there in 1945. Its replacement, the conceptually consistent Jeep Wrangler series, has remained in production since 1986. With its solid axles and open top, the Wrangler has been called the Jeep model that is as central to the brand's identity as the 911 is to Porsche.

At least two Jeep models (the CJ-5 and the SJ Wagoneer) enjoyed extraordinary three-decade production runs of a single body generation.

In lowercase, the term "jeep" continues to be used as a generic term for vehicles inspired by the Jeep that are suitable for use on rough terrain. In Iceland, the word Jeppi (derived from Jeep) has been used since World War II and is still used for any type of SUV.

Jeep's product lineup in North America by 2030 will include the Wrangler, Gladiator, Scrambler, Compass, Cherokee, Recon, Grand Cherokee, and Grand Wagoneer.

== World War II ==
=== Development – 1. Bantam Reconnaissance Car ===
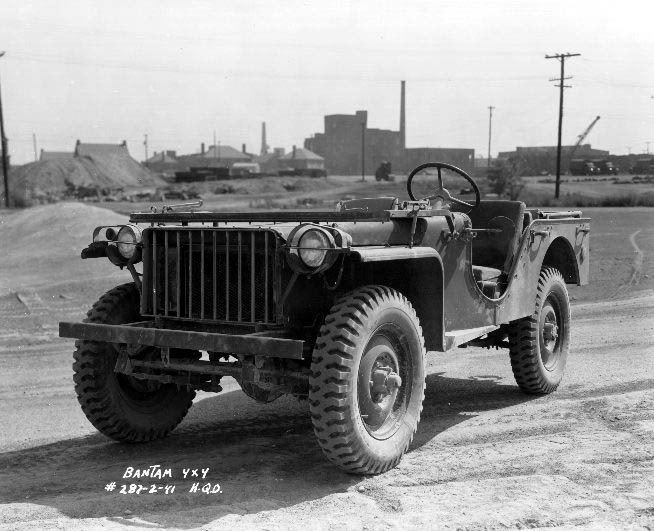
Bantam's BRC 40, pictured in 1941

When it became clear that the United States would be involved in the European theater of World War II, the Army contacted 135 companies to create working prototypes of a four-wheel drive reconnaissance car. Only two companies responded: the American Bantam Car Company and Willys-Overland. The Army set a seemingly impossible deadline of 49 days to supply a working prototype. Willys asked for more time, but was refused. American Bantam had only a small staff with nobody to draft the vehicle plans, so chief engineer Harold Crist hired Karl Probst, a talented freelance designer from Detroit. After turning down Bantam's initial request, Probst responded to an Army request and began work on July 17, 1940, initially without salary.

Probst drafted the full plans in just two days for the Bantam prototype known as the BRC or Bantam Reconnaissance Car, working up a cost estimate the next day. Bantam's bid was submitted on July 22, complete with blueprints. Much of the vehicle could be assembled from off-the-shelf automotive parts, and custom four-wheel drivetrain components were to be supplied by Spicer. The hand-built prototype was completed in Butler, Pennsylvania and driven to Camp Holabird, Maryland on September 23 for Army testing. The vehicle met all the Army's criteria except engine torque.

=== Development – 2. Willys and Ford ===
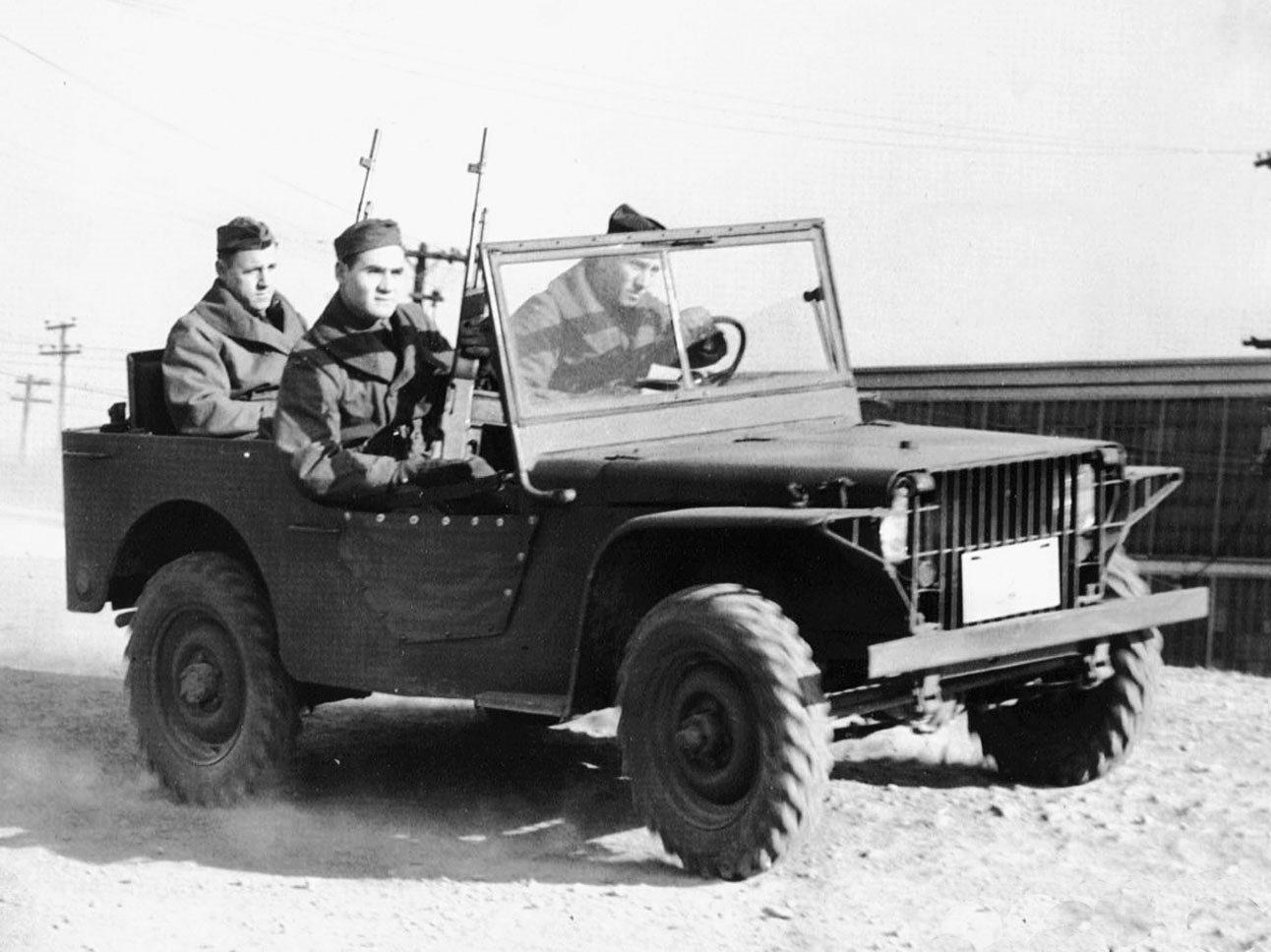
Ford Pygmy during testing at Camp Holabird, Maryland (c. 1940)

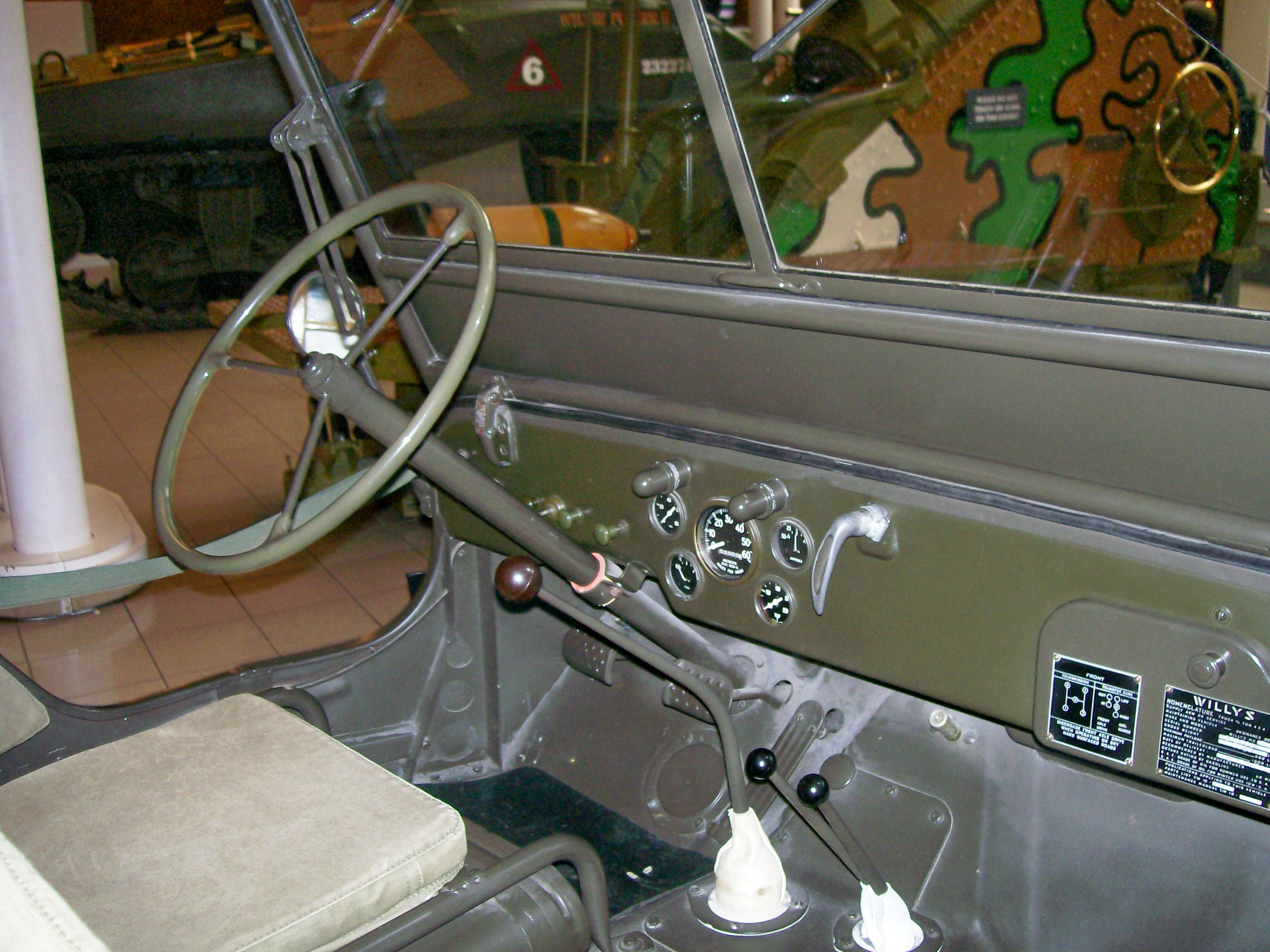
Dashboard of World War II era jeep in Imperial War Museum (2007)

The Army thought that the Bantam company lacked the production capacity to manufacture and deliver the required number of vehicles, so it supplied the Bantam design to Willys and Ford, and encouraged them to enhance the design. The resulting Ford "Pygmy" and Willys "Quad" prototypes looked very similar to the Bantam BRC prototype, and Spicer supplied very similar four-wheel drivetrain components to all three manufacturers.

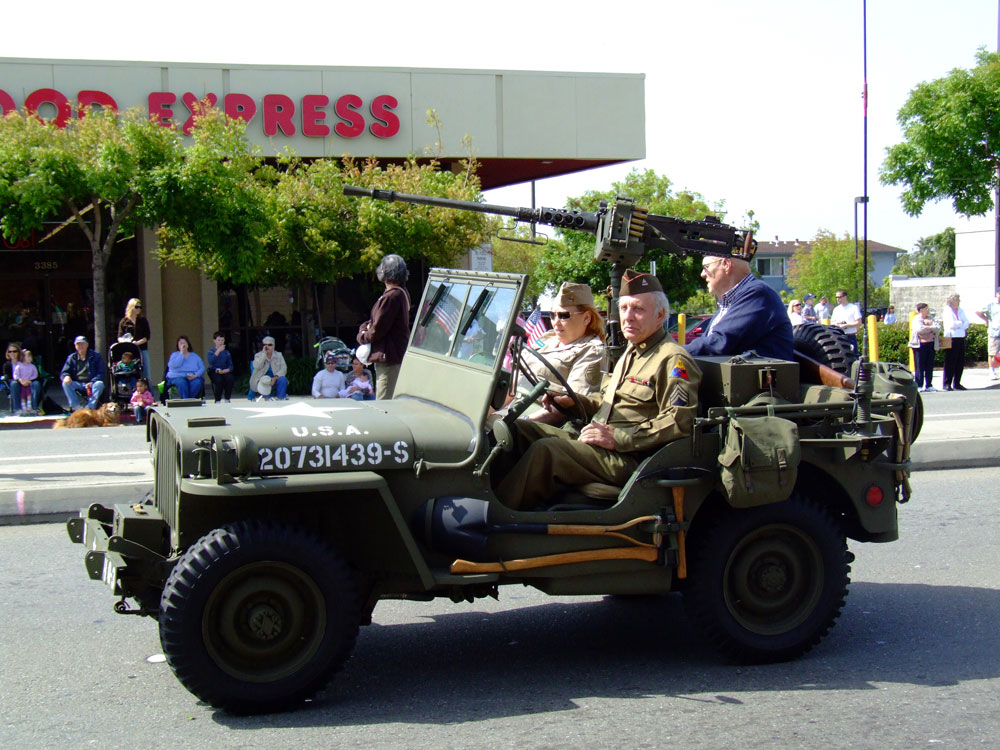
Jeep with 50 cal. Browning machine gun (2008)

1,500 of each model (Bantam BRC-40, Ford GP, and Willys MA) were built and extensively field-tested. After the weight specification was revised from 1,275 lb (578 kg) to a maximum of 2,450 lb (1,110 kg) including oil and water, Willys-Overland's chief engineer Delmar "Barney" Roos modified the design to use Willys's heavy but powerful "Go Devil" engine, and won the initial production contract. The Willys version became the standard jeep design, designated the model MB, and was built at their plant in Toledo, Ohio. The familiar pressed-metal Jeep grille was a Ford design feature and incorporated in the final design by the Army.

Because the US War Department required a large number of vehicles in a short time, Willys-Overland granted the US Government a non-exclusive license to allow another company to manufacture vehicles using Willys' specifications. The Army chose Ford as a second supplier, building Jeeps to Willys' design. Willys supplied Ford with a complete set of plans and specifications. American Bantam, the creators of the first Jeep, built approximately 2,700 of them to the BRC-40 design, but spent the rest of the war building heavy-duty trailers for the Army.

=== Full production – Willys MB and Ford GPW ===
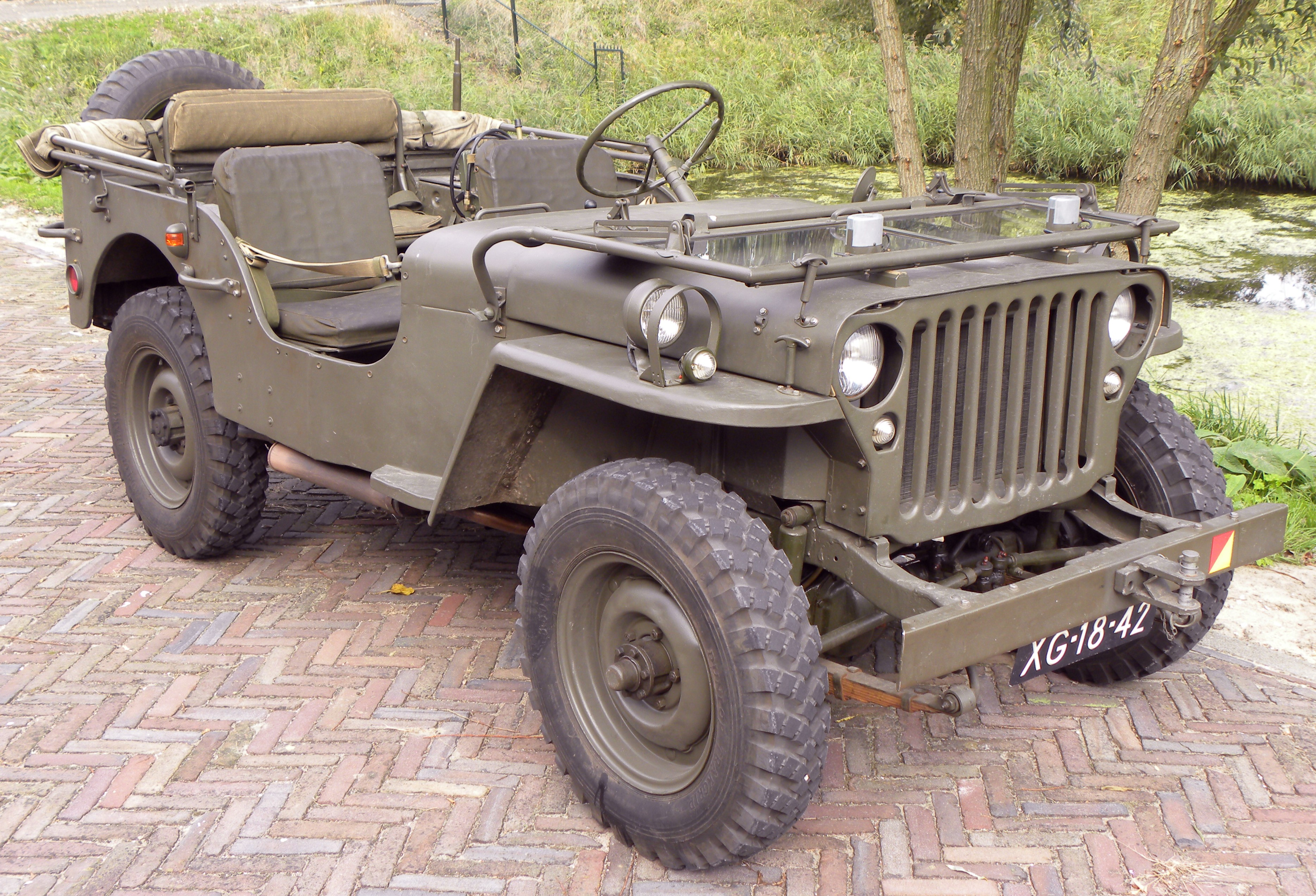
1943 Willys Jeep

Final production version jeeps built by Willys-Overland were the Model MB, while those built by Ford were the Model GPW (G = government vehicle, P = 80" wheelbase, W = Willys engine design). There were subtle differences between the two. The versions produced by Ford had every component (including bolt heads) marked with an "F", and early on Ford also stamped their name in large letters in their trademark script, embossed in the rear panel of their jeeps. Willys followed the Ford pattern by stamping 'Willys' into several body parts, but the U.S. government objected to this practice, and both parties stopped this in 1942. In spite of persistent advertising by both car and component manufacturers of contributions to the production of successful jeeps during the war, no "Jeep"-branded vehicles were built until the 1945 Willys CJ-2A.

The cost per vehicle trended upwards as the war continued from the price under the first contract from Willys at US$648.74 (Ford's was $782.59 per unit; these figures are equivalent to $10938 and $13195 in 2025, respectively). Willys-Overland and Ford, under the direction of Charles E. Sorensen (vice-president of Ford during World War II), produced about 640,000 Jeeps towards the war effort, which accounted for approximately 18% of all the wheeled military vehicles built in the U.S. during the war.

Jeeps were used by every service of the U.S. military. An average of 145 were supplied to every Army infantry regiment. Jeeps were used for many purposes, including cable laying, sawmilling, as firefighting pumpers, field ambulances, tractors, and, with suitable wheels, would run on railway tracks. An amphibious jeep, the model GPA, or "seep" (Sea Jeep) was built for Ford in modest numbers, but it could not be considered a success as it was neither a good off-road vehicle nor a good boat. As part of the war effort, nearly 30% of all Jeep production was supplied to Great Britain and to the Soviet Red Army.

== Post-war military ==
The Jeep has been widely imitated around the world, including in France by Delahaye and by Hotchkiss et Cie (after 1954, Hotchkiss manufactured Jeeps under license from Willys), and in Japan by Mitsubishi Motors and Toyota. The Land Rover was inspired by the Jeep. The utilitarian good looks of the original Jeep have been hailed by industrial designers and museum curators alike. The Museum of Modern Art described the Jeep as a masterpiece of functionalist design and has periodically exhibited the Jeep as part of its collection. Pulitzer Prize-winning war correspondent Ernie Pyle called the jeep, along with the Coleman G.I. Pocket Stove, "the two most important pieces of noncombat equipment ever developed". Jeeps became even more famous following the war, as they became available on the surplus market. Some ads claimed to offer "Jeeps still in the factory crate." This legend persisted for decades, despite the fact that Jeeps were never shipped from the factory in crates (although Ford did "knock down" Jeeps for easier shipping, which may have perpetuated the myth).

The Jeepney is a unique type of taxi or bus created in the Philippines. The first Jeepneys were military-surplus MBs and GPWs, left behind in the war-ravaged country following World War II and Filipino independence. Jeepneys were built from Jeeps by lengthening and widening the rear "tub" of the vehicle, allowing them to carry more passengers. Over the years, Jeepneys have become the most ubiquitous symbol of the modern Philippines, even as they have been decorated in more elaborate and flamboyant styles by their owners. Most Jeepneys today are scratch-built by local manufacturers, using different powertrains.

Aside from Jeepneys, backyard assemblers in the Philippines construct replica Jeeps with stainless steel bodies and surplus parts, and are called "owner-type jeeps" (as jeepneys are also called "passenger-type jeeps").

In the United States military, the Jeep has been supplanted by a number of vehicles (e.g. Ford's M151) of which the latest is the Humvee.

=== CJ-V35/U ===
After World War II, Jeep began to experiment with new designs, including a model that could drive underwater. On February 1, 1950, contract N8ss-2660 was approved for 1,000 units "especially adapted for general reconnaissance or command communications" and "constructed for short period underwater operation such as encountered in landing and fording operations". The engine was modified with a snorkel system so that the engine could properly breathe underwater.

=== M715 ===
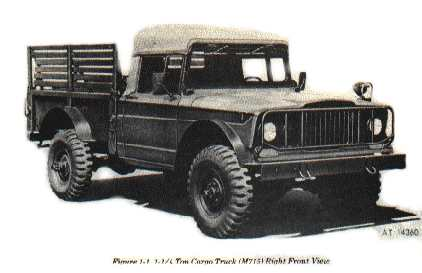
Jeep M715, developed in 1965

In 1965, Jeep developed the M715 1.25-short-ton (1.13-tonne) army truck, a militarized version of the civilian J-series Jeep truck, which served extensively in the Vietnam War. It had heavier full-floating axles and a foldable, vertical, flat windshield. Today, it serves other countries and is still being produced by Kia under license.

== Etymology ==
Many explanations of the origin of the word jeep have proven difficult to verify. The most widely held theory is that the military designation GP (for Government Purposes or General Purpose) was slurred into the word Jeep in the same way that the contemporary HMMWV (for High-Mobility Multi-purpose Wheeled Vehicle) has become known as the Humvee. Joe Frazer, Willys-Overland President from 1939 to 1944, claimed to have coined the word jeep by slurring the initials G.P. There are no contemporaneous uses of "GP" before later attempts to create a backronym.

A more detailed view, popularized by R. Lee Ermey on his television series Mail Call, disputes this "slurred GP" origin, saying that the vehicle was designed for specific duties, and was never referred to as "General Purpose" and it is highly unlikely that the average jeep-driving GI would have been familiar with this designation. The Ford GPW abbreviation actually meant G for government use, P to designate its 80-inch (2,000 mm) wheelbase and W to indicate its Willys-Overland designed engine. Ermey suggests that soldiers at the time were so impressed with the new vehicles that they informally named it after Eugene the Jeep, a character in the Thimble Theatre comic strip and cartoons created by E. C. Segar, as early as mid-March 1936. Eugene the Jeep was Popeye's "jungle pet" and was "small, able to move between dimensions and could solve seemingly impossible problems".

The word "jeep", however, was used as early as World War I, as U.S. Army slang for new uninitiated recruits, or by mechanics to refer to new, unproven vehicles. In 1937, tractors which were supplied by Minneapolis Moline to the US Army were called jeeps. A precursor of the Boeing B-17 Flying Fortress was also referred to as the jeep.

Words of the Fighting Forces by Clinton A. Sanders, a dictionary of military slang, published in 1942, in the library at The Pentagon gives this definition:

Jeep: A four-wheel drive vehicle of one-half- to one-and-one-half-ton [0.45 to 1.36 tonnes] capacity for reconnaissance or other army duty. A term applied to the bantam-cars, and occasionally to other motor vehicles (U.S.A.) in the Air Corps, the Link Trainer; in the armored forces, the 1/2-ton [0.45 tonnes] command vehicle. Also referred to as "any small plane, helicopter, or gadget."

This definition is supported by the use of the term "jeep carrier" to refer to the Navy's small escort carriers.

Early in 1941, Willys-Overland demonstrated the vehicle's off-road capability by having it drive up the steps of the United States Capitol, driven by Willys test driver Irving "Red" Hausmann, who had recently heard soldiers at Fort Holabird calling it a "jeep". When asked by syndicated columnist Katharine Hillyer for the Washington Daily News (or by a bystander, according to another account) what it was called, Hausmann answered, "It's a jeep."

Katharine Hillyer's article was published nationally on February 19, 1941, and included a picture of the vehicle with the caption:

LAWMAKERS TAKE A RIDE – With Senator Meade, of New York, at the wheel, and Representative Thomas, of New Jersey, sitting beside him, one of the Army's new scout cars, known as "jeeps" or "quads", climbs up the Capitol steps in a demonstration yesterday. Soldiers in the rear seat for gunners were unperturbed.

Although the term was also military slang for vehicles that were untried or untested, this exposure caused all other jeep references to fade, leaving the 4×4 with the name.

== Brand, trademarks and image ==
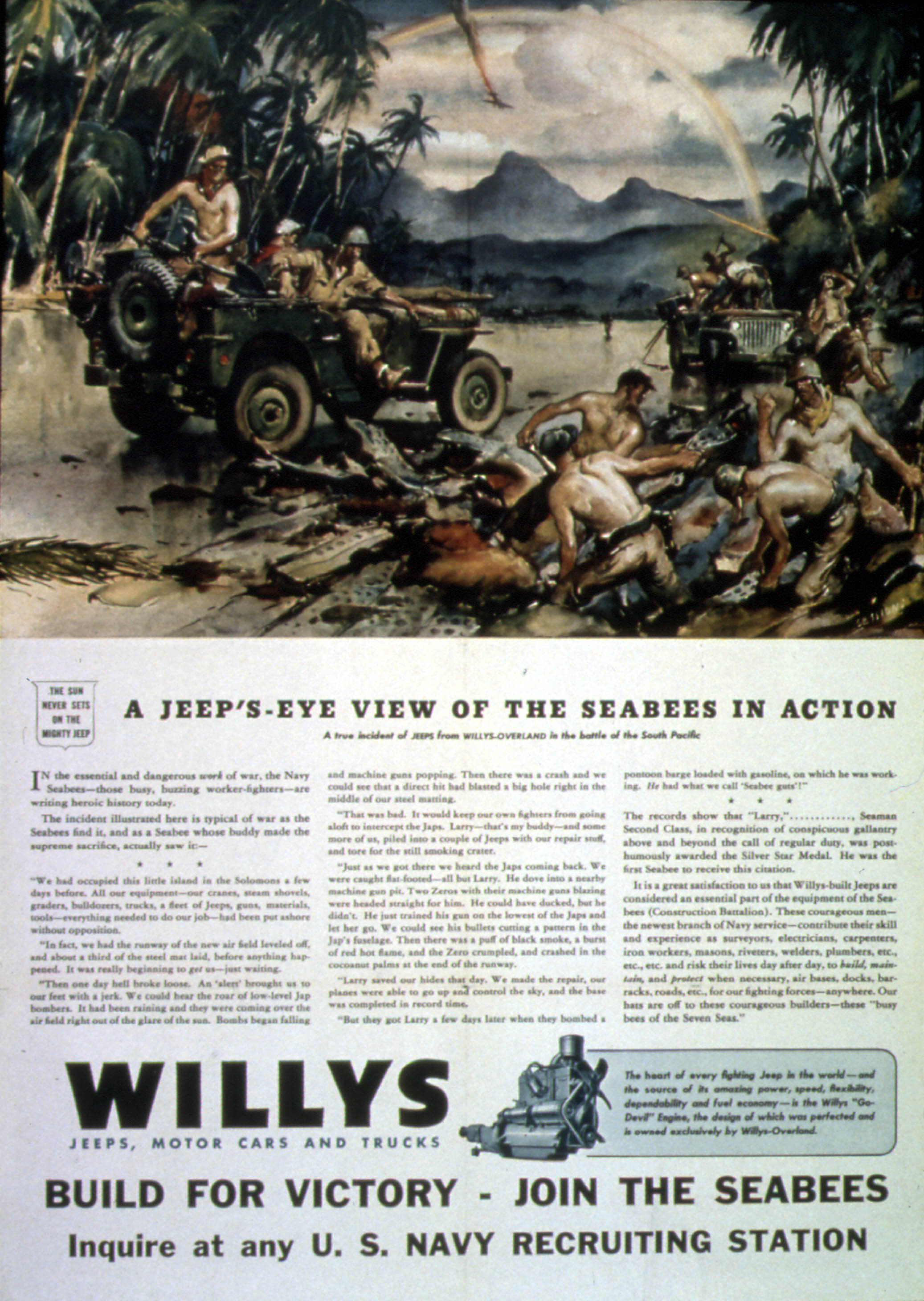
Willys wartime advertisement promoting its Jeeps' contribution to the war effort

The "Jeep" brand has gone through many owners, starting with Willys-Overland, which filed the original trademark application for the "Jeep" brand-name in February 1943. To help establish the term as a Willys brand, the firm campaigned with advertisements emphasizing Willys' prominent contribution to the Jeep that helped win the war. Willys' application initially met with years of opposition, primarily from Bantam, but also from Minneapolis-Moline. The Federal Trade Commission initially ruled in favor of Bantam in May 1943, largely ignoring Minneapolis-Moline's claim, and continued to scold Willys-Overland after the war for its advertising. The FTC even slapped the company with a formal complaint, to cease and desist any claims that it "created or designed" the Jeep – Willys was only allowed to advertise its contribution to the Jeep's development. Willys however proceeded to produce the first Civilian Jeep (CJ) branded vehicles in 1945. Being the only company that continually produced "Jeep" vehicles after the war, Willys-Overland was eventually granted the name "Jeep" as a registered trademark in June 1950. Aside from Willys, King Features Syndicate has held a trademark on the name "Jeep" for their comics since August 1936.

Willys had also seriously considered the brand name AGRIJEEP, and was granted the trademark for it in December 1944, but instead the civilian production models as of 1945 were marketed as the "Universal Jeep", which reflected a wider range of uses outside of farming.

FCA US LLC, the most recent successor company to the Jeep brand, now holds trademark status on the name "Jeep" and the distinctive 7-slot front grille design. The original 9-slot grille associated with all World War II jeeps was designed by Ford for their GPW, and because it weighed less than the original "Slat Grille" of Willys (an arrangement of flat bars), was incorporated into the "standardized jeep" design.

The history of the HMMWV (Humvee) has ties with Jeep. In 1971, Jeep's Defense and Government Products Division was turned into AM General, a wholly owned subsidiary of American Motors Corporation, which also owned Jeep. In 1979, while still owned by American Motors, AM General began the first steps toward designing the Humvee. AM General also continued manufacturing the two-wheel-drive DJ, which Jeep created in 1953. The General Motors Hummer and Chrysler Jeep have been waging battle in U.S. courts over the right to use seven slots in their respective radiator grilles. Chrysler Jeep claims it has the exclusive rights to use the seven vertical slits since it is the sole remaining assignee of the various companies since Willys gave their postwar jeeps seven slots instead of Ford's nine-slot design for the Jeep.

=== Off-road abilities ===
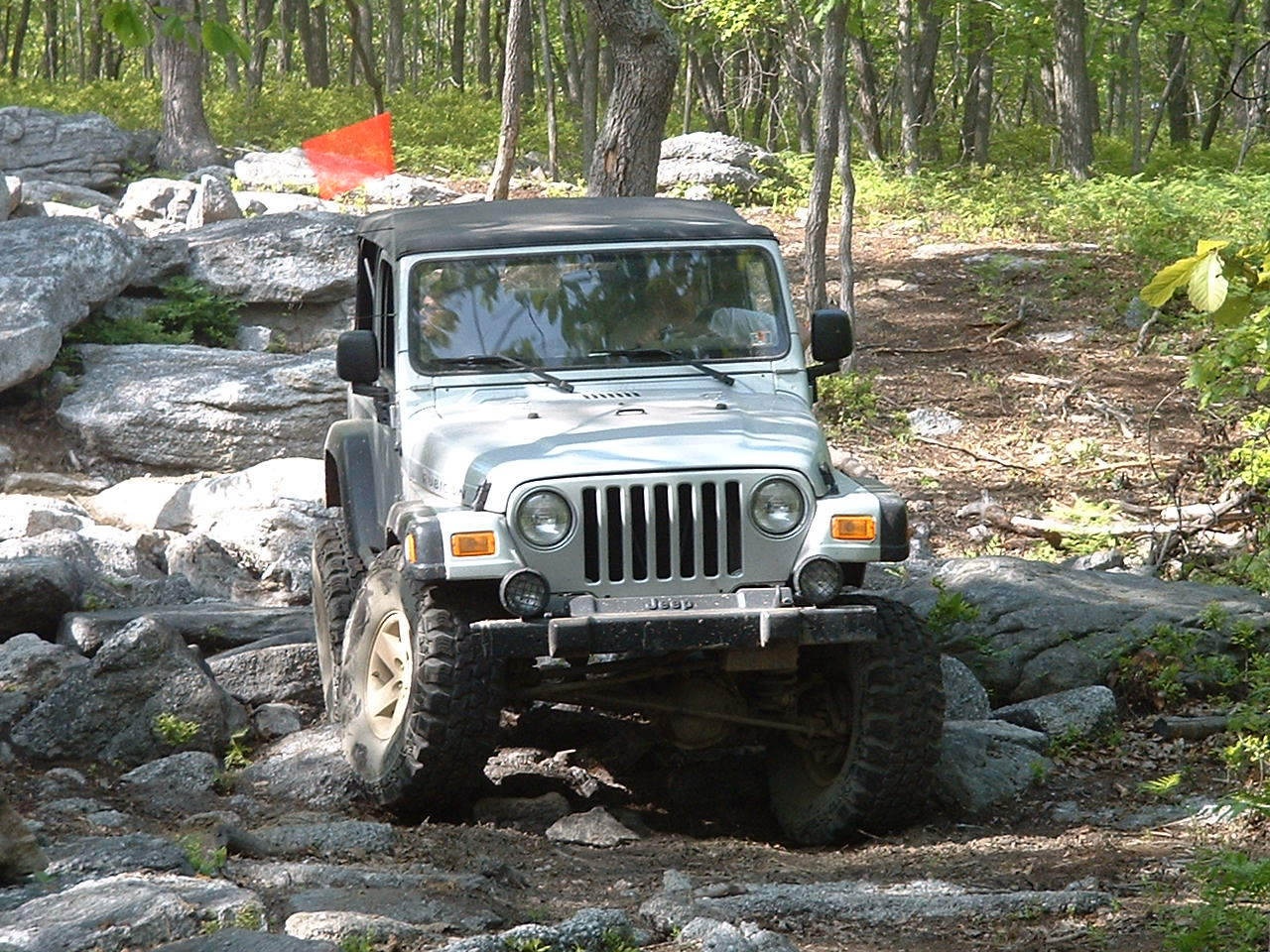
Jeep Wrangler off-roading

Jeep advertising has always emphasized the brand's vehicles' off-road capabilities. Today, the Wrangler is one of the few remaining four-wheel-drive vehicles with solid front and rear axles. These axles are known for their durability, strength, and articulation. New Wranglers come with a Dana 44 rear differential and a Dana 30 front differential. The upgraded Rubicon model of the JK Wrangler is equipped with electronically activated locking differentials, Dana 44 axles front and rear with 4.10 gears, a 4:1 transfer case, electronic sway bar disconnect, and heavy-duty suspension.

Another benefit of solid axle vehicles is they tend to be easier and cheaper to "lift" with aftermarket suspension systems. This increases the distance between the axle and chassis of the vehicle. By increasing this distance, larger tires can be installed, which will increase the ground clearance, allowing it to traverse even larger and more difficult obstacles. In addition to higher ground clearance, many owners aim to increase suspension articulation or "flex" to give their Jeeps greatly improved off-road capabilities. Good suspension articulation keeps all four wheels in contact with the ground and maintains traction.

Useful features of the smaller Jeeps are their short wheelbases, narrow frames, ample approach, breakover, and departure angles, thus enabling them to traverse through places where full-size four-wheel drives have difficulty.

The Jeep's design does have some drawbacks however. The short wheelbase and lighter weight make climbing steeper inclines more difficult, as the weight cannot be as evenly distributed on an angle compared to longer wheelbase off-roaders. The usage of solid axles affects ground clearance, as their design makes them the lowest point to the ground regardless of the height of the body. Earlier Jeeps lacked basic safety equipment such as doors, seatbelts or roll cages, making them extremely dangerous if rolled over.

== Company history and ownership ==
After the war, Willys did not resume production of its passenger-car models, choosing instead to concentrate on Jeeps and Jeep-branded vehicles, launching the Jeep Station Wagon in 1946, the Jeep Truck in 1947, and the Jeepster in 1948. An attempt to re-enter the passenger-car market in 1952 with the Willys Aero sedan proved unsuccessful, and ended with the company's acquisition by Kaiser Motors in 1953, for $60 million. Kaiser initially called the merged company "Willys Motors", but renamed itself Kaiser-Jeep in 1963. By the end of 1955, Kaiser-Frazer had dropped the Willys Aero, as well as its own passenger cars to sell Jeeps exclusively.

American Motors Corporation (AMC) in turn purchased Kaiser's money-losing Jeep operations in 1970. This time $70 million changed hands. The utility vehicles complemented AMC's passenger car business by sharing components, achieving volume efficiencies, as well as capitalizing on Jeep's international and government markets. In 1971, AMC spun off Jeep's commercial, postal, and military vehicle lines into a separate subsidiary, AM General – the company that later developed the M998 Humvee. In 1976 Jeep introduced the CJ-7, replacing the CJ-6 in North America, as well as crossing 100,000 civilian units in annual global sales for the first time.

The French automaker Renault began investing in AMC in 1979. Renault began selling Jeeps through their European dealerships soon thereafter, beginning in Belgium and France, gradually supplanting a number of independent importers. During this period Jeep introduced the XJ Cherokee, its first unibody SUV; and global sales topped 200,000 for the first time in 1985. However, the replacement of the CJ Jeeps by the new Wrangler line in 1986 marked the start of a different era. By 1987, the automobile markets had changed and Renault itself was experiencing financial troubles, stemming from their heavy investment into AMC while simultaneously laying workers off in France; this led to the assassination of then-Renault CEO Georges Besse in 1986 by the French extremist group Action Directe. Renault's upper management quickly moved to sell off AMC.

Chrysler Corporation bought out AMC in 1987, shortly after the Jeep CJ-7 had been replaced with the AMC-designed Wrangler YJ; the acquisition was primarily for Jeep. After more than 40 years, the four-wheel drive utility vehicles brand that had been a profitable niche for smaller automakers fell into the hands of one of the Big Three; Jeep was the only AMC brand continued by Chrysler after the acquisition, partnered with the new Eagle marque (created for legal reasons involving Renault's sale of the AMC assets to Chrysler) as the Jeep-Eagle division. Chrysler subsequently merged with Daimler-Benz in 1998 (by which point Eagle was discontinued) and folded into DaimlerChrysler. During this time, the Chrysler and Jeep sales channels were combined, primarily to complement Chrysler's luxury automobiles with Jeep's popular SUVs. DaimlerChrysler eventually sold most of its interest in Chrysler to a private equity company in 2007. Chrysler and the Jeep division operated under Chrysler Group LLC, until December 15, 2014, when Chrysler folded into Fiat Chrysler Automobiles, with the stateside subsidiary operating under 'FCA US LLC'.

Jeeps have been built under licence by various manufacturers around the world, including Mahindra in India, EBRO in Spain, and several in South America. Mitsubishi built more than 30 models in Japan between 1953 and 1998; Most were based on the CJ-3B model of the original Willys-Kaiser design.

Toledo, Ohio, has been the headquarters of the Jeep brand since its inception, and the city has always been proud of this heritage. Although no longer produced in the same Toledo Complex as the World War II originals, two streets in the vicinity of the old plant are named Willys Parkway and Jeep Parkway. The Jeep Wrangler is built in the city currently, not far from the site of the original Willys-Overland plant.

American Motors set up the first automobile-manufacturing joint venture in the People's Republic of China on January 15, 1984. The result was Beijing Jeep Corporation, Ltd., in partnership with Beijing Automobile Industry Corporation, to produce the Jeep Cherokee (XJ) in Beijing. Manufacture continued after Chrysler's buyout of AMC. This joint venture is now part of DaimlerChrysler and DaimlerChrysler China Invest Corporation. The original 1984 XJ model was updated and called the "Jeep 2500" toward the end of its production that ended after 2005.

In October 2022, the joint venture between Stellantis and Chinese company Guangzhou Automobile Group filed for bankruptcy, although Stellantis said it intends to continue servicing Jeep brand customers in China.

While Jeeps have been built in India under license by Mahindra & Mahindra since the 1960s, Jeep has entered the Indian market directly in 2016, starting with the release of the Wrangler and Grand Cherokee in the country.

=== Ownership chronology ===
- 1944–1953: Willys-Overland
- 1953–1964: Kaiser Jeep (calling themselves "Willys Motors")
- 1964–1970: Kaiser Jeep
- 1970–1987: AMC (w/ Renault controlling production in 1986)
- 1987–1998: Chrysler Corporation
- 1998–2007: DaimlerChrysler
- 2007–2009: Chrysler LLC
- 2009–2013: Chrysler Group LLC – Fiat Group Automobiles
- 2014–2021: Fiat Chrysler Automobiles
- 2021–present: Stellantis

== Leadership ==
Current: Branden Coté, Jeep Brand CEO

=== Previous CEOs/presidents ===
- Bob Broderdorf (February 2025 - July 2026)
- Mike Manley (2009–2018)
- Christian Meunier (2019–2023)
- Antonio Filosa (2023–2025)

== Military model list ==
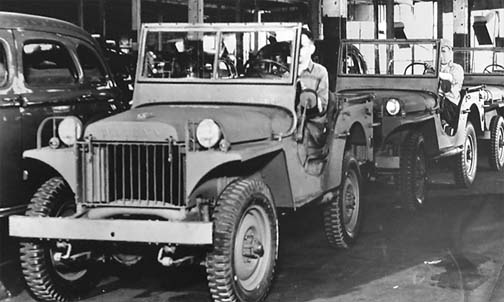
Willys MA on the assembly line, 1941

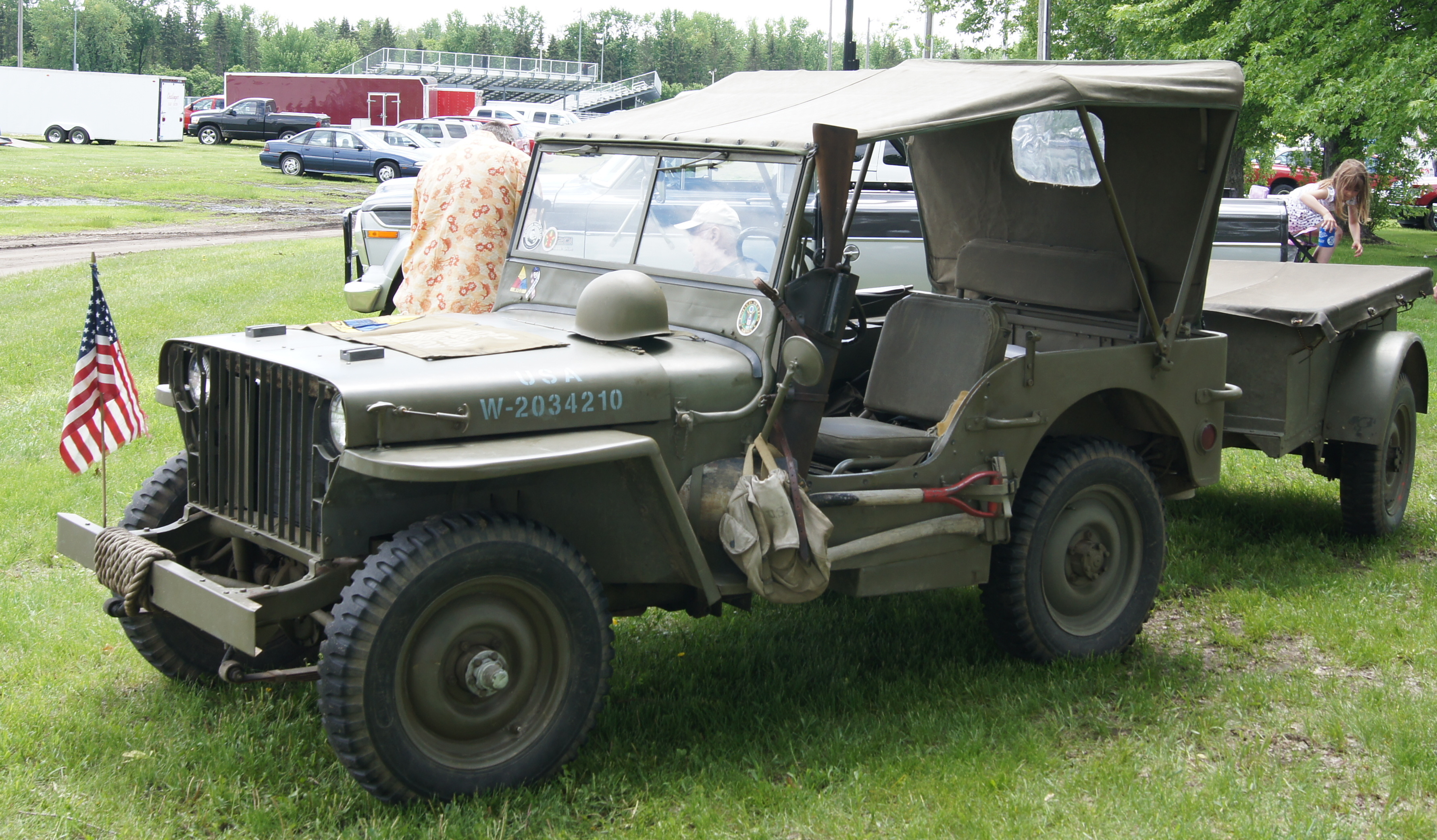
1942 Willys MB slat grille

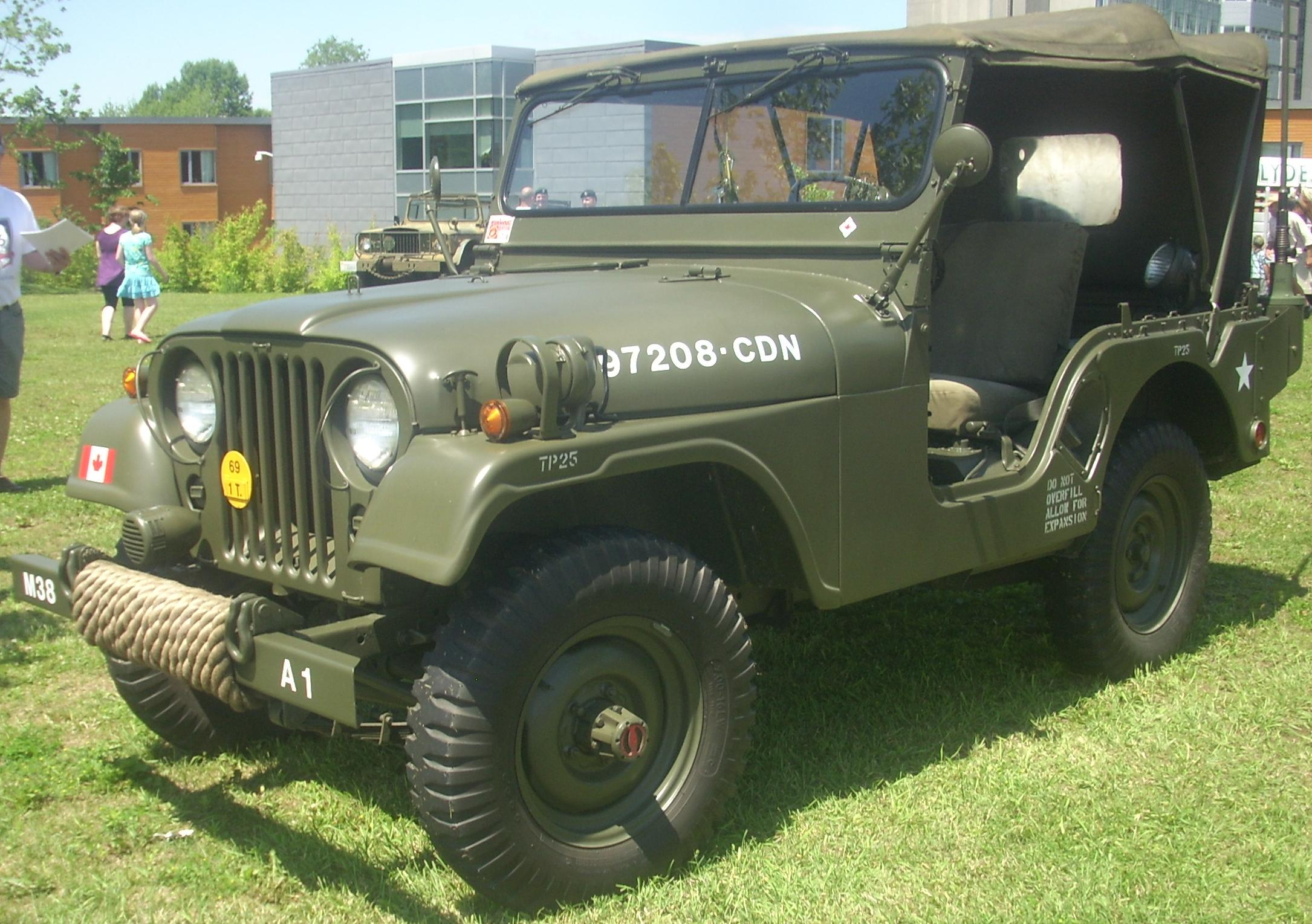
1952–1957 Willys / Kaiser MD

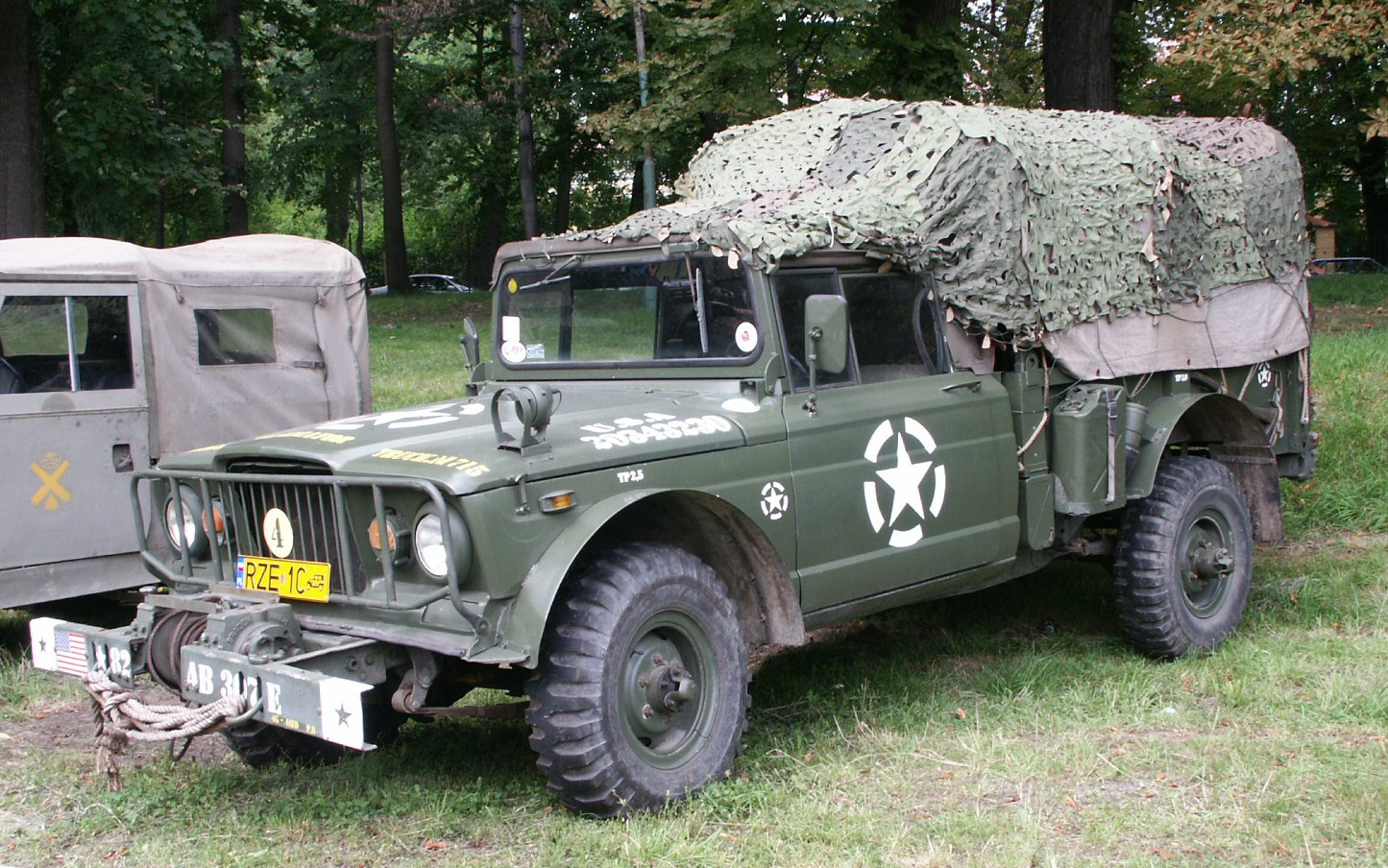
Jeep M715 truck

- 1940 Willys Quad — Willys' first prototype, competing for the U.S. Army contract for a 1/4-short-ton (0.23-tonne) reconnaissance vehicle
- 1941 Willys MA — Willys' low-volume preproduction model, preceding the standardized World War II jeep
- 1941–1944 Willys MT "Super Jeep" — 6x6, 3/4-short-ton (0.68-tonne) prototype — a small number were built in various configurations
- 1942 Willys MB – slat grille
- 1942–1945 Willys MB – stamped grille
- 1943 Willys WAC (for 'Willys Air Cooled') "Jeeplet" — prototype for a super light-weight, full-time 4WD with front and rear independent suspension
- 1944 Willys MLW-1 (for 'Military Long Wheelbase') — prototype (never finished)
- 1944 Willys MLW-2 (for 'Military Long Wheelbase') or "Jungle Jeep" — prototype for a half-ton, jungle-suited jeep
- 1948 Willys Jungle Burden Carrier — a medical litter, personnel and cargo carrier, built in small numbers for testing in jungle warfare and with airborne forces.
- 1949–1952 Willys MC / M38
- 1950 CJ V-35(/U) – deep water fording CJ-3A; 1000 units built for the USMC
- 1952–1971 Willys / Kaiser MD / M38A1
  - 1952–1957 Willys M38A1C – fitted with 105/106mm anti-tank recoilless rifle
  - 1950s/1960s Willys M38A1D – a small number of M38A1s carried the M28 or M29 "Davy Crockett Weapon System", the US' smallest tactical nuclear weapon, fired from a 120mm or 155mm recoilless rifle
  - M170 Ambulance
- 1953 Willys BC Bobcat aka "Aero Jeep" — prototype for a very small, lightweight (1,475 lb or 669 kg) jeep, for easier lifting by helicopters of the day.
- 1958–1960 Willys XM443 / M443E1 "Super Mule" – prototypes for 3/4-short-ton (0.68-tonne), underfloor mid-engined platform-trucks, comparable to, but larger than the M274 "Mechanical Mule"
- 1959–1982 M151 jeep — Although the M151 was developed and initially produced by Ford, production contracts for the M151A2 were later also awarded to Kaiser Jeep and AM General Corp, a Jeep sister company, once Jeep had become part of AMC.
  - 1970–1982 M151A2
    - M718A1 Ambulance
    - M825 Weapons Platform
- 1960–1968 Jeep M606
- 1964 US Navy and USMC variants of the Forward Control FC-170, labeled "Truck, Diesel engine, 7,000-pound (3,200 kg) GVW, 4x4":
  - M676 Truck, Cargo Pickup
  - M677 Truck, Cargo Pickup w/4 Dr. Cab
  - M678 Truck, Carry All
  - M679 Truck, Ambulance
- 1967–1969 Kaiser Jeep M715 truck — based on the civilian Jeep Gladiator

== Civilian model list ==
=== Jeep CJ ===
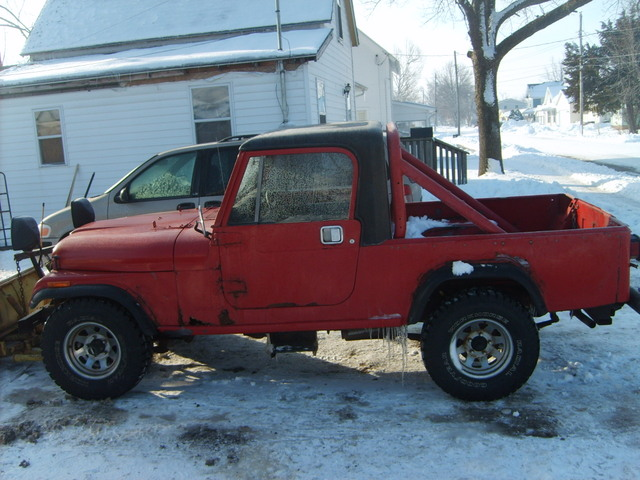
1982 Jeep Scrambler

The CJ (for "Civilian Jeep") series were literally the first "Jeep" branded vehicles sold commercially to the civilian public, beginning in 1945 with the CJ-2A, followed by the CJ-3A in 1949 and the CJ-3B in 1953. These early Jeeps are frequently referred to as "flat-fenders" because their front fenders were completely flat and straight, just as on the original WW II model (the Willys MB and identical Ford GPW).

The CJ-4 exists only as a single 1951 prototype and constitutes the "missing link" between the flat-fendered CJ-2A and CJ-3A/B, and the subsequent Jeeps with new bodies, featuring rounded fenders and hoods, beginning with the 1955 CJ-5, first introduced as the military Willys MD (or M38A1). The restyled body was mostly prompted to clear the taller new overhead-valve Hurricane engine.

- 1944–1945 CJ-2 – pre-production units
- 1945–1949 CJ-2A
- 1949–1953 CJ-3A
- 1953–1968 CJ-3B
- 1954–1983 CJ-5
- 1955–1975 CJ-6
- 1964–1967 CJ-5A/CJ-6A Tuxedo Park
- 1976–1986 CJ-7
- 1981–1985 CJ-8 Scrambler
- 1981–1985 CJ-10

=== Willys Jeep Station Wagon and Truck ===
- The 1946–1965 Willys Jeep Station Wagon and the
- 1947–1965 Willys Jeep Truck shared much in terms of styling and engineering.

With over 300,000 wagons and variants built in the U.S., it was one of Willys' most successful post-World War II models. Its production coincided with consumers moving to the suburbs.

=== Willys / Jeep Jeepster & (Jeepster) Commando ===
The Jeepster introduced in 1948 was directly based on the rear-wheel-drive Jeep Station Wagon chassis, and shared many of the same parts.

- 1948–1950 Willys VJ Jeepster
- 1948–1949 VJ2 Jeepster
- 1949–1951 VJ3 Jeepster

(Jeepster) Commando

- 1966–1971 C101—Jeepster Commando
- 1972–1973 C104—Jeep Commando

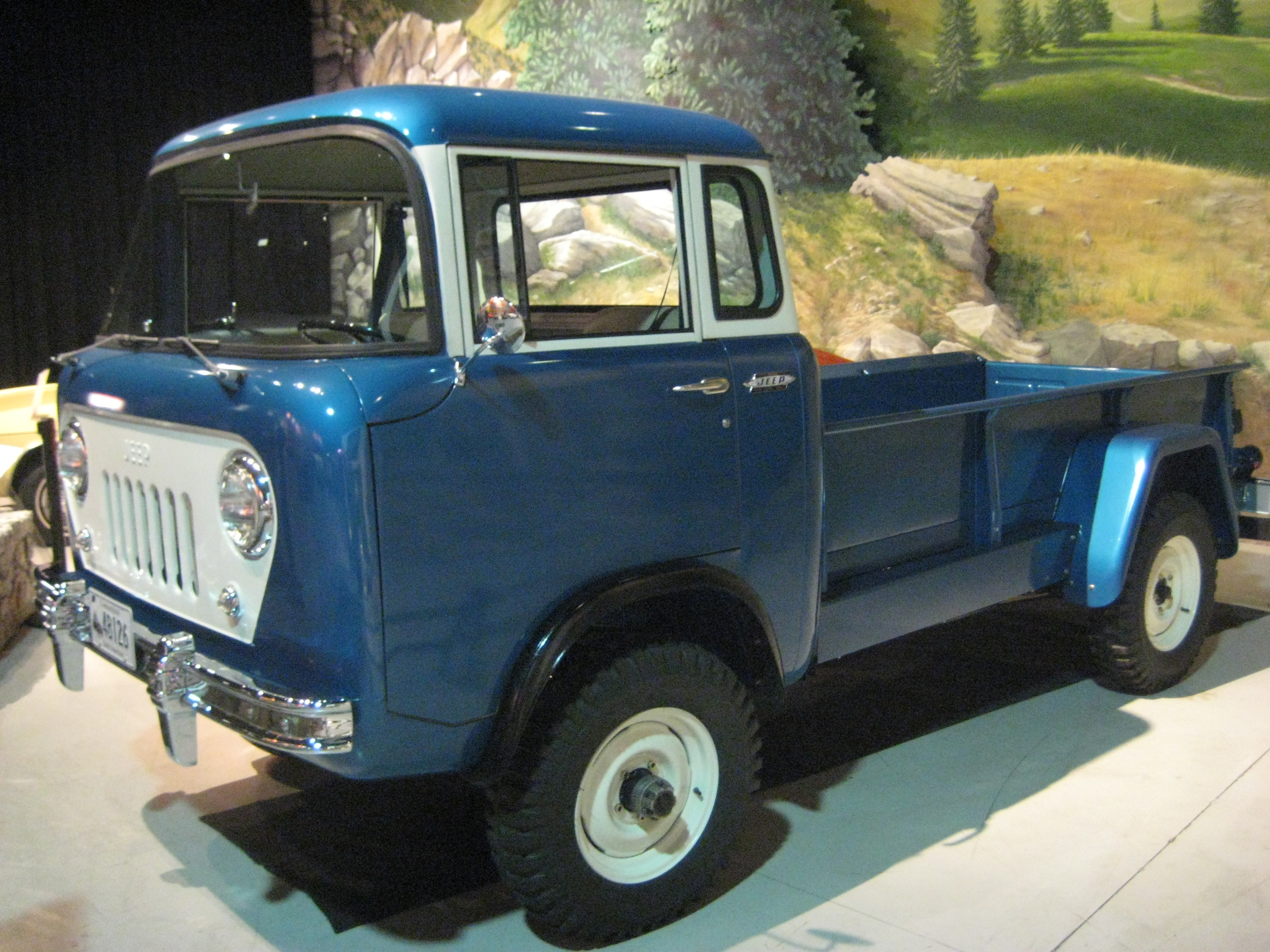
Willys Jeep FC-170 (1957–1965)

=== Jeep Forward Control ===
- The 1956–1965 Jeep Forward Control was built in both civilian and military models. The civilian versions were:
  - FC-150
  - FC-160—Spain, India
  - FC-170

=== Jeep DJ and Fleetvan ===
From 1955 onwards Willys offered two-wheel drive versions of their CJ Jeeps for commercial use, called DJ models (for 'Dispatcher Jeep'), in both open and closed body styles. A well-known version was the right-hand drive model with sliding side-doors, used by the US Postal service.
In 1961 the range was expanded with the 'Fleetvan' delivery van, based on DJ Jeeps.

- 1955 USAF DJ
- 1955–1964 DJ-3A
- 1965–1975 DJ-5
- 1965–1973 DJ-6
- 1967–1975 DJ-5A
- 1970–1972 DJ-5B
- 1973–1974 DJ-5C
- 1975–1976 DJ-5D
- 1976 DJ-5E Electruck
- 1977–1978 DJ-5F
- 1979 DJ-5G
- 1982 DJ-5L

Fleetvan Jeep

- 1961–1975 Fleetvan
  - FJ-3
  - FJ-3A
  - FJ-6
  - FJ-6A
  - FJ-8
  - FJ-9
Full-Size Jeeps

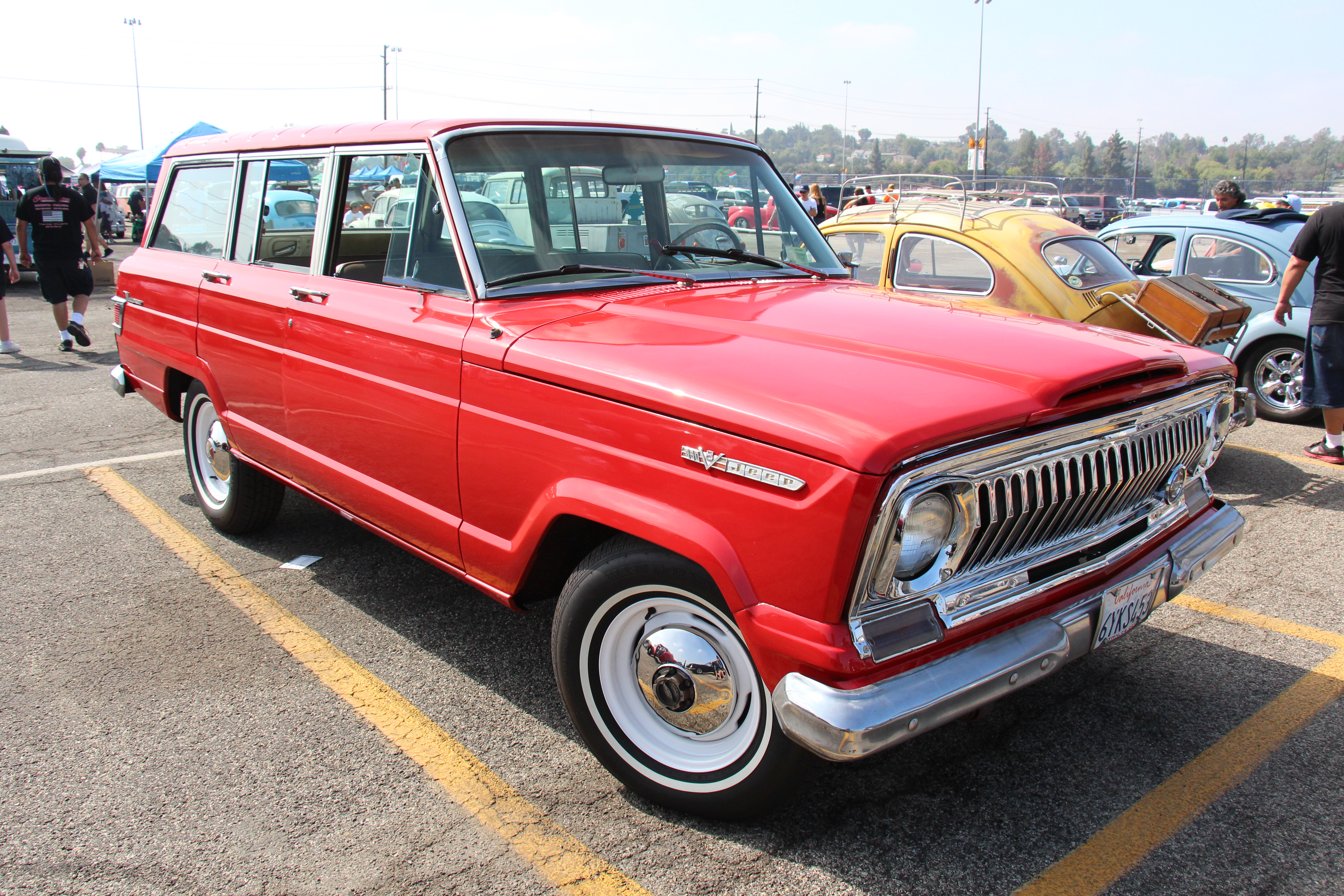
Jeep Wagoneer c. 1968

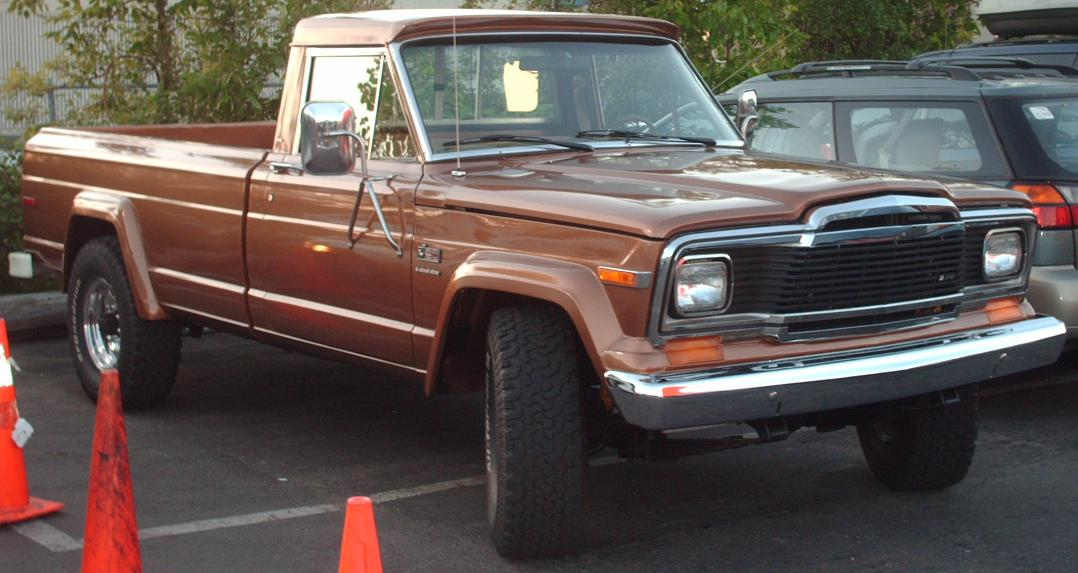
J20 pickup, Honcho package

=== SJ Wagoneer, Cherokee and pickups ===
SUV models (1962–1991)

- 1962–1983 SJ Wagoneer
- 1966–1969 SJ Super Wagoneer
- 1974–1983 SJ Cherokee
- 1984–1991 SJ Grand Wagoneer

Pickup models (1962–1988)

- 1962–1971 Jeep Gladiator (SJ)
- 1971–1988 Jeep pickup truck (J-)

=== Jeep Cherokee (XJ) and Comanche ===
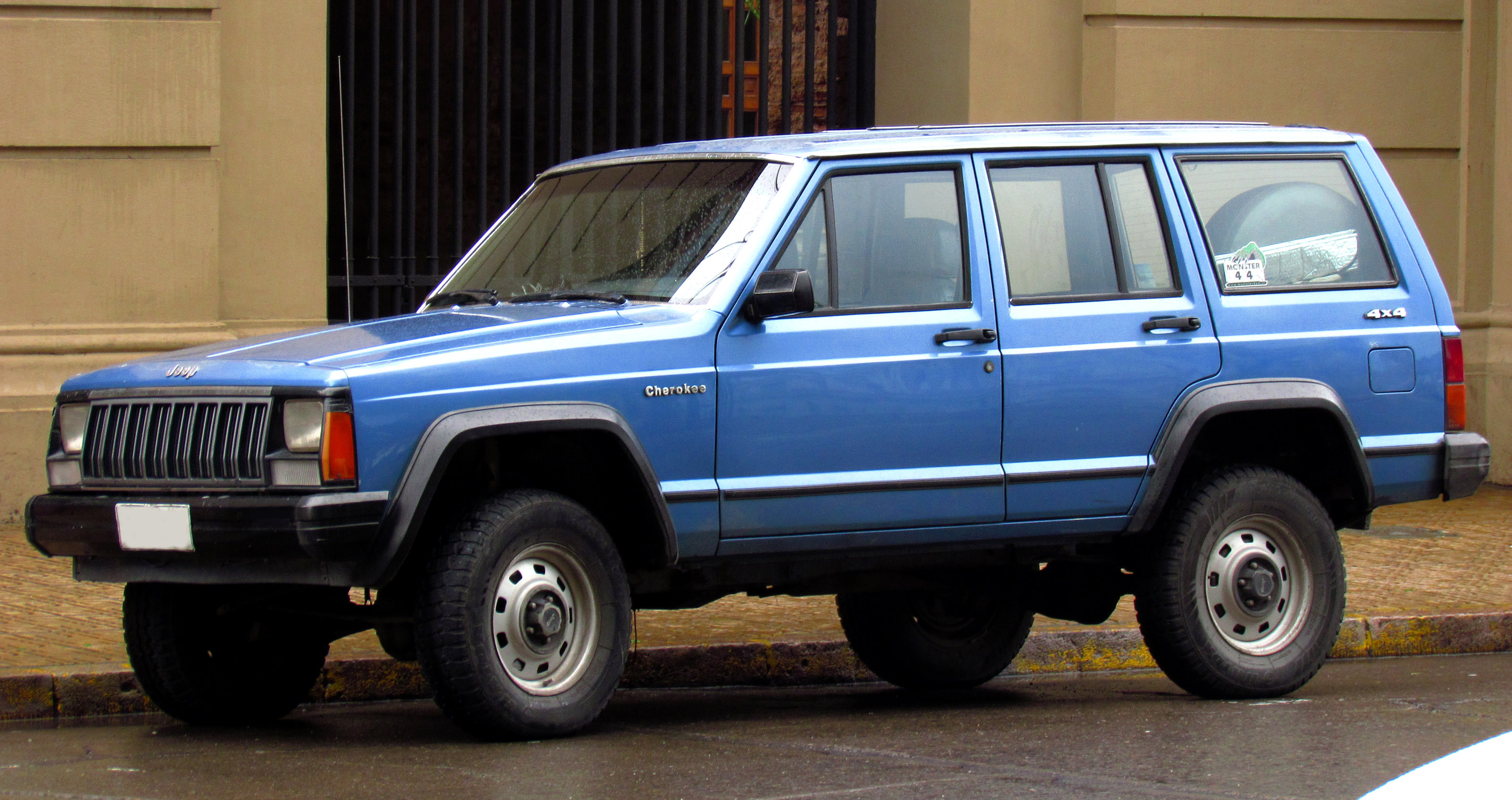
1988 Jeep Cherokee 2.5

- 1984–2001 XJ Cherokee
- 1984–1990 XJ Wagoneer
- 1986–1992 Jeep Comanche (MJ)
Jeep Wrangler

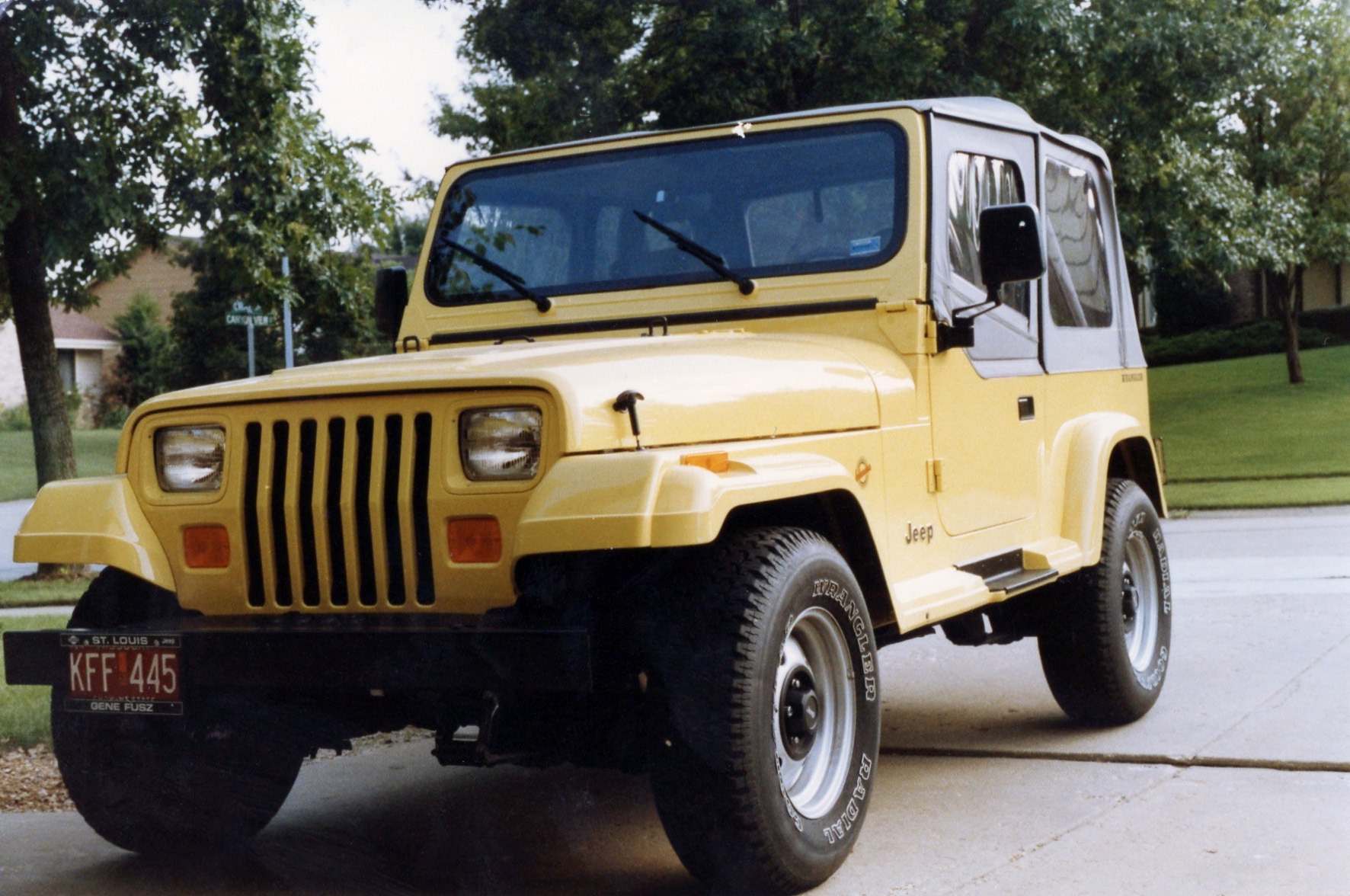
1989 Jeep Wrangler YJ Islander

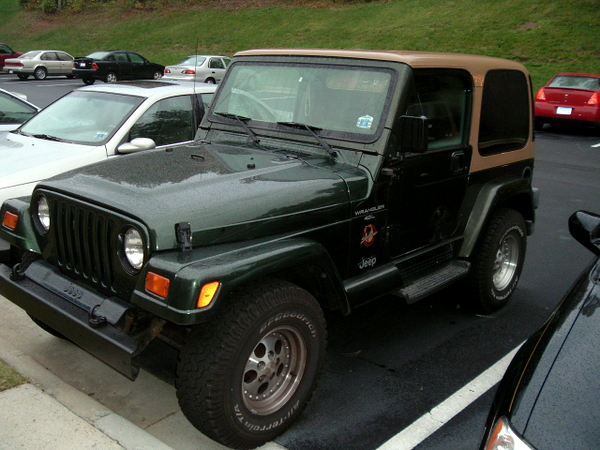
1997 Jeep Wrangler TJ

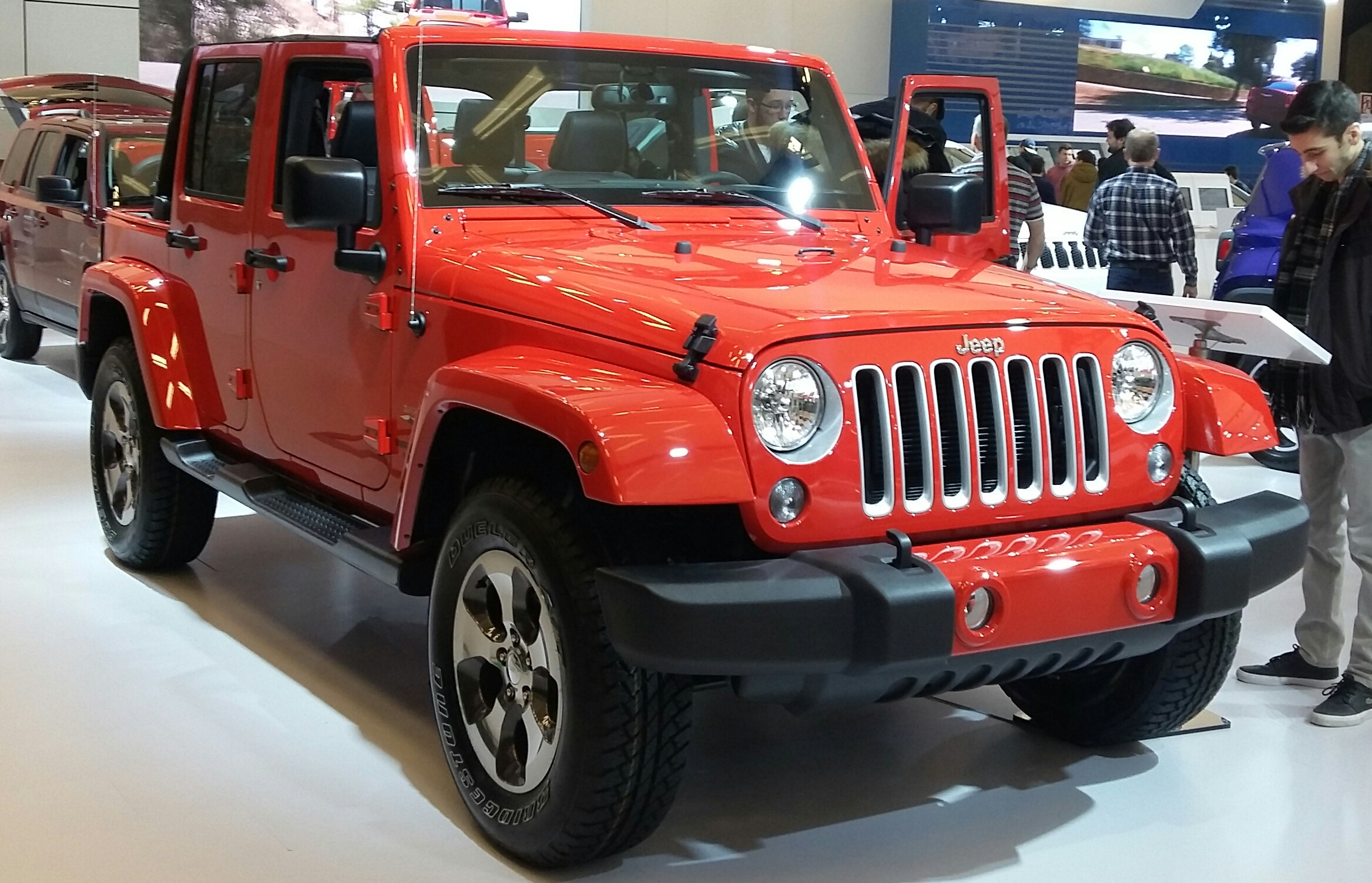
2016 Jeep Wrangler JK Unlimited (MIAS '16)

=== Jeep Wrangler ===
- 1987–1995 Jeep Wrangler YJ
- 1997–2006 Wrangler TJ
- 2007–2018 Wrangler JK
- 2017 – Jeep Wrangler JL
- 2019 – Jeep Gladiator JT

=== Grand Cherokee ===
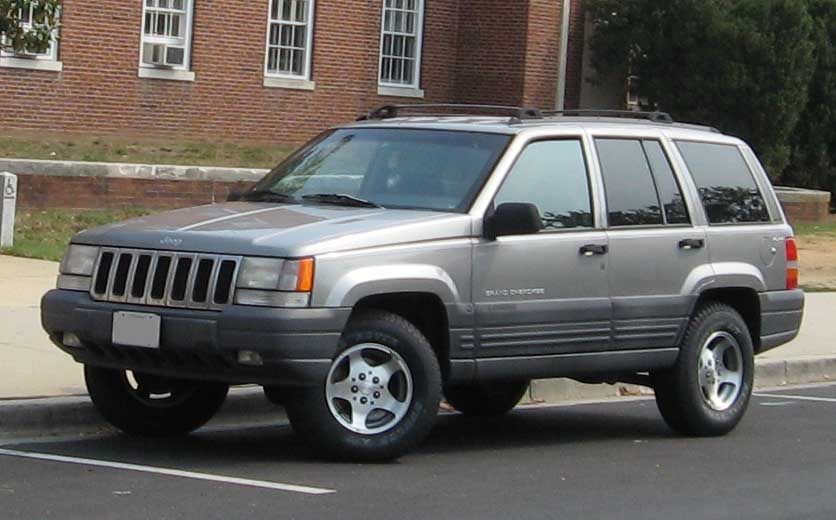
1st generation Grand Cherokee ZJ

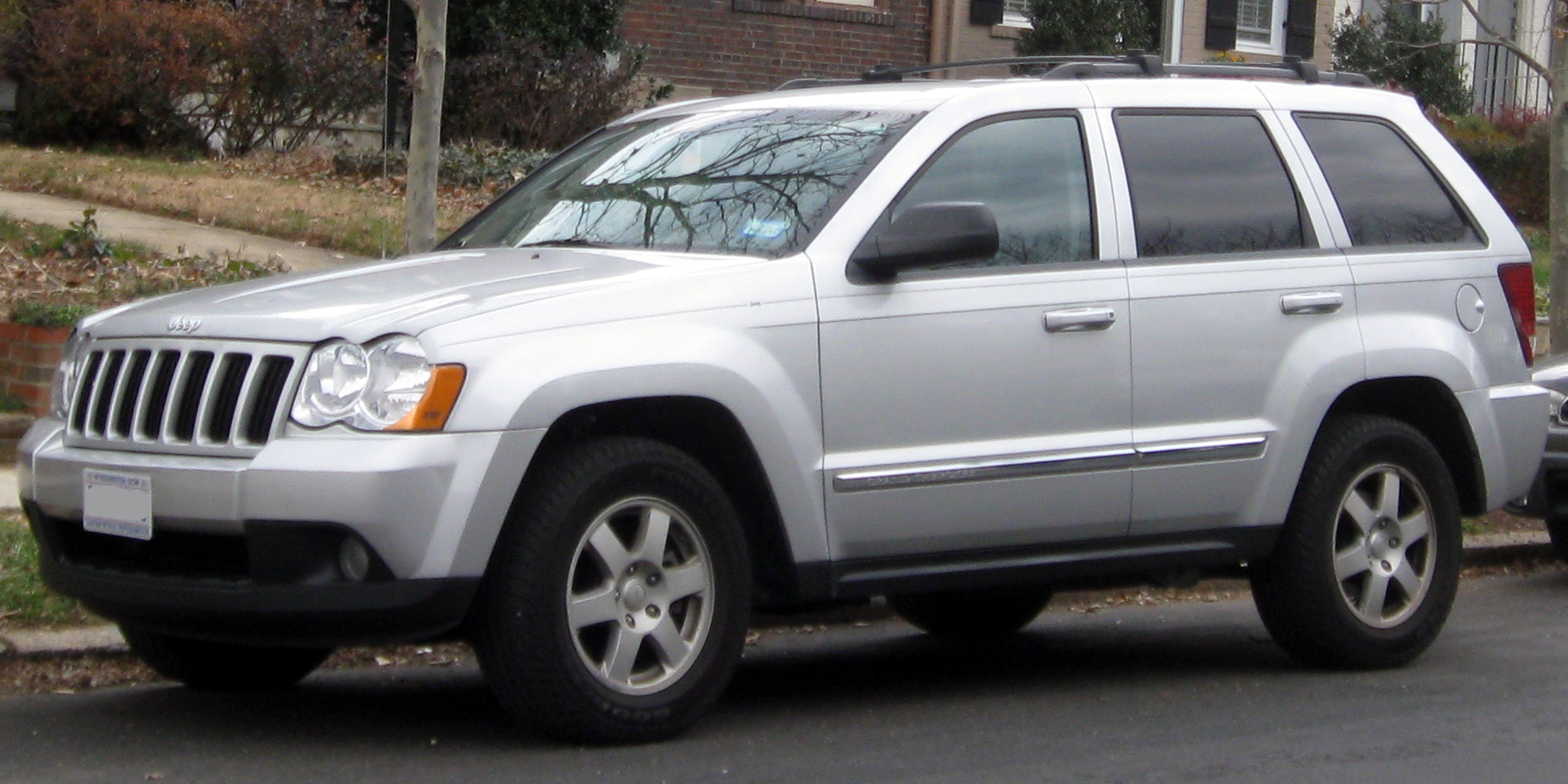
2008–2010 WK Grand Cherokee

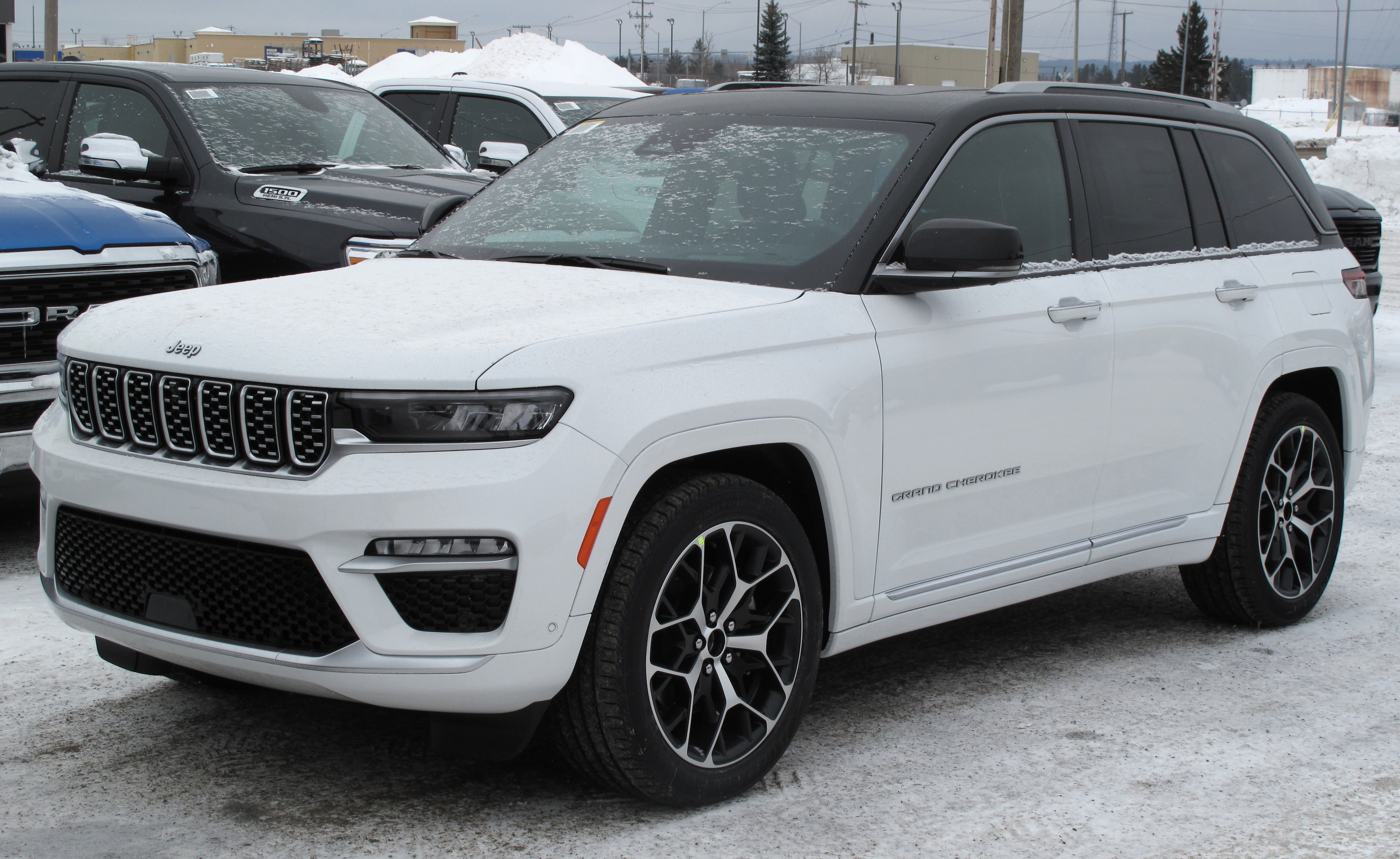
2022 Jeep Grand Cherokee WL

- 1993–1998 Grand Cherokee ZJ
- 1993 ZJ Jeep Grand Wagoneer
- 1999–2004 Grand Cherokee WJ Grand Cherokee
- 2005–2010 Grand Cherokee WK: Five-passenger family-oriented SUV – "WK" is the designator for the 2005–2010 Grand Cherokee, marks the beginning of the -K designation compared to the -J designation
- 2011–2022 Jeep Grand Cherokee WK2
- 2021–present Jeep Grand Cherokee WL

=== Jeep Liberty / Cherokee ===
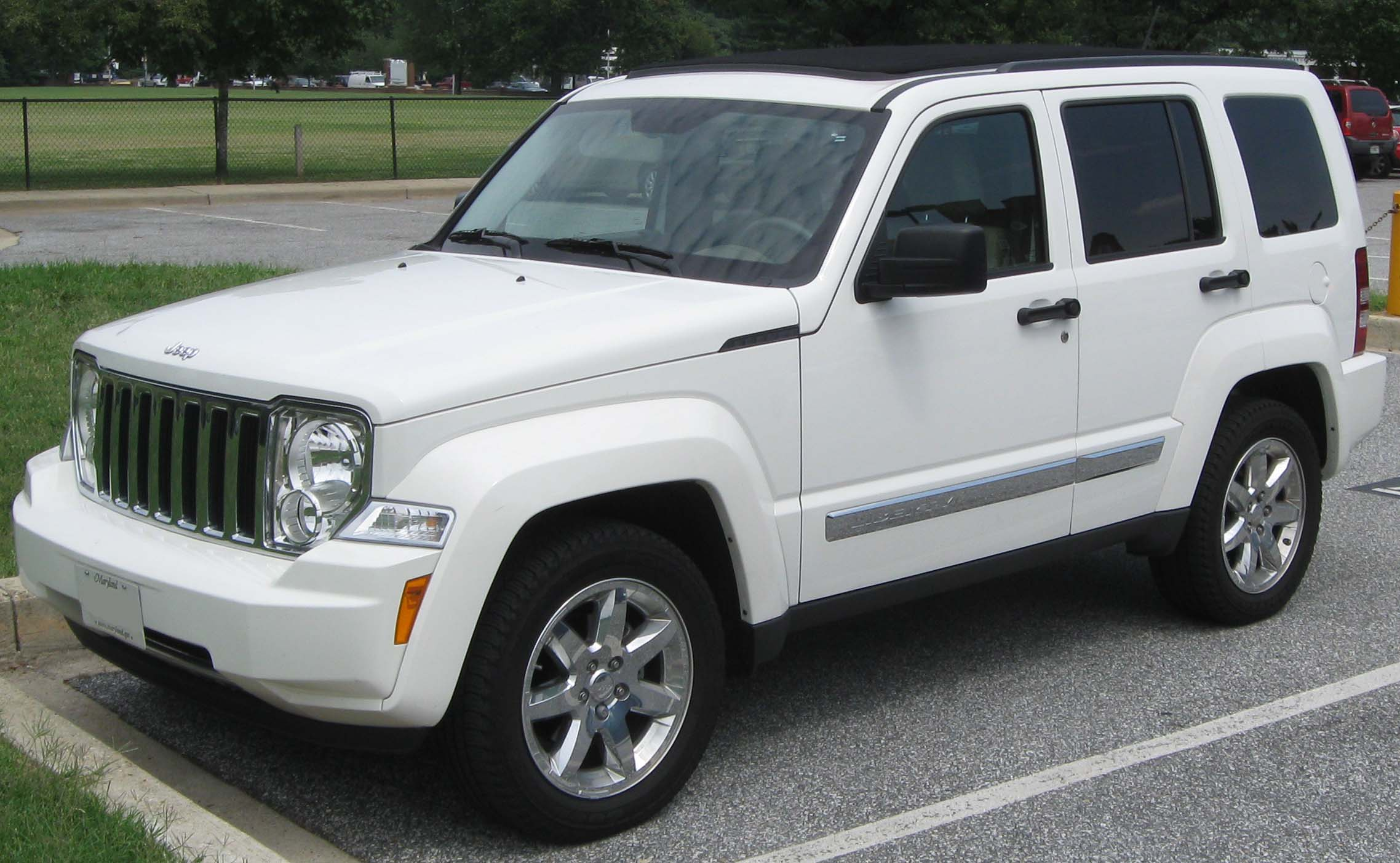
2008–2009 Jeep Liberty

- 2002–2007 Jeep Liberty KJ or Jeep Cherokee (KJ) outside North America
- 2008–2012 Jeep Liberty KK or Jeep Cherokee (KK) outside North America

=== Jeep Commander ===
- 2006–2010 Jeep Commander (XK)

=== Jeep Compass and Patriot platform ===
- 2007–2017 Jeep Compass MK49
- 2017–present Jeep Compass MP/552
- 2025–present Jeep Compass J4U
- 2006–2017 Jeep Patriot (MK74): Compact sport utility vehicle

== Current models ==
- Jeep Renegade Subcompact crossover, mainly for Latin America
- Jeep Avenger Subcompact crossover, mainly for the European market
- Jeep Compass: Compact crossover
- Jeep Commander: Mid-size crossover, mainly for emerging markets
- Jeep Cherokee: Mid-size crossover
- Jeep Grand Cherokee: Mid-size crossover, available in two wheelbases with two or three rows of seating
- Jeep Wagoneer S: Mid-sized upmarket battery-electric crossover
- Jeep Grand Wagoneer: Full-size three-row SUV available in two wheelbases
- Jeep Recon: Mid-size battery-electric offroad SUV
- Jeep Wrangler: Midsized 2- or 4-door offroad SUV with solid axles and a removable roof
- Jeep Gladiator: Mid-sized 4-door pickup truck with solid axles and a removable roof
- J8: Mid-Size military utility vehicle based on the previous generation Wrangler; Produced by AIL, AAV, and AEV
- TJL: Mid-sized 2-door pickup truck based on the previous generation Wrangler; Produced by AAV

== Jeeps built outside the U.S. ==
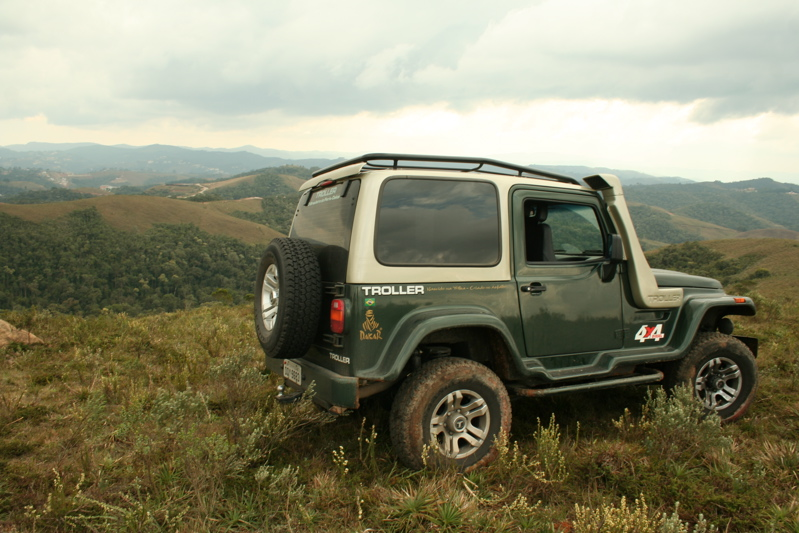
The Troller T4

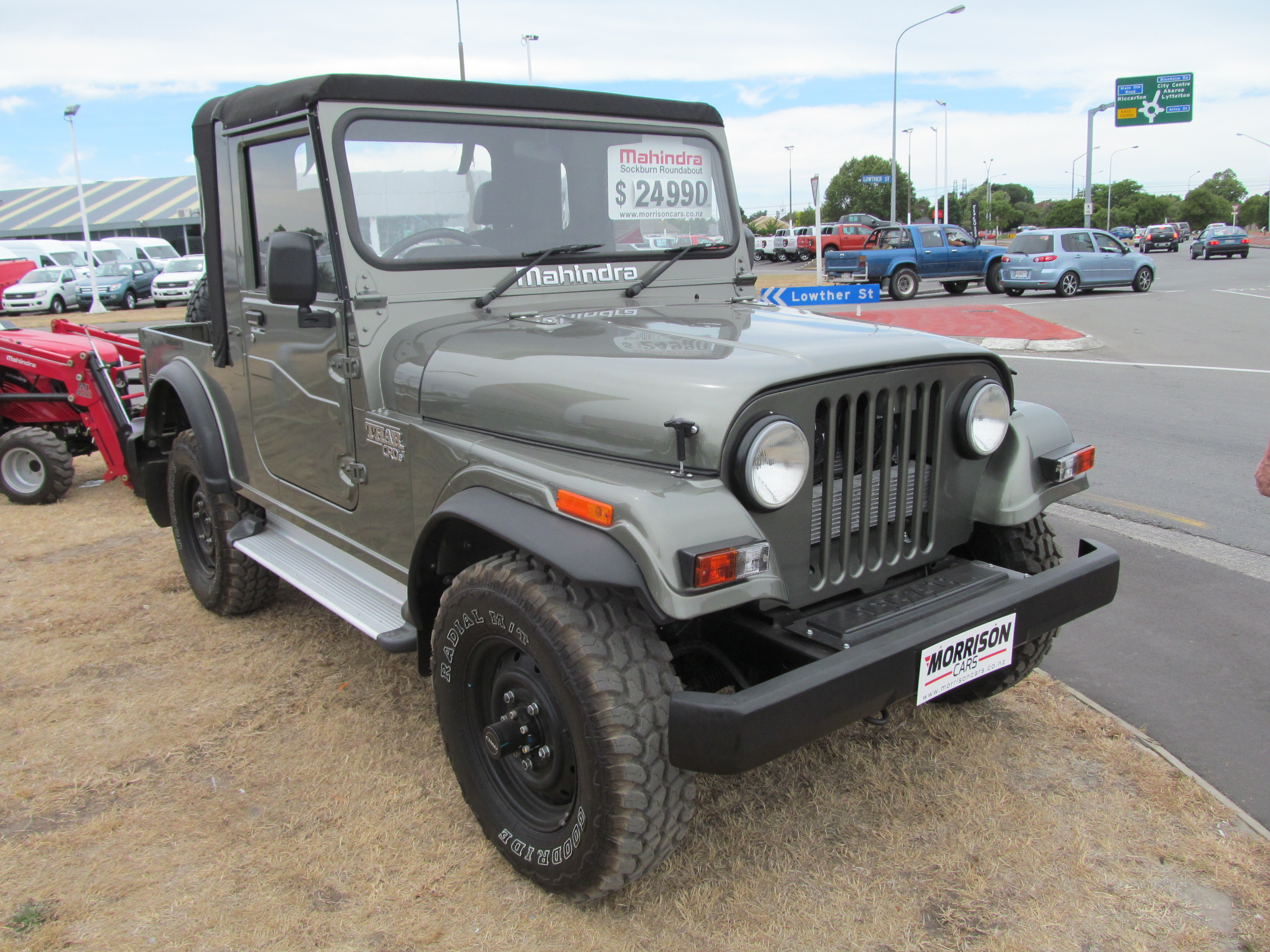
Mahindra & Mahindra Limited Indian Jeep

Jeeps have been built and/or assembled around the world by various companies.

- Argentina – IKA Jeeps 1956–current; now owned by Chrysler
- Australia – Willys Motors Australia – 1940s–1980s
- Brazil – Willys Overland do Brasil, purchased by Ford to become Ford do Brasil – 1957–1985 built the Jeep Rural from 1960 to 1977, and the Troller T4 is a fiberglass bodied Jeep version built in Brazil. Troller was purchased by Ford do Brasil in 2007.
- Burma/Myanmar – Two Burmese companies produce unlicensed copies of jeeps; Myanmar Jeeps and Chin Dwin Star Jeeps.
- Canada – Kaiser Jeep – 1959–1969
- China – Beijing Jeep Corporation – 1983 to 2009 as Beijing-Benz DaimlerChrysler Automotive. Since the 2014 sale of Chrysler and Jeep to FIAT jeeplike and other similar vehicles are now produced by BAIC subsidiary Beijing Automobile Works Co., Ltd. (BAW). Fiat-Chrysler plans to re-open Jeep production in China through a joint venture with Guangzhou Automobile Industry Group (GAIG).
- Colombia – Willys Colombia – at least until 1999
- Egypt – Arab Organization for Industrialization subsidiary Arab American Vehicles based in Cairo produces the Jeep Cherokee; the open-top, Wrangler-based Jeep AAV TJL.
- France – Licence produced jeeps: Hotchkiss M201 and by Cournil (now Auverland) – 1952–1962
- India – Mahindra & Mahindra Limited – 1960s-current
- Iran – Pars Khodro, ShahBaaz, Sahra, and Ahoo – ShahBaaz based on DJ series, Sahra based on Jeep Wrangler and CJ series, and Ahoo based on Wagoneer
- Israel – Automotive Industries which produces the AIL Storm (Sufa) series of Jeep Wrangler-derivatives
- Italy – 1950s
- Japan – Mitsubishi Jeeps – 1953–1998
- South Korea – Asia Motors, Ltd, Dong A Motors (SsangYong Motor Company), Keowha, and Kia. (None use Jeep name) – 1980s-current
- Mexico – VAM Jeeps – 1946–1987
- Netherlands – Nekaf Jeep, NEKAF and Kemper & Van Twist – 1954–1962
- Philippines – Jeepneys; MD Juan Willys MB; "E-jeepneys" or minibuses, LSV (low-speed vehicles) which uses electricity.
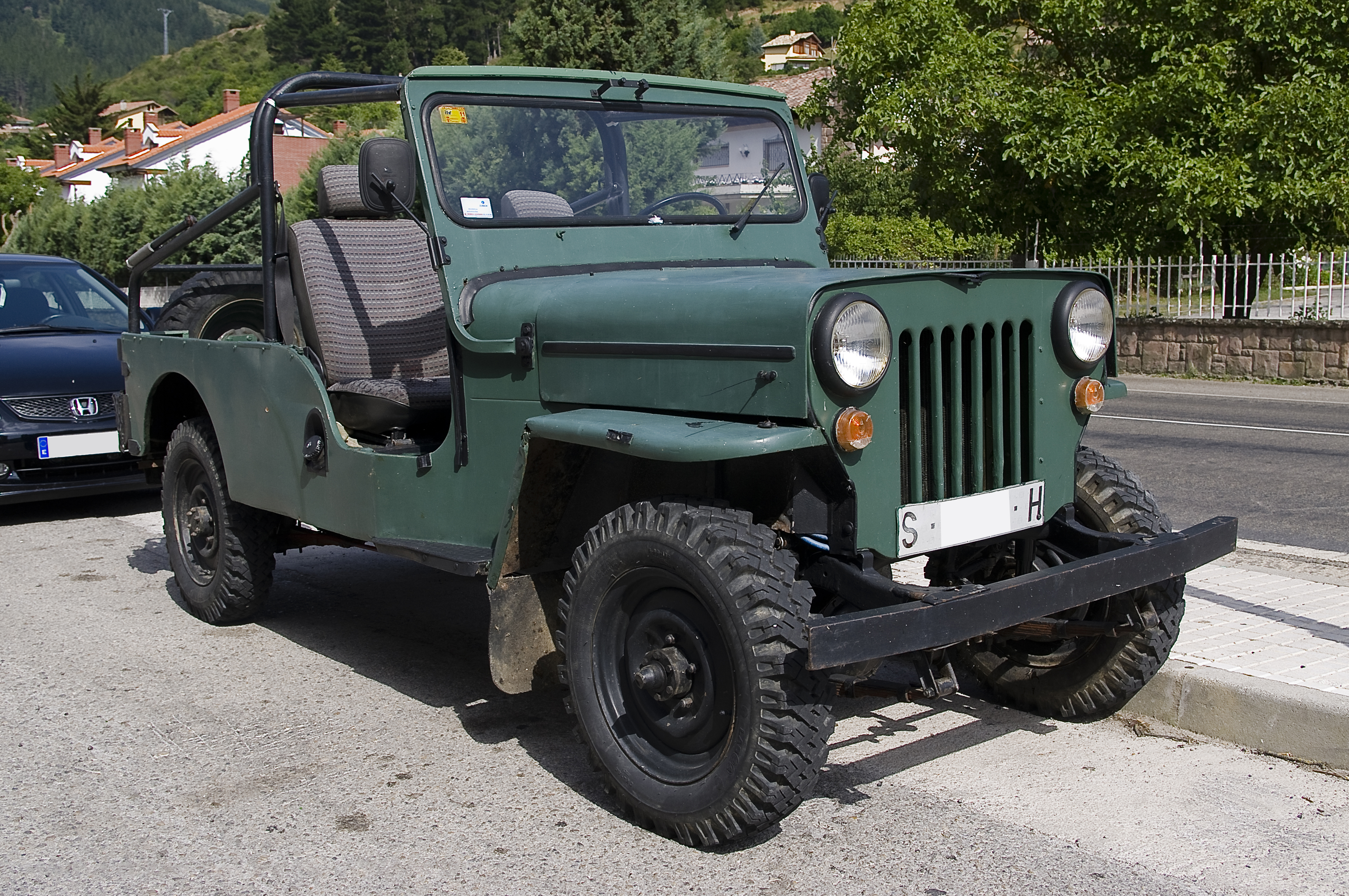
  Spanish-built long-wheelbase CJ-3B
- Portugal – Bravia Sarl – 1960s to 1980s This Lisbon company assembled a number of Kaiser Jeep M-201 models from several Spanish EBRO and VIASA parts built to order for the USAF airfields & the US Army based at the time in Portugal, of the 500 vehicles made, most had American running gear.
- Russia – Russian company APAL produces the Jeep-like Stalker which utilizes a space frame covered with plastic panels, using Lada Niva chassis and mechanicals.
- Spain – Vehículos Industriales y Agrícolas, S.A (VIASA), absorbed by Ebro trucks, and later sold to Nissan – 1960–1990s For instance built a long-wheelbase version of the CJ-3B from 1955 to 1968.
- Turkey – Tuzla – 1954–1970s
- Venezuela – Valencia Carabobo 1962–2011, 1962 Tejerias Edo Aragua Willys de Venezuela, S.A, 1979–2011 Ensambladora Carabobo C.A. Valencia Edo Carabobo

== Apparel and sponsorships ==
Jeep is also a brand of apparel of outdoor lifestyle sold under license. It is reported that there are between 600 and 1,500 such outlets in China, vastly outnumbering the number of Jeep auto dealers in the country.

In April 2012 Jeep signed a shirt sponsorship deal worth €35 m (US$45.8 m) with Italian football club Juventus.

In August 2014, Jeep signed a sponsorship deal with the Greek football club AEK Athens F.C.

Jeep has been the title sponsor of France's top men's professional basketball league, LNB Pro A, since 2018. Under the deal, the league markets itself as Jeep Élite.

=== Sponsorships ===
- (Indonesia) Dewa United
- (Italy) Juventus
- (Oman) Al-Nasr
- (Singapore) Balestier Khalsa

== See also ==
- Willys MB (and Ford GPW) – the original jeep, created in World War II
- Sport utility vehicle
- Military light utility vehicle
- Land Rover – the British post-war counterpart, that also became a brand
- Jeepney – the most popular buses in the Philippines, originally made from WW II surplus jeeps
- Jeep four-wheel-drive systems
- AMC and Jeep transmissions
- Jeep trail
- Jeep parade
- Jeep Thrills
