= Command and Destroy =

2008 video game

- Developer: Cypron Studios
- Publishers: Destination Software, Zoo Digital Publishing
- Platform: Nintendo DS
- Release: NA: February 15, 2008; EU: March 14, 2008
- Genre: Real time strategy
- Modes: Single-player, Multiplayer

Command and Destroy is a real-time strategy video game developed by Cypron Studios and published by Destination Software Inc. and Zoo Digital Publishing for the Nintendo DS.

== Gameplay ==
Command and Destroy follows a number of the genre's conventions established by a more famous real time strategy series, Command and Conquer. The game's plot follows an alien invasion of Earth. The player completes a series of missions to progress through the game's single player mode, and can choose to play as the humans or the invaders. The player uses soldiers to create a base and gather resources to create more troops. Each mission has specific main and secondary goals to achieve.

The player can control units using the Nintendo DS stylus to either select larger groups of troops or to select individual soldiers. The game uses the stylus to place buildings and other control inputs. The Nintendo DS d-pad can be used to move the camera and the game's cursor, but it requires the use of the stylus to control properly. Command and Destroy does not feature battery save, and requires a password system to continue progress. The game used the Nintendo DS wireless connectivity to allow for multiplayer games.

== Development ==
Command and Destroy began development as a Game Boy Advance game. In 2004, IGN previewed a development build of the game as Cypron Studios tried to sell the game to publishers. A vestige of the game's time as a Game Boy Advance title is the password save system, which was kept even after it was ported during development to the Nintendo DS.

== Reception ==
Reception

Aggregate score
Aggregator	Score
Metacritic	47/100

Review scores
Publication	Score
GameSpot	4.5/10
GameZone	5.6/10
IGN	4/10

The game received "generally unfavorable reviews" according to the review aggregation website Metacritic. IGN's Craig Harris felt that the "awful controls and the even worse save system kill the fun." GameSpot's Austin Light noted that the game's controls were "a vicious cycle of annoyance" and encouraged prospective players to "do something more exciting, like shred documents or watch a screensaver." GameZone's Louis Bedigian noted that the game was a "Command and Conquer clone" that didn't "live up to the legacy of the game it mimics."
