= Yamaha Supercross =

2008 video game

- Developers: Beyond Reality Games; Aurona Technologies (DS)
- Publishers: NA: DSI Games; EU: Zoo Digital Publishing
- Platforms: Wii, Nintendo DS, PlayStation 2, Windows
- Release: November 25, 2008: Windows; NA: November 25, 2008; PAL: April 3, 2009 PlayStation 2; NA: February 20, 2009 Wii; EU: March 6, 2009; NA: March 10, 2009 Nintendo DS; NA: April 7, 2009; PAL: May 22, 2009
- Genre: Racing
- Modes: Single-player, multiplayer

Yamaha Supercross is a video game of the racing genre for the Wii, the Nintendo DS, PC and the PS2 video game consoles published by Zoo Digital in the United Kingdom, and by DSI Games in North America. It was first released in November 2008 in North America. The Wii version is built from the ground up, as opposed to simply being a port of the PS2 version. The game, particularly the Wii version, is heavily criticized by reviewers.

The game is licensed by Yamaha Motor.
