= Rock 'Em Sock 'Em Robots (video game) =

2006 video game

- European box art
- Developer: Full Fat
- Publishers: NA: Destination Software; PAL: Zoo Digital Publishing
- Platform: Game Boy Advance
- Release: NA: October 26, 2006; EU: December 1, 2006
- Genre: Fighting
- Mode: Single-player

Rock 'Em Sock 'Em Robots is a fighting video game developed by Full Fat and published by Destination Software in 2006 for the Game Boy Advance. The game is based heavily on the 1964 toy of the same name, and involves the player taking control of a brightly coloured plastic robot and engaging in close combat with an opposing robot. The first robot to inflict enough damage to cause his opponent's head to pop up is declared the winner. The game is notable for garnering significant negative criticism for its gameplay mechanics and inherent lack of difficulty, poor-quality visuals and repetitive 'button-mashing' gameplay. Chris Adams of gaming website IGN said in his review of the title that 'it is the single worst game I've ever played on the Game Boy Advance'.

== Gameplay ==
As is common to fighting games, Rock 'Em Sock 'Em Robots pits a player-controlled character, in this case, the titular robot, against one controlled by the game engine or another human player. The primary buttons of the Game Boy Advance are used to perform punches, and holding down the buttons allows the player to unleash a more powerful attack. Once the opposing robot's energy has been depleted, the player must press the L and R trigger buttons alternately in order to deliver a knockout blow. The game has multiple different colored characters, each with different stats(however most of them are the same). In the character selection, each robot has a different head, but are all the same in-game.

== Reception ==
Rock 'Em Sock 'Em Robots was panned by critics in general, receiving 1.5/10 from IGN, 2.2/10 from GameSpot, and obtaining an aggregate score of 21/100 on Metacritic. Robots is the lowest scoring GBA title on both IGN and Metacritic. The chief issues reviewers found with the game were bland, repetitive graphics and backgrounds, a lack of challenge in the AI opponents (Frank Provo of GameSpot commented that the CPU 'can be beaten with your eyes closed') and the absence of a multiplayer mode via a Game Link Cable. Critics also noted the lack of well-differentiated gameplay modes, and a resultant lack of longevity in the title, with one commenting that you can 'play through everything the game has to offer in about 20 minutes'.

GameZone gave Robots a mediocre score of 5.4/10, claiming that as the game was intended to be a budget title, the gameplay issues can be overlooked to an extent. Their review summed up the game as having "some small tidbit [sic] of fun if played in short bursts, otherwise it's an exercise in repetition and mindless button mashing".
