= Wade Hixton's Counter Punch =

2004 video game

- North American Game Boy Advance cover art
- Developer(s): Inferno Games, Engine Software
- Publisher(s): NA: Destination Software; EU: Zoo Publishing (GBA)
- Platform(s): Game Boy Advance, digiBlast
- Release: Game Boy Advance: NA: March 16, 2004; EU: October 1, 2004; digiBlast: EU: 2006
- Genre(s): Boxing
- Mode(s): Single-player

Wade Hixton's Counter Punch is a boxing video game developed by Inferno Games and Engine Software and published by Destination Software. It was released for the Game Boy Advance on March 16, 2004 in North America, and on October 1, 2004 in Europe.

== Gameplay ==
Wade Hixton's Counter Punch has been compared favorably to Punch-Out!!.

== Development ==
Wade Hixton's Counter Punch was developed by Inferno Games. Before its release, the game was known as Sadistic Boxing and Sucker Punch.

== Reception ==
Reception

Aggregate score
Aggregator	Score
Metacritic	78/100

Review scores
Publication	Score
Game Informer	7.5/10
GameSpot	7.8/10
GamesTM	7/10
IGN	8/10
NGC Magazine	59%
Nintendo Power	4.1/5

The game received "generally favorable reviews" according to the review aggregation website Metacritic. GameSpot named Wade Hixton's Counter Punch the best Game Boy Advance game of March 2004.

== See also ==
- List of fighting games
