= Arctic Tale (video game) =

2007 video game

- Wii version cover art
- Developer: Atomic Planet Entertainment
- Publishers: NA: DSI Games; PAL: Zoo Digital Publishing
- Director: Darren Falcus
- Producer: Stewart Gilray
- Programmers: James McKay; Daniel Neve
- Artist: Andy Hodgetts
- Composer: Orchestral Media Developments
- Platforms: Wii; Nintendo DS; Game Boy Advance
- Release: Nintendo Wii: NA: October 10, 2007; EU: February 8, 2008; AU: February 28, 2008; Game Boy Advance: NA: October 10, 2007; Nintendo DS: NA: October 25, 2007; EU: February 15, 2008
- Genre: Adventure
- Mode: Single-player

Arctic Tale is a video game for the Nintendo DS, Game Boy Advance and Wii. The game is about trying to survive as a polar bear (adult or young), a walrus, a killer whale, or an Arctic fox. It is loosely based on the National Geographic documentary about Arctic wildlife also called Arctic Tale.

== Reception ==
Reception

Aggregate score
Aggregator	Score
Metacritic	38/100 (DS)

Review scores
Publication	Score
GameZone	6.1/10
IGN	3.5/10

Arctic Tale received mixed reviews for the Wii, but received negative reviews for Nintendo DS and GBA.
