= Battleship/Connect Four/Sorry!/Trouble =

2006 video game

- Developer: Gravity-I
- Publisher: DSI Games
- Platform: Nintendo DS
- Release: NA: August 17, 2006
- Genres: Puzzle game Traditional game
- Modes: Single-player, multiplayer

Battleship/Connect Four/Sorry!/Trouble is a compilation video game developed by British studio Gravity-I and published by DSI Games. It was released for Nintendo DS in North America on August 17, 2006 and is the fifth of six compilation video games of Hasbro board games developed by Gravity-I and released on Nintendo handhelds. The game contains versions of four board games from Milton Bradley and Parker Brothers, which are both Hasbro brands. A sequel, titled Clue/Mouse Trap/Perfection/Aggravation, was released the following year, adapting four more Hasbro board games in a single cartridge: Clue, Mouse Trap, Perfection and Aggravation.

== Games ==
- Battleship - a guessing game traditionally played by two people in which the players take turns in predicting where their opponent has hidden their pieces in attempt to "sink" their battleships before their own are "sunken"
- Connect Four - a strategy game traditionally played by two people in which the players take turns in dropping alternating coloured discs into a seven-column, six-row vertically-suspended grid in attempt to make a line of consecutive pieces in their colour
- Sorry! - a board game based on Parcheesi traditionally played by four people
- Trouble - a board game also based on Parcheesi traditionally played by four people

All four board games except Trouble are also included in the first installment of Electronic Arts' Hasbro Family Game Night series in 2008, with the former two also available in its Nintendo DS port and followup released the following year.
