= Championship Pony =

2008 video game

- Developer(s): Attractive Games
- Publisher(s): Destination Software
- Platform(s): Nintendo DS
- Release: NA: March 20, 2008; AU: August 28, 2008; EU: August 29, 2008
- Genre(s): Simulation
- Mode(s): Single-player

Championship Pony is a virtual life video game by British studio Attractive Games released for Nintendo DS in North America on March 20, 2008. The game allows players to experience equestrianism competition. Competition consists of Cross Country, Show Jumping, and Dressage events.
