= Uno Free Fall =

2006 video game

- Developer(s): Oasis (Mobile); Black Lantern Studios (GBA)
- Publisher(s): Player X (Mobile); DSI Games/Zoo Digital (GBA)
- Platform(s): Game Boy Advance, Mobile phone
- Release: Mobile phone: WW: December 31, 2006; Game Boy Advance: PAL: March 2, 2007; NA: March 6, 2007
- Genre(s): Puzzle
- Mode(s): Single-player, multiplayer

Uno Free Fall is a 2006 puzzle game released on the Game Boy Advance and mobile phone based on the card game Uno. It is also included on the Nintendo DS 3-in-1 game, Uno / Skip-Bo / Uno Freefall. It was released in the PAL Region on March 2, 2007. It was released in North America on March 6, 2007.

== Gameplay ==
Uno Free Fall is a tile matching puzzle game. In its Classic mode, cards will fall from the top of the screen and can be dropped into one of eight columns. Like normal Uno, the cards have to be matched by color, number or symbol in groups of three in order to make them disappear to score points. Wild cards can assume any color. Sometimes, a face down card can appear. These cards cannot be matched, but reveal their value once its surrounding cards disappear or if a Draw 2 or Wild Draw 4 card is played, which can lead to combos. There is a ticking "row" meter on the side of the screen, that gradually drains as time passes, but the use of Skip and Reverse cards can either briefly stop or extend the meter. When the meter runs out, a row of face down cards will be added to the play field. Completing the goal will cause the player to level up, allowing for more points to be scored and causing the meter to drain faster. The game ends when a card reaches the top of the screen.

== Reception ==
Reception

Aggregate scores
Aggregator	Score
GameRankings	62.25%
Metacritic	62/100

Review scores
Publication	Score
GameZone	6.9/10
Nintendojo	5/10

Uno Free Fall received mixed reviews from critics upon release. On Metacritic, the game holds a score of 62/100 based on 4 reviews, indicating "mixed or average reviews". On GameRankings, the game holds a score of 62.25% based on 4 reviews.
