= Betty Boop's Double Shift =

2007 video game

- Developer: Black Lantern Studios
- Publishers: NA: DSI Games; EU: Zoo Digital Publishing
- Platform: Nintendo DS
- Release: NA: October 19, 2007; AU: March 2008; EU: April 18, 2008
- Genre: Puzzle
- Modes: Single Player, multiplayer

Betty Boop's Double Shift is a puzzle game, developed and published by DSI Games. The game is based on the popular Betty Boop cartoon series.

== Gameplay ==
Screenshot of the Diner Dash type play in Betty Boop's Double Shift.

The gameplay is similar to the Diner Dash formula. Betty Boop must move from table to table in order to serve her customers in a timely manner, but if she takes too much time, customers will get angry and leave. After a while, however, Betty Boop's Double Shift changes gears, and becomes a game more akin to Elite Beat Agents. Betty gets called to the front of the diner to sing a song, and the player must tap the stylus on the buttons that correspond to the note she sings.

== Reception ==
Critical reaction has been overwhelmingly negative. Nintendojo, which gave it a 3.0 out of 10, criticized the unresponsive touch controls, and the game's lack of originality. IGN came down on the game for being a clone of Diner Dash and Cake Mania, and gave the game a 4.5 out of 10.
