= Hot Wheels Ultimate Racing =

2007 video game

- North American cover art
- Developer: Raylight Studios
- Publishers: NA/EU: DSI Games; AU: Oxygen Interactive
- Director: Fausto Cardone
- Producers: Massimiliano Di Monda; James Davis; Chip Bumgardner
- Programmer: Fausto Cardone
- Artist: Raffaele Grande
- Composer: Gianni Ricciardi
- Series: Hot Wheels
- Platform: PlayStation Portable
- Release: NA: July 2, 2007; EU: August 24, 2007; AU: September 27, 2007
- Genre: Racing
- Modes: Single-player; Multiplayer

Hot Wheels Ultimate Racing is a 2007 racing video game developed by Italian company Raylight Studios and published by DSI Games for the PlayStation Portable (PSP) exclusively. The game is based on the Hot Wheels toy line which manufactured by Mattel.

== Gameplay ==
Hot Wheels Ultimate Racing features 26 vehicles based on Hot Wheels toy cars. The game features 11 courses, each one resembling real Hot Wheels toy racetracks. The courses are divided across four areas: Death Valley, Jungle, Metropolis, and Volcano. Each level features a major trap or enemy that must be avoided, such as giant boulders, a giant scorpion, and a giant octopus. The player can use turbo boosts to speed up in races, and slow-motion to safely drift around corners; both abilities are depleted as they are used, and can be refilled by landing specific giant jumps or by avoiding the traps and enemies in each level. Performance upgrades, including better acceleration, improved handling, and new tires, can be won from races.

Hot Wheels Ultimate Racing features four gameplay modes. In Quick Race, the player may choose any track on which to race. In Survival mode, the player must win races that become increasingly difficult. In Time Trial mode, the player must race against a time limit. In Collector mode, the player is the sole vehicle and must collect golden medals scattered around a racetrack. The game also includes a local multiplayer mode for up to four people.

== Release ==
Hot Wheels Ultimate Racing was released in North America on June 29, 2007. The game was subsequently released in Europe on August 24, and in Australia on September 27.

== Reception ==
Reception

Aggregate score
Aggregator	Score
Metacritic	60/100

Review scores
Publication	Score
AllGame	2.5/5
GameSpot	6/10
GameZone	8/10
IGN	5.9/10

On review aggregator Metacritic, Hot Wheels Ultimate Racing has a score of 60, indicating "mixed or average reviews".

Michael Pereira of IGN called the gameplay "brutally unforgiving", saying it "is inconsistent with its harshness. You can be way ahead of everyone for two laps, barely nick a corner in the third, and find yourself in last place. It's kind of like F-Zero GX without the tight controls to justify the difficulty. There is no warning of where these cars come from or how they even got so close. Not to mention that your numbered position doesn't actually stay on the screen -- it annoyingly flashes in the upper left hand corner at the most random times. You will have to memorize the courses to get anywhere in this game". Pereira felt that the gameplay's reliance on turbo boosts and slow motion "is actually its biggest problem", and wrote that "all of the graphics are muddy, and it's sometimes hard to tell where the road ends and walls begin. Some of the later stages are worth unlocking and there is some genuine creativity to some of the traps, but the frustration involved in unlocking them might dissuade people. Each stage is a set of races with each race having some requirements to proceed (you must place first, in the top three, etc). However, if you mess up just one race, the entire thing is over and you have to go back to the first race. It's pretty annoying to perform perfectly in two races and then have your hopes and dreams crushed in the third". Pereira also wrote that the game's problems "are magnified" in its Collector mode: "Fall down a hole, and you reset at awkward places and can't grab certain medals until the next lap; some medals can only be grabbed with boost (boost you don't always have); and the worst thing is that you have to redo an entire series if you miss a medal on a track. Oh yes, miss one medal (out of thirty or so) on track No. 4 and you'll have to go back to the first track".

Louis Bedigian of GameZone praised the "great" controls and "super-intense" speed, and was also impressed by the "mind-blowing, jaw-on-the-floor gameplay" that he felt was more typical of a PlayStation 2 game. Bedigian wrote that "this racer, with its Extreme-G-style thrills and F-Zero GX-crushing gameplay is everything a player – young or old – looks for in a racing game. It makes all previous Hot Wheels titles appear to be nothing more than a child's plaything". Bedigian noted the game's complete lack of vehicle damage and wrote "though we love to see explosions and body damage, it's doubtful that any amount of destruction would have made this game better. Chances are it would have taken away from the overall speed of the game, which is generally a non-stop experience". However, Bedigian criticized some of the game's courses for being too dark in color: "Since the PSP has limited picture-tweaking features, you can't lighten the screen to entirely eliminate the darkness. The opposite wouldn't have been better – make the game too bright and you'll drive us crazy. But while this was something I could tolerate, I'm not sure an impatient eight-year-old will feel the same way". Bedigian also criticized the game's small number of courses, but felt that its replayability was adequate compensation.

Frank Prove of GameSpot said the game could be considered a "no-frills knockoff of Need for Speed: Underground. [...] Generally speaking, the racing action is solid. However, there aren't a whole lot of different tracks or competitions, and the 3D graphics don't hold a candle to A-list racers like Ridge Racer or Wipeout". Provo criticized the game's lack of online connectivity for features such as multiplayer, and noted the game's average sound effects and music. Provo also wrote that "aside from the jump ramps and falling rocks, the courses aren't actually all that interesting. The textures are simple and muddy, and there aren't many identifiable landmarks along the raceways". Provo felt that the game's "biggest problem" was its lack of content and concluded that there were better racing games available for the PlayStation Portable, writing that "Hot Wheels Ultimate Racing isn't a bad game by any stretch, but you should probably pass on it unless you're a Hot Wheels fanatic or have a pathological need to get another racer for your PSP".
