= B-17: Fortress in the Sky =

2007 video game

- Developer(s): Skyworks Technologies Inc.
- Publisher(s): DSI Games, Zoo Digital Publishing
- Platform(s): Nintendo DS
- Release: NA: June 19, 2007; EU: September 21, 2007; AU: October 25, 2007
- Genre(s): Action game Combat flight simulator
- Mode(s): Single-player

B-17: Fortress in the Sky is a 2007 combat flight simulator video game for the Nintendo DS developed by American studio Skyworks Technologies Inc. It takes place during World War II in the air war over Germany and the occupied territories in the autumn of 1944.

== Basic details ==
The game has separate missions, with each having two parts. The first part is usually fighting off attacks from other aircraft with machine guns that are placed in different locations on the plane, and the second part is bombing the required targets.

== Reception ==
Reception

Aggregate score
Aggregator	Score
Metacritic	38/100

Review scores
Publication	Score
GameSpot	4/10
GameZone	5/10
IGN	4/10

The game received "unfavorable" reviews according to the review aggregation website Metacritic.
