= Barnyard Blast: Swine of the Night =

2008 video game

- Box art
- Developer(s): Sanuk Games
- Publisher(s): NA: DSI Games; EU: Bigben Interactive, Neko Entertainment
- Platform(s): Nintendo DS
- Release: NA: February 15, 2008; EU: June 3, 2008
- Genre(s): Shooter
- Mode(s): Single-player

Barnyard Blast: Swine of the Night is a 2D shooting game on Nintendo DS developed by Thai studio Sanuk Games, and published by Bigben Interactive and Neko Entertainment in Europe, and DSI Games in America. It is a parodic tribute to famous old-school horror games from the 1980s such as Castlevania and Ghosts 'n Goblins.

== Gameplay ==
The player controls Robert Belmart, an anthropomorphic pig, through six 2D levels:

- A Night Walk in the Graveyard
- The Ancient Castle Ruled by Darkness
- The Swamp Full of Disgusting Creepy-Crawlies
- The Volcano BBQ
- The Forest in the Way
- The Castle of Intolerable Pain

He faces diverse monsters and bosses. He is equipped with 4 weapons: a pistol, a shotgun, a slayer whip and a pack of dynamite.

== Story ==
One Halloween night, young piglet Cliffy Belmart is caught tee-peeing an ancient castle ruled by darkness, and swept inside by horrendous creatures. Instantly aware of the peril, his father Robert Belmart equips with a fully loaded gun and rushes to rescue his son. His interlocutors along the way give him a series of wrong leads, therefore leading him to travel through 6 different worlds before finally finding his son. Dialog is packed with humor and references to famous video game quotes.

== Reception ==
The overall reception was fair, with IGN issuing a rating of 7.2/10 and GameZone issuing a rating of 6.7/10. Reviewers praised the game's sense of humor, while its old-school gameplay drew mixed comments.
