= Snood (video game) =

Puzzle video game first released in 1996

- Game Boy Advance cover
- Developers: Snood, LLC; Rebellion (GBA); Iron Galaxy (iOS)
- Publishers: Snood, LLC; Destination (GBA); EA Mobile (iOS)
- Programmer: Dave Dobson
- Composers: Mark Cooksey (GBA); Chris Brighton (GBA)
- Platforms: Mac OS, Windows, MS-DOS, Game Boy Advance, iOS, Android
- Release: Mac OS: NA: 1996; MS-DOS, Windows: NA: 1999; Game Boy Advance: NA: October 28, 2001; EU: November 30, 2001; iOS: WW: May 8, 2009
- Genre: Puzzle
- Mode: Single-player

Snood is a puzzle video game programmed by Dave Dobson. Snood was released for Mac OS in 1996 as shareware, then for MS-DOS and Microsoft Windows in 1999. An adaptation for Game Boy Advance was developed by Rebellion Developments and released by Destination Software in 2001, and an iOS version was developed by Iron Galaxy and released by EA Mobile on May 8, 2009. Dobson founded Snood, LLC to sell the game.

As in Puzzle Bobble, connecting three or more identical Snoods makes them disappear from the board. When the board is cleared, the level advances. If the Snoods reach the bottom of the screen, a life is lost. There is no time limit in most game modes.

Snood sold in excess of 200,000 units. A sequel, Snood 2: On Vacation, was developed by Gravity-i and released by Destination Software for Game Boy Advance and Nintendo DS in October and November 2005 respectively.

== Gameplay ==
A randomly generated game of Snood

The pieces are called Snoods. There are seven regular Snoods and four Special Snoods. The regular Snoods are Jake (blue), Midoribe (green), Mildred (grey), Spike (purple), Zod (red), Geji (light blue), and Sunny (yellow).

Each turn, the player launches a randomly colored Snood into the playfield. If the Snood lands adjacent to two or more Snoods of the same color, all connecting Snoods of that color vanish and any pieces left unattached beneath those Snoods drop down. The player's score increases with the number of Snoods eliminated. With each Snood launched, a Danger Meter increases and when it reaches the top, all the Snoods in play lower a level. If the Snoods drop past the lowest level of the playing field, the game ends. Releasing Snoods reduces the "Danger Meter".

The first special Snood is called Numbskull, which is shaped like a human skull and is the one type of Snood that is never launched into play. This means it cannot be joined with other Snoods except Wildcard. If Numbskulls are found at the start of a level, they will have to be isolated and dropped by the player to remove them from the board. If the player loses, all the Snoods will turn into Numbskulls, serving as a visual game over message.

The other three special Snood pieces may be launched, and appear at random (and infrequently). One is called Stone which is round and gray, and will always knock out the Snoods adjacent to where it lands. Another is called Wildcard which appears to cycle through all of the regular Snoods and Numbskull and may be used in place of any of them. However, if it does not join any two or more identical pieces together, it will just drop, and if it joins more than one set of two or more identical pieces, even if each set has different pieces, all such sets will be eliminated. The last is called Rowbuilder, a diamond-shaped creature which will fill one row horizontally with regular Snoods. In the registered game, users may control how frequently these special Snoods appear.

Unlike Puzzle Bobble, there is no conventional time limit in Snood modes other than Time Attack, but the player must eliminate Snoods efficiently enough to prevent the gradually descending ceiling from crushing them. Many levels also require Snoods to be ricocheted off of walls in order to get them in the appropriate spot.

== Awards and recognition ==
Steve Wozniak, co-founder of Apple Inc., lists Snood as one of his favorite games.

The "addictive" qualities of the game have been described in an article titled "Snood: At Least It's Not Crack".

Snood received the 2004 Shareware Industry Award for Best Game Action/Arcade on July 17.

Snood has been used regularly by the Ronald McDonald House staff at Stanford University as a tool to teach seriously ill children. It has also been used as palliative for patients who are undergoing chemotherapy, bone marrow transplants and dialysis.

Snood was voted "One of the Top 10 Things on the Web to make you happy", by the Daily News (New York) in April 2009.
