= Jeep Thrills =

2008 video game

- Box art for the PlayStation 2 version of the game. A Jeep Liberty is featured on the left, and a Jeep Wrangler is featured on the right. The Jeep Treo concept car is in the background.
- Developer: Game Sauce
- Publishers: NA: DSI Games; EU: Zoo Digital Publishing
- Platforms: PlayStation 2, Wii
- Release: PlayStation 2: NA: August 5, 2008; EU: November 28, 2008; AU: February 19, 2009; Wii: NA: October 14, 2008; EU: January 23, 2009; AU: February 19, 2009
- Genre: Racing

Jeep Thrills is a video game for the PlayStation 2 and Wii consoles. It was developed by British studio Game Sauce and published by DSI Games. It can be played by 1 or 2 players.

== Gameplay ==
Players will race as any of 18 different historic and modern Jeep models. They can unlock 36 different tracks. Many tracks have different secret passages (such as tunnels), and the tracks encompass a wide variety of terrain, ranging from Tundra to Jungle to Mountain oriented environments.

The game's vehicle selection consists entirely of past and present Jeep models, including various concept vehicles.
