= DSI Games =

American video game publisher and developer

Destination Software Inc.
- Industry: Video games
- Founded: January 2001
- Defunct: December 2007
- Fate: Acquired by GreenScreen Interactive Software
- Headquarters: Moorestown, New Jersey, United States

Destination Software Inc., better known as DSI Games, was an American video game publisher and video game developer. Based in Moorestown, New Jersey, DSI is best known for publishing SNOOD. DSI published titles for the Nintendo DS, Wii, Game Boy Advance and PlayStation 2.

In 2001, the company had an agreement with Digital Worldwide to publish its titles outside of Europe. In earlier years, the company had contracts with developers like Take-Two Interactive Software, Electronic Arts, and Namco to publish its title library to the Game Boy Advance. In 2003, the company adopted the moniker DSI Games, after the first two years of using the company's full name.

In December 2007, Destination Software became the North American branch of Zoo Games after being acquired by GreenScreen Interactive Software (along with Zoo Digital Publishing) and renamed Zoo Publishing, Inc. The company no longer produced titles under its previous Destination Software name. Between 2008 and 2011 Zoo Publishing released around 60 games. In 2013 all indiePub and Zoo companies were closed.
