= List of Nintendo DS games (0–C) =

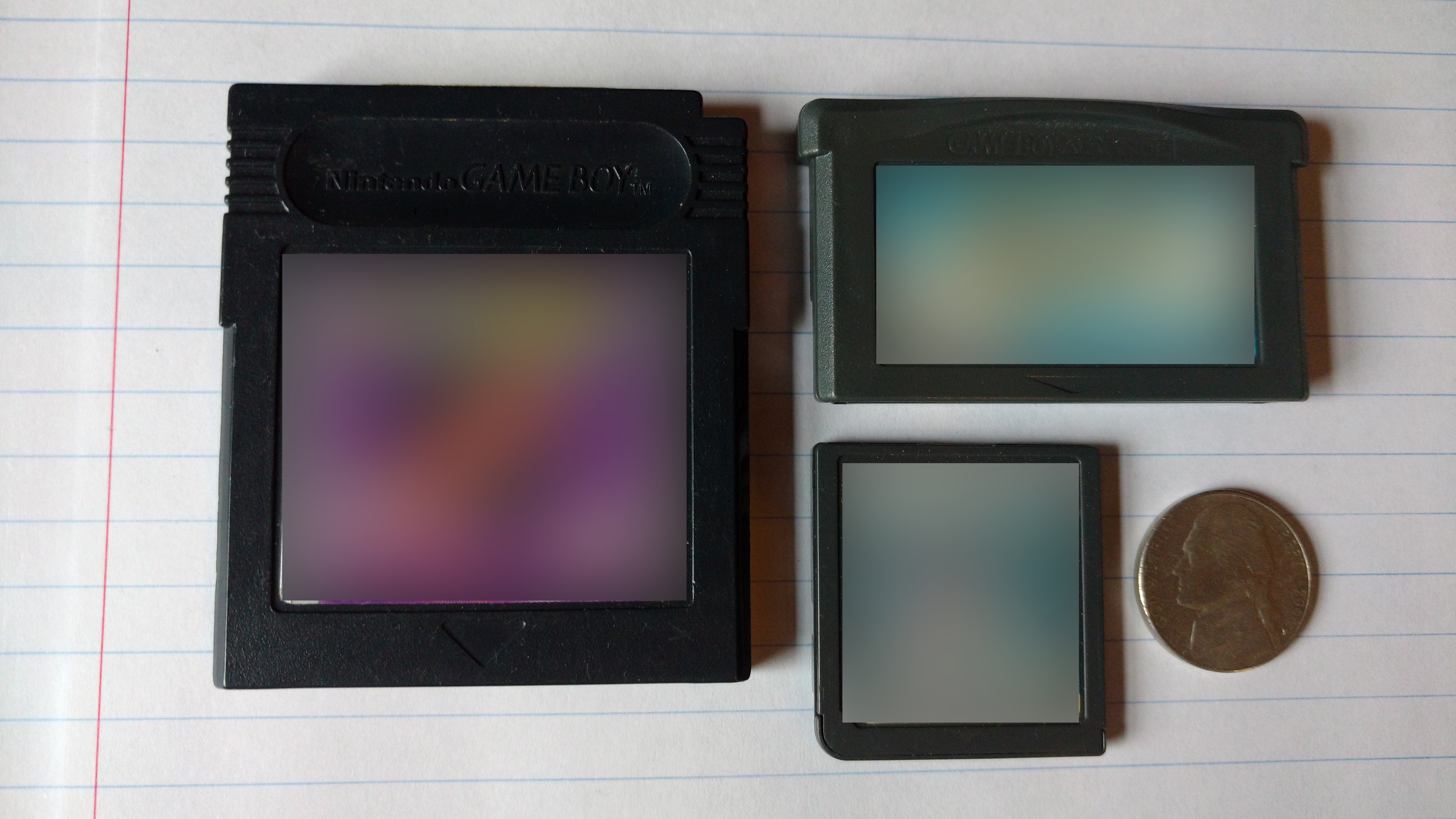
Clockwise from left: A Game Boy game cartridge, a Game Boy Advance game cartridge, and a Nintendo DS game card. On the far right is a United States Nickel shown for scale.

This is a list of physical video games for the Nintendo DS, DS Lite, and DSi handheld game consoles. It does not include games released on DSiWare or the iQue DS. The last game for the Nintendo DS, Big Hero 6: Battle in the Bay, was released on October 28, 2014.

== Games ==
There are currently 3240 games in this table across all pages: 0 to C, D to I, J to P, and Q to Z.

Title	Developer(s)	Publisher(s)	First released	JP	NA	EU	AU
007: Quantum of Solace	Vicarious Visions	Activision	October 31, 2008 (EU)	No	Yes	Yes	Yes
1 vs. 100 (Europe/Australia); 1 Contre 100^{FR} 1 Gegen 100^{DE}	Gimagin	Mindscape	April 30, 2008 (EU/AUS)	No	No	Yes	Yes
1 vs. 100 (US)	ECi	Destination Software	July 3, 2008 (NA)	No	Yes	No	No
10 Voor Taal	Endemol	Foreign Media	June 30, 2009 (EU)	No	No	Yes	No
100 All-Time Favorites	Ubisoft	Ubisoft	October 27, 2009 (EU)	Yes	Yes	Yes	No
100 Classic Games	Easy Interactive	rondomedia	April 8, 2011 (EU)	No	No	Yes	No
100 Kiri Golf DS	GungHo	GungHo	October 23, 2008 (JP)	Yes	No	No	No
1000 Bornes	Mad Monkey Studio	Mindscape	October 16, 2008 (EU)	No	No	Yes	No
1001 Crosswords	Mastertronic	Mastertronic	November 2, 2012 (EU)	No	No	Yes	No
1001 Touch Games	Avanquest Software	Maximum Family Games	August 26, 2011 (EU)	No	Yes	Yes	No
101-in-1 Explosive Megamix	Nordcurrent	NA: Atlus; EU: Nordcurrent	November 28, 2008 (EU)	No	Yes	Yes	No
101-in-1 Sports Megamix	Nordcurrent	Atlus	September 14, 2010 (NA)	Yes	Yes	Yes	No
11 Card Games	Foreign Media	rondomedia	April 23, 2010 (EU)	No	No	Yes	No
12 Family Games	Phoenix Games	Phoenix Games	December 1, 2008 (EU)	No	No	Yes	No
13-Sai no Hello Work DS	Digital Works Entertainment	Digital Works Entertainment	May 29, 2008 (EU)	Yes	No	No	No
1500DS Spirits: Mahjong V	Tasuke	Tasuke	December 3, 2009 (JP)	Yes	No	No	No
1500DS Spirits: Shogi V	Tasuke	Tasuke	December 3, 2009 (JP)	Yes	No	No	No
1500DS Spirits Vol. 1: Mahjong	Tasuke	Tasuke	August 9, 2007 (JP)	Yes	No	No	No
1500DS Spirits Vol. 2: Shogi	Tasuke	Tasuke	August 9, 2007 (JP)	Yes	No	No	No
1500DS Spirits Vol. 3: Block Kuzushi	Tasuke	Tasuke	August 9, 2007 (JP)	Yes	No	No	No
1500DS Spirits Vol. 4: Reversi	Tasuke	Tasuke	August 9, 2007 (JP)	Yes	No	No	No
1500DS Spirits Vol. 5: Hanafuda	Tasuke	Tasuke	August 9, 2007 (JP)	Yes	No	No	No
1500DS Spirits Vol. 6: Trump	Tasuke	Tasuke	November 22, 2007 (JP)	Yes	No	No	No
1500DS Spirits Vol. 7: Chess	Tasuke	Tasuke	November 22, 2007 (JP)	Yes	No	No	No
1500DS Spirits Vol. 8: Darts	Tasuke	Tasuke	November 22, 2007 (JP)	Yes	No	No	No
1500DS Spirits Vol. 9: Futari-uchi Mahjong	Tasuke	Tasuke	November 22, 2007 (JP)	Yes	No	No	No
1500DS Spirits Vol. 10: Igo	Tasuke	Tasuke	May 15, 2008 (JP)	Yes	No	No	No
18 Classic Card Games; 18 Card Games^{EU}	Destineer	Destineer	November 16, 2010 (NA)	No	Yes	Yes	No
50 Classic Games	Cerasus Media	Destineer	March 8, 2010 (NA)	No	Yes	Yes	No
50 More Classic Games	Destineer	Destineer	May 12, 2011 (NA)	No	Yes	No	No
7 Wonders II	MumboJumbo	Avanquest Software	October 30, 2009 (EU)	No	Yes	Yes	No
7 Wonders of the Ancient World	Hot Lava Games	MumboJumbo	September 17, 2007 (NA)	No	Yes	Yes	No
7 Wonders: Treasures of Seven	Avanquest Software	Avanquest Software	August 12, 2011 (NA)	No	Yes	Yes	No
7th Dragon	imageepoch	Sega	March 5, 2009 (JP)	Yes	No	No	No
8Ball Allstars	Code Monkeys	Oxygen Games	August 7, 2009 (EU)	No	Yes	Yes	No
A Witch's Tale	Hit Maker	Nippon Ichi Software	May 28, 2009 (JP)	Yes	Yes	No	No
A-Ressha de Ikou DS	Artdink	Artdink	April 3, 2009 (JP)	Yes	No	No	No
Ace Attorney Investigations: Miles Edgeworth	Capcom	Capcom	May 28, 2009 (JP)	Yes	Yes	Yes	Yes
Actua Pool	FrontLine Studios	Zoo Digital Publishing	January 1, 2007 (AU)	No	No	Yes	Yes
Adibou Aventure : J'explore le corps humain	Mindscape	Mindscape	2008 (EU)	No	No	Yes	No
Adibou: Je Joue a Lire et a Compter 6-7 Ans	Mindscape	Mindscape	2008 (EU)	No	No	Yes	No
Adibou: Je Joue avec les Lettres et les Nombres	Mindscape	Mindscape	2008 (EU)	No	No	Yes	No
Advance Wars: Days of Ruin	Intelligent Systems	Nintendo	January 21, 2008 (NA)	Yes	Yes	Yes	Yes
Advance Wars: Dual Strike	Intelligent Systems	Nintendo	August 22, 2005 (NA)	Yes	Yes	Yes	Yes
Adventure Time: Hey Ice King! Why'd You Steal Our Garbage?!!	WayForward Technologies	D3 Publisher	November 20, 2012 (NA)	No	Yes	No	No
Adventures of Pinocchio	Phoenix Games	Phoenix Games	May 8, 2008 (EU)	No	No	Yes	No
AFL Mascot Manor	Wicked Witch Software	Tru Blu Games	July 2, 2009 (AUS)	No	No	No	Yes
Again	Cing	Tecmo	December 10, 2009 (JP)	Yes	Yes	No	No
Agatha Christie: The ABC Murders	DreamCatcher Games	DreamCatcher Games	November 12, 2009 (NA)	No	Yes	Yes	No
Age of Empires: Mythologies	Griptonite Games	THQ	November 24, 2008 (NA)	No	Yes	Yes	Yes
Age of Empires: The Age of Kings	Backbone Entertainment	Majesco	February 14, 2006 (NA)	No	Yes	Yes	Yes
Aibou DS	Tecmo	Tecmo	March 5, 2009 (JP)	Yes	No	No	No
Air Traffic Chaos	Majesco	Majesco	July 30, 2008 (NA)	Yes	Yes	Yes	No
Akagawa Jirou Mystery: Tsuki no Hikari	Marvelous Entertainment	Marvelous Entertainment	November 6, 2008 (JP)	Yes	No	No	No
Akagawa Jirou Mystery: Yasoukyoku - Hon ni Manekareta Satsujin	Marvelous Entertainment	Marvelous Entertainment	February 8, 2008 (JP)	Yes	No	No	No
Akai Ito Destiny DS	Alchemist	Alchemist	March 26, 2009 (JP)	Yes	No	No	No
Akai Ito DS	Alchemist	Alchemist	December 25, 2008 (JP)	Yes	No	No	No
Akko de Pon! Ikasama Hourouki	Success	Success	April 24, 2008 (JP)	Yes	No	No	No
Akko ni Omakase! Brain Shock	Taito	Taito	December 7, 2006 (JP)	Yes	No	No	No
Akogare Girls Collection: Lovely Youchien Nikki	Open Sesame	Creative Core	November 19, 2009 (JP)	Yes	No	No	No
Akogare Girls Collection: Mister Donut DS	Open Sesame	Columbia Music Entertainment	December 9, 2010 (JP)	Yes	No	No	No
Akogare Girls Collection: Ohanaya-San Monogatari	Columbia Music Entertainment	Columbia Music Entertainment	June 30, 2011 (JP)	Yes	No	No	No
Akogare Girls Collection: Pika Pika Nurse Monogatari	Nippon Columbia	Nippon Columbia	August 4, 2011 (JP)	Yes	No	No	No
Akogare Girls Collection: Suteki ni Nurse Days	Open Sesame	Creative Core	August 6, 2009 (JP)	Yes	No	No	No
ALC no 10-Punkan Eigo Master: Chuukyuu (Note: Primarily an English-learning application, though it includes three learning mini-games.)	Interchannel	Interchannel	March 8, 2007 (JP)	Yes	No	No	No
ALC no 10-Punkan Eigo Master: Joukyuu (Note: Primarily an English-learning application, though it includes three learning mini-games.)	Interchannel	Interchannel	March 8, 2007 (JP)	Yes	No	No	No
ALC no 10-Punkan Eigo Master: Shokyuu (Note: Primarily an English-learning application, though it includes three learning mini-games.)	Interchannel	Interchannel	March 8, 2007 (JP)	Yes	No	No	No
Alex Rider: Stormbreaker	Altron	THQ	July 7, 2006 (PAL)	No	Yes	Yes	Yes
Alexandra Ledermann: Summer Camp Adventures	Ubisoft	Ubisoft	October 1, 2009 (EU)	No	No	Yes	No
Alice in Wonderland	Étranges Libellules	Disney Interactive Studios	March 2, 2010 (NA)	No	Yes	Yes	Yes
Aliens in the Attic	Engine Software	Playlogic	August 4, 2009 (NA)	No	Yes	Yes	Yes
Aliens: Infestation	WayForward, Gearbox Software	Sega	September 29, 2011 (AUS)	No	Yes	Yes	Yes
All Kamen Rider: Rider Generation	7thChord	Bandai Namco Games	August 4, 2011 (JP)	Yes	No	No	No
All Kamen Rider: Rider Generation 2	Bandai Namco Games	Bandai Namco Games	August 2, 2012 (JP)	Yes	No	No	No
All Star Cheer Squad	Gorilla Systems	THQ	November 13, 2008 (PAL)	No	Yes	Yes	Yes
Allez Raconte	OUAT Entertainment	Bigben Interactive	May 31, 2011 (EU)	No	No	Yes	No
Allied Ace Pilots	Ghostlight	Ghostlight; Midas Interactive Entertainment	September 19, 2008 (EU)	No	No	Yes	No
Alpha and Omega	Storm City Games	Lionsgate	September 14, 2010 (NA)	No	Yes	Yes	No
Alssongdalssong - Myeonghwatamheom DS	Justone Interactive	Justone Interactive	May 14, 2009 (KR)	Yes	No	No	No
Alvin and the Chipmunks	Brash Entertainment	Brash Entertainment; Eidos Interactive	December 4, 2007 (NA)	No	Yes	Yes	No
Alvin and the Chipmunks: Chipwrecked	Behavior Interactive	Majesco	November 15, 2011 (NA)	No	Yes	No	No
Alvin and the Chipmunks: The Squeakquel	ImaginEngine	Majesco	December 1, 2009 (NA)	No	Yes	No	No
The Aly & AJ Adventure	Frame Studios Interactive	Destination Software	October 15, 2007 (NA)	No	Yes	Yes	No
Amazing Adventures: The Forgotten Ruins	Black Lantern Studios	PopCap Games	November 11, 2008 (NA)	No	Yes	Yes	No
The Amazing Spider-Man	Other Ocean Interactive	Activision	June 26, 2012 (NA)	No	Yes	Yes	Yes
America's Next Top Model	Arts Software	Eidos Interactive	June 7, 2010 (NA)	No	Yes	Yes	No
America's Next Top Model (2008)	dtp Young Entertainment AG	dtp Young Entertainment AG	November 7, 2008 (EU)	No	No	Yes	No
American Girl: Julie Finds a Way	Webfoot Technologies	THQ	December 3, 2007 (NA)	No	Yes	No	No
American Girl: Kit Mystery Challenge!	Webfoot Technologies	THQ	June 23, 2008 (NA)	No	Yes	No	No
AMF Bowling Pinbusters!	4J Studios	ZeniMax Media	July 7, 2008 (NA)	No	Yes	Yes	No
Amici	Pub Company s.r.l.	Black Bean Games	May 15, 2009 (EU)	No	No	Yes	No
Angel Cat Sugar	Rising Star Games	Rising Star Games	October 16, 2009 (EU)	No	No	Yes	No
Angelique Duet	Koei	Koei	April 6, 2006 (JP)	Yes	No	No	No
Animal Boxing	Gammick Entertainment	Destineer, Gammick Entertainment	October 28, 2008 (NA)	No	Yes	Yes	No
Animal Crossing: Wild World	Nintendo	Nintendo	November 23, 2005 (JP)	Yes	Yes	Yes	Yes
Animal Genius	Big Blue Bubble	Scholastic, Ubisoft	September 25, 2007 (NA)	No	Yes	Yes	No
Animal Life: Africa	UIG Entertainment	UIG Entertainment	November 17, 2011 (PAL)	No	No	Yes	Yes
Animal Life: Australia	UIG Entertainment	UIG Entertainment	November 17, 2011 (PAL)	No	No	Yes	Yes
Animal Life: Dinosaurs	UIG Entertainment	UIG Entertainment	August 17, 2009 (PAL)	No	No	Yes	Yes
Animal Life: Eurasia	UIG Entertainment	UIG Entertainment	October 14, 2009 (PAL)	No	No	Yes	Yes
Animal Life: North America	UIG Entertainment	UIG Entertainment	October 14, 2009 (PAL)	No	No	Yes	Yes
Animal Paradise	Agatsuma Entertainment	Empire Interactive	April 26, 2007 (JP)	Yes	Yes	Yes	No
Animal Paradise Wild	Empire Interactive	Zoo Games	October 6, 2009 (NA)	No	Yes	No	No
Animal Planet: Emergency Vets	Silverbirch Studios	Activision	March 13, 2009 (NA)	No	Yes	No	No
Animal Planet: Vet Life	Silverbirch Studios	Activision	September 15, 2009 (NA)	No	Yes	No	No
Animal World: Big Cats	UIG Entertainment	UIG Entertainment	2010 (PAL)	No	No	Yes	No
Animal World: Dinosaurs	UIG Entertainment	UIG Entertainment	2010 (PAL)	No	No	Yes	No
Animaniacs: Lights, Camera, Action	Ignition Entertainment	Warthog	August 4, 2005 (EU)	No	No	Yes	No
AniMates; My Little Flufties^{EU}	DK-Games	DreamCatcher Games, Lexicon Entertainment	July 14, 2007 (NA)	No	Yes	Yes	No
Ankh: Curse of the Scarab King	VIS Entertainment	Xider Games	September 17, 2008 (EU)	No	No	Yes	No
Anna & die Liebe	SevenOne Intermedia	SevenOne Intermedia	2008 (PAL)	No	No	Yes	No
Annie M.G. Schmidt's Pluk van de Petteflet	Foreign Media	Foreign Media	2008 (PAL)	No	No	Yes	No
Anno 1701: Dawn of Discovery	Keen Games	Disney Interactive Studios, Ubisoft	July 13, 2007 (EU)	No	Yes	Yes	No
Another Time Another Leaf: Kagami no Naka no Tantei	Killaware	Arc System Works	April 23, 2009 (JP)	Yes	No	No	No
Anpanman to Asobo: ABC Kyoushitsu	Digital Kids	Agatsuma Entertainment	May 1, 2008 (JP)	Yes	No	No	No
Anpanman to Asobo: Aiueo Kyoushitsu	Digital Kids	Agatsuma Entertainment	December 7, 2006 (JP)	Yes	No	No	No
Anpanman to Asobu: Aiueo Kyoushitsu DX	Digital Kids	Agatsuma Entertainment	December 17, 2009 (JP)	Yes	No	No	No
Anpanman to Touch de Waku Waku Training	Digital Kids	Agatsuma Entertainment	September 3, 2009 (JP)	Yes	No	No	No
Ant Nation	Konami	Konami	July 14, 2009 (NA)	No	Yes	Yes	No
Ao-Don DS: Hanabi no Goku & Hanabi no Takumi	Commseed	Commseed	June 17, 2009 (JP)	Yes	No	No	No
Apassionata: A Passionate Horse-Show - My Show	B-Alive	RTL Enterprises GmbH	March 2, 2009 (EU)	No	No	Yes	No
Apathy: Narugami Gakuen Toshi Densetsu Tantei Kyoku	Del	Arc System Works	October 25, 2007 (JP)	Yes	No	No	No
Apollo Justice: Ace Attorney	Capcom	Capcom	April 12, 2007 (JP)	Yes	Yes	Yes	Yes
Appare! Shogi Jiisan: Washi to Shoubu ja	Arioka	Success	November 24, 2005 (JP)	Yes	No	No	No
Aqua Panic!	EKO Software	Ubisoft	October 6, 2009 (EU)	No	Yes	Yes	No
Aquarium By DS; Kokoro ga Uruou Birei Aquarium DS: Tetra - Guppy - Angelfish^{JP}	Destineer	Bold Games	March 14, 2008 (US)	Yes	Yes	Yes	No
Arabians Lost: The Engagement on Desert	Quinrose	Prototype	September 10, 2009 (KR)	Yes	No	No	No
Aranuri: Badachingudeulkkwa hamkke Mandeuneun Sesang	Samg Games	Samg Games	August 13, 2010 (KR)	Yes	No	No	No
Arashi no Yoruni	Hyde	TDK Core	December 22, 2005 (JP)	Yes	No	No	No
Arctic Tale	Atomic Planet Entertainment	Destination Software, Zoo Digital Publishing	October 8, 2007 (NA)	No	Yes	Yes	Yes
Are You Smarter Than a 5th Grader?	AWE Games	THQ	October 12, 2007 (NA)	No	Yes	Yes	Yes
Are You Smarter Than a 5th Grader?: Back to School	ImaginEngine	THQ	November 2, 2010 (NA)	No	Yes	Yes	Yes
Are You Smarter Than a 5th Grader?: Game Time	AWE Games	THQ	October 26, 2009 (NA)	No	Yes	Yes	Yes
Are You Smarter Than a 5th Grader?: Make the Grade	AWE Games	THQ	October 20, 2008 (NA)	No	Yes	Yes	Yes
Arkanoid DS	Taito Corporation	Square Enix, Taito Corporation	December 6, 2007 (JP)	Yes	Yes	Yes	Yes
Army Men: Soldiers of Misfortune	Zoo Games	Zoo Games	October 10, 2008 (NA)	No	Yes	No	No
Around the World in 80 Days	PlayV	PlayV	March 5, 2009 (EU)	No	No	Yes	No
Art Puzzle	Tivola	Tivola	2010 (EU)	No	No	Yes	No
Arthur and the Invisibles: The Game	Étranges Libellules, Neko Entertainment	Atari	January 9, 2007 (NA)	No	Yes	Yes	Yes
Arthur and the Revenge of Maltazard	Ubisoft	Ubisoft	September 24, 2010 (EU)	No	No	Yes	No
ASH: Archaic Sealed Heat	Mistwalker, Racjin	Nintendo	October 4, 2007 (JP)	Yes	No	No	No
Asoberu Eigo: Word Magic (Note: Primarily an English-vocabulary learning application, though it includes crossword puzzles and Word Stone, a falling-block word game.)	Shingakusha	Shingakusha	December 25, 2008 (JP)	Yes	No	No	No
Asonde Igo ga Sara ni Tsuyokunaru: Ginsei Igo DS Chuukyuuhen	SilverStar	Electronic Arts	June 18, 2009 (JP)	Yes	No	No	No
Asonde Igo ga Tsuyoku naru!! Ginsei Igo DS	SilverStar	Electronic Arts	March 1, 2009 (JP)	Yes	No	No	No
Asonde Shogi ga Tsuyoku naru!! Ginsei Shogi DS	SilverStar	Electronic Arts	March 1, 2007 (JP)	Yes	No	No	No
Asphalt Urban GT	Gameloft	Ubisoft, Taito	November 17, 2004 (NA)	Yes	Yes	Yes	Yes
Asphalt: Urban GT 2	Game Source, Virtuous	Ubisoft	November 14, 2006 (NA)	No	Yes	Yes	Yes
Assassin's Creed: Altaïr's Chronicles	Gameloft	Ubisoft	February 5, 2008 (NA)	No	Yes	Yes	Yes
Assassin's Creed II: Discovery	Griptonite Games	Ubisoft	November 17, 2009 (NA)	No	Yes	Yes	Yes
Asterix & Obelix XXL 2 - Mission: Wifix	Mistic Software, Tate Interactive	Atari	November 17, 2006 (EU)	No	No	Yes	No
Asterix at the Olympic Games	Étranges Libellules	Atari	February 29, 2008 (PAL)	No	No	Yes	Yes
Asterix Brain Trainer	Little Worlds Studio	Atari	June 27, 2008 (PAL)	No	No	Yes	Yes
Asterix: These Romans Are Crazy!	Ubisoft	Ubisoft	October 29, 2009 (PAL)	No	No	Yes	No
Astro Boy: The Video Game	Art	D3 Publisher	October 20, 2009 (NA)	No	Yes	No	No
Astro Invaders	Zoo Games	Zoo Games	July 6, 2010 (NA)	No	Yes	No	No
Astrology (Note: Primarily an astrology application, though it includes astrology-themed mini-games.)	Codemasters	Black Bean Games	July 3, 2009 (EU)	No	No	Yes	No
Astrology DS (Note: Primarily an astrology application, though it includes three astrology-themed mini-games.)	Sproing Media	Deep Silver	September 22, 2009 (NA)	No	Yes	Yes	No
Atama de Do! Kotenko Kotenko	Dorart	Dorart	March 29, 2007 (JP)	Yes	No	No	No
Atama no Kaiten no Training: Rubik's Cube & Chou Yuumei Puzzle Tachi	Digital Works Entertainment	Digital Works Entertainment	April 26, 2007 (JP)	Yes	No	No	No
Atama o Kitaete Asobu Taisen Yajirushi Puzzle: Puppyinu Vector One	Megacyber	Megacyber	June 29, 2006 (JP)	Yes	No	No	No
Atari Greatest Hits Volume 1	Atari	Code Mystics	November 2, 2010 (NA)	No	Yes	Yes	No
Atari Greatest Hits Volume 2	Atari	Code Mystics	March 8, 2011 (NA)	No	Yes	No	No
Atelier Annie: Alchemists of Sera Island	Gust Corporation	Nippon Ichi Software	March 12, 2009 (NA)	Yes	Yes	No	No
Atsumare! Power Pro Kun no DS Koushien	Konami	Konami	August 3, 2006 (JP)	Yes	No	No	No
ATV: Quad Frenzy	Skyworks Technologies	Majesco, THQ	November 14, 2005 (NA)	No	Yes	Yes	No
ATV: Quad Kings	Beyond Reality	Storm City Games	March 2, 2010 (NA)	No	Yes	No	No
ATV: Thunder Ridge Riders / Monster Truck Mayhem (Note: A compilation of Nintendo DS ports of the original Game Boy Advance games.)	Destination Software	Destination Software	August 15, 2007 (NA)	No	Yes	No	No
ATV: Wild Ride	Renegade Kid	Destineer	March 30, 2011 (NA)	No	Yes	No	No
Au pays des PooYoos: Activites d'eveil	Lexis Numerique	Micro Application	September 17, 2009 (EU)	No	No	Yes	No
Autoescuela Aproueba Conmigo (Note: Primarily an application, though it includes several mini-games.)	Freedom Factory Studios	Micronet	September 21, 2009 (EU)	No	No	Yes	No
Avalon Code	Matrix Software	Marvelous Interactive; Rising Star Games; Xseed Games	November 1, 2008 (JP)	Yes	Yes	Yes	Yes
Avatar: The Last Airbender	Tose	THQ	October 10, 2006 (NA)	No	Yes	Yes	Yes
Avatar: The Last Airbender – Into the Inferno	Halfbrick	THQ	October 17, 2008 (PAL)	No	Yes	Yes	Yes
Avatar: The Last Airbender – The Burning Earth	Tose	THQ	October 16, 2007 (NA)	No	Yes	Yes	Yes
Away: Shuffle Dungeon	Artoon, Mistwalker	AQ Interactive, Majesco, Virgin Play	October 16, 2008 (JP)	Yes	Yes	Yes	Yes
B Team: Metal Cartoon Squad	Most Wanted Entertainment	Virgin Play	February 20, 2009 (PAL)	No	No	Yes	No
B-17: Fortress in the Sky	Zoo Digital Publishing	Destination Software	June 19, 2007 (NA)	No	Yes	Yes	No
Baby Life	Pasta Games	Deep Silver	November 28, 2008 (NA)	No	No	Yes	No
Baby Pals	Brain Toys	Crave Entertainment, THQ	November 19, 2007 (NA)	No	Yes	Yes	No
Baby Wildkatzen	B-Alive	TREVA Entertainment	July 21, 2009 (EU)	No	No	Yes	No
Babysitting Mania	iWin	Majesco	September 23, 2008 (NA)	No	Yes	Yes	No
The Bachelor: The Video Game	Ludia	Warner Bros. Interactive Entertainment	August 25, 2010 (NA)	No	Yes	No	No
Back at the Barnyard: Slop Bucket Games	Firemint	THQ	October 20, 2008 (NA)	No	Yes	Yes	Yes
Backyard Baseball '09	Humongous Entertainment	Atari	March 25, 2008 (NA)	No	Yes	No	No
Backyard Baseball '10	Humongous Entertainment	Atari	March 26, 2009 (NA)	No	Yes	No	No
Backyard Basketball	Humongous Entertainment	Atari	September 25, 2007 (NA)	No	Yes	No	No
Backyard Football	Humongous Entertainment	Atari	October 23, 2007 (NA)	No	Yes	No	No
Backyard Football '09	Humongous Entertainment	Atari	October 21, 2008 (NA)	No	Yes	No	No
Backyard Hockey	Mistic Software	Humongous Entertainment	October 2, 2007 (NA)	No	Yes	No	No
Backyard Sports: Rookie Rush	Powerhead Games	Atari	October 20, 2010 (NA)	No	Yes	No	No
Backyard Sports: Sandlot Sluggers	Powerhead Games	Atari	May 25, 2010 (NA)	No	Yes	No	No
The Backyardigans	Take-Two Interactive	2K Play	September 26, 2010 (NA)	No	Yes	No	Yes
Bakegyamon: Ayakashi Fighting	Aspect	Takara Tomy	March 1, 2007 (JP)	Yes	No	No	No
The Bakudan Shori-Han	Tomcat System	D3 Publisher	July 10, 2008 (JP)	Yes	No	No	No
Bakugan Battle Brawlers	Now Production	Activision	October 20, 2009 (NA)	No	Yes	Yes	Yes
Bakugan Battle Brawlers: Battle Trainer	Now Production	Activision	March 23, 2010 (NA)	No	Yes	Yes	No
Bakugan: Defenders of the Core	Now Production	Activision, Sega	October 26, 2010 (NA)	Yes	Yes	Yes	Yes
Bakugan: Rise of the Resistance	Activision	Activision	September 23, 2011 (EU)	No	Yes	Yes	No
Bakuman: Mangaka e no Michi	Bandai Namco Games	Bandai Namco Games	December 15, 2011 (JP)	Yes	No	No	No
Bakumatsu Renka: Shinsengumi DS	D3 Publisher	D3 Publisher	November 27, 2008 (JP)	Yes	No	No	No
Bakusou Dekotora Densetsu Black	Spike	Spike	March 20, 2008 (JP)	Yes	No	No	No
Balloon Pop	Tommo	UFO Interactive	October 23, 2009 (NA)	No	Yes	No	No
Balls of Fury	Black Lantern Studios	Destination Software; Zoo Digital Publishing	September 9, 2007 (NA)	No	Yes	Yes	No
Band Hero	Vicarious Visions	RedOctane	November 3, 2009 (NA)	No	Yes	Yes	Yes
Bangai-O Spirits	Treasure	D3 Publisher, Entertainment Software Publishing	March 19, 2008 (JP)	Yes	Yes	Yes	No
Barbie and the Three Musketeers	WayForward Technologies	Activision	November 3, 2009 (NA)	No	Yes	Yes	Yes
Barbie as the Island Princess	Human Soft	Activision	October 30, 2007 (NA)	No	Yes	Yes	No
Barbie Dreamhouse Party	Torus Games	Little Orbit	November 12, 2013 (NA)	No	Yes	Yes	No
Barbie Fashion Show: An Eye for Style	Cyber Planet Interactive	Activision	September 23, 2008 (NA)	No	Yes	Yes	Yes
Barbie: Groom and Glam Pups	Game Machine Studios	THQ	November 16, 2010 (NA)	No	Yes	Yes	Yes
Barbie Horse Adventures: Riding Camp	Farmind, Pixel Tales	Activision	October 21, 2008 (NA)	No	Yes	Yes	No
Barbie in the 12 Dancing Princesses	WayForward Technologies	Activision	January 14, 2007 (NA)	No	Yes	Yes	No
Barbie: Jet, Set & Style!	Game Machine Studios	THQ	September 20, 2011 (NA)	No	Yes	Yes	No
Barnyard Blast: Swine of the Night	Sanuk Games	Bigben Interactive, Destination Software, Neko Entertainment	February 15, 2008 (NA)	No	Yes	Yes	No
Batman: The Brave and The Bold: The Videogame	WayForward Technologies	Warner Bros. Interactive Entertainment	September 7, 2010 (NA)	No	Yes	Yes	Yes
Battle of Giants: Dinosaurs	Ubisoft Quebec	Ubisoft	October 14, 2008 (NA)	No	Yes	Yes	Yes
Battle of Giants: Dragons	Ubisoft Quebec	Ubisoft	September 29, 2009 (NA)	No	Yes	Yes	Yes
Battle of Giants: Mutant Insects	Ubisoft Quebec	Ubisoft	March 2, 2010 (NA)	No	Yes	Yes	Yes
Battles of Prince of Persia	Ubisoft Montreal	Ubisoft	December 6, 2005 (NA)	No	Yes	Yes	No
Battle Spirits: Digital Starter	Bandai Namco Games	Bandai Namco Games	August 5, 2010 (JP)	Yes	No	No	No
Battleship	Magic Pockets	Activision	April 20, 2012 (EU)	No	Yes	Yes	No
Battleship/Connect Four/Sorry!/Trouble	Gravity-I	Destination Software	August 17, 2006 (NA)	No	Yes	No	No
Beastly Frantic Foto	7Raven Studios	Storm City Games	March 10, 2011 (NA)	No	Yes	No	No
Beat City	Universomo	THQ	April 20, 2010 (NA)	No	Yes	Yes	No
Beat the Intro	Mindscape	Mindscape	March 31, 2010 (EU)	No	No	Yes	No
The Bee Game	Midway Games	Midway Games	October 15, 2007 (NA)	No	Yes	No	No
Bee Movie Game	Vicarious Visions	Activision	November 16, 2007 (PAL)	No	Yes	Yes	No
Beetle Junior DS	Snapdragon Games	Intenium	March 27, 2008 (EU)	No	No	Yes	No
Bejeweled 3	PopCap	PopCap	November 15, 2011 (NA)	No	Yes	Yes	No
Bejeweled Twist	PopCap	PopCap	January 18, 2010 (NA)	No	Yes	Yes	Yes
Bella Sara	Hidden City Games	Codemasters	September 26, 2008 (PAL)	No	Yes	Yes	No
Ben 10: Alien Force	1st Playable Productions	D3 Publisher	October 28, 2008 (NA)	No	Yes	Yes	Yes
Ben 10 Alien Force: Vilgax Attacks	Papaya Studio	D3 Publisher	October 27, 2009 (NA)	No	Yes	Yes	Yes
Ben 10: Galactic Racing	Tantalus Interactive	D3 Publisher	October 18, 2011 (NA)	No	Yes	Yes	Yes
Ben 10: Omniverse	1st Playable Productions	D3 Publisher	November 13, 2012 (NA)	No	Yes	Yes	Yes
Ben 10: Protector of Earth	1st Playable Productions	D3 Publisher	October 30, 2007 (NA)	No	Yes	Yes	Yes
Ben 10 Ultimate Alien: Cosmic Destruction	Griptonite Games	D3 Publisher	October 5, 2010 (NA)	No	Yes	Yes	Yes
Benjamin Blumchen Vorschulspass: Lernen spielen und verstehen (Note: Primarily a preschool learning application, though it includes a memory-matching game and an unlockable bubble-popping puzzle game.)	Kiddinx	Kiddinx	January 29, 2010 (EU)	No	No	Yes	No
Benjamin the Elephant: A Day at the Zoo	Kiddinx	Kiddinx	March 13, 2009 (EU)	No	No	Yes	No
Bermuda Triangle: Saving the Coral	Storm City Games	Storm City Games	February 2, 2010 (NA)	No	Yes	No	No
Best of Arcade Games DS	DREAM ON STUDIO	Bigben Interactive	December 10, 2008 (EU)	No	No	Yes	No
Best of Board Games DS	DREAM ON STUDIO	Bigben Interactive	August 29, 2007 (EU)	No	No	Yes	No
Best of Card Games DS	DREAM ON STUDIO	Bigben Interactive	December 1, 2006 (EU)	No	No	Yes	No
Best Friends Tonight	Ubisoft	Ubisoft	February 9, 2010 (NA)	No	Yes	No	No
Best of Tests DS	Otaboo	Conspiracy Entertainment	March 4, 2008 (NA)	No	Yes	Yes	No
Betty Boop's Double Shift	Black Lantern Studios	Destination Software, Zoo Digital Publishing	October 19, 2007 (PAL)	No	Yes	Yes	Yes
Beyblade: Metal Fusion	Hudson Soft	Konami	December 3, 2009 (JP)	Yes	Yes	Yes	No
Beyblade: Metal Masters	Hudson Soft	Konami	July 15, 2010 (JP)	Yes	Yes	Yes	Yes
Bibi & Tina: Das grosse Unwetter	Kiddinx	Kiddinx	September 10, 2010 (EU)	No	No	Yes	No
Bibi & Tina - Jump & Ride	Morgen Studios	Kiddinx	October 24, 2010 (EU)	No	No	Yes	No
Bibi & Tina: The Great Hunt; Bibi & Tina: Die grosse Schnitzeljagd	Kiddinx	Kiddinx	March 13, 2009 (EU)	No	No	Yes	No
BiBi Blocksberg: Das gestohlene Hexbuch	Kiddinx	Kiddinx	March 15, 2011 (EU)	No	No	Yes	No
Bibi Blocksberg: Der verhexte Schloss-Schatz	Kiddinx	Kiddinx	July 10, 2012 (EU)	No	No	Yes	No
Bibi Blocksberg: Neustadt im Hex-Chaos	Kiddinx	Kiddinx	November 7, 2008 (EU)	No	No	Yes	No
Bienvenue chez les Ch'tis	Le Caillou	Mindscape	October 29, 2008 (EU)	No	No	Yes	No
Big Bang Mini	Arkedo Studio	SouthPeak Games	January 1, 2009 (NA)	No	Yes	Yes	No
Big Brain Academy	Nintendo	Nintendo	June 30, 2005 (JP)	Yes	Yes	Yes	Yes
The Big Deal	Laughing Jackal	Midas Interactive Entertainment	October 23, 2009 (PAL)	No	No	Yes	Yes
Big League Sports Summer	Koolhaus Games	Activision	June 16, 2009 (NA)	No	Yes	Yes	No
Big Mutha Truckers	Raylight Studios	Destination Software, Zoo Digital Publishing	October 19, 2005 (NA)	No	Yes	Yes	No
Bigfoot: Collision Course	Destination Software	Zoo Games	January 9, 2009 (NA)	No	Yes	Yes	No
The Bigs 2	Blue Castle Games	2K Sports	July 7, 2009 (NA)	No	Yes	Yes	Yes
Biker Mice from Mars	Full Fat	The Game Factory	February 9, 2007 (PAL)	No	Yes	Yes	No
Bikkuriman Daijiten	3 O'Clock	3 O'Clock	August 23, 2007 (JP)	Yes	No	No	No
Billiard Action; Simple DS Series Vol. 2: The Billiard^{JP}	Agenda	505 Games, D3 Publisher	June 30, 2005 (JP)	Yes	No	Yes	No
Bionicle Heroes	Amaze Entertainment	Eidos Interactive, Electronic Arts	November 14, 2006 (NA)	Yes	Yes	Yes	No
Biz Taiken DS Series: Kigyoudou Inshoku	HuneX	Kokuyo	July 26, 2007 (JP)	Yes	No	No	No
Black Cat: Kuroneko no Concerto	Compile Heart	Compile Heart	June 21, 2007 (JP)	Yes	No	No	No
Black Jack: Hi no Tori Hen	Genki	Sega	November 9, 2006 (JP)	Yes	No	No	No
Black Sigil: Blade of the Exiled	Studio Archcraft	Graffiti Entertainment	June 9, 2009 (NA)	No	Yes	No	No
Blades of Thunder II	CokeM Interactive	Summitsoft Entertainment	April 18, 2006 (NA)	No	Yes	No	No
Blazer Drive	Sega	Sega	December 4, 2008 (JP)	Yes	No	No	No
Bleach: Dark Souls	Treasure	Sega	February 15, 2007 (JP)	Yes	Yes	Yes	Yes
Bleach DS 4th: Flame Bringer	Sega	Sega	August 6, 2009 (JP)	Yes	No	No	No
Bleach: The 3rd Phantom	Sega	Sega	June 26, 2008 (JP)	Yes	Yes	No	No
Bleach: The Blade of Fate	Treasure	Sega	January 26, 2006 (JP)	Yes	Yes	Yes	Yes
Blood Bowl	Cyanide	Focus Home Interactive	September 18, 2009 (EU)	No	No	Yes	No
Blood of Bahamut	Think & Feel	Square Enix	August 6, 2009 (JP)	Yes	No	No	No
Blue Dragon Plus	Brownie Brown, feelplus, Mistwalker	AQ Interactive, Ignition Entertainment	September 4, 2008 (JP)	Yes	Yes	Yes	No
Blue Dragon: Awakened Shadow	Mistwalker, Tri-Crescendo	Namco Bandai Games, D3 Publisher	October 8, 2009 (JP)	Yes	Yes	Yes	No
Bob the Builder: Festival of Fun	Blast! Entertainment	Blast! Entertainment	September 26, 2008 (PAL)	No	No	Yes	Yes
Boing! Docomodake DS	AQ Interactive, Suzak Inc.	AQ Interactive, Ignition Entertainment	December 6, 2007 (JP)	Yes	Yes	Yes	No
Bokura no Telebi Game Kentei: Pikotto! Udedameshi	Bandai Namco Games	Bandai Namco Games	June 26, 2008 (JP)	Yes	No	No	No
Bomberman	Hudson Soft	Hudson Soft, Ubisoft	May 19, 2005 (JP)	Yes	Yes	Yes	Yes
Bomberman 2	Hudson Soft	Hudson Soft	December 4, 2008 (JP)	Yes	No	Yes	No
Bomberman Land Touch!	Hudson Soft	Atlus, Hudson Soft, Nintendo, Red Ant Enterprises, Rising Star Games	July 20, 2006 (JP)	Yes	Yes	Yes	Yes
Bomberman Land Touch! 2	Hudson Soft	Hudson Soft, Rising Star Games	July 19, 2007 (JP)	Yes	Yes	Yes	Yes
Bomberman Story DS	Hudson Soft	Hudson Soft, Rising Star Games	March 21, 2007 (JP)	Yes	No	Yes	Yes
Boogie	EA Montreal	Electronic Arts	November 27, 2007 (NA)	No	Yes	Yes	No
Bookworm	PopCap	PopCap	November 30, 2009 (NA)	No	Yes	Yes	No
Bouken-Ou Beet: Vandel vs. Busters	Bandai	Bandai	December 22, 2005 (JP)	Yes	No	No	No
Boule et Bill	Anuman Interactive	Atari SA	June 16, 2008 (EU)	No	No	Yes	No
Boulder Dash: Rocks!	10tacle Studios	10tacle Studios, QV Software	November 23, 2007 (PAL)	No	No	Yes	No
Brain Age: Train Your Brain in Minutes a Day!	Nintendo	Nintendo	May 19, 2005 (JP)	Yes	Yes	Yes	Yes
Brain Age 2: More Training in Minutes a Day!	Nintendo	Nintendo	December 29, 2005 (JP)	Yes	Yes	Yes	Yes
Brain Assist	Sega	Sega	June 21, 2007 (JP)	Yes	Yes	Yes	No
Brain Boost: Beta Wave	Interchannel	505 Games; Interchannel; Majesco	November 23, 2005 (JP)	Yes	Yes	Yes	No
Brain Boost: Gamma Wave	Interchannel	Interchannel; Majesco	November 23, 2005 (JP)	Yes	Yes	No	No
Brain Buster Puzzle Pak	Agetec; Nikoli	505 Games; Agetec; Jaleco Entertainment	September 28, 2006 (JP)	Yes	Yes	Yes	No
Brain Challenge	Gameloft	Gameloft; Ubisoft	January 8, 2008 (NA)	No	Yes	Yes	No
Brain Quest Grades 3 & 4 (Note: Primarily an educational application, though it includes a separate Sudoku mode.)	Electronic Arts	Electronic Arts	September 22, 2008 (NA)	No	Yes	No	No
Brain Quest Grades 5 & 6 (Note: Primarily an educational application, though it includes a separate Sudoku mode.)	Electronic Arts	Electronic Arts	September 22, 2008 (NA)	No	Yes	No	No
Brain Voyage	Razorback Developments	Eidos Interactive	April 11, 2008 (PAL)	No	Yes	Yes	No
Brainstorm Series: Treasure Chase	Storm City Games	Storm City Games	July 14, 2011 (NA)	No	Yes	No	No
Brainstorm Series: Word Up	Storm City Games	Storm City Games	June 29, 2011 (NA)	No	Yes	No	No
Bratz 4 Real	Barking Lizards Technologies	THQ	November 5, 2007 (NA)	No	Yes	Yes	Yes
Bratz Girlz Really Rock	Barking Lizards Technologies	THQ	October 9, 2008 (NA)	No	Yes	Yes	Yes
Bratz Kidz	Neko Entertainment	The Game Factory	October 30, 2008 (AU)	No	Yes	Yes	Yes
Bratz Ponyz	The Game Factory	The Game Factory	July 30, 2007 (NA)	No	Yes	Yes	Yes
Bratz Ponyz 2	Neko Entertainment	The Game Factory	September 9, 2008 (NA)	No	Yes	Yes	Yes
Bratz: Fashion Boutique	Activision	Activision	October 30, 2012 (NA)	No	Yes	No	No
Bratz: Forever Diamondz	Barking Lizards Technologies	THQ	September 18, 2006 (NA)	No	Yes	Yes	Yes
Bratz: Super Babyz	Creat Studios	THQ	February 15, 2008 (EU)	No	Yes	Yes	Yes
Brave Story: My Dreams and Wishes	Namco Bandai Games	Bandai	July 6, 2006 (JP)	Yes	No	No	No
Break 'Em All	Warashi	505 Games, D3 Publisher	October 27, 2005 (JP)	Yes	Yes	Yes	No
Breath: Toiki wa Akaneiro	Beyond Interactive	Success	June 26, 2008 (JP)	Yes	No	No	No
Bridge Training	Atari SA	Atari SA	March 14, 2009 (EU)	No	No	Yes	No
Broken Sword: Shadow of the Templars – The Director's Cut	Revolution Software	Ubisoft	March 24, 2009 (NA)	No	Yes	Yes	No
Brothers in Arms DS	Gameloft	Ubisoft	June 8, 2007 (NA)	No	Yes	Yes	No
Bubble Bobble Double Shot	Dreams	PAL: Rising Star Games; NA: Ignition Entertainment	March 23, 2007 (EU)	No	Yes	Yes	Yes
Bubble Bobble Revolution	Dreams	Codemasters, Rising Star Games, Taito Corporation	November 24, 2005 (JP)	Yes	Yes	Yes	No
Bubble Guppies	Black Lantern Studios	2K Play	November 6, 2012 (NA)	No	Yes	Yes	No
Buffy the Vampire Slayer: Sacrifice	Beast	505 Games	April 22, 2009 (EU)	No	No	Yes	No
Build-a-lot	HipSoft	MumboJumbo	December 9, 2008 (NA)	No	Yes	No	No
Build-A-Bear Workshop	Neko Entertainment	The Game Factory	November 5, 2007 (NA)	No	Yes	Yes	Yes
Build-A-Bear Workshop: Welcome to Hugsville	The Game Factory	The Game Factory	March 23, 2010 (NA)	No	Yes	No	No
Burger Bot	CyberPlanet Interactive	Virtual Play	May 18, 2010 (NA)	No	Yes	No	No
Burger Island	eGames	Destineer	May 8, 2007 (NA)	No	Yes	No	No
Burnout Legends	Visual Impact	Electronic Arts	December 9, 2005 (NA)	No	Yes	Yes	No
Bust-a-Move DS	Happy Happening	505 Games, Majesco, Taito Corporation	December 6, 2005 (NA)	Yes	Yes	Yes	No
Busy Scissors	Little Orbit	Little Orbit	March 4, 2011 (NA)	Yes	Yes	No	No
C.O.P. The Recruit	VD-Dev	Ubisoft	March 25, 2009 (NA)	No	Yes	Yes	Yes
C.O.R.E.	NoWay Studio	Graffiti Entertainment	July 7, 2009 (NA)	No	Yes	Yes	No
C'est Pas Sorcier	Mindscape	Mindscape	February 5, 2009 (EU)	No	No	Yes	No
Cabela's Dangerous Hunts 2011	Activision	Activision	October 19, 2010 (NA)	No	Yes	No	No
Cake Mania	Digital Embryo	Majesco	April 9, 2007 (NA)	No	Yes	Yes	Yes
Cake Mania Main Street	Digital Embryo	Majesco	May 24, 2011 (NA)	No	Yes	Yes	Yes
Cake Mania 2	Digital Embryo	Majesco	June 24, 2008 (NA)	No	Yes	Yes	Yes
Cake Mania 3	Digital Embryo	Majesco	October 9, 2010 (NA)	No	Yes	Yes	Yes
Call of Atlantis	Foreign Media	Foreign Media	November 30, 2010 (EU)	No	No	Yes	No
Call of Duty 4: Modern Warfare	n-Space	Activision	October 13, 2009 (NA)	No	Yes	Yes	Yes
Call of Duty: Black Ops	n-Space	Activision	November 9, 2010 (NA)	No	Yes	Yes	Yes
Call of Duty: Modern Warfare: Mobilized	n-Space	Activision	November 10, 2009 (NA)	No	Yes	Yes	Yes
Call of Duty: Modern Warfare 3: Defiance	n-Space	Activision	November 8, 2011 (NA,PAL)	No	Yes	Yes	Yes
Call of Duty: World at War	n-Space	Activision, Activision Blizzard	November 10, 2008 (NA)	No	Yes	Yes	Yes
Calvin Tucker's Redneck Farm Animals Racing Tournament	Triangle Studios	Zoo Games	August 3, 2010 (NA)	No	Yes	No	No
Camping Mama: Outdoor Adventures	Cooking Mama Limited	Majesco	July 14, 2011 (JP)	Yes	Yes	Yes	No
Candace Kane's Candy Factory	F84 Games	Destineer	December 22, 2008 (NA)	No	Yes	No	No
Captain America: Super Soldier	Griptonite Games	Sega	July 14, 2011 (AU)	No	Yes	Yes	Yes
Captain Morgane and the Golden Turtle	Wizarbox	Reef Entertainment	November 11, 2012 (PAL)	No	No	Yes	Yes
Captain Sabertooth and the Trials by Fire	PAN Vision	PAN Vision	May 11, 2011 (PAL)	No	No	Yes	No
Captain Tsubasa: Gekito no Kiseki	Konami	Konami	March 16, 2010 (JP)	Yes	No	Yes	No
Carcassonne	Koch Media	Koch Media	November 9, 2009 (PAL)	No	No	Yes	No
Card de Asobu! Hajimete no DS	Sega	Sega	March 19, 2009 (JP)	Yes	No	No	No
Card Game 9	Taito Corporation	Taito Corporation	August 31, 2006 (JP)	Yes	No	No	No
Carnival Games	Cat Daddy Games	2K Games, Global Star Software	July 8, 2008 (NA)	No	Yes	Yes	Yes
Cartoon Network Racing	Firebrand Games	The Game Factory	December 4, 2006 (NA)	No	Yes	Yes	Yes
Casper's Scare School Classroom Capers	Nikitova Games	Crave	September 26, 2008 (EU)	No	Yes	Yes	No
Casper's Scare School Spooky Sports Day	The Code Monkeys	Crave, Red Wagon Games	October 20, 2010 (NA)	No	Yes	Yes	No
Castlevania: Dawn of Sorrow	Konami	Konami	August 25, 2005 (JP)	Yes	Yes	Yes	Yes
Castlevania: Order of Ecclesia	Konami	Konami	October 21, 2008 (NA)	Yes	Yes	Yes	Yes
Castlevania: Portrait of Ruin	Konami	Konami	November 16, 2006 (JP)	Yes	Yes	Yes	Yes
Casual Classics	Media Sales & Licensing	Media Sales & Licensing	April 28, 2008 (PAL)	No	No	Yes	No
Casual Mania	Foreign Media	Destineer	April 28, 2008 (NA)	No	Yes	No	No
Catan: Die Erste Insel	USM	cdv Software	May 28, 2009 (PAL)	No	No	Yes	No
Cate West: The Vanishing Files	Magellan Interactive	Destineer	December 15, 2008 (NA)	No	Yes	Yes	No
Cats And Dogs: The Revenge Of Kitty Galore	Engine Software	505 Games	July 20, 2010 (NA)	No	Yes	No	No
Catz	Powerhead	Ubisoft	November 30, 2006 (NA)	Yes	Yes	Yes	No
Cesar Millan's Dog Whisperer	Ubisoft	Ubisoft	October 15, 2008 (NA)	No	Yes	No	No
Cedric - L'Anniversaire de Chen	Little Worlds Studio	Atari Corporation	June 9, 2008 (EU)	No	No	Yes	No
Chainz Galaxy	MumboJumbo	Global Software Publishing	November 18, 2011 (NA)	No	No	Yes	No
Challenge Me: Brain Puzzles	Oxygen Interactive	Oxygen Interactive	May 18, 2009 (NA)	No	Yes	No	No
Challenge Me: Brain Puzzles 2	O-Games	O-Games	November 23, 2010 (NA)	No	Yes	No	No
Challenge Me Kids: Brain Games	Oxygen Interactive	O-Games	September 9, 2011 (EU)	No	Yes	No	No
Challenge Me: Math Workout	Oxygen Interactive	O-Games	May 15, 2009 (NA)	No	Yes	No	No
Challenge Me: Word Puzzles	O-Games	O-Games	September 27, 2011 (NA)	No	Yes	No	No
Chameleon: To Dye For!	Starfish SD	505 Games, Starfish SD, Tommo, UFO Interactive Games	October 12, 2006 (JP)	Yes	Yes	Yes	No
Championship Pony; Mary King's Riding School^{EU}	Coyote Console	Destination Software	March 20, 2008 (NA)	No	Yes	Yes	No
Chao Dream Touch! Happy Anniversary	Marvelous Interactive	Marvelous Interactive	December 7, 2006 (JP)	Yes	No	No	No
Chaotic: Shadow Warriors	Fun Labs	Activision	November 10, 2009 (NA)	No	Yes	No	No
Chara-Chenko	Interchannel	Interchannel	September 1, 2009 (NA)	Yes	No	No	No
Charlotte's Web	Backbone Entertainment	Sega	November 14, 2006 (NA)	No	Yes	Yes	Yes
Charm Girls: My Fashion Mall	Griptonite Games	Electronic Arts	October 20, 2009 (NA)	No	Yes	No	No
Charm Girls: My Fashion Show	Griptonite Games	Electronic Arts	October 20, 2009 (NA)	No	Yes	No	No
Charm Girls: My Perfect Prom	Griptonite Games	Electronic Arts	October 20, 2009 (NA)	No	Yes	No	No
The Chase: Felix Meets Felicity	Razorback Developments	Atari SA	January 27, 2009 (NA)	No	Yes	Yes	Yes
Cheer We Go! Kirakira Rhythm Collection^{JP}	Santa Entertainment	Natsume	March 23, 2010 (NA)	Yes	Yes	No	No
The Cheetah Girls: Passport to Stardom	Handheld Games	Disney Interactive Studios	August 13, 2008 (NA)	No	Yes	Yes	No
The Cheetah Girls: Pop Star Sensations	Disney Interactive Studios	Buena Vista Games	October 9, 2007 (NA)	No	Yes	No	No
Chess; Schach^{DE} Schaakmat!^{NL} Echecs^{FR}	DTP Entertainment	DTP Entertainment	March 16, 2007 (PAL)	No	No	Yes	No
Chessmaster: The Art of Learning	Ubisoft	Ubisoft	October 23, 2007 (NA)	No	Yes	Yes	No
Chevrolet Camaro Wild Ride	Visual Impact	CokeM Interactive	November 15, 2010 (NA)	No	Yes	No	No
Chi's Sweet Home: Chi ga Ouchi ni Yatte Kita!	Siesta	Interchannel	September 4, 2008 (JP)	Yes	No	No	No
Chibi Maruko-chan DS Maru-chan no Machi	Banpresto	Namco Bandai Games	February 5, 2009 (JP)	Yes	No	No	No
Chibi-Robo!: Park Patrol	Skip Ltd.	Nintendo	July 5, 2007 (JP)	Yes	Yes	Yes	Yes
Chicken Attack DS	Snap Dragon Games	Intenium	October 17, 2007 (PAL)	No	No	Yes	No
Chicken Blaster	Zoo Games	Zoo Games	September 15, 2009 (NA)	No	Yes	No	No
Chicken Hunter	Phenomedia	MumboJumbo	March 4, 2008 (NA)	No	Yes	No	No
Chicken Shoot	FrontLine Studios	Destination Software, Zoo Digital Publishing	July 10, 2007 (NA)	No	Yes	Yes	Yes
Children of Mana	Next Entertainment	Nintendo, Square Enix	March 2, 2006 (JP)	Yes	Yes	Yes	No
Chishiki-Ou Series: Train Master	Global A	Global A	January 10, 2008 (JP)	Yes	No	No	No
Choco Ken no Dekitate Sweets Wagon	Creative Core	Creative Core	March 19, 2009 (JP)	Yes	No	No	No
Choco Ken no Omise: Patisserie & Sweets Shop Game	Creative Core	Creative Core	February 9, 2006 (JP)	Yes	No	No	No
Chocobo to Mahou no Ehon: Majo to Shoujo to Go-nin no Yuusha	h.a.n.d. Inc.	Square Enix	December 11, 2008 (JP)	Yes	No	No	No
Chocolatier	Zoo Games	Zoo Games	March 3, 2010 (NA)	No	Yes	No	No
Chōsōjū Mecha MG	Sandlot	Nintendo	September 2, 2006 (JP)	Yes	No	No	No
Chokkan! Asonde Relaxuma	Rocket Company	Rocket Company	September 25, 2008 (JP)	Yes	No	No	No
Chotto-Aima no Colpile DS	Beyond Interactive	Success	April 3, 2008 (JP)	Yes	No	No	No
Chou Gekijouban Keroro Gunsou 3: Tenkuu Daibouken de Arimasu!	Bandai Namco Games	Bandai Namco Games	February 28, 2008 (JP)	Yes	No	No	No
Chou Gekijouban Keroro Gunsou: Enshuu Dayo! Zenin Shuugou	Aspect	Bandai	March 16, 2006 (JP)	Yes	No	No	No
Chou Gekijouban Keroro Gunsou: Gekishin Dragon Warriors de Arimasu!	Inti Creates	Bandai	February 19, 2009 (JP)	Yes	No	No	No
Chou Kowai Hanashi DS: Ao no Shou	Alchemist	Alchemist	August 5, 2010 (JP)	Yes	No	No	No
Chou Meisaku Suiri Adventure DS: Raymond Chandler Gensaku - Saraba Ai Shiki Onna Yo	FuRyu	FuRyu	May 28, 2009 (JP)	Yes	No	No	No
Chou!! Nep League DS	Jaleco Entertainment	Jaleco Entertainment	March 16, 2006 (JP)	Yes	No	No	No
The Chou-Dangan!! Custom Sensha	ThinkArts	D3Publisher	January 31, 2008 (JP)	Yes	No	No	No
Christiane Stengers Gedachtnis-Coach (Note: Primarily a memory-training application, with timed tests of card sequences, objects and numbers.)	Crimson Cow	Crimson Cow	June 26, 2012 (PAL)	No	No	Yes	No
Chronicles of Mystery: Curse of the Ancient Temple	City Interactive	City Interactive	November 2, 2009 (NA)	No	Yes	No	No
Chronicles of Mystery: The Secret Tree of Life	City Interactive	City Interactive	March 1, 2011 (NA)	No	Yes	No	No
The Chronicles of Narnia: Prince Caspian	Traveller's Tales	Disney Interactive Studios	May 15, 2008 (NA)	No	Yes	Yes	Yes
The Chronicles of Narnia: The Lion, the Witch and the Wardrobe	Amaze Entertainment	NA EU: Buena Vista Games; JP: D3 Publisher	November 14, 2005 (NA)	Yes	Yes	Yes	No
Chrono Trigger	Tose	Square Enix	November 20, 2008 (JP)	Yes	Yes	Yes	Yes
Chronos Twin	EnjoyUp	Oxygen Games	October 2, 2007 (EU)	No	Yes	Yes	No
Chrysler Classic Racing	EM Studios	Zoo Games	November 25, 2008 (NA)	No	Yes	No	No
Chuck E. Cheese's Gameroom	UFO Interactive	UFO Interactive	November 8, 2010 (NA)	No	Yes	No	No
Chuck E. Cheese's Party Games	UFO Interactive	UFO Interactive	July 13, 2010 (NA)	No	Yes	No	No
Chuck E. Cheese's Playhouse	UFO Interactive	UFO Interactive	November 8, 2010 (NA)	No	Yes	No	No
Chungjeon! Hanguginui Sangsingnyeok DS	Studio9	Studio9	October 26, 2007 (KR)	Yes	No	No	No
Chuugaku Eitango Target 1800 DS	IE Institute	IE Institute	August 10, 2006 (JP)	Yes	No	No	No
Chuugaku Junbi: 5-Kyouka Kanpeki DS 2015 Nendoban	Benesse	Benesse	2011 (JP)	Yes	No	No	No
Chuukana Janshi Tenhoo Painyan Remix	Jaleco Entertainment	Jaleco Entertainment	June 28, 2007 (JP)	Yes	No	No	No
Cid to Chocobo no Fushigina Dungeon Toki Wasure no Meikyū DS+	Square Enix	Square Enix	October 30, 2008 (JP)	Yes	No	No	No
Cinnamoroll: Ohanashi shiyo! - Kira Kira DE Kore Cafe	Bandai Namco Games	Bandai Namco Games	December 7, 2006 (JP)	Yes	No	No	No
City Life	Ubisoft	Ubisoft	August 7, 2009 (EU)	Yes	No	Yes	No
Cinnamon Ball DS	Rocket Company	Rocket Company	July 12, 2007 (JP)	Yes	No	No	No
Classic Word Games	Ubisoft	Ubisoft	July 23, 2009 (NA)	No	Yes	No	No
Claymore: Gigan no Majo	Digital Works Entertainment	Digital Works Entertainment	May 28, 2009 (JP)	Yes	No	No	No
Clever Kids: Creepy Crawlies	Gamerholix	Midas Interactive Entertainment	October 23, 2009 (EU)	No	No	Yes	No
Clever Kids: Dino Land (Note: Primarily an educational application, though it includes sliding puzzles, jigsaw puzzles, spot-the-difference activities and a dinosaur memory game.)	Gamerholix	Midas Interactive Entertainment	November 2, 2007 (EU)	No	No	Yes	No
Clever Kids: Farmyard Fun	Gamerholix	Midas Interactive Entertainment	October 17, 2008 (EU)	No	No	Yes	No
Clever Kids: Pirates	Gamerholix	Midas Interactive Entertainment	October 17, 2008 (EU)	No	No	Yes	No
Clever Kids: Pony World	Gamerholix	Midas Interactive Entertainment	November 2, 2007 (EU)	No	No	Yes	No
The Clique: Diss and Make-Up	Gorilla Systems Corp.	Warner Bros. Interactive Entertainment	August 25, 2009 (NA)	No	Yes	Yes	No
Cloudy with a Chance of Meatballs	Ubisoft	Ubisoft	September 11, 2009 (EU)	No	Yes	Yes	Yes
Cloudy with a Chance of Meatballs 2	1st Playable Productions	GameMill Entertainment	September 24, 2013 (EU)	No	Yes	Yes	Yes
Club Penguin: Elite Penguin Force	1st Playable Productions	Disney Interactive Studios	November 25, 2008 (NA)	No	Yes	Yes	Yes
Clubhouse Games; 42 All-Time Classics^{EU} Wi-Fi Taiou: Sekai no Daredemo Asobi Taizen^{JP}	Agenda	Nintendo	September 29, 2006 (EU)	Yes	Yes	Yes	Yes
Clue / Mouse Trap / Perfection / Aggravation	Gravity-i	Destination Software	November 20, 2007 (NA)	No	Yes	No	No
Coach Cerebral	Uacari	Avanquest Software	July 13, 2009 (EU)	No	Yes	Yes	No
Cocoro no Cocoron	h.a.n.d. Inc.	Bandai Namco Games	July 14, 2011 (JP)	Yes	No	No	No
Cocoto Kart Racer	Neko Entertainment	Bigben Interactive, Conspiracy Entertainment, Kemco, Midway Games	January 1, 2005 (EU)	Yes	Yes	Yes	No
Code Geass: Hangyaku no Lelouch	Crafts & Meister	Bandai Namco Games	October 25, 2007 (JP)	Yes	No	Yes	No
Code Geass: Hangyaku no Lelouch R2 - Banjou no Geass Gekijou	Crafts & Meister	Bandai Namco Games	August 7, 2008 (JP)	Yes	No	No	No
Code Lyoko	DC Studios	The Game Factory	May 15, 2007 (NA)	No	Yes	Yes	No
Code Lyoko: Fall of X.A.N.A.	Neko Entertainment	The Game Factory	June 6, 2008 (EU)	No	Yes	Yes	No
Color Cross	Rising Star Games	Zoo Games	November 28, 2008 (EU)	No	Yes	Yes	Yes
Command and Destroy	Cypron Studios	Destination Software, Zoo Digital Publishing	February 15, 2008 (NA)	No	Yes	Yes	No
Commando: Steel Disaster	Mana Computer Software	Lexicon Entertainment, XS Games	May 30, 2008 (EU)	No	Yes	Yes	No
Contact	Grasshopper Manufacture	Atlus, Marvelous Interactive, Rising Star Games	March 30, 2006 (JP)	Yes	Yes	Yes	No
Contra 4	WayForward Technologies	Konami	November 13, 2007 (NA)	Yes	Yes	No	No
The Conveni DS: Otona no Keiei Ryoku Training	Hamster	Nippon Ichi Software	November 27, 2008 (JP)	Yes	No	No	No
Cookie & Cream	From Software	505 Games, Agetec, From Software	June 28, 2007 (JP)	Yes	Yes	Yes	No
Cookie Shop	TDK Core	SouthPeak Games	February 27, 2009 (NA)	No	Yes	No	No
Cookin' Idol I! My! Main! Game de Hirameki! Kirameki Cooking	Konami	Konami	February 25, 2010 (JP)	Yes	No	No	No
Cooking Mama	Cooking Mama Limited	505 Games, Majesco, Taito Corporation	March 23, 2006 (JP)	Yes	Yes	Yes	Yes
Cooking Mama 2: Dinner with Friends	Cooking Mama Limited	505 Games, Majesco, Taito Corporation	November 13, 2007 (NA)	Yes	Yes	Yes	Yes
Cooking Mama 3: Shop & Chop	Taito Corporation	505 Games, Taito Corporation	October 20, 2009 (NA)	Yes	Yes	Yes	Yes
Cool 104 Joker & Setline	Aruze Corp	Aruze Corp	December 2, 2004 (NA)	Yes	No	No	No
Coraline	Art	D3 Publisher	January 27, 2009 (NA)	No	Yes	Yes	No
Cornelsen Trainer: Englisch Klasse 5 und 6 (Note: Primarily an English-learning application, though it includes mini-games unlocked through progress in the lessons.)	HMH Hamburger Medien Haus	HMH Hamburger Medien Haus	2009 (EU)	No	No	Yes	No
Cornelsen Trainer: Englisch Klasse 7 und 8 (Note: Primarily an English-learning application, though it includes mini-games unlocked through progress in the lessons.)	HMH Hamburger Medien Haus	HMH Hamburger Medien Haus	2009 (EU)	No	No	Yes	No
Coropata	LukPlus	LukPlus	December 29, 2009 (JP)	Yes	No	No	No
Corvette Evolution GT	Milestone	Black Bean Games	January 15, 2008 (NA)	No	Yes	Yes	No
Cory in the House	Handheld Games	Disney Interactive Studios	April 15, 2008 (NA)	No	Yes	No	No
Cosmetic Paradise	Global A	Global A	July 19, 2007 (JP)	Yes	No	Yes	No
Cosmetic Paradise: Kirei no Mahou	Global A	Global A	April 29, 2010 (JP)	Yes	No	No	No
Cosmetic Paradise: Princess Life	Global A	Global A	April 14, 2011 (JP)	Yes	No	No	No
Cosmopolitan	Anuman Interactive	Atari SA	November 19, 2008 (EU)	No	No	Yes	No
Cosmos Chaos!	Mentor Interactive	Crave	October 22, 2010 (NA)	No	Yes	No	No
Countdown: The Game	Mindscape	Mindscape	November 6, 2009 (EU)	No	No	Yes	No
Cradle of Rome	Cerasus Media	D3 Publisher, Rising Star Games	November 18, 2008 (NA)	No	Yes	Yes	Yes
Crafting Mama	Cooking Mama Limited	Square Enix, Majesco, 505 Games	October 26, 2010 (NA)	Yes	Yes	Yes	Yes
Crash Boom Bang!	Dimps Corporation	Vivendi Games	July 27, 2006 (JP)	Yes	Yes	Yes	No
Crash of the Titans	Amaze Entertainment	Vivendi Games	October 19, 2007 (EU)	No	Yes	Yes	Yes
Crash: Mind over Mutant	Tose	Activision Blizzard	October 29, 2008 (NA)	No	Yes	Yes	No
Crayola Treasure Adventures	Crave Entertainment	Crave Entertainment, Ignition Entertainment	January 26, 2010 (NA)	No	Yes	Yes	No
Crayon Shin-Chan DS: Arashi o Yobu Nutte Crayoon Daisakusen! !Shin Chan: Flipa en colores!^{ES}	Inti Creates	505 Games	March 21, 2007 (JP)	Yes	No	Yes	No
Crayon Shin-Chan Shokkugan! Densetsu o Yobu Omake Daiketsusen!!	Bandai Namco Games	Bandai Namco Games	December 2, 2010 (JP)	Yes	No	No	No
Crayon Shin-Chan: Arashi o Yobu - Nendororo~n Daihenshin	Inti Creates	505 Games	December 3, 2009 (JP)	Yes	No	No	No
Crayon Shin-Chan: Arashi o Yobu Cinema Land	Inti Creates	505 Games	November 28, 2008 (JP)	Yes	No	No	No
Crayon Shin-Chan: Obaka Daininden - Susume! Kasukabe Ninja Tai!	Inti Creates	505 Games	March 18, 2010 (JP)	Yes	No	No	No
Crazy Chicken Adventure: The Pharaoh's Treasure	MumboJumbo	MumboJumbo	June 11, 2009 (NA)	No	Yes	Yes	No
Crazy Chicken: Jump'N Run Atlantis Quest	MumboJumbo; Snapdragon Games	MumboJumbo	June 11, 2009 (NA)	No	Yes	Yes	No
Crazy Chicken: Star Karts	MumboJumbo	MumboJumbo	June 11, 2009 (NA)	No	Yes	Yes	No
Crazy Circus	DTP Entertainment	DTP Entertainment	2012 (PAL)	No	No	Yes	No
Crazy Frog Collectables Art School (Note: Primarily a colouring application, though it includes four mini-games involving memory, speed and precision, including a sliding puzzle.)	Ertain	Mercury Games	February 5, 2008 (EU)	No	No	Yes	No
Crazy Frog Racer	Digital Jesters	Atari, Mercury Games	November 3, 2006 (EU)	No	No	Yes	No
Crazy Machines 2	DTP Entertainment	DTP Entertainment	October 10, 2008 (EU)	No	Yes	Yes	No
Crazy Pig	Mindscape	Mindscape	November 30, 2007 (EU)	No	No	Yes	No
Crazy School Games; Eindeloos Games Top 10^{NL}	DTP Entertainment	DTP Entertainment	2012 (PAL)	No	No	Yes	No
Crime Lab: Body of Evidence	City Interactive	City Interactive	June 22, 2010 (NA)	No	Yes	No	No
Crime Scene	White Birds Productions	SouthPeak Games	February 16, 2010 (NA)	No	Yes	No	No
Crimson Room	Takagism	Success	December 20, 2007 (JP)	Yes	No	No	No
Croket! DS: Tenkuu no Yuushatachi	Jupiter Corporation	Konami	December 15, 2005 (JP)	Yes	No	No	No
Cross Treasures	syn Sophia	Square Enix	December 3, 2009 (JP)	Yes	No	No	No
The Crossword & Kanji Puzzle	DigitalWare	D3Publisher	March 13, 2008 (JP)	Yes	No	No	No
Crossword de Manabou! Chiri - Rekishi	AI	Hudson Soft	May 24, 2007 (JP)	Yes	No	No	No
Crossword DS + Sekai 1-Shuu Cross	AI	Hudson Soft	October 25, 2007 (JP)	Yes	No	No	No
CrossworDS (Deep Silver)	Deep Silver	Deep Silver	May 30, 2008 (NA)	No	No	Yes	No
CrossworDS (Nintendo); Nintendo Presents: Crossword Collection^{EU}	Nuevo Retro Games	Nintendo	May 5, 2008 (NA)	No	Yes	Yes	Yes
Crosswords Cruciverba Italiani	Independent Arts	Deep Silver	December 3, 2009 (EU)	No	No	Yes	No
Cruise Line Tycoon	Foreign Media	Foreign Media	November 12, 2010 (NA)	No	No	Yes	No
Crystal Mines	Torus Games	Home Entertainment Suppliers	June 25, 2010 (AUS)	No	No	No	Yes
CSI: Crime Scene Investigation: Unsolved!	Other Ocean	Ubisoft	November 23, 2010 (NA)	No	Yes	Yes	No
CSI: Dark Motives	Powerhead Games	Ubisoft	November 2, 2007 (EU)	No	Yes	Yes	Yes
CSI: Deadly Intent - The Hidden Cases	Telltale Games	Ubisoft	October 27, 2009 (NA)	No	Yes	Yes	No
Culdcept DS	Sega	Sega	October 16, 2008 (JP)	Yes	No	No	No
Curling DS	Rocket Company	Rocket Company, Ubisoft	November 22, 2006 (JP)	Yes	Yes	No	No
Custom Beat Battle: Draglade 2	Bandai Namco Games	Bandai Namco Games	July 10, 2008 (JP)	Yes	No	No	No
Custom Mahjong	Success	Success	December 20, 2007 (JP)	Yes	No	No	No
Custom Robo Arena	Noise	Nintendo	October 19, 2006 (JP)	Yes	Yes	Yes	No

== Applications ==
There are 480 applications included in the list.

Title	Developer(s)	Publisher(s)	First released	JP	NA	EU	AU
100 Classic Books	Genius Sonority	Nintendo	October 18, 2007 (JP)	Yes	Yes	Yes	Yes
1000 Cooking Recipes from Elle a Table	Agenda	Nintendo	July 2, 2010 (EU)	No	No	Yes	No
200 Klassische Bucher	Cerasus Media	rondomedia	September 4, 2009 (EU)	No	No	Yes	No
200-Mannin no KanKen: Tokoton Kanji Nou	IE Institute	IE Institute	November 9, 2006 (JP)	Yes	No	No	No
250-Mannin no Kanken Premium - Zenkyuu Zen-Kanji Kanzen Seiha	IE Institute	IE Institute	April 23, 2006 (JP)	Yes	No	No	No
4 Kyouka Perfect Clear DS: Eigo Onsei Tsuki	Benesse	Benesse	2012 (JP)	Yes	No	No	No
5-Kyuu kara 1-Kyuu Kanzen Taiou: Saishin Kako Mondai - 2-Ji Shiken Taisaku - Eiken Kanzenban	IE Institute	IE Institute	May 9, 2011 (JP)	Yes	No	No	No
5-Nen Kanji Keisan Nigate Hunter DS	Good-Feel	Benesse	April 30, 2012 (JP)	Yes	No	No	No
700-Banjin no Atama o Yokusuru: Chou Keisan DS - 13000-Mon + Image Keisan	IE Institute	IE Institute	March 12, 2009 (JP)	Yes	No	No	No
99 no Namida	Open Sesame	Bandai Namco Games	June 5, 2008 (EU)	Yes	No	No	No
Active Health with Carol Vorderman	Fuse Games	Fuse Games	August 7, 2009 (PAL)	No	No	Yes	No
Adi: L'Entraineur - 6e-5e	Mindscape	Mindscape	2008 (EU)	No	No	Yes	No
Adi: L'Entraineur - CE1-CE2	Mindscape	Mindscape	2008 (EU)	No	No	Yes	No
Adi: L'Entraineur - CM1-CM2	Mindscape	Mindscape	2008 (EU)	No	No	Yes	No
Adi L'entraineur, Objectif Anglais DS	Mindscape	Mindscape	2008 (EU)	No	No	Yes	No
America's Test Kitchen Let's Get Cooking	indieszero	Nintendo	March 28, 2010 (NA)	No	Yes	No	No
ANA Original Gotouchi Kentei DS	Studio Zan	Spike	2007 (JP)	Yes	No	No	No
Anan Kanshuu: Onna Dikara Kinkyuu Up! DS	Suzak	Bandai Namco Games	July 26, 2007 (EU)	Yes	No	No	No
Anata Dake no Private Lesson - DS de Hajimeru - Tipness no Yoga	Elements	Square Enix	October 4, 2007 (JP)	Yes	No	No	No
Anone DS	Vamos	Three Ten	August 27, 2009 (JP)	Yes	No	No	No
Arasuji de Kitaeru Sokumimi no Susume DS	IE Institute	IE Institute	April 26, 2007 (JP)	Yes	No	No	No
Arasuji de Oboeru Sokudoku no Susume DS	IE Institute	IE Institute	April 26, 2007 (JP)	Yes	No	No	No
Art Academy	Headstrong Games	Nintendo	June 19, 2010 (JP)	Yes	Yes	Yes	Yes
Atama ga Yoku Naru: The Me no Training	Japan Art Media (JAM)	D3Publisher	December 21, 2006 (JP)	Yes	No	No	No
Bae Yong-joon to Manabu Kankokugo DS	D3	D3 Publisher	September 19, 2009 (JP)	Yes	No	No	No
Bae Yong-joon to Manabu Kankokugo DS Date Hen	D3	D3 Publisher	August 26, 2010 (JP)	Yes	No	No	No
Bae Yong-joon to Manabu Kankokugo DS Test Hen	D3	D3 Publisher	August 26, 2010 (JP)	Yes	No	No	No
Baken DS	Microvision	Dimple Entertainment	September 20, 2007 (JP)	Yes	No	No	No
Bartender DS	Electronic Arts	Electronic Arts	September 27, 2007 (JP)	Yes	No	No	No
Berlitz: My English Coach	Sanuk Games	Avanquest Software	April 8, 2009 (EU)	No	No	Yes	No
Bibi Blocksberg: Mathe Klassen 1 bis 4	Kiddinx	Kiddinx	2011 (EU)	No	No	Yes	No
Chuugaku Junbi: 5 Kyouka Kanpeki DS	Benesse	Benesse	2011 (JP)	Yes	No	No	No
Cornelsen Trainer: Mathe Klasse 5	HMH Hamburger Medien Haus	HMH Hamburger Medien Haus	2009 (EU)	No	No	Yes	No
Cornelsen Trainer: Mathe Klasse 6	HMH Hamburger Medien Haus	HMH Hamburger Medien Haus	2009 (EU)	No	No	Yes	No
The Biggest Loser	Webfoot Technologies	THQ	October 6, 2009 (PAL)	No	Yes	Yes	Yes
Biz Nouryoku DS Series: Wagokoro no Moto	Kokuyo	Kokuyo	September 13, 2007 (JP)	Yes	No	No	No
Biz Nouryoku Series: Miryoku Kaikaku	Kokuyo	Kokuyo	July 12, 2007 (JP)	Yes	No	No	No
Boshi Techou DS with Aka-chan Massage	Mechanic Arms	Mechanic Arms	December 15, 2010 (JP)	Yes	No	No	No
Brico Utile	Neko Entertainment	Neko Entertainment	2009 (EU)	No	No	Yes	No
Brigitte: Ernaehrungs Coach	HMH Interactive	HMH Interactive	2010 (EU)	No	No	Yes	No
Business Ryoku Kentei DS	Electronic Arts	Electronic Arts	March 27, 2008 (JP)	Yes	No	No	No
Byoutai Seiri DS: Image Dekiru! Shikkan, Shoujou to Care	Medika Shuppan	Medika Shuppan	December 1, 2011 (JP)	Yes	No	No	No
Cahier de Vacances pour Adultes	BIP Games	Mindscape	May 19, 2008 (EU)	No	No	Yes	No
Cahier de Vacances pour Adultes 2	BIP Games	Mindscape	March 30, 2009 (EU)	No	No	Yes	No
Center Shiken: Eigo Listening Sokushuu DS	Good-Feel	Educational Network	November 19, 2009 (NA)	Yes	No	No	No
Chikyuu no Arukikata DS - France-Hen	Will	Square Enix	July 5, 2007 (JP)	Yes	No	No	No
Chikyuu no Arukikata DS - Hawaii-Hen	Will	Square Enix	October 4, 2007 (JP)	Yes	No	No	No
Chikyuu no Arukikata DS - Hong Kong-Hen	Will	Square Enix	December 13, 2007 (JP)	Yes	No	No	No
Chikyuu no Arukikata DS - Igirisu-Hen	Will	Square Enix	December 13, 2007 (JP)	Yes	No	No	No
Chikyuu no Arukikata DS - Italia-Hen	Will	Square Enix	July 5, 2007 (JP)	Yes	No	No	No
Chikyuu no Arukikata DS - New York-Hen	Will	Square Enix	October 4, 2007 (JP)	Yes	No	No	No
Chikyuu no Arukikata DS - Seoul - Busan-Hen	Will	Square Enix	December 13, 2007 (JP)	Yes	No	No	No
Chikyuu no Arukikata DS - Shanghai-Hen	Will	Square Enix	December 13, 2007 (JP)	Yes	No	No	No
Chikyuu no Arukikata DS - Taiwan-Hen	Will	Square Enix	October 4, 2007 (JP)	Yes	No	No	No
Chikyuu no Arukikata DS - Thai-Hen	Will	Square Enix	July 5, 2007 (JP)	Yes	No	No	No
Chou Kantan Boki Nyuumon DS	IE Institute	IE Institute	November 22, 2007 (JP)	Yes	No	No	No
Chubaw Desuyo! Kyoushou Recipe Shuu	Alpha Unit	Alpha Unit	October 4, 2007 (JP)	Yes	No	No	No
Code de la Route DS	Bigben Interactive	Neko Entertainment	June 11, 2007 (EU)	No	No	Yes	No
Code de la Route: Edition Deluxe	Micro Application	Micro Application	May 28, 2009 (EU)	No	No	Yes	No
Code de la Route (Micro Application); Code de la Route: Edition 2008	DREAM ON STUDIO	Micro Application	2006 (EU)	No	No	Yes	No

== Bundles ==
There are 50 games included in the list.

Title	Developer(s)	Publisher(s)	First released	JP	NA	EU	AU
2 Disney Games: Phineas and Ferb + Phineas and Ferb Ride Again	Altron	Disney Interactive Studios	2013 (EU)	No	No	Yes	No
Animal Planet: Vet Collection	Activision	Activision	July 13, 2010 (EU)	No	No	Yes	No
Ben 10 Triple Pack	1st Playable Productions	D3Publisher	July 7, 2011 (NA)	No	Yes	Yes	Yes
Best of Bibi & Tina: Die grosse Schnitzeljagd + Das grosse Unwetter	Kiddinx	Kiddinx	November 14, 2014 (EU)	No	No	Yes	No
Best of BiBi Blocksberg: Neustadt im Hex-Chaos + Das gestohlene Hexbuch	Kiddinx	Kiddinx	March 8, 2013 (EU)	No	No	Yes	No
Chocobo to Mahou no Ehon: Special Package	1st Playable Productions	D3Publisher	December 11, 2008 (JP)	Yes	No	No	No
Cornelsen Trainer: Mathe Klasse 5 und 6	Tivola	Tivola	2008 (EU)	No	No	Yes	No
Cradle Double Pack	Rising Star Games	Rising Star Games	April 28, 2011 (EU)	No	No	Yes	No

== See also ==
- List of DSiWare games and applications
- List of Game Boy games
- List of Game Boy Advance games
- List of Game Boy Color games
- List of Nintendo DS Wi-Fi Connection games
- List of Wii games
- Lists of video games
