= Movaya =

American technology company

- Company type: Mobile Content Distribution & Services
- Industry: Wireless
- Founded: 2004
- Headquarters: Seattle, Washington
- Number of employees: 19

Movaya was a Seattle-based technology company that developed mobile game distribution and management solutions. It was formed in 2004 by John Calian, Phil Yerkes and Stanley Wang. Movaya also operated a wholly owned subsidiary in Chengdu, China.

Movaya's client and distribution relationships included: Capcom, Walmart, Gamehouse, RealArcade, RealNetworks, Reaxion, Superscape, COM2US, GOSUB 60, Kingston Technology and Mobliss.

== History ==
Movaya launched PlugNPlay - a mobile game ecommerce network - in March 2007

Movaya launched TryNBuy - a mobile game free trial download service - in February 2008

Movaya was purchased by Digby Mobile Commerce in late 2009. Digby was itself acquired by Phunware in May 2014.

== Mobile Game Title Examples in Movaya Network ==
- 1942 (video game)
- Bejeweled
- Cake Mania
- Mega Man (video game)
- Solitaire
- Street Fighter (video game)
- Tetris
- Tom Clancy's Splinter Cell
- Tony Hawk's Underground
- Yetisports
