= List of Nintendo DS games =

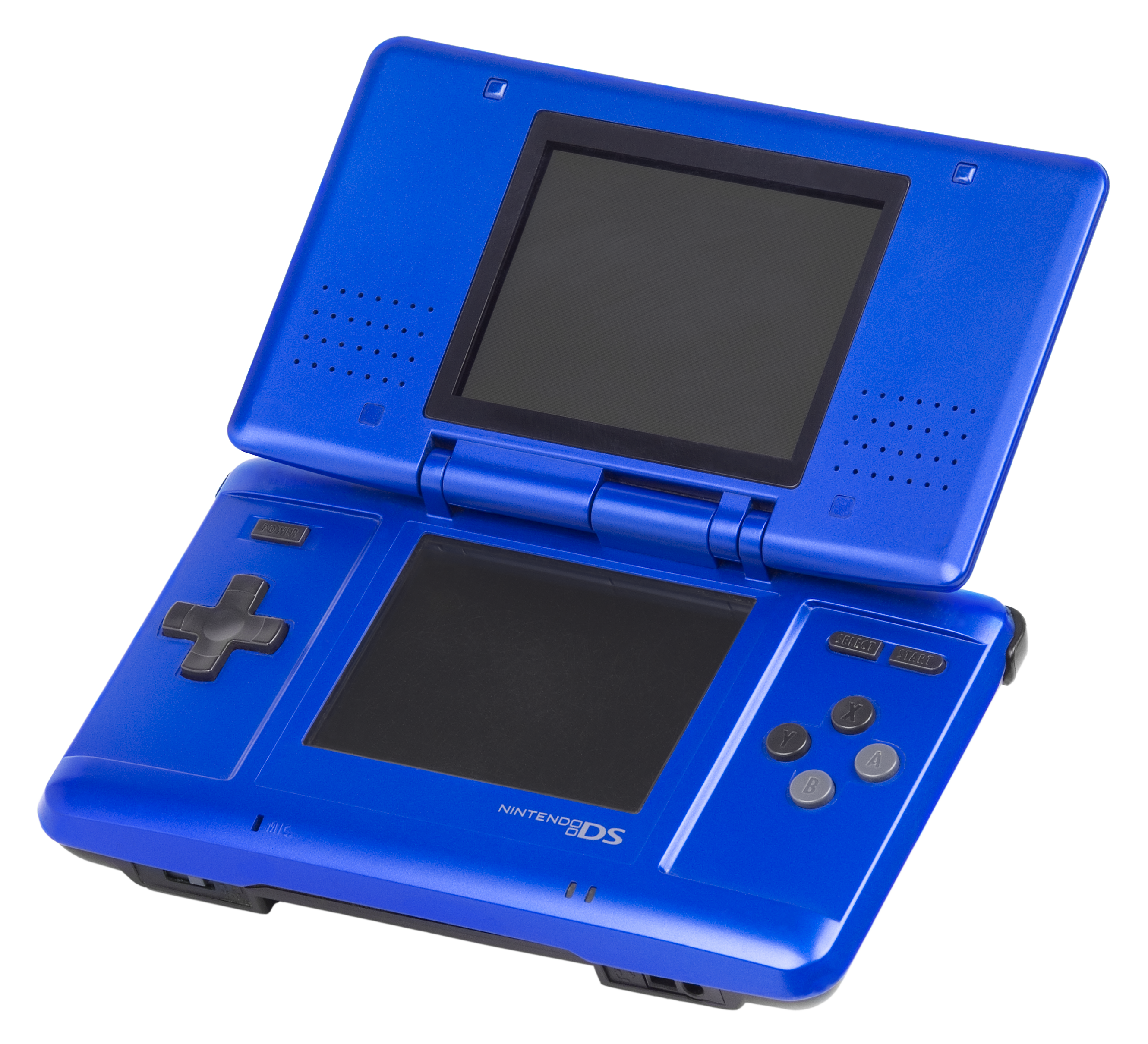
An electric blue Nintendo DS console

The Nintendo DS is a handheld video game console developed by Nintendo. Games are released in physical formats and are sold on Nintendo DS Game Cards that slot into the DS console unit.

DS games are listed across four pages due to technical limitations. There are currently 3467 games in this table across all pages: 0 to C, D to I, J to P and Q to Z.

- List of Nintendo DS games (0–C)
- List of Nintendo DS games (D–I)
- List of Nintendo DS games (J–P)
- List of Nintendo DS games (Q–Z)

Not included in the main list are:

- DSiWare games
- iQue DS games

Other related lists include:

- List of best-selling Nintendo DS video games
- List of cancelled Nintendo DS games
