= Phunware =

Mobile software company

Phunware Inc.
- Type: Public
- Traded as: Nasdaq: PHUN
- Industry: Mobile software Generative AI; Digital advertising
- Founded: 2009; 17 years ago
- Headquarters: Austin, Texas; Irvine, California; San Diego, California; Miami, Florida
- Key people: Jeremy Krol (CEO); Chris Olive EVP General Counsel
- Products: PhunWare; PhunToken
- Revenue: 19,150,000 United States dollar (2019)
- Number of employees: 50+
- Website: phunware.com phuntoken.com

Phunware Inc. is a publicly traded enterprise software company headquartered in Austin, Texas. Founded in 2009, Phunware builds cloud-based platforms which are intended to build user engagement for marketing and public-relations purposes. Its services include mobile app development, location-based services, digital advertising, and generative AI tools.

Phunware is listed on the Nasdaq under the ticker symbol PHUN. The company's CEO is Jeremy Krol, who joined in 2025 and has focused on re-aligning the business around high-growth SaaS and AI.

Phunware has raised over $100 million since inception and completed its public listing in 2018 via a merger with Stellar Acquisition III, a special-purpose acquisition company (SPAC).

Phunware is also involved in voter engagement, including tracking potential voters' locations, and offers a fundraising platform used by political campaigns and advocacy groups, for which the company has faced public scrutiny. In 2020, Phunware was the fifth largest advertising technology company in politics. In November of that year, it had more than 940 million monthly unique active devices and had 5 billion daily transactions, and had raised more than $120 million in capital since its founding.

== History ==
In 2014, as part of a $30 million expansion, Phunware acquired Digby Mobile Commerce, also based in Austin. The acquisition included Dibgy's subsidiary Movaya, based in Seattle and Chengdu.

In 2017, the company acquired Odyssey, Simplikate, Digby, Tapit! ($23 million acquisition in 2017) and GoTV.

Their customers in 2019 included Fox Networks Group, HID Global, and MD Anderson. Previous customers included Warner Brothers, NASCAR, NFL, and NBC Sports. Applications that send data to Phunware servers include the campus map for Cedars-Sinai Medical Center and GunDealio, an app for gun sales from Gun Talk Media. Phunware's location tracking was used, for instance, to target 2018 Democratic ads at participants in the anti-Trump 2017 Women's March in DC.

During the 2020 US Presidential election, Phunware provided campaign data, including "users' daily digital trail", to the Trump reelection campaign, through a $3 million contract awarded by Brad Parscale's American Made Media Consultants. They also built the Trump–Pence reelection app for the campaign in November 2019.

Phunware performed a reverse merger with Stellar Acquisitions III, a special-purpose acquisition company (or shell company) in December 2018, placing Phunware on the NASDAQ exchange.

The company's non-GAAP adjusted net revenues were stated at $19 million in 2019, down from $22.5 million in 2018. The GAAP gross revenue was $19 million in 2019 and $30.8 million in 2018. Fox Networks Group was 50% of the company's 2019 sales, up from 42% the previous year. Phunware's active Fox contract was completed in 2019, meaning the sales could go to zero. The company had 93 employees at the end of 2019, after reducing their workforce by 44. In March 2020 the company furloughed 37 people.

In 2020, Wikipedia co-founder Larry Sanger served on their advisory board.

On April 10, 2020, Phunware received $6.1 million in federally backed small business loans from JP Morgan Chase as part of the Paycheck Protection Program. The company received scrutiny over this loan for its connections to Donald Trump and Fox News. In defense, Crowder (COO) said companies that didn't apply "aren't doing their fiduciary duty", and said "Banks aren't loaning to unprofitable tech companies. There is no access to capital".

On April 17, 2020, the company received a delisting notice from NASDAQ due to the stock trading below a dollar. However, the company's shares increased to above a dollar before the stock was delisted.

On October 19, 2021, Phunware acquired computer system provider Lyte technology for $10.98 million to support their blockchain research and development efforts.

In October 2024, Phunware announced that it had developed a new generative AI platform intended to simplify mobile app design and content creation and “drastically reduce” the need for expensive and time-consuming design and development investments. The company’s new AI-powered software-as-a-service platform is said to launch in mid-2025.

In November 2024, Phunware partnered with Parscale and his company, Campaign Nucleus, acquiring a controlling share of the voter engagement app "MyCanvass." This agreement was intended to strengthen Phunware's capabilities in providing voter engagement services to clients for advocacy, political campaigns, and fundraising initiatives. MyCanvass, along with the Generative AI platform will be able to personalize experiences based on demographic information, behavioral information and location.

== Court cases ==
On September 26, 2017, Phunware sued Uber Technologies for $3 million in unpaid services, accusing the ride-sharing company of failing to pay its invoices, court records from The Superior Court of California show. In response, Uber filed suit against Phunware, alleging the software company committed fraud by, among other things, allowing ads for the ride-sharing app to show up on unauthorized third party sites. Former employees said the startup looked for "new ways to diversify its revenue stream."

An October 9, 2020, SEC settlement shows that Phunware agreed to pay a total of $6 million—$4.5 million going to Uber—over claims of fraudulent advertising.
