= Bionicle Heroes =

2006 video game

- Developers: Traveller's Tales; Amaze Entertainment (handheld); Universomo (J2ME)
- Publishers: Eidos Interactive; TT Games Publishing
- Composer: Ian Livingstone
- Platforms: Game Boy Advance; GameCube; J2ME; Nintendo DS; PlayStation 2; Windows; Xbox 360; Wii
- Release: NA: November 14, 2006; EU: November 24, 2006; EU: January 12, 2007 (DS); Wii: NA: April 24, 2007; EU: May 25, 2007
- Genres: Third-person shooter; Run and gun (GBA); First-person shooter (NDS)
- Modes: Single-player, multiplayer

Bionicle Heroes is a 2006 video game published by Eidos Interactive and TT Games Publishing and based on Lego's Bionicle line of constructible action figures. The game was released in November 2006 on PlayStation 2, Xbox 360, GameCube, Microsoft Windows, Game Boy Advance, and Nintendo DS; a Nintendo Wii version was later released in April 2007. The home console and PC versions were developed by Traveller's Tales, while Amaze Entertainment developed the handheld versions. A version of the game for mobile phones, developed by Universomo, was also released. The home console and PC versions of the game are third-person shooters, while the Game Boy Advance version is a run 'n' gun shoot 'em up and the Nintendo DS version is a first-person shooter. The story of Bionicle Heroes, where the player seeks to liberate the island of Voya Nui and its inhabitants from the villainous Piraka, is not canon to the official Bionicle story.

Development for Bionicle Heroes began in 2005. Initially, the home console version was set to be a first-person shooter, but concerns over the game's potential Entertainment Software Rating Board (ESRB) rating led it to be shifted to a third-person perspective. The Nintendo DS version marked the first first-person shooter released on the platform since Metroid Prime Hunters earlier that year. The home console version received mixed reviews from critics, who praised the humour but found the gameplay to be simplistic and repetitive. The Game Boy Advance and Nintendo DS versions received more favorable reviews, being compared favorably to the Contra series and Metroid Prime Hunters, respectively.

== Gameplay ==
=== Home console ===
When the player has collected enough Lego parts in the home console version, they enter Hero Mode, turning golden and becoming invulnerable to all damage.

The home console version of Bionicle Heroes is a single-player third-person shooter. The game is split up into six different elementally-themed worlds as well as a central hub world where the player can purchase upgrades and bonus content. After defeating a Piraka at the end of a world, they move to the Piraka Playground in the hub world. The player can use their collected Lego pieces to purchase comical cutscenes of the villains engaging in "tomfoolery". Three bonus levels are also unlockable, functioning as score challenges where the goal is to defeat as many enemies as possible. The game features 100 collectibles to collect, and each level also contains silver and gold canisters that unlock new items in the hub world's trophy cave. Completed levels can be revisited in a free play mode, where the player can find additional items and collectibles.

On most versions of the game, the player controls the playable Toa character using a controller. On the Nintendo Wii version of the game, control of the camera is instead accomplished through the Wii Remote's IR sensor. The player begins each level with a single mask, with additional ones scattered throughout the level. These masks provide the player with a variety of weapons and abilities, ranging from sniper rifles to shotguns. The active mask can be togged between by the player at any point. If a player's health is reduced to zero, they lose the mask they were wearing. The player can interact with the environment, performing actions similar to how the Force operates in the Lego Star Wars games.

Defeating enemies scatters them into Lego pieces, which can be collected and used in the hub world. Additionally, collecting them adds to the in-game Hero Mode gauge, which activates when completely filled. While in Hero Mode, the player becomes invincible to any damage. This lasts until the player reaches a set point in the level that requires the player use up their Hero Mode charge to activate objects used to progress throughout the level. Hero Mode is also used in boss battles, with the player targeting smaller enemies to build up the gauge to activate a powerful attack against the boss. The game uses an auto-targeting feature that automatically locks on to enemies. This feature only works at certain distances, and will not activate if the player is too close or too far away from an enemy.

=== Nintendo DS ===
The Nintendo DS in-game HUD includes the Hero Mode charge meter at the top as well as health and ammunition meters.

The Nintendo DS version of Bionicle Heroes is a first-person shooter. Like other DS first-person shooters, the game can be controlled entirely with buttons or with a mix of button and touchscreen controls, with the directional pad being used to walk and the touchscreen being used to aim. Defeating enemies results in them crumbling into bricks. These bricks can be used to fill the player's Hero Mode charge meter. When filled, the player's gains temporary invincibility and a boost to the power of weapons. The game features two modes: a single-player campaign and an offline multiplayer mode.

The single-player mode's world is divided into six different areas, with a Piraka boss battle at the end of each world. From the beginning, the player has access to the Zamor Launcher, a weak weapon with unlimited ammunition. Each world features three masks. The first one gives the player a new weapon, and the second and third masks provides an upgrade to the weapon. In addition to weaponry, each mask also offers a unique ability like higher jumping, immunity to lava, or the ability to break boulders. Runes are scattered throughout the worlds, which grant access to cheats.

The multiplayer mode can only be accessed with other consoles that also have a copy of Bionicle Heroes. The multiplayer deathmatch mode pits players against each other in an arena, similar to the ones used in boss battles in the single-player mode. The arenas have multiple tiers, and masks are scattered throughout the arena. Collecting them grants temporary access to a weapon.

=== Game Boy Advance ===
The Game Boy Advance version of Bionicle Heroes is a run 'n' gun shoot 'em up game. The player, controlling a Toa, can move in eight directions as well as strafe. Two types of gunfire can be selected from. Pressing the A button fires a weaker, rapid-fire blast, while pressing the B button results in more concentrated attacks. The exact attack assigned to the B button is determined by which mask the player is wearing and varies from "tight, focused laser beams to slow, exploding mortar rounds".

There are six different types of masks available in the game, and these masks are scattered throughout each level. The game features 19 levels, and previously cleared levels are unlocked in a free play mode where weapons can be switched between at will. Each level features collectible runes, which can be traded in for cheats and unlock able mini-games. Replaying levels is necessary to unlock everything available in the game. After completing each region, the player battles one of the six Piraka.

=== Mobile phone ===
The mobile phone version of Bionicle Heroes is a top-down, 2D action-adventure game. The player can find masks throughout the levels, granting them the powers of the Toa. The masks possess the powers of the four classical elements, granting the player unique abilities. Occasionally, combinations of the four elements will be needed to advance in the game.

== Story ==
=== Setting ===
Bionicle Heroes is set on the fictional island of Voya Nui. The story of the game is not canon to the official Bionicle story. Rather than focusing on adhering to the Bionicle story, TT Games decided to "ensure that there were as many characters from the Bionicle universe in the game as possible". As a result, creatures like Vahki, Visorak, Bohrok that are not native to the island in the official story appear in the game as enemies, and villains from previous stories appear as bosses. The story of the game is progressed through cutscenes, which appear before levels.

=== Synopsis ===
The story of Bionicle Heroes follows a Matoran who has appeared on the island of Voya Nui. Balta, a villager on the island, informs him that the six Piraka have taken control of the island and transformed its inhabitants into monsters. Balta gives the Matoran a mask and tasks the new Toa with defeating the Piraka and saving the island. As the game progresses, the player defeats all six Piraka. A seventh Piraka, Vezon, is revealed to control the Mask of Life. After defeating him, the Toa regains the mask and restores peace to the island.

The Game Boy Advance and Nintendo DS versions have a different story from the home console version. In these games, the Toa Inika have been defeated by the Piraka and stripped of their masks. A Matoran is transformed into a new Toa and sets out to defeat the Piraka, return the masks to the Toa Inika, and restore peace to the island.

== Development and release ==
The development of Bionicle Heroes began in late 2005. The decision was made early on to not follow the official Bionicle story, as ignoring it would allow more flexibility in game development and enemy variety. According to director Jon Burton, the home console version of the game was initially planned to be a first-person shooter. This stage of development lasted into February 2006. At the time, almost all first-person shooter games received "M" ratings from the Entertainment Software Rating Board (ESRB), and preliminary submissions to the ESRB resulted in ratings that Lego found to be unacceptable despite the lack of blood, gore, or other characteristics typical of "M"-rated games. In order to bring Bionicle Heroes down to an acceptable "E" or "E10+" rating, the decision was made to convert the game into a third-person shooter. The Game Boy Advance and Nintendo DS versions of the game were developed by parallel teams at Amaze Entertainment. The DS version marked the first first-person shooter game released on the platform since Metroid Prime Hunters earlier the same year. A version of the game was also developed for mobile phones by Universomo.

Bionicle Heroes was officially announced in May 2006, with a showcase set for E3 2006. The E3 demo showcased the basic gameplay of the console version of the game, with the fundamental mechanics well in place. Erik Brudvig of IGN noted that it was expected the game would be aimed at kids, but he was surprised by it being a "quite sophisticated action-adventure game that looks to contain a complete experience". Alex Navarro of GameSpot noted similarities to the Lego Star Wars games in terms of visual presentation and charm. Bionicle Heroes was released on all platforms on November 14, 2006, with the exception of the Wii version, which came out on April 24, 2007. In Europe, the game was released on November 24, 2006 for all platforms except for the DS and Wii versions, which were released on January 12 and May 25, 2007, respectively.

== Reception ==
Reception

Aggregate score
Aggregator	Score
Metacritic	DS: 72/100; NGC: 51/100; PC: 59/100; PS2: 52/100; X360: 59/100; WII: 52/100

Review scores
Publication	Score
Eurogamer	X360: 6/10
G4	X360: 2/5
GameSpot	DS: 7.7/10; GBA: 7.7/10; NGC/PC/PS2: 5.2/10; WII: 4.0/10; X360: 5.1/10
IGN	DS: 8.0/10; GBA: 8.0/10; PS2/X360: 7.9/10; WII: 5.0/10
Nintendo Power	NGC: 50/100
Pocket Gamer	DS: 3.5/5; Mobile: 2.5/5
TeamXbox	X360: 7.2/10
VideoGamer.com	X360: 5/10

According to review aggregator Metacritic, the home console version of Bionicle Heroes received "mixed or average" reviews from critics. The Xbox 360 version of the game received an average score of 59/100. While the game's humour and visual presentation received praise, critics felt the gameplay was too repetitive and simplistic. Critics regarded the Wii version as an inferior port, lambasting its poor implementation of motion controls.

Chris Shepperd of Nintendo Power praised the game's visuals, but felt that "pretty much everything else about the game has issues" and that the worst problem was that it didn't feel like a Lego game. VideoGamer.com reviewer Tom Orry argued the game had no appeal outside of Bionicle fans, who might be willing to tolerate the "merely competent action game gameplay". GameSpot was sharply critical of the gameplay, deeming it a "truly mind-numbing, unsatisfying experience", although the site did offer praise for the game's humour. Kristan Reed of Eurogamer praised the humour and accessibility to younger gamers, but felt Bionicle Heroes was too easy and too similar on the whole to Lego Star Wars; he recommended it only to fans of Lego Star Wars and younger gamers. Nate Ahearn of TeamXbox said that "while the game can't really stand on its own, when compared to the rest of the childrens' [sic] games on the Xbox 360... Bionicle Heroes fares pretty well" and said it was a "worthy addition to a game library that is probably totally devoid of titles for the little ones of the house". IGN reviewer Mark Bozon called it "one heck of a licensed game", offering praise to the level design, visuals, and strong appeal to younger gamers. Jason D'Aprile of G4 was not impressed with the game but felt that younger players might enjoy it and concluded his review by writing, "It's hard to find shooters aimed at kids, so on that level, Bionicle is an ok choice. Older gamers, however, will want to pass this one by."

The Nintendo DS version of Bionicle Heroes received more favorable reviews than the home console version. On Metacritic, it has an average score of 72/100, indicating "mixed or average reviews". Critics compared the game favorably to Metroid Prime Hunters but reserved some criticism for the control scheme, noting it to be not quite as good as that game. The game's local multiplayer mode received praise, but the lack of an online mode was seen as disappointing. Lucas Thomas of IGN called it "a satisfying shooter experience that fans of the genre shouldn't ignore". Thomas said it is "worthy of a place in every Samus Aran fan's library" and praised its graphics, enemy design, and offline multiplayer functionality. In his review, Frank Provo of GameSpot said that, with exception of its lack of online multiplayer, Bionicle Heroes "delivers everything else that you could want in a first-person shooter". Provo dubbed it a "top-flight FPS", offering praise for both its single-player and multiplayer modes. Pocket Gamer reviewer Mark Walbank praised the game's progression system as "beautifully structured". He called the game "highly competent" but not truly great and reserved criticism for the controls and enemy variety.

The Game Boy Advance version of Bionicle Heroes received positive reviews. Critics noted its impressive number of on-screen enemies and explosions, graphics, and its fast-paced gameplay, comparing it favorably to the Contra series. Its soundtrack also received praise, especially in comparison to other Game Boy Advance games. The gameplay was generally noted as being fun, although its repetition received some criticism. Lucas Thomas of IGN praised is as a "high octane experience like you'd never expect from a game based on plastic building blocks" and "an impressive title in both graphical presentation and sound design". Frank Provo of GameSpot said the game "rekindles loving memories of such classics as Ikari Warriors or the top-down levels in Contra III". However, Provo felt it bore only a "tenuous and mostly cosmetic" tie to Bionicle, which might disappoint some fans expecting a more faithful adaption. Max Zeschitz of Planet Gameboy gave the game a score of 80%, praising the visuals, soundtrack, and gameplay; he was more critical of the length, but still recommended the game to even those who aren't Bionicle fans.

Jon Mundy of Pocket Gamer criticized the mobile phone version of the game, calling it "dull and unimaginative".
