= Universomo =

Finnish video game developer (2002–2010)

Universomo Ltd.
- Type: Subsidiary
- Industry: Video games
- Founded: 2002; 24 years ago
- Defunct: March 2, 2010
- Fate: Shuttered
- Headquarters: Tampere, Finland
- Products: The Force Unleashed de Blob
- Parent: THQ (2007–2010)

Universomo Ltd. was a Finnish video game developer based in Tampere, Finland, founded in 2002, and acquired by THQ on May 9, 2007. Universomo also had offices in Helsinki, Finland and San Diego, United States. The studio focused on games for mobile phones, the iPhone and the N-Gage. On January 12, 2010, THQ announced the Nintendo DS title Beat City, developed by Universomo, marking the developer's first entry to the handheld gaming market.

On March 2, 2010, Universomo's closure was announced. This left THQ Wireless without any studios under its umbrella, so that development of its games would thenceforth be outsourced to external studios.

Universomo was best known for the favorably reviewed mobile and iPhone versions of de Blob, the mobile, iPhone and N-Gage versions of Star Wars: The Force Unleashed and the mobile versions of Lego Star Wars: The Video Game.

== Games ==
- Beat City
- Star Wars: Cantina
- WWE Smackdown vs. Raw 2010
- Treasure Grab
- Indiana Jones and the Lost Puzzles
- Up
- Prison Tycoon
- Star Wars: The Clone Wars
- Wall-E
- Pass The Pigs
- Chop Sushi!
- Super Fruitfall
- Star Wars: The Force Unleashed
- de Blob
- Indiana Jones and the Kingdom of the Crystal Skull
- Puzzle Quest: Warlords
- Playboy Pool Party
- Snood Blaster
- Ratatouille: Cheese Rush
- Destroy All Humans! Crypto Does Vegas
- MX vs. ATV: Untamed
- Juiced 2
- Stuntman Ignition
- Ocean's 13
- Emergency Mayhem
- 300: The Mobile Game
- Lego Star Wars
- Lego Star Wars II Mobile
- Stones of Khufu
- Destroy All Humans! 2
- Rollercoaster Rush
- Magic Inlay
- Bionicle Heroes
- Juiced Eliminator
- Bounce Out
- Gorillaz Entertainment System
- Habbo Creatures
- Habbo Dreams
- Get Rich or Die Tryin'
- Gem Drop
- PileUp!
- Star Wars Battle Above Coruscant
- Stunt Plane
- Sumo Smash!
- Jumbo Rumble
- Bones Adventuring Co.
- Trails of Terror - Mutiny
- Kloner - Together in the Dark
- Bones - The First Adventure
