= Baby Life =

2008 video game

- Developer: Pasta Games
- Publisher: Deep Silver
- Platform: Nintendo DS
- Release: EU: November 28, 2008
- Genre: Life simulation game
- Mode: Single-player

Baby Life is a simulation for the Nintendo DS by French studio Pasta Games. The gameplay of the game is somewhat similar with the Tamagotchi games but more complex.

== Development ==
The game was published by Deep Silver, the games label of digital entertainment company Koch Media, and French publisher Game Life. Game Life had previously released the title Horse Life which had demonstrated the concept. The game was a Nintendo DS exclusive that was released at the end of 2008. Koch Media owned the publishing rights for all PAL regions. The game was previewed at the Games Convention 2008 alongside Horse Life 2.

== Gameplay ==
In the game, players take control of their personal babies. from age 9 to 15 months. They teach the baby speech, movement, and behaviour. Over 100 clothing items can be accessed, either to use or to trade over Wi-Fi. The game utilises NDS features such as the speech system and the stylus. Emmanuel Drouin, managing director of Game Life, said that the game allows players to interact with the "most lovely hero you can have in a videogame: a baby".

== Critical reception ==
Softpedia described the gameplay as "clearly more complex and probably even more fun" than a Tamagotchi. Pocket Gamer jokingly argued that the game is an alternative to those who want a baby but who are unwilling or unable to attract a member of the opposite sex.
