= Reaxion =

American mobile game publisher

Reaxion Corp.
- Company type: Corporation
- Industry: Video games
- Founded: 2001; 25 years ago
- Headquarters: Seattle, Washington
- Products: Men in Black; Shop 'til You Drop; Fightality
- Website: www.reaxion.com

Reaxion Corp was a Seattle-based mobile game publishing company. While its primary business is developing and publishing games for mobile phones, Reaxion has also produced several other types of mobile applications, including a mobile Content Management System. Reaxion produces a number of well-known mobile games in a variety of genres, including puzzle, fighting, sports, and strategy. Games from Reaxion include Men in Black, Kojak, Shop 'Til You Drop and Frame Games. Reaxion also manages a mobile gaming community called Gamarama, which allows users to compete in several mobile games using their phones. Reaxion has relationships with all major North American wireless service carriers, such as Sprint, Verizon, and Cingular, as well as several other North American and some major European and Asian carriers

In addition to publishing mobile games, Reaxion also has an in-house development department that does most of its software development work for both the BREW and Java ME platforms. Reaxion's development team also manages the quality assurance process. In addition, Reaxion does all of its own marketing and advertising.

== History ==
Reaxion was founded in 2001 as a mobile game development and publishing company. The company is headquartered in Seattle, WA (Executive, Sales & Finance) and has a test and QA office in San Diego. In addition, the company maintains wholly owned subsidiary offices in Moscow (Development, Creative, Product Marketing, & Russia & Direct Sales) and Minsk (Development). In 2002, the company released the first commercially available BREW extension, an XML parser. Then, in 2003, it released the first commercially available MMS client on BREW. In 2004, Reaxion acquired the Java ME developer 3SYM. More recently, Reaxion closed a $2M Series A investment from i-Hatch Venture Partners in August 2005.

Games Developed and/or Published by Reaxion: Following is a partial list of the games that Reaxion has published. List Updated: November 13/11/2023

- Detective Puzzles
- Men in Black: Alien Assault
- Fightality
- Sexy Mahjong
- Incadia
- Frame Games
- The Longest Yard
- Shop 'til You Drop
- Pro Curling
- Mahjong Deluxe
- Minigolf 2
- Yetisports
- Hero's Quest
- Hive of Evil
- Solitaire Top 12 Multipack
- Evil Knievel Pinball
- Deal or No Deal
- All Grown Up
- Australian Safari
- PAX Athletica
- Evel Knievel Evel-ution
- Pro Curling

Reaxion was closed in June 2010.
