= All Kamen Rider: Rider Generation =

- Developer: 7thChord
- Publisher: Bandai Namco Games
- Series: Kamen Rider
- Platform: Nintendo DS
- Release: JP: August 4, 2011
- Genre: Beat 'em up
- Mode: Single-player

All Kamen Rider: Rider Generation (オール仮面ライダー ライダージェネレーション, Ōru Kamen Raidā Raidā Generēshon) is a Bandai Namco Nintendo DS video game featuring the protagonists of the Kamen Rider Series.

== Rider Generation 2 ==
All Kamen Rider: Rider Generation 2
- Developer: Bandai Namco Games
- Publisher: Bandai Namco Games
- Series: Kamen Rider
- Platforms: Nintendo DS; PlayStation Portable
- Release: JP: August 2, 2012
- Genre: Beat 'em up
- Modes: Single-player, multiplayer

A sequel titled All Kamen Rider: Rider Generation 2 (オール仮面ライダー ライダージェネレーション2, Ōru Kamen Raidā Raidā Generēshon Tsū) was released on August 2, 2012. It features Kamen Rider Fourze from Kamen Rider Fourze as the main character, as well as various others secondary Kamen Riders.

This is the second to last original game ever released for the Nintendo DS in Japan. The final original title released for the system was Tokumei Sentai Go-Busters.

== Rider Revolution ==
All Kamen Rider: Rider Revolution
- Developer: Bandai Namco Games
- Publisher: Bandai Namco Games
- Series: Kamen Rider
- Platform: Nintendo 3DS
- Release: JP: December 1, 2016
- Genre: Beat 'em up
- Mode: Single-player

All Kamen Rider: Rider Revolution (オール仮面ライダー ライダーレボリューション, Ōru Kamen Raidā Raidā Reboryūshon) was released on December 1, 2016. It features Kamen Rider Ex-Aid from Kamen Rider Ex-Aid as the main character, as well as various others secondary Kamen Riders.
