= Best of Tests DS =

2008 video game

- Developer: Otaboo
- Publishers: WW: Conspiracy Entertainment; EU: Neko Entertainment
- Platform: Nintendo DS
- Release: NA: March 4, 2008; PAL: April 4, 2008
- Genres: Educational game Puzzle game
- Modes: Single-player, multiplayer

Best of Tests DS is an educational video game released for Nintendo DS in North America on March 4, 2008. The game intends to present tests and puzzles that will help stimulate one's Intelligent Quotient or "IQ" through five categories: logic, observation, memory, speed of perception and analysis. The game contains three gaming modes: Training, Memory and Tests. Best of Tests DS calculates the player's IQ and adapts the difficulty level in order to provide a personalized challenge that is always renewed and updated.

== Reception ==
Reception

Aggregate score
Aggregator	Score
Metacritic	32/100

Review scores
Publication	Score
GamesRadar+	2.5/5
GameZone	2.5/10
IGN	2/10

Best of Tests DS received negative reviews from critics upon release. On Metacritic, the game holds a score of 32/100 based on 8 reviews, indicating "generally unfavorable reviews".
