= Beat City =

2010 video game

- North American cover art
- Developer(s): Universomo
- Publisher(s): THQ
- Director(s): Sami Hangaslammi
- Producer(s): Mikko Karvonen
- Platform(s): Nintendo DS
- Release: NA: April 20, 2010; EU: June 11, 2010; AU: 2010
- Genre(s): Rhythm
- Mode(s): Single-player, multiplayer

Beat City is a 2010 rhythm video game developed by Universomo and published by THQ for the Nintendo DS. It was released on April 20, 2010, in North America, and in Europe on June 11, 2010. It was the first and only video game to be developed for a handheld system by Universomo, who mostly worked on mobile games and was shuttered a month before the game's release.

== Production ==
Production on the game took place in mid-to-late 2009 and early 2010. It was confirmed for a release in April 2010 on January 12, 2010.

== Plot ==
The game stars a resident of Beat City who loves music named Synchronizer. He meets a purple alien whale named Groovy Whale who gives him the ability to control music and implants a giant speaker in his head. His hometown is being taken over by an evil music-hating organization called the Cacophony, led by failed opera singer Dame Isolde Minor. With the help of Groovy Whale and his love interest, a girl he meets later named Beatrice, he must bring life, color, and happiness back to the city and start a "rhythm revolution," while also helping Groovy Whale get back to his home planet.

== Gameplay ==
The game is played with the DS turned sideways, similarly to Rhythm Heaven on the same platform, with the action taking place on one screen, while the player must use the stylus on the other. The player proceeds through several different stages, each with its own set of rules. In most of the games the player plays as Synchronizer, but there are a few that feature other characters. There are three controls: tap, swipe (also known as flicking), and hold. Each stage begins with a tutorial where the stage is black and the player must figure out what to do. As you play through a stage, it will get increasingly more colorful and upbeat the better you do. Depending on the player's progress, you can build a set of stairs at the end of every day to help get Groovy Whale get closer to his home planet. Each stage measures your quality based on a percentage, and if you get an 80% or higher you can unlock a character in the "Beat Album," a short profile of the characters featured in the game.

== Reception ==
The game received mixed to positive reviews from critics and players. Some people called it "bland" and "pointless," and others criticized it for being short or for being "a ripoff of" Rhythm Heaven, whereas others praised it for having a unique plot and characters. One critic said that "(its) delightful presentation and super catchy chiptune soundtrack will get your toes tapping and your head banging in no time." One source said that "if you love Rhythm Heaven, you'll love Beat City. Simple as that." NintendoWorldReport gave it an average rating of 7.5/10.
