= Brain Assist =

2007 video game

- European cover art
- Developer: Japan Art Media
- Publisher: Sega
- Composers: Seiichiro Matsumura; Mariko Nanba
- Platform: Nintendo DS
- Release: JP: 21 June 2007; NA: 26 February 2008; EU: 14 March 2008; AU: 21 March 2008
- Genres: Puzzle, educational
- Modes: Single-player, multiplayer

Brain Assist, known in Japan as Touch de Uno! DS (タッチ･デ･ウノー！DS, Tatchi de Unō! DS), is a puzzle video game released for the Nintendo DS in Japan, North America, and the PAL regions. Studies in the 1960s demonstrated the lateralization of brain function. The left-brain hemisphere deals with sequential analysis - reasoning using language, mathematics, abstraction and reasoning. Memory is primarily stored in a language format. The right-brain hemisphere deals with auditory, visual, and spatial concepts (art, for example) dancing and gymnastics, which is what the game aims to stimulate in the player.

== Reception ==
Reception

Aggregate score
Aggregator	Score
Metacritic	53/100

Review scores
Publication	Score
Eurogamer	1/10
GamesMaster	62%
GameSpot	5/10
GamesRadar+	2/5
GameZone	6.4/10
IGN	7/10
Jeuxvideo.com	5/20
PALGN	4/10
Pocket Gamer	2.5/5
VideoGamer.com	6/10

The game received "mixed" reviews according to the review aggregation website Metacritic. Emily Ballistrieri of GamePro said, "Maybe if the whole game had as much character as that one backdrop they'd have something, but the way it stands, even with its budget price, Brain Assist is a game you can walk right by." (Note: GamePro gave the game 2.25/5 for graphics, 3/5 for sound, 3.25/5 for control, and 1.75/5 for fun factor.)
