= Cake Mania =

2006 video game

- Developers: Sandlot Games; Digital Embryo (DS); Astraware (Palm OS); Red Marble Games (Mac OS); Mr.Goodliving Studios (Java ME); Coresoft (PS2); Gorilla Systems (Wii)
- Publishers: Sandlot Games; Majesco (DS, Wii); Eidos Interactive (DS, EU); Mr.Goodliving Studios (Java ME); Destineer (PS2)
- Designer: Andrew Lum
- Platforms: Windows, Adobe Flash Player, Nintendo DS, Palm OS, Java ME, Mac OS, PlayStation Portable, PlayStation 2, Wii
- Release: 2006: Palm OS; WW: October 11, 2006 Nintendo DS; NA: April 9, 2007 Java ME; NA: March 2007 Mac OS; WW: September 27, 2007 Wii; NA: November 24, 2008; EU: July 31, 2009 PlayStation 2; NA: August 15, 2008 PlayStation Portable; NA: October 23, 2008
- Genre: Strategy
- Modes: Single-player, multiplayer

Cake Mania is a cooking time management video game developed and published by Sandlot Games in 2006. Some ports of Cake Mania have different titles; the Wii version is known as Cake Mania: In the Mix!, and the PlayStation 2 and PlayStation Portable versions are titled Cake Mania: Bakers Challenge. Cake Mania received mixed reviews from critics, with some reviewers praising the game's 'addictive' and 'simple' casual gameplay, while others criticized this as being 'repetitive' and 'shallow'.

== Plot ==
Jill Evans, who was inspired by her baker grandparents, developed a love for pastry cooking and went to a culinary school. When Jill comes back from culinary school, she finds her grandparents' bakery, Evans' Bakery, closed. Jill decides to open her own bakery at her house and work her way up the business ladder so she can buy back her grandparents' bakery. She also learns how to deal with some very tricky customers along the way. Once successful, she is able to reclaim the bakery's deed and reopen Evans Bakery.

=== Cake Mania: Back to the Bakery ===
Taking place shortly after the events of the first game, Jill tries to win her grandparents a Hawaiian cruise vacation while renovating the bakery. She eventually succeeds after winning the Cake Mania Bake-Off contest.

== Sequels ==
=== Cake Mania 2 ===
Jill is requested help from her friends: Risha, Jack, and later Agent Bundt, to help with their business problems. Throughout the game, she must decide whom to help. The storyline will change depending on the player's choices, leading to one of the six alternate endings.

=== Cake Mania 3 ===
While preparing for her wedding with her fiancé Jack, a mystical crystal ball called the Time Bender is shattered, transporting Jill, her grandparents, Risha, Agent Bundt, and Tiny to different time periods just as Jack arrives. Jill must use her baking skills to save them, repair the Time Bender, and later return all the time-displaced people back to their time periods in order to get back to the present time and prepare for her wedding. Once successful, Jill must then finish making her wedding cake so the wedding can finally take place.

=== Cake Mania: Main Street ===
After her favorite shop closes down due to people now being interesting in a modern shopping mall called Baker's Corner, Jill becomes determined to reopen all the shops on the main street with the help of Jack and their friends Risha and Tiny. After all shops are reopened, they learn that Baker's Corner has closed down and is replaced with a mini-golf course. Jill is offered to be mayor of Bakersfield, but she needs more time to decide on that.

=== Cake Mania: Lights, Camera, Action ===
Now pregnant and expecting a child soon, Jill must help two other friends take part in a movie shooting event run by a movie director named Michel Be, with Tiny being hired as an actor. However, Jill and Risha's shops are being modified for the movie scenes, which upsets Jill. The people of Bakersfield grow annoyed with Be and complain to the mayor since Be hasn't paid them for their services. Risha goes to confront Be, but discovers that he has escaped with the money, revealing that he is scam artist. She decides to finish the movie herself. Once it is done, Jill and Jack watch it, but Jill suddenly goes into labor. At the hospital, Jill gives birth to a boy and a girl, whom she names Oliver and Rose.

=== Cake Mania: To the Max! ===
Now a mother to twins, Jill and Jack look through their photo album. The story goes through flashbacks of Jill's childhood, which ends with Jill trying on a new dress that she got from Risha before they go to a prom.

== Gameplay ==
As Jill, the player bakes and decorates cakes, trying to fulfill customer's orders as quickly as possible

The player controls Jill, a baker. Customers come in and line up, giving Jill their orders. The player must then direct Jill to create the cake each customer wants, before the customer becomes tired of waiting and leaves, whereupon Jill loses a life. If Jill runs out of lives, the player loses the level and must try again from the most recent checkpoint. Cakes in Cake Mania are created using the oven and the frosting machine; the cake has to be a specific shape and have a certain color of icing for each order. If the wrong cake is made the player can throw it away. In later levels, cakes are more complex to make, such as orders requiring several layers of cake and extra cake decorations. Different customers have different gameplay quirks (such as preferring a certain feature on their cakes) and differing levels of patience, and Jill can use purchasable items such as cupcakes and a television to help keep her customers patient while they wait. Each level takes place in a different month, and holiday-themed customers appear such as Cupid and Santa Claus in February and December, respectively. Virtual money earned in the game can be used to buy additional baking equipment such as a second oven, better frosting machine, cupcake microwave, or faster shoes to make Jill move faster.

=== Version differences ===
Both the PlayStation 2 and PlayStation Portable versions of Cake Mania: Bakers Challenge and the Nintendo DS version of Cake Mania include features from Cake Mania: Back to the Bakery, which was released as an expansion on PC and Java ME-supported phones. The original PC game has 48 stages, and 84 with the expansion. The Wii version of Cake Mania: In the Mix! has a co-op multiplayer mode, an endless mode, a cake frosting minigame, the ability to run a catering business, and advertise in the newspaper. Cake Mania: Bakers Challenge has an endless mode, as well as the "Baker's Challenge" mode, wherein items in Jill's kitchen, customers, and the business hours may be adjusted.

== Development ==
Cake Mania was developed in St. Petersburg, Russia by Sandlot Games. Cake Mania was originally released on PC as a browser-based flash game version accessible for free on sites such as MSN Games, Big Fish Games, and RealArcade; it was the most downloaded PC game of 2006, with 55 million downloads. While Cake Mania could be played for free in browsers, the browser version is a demo that lacks all the levels and features of the full version, such as the ability to buy upgrades. The sites hosting the game, such as MSN Games, also sold the full release of the game, which could then be downloaded. In addendum to charging for the full release, Cake Mania was also supported by browser-based advertising.

The Nintendo DS port was developed by Digital Embryo and published by Majesco (US) and Eidos Interactive (Europe), and was first exhibited at the 2007 Consumer Electronics Show. Cake Mania was released on DS on April 9, 2007 in the United States as a budget title. The Wii version titled Cake Mania: In the Mix! was released November 24, 2008 in the United States, The Europe/PAL release of In the Mix! was developed by Gorilla Systems and distributed by Codemasters, but still published by Majesco, and was released in early 2009.

Cake Mania was released on Palm OS PDAs in October 2006, and was developed by Astraware. The Cake Mania: Back to the Bakery expansion for Palm OS was released in March 2007. Cake Mania was developed and published on Java ME-supported phones in March 2007 by Mr.Goodliving Studios, a subsidiary of RealNetworks. Distributed through the RealArcade label, the Java ME version of Cake Mania could be purchased by text. Cake Mania was also distributed through Movaya's mobile storefront. In September 2007, several months after the release of Cake Mania for phones running Java ME, RealNetworks published a press release stating that the port was successful, writing that Cake Mania was "one of the most downloaded mobile games in the U.S.," on the mobile platform at the time. Cake Mania was released on Mac OS in September 2007, and was developed by Red Marble Games. Cake Mania: Bakers Challenge was released in October 2008 on the PSP. The PlayStation 2 version was published by Destineer and developed by Coresoft, and released on August 15, 2008 in the United States.

== Reception ==
Reception

Aggregate score
Aggregator	Score
Metacritic	55% (DS)

Review scores
Publication	Score
1Up.com	C+ (DS); D (Wii)
Eurogamer	4/10 (DS)
G4	1/5 (DS)
Game Informer	65% (DS)
GamePro	3.5/5 (DS)
GamesMaster	69% (DS)
GameSpot	4/10 (DS)
GameSpy	3/5 (DS)
GamesRadar+	4/10 (DS)
GameZone	7/10 (DS); 6/10 (Wii)
IGN	6.5/10 (DS); 8 of 10 (Java ME); 7/10 (PS2)
Jeuxvideo.com	8/20 (DS)
Macworld	3.5/5 (Mac)
NGamer	55% (DS)
Nintendo Power	55% (DS)
Pocket Gamer	4/5 (Java ME); 2/5 (DS)

Cake Mania's release as a flash game on sites such as MSN Games was successful; it was the most downloaded PC game of 2006 with 55 million downloads, and Adweek stated that Cake Mania captured the female gaming market well, which made up 70% of MSN Gaming's visitors in 2006. The Nintendo DS version of Cake Mania was the version most widely reviewed, and received mixed reviews from critics. The review aggregator website Metacritic gave the DS version of Cake Mania a score of 55 from 100 based on 23 critics' reviews. Metacritic categorised the score as "mixed or average reviews". Some reviews praised Cake Mania's 'addictive' gameplay, while others criticized it as 'repetitive' and 'overly simple'. Many reviewers compared Cake Mania to other service industry-related time management games such as Diner Dash or Tapper. IGN criticized the DS version for 'lack of depth' aside from a "rising difficulty curve", but praised its "cute" graphics. IGN expressed that while simple and repetitive, Cake Mania is a good 'casual' game, summarizing it as "fun but shallow". Eurogamer called the game "limited" and "extremely average", and questioned the value of buying the game when the online flash game is free. Many reviews of the DS version expressed that some small UI elements are difficult to interact with and discern on the small DS screen. Another major criticism of the DS version was that not all of the kitchen is on screen at once, as its scrolled into frame when the player is near, which forces important elements that the player has to keep track of such as the oven offscreen. Pocket Gamer heavily criticized Cake Mania's interface and gameplay, expressing that it becomes "an absolute gameplay abomination" due to the DS version's small UI and scrolling issues, further exasperated by the game's frantic time-based gameplay. Pocket Gamer further criticized Cake Mania as being "repetitive" and having "barely an ounce of depth". Joystiq described Cake Mania as shovelware due to its "lack of depth" and simplistic gameplay, summarizing it as "not as bad as everyone made it out to be but still not fantastic".

1up.com criticized Cake Mania's overly simple and repetitive gameplay, stating that its somewhat fun "if you don't have a ton of other better things to do". 1up.com heavily criticized the DS version's scrolling issues, calling it a "stupid design flaw for such a simple game" and concluded that "if your cell phone comes with awesome free games, you might do just as well wasting your time on those". G4 was heavily critical of the game, calling it "tedious", and further expressed that Cake Mania's gameplay is "repetitive", "frustrating" and like "torture", summarizing the game as a whole as "Play the first level of Cake Mania and you've played them all." In contrast, GameSpy praised Cake Mania's "addictive" gameplay, and while noting it as "repetitive", stated that "it's the kind of repetition that constitutes a challenge more than an annoyance", further stating that the game's difficulty curve adds replay value. The DS version of Cake Mania was nominated for "Best Casual Game" at the 4th British Academy Games Awards. In a May 2008 press release, Majesco announced that the DS version sold 315,000 units prior to its European release.

The Wii version of Cake Mania: In the Mix! received mostly negative reviews, with several reviews heavily criticizing the game's 'overly sensitive' and 'unintuitive' motion controls, and bad level design. 1up.com described the Wii version as "an exercise in frustration" due to the game's controls as well as its "glitchy" interface, further stating that "onscreen items overlap with the menus, rendering them mostly unusable". 1up.com criticized In the Mix's "repetitive" multiplayer and endless modes, expressing that they amplify the issues present in single-player, further calling them "hardly playable".

The Java ME version of Cake Mania received more positive reviews, which praised the game's smooth transition to the mobile platform, with its controls being a particular point of praise. Pocket Gamer noted Cake Mania as "unoriginal", comparing it to other, similar casual games such as Diner Dash, but expressed that the game's fun, and works and plays well on mobile. IGN called the Java ME version "stressful", but expressed that it's a "fun stressful", as the game's repetitive gameplay has a rhythm that they were able to get into. IGN also praised Cake Mania's sense of "personality" and bright & colorful graphics. In contrast, IGN criticized the PlayStation 2 version's control scheme, and expressed that it was "quite easy to accidentally pick a cake shape" due to the controls.

Macworld gave the Macintosh version of Cake Mania a mixed review, and was divided on its casual gameplay, calling it a good "time-waster", but also noted that it "can get pretty exhausting and downright frustrating before too long" due to its difficulty curve. Macworld further expressed that there are many casual games like Cake Mania, and that it doesn't fully distinguish itself from other, similar games in a crowded marketplace.

== Legacy ==
Release timeline
2006	Cake Mania
2007	Cake Mania 2: Jill's Next Adventure!
2008	Cake Mania 3
2009	Cake Mania: Main Street
2010	Cake Mania: Lights, Camera, Action
2011	Cake Mania: To the Max!

A sequel Cake Mania 2: Jill's Next Adventure! was released in 2007. It received a 57/100 aggregate review score on Metacritic, indicating "Mixed or Average" reviews. Reviewers commented that the sequel didn't add much compared to the original, and that the Nintendo DS version had issues with the small screen and touchscreen controls.

Cake Mania 3 was released in 2008 and was rated 7.3/10 by IGN and 6/10 by GameZone. Reviewers commented that it was surprisingly difficult for a casual game.

Three more games in the series titled Cake Mania: Main Street, Cake Mania: Lights, Camera, Action, and Cake Mania: To the Max! were released in 2009, 2010, and 2011 respectively.
