= List of association football video games =

Association football or soccer video games are a subgenre of sports video games. The earliest examples appeared on video game consoles in the late 1970s and early 1980s. Early home computer versions of such games also appeared during the 8-bit era in the early to mid-1980s.

== History ==
=== Early console and 8-bit computer days ===
The first arcade system labeled as "Soccer" came out in 1973, being a variation of Pong in the guise of a soccer game: Taito's Soccer. The first home video game console was the Magnavox Odyssey, which received an association football game with the title Soccer in 1974. This game was controlled by paddles, similar to the Pong games of the time, and relied on a transparent overlay that simulated a soccer pitch on the television. It was essentially a table tennis game with a soccer skin overlaid on it.

In 1977, the launch of the Atari VCS (also known as the Atari 2600), based on the inexpensive MOS 6502 microprocessor architecture, brought video gaming to many homes. This was the first successful mass-market modular video game console, and it made it possible to play a variety of different games on the same console. In 1980, Atari's Pelé's Soccer/Championship Soccer became the first console association football game to be playable at home. It resembled an actual football pitch much more than previous games, featuring a scrolling field, and it also had a celebration screen, a novelty for video games at the time. The graphics, although still crude by modern standards, were considered much better than in the Pong variants that preceded it. The 1983 updated Atari RealSports Soccer improved the graphics and gameplay, under the RealSports brand of updates to several sport video games. Its release happened around the time of the video game industry crash of 1983.

In the early 1980s, the 8-bit home computer market, also based on the MOS 6502 microprocessor architecture, was going well. In 1982, the first successful home computer version of an association football game, called simply Soccer, was launched by Thorn EMI for the Atari 800 range of computers, both on cartridges and on 5¼-inch floppy disks. The launch of the Commodore 64, also in 1982, brought home computers to many more households, and the development of association football video games really took off. The 16-bit home computer era of the latter 1980s continued the trend.

== Arcade games ==
The first association football arcade game was released one year after Atari's Pong machines: Taito's Soccer (1973). It resembled a 2-player Pong game in both graphics and gameplay. Over the decades that followed, many more arcade association football game machines were produced.

- Back Street Soccer
- Exciting Soccer
- Football Champ
- Goal Kick
- LiberoGrande
- Pro Soccer
- Soccer
- Super Sidekicks
  - Super Sidekicks
  - Super Sidekicks 2: The World Championship
  - Super Sidekicks 3: The Next Glory
  - Neo Geo Cup '98: The Road to the Victory
  - The Ultimate 11: SNK Football Championship
- Tehkan World Cup
  - Tecmo World Cup '90
- Video Action
- Virtua Striker
- Virtua Striker 2
  - Virtua Striker 2 version '98
  - Virtua Striker 2 version '99
  - Virtua Striker 2 version '99.1
  - Virtua Striker 2 version 2000
  - Virtua Striker 2 version 2000.1
- Virtua Striker 3
  - Virtua Striker 3 version 2002
- Virtua Striker 4
  - Virtua Striker 4 version 2006
- Winning Eleven Arcade Game Style
  - Winning Eleven Arcade Game Style 2003
  - Winning Eleven 2006 Arcade Championship
  - Winning Eleven Arcade Championship 2008
  - Winning Eleven Arcade Championship 2010
  - Winning Eleven Arcade Championship 2012
- World Championship Soccer

== Video game consoles ==
=== Atari ===
==== Atari VCS (2600) ====
- Pelé's Soccer/Championship Soccer
- RealSports Soccer
- International Soccer

==== Atari 5200 ====
- RealSports Soccer

==== Atari Jaguar ====
- Sensible Soccer
- Fever Pitch Soccer

==== Atari Lynx ====
- World Class Fussball/Soccer

=== Nintendo ===
Note: consoles are listed in chronological order (first handhelds, then home consoles), while individual games or series are in alphabetical order.

==== Game Boy ====
- Elite Soccer
- FIFA International Soccer
- FIFA Soccer 96
- FIFA 97
- FIFA: Road to World Cup 98
- Football International
- Goal!
- International Superstar Soccer
- J-League Fighting Soccer: The King of Ace Strikers
- J-League Supporter Soccer
- J-League Live '95
- J-League Winning Goal
- Matthias Sammer Soccer
- Nintendo World Cup
- Sensible Soccer: European Champions
- Soccer Mania
- Super Kick Off
- World Cup 98
- World Cup USA '94

==== Game Boy Color ====
- David Beckham Soccer
- David O'Leary's Total Soccer 2000
- The F.A. Premier League Stars 2001
- FIFA 2000
- International Superstar Soccer 99
- International Superstar Soccer 2000
- Mia Hamm Soccer Shootout
- O'Leary Manager 2000
- Player Manager 2001
- Pocket Soccer
- Ronaldo V-Soccer
- Soccer Manager
- Three Lions
- Zidane: Football Generation

==== Game Boy Advance ====
- 2006 FIFA World Cup
- Alex Ferguson's Player Manager 2002
- David Beckham Soccer
- Disney Sports Soccer
- European Super League
- FIFA Football 2003
- FIFA Football 2004
- FIFA Football 2005
- FIFA 06
- FIFA 07
- Football Mania
- Formation Soccer 2002
- Go! Go! Beckham! Adventure on Soccer Island
- International Superstar Soccer
- International Superstar Soccer Advance
- J.League Pocket
- J.League Pocket 2
- J-League Pro Soccer Club wo Tsukurou! Advance
- J-League Winning Eleven Advance 2002
- Monster Battle Soccer
- O'Leary Manager 2000
- Premier Action Soccer
- Premier Manager 2003–04
- Premier Manager 2004–2005
- Premier Manager 2005–2006
- Soccer Kid
- Steven Gerrard's Total Soccer 2002
- Total Soccer Manager
- Ultimate Beach Soccer
- XS Jr. League Soccer
- Wi-El: World Soccer Winning Eleven
- World Advance Soccer: Road to Win
- Zidane: Football Generation 2002

==== Nintendo DS ====
- Fab 5 Soccer
- FIFA 06
- FIFA 07
- FIFA 08
- FIFA 09
- FIFA 10
- FIFA 11
- FIFA Street 2
- FIFA Street 3
- FIFA World Cup: Germany 2006
- Foot 2 Rue Nicolas Anelka
- Football Academy
- Football Director DS
- Ico Soccer
- Imagine: Soccer Captain
- Inazuma Eleven
- Inazuma Eleven 2: Firestorm
- Inazuma Eleven 2: Blizzard
- Inazuma Eleven 3: Sekai e no Chousen!! Bomber
- Inazuma Eleven 3: Sekai e no Chousen!! Spark
- Inazuma Eleven 3: Sekai e no Chousen!! The Ogre
- Jake Power: Soccer Star
- Pro Evolution Soccer 6
- Pro Evolution Soccer 2008
- Real Football 2008
- Real Football 2009

==== Nintendo 3DS ====
- FIFA 12
- FIFA 13
- FIFA 14
- FIFA 15
- Inazuma Eleven GO: Light
- Inazuma Eleven GO: Shadow
- Inazuma Eleven GO Chrono Stones: Thunderflash
- Inazuma Eleven GO Chrono Stones: Wildfire
- Inazuma Eleven GO Galaxy: Big Bang
- Inazuma Eleven GO Galaxy: Supernova
- Mario Sports Superstars
- Pro Evolution Soccer 2012
- Pro Evolution Soccer 2013
- Pro Evolution Soccer 2014

==== Nintendo Entertainment System/Famicom ====
- 4 Soccer Simulators
- Captain Tsubasa Vol. II: Super Striker
- Goal!
- Goal Two!
- Kick and Run
- Kick Off
- Konami Hyper Soccer
- Nintendo World Cup
- Power Soccer
- Soccer
- Tecmo Cup Soccer
- Tecmo World Cup Soccer
- Top Striker
- Ultimate League Soccer
- World Trophy Soccer

==== Super Nintendo Entertainment System/Super Famicom ====
- Ace Striker
- Battle Soccer: Field no Hasha
- Battle Soccer 2
- Capcom's Soccer Shootout
- Captain Tsubasa 3: Koutei no Chousen
- Captain Tsubasa 4: Pro no Rival Tachi
- Captain Tsubasa 5: Hasha no Shōgō Campione
- Championship Soccer '94
- Champions World Class Soccer
- Dino Dini's Goal
- Dolucky no A.League Soccer
- Elite Soccer
- Fever Pitch Soccer
- FIFA International Soccer
- FIFA Soccer '96
- FIFA Soccer '97 Gold Edition
- FIFA: Road to World Cup 98
- Football Champ
- Goal!
- Goal! Two
- Hat Trick Hero 2
- International Superstar Soccer
- International Superstar Soccer Deluxe
- J.League Soccer Prime Goal
- J.League Soccer Prime Goal 2
- J.League Soccer Prime Goal 3
- J.League Super Soccer '95 Jikkyō Stadium
- Kevin Keegan's Player Manager
- Kick Off 3: European Challenge
- Manchester United Championship Soccer
- Mega Man Soccer
- Sensible Soccer
- Shijō Saikyō League Serie A: Ace Striker
- Soccer Kid
- Striker (video game)
- Super Copa
- Super Formation Soccer 94
- Super Formation Soccer 95: della Serie A
- Super Formation Soccer 96: World Club Edition
- Super Goal! 2
- Super Kick-Off
- Super Soccer
- Super Soccer Champ
- Tactical Soccer
- Tony Meola's Sidekick Soccer
- Ultra League
- Virtual Soccer
- World Cup USA '94
- World League Soccer
- World Soccer '94: Road to Glory
- Zenkoku Kōkō Soccer 2
- Zico Soccer

==== Nintendo 64 ====
- FIFA '99
- FIFA: Road to World Cup 98
- FIFA Soccer 64
- International Superstar Soccer '98
- International Superstar Soccer 2000
- International Superstar Soccer 64
- J World Soccer 3
- J-League Dynamite Soccer 64
- J-League Tactics Soccer
- Jikkyo World Soccer: World Cup France '98
- Mia Hamm Soccer 64
- Premier Manager 64
- World Cup 98
- World League Soccer 2000

==== GameCube ====
- 2002 FIFA World Cup
- Disney Sports Soccer
- ESPN MLS ExtraTime 2002
- FIFA Football 2002
- FIFA Football 2003
- FIFA Football 2004
- FIFA Football 2005
- FIFA 06
- 2006 FIFA World Cup
- FIFA Street
- FIFA Street 2
- Intellivision Lives!
- International Superstar Soccer 2
- International Superstar Soccer 3
- Jikkyō World Soccer 2002
- RedCard 20-03
- Sega Soccer Slam
- Super Mario Strikers
- UEFA Champions League 2004-2005
- Urban Freestyle Soccer
- Virtua Striker 3 ver.2002
- Winning Eleven 6

==== Wii ====
- 2010 FIFA World Cup South Africa
- Academy of Champions: Soccer
- Canimals Ultimate Football
- Fantastic Football Fan Party
- FIFA 08
- FIFA 09
- FIFA 10
- FIFA 11
- FIFA 12
- FIFA 13
- FIFA 14
- FIFA 15
- Happy Tree Friends Super Soccer
- Inazuma Eleven GO Strikers 2013
- Inazuma Eleven Strikers
- Inazuma Eleven Strikers 2012 Xtreme
- Kidz Sports International Soccer
- Mario Strikers Charged
- Pro Evolution Soccer 2008
- Pro Evolution Soccer 2009
- Pro Evolution Soccer 2010
- Pro Evolution Soccer 2011
- Pro Evolution Soccer 2012
- Pro Evolution Soccer 2013
- Real Madrid: The Game
- Street Football 2
- Tamagotchi Football Cup

==== Wii U ====
- FIFA 13

==== Nintendo Switch ====
- Captain Tsubasa: Rise of New Champions
- Despelote
- Desktop Soccer
- Desktop Soccer 2
- EA Sports FC 24
- EA Sports FC 25
- EA Sports FC 26
- EA Sports FC 27
- FIFA 18
- FIFA 19
- FIFA 20
- FIFA 21
- FIFA 22
- FIFA 23
- Football Heroes League
- Football Manager 2018
- Football Manager 2019
- Football Manager 2020
- Football Manager 2021
- Football Manager 2022
- Football, Tactics & Glory
- Inazuma Eleven: Victory Road
- Legendary Eleven
- Mario Strikers: Battle League
- Nintendo Switch Sports
- Retro Goal
- Soccer on Desk
- Sociable Soccer 24
- Sociable Soccer 25
- Street Power Football

==== Nintendo Switch 2 ====
- EA Sports FC 26
- EA Sports FC 27

=== Sony ===
==== PlayStation ====
- 2002 FIFA World Cup
- 4-4-2 Soccer
- Actua Soccer
- Actua Soccer 2
- Actua Soccer 3
- Actua Soccer Club Edition
- Adidas Power Soccer
- Adidas Power Soccer 2
- Adidas Power Soccer International 97
- Adidas Power Soccer 98
- Alex Ferguson's Player Manager 2001
- Alex Ferguson's Player Manager 2002
- All Star Soccer
- Backyard Soccer
- Championship Manager Quiz
- Chris Kamara's Street Soccer
- Combination Pro Soccer
- Complete Onside Soccer
- David Beckham Soccer
- Dynamite Soccer 98
- Dynamite Soccer 2000
- Dynamite Soccer 2002
- Dynamite Soccer 2004 Final
- ESPN MLS GameNight
- European Super League
- FA Manager
- FA Premier League Football Manager 2000
- FA Premier League Football Manager 2001
- FA Premier League Stars
- FA Premier League Stars 2001
- FIFA 96
- FIFA 97
- FIFA Road to World Cup 98
- FIFA 99
- FIFA 2000
- FIFA 2001
- FIFA Football 2002
- FIFA Football 2003
- FIFA Football 2004
- FIFA Football 2005
- Football Madness
- Formation Soccer '97: The Road To France
- Formation Soccer '98: Ganbare Nippon in France
- Fox Sports Soccer '99
- Goal Storm
- Hyper Formation Soccer
- International Soccer Excite Stage 2000
- International Superstar Soccer Deluxe
- International Superstar Soccer Pro
- International Superstar Soccer '98
- ISS Pro Evolution
- ISS Pro Evolution 2
- J.League Virtual Stadium '96
- J.League Jikkyou Winning Eleven
- J.League Jikkyou Winning Eleven '97
- J.League Jikkyou Winning Eleven 3
- J.League Jikkyou Winning Eleven 2000
- J.League Jikkyou Winning Eleven 2000 2nd
- J.League Jikkyō Winning Eleven 2001
- J.League Soccer: Jikkyou Survival League
- J.League Jikkyou Winning Eleven 2000 2nd
- J.League Winning Eleven '98-'99
- Kick Off World
- LiberoGrande
- Liberogrande International
- LMA Manager
- LMA Manager 2001
- LMA Manager 2002
- Marcel Desailly Pro Soccer
- Namco Soccer Prime Goal
- Olympic Soccer
- Onside Soccer
- Player Manager
- Player Manager Ninety Nine
- Player Manager 2000
- Premier Manager 98
- Premier Manager 99
- Premier Manager 2000
- Pro Evolution Soccer
- Pro Evolution Soccer 2
- Pro: Foot Contest 98
- Puma Street Soccer
- Ronaldo V-Football
- Sensible Soccer
- Sky Sports Football Quiz
- Sky Sports Football Quiz Season 02
- Soccer '97
- Soccer Kid
- Striker 96
- Super Football Champ
- Super Match Soccer
- Super Shot Soccer
- Sven-Goran Eriksson's World Cup Challenge
- Sven-Goran Eriksson's World Cup Manager
- The Mission
- This Is Football
- This Is Football 2
- Three Lions
- UEFA Challenge
- UEFA Champions League 98/99
- UEFA Champions League 99/00
- UEFA Champions League 00/01
- UEFA Euro 2000
- UEFA Striker
- Viva Football
- World Cup 98
- World League Soccer 98
- World League Soccer 99 (Michael Owen)
- World Soccer Jikkyo Winning Eleven 4
- World Soccer Winning Eleven 2002
- XS Junior League Soccer

==== PlayStation 2 ====
- Alex Ferguson's Player Manager 2001
- Championship Manager 5
- Championship Manager 2006
- Championship Manager 2007
- City Soccer Challenge
- Club Football 2003/2004 Season
- Club Football 2005
- David Beckham Soccer
- England International Football
- ESPN MLS ExtraTime 2002
- FIFA 2001
- FIFA Football 2002
- FIFA Football 2003
- FIFA Football 2004
- FIFA Football 2005
- FIFA 06
- FIFA 07
- FIFA 08
- FIFA 09
- FIFA 10
- FIFA 11
- FIFA 12
- FIFA 13
- FIFA 14: Legacy Edition
- FIFA Soccer World Championship
- FIFA Street
- FIFA Street 2
- FIFA Total Football
- FIFA Total Football 2
- FIFA World Cup: Germany 2006
- Football Generation
- Football Mania
- Football Kingdom: Trial Edition
- Formation Final
- The Great British Football Quiz
- International Superstar Soccer
- International Superstar Soccer 2
- International Superstar Soccer 3
- J.League Pro Soccer Club o Tsukurou! '04
- J.League Pro Soccer Club o Tsukurou! 3
- J.League Pro Soccer Club o Tsukurou! 5
- J.League Pro Soccer Club o Tsukurou! 5
- J.League Tactics Manager
- J.League Winning Eleven 10 + Europa League 06-07
- J.League Winning Eleven 2007 Club Championship
- J.League Winning Eleven 2008 Club Championship
- J.League Winning Eleven 2009 Club Championship
- J.League Winning Eleven 2010 Club Championship
- J.League Winning Eleven 5
- J.League Winning Eleven 6
- J.League Winning Eleven 8: Asia Championship
- J.League Winning Eleven 9: Asia Championship
- J.League Winning Eleven Tactics
- Let's Make A Soccer Team!
- LMA Manager 2002
- LMA Manager 2003
- LMA Manager 2004
- LMA Manager 2005
- LMA Manager 2006
- LMA Manager 2007
- Manchester United Manager 2005
- Marcel Desailly Pro Soccer
- Premier Manager 2002/2003 Season
- Premier Manager 2003–04
- Premier Manager 2004–2005
- Premier Manager 2005–2006
- Premier Manager 2006–2007
- Premier Manager 08
- Premier Manager 09
- Pro Evolution Soccer
- Pro Evolution Soccer 2
- Pro Evolution Soccer 3
- Pro Evolution Soccer 4
- Pro Evolution Soccer 5
- Pro Evolution Soccer 6
- Pro Evolution Soccer 2008
- Pro Evolution Soccer 2009
- Pro Evolution Soccer 2010
- Pro Evolution Soccer 2011
- Pro Evolution Soccer 2012
- Pro Evolution Soccer 2013
- Pro Evolution Soccer 2014
- Pro Evolution Soccer Management
- Real Madrid: The Game
- RedCard 20-03
- Sega Soccer Slam
- Sensible Soccer 2006
- Soccer America: International Cup
- Soccer Life!
- Soccer Life 2
- Sven-Goran Eriksson's World Cup Challenge
- Sven-Goran Eriksson's World Cup Manager
- This is Football 2002
- This is Football 2003
- This is Football 2004
- This is Football 2005
- Total Club Manager 2004
- Total Club Manager 2005
- UEFA Challenge
- UEFA Champions League 2004–2005
- UEFA Champions League 2006–2007
- UEFA Champions League Season 2001/2002
- UEFA Euro 2004
- UEFA Euro 2008
- Ultimate Beach Soccer
- The Ultimate World Cup Quiz
- Urban Freestyle Soccer
- Virtua Pro Football

==== PlayStation 3 ====
- 2010 FIFA World Cup South Africa
- 2014 FIFA World Cup Brazil
- FIFA 08
- FIFA 09
- FIFA 10
- FIFA 11
- FIFA 12
- FIFA 13
- FIFA 14
- FIFA 15
- FIFA 16
- FIFA 17
- FIFA 18
- FIFA 19
- FIFA Street 3
- FIFA Street 4
- Premier Manager
- Premier Manager 2012
- Pro Evolution Soccer 2008
- Pro Evolution Soccer 2009
- Pro Evolution Soccer 2010
- Pro Evolution Soccer 2011
- Pro Evolution Soccer 2012
- Pro Evolution Soccer 2013
- Pro Evolution Soccer 2014
- Pro Evolution Soccer 2015
- Pro Evolution Soccer 2016
- Pro Evolution Soccer 2017
- Pro Evolution Soccer 2018
- Pure Football
- UEFA Euro 2008

==== PlayStation Portable ====
- 2006 FIFA World Cup Germany
- 2010 FIFA World Cup South Africa
- Championship Manager 2007
- Championship Manager PSP
- FIFA Football 2005
- FIFA 06
- FIFA 07
- FIFA 08
- FIFA 09
- FIFA 10
- FIFA 11
- FIFA 12
- FIFA 13
- FIFA 14
- Football Manager 2006
- Real Madrid: The Game
- Pro Evolution Soccer 5
- Pro Evolution Soccer 6
- Pro Evolution Soccer 2008
- Pro Evolution Soccer 2009
- Pro Evolution Soccer 2010
- Pro Evolution Soccer 2011
- Pro Evolution Soccer 2012
- Pro Evolution Soccer 2013
- Pro Evolution Soccer 2014
- UEFA Champions League 2006–2007
- UEFA Euro 2008
- World Tour Soccer
- World Tour Soccer 2

==== PlayStation Vita ====
- Active Soccer 2 DX
- Dino Dini's Kick Off Revival
- FIFA 12
- FIFA 13
- FIFA 14
- FIFA 15
- Football Manager 2014
- Pro Evolution Soccer 2013

==== PlayStation 4 ====
- 16-bit Soccer
- Active Soccer 2 DX
- Captain Tsubasa: Rise of New Champions
- EA Sports FC 24
- EA Sports FC 25
- EA Sports FC 26
- EA Sports FC 27
- eFootball PES 2020
- eFootball
- Dino Dini's Kick Off Revival
- FIFA 14
- FIFA 15
- FIFA 16
- FIFA 17
- FIFA 18
- FIFA 19
- FIFA 20
- FIFA 21
- FIFA 22
- FIFA 23
- Football, Tactics & Glory
- Inazuma Eleven: Victory Road
- Legendary Eleven
- Pro Evolution Soccer 2015
- Pro Evolution Soccer 2016
- Pro Evolution Soccer 2017
- Pro Evolution Soccer 2018
- Pro Evolution Soccer 2019
- Sociable Soccer 25
- Street Power Football

==== PlayStation 5 ====
- Copa City
- Despelote
- EA Sports FC 24
- EA Sports FC 25
- EA Sports FC 26
- EA Sports FC 27
- eFootball
- FIFA 22
- FIFA 23
- Football Heroes League
- Futbol Break
- Futbol Break Head to Head
- Futbol Kicks
- Goals
- Rematch
- Sociable Soccer 25
- UFL

=== Sega ===
==== 32X ====
- FIFA Soccer 96

==== Game Gear ====
- FIFA International Soccer
- FIFA Soccer 96
- J.League GG Pro Striker '94
- J.League Soccer: Dream Eleven
- Sensible Soccer
- Tengen World Cup Soccer
- Ultimate Soccer
- World Cup USA '94

==== Master System ====
- Champions of Europe
- FIFA International Soccer
- Great Soccer
- Sensible Soccer: European Champions
- Super Kick-Off
- Tecmo World Cup '93
- Ultimate Soccer
- World Cup Italia '90
- World Cup USA '94
- World Soccer

==== Mega-CD ====
- FIFA International Soccer
- World Cup USA '94

==== Mega Drive/Genesis ====
- Champions World Class Soccer
- Dino Dini's Soccer
- European Club Soccer
- Fever Pitch Soccer
- FIFA International Soccer
- FIFA Soccer 95
- FIFA Soccer 96
- FIFA 97
- FIFA: Road to World Cup 98
- International Sensible Soccer Limited Edition: World Champions
- International Superstar Soccer Deluxe
- J-League Champion Soccer
- J-League Pro Striker '93
- J-League Pro Striker 2
- J-League Pro Striker Kanzenban
- Kick Off 3
- Pelé!
- Pelé II: World Tournament Soccer
- Premier Manager
- Premier Manager 97
- Pro Moves Soccer
- Sensible Soccer
- Sensible Soccer: International Edition
- Striker
- Super Kick-Off
- Tecmo World Cup
- Total Football
- Ultimate Soccer
- World Championship Soccer
- World Championship Soccer 2
- World Cup Italia '90
- World Cup USA '94
- World Trophy Soccer
- Genesis 6-pack

==== Saturn ====
- Actua Soccer Club Edition
- FIFA: Road to World Cup 98
- FIFA Soccer 96
- FIFA 97
- Hattrick Hero S
- Isto é Zico: Jiko no Kangaeru Soccer (interactive movie)
- J.League Go Go Goal!
- J. League Jikkyou Honoo no Striker
- J. League Victory Goal '97
- J. League Pro Soccer Club o Tsukurou!
- J. League Pro Soccer Club o Tsukurou! 2
- Nippon Daihyou Team no Kantoku ni Narou! Sekaihatsu Soccer RPG
- Okudera Yasuhiko no Sekai wo Mezase! Soccer Kids: Nyuumon Hen
- Olympic Soccer
- Sega Worldwide Soccer 97
- Sega Worldwide Soccer 98
- Striker 96
- UEFA Euro 96 England
- Victory Goal
- Victory Goal '96
- VR Soccer
- World Evolution Soccer
- World League Soccer 98
- Worldwide Soccer: Sega International Victory Goal Edition

==== Dreamcast ====
- 90 Minutes: Sega Championship Football
- European Super League
- Giant Killers
- J-League Pro-Club Soccer 2
- Let's Make a J-League Professional Soccer Club
- Sega Worldwide Soccer 2000 Euro Edition
- Sega Worldwide Soccer 2000
- Soccer Tsuku Tokudai Gou J.League Pro Soccer Club o Tsukurou!
- Soccer Tsuku Tokudai Gou 2: J.League Pro Soccer Club o Tsukurou!
- UEFA Dream Soccer
- UEFA Striker
- Virtua Striker 2 version 2000.1

=== Microsoft ===
==== Xbox ====
- 2002 FIFA World Cup
- 2006 FIFA World Cup
- Championship Manager: Season 01/02
- Championship Manager: Season 02/03
- Championship Manager 5
- Championship Manager 2006
- Club Football 2003/2004 Season
- Club Football 2005
- David Beckham Soccer
- England International Football
- ESPN MLS ExtraTime 2002
- FIFA Football 2003
- FIFA Football 2004
- FIFA Football 2005
- FIFA 2003
- FIFA 2004
- FIFA 06
- FIFA 07
- FIFA Street
- FIFA Street 2
- FIFA World Cup: Germany 2006
- International Superstar Soccer 2
- LMA Manager 2003
- LMA Manager 2004
- LMA Manager 2005
- LMA Manager 2006
- Manchester United Manager 2005
- Pro Evolution Soccer 4
- Pro Evolution Soccer 5
- RedCard 20-03
- Sega Soccer Slam
- Sensible Soccer 2006
- Total Club Manager 2004
- Total Club Manager 2005
- UEFA Champions League 2004–2005
- UEFA Euro 2004
- Ultimate Beach Soccer
- Urban Freestyle Soccer

==== Xbox 360 ====
- 2006 FIFA World Cup
- 2010 FIFA World Cup South Africa
- 2014 FIFA World Cup Brazil
- Adidas miCoach
- Championship Manager 2007
- FIFA 06
- FIFA 06: Road to FIFA World Cup
- FIFA 07
- FIFA 08
- FIFA 09
- FIFA 10
- FIFA 11
- FIFA 12
- FIFA 13
- FIFA 14
- FIFA 15
- FIFA 16
- FIFA 17
- FIFA 18
- FIFA 19
- FIFA Street
- FIFA Street 3
- Football Manager 2006
- Football Manager 2007
- Football Manager 2008
- LMA Manager 2007
- Pro Evolution Soccer 5
- Pro Evolution Soccer 6
- Pro Evolution Soccer 2008
- Pro Evolution Soccer 2009
- Pro Evolution Soccer 2010
- Pro Evolution Soccer 2011
- Pro Evolution Soccer 2012
- Pro Evolution Soccer 2013
- Pro Evolution Soccer 2014
- Pro Evolution Soccer 2015
- Pro Evolution Soccer 2016
- Pro Evolution Soccer 2017
- Pro Evolution Soccer 2018
- Pure Football
- Sega Soccer Slam
- Sensible World of Soccer
- UEFA Champions League 2006–2007
- UEFA Euro 2008

==== Xbox One ====
- EA Sports FC 24
- EA Sports FC 25
- EA Sports FC 26
- EA Sports FC 27
- eFootball PES 2020
- eFootball
- FIFA 14
- FIFA 15
- FIFA 16
- FIFA 17
- FIFA 18
- FIFA 19
- FIFA 20
- FIFA 21
- FIFA 22
- FIFA 23
- Football Manager 2021
- Football Manager 2022
- Football Manager 2023
- Football Manager 2024
- Football, Tactics & Glory
- Legendary Eleven
- Pro Evolution Soccer 2015
- Pro Evolution Soccer 2016
- Pro Evolution Soccer 2017
- Pro Evolution Soccer 2018
- Pro Evolution Soccer 2019
- Sociable Soccer 25

==== Xbox Series X and Series S ====
- Copa City
- Despelote
- EA Sports FC 24
- EA Sports FC 25
- EA Sports FC 26
- EA Sports FC 27
- eFootball
- FIFA 21
- FIFA 22
- FIFA 23
- Football Heroes League
- Football Manager 2022
- Football Manager 2023
- Football Manager 2024
- Football Manager 26
- Goals
- Rematch
- Sociable Soccer 25
- UFL

== Computers ==
=== 8-bit home computers ===
==== Atari 8-bit computers ====
- Brian Clough's Football Fortunes
- European Super Soccer
- Fantastic Soccer
- Football Manager
- Footballer of the Year
- Kenny Dalglish Soccer Manager
- Kick Off
- League Challenge
- Liga Polska
- Piłkarski Poker
- Soccer (1982, Gamma Software)
- Soccer (1982, Thorn EMI)
- World Cup Manager
- World Soccer

==== Commodore 64 ====
- 1st Division Manager
- 4 Soccer Simulators
- International Soccer
- Kenny Dalglish Soccer Match
- Peter Shilton's Handball Maradona
- Emlyn Hughes International Soccer
- MicroProse Soccer
- World Cup Carnival
- World Cup Soccer: Italia '90

==== ZX Spectrum ====
- 11-a-Side Soccer
- 1st Division Manager
- 2 Player Soccer Squad
- 4 Soccer Simulators
- Adidas Championship Football
- Advanced Soccer Simulator
- Big Match Soccer
- Bobby Charlton's Soccer
- Boss, The
- Brian Clough's Football Fortunes
- British Super League
- Bryan Robson's Super League
- Champions
- Championship Soccer
- Cup Football
- The Double
- Dundee's European Challenge
- Emlyn Hughes International Soccer
- European 5-a-Side
- European Soccer Challenge
- European Superleague
- F.A. Cup Football
- Fighting Soccer
- Five A Side Soccer
- Football Champions
- Football Club
- Football Director
- Football Director 2: Player Super League
- Football Director II
- Footballer of the Year
- Footballer of the Year 2
- Footballer, The
- Football Fever
- Football Glory
- Football Manager
- Football Manager World Cup Edition
- Football Manager 2
- Football Manager 3
- Gary Lineker's Superstar Soccer
- Gazza's Superstar Soccer
- Graeme Souness Soccer Manager
- Indoor Soccer
- International Match Day
- Italia '90 - World Cup Soccer
- Jimmy's Soccer Manager
- Kenny Dalglish Soccer Manager
- Kenny Dalglish Soccer Match
- League Challenge
- Match Day
- Match Day II
- MicroProse Soccer
- Multi-Player Soccer Manager
- Peter Beardsley's International Football
- Peter Shilton's Handball Maradona
- Professional Footballer
- Professional Soccer
- Soccer Boss
- Soccer Club Boss
- Soccer Director
- Soccer Mania
- Soccer Rematch
- Soccer Rivals
- Soccer Spectacular
- Soccer Squad, The
- Soccer Star
- Soccer Stars
- Soccer Supremo
- Sociable Soccer 25
- Star Soccer
- Superleague Soccer
- Super Soccer
- World Championship Soccer
- World Cup Football
- World Cup Soccer
- World of Soccer
- World Soccer
- World Soccer League
- Your Team
- Treble Champions
- ZX Football Manager 2005

==== Amstrad CPC ====
- Peter Shilton's Handball Maradona

=== 16-bit home computers ===
==== Amiga ====
- 1st Division Manager
- 3D World Soccer
- Brian Clough's Football Fortunes
- Championship Manager
- Championship Manager 93/94
- Championship Manager Italia
- David Oakley Soccer
- Euro Soccer '88
- Euro Soccer '92
- European Championship 1992
- European Football Champ
- European Soccer Challenge
- Emlyn Hughes International Soccer
- Empire Soccer
- FIFA International Soccer
- Football Champ
- Football Director II
- Football Director II v2
- Football Glory
- Football Glory Indoors
- Football Manager
- Football Manager 2
- Football Manager World Cup Edition
- Football Masters
- Footballer of the Year
- Footballer of the Year 2
- Gary Lineker's Hot-Shot!
- Gazza Soccer 2
- Gazza's Superstar Soccer
- Goal!
- Graeme Souness Soccer Manager
- Graeme Souness Vektor Soccer
- Graham Taylor's Soccer Challenge
- International Soccer (1988)
- International Soccer (1994)
- International Soccer Challenge
- Italia 1990
- Italy '90 Soccer
- John Barnes European Football
- Kenny Dalglish Soccer Match
- Kick Off
- Kick Off 2
- Liverpool
- Lothar Matthäus Soccer
- The Manager
- Manchester United
- Manchester United Europe
- MicroProse Soccer
- On the Ball
- Percy E. Nash's International Soccer
- Peter Beardsley's International Football
- Player Manager
- Player Manager 2
- Premier Manager
- Premier Manager 2
- Premier Manager 3
- Sensible Soccer
- Sensible Soccer v1.1
- Sensible World of Soccer
- Sierra Soccer
- Striker
- Total Football
- Ultimate Soccer Manager
- Wembley International Soccer
- Wild Cup Soccer
- World Championship Soccer
- World Cup Soccer: Italia '90
- World Cup USA '94
- World Soccer

==== Atari ST ====
- Emlyn Hughes International Soccer
- 1st Division Manager
- Anders Limpar's Proffs Fotboll
- Bundesliga Manager
- Championship Manager
- Euro Soccer '88
- International Soccer
- Kick Off
- Microprose Soccer
- Sensible Soccer
- Soccer Manager Plus
- Striker

=== IBM PC compatibles ===
- Championship Manager
  - Championship Manager:
    - Championship Manager 93/94
    - Championship Manager Italia
  - Championship Manager 2
    - Championship Manager 96/97
    - Championship Manager 97/98
  - Championship Manager 3
    - Championship Manager: Season 99/00
    - Championship Manager: Season 00/01
    - Championship Manager: Season 01/02
  - Championship Manager 4
    - Championship Manager: Season 03/04
  - Championship Manager 5
    - Championship Manager Online
    - Championship Manager 2006
    - Championship Manager 2007
    - Championship Manager 2008
    - Championship Manager 2010
    - Championship Manager World Challenge
    - Championship Manager 2011
    - Championship Manager: World of Football
- FIFA
  - FIFA International Soccer
  - FIFA Soccer 96
  - FIFA 97
  - FIFA: Road to World Cup 98
  - World Cup 98
  - FIFA 99
  - FIFA 2000
  - FIFA 2001
  - FIFA Football 2002
  - 2002 FIFA World Cup
  - FIFA Football 2003
  - FIFA Football 2004
  - FIFA Football 2005
  - FIFA 06
  - 2006 FIFA World Cup
  - FIFA 07
  - FIFA 08
  - FIFA 09
  - FIFA 10
  - FIFA 11
  - FIFA 12
    - UEFA Euro 2012 (DLC)
  - FIFA 13
  - FIFA 14
  - 2014 FIFA World Cup
  - FIFA 15
  - FIFA 16
  - FIFA 17
  - FIFA 18
  - FIFA 19
  - FIFA 20
  - FIFA 21
  - FIFA 22
  - FIFA 23
- EA Sports FC
  - EA Sports FC 24
  - EA Sports FC 25
  - EA Sports FC 26
  - EA Sports FC 27
- UEFA European Championship
  - UEFA Euro 2000
  - UEFA Euro 2004
  - UEFA Euro 2008
  - UEFA Euro 2012
- FIFA Manager
  - FIFA Manager 06
  - FIFA Manager 07
  - FIFA Manager 08
  - FIFA Manager 09
  - FIFA Manager 10
  - FIFA Manager 11
  - FIFA Manager 12
  - FIFA Manager 13
  - FIFA Manager 14
  - FIFA Manager 15
- Football Manager
  - Football Manager 2005
  - Football Manager 2006
  - Football Manager 2007
  - Football Manager 2008
  - Football Manager 2009
  - Football Manager 2010
  - Football Manager 2011
  - Football Manager 2012
  - Football Manager 2013
  - Football Manager 2014
  - Football Manager 2015
  - Football Manager 2016
  - Football Manager 2017
  - Football Manager 2018
  - Football Manager 2019
  - Football Manager 2020
  - Football Manager 2021
  - Football Manager 2022
  - Football Manager 2023
- Global Soccer Manager
  - Global Soccer Manager 2017
  - Global Soccer Manager 2018
  - Global Soccer Manager 2019
- Premier Manager
  - Premier Manager 98
  - Premier Manager: Ninety Nine
  - Premier Manager 2000
  - Premier Manager 2002/2003 Season
  - Premier Manager 2003–04
  - Premier Manager 2004–2005
  - Premier Manager 2005–2006
  - Premier Manager 2006–2007
  - Premier Manager 08
  - Premier Manager 09
  - Premier Manager 10
  - Premier Manager
  - Premier Manager 2012
- Pro Evolution Soccer
  - Pro Evolution Soccer 3
  - Pro Evolution Soccer 4
  - Pro Evolution Soccer 5
  - Pro Evolution Soccer 6
  - Pro Evolution Soccer 2008
  - Pro Evolution Soccer 2009
  - Pro Evolution Soccer 2010
  - Pro Evolution Soccer 2011
  - Pro Evolution Soccer 2012
  - Pro Evolution Soccer 2013
  - Pro Evolution Soccer 2014
  - Pro Evolution Soccer 2015
  - Pro Evolution Soccer 2016
  - Pro Evolution Soccer 2017
  - Pro Evolution Soccer 2018
  - Pro Evolution Soccer 2019
  - eFootball PES 2020
- eFootball
- The F.A. Premier League Football Manager
  - The F.A. Premier League Football Manager 99
  - The F.A. Premier League Football Manager 2000
  - The F.A. Premier League Football Manager 2001
  - The F.A. Premier League Football Manager 2002
- Total Club Manager
  - Total Club Manager 2003
  - Total Club Manager 2004
  - Total Club Manager 2005
- 1-0 Soccer Manager
- Action Soccer
- Actua Soccer
- Bang Average Football
- Copa City
- Complete Onside Soccer
- Despelote
- European Championship 1992
- European Superleague
- FIFA Online 2
- FIFA Soccer Manager
- Finger Football
- Football Heroes League
- Football Story
- Gazza II
- Goal 94
- iSoccer
- I Am Playr
- International Soccer
- International Superstar Soccer 3
- Kick Off 2002
- Kiko World Football
- Liverpool (video game)
- LMA Manager 2007
- Manager, The
- Manchester United (video game series)
- Mundial de Fútbol
- One-Nil
- One-Nil '95
- One-Nil '96
- PC Fútbol
- Rematch
- Sensible Soccer 2006
- Sensible World of Soccer
- Soccer Wizard
- Super Match Soccer
- The Soccer Game
- The Soccer Game 2
- UEFA Champions League 2006–2007
- UFL
- Urban Freestyle Soccer

=== Macintosh ===
- Football Manager
  - Football Manager 2021
  - Football Manager 2022

== Android and iOS ==
=== Google Play ===
- Champion Of The Fields
- Dream League Soccer
- FIFA
- FIFA Mobile
- Fluid Football
- Football Manager
- Football Master
- Mini Football
- Pro Evolution Soccer
- Real Football
- Sociable Soccer
- Sociable Soccer 2020
- Soccer Soccer '21
- Soccer Manager 2024
- Stickman Soccer
- Total Football
- Ultimate Football Club
- Vive Le Football
- World Soccer Champs
- Football League

== Marketing and franchises ==
The biggest association football video game franchise is EA Sports FC (formerly FIFA) by Electronic Arts (EA). Its major competitor is Konami's eFootball (formerly Pro Evolution Soccer or Winning Eleven). FIFA is also the most successful sports video game franchise overall.

=== Franchises ===
- Adidas Power Soccer
- Captain Tsubasa
- Championship Manager
- FIFA (1993–2022)
- EA Sports FC
- Football Manager (2000s–2010s)
- Football Manager (1980s–1990s)
- Kick Off
- Inazuma Eleven
- International Superstar Soccer
- Manchester United
- Mario Strikers
- Match Day
- On the Ball
- Pro Evolution Soccer (Winning Eleven); currently known as eFootball
- Sega Worldwide Soccer
- Sensible Soccer
- Super Sidekicks
- Tecmo Cup
- UEFA European Championship
- Virtua Striker

== See also ==
- List of association football films
