= International football =

International football or international soccer may refer to:

- International competitions in association football
- International competitions in women's association football
- International Federation of American Football (IFAF)
- International rules football, a blend of Gaelic football and Australian rules football
- NASL Soccer, a 1980 video game that released for the Atari 2600 as International Soccer
- International Soccer, a 1983 video game
- International Soccer (1988 video game)

== See also ==
- Non-FIFA international football
- List of men's national association football teams
- List of women's national association football teams
