= World Trophy Soccer =

World Trophy Soccer is the name given to two distinct video games:

- World Trophy Soccer, a 1989 game by Virgin Mastertronic later reworked as World Cup Soccer: Italia '90
- World Trophy Soccer, a 1992 game for the Sega Genesis, a reworking of European Club Soccer
