= Captain Tsubasa (Mega-CD video game) =

1994 video game

- Developer: Tecmo
- Publisher: Tecmo
- Series: Captain Tsubasa
- Platform: Sega Mega-CD
- Release: JP: September 30, 1994
- Genre: Soccer
- Modes: Single-player, multiplayer

Captain Tsubasa (キャプテン翼) is a 1994 video game released by Tecmo for the Sega Mega-CD and based on the popular Captain Tsubasa manga/anime series. It was published only in Japan.

== Summary ==
The game is a further extension of Tecmo's "Cinematic Soccer" genre of games that appeared previously in other platforms, with the player watching from a cinematic angle and having to choose their actions from a timed list, with the results of these actions being animated on screen. It is also notable for being the first CD-ROM based Captain Tsubasa video game, featuring improved spoken cutscenes with the purpose of retelling the original Captain Tsubasa story more closely to watching the anime. This is part of Tecmo's game series, but whether its story takes place before the events of Captain Tsubasa VS is unknown.

== See also ==
- Tecmo Cup Soccer Game
- Tecmo Cup Football Game
