= Total Football (disambiguation) =

Total Football is a tactical theory of soccer play. This may also refer to:

- Total Football (magazine), a British soccer magazine from 1995–2001
- Total Football (video game), a soccer video game published in 1995
- The former name of Fox Sports FC, an Australian soccer TV show
- Total Football, a 2018 song by Parquet Courts from the album Wide Awake!
