= European Super League (video game) =

2001 football video game

- Developers: Crimson; Coyote Developments
- Publisher: Virgin Interactive Entertainment
- Platforms: Dreamcast, PlayStation, Microsoft Windows
- Release: EU: 2001
- Genre: Sports
- Modes: Single-player, multiplayer

European Super League is a football video game developed by Crimson and Coyote Developments and published by Virgin Interactive Entertainment for the Dreamcast, PlayStation and Microsoft Windows in 2001.

== Gameplay ==
Players can select from 16 licensed European sides including AC Milan, Ajax, Bayern Munich, Leverkusen, Barcelona, Juventus, Borussia Dortmund, Chelsea, IFK Göteborg, Inter Milan, Marseille, Liverpool, Olympiacos, Paris Saint-Germain, Benfica and Real Madrid, with real player names and likenesses, as well as accurate stadia and kits. Two control methods are provided, a basic control method using a limited set of buttons, alongside a more advanced control method which gives players "more freedom and control". Game modes include friendly matches, training, custom tournaments and leagues and the main European Super League mode (loosely based on the UEFA Champions League).

== Development ==
The game was developed using a modified version of the engine used for Viva Football, a 1998 title also developed by Crimson and published by Virgin Interactive. Producer David Casey told Official Dreamcast Magazine that their aim was to "make ESL more accessible [than Viva Football] by slowing the game down and making the controls easier to use".

The 16 sides were chosen, according to producer David Casey to provide "the best teams from the major territories - England, Spain, France, Germany, Italy - and then selected one well-known team from the other countries to make up the 16". The developers were limited to two Premier League sides due to a pre-existing contract the league had with Electronic Arts, the developers of the FIFA series. Manchester United were cited as among the available teams in previews, but were replaced by Chelsea in the released game.

The developers also claimed to have recorded real audio at each of the 16 stadia included in the game to lend a sense of realism to gameplay and differentiation between stadia.

== Reception ==
Official Dreamcast Magazine awarded the title 70/100, with reviewer Steve Hill stating that it was "as good as any [Dreamcast football title] currently available" and that "what it lacks in finesse, it makes up for in atmosphere and authenticity". Writing in Dreamcast Magazine Martin Mathers gave the game 58/100, commenting that "The visuals, while adequate, aren't exactly mind-blowing and the whole experience seems a bit too sluggish for our liking". Greg Howson of The Guardian gave the game 3/5 stars, arguing that players may "marvel at Zidane's accurately modelled bald patch and the admittedly impressive stadia but groan as the match kicks off". Spanish magazine DreamPlanet was considerably more critical, awarding the Dreamcast version 49%. Although the reviewer acknowledged the game's licensing of major European clubs, they criticised its graphics, animations and overall presentation, regarding it as one of the weaker football games available for the console.
