= Tecmo Cup Football Game =

- Title screen
- Developers: Tecmo; Sega
- Publisher: Sega
- Engine: Captain Tsubasa
- Platform: Sega Mega Drive
- Release: EU: Cancelled
- Genre: Sports game simulation
- Modes: Single-player, multiplayer

Tecmo Cup Football Game is a cancelled 1993 association football sports video game. While the game was about to be published by Sega with license from Tecmo for the Sega Mega Drive, it was cancelled due to the release department of Sega Europe's policy regarding third party games (along with many other games, most of them that already had a Japanese release, like Splatterhouse 3 or Golden Axe III). The game would have enjoyed a Europe-exclusive release because the game was heavily promoted on many magazines and promo videos at the time. 'SuperJuegos' magazine from Spain even had a VHS promotion video including footage of the game and promoting its further release. There is a ROM of this game available on the Internet despite not having been released in cartridge form.

The game greatly resembles the Captain Tsubasa series and games in appearance of characters and gameplay. A similar game was released a year before for the Nintendo Entertainment System under the title Tecmo Cup Soccer Game, which was also released in Europe as Tecmo Cup Football Game. Tecmo later released Captain Tsubasa for Mega-CD in Japan in 1994 which was nearly identical to this game.

== Features ==
Unlike other soccer simulators, Tecmo Cup Football Game plays more like a role-playing video game. The player runs around the field normally, but when he comes into contact with an opposing team member, a turn-based 'battle' is initiated. The player then has the option to perform a variety of moves such as dribbling, tackling and shooting, in addition to player-specific moves, some of which are physics-defying and destructive.

== Story ==
Robert, the game's protagonist, holding the World Cup

The game follows a young boy named Robert with a passion for soccer and a dream of winning the World Cup. To achieve his ambition, he joins the Dreams F.C. with his brother David and soon becomes captain and star player of the team. Robert must defeat all opposing teams in the national tournament. Shortly after the victory, Robert is contacted by an agent called Sylvia, who offers Robert the position of captain in the new all-star team called the Ours. The Ours play a few matches against other clubs, and soon compete in the preliminary league. If the team qualifies, they get to compete in the Tecmo Cup.

With this game, Tecmo tried to preserve the rivalry between characters in the original Captain Tsubasa series.

=== Characters ===
There are 30 playable characters, many of which are remodeled versions of one another, with minor variation in such things as hair and eye colours and hair lengths. Only the more important characters in the game are given a unique appearance. These characters include Robert, David, and Alfred.

Player	Team (position)	Biography
Robert	Dreams (MF)	The game's protagonist. As a child, he played soccer with his brother David, and soon becomes captain of Dreams F.C. and the Ours.
David	Dreams (CF); Sharks (CF)	Robert's older brother, he is constantly doubtful of his abilities and leaves Dreams F.C., only to return at a later point in the game.
Alfred	Ham (CF); Germany (CF)	Extremely skilled player, and is captain of both Hamburg F.C., and the Germany national team. Alfred is Robert's primary rival.

== Gameplay ==
Tecmo Cup Football Game is a radical departure from traditional soccer simulators; the game resembles an RPG more than anything. The player runs around the field normally, navigating by means of a miniature overhead view of the field located at the bottom of the screen, on which they are represented by the number they occupy on the team. The player in possession of the ball is seen as a tiny football.

Screenshot of gameplay showing the navigation map on the bottom

As soon as the player comes into contact with an opponent a menu screen is shown, in which the player decides what to do next. Options differ depending on if the player is in possession of the ball or not. If in possession of the ball, the player has the option to dribble past the opponent, pass to a teammate, perform a one-two (multiple passes between player and teammate), or shoot. When not in possession of the ball, the player has the option tackle the opponent, perform a passcut (if anticipating a pass), block the opponent, or simply stay put.

The player does not have to come in contact with an opponent to perform the above moves, he can perform them at any point during the game.

In addition to the default options mentioned above, there are also player-specific variations of the moves such as Robert's Gigadrive shot or Alfred's Kaiser tackle. These special abilities seem to defy the laws of physics (in a manner similar to Shaolin Soccer), but contribute significantly to the dynamic action of the game.

Before the start of each match, each player is assigned an amount of "guts" proportional to their level. Every default move they perform during the match takes a small amount from their guts. The more work a player does on the field, the more guts they lose. Thus, guts can be thought of as a measure of energy a player has. Special abilities will take a huge amount of guts from the player, rendering him useless after they perform one or two. When the player is low on guts, all he is able to do is pass to another player with more guts, or keep running with the ball. After every half-time, some of the player's guts are replenished, but the guts for a player do not regenerate when not controlling the player, unlike the Captain Tsubasa games.

In a somewhat humorous gesture, commentary is provided by an orange parrot wearing a suit, who is heavily biased towards the player's team. He cries if the team loses, but celebrates when the team is victorious.

=== Game modes ===
The game consists of two modes, Kick Off and All Stars, as well as having a Password option.

Kick Off is the main mode of gameplay, following the game's storyline. After winning each match, a 30-letter password is given to the player so he can continue his progress at a later time should he wish to stop. If a match is lost, the player has to repeat it as many times as it takes to win, thus there is no "game over". This does not apply to the second match in this mode, Dreams vs. Hams, which is next to almost impossible to win (there are those which have accomplished this feat to disappointing results—the game continues on as normal). To win this match the player should use "Passive Dribble" tactic (Robert, or David can stay, and dribble without moves) and wait for p.k. where Rudolf can miss the ball. If the player loses in this match, the game simply loads the next match. Also, the guts system does not seem to apply to opponents in this mode—they can use their special abilities over and over again.

Alfred's signature Flare shot

In All Stars mode, the player gets to create a custom team called the Dragons. The player first chooses the half-time length, and then proceeds to choose from the thirty playable characters. The player can then use this team to play against another human player, or against the CPU, the opposing team being called the Tigers in both cases.

When playing against a human player in this mode, the menu interface shown is slightly different, to prevent the opposing player from knowing what the other player selected.

Password mode allows the player to enter the 30-letter password obtained from Kick Off mode to continue their progress.

== Reception ==
Reception

Review score
Publication	Score
HobbyConsolas	82/100

== See also ==
- Captain Tsubasa
- Tecmo Cup Soccer Game

== Notes and references ==
1. Genesis Project Online, retrieved October 31, 2005
2. Walkthrough from GameFAQs, retrieved November 2, 2005
