= Football Manager 2023 =

2022 association football management simulation video game

- Developer(s): Sports Interactive
- Publisher(s): Sega
- Series: Football Manager
- Platform(s): Microsoft Windows, macOS, iOS, Android, Xbox One, Xbox Series X/S, PlayStation 5, Apple Arcade, iPad, Nintendo Switch
- Release: Microsoft Windows; 8 November 2022; PlayStation 5; 1 February 2023
- Genre(s): Sports management
- Mode(s): Single player, multiplayer

Football Manager 2023 is a football management simulation video game and the twentieth instalment in the Football Manager series developed by Sports Interactive and published by Sega. It was released on 8 November 2022 for most platforms, with early access beginning two weeks prior for Microsoft Windows and macOS, and the full game release for the PlayStation 5 having been delayed.

Football Manager 2023 Console, titled Xbox Edition in Football Manager 2022, was to be available on both Xbox and PlayStation consoles, making its debut on the latter; Football Manager 2023 Mobile was made available on both Android and iOS devices; and Football Manager 2023 Touch was released on both the Nintendo Switch and Apple Arcade. The Apple Arcade version was later delisted and replaced with Football Manager 2024 Touch.

Football Manager 2023 was the most played version of Football Manager as of June 2023, with more than double the users than average. Football Manager games usually have around two million players per year but Football Manager 2023 more than doubled this and had five million players.

== History ==
In November 2022, the much-anticipated Football Manager 2023 Console for the PlayStation 5 was delayed days prior to its release to an unannounced date, citing "unforeseen complications". On 25 January 2023, it was announced the inaugural PlayStation 5 edition of the game would be released on 1 February 2023.

== Features ==
As opposed to previous games in the series, Football Manager 2023 licensed UEFA club competitions. As part of the licensing agreement, the UEFA Women's Champions League would debut in a future version of the game. The packaging was improved to reduce its carbon footprint by 53%.

== See also ==
- Business simulation game
