= I Am Playr =

2011 video game

- I Am Playr logo
- Developer: We R Interactive / Big Balls Productions
- Platform: Browser / Unity / Adobe Flash
- Release: March 21, 2011
- Genres: Sports, Full motion video based game
- Mode: Single-player

I Am Playr was a first person association football video game with social network elements. It was available on the social–networking website Facebook. Jointly developed by We R Interactive and Big Balls Productions, the gamer plays as a professional footballer in a first-person perspective taking in events both on and off the football pitch that featured full motion video cutscenes.

== Gameplay ==
The main gameplay is in first-person, with the player deciding the actions of the character on and off the football pitch who plays for the fictional football team "River Park F.C.". In-match gameplay consists of scrolling text before switching to the first-person perspective as the player character gets chances on goal. Between games there is the opportunity to gain match fitness points by completing training exercises.

The season starts with the player character signing for River Park F.C., before moving on to the training ground to practise shooting skills. The in-game football show "Goal Mouth" also appears from time to time with Lee Dixon and Andy Townsend appearing as pundits. Virtual in-game items can improve the performance of the main character, in particular the three main statistics of accuracy, power and curl.

Revenue is generated by players purchasing equipment in the game, and from brand sponsorship. Several professional footballers make a cameo appearance in the game, including former Manchester United striker Teddy Sheringham, Tottenham Hotspur's Aaron Lennon and Arsenal's Theo Walcott. In December new features were added including free kick practice with Gary McAllister and appearances from Mark Noble. In 2016 the game had been deleted.

== Development ==
We R Interactive was originally backed by film producer Eric Fellner of Working Title Films and Fru Hazlitt of ITV. I Am Playr was revealed for the first time in November 2010, being billed as "the first–ever point–of–view football game". It is the company's first product.

We R Interactive worked together with the film company Big Balls Productions and Boss Reece for the interactive video elements of the game, the beta version of which took nine months to design and build. Co-founder of We R Interactive, Dave Rose said of the video elements, "Film gives us the ability to build characters and bring a more visceral feel to the interactive experience". During the closed beta, initial sponsors were found in the forms of Nike, Inc. and Red Bull, with Ginsters also being in-game sponsors on the fictional football team's kit, even though they sponsor Plymouth Argyle's shirts in real life. Alfa Romeo were added as an additional sponsor in May 2011, with their branding featured in in-game matches on sponsorship boards, and the Alfa Romeo MiTo being featured as a new gaming element. Bookies Betfred were also involved allowing players to bet on Premier League matches, and money won from bets was added to the player's cash.

In May 2011 a series of investors put a collective £3.1 ($5) million, including former England international footballer Lee Dixon. Dixon had also been added to the game's storylines, where he said of his role, "I'm excited to be adding my own real-life football experience – both on and off the pitch – to the game's storylines."

An affiliate marketing scheme has been created called "I Am Scout", where football bloggers and sites can sign up to access promotional items and content. A logging system of recording the goals scored by players signed up through those sites had entered the "scouts" in a leaderboard with the winner going on a trip to watch Real Madrid play.

== Reception ==
Reviewing the beta version in April 2011, Chris Derrer of PopFodder.com described I Am Playr as "horrendously addictive" and closed the review by recommending players to "Play it, love it, obsess over it. We have." However Alexander Bevier of Joystick Division had concerns about the novelty of the full motion video "wear[ing] thin".
