= Football Manager 2020 =

2019 association football management simulation video game

- Developer: Sports Interactive
- Publisher: Sega
- Series: Football Manager
- Platforms: Microsoft Windows, macOS, Nintendo Switch, iOS, Android, Google Stadia
- Release: Microsoft Windows; 18 November 2019; Google Stadia; 19 November 2019; Nintendo Switch; 10 December 2019
- Genre: Sports management
- Modes: Single-player, multiplayer (turn-based)

Football Manager 2020 is a football management simulation video game and the seventeenth instalment in the Football Manager series developed by Sports Interactive and published by Sega. It was released worldwide on 18 November 2019.

== Featured leagues ==
The game offers playable teams in 53 countries, across five continents: Africa, Asia, Europe, North America, and South America. Coverage is heavily slanted towards European teams, with 34 of its 51 constituent countries having playable leagues, while South Africa is the only country of Africa's total 54 that is covered. There are 118 leagues in this version. The new additions are the Canadian Premier League (added as DLC on 23 December 2019), the Gibraltar National League (forthcoming, post-release), the Gibraltar national football team, and the two new Welsh second-tier divisions (Cymru North and Cymru South).

26 leagues (across 14 countries) were fully licensed for the game, as was KNVB (Team Holland). The Germany national football team was reintroduced, having been omitted in Football Manager 2019, and the Gibraltar national football team was licensed for the first time, as was the Gibraltar National League. 21 Italian teams gained licences, including all of the 2019–20 Serie A teams except Brescia and Juventus (the latter of which appeared as Zebre).

== Licensing ==
Australia

- Hyundai A-League

Denmark

- Superliga

England

- EFL Championship
- EFL League One
- EFL League Two
- Vanarama National League

France

- Ligue 1
- Ligue 2

Germany

- Bundesliga
- 2. Bundesliga
- 3. Liga

Gibraltar

- Gibraltar national team
- Gibraltar National League

The Netherlands

- KNVB
- Eredivisie
- Keuken Kampioen Divisie

Northern Ireland

- NIFL Premiership
- NIFL Championship
- NIFL Premier Intermediate League

Poland

- Ekstraklasa

Scotland

- Ladbrokes Scottish Premiership
- Ladbrokes Scottish Championship
- Ladbrokes Scottish League One
- Ladbrokes Scottish League Two

South Korea

- K League 1
- K League 2

United States and Canada

- MLS

Wales

- Welsh Premier League

== Release ==
In June 2019, it was announced that Football Manager 2020 would be a launch title for the Google Stadia streaming platform. On 27 August 2019, Sports Interactive released a trailer for the release of the game. On 2 October 2019, Sports Interactive released another trailer about the new feature to be added in the game. On 6 December 2019, it was announced that the Nintendo Switch version would be released on 10 December 2019.

Versions
	Football Manager 2020 Mobile	Football Manager 2020 Touch	Football Manager 2020
Android	Yes	Yes	No
Stadia	No	No	Yes
iOS	Yes	Yes	No
macOS (via Steam)	No	Yes	Yes
Microsoft Windows (via Steam)	No	Yes	Yes
Nintendo Switch	No	Yes	No

== Reception ==
Reception

Aggregate score
Aggregator	Score
Metacritic	(PC) 84/100 (NS) 71/100

Review scores
Publication	Score
GamesRadar+	4/5
IGN	8.7/10
Nintendo Life	7/10 (Touch)
PC Gamer (US)	87/100
PCGamesN	8/10
Pocket Gamer	4.5/5 (Touch)

Football Manager 2020 received "generally favorable" reviews while Football Manager 2020 Touch for Switch received "mixed or average" reviews according to Metacritic, a review aggregator. PC Gamer praised the game's scope and the gameplay's potential, writing: "There's scope to play for countless seasons and still be presented with fresh challenges, and the new Development Centre system makes building for the future more compelling than ever." IGN wrote positively about the game's increased accessibility compared to prior entries, stating: "There's now real gratification in being a mid-table over-achiever, and entering Football Manager 2020 as a total beginner is a more realistic prospect than before." Dave James of PCGamesN found the game largely addicting, saying: "It looks as much of an iterative update as any FM game, but the added finesse of the new match engine, and the extra depth to the club staffing dynamics and development, make this the best version of the game yet." GamesRadar+ praised the game for its Club Vision Mode and Development Centre while criticizing it for its bad press conferences and inconsistent striker AI. The game sold over 3 million units.

== See also ==
- Business simulation game
