= Kick and Run =

- Developer: Taito
- Publisher: Taito
- Release: 1986
- Genres: Sports (association football)

Kick and Run is a football video game released in 1986 by Taito for arcade and in 1988 for the Famicom Disk System. The Mexico 86 bootleg, produced by Micro Research, was popular in Europe. The game had no sequel, but since 1990 Taito has invested in the Football Champ football video game series. In 2007 it was re-released for the PlayStation 2 in the Taito Memories II Vol.1 collection.

== Gameplay ==
Kick and Run is an arcade football game supporting up to four players, with two players able to control each team. Matches are presented from a scrolling perspective, with cartoon-style footballers and animated movements. The original arcade cabinet featured foot pedals for kicking the ball, alongside joystick controls. The game combined features of earlier arcade football titles, including scrolling playfields and multiplayer competition.

== Release ==
Kick and Run was released by Taito for arcades in 1986. The game was exhibited by Taito America at the AMOA Expo '86 trade show in Chicago, held from 6 to 8 November 1986. Japanese arcade industry publication Game Machine reported that Taito was prioritising European and North American markets for the title, highlighting its one-to-four-player cabinet and foot-pedal controls.

== Reception ==
Commodore User rated the game 6 overall.

In July 1987, Sinclair User ranked Kick and Run eighth in its "Top Ten Coin Ops" chart, compiled with assistance from a single arcade in London's West End. The magazine cautioned that the chart was not necessarily representative of arcade popularity across the United Kingdom.

The reviewers from the Italian Zzap! generally found Kick and Run to be disappointing and poorly executed due to frustrating controls, awful sound effects, and brainless AI, though one reviewer felt a touch of nostalgia for its simple 1986 arcade gameplay and funny animations.

The reviewer, Stefano Brusasca from Videogiochi, found Kick and Run to be a solid soccer game with fun details, options, and appealing graphics, though he ultimately felt its somewhat slow gameplay kept it from being truly revolutionary or overly exciting compared to World Cup.

A Super Console reviewer from 2002 praised Mexico 86 (Kick and Run) as the realization of a arcade-loving gamer's dream for its fun, manga-style graphics and energetic, foul-filled gameplay, capturing the nostalgia and raw passion of 1980s arcade football.

== Bibliography ==
- *VG Magazine*, Issue 44, April 1987, pp. 22–23
- *Crash Magazine*, Issue 39, April 1987, “Video Football”
