= World Championship Soccer =

1989 video game

- Developer: Sega
- Publisher: Sega
- Platforms: Arcade, Amiga, Atari ST, Commodore 64, MS-DOS, Mega Drive/Genesis, ZX Spectrum
- Release: NA: September 1989
- Genre: Sports
- Mode: Practice Tournament Two Player

World Championship Soccer (ワールドカップサッカー) is a soccer game running on Sega's Mega-Tech arcade cabinet system and was released as one of the first games for the Sega Genesis system in North America in September 1989.

The European Mega Drive release, World Cup Italia '90, was published jointly with Olivetti and Virgin Mastertronic and was an officially licensed franchise game of the 1990 FIFA World Cup with the official logo and mascot. After the World Cup licence expired the game was renamed to Sega Soccer on the Mega 6 compilation cartridge on the Mega Drive, removing the Virgin Mastertronic credit. A different game was also released as World Cup Italia '90 for the Master System in 1990 but this is not connected to World Championship Soccer.

In 1990, conversions by Elite Systems for MS-DOS, Amiga, Atari ST, Commodore 64, and ZX Spectrum were published.

A sequel, World Championship Soccer 2, was released in 1994 for the Genesis/Mega Drive.

== Gameplay ==
Arcade version. The player-controlled character is indicated by the white triangle.

The game presents a top-down view of a simple version of soccer (there are no fouls, substitutions, or strategies). Players must dribble and pass the ball towards one end of the field and try to score a goal by forcing the ball into the opposing team's net. When the player's team has the ball, the player can either dribble the ball across the field, kick the ball towards the goal, pass the ball in the air to another team member, or kick the ball forward in the direction that the player is currently facing. When the opposing team has the ball, the player can switch between different team members on the field, or slide kick their opponent to dislodge the ball from their control.

When the ball goes out of bounds, the game will switch to a full-screen graphical view for a corner kick or a goal kick. If the game ends in a tie and is not an elimination round match during the championship mode, the game will switch to a graphical penalty kick view.

To start a game, the player must first select which country they would like to be. Teams are rated on a scale from 1 to 5 (5 being the best) based on four different attributes (Speed, Skill, Defense, and Keeper). The best team in the game is Brazil, while the worst two teams are China and Japan. Games run for 90 minutes, where each minute in the game is actually 6 seconds. There are three audio tracks during game play, chosen based on the teams in the match.

== Playable countries ==
Upon release, some of the qualifying games for the tournament had not yet been played. This led to some of the playable countries in the video game not being the same as those who actually participated in the tournament. Due to this, the game features only 14 of the teams that would take part in the final tournament: Austria, Cameroon, Colombia, Costa Rica, Czechoslovakia, Egypt, Ireland, Romania, Sweden and the UAE do not appear in the game.

- United States
- Mexico
- Peru
- Brazil
- Argentina
- Uruguay
- Morocco
- Algeria
- England
- Scotland
- Italy
- France
- Spain
- Netherlands
- Denmark
- Belgium
- Hungary
- Yugoslavia
- Poland
- Soviet Union
- West Germany
- China
- Japan
- South Korea

== Reception ==
The One reviewed the home computer versions (Amiga, Atari ST, DOS) of World Championship Soccer in 1991, criticising the "rudimentary" ways the player may pass and shoot the ball, stating that "There are no fancy overhead kicks, headers, volleys or half-volleys here, nor anything that gives you effective control over the strength of your kick." The One furthermore calls World Championship Soccer a "mediocre alternative" to Kick Off 2, but expresses that while "there is nothing wrong with WCS's structure - it is more accurate than Kick Off 2's 'three points for a win' World Cup, and the quality of the teams is varied enough to keep you hooked ... the action lacks substance." The One calls World Championship Soccer "basic, no frills" soccer.

== See also ==
- World Cup USA '94
