= Pelé! =

1993 video game

- Developer: Radical Entertainment
- Publisher: Accolade
- Producer: Rory Armes
- Programmer: Alan Price
- Artists: Philip Bat Tse; Edgar Bridwell
- Composer: Marc Baril
- Platform: Sega Genesis
- Release: NA: December 1993; EU: January 1994
- Genres: Sports (association football)
- Modes: Single-player, multiplayer

Pelé! is a 1993 sports video game developed by Radical Entertainment and published by Accolade for the Sega Genesis. The game is based on the sport of association football and puts the player in control of a football team in modes of play such as exhibitions, tournaments, and seasons. It is named after and endorsed by former Brazilian footballer Pelé, who also provided input on the game's design.

Pelé! received mixed reviews from critics, who commended the graphics and amount of options, but criticized the controls and difficulty. A sequel, Pelé II: World Tournament Soccer, was released in 1994.

== Gameplay ==
An example of gameplay in Pelé!

Pelé! is a simulation of association football in which the player can control one of 40 national teams. Gameplay takes place from an isometric perspective, and during a match, the player controls the selected player's movement with the D-pad, while the button commands vary depending on whether the player is on offense, defense, or if the ball is in the air. On offense, the player can chip, shoot, or pass. On defense, the player can check, tackle, or switch control to the player closest to the ball. If the ball is in the air, a player may perform a header or a bicycle kick.

The usual rules of the sport apply, including fouls and the penalty box, corners, and offside; fouls can be triggered on or off in the options menu. The player can change formations at any time, with Pelé himself appearing to give advice on what formation to use. The game features four modes of play. In "Exhibition", players can play a match against a computer-controlled or human opponent. The player can also play through a 16-game "Tournament" or a 40-game "Season". The "Practice" mode allows players to perfect on-field moves without having to engage in a match. The player is capable of saving season and tournament progress, as well as compiling statistics for their team.

== Development and release ==
In the years preceding the 1994 FIFA World Cup, which would be hosted in the United States, interest in the sport within the country had increased. In April 1993, Accolade announced that it had signed exclusive licensing agreements with former Brazilian footballer Pelé and American ice hockey player Brett Hull to endorse and help design sports games for the SNES, Sega Genesis, and MS-DOS. To this end, Pelé worked alongside Canadian game developer Radical Entertainment and Accolade project manager Robert Daly. Many of Pelé's playing strategies were incorporated by Radical into the gameplay's logic. Alan Price programmed the game, while Philip Bat Tse and Edgar Bridwell served as lead artists. The sound effects and music were respectively created by Paul Wilkinson and Marc Baril. As none of the teams featured in the game provided endorsement, generic names were given to the game's teams, and only the players' surnames are included.

Pelé! was demonstrated at the 1993 Summer Consumer Electronics Show. It was released in North America in December 1993, and in Europe in January 1994. A version for the SNES was slated for a March 1994 release and reviewed by Diehard GameFan, but was not released. The game's Australian release was slated for the same date, but Sega Ozisoft was reportedly unimpressed by the game's quality and elected not to publish it in the region.

== Reception ==
Reception

Review scores
Publication	Score
Computer and Video Games	40%
Electronic Gaming Monthly	37/50
GamePro	14.5/20
Mean Machines Sega	30%
Electronic Games	91%

Pelé! received mixed reviews upon release. Arnie Katz of Electronic Games praised the large and detailed players, realistic artificial intelligence, and intuitive controls. Electronic Gaming Monthly stated that the game offered everything expected from the sports genre, but warned the mechanic of switching players during play was confusing. Athletic Supporter of GamePro appreciated the amount of options and deemed the graphics and audio to be above average (singling out the large player sprites and crowd noises respectively), but was frustrated by the penalty-filled gameplay, and he faulted the lack of an in-game clock.

Deniz Ahmet of Computer and Video Games felt that the focus on options came at the expense of the gameplay, which he said was marred by sluggish controls and lack of character between teams. Paul Glancey and Angus Swan of Mean Machines Sega condemned Pelé! as "an affront to the good name of soccer and the good name of Pelé"; while they acknowledged the large sprite size and fair amount of options, they derided the ropey controls and difficult goalkeepers, dismissed the music as "nauseating Hammond organ", and described the crowd sounds as "the spectators at a St Trinian's hockey match". Katz remarked that the full-motion video clips, while attractive on their own, did not blend well with the aesthetic presentation of the gameplay. Additionally, Swan considered the use of digitized video sequences to be "frankly irresponsible" due to the cartridge's size. Both Ahmet and the Mean Machines Sega reviewers noted the ball's habit of flickering during more frantic action.

== Sequel ==
A sequel, Pelé II: World Tournament Soccer, was developed by Radical Entertainment and published by Accolade in June 1994. It features four-player gameplay with the use of the Team Player or 4 Way Play multitap peripherals, and includes 24 playable national teams and nine settings within the United States. The game received a middling response from Electronic Gaming Monthly's reviewers, who regarded the game as typical of the soccer genre with no significant innovations apart from customizable weather conditions.
