= Gazza II =

1990 football game by Empire Interactive

- Developer: Empire Interactive
- Publisher: Empire Interactive
- Platforms: ZX Spectrum, Amstrad CPC, GX4000, Amiga, Commodore 64, Atari ST, IBM PC
- Release: 1990
- Genre: Sports
- Modes: Single-player, multiplayer

Gazza II is a football video game released for the Amstrad CPC, GX4000 in 1990 for the ZX Spectrum, Amiga, Atari ST, Commodore 64, and IBM PC compatibles. It was created by Empire Interactive and named after the popular English footballer Paul Gascoigne.

The game is a sequel to Gazza's Superstar Soccer, this time adopting an overhead horizontally scrolling display. It was later included in the compilation Soccer Stars.
