= Ultimate Beach Soccer =

2003 video game

- European Xbox cover art
- Developers: PAM Development; Magic Pockets (GBA)
- Publishers: DreamCatcher Interactive (NA); Wanadoo (EU)
- Platforms: Game Boy Advance; PlayStation 2 Xbox; Windows
- Release: Game Boy Advance: EU: May 30, 2003; NA: October 31, 2003; Windows, Xbox: EU: August 29, 2003; NA: November 14, 2003 (PC, Xbox)
- Genre: Sports
- Modes: Single-player, multiplayer

Ultimate Beach Soccer, released as Pro Beach Soccer in Europe, is a beach football video game developed by PAM Development and published by DreamCatcher Interactive (in North America) and Wanadoo (in Europe) in 2003 for the Game Boy Advance, PlayStation 2, Xbox and Windows.

== Gameplay ==
As per the standardised rules of beach football matches take place on a smaller field of play, with five players per side and unlimited substitutions allowed. Players have the choice of four stadia, located in Bangkok, Rio de Janeiro, Marseille or Venice Beach, with dusk and night time settings at each. 32 teams are included for selection, with real life players such as Eric Cantona, Julio Salinas and Daniele Massaro playable. Up to four players are supported on the Xbox and PS2 versions, with two players on the Game Boy Advance (via link cable) and PC.

== Development ==
The game was PAM Development's second football title, following on from 2000's Ronaldo V-Football. Development was undertaken with the cooperation of the Beach Soccer Worldwide organisation and Spanish beach footballers Ramiro Amarelle and Robert Valero Mato performed motion capture for the title. The working title for the North American release was X-Treme Beach Soccer.

== Reception ==
Writing in The Guardian Steve Boxer awarded the title 3/5, describing it as "laughably simple and lacking in subtlety when compared with full-blown football games such as Pro Evolution Soccer" but with potential appeal to those "seek[ing] instant entertainment in bite-size chunks". Russell Garbutt of Xbox Nation magazine was less positive, criticising the game animations as "stiff, jerky, and simply not compelling" and the controls as "clumsy and barely responsive", giving a score of 3/10.
