= Football Manager 2021 =

2020 association football management simulation video game

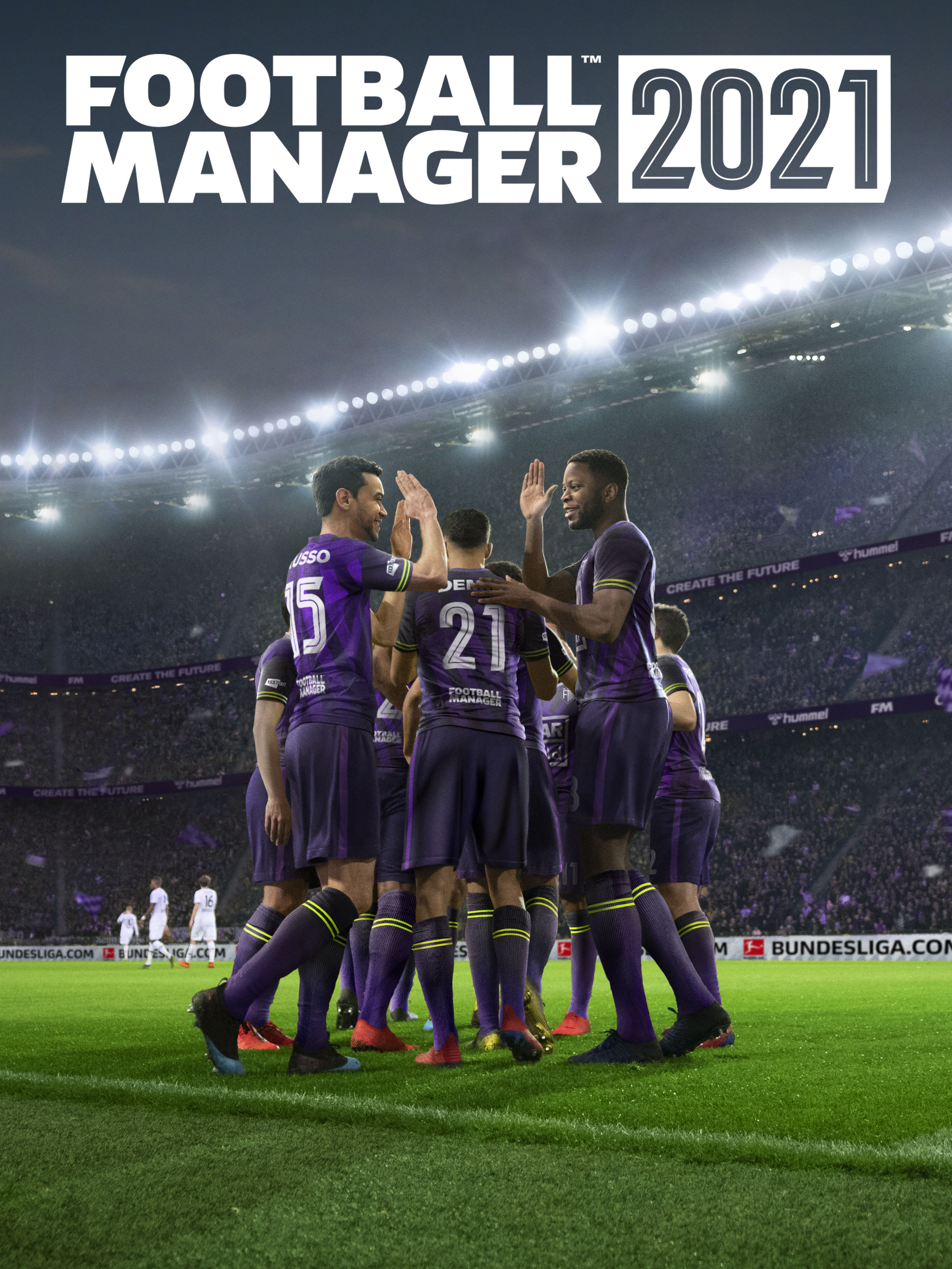
- Developer: Sports Interactive
- Publisher: Sega
- Series: Football Manager
- Platforms: Microsoft Windows, macOS, iOS, Android, Xbox One, Xbox Series X/S, Nintendo Switch
- Release: Microsoft Windows 24 November 2020; Touch, Xbox Edition 1 December 2020; macOS, iOS, Android 24 November 2020; Touch 1 December 2020; Xbox One, Xbox Series X/S 1 December 2020; Nintendo Switch 15 December 2020
- Genre: Sports management
- Modes: Single player, multiplayer

Football Manager 2021 is a football management simulation video game and the eighteenth instalment in the Football Manager series developed by Sports Interactive and published by Sega. It was released worldwide for Microsoft Windows, macOS, iOS, and Android on 24 November 2020. The streamlined version of the game titled Football Manager 2021 Touch was released on 1 December 2020 for the same platforms and for Nintendo Switch on 15 December 2020. The similar version titled Xbox Edition was released on 1 December 2020 for Xbox One, Xbox Series X/S, and Windows 10 via the Microsoft Store. It was the first game in the series to appear on an Xbox platform since Football Manager 2008 released in 2007.

== Features ==
The game headline features cover a number of key areas of the game including the interaction system, matchday experience, and the recruitment module. There are new communication methods, including gestures, and new interaction options between the manager, their players and the media. There are new presentation elements before, during and after a match, and an overhaul to the match engine AI. Expected goals, or xG, makes its debut in the series as part of a wider suite of data analysis changes through an xG model, built by Sports Interactive in partnership with SciSports. Trophy presentations have been revamped too. Managers can also take more control of their club's recruitment strategy with a new recruitment meeting.

Football Manager 2021 features 117 leagues from 52 nations across five continents: Africa, Asia (including Australia), Europe, North America, and South America. Coverage is heavily slanted towards European teams, with 34 of its 51 constituent countries having playable leagues, while South Africa is the only country of Africa's total 54 that is covered. 29 leagues (across 14 countries) were fully licensed for the game, as was KNVB (Team Holland). Italy's Serie A has licences for all its clubs except Juventus appearing as Zebre once again. The Germany national football team was not licensed, having been reintroduced in Football Manager 2020.

== Xbox edition ==
Football Manager 2021 saw the series return to Xbox consoles for the first time since 2007. Modelled on Football Manager Touch, the game's user interface has been designed to work with the Xbox controller and the game takes advantage of Microsoft's Smart Delivery and Play Anywhere technology to enable cross-play across Xbox One, Xbox One X/S, Xbox Series X/S, and Football Manager 2021 Xbox on Windows 10. Football Manager 2021 Xbox was enhanced on Xbox Series X/S with matches displaying in native 4K and up to 10 nations can be loaded up at any one time. The game released on 1 December 2020.

== Mobile ==
Football Manager 2021 Mobile introduced three new nations to the game: Argentina, Canada and Mexico, which took the total number of playable nations to 24. Tactical templates have been introduced for the first time that replicate the most popular styles of play in world football and managers can now develop their own set-piece routines. The Dynamics module has new displays of social groups, player relationships and squad hierarchy while the way that human managers can communicate with their players has been redefined. Other features include the ability to set up links with feeder clubs and arrange pre-season friendlies. Football Manager 2021 Mobile was released on iOS and Android on 24 November 2020.

== Football Manager 2021 Touch ==
Football Manager 2021 Touch encompasses many of the new additions from the Microsoft Windows and macOS versions. The interaction system, matchday experience, and new data analysis elements are included in the game. Football Manager 2021 Touch for Microsoft Windows, macOS, iOS, and Android was released on 1 December 2020 and the Nintendo Switch edition was released on 15 December 2020.

== Reception ==
Reception

Aggregate scores
Aggregator	Score
Metacritic	(PC) 85/100 (XSX) 78/100 (NS) 73/100
OpenCritic	92% recommend

Review scores
Publication	Score
Eurogamer	Recommended
GamesRadar+	5/5
Jeuxvideo.com	16/20
Nintendo Life	8/10 (Touch)
PC Gamer (US)	85/100
PCGamesN	9/10

Football Manager 2021 received "generally favorable" reviews while Football Manager 2021 Touch for Switch received "mixed or average" reviews according to the review aggregation website Metacritic. Fellow review aggregator OpenCritic assessed that the game received "mighty" approval, being recommended by 92% of critics.

PC Gamer praised the games' engaging depth, stating: "With a newfound litheness on the pitch and deep data analysis, FM21 gives you an easy excuse to relapse." Tapsell of Eurogamer praised the improvements made in comparison to entries prior, writing: "New tricks will make the headlines, but Sports Interactive's best move is to breathe new life into the brilliance that's already there." PCGamesN praised the game's uniqueness and said: "It's because there are precious few games out there that can impart this particular kind of pride of accomplishment, the kind you get from inspiring someone else to do a better job, or a team to work better together." GamesRadar+ gave the game five stars out of five, praising the game's accessibility and the improvements made to the user interface while criticizing its interviews and press conferences for being repetitive.

== See also ==
- Business simulation game
