= Soccer Manager 2024 =

- Developer: Invincibles Studio
- Publisher: Invincibles Studio
- Series: Soccer Manager
- Platforms: iOS, Android
- Release: 28 September 2023
- Genre: Sports

Soccer Manager 2024 (abbreviated as SM24) is a 2023 football management simulation game by Invincibles Studio. It was released on 28 September 2023 for Android and iOS and is part of the Soccer Manager series. The game is licensed by FIFPRO and Arsenal's Mikel Arteta is the game's ambassador.

== Gameplay ==
Soccer Manager 2024 is a football management game. It simulates management of approximately 900 clubs across 54 leagues in 36 countries. The game also features official FIFPRO-licensed players, and gameplay allows them to be transferred. Players can make decisions on training, tactics, and formations while developing club facilities.

== Development ==
Soccer Manager 2024 was developed and published by British company Invincibles Studio. It has an existing multi-year licensing agreement with Manchester City, worldwide agreements with partners which include the Deutsche Fußball Liga, together with a continued ambassador partnership with manager Mikel Arteta, and a wide-ranging FIFPRO player licence. It is also sponsoring The Scottish Premiership
