= Tecmo Cup Soccer Game =

- North American cover art
- Developer: Tecmo
- Publisher: Tecmo
- Composer: Keiji Yamagishi
- Series: Captain Tsubasa
- Platform: Nintendo Entertainment System
- Release: JP: April 28, 1988; NA: September 1992; EU: 1992
- Genres: Sports (association football); Role playing
- Mode: Single-player

Tecmo Cup Soccer Game, known as Captain Tsubasa (Note: Japanese: キャプテン翼, Hepburn: Kyaputen Tsubasa) in Japan and Tecmo Cup Football Game in Europe, is an association football sports video game released in 1992 by Tecmo for the Nintendo Entertainment System. The objective of the game is for the player to fight his way from junior league all the way to the finals of the World Cup.

Based on the Captain Tsubasa manga series, Tecmo Cup Soccer Game is a Westernized version of the Japanese Captain Tsubasa game released for the Family Computer system, featuring a different main character, a different introduction and more western-looking players. The game contains elements from role-playing games as the players have skill levels and are mostly controlled by different kinds of text commands.

== Summary ==
Considered to be the first of many games based on the series, which have appeared on many systems, this game was the innovator of games that would be known as "Cinematic Soccer". Rather than having direct control over the action like a standard soccer sim, the game has a cinematic angle where the player must choose his actions from a timed list and the results of these actions are animated on screen. Present-day games with a "career mode" setting would be inspired by this game's setup.

== Reception ==
Captain Tsubasa topped the bi-weekly Japanese Famitsu sales chart in May 1988.

== Differences ==
The changes from Captain Tsubasa to Tecmo Cup Soccer Game include:

- The game's intro was slightly changed. When the game was turned on, a soccer ball can be seen on a blue floor, rather than being accompanied by a young Tsubasa (on a green floor, probably to indicate grass) as in the Japanese version. Also, in the Japanese version, the plane was still shown (without the sky) in front of the logo, while in the American version, the plane was not shown in front of the logo at all.
- The main character (and pretty much all other characters except for the announcer and the referee) have been altered. Tsubasa, a spiky-headed, black-haired kid, has been changed to Robin Field, a blonde young adult.
- Moete Hero, the theme for the Captain Tsubasa anime, used in the intro and the second half of the game, has been replaced.
- When a new game begins, the words above the announcer that say "ON AIR" have been replaced with "TECMO!". Also, the "JBS" logo has been omitted.
- The board behind Billy, the instructor, goes from green to blue. There are no kids sitting down with him.
- The password system has Japanese characters replaced with the Latin alphabet.
- In the first half of the game, the song that plays while the player's team has the ball has been changed because it was a part of the song Moete Hero.
- In Captain Tsubasa, the player had to go through a short little sidequest after each match to have Taro Misaki play on his team, but Taro's Tecmo Cup Soccer Game counterpart joins the team right away and is portrayed as Robin's brother, Cecil.
- The quality of all goalkeepers in the game was dramatically upgraded, with some GKs (particularly the Zaps and Ninjas) being able to stop the special shot of Robin. Also, the GKs of Arabia (Argentina in the original), and Cameroon (formerly Uruguay) are hard to beat.
- There is a version in Spanish which was released in Spain, called Tecmo Cup Football Game. It is similar to Tecmo Cup Soccer Game, except the game is in the Spanish language.

== See also ==
- Tehkan World Cup
- Tecmo Cup Football Game
- Tecmo World Cup Soccer
