= Complete Onside Soccer =

1996 video game

- PlayStation cover art
- Developer: Elite Systems
- Publisher: Telstar Electronic Studios
- Platforms: PlayStation; MS-DOS
- Release: MS-DOS: PAL: June 21, 1996; PlayStation: PAL: June 21, 1996; JP: January 29, 1998; 3DO: NA: August 2007; (as Onside Soccer)
- Genre: Sports
- Modes: Single player, multiplayer

Complete Onside Soccer is a football simulation game programmed by Elite Systems and published by Telstar Electronic Studios for the PlayStation and MS-DOS. It was released in 1996 in Europe and 1998 in Japan.

It is one of the several games featured by Peter Schmeichel, like Peter Schmeichel Soccer or Soccer Superstars Peter Schmeichel

There is a version of Onside Soccer developed for the 3DO Interactive Multiplayer, which was released in 2007 by OlderGames.

== Gameplay ==
The game centres on team management and on-pitch play using British and European football teams of the 96/97 season. The game was generally not as popular or innovative as similar FIFA products but despite relatively poor graphics it can be rewarding with both 11-a-side or indoor 5-a-side. It supports a single player through tournaments and leagues or 2 players for versus play, with weather options and commentary.
