= Peter Beardsley's International Football =

1988 video game by Grandslam

- Developer: Grandslam
- Platforms: ZX Spectrum; Commodore 64; Amiga; Amstrad CPC; Atari ST; MSX
- Release: 1988
- Genre: Sports
- Modes: Single-player, multiplayer

Peter Beardsley's International Football is a football video game developed in 1988 by Grandslam and endorsed by Peter Beardsley.

== Gameplay ==
Players select an international team to play as, and can choose to play against the computer in a one player league format, or two players in a two player league format. They can then select the other teams in each group.

== Reception ==
The Commodore 64 version was reviewed poorly by Zzap!64, which gave it a score of 23%, stating that it is "one of the worst football games around at the moment".
