= Peter Shilton's Handball Maradona =

1986 video game

- Developer: Icon Design
- Publisher: Argus Press Software Ltd.
- Platforms: Amstrad CPC; Commodore 64; ZX Spectrum
- Release: Commodore 64: EU: 1986; Amstrad CPC: EU: 1986; ZX Spectrum: EU: 1986
- Genre: Sports simulation
- Modes: Single-player, multiplayer

Peter Shilton's Handball Maradona (referred to in title as Peter Shilton's Football) is a multiplatform association football simulation video game that was released in 1986 for the Amstrad CPC, Commodore 64 and ZX Spectrum. The game's title refers to the "hand of God" goal scored by Diego Maradona against England at the 1986 FIFA World Cup.

== Gameplay ==
In this typical match, Aston Villa are defeating Liverpool by a score of 2–0.

While the game is ostensibly a football simulation video game, it differs from other football games in that the player only ever controls the goalkeeper: instead of playing a full match, the player is presented with a number of preset scenarios (such as a standard attack, or a set piece like a corner kick or penalty kick) where the player is expected to save the shot on goal - to do this, the player can move freely within the six yard box, and jump or dive sideways. Once the shot is saved or the goal is conceded, the play stops and the game goes on to the next scenario.

The game features three game modes centered around the core mechanic:

- In Practice Session mode, the player is simply presented with a series of attacks they must save, with no score kept.
- In Play Game mode, the action happens within the confines of a football match, with two halves and a final score; while not seen, the player's team is able to score goals as well, but much like real life, as a goalkeeper, the player can only ensure their team doesn't concede any goals, and has no influence on whether their team scores any.
- In Skill Upgrade mode, the player has to save four consecutive shots to get to a higher skill level, after which the attacks get progressively more difficult to save. If successful, the player receives a 4-digit code they can enter the next time they start the game to resume from that skill level.

The player must pick one of sixteen teams of the Football League First Division, although no player names or team colours are featured.

The Commodore 64 version has some extra sound effects and some limited digitized speech.

== Reception ==
AllGame gave the game a score of 2.5/5 stars. Writing for Zzap!64, Julian Rignall judged the game as "vastly overpriced and not really worth buying", noting that while the core gameplay was fun, the repetitive nature didn't provide enough replay value.
