= Urban Freestyle Soccer =

2003 video game

- Developer: Gusto Games
- Publisher: Acclaim Entertainment
- Platforms: Mobile, GameCube, Microsoft Windows, PlayStation 2, Xbox
- Release: Mobile; 17 August 2003; Windows: EU: 6 February 2004; Xbox, PlayStation 2, GameCube: EU: 13 February 2004; EU: 5 March 2004 (GC); NA: 25 March 2004 (GC, Xbox)
- Genre: Sports
- Modes: Single-player, multiplayer

Urban Freestyle Soccer (known as Freestyle Street Soccer outside Europe) is a sports video game developed by British studio Gusto Games, a company announced in 2003, made up from eleven former employees of Silicon Dreams Studio, the game's original developer, which closed down in September that year. The game was published by Acclaim Entertainment and released for mobile phones, GameCube, Microsoft Windows, PlayStation 2 and Xbox, between August 2003 and March 2004. The GameCube and Xbox versions were released as a Blockbuster-exclusive in the U.S. in March 2004.

== Gameplay ==
Urban Freestyle Soccer is rather simple to play, as most sport-typed video games are. The player navigates his teammates via keyboard or controller/joypad, passing the ball, dribbling the opponents, and even playing dirty here and there. The player can clash at opposing teammates, knocking them down with kicks and punches, and can also use the objects from the environment of the playing field to throw at the opponents (like trash cans).

The game itself offers a number of types of games to play, from classical Freestyle matches up to the rather longer Street Challenge mode. The Turf Wars mode offers a player to pick a team (if you are playing for the first time, you'll be able to choose between the Skater Boys, Hardcore Honeys, Shakedown or Tagging Crew), and begin a Turf War, challenging other teams into playing on their home pitches. Each team has a specific, personally themed playing area (from obvious things like a skate park to warehouses, highschool pitches etc.). After each game is finished, depending on the outcome of it, the player obtains a certain number of skill points, which they can use the improve the statistics of their own team.

The campaign here is partially linear, giving the player options on which location/turf they will attack by using a map of the city. After defeating all of the "rival gangs" the Home Turf mode will become active. In this mode, the player is tasked with exactly the opposite of the Turf Wars mode. Here, the opposing teams keep attacking your own turf, and you are tasked to defend it by winning matches on it (your home turf). However, if you lose at any point during the Home Turf mode, you will have to start over from scratch again, unlike the Turf Wars mode where a defeat would just push you back from the turf of the opponent that defeated you. Once the Home Turf is completed, the final Street Challenge mode is unlocked, where a player plays through a league, combining points via scored goals, numbers of victories etc. The VS Mode and Freestyle are simple, one-on-one matches.

== Reception ==
Reception

Aggregate score
Aggregator	Score			
Aggregator	GameCube	PC	PS2	Xbox
Metacritic	48/100	N/A	40/100	40/100

Review scores
Publication	Score			
Publication	GameCube	PC	PS2	Xbox
Eurogamer	N/A	N/A	4/10	N/A
Game Informer	N/A	N/A	N/A	4/10
Gamekult	N/A	N/A	3/10	N/A
GameSpot	3.8/10	N/A	N/A	3.8/10
IGN	4.5/10	N/A	N/A	N/A
Jeuxvideo.com	9/20	9/20	9/20	10/20
Nintendo Power	2.6/5	N/A	N/A	N/A
Official Xbox Magazine (US)	N/A	N/A	N/A	4.7/10
PC Zone	N/A	54%	N/A	N/A
X-Play	N/A	N/A	N/A	2/5
Maxim	4/10	N/A	N/A	4/10

The GameCube, PlayStation 2 and Xbox versions received "generally unfavourable reviews" according to the review aggregation website Metacritic. Game Informer, IGN, Maxim, Official Xbox Magazine, and X-Play gave the latter console version negative reviews while it was still in development.

In the March 2007 issue of Electronic Gaming Monthly, Seanbaby listed the game as one of the Official Worst-Selling Games of 2006, describing it as "Soccer with the urban edge that no one imagined they'd hate so much."
