= UEFA Euro 2000 (video game) =

2000 video game

- Developer(s): EA Canada
- Publisher(s): EA Sports
- Series: UEFA Euro
- Platform(s): Microsoft Windows, PlayStation
- Release: Windows: EU: 28 April 2000; PlayStation: EU: 10 August 2000
- Genre(s): Sports, Football
- Mode(s): Single-player, Multiplayer

UEFA Euro 2000 is the official game of UEFA Euro 2000 football tournament hosted in Belgium and the Netherlands. The game was published by EA Sports and developed by EA Canada. It is available for PC and PlayStation.

The game was EA Sports' first game based on the European Championships after obtaining the official licence from UEFA, which had previously been held by Gremlin Interactive. The game features all 49 teams from the qualification stage of the Euro 2000 championships, as well as the hosts Belgium and the Netherlands who qualified for the finals automatically. The player can choose one of the teams and attempt to qualify them for the tournament and then participate in the finals themselves.

Paul Oakenfold provides the game's music, whilst commentary is from John Motson and Mark Lawrenson.

== Reception ==
=== Critical ===
Reviewing the PlayStation version, PlayStation Max made several comparisons to EA Sports' other football video game, FIFA 2000. They considered Euro 2000 to very similar but slower and more jerky to play than FIFA 2000 and also noted that it contained fewer teams compared to FIFA due to its focus on European international teams, whereas FIFA has international teams from across the world as well as club teams. This led to a rating of 65%. Eurogamer gave the same console version a negative review, stating, "It is tough to believe this game has been thoroughly playtested, but it's clearly passed all the necessary criteria to warrant shelf life. The whole product feels incredibly rushed, with more emphasis on making the menu system look nice than making a game worth playing." The site went on to say, "Even in the graphics department, things have taken a slight nose-dive, with player definition not up to the usual standards. The one saving grace is the crowd and commentary, but it's made pretty much redundant when offset against the game's overall failings," which led to a score of three out of ten.

IGN reviewed the PC version, commenting that the frame rate that the game ran at had dropped compared to FIFA 2000 possibly due to increased crowd and stadium detail. Noting the similarities between the game and FIFA 2000, they cited it as a "classic example of the company milking the soccer fan's money for yet another largely identical game of the FIFA soccer series" and suggested to "wait for FIFA 2001".
