= Real Football =

- Genre: Sports game
- Developer: Gameloft
- Publisher: Gameloft
- Platforms: Mobile: iOS, N-Gage 2.0, Nintendo DS, Java ME, Android
- First release: Real Football 2004
- Latest release: Real Football 2016/Real Football 2022

Real Football is a mobile phone sports video game franchise with gameplay emulating association football. The series was developed and published by French company Gameloft.

The Real Football series started in the mid-2000s with Real Football 2004, which was free on some mobile phones. New installments of the series were then published every year. The games feature both national teams and local clubs, and allow the player to play in various "real-life" cups.

The series became one of the most popular mobile games in the late 2000s, in some places outselling mobile editions of FIFA and PES. Real Football 2008 was the first in the series to be published on more than just mobile phones, as a Nintendo DS version was also produced. A special edition based on UEFA Euro 2008 was also released. Real Football 2009 added an iOS version, and expanded the team lineup. At the 2009 Mobile World Congress, Real Football 2009 won the award for Best Mobile Game. Real Football 2010 received at least 10 million downloads. Real Football 2012 added an Android version. Real Football 2018 was the last game in the series to be released on Java ME.

Unlike other games, players in the Real Football series appear under fictional names, with the exception of the installments released between 2007 and 2013, which held the FIFPRO license. High licensing costs meant that real names for some national teams were lost. From the 2014 edition onwards, the game lost all licenses.

From 2016 onwards, Gameloft opted to release a single free-to-play mobile game, Real Football 2017, which received annual updates as freemium until 2022, when its final update, Real Football 2022, was released. Some fans have created unofficial mods.

== Games ==
Official titles released by Gameloft:

- Real Football 2004
- Real Football 2005
- Real Football 2006
- Real Football 2007
- Real Football Manager Edition 2007
- Real Football 2008
- Real Football 2008: European Tournament
- Real Football 2009
- Real Football Manager Edition 2009
- Real Football 2010
- Real Football: Manager Edition 2010
- Real Football 2011
- Real Football 2012
- Real Football 2013
- Real Football Manager Edition 2013
- Real Football 2014
- Real Football 2015
- Real Football 2016
- Real Football 2017
- Real Football 2018
- Real Football Runner - KaiOS
- Real Football 2019
- Real Football 2020
- Real Football 2021
- Real Football 2022
