= Kenny Dalglish Soccer Match =

1990 video game

- European cover art
- Developer: Impressions Games
- Publishers: NA: Impressions Games; EU: Impressions Games
- Designer: John Ruskin
- Composer: Christopher J. Denman
- Platforms: Commodore 64; ZX Spectrum; Atari ST; Amstrad CPC; Amiga
- Release: Commodore 64: NA: 1990; EU: 1990
- Genre: Sports
- Modes: Single-player, Multiplayer

Kenny Dalglish Soccer Match is a computer game based on Scottish ex-football player and manager Kenny Dalglish - who managed and played for Liverpool, Blackburn Rovers, Celtic and the Scotland national team. Dalglish would also become famous for winning the FA Cup while playing and managing for the same team.

The Australian magazine PC PowerPlay gave this game a rating of 5% in its February 1990 issue.

== Gameplay ==
While the red player is rushing towards the ball, some of the guys on the blue team are trying to stop him.

This was Dalglish's second licensed game and a side-scroller with a team in red playing against a team in blue.

The skill level is divided into nine levels so that rookies can play against video game veterans. Passing the ball is similar to the Kick Off series except that it's only possible to make long passes; making quick passing purely a matter of luck. The ball bounces excessively; making it very difficult to shoot on target for less than 30 yards.

Matches can last anywhere from 10 to 90 minutes; there are no leagues or tournaments to play against other teams. There are digitized photos of Dalglish himself; inspiring players to achieve goals and to have "good results." Oddly enough, the player must type in the name (city, county, official nickname, etc.) of his team as well as the opponent's. This means that players can have their local weekly football club play against Manchester United or Chelsea with no difference in gameplay. Kenny Dalglish always gives the player valuable advice; expert players can choose to ignore it.
