= Pure Football =

2010 video game

- Box art featuring Steven Gerrard
- Developer: Ubisoft Vancouver
- Publisher: Ubisoft
- Platforms: PlayStation 3, Xbox 360
- Release: EU: May 28, 2010; AU: May 27, 2010; NA: June 1, 2010
- Genre: Sports
- Modes: Single-player, multiplayer

Pure Football (also known as Pure Futbol in North America) is a football video game developed by Ubisoft Vancouver and published by Ubisoft. It was announced in March 2010 with a trailer and was released June 1, 2010, for PS3 and Xbox 360. This is an arcade-style football game in which players can select five-a-side teams from around the world, with emphasis on technical moves, pitches with urban environments outside stadiums, and no referees. The game includes seventeen national teams, most of which have licensed crests and kits (with the exceptions of Brazil and Denmark), and three special teams (US all-time team, Germany, and World One). Players compete in exhibition and campaign gameplay modes.

== Reception ==
Pure Football received negative reviews from critics. On Metacritic, the game holds scores of 46/100 for the PlayStation 3 version based on 12 reviews and 38/100 for the Xbox 360 version based on 20 reviews.
