= Gazza's Super Soccer =

1989 video game

- Developer: Empire Interactive
- Publisher: Empire Interactive
- Platforms: Amiga 500/600, Amstrad CPC, Commodore 64, Atari ST, ZX Spectrum
- Release: 1989
- Genre: Sports
- Modes: Single-player, multiplayer

Gazza's Super Soccer is a football game released for the Amstrad CPC, ZX Spectrum, Amiga 500/600, Atari ST and Commodore 64 platforms. It was created in 1989 by Empire Interactive, and was named after the popular English footballer Paul Gascoigne. It was also released in the Netherlands and Germany as Bodo Illgner's Super Soccer and in Scandinavia as Anders Limpar's Proffs Fotboll.

The game was included in several sports games compilations, such as Soccer Mania and Grandstand. The game also had a sequel, named Gazza II.

== Gameplay ==
The game has no scroll. Instead, it has three different screens showing one third of the field each. In one the player gets a side view of the middle of the field. When the ball goes out of the screen, a new screen with the goal at its top is shown (the camera is "flying" over the middle of the field).

A triangle is used to indicate the height and side effect of each shot.
