= Marcel Desailly Pro Soccer =

2003 video game

- North American N-Gage box art
- Developers: Gameloft S.A. G Artist (N-Gage); Anco Software (PC, PS1 & PS2)
- Publishers: Gameloft; Ubisoft (PS1 & PS2)
- Platforms: Mobile phone, N-Gage, Palm OS, PlayStation, PlayStation 2, Windows
- Release: Mobile: WW: July 22, 2003; N-Gage: NA: April 28, 2004; EU: May 10, 2004; Playstation: EU: June 20, 2002; Windows: EU: 2002
- Genre: Sports
- Modes: Single player, Multiplayer

Marcel Desailly Pro Soccer is a soccer video game developed and published by Gameloft for mobile phones, Nokia N-Gage, Windows, PlayStation and PlayStation 2 (as Marcel Desailly Pro Football). The title is based on French football player Marcel Desailly. The console version was renamed WM Nationalspieler in Germany and Sven-Göran Eriksson's World Challenge in the UK.

== Reception ==
Reception

Aggregate scores
Aggregator	Score	
Aggregator	mobile	N-Gage
GameRankings	84%	75%
Metacritic	N/A	48/100

Review scores
Publication	Score	
Publication	mobile	N-Gage
GamesMaster	N/A	80%
GameSpot	8.7/10	N/A
IGN	8/10	N/A

The N-Gage version received "generally unfavorable reviews" according to the review aggregation website Metacritic. German magazine PC Games gave the PC version a 21 out of 100 criticizing the lack of a license for the teams, a catastrophic ball physic, the controls and the lack of depth in the gameplay.
