= European Championship 1992 =

1992 video game

- Developer: Tecmo
- Publisher: Elite
- Platforms: Amiga, Atari ST, MS-DOS
- Release: 1992
- Genre: Sports

European Championship 1992 is an association football sports video game produced by Tecmo and distributed by Elite in 1992. It was released for the Amiga, Atari ST and MS-DOS. It is a conversion of the arcade video game World Cup '90 from Tecmo. It includes tackling, short passes, long passes, volleys, headers, power headers, intercepting headers, free kicks, throw-ins, corners, goal kicks, one or two players, action replays, saving goals, saving games, red and yellow cards, streakers, concussed players, and fighting players. It features the 1992 European Football Championship.

The game allows one and two (competitive) players, playing matches of 5, 10, or 20 minutes.
