= Soccer Mania =

1990 video game

- North American cover art
- Developer(s): Kitty Group
- Publisher(s): JP: CBS/Sony Group; NA: Sony Imagesoft
- Platform(s): Game Boy
- Release: JP: April 27, 1990; NA: March 1992
- Genre(s): Sports, simulation
- Mode(s): Single-player, multiplayer

Soccer Mania, known in Japan as Soccer Boy (サッカーボーイ), is a soccer-themed sports simulation video game for the Nintendo Game Boy. It was released in 1990 in Japan and two years later in North America. The two releases differ slightly: in Soccer Mania, the player plays as the USA team, while in Soccer Boy, the player plays as the Japan team.

== Gameplay ==
The player plays as either the USA team (in Soccer Mania) or the Japan team (in Soccer Boy) with the goal of defeating the other countries in a game of soccer: Brazil, Great Britain, West Germany (known as FRG / Federal Republic of Germany in-game), France, and either Japan, if playing Soccer Mania, or USA, if playing Soccer Boy. One player of the team is controlled at a time, with the view of the game focusing on wherever the ball is on the field.

A two-player mode exists where two people can play against each other utilizing the Game Boy's Link Cable functionality.

== Reception ==
Reception

Review score
Publication	Score
Aktueller Software Markt	17%

Aktueller Software Markt dismissed the game, citing the "crappy" scrolling, "catastrophic" controls and inability to distinguish the teams of players on the field.
