= Fluid Football =

2012 video game

- Developer: Chromativity
- Publisher: AppyNation

The game places and emphasis on tactical play.

Fluid Football is a mobile association football game developed by independent studio Chromativity and published by AppyNation for iOS, Android, Amazon Kindle, Barnes & Noble Nook, and BlackBerry devices. As of December 11, 2012, the game has received over one million downloads.

== Development ==
Pundits Andy Gray and Richard Keys assisted in the creation of the game.

== Reception ==
Android Magazine rated the game 5/5 and received the publication's editor's choice award: "What makes the game stand out is the level of tactical awareness you need to have – you need to negotiate the offside trap, while also making sure the receiving player is free in the penalty box before you shoot."
