= Stickman Soccer =

- Genre: Soccer
- Developer: Djinnworks GmbH
- Publisher: Djinnworks GmbH
- Platforms: Android iOS
- First release: Stickman Soccer Classic; 2013
- Latest release: Stickman Soccer 2018; 2018

Stickman Soccer is a mobile game series for Android and iOS devices developed by Austrian studio Djinnworks.

== Video games ==
- Stickman Soccer Classic (2013)
- Stickman Soccer 2014 (2014)
- Stickman Soccer 2016 (2016)
- Stickman Soccer 2018 (2018)

== History ==
The 2017 version had the paid option, which removes ads and unlocks new features including street soccer mode and teams mode.

The Stickman Soccer 2018 was released in May and was followed up in the next month with an update correlated with 2018 FIFA World Cup. The update included the ability to customize leagues and football rules, as improved goalkeepers AI. The number of available players has increased, and the list of their characteristics became more detailed.

== Reception ==
Christian Cawley, in his 2017 review for MakeUseOf, described the game as "fun and disposable", lacking the "hardcore soccer atmosphere of FIFA" game series, but providing enough fun to play it. Additionally, he thought that the ads were too intrusive.
