= Liverpool (video game) =

1990 video game

- John Barnes on the box cover
- Developer: Arc Developments
- Publisher: Grandslam Entertainment
- Designers: Jason Stoat; Jon Harrison; Tim Coupe
- Composer: Allister Brimble (Amiga)
- Platforms: Amstrad CPC, Atari ST, Commodore 64, Amiga, MS-DOS
- Release: 1990: Amstrad; 1992: Amiga, ST, MS-DOS; 1993: C64
- Genre: Sports
- Modes: Single-player, multiplayer

Liverpool (also known as Liverpool: The Computer Game) is an association football video game released in 1990 for the Amstrad CPC. In 1992, versions were released for the Atari ST, Amiga and MS-DOS platforms. A Commodore 64 port was released in 1993. The game was developed by Arc Developments and published by Grandslam Entertainment. Liverpool is based on the Liverpool F.C. football team. One or two players can play Liverpool.

A ZX Spectrum version was advertised, but never released.

== Gameplay ==
Liverpool is a football video game that allows the player to take control of Liverpool F.C. and play against other teams in the English football league system and FA Cup. The game allows the player choose the formation and pick the team from real players in the Liverpool squad. Before practice games, the player can also set the pitch type and duration. The gameplay consists of running with and without the ball, trapping the ball, throw ins, corner kicks and goal kicks. Liverpool also includes injuries and punishments from receiving red or yellow cards. The player can use a joystick or keyboard to control the game

The player can play in Full Season mode where matches in both the league and FA Cup are played, or in FA Cup Only mode, where the cup competition alone is played. The best achievement in the game is winning the double.

Each version of Liverpool for the different platforms included the updated Liverpool F.C. squad from the current season.

== Reception ==
The different versions of Liverpool received mixed reviews. The Amstrad CPC version received a low 9% from Computer and Video Games. The magazine criticised the gameplay as "sluggish" and said the controls were frustrating. The Commodore 64 version was considerably different and received 93% from Commodore Force. The magazine praised the smooth controls and artificial intelligence of the opposition. CU Amiga rated the Amiga version of Liverpool 70%. The review said that the controls are sluggish and jerky and the animations of the players are very basic. The magazine recommended the game mainly for fans of the Liverpool football club.
