= European Soccer Challenge =

1990 video game

- Amiga cover art
- Developer: Smash 16
- Publisher: Software Sorcery
- Composer: Matt Furniss
- Platforms: Amiga, Amstrad CPC, Commodore 64, ZX Spectrum
- Release: Amiga/CPC: EU: 1990
- Genre: Sports
- Modes: Single-player, multiplayer

European Soccer Challenge is an association football (soccer) video game developed by Smash 16 and distributed by Software Sorcery for the Amiga and Amstrad CPC in 1990.

== Reception ==
The game was reviewed in Commodore Format Magazine in which the reviewer felt the movement was jerky and called the game "agony" to play, only giving the score of 20%
