= Zico Soccer =

1994 video game

- Cover art
- Developer: Electronic Arts
- Publisher: Electronic Arts Victor
- Composer: Akira Takemoto
- Platform: Super Famicom
- Release: JP: March 4, 1994
- Genre: Traditional soccer simulation
- Mode: Single-player

Zico Soccer (ジーコ サッカー) from Electronic Arts is a football management video game released for the Super Famicom that allows players to become the head coach of an international football team; it was named after the Brazilian midfielder Zico, who at the time was playing for Japanese team Kashima Antlers. The game is mostly in the Japanese language although some words are in the English language.

== Gameplay ==
Zico Soccer has an unusual control system where the player must move a cursor across the screen, and is thus compatible with the Super Famicom Mouse. The player can manage one of 25 teams, one of which is the Kashima Antlers with its real-life roster at the time of release; the rest are national teams with fictional players, with most other FIFA member nations excluded.

The game starts with a coin toss and the winner chooses to have possession of the football or to choose what side of the field to defend. Instead of directly controlling the players, the manager/player must choose who must pass the ball to which player, where to shoot the football, where to move the players on the board, and how they should shoot the football.

There is an exhibition mode, training mode, and two different kinds of cup (tournament) modes. Unlike most other sports games on the Super Famicom, there is no multiplayer mode.

== Reception ==
The game received middling reviews in Japan, with criticisms including a skill floor too high for beginners and its haphazard licensing restrictions. Because of this, Zico Soccer became better known for its poor sales than its actual content: it was popularly called a “typical throwaway title from the late Super Famicom era”, and one store reported that new copies were piled up on the wagon for as low as 10 yen. The Japanese gaming magazine GameLab (ゲームラボ) jokingly referred to Zico Soccer as "Bargain-bin Zico" (激安ZICO, Gekiyasu Jīko).

Due to Zico Soccer's low price, developers of unlicensed adult video games would purchase cartridges in bulk and replace the game's hardware boards with their own, since Nintendo had exclusive cartridge manufacturing rights. EJ Corporation used this method to release its series SM Chōkyōshi Hitomi (SM調教師瞳); because of this, many used copies of Zico Soccer sold in Japan contain these games instead of the original.

Although Zico Soccer was advertised as directly supervised by Zico, when asked about the game in 2026, Zico claimed he only helped with advertising materials and had since forgotten about its existence.

== See also ==
- Isto é Zico: Jiko no Kangaeru Soccer (Sega Saturn Interactive movie endorsed by Zico)
