= Combination Pro Soccer =

1998 video game

- Cover art
- Developer: Kuusoukagaku
- Publisher: Axela
- Platform: PlayStation
- Release: JP: June 18, 1998
- Genre: Sports
- Modes: Single-player; Multiplayer

Combination Pro Soccer: J.League no Kantoku ni Natte Sekai wo Mezase! (コンビネーションプロサッカー Jリーグの監督になって世界をめざせ！) is a 1998 Japan-exclusive soccer simulation video game released for the PlayStation.

== Summary ==
The game starts with two animated/cinematic intro sequences. In the second one, the Agony of Doha is remembered.
