= Fever Pitch Soccer =

1995 video game

- Developers: U.S. Gold; Silicon Dreams Studio (Super NES); Distinctive Developments (Jaguar)
- Publishers: U.S. Gold; Atari Corporation (Jaguar)
- Director: N. Ishihara
- Designers: Martin Sawkins; Rod Mack
- Programmer: James Robertson
- Artists: Colin Wren; Emil Sergiev; Hayden Jones
- Composers: John Hancock; Max Little
- Platforms: Sega Genesis/Mega Drive; Super NES; Atari Jaguar
- Release: Genesis: NA: 1995; EU: 30 June 1995; Super NES: EU: August 1995; NA: September 1995; Jaguar: NA: 15 December 1995; EU: 15 December 1995
- Genre: Sports
- Modes: Single-player, multiplayer

Fever Pitch Soccer, known as Head-On Soccer in North America, (Note: Also known as Mario Basler: Jetzt geht's los! in Germany on the Genesis and SNES.) is a soccer video game originally developed and published by U.S. Gold for the Sega Genesis/Mega Drive in 1995.

Featuring an arcade-style approach to soccer compared to other titles that were released at the time, Fever Pitch Soccer allows players to have the choice of playing across any of the game modes available against with either CPU-controlled opponents or other players with the team of their choosing. Initially launched for the Genesis, it was then released on the Super Nintendo Entertainment System a few months after the original version and was later ported to the Atari Jaguar in December of the same year.

Fever Pitch Soccer received generally positive reception from critics since its release on the Genesis/Mega Drive, with praise towards the graphics, sound, gameplay and the ability to upgrade the various abilities of the team players upon winning matches. The Super NES version also received positive reception, with praise to the improved graphics and sound from the Genesis original while the Jaguar version, though criticized for not taking advantage of the hardware, was generally well-received and considered by some reviewers as one of the better titles for the system. Critics, however, compared the game with both the FIFA series from Electronic Arts and the original International Superstar Soccer from Konami.

== Gameplay ==
Gameplay screenshot showcasing a match between Sweden and Germany (Genesis/Mega Drive version)

Fever Pitch Soccer is a soccer game that is played from an isometric perspective in a two-dimensional environment with sprites. Although it follows the same gameplay as with other soccer titles at the time and most of the sport's rules are present as well, the game opts for a more arcade-styled and slapstick approach of the sport, instead of being a full simulation, as the team players tends to have a lean towards "dirty" play, in addition of having their respective special abilities such as the ability to dive in an attempt to win a free-kick or penalty and as the player's team wins games, they gain access to additional team players. There are also multiple stadiums to choose from, each with their own characteristics.

With the exception of the Jaguar port, the Genesis and SNES versions feature support for multitap accessories, allowing more than two people for multiplayer. Every version also have five types of language settings to choose from at the main menu screen and a password system to resume progress.

=== Modes ===
There are two main gameplay modes to pick at the menu: Tournament and Exhibition. Exhibition, as the name implies, is a non-competitive mode for two or more players, while Tournament is the main mode of the game, where players compete against computer-controlled teams and a password is given out following the successful completion of each game in this mode so that progress can be resumed at any given point.

=== Teams ===
There are 51 teams available to choose from before the start of any mode, each one representing their country and having their own in-game behavior.

== Development and release ==
The Jaguar port was originally previewed in early 1995 by French magazine CD Consoles under the name Red Hot Soccer, featuring various differences compared to the final version, and was also showcased at Autumn ECTS '95. Atari Corporation UK marketing manager Darryl Still stated in a 2016 interview that the game was chosen to be ported for the Jaguar as part of Atari's European center of development, which was established in January of the same year with the aim of working alongside small game developers around the region to make titles for the system.

Fever Pitch Soccer was first released for the Sega Genesis/Mega Drive in Europe on June 30, 1995 by U.S. Gold, followed by North America sometime that same year. It was then released for the Super Nintendo in Europe in August 1995 and a month later in North America. In Germany, the game is known as Mario Basler: Jetzt geht's los! ("Here We Go!") on both the Genesis/Mega Drive and Super NES, due to being endorsed by the former German winger athlete Mario Basler. It was ported to the Atari Jaguar by Distinctive Developments and published by Atari Corporation in both North America and Europe on 15 December 1995, under the name Fever Pitch Soccer in both regions (previous North American releases of the game used the title Head-On Soccer). A version for the 32X was planned but never released.

== Reception ==
Reception

Review scores
Publication	Score		
Publication	Atari Jaguar	Sega Genesis	SNES
Consoles +	N/A	N/A	75%
Computer and Video Games	74 / 100	89 / 100	88 / 100
Game Players	N/A	80%	80%
GamesMaster	N/A	72 / 100	N/A
Joypad	N/A	N/A	88%
Mean Machines Sega	N/A	90 / 100	N/A
Mega Fun	N/A	82%	87%
Micromanía	N/A	N/A	71%
Next Generation	3/5	3/5	3/5
Player One	N/A	75%	75%
Superjuegos	N/A	N/A	85 / 100
Total!	N/A	N/A	2
Video Games (DE)	72%	76%	77%
MAN!AC	72%	80%	72%

Reviewing the Super NES version, Next Generation said that the game has more strategy than the average soccer sim and is decently fun, especially when using a multitap. GamePro gave both the Genesis/Mega Drive and Super NES versions positive reviews. They commented that the unrealistic gameplay makes it more fast-paced and potentially more fun than other soccer simulations and were especially pleased with the exaggerated soccer moves which would not be possible in real life. They also remarked that the graphics and sounds of the Genesis/Mega Drive version, while not as good as those of the Super NES version, were more than good enough. Their review of the later Jaguar version said that though it is a port of the Super NES version with no enhancements to make use of the next-generation hardware, "it's still fun". Next Generation also found the Jaguar version retained the fun of the game. The reviewer summarized, "Not exactly the game for soccer idealists, Fever Pitch Soccer is fun, but it's a little on the frivolous side." Next Generation reviewed the Genesis/Mega Drive version of the game, and stated that "Ultimately, Head On Soccer is easy to play and, unfortunately, it's just as easy to stop playing." In 1995, Total! ranked Fever Pitch Soccer 98th on their Top 100 SNES Games summarizing: "Not that accomplished as a full-on footy sim, but the comedy makes it that little bit different."
