= RedCard 2003 =

2002 video game

- PAL region cover art for the Xbox
- Developers: Midway Home Entertainment; Point of View (GC, Xbox)
- Publisher: Midway Sports
- Engine: RenderWare
- Platforms: PlayStation 2, GameCube, Xbox
- Release: PlayStation 2: NA: April 16, 2002; PAL: May 17, 2002; GameCube, Xbox: NA: June 25, 2002; PAL: July 5, 2002 (GC); PAL: July 12, 2002 (Xbox)
- Genre: Sports
- Modes: Single-player, multiplayer

RedCard 2003, known as RedCard in Europe, is a video game based on association football, released in 2002 by Point of View. The game follows most of the laws of football, but allows for heavy tackles and special moves once the player has charged up a special meter.

The game, released on the Nintendo GameCube, Xbox, and PlayStation 2, allows the player to compete across all the continents (including Antarctica) in a "world conquest" mode, which in turn unlocks the finals mode (World Cup). On each continent, the player begins against an easy team and faces increasingly more difficult opponents.

Brian McBride is depicted on the game's American cover art. The PAL version features a parody of the infamous Vinnie Jones / Paul Gascoigne groin grabbing incident, re-created by actors.

== Reception ==
Reception

Aggregate score
Aggregator	Score		
Aggregator	GameCube	PS2	Xbox
Metacritic	71/100	73/100	67/100

Review scores
Publication	Score		
Publication	GameCube	PS2	Xbox
Famitsu	N/A	26/40	N/A
Game Informer	N/A	8/10	N/A
GameRevolution	N/A	B	N/A
GameSpot	7.5/10	7.8/10	7.5/10
GameSpy	N/A	80%	3/5
GameZone	7.8/10	8.8/10	7.6/10
IGN	7.2/10	7.2/10	6.4/10
Nintendo Power	4.2/5	N/A	N/A
Official U.S. PlayStation Magazine	N/A	3/5	N/A
Official Xbox Magazine (US)	N/A	N/A	6.5/10
BBC Sport	N/A	77%	N/A
Playboy	N/A	75%	N/A

The game received "average" reviews on all platforms according to the review aggregation website Metacritic. In Japan, where the PlayStation 2 version was ported for release under the name RedCard (レッドカード, ReddoKādo) on June 27, 2002, Famitsu gave it a score of 26 out of 40.

Maxim gave the PS2 version four stars out of five, saying, "Nothing jazzes up a sport better than flagrant infractions." BBC Sport gave it 77%, saying, "While this is definitely not a game to for serious fans, for those who want a half decent footie title with lots of fun extras - then Red Card [sic] makes a great alternative." Playboy gave it 75%, saying, "The game's too footloose for FIFA fans, not outrageous enough for Blitz devotees."
