= Kenny Dalglish Soccer Manager =

1989 video game

- Developer: Zeppelin Games
- Publisher: EU: Zeppelin Games
- Designer: Ian Copeland
- Platforms: Commodore 64; ZX Spectrum; Atari ST; Atari 8-bit Amstrad CPC; Amiga
- Release: EU: 1989
- Genre: Association football management
- Modes: Single-player, multiplayer

Kenny Dalglish Soccer Manager is a 1989 video game that was released in Europe. The game involves taking the role of Kenny Dalglish as he manages an English football team from the Football League Fourth Division right to the Football League First Division.

== Gameplay ==
The game shows a job security rating as one of the statistics.

The game is played mainly through icons and menus. A chairman can be consulted if players made the right decision while a physiotherapist can check for player injuries and the football scout can find players that can be recruited into the team. Match highlights can be either enable or disabled; but the results tell the identical story as the highlights.

Prior to each game, players can be transferred to and from the reserves list in order to determine a starting lineup for each game. Each player is sorted by their offense and defense ratings in addition to their age and ability levels. Players are also reminded when a game is either a league game, a cup games, or a simple friendly match that doesn't determine anything. All transactions are done using the English pound currency. Even the attendance and amount of money earned from gate fees are tracked in the game.

In the actual game itself, basic 16-color graphics help to keep track of the on-screen football action. Loans can be acquired from the in-game bank in order to keep the team afloat; owing too much money to the bank forces the board of directors to fire the player for financial incompetence.

== Reception ==
Your Sinclair magazine gave the ZX Spectrum version of this video game a score of 85 out of 100 (the equivalent to 85% or a B letter grade).

Kenny Dalglish Soccer Manager has been noted for its similarities with the 1982 video game Football Manager.
