= David Beckham Soccer =

2001 video game

- David Beckham Soccer PAL front cover (PS1 version)
- Developers: Rage Software; Yoyo Entertainment, Majesco (GBA and GBC versions)
- Publisher: Rage Software
- Composers: GBA; Jake Kaufman
- Platforms: PlayStation, PlayStation 2, Xbox, Game Boy Advance, Game Boy Color
- Release: PlayStation: EU: November 23, 2001; NA: June 2002; Game Boy Color: EU: February 8, 2002; PlayStation 2, Xbox: EU: June 7, 2002; Game Boy Advance: NA: October 7, 2002; EU: November 22, 2002
- Genre: Sports
- Modes: Single player, Multiplayer

David Beckham Soccer is a football video game for PlayStation, PlayStation 2 and Xbox, Game Boy Advance and Game Boy Color. All formats were developed and published by Rage Software, apart from the Game Boy versions which were developed by Majesco and Yoyo Entertainment.

== Reception ==
Reception

Aggregate score
| Aggregator | Score |
|---|---|
| Metacritic | 65/100 |

Review scores
| Publication | Score |
|---|---|
| GameSpot | 7.2/10 |
| GameZone | 4/10 |

The game received mixed reviews. IGN gave the Game Boy Advance version of the game a negative review, rating it 2.2 out of 10. IGN criticized the gameplay stating "The Artificial intelligence (AI) provides no challenge, the controls provide no depth, and the gameplay provides no fun" and the sound by saying it was "eerily silent".

The game would go on to be Rage Software's most successful boxed release in the UK.
