= International Superstar Soccer 2 =

2002 video game

- Cover art for PlayStation 2
- Developer: Konami
- Publisher: Konami
- Series: International Superstar Soccer
- Platforms: GameCube, Xbox, PlayStation 2
- Release: GameCube: JP: March 14, 2002; EU: May 3, 2002; Xbox: EU: May 10, 2002; JP: May 23, 2002; PlayStation 2: JP: May 16, 2002; EU: May 17, 2002
- Genre: Sports
- Modes: Single-player, multiplayer

International Superstar Soccer 2 is a football video game in the International Superstar Soccer series by Konami. Unlike other football games by Konami (but following the conventions of the International Superstar Soccer series until that point), it only features international teams. Initially being released on the GameCube, it became possible to play the game on a Wii also, introducing the game to a new generation of players, thanks to its universal retrocompatibility with GameCube games. The game continued the trend of having players with different attributes, both visually and with regard to their style on the pitch; pacey wingers out wide, large target men up front, shorter centre forwards trying to cause problems for defenders with their skill running on the ball.

The game was released in Japan as Jikkyō World Soccer 2002.

== Reception ==
Reception

Aggregate score
Aggregator	Score
GameRankings	(Xbox) 69.33% (GCN) 72.60%

Review score
Publication	Score
Nintendo World Report	7.5/10

On release, Famitsu magazine scored the GameCube version of Jikkyō World Soccer 2002 a 32 out of 40, and gave the PlayStation 2 version a 30 out of 40. Cubed3 gave the GameCube version a 7 out of 10, criticising poor AI on the highest level as well as removal of RPG feature and Scenario mode.
