= Champions World Class Soccer =

1994 video game

- Cover art (European Super NES)
- Developer: Park Place Productions
- Publisher: Acclaim Entertainment (Note: Released under the Flying Edge brand on the Genesis)
- Platforms: Sega Genesis; Super NES
- Release: Super NES: JP: March 25, 1994; NA: April 1994; EU: May 1994; Sega Genesis: NA: 1994; EU: May 19, 1994; JP: June 24, 1994
- Genre: Traditional soccer simulation
- Modes: Single-player; Multiplayer

Champions World Class Soccer (Note: Champions World Class Soccer (チャンピオンズ ワールドクラスサッカー)) is a football (soccer) video game released on the Sega Genesis and Super Nintendo Entertainment System in 1994, developed by Park Place Productions and published by Acclaim Entertainment.

== Background ==
The British, German and French releases featured pictures of Welsh international Ryan Giggs, Sepp Maier, and Paris Saint-Germain on the box respectively. Modes of play included in the game are Exhibition Match (one player or two players) and Tournament Mode. Progress through the tournament can be saved via a password given at the end of each match. There are also options to turn fouls and offsides on or off, as well as selecting the amount of time allowed for the match to be played in. There are 32 national teams in the game:

== Development ==
The game was first announced at CES 1993, under the working title of Acclaim's World Cup Soccer, where it was announced as being in development for the Sega Genesis and SNES in North America without a concrete release date.

If you set the games language to German, the translation for "PENALTY" (penalty shootout) will be "SCHEISSEN" (to shit), which is a spelling mistake of "SCHIESSEN" (to shoot), which, by itself, would have been a mistranslation, as the correct German term is „Elfmeterschießen“. It is likely the only case of an (albeit unintentionally used) expletive in a SNES game.

== Release and reception ==
Reception

Review score
Publication	Score
Famitsu	7/10, 7/10, 6/10, 4/10

Champions World Class Soccer was released in Japan for the Super Famicom on March 25, 1994.
