= LiberoGrande =

1997 video game

- PAL cover art of LiberoGrande
- Developer: Namco
- Publishers: JP: Namco; PAL: Sony Computer Entertainment
- Platforms: Arcade, PlayStation
- Release: Arcade; 1997; PlayStation: PAL: October 31, 1998; JP: November 26, 1998
- Genre: Sports
- Modes: Single-player, multiplayer
- Arcade system: Namco System 12

LiberoGrande is a 1997 association football video game developed and published by Namco for arcades. It was converted for the PlayStation in 1998.

A typical arcade football game in its nature, LiberoGrande introduced a novelty factor previously found in Namco's Top Striker for the Nintendo Entertainment System: the ability to play as just one player, instead of controlling the whole team, always swapping for players nearer the ball. This idea was later used by Konami in Winning Eleven / Pro Evolution Soccer titles in the Become a Legend mode, and by EA Sports in its various sports game franchises with the name Be a Pro.

== Gameplay ==
The player starts to choose one of the star players, and then a national team. Each star player, based on a real football player but with changed names, except for initials (Zinedine Zidane is Zenon Zadkine, for instance) is rated in both ball skill, speed and shooting abilities.

In addition to the original arcade mode, the home release adds an International mode (basically, the FIFA World Cup format), a league competition (up to eight star players/teams), which can be all human controlled and a skills mode where the player has to complete several training ground tasks such as hitting a target floating in the goal mouth or hitting an area from distance.

The player roster in the arcade version consists of: Note: Flags indicate national team as defined under FIFA eligibility rules; some limited exceptions apply. Players may hold more than one non-FIFA nationality.

No.	Pos.	Nation	Player
—		BRA	Raimundo
—		NED	Rudolf de Buys
—		ITA	Antonio Del Pacino
—		FRA	Zenon Zadkine
—		JPN	Naoki Hidaka
—		CMR	Philippe Empson
—		ENG	Alfred Shaffer
—		ARG	Gaston Balmaceda
—		COL	Cornelio Valencia
—		GER	Jordan Krüger
—		ITA	Raffaello Balbo
—		NED	Dirk Berlarge
—		GER	Oswald Bismarck
—		ITA	Patrizio Mazzini
—		BRA	Richard Castro
—		GER	Ajax Möbius

No.	Pos.	Nation	Player
—		ROU	Godwin Hasdeu
—		ESP	Renato Gallegos
—		CRO	Deron Slojacek
—		WAL	Robin Garrick
—		SRB	Dorman Smixolovic
—		ITA	Gregorio Zonaras (Hidden player)
—		USA	Arnold Lang (Hidden player)
—		BRA	Roland (Hidden player)
—		JPN	Minoru Kai (Hidden player)
—		FRA	Edgard Cailaux (Hidden player)
—		ENG	Powel Gardner (Hidden player)
—		LBR	Gerald Wells (Hidden player)
—		NED	Ruprech Goes (Hidden player)
—		ARG	David Magellan (Hidden player)
—		FRA	Maurice Poulenc (Hidden player)

There is a total of 48 national teams, but only 32 of them to choose from, depending on which version:

North America

- Canada^{a}
- Jamaica^{b}
- Mexico
- United States

South America

- Argentina
- Brazil
- Chile
- Colombia
- Paraguay^{ab}
- Uruguay^{a}

Africa

- Cameroon
- Morocco^{b}
- Nigeria
- South Africa^{b}
- Tunisia^{b}

Europe

- Austria
- Belgium
- Bulgaria^{bc}
- Croatia^{bc}
- Czech Republic^{a}
- Denmark
- England
- France
- Germany
- Greece^{a}
- Hungary^{c}
- Italy
- Netherlands
- Norway
- Poland^{c}
- Portugal
- Republic of Ireland^{ac}
- Romania^{bc}
- Russia^{c}
- Scotland^{bc}
- Spain
- Sweden^{ac}
- Switzerland^{c}
- Yugoslavia^{bc}

Asia

- Chinese Taipei^{a}
- Hong Kong^{a}
- Iran^{b}
- Japan
- Malaysia^{a}
- Saudi Arabia^{ab}
- South Korea

^{a} Only playable in the Arcade version
^{b} Only playable in the Japanese version
^{c} Only playable in the PAL version

A sequel, LiberoGrande 2 (known as LiberoGrande International in Europe) was released for PlayStation in Europe and Japan only, but with less success than the first title.

A playable demo of the game was included in Ridge Racer Turbo (Ridge Racer Hi-Spec in Europe), which was sold with Ridge Racer Type 4. The demo includes three players (Zenon Zadkine, Alfred Shaffer and Jordan Krüger) and three teams (England, France and Italy), which a person could use to play a ten-minute game.

== Reception ==
Reception

Aggregate score
Aggregator	Score
GameRankings	81%

Review score
Publication	Score
GameSpot	8.1/10

In Japan, Game Machine listed LiberoGrande on their February 15, 1998 issue as being the seventh most-successful arcade game of the month.
