= Viva Football =

1998 video game

- Developer(s): Crimson Studio
- Publisher(s): Virgin Interactive
- Platform(s): PlayStation, Windows
- Release: PAL: September 15, 1998; NA: September 1, 1999; JP: February 10, 2000
- Genre(s): Sports game
- Mode(s): Single-player, Multiplayer

Viva Football (known as Viva Soccer in North America, 20 Reiki Striker Retsuden in Japan and Absolute Football in France) is an association football video game released for the PlayStation and Windows. It was developed by Crimson Studio and published by Virgin Interactive.

== Gameplay ==
The game features every international team which played the FIFA World Cup and their qualifiers between the 1958 and the 1998 World Cups, a total of 1,035 teams and 16,544 real life players, including lists of starters, substitutes and national reserves for all teams. Players can choose from friendly mode which allows you to select any team and create your own matchups to play against the computer or a friend, or a History mode which allowed players to participate in any World Cup from 1958 to 1998 or to pit teams from any period against one another. They can also play in a Training mode to practise their skills. Players are also able to perform different goal celebrations when they score.

There was no commentary in the game, with the game instead featuring an 'PlayerChat audio engine' in which the players shout phrases such as "To me!" and "Through ball". The language of the players' speech can be altered in options which included the chance for the players to speak in their own native language.

== Development ==
Viva Football was Crimson's second game, after Pinocchio for the Super Nintendo and Mega Drive. The game spent two years in development and its title was chosen by Simon Swift, Lead Artist at Crimson, as a "celebration of world football". The data for the over 16,000 players was gathered over a period of "about 18 months" in collaboration between Crimson's lead researcher Nick de Palma and Gavin Hamilton, the editor of World Soccer Magazine.

Motion capture for the game was performed at Jim Henson's Creature Shop by members of Barnet's playing squad.

In an Edge interview Simon Humber of Virgin Interactive claimed that "Viva Football is more like real life soccer than any other game", pointing to its "open-ended game structure", contrasting with the "on-rails" gameplay of other titles like FIFA or ISS. Viva Football, by contrast, he said, had implemented a control method that focuses on kicking strength as much as direction, allowing for more varied approaches to play.

Humber added that over a year was spent developing the player AI:

"Originally we thought, 'why don't football games look like football games?' and then we realised it came down to the use of space. We started simulating some stuff which analyses space on the pitch and after a few weeks it fell into place...What goes on off the ball is just as important as what happens on it, which is gets missed in a lot of computer games. [In Viva Football] as you move everyone else makes run to complement what you're doing. They don't just react to what you're doing, they're proactive."

== Reception ==
Reception

Review scores
Publication	Score
CVG	4/5
The Independent	4/5
Official PlayStation Magazine (UK)	7/10
PC Zone	66%
PlayStation Pro	8.5/10
Total Control	73%

The game received largely positive reviews.

Steve Key of Computer and Video Games scored the title as 4/5, stating that it "makes it easy for you to pick up the basic controls and still leaves lots to learn with regards to trick moves and more complete controls". Sam Thomas of PlayStation Pro disagreed, describing the control system as "one of the trickiest ever" for a football game on the console, suggesting that it would prove challenging for new players, but added to the realism of the gameplay.

Giving the title 73% in Total Control Nick Jones praised the breadth of team options, the "intelligently-thought out" controls, but criticised the "old-fashioned graphics" arguing that the title looked a "little rough around the edges and doesn't compare favourably with ISS '98 or FIFA '99".

David Gordon of The Independent awarded the game a score of 4/5, pointing to the addictive nature of the gameplay and impressive graphics.

Writing for PC Zone Steve Hill argued that "Crimson have succeeded in recreating all the tedious parts of football: the misplaced passes, the numerous offsides, niggly challenges, aimless freekicks and wayward opportunities".
