= International Soccer (1988 video game) =

1988 video game

- Developer: Microdeal
- Publisher: Microdeal
- Platforms: Amiga, Atari ST
- Release: 1988
- Genre: Sports
- Modes: Single-player, multiplayer

International Soccer is a soccer video game developed by Microdeal for the Atari ST and Amiga in 1988.

== Gameplay ==
With the optional Microdeal 4 player adaptor, the game allowed 4 players to play (3 against the computer, or 2 against 2).
