= Football Manager 2022 =

2021 association football management simulation video game

- Developer(s): Sports Interactive
- Publisher(s): Sega
- Series: Football Manager
- Platform(s): Microsoft Windows, macOS, iOS, Android, Xbox One, Xbox Series X/S, Nintendo Switch
- Release: WW: 8 November 2021
- Genre(s): Sports management
- Mode(s): Single player, multiplayer

Football Manager 2022 is a football management simulation video game and the nineteenth instalment in the Football Manager series developed by Sports Interactive and published by Sega. It was released worldwide for Microsoft Windows and macOS on 8 November 2021. Football Manager 2022 Xbox Edition was released on Xbox Game Pass and Football Manager 2022 Mobile for iOS and Android on the same day.

The streamlined version of the game titled Football Manager 2022 Touch was released exclusively for Nintendo Switch on 8 November 2021. Players who pre-ordered Football Manager 2022 from select retailers received early access to a beta version of the game on 22 October 2021. Physical copies of Football Manager 2022 did not include discs and instead shipped with Steam activation codes.

== Features ==
Football Manager 2022 comes with a variety of new features including a revamp of the data system with the introduction of the Data Hub, which gives players information about match momentum, pass maps and the ability to request a data analyst to compile specific pieces of information. Additionally, as is common with each Football Manager edition, the match engine is tweaked. The new role of wide centre-back is added, which emulates the tactical style of Chelsea F.C. manager Thomas Tuchel. There is a new staff meeting system, with nearly 4,000 new dialogue options introduced, and the ability to explore a wider range of topics.

== Reception ==
Reception

Aggregate score
Aggregator	Score
Metacritic	85/100

Review scores
Publication	Score
Eurogamer	Recommended
Jeuxvideo.com	15/20
PC Gamer (US)	85/100
PCGamesN	9/10

Football Manager 2022 received "generally favorable" reviews according to Metacritic, a review aggregator. PC Gamer praised the game's addictiveness, writing: "If it were a team, Football Manager 2022 would be Liverpool. No big new signings, but there's already a star in every position ... If it were a player, it would be world-class, the kind of signing that excites the dourest of fan." Tapsell of Eurogamer praised the game's vast depth, stating: "It's not impossible, but in Football Manager 2022 it's definitely harder to survive at the top on nothing but vibes. And it's more blissful than ever to compulsively clean up my own club's mess." PCGamesN wrote positively, saying: "They really sum up what Football Manager 2022 is all about: small, cherry-picked revisions that address a number of long-term complaints, and improve some aspects I never knew I wanted." The game has made it to the top played game in Steam, being in the top 10 on the platform as of 4 January 2022.

== See also ==
- Business simulation game
