= Football Manager 2019 =

2018 association football management simulation video game

- Developer: Sports Interactive
- Publisher: Sega
- Series: Football Manager
- Platforms: Microsoft Windows, macOS, Nintendo Switch, iOS, Android
- Release: Windows, macOS, iOS, Android; WW: 2 November 2018; Nintendo Switch; EU: 27 November 2018; AU: 27 November 2018; NA: 6 December 2018
- Genre: Sports management
- Modes: Single player, multiplayer

Football Manager 2019 is a football management simulation video game and the sixteenth instalment in the Football Manager series developed by Sports Interactive and published by Sega. It was released worldwide for Microsoft Windows, macOS, Nintendo Switch, and mobile in November 2018.

== Gameplay ==
Football Manager 2019 features similar gameplay to that of the Football Manager series. Gameplay consists of taking charge of a professional football team (the game also includes semi-professional, amateur, and international teams) as the team manager. Players can sign football players to contracts, manage finances for the club, and give team talks to players. The Football Manager series is a simulation of real world management, with the player being judged on various factors by the club's AI owners and board.

In Football Manager 2019, the game features new expanded modes, featuring the addition of video assistant referees (VAR) in tournaments where it is used in the real world, such as the 2022 FIFA World Cup. It also features an overhaul to the existing training mechanic, allowing more in-depth training abilities. This version also features updated teams including as a first for the series the licence to the three Bundesliga divisions.

== Playable leagues ==
The game offers playable teams in 52 countries across five of the world's continents: Africa, Asia (including Australia), Europe, North America, and South America. Coverage is heavily slanted towards European teams, with 34 of its 51 countries having playable leagues, while South Africa is the only country of Africa's total 54 that is covered. 25 leagues across 12 countries were fully licensed for the game, as was KNVB (Team Holland). Notably, the Germany national football team was not included in the game.

== Release ==
On 6 August 2018, Sports Interactive released a trailer for the release of the game, which announced the game's release date as 2 November 2018. Although the series had a regular Linux edition since November 2013, Football Manager 2019 would not have a Linux release. A beta release of the game was made available on 21 October 2018. The Microsoft Windows and macOS versions were later released on 2 November 2018, and Football Manager 2019 Touch was released for Nintendo Switch on 27 November 2018 in Europe and Australia. A mobile and tablet version of the game entitled Football Manager Mobile 2019 was also released with the Microsoft Windows version on 2 November 2018.

== Reception ==
Reception

Aggregate score
Aggregator	Score
Metacritic	(PC) 86/100 (NS) 69/100

Review scores
Publication	Score
GameRevolution	9/10
GameSpot	8/10
GamesRadar+	4.5/5
Jeuxvideo.com	17/20
Nintendo Life	8/10 (Touch)
PC Gamer (US)	90/100
PCGamesN	9/10

Football Manager 2019 received "generally favorable" reviews while Football Manager 2019 Touch for Nintendo Switch received "mixed or average" reviews according Metacritic, a review aggregator. PC Gamer strongly praised the game for its improvement on previous entries, stating: "Football Manager returns with a kitbag full of new and overhauled features. It's the best at what it does, and FM 19 is the best it's ever been." GameSpot praised the manner in which the game provided the player with increased flexibility and command while criticising its lack of accessibility. PCGamesN wrote positively about the game's balance being great on launch, stating: "Sports Interactive has exposed more of the game's workings to players than ever. It feels both fresh and familiar at the same time, while being the best FM has ever played on day one." GamesRadar+ praised the game for its freshness, user interface, and accessibility while criticising it for its press conferences and match engine.

== See also ==
- Business simulation game
