= European Club Soccer =

1992 video game

- European cover art
- Developer: Krisalis Software
- Publishers: Virgin Games; Game Arts (Japanese version)
- Composer: Matt Furniss
- Platform: Mega Drive/Genesis
- Release: EU: August 1992; NA: 1992; JP: February 26, 1993
- Genre: Sports
- Modes: Single-player, multilayer

European Club Soccer (known as World Trophy Soccer in North America and J-League Champion Soccer (Jリーグチャンピオンサッカー) in Japan) is a 1992 association football video game developed by Krisalis Software and published by Virgin Games (Game Arts in Japan) for the Mega Drive/Genesis. Based on Manchester United Europe, it focuses on the European Champions Cup. The game was a best-seller in the UK charts for three months.

== Game modes and options ==
The game allows the player to play friendlies or the Champions' Cup. Options allow choosing game length (from 4 to 90 minutes), difficulty and player change control.

Kit design

European Club Soccer has dozens of teams from all across Europe (around 170), and each country is represented by at least two teams. In addition to correct club names, it also has recognizable imitations of team badges and kits; although more elaborate kits (such as those worn by Juventus, F.C. Porto or Celtic FC) are simplified (Juventus have a silver shirt, Porto light blue and Celtic light green, to make up for the white stripes in each of these). Player names, on the other hand, were made by mixing names found on real squads. Portuguese teams, for instance, had a large number of Yugoslavian players in the early 1990s, and that was reflected by players with names such as Valentim Ivic (of Valentim Loureiro and Tomislav Ivic, then Boavista FC chairman and S.L. Benfica manager, respectively). Names could not be changed, and since the game lacked a battery, it does not store changes done to kits and passwords were used to resume tournaments. Rotherham United are included amongst the English clubs despite never playing in the top tier of English football due to Krisalis Software being based in Rotherham. All other clubs have played in their own country's top tier.

== Gameplay ==
Gameplay is simple, and works only with two of the buttons of the gamepad – "B" is used to pass the ball low, and "C" to lob the ball. While a button to shoot is absent, if a button is held pressed, when released the ball goes at a much higher speed. The directional button can also be used to give the aftertouch to lobbed balls and change direction or touching the ball backwards with the heel in low passes. Optionally, the "A" button can be used to swap to the nearest player, if the automatic option is disabled.

The game puts several tactics at the disposal of the player, while the computer has a predefined tactic for each team. Each tactic has its own advantage: the 4–3–3 tactic using a sweeper is the only one that allows a player to recover if the goalkeeper is beaten and 4–4–2 allows midfield control from the wings, for instance.

== Alternate versions ==
While European Club Soccer was only released for the European market, the Japanese market received J-League Champion Soccer, and North America yielded World Trophy Soccer. The Japanese port, as the name points out, is based on a league system with J-League teams. The North American version replaced European clubs with worldwide national teams, but with a much more limited selection. The winning screens on both games feature a player and a goalkeeper raising the champions cup, which indicates the original title.
