= Total Football (video game) =

1995 video game

- Developer: Domark
- Publisher: Domark
- Platforms: Sega Mega Drive, Amiga
- Release: Mega Drive: PAL: October 20, 1995
- Genre: Sport
- Modes: Single-player, multiplayer

Total Football is a football (soccer) videogame developed for the Sega Mega Drive and Amiga programmed and published by Domark in 1995.
