= World Cup USA '94 =

1994 video game

- European Mega Drive cover
- Developer: Tiertex
- Publisher: U.S. Gold
- Series: FIFA World Cup
- Platforms: Genesis, Sega CD, Super NES, Master System, MS-DOS, Amiga, Game Gear, Game Boy
- Release: EU: June 3, 1994; NA: 1994
- Genre: Sports
- Modes: Single-player, multiplayer

World Cup USA '94 is an association football video game developed by Tiertex and published by U.S. Gold in 1994. It was released for Genesis, Sega CD, Super NES, Master System, MS-DOS, Game Boy, Commodore Amiga and Game Gear. The game gives official groups, teams, and the fidelity schedule of the championship. The MS-DOS and Sega CD versions have digitized stadium photos. The Genesis version carries the PolyGram Video logo across the stadium advertisement boards in the game. The Genesis version was also the first console game to support a 16:9 widescreen mode.

This was the last official FIFA World Cup franchise game before Electronic Arts acquired the rights in 1996 for the FIFA Soccer series and the first official FIFA World Cup franchise game to feature non-qualified teams.

== Gameplay ==
The game is viewed from a bird's eye-view perspective. Game time may be customised from as short as a minute per half to the full regular 45 minutes. A coin toss is determined by the 'home' team and play will commence. Depending on the options set before the match, the gamer may opt to have less dribble control (resulting in the game ball sliding in the direction of the player movement); manual goalkeeper control which puts the player in control of all goalkeeper saves and kicks; ball-trapping, of which the player will not be able to shield the ball and allows opponents to snatch it away without necessitating a tackle; and no pass-back rule which was implemented during World Cup '94 where a keeper may not pick up the ball whenever an outfield player passes it back to him.

If the gamer opts for manual goalkeeper control, the player would have to make a save by guessing where the opponent will place the ball and jumping into the general direction with any of the console buttons and the directional keys if applicable. Similarly, outfield players have the option to either pass the ball, kick it (when attempting to score a goal) or attempt a lob. Freekicks may also be executed using any of the above. However, a penalty kick is done in a different game screen similar to that of World Cup 98 (video game) and where a hovering indicator swings from side to side to indicate the direction of the shot.

Basic tactics (or preset tactics) can also be customised prior to the game and may be changed in-game. Team rosters, while not based on real-life players, have variable attributes amongst its players and divided into three major skills which are speed, dribble control and shooting accuracy. Goalkeepers do not have a separate skill evaluation method and can be picked from normal players.

== Reception ==
Reception

Review score
Publication	Score
Mean Machines Sega	67% (GEN)

GamePro praised the SNES version's controls, sound effects, and "amazing range of options", though they criticized the graphics. Reviewing the Genesis version for Mean Machines Sega, Steve Merrett felt that the game is "completely outplayed by the likes of Sensi and FIFA", while Angus Swan criticized the game's presentation for "[m]inuscule sprites, minimal animation and zeroid atmosphere."

In Spain, World Cup USA '94 appeared in Hobby Consolas magazine's monthly popularity rankings across several platforms. The Mega Drive version ranked sixth in June 1994 and fourth in both August and September. The Mega-CD version placed fifth in September and fourth in October and December 1994. The Master System version also maintained a presence in the magazine's rankings, placing fifth in June and August 1994, sixth in September and October, and seventh in December.
