= International Soccer =

1983 video game

- Developer: Andrew Spencer
- Publisher: Commodore
- Platform: Commodore 64
- Release: 1983
- Genre: Sports
- Modes: Single-player, multiplayer

International Soccer, also known as International Football, is a sports video game written by Andrew Spencer for the Commodore 64 and published by Commodore International in 1983. Originally only available on cartridge, CRL re-released the game on cassette and disc in 1988.

== Gameplay ==
International Soccer can be played by two players or one player against an AI opponent. Each team can select one of a number of colored shirts, and the AI opponent is graded into 9 different difficulty levels. The game itself is a relatively simple game of soccer; there is no offside rule and no possibility to foul opponents.

Each game is divided into two 200-second halves. There are no overtimes or shootouts. There are also six colors a person can choose from for play: red, yellow, blue, grey, white, and orange. The winning team is presented a gold trophy after the game by a dark-haired woman.

The game includes a gray-scale mode that is more suited for black-and-white television sets.

== Reception ==
International Soccer was well received, gaining a Certificate of Merit in the category of "1984 Best Computer Sports Game" at the 5th annual Arkie Awards. InfoWorld described International Soccer as Commodore's best competitor to the very successful Atarisoft games. The magazine wrote that the "minimasterpiece" was "surprisingly good, considering it's published by Commodore" (because "the normal standard for Commodore software is mediocrity"), praising gameplay and especially animation. Ahoy! wrote that International Soccer "is a pure action game, but, oh, what action!", praising the graphics and game-play.

In the UK, the game reached the number one position in the Commodore 64 charts early in 1984 and returned to the top of the charts again later in the same year.

== Legacy ==
International Soccer was the inspiration for Match Day on the ZX Spectrum.

Andrew Spencer followed up International Soccer with International Basketball which was based on the same code. It reached number 2 in the UK Commodore 64 charts in April 1985 but was not released in the US. Spencer would later work with Epyx, adapting his sprite coding technique for use on their 1987 game Street Sports Basketball.
