= Ultimate Soccer =

1993 video game

- Developer: Rage Software
- Publisher: Sega
- Platforms: Mega Drive, Game Gear, Master System
- Release: Master System; EU: August 1993; Mega Drive; EU: October 8, 1993; Game Gear; EU: 1993
- Genre: Sports (soccer/football)
- Mode: from 1 to 8 players

Ultimate Soccer is a 1993 soccer video game by Rage Software released for the Mega Drive, Master System, and Game Gear by request of Sega which even allowed their mascot, Sonic, to be featured in the game menus. It was followed by Striker also for the Mega Drive, Striker '96, released for MS-DOS, Sega Saturn, and PlayStation, and Striker Pro 2000, released for PlayStation and the Dreamcast. While never published to the Super Nintendo Entertainment System, Rage developed other games for the Nintendo console, including Elite Soccer, Manchester United Championship Soccer (also had version named after Eric Cantona and Lothar Matthäus) and World Soccer 94 – Road to Glory.

Focused on national teams (with a total of 64, all with fake names and individual team values), it had one of the highest option counts for 16-bit football games. Up to 18 different settings can be changed, including ball weight, weather, surface, tightness of ball control, passback rule and perhaps the most remembered of all, the ability to play 6-on-6 indoor football. Several game modes are available, including friendlies, penalty shootout, Ultimate League, Ultimate Cup (group phase and knockout stage) and Knockout. However, the game lacks both passwords and battery save, and all competitions must be completed in one sitting. Up to eight players can play if two 4-player adapters are used.

Ultimate Soccer is played in a field of vision similar to the Madden NFL games in the console, a second-row view behind the players' shoulders that can also be tilted to show more field depth or more detail closer to the bottom of the screen. Player sprites, while small, are well animated and with small details such as dirt or water splashing from the players' feet (which would become one of the trademark effects in Sega's own Worldwide Soccer).

== Gameplay ==
Gameplay depends on how versions are tweaked. Lighter balls travel further and higher and can be given zig-zag aftertouches (perfect from long range shots), but on the other hand, are more prone to be deflected by strong winds. Heavy balls barely lift from the floor which makes them more suitable for short passing, but are affected by wet grass. It is possible to score from any situation, including direct corners and freekicks, head deflections from long passes, bicycle kicks, working around the goalkeeper or pressing the defense and tackling the ball in.

== Reception ==
Reception

Review scores
Publication	Score		
Publication	Game Gear	Master System	Sega Genesis
Computer and Video Games		12%	86/100
Joypad	68/100		
