= Red heat (disambiguation) =

Red heat is a practice of using colours to determine the temperature of metal

Red Heat may also refer to:

- Red Heat (1985 film), a 1985 film starring Linda Blair
- Red Heat (1988 film), a 1988 film starring Arnold Schwarzenegger and James Belushi
  - Red Heat (video game), a 1989 video game based on the film
- Red Heat: Conspiracy, Murder, and the Cold War in the Caribbean, a 2010 history book by Alex von Tunzelmann
- Red Heat, a 2000 album by American jazz bassist Jimmy Haslip

== See also ==
- Red hot (disambiguation)
