= Special FX Software =

Former British video game developer

- Type: Private
- Industry: Video games
- Founded: September 1987; 39 years ago
- Founder: Paul Finnegan; Jonathan Smith
- Defunct: 1992
- Successor: Rage Software
- Headquarters: Liverpool, England, UK

Special FX Software is a British video game developer that was formed in 1987 by Ocean Software executives Paul Finnegan and Jonathan Smith. The company went defunct in 1992, and it was succeeded by Rage Software.

== History ==
=== Early years and original titles ===
The company was originally founded in Liverpoool 1987 by former Imagine Software and Ocean Software executive Paul Finnegan and programmer Jonathan Smith. The first game they developed was Hysteria, for Software Projects, for the Commodore 64 and ZX Spectrum.

In 1988, the company signed a deal with Ocean Software to handle publishing, sales, marketing and distribution of the company's future video game titles. The first title to come out of the deal was Firefly, which was a shoot-em-up game that also received critical acclaim. The company followed it up with G.U.T.Z, which was another shooter. Special FX was planning to develop another shooting game, Vertigo, but this never emerged.

=== Shift to licensed titles ===
The company moved its focus to licensed titles beginning with the hit title Batman: The Caped Crusader, which was a critical and commercial success, and also the company's first game for 16-bit platforms.

The company followed it up with titles based on movies The Untouchables and Red Heat. Red Heat met with a positive reception from computer game critics. Their next title The Untouchables, for 16-bit computers, was also met with positive reviews.

The company then expanded its focus onto porting arcade hits. Cabal, was released in 1989 for 8-bit computers and Midnight Resistance, which was released in 1990 to favourable reviews, The company was largely responsible for creating the 16-bit computer versions of the RoboCop 2 video game, which was also well received.

=== Final years, closure and renaming ===
The company tried to move into NES games production in 1991 with the game The Untouchables, followed by the video game tie-in for Hudson Hawk for Ocean Software, for all major computers, NES and Game Boy, which was met by a mixed response from contemporary video game critics,.

After the completion of Hudson Hawk, the Special FX team split up. Members, like programmer Robert Tinman and music composer Keith Tinman relocated from Liverpool to Ocean's Manchester base to finish the game titles, the NES game The Legend of Prince Valiant and the Game Boy version of Mr. Do!, the latter which was released in an incomplete state, while the rest of the team stayed in Liverpool, while Special FX became an independent publisher in late 1991/early 1992, and the company was renamed to Rage Software, to produce the video game Striker, which met with critical acclaim.

== List of games developed ==
Title	Release date	Publisher	Platforms
Hysteria	1987	Software Projects	Commodore 64, ZX Spectrum
Firefly	1988	Ocean Software	Commodore 64, ZX Spectrum
G.U.T.Z.	1988	Ocean Software	Commodore 64, ZX Spectrum
Hyper Active	1988	EMAP	Commodore 64, ZX Spectrum
Batman: The Caped Crusader	1988	Ocean Software	Amiga, Amstrad CPC, Atari ST, Commodore 64, MS-DOS, ZX Spectrum
Recoil	1989	Dennis Publishing	Atari ST
Red Heat	1989	Ocean Software	Amiga, Amstrad CPC, Atari ST, Commodore 64, ZX Spectrum
The Untouchables	1989	Ocean Software	Amiga, Atari ST, NES
Cabal	1989	Ocean Software	Amstrad CPC, Commodore 64, ZX Spectrum
Midnight Resistance	1990	Ocean Software	ZX Spectrum, Amstrad CPC, Commodore 64, Amiga, Atari ST
RoboCop 2	1990	Ocean Software	Amiga, Atari ST
Hudson Hawk	1991	Ocean Software	Amiga, Amstrad CPC, Atari ST, Commodore 64, Game Boy, NES, ZX Spectrum
The Legend of Prince Valiant	1992	Ocean Software	NES
Mr. Do!	1992	Ocean Software	Game Boy
