= Red hot =

Red hot may refer to:

== Food ==
- Frank's RedHot, a hot sauce produced by Reckitt Benckiser
- Michigan hot dog, covered in a meat sauce
- Red Hots, a small cinnamon-flavored candy

== Film and television ==
- Red Hot (film), a 1993 Canadian drama film directed by Paul Haggis
- Red Hot TV (Canada), a pornographic television network in Canada
- Red Hot TV (UK), a softcore pornographic pay-per-view UK television network
- Red Hot (Transformers), a fictional character, member of the Micromasters

== Music ==
- "Red Hot" (song), a 1955 song by Billy "The Kid" Emerson
- "Red Hot" (Debbie Gibson song)
- Red Hot (album), a 2004 album by RuPaul
- "Red Hot (Black & Blue)", a song by Kix from their album Midnite Dynamite
- "Red Hot", a 1995 composition by Vanessa-Mae
- "Red Hot", a song by Mötley Crüe from their album Shout at the Devil

== Other ==
- Hot enough to glow red; at red heat
- Red Hot Organization, an international organization that works on AIDS awareness

== See also ==
- Red Heat (disambiguation)
