= Jonathan Smith (games programmer) =

British video game programmer (1967–2010)

Jonathan M. "Joffa" Smith (1 February 1967 – 26 June 2010) was a British games programmer, best known for his titles for the ZX Spectrum. His games were notable for containing a large number of sprites and parallax scrolling.

His most notable games include Cobra, (which was a license extremely loosely based on the Sylvester Stallone film) one of the first Spectrum games to exhibit full-colour parallax scrolling and his conversion of the arcade game Green Beret. A notable "trademark" of Smith's was his habit of writing his name (with "Jonathan" and "Smith" spelled various ways) as a mirror-image in his games.

Smith also created the computer displays for the British science fiction comedy series Red Dwarf using an Atari ST.

== Notable releases ==
Title	Developer	Publisher	Year	Platform
Kong Strikes Back!	Ocean Software	Ocean Software	1984	ZX Spectrum
Pud Pud	Ocean Software	Ocean Software	1984	ZX Spectrum
Hyper Sports	Ocean Software	Ocean Software	1985	ZX Spectrum
Daley Thompson's Supertest	Ocean Software	Ocean Software	1985	ZX Spectrum
Street Hawk	Ocean Software	Ocean Software	1985	ZX Spectrum
Mikie	Ocean Software	Ocean Software	1986	ZX Spectrum
Green Beret	Ocean Software	Ocean Software	1986	ZX Spectrum
Cobra	Ocean Software	Ocean Software	1986	ZX Spectrum
Terra Cresta	Ocean Software	Ocean Software	1986	ZX Spectrum
Hysteria	Special FX Software	Software Projects	1987	ZX Spectrum
Firefly	Special FX Software	Ocean Software	1988	ZX Spectrum
Hyper Active	Special FX Software	Sinclair User	1988	ZX Spectrum
Batman: The Caped Crusader	Special FX Software	Ocean Software	1988	ZX Spectrum
Recoil	Special FX Software	Ocean Software	1989	Atari ST
Red Heat	Special FX Software	Ocean Software	1989–90	Amiga Atari ST
Midnight Resistance	Special FX Software	Ocean Software	1990	Atari ST
Hudson Hawk	Special FX Software	Ocean Software	1991	Atari ST
Spider-Man/X-Men: Arcade's Revenge	Software Creations	Acclaim Entertainment	1992	SNES
Power Drive	Rage Software	US Gold	1994	Sega Genesis
Airlock	Rage Software	Orange Multimedia	2000	WAP
Apprentise aka Fluffy	Software Creations	unfinished and unpublished	2001	Game Boy Advance
Ripping Friends	Software Creations	THQ	2002	Game Boy Advance
Looney Tunes Back in Action	Warthog Games	Electronic Arts	2003	Game Boy Advance
All Star Baseball 2004	Acclaim Studios Manchester	Acclaim Entertainment	2004	Game Boy Advance
Momma Can I Mow The Lawn?	Gizmondo Studios	Gizmondo Studios	2005	Gizmondo
Saucer	Shorten Suite Software	unfinished and unpublished	2006	ZX Spectrum
Retaliot	Video Hazard	Video Hazard	2009	MSX
Cluster Bluster	?	?	?	SNES
