= Agent provocateur (disambiguation) =

An agent provocateur is a person employed to act undercover to entice or provoke another person to commit an illegal or rash act.

Agent provocateur or provocateur may also refer to:

- Agent Provocateur (album), by Foreigner
- Agent Provocateur (band), British electronica group
- Agent Provocateur (lingerie), British lingerie brand
- Provocateur (film) or Agent Provocateur, 1998 film directed by Jim Donovan
- Provocateur (TV series), 2017 Hong Kong television drama
- The Provocateur, 2025 EP by Adéla

== See also ==
- Provocator, a shoot 'em up computer game
