= Network 23 =

Network 23 may refer to:

- Network 23 (record label), a defunct Czech record label
- Network 23 (company), a defunct British video game development company
- Network 23, a fictional television network on the TV series Max Headroom
- "Network 23", a song by Tangerine Dream from their album Exit
