= Striker (video game) =

- Amiga box art
- Developer: Rage Software
- Publisher: Rage Software
- Programmer: George Christophorou
- Artists: Andy Rixon; Karen Davies
- Composer: Allister Brimble (SNES)
- Platforms: Amiga, Atari ST, Amiga CD32, Mega Drive, MS-DOS, Super NES
- Release: 1992
- Genre: Sports (soccer)
- Modes: Single-player, multiplayer

Striker is a soccer video game series first released by Rage Software in 1992. The game was released for the Amiga, Amiga CD32, Atari ST, PC, Mega Drive, and Super Nintendo Entertainment System. It was bundled in one of the Amiga 1200 launch packs. It was one of the first soccer games to feature a 3D viewpoint, after Simulmondo's I Play 3D Soccer.

In 1993 it was released in Japan by Coconuts Japan for the Super Famicom as World Soccer (ワールドサッカー, Wārudo Sakkā), while the French Super NES version of Striker is known as Eric Cantona Football Challenge, playing on the popularity of French forward Eric Cantona, while the North American Super NES release of Striker was known as World Soccer '94: Road to Glory.

== Development ==
The game was envisioned when Special FX Software and Ocean Software parted ways. Special FX became an independent game publisher, which was renamed during game production to Rage Software before it was released.

== Critical reaction ==
The game received a mixed reaction from the gaming press, with some condemning and others praising its extreme speed. For example, CU Amiga Magazine awarded the game 94% in its June 1992 issue along with the CU Amiga Screenstar award, while German magazine Amiga Joker awards the game 64% in the September 1992 edition.

By 1995, Striker sold 700,000 copies.

== Ports/sequels ==
=== Ports ===
Striker was ported to several consoles between 1992 and 1999.

==== World Soccer '94: Road to Glory (SNES) ====
The Super NES port World Soccer '94: Road to Glory, known as Striker in Europe, Eric Cantona Football Challenge in France and World Soccer in Japan) was released in North America by Atlus Software, in Europe directly by Rage Software and in Japan by Coconuts.

The game lets the player choose from five different modes, including indoor soccer, and then pick from 128 different international teams, all with different strengths and weaknesses. Unlike in the original game where the strongest or the most well-known teams had real names, in World Soccer '94: Road to Glory all the footballers' names are fictitious. Every UEFA (Europe) CAF (Africa) CONCACAF (North America Central America The & Caribbean) AFC (Asia) OFC (Oceania) team of that time appears in the game except for Yugoslavia, which was banned from international competition from 1992 to 1994 for being at war with itself. World Soccer '94: Road to Glory doesn't have a language-select prompt at the opening screen.

There are many options and features, for example, the pitch surface changes field conditions in outdoor friendlies; wet surfaces are slower than drier ones. Wind Strength can affect the flight of the ball, new FIFA Rules affects whether or not extra time will use the "Golden Goal" (sudden death) rules - since abolished. Auto Keeper will, when turned on, make the goalkeeper kick the ball upfield automatically after saved shots on target. After saves, the goalkeeper takes control automatically unless "Auto Keeper" is turned OFF.

==== List of ports ====
Year	Title	System	Developer	Publisher	Region
1992	Striker	Amiga	Rage Software	Rage Software	PAL
1992	Striker	Atari ST	Rage Software	Rage Software	PAL
1992	Striker	Super NES	Rage Software	Elite System	PAL
1993	Ultimate Soccer	Game Gear	Rage Software	Sega	PAL, Japan
1993	World Soccer '94: Road to Glory	Super NES	Rage Software	Atlus	NTSC
1993	World Soccer	Super Famicom	Rage Software	Coconuts	Japan
1993	Ultimate Soccer	Master System	Rage Software	Sega	PAL
1993	Ultimate Soccer	Mega Drive	Rage Software	Sega	PAL
1993	Striker	DOS	Rage Software	Rage Software	PAL
1993	Eric Cantona Football Challenge	Super NES	Rage Software	Rage Software	PAL (France only)
1994	Striker	Amiga CD32	Rage Software	GBH Gold	PAL
1995	Striker	Game Gear	Rage Software	Sega	PAL
1995	Striker	Mega Drive	Rage Software	Sega	PAL
1995	Striker '95	DOS	Rage Software	Time Warner Interactive	PAL
1996	Striker '96	Sega Saturn / PlayStation / MS-DOS	Rage Software	Acclaim	PAL
1999	UEFA Striker/Striker Pro 2000	PlayStation, Dreamcast	Rage Software	Infogrames	NTSC, PAL

=== Sequels ===
A sequel, World Cup Striker (known in North America as Elite Soccer), was released for the Super NES in 1994. It was essentially a repackaged version of Striker, but featuring slight improvements. It was published in Japan by Coconuts Japan and in Europe by Elite.

A Game Boy game developed by Denton Designs was also released at the same time, in Europe it was released as Soccer, in North America as Elite Soccer (both published by GameTek), and in Japan as World Cup Striker (published by Coconuts Japan and endorsed by Yasutaro Matsuki).in 1994.

Also, Striker Pro was released in Europe and North America for the CD-i. In 1995, Striker: World Cup Special was released for the 3DO. A version of Striker '95 was in development for the Atari Jaguar but never released. An entry in the Striker franchise was in the works for the Panasonic M2 but it never happened due to the system's cancellation.

A year later Striker '96 (known in Japan as Striker: World Cup Premiere Stage) was released for the PlayStation, Sega Saturn and MS-DOS. Striker '96 is known for being the first soccer game on the original PlayStation.

In 1999 UEFA Striker, known in North America as Striker Pro 2000, was released for the Dreamcast and PlayStation.

A follow-up, UEFA 2001, was announced for the Dreamcast in 2000, but was cancelled in October when Infogrames was re-evaluating their Dreamcast support, and the game was never released on any platform.

== See also ==
- Microsoft International Soccer 2000, developed by Rage Software after UEFA Striker
