= Dead Ball Zone =

1998 video game

- Developer: Rage Games
- Publisher: GT Interactive
- Platform: PlayStation
- Release: June 1998
- Genres: Action, Sports

Dead Ball Zone is a 1998 video game developed by Rage Games and published by GT Interactive. An identical PC version was released under the alternative name, Savage Arena.

== Gameplay ==
Dead Ball Zone imagines a brutal sport born from a ruined world. Two teams of eight clash in a pit where the only objective is to drive the ball into the opponent's goal. Everything else is chaos: bone-crunching tackles, weapons, insults, and dismemberment are all part of the match. The game blends the savage spectacle of ancient gladiatorial combat with the tactical flow of rugby, creating a contest where survival is as important as scoring. Victorious players earn prize money to heal injuries and strengthen their veterans, since no mercy exists in this future. The arenas and customizable athletes allow players to shape their squad's abilities—shooting, throwing, catching, speed, strength, agility, and mentality—while equipping them with an arsenal of fifteen weapons. Each character can perform twenty distinct actions, ensuring that every match is a violent, strategic struggle where the path to victory is paved with both skill and brutality.

== Development ==
The game was in development since 1996.

== Reception ==
Reception

Review scores
Publication	Score
All Game Guide	2/5
Absolute PlayStation	7.4/10
Computer and Video Games	4/5
Extreme Playstation	91/100

Absolute PlayStation rated the game a 7.4 of 10 stating that "It's difficult to imagine what type of audience Dead Ball Zone is being aimed at. The fighting is basically a few over-the-top tackles and the sport is a combination of handball/basketball and football."

== Sales ==
According to GT Interactive, the game had strong sales.
