= Gun Metal (video game) =

2002 video game

- Developer: Rage Games
- Publishers: Xbox: EU: Rage Games; NA: Majesco; Windows: EU: Zoo Digital; NA: Strategy First
- Producer: Phil Wilson
- Designer: Phil Wilson
- Programmer: Mark Featherstone
- Artist: Nick Tipping
- Composers: Stephen Lord; Andrew Diey; Darren Lambourne
- Platforms: Xbox, Windows
- Release: Xbox: EU: June 28, 2002; NA: August 1, 2002; Windows: EU: September 19, 2003; NA: May 26, 2005
- Genres: Shooting, flight simulator
- Mode: Single-player

Gun Metal is a 2002 shooting video game for the Xbox and Microsoft Windows where the player takes control of a transformable prototype combat vehicle. It was developed by the now defunct Rage Games.

== Story ==
The setting revolves around a war (sometime in the future) on a planet called Helios, where humans have settled. Enemy spacecraft have followed them from Earth and are attempting to exterminate the colony. Project Gunmetal is a massive operation which oversaw the creation of a supremely powerful war machine. In its primary form, a walking "humanoid" mech many dozens of feet high, it possesses a range of 24 weapons and an electronic shield. At the push of a button, it transforms into an advanced fighter jet (reminiscent of a modern fighter jet).

== Gameplay ==
Gun Metal allows players to pilot a futuristic mech (named the Havoc Suit) which can transform into a plane (the Havoc Jet). The mech (and plane) can use various weapons in their loadout, about 4 can be used for both the mech and plane independently (8 in total). It possesses a total of 24 weapons to use, ranging from napalm, pulse cannons, harpoons and rockets.

Gun Metal contains 14 missions, each with various objectives that must be completed in order to advance. As the player progresses through the game, additional weapons are unlocked, allowing for multiple loadout options, thus providing more replayability and alternative combat engagement.

== Reception ==
Reception

Aggregate score
Aggregator	Score
Metacritic	63/100

Review scores
Publication	Score
AllGame	3.5/5
Edge	6/10
Electronic Gaming Monthly	5/10
Game Informer	6/10
GamePro	4/5
GameSpot	6.4/10
GameZone	6.8/10
IGN	6.7/10
Official Xbox Magazine (US)	7.9/10
X-Play	2/5

The Xbox version received "mixed" reviews according to the review aggregation website Metacritic.
