= Kong Strikes Back! =

1984 video game

- ZX Spectrum cover art
- Developer: Ocean Software
- Publisher: Ocean Software
- Producer: Jon Woods
- Programmers: N. Alderton; J. M. Smith
- Platforms: Amstrad CPC, Commodore 64, ZX Spectrum
- Release: EU: November 1984
- Genre: Platform
- Mode: Single-player

Kong Strikes Back! is a 1984 platform video game published by Ocean Software in 1984 for the Amstrad CPC, Commodore 64 and ZX Spectrum. While its predecessor, Kong, is a Donkey Kong clone, Kong Strikes Back! is a clone of Mr. Do's Wild Ride with Donkey Kong-inspired graphics.

== Gameplay ==
The player must rescue a damsel in distress on a rollercoaster in a fairground, and the goal of each level is to reach the top of the level to save her from Kong, a large ape. The player must avoid rollercoaster carts and various hazards by climbing up ladders on the track, and then climbing down and continuing up the track after the hazards pass.

== Development ==
Kong Strikes Back!'s graphics are inspired by Donkey Kong, while its gameplay is a clone of Mr. Do's Wild Ride. Kong Strikes Back! was released in the EU in mid-November 1984, and TV advertisements for the game aired around Christmas 1985. To promote the release of Kong Strikes Back!, Ocean ran a caption contest in Home Computing Weekly, with the winners receiving a copy of either the Commodore 64 or the ZX Spectrum version of the game.

Kong Strikes Back! appears on both the ZX Spectrum and Commodore 64 versions of the 1986 video game compilation Off the Hook, which donated all proceeds to the charity The Prince's Trust to help fight drug abuse.

Kong Strikes Back! is one of the first games with music composed by Martin Galway.

== Reception ==
Reception

Review scores
Publication	Score
Amstrad Action	83% (Amstrad)
Home Computing Weekly	4/5
Crash	73% (Spectrum)
Sinclair Programs	65% (Spectrum)

Amstrad Action gave the Amstrad CPC version of Kong Strikes Back! an overall score of 83%, praising its "slick" graphics, "great" music, and "intense" action gameplay. Crash gave the ZX Spectrum version an overall score of 73%, criticizing the lack of a backstory for the game, further expressing that the game's graphics are "old fashioned" and "quite plain", particularly criticizing the damsel's "ugly" sprite. Crash praised the game's difficulty curve, as well as its "fast" movement and 'intuitive' controls, further calling Kong Strikes Back! "definitely above average".

Sinclair Programs gave the ZX Spectrum version an overall score of 65%, praising its "addictive" gameplay as well as its difficulty, further calling Kong Strikes Back! a "well-thought out and immaculately constructed" game. Home Computing Weekly gave the Commodore 64 version four stars out of five.
