= Trash It =

1997 video game

- Developer(s): Rage Software
- Publisher(s): GT Interactive
- Platform(s): MS-DOS, PlayStation, Saturn
- Release: PAL: July 10, 1997
- Genre(s): Puzzle-platform
- Mode(s): Single-player, multiplayer

Trash It is a puzzle-platform game developed by Rage Software and published by GT Interactive in July 1997. It was released in PAL territories only for MS-DOS, PlayStation, and Sega Saturn.

== Gameplay ==
Players play as construction worker Jack Hammer, who is aiming to defeat Doctor Moonbeam in his bid to "turn the world into a sugar lump to put in his cup of tea". Players use Jack's large hammer to destroy the buildings of Timmy World under a time limit, gaining Timmy Points by hoovering up the Timmies released from destroyed structures to purchase weapon upgrades in the Hammer Shop. The game includes Quest, Battle and Arcade modes, the last of which supports up to four players.

== Reception ==
The game received a poor critical reception. Iain White of Saturn Power magazine gave a score of 51%, describing the title as "slow-moving, badly designed and utterly utterly tedious" and decrying its "blocky looking graphics". Sega Saturn Magazine's Gary Cutlack was even more damning, offering a score of 39%, opining that while the concept sounds fun, the game is extremely boring to play due to the "samey and uninspired" levels and elements which slow the action, such as that the player character can only run if he puts away his hammer first. He also criticised the "very rough, very brown, very dull" graphics and suggested that the publisher's failure to send Sega Saturn Magazine a review copy showed a lack of confidence in the game.

Reviewing the PlayStation release, Play's Tom Sargent labelled Trash It an "unusual puzzle-come-platform game" that "plays too sluggishly and becomes repetitive far too soon...a 16-bit game at a 32-bit price".
