= Pud Pud in Weird World =

1985 video game

- Developer: Jonathan Smith
- Publisher: Ocean Software
- Platform: ZX Spectrum
- Release: 1985
- Genres: Action, Maze game
- Mode: Single-player

Pud Pud in Weird World (also known simply as Pud Pud) is a computer game published by Ocean Software in 1985 for the ZX Spectrum. It was written by Jonathan Smith. Smith was paid £1000 for Pud Pud by Ocean Software and was given a job at Ocean as a direct result of the game.

== Plot ==
Pud Pud is trapped in Weird World and needs to escape. He must explore Weird World looking for ten puddings and avoiding the deadly kiss of Mrs Pud Pud.

== Gameplay ==
The player controls Pud Pud (who resembles a round pudding with wings or feet depending on whether he's walking or flying) and must explore the mazelike Weird World. Pud Pud has a limited amount of energy which needs to be topped up by eating certain creatures that live in Weird World although other creatures, which drain his energy if eaten, must be avoided. If Pud Pud runs out of energy he loses one of his three lives.

Mrs Pud Pud occasionally appears on the screen and is similar to Pud Pud, but white and wearing high heels. If she touches Pud Pud he loses a life instantly, regardless of his energy status although the player will receive a bonus score based on how much energy was remaining when Mrs Pud Pud delivered her kiss.

Pud Pud can obtain an extra life by collecting all ten hidden puddings.

The puddings are spread randomly throughout the maze with only one being in the maze at a time. When all ten are collected, Pud Pud can escape Weird World.

== Reception ==
Reception

Review scores
Publication	Score
Crash	75%
Your Sinclair	7/10

Pud Pud in Weird World received generally positive reviews from video game critics.
