= E-racer =

2001 video game

eRacer
- Developer: Rage Software
- Publisher: Rage Software
- Platform: Microsoft Windows
- Release: EU: 27 April 2001; NA: 30 April 2001
- Genre: Racing
- Mode: Multiplayer

eRacer (or e-Racer, e-racer or similar) is a 2001 arcade racing video game developed by Rage Software and released for Microsoft Windows. The player competes against computer opponents or other human players online in eight different cars. The single-player game consists of an arcade mode and a championship mode, where one would have to race against seven other computer opponents and would need to finish either first or second in each race in order to advance to the next round. An Xbox version was planned but cancelled.

== Original tracks ==
The original game contains thirteen tracks in Championship mode and a bonus track which is unlocked upon completion of the Championship mode. All tracks are playable in both Arcade and Multiplayer modes.

In order, they are

1. Town Centre - A road race through a town centre and mall.
2. Scrap Yard - Off-road in a scrapyard.
3. Freight Yard - A race through a freight train yard.
4. Chemical Plant - Balance of off-road and on-road through a chemical factory.
5. Aircraft Carrier - Race through and on an aircraft carrier and adjoining port.
6. Stone Quarry - Off-road race through a stone quarry.
7. Stately Home - Snow race near a fancy house.
8. Grim Up North - Road race through narrow streets of a small town.
9. Parking Lot - A race through a parking complex.
10. Indy Oval - Race on a NASCAR circuit, but also off-road in the center.
11. Hill Climb - Very snowy Circuit up and down a hill.
12. Fishing Village - Go through a village, its adjoining fort and beach.
13. The City - A race through a big city.

There is a bonus track called "Boy Racer". The first four tracks are unlocked from the beginning whilst the other tracks are unlocked by progressing through the Championship Mode.

== Cars ==
There are seven cars. The first two cars are unlocked upon the beginning; the other cars are unlocked upon coming first in Championship mode races.

In order of unlocking, they are:

1. Itas Sprint-XS
2. Exel Sportster
3. Mantis VRS
4. Proteus VVT
5. Aero-Tech SX
6. Ferreno GTV
7. Dominator GTR

There is also a bonus car called the "Sand Scorcher".

=== Skins ===
There are four liveries/decals for the cars. The skins have "sponsors" stickered onto them.

- A skin with a white front and a round transition into red at the back
- A full green skin
- A full white skin
- A skin with white at the front and a checkered-flag type transition into blue at the back.
