= Global Touring Challenge: Africa =

2001 racing video game

- Developer: Rage Software
- Publishers: PAL: Rage Software; NA: Majesco
- Platform: PlayStation 2
- Release: PAL: November 16, 2001; NA: June 11, 2002
- Genre: Racing
- Modes: Single-player, multiplayer

Global Touring Challenge: Africa (abbreviated GTC: Africa) is a 2001 racing video game for PlayStation 2 developed by Rage Software.

== Reception ==
Reception

Aggregate score
Aggregator	Score
Metacritic	64/100

Review scores
Publication	Score
Electronic Gaming Monthly	6/10
Famitsu	26/40
Game Informer	6.5/10
GamePro	3/5
GameSpot	5.8/10
GameSpy	55%
IGN	7.7/10
Jeuxvideo.com	11/20
Official U.S. PlayStation Magazine	2.5/5
PlayStation: The Official Magazine	7/10

The game received "mixed" reviews according to the review aggregation website Metacritic. In Japan, where the game was ported and published by Success on December 19, 2002, Famitsu gave it a score of 26 out of 40.
