= Denki =

Scottish video game developer

Denki Limited
- Industry: Video games
- Founded: January 2000; 26 years ago
- Founders: Colin Anderson; Stewart Graham; Aaron Puzey; David Jones
- Headquarters: Dundee, Scotland
- Products: Denki Blocks! Juggle! Quarrel; Save the Day! Denki Word Quest; Monster Force 5 Autonauts
- Number of employees: < 5
- Website: www.denki.co.uk

Denki Limited is a British video game developer based in Dundee and founded in January 2000 by four former DMA Design employees.

== History ==
Four former employees of DMA Design—Colin Anderson, Stewart Graham, Aaron Puzey, and David Jones—founded Denki in January 2000. They were joined by Gary Penn and Gary Timmons shortly thereafter. In February, Rage Software acquired 20% of Denki for £125,000 and agreed to publish the first three games by the developer.

The company created two original new games for the Game Boy Advance. The first was a puzzle game called Denki Blocks! Published by Rage Software in September 2001. This was followed by a platform-style game called Go! Go! Beckham! Adventure on Soccer Island – based on the famous English footballer – also published by Rage in August 2002. Both games picked up widespread critical acclaim and Denki Blocks! received several awards. However sales for both titles did not meet expectations.

As part of the promotional campaign for Denki Blocks!, the company created a version of the game for the newly launched games service on Sky Television in the UK. The response to the game was positive and Denki made the decision to focus on this new platform.

=== Digital Interactive Television games ===
Denki Blocks!, Denki's first title for Sky Television was released on 9 October 2001 when Sky Gamestar launched. It was accessible by all Sky digital subscribers, using only the standard set-top box and controller. Given the favourable response to this initial title, Denki was asked to create a number of other titles for Sky – both original and based on brands from television and movies.

Over the next seven years, Denki focused on DiTV games. The company refined their design and development process to the point where it could take an agreed design document and produce a completed title in under ten weeks.

=== Non-DiTV projects ===
While the majority of the titles created by Denki during this period were for DiTV platforms, the company also worked on two other significant projects

InQuizitor is a game-based learning tool, created in conjunction with educational gaming company 3MRT. lDenki provided graphic design services to the company then developing the game with 3MRT. InQuizitor was released in September 2008. It is used by educational establishments across the UK and Europe. InQuizitor has won a number of trophies, including the 2007 eLearning Award.

Crackdown is a sandbox game developed by Realtime Worlds for the Xbox 360. When Realtime Worlds first created the concept, Denki provided design and audio consultancy for the project. Denki's input was instrumental in helping Realtime Worlds to secure its publishing agreement with Microsoft for the title. Crackdown was released in February 2007. The game received positive critical reviews and a number of awards.

=== Console projects ===
Following the company's decision to focus on the new generation of platforms, Denki was working on two original new games.

Quarrel is a strategy word puzzle game, described as "Countdown meets Risk". It is being developed for Xbox Live Arcade (XBLA). In August 2009, Denki showed Quarrel in public for the first time, at the Dare to be Digital ProtoPlay event. Several hundred people were invited to play the game and give feedback to the company. Denki is using this information to polish and shape the final months of development. In 2011, Quarrel was picked up by UTV Ignition Entertainment for iOS devices, XBLA and Facebook.

=== Other games ===
On 20 May 2010, Denki released Denki Blocks! for iOS devices, followed by Denki Blocks! HD specifically for the iPad on 23 July 2010. This was followed by a brand new game on 19 June 2010 called Juggle!.

On 16 July 2010, Denki released Denki Blocks! Daily Workout for Facebook.

On 2 August 2010, Denki announced that they had submitted Juggle! for peer review on the Xbox Live Indie Games service. It was released on 7 September 2010.

On 7 June 2011, UTV Ignition Entertainment announced they were bringing Quarrel to iOS devices, XBLA and Facebook. Quarrel was released on iOS on 25 August 2011. On 17 October 2011, the game was announced as a nominee for a BAFTA Scotland award.

On 17 September 2012, Denki announced that Ludometrics was creating a new version of Bips!, based on an existing Denki prototype. The game eventually launched on Facebook in January 2013.

On 8 November 2012, Denki announced that Save the Day was live.

On 10 December 2012, Denki announced the launch of Denki Word Quest!. On 22 November 2013, Denki announced the launch of Monster Force 5. On 14 January 2014, Denki announced the launch of All Over The Place: Australia for the BBC.

On 5 July 2017, Denki announced the public release of its "Autonauts" demo via the Itch.io gaming platform. After a successful launch the game attracted funding from the UK Games Fund, won Best Educational Game at that year's TIGA awards, and quickly became one of Itch.io's top rated free games where it has remained in the top 100 ever since.

On 11 February 2019, Denki announced to members of its Autonauts Discord server that it had signed a deal that would see Autonauts published for PC via Steam "towards the end of the year". This was followed by an announcement on 16 July 2019 by Curve Digital that it was working with Denki to bring their "unique management sim Autonauts to PC this autumn" and that the demo version had been downloaded "over 300,000" times since launching in 2017. The game was first shown publicly at that year's Gamescom conference in Cologne from 20 to 24 August where UKIE selected the game to receive its UK Game of the Show award.

On 28 July 2022, Denki released Autonauts vs. Piratebots. This was a new game expanding on the create and automate features in the original Autonauts but added ways to attack and defend from five levels of an invading piratebot army.

On 17 September 2026, Denki released Sniper Dan. "Sniper Dan is a delightfully funny, family-friendly 3D Hidden Object game with a big twist. Use a sniper rifle to solve hundreds of low-stakes jobs across six packed locations, discover surprising secrets, snap hilarious photo ops, and unlock costumes, upgrades, office décor, collectables and more!"

== Games ==
2001

- Denki Blocks! – Platform: Sky Gamestar – Publisher: Rage/Sky Gamestar – Released: 31 August 2001
- Denki Blocks! – Platform: Game Boy Color – Publisher: Denki/Rage – Released: 19 October 2001
- Denki Blocks! – Platform: Game Boy Advance – Publisher: Denki/Rage – Released: 19 October 2001

2002

- Super Breakout (Original) – Platform: Sky Gamestar – Publisher: Sky Gamestar/Atari – Released: 17 May 2002
- Denki Blocks! – Platform: Mobile Phone – Publisher: Denki/Digital Bridges – Released: August 2002
- Go! Go! Beckham! – Platform: GBA – Publisher: Rage – Released: 30 August 2002
- Bust-a-Move – Platform: Sky Gamestar – Publisher: Sky Gamestar/Taito – Released: 11 October 2002
- Pac-Man – Platform: Sky Gamestar – Publisher: Sky Gamestar/Namco – Released: 13 December 2002

2003

- Hulk – Platform: Sky Gamestar – Publisher: Sky Gamestar/Universal – Released: 14 August 2003
- Caterpillar Crunch – Platform: SKY Gamestar – Publisher: Denki/Sky Gamestar – Released: 14 August 2003
- Courage the Cowardly Dog Episode 1: Katz Kidnap – Platform: Sky Gamestar – Publisher: Sky Gamestar/Cartoon Network – Released: 23 October 2003
- Darts – Platform: Sky Gamestar – Publisher: Sky Gamestar/Sky Sports – Released: 4 December 2003
- Duopolis – Platform: Sky Gamestar – Publisher: Sky Gamestar – Released: 4 December 2003
- Word Crunch – Platform: Sky Gamestar – Publisher: Sky Gamestar – Released: 4 December 2003

2004

- Looney Tunes: Back in Action Episode 1 – Platform: Sky Gamestar – Publisher: Sky Gamestar/Warner Bros. – Released: 12 February 2004
- Bips! – Platform: Sky Gamestar – Publisher: Denki/Sky Gamestar – Released: 12 February 2004
- Letter Box – Platform: Sky Gamestar – Publisher: Sky Gamestar – Released: 18 March 2004
- Tom and Jerry Episode 1: Mouse Party – Platform: Sky Gamestar – Publisher: Sky Gamestar/Cartoon Network – Released: 6 May 2004
- Courage the Cowardly Dog Episode 2: Katz Komeback – Platform: Sky Gamestar – Publisher: Sky Gamestar/Cartoon Network – Released: 8 July 2004
- Looney Tunes: Back in Action Episode 2 – Platform: Sky Gamestar – Publisher: Sky GamestarWarner Bros. – Released: 15 July 2004
- Codename: Kids Next Door Episode 1: Operation: B.I.T.T.E.R.S.W.E.E.T. – Platform: Sky Gamestar – Publisher: Sky Gamestar/Cartoon Network – Released: 29 July 2004
- Courage the Cowardly Dog Episode 3: Le Quack Attack – Platform: Sky Gamestar – Publisher: Sky Gamestar/Cartoon Network – Released: 9 September 2004
- Scooby-Doo! Episode 1: The Mystery of Eerie Isle – Platform: Sky Gamestar – Publisher: Sky Gamestar/Cartoon Network – Released: 16 September 2004
- Thunderbirds: Flashpoint Earth – Platform: Sky Gamestar – Publisher: Sky Gamestar/Universal – Released: 14 October 2004
- Genie's Cave – Platform: Sky Gamestar – Publisher: Sky Gamestar – Released: 2 December 2004
- Tom and Jerry Episode 2: Merry Christmouse – Platform: Sky Gamestar – Publisher: Sky Gamestar/Cartoon Network – Released: 16 December 2004
- Tetris – Platform: Sky Gamestar – Publisher: Sky Gamestar/The Tetris Company – Released: 16 December 2004

2005

- Codename: Kids Next Door Episode 2: Operation: S.H.I.P.W.R.E.C.K.E.D. – Platform: Sky Gamestar – Publisher: Sky Gamestar/Cartoon Network – Released: 6 January 2005
- Boggle – Platform: Sky Gamestar – Publisher: Sky Gamestar/Hasbro – Released: 17 February 2005
- Shrek Episode 1: Fiona's Rescue – Platform: SKY Gamestar – Publisher: Sky Gamestar/DreamWorks – Released: 17 February 2005
- Dexter's Laboratory Episode 1: Dexter vs. Mandark – Platform: Sky Gamestar – Publisher: Sky Gamestar/Cartoon Network – Released: 24 March 2005
- Foster's Home for Imaginary Friends Episode 1: Tick Tock Terror – Platform: Sky Gamestar – Publisher: Sky Gamestar/Cartoon Network – Released: 14 April 2005
- Looney Tunes: Back in Action Episode 3: Rabbit Rescue – Platform: Sky Gamestar – Publisher: Sky Gamestar – Released: 6 May 2005
- Tom and Jerry Episode 3: Mansion House Mouse – Platform: Sky Gamestar – Publisher: Sky Gamestar/Cartoon Network – Released: 12 May 2005
- Jumble Fever – Platform: SKY Gamestar – Publisher: Sky Gamestar – Released: 9 June 2005
- Shrek Episode 2: Disarming Charming – Platform: Sky Gamestar – Publisher: Sky Gamestar/DreamWorks – Released: 14 July 2005
- Codename: Kids Next Door Episode 3: Operation: R.E.V.E.N.G.E. – Platform: Sky Gamestar – Publisher: Sky Gamestar/Cartoon Network – Released: 4 August 2005
- Ed, Edd n Eddy Episode 1: Night of the Living Ed – Platform: Sky Gamestar – Publisher: Sky Gamestar/Cartoon Network – Released: 11 August 2005
- Scooby-Doo! Episode 2 Mummy Madness – Platform: Sky Gamestar – Publisher: Sky Gamestar/Cartoon Network – Released: 8 September 2005
- Star Trek: The Next Generation: STRANDED – Platform: Sky Gamestar – Publisher: Sky Gamestar/Paramount – Released: 8 September 2005
- Wallace & Gromit: The Curse of the Were-Rabbit – Platform: Sky Gamestar – Publisher: Sky Gamestar/Aardman – Released: 6 October 2005
- Dexter's Laboratory Episode 2: Mandark Strikes Back – Platform: Sky Gamestar – Publisher: Sky Gamestar/Cartoon Network – Released: 13 October 2005
- Foster's Home for Imaginary Friends Episode 2: Brotherly Love – Platform: Sky Gamestar – Publisher: Sky Gamestar/Cartoon Network – Released: 10 November 2005
- Ed, Edd n Eddy Episode 2: Jingle-Bell Ed – Platform: Sky Gamestar – Publisher: Sky Gamestar/Cartoon Network – Released: 15 December 2005
- Scooby-Doo! Episode 3: The Curse of Mystery Mine – Platform: Sky Gamestar – Publisher: Sky Gamestar/Cartoon Network – Released: 15 December 2005
- Word Crunch Deluxe – Platform: Sky Gamestar – Publisher: Sky Gamestar – Released: 15 December 2005
- Jumble Fever: Christmas – Platform: Sky Gamestar – Publisher: Sky Gamestar – Released: 15 December 2005
- Shrek Episode 3: Fairy Godmother's Revenge – Platform: Sky Gamestar – Publisher: Sky Gamestar/DreamWorks – Released: 15 December 2005

2006

- Dexter's Laboratory Episode 3: Dorkster's Revenge – Platform: Sky Gamestar – Publisher: Sky Gamestar/Cartoon Network – Released: 12 January 2006
- Tom and Jerry Episode 4 Duck and Cover – Platform: Sky Gamestar – Publisher: Sky Gamestar/Cartoon Network – Released: 9 February 2006
- SpongeBob SquarePants Episode 1: Bikini Bottom Bother – Platform: Sky Gamestar – Publisher: Sky Gamestar/Nickelodeon – Released: 16 February 2006
- The Grim Adventures of Billy & Mandy – Platform: Sky Gamestar – Publisher: Sky Gamestar/Cartoon Network – Released: 9 March 2006
- Jumble Fever: Scooby-Doo – Platform: Sky Gamestar – Publisher: Sky Gamestar/Cartoon Network – Released: 16 March 2006
- Tomb Raider: The Reckoning: Episode 1 – Platform: Bell ExpressVu – Publisher: Bell ExpressVu/Eidos – Released: March 2006
- Who Wants to be a Millionaire? – Platform: Sky Gamestar – Publisher: Sky Gamestar/Celador – Released: 30 March 2006
- Codename: Kids Next Door: Operation: T.E.E.N.A.G.E.R. – Platform: Sky Gamestar – Publisher: Sky Gamestar/Cartoon Network – Released: 6 April 2006
- Jumble Fever: Easter – Platform: Sky Gamestar – Publisher: Sky Gamestar – Released: 6 April 2006
- Who Wants to be a Millionaire? Gold – Platform: Sky Gamestar – Publisher: Sky Gamestar/Celador – Released: 20 April 2006
- SpongeBob SquarePants Episode 2: Krabby Patty Kidnap – Platform: Sky Gamestar – Publisher: Sky Gamestar/Nickelodeon – Released: 27 April 2006
- Scooby-Doo! Mysteries Episode 1: The Case of the Creepy Cowboy – Platform: Sky Gamestar – Publisher: Sky Gamestar/Cartoon Network – Released: 11 May 2006
- InQuizitor – Platform: PC – Publisher: 3MRT – Released: May 2006
- Shrek Episode 4: Double Trouble – Platform: Sky Gamestar – Publisher: Sky Gamestar/DreamWorks – Released: 18 May 2006
- Jumble Fever: Tom and Jerry – Platform: Sky Gamestar – Publisher: Sky Gamestar/Cartoon Network – Released: 8 June 2006
- Jumble Football Fever – Platform: Sky Gamestar – Publisher: Sky Gamestar – Released: 8 June 2006
- SpongeBob SquarePants Episode 3: The Flying Dutchman – Platform: Sky Gamestar – Publisher: Sky Gamestar/Nickelodeon – Released: 6 July 2006
- Scooby-Doo! Episode 4: Tomb It May Concern – Platform: Sky Gamestar – Publisher: Sky Gamestar/Cartoon Network – Released: 27 July 2006
- SpongeBob SquarePants Episode 4: Save Our Sandy – Platform: Sky Gamestar – Publisher: Sky Gamestar/Nickelodeon – Released: 17 August 2006
- Shrek Episode 5: Imperial Peril – Platform: Sky Gamestar – Publisher: Sky Gamestar/DreamWorks – Released: 17 August 2006
- Tomb Raider: The Reckoning: Episode 2 – Platform: Bell ExpressVu – Publisher: Bell ExpressVu/Eidos – Released: September 2006
- Tom and Jerry Episode 5: Rickety House Mouse – Platform: Sky Gamestar – Publisher: Sky Gamestar/Cartoon Network – Released: 5 October 2006
- Scooby-Doo! Mysteries Episode 2: The Case of the Frosty Snowman – Platform: Sky Gamestar – Publisher: Sky Gamestar/Cartoon Network – Released: 19 October 2006
- Jumble Fever: Halloween – Platform: Sky Gamestar – Publisher: Sky Gamestar – Released: 19 October 2006
- Number Crunch – Platform: Sky Gamestar – Publisher: Denki/Sky Gamestar – Released: 9 November 2006
- All Grown Up!: Confiscated Cards – Platform: Sky Gamestar – Publisher: Sky Gamestar/Nickelodeon – Released: 7 December 2006
- Word Crunch 2: Conundrums – Platform: Sky Gamestar – Publisher: Sky Gamestar – Released: 14 December 2006

2007

- Denki Blocks! Brain Teasers Volume 1 – Platform: DirecTV Game Lounge – Publisher: Denki/DirecTV – Released: January 2007
- Hot Wheels: Monster Truck Smashdown Episode 1 – Platform: DirecTV Game Lounge – Publisher: DirecTV/Mattel – Released: January 2007
- Letter Box – Platform: DirecTV Game Lounge – Publisher: DirecTV – Released: January 2007
- Word Crunch – Platform: DirecTV Game Lounge – Publisher: DirecTV – Released: January 2007
- Barbie in the 12 Dancing Princesses – Platform: DirecTV Game Lounge – Publisher: DirecTV/Mattel – Released: January 2007
- Barbie: World Fashion Tour – Platform: DirecTV Game Lounge – Publisher: DirecTV/Mattel – Released: January 2007
- Polly Pocket: SPLASH! – Platform: DirecTV Game Lounge – Publisher: DirecTV/Mattel – Released: January 2007
- Super Break Thru – Platform: DirecTV Game Lounge – Publisher: DirecTV – Released: January 2007
- Tumble Fever – Platform: DirecTV Game Lounge – Publisher: DirecTV – Released: January 2007
- Codename: Kids Next Door Episode 4: Operation: G.U.M.D.R.O.P. – Platform: Sky Gamestar – Publisher: Sky Gamestar/Cartoon Network – Released: 8 February 2007
- Number Crunch – Platform: DirecTV Game Lounge – Publisher: Denki/DirecTV – Released: February 2007
- Kingpin Bowling – Platform: Sky Gamestar – Publisher: Sky Gamestar – Released: 8 February 2007
- Crackdown – Platform: PC – Publisher: Real Time Worlds/Microsoft – Released: February 2007
- Carol Vorderman's Mind Aerobics – Platform: Sky Gamestar – Publisher: Sky Gamestar – Released: 15 March 2007
- Word Crunch Volume 2 – Platform: DirecTV Game Lounge – Publisher: DirecTV – Released: March 2007
- Beehive Jumble Fever – Platform: Sky Gamestar – Publisher: Sky Gamestar – Released: 22 March 2007
- Robotboy Episode 1: Kamikazi Kidnap! – Platform: Sky Gamestar – Publisher: Sky Gamestar/Cartoon Network – Released: 29 March 2007
- Tumble Fever Easter – Platform: DirecTV Game Lounge – Publisher: DirecTV – Released: March 2007
- Letter Box Deluxe – Platform: DirecTV Game Lounge – Publisher: DirecTV – Released: April 2007
- Tom and Jerry Episode 6: An Eggs-plosive Easter! – Platform: Sky Gamestar – Publisher: Sky Gamestar/Cartoon Network – Released: 5 April 2007
- Jumble Quest: The Lost Pyramids – Platform: Sky Gamestar – Publisher: Sky Gamestar – Released: 5 April 2007
- Shrek Jumble Rumble – Platform: Sky Gamestar – Publisher: Sky Gamestar/DreamWorks – Released: 5 April 2007
- Carol Vorderman's Mind Aerobics: Summer Shape Up – Platform: Sky Gamestar – Publisher: Sky Gamestar – Released: 7 June 2007
- Tumble Fever Summer – Platform: DirecTV Game Lounge – Publisher: DirecTV – Released: June 2007
- Shrek the Third – Platform: Sky Gamestar – Publisher: Sky Gamestar/DreamWorks – Released: 14 June 2007
- Bugz – Platform: Sky Gamestar – Publisher: Sky Gamestar – Released: 21 June 2007
- Hot Wheels: Monster Truck Smashdown Episode 02 – Platform: DirecTV Game Lounge – Publisher: DirecTV/Mattel – Released: July 2007
- Robotboy Episode 2: Something in the Darkness Drools! – Platform: Sky Gamestar – Publisher: Sky Gamestar/Cartoon Network – Released: 5 July 2007
- Tenpin Bowling – Platform: DirecTV Game Lounge – Publisher: DirecTV – Released: July 2007
- Denki Blocks! Brain Teasers Volume 02 – Platform: DirecTV Game Lounge – Publisher: Denki/DirecTV – Released: July 2007
- Jumble Fever: SpongeBob SquarePants – Platform: Sky Gamestar – Publisher: Sky Gamestar/Nickelodeon – Released: 12 July 2007
- Nicktoons: Ready Orb Not – Platform: DirecTV Game Lounge – Publisher: Waterfront/Nickelodeon – Released: July 2007
- Barbie: World Fashion Tour '07 Collection – Platform: DirecTV Game Lounge – Publisher: DirecTV/Mattel – Released: August 2007
- Darts – Platform: DirecTV Game Lounge – Publisher: DirecTV – Released: August 2007
- Quick Wit Volume 1 – Platform: DirecTV Game Lounge – Publisher: DirecTV – Released: August 2007
- The Grim Adventures of Billy & Mandy: Hell's Hamsters – Platform: Sky Gamestar – Publisher: Sky Gamestar/Cartoon Network – Released: 6 September 2007
- Reversi – Platform: DirecTV Game Lounge – Publisher: DirecTV – Released: September 2007
- Tom and Jerry Dynamice – Platform: Sky Gamestar – Publisher: Sky Gamestar/Cartoon Network – Released: 13 September 2007
- Tumble Fever Halloween – Platform: DirecTV Game Lounge – Publisher: DirecTV – Released: October 2007
- Berenstain Bears – Platform: DirecTV Game Lounge – Publisher: DirecTV/PBS – Released: October 2007
- Fetch! What a State – Platform: DirecTV Game Lounge – Publisher: DirecTV/PBS – Released: October 2007
- LEGO Castle: The Sword of Virtue – Platform: Sky Gamestar – Publisher: Sky Gamestar/LEGO – Released: 11 October 2007
- Tumble Fever Passions – Platform: DirecTV Game Lounge – Publisher: DirecTV – Released: November 2007
- Ben 10 Episode 1: Vilgax Venom – Platform: Sky Gamestar – Publisher: Sky Games/Cartoon Network – Released: 8 November 2007
- 21s – Platform: DirecTV Game Lounge – Publisher: DirecTV – Released: November 2007
- Avatar Jumble Fever – Platform: Sky Gamestar – Publisher: Sky Gamestar/Nickelodeon – Released: 22 November 2007
- Robotboy Episode 3: Repair or Despair – Platform: Sky Gamestar – Publisher: Sky Gamestar/Cartoon Network – Released: 29 November 2007
- Tumble Fever Xmas – Platform: DirecTV Game Lounge – Publisher: DirecTV – Released: December 2007
- SpongeBob SquarePants Episode 5: Snow Woes: – Platform: Sky Gamestar – Publisher: Sky Gamestar/Nickelodeon – Released: 6 December 2007
- The Muppet Show: Backstage Rampage – Platform: Sky Gamestar – Publisher: Sky Gamestar/Disney – Released: 13 December 2007

2008

- Tumbler – Platform: DirecTV Game Lounge – Publisher: DirecTV – Released: February 2008
- Ben 10 Episode 2: Call of the Wildmutt – Platform: Sky Gamestar – Publisher: Sky Games/Cartoon Network – Released: 7 February 2008
- Barbie Luv Me 3 Puppy Tricks – Platform: DirecTV Game Lounge – Publisher: DirecTV/Mattel – Released: February 2008
- Tumble Fever Flash – Platform: DirecTV Web portal – Publisher: DirecTV – Released: March 2008
- Hot Wheels: Monster Truck Smashdown Episode 03 – Platform: DirecTV Game Lounge – Publisher: DirecTV/Mattel – Released: March 2008
- Denki's Sticky Blocks! – Platform: Sky Gamestar – Publisher: Denki/Sky Gamestar – Released: 6 March 2008
- Word Crunch Deluxe – Platform: DirecTV Game Lounge – Publisher: DirecTV – Released: March 2008
- Polly Pocket: Polly Wheels Episode 1 – Platform: DirecTV Game Lounge – Publisher: DirecTV/Mattel – Released: March 2008
- Tetris 2008 – Platform: Sky Gamestar – Publisher: SKY Gamestar/The Tetris Company – Released: 6 March 2008
- Polly Pocket: SPLASH! Episode 2 – Platform: DirecTV Game Lounge – Publisher: DirecTV/Mattel – Released: April 2008
- Pat Sajak's Code Letter Crossword Connections – Platform: DirecTV Game Lounge – Publisher: DirecTV/Pat Sajak Games – Released: April 2008
- Tom and Jerry Dynamice 2 – Platform: Sky Gamestar – Publisher: Sky Gamestar/Cartoon Network – Released: 8 May 2008
- Ben 10 Episode 3: Upchuck Unveiled – Platform: Sky Gamestar – Publisher SKY Gamestar/Cartoon Network – Released: 5 June 2008
- Mad Libs – Platform: DirecTV Game Lounge – Publisher: DirecTV – Released: June 2008
- Polly Pocket: Polly Wheels Episode 2 – Platform: DirecTV Game Lounge – Publisher: DirecTV/Mattel – Released: July 2008
- Robotboy Episode 4: Tag Team Trouble – Platform: Sky Gamestar – Publisher: Sky Gamestar/Cartoon Network – Released: 14 August 2008
- Spin to Win – Platform: DirecTV Game Lounge – Publisher: DirecTV – Released: August 2008
- Sundae Scoop – Platform: DirecTV Game Lounge – Publisher: DirecTV – Released: August 2008
- Pat Sajak's Lost & Found Words – Platform: DirecTV Game Lounge – Publisher: DirecTV/Pat Sajak Games – Released: August 2008
- Quick Wit Volume 2 – Platform: DirecTV Game Lounge – Publisher: DirecTV – Released: October 2008
- Golden Balls – Platform: Sky Gamestar – Publisher: Sky Gamestar/Endemol – Released: 9 October 2008
- SpongeBob SquarePants Episode 6: Forest of Fear – Platform: Sky Gamestar – Publisher: Sky Gamestar/Nickelodeon – Released: 9 October 2008
- Crunch Time – Platform: Sky Gamestar – Publisher: Sky Gamestar – Released: 4 December 2008
- WALL-E – Platform: DirecTV Game Lounge – Publisher: DirecTV/Disney-Pixar – Released: 4 December 2008
- Ben 10 Episode 4: Howlin' Benwolf – Platform: Sky Gamestar – Publisher: Sky Gamestar/Cartoon Network – Released: December 2008

2009

- SpongeBob SquarePants: Journey to the Centre of Patrick – Platform: DirecTV Game Lounge – Publisher: DirecTV/Nickelodeon – Released: March 2009
- Family Fortunes – Platform: Sky Gamestar – Publisher: Sky Gamestar/Fremantle – Released: 19 March 2009
- Ben 10: Alien Force: Swampfired Up – Platform: Sky Gamestar – Publisher: Sky Gamestar/Cartoon Network – Released: 2 April 2009

2010

- Denki Blocks! – Platform: iOS Devices – Released: 19 May 2010
- Juggle! – Platform: iOS Devices – Released: 20 June 2010
- Denki Blocks! Daily Workout – Platform: Facebook – Released: July 2010
- Juggle! – Platform: Xbox Live Indie Games – Released: 7 September 2010
- Big Cup Cricket – Platform: iOS Devices – Publisher: Square Enix – Released: 6 December 2010

2011

- Big Hit Baseball – Platform: iOS Devices – Publisher: Square Enix – Released: February 2011
- Quarrel – Platform: iOS Devices – Publisher: UTV Ignition Entertainment – Released: 25 August 2011

2012

- Quarrel – Platform: Xbox Live Arcade – Publisher: UTV Ignition Entertainment – Released: 25 January 2012
- Save the Day – Platform: HTML5 Browser – Publisher: Turbulenz – Released: 8 November 2012
- Denki Word Quest! – Platform: HTML5 Browser – Publisher: Turbulenz – Released: 10 December 2012

2013

- Denki Blocks! – Platform: HTML5 Browser – Publisher: Turbulenz – Released: 14 January 2013
- Monster Force 5 – Platform: HTML5 Browser – Publisher: Turbulenz – Released: 12 November 2013
- Moshi Monsters: Music – Platform: iOS & Android Devices – Publisher: Mind Candy – Released: 21 November 2013
- Par Tribus – Platform: iOS & Android Devices – Released: 21 November 2013

2014

- All Over the Place Australia – Platform: HTML5 Browser – Publisher: British Broadcasting Corporation – Released: January 2014
- Jigmania: Snow White – Platform: Browser – Publisher: Spil Games – Released: March 2014

2019

- Autonauts – Platform: Microsoft Windows – Publisher: Curve Digital – Released: 17 October 2019

2022

- Autonauts vs. Piratebots – Platform: Microsoft Windows – Publisher: Curve Digital – Released: 28 July 2022

2026

- Sniper Dan - Platform: Microsoft Windows - Publisher: PQube - Released: 17 September 2026

== Other games by Denki ==
- iCarly – Platform: DirecTV Game Lounge – Publisher: DirecTV/Nickelodeon
- Recess – Platform: DirecTV Game Lounge – Publisher: DirecTV/Disney
- Avatar: The Last Airbender – Platform: DirecTV Game Lounge – Publisher: DirecTV/Nickelodeon
- Avatar 2 – Platform: DirecTV Game Lounge – Publisher: DirecTV/Nickelodeon
- Beehive Bedlam – Platform: Sky Gamestar/Sky Games – Publisher: Sky Gamestar/Sky Games (cancelled)
- The Incredible Hulk – Platform: Sky Gamestar/Sky Games – Publisher: Sky Gamestar/Sky Games/Marvel (cancelled)
- Jumble Fever Cartoon Network – Platform: Sky Gamestar/Sky Games – Publisher: Sky Gamestar/Sky Games/Cartoon Network (cancelled)
- Fame Chains - Platform: Sky Gamestar/Sky Games – Publisher: Sky Gamestar/Sky Games (cancelled)

== Awards ==
- Denki Blocks! – ECTS 2001 Overall Best Game of Show; Best Handheld Game of the Show
- Develop Industry Excellence Awards – Best Emerging-Platform Developer (2003)
- TIGA – Best Developer (2007)
- Quarrel – BAFTA Scotland 2011, Best Game
- Quarrel – BAFTA Video Game Awards 2012, Best Mobile & Handheld Game – nomination
- Quarrel – The Independent Game Developer Awards 2012, Best Serious Game
- Quarrel – The Independent Game Developer Awards 2012, Best Social Game
