= Hudson Hawk (video game) =

1991 video game

- NES cover art
- Developer: Special FX Software
- Publisher: Ocean Software
- Programmers: Amstrad, Game Boy, Spectrum; Jim Bagley; Amiga; Ian Moran; Atari ST; Joffa Smith; C64, NES; Robert Tinman
- Artists: Chas Davies; Karen Davies; Ivan Davies; Colin Rushby
- Composer: Keith Tinman
- Platforms: Amiga, Amstrad CPC, Atari ST, Commodore 64, Game Boy, NES, ZX Spectrum
- Release: NES: JP: December 27, 1991; EU: 1991; NA: February 1992; Game Boy: NA: December 1991; JP: March 13, 1992
- Genre: Platform
- Mode: Single-player

Hudson Hawk is a platform game developed by Special FX Software for the Amstrad CPC, Amiga, Atari ST, Commodore 64 and ZX Spectrum based on the film of the same name. It was released in 1991 and published by Ocean Software. Sony Imagesoft released it in the US for the Game Boy and NES. This was the final game completed by Special FX Software, before Ocean and Special FX Software broke apart.

== Plot ==
The player assumes the role of Hudson Hawk, a cat burglar. He is sent on a mission to steal three Da Vinci artifacts.

== Gameplay ==
Walking through various levels in this platform game, the player must avoid sounding alarms. In addition, security guards and dogs show up to hamper the mission. Hudson Hawk can pacify the enemies by punching them or launching tennis balls at them.

Rhinoceros in the library (Amiga)

A hostile kangaroo (NES)

== Development ==
In Spain, it was published as El Gran Halcon, the Spanish title for the film.

An SNES version was in development, but was cancelled when the film flopped.

== Reception ==
Reception

Awards
Publication	Award
Crash	Crash Smash
Sinclair User	SU Classic
Amstrad Action	Mastergame
