= Incoming Forces =

2002 video game

- European cover art
- Developer: Rage Software
- Publisher: Hip Interactive
- Platform: Microsoft Windows
- Release: EU: March 8, 2002; NA: September 25, 2002
- Genre: Shooter
- Modes: Single-player, multiplayer

Incoming Forces is a 2002 shooter video game developed by Rage Software and published by Hip Interactive. It is the sequel to the 1998 video game Incoming. The game's plot picks up after the plot of the original game.

== Reception ==
Reception

Aggregate score
Aggregator	Score
Metacritic	67/100

Review scores
Publication	Score
Computer Games Magazine	2.5/5
GameSpot	6.6/10
GameSpy	3/5
GameZone	6.5/10
IGN	7.9/10
PC Gamer (UK)	64%
PC Gamer (US)	59%
PC Zone	65%

Incoming Forces received "average" reviews according to the review aggregation website Metacritic.

== Incoming Trilogy digital re-release ==
In March 2015, Funbox Media, Ltd, owners of the Incoming brand, revealed that the Jordan Freeman Group was able to successfully convert the Incoming Subversion expansion pack for modern PCs. The Incoming Trilogy comes bundled with the original Incoming, Incoming Forces, and the Incoming Subversion expansion pack. Incoming Trilogy comes bundled with its original soundtracks and original manuals. The Incoming Trilogy is distributed via JFG's ZOOM-Platform.com.
