= Go! Go! Beckham! Adventure on Soccer Island =

2002 video game

- Cover art
- Developer: Denki
- Publisher: Rage Software
- Platform: Game Boy Advance
- Release: EU: 2002
- Genre: Platformer
- Mode: Single-player

Go! Go! Beckham! Adventure on Soccer Island is a platform video game developed by Denki and published by Rage Software for the Game Boy Advance. It was released in Europe in 2002 and was not released in other regions.

The game follows the main character, David Beckham, on his quest to defeat the evil Mister Woe in order to restore peace to Soccer Island. Beckham can use his football in order to collect items and to remove enemies from play. Eurogamer's Tom Bramwell called the game the best original platform game on the Game Boy Advance released in 2002. As of 2009, Adventure on Soccer Island has received a compilation score of 75% from GameRankings.

== Gameplay ==
David Beckham kicks his football to collect coins.

The gameplay focuses on completing levels and collecting items to progress; there are around forty levels to complete. The fantastical level design is similar to the type seen in Super Mario World 2: Yoshi's Island and other 16 bit era games, while the gameplay is reminiscent of Soccer Kid.

Adventure on Soccer Island utilizes the football skills of its real-life protagonist, David Beckham, as game mechanics. David Beckham must use his soccer ball in order to defeat enemies, collect items and progress through levels. Beckham normally dribbles the soccer ball, but the player can kick the ball in any direction to collect items and defeat enemies. Beckham can level up certain attributes after performing them enough; for example, his kicking skill can level up after he has kicked the ball enough.

The plot of the game centres around Mister Woe, who has invaded Soccer Island; Mister Woe has taken all "precious things", and turned all the animals of the island into monsters. It is up to David Beckham to save the island.

== Reception ==
The game received mostly positive reviews from critics, who were surprised at the game's quality; currently, the game has received a compilation score of 75% from GameRankings. Eurogamer's Tom Bramwell noted that the game beat his low expectations, and called the game the "best original platformer on the GBA this year." IGN's Ben Cartledge felt that the game beat most other third-party platform games for the GBA. Jeuxvideo's Nicolas Charciarek had a more negative impression, comparing the game unfavorably as a "clone" of Super Mario Advance.

Criticism focused mostly on the game's short length and ease of play. IGN's Ben Cartledge noted that the game was easily finished quickly, but that the real time spent in the game was focused on collecting items throughout gameplay. Eurogamer's Tom Bramwell felt that the game was too easy, and wished there was more content.
