= AYSO Soccer '97 =

1997 video game

- Developer: Rage Games
- Publisher: GameTek
- Platform: Windows
- Release: 1997
- Genre: Sports

AYSO Soccer '97 is a 1997 video game from GameTek. The game is licensed by the American Youth Soccer Organization.

== Gameplay ==
AYSO Soccer 97: World Challenge is designed specifically for children aged 5 to 18 within the American Youth Soccer Organization (AYSO), and allows users to select real-life AYSO teams—including rosters that may feature their own name. With a built-in face editor, players can customize avatars to mirror themselves. Gameplay begins at the local level, with the goal of winning the city championship. Victory leads to a world tour and the ultimate challenge: the global title. Matches are short and accessible to cater to younger attention spans, with durations ranging from two to ten minutes, even though the in-game clock displays full 45-minute halves. Graphically, the game uses identical character models across all age leagues—from under-6 to under-19—while gameplay speeds vary with older teams.

== Development ==
The game was announced in May 1996.

== Reception ==
Reception

Review scores
Publication	Score
Computer Games Magazine	3/5
Gamecenter	2/5
GameSpot	2.6/10

Games Domain said "I must say, FIFA 96 is a super-hot title which you will find at a bargain prize and it may very well suit your kids aged around 10 years and more. There you get an idea of soccer gameplay, reasonable graphics, good sound effects and so on. ASYO Soccer may be the choice for very young kids and old computers. You get a lot of morality, positive coaching and information about the AYSO program but one thing is brutally missing: a soccer game which is worthwhile to play".

GameSpot said "While there's not much good here, there are several tournament and season modes if you're so inclined. Also, real AYSO player names and teams were included in the making of AYSO '97, so young soccer heroes around the country will be able to look through the rosters and find their names; a player editor lets them change their name or appearance if they're embarrassed".
