= Denki Blocks! =

2001 video game

- Developers: Denki; Covert Operations (Game Boy Color); Tiger Games (PSP)
- Publishers: Rage Games (EU); Majesco (US); Global A Entertainment (JP); Jakyl (Xperia Play)
- Platforms: Game Boy Color; Game Boy Advance; PlayStation Portable; Sky Gamestar; Android iOS
- Release: Game Boy Color: EU: 18 October 2001; Game Boy Advance: EU: 18 October 2001; US: 2002; JP: April 11, 2002; PlayStation Portable: WW: 2011; Android: WW: 2011; iOS: WW: 2010
- Genre: Puzzle
- Modes: Single-player; Multiplayer

Denki Blocks! is a puzzle video game developed by Denki and originally released in 2001 by Rage Games for Sky Gamestar and the Game Boy Color and Game Boy Advance. In the game, players manoeuvre different coloured blocks around a grid to join those of the same colour together. The game features versus modes for multiple players. Denki Blocks! was ported to the PlayStation Portable in 2011 by Tiger Games, and to Android the same year and iOS in 2010.

Many features had to be added to meet price requirements. Denki Blocks! was released in the United States in 2002 by Majesco. The game received positive reviews, with critics praising the gaily coloured graphics, but a major criticism of the iOS version was the lack of an online leaderboard.

== Gameplay ==
A typical game in progress. At the top-right are the colours to be joined

Players manoeuvre blocks (called "Gumblocks") around a board also consisting of "blockers", which never move. A move is a single step in one of the cardinal directions, which is applied simultaneously to all Gumblocks that are not blocked. When Gumblocks of the same colour collide, they merge into one (called "clumps"). The main objectives are either to join Gumblocks of the same colour, or to join Gumblocks of a certain colour into a specific shape. The last move can be reverted, and games can be restarted at any time. Some puzzles feature bonus shapes or a "Three Of A Kind" (three clumps of different colours but the same shape) which earn "Denki Stars" if made. Denki Stars can be spent on special puzzles in the "Denki Blocks! Club".

In the Game Boy Advance version, there are three single-player modes: Tournament, Workout, and Perfecto!. Tournament mode has the player solve at least 15 of groups (of which there are eight of increasing difficulty, each set by a "leading Denki Blocks! player") of 25 puzzles. Doing so earns a trophy and progression to the next level. In Workout, players can practise forming shapes, and Perfecto! challenges the player to make a Puzzle Islander's favourite shape more quickly and efficiently than they can. The multiplayer modes consist of Race, All Change!, and Battle. In Race, players race to make shapes. All Change! has two stages, the first of which is to join Gumblocks within 30 seconds. Players who fail to do so are eliminated. Shapes are then swapped amongst players, who then have to form it. The first to make their shape wins. Battle is a turn-based mode where players join every Gumblock of their colour. Turns end when blocks are joined.

The iOS version features additional "Master Challenges" such as solving puzzles in a limited number of moves and within a time limit.

== Development and release ==
Denki Blocks! was released on 18 October 2001 for the Game Boy Color (developed by Covert Operations) and Game Boy Advance. It was previously released on Open Games (later Sky Gamestar) after Rage Games signed a deal with BSkyB. In late 2001, Majesco revealed that it would be publishing Rage games in the United States. The game was published in the United States in late 2002. Denki's internal development manager Gary Penn said that Denki had a problem when they first made the game: they had wanted to do it in a particular way, but because it had to have a certain price, they eventually added many features. A Java version for mobile phones was released in 2002.

The game was released on iOS in May 2010, and Android (named Denki Blocks! Deluxe) the following year. This version was published by Kakyl and is optimised for the Xperia Play. The iOS version was re-released specifically for iPad in July 2010. 2011 also was the release of a PlayStation Portable version developed by Tiger Games. Tiger Games's managing director James Bryan said that he loved Denki Blocks! and that the company worked closely with Denki. The PlayStation Portable version was developed to make use of the console's high resolution display. Denki's managing director Colin Anderson stated that Denki have searching for partners to port their games to other platforms, and that they were very impressed with Tiger Games. He said Tiger Games did "an impressive job" with the PlayStation Portable version, and that it felt like a Denki creation. The game was also released on the PlayStation 3.

A Facebook version, Denki Blocks! Daily Workout, was announced in 2010 as a blend of the Game Boy Advance version's puzzle and workout modes. A version for the Turbulenz platform was released in early 2013.

== Reception ==
Reception

Review scores
Publication	Score
Edge	7/10 (GBA)
Eurogamer	9/10 (iOS)
GameSpy	80% (GBA)
IGN	8/10 (GBA); 7.5/10 (iOS)
Jeuxvideo.com	15/20 (GBA)
PocketGamer	3.5/5 (iOS); 3.5/5 (Xperia Play)
Frictionless Insight	3.5/5 (GBA)
Gameswelt	91% (GBA)
EAGB Advance	5/5 (GBA)
TouchArcade	4/5 (iOS)
PSP Minis	7/20 (PSP)
GameZone	8.2/10 (GBA)

Denki Blocks! was well received. Reviewers particularly praised the gaily coloured graphics and the difficulty of the puzzles.

Craig Harris of IGN described the Game Boy Advance version of Denki Blocks! as "a lot of fun and one hell of a mind twister" and praised graphics and sound as bright and cheery, but wished that it supported console linking. The colourful graphics were also praised by Jeuxvideo.com, Kyle Ackerman of Frictionless Insight, David Stockli of Gameswelt, and Justin Harkin of GameSpy. Its puzzles were described as "difficult" by Harris, as "ingeniously designed" by Edge, and as "cold and abstract" by Harkin. Andrew Blanchard of EAGB Advance believed its sound and music immerses players into the "wonderland" of puzzles, and refused to review the Game Boy Color version, saying the Game Boy Advance version is identical apart from "more levels and superior sound/graphics/animation". Edge commented that the game has an anime style, and that it feels like it was developed in Kyoto rather than Aberdeen. The music was criticised by Tha Wiz of GameZone as "a little repetitive and forgettable", but he liked the variety of game modes.

Tracy Erickson of PocketGamer criticised the iOS version's lack of an online leaderboard, but nevertheless described it as "a highly polished puzzler that provides a good mental workout". Another PocketGamer editor, Jon Mundy, wanted an Android conversion in 2010. Peter Lettieri of TouchArcade agreed with Erickson about the iOS version's lack of an online leaderboard, but complimented the gaily coloured levels and blocks. IGN's Levi Buchanan shared his views on the flamboyant graphics and lack of an online leaderboard. Eurogamer's Kristan Reed described the iOS version's Master Challenges as "insanely smug" and the game itself as "digital crack". He also liked the design simplicity.

A reviewer of PSP Minis described the PlayStation Portable version as "Very cheery" commented that it almost felt like a game show. PocketGamer's Brendan Caldwell believed the Xperia Play version was not built with the device in mind, and that it was meant for touchscreen devices. Despite this, he described Denki Blocks! Deluxe as "an accessible and addictive puzzle game".

Denki Blocks! was recommended on Android by Jeff Marchiafava of Game Informer in 2012.

The Sky Gamestar version was played over a million times in the first six months after its release.

=== Awards ===
Year	Category	Institution or publication	Result	Notes	Ref.
2001	Game of the Show	European Computer Trade Show	Won	Game Boy Advance	
2001	Handheld Game of the Show	European Computer Trade Show	Won	Game Boy Advance	
2002	Mobile Device sponsored by Telecom One	British Academy of Film and Television Arts	Nominated		
