= Quarrel (video game) =

2011 video game

- Developer: Denki
- Publisher: UTV Ignition Entertainment
- Platforms: iOS, Xbox Live Arcade
- Release: Xbox Live Arcade; January 25, 2012 iOS; August 25, 2011
- Genres: Word, Strategy
- Mode: Single player

Quarrel is a video game developed by Denki and published by UTV Ignition Entertainment. It is a word-based strategy game, described as "Scrabble x Risk x Countdown." It was released for iOS devices on August 25, 2011 and for Xbox Live Arcade on January 25, 2012.

== Gameplay ==
In Quarrel, the aim of the game is to take all the territory from the other players. To do this, the player 'invades' neighboring territory and then must make a higher-scoring word than their opponent. Opponents include Dwayne, Caprice, Biff, Troy, Damien, Malik, Rex, Helena, and Kali. Dwayne is the easiest and Kali is the hardest. Each game may have up to three opponents.

=== Scoring ===
As with other word games, letters have individual scores. These range from 1 to 15, and value is based on commonality in spoken-word communications rather than written-word communications.

Letter scores are as follows:

A-M	A-M Value	N-Z	N-Z Value
A	1	N	1
B	5	O	1
C	2	P	3
D	3	Q	15
E	1	R	2
F	5	S	1
G	4	T	1
H	4	U	3
I	1	V	6
J	15	W	5
K	6	X	10
L	2	Y	5
M	4	Z	12

You can also take others' troops.

== Awards ==
- BAFTA Scotland 2011, Best Game
