= Incoming (1998 video game) =

3D shooter game

- European Windows cover art
- Developer: Rage Software
- Publishers: EU: Rage Software; NA: Xicat Interactive (PC); NA: Interplay Entertainment (DC); JP: Imagineer
- Designers: Scott Johnson; Kristian Ramsay-Jones
- Composer: Stephen Lord
- Platforms: Windows, Dreamcast, Arcade
- Release: Windows: UK: April 1998; NA: June 29, 1998; JP: December 17, 1998; Dreamcast: JP: December 17, 1998; NA: September 15, 1999; EU: October 14, 1999; Arcade: NA: 2003
- Genres: Shooter, flight simulator
- Modes: Single-player, multiplayer

Incoming is a 3D shooter video game developed and published by Rage Software. The game was first released for Microsoft Windows in mid-1998, and was followed by a Dreamcast version, which was released in Japan on December 17, 1998, in Europe on October 14, 1999, and in North America on September 15, 1999. Set in the near-future of 2009, the game primarily revolves around controlling vehicles and turrets to fight alien invaders of Earth in one of the campaign modes, the arcade mode, and with or against another player. Some levels include brief real-time strategy segments.

Praised for its then-advanced graphics and sound, the game was generally well-received on the PC, though the critical response was less positive for the Dreamcast version. A sequel entitled Incoming Forces was released in 2002 exclusively for the PC. An arcade version of the game, utilising a unique hardware interface, was released in 2003.

== Gameplay ==
Screenshot of the Arcade game mode

Primarily a vehicle simulation game, the player controls one of a number of possible vehicles in order to complete objectives. The vehicle used could be an aerial craft, defence emplacement, or surface craft, and is usually armed with a primary weapon (with unlimited ammunition) and sometimes secondary weapons (with either a limited or infinite supply). Incoming employs an arcade style; in particular, the logging of high scores and a "life" system.

There are three different game modes. The campaign mode follows the main storyline, in which the player must complete a series of objectives to neutralise the alien threat. Typical goals include transporting cargo and defending allied convoys. Two variants of the campaign exist: "campaign action" purely consists of the simulation missions; "campaign tactics" features the same main missions as campaign action, but with some extra sub-missions. These sub-missions take place in the "tactical display", where the player controls several vehicles and gun emplacements in a similar manner to real-time strategy games.

Either campaign consists of ten missions (referred to as "phases" in the game) in each of the six locations. These locations can also be accessed in the arcade mode. This mode sees the player fight off alien craft while picking up as many power-ups as is possible. The same mechanics apply to the multiplayer mode, with some slight variations depending on the game type selected. Multiplayer is available in split-screen mode on both platforms, in addition to networking and Internet options on the PC version.

== Plot ==
Acknowledged by critics for having a simple storyline, Incoming is set in 2009 over a period of fifteen days. An increasing number of UFO sightings culminate in attacks on the international lunar base and other locations on Earth; and the construction of a base in the Arctic. Secret work is started on an "ADATA" (Anomaly Detection And Tracking Array) near Mount Kilimanjaro. The events of the game take place after an attack on the ADATA facility is initiated by alien forces.

The game is set in six locations: Kenya, defending the ADATA facility; the Arctic, attacking an alien base while defending a human one; the North Atlantic Ocean, where the player must defend oil rigs and attack a second alien base; Florida, where parts of a fleet to invade the alien's Moon base must be defended; the Moon, attacking a further alien base; and a planet in the Crab Nebula, assaulting the planet from which the alien attackers came.

If the player has completed these in the Campaign Action mode, then in addition to these ten missions in each location, there are bonus "virus" scenarios, with one level in each location. Shortly before these missions, the aliens launched four virus bombs which impacted in the four location on Earth the player had previously visited. All buildings in these areas must be destroyed by the player to prevent the virus from spreading further.

A cutscene using the main game engine

== Development ==
Rage Software, developers of Incoming, were known for their cutting-edge graphics and effects. The game utilized the 3dfx technology, and was included in some retail versions of the Voodoo2 graphics card.

While exhibiting the PC version at the September 1997 European Computer Trade Show, Rage Software stated that they were considering a Nintendo 64 version of the game. However, none was ever released.

An arcade version followed in 2003, running on the Vortek V3 Global VR arcade board, utilising the system's unique virtual reality hardware interface.

== Reception ==
Reception

Aggregate score
Aggregator	Score	
Aggregator	Dreamcast	PC
GameRankings	62%	80%

Review scores
Publication	Score	
Publication	Dreamcast	PC
CNET Gamecenter	6/10	7/10
Computer Gaming World	N/A	4/5
Electronic Gaming Monthly	3.83/10	N/A
Famitsu	27/40	N/A
Game Informer	5.5/10	N/A
GameFan	81%	N/A
GamePro	3/5	N/A
GameRevolution	C	N/A
GameSpot	6.7/10	7.8/10
GameSpy	6/10	N/A
IGN	7/10	7/10
Next Generation	N/A	4/5
PC Accelerator	N/A	7/10
PC Gamer (US)	N/A	75%

The Windows version of Incoming was generally well received. In particular, the explosions, similar special effects and cut scenes using the main game engine were noted for their quality. The Dolby Surround-encoded sound was a further source of acclaim. British magazine PC Zone described it as "bloody good", with "some modest simulation elements". The magazine praised the setting of the game, commenting: "A refreshing change from the deep space of most futuristic combat sims, and something which definitely has a positive effect on gameplay." The review concluded by saying that "it's as fun as it looks. Just for once, all those people who don't read reviews and buy games purely on the strength of pretty pictures on the packaging are gonna find themselves playing a very, very enjoyable game." Edge highlighted the game's efficient gameplay mechanics, giving it eight out of ten and stating that designers "managed to produce something more than a lightshow, taking care to fine-tune a design that, if not exactly original, at least does its thing with flair and solid understanding of gameplay."

Next Generation said the game was "definitely an improvement to the action/arcade genre, as well as a visual improvement to the 3D market as a whole. The amount of varied units and different setting give Incoming the commendable originality and replay value that make it a title worth checking out."

Though considering the game "pretty darn tough", IGN praised the game's variety and length. It also praised the sound and graphics, though the latter was a source of criticism: "Incoming's got it all... but it all comes at a high price: getting this game to run on our PCs was one big pain in the butt." Despite calling it "an outstanding-looking and great playing game", IGN only gave the game a "decent" review score because of the system problems. Conversely, GameSpot's review noted none of these hardware issues, praising the visuals as "some of the finest... of any action game." The reviewer, however, described the game design as "strong yet slightly flawed... [it] definitely pulls you in, but leaves a little to be desired as far as keeping you there", complaining that "what [the developer] have presented gets tiresome quickly." The publication summarised the game as "a fine game and a definite must-have for arcade fans... What it lacks is a realization that computer games have moved beyond this simplistic style of gameplay." In December 1998, Arcade noted the game as the best example of the arcade action genre.

The reception was less positive when the game was ported to the Dreamcast. A release title for Sega's console, IGN complained that the graphics were not top-of-the-range at the time of its late 1999 release, with the draw distance being cited as a specific hindrance on gameplay. IGN also said that, although the game "is lacking in many areas, there's more than enough here for the hardcore shooting fans out there to have their requisite blast of shooting action". Though criticizing the graphics' ability to "get in the way at times", the "very vague" mission briefings and the "odd flying model for the planes", the reviewer conceded that "if you're a hardcore shooting fan, and you're looking for a good challenge, you'll probably want to look into Incoming." Jonathan Licata of AllGame gave it three stars out of five, saying, "With the two-player modes falling short due to lack of innovation, Incoming exists as a one-player game for all intents and purposes. When you have completed all of the campaigns in their entirety, the appeal of the game wears very thin." PlanetDreamcast's review was harsher, describing the plot as "the same recycled garbage used in tons of other games of this type", the multiplayer split screen mode as "lame" and the objectives as "mundane". The reviewer also noted graphical issues, clipping problems and poor controls. Though dismissing the graphics as "a bit dated", the reviewer did acknowledge the "nifty special effects" and admitted that "Incoming may be worth a rental... [it] is only slightly better than mediocre." In a rare positive review for the Dreamcast version, Game Vortex described the visuals as "some of the most breathtaking visuals you'll find in any game." Though describing the multiplayer as "fun", it considered "by far, the best [mode to be] Campaign mode". The review concluded by describing the game as "lots of fun and highly recommended". In Japan, where said console version was released under the name Incoming: Jinrui Saishū Kessen (インカミング 人類最終決戦, Inkamingu Jinrui Saishū Kessen; lit. "Incoming: Humanity's Final Showdown"), Famitsu gave it a score of 27 out of 40.
