= Wild Wild Racing =

2000 video game

- North American cover art
- Developer: Rage Software
- Publishers: JP: Imagineer; NA: Interplay Entertainment; PAL: Rage Software
- Designers: Kristian Ramsay-Jones; Paul Wright
- Platform: PlayStation 2
- Release: JP: September 14, 2000; NA: October 26, 2000; EU: November 24, 2000; AU: November 30, 2000
- Genre: Racing
- Modes: Single player, Multiplayer

Wild Wild Racing is an off-road racing game for the PlayStation 2 developed and published by Rage Software.

== Summary ==
It was one of the first games released on the PlayStation 2 and was released on the same day as the console in the US and the PAL region on October 26, 2000, and in November 24, 2000, respectively. Wild Wild Racing allows players to compete in all-terrain vehicle races in various countries around the globe. There are five locations in the game: United States, India, Iceland, Mexico and Australia.

In addition to the off-road racing circuits, Wild Wild Racing includes a series of mini-games that allow the player to upgrade and access new vehicles. These challenges are one of three different types; Quest (find the letters that spell out the name of the next unlockable car around the track), Skill (use your car to push a large ball through a crazy golf style course to the finish line), and Stunt (complete an extreme stunt course including jumps over a series of objects etc.).

Wild Wild Racing was released in all three major territories: Japan, the US and the PAL region.

== Development ==
The game was developed in 15 months with a budget of £400,000.

== Reception ==
Reception

Aggregate score
Aggregator	Score
Metacritic	64/100

Review scores
Publication	Score
Edge	6/10
Electronic Gaming Monthly	6.5/10
EP Daily	5.5/10
Famitsu	29/40
Game Informer	7.5/10
GameFan	(MVS) 83% 62% (Note: In GameFan's viewpoint of the game, three critics gave it each a score of 50, 63, and 74.)
GameRevolution	C
GameSpot	6/10
IGN	7.8/10
Jeuxvideo.com	15/20
Next Generation	3/5
Official U.S. PlayStation Magazine	3/5

The game received "mixed" reviews according to the review aggregation website Metacritic. David Chen of NextGen said, "Next-generation consoles deserve next-generation racers, and while Wild Wild Racing is an enjoyable ride, it doesn't make much of the new hardware." In Japan, Famitsu gave it a score of 29 out of 40.

Human Tornado of GamePro said in one review, "Wild Wild Racing is a good off-road racing game with a decent amount of replay value, but overall it's not as good as it could have been. Still, if you're up for some racing action in the dirt, Wild Wild Racing will give you a run for your money." (Note: GamePro gave the game two 3.5/5 scores for graphics and fun factor, 3/5 for sound, and 4/5 for control in one review.) In another GamePro review, Major Mike said, "WWR isn't a total washout: It does have some cool play modes, such as a stunt track and skill challenge, but, ultimately, WWR is a game that would have benefited from more time in the development shop before release." (Note: GamePro gave the game three 3.5/5 scores for graphics, control, and fun factor, and 3/5 for sound in another review.)
