= Darklight Conflict =

1997 video game

- Developer: Rage Software
- Publisher: Electronic Arts
- Platforms: MS-DOS, PlayStation, Sega Saturn
- Release: MS-DOS: NA: March 28, 1997; EU: 1997; PlayStation: NA: June 25, 1997; EU: June 1997; Saturn: NA: July 1, 1997; EU: July 1997
- Genre: Space combat simulator
- Modes: Single player, multiplayer

Darklight Conflict is a space combat simulator video game developed by Rage Software and published by Electronic Arts in 1997 for the MS-DOS, and the Sega Saturn and Sony PlayStation game consoles. Players take on the part of a contemporary human fighter pilot abducted by the alien Repton species during an aerial battle, and biologically modified to become a starfighter pilot for them in their war against the Evil Ovon race.

== Gameplay ==
Cockpit view (DOS version)

The player pilots one of three different starfighters, each with different strengths and weaknesses, and occasionally a captured enemy ship, or controlling a gun turret on the Mothership (The "War Drum"). The missions include simple combat, defending the mothership, destroying an enemy Ovon mothership, clearing an asteroid field, and retrieving an object with a tractor beam. The player's ship moves between mission areas via "hyperspace portals", passing through a hyper-space environment, resembling that seen in 2001: A Space Odyssey. Often during hyperspace transit, varying streams of energy are encountered; gold energy replenishes the energy which fuels the ship, while blue energy drains it, reducing the ship's effectiveness.

Darklight Conflict has several multiplayer modes, including deathmatch, team battles, and space combat variations of tag and capture the flag.

== Plot ==
After the player character completes the four campaigns and destroys the Ovon home-world for the Reptons, the Reptons send their best pilots to kill the player character. The player character escapes and jumps to Earth, where centuries have passed since the player character left. The ship is greeted by the Earth Defense Fleet, which destroys all Repton ships in hot pursuit.

== Reception ==
Reception

Aggregate score
Aggregator	Score
GameRankings	67% (PS)

Review scores
Publication	Score
AllGame	3/5 (PS); 3/5 (PC)
Electronic Gaming Monthly	6.125/10 (PS)
GameSpot	7.9/10 (PC); 6.6/10 (PS)
Next Generation	2/5 (PS)
PC PowerPlay	89% (PC)
Sega Saturn Magazine	86% (SAT)

Reviewing the MS-DOS version in GameSpot, Greg Kasavin commented, "Darklight Conflict packs a lot of action between its campaign, arcade, and six-player network modes, so it'll keep you occupied for a long, long time. And you can bet you'll be gawking at its visuals all the while." He lauded the peripheral vision afforded by the game's letterboxed display, the high frame rate, the special weapons, the targeting system, the quantity and variety of missions, the sleek rendering of the spaceships, the explosion and lighting effects, and the moody soundtrack. He considered the absence of licensing to be the only flaw, saying the unfamiliarity of the spacecraft makes them harder to get used to and less immediately appealing.

The console versions received a mix of critical reactions, with the one commonality being praise for the lighting effects. Electronic Gaming Monthly's Dan Hsu and Next Generation said the graphics in general are superior to those of the game's closest competitor, the PlayStation version of Wing Commander IV, though the Next Generation reviewer added that they still come as a disappointment compared to the PC version of Darklight Conflict. He and EGM's Crispin Boyer and Sushi-X found the oversensitive controls with no support for analog controllers to be an annoyance which greatly aggravates the already frustrating difficulty; Boyer elaborated that "you're forced to tap, tap, tap until you're on target." GamePro, however, contended that "The control is a bit twitchy at first, but is very solid once you get used to it."

Critics also disagreed about the game's lack of story. Both Sushi-X and Jeff Gerstmann praised this element as enabling better enjoyment of the gameplay, and characterized Wing Commander IV's extensive cutscenes as fluff, while Dan Hsu and Next Generation both felt it hurt the game. Next Generation reasoned, "As excessive and ungameplay-focused as the FMV sequences in Wing Commander IV are, at least they give the player a face to identify with, and maybe even an emotional connection. Darklight Conflict's generic polygonal spaceships offer nothing to involve even the most hyperimaginative."

Critics differed most sharply over the quality of the missions. Boyer, Hsu, and Next Generation all argued that despite the varying objectives, the missions all boil down to the same requisite skills, making for an extremely repetitive gaming experience. In contrast, GamePro and Sega Saturn Magazine praised the variety afforded by the missions, with SSM adding that "the action continues all the way through with some complex and well designed duties".
