= Provocator =

1991 video game

- Developer: Network 23
- Publisher: Computer Tutorial Services
- Platform: Acorn Archimedes
- Release: EU: 1991
- Genre: Shoot 'em up

Provocator is a shoot 'em up video game developed for the Acorn Archimedes range of computers. It was the first game by Network 23 and was published in the summer of 1991 by C.T.S. (Computer Tutorial Services) to critical acclaim.

The game requires the player to protect a massive convoy of space craft as they pass through 32 waves of alien occupied territory. It combines similar game mechanics to Defender with a setting reminiscent of late-1970s TV show Battlestar Galactica.

== Gameplay ==
Several ships in the convoy have forest domes that supply the fleet with food and oxygen. The player is tasked with protecting these domes from alien squadrons that launch increasingly frequent attacks on them. When a dome is under attack, a warning sound alerts the player to the threat and if it isn't met within 15 seconds, the dome is permanently destroyed. If all the forest domes are destroyed, the fate of the convoy is sealed and the game ends.

The game grants the player freedom to move around the convoy at will, but collision with any part of the fleet results in the loss of a life. Familiarity with the convoy layout is paramount to protecting it. Upon completion of a level the player is instructed to carefully dock with the largest ship in the fleet to re-fuel. Once successfully docked, bonus points are awarded for every dome left intact.

A radar at the top of the screen shows the fleet in its entirety, allowing the player to track alien movement and help navigate.

The game's 32 levels are split into 3 acts (or 'phases') Once a phase has been completed, the player is rewarded with a still postcard style snapshot of a ship in the fleet.

The player's ship (which is highly reminiscent of a Colonial Viper) features a turbo thrust and spits out two laser bolts with each press of the fire button, resulting in extremely rapid fire. The convoy ships are shielded against the player's lasers and dissolve them upon impact with an electric particle effect.

Certain alien types escort power-up orbs that when shot upgrade the player's weapon systems.

== Technical information ==
Provocator runs at a consistent 50 frames per second on all Archimedes platforms. The convoy glides over a deep parallax star field. It is 32 screens in width, 2 in height and wrapped as the player passed from one end to another.
