= Microsoft International Soccer 2000 =

1999 video game

- Developer: Rage Software
- Publisher: Microsoft
- Designer: Tony McCabe
- Platform: Windows
- Release: UK: August 27, 1999; NA: December 3, 1999
- Genre: Sports
- Modes: Single-player, multiplayer

Microsoft International Soccer 2000 is a sports game developed by Rage Software and published by Microsoft. It was released in 1999 for Windows. The player takes the role of manager of an international football team in a competition such as the FIFA World Cup or UEFA European Football Championship. The game was developed in conjunction with several football coaches, and released in the United States for $20. Reception of the game was generally positive. Its graphics were rated highest, though reviewers also enjoyed the simplicity of play. However, gameplay aspects such as AI earned a mixed response.

== Gameplay ==
The game contains nine different modes, split into three categories: friendlies, leagues and competitions. Friendly games are non-competitive, leagues provide round-robin and knockout events, while the competitions category contains a variety of competitions such as the FIFA World Cup or UEFA European Football Championship.

Each team has a set lineup, which can be altered by the player. As Rage did not acquire a license from FIFA, footballer names used are fictitious by default. They can be adjusted, as can team outfits, by the player. Footballers can perform all actions common on a football field, such as dribbling, passing, headering, one touch actions doing, and even bicycle kicking. In the US version, commentary is provided by Jonathan Pearce and Ron Atkinson.

Performing an illegal action can result in a foul being committed; it is possible but rare for a footballer to receive a yellow or red card. Slide tackles are most likely to draw a foul, while the steal technique rarely results in an infringement.

== Development ==
Microsoft recruited several English coaches to assist in the development game. They helped Rage develop the AI to use tactics and strategies used in real football. The game was released in the United States for $20.

== Reception ==
Reception

Review scores
Publication	Score
AllGame	4/5
IGN	7.6/10
PC Zone	8.5/10
Sports Gaming Network	86/100

Reception of Microsoft International Soccer 2000 was generally positive.

IGN's Uros Jojic said that the game's design was not unique, and was generally similar to most other games of the genre, with "Classic Matches" the only exception. He complained that the game included no clubs, due to the lack of a FIFA license. Sports Gaming Network's Eric Dysinger agreed that the game's interface was simple but effective. Allgame's Nick Woods said that the controls were generally easy to learn, but that it was a times difficult to select the footballer the player wishes to control—he said it was possible to adjust to the controls, "but it's not an intuitive or easy task".

The game's graphics were rated highly by reviewers. IGN said the sky textures were beautiful and "the grass textures of the pitch look extremely realistic". However, reviewer Jojic was less receptive of other features such as the stadium and crowd effects, which he said sometimes lacked detail. He also said the game's animations were "a mixed bag". Dysinger said the background graphics were of a high quality, stating the game presents "the best fields and stadiums to play in". PC Zone's review was more positive; it said Microsoft International Soccer 2000 is "arguably ... the best looking of the current crop of football games". Audio, however, was not rated as highly. The commentary had a mediocre reception—PC Zone wrote that "Ron Atkinson ... sounds as if he is reading from a script", while Sports Gaming Network complained that "frequently the announcers were broadcasting the play by play when the play was already over". IGN, while approving of the commentary, said the music was "weak and uninspiring", while Dysinger said it was good, but repetitive.

Gameplay earned a mixed reception from different reviewers. Sports Gaming Network complained of some lag in game, with footballers not responding to commands until after the AI had passed the ball on. Dysinger was also critical of the lack of FIFA license, which forced players to learn the strengths and weaknesses of different nations as they did not have a real roster. PC Zone was more positive; the game was described as "straightforward arcade stuff, making for an exciting game of football". The high paced gameplay was likened to Sensible World of Soccer. IGN rated the gameplay highly, especially the "phenomenal" ball physics, which Jojic described as "the most realistic interpretation of ball movement I've seen in any soccer game so far". However, he noted several glitches in the AI which made the game easier at times. GameSpy, on the other hand, said the AI was "highly sophisticated".
