= Network 23 (company) =

Defunct British video game development company

Network 23 was a British video game developer founded by teenagers Chris Lloyd and Russell Hughes in 1990. Located on the Isle of Wight, they produced games exclusively for the Acorn Archimedes range of computers from 1990 to 1996.

The studio's name was derived from the dominant mega-corporation Network 23, featured in Channel 4's 1985 short film ’20 Minutes into the Future’ (aka Max Headroom).

== History ==
Network 23 were well known within the Archimedes demoscene from 1987 to 1990. Their best known releases from this time included ‘Wibble’, ‘Granny Chow’ and ‘Graffiti Street’.

The company changed its name to R.A.G.E. Software Developments with the launch of its first commercial game ‘Provocator’ in 1991, but reverted to its demoscene name in 1992 to avoid confusion with the newly formed Amiga games developer Rage Software Limited.

Network 23's graphic style was influenced by the Amiga games of the day, especially those of the Bitmap Brothers and Team17. The graphics were designed using Deluxe Paint on an Amiga 500 and ported to the Acorn using custom hardware, which gave the company's games a distinctive look. The Archimedes games market gradually declined as the 90s progressed, and the company closed in November 1996.

Chris Lloyd went into business software and became an independent I.T. consultant. He wrote the Archimedes emulator ‘Archie’ in his spare time, but stopped work on the project in 2001 due to time constraints.

Russell Hughes stayed within the video game industry, working on titles including Carmageddon and State of Emergency. He subsequently worked in Melbourne, Australia as an artist for Blue Tongue Entertainment and THQ Asia Pacific. He died at the age of 37 on 22 September 2010.

== Games ==
Provocator

Network 23's first published game, ‘Provocator’, was released in September 1991 and published by Isle of Wight developer Computer Tutorial Services (C.T.S). Provocator was a fast-paced, space- based shoot 'em up, reminiscent of the Battlestar Galactica TV show from the late 70s. It required the player to protect a large convoy of ships from alien attack as they passed through hostile territory, and to dock with a mother ship after each wave of attacks.

Warlocks

Released in late October 1993, Warlocks became Network 23's most successful game. It was a platform shoot-em-up featuring a reincarnated knight tasked with freeing the world of Lylvania from the tyranny of 3 demented Warlocks. Advertising for Warlocks claimed that it was the only Acorn game to feature 8 directional, 256 colour, parallax scrolling whilst running at a consistent 50 frames per second.

Deadline

Network 23's last game was Deadline, a top- down shoot-em-up published in August 1995, in which the player's mission was to rescue hostages from 8 war- torn battlegrounds.
