= UEFA Striker =

1999 video game

- Developer: Rage Software
- Publisher: Infogrames
- Series: Striker
- Platforms: PlayStation, Dreamcast
- Release: PlayStation: EU: 22 October 1999; NA: April 2000; Dreamcast: EU: 22 October 1999; JP: 6 April 2000; NA: 15 May 2000
- Genre: Sports video game
- Modes: Single-player, multiplayer

UEFA Striker, known in North America as Striker Pro 2000, is a sports video game developed by Rage Software and published by Infogrames in 1999-2000. It is the final game in the Striker series following the cancellation of its sequel, UEFA 2001, the following year.

== Gameplay ==
The game allows players to choose from 51 European national teams, 44 domestic clubs and 20 "bonus teams", with individual players modelled with 16 different attributes. Players also have the ability to create their own teams and kits, edit existing players and edit the names of existing cups and leagues. Game modes include training, friendly matches, knockout cups, classic matches, leagues and tournaments. The UEFA licence enabled the inclusion of official Euro 2000 qualifying matches and the final tournament as a game mode, but other major cups and leagues are "cunningly disguised" with names such as the Euro Super Trophy standing in for the Champions League. Commentary is provided by Ron Atkinson and Jonathan Pearce, with Ruud Gullit providing analysis before international fixtures.

== Development ==
Julian Widdows, a producer at Rage Software, told Dreamcast Monthly magazine that the team's intention was to "create something that felt like real football" and to allow players to "be able to draw the defenders the same way you do in real life, to make space and to make moves". The title was initially developed under the title Ruud Gullit's Striker, with Ruud Gullit involved on a "consultancy basis" and providing commentary, but this shifted when the UEFA licence was acquired.

In June 1999, German magazine MAN!AC reported that Rage Software was prioritising development of the PlayStation version, while the Dreamcast version remained at an early stage. The Dreamcast version was designed to feature player models containing four times as many polygons as their PlayStation counterparts, alongside more varied facial features, hairstyles and animated spectators. Motion capture for the game involved a professional footballer from the English Premier League.

In France, Lilian Thuram, a member of France's 1998 FIFA World Cup-winning team, promoted UEFA Striker in an interview with Dreamcast: Le Magazine Officiel in December 1999. Thuram explained that he had played the game during its development and praised its character models and realism, joking that his virtual counterpart was better at scoring goals than he was.

== Reception ==
Reception

Aggregate score
| Aggregator | Score | |
| Aggregator | Dreamcast | PS |
|---|---|---|
| GameRankings | 74% | 77% |

Review scores
| Publication | Score | |
| Publication | Dreamcast | PS |
|---|---|---|
| CNET Gamecenter | 7/10 | N/A |
| Computer and Video Games | N/A | 4/5 |
| Electronic Gaming Monthly | 7/10 | N/A |
| Famitsu | 24/40 | N/A |
| Game Informer | 6.75/10 | N/A |
| GameSpot | 6.6/10 | 6.6/10 |
| IGN | 7/10 | 7.2/10 |
| Jeuxvideo.com | 14/20 | 12/20 |
| PlayStation Official Magazine – UK | N/A | 8/10 |
| Official U.S. PlayStation Magazine | N/A | 4/5 |

The PlayStation version received favourable reviews, while the Dreamcast version received average reviews, according to the review aggregation website GameRankings. In Japan, where the latter was ported and published by Imagineer on 6 April 2000 under the name Super Euro Soccer 2000 (スーパーユーロサッカー2000, Sūpā Yūro Sakkā 2000), Famitsu gave it a score of 24 out of 40.

European reviews of the Dreamcast version were mixed. In the United Kingdom, Computer and Video Games awarded the game four out of five stars, praising its range of gameplay options. French magazine Player One gave it 70%, praising its graphics, fluid animation and accessible gameplay while criticising its repetitive commentary and limited longevity. Germany's MAN!AC awarded it 84%, highlighting its enjoyable gameplay and accessible controls. Italian magazine Dreamcast Arena gave it 8 out of 10, praising its graphics, animation and variety of game modes, but criticising its imprecise controls and the difficulty of scoring against goalkeepers. Spain's Revista Oficial Dreamcast was less enthusiastic, awarding it 6 out of 10 and criticising the difficulty of scoring goals while acknowledging the game's range of European competitions.

== Cancelled sequel ==
A follow-up, UEFA 2001, was announced for the Dreamcast in 2000, but was cancelled in October 2000 when Infogrames re-evaluated their support for the console, and the game was never released on any platform.
