= Rage Software =

British video game developer

Rage Software plc
- Type: Public company
- Industry: Video games
- Predecessor: Special FX Software
- Founded: 1992; 34 years ago
- Founder: Paul Finnegan
- Defunct: 2003
- Fate: Bankrupt
- Headquarters: Liverpool, England, UK

Rage Software plc (formerly Rage Games Limited) was a British video game developer founded in Liverpool in 1992 by Paul Finnegan.

== History ==
=== Origins ===
The company first made its start in early 1992 when members of the Ocean Software-affiliated Special FX Software broke up to become an independent game developer/publisher and later renamed it to Rage Software, with studios serving Liverpool and Newcastle.

Rage's first title Striker sold 700,000 copies by 1995, and established Rage as a major creative force in the interactive entertainment industry. The company went through rapid expansion in the 1990s and partnered with multiple third party software publishers for distribution of its titles.

In 1994, Bristol Coin Equipment acquired both Rage Software and Software Creations, the transaction was closed a month later. In 1995, the company purchased Denton Designs, and absorbed its talent into Rage Software itself. In 1996, BCE took the Rage name and a year later sold Software Creations to Sweeplink Ltd.

=== Expand through publishing and acquisition ===
In 1997, the decision was made to publish its productions independently. Rage continued to form commercial partnerships with major publishing houses, including Microsoft, Intel, Dell, Compaq, Nintendo, Sony and Sega, and re-registered as a private company as Rage Software Limited in 1999. In October 1999, the company purchased Digital Image Design from Infogrames UK and renamed it Rage Warrington.

In January 2000, it invested in the newly established Internet Indirect Plc, a company supporting the development of technology and internet companies; through this move, Rage hoped to use the company's research in its titles. The company also acquired Bristol-based designer Wayward Design.

Nearly a month later, Rage acquired two newly established studios located in Scotland, appointing David Jones, a video game industry veteran and creator of the GTA series, as its manager. The company cited its desire to develop games using WAP technology and expand into the mobile market. It also acquired RGB Tree Limited, the studio responsible for the PlayStation port of GTA2, and acquired a 20% stake in the newly established Denki Limited, based in Dundee . As part of this agreement, Rage gained the rights to produce and publish three Game Boy titles. The company later launched Wild Wild Racing in 2000.

Rage announced the launch of an online division, Rage On-Line, which would provide a platform for players to download new content for their games; and would allow them to purchase new titles through an online store. This acquisitions and expansion cemented Rage as the fourth largest European video game publisher, behind Infogrames, Eidos Interactive and Titus Software at that time in revenue.

In 1999, the company signed a partnership with Interplay to distribute its titles in North America. In 2000, the company signed an expanded distribution and publishing deal with Interplay Entertainment, where Interplay handled North American rights to titles that was published by Rage Software.

In February 2001, it signed an agreement with Nokia to produce games for the Finnish manufacturer's phones, while in March a 4-year agreement was concluded with Manchester United to use David Beckham's name for marketing purposes (he was to help promote the returning Striker series); and in April, Metro-Goldwyn-Mayer granted a license to produce titles based on the Rocky film series.

In June 2001, the studio secured a £20 million loan after discovering it had only £500,000 left in its account. A portion of the £15 million loan was to be transferred to the company on the condition that, after the loan was repaid, GEM Global Yield Fund would receive 76% of the studio's shares. Studio CEO Paul Finnegan stated that the studio plans for the next two years to allocate "no more than half of this amount" to promoting Rage titles, acquiring further licenses, and pursuing a full commitment to a self-publishing strategy. At that time, the company employed 260 people in 4 studios: Newcastle, Bristol, Warrington, Birmingham.

In October, Rage announced that it would be developing games for Nintendo's GameCube console, and in December, it partnered with former SAS member and Gulf War I participant Andy McNab. He would serve as creative and technical director for military games based on his work. The writer admitted that he was positively surprised by the quality of the studio's titles; this collaboration was intended to ensure authenticity and detail in the titles being developed. Meanwhile, a title featuring David Beckham failed to hit the shelves.

In December 2001, the company entered into a publishing agreement with Majesco Entertainment where Majesco would have published Rage's titles in the North American market.

=== Trouble and bankruptcy ===
In March 2002, it was revealed that the company had suffered further financial losses resulting from the difficulties of the publishing division in establishing itself on the market and the high costs of running it; a month later, the situation worsened due to the falling share price on the stock exchange and unsatisfactory sales of the game with David Beckham in the title.

At E3 2002, Rage announced a three-year agreement with Lamborghini, which would see the company develop a series of games featuring Lamborghini cars. The first title in the series was scheduled for release in spring 2003.

David Jones bought the studio in Dundee and soon after opened Realtime Worlds; Phil Wright did the same with the studio in Sheffield, creating Yeti Studios (responsible for the PC version of Gun Metal).

In the summer, the company earned GBP 4.5 million, which it invested in the development of titles in production, but (according to Hunter Kelly) delays in delivering them to the market meant that the company, with insufficient revenue, was unable to cover the company's operating costs on time, and immediately dismissed 74 employees.

In October, Trevor Williams left his position as chairman of Rage Birmingham to set up Swordfish Studios with Joan Finnegan (Paul Finnegan's wife), and then bought the division he had previously managed from Rage.

Despite strong sales of the David Beckham game during the 2002 holiday season, Rage shares fell by 67% on January 13, 2003. The company suspended share sales the next day and officially declared bankruptcy on January 16. The company's assets were auctioned off, and the remaining 82 employees left, finding employment in other development studios, including those established on the former Rage property.

The other executives of Rage went on to form new companies, like Juice Games in Warrington, and Venom Games in Newcastle.

== Studios and subsidiaries ==
- Wayward Design – founded in 1994, acquired in January 2000
- Rage Warrington (formerly Digital Image Design) – founded 1989, acquired October 1999
- Rage Scotland – founded in June 2000 by David Jones; based in Edinburgh and Dundee; sold in 2002 (Note: The studio's press releases use the name Rage Scotland; although in some sources the Edinburgh and Dundee offices are referred to separately as Rage Dundee and Rage Edinburgh.)
- Rage Newcastle – founded in 1993 by Peter Johnson
- Rage Leeds (formerly RGB Tree Ltd.) – founded in 1982 (as Smithson Computing, then WJS Design and finally in January 1995 as Sunrise Games); acquired in February 2000; closed due to the studio's consolidation with the Rage Sheffield branch in June 2001
- Rage Huddersfield (formerly Caffeine Studios Ltd. and The Internet Football Club Ltd) – founded October 1996; acquired April 2000; closed June 2001
- Rage Sheffield – founded in October 1999 by former Gremlin Interactive employees led by Phil Wright; sold in August 2002
- Rage Birmingham – founded in 1994 by Trevor Williams, in 2002 it was bought by its founder. (Note: Some websites report that the studio was acquired by Rage Software for £1 shortly after its founding. After Rage's demise, the company became independent.)
- Rage London – closed after 1998

== Games developed ==
List of games developed or published by Rage Software
Title	Release details	Platform(s)				
Title	Release details	Microsoft	Nintendo	Sega	Sony	Others
Striker	Genre: Sports; Publishers: Rage Software & others (see List of Striker ports); Release date: 1992 to 1999 (see List of Striker ports)	MS-DOS	SNES	Mega Drive/Genesis, Game Gear		Atari ST, Amiga, CD32
Ultimate Soccer	Genre: Sports; Publishers: Sega, Tectoy; Release date: 1993			Mega Drive/Genesis, Master System, Game Gear		
World Soccer '94: Road to Glory	Genre: Sports; Publisher: Atlus; Release date: 1993		SNES			
Power Drive	Genre: Racing; Publisher: U.S. Gold; Release date: 1994	MS-DOS	SNES	Mega Drive/Genesis, Game Gear		Amiga, CD32
Striker Pro	Genre: Sports; Release date: 1994					CD-i
World Cup Striker	Genre: Sports; Release date: 1994		SNES			
Power Drive Rally	Genre: Racing; Publisher: Time Warner Interactive; Release date: 1995					Jaguar
Revolution X (all ports)	Genre: Shooting gallery; Publishers: Acclaim Entertainment; Release date: 1995	MS-DOS	SNES	Mega Drive/Genesis, Saturn	PlayStation	
Striker '95	Genre: Sports; Publisher: Time Warner Interactive; Release date: 1995	MS-DOS				
Striker – World Cup Special	Genre: Sports; Publisher: Panasonic; Release date: 1995					3DO
FIFA Soccer 97	Genre: Sports; Publisher: EA Sports; Release date: 1996		SNES			
Striker '96	Genre: Sports; Publisher: Acclaim Entertainment; Release date: 1996	MS-DOS, Windows			PlayStation	
AYSO Soccer '97	Genre: Sports; Publisher: GameTek, Inc.; Release date: March 1997	Windows				
Darklight Conflict	Genre: Space combat simulator; Publisher: Electronic Arts; Release date: 1997	MS-DOS, Windows		Saturn	PlayStation	
Doom (Sega Saturn port)	Genre: First-person shooter; Publisher: GT Interactive; Release date: 1997			Saturn		
Jonah Lomu Rugby	Genre: Sports; Publisher: Codemasters; Release date: PlayStation: 31 March 1997; MS-DOS & Saturn: September 1997			Saturn	PlayStation	
Trash It	Genre: Puzzle-platformer; Publisher: GT Interactive; Release date: 10 July 1997	MS-DOS		Saturn	PlayStation	
Dead Ball Zone	Genre: Sports; Publisher: GT Interactive; Release date: 23 April 1998				PlayStation	
Incoming	Genre: Shooter, Flight simulator; Publishers: EU: Rage Software; NA: Xicat Interactive (PC); NA: Interplay Entertainment (DC); JP: Imagineer; Release date: Windows; EU: 23 March 1998; JP: 23 March 1998; NA: 29 June 1998; Dreamcast; JP: 17 December 1998; NA: 15 September 1999; EU: 14 October 1999	Windows		Dreamcast		
Jeff Wayne's The War of the Worlds	Genre: Real-time strategy; Publisher: GT Interactive; Release date: EU: 10 February 1998; NA: 22 December 1998	Windows				
Microsoft International Soccer 2000	Genre: Sports; Publisher: Microsoft; Release date: UK: 27 August 1999; NA: 3 December 1999	Windows				
Millennium Soldier: Expendable	Genre: Run and Gun; Publishers: JP: Imagineer; NA: Infogrames North America; EU: Infogrames Multimedia; Release date: Windows; JP: 28 May 1999; NA: 1999; EU: 1999; Dreamcast; JP: 24 June 1999; NA: 9 September 1999; EU: 14 October 1999; PlayStation; NA: 25 April 2000; EU: 2000	Windows		Dreamcast	PlayStation	
UEFA Striker	Genre: Sports; Publisher: Infogrames; Release date: PlayStation; EU: 22 October 1999; NA: April 2000; Dreamcast; EU: 22 October 1999; NA: 15 May 2000			Dreamcast	PlayStation	
Space Debris	Genre: Action; Publisher: Sony Interactive Entertainment; Release date: 2000				PlayStation	
Wild Wild Racing	Genre: Racing; Publishers: JP: Imagineer; NA: Interplay Entertainment; EU: Rage Software; Release date: JP: 14 September 2000; NA: 26 October 2000; EU: 24 November 2000; AU: 30 November 2000				PlayStation 2	
Rage Rally	Genre: Racing; Publishers: Rage Software, Global Software Publishing Ltd.; Release date: 2000	Windows				
David Beckham Soccer (all versions except GBA)	Genre: Sports; Developers: Rage Software, Yoyo Entertainment, Majesco; Release date: PlayStation; EU: 23 November 2001; NA: June 2002; Game Boy Color; EU: 8 February 2002; PlayStation 2, Xbox; EU: 7 June 2002	Xbox	Game Boy Color		PlayStation, PlayStation 2	
Denki Blocks	Genre: Puzzle; Publishers: EU: Rage Software; US: Majesco; Developers: Denki, Covert Operations; Release date: Game Boy Color; EU: 18 October 2001; Game Boy Advance; EU: 18 October 2001; US: 2002		Game Boy Color, Game Boy Advance			
e-Racer	Genre: Racing; Release date: EU: 27 April 2001; NA: 30 April 2001	Windows				
Eurofighter Typhoon	Genre: Flight simulator; Publishers: EU: Rage Software; NA: Take-Two Interactive; Release date: EU: 4 May 2001; NA: 24 July 2001	Windows				
Global Touring Challenge: Africa	Genre: Racing; Publishers: EU: Rage Software; NA: Majesco; Release date: EU: 16 November 2001; NA: 11 June 2002				PlayStation 2	
Hostile Waters	Genre: Strategy game; Publishers: EU: Rage Software; NA: Interplay Entertainment; Release date: EU: 23 March 2001; NA: 12 June 2001	Windows				
Off-Road Redneck Racing	Genre: Racing; Publishers: EU: Rage Software; NA: Interplay Entertainment; Release date: EU: 16 March 2001; NA: 1 May 2001	Windows				
Pocket Music	Genre: Music; Developer: Jester Interactive; Release date: 26 April 2002		Game Boy Color, Game Boy Advance			
Go! Go! Beckham! Adventure on Soccer Island	Genre: Sports; Developer: Denki; Release date: 2002		Game Boy Advance			
Gun Metal	Genre: Shooting, Flight simulator; Publishers: Xbox; EU: Rage Games; NA: Majesco; Windows; EU: Zoo Digital; NA: Strategy First; Release date: Xbox; EU: 28 June 2002; NA: 1 August 2002; Windows; EU: 19 September 2003; NA: 26 May 2005	Windows, Xbox				
Incoming Forces	Genre: Shooter; Publisher: Hip Interactive; Release date: EU: 8 March 2002; NA: 25 September 2002	Windows				
Midnight GT	Genre: Racing; Publishers: Rage Software, Funbox Media, Global Software Publishing Ltd.; Release date: 2002	Windows				
Mobile Forces	Genre: First-person shooter; Publishers: Majesco, Sold Out software; Developers: Rage Software, Real Time Worlds; Release date: EU: 31 May 2002; NA: 16 August 2002	Windows				
Rocky	Genre: Fighting; Publishers: EU: Rage Software; NA: Ubi Soft; Release date: 2002	Xbox	GameCube, Game Boy Advance		PlayStation 2	
Totaled!	Genre: Racing; Publishers: EU: Rage Games; NA: Majesco; Release date: Xbox; EU: 7 June 2002; NA: 30 July 2002; PlayStation 2; EU: 27 September 2002	Xbox			PlayStation 2	
Twin Caliber	Genre: Shooter; Release date: 1 November 2002				PlayStation 2	
Rolling	Genre: Sports; Publisher: SCi Games; Release date: 2003	Xbox			PlayStation 2	
Lamborghini	Genre: Racing; Publisher: Majesco; Release date: Unreleased	Xbox			PlayStation 2	

== See also ==
- Network 23 (company)
