= Red heat =

Practice of using colours to determine the temperature of metal

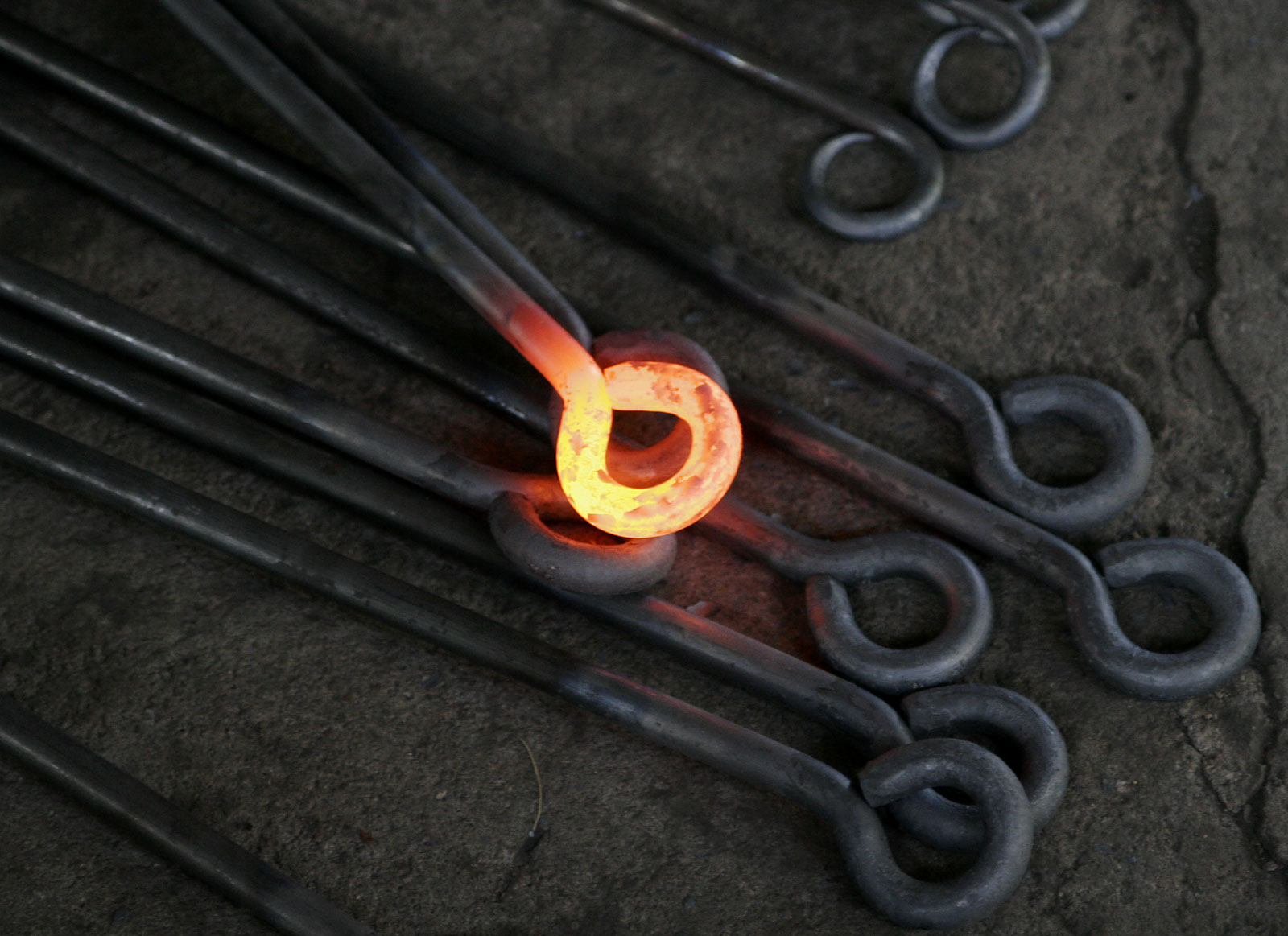
Thermal radiation in visible light can be seen on this hot metalwork.

In blacksmithing, red heat is the practice of using colours to determine the temperature of a piece of metal (usually iron or steel). Long before thermometers were widely available, it was necessary to know what state the metal was in for heat treating it, and the only way to do this was to heat it up to a colour which was known to be best for the work.

The peak wavelength and total radiated amount vary with temperature according to Wien's displacement law. Although this shows relatively high temperatures, the same relationships hold true for any temperature down to absolute zero. Visible light is between 380 and 750 nm.

== Chapman ==
According to Chapman's Workshop Technology, the colours which can be observed in steel are:

Colour	Temperature [°C]		Temperature [°F]	
Colour	From	To	From	To
Black red (Note: When viewed in dull light.)	426	593	799	1,100
Very dark red	594	704	1,100	1,299
Dark red	705	814	1,300	1,497
Cherry red	815	870	1,498	1,598
Light cherry red	871	981	1,599	1,798
Orange	982	1,092	1,799	1,998
Yellow	1,093	1,258	1,999	2,296
Yellow white	1,259	1,314	2,297	2,397
White	1,315+		2,397+	

== Stirling ==
In 1905, Stirling Consolidated Boiler Company published a slightly different set of values:

Colour	Temperature [°C]	Temperature [°F]
Red: Just visible	525	977
Dull red	699	1,290
Dull cherry red	800	1,470
Full cherry red	900	1,650
Clear cherry red	1,000	1,830
Deep orange	1,100	2,010
Clear orange	1,200	2,190
White heat	1,300	2,370
White bright	1,400	2,550
White dazzling	1,500	2,730

== See also ==
- Black-body radiation
- Color temperature
- Incandescence
