= Striker '96 =

1996 video game

- Developer: Rage Software
- Publisher: Acclaim Entertainment: EU: Warner Interactive Entertainment (PS)
- Platforms: PlayStation, MS-DOS, Saturn, Windows
- Release: MS-DOS: WW: 1996; PlayStation: UK: February, 1996; NA: 1996; Saturn: NA: May 31, 1996; PAL: July 1996
- Genre: Sports

Striker is an association football video game developed by Rage Software and published in 1996 by Acclaim Entertainment for the Saturn, PlayStation, and MS-DOS.

== Gameplay ==
Striker was the only soccer video game at the time that featured five-on-five play for both indoor and outdoor soccer matches. Commentary is provided by Andy Gray.

== Reception ==
Next Generation reviewed the Saturn version of the game, rating it one star out of five, and stated that "Frankly, there are far too many good soccer games on store shelves to even think about Striker as an option."

GameSpot gave the PC version of the game 7.4/10.
