= Red Heat (video game) =

1989 video game

- Developer: Special FX
- Publisher: Ocean Software
- Platforms: Amiga; Amstrad CPC; Atari ST; Commodore 64; ZX Spectrum
- Release: EU: 1989
- Genre: Beat 'em up
- Mode: Single-player

Red Heat is a beat 'em up video game based on the 1988 film of the same name. It was developed by British studio Special FX and published by Ocean Software. It was released in Europe in 1989, for Amiga, Amstrad CPC, Atari ST, Commodore 64 (C64), and ZX Spectrum.

In 1991, Red Heat received a budget re-release for Amiga, Commodore 64, and ZX Spectrum published through Ocean's budget label, The Hit Squad.

== Gameplay ==
Red Heat is a beat 'em up game based on the film of the same name. The player controls Russian Moscow Militia captain Ivan Danko, who must stop drug kingpin Viktor Rostavili. The game takes place across four levels, starting with a Russian sauna where Danko must engage in hand combat against enemies. The player has a gun and limited ammunition for the next three levels, which take place in a hospital, a hotel, and a goods yard. In the final level, the player faces off against Rostavili. The gameplay occupies only the middle portion of the screen for a cinematic widescreen effect.

Various subgames are also played throughout the main game, each with their own objective. One subgame has the player trying to break apart a hot rock using only Danko's hand. In a different subgame, the player must put a torn dollar bill back together. Another subgame has the player shoot enemies who pop out of closed doors.

== Reception ==
Reception

Review scores
Publication	Score
Crash	74% (ZX Spectrum)
Computer and Video Games	74% (C64 re-release); 79% (ZX Spectrum re-release)
Sinclair User	78/100 (ZX Spectrum)
Your Sinclair	85/100 (ZX Spectrum)
Zzap!64	62% (Amiga); 65% (C64)
Amiga Power	10% (Amiga re-release)
Commodore Format	38% (C64 re-release)
CU Amiga	82% (C64); 53% (Amiga re-release)
Datormagazin	4/10 (Amiga); 3/10 (C64)
The Games Machine	69% (Amiga); 50% (C64); 52% (ZX Spectrum)
ST Format	52% (Atari ST)

Red Heat received praise for its graphics. The Games Machine noted the black-and-white color scheme of the ZX Spectrum version, but wrote "there's plenty of attention to graphic detail". Sinclair User also praised the graphics despite being monochrome. Richard Eddy of Crash cited the "serious lack of colour" as the game's only letdown.

Mark Patterson of CU Amiga-64 stated that Red Heat "isn't the best game ever to come out of Ocean, but it's by no means the worst," calling it an enjoyable game that was "marred slightly by a lack of variety on the main levels." Gary Barrett of ST Format considered the film good but stated that it did not translate into a good game. Reviewers for Zzap!64 found the gameplay to be repetitive.

The Games Machine criticized the difficulty and stated that the game would only appeal to fans of beat 'em up games. Some criticized the limited fighting moves, and Ken Simpson of Australian Commodore and Amiga Review criticized the joystick control. Your Sinclair praised the subgames for adding variety, but criticized the limited size of the screen. Some critics praised the music. However, Patterson opined that the music and sound effects were good but "certainly not outstanding." Barrett stated that the sound effects were good, and described the music as "tolerable".

Several critics reviewed the game's re-release. Paul Rand of Computer and Video Games stated that the game "didn't exactly set the world on fire" during its initial release, but as a budget game "it's a bit of an eye-opener, with big, fast sprites and a reasonable level of difficulty." Rand called it "an above average interpretation of a great movie," and wrote about the cinematic display, "Not only does this add atmosphere to Red Heat, it also allows for some pretty huge graphics to shift about at a fair old pace." Commodore Format praised the graphics, but found the gameplay tedious and annoying. Fiona Keating of CU Amiga mentioned that the game "has a fairly high" difficulty level. Keating stated that the graphics "have an effective cinematic feel" and concluded that Red Heat "will appeal to those looking for a beat 'em up with a mean right hook, but not much else." Stuart Campbell, writing for New Computer Express and Amiga Power, criticized various aspects of the game and stated that it had no redeeming features.
