= Super Sidekicks (video game) =

1992 video game

- Developer: SNK
- Publisher: SNK
- Producer: Eikichi Kawasaki
- Designers: Eri Koujitani; J. Mikami; Masato Miyoshi
- Composers: Yoko Osaka; Yoshihiko Kitamura
- Series: Super Sidekicks
- Platforms: Arcade, Neo Geo AES, Neo Geo CD
- Release: JP: December 14, 1992; NA: December 1992; Neo Geo AES: WW: February 19, 1993; Neo Geo CD: JP: March 31, 1995; NA: October 1996
- Genre: Sports
- Modes: Single-player, multiplayer
- Arcade system: Neo Geo MVS

Super Sidekicks (Note: Also known as Tokuten Ou (Japanese: 得点王, Hepburn: Tokuten Ō; lit. "Goal-Scoring King") in Japan) is a 1992 association football video game developed and published by SNK for the Neo Geo arcade and home platforms. It is the first installment in the eponymous series and the second soccer game released for the Neo Geo after Soccer Brawl (1991). Featuring an arcade-style approach to soccer compared to other games released at the time, the title allows players to choose any of the available game modes with AI-controlled opponents or other human players with the team of their choosing. Its gameplay uses a simplified two-button configuration.

Headed by Eikichi Kawasaki, Super Sidekicks was developed by most of the same team that worked on several projects for the Neo Geo platforms at SNK. Originally launched for the MVS hardware, the game was later released for both Neo Geo AES and Neo Geo CD, as well as through download services for various consoles. The title proved popular among players and garnered positive reception from critics; praise was directed towards the graphic presentation and fast gameplay, while criticism was directed towards several aspects. It was followed by various sequels and a remake.

== Gameplay ==
Arcade version screenshot showcasing a match between Germany and Spain

Super Sidekicks is a soccer game that is played from a top-down perspective in a two-dimensional environment with sprites. Although it follows the same gameplay as with other soccer titles at the time and most of the rules are present as well, the game opts for a more arcade-styled approach of the sport instead of being full simulation, using a simplified control scheme. The tile features 12 teams divided into two groups which compete for the "SNK Cup": Group A (Germany, Italy, Spain, England, Mexico, Japan) and Group B (Argentina, Holland, Brazil, France, United States, South Korea).

The player's team gets to play against all five other teams in their group. Should the player's team do well in the group stage, they advance to the elimination stage to play the semifinals, followed by the final to win the cup. There is a hidden mechanic in the game that affects single-player matches. During a free kick for the AI opponent, if the player has tapped button A for player two, the AI performs a short-shot while pressing the button A performs a longer kick. One noted mistake was that Spain's kit resembles Portugal's, which would not be featured until future entries. Another mistake is Mexico's uniform color, which was corrected in the sequels.

== Development and release ==
Super Sidekicks was the second soccer game developed for the Neo Geo MVS after Soccer Brawl, being created by most of the same team that worked on multiple projects for the Neo Geo platforms at SNK such as Ghost Pilots and Alpha Mission II. Producer Eikichi Kawasaki headed its creation, with Kenji "Ishimotti" Ishimoto acting as designer. Shinsekai Gakkyoku Zatsugidan members Yoshihiko "Jojouha Kitapy" Kitamura and Yoko Osaka handled the sound design. Masato "Mioshi" Miyoshi, "S K", "Younger Face", Eri Koujitani, J. Mikami and Mori-P were responsible for the pixel art. Programmers under the pseudonym "Mabushi", "Narutaki" and "EP82boy" were in charge of coding. Other members collaborated in its development. The SNK staff wanted to translate the spectacle and action of their fighting games into soccer.

Super Sidekicks was first released by SNK for the Neo Geo MVS on December 14, 1992, and was then released for Neo Geo AES on February 19, 1993. It was showcased at the 1993 IMA show in Frankfurt. The game was later re-released for the Neo Geo CD in Japan on March 31, 1995, and later in North America in October 1996. In 2010, a version by M2 for the NEOGEO Station service was published by SNK Playmore on PlayStation Network. The title is available as one of the 20 pre-loaded games with the Neo Geo X. Hamster Corporation re-released the game as part of their ACA Neo Geo series for the PlayStation 4, Xbox One, Nintendo Switch, Windows, Android and iOS. The title was also recently included in the international version of the Neo Geo mini, the Neo Geo Arcade Stick Pro plug and play game device and the Neo Geo MVSX table top.

== Reception ==
Contemporary reception

Aggregate score
Aggregator	Score
GameRankings	75%

Review scores
Publication	Score
AllGame	2.5/5
Consoles +	90%
Electronic Gaming Monthly	6.5/10
GameFan	317/400
Computer+Videogiochi	80/100
Consolemania	90/100
HobbyConsolas	93/100
Joypad	94%
Megablast	68%
Mega Fun	85%
Play Time	81%
Player One	95%
Video Games	71%

Super Sidekicks garnered positive reception from players and critics. In Japan, Game Machine listed Super Sidekicks on their March 1, 1993 issue as being the fourth most-popular arcade game at the time. RePlay reported Super Sidekicks to be the tenth most-popular arcade game at the time. Marc Menier and Robert Barbe of Consoles + criticized the presentation but praised the graphics, animations, sound design, playability and longevity, also stating that Super Sidekicks recreates the frenzied atmosphere of football matches. Christophe Delpierre of Player One gave very high remarks to the visual presentation, sound design, playability, difficulty and longevity. Andreas Knauf of Video Games complemented the detailed graphics and playability, regarding the game to be better than Soccer Brawl. Paolo Cardillo of Computer+Videogiochi praised the visuals, audio, playability and longevity, stating that Super Sidekicks is "undoubtedly fun, but much more was expected from the Neo Geo". Likewise, Piemarco Rosa of Consolemania commended the visuals, sprite animations and arcade-perfect gameplay but criticized the sound design for being inappropriate.

Megablast's Michael Schnelle commended the visuals but felt mixed about other aspects. HobbyConsolas's Marcos García gave high remarks to the visuals, sound design and playability, but criticized the small team roster and the lack of certain gameplay aspects. Jean-François Morisse and Nourdine Nini of Joypad praised the graphics, animations, controls and sound design but criticized the slowdown that occurs when too many sprites are present in penalty areas. G. S. of Play Time criticized the sound but praised both visuals and gameplay. Electronic Gaming Monthly's four reviewers commented positively in regards to the visuals, sound design and gameplay. German magazine Mega Fun reviewed and praised the title several times, with both Uwe Kraft and Ulf Schneider commending the visuals and sound. Similarly, GameFan's four reviewers gave positive remarks to the visual department and fast gameplay.

Javier Iturrioz of Superjuegos commended the visual presentation, simple controls and gameplay, but noted that the gameplay options do not vary much. AllGame's Kyle Knight gave positive remarks to the visuals and gameplay but criticized the sound design and controls. He called the game as equally enjoyable and frustrating.

=== Retrospective reviews ===
Retrospective assessments

Aggregate score
Aggregator	Score
GameRankings	(NS) 45%

Review scores
Publication	Score
M! Games	(PSN) 6/10
Nintendo Life	(NS) 5/10
Nintendo World Report	(NS) 4/10
VentureBeat	(PSN) 77/100
Bonus Stage	(NS) 4/10

Super Sidekicks has been met with mixed reception from retrospective reviewers in recent years. VentureBeat's Daav Valentaten noted its colorful graphics, fast action, simple controls but criticized the inability to choose players, precision to steal the ball from opponents and framerate in the PlayStation Network version. In 2014, HobbyConsolas identified it as one of the twenty best games for the Neo Geo AES. Elliott Osange of Bonus Stage stated that "Super Sidekicks will appeal to fans from the NEO GEO era and diehard football fans who need something to fill the void in their lives. For casual sports players and non-sport entities, however, this is going to be a hard pass".

A staff member of German magazine MAN!AC reviewed the PlayStation Network version via PlayStation Portable, noting the difficulty level of AI-controlled opponents and praised the visual presentation, regarding the game to be quite entertaining but recommended playing its sequels.

Nintendo Life's Dave Frear praised its fast gameplay and visual presentation but criticized the lack of additional replay value, options and teams. Nintendo World Report's J.P. Cobran criticized the controls, the disjointed gameplay for being choppy and the zoomed perspective.

== Legacy ==
Super Sidekicks spawned a series of three sequels and a remake; Super Sidekicks 2: The World Championship (1994), Super Sidekicks 3: The Next Glory (1995), The Ultimate 11: SNK Football Championship (1996) and Neo Geo Cup '98: The Road to the Victory (1998). The Ultimate 11 proved to be less popular than its predecessors, while Neo Geo Cup '98 served as the final game in the series. Mexican magazine Club Nintendo regarded the Super Sidekicks franchise as one of the best soccer sagas in video games, touting it to be better than Sega's Virtua Striker series.
