= Nintendo Magazine System =

Nintendo Magazine System may refer to:

- Nintendo Magazine System (United Kingdom), a defunct British magazine, more recently known as Official Nintendo Magazine, launched in October 1992 and folded in January 2006
- Nintendo Magazine System (Australia), a defunct Australian magazine launched in April 1993 and folded in August 2000
