= TEG =

TEG may refer to:

- Triethylene glycol
- Thromboelastography
- TEG (board game), an Argentine Risk-based board game
- Twin Eagles Group, a Peruvian video game developer and scener group
- Tenés Empanadas Graciela, a computer game inspired by the above board game
- TEG Federal Credit Union, a New York bank
- Thermoelectric generator, a device that can convert heat into electricity
- Ticketek Entertainment Group, an Australian events ticketing company
- The Edrington Group, A Scotch Whisky and spirits manufacturer based in Scotland
- The Enhanced Games, a sporting event which allows athletes to use performance-enhancing substances
- Teg, Umeå, a section of the city of Umeå, in Sweden
- The Teg, a small stream in Berkshire, England
- Teastas Eorpach na Gaeilge, a set of examinations for adult learners of Irish
