= Tecmo World Cup Soccer =

1990 video game

- Developer: Tecmo
- Publisher: Tecmo
- Platform: Nintendo Entertainment System
- Release: JP: December 7, 1990; EU: 1991
- Genre: Sports
- Modes: Single-player, multiplayer

Tecmo World Cup Soccer is a sports video game released in 1990 by Tecmo for the Nintendo Entertainment System. It is a port of Tehkan World Cup, released in the arcades in 1985. As its name suggests, it is a soccer game focusing on the World Cup.

Although the two games appear virtually identical, Tecmo World Cup Soccer lacks some of the speed and fluidity of its arcade progenitor. While the gameplay is ostensibly unchanged, the lack of support for analog control in the NES version renders it a digital-control-only game that requires almost completely different tactics.

Tecmo World Cup Soccer is not to be confused with Nintendo World Cup (released the same year), nor Tecmo Cup Soccer Game (known as Captain Tsubasa in Japan).

== World Cup Teams ==
The national teams in Tecmo World Cup Soccer are as follows (in order, they are available to choose in game "Team Select" menu):

- Brazil
- West Germany
- Italy
- Netherlands
- Argentina
- Soviet Union
- Uruguay
- Poland
- England
- Spain
- Colombia
- Scotland
- France
- United States
- South Korea
- Japan

== Similarities to Tehkan World Cup ==
Tecmo World Cup Soccer, released five years after its arcade ancestor, is a mostly faithful conversion of Tehkan World Cup squeezed with some concessions into the smaller NES hardware. These are the main similarities between both games:

- The same musical score (albeit adapted to the NES sound hardware)
- Nearly identical gameplay (although significantly hampered by the absence of analog control)
- Almost identical graphics (partially simplified and slowed down)

== Differences to Tehkan World Cup ==
As Tehkan World Cup utilized two processors for gameplay and four processors for sound, certain concessions were made to playability on the NES. While the gameplay and graphics remained largely unaltered, certain features were omitted. In recognition of its new home system format, some arcade elements such as the instant knockout, were abandoned in order to provide greater longevity. A partial list of differences includes:

- A choice of teams is now available
- Competition format
- Game lengths
- On-screen "scoreboard" (includes large font game clock and score) omitted
- Field radar showing player positions omitted
- The "grass" had a simpler, more unified texture
- Players do not celebrate during the goal sequence
- The goal net is shown to bulge upon receipt of the ball
- Slide tackles can be initiated by the player
- The ball could bounce after a high kick
- The ball rebounds from the net and goalposts in a slightly different manner

== See also ==
- Tehkan World Cup
- Tecmo Cup Football Game
- Super Sidekicks
- Tecmo World Cup '90
- International Superstar Soccer
- Neo Geo Cup '98: The Road to the Victory
- Legendary Eleven
