= Bomba Patch =

Pro Evolution Soccer mod series

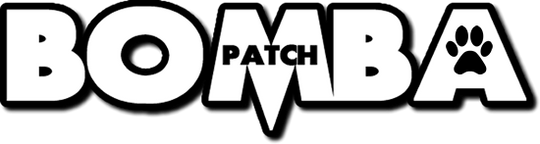
The Bomba Patch logo

Bomba Patch is a series of mods for the sports video game series Pro Evolution Soccer, created by Brazilian rental store owner Allan Jefferson. It originated in 2007 from a championship he organized at his store for the sixth title in the series. For it, Jefferson replaced the original, foreign soccer teams with Brazilian teams. The mod became popular nationwide. Jefferson stopped working on Bomba Patch in 2008, when he moved away to study at a university. However, when he later discovered the game's popularity, he resumed updates. Since then, several versions of the mod have been created, along with social media accounts. Sources recognize Bomba Patch as a reason for the survival of the PlayStation 2 in Brazil, as a "symbol of passion for sport and video games" in the country, and as "the most successful unofficial Brazilian game".

== Background and creation ==
Allan Jefferson, owner of a rental store in Mogi Mirim, had already worked on modifying International Superstar Soccer for the Super Nintendo Entertainment System in the 1990s, replacing the original teams with Brazilian ones. Later, he went on to update the first versions of Pro Evolution Soccer (PES; also known as Winning Eleven) for the PlayStation, changing the players' names from the Japanese language to the Portuguese language.

In 2007, with the growing popularity of Counter-Strike tournaments in LAN houses, Jefferson decided to "combat" them by holding championships for the PlayStation 2 game Pro Evolution Soccer 6, using the mod "Brazucas". Due to Brazucas' delay in publishing updates for the mod, Jefferson decided to make his own version. He initially replaced the foreign teams for Brazilian ones; for example, Barcelona would become São Paulo, and Real Madrid would become Corinthians. However, the team's uniforms and emblems were left unaltered, as these changes were made by Jefferson via the PES editing menu itself. He changed these items when he realized that he could use a computer for the editing. Jefferson then edited in clubs from the Campeonato Brasileiro Série A and Série B.

The first championship would have no prize. However, when the participants asked about it, Jefferson decided to give away chocolate éclairs (known as "bombas de chocolate" in Brazil), which were sold by his mother. As such, the championship was named "Copa Bomba". Jefferson reported that even in the second championship, with prizes such as Discmans and DVD players, the participants still preferred éclairs. Eventually, the mod, inspired by the name of the competition, was called "Bomba Patch" and was updated weekly and made available at his rental store.

Jefferson also allowed participants in the championship to take the mod home for training purposes. According to him, one of them took a copy of the mod to a store in the city in exchange for another game. One of the shopkeepers was in business with a large street market in another city. Because of that, it started appearing in other street vendors, who started reproducing the game en masse. It became increasingly popular and also appeared on download sites. At the time, Jefferson also created a group to teach other people how to edit and modify PES.

== Hiatus and return ==
Updates to the mod were discontinued in 2008, since Jefferson and his team went to university. Jefferson went to study Computer Science, spending a year "isolated from the gaming world" in the town of Mulungu, Paraíba. There, he lived on his family's farm, with little access to the Internet. Jefferson only realized how popular the mod was when he went to the center of a neighboring town, Guarabira, and found it in a local game store. The shopkeeper said that the mod was the best-selling game on the site, and recommended Jefferson to continue updating Bomba Patch, stating that he would pay for Jefferson's studies so that he could focus on Bomba Patch.

Jefferson was offered the opportunity to deliver Bomba Patch updates first-hand to the store, which would sponsor it. He accepted, but due to the lack of Internet where he lived, he moved to the center of Mulungu with his cousin, who was a town councilor, and talked to the Internet provider. The signal was only sent via radio waves, so the technician told him that a receiving antenna in a high place was needed, the suggestion being a church tower. Jefferson explained the installation process in an interview:

Two or three months earlier, lightning had struck the church. We went to install the antenna in hiding and a neighbor called the priest to tell him what was going on. She passed the phone to me and I told her we were installing a lightning rod. Instead of being scolded, the priest thanked us and said that he was going to put up a loudspeaker to tell people that the church was now 100% safe and that Mass could resume.

As a result, the mod was updated again, starting with version 4.6. The store gained in-game advertising. Jefferson decided to create a theme song for Bomba Patch, and remembered the song that the town priest had put on the sound system: "100% safe, you can come back now, let's pray to God, he'll bless us". The result was a funk song with the lyrics "100% up to date, it's hard to take, Bomba Patch has become fashionable, everyone wants to play". According to Globo Esporte, the theme song is "one of the most iconic songs of the Brazilian gamer scene", and called it the "Brazilian virtual soccer anthem". Without his original team, Jefferson continued to teach people how to edit PES, helping with the profusion of versions of the game signed by different teams and creating a community of Bomba Patch editors.

== Recent years ==
It's been 14 years of dedication to Bomba Patch. I always have a monitor on to check Twitter and soccer news. If Neymar changes his hair right now, I'll work on updating Bomba Patch right away.

— Allan Jefferson, October 29, 2021.

Bomba Patch began to decline in popularity with the launch of new generation consoles. Even so, Jefferson still publishes updates to the mod; while its main platform is still the PlayStation 2, there have also been versions for Xbox 360, PlayStation Portable, PlayStation 3, PlayStation 4, PlayStation Vita, PlayStation 5 and Android. Jefferson has also created social networks for the mod, with humor and updates on world soccer, including an official channel on YouTube, where some mods are made available for free.

Bomba Patch published several "updates" to the mod on its official Twitter account, based on real-world events. For example, an image was published showing Ronaldinho Gaúcho in prison clothes inside the mod, in reference to his arrest in 2020. Other updates included the addition of protective masks, in reference to the COVID-19 pandemic, the removal of clubs that would participate in the European Super League, and the removal of Russia following its invasion of Ukraine. In 2021, Jefferson declared that he was developing several original games for cell phones and consoles, and also announced that he was working on a version of Bomba Patch that was fully integrated with WhatsApp.

== Impact and legacy ==
Jefferson believes that Bomba Patch helped popularize Pro Evolution Soccer in Brazil. According to The Enemy, "In Brazil, it's practically impossible to tell the story of the PlayStation 2 without remembering Bomba Patch[, which] won over the country with its frequent updates, uniforms identical to those in real life and the classic theme song". He also claimed that "Bomba Patch can also be considered one of the main reasons for the PS2's survival in Brazil. Currently, the console is still the third most used in the country, and having a soccer game that remains 100% up-to-date is certainly a factor in this longevity." Globo Esporte stated: "Launched at a time when national soccer was not yet receiving so much attention from games, Bomba Patch has become a symbol of passion for sport and video games of part of the Brazilian population". According to Vice, "The mod [...] managed to bring together the passion for sport and games in the most Brazilian way possible", and claimed that "Due to the very issue of piracy, it is difficult to quantify the success of the patch in numbers, but it is not an unrealistic estimate to say that it is the most successful unofficial Brazilian game."

According to the Bomba Patch team, the 2022 version of the mod had been downloaded over a hundred thousand times by October 2021.
