= Super Sidekicks 2: The World Championship =

1994 video game

- Developer: SNK
- Publisher: SNK
- Producer: Eikichi Kawasaki
- Designer: Mina Kawai
- Programmer: T. Nakamura
- Artist: Ten Chan
- Composer: Yoshihiko Kitamura
- Series: Super Sidekicks
- Platforms: Arcade, Neo Geo AES, Neo Geo CD
- Release: JP: April 19, 1994; NA: April 1994
- Genre: Sports
- Modes: Single-player, multiplayer
- Arcade system: Neo Geo MVS

Super Sidekicks 2: The World Championship (Note: Also known as Tokuten Ou 2: Real Fight Football (Japanese: 得点王2: リアルファイトフットボール, Hepburn: Tokuten Ō 2: Riaru Faito Futtobōru; lit. "Goal-Scoring King 2: Real Fight Football") in Japan) is a 1994 association football video game developed and published by SNK for the Neo Geo arcade and home platforms. It is the second installment in the Super Sidekicks series and the third soccer game released for Neo Geo MVS, preceding the original Super Sidekicks (1992). Featuring an arcade-style approach to soccer as its predecessor, the game allows players to choose any of the available game modes with AI-controlled opponents or other human players with the team of their choosing. Its gameplay uses a simplified three-button configuration.

Headed by Eikichi Kawasaki, Super Sidekicks 2: The World Championship was developed by a staff that worked on several projects for the Neo Geo platforms at SNK. Hamster Corporation re-released the game as part of their ACA Neo Geo series for the PlayStation 4, Xbox One, Nintendo Switch and Windows; this version was removed from storefronts due to issues regarding the Republic of China.

The game proved popular among players and garnered critical acclaim from reviewers, with praise directed towards improvements made over its predecessor. It was followed by Super Sidekicks 3: The Next Glory in 1995.

== Gameplay ==
Gameplay screenshot showcasing a match between Spain and England.

As with its predecessor, Super Sidekicks 2: The World Championship is a soccer game that is played from a top-down perspective in a two-dimensional environment with sprites. Though it follows the same gameplay as with other soccer titles at the time and most of the sport's rules are present as well, the game opts for a more arcade-styled approach of the sport instead of being full simulation. The sequel corrected most of the design flaws in the first entry, including the ability to switch players' control during the game, a smaller goal, and no more long shots taken, among other new gameplay improvements and additions.

Upon starting the game, the player's team goes into a "Regional Qualifying Round Final" against another team from the same region. After beating it, the player's team goes into the World Cup Tournament, in which they are grouped with three other countries in a round-robin. After winning against all of them, the team enters an elimination tournament: the quarterfinals, semifinals, and the final for the World Cup, reminiscent of the real-life World Cup. If a match ends in a draw, the player has the option of replaying a full game, going to the penalty kick tiebreaker, or playing a sudden death (golden goal) game; however, the arcade version requires an extra credit for these.

=== Teams ===
There are 48 teams available to choose from before the start of any mode, each one divided into 6 geographical "regions" and representing their country:

Europe A

- Italy
- England
- Spain
- Netherlands
- Switzerland
- Norway
- Turkey
- Ireland

Europe B

- Germany
- France
- Bulgaria
- Sweden
- Russia
- Greece
- Belgium
- Romania

Americas/Oceania

- United States
- Mexico
- Canada
- Australia
- New Zealand
- Costa Rica
- El Salvador
- Honduras

Asia

- South Korea
- Japan
- Saudi Arabia
- Taiwan
- China
- Iran
- Hong Kong
- United Arab Emirates

South America

- Brazil
- Argentina
- Paraguay
- Colombia
- Bolivia
- Uruguay
- Peru
- Ecuador

Africa

- Cameroon
- Morocco
- Nigeria
- Egypt
- South Africa
- Ivory Coast
- Guinea
- Zambia

== Development and release ==
Super Sidekicks 2: The World Championship was the third soccer game developed for the Neo Geo MVS after the first Super Sidekicks, being created by staff who worked on projects for the Neo Geo platforms at SNK such as 3 Count Bout, with producer Eikichi Kawasaki heading its development and a member under the pseudonym "Yellow Beat" acted as main designer. T. Nakamura and members under pseudonyms "Uzumasa", "Ep82boy" and "YuritaN" worked as programmers. Mic Senbey, Mina Kawai, Ten Chan and other staff members were responsible for the pixel art. Shinsekai Gakkyoku Zatsugidan members Yoshihiko "Jojouha Kitapy" Kitamura, "Brother Hige" and "Akibon" handled the sound. Other members collaborated in its development. Super Sidekicks 2 was first released by SNK for the Neo Geo MVS on April 19, 1994 and later for Neo Geo AES in May. The game was later re-released for the Neo Geo CD in Japan in September 1994 and North America in October 1996.

== Reception ==
Reception

Aggregate score
Aggregator	Score
GameRankings	(NG) 80%

Review scores
Publication	Score
AllGame	(AC) 3.5/5 (NG) 3.5/5
Consoles +	(NG) 95%
Edge	(NG) 8/10
Electronic Gaming Monthly	(NG) 8/10
GamesMaster	(NG) 82%
HobbyConsolas	(NG) 94/100
Hobby Hi-Tech	(NGCD) 8/10
MAN!AC	(NG) 85%
Megablast	(NG) 85%
Mega Fun	(NG) 83%
Player One	(NG) 97%
Superjuegos	(AC) 89/100 (NG) 87/100
Video Games	(NG) 84%

Awards
Publication	Award
VideoGames (1994)	2nd Best Neo•Geo Game
EGM (1995)	The EGM Hot 50 (Neo Geo)

Super Sidekicks 2: The World Championship proved popular among players and received critical acclaim from gaming magazines, with most reviewers agreeing that the sequel was an improvement over the original Super Sidekicks. In Japan, Game Machine listed Super Sidekicks 2 on their June 1, 1994 issue as being the fifth most-popular arcade game at the time. In North America, RePlay reported it was the fourteenth most-popular arcade game at the time. Play Meter also listed the title to be the fifty-first most-popular arcade game at the time. Marc Menier and Richard Homsy of Consoles + unanimously praised the Neo Geo AES version for the overall improvements over its predecessor including visual presentation, sound design, replay value and gameplay, regarding it as one of the best soccer games on consoles. Andreas Knauf of MAN!AC regarded it to be a standout title from most soccer simulators, stating that the game was almost perfect from a technical and gameplay perspective. Likewise, Terry of Player One also gave unanimous praise to the title's visuals, sound and gameplay. Electronic Gaming Monthly's five reviewers applauded its control, intense action, sound effects, and overall arcade game quality.

HobbyConsolas's Manuel del Campo praised Super Sidekicks 2 for its Spanish translation, audiovisual presentation, playability and addictive gameplay. Megablast's Steffen Schamberger gave positive remarks to the overall improvements over its predecessor, regarding the gameplay as phenomenal but criticized the sound design. Uwe Kraft and Stephan Girlich of Mega Fun commended the visuals and sound work, but Girlich expressed that he expected more from the title regarding its gameplay. Wolfgang Schaedle of Video Games stated that SNK succeeded in making an "excellent" soccer simulator with Super Sidekicks 2, citing its controls as better than the original Super Sidekicks. Juan Carlos Sanz, José Luis del Carpio and Roberto Serrano of Spanish magazine Superjuegos gave the arcade original a very positive outlook, while Javier Iturrioz reviewed the AES version and praised the technical innovations introduced in the sequel over the first entry but criticized certain aspects.

A reviewer of Edge magazine regarded Super Sidekicks 2 as the best arcade-style soccer game on consoles, praising the improvements made over the first Super Sidekicks but criticized that the teams do not change end during halftimes and its high retail price. Electronic Gaming Monthly ranked Super Sidekicks 2 as one of their 50 highest-rated games of 1994. Spanish magazine Hobby Hi-Tech gave the Neo Geo CD version an 8 out of 10 score, praising the graphics and gameplay. Superjuegos's Iturrioz praised the ability to choose languages, improved presentation and expanded team roster but remarked that the gameplay was not as good as the first Super Sidekicks. AllGame's Kyle Knight commended the responsive controls and improved visual presentation, regarding it to be a "great leap over its predecessor" but criticized the sound design and lack of music during gameplay. However, Brad Cook of AllGame stated that the game was a basic sports title from the era.
