= Tecmo World Cup '90 =

1989 video game

- Japanese arcade flyer
- Developers: Tecmo; Hertz (MD)
- Publishers: Tecmo: JP: SIMS (MD); NA: Atlus (MD)
- Platforms: Arcade; Mega Drive
- Release: Arcade: JP: July 27, 1989; NA: September 1989; EU: December 1989; Mega Drive: JP: January 31, 1992; NA: 1992
- Genres: Sports (association football)
- Modes: Single-player, multiplayer

Tecmo World Cup '90 is an association football video game released by Tecmo as an arcade video game in 1989. It was a successor to Tecmo's Tehkan World Cup (1985) and is based on the 1990 FIFA World Cup.

An unofficial bootleg of the game named Euro League featuring European club teams was also released. An unfaithful home version was developed by Hertz and published by SIMS for the Mega Drive renamed simply Tecmo World Cup (in Japan, the game was called Tecmo World Cup '92), and ported to the Master System as Tecmo World Cup '93.

== Gameplay ==
The player can select one from eight available national teams in Tecmo World Cup '90. Japan were included despite them failing to qualify for the World Cup in 1990. The game was an unofficial release, giving them the chance to include the team to appease Japanese players.

The following teams are selectable:

- Japan
- United States
- England
- Argentina
- Brazil
- West Germany
- Soviet Union
- Italy

A European revision of the game was later released, which includes France (also non-qualifiers) in place of the US and Spain in place of Japan.

The Genesis version and Master System versions feature 24 national teams:

- Algeria
- Argentina
- Belgium
- Brazil
- China
- Denmark

- England
- France
- Germany
- Netherlands
- Hungary
- Italy

- Japan
- South Korea
- Mexico
- Morocco
- Peru
- Poland

- Scotland
- Spain
- Soviet Union (Russia in the American version and on Master System version)
- Uruguay
- United States
- Yugoslavia

Euro League features 8 club teams:

- (Spain) FC Barcelona
- (Spain) Atlético Madrid
- (Spain) Real Madrid C.F.
- (Italy) A.C. Milan
- (Kingdom of the Netherlands) PSV Eindhoven
- (Italy) Inter Milan
- (Italy) S.S.C. Napoli
- (Germany) FC Bayern Munich

Note that in this bootleg the official club names and logos are not used.

== Reception ==
In Japan, Game Machine listed Tecmo World Cup '90 on their November 1989 issue as being the second most-successful table arcade unit of the month. In the United Kingdom, it was one of the top four highest-grossing arcade games during early 1990, along with Teenage Mutant Ninja Turtles, Super Masters and Line of Fire.

World Cup '90 received positive reviews from critics upon release in arcades. Sean Kelly of Zero magazine called it a "fast and addictive" game. Computer + Video Games magazine gave it an 83% score, complimenting its graphics and gameplay.

== See also ==
- Super Sidekicks
- Tecmo World Cup Soccer
- International Superstar Soccer
- Neo Geo Cup '98: The Road to the Victory
- Legendary Eleven
