= Unholy Night: The Darkness Hunter =

2017 video game

- Developers: Foxbat Corporation; Nu-Gaia
- Publishers: JP: BlazePro; NA: Retroism; EU: JoshProd
- Producer: Tatsunori Mano
- Designers: Hiroto Namada; Wakama2
- Programmer: Take Spirit
- Artists: Sachie Okumoto; Takachan Onishi; Yoshi
- Composer: Maz
- Platform: Super Nintendo Entertainment System
- Release: JP: April 8, 2017; NA: June 19, 2017; EU: July 10, 2017
- Genre: Fighting
- Modes: Single-player, multiplayer

Unholy Night: The Darkness Hunter (Note: Also known as Makai Hunter: The Darkness Hunter -Unholy Night- (Japanese: 魔界狩人: ザ・ダークネス・ハンター -アンホーリー・ナイト-, Hepburn: Makai Kariudo: Za Dākunesu Hantā -Anhōrī Naito-) in Japan.) is a 2017 fighting game developed by Foxbat Corporation with assistance from Nu-Gaia and published exclusively for the Super Nintendo Entertainment System in Japan by BlazePro, North America by Retroism and Europe by JoshProd. Set during modern times, the game follows six fighters from three groups as they face-off in a conflict to confront the vampire Katatonia. Its gameplay consists of one-on-one fights, with a main three-button configuration, featuring special moves and four playable modes.

Headed by Foxbat CEO Tatsunori Mano, Unholy Night: The Darkness Hunter was created by former SNK members who worked on several fighting game franchises, being first launched through Kickstarter but failed to meet its crowdfunding goal before Retroism acquired the publishing rights for release. The title was met with mixed reception from players and critics since its release, many of which felt divided in regards to several design aspects.

== Gameplay ==
Gameplay screenshot showcasing a match with Nightmare and Reinhardt.

Unholy Night: The Darkness Hunter is a fighting game similar to Street Fighter II. The player fights against other opponents in one-on-one matches and the fighter who manages to deplete the health bar of the opponent wins the first bout. The first to win two bouts becomes the winner of the match. Each round is timed, which can be adjusted or deactivated in the game options; if both fighters still have health remaining when time expires, the fighter with more health wins the round. Basic attacks include a light, medium, and heavy strike.

In story mode, the player can choose from six playable characters and fight against computer-controlled fighters. A hidden character can be selected by fulfilling certain conditions. If all of the opponents are defeated, the player will be able to fight against a final boss. Like Street Fighter II, performing various motions on the direction pad along with button presses will execute special attacks that are unique to each character; The "Synchro Gauge" acts as a super meter that (when full) can be used to unleash a "Super Special Attack" (a more devastating special attack). Other game modes include a local two-player versus mode, survival and training.

== Synopsis ==
=== Plot ===
As the fear and enemy of humankind since ancient times, the "Darkness" clan disappeared from the rise of civilization but did not perish and remained alive hunting but those willing to fight back are known as "Hunters". One day, a rumor was heard for those who lived in the darkness about a coffin that sealed the strongest vampire from the Middle Ages, Katatonia, had been moved from its entombment and placed in the "Dragon Palace". The sea that gathers the "Dragon Aura" in the palace weakens and will eventually break. Katatonia will awake with his power greater than before. The Darkness clan wants the power for Katatonia while the Hunters try to contain him.

=== Characters ===
The playable cast is broken into six playable characters with one unplayable boss, three "Hunters" and three "Darkness":

- Hunters
  - Blaze: A "Danpiel" since birth, possessing human and vampire abilities.
  - Reinhardt: A top hunter of the "Saint Knights", who mercilessly punish those who disobey the knight order.
  - Emily: A proud hunter who enters an old house as maid to find out members of the darkness clan to kill them.
- Darkness Clan
  - Cronos: A vampire revived in present times and rival of Blaze.
  - Wurzel: A werewolf warrior of the "Wolfe" clan, who continues to fight humans since ancient times.
  - Nightmare: A "Dream Evil" born in modern society and devours human desires.
  - Katatonia: Final boss of the game. A vampire feared for his strength before being sealed by the Saint Knights.

== Development and release ==
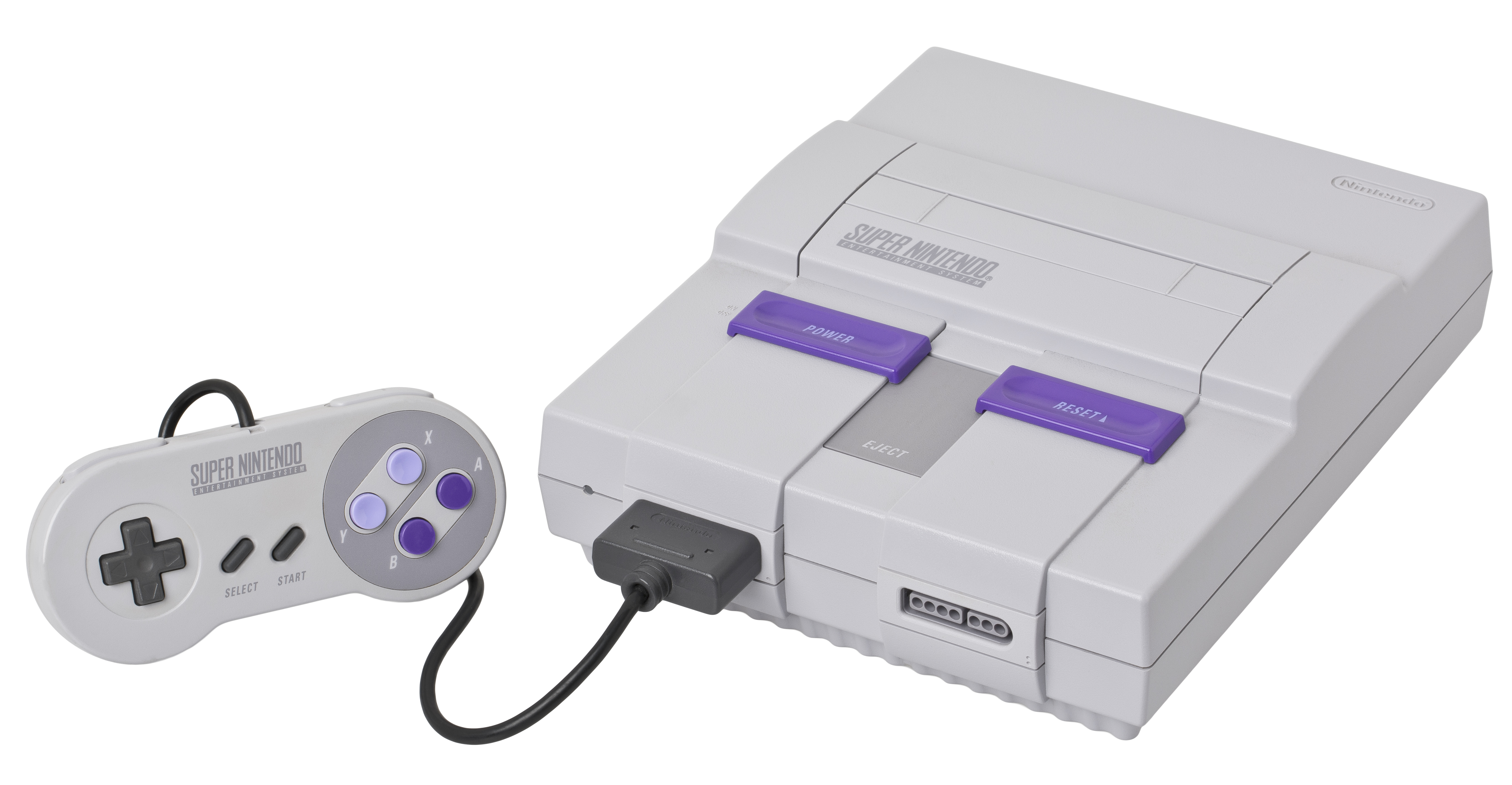
Unholy Night: The Darkness Hunter for the SNES was developed by former SNK members, being the first fighting game for the console in 21 years.

Unholy Night: The Darkness Hunter was co-developed by Nu-Gaia and Foxbat Corporation, a Japanese developer composed of ex-SNK staff previously involved with series such as Art of Fighting, Super Sidekicks, Samurai Shodown, The King of Fighters and The Last Blade. Foxbat CEO Tatsunori Mano acted as producer. Hiroto Namada and "Wakama2" served as co-designers. Former Brezzasoft programmer "Take Spirit" was responsible for coding. Artists Sachie Okumoto, Takachan ".024" Onishi and "Yoshi" drew the characters and stages respectively. The sound design was handled by composer "Maz". Other members also collaborated in its development.

Unholy Night: The Darkness Hunter was first unveiled to the public in a playable state at the 2016 Hong Kong Retro Game Expo. The game was launched by BlazePro on Kickstarter in 2017 but proved unsuccessfully in reaching its funding goal of US$52,500, raising only half of its needed funds during the campaign. However, publisher Retroism later picked up distribution rights to release the title. It received coverage from outlets like Siliconera, The Verge and USgamer for being a new release on the Super NES, becoming the first fighting title on the platform in 21 years after Street Fighter Alpha 2. It was first published in Japan by BlazePro on 8 April 2017, then in North America by Retroism on 19 June 2017 and later in Europe by JoshProd on 10 July 2017. The cover art was illustrated by Hong Kong artist "Saigenton".

== Reception ==
Unholy Night: The Darkness Hunter was met with mixed reception from players and critics. Argentinian magazine Replay praised its anime-style aesthetic and character designs. Bloody Disgusting's Mike Wilson stated it was a "cool thing" seeing developers creating new games for old hardware but remarked that the title was not on par with fighting franchises such as Guilty Gear and The King of Fighters. Anime News Network's Dustin Bailey regarded it to be a "ragged mess", criticizing its controls, limited character roster and audiovisual presentation. Writing for his website The Video Game Critic, David Mrozek commended its digitized-esque graphics, simple controls and "Synchro Gauge" mechanic but criticized its poor English translation and unsophisticated fighting system, among other aspects. Both USgamer's Mike Williams and Alan Ricardo de Oliveira of Brazilian publication WarpZone drew comparison with Darkstalkers due to its visual style.
