= The Ultimate 11: SNK Football Championship =

1996 video game

- Arcade flyer
- Developer: SNK
- Publisher: SNK
- Producer: Takashi Nishiyama
- Designers: I.Etsuko; Y.Romario
- Composer: Yasuo Yamate
- Series: Super Sidekicks
- Platforms: Arcade, Neo Geo AES
- Release: JP: October 16, 1996; NA: November 1996
- Genre: Sports
- Modes: Single-player, multiplayer
- Arcade system: Neo Geo MVS

The Ultimate 11: SNK Football Championship (Note: Also known as Tokuten Ou: Honoo no Libero (Japanese: 得点王: 炎のリベロ, Hepburn: Tokuten Ō: Honō no Libero; lit. "Goal-Scoring King: The Flaming Sweeper") in Japan) is a 1996 association football video game developed and published by SNK for the Neo Geo arcade and home platforms. Despite the international name, it is the fourth installment in the Super Sidekicks series, succeeding Super Sidekicks 3: The Next Glory (1995). Featuring an arcade-style approach to soccer much like its predecessors, the game allows players to choose any available game mode to compete with AI-controlled rivals or human players with their preferred team. It was re-released on download services for various consoles. The title received positive reception from critics but proved to be less popular than its previous iterations. It was followed by Neo Geo Cup '98: The Road to the Victory (1998), which is a remake of Super Sidekicks 3 and served as the final entry in the Super Sidekicks saga.

== Gameplay ==
Gameplay screenshot showcasing a match between Italy and Portugal

Similar to its predecessor, The Ultimate 11: SNK Football Championship is a soccer game that is played from a top-down perspective in a two-dimensional environment with sprites. Though it follows the same gameplay as with other soccer titles at the time and most of the sport's rules are present, the game opts for a more arcade-styled approach of the sport instead of being full simulation.

The players scoring the goals are still named, but individual scores are no longer kept. The regional tournaments have been eliminated and replaced with alternate mode the SNK Football Championship, which is the game's namesake, an elimination tournament in which the player can select any one opponent from any region to play. The last region played is the deciding match.

Good player performance opens up a match against a hidden boss team called the SNK Superstars, which features characters from SNK's fighting games as players. Teams now have a charge bar (similar to the one in fighting games), which is charged depending on how long the player keeps the ball under their team's control. When the bar is fully charged and flashing, if a player is near the goal, they can take a shot that is virtually unblockable, depending on the opposing team. Teams are ranked to mirror their real-life counterparts.

=== Team ===
There are 80 teams available to choose from before the start of any game modes, each one divided into 8 geographical "regions" and representing their country:

Europe (group A) * Italy * Spain * Portugal * Wales * France * England * Ireland * Scotland * Northern Ireland * Iceland	Europe (group B) * Germany * Sweden * Belgium * Denmark * Austria * Netherlands * Switzerland * Norway * Finland * Croatia	Europe (group C) * Bulgaria * Russia * Turkey * Czech Republic * Romania * Greece * Hungary * Poland * Slovakia * Israel	Africa * Nigeria * Cameroon * Zambia * Ivory Coast * South Africa * Egypt * Morocco * Zimbabwe * Tunisia * Algeria
Americas/Caribbean Sea * United States * Canada * El Salvador * Panama * Guatemala * Mexico * Puerto Rico * Costa Rica * Jamaica * Honduras	South America * Brazil * Colombia * Bolivia * Paraguay * Chile * Argentina * Uruguay * Ecuador * Peru * Venezuela	Asia/Oceania A * Saudi Arabia * India * Iraq * United Arab Emirates * Iran * Qatar * Oman * Bahrain * Kuwait * Uzbekistan	Asia/Oceania B * Australia * China * Taiwan * Thailand * New Zealand * South Korea * Japan * Malaysia * Hong Kong * Singapore

== Development and release ==
The Ultimate 11: SNK Football Championship was headed by Takashi Nishiyama. I.Etsuko and Y.Romario served as co-designers. Shinsekai Gakkyoku Zatsugidan members Yasuo "Tate-Norio" Yamate and MIKI handled both music and sound effects. The Ultimate 11 was first released by SNK for the Neo Geo MVS in Japan on October 16, 1996, and North America in November, and later for Neo Geo AES in December. The game was one of the few Neo Geo releases to feature a corporate sponsor Akai. Both the Japanese and European AES releases have since become one of the more expensive titles on the platform, with copies of the port fetching over US$6,000 and $45,000 on the secondary video game collecting market respectively. After its launch, the title was showcased to attendees at the 1996 AM Show. D4 Enterprise re-released it on the Wii's Virtual Console in March 2013. Hamster Corporation re-released the game as part of their ACA Neo Geo series for the PlayStation 4, Xbox One, Nintendo Switch; this version was removed due to issues regarding the Republic of China.

== Reception ==
Reception

Review scores
Publication	Score
AllGame	(NG) 4/5
Super Game Power	(NG) 3.8/5.0

The Ultimate 11: SNK Football Championship received positive reception from critics but proved to be less popular than its predecessors. A reviewer of Brazilian magazine Super Game Power praised the fun factor, controls, graphics and sound. AllGame's Kyle Knight commended the improved visual presentation and fine-tuned gameplay but criticized the sound design and difficulty level of AI-controlled opponents.
