= Konami Hyper Soccer =

1992 video game

- Developer: Konami
- Publisher: PAL: Konami
- Series: Hyper Sports
- Platform: Nintendo Entertainment System
- Release: EU: 1992; AU: 1992
- Genre: Sports
- Modes: Single-player, multiplayer

Konami Hyper Soccer is a 1992 soccer video game developed and published by Konami in Europe and Australia for the Nintendo Entertainment System. Part of the Hyper Sports series, which included Hyper Olympic (Track & Field outside Japan), its sequel Hyper Sports and Hyper Athlete (International Track & Field outside Japan), it is the second soccer game by Konami following Konami's Soccer (Konami's Football outside Japan) on the MSX, and their first soccer game on a Nintendo platform.

Konami Hyper Soccer received mixed reception from critics at release; reviewers noted the lack of on-screen display of the game's score or time remaining during gameplay, and felt divided regarding aspects such as the audiovisual presentation and playability, while criticism was geared at its technical shortcomings but the controls, range of available options and addition of a two-player mode were commended. Some named it one of the best soccer titles on the Nintendo Entertainment System. Retrospective commentary has been more positive, and is considered to be the predecessor to Konami's International Superstar Soccer and Pro Evolution Soccer franchises.

== Gameplay ==
Gameplay screenshot showcasing a match between Germany and Italy

As the controller of a NES game console has only two buttons, the gameplay is understandably simple, on the ball, one button for pass and slide tackle, that can be also used for volley, and one for lob and for headers while off the ball.

The game allows two players, either against each other or both against the computer in either a single match or a tournament. There are twenty-four playable international teams, Germany, the Netherlands, Italy, Argentina, France, Spain, England, Brazil, Poland, Uruguay, Hungary, USSR (now defunct), Sweden, Czechoslovakia (now defunct), Cameroon, Ireland, Japan, Korea (corresponds to South Korea rather than North Korea), United States, Mexico, Australia, Scotland, Colombia Belgium, Portugal, and Yugoslavia (now defunct). Before the game, the player can choose the formation of their team as well as number of overall attributes, including offense and defense, as well as luck. Unlike other similar games at the time, Hyper Soccer featured more advanced moves such as bicycle kicks, flying headers and volleys. The game features a scrolling view of the pitch and 2-dimensional sprites for the players, one of two background music tracks can be chosen to play during the match.

Unusual for a sports game, there is no on-screen display of the game's score or the time remaining.

== Release ==
Konami Hyper Soccer was only released in Europe and Australia, being Konami's first soccer game on a Nintendo platform. It was also planned for release in North America, but was cancelled for unknown reasons.

== Reception ==
Reception

Review scores
Publication	Score
Consoles +	76%
Joypad	79%
Joystick	82%
Player One	81%
Superjuegos	60/100
Video Games (DE)	58%
Banzzaï	63%
Mean Machines	66%
Nintendo Magazine System	66/100
Play Time	43%
Super Power	85/100

Konami Hyper Soccer garnered mixed reception from critics at release. Video Games' Martin Gaksch found Hyper Soccer to be an above-average sports game, criticizing its audiovisual department and aspects such as player-controlled teammates not being highlighted, as well as the inability to adjust play time, stating that "halfway demanding footballers will not be happy with it". In a similar tone as Gaksch, Play Time's Oliver Manne found the game's penalty shootout sequences to be its only exciting part and felt mixed regarding the audio, but criticized its slow-pacing and certain aspects of the visual presentation like the "unclean" screen scrolling, sprite flickering and limited animations, writing that "after just a few minutes of play, Hyper Soccer developed into a true tragedy". In contrast to the German publications, Consoles Plus' Robert Barbe was more positive towards the title, commending its graphics, realistic animations, rhythmic music, simple but responsive controls, and longevity.

Joystick's Jean-François Morisse and Joypad's Alain Huyghues-Lacour regarded it as one of the better football games on the Nintendo Entertainment System when compared to previous releases on the platform like Soccer, Goal! and Kick Off. Both Morisse and Huyghues-Lacour gave positive remarks to the visuals, sprite animations, sound and controls. Player One's Christophe Delpierre concurred with Morisse and Lacour, regarding it as one of the best football games on NES, and noting that its playability was "exemplary". Superjuegos' Carlos Yuste criticized Hyper Soccer for its "monotonous" graphics, due to lack of audience on the field and score marker, as well as not respecting the original colors of each team, in addition to the repetitive music. However, Yuste found its difficulty fair, and noted that the character movements were "very acceptable" for an 8-bit console.

Banzzaï's Lionel Vilner commended its audiovisual presentation but criticized the players' animations for being "bizarre". Nevertheless, Vilner ultimately found Hyper Soccer to be fun, but noted the lack of on-screen display of score and time during gameplay. Super Power's Frederic Bailly regarded it as the best football simulator for the NES, giving positive remarks to the game's clean visuals, realistic sprite animations, and responsive controls. Regardless, Bailly criticized the audio department for its unoriginal music and "practically inexistent" sound effects, as well as the constant slowdown. Mean Machines' Rob Bright and Julian Rignall found the title to be disappointing, criticizing its mediocre animations and visuals, grating music, "useless" sound effects, poor playability and frustrating AI. However, both Bright and Rignall praised its presentation due to the range of available options. Similarly, Robert Whitfield of the Australian Nintendo Magazine System called it a "poor soccer sim that lacks everything that makes the actual game great". Whitfield commended its presentation and addition of a two-player mode, but found the basic gameplay unimpressive and criticized the graphics due to the sprite flickering and "jerky" movement, slow sound and playability.

Retrospective commentary for Hyper Soccer has been more positive due to its fast and frantic arcade-style gameplay, and is considered to be the predecessor to Konami's International Superstar Soccer and Pro Evolution Soccer series. Writing for UOL Start, Rodrigo Lara of GameHall found the game's visuals to be very detailed for the NES and noted refinements such as the ball's size increasing when kicked into the air.
