= Super Sidekicks 3: The Next Glory =

1995 video game

- Developer: SNK
- Publisher: SNK
- Director: H. Kawano
- Producer: Eikichi Kawasaki
- Designers: Kanitaro; Performaru
- Programmer: Uzumasa Seven
- Composers: Akihiro Uchida; Pearl Shibakichi
- Series: Super Sidekicks
- Platforms: Arcade, Neo Geo AES, Neo Geo CD
- Release: JP: March 6, 1995; NA: April 1995
- Genre: Sports
- Modes: Single-player, multiplayer
- Arcade system: Neo Geo MVS

Super Sidekicks 3: The Next Glory (Note: Also known as Tokuten Ou 3: Challenge to Glory (Japanese: 得点王3: 栄光への挑戦, Hepburn: Tokuten Ō 3: Eikō e no Chōsen; lit. "Goal-Scoring King 3: Challenge to Glory") in Japan) is a 1995 association football video game developed and published by SNK for the Neo Geo arcade and home platforms. It is the third installment in the Super Sidekicks series, succeeding Super Sidekicks 2: The World Championship (1994). Featuring an arcade-style approach to soccer like its predecessors, the game allows players to choose any of the available game modes to compete with AI-controlled rivals or other human players with their preferred team. It was re-released through compilations and download services for various consoles. It proved popular among players and garnered positive reception from critics, but most reviewers noted that it felt more an update than a true successor to Super Sidekicks 2. It was followed by The Ultimate 11: SNK Football Championship in 1996.

== Gameplay ==
Gameplay screenshot showcasing a match between Italy and Holland

Like its predecessor, Super Sidekicks 3: The Next Glory is a soccer game that is played from a top-down perspective in a two-dimensional environment with sprites. Though it follows the same gameplay as with other soccer titles at the time and most of the sport's rules are present, the game opts for a more arcade-styled approach of the sport instead of being full simulation. New features in this game include naming the player scoring goals for his team and keeping score of how many goals he scores during his team's use by the player. Alongside the "Top Teams" ranking which serves as a high score table for teams, there is a "Top Scorer" table for individual players. The name and use of scoring players is random.

The second new feature include regional tournaments, in which a team (from any region) can enter a tournament within its own region or other regions. This is good for those players who like a particular team but don't want to be facing the same opponents every time, as they would if they played the World tournament. Championships include World Tournament (based on the real-life FIFA World Cup), Europe Tournament (UEFA European Football Championship), South America Tournament (Copa América), Americas Tournament (CONCACAF Gold Cup), Africa Tournament (African Cup of Nations), and Asia Tournament (AFC Asian Cup).

=== Teams ===
There are 64 teams available to choose from before the start of any mode, each one divided into 8 geographical "regions" and representing their country:

Europe (group A) * Italy * Netherlands * Switzerland * Norway * England * Turkey * Portugal * Poland	Europe (group B) * Germany * Spain * Ireland * Belgium * Romania * Denmark * Wales * Czech Republic	Europe (group C) * France * Sweden * Bulgaria * Russia * Greece * Austria * Hungary * Finland	Africa * Nigeria * Morocco * Cameroon * Egypt * South Africa * Zambia * Ivory Coast * Guinea
North America * United States * Canada * Guatemala * Mexico * Costa Rica * El Salvador * Puerto Rico * Panama	South America * Brazil * Colombia * Argentina * Bolivia * Uruguay * Ecuador * Peru * Chile	Asia (group A) * Australia * New Zealand * China * Taiwan * Iran * Vietnam * Iraq * Singapore	Asia (Group B) * Saudi Arabia * South Korea * Japan * United Arab Emirates * Hong Kong * India * Thailand * Malaysia

== Development and release ==
Super Sidekicks 3: The Next Glory was co-headed by director H. Kawano and producer Eikichi Kawasaki, who was involved in the two previous Super Sidekicks entries. A member under the pseudonym "Uzumasa Seven" worked as main programmer, with "Kanimaro" and "Perfomaru" acting as designers. Shinsekai Gakkyoku Zatsugidan members Akihiro "Ackey" Uchida and Pearl Shibakichi handled the sound design. Other members collaborated in its development. Super Sidekicks 3 was first released by SNK for the Neo Geo MVS in Japan on March 6, 1995, and North America in April, and later for Neo Geo AES on April 7. It was also showcased by SNK during the 1995 ACME show. The game was later re-released for the Neo Geo CD in Japan on June 23, 1995 and North America in October 1996. In 2008, it was included as part of SNK Arcade Classics Vol. 1 for Wii, PlayStation 2 and PlayStation Portable. In 2013, it was also included as part of the Volume 2 game card for Neo Geo X. Hamster Corporation re-released the game as part of their ACA Neo Geo series for the PlayStation 4, Xbox One, Nintendo Switch and Windows; this version was removed from storefronts due to issues regarding the Republic of China.

=== Remake ===
In 1998, a remake titled Neo Geo Cup '98: The Road to the Victory was developed and released by SNK for Neo Geo MVS to coincide with the FIFA World Cup 1998, serving as the final entry in the Super Sidekicks series due to the failure of the fourth entry. A Neo Geo Pocket Color was released under the name Neo Geo Cup '98 Plus Color.

== Reception ==
Reception

Aggregate score
Aggregator	Score
GameRankings	(NG) 82.50%

Review scores
Publication	Score
AllGame	(NG) 2/5
Edge	(NGCD) 6/10
Electronic Gaming Monthly	(NG) 8/10
GamePro	(NG) 18/20
Next Generation	(NG) 2/5
The Electric Playground	(NGCD) 8.5/10
HobbyConsolas	(NG) 92/100
Hobby Hi-Tech	(NGCD) 7/10
MAN!AC	(NG) 85%
Maximum	(NGCD) 2/5
Mega Fun	(NG) 77%
Micromanía	(NGCD) 88/100
Neo Geo Freak	(AC) 8/20
Play Time	(NG) 77%
Player One	(NG/NGCD) 90%
Superjuegos	(NGCD) 93/100
Última Generación	(NGCD) 66/100
Video Games	(NGCD) 79%

Super Sidekicks 3: The Next Glory proved popular among players and received positive reception from critics, but most reviewers felt that the game was a mere update rather than a true sequel to Super Sidekicks 2, with some regarding it as inferior to the previous release. In Japan, Game Machine listed Super Sidekicks 3 on their April 15, 1995 issue as being the tenth most-popular arcade game at the time. In North America, RePlay reported it was the ninth most-popular arcade game at the time. Electronic Gaming Monthly's two sports reviewers praised the Neo Geo AES version for its graphics, sound, and particularly the easy playability. Andreas Knauf of MAN!AC commended the visual and sound designs, stating that the title was an updated version of "an excellent soccer game". Stefan Hellert of Mega Fun similarly commended the graphics and sound but felt that the title was almost the same as the second Super Sidekicks. Likewise, Ralph Karels of Video Games remarked that the designers took the second Super Sidekicks entry and implemented minimal improvements in various gameplay areas.

Stephan Girlich of Play Time gave positive remarks to the audiovisual presentation, but stated that Super Sidekicks 3 would prove uninteresting for players of previous Super Sidekicks titles but accessible for newcomers. Christophe Delpierre of Player One commented positively about the graphics, animations, sound and playability. GamePro's Scary Larry called it "a fun, fast-paced game that will appeal to fans and nonfans alike". Larry particularly praised the graphics and the "quick and intuitive" control interface. Micromanía's F.D.L. reviewed the Neo Geo CD version criticized the long loading times but praised the addictive gameplay with multiple options and presentation. Next Generation reviewed the Neo-Geo version of the game, and gave two stars out of five. Although they were positive to graphics and some additions, such as the "chance" window, they felt that the gameplay lacks an excitement and called the title "average". Javier Iturrioz of Superjuegos praised the presentation, sound effects and responsive controls but remarked the music to be the most neglected aspect, stating that the game preserved elements from the Super Sidekicks 2 while improving the base gameplay.

HobbyConsolas's Sonia Herranz praised the graphics, music, sound effects, playability and addictive gameplay. Hobby Hi-Tech's Manuel del Campo noted that Super Sidekicks 3 did not introduce many additions compared to the second entry. The Electric Playground's Victor Lucas reviewed the Neo Geo CD version and gave positive remarks in regards to controls, visuals and sound design. Maximum gave the Neo Geo CD version two out of five stars, saying it suffers from "wooden" gameplay and inaccurate ball physics. Última Generación's J. Luis Sanz criticized the long loading times of the Neo Geo CD port. AllGame's Kyle Knight felt that Super Sidekicks 3: The Next Glory felt like Super Sidekicks 2 gameplay-wise while altering certain aspects negatively.
