= International Superstar Soccer 2000 =

1999 video game

- Developer: KCEO
- Publisher: Konami
- Series: International Superstar Soccer
- Platforms: Nintendo 64, Game Boy Color
- Release: July 29, 1999: Nintendo 64; JP: July 29, 1999; NA: August 3, 2000; PAL: October 6, 2000 Game Boy Color; JP: July 6, 2000; PAL: September 15, 2000; NA: December 2000
- Genre: Sports (soccer)
- Modes: Single-player, multiplayer

International Superstar Soccer 2000 (officially abbreviated as ISS 2000 and released in Japan as Jikkyou J-League 1999: Perfect Striker 2 for the Nintendo 64 and as World Soccer GB 2000 for the Game Boy Color in Japan) is the second game in the Nintendo 64 Perfect Striker series and the last in Konami's International Superstar Soccer series of N64 games developed by Konami Computer Entertainment Osaka. For the North American and European release in 2000 the rosters were updated. Introduced in the North American and European versions, it was the first and only game in the series to support the high resolution mode through an expansion pack; however, it suffered from some performance issues, affecting the frame rate of the game.

ISS 2000 is also notable for being the only game in the series which included players with real names, though these players only appeared in the North American release, and no team had a 100% real roster. International Superstar Soccer 2000 features one of the most comprehensive national team rosters in football video games, with exactly 100 teams in total. Particularly, every nation affiliated to UEFA at the time is present, since one of the game modes consists of a European Championship on the same format as the UEFA Euro (which had an edition that year), including the qualifying round. The Japanese version features J.League teams instead of international teams. It also includes different crowd chants for each team, a feature that was removed from the western releases.

== Teams ==
- England
- Scotland
- Wales
- Northern Ireland
- Republic of Ireland
- Iceland
- Germany
- Italy
- France
- Spain
- Netherlands
- Switzerland
- Austria
- Denmark
- Belgium
- Portugal
- Luxembourg
- San Marino
- Andorra
- Liechtenstein
- Yugoslavia
- Croatia
- Romania
- Bulgaria
- Greece
- Poland
- Czech Republic
- Slovakia
- Hungary
- Slovenia
- Bosnia and Herzegovina
- Albania
- Macedonia
- Sweden
- Norway
- Finland
- Faroe Islands
- Russia
- Estonia
- Latvia
- Lithuania
- Belarus
- Ukraine
- Moldova
- Georgia
- Armenia
- Azerbaijan
- Malta
- Cyprus
- Turkey
- Israel
- Cameroon
- Nigeria
- South Africa
- Tunisia
- Morocco
- Egypt
- Liberia
- Algeria
- Mali
- Ghana
- United States
- Canada
- Mexico
- Jamaica
- Cuba
- Honduras
- Costa Rica
- Trinidad and Tobago
- Brazil
- Argentina
- Colombia
- Uruguay
- Paraguay
- Bolivia
- Chile
- Peru
- Ecuador
- Venezuela
- Japan
- South Korea
- North Korea
- China
- Hong Kong
- Thailand
- Malaysia
- Saudi Arabia
- United Arab Emirates
- Iran
- Uzbekistan
- Kazakhstan
- Nepal
- India
- Iraq
- Kuwait
- Qatar
- Australia
- New Zealand
- Fiji
- Papua New Guinea

== Reception ==
On release, Famitsu magazine scored the Nintendo 64 version of the game a 34 out of 40. Nintendo Power gave the game seven out of ten.

Time Extension included the game on their "Best Nintendo 64 Games of All Time" list.
