= International Superstar Soccer (video game) =

1994 video game

- North American box art
- Developer: Konami
- Publisher: Konami Computer Entertainment Osaka
- Director: Yasuo Okuda
- Programmers: Yasuo Okuda; Eiji Nakagawa
- Composers: Harumi Ueko; Hideyuki Eto
- Series: International Superstar Soccer
- Platform: Super Nintendo Entertainment System
- Release: JP: November 11, 1994; EU: May 23, 1995; NA: June 1995
- Genre: Football (Sports)
- Modes: Single-player; Multiplayer

International Superstar Soccer (Note: Known as Jikkyō World Soccer Perfect Eleven (実況ワールドサッカーパーフェクトイレブン, Jikkyō Wārudo Sakkā Pāfekuto Irebun; "Live World Soccer Perfect Eleven") in Japan) is a 1994 football video game developed and published Konami for the Super Nintendo Entertainment System. It is the first title in the International Superstar Soccer (ISS) series of sports video games. It was initially released in Japan for the Super Famicom in 1994, and also in North America and Europe for the SNES in 1995. The game sold over 500,000 copies since its first week of release.

== Content ==
=== Game modes ===
- Open Game: A simple friendly match, that can be played against the CPU, another player, or just watched as the CPU controls both teams.
- International Cup: A mode that emulates the FIFA World Cup, (which had qualifying round. where teams are distributed in six groups of four that year), teams each. The best 16 in this stage qualify to the knockout stage until the champion is known.
- World Series: A league competition where all teams play against each other in a round-robin system.
- Training: A series of challenges in different respects (dribbling, passing, shooting to the goal, defending and corner kick taking, in order), where the player must complete these challenges successfully under the established time, with the goal to sharpening the player's abilities.
- Scenario: Enables the player to select one among nine matches running their courses, in order to achieve victory before time runs out (all matches start during the second half, and the player's team may be losing or tied). A draw results in failure.
- Penalty Kick: A simple penalty kick match. Each team takes five shots alternately and, if there is no winner after these shots, they go into a sudden death round.

The game uses a password system in order to save and load International Cup and World Series Euro Cup matches.

== Reception ==
Reception

Review scores
Publication	Score
Computer and Video Games	96/100
Electronic Gaming Monthly	7/10, 7/10
Famitsu	29/40
Game Informer	8.25/10
Game Players	79%
GamesMaster	89%
Hyper	90/100
Next Generation	3/5
Official Nintendo Magazine	96/100
Super Play	92%
Total!	(UK) 88/100 (DE) 2
Games World	90/100
Super Gamer	95/100
Ultimate Future Games	83%
VideoGames	8/10

According to Famitsu, International Superstar Soccer sold 96,608 copies in its first week on the market and 207,467 copies during its lifetime in Japan. The game received generally favorable reception from critics. GamePro said it was "a runner-up to" FIFA International Soccer (1993) "among the best soccer games." The reviewer commented that, though it fails to dethrone FIFA International Soccer as the best soccer simulator for the SNES because of its less precise controls and weaker sounds, International Superstar Soccer is a solid game due to its detailed and "lifelike" graphics, numerous options, and particularly its training mode. The two sports reviewers of Electronic Gaming Monthly both gave it a 7 out of 10 rating. Similar to GamePro, they remarked that the controls are imperfect but praised the graphics and play options. One of the reviewers complained that the enjoyable play-by-play feature of the Japanese version was taken out of the North American release. Next Generation reviewed the SNES version of the game, rating it three stars out of five, and stated that "the simple controls and plethora of season options outweigh the minor annoyances."

IGN ranked International Superstar Soccer 64th on their "Top 100 SNES Games of All Time." They praised the game calling it "An incredibly thorough, detailed and accurate conversion of its sport of choice."

=== Allejo ===
Due to lack of licenses of FIFA, Konami created fictional names to represent real players. One of them was Allejo, modeled after Bebeto and considered by some gamers and meme-makers, especially those from Brazil, as the "greatest footballer never to exist".
