= Legendary Eleven =

2018 video game

- Developer: Eclipse Games
- Platforms: Nintendo Switch; PlayStation 4; Microsoft Windows; Xbox One
- Release: June 8, 2018
- Genre: Sports
- Modes: Single-player, multiplayer

Legendary Eleven is a football/soccer video game developed by the Spanish company Eclipse Games and released in 2018 for PC and consoles PlayStation 4, Nintendo Switch and Xbox One.

== Gameplay ==
Inspired by arcade-type football/soccer video games, the game recreates the style of football/soccer of the 70s, 80s and 90s. Its style is purely arcade where the important thing is the direct football/soccer, hard entrances and spectacular shots from midfield that can end in a goal.

The title incorporates a certain strategic component that complements its arcade nature however, such as, for example, the options to choose different types of formations and strategies, and controls that will allow to give measured passes to the gap, make smooth and strong steals of the ball. Likewise, the Super Shot is available, a shot that is almost always a goal but that takes several seconds to be activated after charging a maximum energy bar with passes and dribbles (which remains empty if the ball is lost).

To these simple mechanics are added the stickers that add improvements to the defenders, the midfield, the forwards and even influencing the refereeing decisions. These stickers are chosen just before each game with a maximum of 4 available.

The title features various types of climates with their respective turf aspects such as rain, dry grass, or snowy pitch. As a curiosity, the billboards of the field have trademark names with changed letters.

With simple and intuitive controls, the video game only presents two different game modes: Friendly Matches and Championships. As for the championships are available Africa Cup, Asian Cup, Copa América, European Championship and World Cup.

== Selections ==
36 national teams are present in the game:

- Algeria
- Argentina
- Australia
- Belgium
- Brazil
- Cameroon
- Czechoslovakia
- Chile
- Colombia
- Denmark
- Egypt
- England
- France
- Germany
- Ghana
- Ireland
- Italy
- Japan
- Mexico
- Netherlands
- Nigeria
- Peru
- Poland
- Portugal
- Romania
- Saudi Arabia
- Scotland
- Senegal
- South Korea*
- Soviet Union
- Spain
- Sweden
- Turkey
- Uruguay
- United States
- Yugoslavia
- In the game, it appears as Korea.

== Reception ==
According to Metacritic, the game is rated 54 out of 100 according to critics, and 6.0 out of 10 according to users. Critics praised the ease of use and the sticker system, but had qualms regarding limited options, animation flaws, and limited audio.

== See also ==
- Super Sidekicks
- Tecmo World Cup '90
- Tecmo World Cup Soccer
- International Superstar Soccer
- Neo Geo Cup '98: The Road to the Victory
