= Hat Trick Hero 2 =

1994 video game

- Developer: Neverland
- Publisher: Taito
- Director: Naoyuki Ukeda
- Designer: Takashi Miyasaka
- Programmers: Naoyuki Ukeda; Goro Naemura
- Artists: Manabu Sato; Takashi Miyasaka; Masaya Isogami; Kenji Morita
- Composer: Yukio Nakajima
- Platform: Super Famicom
- Release: JP: July 29, 1994
- Genre: Sports
- Modes: Single-player, multiplayer

Hat Trick Hero 2 (Note: Japanese: ハットトリックヒーロー2, Hepburn: Hato Torikku Hiro Tsu) is a 1994 association football video game developed by Neverland and published by Taito for the Super Famicom. It is the sequel to Hat Trick Hero (1991). A North American release, Super Soccer Champ 2, was planned but not released.

== Gameplay ==
The star player performing the super shot

The game permits players to play soccer on an international level with all the national teams that took part in the 1994 FIFA World Cup, except the inclusion of Japan instead of South Korea.

Most of the text is in Japanese, including the players' surnames. Eight different players can become the captain of the player's team and the team can use one of five different formations (4-4-2, 4-3-3, 3-5-2, WM and libero). All of the formations are used in modern-day soccer except for the WM formation (which saw common use in England during the 1930s). The star player (captain) chosen kicks a shot (super shot or hyper shot) that pushes the goalkeeper into the stands, just like in Hat Trick Hero. Exhibition, world league (similar to a World Cup tournament) and Taito Cup (24 teams to beat) are the three possible variations in the game. After beating all the 23 national teams in the Taito cup mode, there is a final game against a team with the abbreviation "NLC". Mode 7 graphics give the game a sense of perspective.

Hat Trick Hero 2 is the sequel to Football Champ in Japan (where it was known as Hat Trick Hero), and is loosely based on the coin-operated video game Hat Trick Hero '93.

It was released in Japan on July 29, 1994.

== See also ==
- Super Shot Soccer
