= International Superstar Soccer 64 =

1997 association football video game

- European Nintendo 64 cover art
- Developer: Konami Computer Entertainment Osaka
- Publisher: Konami
- Composers: Tsutomu Ogura; Harumi Ueko
- Series: International Superstar Soccer
- Platform: Nintendo 64
- Release: JP: December 20, 1996 (Jikkyō J.League Perfect Striker); PAL: June 1, 1997; NA: August 22, 1997; JP: September 18, 1997 (Jikkyō World Soccer 3); BR - 1998
- Genre: Sports
- Modes: Single-player, Multiplayer

International Superstar Soccer 64 (officially abbreviated as ISS 64, originally released in Japan as Jikkyō J.League Perfect Striker (Note: Japanese: 実況 Ｊリーグ パーフェクトストライカー, Hepburn: Jikkyō J Rīgu Pāfekuto Sutoraikā) and then later adapted as Jikkyō World Soccer 3 (Note: Japanese: 実況 ワールドサッカー 3, Hepburn: Jikkyō Wārudo Sakkā 3)) is a video game developed by Konami Computer Entertainment Osaka in the International Superstar Soccer series by Konami. Its team lineup follows the Super NES version of International Superstar Soccer Deluxe, only with South Africa replacing Morocco.

International Superstar Soccer 64 was met with critical acclaim, and often called one of the best of the Nintendo 64's third-party releases.

== Gameplay ==
International Superstar Soccer 64 gameplay, showing a Germany–France match

The game is similar to the PlayStation version (including the same player names, with the exception of Japan, England and a handful of American players), but with some teams having a more inaccurate home or away kit. The USA, for example, uses their 1994 World Cup Adidas "stripes" kit as their home kit and their then-current Nike home kit as their away kit. Gameplay is similar to that of the Super NES predecessor, International Superstar Soccer Deluxe, upgraded for the Nintendo 64 with 3D animation. While it keeps largely the same team squads (with the teams now sporting near-authentic kits), South Africa debuted in this game as a selectable side, replacing Morocco. However, the Japanese version has teams that are not present in the Western versions: Bolivia, Yugoslavia, Iran, Australia, Canada and Saudi Arabia. In addition, in ISS 64, Turkey is still incorrectly billed as an Asian team rather than European, unlike in Jikkyō World Soccer 3.

There are six game modes, including single match, league battle and penalty shoot-out. The player can assign a team member to cover a specific member of the opposing team. The International Cup has the player competing against a range of teams from around the world in a round-robin tournament, while the World League is a series of 70 matches against every one of other teams in the game.

The player can also contest a penalty shoot-out competition with up to 4 players or attempt to complete certain scenarios. These matches are set up with a specific goal—for example, scoring a goal within a given time limit or stopping the opposing team from scoring.

The game features 36 international teams and supports multiplayer matches with up to four players. Players can also create and trade players. Player movement is represented through thousands of motion-captured animations, incorporating a variety of football techniques, while matches feature real-time play-by-play commentary. GameSpot particularly praised the game's use of the Nintendo 64's analog stick, describing the controls as closely tuned to the fast pace of football.

== Development and release ==
International Superstar Soccer 64 was developed by Konami Computer Entertainment Osaka's Major A team. In an interview with Official UK Nintendo Magazine conducted on 29 January 1997, the developers revealed that production of the original Japanese version, J.League Perfect Striker, had taken approximately one year, including two months spent structuring and organising the artificial intelligence. The project was the team's first Nintendo 64 game, and development was complicated by Konami's lack of existing software libraries for the console. The developers identified the transition to fully three-dimensional graphics, the implementation of the Nintendo 64's analog stick and the coordination of all eleven players through artificial intelligence as major challenges.

The development team prioritised realistic player movement, using motion-capture technology for the first time in the series. A university student who played football performed approximately 300 recorded actions. The team initially designed around 320 movements, of which approximately 270 were motion-captured, with slightly fewer ultimately incorporated into the game. The animations were selected through discussions among a twelve-member team, with an emphasis on reproducing authentic football techniques rather than unrealistic special moves. The artificial intelligence was based on that of the Super Nintendo Entertainment System installments, but expanded to provide more varied positioning and attacking behaviour.

The developers cited Sega Worldwide Soccer 97, known in Japan as Victory Goal, as their principal competitor, regarding it as the strongest football game on 32-bit consoles. For the European release, Konami planned to replace the Japanese J.League teams with international sides, adjust the difficulty, account for PAL display characteristics and modify player appearances to reflect their national teams. The developers also indicated that the European version would be more challenging than the Japanese original.

The European localisation included the production of English-language match commentary. According to Official UK Nintendo Magazine, more than 1,500 speech samples had been recorded by early 1997. The commentary script contained over 200 scenarios, each with multiple alternative lines intended to reflect different match situations and levels of excitement.

== Teams ==
- Germany
- France
- Italy
- Switzerland
- Norway
- Denmark
- Sweden
- Spain
- Portugal
- Netherlands
- England
- Russia
- Croatia
- Romania
- Bulgaria
- Czech Republic
- Japan
- South Korea
- Turkey
- Cameroon
- Nigeria
- South Africa
- Brazil
- Argentina
- Colombia
- Mexico
- Uruguay
- United States

USA/European version exclusive

- Belgium
- Austria
- Greece
- Wales
- Scotland
- Republic of Ireland
- Northern Ireland
- Poland

Japanese version exclusive

- Iran
- Saudi Arabia
- United Arab Emirates
- Paraguay
- Bolivia
- Canada
- Yugoslavia
- Australia

== Commercial performance ==
The game was a commercial success, selling over one million units in Europe. In the United Kingdom, International Superstar Soccer 64 reached number one on the multi-format software chart and was the country's top-selling video game for July 1997. In Sweden, International Superstar Soccer 64 appeared in the top ten of Super Play magazine's retail sales charts for three consecutive issues in 1997. It ranked third in August, fourth in September and sixth in October. The August chart was compiled by Nordic Games, while the September and October rankings were compiled by Design Promotions using reports from Swedish video game retailers. The game also ranked fourth on Super Play magazine's American video game sales chart published in September 1997.

== Reception ==
Reception

Aggregate score
Aggregator	Score
GameRankings	89%

Review scores
Publication	Score
CNET Gamecenter	8/10
Edge	9/10
Electronic Gaming Monthly	9.25/10
Famitsu	(P.S.) 32/40 (WS3) 31/40
Game Informer	9/10
GameFan	96% (Note: In GameFan's viewpoint of the game, one critic gave it a score of 95, and the other 97.)
GameRevolution	B+
GameSpot	7/10
Hyper	94%
IGN	9/10
N64 Magazine	92% (WS3) 91% (P.S.) 89%
Next Generation	(US) 5/5 (JP) 4/5
Nintendo Power	3.75/5

The game met with critical acclaim in Japan. In an interview around the time of the game's release in the region, Shigeru Miyamoto said that "Konami's soccer game may be better than [Nintendo's N64] games. It looks really good." GamePro said that Striker "ranks as the best soccer game for the Japanese N64 and quite possibly one of the best soccer titles in Japan. If you own a Japanese N64, Striker's worth a kick-off." (Note: GamePro gave the Japanese import three 4/5 scores for graphics, sound, and control, and 4.5/5 for fun factor.) Next Generation said that the same Japanese import "goes farther than most titles in presenting a fantastic look and feel. Just make sure you have a few friends around to play it, otherwise you'll tire from 10-3 wins real quick." Famitsu gave it a score of 32 out of 40 for Perfect Striker, and 31 out of 40 for World Soccer 3.

Reception in Europe was highly positive. British magazine Edge said that the Japanese import was "the most versatile and entertaining football game seen on any platform, and forms a strong addition to Nintendo's 64bit [sic] portfolio." French magazine Joypad awarded International Superstar Soccer 64 97%. German magazine MAN!AC gave the game 91 out of 100, praising its responsive controls, varied ball behaviour and fluid presentation, and regarding it as a major technical improvement over the earlier PlayStation version.

Spanish magazine Hobby Consolas awarded the game 97 out of 100, praising its player animations, realism, variety of actions and accessible controls. The magazine regarded its main shortcomings as the absence of club teams and the game being presented in English.

The North American version received favorable reviews, according to the review aggregation website GameRankings. Game Informer gave it universal acclaim, and Nintendo Power gave it a favorable review, over one month before the game was released Stateside. Several critics noted that the A.I. in the game was dramatically improved from the Japanese version. Most said International Superstar Soccer 64 was better than the Nintendo 64's previous soccer game, FIFA Soccer 64, and Kraig Kujawa of Electronic Gaming Monthly went so far as to call it "without a doubt, the best soccer game on the market". GamePro was one of the few to voice criticisms with the game, specifically the music and the use of fictional players, but called it "an arcade-ish experience that, while not as realistic as FIFA, ranks much higher on the fun scale."

The most often cited strengths of the game included a variety of gameplay modes; the wide range of moves that the players can execute; the graceful, lifelike player animations; and the controls, particularly the tight responsiveness and strong implementation of the Nintendo 64 controller's analog joystick. However, most critics found it difficult to cover all of the game's positive elements. For example, Next Generation commented, "Details like refs of varying skill, different weather conditions, real stadiums, and attitude give even more depth to a game that gets just about everything right." Peer Schneider of IGN (then known as N64.com) gave strong praise to International Superstar Soccer 64's multiplayer modes. He later published a longer review which covered a few criticisms, such as the lack of a FIFA license, but also commented more extensively on the game's strong attention to detail, and reemphasized that "As far as multiplayer games go, ISS64 has replaced Mario Kart 64, Star Fox 64 and Wayne Gretzky as the ultimate gameplay experience." Glenn Rubenstein of GameSpot said that it "offers just about everything FIFA 64 did. It just does it slightly better."

Just a few months after the game's North American release, Electronic Gaming Monthly ranked it the 24th best console video game of all time, commenting that "The gameplay is awesome, appealing to both hardcore and casual fans of the sport. The graphics are the best of any sports game, as the attention to detail in the player animations is amazing. ... No soccer game comes close to this one." In its 1997 Editors' Choice Awards, Electronic Gaming Monthly also named International Superstar Soccer 64 "Sports Game of the Year" and a runner-up for "Nintendo 64 Game of the Year" (behind GoldenEye 007). Official Nintendo Magazine ranked it the 81st best game available on Nintendo platforms. The game won the award for "Console Sports Game of the Year" at the Academy of Interactive Arts & Sciences' inaugural Interactive Achievement Awards.

== Legacy ==
The intro of a Peruvian bootleg version of the game intended for the Brazilian market, entitled Mundial Ronaldinho Soccer 64, became a popular Internet meme in 2020. The bootleg, made by Peruvian scene organization Twin Eagles Group, changed the announcer's language to Portuguese (although the commentator actually speaks a mix of Peruvian Spanish and Portuguese; see Portuñol). Named after Ronaldo Nazário (who was known as "Ronaldinho" in his early international career and should not be confused with Ronaldinho, who in Brazil was given the demonym "Gaúcho" to differentiate from Ronaldo), the title screen uses poorly-edited photos of him. It replaces the fictional names of the players with real-life counterparts (with Ronaldo's name overwriting that of in-game striker Allejo), albeit with errors on some, such as Alan Shearer's name being misspelled as "Schearer".
