= International Superstar Soccer 3 =

2003 video game

- PlayStation 2 cover art
- Developer(s): KCEO
- Publisher(s): Konami
- Series: International Superstar Soccer
- Platform(s): PlayStation 2, GameCube, Windows
- Release: EU: March 28, 2003 (PS2); EU: May 30, 2003 (GCN, PC)
- Genre(s): Sports
- Mode(s): Single-player, multiplayer

International Superstar Soccer 3 (officially abbreviated as ISS3) is a football video game and the final installment of the International Superstar Soccer series, developed by the KCEO division of Konami.

== Reception ==
Reception

Aggregate score
Aggregator	Score		
Aggregator	GC	PC	PS2
GameRankings			63%

Review scores
Publication	Score		
Publication	GC	PC	PS2
Eurogamer			6/10
Jeuxvideo.com	15/20	11/20	15/20

On review aggregator GameRankings assigned the game a score of 63%, based on 14 reviews.
