= ISS (2000 video game) =

2000 video game

- European cover art
- Developer: Major A
- Publisher: Konami
- Series: International Superstar Soccer
- Platforms: PlayStation, PlayStation 2, Game Boy Advance
- Release: PlayStation, PlayStation 2: JP: August 3, 2000; EU: November 22, 2000; JP: December 21, 2000 (Final Edition); JP: March 22, 2001 (Jikkyo J-League Perfect Striker 3); Game Boy Advance: EU: November 23, 2001; JP: December 13, 2001
- Genre: Sports
- Modes: Single-player, multiplayer

International Superstar Soccer, abbreviated as ISS and also known as Jikkyou World Soccer 2000, Jikkyou World Soccer 2000 Final Edition, and Jikkyou J-League Perfect Striker 3 in Japan, is a football video game in the International Superstar Soccer series by Konami. International Superstar Soccer is a game for one or two players, or even up to four players with the PlayStation's multitap.

Players can train and edit their teams, and they can change the formations and tactics before the match. During the match, they can adjust camera angles, make substitutions and tactical changes, adjust the game speed, and so on. The main game element is controlling the players, making searching passes, and scoring goals.

ISS 2000 was the first installment in the series to feature fully licensed teams. All teams that competed in the UEFA Euro 2000 tournament, alongside many others, have real players and likeness. Additionally, most international teams have their real kit.
