= Soccer Brawl =

1992 video game

- Developer: SNK
- Publisher: SNK
- Producer: Eikichi Kawasaki
- Designers: S.Chinatsu; T. Yokoyama
- Composer: Yasumasa Yamada
- Platforms: Arcade, Neo Geo AES, Neo Geo CD
- Release: Arcade: WW: February 14, 1992; Neo Geo AES: JP/NA: March 13, 1992; Neo Geo CD: JP: March 31, 1995; NA: October 1996
- Genre: Sports
- Modes: Single-player, multiplayer
- Arcade system: Neo Geo MVS

Soccer Brawl (Note: Japanese: サッカー・ブロール, Hepburn: Sakkā Burōru) is a 1992 association football video game developed and published by SNK for the Neo Geo arcade and home platforms. It was later released on the Wii Virtual Console. Hamster Corporation re-released the game as part of their ACA Neo Geo series for the PlayStation 4, Xbox One, Nintendo Switch, Windows, Android and iOS.

== Gameplay ==
Gameplay screenshot

Soccer Brawl is a futuristic soccer game that uses either bionic people or cyborgs for the players. It is a two-player game where you pick a home land from one of eight countries. After selecting one of two stadiums, SNK Stadium in Osaka or Super Dome in San Francisco, the 5-on-5 soccer match begins with a goalie for each team. You can hold either A for a power shot while on offense, or A for a super shot to disable opponents while on defense. You can perform tackle and slide. Captain wears a kerchief, can't shoot and can make super shot. Power shots rebound from walls except walls behind the goalie.

=== Rules ===
There are no fouls. Throw-in is made in case of the ball landing outside of field line. Match time is 2 min 30 sec.

=== Teams ===
There are 8 teams, which differ by color, super shots and, possibly, some parameters.

- United States (purple and white)
- Germany (yellow and black)
- England (yellow and purple)
- Spain (pink and yellow-green)
- Brazil (yellow-green and yellow)
- Italy (pink and blue)
- South Korea (blue and yellow-green)
- Japan (red and white)

=== Super shots ===
USA and England: super shot flies on a "figure eight" trajectory.

Italy and Germany: super shot flies on zig-zag.

Spain and Brazil: super shot is energy sphere surrounded by eight small balls.

Korea and Japan: super shot flies in a circle behind captain and flies straight.

== Reception ==
Reception

Aggregate score
Aggregator	Score
GameRankings	(Switch) 60%

Review scores
Publication	Score
AllGame	(Neo Geo) 1.5/5
Computer and Video Games	(Neo Geo) 91 / 100
Famitsu	(Neo Geo) 24 / 40
GameFan	(Neo Geo) 182 / 200
GamePro	(Neo Geo) 20 / 20
Jeuxvideo.com	(Neo Geo) 13 / 20
Nintendo Life	(Switch) 6 / 10
Consolemania	(Neo Geo) 86 / 100
Consoles +	(Neo Geo) 85%
Génération 4	(Neo Geo) 90%
Hobby Consolas	(Neo Geo) 96 / 100
Joypad	(Neo Geo) 94%
Joystick	(Neo Geo) 93%
Mega Fun	(Neo Geo) 79%
Micom BASIC Magazine	(Neo Geo)
Player One	(Neo Geo) 71%
Sinclair User	(Neo Geo) 84%
Superjuegos	(Neo Geo) 87,0 / 100

In Japan, Game Machine listed Soccer Brawl on their April 1, 1992 issue as being the eighth most-successful table arcade unit of the month, outperforming titles such as Hat Trick Hero. In North America, Play Meter listed the game in their April 1994 issue to be the sixty most-popular arcade game at the time. The title received mostly positive reception from both critics and reviewers alike since its initial release in arcades and Neo Geo AES.

In 2014, HobbyConsolas identified Soccer Brawl as one of the twenty best games for the Neo Geo CD.

== See also ==
- Super Sidekicks
