= Twin Eagles Group =

Peruvian scener group

- Abbreviation: TEG
- Nickname: Lai Pen Computer Group, EagleSoft
- Formation: 1989
- Dissolved: 2003
- Headquarters: Lima, Peru
- Products: Video games
- Leader: Lobsang “Mr. Byte” Alvites
- Website: https://www.tegperu.org/

Twin Eagles Group (TEG) was a Peruvian demoscene/software piracy group founded in 1989. It originally produced hacked games for the Commodore 64, and would eventually modify games for video game consoles such as the Super NES and Nintendo 64. The group was commissioned to produce their ROM hacks. In part due to the threat of legal action, they would eventually become a legitimate video game developer using the skills they learned from piracy. Due to bankruptcy, TEG was dissolved in 2003. It has been credited with starting the Peruvian video games market.

== History ==
Twin Eagles Group was founded by Lobsang Alvites, commonly known by the pseudonym Mr. Byte, and Overmind. Alvites founded TEG at 16 years old. He was inspired by piracy/demogroups he had seen in Europe and Asia, and planned to found a similar organization in Peru. When TEG was founded, it was based primarily in his house. TEG became famous as a cracking group, adding a cracktro at the beginning before distributing a game. Eventually, it became a major supplier of video games in Peru, and was famous throughout Lima. The games were mostly supplied to TEG from Europe.

With its newfound popularity, TEG grew in size, recruiting many new members of various ages. The members were not paid by Alvites, working with the group because of their passion for computers.

TEG also had a separate group of members that produced ROM hacks, such as Sonic the Hedgehog 4 for Super NES, a hack of Speedy Gonzales: Los Gatos Bandidos. It was famous for making hacks of soccer games like International Superstar Soccer, adding current Latin American teams to them. These hacks were distributed by different sellers all over the world.

However, they stopped producing ROM hacks and pirated games when new copyright laws were passed in Peru. As a result of these laws, they turned to game development. Their first game was titled Gunbee F-99, which was the first commercial video game produced in Peru.

In 2001, former Peru president Alberto Fujimori was succeeded by Alejandro Toledo. TEG decided to use this as a premise for a political video game. The game was titled La Tercera Vuelta, or The Third Round, as inspired by Peru's two-round election system. TEG later created a follow-up game titled The King of Peru, which featuring Alejandro Toledo and Alan García, who were the presidential candidates of the time. A sequel was also created, featuring more characters. However, the computer company distributing the game began to distribute pirated copies, which caused TEG to become bankrupt.

Alvites began working on the production of indie games after the dissolution of TEG.

== Original games ==
Game	Notes	System	Published year
Gunbee F-99	A shooting game inspired by the Super NES game Pop'n TwinBee. The first commercial video game developed in Peru.	Amiga 1200	1998
The King of Peru 2	A political satire fighting game featuring battles between presidential candidates Alberto Fujimori, Alejandro Toledo, Alan García, and Fujimori's secretary of intelligence, Vladimiro Montesinos.		
The King of Peru 2001	A King of Peru game for PC.		

== ROM hacks ==
Game	Notes	System	Published year
Caballeros Del Zodiaco		Super NES	1996
Sonic the Hedgehog	A hack of Speedy Gonzales: Los Gatos Bandidos. Replaces Speedy Gonzales' sprites with Sonic.	Super NES	1996
Caballeros Del Zodiaco 2		Super NES	1997
Sextris	A clone of Tetris with pornographic images added.	Super NES	1997
Futbol Argentino '97	A hack of International Superstar Soccer with Argentinian teams. Versions with Brazilian, Colombian and Peruvian teams also were made.	Sega Genesis	1997
Caballeros Del Zodiaco	A port of the Super NES game.	Game Boy	1997
Ronaldinho Soccer 64	A hack of International Superstar Soccer 64 by Konami that added in South American teams. The title screen intro animation was a popular rickroll-like Internet meme for some time.	Nintendo 64	1998
Sonic the Hedgehog 2	A hack of Sparkster that replaces the main character's sprites with Sonic.	Super NES	1998
