= TEG Federal Credit Union =

- Type: Credit union
- Industry: Financial services
- Founded: 1969, as Taconic Educators and Government Federal Credit Union
- Headquarters: Poughkeepsie, New York, United States
- Key people: Cory Shapiro (President, CEO)
- Total assets: $491 million USD (2025)
- Members: 36,000 (2025)
- Number of employees: 118 (2020)
- Website: tegfcu.com

TEG Federal Credit Union (formerly Taconic Educators and Government Federal Credit Union) is a federally chartered credit union in the New York state. As of December 31, 2025, TEG Federal Credit Union reported total assets of approximately US$491.0 million and membership of 35,655.

== History ==
In 1969, teachers from the Wappingers Central School District decided to create an alternative to the banks they had been using. Desiring a financial institution that would provide fair and equitable treatment, they successfully chartered the Wappingers Central Federal Credit on April 25, 1969, with the National Credit Union Administration (NCUA).

In March 1976, credit union membership expanded to include the government workers of Dutchess County and the credit union's name changed to Taconic Educational and Governmental Federal Credit Union, or TEG Federal Credit Union as it is known by today.

In August 2000, TEG received a new community charter and opened its doors to all who lived, worked, worshiped, or attended school in Dutchess County. The most recent extension of this charter in December 2002 opened up the membership to all who live, work, worship or attend school in New York's Dutchess, Orange and Ulster Counties. TEG Federal provides an annual $1,000 scholarship to student members.

TEG FCU has nine branches at: Commerce Street Poughkeepsie; College Center Poughkeepsie; Beekman (Poughquag); Crystal Run (Middletown); Hyde Park; Modena; Newburgh; Route 376, Wappingers Falls; and Route 9, Wappingers Falls.
