= Mulungu, Paraíba =

Coordinates: 7°01′26″S 35°27′43″W

- Municipality
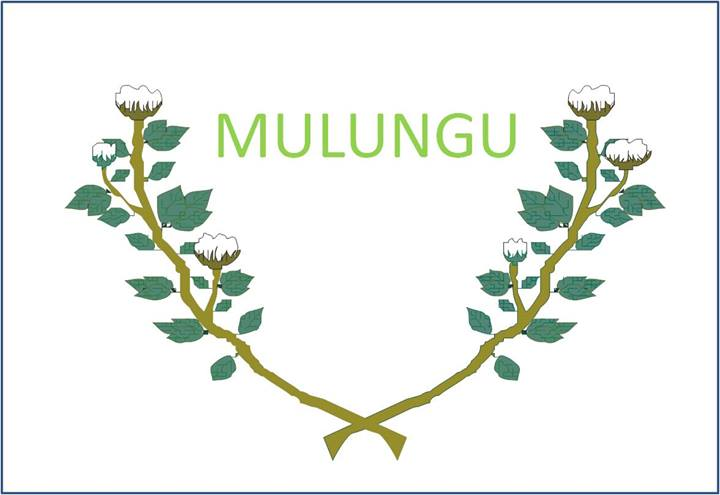
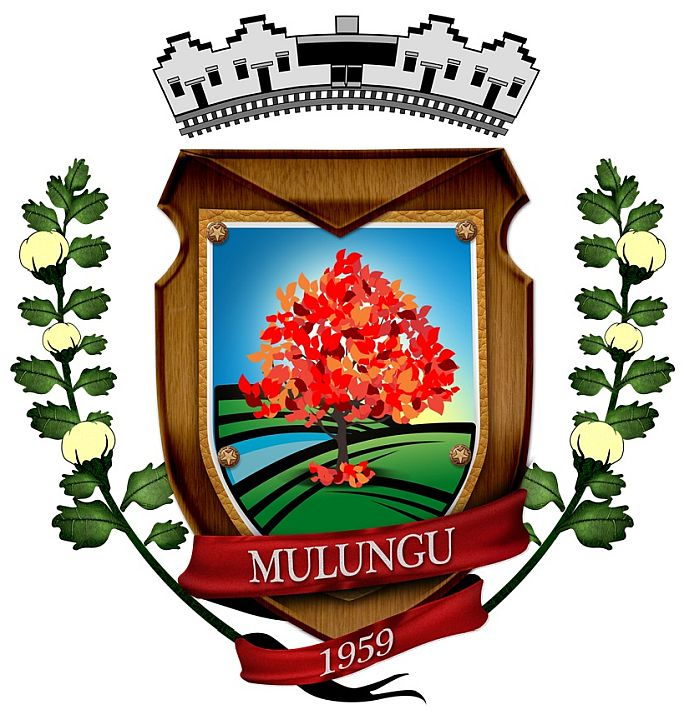
- Flag Coat of arms
- Interactive map of Mulungu, Paraíba
- Country: Brazil
- Region: Northeast
- State: Paraíba
- Mesoregion: Agreste Paraibano

Population (2020)
  - Total: 9,932
- Time zone: UTC−3 (BRT)

Mulungu, Paraíba (Central northeastern portuguese pronunciation: [mulũˈɡu]) is a municipality in the state of Paraíba in the Northeast Region of Brazil.

== See also ==
- List of municipalities in Paraíba
