= Neo Geo Cup '98: The Road to the Victory =

1998 video game

- Developer: SNK
- Publisher: SNK
- Series: Super Sidekicks
- Platforms: Arcade, Neo Geo AES, Neo Geo Pocket, Neo Geo Pocket Color
- Release: Arcade: WW: May 28, 1998; Neo Geo AES: WW: July 30, 1998; Neo Geo Pocket: JP: October 28, 1998; EU: 1998; Neo Geo Pocket Color: JP: April 15, 1999; NA/EU: 1999
- Genre: Sports
- Modes: Single-player, multiplayer
- Arcade system: Neo Geo MVS

Neo Geo Cup '98: The Road to the Victory is a 1998 association football video game developed and published by SNK for the Neo Geo arcade and home platforms. It is based on the FIFA World Cup 1998, despite being released after the World Cup.

The Neo Geo AES version is remarkably different from its MVS version, a rarity within the platform's games. Differences include the Neo Geo version having a slower pace, and more realism added in shooting, passing, etc. A color version of the game was released for the Neo Geo Pocket Color as Neo Geo Cup '98 Plus Color; this version was later re-released as part of Neo Geo Pocket Color Selection Vol. 2 in 2022.

Hamster Corporation re-released the game as part of their ACA Neo Geo series for the PlayStation 4, Xbox One, Nintendo Switch and Windows; this version was removed due to issues regarding the Republic of China.

== Gameplay ==
Each team enters a "Regional Qualifying Round Final" where it plays a team it actually played in the 1998 FIFA World Cup qualification. For example: Spain would face Yugoslavia, an opponent it actually faced in its qualifying group. Or Italy would face Russia, an opponent Italy faced in the UEFA play-offs. If the player beats the opponent, it goes to a group much like the real life World Cup. In fact, the team faces opponents that were actually in its group. For example: Mexico would face the Netherlands, Belgium and South Korea. It is a re-make of Super Sidekicks 3, but the animations and designs were exactly the same. The only difference is teams to reflect the World Cup, kits again to reflect the World Cup, and players to resemble squads from the World Cup (teams that did not qualify use line-ups from friendly games and qualifiers). Its slogan is "We got the kick".

The game has 64 countries, grouped in 8 zones:

Europe (group A) * Italy * Netherlands * Switzerland * Norway * England * Turkey * Portugal * Croatia	Europe (group B) * Germany * Spain * Belgium * Romania * Denmark * Republic of Ireland * Scotland * Czech Republic	Europe (group C) * France * Bulgaria * Sweden * Russia * Greece * Hungary * Austria * FR Yugoslavia	Africa * Nigeria * Cameroon * Morocco * Egypt * South Africa * Zambia * Ivory Coast * Tunisia
North America * United States * Mexico * Canada * Costa Rica * Puerto Rico * Guatemala * El Salvador * Jamaica	South America * Brazil * Argentina * Colombia * Paraguay * Chile * Ecuador * Uruguay * Peru	Asia (group A) * Australia * China * New Zealand * Taiwan * Iran * Iraq * Vietnam * Singapore	Asia (Group B) * Saudi Arabia * South Korea * Japan * United Arab Emirates * Hong Kong * India * Thailand * Malaysia

== Tournaments ==
Arcade version screenshot showcasing a match between Colombia and Puerto Rico.

The tournaments in the game are the following ones (between parenthesis, the real tournaments in which were based):

- World Tournament (1998 FIFA World Cup)
- Europe Tournament (UEFA Euro 1996)
- South America Tournament (1997 Copa América)
- Americas Tournament (1998 CONCACAF Gold Cup)
- Africa Tournament (1998 African Cup of Nations)
- Asia Tournament (1996 AFC Asian Cup)

== Release ==
Neo Geo Cup '98 (ネオジオカップ’９８) is a football videogame released in Japan by SNK Playmore in 1998 for the Neo Geo Pocket handheld system. The game was released in Europe as Neo Geo Cup '98 Plus. It is a scaled down port of the arcade game featuring black and white graphics.

In 1999, an updated version was released in Japan as Neo Geo Cup '98 Plus (ネオジオカップ’９８プラス). This release should not be confused with the previous European release, since the Japanese version of Plus is compatible with the Neo Geo Pocket Color handheld system. The version was released in North America and Europe as Neo Geo Cup '98 Plus Color. It is an update of Neo Geo Cup '98 with, as its title suggests, colour graphics.

In both releases, there are three game modes; single- a single "exhibition" match, 2p play- an option for two players with two Neo Geo Pocket Colour systems, Neo Geo Cup '98 cartridges and a link cable to play against each other, and story mode- a career mode in which players compete in the Neo Geo Cup competition, play friendly matches, play against friends via the link cable and purchase "power-ups" at the Soccer Shop using credits gained in the Neo Geo Cup competition.

== Inconsistencies ==
Due to its failure of getting the official FIFA license (EA Sports held the license) the tournaments are all unlicensed. Also, due to lack of FIFPro license player names are fake. For example: Ronaldo is known as Rosa, Raúl is known as Roul, Luis Hernández is known as Hernardo, Eric Wynalda is known as Wyoming, Carlos Valderrama is known as Valledupar and Martin Dahlin is known as Dahlgren. Despite it, most player's appearance in this game resemble their real-life appearance. Easily identical players are: Colin Hendry (blonde hair), Luis Hernández (blonde hair and caucasian skin), and Jorge Campos (goalkeeper kit) and others appear in the game. Other appearances are inaccurate; for example, Ronaldo is dark-skinned.

Though a majority of team qualifying matches are accurate, there are inconsistencies with some of the team's qualifier opponents. For example, England would face Scotland (although the player can also be paired against Italy, a team England faced in the 1998 qualifiers). Brazil would also play a qualifier against Uruguay. Brazil qualified automatically due to the rule that the winner of the last FIFA World Cup would qualify automatically.

Also, some players have incorrect numbers. For example: Hernán Crespo (Cresko in the game) has the number 11, but in reality he wore number 19, while number 11 was worn by Juan Sebastián Verón.

== See also ==
- Super Sidekicks
- Tecmo World Cup '90
- Tecmo World Cup Soccer
- International Superstar Soccer
- Legendary Eleven
