= Nintendo Magazine System (Australia) =

Former official Nintendo magazine of Australia

- November 1999 cover featuring Jet Force Gemini
- Editor: Natalie Griffith
- Categories: Computer and video game magazines
- Frequency: Monthly
- First issue: April 1993
- Final issue Number: August 2000; 89
- Company: Catalyst Publishing
- Country: Australia

Nintendo Magazine System was the official Nintendo magazine of Australia. In publication for seven years until 2000, the magazine was a branch of Official Nintendo Magazine, the UK's official Nintendo magazine; it was also called Nintendo Magazine System at the time.

The Australian version of NMS was originally published by Trielle Corporation as a 68-page magazine. The first issue appeared in April 1993, and featured Super Mario Land 2 on the cover. It was Australia's official Nintendo magazine, and was very critical to poorly made video game software, with scores for such games often in the low thirties. The magazine often included news and articles not relating to Nintendo products, from information on the idea of virtual reality, to the highest selling coin-operated arcade games at the time.

Starting with Issue 34 in January 1996, Catalyst Publishing took control of the magazine, but retained the issue numbering. The last issue of Nintendo Magazine System was Issue 89, the August 2000 issue. In November 2008, a new official Australian Nintendo magazine was announced.

== See also ==
- Nintendo Power
- Nintendo Official Magazine
