= Hat Trick Hero =

1991 video game

Football Champ
- Arcade flyer
- Developer: Taito
- Publisher: Taito
- Director: Takeshi Kobori
- Designer: Takeshi Kobori
- Programmers: Tatsuo Nakamura; Yuji Iwasaki; Shinji Soyano
- Artists: Takeshi Kobori; Tsutomu Sekimoto; Nobuhiro Hiramatsu
- Composers: Hisayoshi Ogura; Yasuhisa Watanabe
- Platforms: Arcade, Amiga, Atari ST, Commodore 64, Super Nintendo Entertainment System, MS-DOS
- Release: JP: March 1991; NA: May 1991; EU: 1991
- Genre: Sports
- Modes: Single-player, multiplayer

Hat Trick Hero (Note: Japanese: ハットトリックヒーロー, Hepburn: Hatto Torikku Hīrō) is a 1991 association football video game developed and published by Taito for arcades. It was released for Japan in March 1991, then overseas as Football Champ for North America and Europe the same year. It was ported to multiple home consoles and personal computers. The series became one of Taito's franchises and has seen sequels in following years, including Hat Trick Hero '93 and Taito Power Goal.

== Gameplay ==
In-game screenshot

The player must first choose one of eight national football teams, followed by a star player from a choice of four available for each team. In the game, a win is needed to progress to the next game. A draw will end as a 'game over', with no option for penalties, but a chance to continue by restarting the game in which a win was not achieved. Each opposition team is chosen according to a tier strategy, with the player's team removed:

1. Spain and France.
2. Netherlands and Brazil.
3. England and Italy.
4. Argentina and Germany.

Thus, playing with Germany, the first two games will be Spain and France in some order, the second two games will be Netherlands and Brazil in some order, the third two games will be England and Italy in some order, and the seventh game will be Argentina. The game is completed when all seven other teams have been beaten. The level of difficulty increases the further the game progresses. The game notices when individual team players score a hat trick. Scoring hat tricks has the effect of increasing the difficulty as well.

The game gained some notoriety for giving players the ability to use violence (including punches, flying kicks and shirt pulling). Players could get away with this without giving away a free kick as long as the referee was either far enough away or knocked onto the floor. The referee punishes every foul with a yellow card. Red cards occur at the third, seventh and eleventh fouls, although every so often the game appears to miscount. No fourth red card is given by the referee. Besides the rough play, the game introduced the super shot, which occurs with 30 seconds remaining or less and when the score is tied or the player is losing by 1 goal. The star player chosen kicks a shot that pushes the goalkeeper into the stands.

The original eight national teams in the game are:

- Argentina
- Brazil
- England
- France
- Germany
- Italy
- Netherlands
- Spain

Some versions of the game use Japan and USA (e.g. Hat Trick Hero) instead of Spain and France (e.g. Euro Football Champ).

== Home releases ==
A version of the game was released on the Super NES and Amiga by Domark. A ZX Spectrum version was planned but never released. The game was released in its original arcade form on the Taito Legends 2 compilation for the Windows PC, PlayStation 2 and Xbox. The game was also re-released in 2023 on a handheld manufactured by Taito containing their arcade games.

== Reception ==
In the United Kingdom, the game reached number 7 on the arcade charts in 1991.

The arcade version was rated highly, with magazine Zero giving it a 4/5. The Amiga version was given a 64% by Amiga Power, calling the gameplay simple and noting the graphics were not as good as the arcade version. The One Amiga gave it a 71% saying that the Amiga version did not match the smoothness and speed of the original arcade version.

== See also ==
- Hat Trick Hero 2 - the sequel to this game in Japan
- Hat Trick Hero 95 - (a.k.a. "Taito Power Goal", "Taito Cup Finals") - an arcade game
