= Official Nintendo Magazine =

Video game magazine

- Cover of Official Nintendo Magazine UK issue 70, released in June 2011
- Editor: Matthew Castle (UK), Robert Edwards (Australia)
- Categories: Video games
- Frequency: 13 times a year (UK and Australia)
- First issue: 16 February 2006; 20 years ago (UK)
- Final issue: 14 October 2014 (UK)
- Company: Future plc
- Country: United Kingdom, Australia
- Language: English
- Website: Official Nintendo Magazine
- ISSN: 1750-9998

Official Nintendo Magazine, or ONM, was a British video game magazine that ran from 2006 to 2014 that covered the Nintendo DS, Nintendo 3DS, Wii, and Wii U video game consoles released by Nintendo.

Originally published by EMAP as Nintendo Magazine System, the magazine first covered the Nintendo Entertainment System, Super Nintendo Entertainment System and Game Boy consoles, and was later renamed to Nintendo Magazine, Nintendo Official Magazine then, briefly, Nintendo Official Magazine UK. Under these names, it was published by EMAP for twelve years, before the rights were sold to the publisher, Future plc.

The first issue by Future plc was released on 16 February 2006. The magazine then ran for eight years and eight months, concluding with its 114th issue, released on 14 October 2014.

== History ==
Mean Machines, a long-standing British games magazine, split into two separate magazines, focusing on the two then-major video games console companies: Sega and Nintendo. The Sega-based magazine retained the original title, Mean Machines Sega, while the Nintendo magazine was named Nintendo Magazine System (NMS).

The first issue of Nintendo Magazine System was released on 1 October 1992. Its name was later changed to Nintendo Magazine, Nintendo Official Magazine (NOM) then Nintendo Official Magazine UK, before its publisher was changed from EMAP to Future plc. After this change, the magazine was renamed to its current name, Official Nintendo Magazine (ONM), and received a new set of staff. Its numbering was also reset. It reached its 50th issue on 20 November 2009 and its 100th issue in October 2013.

On 15 December 2008, the first issue of Official Nintendo Magazine for Australia & New Zealand, a monthly video game magazine based on Official Nintendo Magazine, was published by Future plc. It was the second officially endorsed Nintendo magazine released in Australia and New Zealand, succeeding the Australian Nintendo Magazine System, which ceased publishing in 2000. Issue 60 and the final issue for Official Nintendo Magazine for Australia & New Zealand was published in December 2013.

In early 2011, four guest bloggers were appointed: Colette Barr, Marti Bennett, Chris Rooke, and John Vekinis. These bloggers provided their perspective to Nintendo-related news and events.

In March 2011, the UK magazine underwent a change in the style and layout of the contents in the magazine, while adding new features. The first issue released in this format featured a "3D without glasses" cover for the launch of Nintendo 3DS.

A new version was introduced in November 2012, with the release of the Wii U. The following year, the magazine celebrated its 100th issue, with cover art drawn by Shigeru Miyamoto.

On 7 October 2014, Future confirmed that the magazine would come to a close with its 114th issue, which was released on 14 October 2014. Furthermore, it was confirmed that the website (including the forums) would be closed 11 November 2014. On 15 October 2014, former moderators of the ONM forums set up a replacement site for the forthcoming closure of the forums. One such community was Super ONM, now merged with similar ex-Future community GRcade, formerly of GamesRadar. Nintendo will now be focusing on its Nintendo Direct, Live Treehouse and other methods to communicate with their fans.

== Sections ==
Each month, the Official Nintendo Magazine included the following sections:

- Welcome – a brief summary of the issue by the editor; also features the contact details
- Meet the Team – an introduction to the different members of the publishing team
- Contents – the articles were broken down into categories (e.g. a review went under the category Review). There is also an A–Z of games features in the issue.
- incoming
  - The Big Story – An overview of recent Nintendo news
  - Mouthpiece – an interview, usually with someone relating to a game in the issue (e.g. in issue 105, an interview with the composer of Donkey Kong Country: Tropical Freeze)
  - World of Nintendo – Nintendo-related news from around the world, including 3DS and Wii U charts
- Next Month – a preview of the next issue
- Nintendo Shopping Channel – picks of eShop and the Nintendo online store
- MiiVERSE
  - Mii Plaza – funny Miiverse posts
  - Connect – letters, emails, Twitter and Facebook posts. Also includes a small transcript of the podcast.
  - ONM Rant – a somewhat controversial opinion, debated by forum users
  - Network
    - ONM Game Night – a review of the online features in a game
    - DLC of the Month – reviews of recent DLC's
  - Smash Update – a round-up of recent Super Smash Bros. news, along with opinions via Miiverse
- Feedback – a section showing the best letters, e-mails and forum posts of the month. A star letter is picked and a prize, is given to the sender. (forum posts are not in AU/NZ edition)
  - In a Word – readers' e-mails, letters and forum posts are replied to in a single word (forum posts are not in AU/NZ edition)
  - My Collection – a short interview with a Nintendo related collection owner
  - The Gallery – pictures that are sent in by readers
- Features – articles about exciting and interesting subjects (e.g. Easter eggs, 50 Greatest..., "The Making Of...", etc.) exclusive to the issue
- Previews – a preview is similar to a review, except a preview is more about what they think the game will turn out to be like rather than what it is actually like
- Reviews – an in-depth look into the latest games and how good or bad they are. The score is given in percentages and a summary is given along with the good and bad points of the game
  - Round up – a quick summary of the worst of the month's games or the most minor releases.
- Continue
  - The Making of... – an interview with some of a recent game's developers
  - Rewind – a look back at a classic game
  - Time Capsule – 10 games around a certain theme (e.g. Christmas levels etc.)
  - Classic Moment – a look back at an unforgettable moment in a classic game
  - Rated Wii – the top 20 Wii games, features a "Don't Forget" game as well as "High Five", a top five list, and "Settling Scores" where a reader complains about a certain game score
  - The Best of... – the top 27 games, also features "In the Mood for..."
    - Wii U
    - 3DS & 2DS
    - 3DS & 2DS eShop
  - FAQs...
    - 3DS & 2DS – also includes a guide on 3DS System Transfer
  - Legends – A mini-review of a popular game
    - Wii
    - DS
  - The Back Page – often includes a somewhat humorous article (e.g. Nair-tendo)

== Scoring system ==
The Official Nintendo Magazine used a percentage scoring system. The final system used was:

- 0–29% = Toxic
- 30–49% = Troubled
- 50–69% = Flawed
- 70–79% = Bronze
- 80–89% = Silver
- 90–100% = Gold

The highest rated games ever were The Legend of Zelda: Ocarina of Time 3D tied with The Legend of Zelda: Skyward Sword, which both possessed a 98% rating, given in the July 2011 issue and June 2010 issue respectively. Super Mario Galaxy, Super Mario Galaxy 2 and The Legend of Zelda: Twilight Princess were all given ratings of 97%. The lowest rated games were the DSiWare games Discolight and Flashlight, which were given scores of 2% and 3% respectively.

== Forums ==
The ONM UK forums were created in 2006. ONM AU/NZ does not have a forum. In 2011, they were updated along with the magazine to make a cleaner, easier-to-use website. The forums closed 11 November 2014. The Moderating team set up a forum to replace this, called Super Online Nintendo Messageboards. (It was abbreviated as either S ONM or Super-ONM. However, the abbreviation was changed to dodge infringements of any trademark registered for the former magazine).

== See also ==
- Mean Machines (UK, defunct)
- Nintendo Power (US, defunct)
- Nintendo Magazine System (Australia) (defunct)
- Nintendo Gamer (UK, defunct)
- Nintendo Dream (Japan)
- Nintendo World (Brazil)
