= International Superstar Soccer =

- Genre: Sports
- Developer: Konami
- Publisher: Konami
- Platforms: Game Boy, Game Boy Advance, Game Boy Color, Nintendo 64, PlayStation, PlayStation 2, GameCube, Genesis, Saturn, Super NES, Windows, Xbox
- First release: International Superstar Soccer; November 11, 1994
- Latest release: International Superstar Soccer 3 March 28, 2003
- Spin-offs: Pro Evolution Soccer

International Superstar Soccer (known as Jikkyō World Soccer in Japan) is the name of a series of football video games developed by Japanese company Konami, mostly by their Osaka branch, Konami Computer Entertainment Osaka (KCEO). Titles in the series appeared on Super NES, Mega Drive, Nintendo 64, Saturn, PlayStation, PlayStation 2, Xbox, GameCube, and Microsoft Windows.

== Releases ==
=== Consoles and computers ===
Europe and North America		Japan		Platforms
Name	Release date	Name	Release date	Platforms
International Superstar Soccer	May 23, 1995	Jikkyō World Soccer: Perfect Eleven	November 11, 1994	Super NES
International Superstar Soccer Deluxe	January 25, 1996	Jikkyō World Soccer 2: Fighting Eleven	September 22, 1995	Super NES, Mega Drive/Genesis, PlayStation
International Superstar Soccer 64	June 1, 1997	Jikkyō J-League Perfect Striker	December 20, 1996	Nintendo 64
International Superstar Soccer 64	June 1, 1997	Jikkyō World Soccer 3	September 18, 1997	Nintendo 64
—N/a	—N/a	J-League Jikkyō Honō no Striker	February 26, 1998	Sega Saturn
International Superstar Soccer 98	September 1, 1998	Jikkyō World Soccer: World Cup France 1998	June 4, 1998	Nintendo 64
International Superstar Soccer 2000	October 6, 2000	Jikkyō J-League 1999 Perfect Striker 2	July 29, 1999	Nintendo 64
International Superstar Soccer	August 3, 2000	Jikkyō J-League 1999 Perfect Striker	December 2, 1999	PlayStation
International Superstar Soccer	August 3, 2000	Jikkyō World Soccer 2000	August 3, 2000	PlayStation 2
International Superstar Soccer	August 3, 2000	Jikkyō World Soccer 2000: Final Edition	December 21, 2000	PlayStation 2
International Superstar Soccer	August 3, 2000	Jikkyō J-League Perfect Striker 3	March 22, 2001	PlayStation 2
International Superstar Soccer 2	May 3, 2002	Jikkyō World Soccer 2001	September 6, 2001	PlayStation 2, GameCube, Xbox
International Superstar Soccer 2	May 3, 2002	Jikkyō J-League Perfect Striker 4	December 27, 2001	PlayStation 2
International Superstar Soccer 3	March 28, 2003	Jikkyō World Soccer 2002	May 16, 2002	PlayStation 2, GameCube, Windows
International Superstar Soccer 3	March 28, 2003	Jikkyō J-League Perfect Striker 5	July 25, 2002	PlayStation 2

=== Portable ===
Europe and North America		Japan		Platforms
Name	Release date	Name	Release date	Platforms
International Superstar Soccer	August 21, 1998	World Soccer GB	June 4, 1998	Game Boy
International Superstar Soccer 99	2000	World Soccer GB 2	June 1999	Game Boy Color
International Superstar Soccer 2000	September 2000	World Soccer GB 2000	July 2000	Game Boy Color
International Superstar Soccer	November 2001	Jikkyō World Soccer Pocket	December 2001	Game Boy Advance
International Superstar Soccer Advance	January 2003	Jikkyō World Soccer Pocket 2	November 2002	Game Boy Advance

=== Goal Storm / ISS Pro series ===
Europe and North America		Japan		Platforms
Name	Release date	Name	Release date	Platforms
Goal Storm	January 15, 1996	World Soccer Winning Eleven	March 15, 1996	PlayStation
ISS Pro / Goal Storm 97	June 15, 1997	Winning Eleven 97	June 5, 1997	PlayStation
ISS Pro 98	August 21, 1998	Winning Eleven 3	May 28, 1998	PlayStation
ISS Pro Evolution	February 25, 2000	Winning Eleven 4	September 2, 1999	PlayStation
ISS Pro Evolution 2	March 23, 2001	World Soccer Jikkyō Winning Eleven 2000: U-23 Medal Heno Chousen	August 24, 2000	PlayStation

== See also ==
- List of Konami games
- Konami Hyper Soccer
- Super Sidekicks
- International Track & Field
- Legendary Eleven
