= Super Sidekicks =

Video game series

Super Sidekicks is a series of soccer video games made by SNK for its console, the Neo-Geo. Released in the 90s with an arcade-style approach to soccer, the games of the franchise allow players to choose any of the available game modes to compete with AI-controlled rivals or other human players with their preferred team. Though first launched for the MVS hardware, the series were ported for Neo Geo AES and Neo Geo CD, in addition of being re-released through compilations and download services for various consoles.

== Original Super Sidekicks ==
Published in 1992, the original Super Sidekicks (known as "Tokuten Ou", "Goal-Scoring King" in Japan) was SNK's first soccer video game and the second soccer game released for Neo Geo MVS, succeeding Soccer Brawl (1992). Its gameplay uses a simplified two-button configuration. It features 12 teams divided into two groups which compete for the "SNK Cup".

The title proved popular among players and garnered positive reception from critics; praise was directed towards the graphic presentation and fast gameplay but criticism was geared towards several aspects.

== Super Sidekicks 2: The World Championship ==
Published in 1994 (Japanese title: "Tokuten Ou 2 - Real Fight Football"), Super Sidekicks 2: The World Championship corrected most of the flaws in the original's design, including the ability to switch players' control during the game and a smaller goal. It increased the number of teams to 48 and divided them into 6 geographical regions.

Its gameplay uses a simplified three-button configuration. The title proved popular among players and garnered critical acclaim from critics, with praise directed towards improvements made over its predecessor.

== Super Sidekicks 3: The Next Glory ==
Published in 1995 (Japanese title: "Tokuten Ou 3 - Eikoue no Michi", "Goal-Scoring King 3: Path to the Glory"), Super Sidekicks 3: The Next Glory features 64 national teams divided into 8 regions. It proved popular among players and garnered positive reception from critics, but most reviewers noted that it felt more like an update than a true successor to Super Sidekicks 2.

=== Neo Geo Cup '98: The Road to the Victory ===
Neo Geo Cup '98: The Road to the Victory is based on the FIFA World Cup 1998, despite being released after the 1998 FIFA World Cup.

It is a re-make of Super Sidekicks 3, but the animations and designs were exactly the same. The only difference is teams and kits to reflect the World Cup and players to resemble squads from the World Cup (teams that did not qualify use line-ups from friendly games and qualifiers). It served as the final entry in the Super Sidekicks saga.

== The Ultimate 11: SNK Football Championship ==
Published in 1996 (Japanese title: "Tokuten Ou - Honoo no Libero", "Goal-Scoring King: The Flaming Sweeper"), The Ultimate 11: SNK Football Championship received positive reception from critics but proved to be less popular than previous titles of the series. Despite the title, it is still considered the fourth game in the Super Sidekicks series. It features 80 national teams divided into 8 regions.

== See also ==
- Tecmo World Cup '90
- Football Champ
- International Superstar Soccer
- Neo Geo Cup '98: The Road to the Victory
- Legendary Eleven
- Soccer Brawl
