= Worldwide Soccer: Euro Edition =

Sega Worldwide Soccer is a series of soccer games by Sega initially for the Sega Saturn but later moved to the Dreamcast.

== History ==
Sega Worldwide Soccer, produced by Sega themselves was one of the killer apps in the peak of popularity for the console. It was preceded by Victory Goal, an already ageing football game (one of the debut titles of the console). The game featured international teams and league, play-off and tournament modes. Although it used fictional player names (due to the lack of a license), the non-volatile memory of the Saturn allowed editing of names. The team kits were as close to the official 1996 kits as possible. The gameplay was also highly praised, and was the top-rated football game until ISS 64 was released one year later. Worldwide Soccer was later ported to the PC.

One year later Sega Worldwide Soccer 98 was released, again for the Saturn. This version featured (still unlicensed) clubs from England, Spain and France, two new stadiums and the same free-flowing gameplay. However, it could do little for the ailing console, which had one of its worst moments when its version of FIFA: Road to World Cup 98 was completely levelled by critics.

One final title, Sega Worldwide Soccer 2000, appeared on the Dreamcast. However, instead of being developed in-house, Silicon Dreams (who previously worked with Eidos on the UEFA Champions League series and also World League Soccer) was given the rights to produce a game bearing the Worldwide Soccer name. While the first title left most fans pleased visually, but disappointed with the gameplay, a Euro Edition (capitalizing on the popularity of Euro 2000) was released in Europe and returned some credibility to the franchise. It still lost out to the arcade attraction of Virtua Striker 2. It was only released for European Sega Dreamcasts, and features, similar to Sega Worldwide Soccer '98: Club Edition, local teams as well as national ones. There are also upgrades in terms of graphics and more gameplay options. Regarding player licenses, this game takes the same position as World League Soccer 98; that is, player names will resemble those of their real life counterparts, but will not be exactly the same (although curiously, game commentators will pronounce them correctly).

== Installments ==
Title	Release date	Console(s)	Alternative titles
Worldwide Soccer: Sega International Victory Goal Edition	1995	Saturn	International Victory Goal (Europe); Sega International Victory Goal (Japan)
Sega Worldwide Soccer '97	October 31, 1996	Saturn, Windows	Victory Goal Worldwide Edition (Japan); Worldwide Soccer PC (PC)
Sega Worldwide Soccer '98	1998	Saturn	Sega Worldwide Soccer '98 Club Edition (Europe)
Sega Worldwide Soccer 2000	December 1, 1999	Dreamcast	-
Sega Worldwide Soccer 2000 Euro Edition	June 30, 2000	Dreamcast	-
