= Sega Worldwide Soccer '98 =

1997 video game

- Developer: Sega
- Publisher: Sega
- Series: Sega Worldwide Soccer
- Platforms: Sega Saturn, Windows
- Release: EU: October 16, 1997; NA: November 18, 1997; JP: March 5, 1998
- Genre: Sports video game
- Modes: Single-player, multiplayer

Sega Worldwide Soccer '98, known in North America as simply Worldwide Soccer '98 and in Europe as Sega Worldwide Soccer '98 Club Edition, is a video game developed and published by Sega for the Sega Saturn in 1997 and Windows in 1998 only in Japan and in 1999 in North America as Worldwide Soccer Championship . It is the third game in its series, following Victory Goal and Sega Worldwide Soccer 97.

== Development ==
Sega Worldwide Soccer '98 used the same game engine as its predecessor, Sega Worldwide Soccer '97. Cobi Jones played an advisory role in the game's development and served as its spokesperson.

English commentary was provided by Gary Bloom (known for his appearances on Football Italia) and Jack Charlton. The English commentary had longer sentences than the Japanese commentary, so more memory needed to be allocated to buffering on the sound chip for the English version. The developers were aware of this issue but did not get around to addressing it due to the game being rushed to release; as a result, playback of the commentary stops and starts again in a manner similar to stuttering.

The Japanese Saturn release supported XBAND network functionality, allowing players to compete in long-distance matches and view rankings online. Japanese magazine Saturn Fan highlighted this feature alongside compatibility with Sega's analogue Multi Controller. The game featured 108 teams, comprising 48 national sides and 60 clubs from England, France and Spain, while two additional stadiums brought the total number of selectable venues to five.

In South Korea, the Sega Saturn version was imported by Kama Entertainment. The February 1998 issue of Game Champ listed the game as available for purchase at a retail price of 50,000 won.

== Reception ==
Reception

Review scores
Publication	Score
Computer Games Strategy Plus	3/5 (PC)
Electronic Gaming Monthly	5.5/10 (SAT) (Note: Two critics of Electronic Gaming Monthly gave the Saturn version each a score of 5.5/10, and the rest gave it 7.0/10 and 4.0/10.)
Famitsu	29/40 (SAT)
Game Informer	9/10 (SAT)
GameFan	95% (SAT) (Note: In GameFan's viewpoint of the Saturn version, one critic gave it 96, and another 94.)
GameRevolution	B (PC)
GameSpot	6.2/10 (PC)
Next Generation	4/5 (SAT)
PC Gamer (US)	79% (PC)
Sega Saturn Magazine	94% (SAT)

The game received mixed reviews; most critics wrote that the game was too unchanged from its predecessor. The four reviewers of Electronic Gaming Monthly particularly complained at the inability to change the position of players during breaks in the play, and John Ricciardi summarized that "The addition of Club teams is nice, and the engine seems to have been polished up a bit, but otherwise this is pretty much the same game as last year with some annoying faults." Sega Saturn Magazine similarly judged that "there's little to justify purchasing this game if you already own the '97 edition. Sure, it has all the current Premiership sides and players, but at the end of the day, it plays virtually identically ..." GamePro similarly held that there weren't enough changes, and recommended holding out for the Saturn port of FIFA: Road to World Cup 98 instead. (Note: GamePro gave the Saturn version 4.0/5 for graphics, 4.0/5 for fun factor, 3.0/5 for sound, and 3.5/5 for control.) Next Generation was an exception, arguing that "Sega has made a wise decision to leave well enough alone with the third game in the series. Rather than making sweeping changes in gameplay, the designers have tweaked things a bit and stuffed enough little features into the game to make it a worthy update."

Some reviewers particularly criticized the lack of improvement in the goalie AI, though the greater racial accuracy of the player models as compared to Sega Worldwide Soccer '97 was praised. Also, despite the general criticism of the lack of improvements, critics for both Sega Saturn Magazine and GamePro felt that the graphics were good enough that no improvement was needed.

European reception was generally positive, although several reviewers noted the limited changes from its predecessor. French magazine Player One awarded Sega Worldwide Soccer '98 90%, praising the addition of club competitions and the series' established gameplay while noting that the underlying game had changed relatively little. German magazine MAN!AC gave the game 82 out of 100, praising its presentation, extensive options, controls and multiplayer modes, but criticising the absence of German clubs and considering the improvements over Sega Worldwide Soccer '97 relatively minor. Likewise, German magazine Sega Magazin awarded the Saturn version 90%, praising its accessible controls, improved animations and overall presentation. However, reviewer Oliver Preißner considered the changes from Sega Worldwide Soccer '97 relatively minor and criticised the continued absence of German-language commentary.

Italian magazine Mega Console awarded the European Club Edition 86 out of 100. The magazine praised its gameplay and expanded selection of teams, but considered many of its changes incremental and noted that the previous game remained competitive with the new release. Spanish magazine Hobby Consolas gave the game 90 out of 100, particularly praising the addition of the Spanish league and the ability to edit players and teams, while observing that the graphics and core gameplay remained largely unchanged from the previous instalment.

Brazilian magazine Ação Games awarded the Saturn version a score of 8 out of 10 in January 1998, describing it as the best football game available for the console. Reviewer Ivan David praised improvements to the shooting controls, ball physics and sound, including the addition of commentary. However, he criticised the game's occasional awkward animations, unattractive-looking goals and low difficulty.

South Korean magazine Game Champ published a four-page feature on the Saturn version in February 1998. Contributor Park Jin-ho considered its underlying gameplay system largely unchanged from the earlier Victory Goal: Worldwide Edition, describing it as effectively an updated version of that game.

Japanese reception was more reserved. Sega Saturn Magazine awarded the Saturn version scores of 7, 7 and 5 out of 10, averaging 6.33. The first reviewer praised the selection of teams, enthusiastic commentary and presentation of fouls, but found the analogue Multi Controller awkward to use and wanted greater refinement. The second reviewer appreciated the Multi Controller and XBAND compatibility, but felt that the game offered insufficient improvements over the earlier Victory Goal titles and criticised the unnatural behaviour of the goalkeepers. The third reviewer was more negative, complaining that the players appeared too small on screen, automatic player switching could interfere with manual control, and the radar was difficult to read. In the magazine's final reader rankings, published in 2000, the game placed 528th out of 945 Saturn games, with an average score of 7.4687 out of 10.

== Legacy ==
In December 1997, Sega Worldwide Soccer '98 was featured on the Channel 4 television programme GamesMaster, in which English footballer Sol Campbell competed against Scottish footballer Christian Dailly. That same month, the game was featured in a promotional article titled "Mystic Ted" in Manchester United magazine. England international Teddy Sheringham was invited to use Sega Worldwide Soccer '98 to predict the outcome of the 1998 FIFA World Cup final, playing an exhibition match between England and Italy. The feature included photographs of Sheringham playing the Sega Saturn version and screenshots of the game's team-selection and match-setup options.

In February 1998, the British Sega Saturn Magazine ranked Sega Worldwide Soccer '98 14th in its list of the 50 best Sega Saturn games. The magazine considered it superior to contemporary football games in the FIFA and Actua Soccer series, praising its artificial intelligence, graphical presentation and gameplay.

In March 1998, Marketing Week reported that Sega was expanding its Sega Sports brand into clothing and sporting equipment in an effort to appeal to older consumers. The company was developing branded footballs and basketballs through Dutch manufacturer Smits, alongside plans for other sporting products. The publication identified Sega Worldwide Soccer '98 and NBA Action 98 as games whose subject matter informed the merchandising initiative.

The series subsequently continued on the Dreamcast with Sega Worldwide Soccer 2000, developed by Silicon Dreams Studio rather than Sega's previous development team. The studio had previously developed World League Soccer '98 and Olympic Soccer.

In 2025, the Sega Saturn enthusiast community Sega Saturn Shiro! organised an online Worldwide Soccer '98 tournament using modern NetLink tunnelling technology. The competition featured 22 participants and concluded in April 2026.
