= FIFA 97 =

1996 video game

- European PC cover art, featuring David Ginola
- Developer: Extended Play Productions (Note: Saturn version developed by Perfect Entertainment; SNES version developed by Rage Software; Mega Drive/Genesis version developed by XYZ Productions; Game Boy version developed by Tiertex Design Studios.)
- Publishers: EA Sports; Game Boy; Black Pearl Software
- Composers: Michael J. Sokyrka; Joel Simmons; Windows; Graeme Coleman
- Series: FIFA
- Engine: Virtual Stadium
- Platforms: Windows, MS-DOS, Game Boy, Mega Drive/Genesis, Super NES, PlayStation, Sega Saturn
- Release: 20 November 1996: MS-DOS, Windows; NA: 20 November 1996; EU: 22 November 1996 PlayStation; EU: 22 November 1996; NA: 13 December 1996 Mega Drive/Genesis, Super NES; NA: November 1996; EU: 22 November 1996 Saturn; NA: 20 March 1997; EU: 4 April 1997
- Genre: Sports (association football)
- Modes: Single-player, multiplayer

FIFA 97 (also known as FIFA Soccer 97) is an association football simulation video game published by EA Sports. It was released for Windows, MS-DOS, PlayStation, Super Nintendo Entertainment System, and Mega Drive, in 1996, with the Saturn version to follow in 1997.

FIFA 97 is the fourth game in the FIFA series and the second to use the Virtual Stadium engine. Unlike the first game to use the engine, FIFA 97 features polygonal players as opposed to the 2D sprites used in FIFA Soccer 96. The MS-DOS, Windows, and PlayStation versions were criticized for being sluggish.

Frenchman David Ginola (then a Newcastle United player) was pictured on the cover of the game in the European market. He was also used for motion capture for the polygonal models in the game, while Brazilian Bebeto was on the cover for the Americas and Asia-Pacific markets.

== Game features ==
Screenshot of the Sega Genesis version

The main new feature of the game other than the motion capture was the indoor football mode. There are six ways to play the game, including outdoor and indoor, as well as action and simulation modes. 32-bit AI is used, as well as motion blending technology. It is possible to play six-a-side football in an indoor arena with the ball bouncing off the walls, meaning there are no throw-ins and therefore a much higher-paced game. Commentary is provided by John Motson and Andy Gray while the presenter is Des Lynam. Multiplayer games are also possible with up to 20-players via LAN and 8-players using a modem. The game trailer's tagline was "FIFA 97, it will blow you away."

Most European domestic leagues are featured in the game, including the English Premier League, La Liga, French Division 1, Serie A, Bundesliga, Eredivisie, Allsvenskan and Scottish Football League, with the clubs featured in the game playing in the 1995–96 season. Also featured are teams in the Malaysian Liga Perdana and national teams, as well as the American A-League clubs with fictional teams, composed of the game's creators such as Bruce McMillan and Penny Lee.

It is also possible to field custom teams made up of players from various real teams. However, these teams can only be played with in friendly matches.

== Commentary ==
The game's commentary included the names of the majority of players on the game, and the names of the teams were also said by John Motson. To keep the commentary from sounding too robotic, EA Sports recorded Motson saying each phrase four different times, each time in a different tone. Several errors plagued the game's commentary, such as John Millar of Heart of Midlothian being referred to as Joe Miller, who in fact plays for Aberdeen in the game. Also, at times when a goal kick was awarded, the commentator would say that the kick had been given to the opposing team. Another similar error was that a kick-off would be referred to as a cross, as well as a goal in the first minute being described as a goal "that would win it surely". On rare occasions, when the game was being introduced by Des Lynam, the name of a player involved in the game would be said by John Motson, instead of Lynam saying the names of both teams. For example, a match between Partick Thistle F.C. and Kilmarnock F.C. would sometimes be introduced by Lynam saying "Welcome to the big match between-", and Motson's voice interjecting with "MacPherson."

The pronunciation of certain players' names would change depending upon whether they were performing attacking or defensive duties, such as Roy Aitken being referred to as "Akin" if he made a tackle or clearance. Similarly, Alessandro Del Piero, who was called "Del Piero Togon" on the game, was referred to as "Del Piero Tognon", followed by a small hiccuping noise when he performed a tackle.

== Reception ==
Reception

Review scores
Publication	Score
AllGame	4/5 (PS)
Computer and Video Games	2/5 (PS)
Edge	6/10 (PS)
Electronic Gaming Monthly	6.75/10 (PS)
EP Daily	6/10 (PS); 5/10 (SAT); 9.5/10 (SMD); 6.5/10 (SNES)
GameSpot	8.2/10 (PC); 7.1/10 (PS)
Hyper	95% (PS & SAT)
Mega Fun	79% (PS); 83% (SMD)
Next Generation	1/5 (PS)
Official Nintendo Magazine	85/100 (GB)
Video Games (DE)	88% (PS); 82% (SMD); 80% (SNES)
Saturn Power	74/100 (SAT)
Sega Saturn Magazine	76% (SAT)

FIFA 97's computer version received a "Gold" sales award from the Verband der Unterhaltungssoftware Deutschland (VUD), indicating sales of at least 100,000 units across Germany, Austria and Switzerland.

The PlayStation version received a wide range of reviews. GamePro gave it a rave review, particularly applauding the motion captured animations, crowd noises, and "detailed, side-busting commentary". GameSpot's Stephen Poole disagreed on the commentary, noting that it is on occasion blatantly inaccurate. However, he opined that the slower pace of the gameplay is more realistic. Additionally praising the new indoor soccer feature, motion capture animation, and sharply rendered players, he concluded the game "does not disappoint." A reviewer for Next Generation, however, insisted that "The simple, sad fact is FIFA '97 is the most disappointing EA Sports game in years." He argued that the slow pace, rather than being realistic, is simply boring. He acknowledged that the visuals are good and the features are comprehensive, but found the slow pace, frame rate, control, and unrealistic ball physics make FIFA '97 a poor offering. The two sports reviewers of Electronic Gaming Monthly took a middle ground, complimenting the graphics, stats, and realism, but agreeing with Next Generation that the play suffers from the slow pace and controls. They rated it overall decent, but not a contender against the leading soccer games.

Both Play magazine in Issue 15 and Official UK PlayStation Magazine in Issue 15 rated the PlayStation version of the game similarly with a score of 70% and 7/10 respectively. Play when comparing it with FIFA 96 commented that it was "Graphically better, but plays worse".

Reviews for the Saturn port were more uniformly middling. Critics often compared it unfavorably to Sega Worldwide Soccer 97. GamePro also noted that the graphics and audio are inferior to those of the PlayStation version. Saturn Power mentioned numerous aggravations with the controls and configurations, and summarized it as "Almost perversely entertaining for a game as flawed as it is." Sega Saturn Magazine's Rich Leadbetter found the AI too heavily flawed to provide an accurate simulation of soccer. Like Price, he deemed the game enjoyable despite its flaws, but concluded Sega Worldwide Soccer '97 to be indisputably a wiser purchase.

Continental European reviews reached similar conclusions. German magazine MAN!AC awarded the Saturn version 77%, praising its extensive controls, options, statistics and indoor mode, but criticizing its jerky scrolling and animation; it warned players expecting the technical polish and fluidity of Sega Worldwide Soccer 97 that FIFA 97 would disappoint. Italian magazine Mega Console gave it 76 out of 100. Although it considered the game an improvement over FIFA Soccer 96 and praised its range of options and presentation, it criticized the opposing artificial intelligence for making matches repetitive and predictable, and likewise regarded Sega Worldwide Soccer 97 as the superior Saturn football game.

The Genesis and Super NES versions were reviewed in GamePro by two different critics. Both concluded that the game is a must-have for newcomers to the series, but that FIFA fans would likely find the game redundant due to the minimal change from previous installments. In Brazil, FIFA 97 ranked eighth among Tec Toy's best-selling Mega Drive games, according to a company sales study published by UOL in 2004.

GamePro also ran a brief review of the Game Boy version, praising it for managing easy-to-follow graphics despite the small screen. They added, "The gameplay isn't exactly speedy – the sprites lope downfield at a sluggish pace – but it's fun working your way through a lengthy tournament to the championship. In 1998, Saturn Power ranked the game 95th on their Top 100 Sega Saturn Games. They found the game to be an improvement over its predecessor although it still has some flaws.

== See also ==
- FIFA Soccer 64, a Nintendo 64 game announced as FIFA Soccer 97
