= UEFA Dream Soccer =

2000 football video game

- Developer(s): Silicon Dreams Studio
- Publisher(s): Sega
- Platform(s): Dreamcast
- Release: EU: December 8, 2000
- Genre(s): Sports
- Mode(s): Single-player, multiplayer

UEFA Dream Soccer is a football video game developed by Silicon Dreams Studio and published by Sega for the Dreamcast in 2000.

== Gameplay ==
The game offers several game modes - Global Domination, Survival, Time Attack, Gender Challenge, Team Challenge, Versus and several leagues and tournaments - and features commentary from Alan Green and Barry Venison and pre-match introductions from Helen Chamberlain. Female players are included for all national teams and players can pit male players against female players in the Gender Challenge mode.

== Development ==
The title was originally envisaged as another entry in the Sega Worldwide Soccer series but was renamed due to a publishing agreement between Sega and Infogrames, the latter of which having already published UEFA Striker for the Dreamcast.

The developers claimed to have captured 20,000 motions during development and used 2,500 polygons per player.

It was among the first video games to feature playable female teams, releasing just a month after Mia Hamm Soccer 64, which was also developed by Silicon Dreams Studio and is regarded as the first.

== Reception ==
Johnny Minkley gave the title 3/5 in CVG, praising the range of game modes, "easy to pick up" controls, but criticising unresponsive controls, dull commentary, repetitive cut scenes and the easy difficulty. Writing in Dreamcast Magazine, Alex Warren awarded the game 91%, describing it as "quite simply the most comprehensive, best-looking and most enjoyable football title yet to grace Sega's little box of wonders". DC-UK's Lee Hart was less positive, arguing that the sluggishness of the player animation meant that the "quick passing, instinctive game that Sega Worldwide Soccer encouraged has gone forever", and giving a score of 6/10. The game received a score of 5/10 in Official Dreamcast Magazine with reviewer Steve Key arguing that little had been changed from Silicon Dreams previous football titles on the console and criticising several gameplay aspects including poor player positioning, the tackling system and switching between controllable players.
