= FIFA Soccer 64 =

1997 video game

- North American cover art featuring Jordi Cruyff
- Developer: EA Canada
- Publisher: EA Sports
- Series: FIFA
- Platform: Nintendo 64
- Release: NA: March 27, 1997; EU: April 1997
- Genre: Sports
- Modes: Single-player, multiplayer

FIFA Soccer 64, known in Europe as FIFA 64 and in Japan as J. League Live 64 (Note: J Rīgu Raibu 64 (Jリーグブ64)), is an association football video game developed by EA Canada and published by Electronic Arts for the Nintendo 64. The US cover features Manchester United midfielder Jordi Cruyff. The game garnered mixed reviews from critics upon release. Although its simulation was generally praised as realistic, reviewers critiqued the jerky animation, choppy frame-rates, unresponsive controls, and underwhelming usage of the Nintendo 64's capabilities. The Japanese version has only players and teams officially licensed from Japan's J. League.

== Gameplay ==
Game options include Friendly, Exhibition, Playoff, Tournament, and League, and play modes include Simulation, Arcade, and Action. There are five control set-ups, Novice, Simple, Semi-Pro, Pro, and Complex. Passes and special moves are automatic on Novice, while there is no help from the computer on Pro and Complex. There are 160 international teams to choose from, such as those representing Argentina and Zambia, as well as teams of leagues local to the United States, France, Germany, England, and Italy. Matches in FIFA Soccer 64 are customizable in terms of time (maximum 90 minutes), weather, clock, display of time, auto replay, and whether fouls, injuries, and offside rule will be in play.

Matches are announced by John Motson, Desmond Lynam, and Andy Gray. Although gameplay is similar to previous FIFA entries, there are a few introductions, including elements to the controls. In addition to being able to perform more tackles, the analog sticks allows players to be flexible with the moving speed (walk, jog, run, sprint), and the length a button is held determines the velocity of a pass or shot. Moves include trapping, rainbow kicks, bicycle kicks, butterfly kicks, tackles, slide tackles, lobs, fakes, and headers. "Passback mode" can also be activated when free kicks and goalie possession occur; the player controls the passer's movements, then commands the ball carrier to either shoot the ball into the net or kick it back to the passer. There are eight camera angles. They can be viewed with the Picture-in-Picture feature (new to the series), where the separate view can be switched between all the angles and a radar display. FIFA Soccer 64 offers the ability to manage a team, such as positions of individual players on a field, as well as choosing from six formations and five strategies.

== Development ==
FIFA Soccer was the Nintendo 64's first soccer simulation, as well as the first title to use Dolby Surround sound. Reports Game Informer, "Nintendo claimed that the N64 would strive to be the unparalleled sports platform." It is similar to the 32-bit versions of FIFA 97 and Japanese counterpart J. League Live 64, and was initially announced under the same title. High numbers of pre-orders for FIFA 64 led Electronic Arts to reverse its recent decision to withdraw from Nintendo 64 software development, instead announcing plans to release several EA Sports games for the Nintendo 64 over the next year.

== Reception ==
Reception

Aggregate score
Aggregator	Score
GameRankings	61%

Review scores
Publication	Score
AllGame	2/5
CNET Gamecenter	8/10
Consoles +	83%
Computer and Video Games	1/5
Edge	5/10
Electronic Gaming Monthly	10.5/20
Game Informer	8.75/10
GameFan	93/100
GamePro	16/20
GameSpot	6.6/10
IGN	4.2/10
N64 Magazine	39%
Next Generation	2/5
Nintendo Power	13.3/20

The game received mixed reviews according to the review aggregation website GameRankings. Electronic Gaming Monthly named FIFA Soccer 64 Most Disappointing Sequel in their 1998 Video Game Buyer's Guide, commenting, "FIFA helped demonstrate the power of the 3DO when EA Sports introduced the world's first 32-Bit soccer game [FIFA International Soccer]. Most gamers hoping for another stunning introduction onto the N64 were let down ..." They cited clumsy-looking animation, weak gameplay, and poor frame rate. Peer Schneider felt it "simply looks rushed", "FIFA Soccer 64 boasts smart AI and a good license, but the game disappoints more than it impresses." Reviews, even positive ones, stated Konami's International Superstar Soccer 64 (1997) was the superior soccer title and recommended gamers to purchase it instead of FIFA Soccer 64, which, argued Next Generation, lacked the Konami title's "playability and realism". Stated Rubenstein, "FIFA Soccer 64 is EA Sports' highly-anticipated foray into the mighty N64 universe. But like EA's initial, stumbling Super Nintendo titles, FIFA Soccer 64 is plagued by confusion, recycled designs, and hampered execution." The most favorable reviewers included Joe Kidd of GameFan, who called FIFA Soccer 64 the best all-time soccer video game, Marc and Panda of Consoles +, who claimed it was the best in the FIFA series, and AllGame's Brad Cook, who stated it "shows why EA Sports is the leader in sports games."

Some critics praised the simulation as realistic, in comparison to similar Nintendo 64 sports games at the time that were arcade-style. The players' names, attire, movements, and artificial intelligence were noted to be accurate, as well as the sound true to that of a real soccer game. Schneider and GamePro journalist Air Hendrix praised the players' animation, the look of the stadium, the crowd sound effects, and the varied, neutral, and on-time audio commentary. Kidd described the graphics as "smooth", also bringing up the "great camera angles" and background sound effects that reflect "a playoff atmosphere" and excite the player. A criticism towards the audio was from Nintendo Power, who found the commentary repetitive. Schneider noted the typos and inaccuracies in the team menus, such as Düsseldorf spelled as "Düsseldrf" in English text but correctly in German text, and Canadian teams falsely listed as US teams. Tim Weaver of N64 Magazine criticized the tackling as unconvincing, "with wayward foot-ins as close as you're going to get to emulating Adams or Southgate". Negative comments were also targeted at the console's blur causing a fuzzy look, Weaver additionally writing that the goal nets sometimes "billow out in the most ludicrous fashion".

Disappointment were expressed towards how little FIFA Soccer 64 took advantage of the Nintendo 64's capabilities. Alex Huhtala of Computer and Video Games noted inferiorities to the PlayStation release of FIFA 97, such as a lower number of teams, the absence of a stadium, and inability to trade players between teams. From the perspective of GameSpot's Glenn Rubenstein, the graphical improvements over other entries were too little for a game on the Nintendo 64. The animations, in particular, were "nowhere near as fluid" as the PlayStation FIFA titles. Tim Weaver of N64 Magazine complained the elements unique from other FIFA games were only "superficial" and towards the options menu, disappointing given the Nintendo 64 having double the power of the PlayStation. The only critic who stated otherwise was CNET Gamecenter's Tom Ham, feeling the improved graphics, controls and A.I. indicated the highest usage of the Nintendo 64's power.

Weaver called the game "infuriatingly slow". Rubenstein argued most of the angles were "imperfect" and caused frame-rate drops. Schneider and Computer and Video Games reviewers Alex Huhtala and Steve Hey also reported jerky animations and frame-rates. Schneider experienced it the most in Picture-in-Picture and scrolling of the angles, and the least when the camera was the most distant from the action (Telecam). He argued that the problem was inexcusable as there was only a flat-textured landscape and players to render; Blast Corps (1997), by comparison, had several more elements going on at a time, and ran far better. Although Consoles + claimed the players were animated very lively, they criticized the ball animation as jerky.

Of frequent note was the huge number of options, Nintendo Power claiming FIFA Soccer 64 "has a little bit of everything and more variety than any other soccer game". The magazine's staff particularly found the ability to switch between camera angles "innovative". A frequently highlighted mode was the four-player. However, Electronic Gaming Monthly's Kraig Kujawa and Dean Hager disliked FIFA Soccer 64 for focusing more on having several options and less on the actual gameplay. Kujawa called features such as Picture-in-Picture a good novelty, but "useless". Computer and Video Games criticized Picture-in-Picture for slowing down the frame rate even more, adding that the separate view obscured a chunk of the main action, yet its frame was so small it was hard to see. Hendrix wrote that it still may disappoint gamers with its limited new features for the FIFA series (he felt there should have been more moves, custom players, and indoor-stadium options) and lack of "pizzazz and originality" Wave Race 64 had. Weaver criticized the tactics screen for being of little help, and the Picture-in-Picture feature for having the separate view so large it was difficult to focus on the main action.

The controls were criticized as "unwieldy", "fiddly", "slow and unresponsive", "imprecise and confusing", "loose at best" and "sluggish". Kujawa attributed the problem to the poor animation of the otherwise nice-looking characters. Weaver noted their inconsistencies, meaning the buttons did not always execute the same results; an example was the two-second delay of the ball-shoot button: "As a result, you panic and try another button in the hope of producing something resembling a shot only to see your player sky one into the stand." Schneider also reported a delay on the button to switch players; he suggested a sound effect should have been played to indicate whether a player switch worked, as there was in Wayne Gretzky's 3D Hockey (1996). He also considered it weird that the characters could not be moved in analog, despite the game supporting the analog stick. Huhtala described executing passes as more based on luck than skill, "with players having the crazy habit of back heeling rather than going forward". The unnatural physics of the ball, such as abrupt de-accelerations, were also called out. Hendrix was one of few critics to report the passing and shooting working successfully, although stated the player switch mechanic kept "you out of the play".
