= Lego Island =

1997 video game

- Cover art featuring the Brickster (left, on motorcycle) and Pepper Roni (right, on skateboard)
- Developer: Mindscape
- Publisher: Mindscape
- Director: Wes Jenkins
- Producer: Scott Anderson
- Designers: Dennis Goodrow; Wes Jenkins
- Programmers: Dennis Goodrow (manager); Jim Brown; Randy Chou (3D); Alex Goldobin; Eric Ellis
- Artists: David Patch; Jan Sleeper
- Writer: Wes Jenkins
- Composer: Lorin Nelson
- Platform: Windows
- Release: September 26, 1997
- Genre: Action-adventure
- Mode: Single-player

Lego Island is a Lego-themed open world action-adventure game developed and published by Mindscape. It was released for Windows on September 26, 1997, as the second Lego video game overall and the first one outside Japan. In the "proto-open world" game, players explore the eponymous island as one of five unique minifigure characters, and can build vehicles and complete side quests; the game's main story involves Pepper Roni, a pizza delivery boy, and his efforts to stop an escaped prisoner known as the Brickster from destroying the island.

Lego Island was the first video game developed after the Lego Group began efforts to gain a foothold in the video game industry. The game's main characters are each modeled after an intelligence type according to the theory of multiple intelligences. The development team studied how children engaged with Lego bricks to help shape the game's scope and gameplay.

Lego Island received generally positive reviews from critics. It was a commercial success, selling close to one million copies by 1999. The game was followed by two sequels, both developed by Silicon Dreams Studio: Lego Island 2: The Brickster's Revenge (2001) and Island Xtreme Stunts (2002). It has since gained a cult following, with a fan-made sequel in development as of 2020, and unofficial ports developed through decompilation released in 2025.

== Gameplay ==
Lego Island as it appears in the game, including the Information Center (top-left) and the Brickster's jail cell (top-right)

Lego Island is a nonlinear video game played from a first-person perspective. The player is able to freely roam around the eponymous Lego Island, interact with non-player characters, build and drive vehicles, or complete several different missions.

The game features five playable characters: police officers Laura and Nick Brick; pizzeria proprietors Mama and Papa Brickolini; and their adopted son Pepper Roni, a pizza delivery boy who serves as the protagonist. Each playable character possesses their own unique abilities and interactions modeled after different intelligence types listed in Howard Gardner's theory of multiple intelligences; the game showcases two additional intelligence types via non-player characters the Infomaniac, the island's founder who serves as a tour guide, and the Brickster, a criminal incarcerated in Lego Island's jail. Each character can perform a different action to customize non-player characters and vegetation on the island, such as changing their colors or giving them different hats. The game also includes numerous Easter eggs spread across the island. The player can also construct a race car, jet ski, dune buggy, or police helicopter with the help of mechanic Bill Ding, which can be customized and used in missions or to explore the island. There are five missions that the player can perform as any of the playable characters: a motor race at the race track; a jet ski race at the beach; a pizza delivery for Brickolini's Pizzeria; a towing job for the Octan gas station; and ambulance driving for the hospital. The player will be awarded a red, blue, or yellow brick per character for each mission depending on how they place in the race or how quickly they complete the mission, which can be viewed on the Score Cube at the Information Center.

While there is no running story or necessary objective to Lego Island, a special mission will occur if the player has built a police helicopter and delivers a pizza to the Jail as Pepper Roni. Using the fumes from the extremely spicy pizza, the Brickster melts the lock to his cell and escapes in the helicopter, stealing the power brick from the top of the Information Center. He then disassembles the helicopter and steals vehicles from the hospital and police station, planning to disassemble everything on the island with a laser gun powered by the stolen power brick. Giving chase on his skateboard, Pepper pursues the Brickster and recovers the pieces of the helicopter. Once it is rebuilt, Pepper uses the helicopter to fire donuts to speed Nick and Laura up and pizzas to slow the Brickster down, allowing him to be captured. The Brickster is thrown back in jail, and the citizens congratulate Pepper and the player. If the Brickster is not caught before he disassembles all the buildings, an alternate ending occurs in which the Brickster gloats about his success as the citizens break down crying, though the Infomaniac reassures the player that they can rebuild the island and the Brickster will be returned to his cell.

== Development and release ==
The development team created a model of Lego Island to study how children engaged with it. From left to right: Scott Anderson, Wes Jenkins, and Dennis Goodrow.

Lego Island was developed by Mindscape, a developer of edutainment software based in Novato, California. The head of one of the company's departments was looking for a partner company in the toy industry and, after some research, settled for the Lego Group, the producer of the Lego line of toys. Mindscape subsequently hired Wes Jenkins, who, in turn, brought on Paul Melmed. Jenkins and Melmed drafted a game concept based on the "Town" theme of Lego sets. Both attended the Toy Fair in New York City in February 1995, pitching the concept to the Lego Group.

Around the same time, toy manufacturers such as the Lego Group were trying to explore or gain a foothold in the growing video game industry. The only previous Lego-branded video game was Lego Fun to Build, which was released by Sega in December 1995 for the Japanese Sega Pico market. The Lego Group had established the Futura research and development group in Boston, which was looking at possible intersections between Lego products and digital media, including video games and virtual reality experiences. In 1995, the Lego Group employee Tormod Askildsen was tasked with exploring the company's potential venture into the video game market. He hired a handful of people and prepared a report, titled "Elvis", which he presented during a workshop on December 21, 1995. The report stated that the Lego Group's entrance into the video game market was a necessity, rather than an option. Mindscape and the Lego Group jointly announced their collaboration for a Lego-branded personal computer game on January 27, 1996, then targeting to release the game in the fourth quarter of that year. The game was given a budget of US$2 million.

Jenkins headed the project as its creative director, while Melmed acted as the education and research director. Other leads included senior producer Scott Anderson, director of development Dennis Goodrow, project manager Mari Collings, and the lead 3D artist Dave Patch. The lead programmer, Jim Brown, was hired at Anderson's request. Randy Chou was hired to make 3D performant and functional. The engineering team was made up of five people. The rest of development team eventually grew to more than 100 people, mostly artists, which allowed for the inclusion of multiple playable characters. As proposed by Melmed, who had a background in psychology, each of these characters would represent a different form of intelligence as described by Howard Gardner's theory of multiple intelligences. The game featured full voice acting for all its characters, with cast members including John Morris as Pepper, June Foray as Mama, Ralph Peduto as Papa, David Lander as the Brickster, and Jenkins voicing several minor roles.

The development team created a bespoke game engine for Lego Island, which was intended to be reused in potential sequels. The DirectX technology set was used to render 3D environments. According to Brown, graphics accelerators were in their infancy, so Lego Island was designed to work on computers that did not have one, while simultaneously being able to take advantage of an accelerator if one was available. Jenkins, his wife Kyle Bogertman, and Anderson created a real-world model of the game's island, and the development team invited children to play with the set, observing how these children would interact with the various elements. According to Anderson, girls tended to decorate the island, such as with trees, while boys were more interested in racing elements. Subsequently, more of the game's elements, including the sky and trees, were made customizable with the goal of incentivizing girls to play the game. In so-called "Yes meetings", team members could present any further ideas they had to the rest of the team. If another member agreed, the proposer would sleep over it and, on the next day, try to frame a realistic implementation of the feature.

During 1996, the Lego Group established Lego Media as its video game division based in London, invested US$2 million in the development of Lego-themed video games, and created Darwin, a "Strategic Product Unit" that absorbed most of Futura. Mindscape regularly communicated with Lego Media and Darwin, which led to the inclusion of further buildings and vehicles in the game, as well as the exclusion of non-Lego elements like ropes. In January 1997, Mindscape and the Lego Group reintroduced the game, now titled Adventures on Lego Island and scheduled for a release in the third quarter of 1997. As Lego Island, the game was released worldwide on September 26, 1997; copies of the game included a comic book that acted as the game's instruction manual, as well as a Lego minifigure of the Infomaniac. One day prior to the release, Mindscape fired the entirety of Lego Island's development team. The company had a program for bonuses in place, so several of the affected employees believed that Mindscape laid them off solely to avoid paying royalties.

== Reception ==
In a contemporary retrospective of Lego Creator: Harry Potter, another Lego-based edutainment game, Kotaku's Zack Zwiezen noted that edutainment titles in general (including Lego Island) were rarely reviewed by video game critics upon release due to the young target demographic. Despite that, the game received mainly positive reception among critics from newspapers; Gary Duchane of the Hartford Courant praised the game's graphics and animations while appreciating the multiple player characters and side quests. The Windsor Star's Paul Dame was dismayed with the restricted building options in the game, though he recommended it to "children who love Lego." Writing for Tribune Media Services, Pam Gleichman commented that the game was widely acclaimed by boys while receiving more mixed reception among girls after they tested it out. Minor criticism was leveled at the game's system requirements; Aaron Curtiss of the Los Angeles Times complained that the game was "an absolute resource hog, pushing most home desktops to the limit—even in low-resolution mode." Duchane concurred, noting that he attempted to load the game on computers with Pentium processors clocked at 90, 133, and 200 MHz, and found that the game "only ran happily on the 200."

Lego Island won the award for "PC Family/Kids Entertainment Title of the Year" during the inaugural Interactive Achievement Awards. In 2016, Sam Loveridge of Digital Spy ranked Lego Island as the 14th best Lego game in a list of 15.

In the United States, Lego Island sold over 909,000 copies between 1997 and 1999, making it the 15th-best-selling computer game of that period. It was the country's 11th-best-selling computer game in 1997, with 323,085 units sold and almost $12 million earned in revenue. It reached eighth place on the United States' chart for the January–November 1998 period. It ultimately placed seventh for the full year of 1998, with 404,858 sales. Its revenue that year alone was over $10.2 million. The following year, it dropped to the 15th position on the annual sales charts, with 309,698 units sold. The success of Lego Island revived Mindscape's business, which was in trouble at the time. The company's total sales rose by 70% in 1997, driven primarily by Lego Island.

== Legacy ==
In partnering with the Lego Group, Mindscape had gained the rights to produce multiple Lego-branded games. Prior to the Lego Island developers' dismissal, they had been conceptualizing and prototyping a follow-up to the game, titled Beneath the Lego Phanta Sea. This follow-up would have explored the "importance of ecology and environmentalism from an educational perspective". However, after the release of Lego Island, the Lego Group terminated Mindscape's license for future Lego-based games. Silicon Dreams Studio eventually developed two sequels: Lego Island 2: The Brickster's Revenge (2001) and Island Xtreme Stunts (2002). During the development of The Brickster's Revenge, the studio was aware of the original Lego Island and Beneath the Lego Phanta Sea but decided to build a new concept from scratch. Island Xtreme Stunts became the final entry in the Lego Island series.

Lego Island has inspired a number of preservationists and other enthusiasts. Among other things, fans of the game have distributed archives of old production material obtained from the developers, produced documentaries and podcasts, and developed unofficial patches to allow the game to run on newer computers. A fan-made sequel, Project Island, was initiated as a solo project by Floris Thoonen in the mid-2010s. The game was formally announced around Lego Island's twentieth anniversary in 2017. As of 2020, around 50 people are working on Project Island with varying degrees of activity, with all of them contributing during their spare time. The project team irregularly publishes update videos and intends to release a demo entitled Port Pizza, featuring a small island with a limited scope.

On July 11, 2023, YouTuber Matthew "MattKC" Wong announced that he had started decompiling Lego Island. The project was hosted on GitHub, allowing virtual volunteering. In December 2024, the project was considered 100% complete with only minor accuracy issues. A fork was later created, aiming to alter the code to make porting to other systems easier. Following the project's completion, Wong was connected with a Lego Group employee and helped them locate additional Lego Island development material for their archives. This led to the rediscovery of the original source code, though the Lego Group does not intend to publicly release it. In June 2025, the first decompilation-based port was launched, allowing users to play the game in a web browser.

== Bibliography ==
- LEGO Island: A Totally Wacky But Very Helpful Instruction Manual (instruction manual). Lego Media. 1997.
