= Island Xtreme Stunts =

2002 video game

- Developer: Silicon Dreams Studio
- Publishers: Electronic Arts; Lego Interactive
- Platforms: Game Boy Advance; Windows; PlayStation 2
- Release: PlayStation 2: NA: November 27, 2002; EU: December 6, 2002; Game Boy Advance: NA: November 27, 2002; Windows: NA: December 3, 2002; EU: December 6, 2002
- Genre: Action-adventure
- Mode: Single-player

Island Xtreme Stunts is an action-adventure video game, and the sequel to Lego Island 2: The Brickster's Revenge, making it the third and final game in the Lego Island series, despite dropping the original Lego Island title and logo from the name. Like Lego Island 2, the game was developed by Silicon Dreams Studio. It was co-published by Electronic Arts and Lego Interactive, and was released in 2002, for the PlayStation 2 and Microsoft Windows, with a spin-off also released for Game Boy Advance.

== Plot ==
Pepper Roni has been cast as the lead in an action movie being filmed on Lego Island (appropriately titled "Xtreme Stunts") and the Brickster (who had somehow made it back to Lego Island) has been released from jail after he claimed to have reformed and is now playing a part of the film. After performing a motorbike jump through a large poster as a publicity stunt, he is then taken to the first scene where he performs a high-speed freeway car chase after the Brickster, who has been ironically cast as the main villain of the film. Upon completion, Pepper is given free roam of Lego Island, allowing him to explore and complete side missions as he continues the film in other locations throughout the island. As the player makes more progress in missions, it becomes more and more apparent that the Brickster has plans of his own, and later he kidnaps the Infomaniac and reveals his tower that his Brickster-Bots have built and has made a supercomputer that will disassemble the entire world. Pepper naturally comes to the rescue while the host tries to shut down the supercomputer. He once again outwits and imprisons the Brickster while the supercomputer was instead reprogrammed to disassemble the tower, allowing the film to be completed and released on schedule (which the player is able to view upon completion of the game). In the end, Pepper has access to all areas of the island, allowing him to redo scenes of the movie and different tasks.

=== Characters ===
The majority of the original Lego Island and Lego Island 2 cast return. Pepper Roni remains the star of the game, while his adoptive parents Mama and Papa Brickolini continue their career running a pizzeria. The Infomaniac's role has been reduced from the player's guide to a simple cameo. Others retain their roles, such as Ed Mail the postman, Nick and Laura Brick the police officers, Mrs. Post the grocer, and others. The studio director is introduced, serving as a guide for the player through the stunts and giving him various objectives throughout the game itself.

Unlike Lego Island and Lego Island 2, Pepper does not speak any dialogue in the game aside from grunts and one-word exclamations, making him a silent protagonist. When doing stunt work, however, he can make comments that are more than one word.

== Gameplay ==
Like Lego Island 2, the player controls Pepper throughout the game, exploring the island in a non-linear style. Players are able to control and ride various vehicles throughout the city (only once they have obtained their correct licences). There are various collectible items scattered throughout that will rebuild animals composed of large Lego pieces, and there are also minigames in some parts of the city, such as helping one of the grocery store owners arrange and organize crates for storage.

When filming stunts, the player is briefed by the director on how to perform the stunts within the scene, followed by a "practice room" where Pepper can practice controlling the vehicle used in front of a bluescreen (as various Brickster Bots control the mechanics for him). The player is then taken to "perform" the scene by playing the minigame within it. Upon its completion, players are taken to the screening room to see a "take" of the scene, which includes some humorous and unintentional event taking place behind the scenes (different difficulties play different takes). Players are then graded on their performance, based on how quickly objectives were completed and how many bonus stunts were performed.

== Sets ==
From 2002 to 2003, an official Island Xtreme Stunts series of Lego sets was released. The line featured replications of the characters to semi-canonical sets such as skateboard parks and various vehicles used in the game. However, these did not financially impact the success of either the game or the Lego series itself, and the theme was discontinued after the first year. The sets are now collector's items.

== Reception ==
Reception

Aggregate score
Aggregator	Score
Metacritic	(PC) 71/100 (PS2) 63/100

The PC version holds a 71/100 at Metacritic and the PS2 version holds a 63/100. PlayStation: The Official Magazine gave the game a 70 and stated on a positive note that "there's surprising depth and lots to do for a younger crowd. It's perfect for an under-13 gamer", whereas IGN says there are much better titles for children.
