= Olympic Soccer =

1996 video game

- Saturn cover art (Europe)
- Developer: Silicon Dreams
- Publisher: Eidos Interactive; Panasonic; U.S. Gold: JP: Coconuts Japan Entertainment
- Platforms: 3DO, MS-DOS, PlayStation, Sega Saturn
- Release: NA: August 6, 1996; EU: August 1996; JP: August 30, 1996
- Genre: Sports
- Modes: Single-player, multiplayer

Olympic Soccer is a 1996 association football video game developed by Silicon Dreams and published by U.S. Gold, released for the PlayStation, 3DO Interactive Multiplayer, Sega Saturn, and MS-DOS compatible operating systems. A Panasonic M2 version was never completed because of the system's cancellation.

== Gameplay ==
Olympic Soccer is a soccer game that offers expanded control aspects for the players and enables many special maneuvers.

== Development ==
Olympic Soccer was developed by Silicon Dreams, with Mark Walden and Rob Palfreeman serving as producers. The development team included programmers Giles Park, Andrew Hersee and Rodney Mack, while Andy McLernan was responsible for the Sega Saturn version.

The developers used motion capture to record certain player movements, although other animations were created manually. Producer Mark Walden explained that motion capture was not suitable for every action, particularly when movements required exaggeration or precise responses to player commands. The game also featured adjustable camera angles and a range of passing, shooting and tactical options.

The audio was produced under Max Little, who recorded football chants and other crowd sounds to recreate the atmosphere of a match. British football commentator Alan Green provided commentary for the game.

== Playable teams ==
32 national football teams are playable in the game. These are:

- Argentina
- Australia
- Austria
- Belgium
- Brazil
- China
- Czech Republic
- Denmark
- England
- Finland
- France
- Germany
- Greece
- Hungary
- Republic of Ireland
- Israel
- Italy
- Japan
- Netherlands
- Northern Ireland
- Norway
- Poland
- Portugal
- Romania
- Russia
- Saudi Arabia
- Scotland
- Spain
- Sweden
- Switzerland
- United States
- Wales

== Reception ==
Next Generation reviewed the PlayStation version of the game, rating it three stars out of five, and stated that "if general entertainment ranks above true realism in your criteria for soccer games, Olympic Soccer will fit the bill precisely."

Next Generation reviewed the 3DO version of the game, rating it three stars out of five, and stated that "It still can't compete with FIFA, especially given they're both available for 3DO, but for a fast-paced, exciting one- or two-player game, the 3DO doesn't have many games of this caliber."

Contemporary European reviews of the Sega Saturn version were generally positive. Sega Saturn Magazine awarded the game 85%, praising its range of options, player moves and playability, and describing its game engine as impressive, although it considered the graphics technically unremarkable and the commentary repetitive. The magazine felt that Olympic Soccer faced particularly strong competition from games such as UEFA Euro 96 England and Power Soccer. French magazine Mega Force scored it 89%, praising its accessible gameplay, range of options and strategic variety while noting imperfections in its artificial intelligence and presentation. Germany's Sega Magazin gave the game 78%, praising its action-oriented gameplay, tricks, combinations, replay system and German commentary, while criticizing its relatively sparse and jerky graphics. Reviewer Hans Ippisch concluded that its gameplay was strong enough to compete with FIFA Soccer 96 and Striker '96.

== Reviews ==
- Electronic Gaming Monthly (Jul, 1996)
- Mean Machines - Aug, 1996
- IGN - Nov 25, 1996
- PC Games - Nov, 1996
