= Chill (video game) =

1998 video game

- Developer: Silicon Dreams Studio
- Publisher: Eidos Interactive
- Platform: PlayStation
- Release: EU: April 1998
- Genre: Snowboarding
- Modes: Single-player, multiplayer

Chill is a PlayStation snowboarding video game published by Eidos Interactive in 1998 and developed by Silicon Dreams Studio.

== Gameplay ==
The game features five tracks spread over five mountains, and features a two-player multiplayer mode that can be played in either vertical or horizontal split-screen mode. There are multiple routes down each mountain.

== Development ==
The game's existence was first mentioned in November 1996. The title was endorsed by Burton Boards of America and was showcased at E3 1997.

Eidos stated in early 1998 that they had decided against publishing the game for the PlayStation, but they nonetheless released it a few months later. A Sega Saturn version of the game was slated to be published by developer Silicon Dreams themselves, and was completed in time for its planned release date of April 1998, but in the end it was left unreleased.

== Reception ==
Reception

Review scores
Publication	Score
Power Unlimited	70%
The Sydney Morning Herald	8.5/10
Cambridge Evening News	3/5

Cambridge Evening News gave the game a score of 3 out of 5, stating, "But overall the game is slightly dull and predictable. Chill will draw a cool response from snowboarding fans."

Reviewing the Saturn version before its release was cancelled, Sega Saturn Magazine gave it a score of 80% but compared it unfavorably to its contemporary Steep Slope Sliders, citing inferior graphics and dull gameplay.
