= Lego Island 2: The Brickster's Revenge =

2001 video game

- Developers: Silicon Dreams Studio; Crawfish Interactive (GBC)
- Publisher: Lego Software
- Composers: Richard Wells, David Pushon
- Platforms: Microsoft Windows, PlayStation, Game Boy Color, Game Boy Advance
- Release: Game Boy Color: NA: 22 March 2001; PlayStation: NA: 27 March 2001; Microsoft Windows: NA: 30 March 2001; Game Boy Advance: NA: 2 October 2001
- Genre: Action-adventure
- Mode: Single-player

Lego Island 2: The Brickster's Revenge is a 2001 action-adventure video game developed by Silicon Dreams Studio and published by Lego Software. It is the sequel to Lego Island and was followed by Island Xtreme Stunts.

== Plot ==
The game starts similarly to the original Lego Island with Pepper once again being sent to deliver a pizza to the Brickster at the jail. Upon heading to the jail however, Pepper watches the Brickster take peppers from previous pizzas, so he can eat them all at once and melt the jail bars with his fiery breath.

The Brickster escapes, and steals the police helicopter, along with the Constructopedia, the book with all instructions to the buildings on LEGO Island. With each page he tears from the book, a building becomes deconstructed. Pepper must travel three different worlds to collect all the pages and rebuild Lego Island. The Brickster releases "Brickster Bots," which Pepper uses pizzas to destroy. After finding four pages on the Island, Pepper must defeat some Brickster Bots in the Information Center and then travel to Castle Island by boat.

On Castle Island, Pepper must rebuild the bridge between the Lions and the Bulls. So, Pepper dives down the river and avoids obstacles such as sharks, firing cannons, and skeleton pirates. He rebuilds the bridges and collects a Constructopedia page. After that, Pepper must joust the Dark Knight in order to get the Bulls' flag from the Lions. Next, the stubborn Bull leader, Cedric the Bull, is adamant about not giving Pepper the page. Upon his defeat, Cedric surrenders the page and Pepper goes back to LEGO Island

Several more pages are found on LEGO Island after returning. Pepper collects a boombox used to defeat the Brickster Bots, as pizzas no longer hurt them. Shortly thereafter, Pepper is told he must go to Adventurers' Island via helicopter. He lands in the desert and meets classic LEGO characters Johnny Thunder and Pippin Reed. On their way to the Sphinx, Pepper must prevent snakes from stealing the Adventurers' gems.

At the Sphinx, they meet Dr. Kilroy, who agrees to let Pepper use his Speedster to get to the Oasis. Pepper must open sarcophagi to match symbols and open the gate to obtain a page, which triggers a boulder that rolls towards Pepper and the exit. Pepper then gets into Dr. Kilroy's Speedster and avoids rocks, trees, cows, tornadoes, and UFOs on the way to the Oasis.

At the Oasis, Pepper fishes for a fish called Big Bertha, who swallowed one of the pages.

At the airfield, Dr. Kilroy has succumbed to heat exposure. Pepper must fly the biplane to the jungle, while the three Adventurers fly in the seaplane.

In the jungle, Pepper rides a T-Rex to the infamous Mr. Hates' camp, because he has a page. Pepper frees all of Mr. Hates' dinosaurs that he has captured and retrieves a page. The Adventurers Island part of the game is complete, and all of the pages have been returned to the Island.

Upon returning to Lego Island, Pepper begins training to go into Space, as reports indicate the Brickster has settled on Planet Ogel – "Lego" spelled backwards. Pepper trains for centrifugal force and parachute emergency. During space travel, Pepper dodges asteroids and finds that the Brickster has stolen the landing gear. He must jump out of the shuttle and parachute onto Ogel Island.

On Ogel, Pepper makes pizzas with Mama and Papa Brickolini, whom the Brickster has taken captive. The pizzas put the citizens of Ogel to sleep so Pepper can face the Brickster. He climbs the tower, avoiding moving platforms and gaps. At the top of his tower, Pepper must throw spicy pizzas at the Brickster whilst dodging Brickster Bots. When the Brickster eats three pizzas, he goes to the bathroom and locks himself in, effectively jailing him again. Pepper and the Brickolinis return to Lego Island to celebrate.

=== Side quests ===
While the game is mostly made up of mini-games, the player can explore each Island in-depth to retrieve trinkets scattered around the map to boost their score. Castle Island has chalices, Adventurers Island has red gems, and Ogel Island has yellow crystals.

== Development ==
The day before Lego Island's release, the entire development team was laid off. Shortly after, Mindscape lost the LEGO license.

Around 1998, The Lego Group and Vision Scape Interactive began work on an animated series called Adventures in LEGO World with Krisalis Software developing a tie-in video game for the show called Lego Fantasy. Upon the shows cancellation, Krisalis decided to rework their early prototype into a sequel to Lego Island. For unknown reasons, Krisalis was eventually replaced with Silicon Dreams Studio, with the game restarting development around 1999.

== Reception ==
Reception

Aggregate score
Aggregator	Score
GameRankings	(GBA) 75% (PS1) 64.67% (GBC) 56.67% (PC) 55%

Review score
Publication	Score
IGN	(GBC) 5/10

Lego Island 2: The Brickster's Revenge received mixed reviews. IGN gave the Game Boy Color version a score of 5 out of 10, calling it "mediocre" and "strictly average."

== Sequel ==
In 2002, Lego Interactive and Electronic Arts released Island Xtreme Stunts for Microsoft Windows, PlayStation 2, and Game Boy Advance, with Silicon Dreams Studio returning as the developer. The game was a tie-in to a Lego theme of the same name, which lasted only a year.
