= Dogs of War (2000 video game) =

Science fiction real-time strategy game

- North American box art
- Developer: Silicon Dreams Studio
- Publishers: TalonSoft (PC); Take-Two Interactive (DC; cancelled)
- Platform: Windows
- Release: EU: April 14, 2000; UK: May 6, 2000; NA: July 31, 2000
- Genre: Sci-fi Real-time strategy
- Modes: Single-player, multiplayer

Dogs of War is a science fiction real-time strategy game developed by Silicon Dreams Studio and published by TalonSoft.

The game is particular in that it does not simply provide a top-down view to command one's army, but also allows the player to control units individually in third-person view.

== Plot ==
Around 2200, the Empire on Earth sends colonists to space to seek resources for the now-depleted Earth. The first settlement is on Primus IV. Its colonists are applauded and praised for their bravery. The Empire then sets up colonies all over the galaxy. Suddenly, Primus IV is attacked by a reptilian race known only as the Mantai. Much of the colonist population is killed, but the Empire sends no help. The Empire forgets about Primus IV, as does the rest of the universe. After the colonists manage to fight off the Mantai to less inhabitable parts of the world, they begin to rebuild. Soon after, they discover a material known as SL-18. It is proven to be the perfect material to use in armor and metals: stronger than any other known material.

Once the Empire back on Earth hears about this, they are eager to trade with the colonists. The colonists themselves are not so willing. They trade SL-18 with anyone who'll pay for it, but the Empire sees this open trade as a danger to the SL-18 supply for Earth and its colonies. Earth sets up an outpost on Primus IV to make sure that they have sole control of the SL-18 supply.

Using the funds they obtain in selling SL-18, the colonists hire an experienced mercenary force, known as the WarMonkeys. They use these forces to retake Primus IV. The Empire is infuriated, and sends its own armies to reclaim the planet. Thus the war between the WarMonkeys and Imperial Forces begins.

== Reception ==
Reception

Aggregate score
Aggregator	Score
Metacritic	61/100

Review scores
Publication	Score
Computer Gaming World	1/5
Edge	7/10
Eurogamer	5/10
GamePro	4/5
GameSpot	5.4/10
GameSpy	55%
GameZone	7/10
IGN	7/10
PC Gamer (US)	55%
PC Zone	47%

The game received "mixed" reviews according to the review aggregation website Metacritic.
