= Football Mania =

2002 video game

- North American cover art
- Developers: Silicon Dreams Studio; Tiertex Design Studios (GBA)
- Publishers: Electronic Arts; Lego Interactive
- Platforms: PlayStation 2 Microsoft Windows; Game Boy Advance
- Release: NA: 18 June 2002; EU: 21 June 2002 (GBA); EU: 5 July 2002 (PC); EU: 2 August 2002 (PS2)
- Genre: Sports video game
- Modes: Single-player, multiplayer

Football Mania (known as Soccer Mania outside Europe) is a Lego-themed sports game released in 2002 for the PlayStation 2, Microsoft Windows and Game Boy Advance. It was developed by Silicon Dreams and published by Electronic Arts and Lego Interactive, and was the first Lego game to be co-published by Electronic Arts, as well as the first to lack the "Lego" branding in the name.

The game features a simplified version of association football, with six players per side and no offsides, throw-ins, or fouls. There are many different maps for the game all with music and sounds. Teams and stadia within the game are based upon existing Lego themes. Power-ups, such as speed boosts and shields, spawn randomly on the pitch during play. The game features a number of modes, such as quick match, exhibition, a knock-out tournament, and training, which doubles as a series of minigames. In Lego Cup mode, the World Cup is played and there are 32 national teams to choose from.

== Reception ==
Reception

Aggregate scores
Aggregator	Score		
Aggregator	GBA	PC	PS2
GameRankings	49%	51%	58%
Metacritic	N/A	N/A	61/100

Review scores
Publication	Score		
Publication	GBA	PC	PS2
AllGame	N/A	3/5	N/A
Game Informer	N/A	N/A	7/10
GamesMaster	12%	N/A	45%
GameSpot	N/A	4.6/10	5.9/10
GameSpy	N/A	N/A	3/5
GameZone	7.3/10	7/10	5.8/10
IGN	N/A	N/A	5.5/10
Nintendo Power	3.5/5	N/A	N/A
PlayStation Official Magazine – UK	N/A	N/A	5/10
Official U.S. PlayStation Magazine	N/A	N/A	3.5/5

The PlayStation 2 version received "mixed" reviews according to the review aggregation website Metacritic.

== See also ==
- Lego Sports
- Lego Pirates
- List of Lego video games
- FIFA (video game series)
- EA Sports FC
