= FIFA Soccer 96 =

1995 video game

- North American Saturn cover art featuring Notts County's Andy Legg and Brescia Calcio's Ioan Sabău
- Developer: Extended Play Productions (Note: SNES, Game Boy, Game Gear, 32X and Saturn versions developed by Probe Entertainment.)
- Publishers: EA Sports; Game Boy, Game Gear; Black Pearl Software
- Composers: Robert Bailey; Graeme Coleman
- Series: FIFA
- Engine: Virtual Stadium
- Platforms: Mega Drive/Genesis, Super NES, PlayStation, Game Boy, Sega Saturn, 32X, Game Gear, MS-DOS
- Release: 10 November 1995: Mega Drive/Genesis, Super NES; EU: 10 November 1995; NA: November 1995 PlayStation; NA: 22 November 1995; EU: 1995 32X; EU: November 1995 Game Boy; NA: December 1995; EU: 1996 Saturn; NA/EU: December 1995 MS-DOS; NA: 1995 Game Gear; NA: 1995; EU: 1995
- Genre: Sports (association football)
- Modes: Single-player, multiplayer

FIFA Soccer 96 (also known as FIFA 96: Virtual Soccer Stadium) is a 1995 football video game developed by Extended Play Productions and released by EA Sports for the Mega Drive/Genesis, Sega Saturn, 32X, Game Gear, PlayStation, Super Nintendo Entertainment System, and MS-DOS-compatible operating systems. It is the third entry in the FIFA series, its tagline being "Next Generation Soccer". It was the first in the series to feature real-time 3D graphics on the Saturn, PlayStation, 32X, and DOS versions, using technology called "Virtual Stadium". The SNES and Mega Drive/Genesis editions used the FIFA 95 engine. It is also the first in the series to use real player names and positions, with ranking, transfer and team customisation tools.

== Development ==
The game's budget was $3 million. FIFA 96 was the first game in the series to use the Virtual Stadium game engine.

The 32X version was released exclusively in PAL territories, making it one of only two 32X games, alongside Darxide, to receive a PAL release without a corresponding North American version.

== Reception ==
Reception

Review scores
Publication	Score
Electronic Gaming Monthly	8/10 (SAT)
Next Generation	4/5 (GEN, SNES, WIN, PS1); 5/5 (SAT)
Play	81%
Maximum	4/5 (PS1); 3/5 (SAT)
Computer Game Review	96/96/96
Sega Saturn Magazine	80% (SAT)

The game was a bestseller in the UK. Computer Game Review gave the MS-DOS a "Platinum Triad" score and called it "the best soccer game, if not the best sports game available, bar none."

Reviewing the PlayStation version, Maximum applauded the game for the realism in the player controls and AI behavior, as well as the large number of features, such as the multiple camera angles and league play. They summarized "The remarkably user-friendly options ensure that even the most demanding players will be satisfied, and once the game begins properly, you will appreciate the time and honing skill that has been lavished upon this product by the truly professional EA Sports coders." Tommy Glide of GamePro hailed the game for its realism as well, saying it managed to surpass even the 3DO version of FIFA International Soccer. He praised the use of more than 3,000 real players, the realistic passing controls, and the audio commentary. In a retrospective review roughly a year after the game's release, a Next Generation critic commented that "One of the deepest, most beautiful, and eminently playable sports games hasn't lost a thing since its release".

Rob Allsetter of Sega Saturn Magazine applauded the comprehensive selection of players, customizing options, and camera angles, but complained that the animation is "both slow and slightly jittery." He concluded, "Fifa '96 makes a brave attempt to capture the real thrill of football. At the end of it all though, it lacks the smoothness and speed to merit championship distinction." The two sports reviewers of Electronic Gaming Monthly both gave the Saturn version an 8 out of 10, particularly praising the multiple camera angles and the play-by-play commentary, both of which they felt made the game very lifelike. GamePro too praised the camera angles, but put greater emphasis on the deep gameplay. Comparing it to the PlayStation version, they remarked that the Saturn version has more vibrant colors and larger sprites, but rougher characters and less smooth scrolling. Maximum highly criticized it as having a lower frame rate than the PlayStation version, adding that other Saturn ports of soccer games all were very close to the originals. Despite this, they declared FIFA 96 "the dominant soccer in the Saturn market" due to the advanced gameplay mechanics and the weakness of the competition. A Next Generation critic was wildly enthusiastic about the game's accurate recreation of real professional soccer, particularly remarking that it is possible to identify individual players on the field just by looking at them, and that executing game plans produces realistic results. He added that even with all the devotion to realism, the game is also tremendously fun, and concluded to be one of the best games for the Saturn.

Reception of the Saturn version in continental Europe was generally positive. French magazine Consoles + awarded it 80%, noting its similarity to the PlayStation version and praising its fluid, realistic player movement, sound and range of options. In Spain, Hobby Consolas praised the Saturn version's technical presentation, digitized players and extensive commentary system, describing it as one of the best football games the magazine had seen. German magazine MAN!AC awarded both the Saturn and PlayStation versions 84%, praising the game's extensive tactical options, controls and presentation, while criticizing the sometimes difficult-to-understand English commentary. In Germany, the Saturn version debuted at number one on Karstadt's Saturn sales chart in December 1995 and retained the position in January 1996. It remained in the retailer's monthly top ten through July 1996.

Reviewing the Genesis version, a Next Generation critic judged that the game continued the FIFA tradition of improving with each installment, particularly praising the inclusion of real soccer leagues and players. He concluded, "While the Genesis version can't hold a candle to the near-perfect 3DO version [of FIFA International Soccer], it's still the best 16-bit soccer available and a great game beyond that." Next Generation's reviews of the DOS and Super NES versions were similarly laudatory, casting praise at the animations, commentary, maneuvers, real world teams, choice of camera angles, and simple play control. GamePro's The Athletic Supporter was also highly pleased with the Genesis and Super NES versions, saying they improved over the previous FIFA with smoother, more realistic graphics and added modes and features. He noted that the Super NES version plays faster than the Genesis version but lacks the Genesis version's exciting crowd noise.

GamePro's brief review of the Game Boy version stated that it "may be the best sports title of the year for the handheld systems. All the moves – like tackles, headers, and bicycle kicks – are included along with countless teams from the U.S., Europe, and South America."
