= FIFA Soccer 95 =

1994 video game

- European cover art featuring Tottenham Hotspur's Erik Thorstvedt
- Developer: Extended Play Productions
- Publisher: EA Sports
- Composer: Jeff van Dyck
- Series: FIFA
- Platform: Sega Genesis
- Release: NA: 1994; EU: November 11, 1994
- Genre: Sports
- Modes: Single player, multiplayer

FIFA Soccer 95 is a 1994 football video game published by EA Sports. The game was released for the Sega Mega Drive in 1994. It is a sequel to FIFA International Soccer and the second game in the FIFA series.

== Gameplay ==
FIFA Soccer 95 is a video game that simulates football. The game utilizes an isometric viewpoint. The player controls one of the eleven footballers on their team, with the ability to switch to control another footballer. The game allows up to four players at the same time, each controlling a different footballer. The players can choose to control a footballer on the same team or on opposing teams. The remaining footballers are controlled by the computer.

Club sides are included for the first time in the series, with clubs from six leagues across Europe; the Premier League in England, Ligue 1 in France, the Bundesliga in Germany, Serie A in Italy, the Eredivisie in the Netherlands and La Liga in Spain. Several clubs from the Campeonato Brasileiro leagues in Brazil and clubs named for cities in the American Professional Soccer League in the US are also included. The licenses did not cover the player names, so fictional names are used instead.

Other new features compared to the previous game include the implementation of the penalty shootout to resolve games that finish in a draw after extra time (FIFA International Soccer had instead used next-goal-wins at the end of extra time).

== Development ==
In a November 1994 preview, German publication Sega Magazin reported that FIFA Soccer 95 would introduce more than 200 European club teams, alongside reworked player animations, faster gameplay and new tournament and season modes. The magazine also highlighted the addition of battery-backed saving, allowing players to preserve their progress in competitions.

== Reception ==
North American outlet GamePro gave the game a positive review; although the magazine were disappointed that there was less chanting and singing than in the previous game. The magazine rated FIFA '95 to be "the best soccer game yet." It particularly praised the removal of one-touch passing, saying this makes the game play more realistically, and the retention of most of the elements that made the predecessor great.

Reception in Europe was highly positive. British magazine Mean Machines Sega noted the improvements made to three elements of the gameplay that they considered weak points of the previous game – passing, set-pieces and goalkeeping. Also drawing praise was that the developers had "improved that which didn't seem to need improving". They concluded by describing it as an "excellent update" and the best football game available. French magazine Joypad praised the game's expanded selection of teams, tactical formations and match options, but questioned whether the improvements justified purchasing it for owners of the original game. The magazine awarded FIFA Soccer 95 a score of 95% for players who did not own FIFA International Soccer, compared with 82% for those who already owned it. German magazine MAN!AC gave the game 89 out of 100, praising its expanded league structure, improved controls, additional match options and multiplayer support.

Italian magazine Console Mania was similarly enthusiastic, awarding the game 96 out of 100 and describing it as the definitive football game for the Mega Drive, praising the improvements over its predecessor and its expanded selection of teams. Spanish magazine Hobby Consolas awarded it 94 out of 100, describing it as the best football game available at the time.

In Brazil, Ação Games praised the inclusion of 16 Brazilian clubs, but noted inaccuracies in their kit colours. The magazine highlighted that Internacional appeared in green and white instead of its traditional red and white, while Portuguesa's green and red colours were replaced by blue and white. Despite these errors, the publication praised the game's overall quality.

== Sales ==
FIFA Soccer 95 was the best-selling console game in the United Kingdom during the 1994 Christmas period. It remained the country's second best-selling cartridge game of 1995, behind FIFA Soccer 96. In Australia, FIFA Soccer 95 enjoyed an extended run in the Mega Drive sales chart supplied by retailer The Gamesmen and published in Hyper magazine. The game ranked second in January 1995 before topping the chart in February and March. It remained among the retailer's ten best-selling Mega Drive games in every monthly issue through November 1995, when it ranked fifth. In Spain, Pablo Crespo, director of video game retailer Centros Mail, identified FIFA Soccer '95 and Sonic & Knuckles among the leading Mega Drive games during the 1994 Christmas shopping season. In Sweden, FIFA Soccer 95 was the third-best-selling Mega Drive game during the 1994 Christmas shopping season, according to sales rankings supplied by local distributor Brio.

In Brazil, Tec Toy marketed a special edition of the Mega Drive III bundled with FIFA Soccer 95 and two six-button controllers.

The game would go on to sell 1.5 million copies.

== Legacy ==
FIFA Soccer 95 has been retrospectively recognised for its role in establishing the foundations of the FIFA series. In an interview with Retro Gamer, producer Bruce McMillan explained that he and development director Joey Della-Savia had organised the development team not only to produce a sequel to FIFA International Soccer, but also to establish the structure for a continuing franchise. The magazine highlighted the introduction of club teams, which had been omitted from the original game, as an important step in the series' development.

In a 2016 retrospective, The Guardian identified the inclusion of clubs from eight national leagues as part of Electronic Arts' early expansion of football licensing. The company pursued agreements for club rights to strengthen the series' competitive position, despite the associated costs.
