= Sega International Victory Goal =

1995 video game

- North American cover art
- Developer: Sega (Team Aquila)
- Publisher: Sega
- Composer: Jun Senoue
- Series: Sega Worldwide Soccer
- Platform: Sega Saturn
- Release: NA: May 11, 1995; EU: July 8, 1995; JPN: October 27, 1995
- Genre: Sports
- Modes: Single-player, multiplayer

Sega International Victory Goal (Note: Known as Worldwide Soccer: Sega International Victory Goal Edition in North America and International Victory Goal in Europe.) is a 1995 soccer video game developed and published by Sega for the Sega Saturn. It is the second game in the Sega Worldwide Soccer series following the Saturn's Japan-exclusive Victory Goal from earlier that year. Sega International Victory Goal was a launch title for the console in North America and Europe.

== Gameplay ==
International Victory Goal is a soccer game which allows the player to switch to three different camera angles during play. It is a four-player game if a Saturn multiplayer adapter is used. The game features polygon graphics and allows the option to rotate and zoom the camera view. The game begins with an FMV introductory sequence.

The Japanese release featured 12 national teams, replacing the J.League clubs of the original Victory Goal. Five game modes were available: Exhibition, W-League, S-League, Cup Tournament and Penalty Kick. W-League offered round-robin competitions of either 22 or 44 matches, while S-League provided alternative league scoring systems. The game retained the original's camera controls and replay system, with the Japanese edition offering 12 viewing options through different angles and zoom settings. Other improvements included more fluid player animations, greater involvement from full-backs in attacking moves, improved defensive positioning and four difficulty settings for computer-controlled opponents. Additional presentation features included national anthems following victories.

== Development and release ==
Sega International Victory Goal was adapted from Sega's Japanese football game Victory Goal. According to German magazine MAN!AC, the international version featured faster gameplay, replaced the Japanese J.League teams with 12 national teams and introduced English-language text. The game retained several modes, including tournaments, leagues and penalty shootouts, alongside three selectable camera perspectives.

In Brazil, the original Worldwide Soccer was among the Sega Saturn games available when Tec Toy officially launched the console on August 30, 1995.

== Reception ==
Reception

Review scores
Publication	Score
Electronic Gaming Monthly	16.5/20
Game Informer	8.75/10
Game Players	83%
GamePro	4.5/5
HobbyConsolas	90/100
Hyper	78%
Mean Machines Sega	66/100
Next Generation	3/5
Electronic Entertainment	4/5
Joypad	74%
MAN!AC	73%
Player One	90%
Power Unlimited	83/100
Sega MegaZone	80%
Sega Pro	71%
SuperJuegos	90/100
TodoSega	91%
Ultimate Future Games	70%
VideoGames	8/10

Next Generation gave the Saturn version of the game three stars out of five, commending the gameplay despite faulting some elements in the game design. GamePro said that "Head-to-head games, tournament options, penalty shootouts, awesome cinematics, instant replays, and more score a goal for Victory." Games World rated the game 65% and stated that even though it substituted international teams for Japanese teams, "the UK game still struggles to score". Ultimate Future Games rated the game 70% and said that it "just doesn't have the depth or ease of play of its contemporaries" while praising its angles and views. MAXIMUM Magazine gave the game two stars and called it "a frankly unacceptable release" noting that is visuals did not make up for its poor gameplay. The original Japanese Victory Goal received a score of 78% from Australian magazine Hyper in June 1995. Reviewer Ben Mansill praised its attractive graphics, rotating camera perspectives and multiplayer gameplay, but criticised the simplistic controls, artificial intelligence and background music. Although he regarded the game as enjoyable with other players, he considered its single-player experience less sophisticated than FIFA International Soccer.

Reception in Europe was mixed. British magazine Mean Machines Sega awarded the game 66%, acknowledging its appeal as a football game but criticising its presentation, controls and technical shortcomings. The magazine considered it a disappointing conversion despite recognising some of its entertainment value. French magazine Player One awarded International Victory Goal 90%, praising its fluid animations, responsive controls and attractive presentation. The magazine particularly commended its animation, which received an individual score of 94%. German magazine MAN!AC gave it 73%, praising the available playing options and camera perspectives while criticising the gameplay and artificial intelligence, particularly the behaviour of computer-controlled teammates and goalkeepers. Spanish magazine TodoSega awarded it 91%, praising its graphics, multiple camera perspectives, replay system and variety of playing options. However, the reviewers criticised the limited selection of 12 national teams and the use of fictional player names.

In 1996, Next Generation listed Worldwide Soccer 2 as number 47 on their "Top 100 Games of All Time".

In Japan, Sega International Victory Goal ranked fourth in Saturn Fan's Sega Saturn sales chart for the period from October 24 to November 7, 1995, climbing from ninth place in the previous ranking.
