= Michael Owen's WLS 2000 =

1999 video game

- Developer: Silicon Dreams Studio
- Publishers: EU: THQ; NA: SouthPeak Interactive
- Producers: Matt Molloy; David Rutter
- Platform: Nintendo 64
- Release: EU: 24 September 1999; NA: 9 November 2000
- Genre: Sports
- Modes: Single-player, multiplayer

Michael Owen's WLS 2000 is an association football video game developed by Silicon Dreams Studio and published by THQ for the Nintendo 64. Released on 24 September 1999, the game stars English footballer Michael Owen. It is the third and final game in the World League Soccer series after World League Soccer '98 and Michael Owen's World League Soccer '99.

Michael Owen's WLS 2000 received reskinned versions for releases outside the United Kingdom; RTL World League Soccer 2000 in Germany and Telefoot Soccer 2000 in France. The only licensed players included in these versions are Premier League players. Most notably it was reskinned as Mia Hamm Soccer 64, starring Mia Hamm and was published in North America by SouthPeak Interactive.

== Development ==
Michael Owen's WLS 2000 was originally announced by Eidos Interactive in September 1998, as a Nintendo 64 conversion of Silicon Dreams Studio's previous World League Soccer game, Michael Owen's World League Soccer '99. However, it was put on hold as Eidos Interactive did not find itself suitable for the Nintendo 64 market, until it was announced, in August 1999, that THQ had picked up the game for further production. It was reported that Owen received £300,000 to perform motion-capture and lend his image for the title.

== Mia Hamm Soccer 64 ==
The North American release of Michael Owen's WLS 2000 was reskinned to feature American soccer star Mia Hamm, and published by SouthPeak Interactive as Mia Hamm Soccer 64, on 9 November 2000. This version was developed within twelve weeks by DC Studios, to take advantage of the high profile of Hamm and the United States women's national soccer team, who had just won the 1999 FIFA Women's World Cup, and be released in time for the upcoming Electronic Entertainment Expo (E3) and the 2000 Sydney Olympics. The athletes in the Hamm version were hand-animated, while Michael Owen's WLS 2000 used motion capture.

Mia Hamm Soccer 64 was one of the first sports games to star female athletes, with Wendy Gebauer serving as commentator. In a December 2000 interview, Patti Miller of Children Now stated that the game was one of the "positive examples of games for girls". In a 2012 interview, psychologist Fernanda Schabarum retrospectively noted that the game was a "good example of the wrong timing and the wrong approach" in the matter of women in sports-oriented video games, and David Rutter, producer for the game, stated that the game being a reskin "made it appear more of cynical marketing tactic than a game really interested in women's sports".

In the United States, Mia Hamm Soccer 64 sold a "relatively high" 42,886 copies. Gameplay features 18 football teams in the hypothetical U.S. Women's League, 32 national teams, and Mia Hamm's All-Star Team. Different game modes, such as Practice and World Cup, where the player can play on a team, with or against Hamm, in a World Cup tournament, are also included.The game does not feature official licenses because Mia Hamm is the only real player in the game.

== Game Boy Color tie-in ==
Like the Nintendo 64 game, the North American release of the Game Boy Color tie-in had a Mia Hamm reskin developed; titled Mia Hamm Soccer Shootout, it was released by SouthPeak Interactive on 27 October 2000.
