= Sega Worldwide Soccer =

- Genre: Sports
- Publisher: Sega
- Platforms: Sega Saturn, Dreamcast, Windows
- First release: Victory Goal; 1995
- Latest release: Sega Worldwide Soccer 2000 Euro Edition; 2000

Sega Worldwide Soccer is a series of soccer games by Sega. The series was first launched for the Sega Saturn and later moved to the Dreamcast. The games were released between 1995 and 2000.

== History ==
Sega Worldwide Soccer, produced by Sega themselves, was a launch game for the Sega Saturn's North American release. It was preceded by International Victory Goal, one of the debut titles of the console. The game featured international teams and league, play-off and tournament modes. Although it used fictional player names (due to the lack of a license), the non-volatile memory of the Saturn allowed editing of names. The team kits were as close to the official 1996 kits as possible. The game was the top-rated football game until International Superstar Soccer 64 was released one year later. Worldwide Soccer was later ported to the PC.

For the 1996 Japanese sequel, J.League Victory Goal '96, Sega introduced motion-captured player animations and polygonal footballers to reproduce more realistic movement. The game featured all 16 J.League clubs for the 1996 season, including two newly admitted teams, with individual player characteristics such as their preferred kicking foot. Other additions included three stadium designs, weather and day/night settings, and 12 camera viewpoints.

One year later Sega Worldwide Soccer 98 was released, again for the Saturn. This version featured (still unlicensed) clubs from England, Spain and France, two new stadiums and the same free-flowing gameplay. US international Cobi Jones appears on the cover of the American version.

One final title, Sega Worldwide Soccer 2000, appeared on the Dreamcast. However, instead of being developed in-house, Silicon Dreams Studio (who previously worked with Eidos on the UEFA Champions League series and also World League Soccer '98) was given the rights to produce a game bearing the Worldwide Soccer name. An update titled Sega Worldwide Soccer 2000: Euro Edition (capitalizing on the popularity of Euro 2000) was released on the Dreamcast in Europe. During a 1999 promotional session organised by the French official Dreamcast Magazine with Sega, footballer Thierry Henry criticised Sega Worldwide Soccer 2000 for its slow pace. When asked about his favourite Dreamcast game, he instead named Power Stone and praised its freedom of movement and environmental interaction. German magazine MAN!AC awarded Sega Worldwide Soccer 2000 77%, praising its controls and realistic gameplay while criticising the difficulty of scoring goals.

== Games ==
Title	Platform	USA	Europe	Japan	Notes
Victory Goal	Saturn	No	No	1995-01-20	Also known as J. League Victory Goal.
Sega International Victory Goal	Saturn	1995-05-11	1995-07-08	No	North American cover art name: Worldwide Soccer: Sega International Victory Goal Edition; European cover art name: International Victory Goal
Sega International Victory Goal	Saturn	No	No	1995-10-27	Upgraded engine and different presentation. Not the same game as the previous, identically titled, Western edition.
J. League Victory Goal '96	Saturn	No	No	1996-03-29	New engine with 3D players, roster updated to the 1996 J. League season.
Sega Worldwide Soccer 97	Saturn, Windows	1996-10-16	1996-10-17	1996-11-29	Released in Japan as Victory Goal Worldwide Edition. Released on PC as Sega Worldwide Soccer PC
J. League Victory Goal '97	Saturn	No	No	1997-03-14	Updated roster
Sega Worldwide Soccer 98	Saturn, Windows	1997-11-19	1997-10-16	1998-03-05	Released in Europe as Sega Worldwide Soccer 98: Club Edition featuring clubs from England, France, Spain.
World Cup '98 France: Road to Win	Saturn	No	No	1998-06-11	Fully licensed game featuring all the clubs and players from the 1998 competition.
Sega Worldwide Soccer 2000	Dreamcast	No	1999-12-01	No	
Sega Worldwide Soccer 2000 Euro Edition	Dreamcast	No	2000-05-26	No	Upgrade to the previous game, with European clubs.

== Reception ==
GamePro gave Worldwide Soccer a positive review, praising the graphics, zooming camera, and the demanding gameplay, though they did criticize the "magnetic" dribbling and passing as being less realistic than the dribbling and passing in 3DO FIFA. Out of 5, they gave it ratings of 5 for graphics, 4 for sound, 4.5 for control, and 4.5 for fun factor.

== See also ==
- Wave Master
