= Sega Worldwide Soccer 97 =

1996 video game

- Developer: Sega (Team Aquila)
- Publisher: Sega
- Director: Toshinori Asai
- Producer: Akira Kozu
- Composers: Jun Senoue; Seirou Okamoto
- Series: Sega Worldwide Soccer
- Platforms: Sega Saturn, Microsoft Windows
- Release: Sega Saturn: EU: October 17, 1996; NA: October 28, 1996; JP: November 29, 1996; Windows: NA: September 3, 1997; JP: September 25, 1997
- Genre: Sports
- Modes: Single-player, multiplayer

Sega Worldwide Soccer 97 is a 1996 football video game developed by Sega's Team Aquila for the Sega Saturn. Released in Japan as Victory Goal Worldwide Edition, it was subsequently ported to Microsoft Windows in 1997, where the Japanese edition was titled Sega Worldwide Soccer PC. A successor to Victory Goal, the game features international national teams and several league and cup competition modes.

The Saturn version received widespread critical acclaim, particularly for its player animations, controls and tactical options. Contemporary publications regarded it as one of the console's leading football games, with Saturn Power praising its depth and artificial intelligence. The game also achieved chart success in several European markets and was followed by Sega Worldwide Soccer '98.

== Gameplay ==
Sega Worldwide Soccer 97 features more than 48 international teams. Because the game did not possess licences for real player names, most players are fictional, although their names can be edited using the Sega Saturn's internal memory. The teams' kits were designed to resemble their contemporary real-world counterparts.

Four principal modes are included: Exhibition, World League, Worldwide Cup and Cup Tournament. The Worldwide Cup mode, modelled on the upcoming 1998 FIFA World Cup in France, features qualifying rounds involving 48 national teams, followed by a 32-team final tournament. A separate world-ranking system adjusts the standings of national teams according to match results. The game also includes a penalty-kick practice mode.

Players can customise match conditions by selecting stadiums, weather and camera angles, as well as adjusting team strategies and formations. Unlike its predecessor, which automatically performed certain special shots, the game allows players to execute these techniques deliberately, including low shots, looping shots, diving headers and overhead kicks. Players can also adjust the direction of their shots. Matches incorporate player injuries and suspensions, statistical tracking and instant replays. The game also features play-by-play commentary and allows the player to alter the viewing angle during replays.

The game also includes a create-a-player feature and supports multiplayer play.

== Development and release ==
Unlike the earlier Western Worldwide Soccer, which had been adapted from a game originally designed around Japan's J.League, Sega Worldwide Soccer 97 was designed with international teams in mind from the outset. According to a September 1996 preview in Sega Saturn Magazine the sequel was created by a largely new programming team. The magazine highlighted expanded tactical options, including team formations and substitutions, support for four-player matches and improvements to defensive artificial intelligence and player movement.

For the English-language commentary, Sega Europe recruited Gary Bloom, known for his work on Channel 4's Football Italia. Rather than merely identifying players or providing random remarks, the commentary was designed to respond to developing attacks, tactical situations and the general flow of play.

The Windows conversion introduced network multiplayer, which was absent from the Saturn version. Players could compete in two-player matches using a modem or serial cable, or in matches supporting up to four players over a local area network. The PC release also included an in-game chat facility, with an option to pause gameplay while chatting.

=== Music ===
The game's music was created by members of Sega's sound staff including Jun Senoue and Seirou Okamoto. The Japanese Saturn version, released as Victory Goal Worldwide Edition, featured the vocal theme "Try!!! (The Biggest Game of the World)", composed by Senoue and performed by Aki Kawazuru. The song later appeared on the 1997 album SEGA Vocal Entertainment and the 2004 compilation SEGA Saturn History ~Saturn Was Young~ First Volume.

Senoue revisited the theme for the 2005 album READY! / J×J. The track "As the Wind Blows" was an arrangement of "Try!!!", with Senoue providing the arrangement, guitar and keyboards.

=== Release ===
For the North American release, Sega selected United States international and LA Galaxy player Cobi Jones to appear on the cover. GameRevolution reported that Sega promoted Jones following the early success of Major League Soccer, issuing a press release announcing his selection for the box art. Jones also appeared as a player on the United States team.

Sega promoted Sega Worldwide Soccer '97 through print advertising across Europe. In the United Kingdom, advertisements appeared in the Daily Mirror on 3 and 17 October 1996, with the former announcing the game's 17 October release date and highlighting favourable reviews from Computer and Video Games and Sega Saturn Magazine. Additional advertisements appeared in Spain's Hobby Consolas and Germany's Sega Magazin in late 1996.

The game was also converted for Windows 95 and released in Japan as Sega Worldwide Soccer PC on 25 September 1997, with a suggested retail price of ¥7,800.

== Reception ==
Reception

Review scores
Publication	Score
Game Informer	9.25/10
GameSpot	7.6/10 (SAT)
Next Generation	5/5 (SAT)
Sega Saturn Magazine	94% (SAT)

The original Sega Saturn release was met with critical acclaim. Tom Hall of GameSpot said it "may be the best soccer game ever released"; GamePro called it "a completely fresh, must-play gaming experience"; Rob Alsetter wrote in Sega Saturn Magazine that it was "perhaps the best soccer sim yet"; and Next Generation's review concluded, "Quite simply, WWS '97 is the best recreation of any sport, ever." Common subjects of praise were the smoothness of the player animations, the easy-to-learn controls, the realistic soccer elements, and the way the game encourages players to be spontaneous and creative. In a February 1997 feature on sports video games, Computer and Video Games identified Sega Worldwide Soccer '97 as having displaced US Gold's Olympic Soccer as a leading football title.

Writing for Australian magazine Hyper, David Wildgoose awarded the Saturn version 95% and the magazine's "Big Rubber Stamp of Approval" in January 1997. Wildgoose praised the game's intuitive controls, detailed player animations, atmospheric stadiums and changing weather conditions, as well as its replay features and multiplayer gameplay. He considered its on-field gameplay superior to that of FIFA, particularly the freedom afforded by its passing and movement systems. However, he criticised the generic commentary, absence of licensed players and club teams, and limited selection of national sides. Although he regarded FIFA as the stronger overall package, Wildgoose concluded that Worldwide Soccer '97 offered the more enjoyable football gameplay.

French publications were similarly enthusiastic. Player One awarded Sega Worldwide Soccer '97 94%, describing it as a worthy 32-bit successor to International Superstar Soccer. The reviewers praised its realistic motion-captured player animations, intelligent computer-controlled teammates and intuitive controls, with one declaring it the best football game on 32-bit consoles, although the soundtrack received some criticism. Joypad also awarded the game 94%, praising its fluid player animations, extensive options and selection of 48 national teams. However, the magazine criticised a gameplay exploit that allowed players to score easily by dribbling past the goalkeeper.

German publications were also favourable, although their assessments were somewhat more reserved. MAN!AC awarded the game 80%, praising its presentation, controls, multiplayer gameplay and impressive graphics, but found it lacking the tactical and statistical depth of more simulation-oriented football titles. Mega Fun was more enthusiastic, awarding the game 89% and declaring that it had displaced FIFA Soccer 96 as the benchmark for football video games. The magazine praised its realistic player animations, atmospheric stadium presentation, extensive game modes and tactical options, although it criticised the absence of licensed player names and limited team-kit selections. In January 1997, Mega Fun subsequently included the game in its "Gold Game" selection of the best video games.

Reception for the game was also similarly positive in Southern Europe. Italian magazine Console Mania awarded the game 91 out of 100, praising its player animations, responsive controls and ball physics, and considering it an effective balance between arcade-style gameplay and simulation. In Spain, Hobby Consolas awarded Sega Worldwide Soccer '97 94%, praising its impressive graphics, realistic player animations, tactical depth and extensive gameplay options. The magazine regarded the game as a sophisticated football simulation rather than a conventional arcade-style title, noting that its demanding gameplay was particularly suited to experienced players. However, it criticised the absence of club teams from all countries and occasional excessive slowdowns.

Contemporary Central European publications were also highly positive. Polish magazine Gambler awarded the game 90%, describing it as the best football simulation then available for home systems and stating that it surpassed FIFA 96. Another Polish magazine, Konsola, likewise gave the game 90%, praising its controls, smooth gameplay and player animation, and described it as the best football simulation released for the Saturn. The reviewer also considered its player movement superior to that of FIFA 96, although the game's graphics were criticized for occasionally appearing crude. Hungarian magazine 576 KByte awarded it 95%, particularly praising the lifelike player animation, controls and presentation.

Japanese Sega Saturn Magazine awarded Sega Worldwide Soccer '97, released in Japan as Victory Goal WORLD WIDE edition, individual reviewer scores of 7, 8 and 8 out of 10. The reviewers praised the game's stadium atmosphere, commentary and smooth player animations, although some criticised the complexity of the controls and the absence of Japanese-language text. One reviewer considered the game an improvement over its predecessor, highlighting its faster gameplay and expanded international setting. In the final Sega Saturn Magazine reader rankings, subsequently compiled in the 2000 book Saturn no Game wa Sekai Ichi!, the game ranked 222nd among 945 rated Sega Saturn titles, receiving an average reader score of 8.5426 out of 10.

The Windows version received a more mixed critical response. Brazilian magazine Ação Games awarded it 8.5 out of 10, praising its camera angles, graphics and playability. Italy's PC Game Parade gave it 82 out of 100, commending its graphical presentation and variety of gameplay options, although it criticised the use of fictional player names. Polish magazine Secret Service awarded it 7 out of 10, praising its variety of moves and freedom of control while considering the conversion inferior to the Saturn original. The reviewer also criticised the absence of authentic player names, slow loading times and weak commentary. In the United States, Hugo Foster of GameSpot gave the PC version 6.2 out of 10, praising its graphics and gameplay while criticising its repetitive audio and limited improvements over established PC football games.

== Commercial performance ==
Sega Worldwide Soccer '97 debuted at number three in Hobby Consolas' Sega Saturn chart in Spain in November 1996, rising to second place in December. The game remained a presence on the chart during 1997, ranking second in March, fourth in July and tenth in September. It also topped the Sega Saturn sales chart broadcast by Portugal's Templo dos Jogos in December 1996. In the United Kingdom, Sega Worldwide Soccer '97 entered the ELSPA/Chart-Track CD all-formats sales chart at number five in October 1996, and was among top-selling Sega Saturn games of 1996 at HMV's Oxford Street store. In the January 1997 issue of the magazine Computer and Video Games, Worldwide Soccer '97 ranked 18th on the UK multi-format sales chart, and rose to 17th in the February issue.

In Brazil, Sega Worldwide Soccer '97 ranked seventh in Ação Games magazine's chart of the most-rented 16-bit and 32-bit console games between 10 January and 10 February 1997. The ranking was compiled from six participating video game rental shops across the country. Additionally, Brazilian distributor Tec Toy included the game in a three-game Sega Saturn console bundle alongside Daytona USA: Championship Circuit Edition and Virtua Fighter Remix.

The game was subsequently included alongside Sega Rally Championship in Sega's Saturn "Action Pack", launched in France on 4 March 1997. Sega France stated at the time that Worldwide Soccer '97 had remained near the top of the charts since its release. Similar bundles were also released in Germany and the United Kingdom.

The PC version was distributed in South Korea by SKC, with approximately 10,000 copies sold in 1997, making it one of the company's more successful titles that year. Electronic Times reported that interest in the game had increased following South Korea's qualifying campaign for the 1998 FIFA World Cup. In the United Kingdom, a December 2006 Chart-Track report recorded estimated cumulative sales of 10,382 copies for a budget-priced PC edition.

== Legacy ==
Sega Worldwide Soccer 97 appeared on several European television programmes. In 1996, the British television programme GamesMaster featured professional footballer Richard Rufus competing against Michael Duberry and Chris Armstrong in matches using the game. That December, contestants competed against each other on CyberMaster, a Portuguese television competition programme broadcast by RTP. The game also appeared on the Polish television programme Escape, broadcast by Polonia 1, which showed footage from the game.

The game received mainstream television exposure in Germany when it was demonstrated on an episode of Sat.1's Ranissimo on 10 November 1996. During the programme, German international Thomas Häßler played a simulated Germany–Portugal match, which ended in a 1–1 draw and featured commentary by Jörg Wontorra. According to Sega Magazin, the demonstration was seen by nearly four million television viewers.

In March 1997, Sega España general manager José Ángel Sánchez cited Sega Worldwide Soccer 97 alongside Sega Rally Championship and Virtua Fighter 2 as Saturn exclusives which, in his view, had not been surpassed by competing titles in their respective genres.

Electronic Gaming Monthly ranked Sega Worldwide Soccer 97 74th in its list of the 100 best console video games of all time in November 1997. The magazine stated that the game had "set the standard for all other soccer games to follow", comparing its position among football games to that of the Madden NFL and NHL series in their respective sports. It particularly praised the player animation, artificial intelligence, passing system and graphics.

The game also influenced the development of Konami's International Superstar Soccer 64. While developing its Japanese predecessor, Jikkyō J.League: Perfect Striker, Konami's development team identified Sega's Victory Goal—released internationally as Sega Worldwide Soccer 97—as the game that had most influenced the project. The team said that, having previously worked primarily on 16-bit football games, they regarded Sega's title as the leading football game on 32-bit hardware and used it as their main competition. In a separate contemporary interview, designer Yasuo Okuda likewise described Victory Goal as the team's main rival and the best 32-bit football game.
