= FIFA International Soccer =

1993 video game

- European cover art with David Platt and Piotr Świerczewski
- Developers: Extended Play Productions; Creative Assembly (MS-DOS); Tiertex (GG); Tec Toy (MS)
- Publisher: EA Sports
- Composers: Jeff van Dyck; Graeme Coleman (3DO); Anthony N. Putson (Amiga); Ray Deefholts (DOS)
- Series: FIFA
- Platforms: Mega Drive/Genesis, 3DO, Amiga, MS-DOS, Game Boy, Game Gear, Sega CD, Master System, Super NES
- Release: Mega Drive/Genesis: EU: December 3, 1993; NA: December 1993; JP: June 10, 1994; Ports; 1994
- Genres: Sports (association football)
- Modes: Single-player, multiplayer

FIFA International Soccer (also known as FIFA 94) is a 1993 association football video game developed by EA Canada's Extended Play Productions team and published by EA Sports. The game was released for the Sega Mega Drive/Genesis console in December 1993 and ported to numerous other systems in 1994. It is the first game in the FIFA series.

The game was positively received by critics upon release; critics lauded the detail and animation of the footballers in the game, the crowd sound effects, and the overall presentation. The speed the game ran at and issues with the response to the player's input were seen as the game's primary faults. The 3DO version added multiple camera views and more detailed graphics than other versions. The game sold well, with the Mega Drive version becoming the best-selling home video game of 1993 in the United Kingdom. It later served as a pack-in game for the Goldstar 3DO, and led to a sequel, FIFA Soccer 95.

== Gameplay ==
Gameplay showing the isometric viewpoint, the way the view moves to keep the ball on-screen and footballer animation.

FIFA International Soccer simulates the sport of association football. In particular, the game is based on international matches. The game utilises an isometric viewpoint, unlike other football games at the time such as Tehkan World Cup or Sensible Soccer which utilised a bird's-eye view or Kick Off which used a top-down view. The player controls one of the eleven footballers on their team at a time, with the ability to switch players on command. The game allows up to four human players at the same time, each controlling a different footballer. The players can choose to control a footballer on the same team or on opposing teams. The remaining footballers are controlled by the computer.

Four modes of play — Exhibition, Tournament, Playoffs, and League — are available. Exhibition engages the player in a single match. Tournament mode resembles the format of the FIFA World Cup, UEFA European Championship, with the player controlling a team of their choice through a series of matches, starting with three group games with the possibility of progressing to four further games in a knockout format. Playoffs mode takes the same form, but skips the group games and starts at the first knockout game. League consists of eight teams who contest a double round-robin tournament.

The game features 48 national teams in total, plus a team called EA All Stars. Every team has 20 players. The players are fictional (some of them, e.g. Tim Ansell of England or Joe Della-Savia of Italy, are named after people credited as the development team) and look the same, except for darker skin of certain teams' players. There is also commentary from Tony Gubba (PC CD-ROM version).

An oversight by the developers makes it easy to score a goal by making a player stand in front of the opponent's goalkeeper when he holds the ball in his hands and is about to clear it away. The computer-controlled goalkeeper will kick the ball to the opposing player, giving the other an easy chance to score.

== Playable nations ==
There are 48 national teams in the game:

AFC

- China
- Hong Kong
- Iraq
- Israel
- Japan
- Qatar
- Turkey

CAF

- Algeria
- Cameroon
- Ivory Coast
- Morocco
- Nigeria

CONCACAF

- Canada
- Mexico
- United States

CONMEBOL

- Argentina
- Brazil
- Chile
- Colombia
- Uruguay

OFC

- Australia
- New Zealand

UEFA

- Austria
- Belgium
- Bulgaria
- Czech Republic
- Denmark
- England
- France
- Germany
- Greece
- Holland
- Hungary
- Italy
- Luxembourg
- Northern Ireland
- Norway
- Poland
- Portugal
- Republic of Ireland
- Romania
- Russia
- Scotland
- Spain
- Sweden
- Switzerland
- Ukraine
- Wales

== Development ==
Electronic Arts (EA) had first ventured in the sports games market in 1988 with an American football title, John Madden Football. Updated versions of the game, along with golf and ice hockey games, followed under the EASN (Electronic Arts Sports Network) banner. EA's European arm carried out research into the possibility of a sports game that would appeal to European audiences and decided that an association football game would stand the best chance of success, predicting high sales figures. EA US gave the go-ahead for the project to proceed, and a team of ten developers at EA's Canadian studios began work on the project led by Bruce McMillan. Initially, the development took place for the Sega Mega Drive/Genesis under the working title of EA Soccer, with a small budget of around $50,000-$100,000. The football game market leader at the time was Sensible Soccer, followed by Kick Off, which both used top-down viewpoints. EA's UK team looked at both games, but felt they needed to do something different to set themselves apart, by adding more realism and an isometric viewpoint. A December 1993 report in French magazine Mega Force, following a visit to Electronic Arts' British offices, stated that FIFA International Soccer had received a promotional budget of approximately £1 million and had undergone twelve months of development.

Other EA Sports titles held official licences from the leagues depicted to allow real team names, players and stadia to be included, and with a view to securing the same for their football title, EA signed a five-year deal with football's governing body, FIFA. The deal involved "minuscule" royalty payments, and on further inspection the reason became clear. The licence didn't include any team names, logos, player names, likenesses or stadia. The game would therefore only include national teams identified by country names and flags, and player names would be made up – several of the developers added their own names into the game. The licence for the forthcoming 1994 FIFA World Cup tournament was held by U.S. Gold and their game was due for a Spring 1994 release in time for the tournament which was to take place in Summer 1994. EA decided they would need to bring forward their game ahead of the U.S. Gold title, and aimed for a Christmas 1993 release.

Questioning the recognition that the FIFA licence held in North America, EA suggested the game be released as Team USA Soccer in North America. Fearing a sales flop, they reversed the decision and decided to release the game worldwide under the FIFA International Soccer title, providing the option of moving unsold stock to other markets. Development of the game was completed in November 1993.

In June 1995, Atari Corporation struck a deal with EA to bring select titles from their catalog to the Atari Jaguar CD, with FIFA International Soccer being among them, however, this version was never released due to the commercial and critical failure of the Atari Jaguar platform.

In Brazil, distributor Tec Toy released a special Mega Drive III console bundle containing FIFA International Soccer. Tec Toy subsequently released a Master System version exclusively in Brazil in October 1996, featuring Portuguese-language text.

== Reception ==
=== Sales ===
EA initially anticipated sales of around 300,000 copies of the game in Europe. Despite being released in December 1993, FIFA International Soccer sold more than 500,000 copies for the Sega Mega Drive and became the best-selling video game of the year in Europe. In the United Kingdom, the game sold 400,000 copies in the final two weeks of December, becoming the fifth best-selling home video game of 1993 in the country. The game remained number-one on the UK console charts through early 1994. In Italy, a January 1995 advertisement for FIFA Soccer 95 in Consolemania described its predecessor as the best-selling game of 1993, although the advertisement did not specify the geographical market or sales figures. In Spain, the Mega-CD version topped Hobby Consolas magazine's monthly Mega-CD rankings in September and October 1994, and ranked second in December. In Sweden, FIFA International Soccer was the third-best-selling Mega Drive game of 1993, behind NHL '94 and Disney's Aladdin, despite being released in December. Swedish video game historian Martin Lindell identified the game as one of the sports titles that helped broaden the Mega Drive's appeal to older players in the country.

In Australia, FIFA International Soccer continued to appear in retailer-supplied sales charts during 1995. The Super Nintendo version ranked seventh in January and tenth in February, while the PC version ranked ninth in January. These charts were supplied by Australian retailer The Gamesmen and published by Hyper magazine. In the United States, it topped the Super NES sales chart in June 1994.

=== Critical ===
Reception

Review scores
Publication	Score						
Publication	3DO	Amiga	DOS	Game Boy	Game Gear	Sega Genesis	SNES
Amiga Power	N/A	76%	N/A	N/A	N/A	N/A	N/A
Computer and Video Games	N/A	N/A	86/100	78/100	N/A	92% 86% (CD)	90/100
Edge	7/10	N/A	N/A	N/A	N/A	8/10	N/A
Electronic Gaming Monthly	N/A	N/A	N/A	N/A	N/A	N/A	33/40
GamePro	18/20	N/A	N/A	N/A	N/A	19/20; 17.5/20 (CD)	16.5/20
Mean Machines Sega	N/A	N/A	N/A	N/A	N/A	94%	N/A
Next Generation	5/5	N/A	N/A	N/A	N/A	N/A	5/5
Official Nintendo Magazine	N/A	N/A	N/A	40/100	N/A	N/A	92/100
Player One	N/A	N/A	N/A	N/A	90%	94% (CD)	N/A
Video Games (DE)	N/A	N/A	N/A	82%	N/A	77%	82%
CU Amiga	N/A	89%	N/A	N/A	N/A	N/A	N/A
The One	N/A	87%	N/A	N/A	N/A	N/A	N/A

FIFA International Soccer received mostly positive comments from the press. Reviewing the original Mega Drive version, Edge magazine praised the way the crowd sounds reacted to the play on the field as well as the visual detail of the players and their animations with the isometric view. They highlighted that this did make for a slower game than one using a top-down view and described it a more of a simulator than a console game. Mean Machines Sega described the game as the "greatest soccer game yet seen", praising the "superlative presentation" and the "utterly amazing" animation. With only minor concerns around the response time to the players input and the lack of an on-screen clock graphic, they awarded a score of 94%. Computer Gaming World in June 1994 said "this is stunning. FIFA ... is a remarkably complete simulation of the sport". The magazine stated that "In no other game can you achieve such a high degree of pinpoint accuracy when passing", and praised players executing offensive or defensive stance depending on location.

Reception in continental Europe for the Mega Drive game was highly positive. French magazine Joypad awarded the game 95%, describing it as an essential title and, in the reviewer's view, the best football game available on consoles. German magazine MAN!AC gave the game 88 out of 100, praising its fast and challenging gameplay, distinctive visual presentation and sound. Italian magazine Consolemania awarded the game 95 out of 100, describing it as possibly the finest football game available on any console or computer. The magazine praised its extensive gameplay options, responsive controls, tactical customisation and audiovisual presentation. Several contributors also highlighted its unusual camera perspective, with one considering it the most complete football game he had played on the Mega Drive. In a 2022 retrospective, Spanish magazine Hobby Consolas recalled that its original review of the Mega Drive version awarded the game 93 out of 100; the publication described FIFA International Soccer as revolutionary when it was released.

Next Generation reviewed the Super NES version of the game, rating it four stars out of five, and stated that "FIFA International Soccer for the Super NES is a great game. With its extremely fast action, sharp graphics, and sensible gameplay, this title is a winner." GamePro gave the SNES version a positive review, commenting that "Strong and varied game play makes this the most realistic soccer game for the SNES." They also praised the graphics, animation, digitized crowd chants, and accessibility to players of all skill levels. They later commented that the Sega CD version is essentially identical to the Genesis and SNES versions aside from the addition of some full-motion video clips, but that this is not a bad thing because the previous versions didn't leave any room for improvement.

Next Generation reviewed the 3DO version, and noted that this port differed considerably from the original Genesis version and most other ports, with the addition of multiple views, a rotating-camera effect and more detailed graphics. They described it as the "killer-app graphics showhorse" for the 3DO console, awarding it a maximum five star score. GamePro similarly remarked "FIFA 3DO is no mere port-over from the cartridge market." They especially praised the highly detailed graphics, multiple views, realistic gameplay, and six-player support.

Reviewing the Amiga port, most publications spoke favourably of the game's appearance. Amiga Power, CU Amiga and The One magazines all highlighted the amount of disk swapping required to play the game as a drawback. Reaction to the changes in the controls required to adapt from the three buttons available on the Mega Drive controller to the single button common on most Amiga joysticks were mixed. Amiga Format said of hitting the button in an attempt to shoot at the goal, "occasionally the ball flies into the onion bag; other times it seems you are just passing the ball to the keeper." Amiga Power described the outcome of pressing the button as random. The One, however, describes the control system as "excellent – to the point that it's easier to control" in comparison to the Mega Drive.

=== Accolades ===
At the Computer '94 trade fair in Cologne in November 1994, FIFA Soccer received the Spiel des Jahres '94 (Game of the Year) award in the Sega category. The award was accepted by Electronic Arts managing director Wolfram von Eichborn. The judging panel comprised representatives from Sega Magazin, Mega Fun, Play Time, PC Games and Amiga Games.

In 1996, Next Generation listed the Genesis and 3DO versions as number 71 on their "Top 100 Games of All Time", saying it "put 3DO on the map after a year of disappointing titles for the system, and ... breathed life into EA's flagging sports line-up." They cited the zooming camera angles and the ability to have up to six players on the 3DO version as highlights. VideoGames awarded it Best 3DO Game of 1994. In 1995, Total! ranked the game 18th in their "Top 100 SNES Games." They praised the isometric graphics that gave the game more realistic and better animated visuals and praised the sound effects. In 1995, Flux magazine rated the 3DO version 53rd on its Top 100 Video Games writing: "Player Controllable camera angles help make FIFA 3DO, without a doubt, the most advanced sports title to date."

== Legacy ==
In 1993, FIFA International Soccer was featured on the British television programme GamesMaster, where professional footballers Les Ferdinand, Vinnie Jones and John Barnes competed using the game.

A sequel, FIFA Soccer 95, was released in July 1994 exclusively for the Mega Drive/Genesis. This started the FIFA series, with a new game released every year since in the main series, alongside spin-off series games based around a particular tournament. The series passed 100 million total sales in 2010, and EA's licence to use the FIFA title runs through to 2022. The Sega Genesis version was included as an extra in the sixth-generation console versions of FIFA 06, which has been referred as FIFA 94.
