= World League Soccer '98 =

1998 video game

- Developer: Silicon Dreams Studio
- Publishers: Eidos Interactive (Playstation, PC) Sega (Sega Saturn)
- Platforms: Sega Saturn, PlayStation, Windows
- Release: May 28, 1998
- Genre: Association football
- Modes: Single-player, Multiplayer

World League Soccer '98 is an association football video game developed by Silicon Dreams Studio. It was published in May 1998 by Eidos Interactive on the Sony PlayStation and PC, and by Sega on the Sega Saturn. Silicon Dreams developed two sequels: Michael Owen's World League Soccer '99 and Michael Owen's WLS 2000.

== Development ==
The game was developed over more than two years by about 25 people, with three months of research and design work starting in late 1995 before proper development began in early 1996. (Note: In an early 1998 interview with Game Post, World League Soccer '98's director Robert Palfreman said that the game had been in development for 18 months, including research and design, but in a contemporary interview with Sega Saturn Magazine, Palfreman said development began in late 1995, and a programmer for the game, Giles Park, said he had been working on it for 24 months.) In-game commentary was provided by Peter Brackley, and post-game commentary was provided by Ray Wilkins.

The animations for the game were created by motion capturing Les Ferdinand at Silicon Dreams' in-house motion capture studio.

The game features fourteen stadiums and allows players to customise team formations and individual player positions. Match conditions vary according to the weather, with pitches ranging from dry to wet or frozen. Multiplayer matches support up to four players through a multiplayer adapter.

== Reception ==
Reception

Review scores
Publication	Score
Edge	8/10
Extreme Playstation	94/100
Sega Saturn Magazine	94/100

Edge gave the game a review score of 8/10, praising its "detailed" control system, arguing that "once mastered, individuals should find its passing system can be used to craft an intricate play, with one touch passes and the comprehensive heading possibilities rapidly becoming second nature".

Extreme PlayStation rated the game as 94/100, writing that "it's not instantly accessible, so if you want something to just boot up and play- without using any brain-power, purchase a game with a number and an animal in the title. If you're looking for the ultimate footie simulation that taxes your reflexes, stamina, and grey matter, WLS 98, is da maan!"

Reception of the Saturn version varied considerably across European publications. In the United Kingdom, Sega Saturn Magazine awarded the game 94%, praising its graphics, commentary, artificial intelligence and extensive control system, and described it as the best football simulation then available. Italian magazine Mega Console gave it 85 out of 100 and considered the Saturn edition slightly technically superior to the PlayStation and PC versions, praising its presentation and commentary while criticizing the limited variety of some animations and passages of play. German magazine MAN!AC was less positive, awarding the game 67 out of 100; although it found the action entertaining and noted the available tactical options, it criticised the behaviour of computer-controlled teammates, which could leave the player unsupported. Another German magazine, Sega Magazin, was somewhat more positive, awarding the Saturn version 78%. Reviewer Oliver Preißner praised its commentary and range of game modes, but criticised the inconsistent behaviour of computer-controlled teammates, awkward passing and unimpressive animations. He considered both FIFA 98 and Sega Worldwide Soccer '98 superior football simulations.
