= Silicon Dreams Studio =

British video game developer (1994–2003)

Silicon Dreams Studio Limited
- Formerly: Silicon Dreams (1994–1996)
- Type: Subsidiary
- Industry: Video games
- Founded: March 1994; 32 years ago
- Founder: Geoff Brown
- Defunct: 3 September 2003
- Fate: Liquidation
- Successor: Gusto Games
- Headquarters: Adderbury, England
- Key people: Gavin Cheshire (managing director)
- Number of employees: 55 (2003)
- Parent: CentreGold (1994–1996); Eidos Interactive (1996); Kaboom Studios (1996–2003)

Silicon Dreams Studio Limited was a British video game developer based in Adderbury, England.

== History ==
Silicon Dreams Studio was founded by Geoff Brown in March 1994 as the in-house development team for video game publisher U.S. Gold, also founded by Brown, and became part of the CentreGold umbrella. In April 1996, the entirety of CentreGold (including Silicon Dreams) was acquired by Eidos Interactive for £17.6 million. However, in December 1996, Brown re-acquired a 75% share in the Silicon Dreams label for at least £500,000, and merged it into a new, legally incorporated entity, Silicon Dreams Studio, which became a subsidiary of Geoff Brown Holdings (later renamed Kaboom Studios). In August 2003, Kaboom Studios, facing financial difficulties, closed down sister studio, Attention to Detail, which led media to expect similar to happen to Silicon Dreams Studio. Silicon Dreams Studio entered liquidation on 3 September 2003, laying off all of its 55 employees and cancelling the in-development Urban Freestyle Soccer. A successor to the company, Gusto Games, made up from eleven former Silicon Dreams Studio staff, was announced in October 2003. Gusto Games went on to finish work on Urban Freestyle Soccer, which was released in December 2003.

== Games developed ==
Year	Title	Platform(s)
1996	Olympic Soccer: Atlanta 1996	3DO Interactive Multiplayer, MS-DOS, PlayStation, Sega Saturn
1996	Olympic Games: Atlanta 1996	3DO Interactive Multiplayer, MS-DOS, PlayStation
1997	Soccer '97	PlayStation
1998	Chill	PlayStation
1998	World League Soccer '98	Microsoft Windows, PlayStation, Sega Saturn
1998	Michael Owen's World League Soccer '99	Microsoft Windows, PlayStation
1999	UEFA Champions League Season 1998/99	Microsoft Windows, PlayStation
1999	Sega Worldwide Soccer 2000	Dreamcast
2000	UEFA Champions League Season 1999/2000	PlayStation
2000	Sega Worldwide Soccer 2000: Euro Edition	Dreamcast
2000	Dogs of War	Microsoft Windows
2000	Michael Owen's WLS 2000	Nintendo 64
2000	UEFA Dream Soccer	Dreamcast
2000	UEFA Champions League Season 2000/2001	PlayStation
2001	Lego Island 2: The Brickster's Revenge	Game Boy Advance, Microsoft Windows, PlayStation
2002	UEFA Champions League Season 2001/2002	Microsoft Windows, PlayStation 2
2002	Football Mania	Microsoft Windows, PlayStation 2
2002	Island Xtreme Stunts	Game Boy Advance, Microsoft Windows, PlayStation 2
