= 1999 in video games =

1999 saw many sequels and prequels in video games, such as Heroes of Might and Magic III, System Shock 2, Legacy of Kain: Soul Reaver, Final Fantasy VIII, Age of Empires II, Crash Team Racing, Spyro 2: Ripto's Rage!, Grand Theft Auto 2, Resident Evil 3: Nemesis, Chrono Cross, Unreal Tournament, Pokémon Gold and Silver, and Donkey Kong 64, along with new titles such as Super Smash Bros., Silent Hill, Syphon Filter, Driver, EverQuest, Homeworld, Tony Hawk's Pro Skater, and Planescape: Torment.

The year's most critically acclaimed video game was the Dreamcast title Soulcalibur, which remains among the highest-rated games of all time on Metacritic. The best-selling home video game worldwide was the Game Boy title Pokémon Red/Green/Blue/Yellow for the second year in a row, while the year's highest-grossing arcade game in Japan was Sega's Virtua Striker 2.

== Legend ==
Video game platforms
DC	Dreamcast	GB	Game Boy	GBC	Game Boy Color
GEN	Genesis / Mega Drive	N64	Nintendo 64, iQue Player	NES	Nintendo Entertainment System / Famicom
NGPC	Neo Geo Pocket Color	PS1	PlayStation 1	SAT	Sega Saturn
SNES	Super NES / Super Famicom / Super Comboy	WIN	Windows, all versions Windows 95 and up	WS	WonderSwan

== Hardware ==
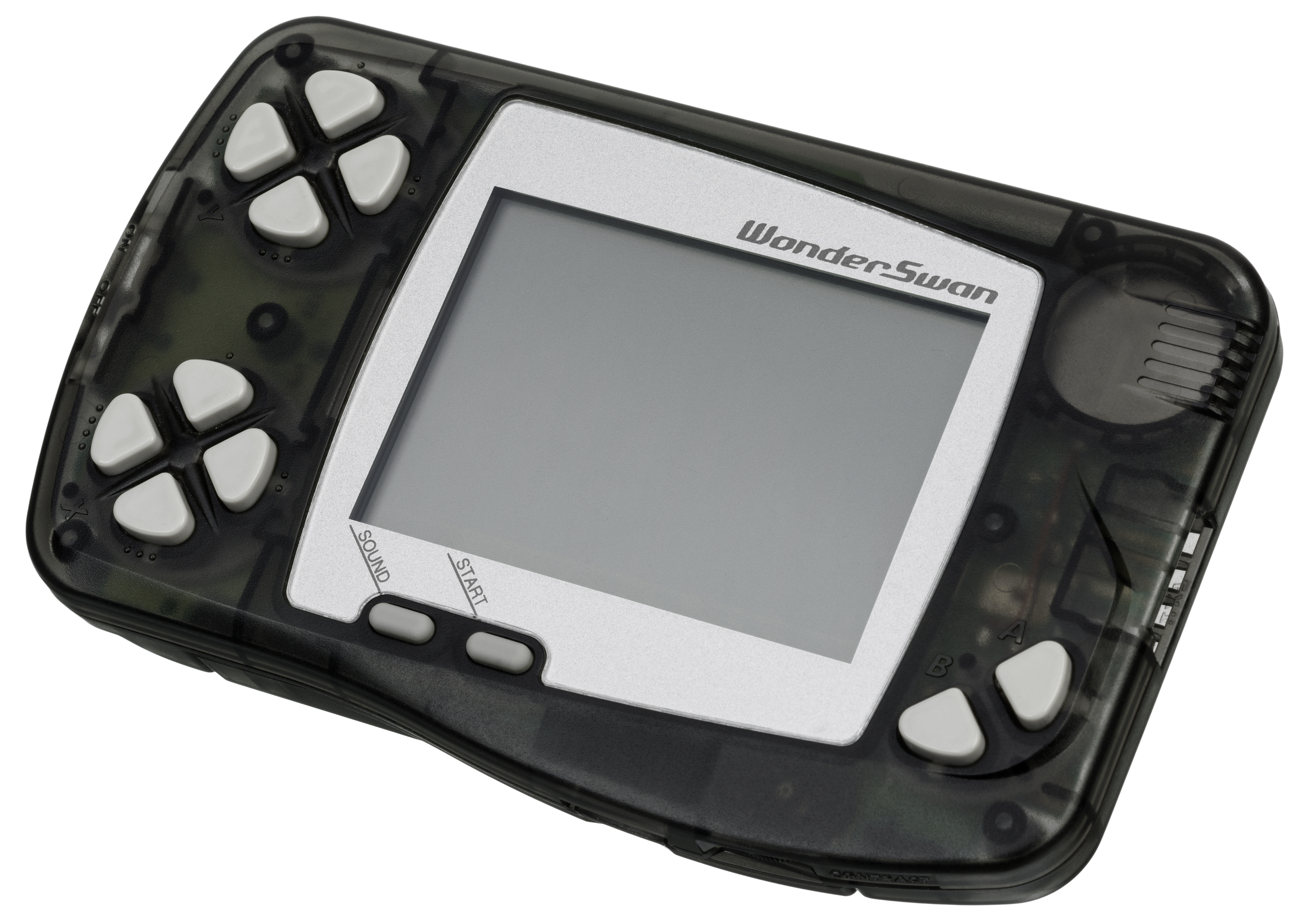
WonderSwan

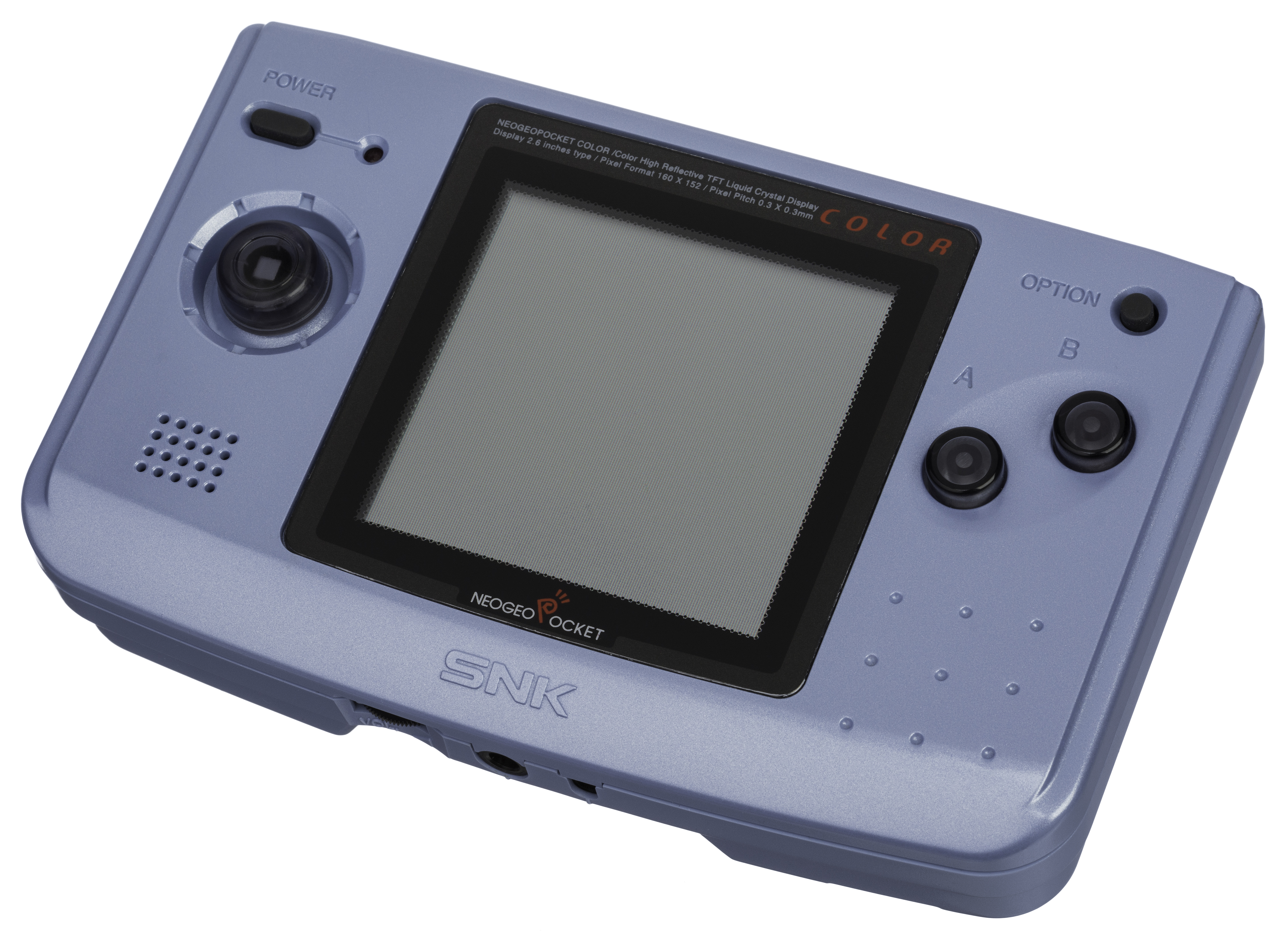
Neo Geo Pocket Color

This is a list of all the game-related hardware released in 1999.

The Sega Dreamcast made its international release after initially launching in Japan the previous year.

Date	System
January 23	PocketStation^{JP}
March 4	WonderSwan^{JP}
March 16	Neo Geo Pocket Color^{JP}
May / June	Game.com Pocket Pro
September 9	Dreamcast^{NA}
October 14	Dreamcast^{EU}
November 30	Dreamcast^{AU}

== Top-rated games ==
=== Game of the Year awards ===
The following titles won Game of the Year awards for 1999.

Awards	Game of the Year	Platform	Publisher	Genre	Ref
Electronic Gaming Monthly (EGM)	Soulcalibur	DC	Namco	Fighting	
GameSpot	Soulcalibur	DC	Namco	Fighting	
Hyper	Soulcalibur	DC	Namco	Fighting	
GamePower	Soulcalibur	DC	Namco	Fighting	
GameSpy	Soulcalibur	DC	Namco	Fighting	
BAFTA Interactive Entertainment Awards	The Legend of Zelda: Ocarina of Time	N64	Nintendo	Action-adventure	
Video Software Dealers Association	The Legend of Zelda: Ocarina of Time	N64	Nintendo	Action-adventure	
Computer Gaming World Premier Awards	Unreal Tournament	WIN	GT Interactive	FPS	
GameSpy	Unreal Tournament	WIN	GT Interactive	FPS	
Digitiser	Pokémon Red / Blue	GB	Nintendo	Role-playing	
Edge	Gran Turismo 2	PS1	Sony	Racing simulation	
Electronic Gaming Monthly (EGM)	Final Fantasy VIII	PS1	Squaresoft	Role-playing	
Game Informer	Tony Hawk's Pro Skater	PS1	Neversoft	Sports	
GameSpot	EverQuest		Sony	MMORPG	
Japan Game Awards	Doko Demo Issyo	PS1	Sony	Strategy	
Japan Media Arts Festival	Seaman	DC	Sega	Simulation	
RPGFan	Chrono Cross	PS1	Squaresoft	RPG	

=== Critically acclaimed titles ===
==== Metacritic and GameRankings ====
Metacritic (MC) and GameRankings (GR) are aggregators of video game journalism reviews.

1999 games and expansions scoring at least 88/100 (MC) or 87.5% (GR)
Game	Publisher	Release Date	Platform(s)	MC score	GR score
Soulcalibur	Namco	August 5, 1999	DC	98/100	96.56%
Chrono Cross	Square	November 18, 1999	PS1	94/100	92.28%
Gran Turismo 2	Sony Computer Entertainment	December 11, 1999	PS1	93/100	92.42%
Tony Hawk's Pro Skater	Activision	September 29, 1999	PS1	92/100	93.67%
Unreal Tournament	GT Interactive	November 22, 1999	WIN	92/100	93.57%
Super Mario Bros. Deluxe	Nintendo	May 10, 1999	GBC	—N/a	92.63%
Homeworld	Sierra Entertainment	September 28, 1999	WIN	93/100	88.81%
System Shock 2	Electronic Arts	August 11, 1999	WIN	92/100	92%
Sid Meier's Alpha Centauri	Electronic Arts	February 12, 1999	WIN	92/100	91.88%
Age of Empires II	Microsoft	September 30, 1999	WIN	92/100	91.81%
Medal of Honor	Electronic Arts	October 31, 1999	PS1	92/100	87.31%
Crash Team Racing	Sony Computer Entertainment	September 30, 1999	PS1	88/100	91.78%
FreeSpace 2	Interplay Entertainment	September 30, 1999	WIN	91/100	91.58%
NFL 2K	Sega	September 9, 1999	DC	—N/a	91.53%
Pokémon Silver Version	Nintendo	November 21, 1999	GBC	—N/a	91.35%
Pokémon Gold Version	Nintendo	November 21, 1999	GBC	—N/a	91.35%
Planescape: Torment	Interplay Entertainment	December 12, 1999	WIN	91/100	90.63%
Resident Evil 3: Nemesis	Capcom	September 22, 1999	PS1	91/100	88.21%
Legacy of Kain: Soul Reaver	Eidos Interactive	August 16, 1999	PS1	91/100	88.16%
The Longest Journey	IQ Media Nordic	November 18, 1999	WIN	91/100	88%
Mario Golf	Nintendo	June 11, 1999	N64	91/100	87.32%
Rayman 2: The Great Escape	Ubisoft	November 5, 1999	WIN	—N/a	90.7%
Ape Escape	Sony Computer Entertainment	May 31, 1999	PS1	90/100	90.44%
Final Fantasy VIII	Square	February 11, 1999	PS1	90/100	89.42%
Beetle Adventure Racing	Electronic Arts	February 28, 1999	N64	90/100	89.1%
Rayman 2: The Great Escape	Ubisoft	October 29, 1999	N64	90/100	88.83%
Syphon Filter	989 Studios	February 17, 1999	PS1	90/100	86.93%
Donkey Kong 64	Nintendo	November 22, 1999	N64	90/100	86.73%
Shenmue	Sega	December 29, 1999	DC	—N/a	89.34%
Wipeout 3	Sony Computer Entertainment	September 8, 1999	PS1	89/100	87.17%
Grandia	Entertainment Software Publishing	June 24, 1999	PS1	89/100	85.87%
Descent 3	Interplay Entertainment	June 17, 1999	WIN	89/100	84.36%
Flight Unlimited III	Electronic Arts	September 17, 1999	WIN	—N/a	88.5%
NBA 2K	Sega	November 10, 1999	DC	—N/a	88.3%
NBA Live 2000	EA Sports	October 31, 1999	WIN	—N/a	88%
Worms Armageddon	Team17	January 29, 1999	WIN	—N/a	87.71%
All-Star Baseball 2000	Acclaim Entertainment	April 8, 1999	N64	—N/a	87.69%
EverQuest	Sony Online Entertainment	March 16, 1999	WIN	85/100	87.68%
Mario Golf	Nintendo	August 10, 1999	GBC	—N/a	87.65%
Driver	GT Interactive	June 25, 1999	PS1	87/100	87.57%
RollerCoaster Tycoon	Hasbro Interactive	March 22, 1999	WIN	—N/a	87.54%

==== Famitsu Platinum Hall of Fame ====
The following video game releases in 1999 entered Famitsu magazine's "Platinum Hall of Fame" for receiving Famitsu scores of at least 35 out of 40.

Title	Platform	Publisher	Genre	Score (out of 40)
Soulcalibur	DC	Namco	Fighting	40
Cyber Troopers Virtual-On Oratorio Tangram	DC	Sega	Shooter	39
Final Fantasy VIII	PS1	Squaresoft	RPG	37
Dragon Quest Characters: Torneko no Daibōken 2	PS1	Enix	Roguelike	37
Sega Rally 2	DC	Sega	Racing	36
Jikkyō Powerful Pro Yakyū 6 (Power Pros 6)	N64	Konami	Sports	36
Biohazard 3: Last Escape (Resident Evil 3: Nemesis)	PS1	Capcom	Survival horror	36
Chrono Cross	PS1	Squaresoft	RPG	36
Um Jammer Lammy	PS1	Sony	Rhythm	35
SaGa Frontier 2	PS1	Squaresoft	RPG	35
Devil Summoner: Soul Hackers	PS1	Atlus	RPG	35
Culdcept Expansion	PS1	Media Factory	Turn-based strategy	35
Fire Emblem: Thracia 776	SNES	Nintendo	SRPG	35

== Financial performance ==
=== Best-selling video game consoles ===
Rank	Manufacturer	Game console	Type	Generation	Sales			
Rank	Manufacturer	Game console	Type	Generation	Japan	United States	Europe	Worldwide
1	Sony	PS1	Home	32-bit	2,570,000	7,040,000	11,750,000	21,820,000
2	Nintendo	GB / GBC	Handheld	8-bit	4,180,000	2,680,000+	Unknown	17,450,000
3	Nintendo	N64	Home	64-bit	940,000	3,538,000	Unknown	6,490,000
4	Sega	DC	Home	128-bit	950,000	1,700,000	500,000+	3,150,000+
5	Bandai	WS	Handheld	16-bit	1,400,000	—N/a	Unknown	1,400,000
6	Sega	GEN	Home	16-bit	—N/a	431,000	Unknown	431,000+
7	Nintendo	SNES	Home	16-bit	30,000	15,000	Unknown	280,000
8	Nintendo	NES	Home	8-bit	50,000	—N/a	—N/a	50,000
9	SNK	NGPC	Handheld	16-bit	Unknown	25,000+	Unknown	25,000+
10	Sega	SAT	Home	32-bit	< 10,000	6,100	Unknown	6,100+

=== Best-selling home video games ===
The following titles were the top ten best-selling home video games (console games or computer games) of 1999 in Japan, the United States, United Kingdom, and Germany.

Best-selling home video games in Japan, United States and Germany
Rank	Title	Platform	Sales				
Rank	Title	Platform	Japan	USA	UK	Germany	Combined
1	Pokémon Red / Green / Blue / Yellow	GB	998,666	8,900,000	Unknown	Unknown	9,898,666+
2	Final Fantasy VIII	PS1	3,538,000	1,000,000+	Unknown	Unknown	4,538,000+
3	Pocket Monsters: Gold / Silver (Pokémon Gold / Silver)	GBC	4,444,000	—N/a	—N/a	—N/a	4,444,000
4	Super Smash Bros. (Dai Rantō Smash Brothers)	N64	1,520,000	1,300,000	Unknown	Unknown	2,820,000+
5	Donkey Kong 64	N64	739,000	1,900,000	Unknown	Unknown	2,639,000+
6	Pokémon Pinball	GBC	765,263	1,800,000	—N/a	—N/a	2,565,263
7	Pokémon Snap	N64	634,000	1,500,000	—N/a	—N/a	2,134,000
8	Dance Dance Revolution / 2ndReMix	PS1	1,904,441 (Note: Dance Dance Revolution sold 1,005,441 units. Dance Dance Revolution 2ndReMix sold 899,000 units.)	Unknown	Unknown	Unknown	1,904,441+
9	Gran Turismo	PS1	234,652	1,300,000	Unknown	100,000+	1,634,652+
10	Driver	PS1	—N/a	1,200,000	200,000+	200,000+	1,600,000+

The following titles were the top ten highest-grossing home video games of 1999 in the United States and Europe.

Highest-grossing home video games in United States and Europe
Rank	Title	Platform(s)	Sales revenue			
Rank	Title	Platform(s)	United States	Europe	Combined	Inflation
1	Pokémon Red / Blue / Yellow	GB	$230,000,000	€60,388,924 ($64,362,515)	$294,000,000	$570,000,000
2	Gran Turismo	PS1	$35,000,000	€94,444,000 ($100,658,000)	$136,000,000	$263,000,000
3	Donkey Kong 64	N64	$110,000,000	€20,561,696 ($21,914,656)	$132,000,000	$255,000,000
4	Tomb Raider III		Unknown	€96,591,106 ($102,946,801)	$102,946,801+	$198,963,304+
5	Driver	PS1	$48,000,000	€43,112,063 ($45,948,837)	$94,000,000	$182,000,000
6	FIFA 99		Unknown	€86,316,959 ($91,996,615)	$91,996,615+	$177,806,632+
7	Final Fantasy VIII	PS1	$50,000,000+	€26,549,294 ($28,296,238)	$78,300,000+	$151,000,000+
8	Pokémon Snap	N64	$75,000,000	—N/a	$75,000,000	$140,000,000
9	The Legend of Zelda: Ocarina of Time	N64	Unknown	€70,023,810 ($74,631,377)	$74,631,377+	$144,238,628+
10	Super Smash Bros.	N64	$66,000,000	Unknown	$66,000,000+	$128,000,000+

==== United States ====
In the United States, the following titles were the top ten best-selling home video games of 1999.

Rank	Title	Platform	Publisher	Genre	Sales	Revenue	Inflation	Ref
1	Pokémon Red / Blue / Yellow	GB	Nintendo	Role-playing	8,900,000	$230,000,000	$440,000,000	
2	Donkey Kong 64	N64	Nintendo	Platformer	1,900,000	$110,000,000	$210,000,000	
3	Pokémon Pinball	GBC	Nintendo	Pinball	1,800,000	$52,000,000	$100,000,000	
4	Pokémon Snap	N64	Nintendo	Photography	1,500,000	$75,000,000	$140,000,000	
5	Super Smash Bros.	N64	Nintendo	Fighting	1,300,000	$66,000,000	$128,000,000	
6	Gran Turismo	PS1	Sony	Racing simulation	1,300,000	$35,000,000	$68,000,000	
7	Driver	PS1	GT Interactive	Driving	1,200,000	$48,000,000	$93,000,000	
8	Spyro the Dragon	PS1	Sony	Platformer	1,200,000	Unknown	Unknown	
9	Final Fantasy VIII	PS1	Square EA	Role-playing	1,000,000+	$50,000,000+	$97,000,000+	
10	Frogger	PS1	Hasbro Interactive	Action	Unknown			

==== Japan ====
In Japan, the following titles were the top ten best-selling home video games of 1999.

Rank	Title	Platform	Sales	First-day sales revenue	Inflation	Ref
1	Pocket Monsters: Gold / Silver (Pokémon Gold / Silver)	GBC	4,444,000	Unknown	Unknown	
2	Final Fantasy VIII	PS1	3,538,000	¥17,200,000,000 ($151,000,000)	$292,000,000	
3	Dance Dance Revolution / 2ndReMix	PS1	1,904,441	Unknown		
4	Nintendo All Star! Dai Rantō Smash Brothers	N64	1,520,000+	Unknown		
5	Biohazard 3: Last Escape (Resident Evil 3: Nemesis)	PS1	1,465,000	Unknown		
6	Gran Turismo 2	PS1	1,410,000	Unknown		
7	Yu-Gi-Oh! Duel Monsters II: Dark duel Stories	GBC	1,208,000	Unknown		
8	Pocket Monsters: Red / Green / Blue / Pikachu (Pokémon)	GB	998,666	Unknown		
9	Derby Stallion '99	PS1	890,000	Unknown		
10	Minna no Golf 2 (Everybody's Golf 2)	PS1	843,000	Unknown		

==== Europe ====
In Europe, the following titles were the top ten highest-grossing home video games of 1999.

Rank	Title	Platform(s)	Publisher	Genre	Sales revenue	Inflation
1	Tomb Raider III		Eidos Interactive	Action-adventure	€96,591,106 ($102,946,801)	$198,963,304
2	Gran Turismo	PS1	Sony	Racing simulation	€94,444,000 ($100,658,000)	$194,540,000
3	FIFA 99		Electronic Arts	Sports	€86,316,959 ($91,996,615)	$177,800,090
4	The Legend of Zelda: Ocarina of Time	N64	Nintendo	Action-adventure	€70,023,810 ($74,631,377)	$144,238,628
5	Pokémon Red / Blue	GB	Nintendo	Role-playing	€60,388,924 ($64,362,515)	$124,392,196
6	Tekken 3	PS1	Namco	Fighting	€57,209,778 ($60,974,181)	$117,843,628
7	Tomb Raider II		Eidos Interactive	Action-adventure	€54,477,514 ($58,062,134)	$112,215,571
8	FIFA 2000		Electronic Arts	Sports	€53,519,616 ($57,041,207)	$110,242,445
9	Colin McRae Rally		Codemasters	Racing	€51,584,666 ($54,978,937)	$106,256,735
10	Driver		GT Interactive	Driving	€43,112,063 ($45,948,837)	$88,804,434

In the United Kingdom, Germany, and France, the following titles were the best-selling home video games of 1999.

Rank	United Kingdom			Germany				France
Rank	Title	Platform(s)	Sales	PS1	Sales	PC	Sales	France
1	FIFA 2000		200,000+	Driver	200,000+	Tiberian Sun	200,000+	Gran Turismo
2	Driver		200,000+	Metal Gear Solid	200,000+	Age of Empires II	200,000+	Unknown
3	Metal Gear Solid	PS1	200,000+	Need for Speed 4	100,000+	Die Siedler III	100,000+	Unknown
4	Gran Turismo	PS1	200,000+	FIFA 99	100,000+	SimCity 3000	100,000+	Unknown
5	Tomb Raider: The Last Revelation		200,000+	Gran Turismo	100,000+	RollerCoaster Tycoon	100,000+	Unknown

==== Australia ====
In Australia, the following titles were the top ten best-selling console games of 1999.

Rank	Title	Platform	Developer	Publisher	Genre
1	Pokémon Red / Blue / Yellow	GB	Game Freak	Nintendo	Role-playing
2	Need for Speed: High Stakes	PS1	EA Canada	Electronic Arts	Racing
3	Gran Turismo (Platinum)	PS1	Polys	Sony	Racing simulation
4	GoldenEye 007	N64	Rare	Nintendo	First-person shooter
5	The Legend of Zelda: Ocarina of Time	N64	Nintendo EAD	Nintendo	Action-adventure
6	Mario Kart 64	N64	Nintendo EAD	Nintendo	Kart racing
7	Super Smash Bros.	N64	HAL Laboratory	Nintendo	Fighting
8	Crash Bandicoot 2 (Platinum)	PS1	Naughty Dog	Sony	Platformer
9	Pokémon Pinball	GBC	Jupiter Corporation	Nintendo	Pinball
10	Pokémon Snap	N64	HAL Laboratory	Nintendo	Photography

=== Highest-grossing arcade games in Japan ===
In Japan, the following titles were the top ten highest-grossing arcade games of 1999.

Rank	Title	Developer	Manufacturer	Type	Genre	Points
1	Virtua Striker 2 ver. 98 / 99	Sega AM2	Sega	Software	Sports	6668
2	Dance Dance Revolution / 2ndMix	Bemani	Konami	Dedicated	Rhythm	5373
3	Street Snap	Hitachi	Towa Japan	Other	Purikura	3934
4	Beatmania CompleteMix / 4thMix	Konami G.M.D.	Konami	Dedicated	Rhythm	3636
5	The House of the Dead 2	Sega AM1	Sega	Dedicated	Light gun shooter	3545
6	Time Crisis 2	Namco	Namco	Dedicated	Light gun shooter	3164
7	Street Fighter Zero 3 (Street Fighter Alpha 3)	Capcom	Capcom	Software	Fighting	2946
8	JoJo's Bizarre Adventure (JoJo's Venture)	Capcom	Capcom	Software	Fighting	2891
9	Super Purikura 21	Atlus	Sega	Other	Purikura	2381
10	Puri Puri Canvas	Konami	Konami	Other	Purikura	2295

== Events ==
- British Academy of Film and Television Arts hosts the 2nd annual BAFTA Interactive Entertainment Awards.
- March – Game Over: How Nintendo Zapped an American Industry, Captured Your Dollars, and Enslaved Your Children is republished as Game Over: Press Start to Continue.
- March 15 – Game Network hosts the 1st annual Independent Games Festival (IGF) at GDC.
- March 15–19 – Game Developers Conference (formerly Computer Game Developers Conference); moves to San Jose, California where it stays for six consecutive years; hosts the 1st annual Independent Games Festival.
- May 12 – Nintendo has started working on what will eventually be the GameCube, under the codename "Project Dolphin".
- May 13 – Academy of Interactive Arts & Sciences hosts 2nd Annual Interactive Achievement Awards (at E3); inducts Sid Meier of Firaxis Games to the AIAS Hall of Fame.
- May 13–15 – 5th annual Electronic Entertainment Expo (E3); the 2nd annual Game Critics Awards for the Best of E3.
- September 7 - The SegaWorld London amusement park shuts down for good exactly three years after its original opening date in 1996. The bottom two floors of the park continue to operate as a generic arcade until 2011.

=== Business ===
- February 22 – Sierra reorganizes to cut costs in what is widely referred to as the "Chainsaw Monday" Layoffs, closing several studios and their iconic former headquarters in Oakhurst, California. Some employees were given the option to relocate to their new headquarters in Bellevue, Washington.
- Midway Games stops using the Atari Games brand.
- New companies: 3d6 Games, 7 Studios, BAM!, Liquid Entertainment, Bohemia Interactive, 7FX

=== Acquisitions ===
- Activision acquires Elsinore Multimedia, Expert Software, and Neversoft Entertainment
- Infogrames Entertainment, SA acquires Accolade (Renamed Infogrames North America), Gremlin Interactive (renamed Infogrames Sheffield House), GT Interactive (GTIS), and Ozisoft
- Take-Two Interactive acquires TalonSoft
- ZeniMax Media acquires Bethesda Softworks
- Codemasters acquires Sensible Software

=== Lawsuits ===
- Nintendo v. Bung Enterprises Ltd.; Nintendo sues Bung over patent infringement
- Sony Corporation v. Bleem LLC

== Notable releases ==
Release	Title	Computer Releases	Console Releases	Handheld Releases	Other Releases
January 15	WCW/nWo Thunder	—N/a	PS1	—N/a	—N/a
January 21	Super Smash Bros.	—N/a	N64	—N/a	—N/a
January 31	Guardian's Crusade	—N/a	PS1	—N/a	—N/a
January 31	Marvel Super Heroes vs. Street Fighter	—N/a	PS1	—N/a	—N/a
January 31	Silent Hill	—N/a	PS1	—N/a	—N/a
January 31	SimCity 3000	WIN, MAC	—N/a	—N/a	—N/a
February 1	WCW Nitro	—N/a	N64	—N/a	—N/a
February 8	Mario Party	—N/a	N64	—N/a	—N/a
February 11	Final Fantasy VIII	—N/a	PS1	—N/a	—N/a
February 12	Sid Meier's Alpha Centauri	WIN	—N/a	—N/a	—N/a
February 13	Power Stone	—N/a	DC	—N/a	Arcade
February 24	Street Sk8er	—N/a	PS1	—N/a	—N/a
February 28	Army Men 3D	—N/a	PS1	—N/a	—N/a
February 28	Beetle Adventure Racing	—N/a	N64	—N/a	—N/a
February 28	Heroes of Might and Magic III	WIN, MAC, LIN	—N/a	—N/a	—N/a
February 28	MLB 2000	—N/a	PS1	—N/a	—N/a
February 28	Star Wars: X-Wing Alliance	WIN	—N/a	—N/a	—N/a
March 1	Gex 3: Deep Cover Gecko	—N/a	PS1, N64	GB	—N/a
March 4	Dungeons and Dragons Collection	—N/a	SAT	—N/a	—N/a
March 4	Pepsiman	—N/a	PS1	—N/a	—N/a
March 15	The King of Fighters '98	—N/a	PS1	—N/a	—N/a
March 16	EverQuest	WIN	—N/a	—N/a	—N/a
March 17	Legend of Legaia	—N/a	PS1	—N/a	—N/a
March 18	UmJammer Lammy	—N/a	PS1	—N/a	—N/a
March 19	King of Fighters R-2	—N/a	—N/a	NGPC	—N/a
March 21	Pokémon Snap	—N/a	N64	—N/a	—N/a
March 22	RollerCoaster Tycoon	WIN	—N/a	—N/a	—N/a
March 24	Need for Speed: High Stakes	WIN	PS1	—N/a	—N/a
March 31	Requiem: Avenging Angel	WIN	—N/a	—N/a	—N/a
April 7	Team Fortress Classic	WIN	—N/a	—N/a	—N/a
April 10	Warzone 2100	WIN	—N/a	—N/a	—N/a
April 30	Ehrgeiz: God Bless the Ring	—N/a	PS1	—N/a	—N/a
April 30	Aliens versus Predator	WIN	—N/a	—N/a	—N/a
April 30	Baldur's Gate: Tales of the Sword Coast	WIN	—N/a	—N/a	—N/a
April 30	Grand Theft Auto: London 1969	WIN	PS1	—N/a	—N/a
April 30	Pokémon Stadium (Japan)	—N/a	N64	—N/a	—N/a
April 30	Super Mario Bros. Deluxe	—N/a	—N/a	GBC	—N/a
May 12	Street Fighter III: 3rd Strike	—N/a	—N/a	—N/a	Arcade
May 18	Midtown Madness	WIN	—N/a	—N/a	—N/a
May 28	Lunar: Silver Star Story Complete	—N/a	PS1	—N/a	—N/a
May 31	Ape Escape	—N/a	PS1	—N/a	—N/a
June 8	Might and Magic VII: For Blood and Honor	WIN	—N/a	—N/a	—N/a
June 19	Counter-Strike	WIN	—N/a	—N/a	—N/a
June 17	Descent 3	WIN, MAC	—N/a	—N/a	—N/a
June 18	Heavy Gear II	WIN	—N/a	—N/a	—N/a
June 24	Persona 2: Innocent Sin	—N/a	PS1	—N/a	—N/a
June 28	Pokémon Pinball	—N/a	—N/a	GBC	—N/a
June 30	Croc 2	—N/a	PS1	—N/a	—N/a
June 30	Driver	WIN	PS1	—N/a	—N/a
July 1	Attack of the Saucerman	WIN	PS1	—N/a	—N/a
July 7	Dungeon Keeper 2	WIN	—N/a	—N/a	—N/a
July 14	Ogre Battle 64: Person of Lordly Caliber (Japan)	—N/a	N64	—N/a	—N/a
July 20	Prince of Persia	—N/a	—N/a	GBC	—N/a
July 22	The King of Fighters '99	—N/a	DC (Evolution)	—N/a	Arcade
July 23	Jagged Alliance 2	WIN	—N/a	—N/a	—N/a
July 26	Mario Golf	—N/a	N64	GBC	—N/a
July 27	NCAA Football 2000	—N/a	PS1	—N/a	—N/a
July 31	Biomotor Unitron	—N/a	—N/a	NGPC	—N/a
July 31	The New Tetris	—N/a	N64	—N/a	—N/a
July 31	Outcast	WIN	—N/a	—N/a	—N/a
July 31	Seven Kingdoms II	WIN	—N/a	—N/a	—N/a
August 11	System Shock 2	WIN	—N/a	—N/a	—N/a
August 12	Syphon Filter	—N/a	PS1	—N/a	—N/a
August 16	Legacy of Kain: Soul Reaver	WIN	PS1	—N/a	—N/a
August 18	Re-Volt	WIN	DC, N64, PS1	—N/a	—N/a
August 27	Command & Conquer: Tiberian Sun	WIN	—N/a	—N/a	—N/a
August 30	Jet Moto 3	—N/a	PS1	—N/a	—N/a
August 31	Shadow Man	WIN	DC, N64, PS1	—N/a	—N/a
August 31	All Star Tennis '99	—N/a	N64, PS1	—N/a	—N/a
August 31	Gauntlet Legends	—N/a	N64	—N/a	—N/a
August 31	Madden NFL 2000	WIN, MAC	PS1, N64	—N/a	—N/a
August 31	Tom Clancy's Rainbow Six: Rogue Spear	WIN	—N/a	—N/a	—N/a
September 1	Tiny Tank: Up Your Arsenal	—N/a	PS1	—N/a	—N/a
September 9	Sonic Adventure	—N/a	DC	—N/a	—N/a
September 9	Soulcalibur	—N/a	DC	—N/a	Arcade
September 17	Flight Unlimited III	WIN	—N/a	—N/a	—N/a
September 22	Resident Evil 3: Nemesis	—N/a	PS1	—N/a	—N/a
September 28	Homeworld	WIN	—N/a	—N/a	—N/a
September 28	Kingsley's Adventure	—N/a	PS1	—N/a	—N/a
September 29	Tony Hawk's Pro Skater	—N/a	PS1	—N/a	—N/a
September 30	Age of Empires II: The Age of Kings	WIN	—N/a	—N/a	—N/a
September 30	Crash Team Racing	—N/a	PS1	—N/a	—N/a
September 30	Final Fantasy VI	—N/a	PS1	—N/a	—N/a
September 30	Freespace 2	WIN	—N/a	—N/a	—N/a
September 30	Pac-Man World	—N/a	PS1	—N/a	—N/a
October 4	Disciples: Sacred Lands	WIN	—N/a	—N/a	—N/a
October 11	Jet Force Gemini	—N/a	N64	—N/a	—N/a
October 16	Dead or Alive 2	—N/a	—N/a	—N/a	Arcade
October 19	Pokémon Yellow: Special Pikachu Edition (North America)	—N/a	—N/a	GB, GBC	—N/a
October 22	Grand Theft Auto 2	WIN	PS1	—N/a	—N/a
October 29	Rayman 2: The Great Escape	WIN	DC, N64	—N/a	—N/a
October 31	Ballistic	—N/a	PS1	GBC	—N/a
October 31	Pharaoh	WIN	—N/a	—N/a	—N/a
October 31	Nocturne	WIN	—N/a	—N/a	—N/a
October 31	Septerra Core	WIN	—N/a	—N/a	—N/a
October 31	The Nomad Soul	WIN	—N/a	—N/a	—N/a
October 31	South Park: Chef's Luv Shack	WIN	DC, N64, PS1	—N/a	—N/a
November 2	Spyro 2: Ripto's Rage!	—N/a	PS1	—N/a	—N/a
November 2	Asheron's Call	WIN	—N/a	—N/a	—N/a
November 3	Sim Theme Park	WIN	—N/a	—N/a	—N/a
November 10	Half-Life: Opposing Force	WIN	—N/a	—N/a	—N/a
November 10	Rippin' Riders Snowboarding	—N/a	DC	—N/a	—N/a
November 11	Medal of Honor	—N/a	PS1	—N/a	—N/a
November 11	Age of Wonders	WIN	—N/a	—N/a	—N/a
November 13	Nancy Drew: Stay Tuned for Danger	WIN	—N/a	—N/a	—N/a
November 15	Indiana Jones and the Infernal Machine	WIN	—N/a	—N/a	—N/a
November 16	Tomorrow Never Dies	—N/a	PS1	—N/a	—N/a
November 16	Toy Story 2: Buzz Lightyear to the Rescue	—N/a	PS1, N64	—N/a	—N/a
November 18	Chrono Cross (Japan)	—N/a	PS1	—N/a	—N/a
November 19	Gabriel Knight 3: Blood of the Sacred, Blood of the Damned	WIN	—N/a	—N/a	—N/a
November 19	The Longest Journey	WIN	—N/a	—N/a	—N/a
November 21	Pokémon Gold and Silver (Japan)	—N/a	—N/a	GBC	—N/a
November 22	Tomb Raider: The Last Revelation	WIN	PS1	—N/a	—N/a
November 22	Unreal Tournament	WIN	—N/a	—N/a	—N/a
November 23	Dark Arms: Beast Busters	—N/a	—N/a	NGPC	—N/a
November 23	SWAT 3: Close Quarters Battle	WIN	—N/a	—N/a	—N/a
November 24	Donkey Kong 64	—N/a	N64	—N/a	—N/a
November 24	Ultima IX: Ascension	WIN	—N/a	—N/a	—N/a
November 26	Garou: Mark of the Wolves	—N/a	—N/a	—N/a	Arcade
November 30	South Park Rally	WIN	PS1	—N/a	—N/a
December 2	The Legend of Dragoon (Japan)	—N/a	PS1	—N/a	—N/a
December 2	Quake III Arena	WIN, LIN	DC	—N/a	—N/a
December 10	Urban Chaos	WIN	—N/a	—N/a	—N/a
December 11	Gran Turismo 2	—N/a	PS1	—N/a	—N/a
December 12	Planescape: Torment	WIN	—N/a	—N/a	—N/a
December 17	Mario Party 2 (Japan)	—N/a	N64	—N/a	—N/a
December 20	Crusaders of Might and Magic	WIN	—N/a	—N/a	—N/a
December 20	Sonic the Hedgehog Pocket Adventure	—N/a	—N/a	NGPC	—N/a
December 22	Harvest Moon 64	—N/a	N64	—N/a	—N/a
December 22	Valkyrie Profile	—N/a	PS1	—N/a	—N/a
December 29	Shenmue	—N/a	DC	—N/a	—N/a
December 30	Battlezone II: Combat Commander	WIN	—N/a	—N/a	—N/a
December 31	Zombie Revenge	—N/a	DC	—N/a	—N/a

== See also ==
- 1999 in games
