= Virtua Striker 2 =

1997 video game

- Japanese Dreamcast box art
- Developer: Sega AM2 (Note: Dreamcast version developed by Genki.)
- Publisher: Sega
- Director: Satoshi Mifune
- Producers: Yu Suzuki; Satoshi Mifune
- Designer: Kaori Yamamoto
- Composers: Hideaki Miyamoto; Fumio Ito
- Series: Virtua Striker
- Platforms: Arcade, Dreamcast
- Release: Arcade; June 1997; Dreamcast: JP: December 2, 1999; EU: February 29, 2000; NA: March 14, 2000
- Genre: Sports
- Modes: Single-player, multiplayer
- Arcade system: Sega Model 3

Virtua Striker 2 (バーチャストライカー 2, Bācha Sutoraikā Tsū) is a sports video game developed and published by Sega for arcades in 1997. It is the sequel to the 1994 video game Virtua Striker, and the second game in the Virtua Striker series. A series of updates was released from 1998 to 1999, starting with Virtua Striker 2 ver. 1998 and ending with Virtua Striker 2 ver. 2000.1 (バーチャストライカー2 ver.2000.1, Bācha Sutoraikā Tsū ver.2000.1), that latest update being released for the Dreamcast in Japan in 1999, and then internationally in 2000, with the North American version re-titled to Virtua Striker 2. A sequel, Virtua Striker 3, was released in 2001.

The arcade game was a major success in Japan, where it was the second highest-grossing arcade game of 1998 and the overall highest-grossing arcade game of 1999. The Dreamcast version, however, received mixed reviews from critics.

== Gameplay ==
Virtua Striker 2 is an arcade-style association football game designed around a simplified control system. Players can perform short and long passes, shoot, and tackle, while the game automatically selects the player being controlled. The game uses a fixed sideline camera and emphasizes fast-paced play rather than the more detailed simulation approach of contemporary football games.

The Dreamcast version includes arcade, versus and tournament-style modes. It also introduced an International Cup mode, the ability to save replays to the VMU, and team formation options. Yellow and red cards, which were absent from the arcade game, were also implemented in the home version. The International Cup mode allows players to adjust match durations, with halves lasting up to 15 minutes, and features both group-stage and knockout competitions. The Dreamcast version also includes more than ten stadiums, incorporating new venues alongside stadiums from earlier versions of the game.

== Development and release ==
Virtua Striker 2 was developed by Sega AM2 as a sequel to Virtua Striker and originally released on Sega's Model 3 arcade hardware in 1997. The game subsequently received a series of updated arcade releases. For the Dreamcast version, titled Virtua Striker 2 ver. 2000.1 in Japan and Europe, Sega adapted the arcade game for home play and added additional modes and features.

As part of the game's promotion in the United Kingdom, Sega held a launch event at Arsenal's training ground in London on 17 January 2000, where Arsenal players Thierry Henry and Dennis Bergkamp played Virtua Striker 2 on the Dreamcast. In France, Dreamcast: Le Magazine Officiel arranged for AS Saint-Étienne footballers Stéphane Pédron and Julien Sablé to play Virtua Striker 2 at the Stade Geoffroy-Guichard. Pédron praised the game's accessible controls, while Sablé complimented its graphics and the recognisability of the footballers.

The Dreamcast conversion also generated anticipation in Italy. GameSurf recalled that, following the console's launch, one of the questions it was most frequently asked was when a Virtua Striker game would appear for the system, describing Virtua Striker 2 as one of Sega's most widely played arcade football games. Sega promoted the Dreamcast version in Germany through localized print advertising that emphasized the game's arcade realism and demanding passing system, incorporating quotations from the German magazine Video Games.

In Spain, Sega promoted the Dreamcast version with an official presentation for the specialist press at the Santiago Bernabéu Stadium shortly before a match between Real Madrid and Mallorca. The Spanish Revista Oficial Dreamcast reported that Sega considered the title an important release and supported it with an advertising campaign costing approximately 100 million pesetas. Also in Spain, Sega organised a promotional competition for Virtua Striker 2 through its Dreamarena online service, offering a trip for two to London to attend the UEFA Cup quarter-final between Arsenal and Deportivo de La Coruña at Highbury on 2 March 2000. Entrants were required to answer three questions about the game.

== Reception ==
Reception

Aggregate score
Aggregator	Score
GameRankings	53%

Review scores
Publication	Score
AllGame	2/5
CNET Gamecenter	2/10
Computer and Video Games	5/5
Electronic Gaming Monthly	4/10 (Note: In Electronic Gaming Monthly's review of the Dreamcast version, one critic gave it 3.5/10, two others gave it each a score of 4/10, and another gave it 4.5/10.)
EP Daily	1/10
Famitsu	33/40
Game Informer	(ARC) 7.5/10 (DC) 5.25/10
GameFan	(F.M.) 91% 89% (Note: In GameFan's viewpoint of the Dreamcast version, one critic gave it 88, and the other 90.)
GameRevolution	D−
GameSpot	4.7/10
GameSpy	7.5/10
IGN	(JP) 6.5/10 (US) 4.1/10
Next Generation	2/5
USA Today	3.5/4

=== Arcade ===
In Japan, Virtua Striker 2 was a major commercial success in arcades. Game Machine ranked Virtua Striker 2 and Virtua Striker 2 Ver. 98 collectively as the second highest-grossing arcade software of 1998, behind Tekken 3. The following year, Virtua Striker 2 Ver. 99 was the highest-grossing arcade software title in Japan, while Ver. 98 ranked fourth. Game Machine also noted that Virtua Striker 2 Ver. 2000 had entered its annual rankings despite having been available for only three and a half months, citing this as evidence of the series' popularity.

=== Dreamcast ===
The Dreamcast version received mixed reviews according to the review aggregation website GameRankings. In Japan, Famitsu gave it a score of 33 out of 40. In North America, Rob Smolka of NextGen said that the game "may look good, but the poor controls drag this one down to rental status." Jake The Snake of GamePro said, "With its dazzling graphics and a speedy but authentic action, Virtua Striker 2 is at least a weekend rental for any soccer fan with a Dreamcast or for anyone who enjoys a fun, great-looking game." (Note: GamePro gave the Dreamcast version 4.5/5 for graphics, 3.5/5 for sound, and two 4/5 scores for control and fun factor.)

Reception in Europe was mixed. In the United Kingdom, Computer and Video Games said the arcade gameplay "will initially dismay" International Superstar Soccer (ISS) fans, but that it is not a "simulation, it's a full-on arcade game." They called it "the finest arcade football game ever" and said, though some might criticise the lack of depth, "the massive andrenaline rush you get" from playing "more than compensates." They compared it to Crazy Taxi, in that both provide "instant" fun gaming. French magazine Dreamzone praised Virtua Striker 2 as an enjoyable arcade-style football game, recommending it to players seeking an experience similar to the arcade original while considering it less suitable for those wanting a deeper football simulation. German magazine MAN!AC was considerably more critical, awarding the game 67 out of 100. Although praising its visual presentation, the magazine criticised its controls, artificial intelligence and limited depth, regarding it as inferior to more simulation-oriented football games.

Italian magazine Console Mania awarded Virtua Striker 2 Ver. 2000.1 75 out of 100. The magazine praised its graphics, sound and immediate playability, but considered its longevity and overall depth more limited. Spanish magazine Revista Oficial Dreamcast gave the game 8 out of 10, praising its graphics and arcade-style action while considering its gameplay in need of improvement and noting several limitations compared with more comprehensive football simulations.

In the United Kingdom, Virtua Striker 2 performed strongly on the Dreamcast sales charts. For the week ending 19 February 2000, it ranked third on the Chart-Track Dreamcast chart, having placed second the previous week. Official Dreamcast Magazine described the game as continuing a "strong showing" on the chart. It also ranked second on retailer HMV's Dreamcast sales chart. In April 2000, the Spanish Revista Oficial Dreamcast reported that Virtua Striker 2 ranked second among the best-selling Dreamcast games at Centro Mail, behind Crazy Taxi. The game sold 239,511 in Japan and 47,836 in the United States. In Brazil, Virtua Striker 2 ranked ninth among Tec Toy's best-selling Dreamcast games, according to a company sales study published by UOL in 2004.

== Legacy ==
Virtua Striker 2 had an extended life in arcades, receiving several updated editions including Virtua Striker 2 ver. '98, ver. '99 and ver. 2000 before the series continued with Virtua Striker 3. By January 2000, arcade trade publication Star Tech Journal reported that the game had achieved solid circulation in most major gaming territories outside the United States.

In Italy, Everyeye retrospectively described Virtua Striker 2 as a fixture of the country's late-1990s arcade scene, recalling its widespread presence in bars, amusement arcades and seaside establishments.

The game continued to receive retrospective attention after the end of the Dreamcast era. In 2010, GamesRadar included it among twenty Dreamcast games the publication wanted to see re-released digitally, highlighting its arcade gameplay and goal-rating system. The publication later selected it again among its most-wanted games for Sega's Sega Forever service.
