= Virtua Striker =

- Arcade flyer for the first game
- Genre: Sports (association football)
- Developers: Sega AM2, Amusement Vision, Sega
- Publisher: Sega
- Platforms: Arcade, Dreamcast, GameCube, PlayStation 3, Xbox 360
- First release: Virtua Striker; May 1995
- Latest release: Virtua Striker (Model 2 Collection ports); 13 February 2013

Virtua Striker (Note: Japanese: バーチャストライカー, Hepburn: Bācha Sutoraikā) is a series of association football video games published by Sega, primarily for arcades. The series originated at Sega AM2; later entries were developed by Amusement Vision.

The original Virtua Striker was released in May 1995. It used three-dimensional, texture-mapped graphics and was promoted by Sega as the first 3D computer-graphics football game.

Three main games received home-console versions: Virtua Striker 2 ver. 2000.1 for the Dreamcast, Virtua Striker 3 ver. 2002 for the GameCube, and the original Virtua Striker for the PlayStation 3 and Xbox 360. The latter ports were released in Japan on 13 February 2013 as part of Sega's Model 2 Collection.

== History ==
Virtua Striker began after Yu Suzuki suggested that Satoshi Mifune make a football game. Mifune had previously worked on Sega arcade games including Space Harrier, Out Run and After Burner. Hiroyuki Nakagomi joined the small development team from the Daytona USA project. In a 2018 interview, Mifune recalled that the team wanted to encourage competitive two-player matches, having observed that customers often played other football games alone while their friends watched. Sega's sales staff doubted the project's commercial prospects, but the team persuaded Suzuki to allow a location test. The test, held at the Ikebukuro GiGO arcade, was successful and development continued. In mainland China, Sega's Shanghai First Department Store arcade organised competitions featuring Virtua Striker, with staff providing live commentary to attract spectators. Former arcade manager Chen Jiaye recalled that football and racing games were particularly suitable for such events because their rules were familiar to the general public.

Virtua Striker 2 followed in June 1997. Its ver. '98 and ver. '99 updates appeared in May and December 1998, respectively. Ver. 2000 moved the series from Model 3 to NAOMI hardware in 1999, before the Dreamcast adaptation ver. 2000.1.

Virtua Striker 3 was released for NAOMI 2 in April 2001. The GameCube edition, Virtua Striker 3 ver. 2002, followed in 2002. A separate arcade release, Virtua Striker 2002, used Triforce hardware; its developers described it as the first Triforce game. Virtua Striker 4 followed in 2004 and received the ver. 2006 update in 2006.

== Releases and revisions ==
The tables distinguish named releases, home-console localizations, and documented arcade software revisions. Systems shown are the original official release platforms. Undated means that a separate public release date has not been established. Dates marked with an asterisk are software dates recorded in preservation documentation, rather than confirmed public release dates. Some catalogue entries have not been archived; these are identified as catalogued only.

=== Virtua Striker (1995) ===
Original game, revision and home-console ports
| Release or revision | System | Date | Edition or notes |
|---|---|---|---|
| Virtua Striker | Arcade — Model 2B | May 1995 | Original release |
| Revision A | Arcade — Model 2B | Undated | ROM revision |
| Virtua Striker (Model 2 Collection) | PlayStation 3 — PlayStation Network | 2013-02-13 | Japan |
| Virtua Striker (Model 2 Collection) | Xbox 360 — Xbox Live Arcade | 2013-02-13 | Japan |

=== Virtua Striker 2 (1997) ===
Virtua Striker 2 releases and updates
| Release or revision | System | Date | Edition or notes |
|---|---|---|---|
| Virtua Striker 2 | Arcade — Model 3, Step 1.5 and Step 2.0 | June 1997 | Original release |
| Virtua Striker 2 ver. '98 | Arcade — Model 3, Step 1.5 and Step 2.0 | May 1998 | Updated edition |
| Virtua Striker 2 ver. '99 | Arcade — Model 3, Step 1.5 and Step 2.x (Note: The Step 2 hardware designation differs between preservation projects: MAME describes these ver. '99 and ver. '99.1 sets as Step 2.0, while Supermodel identifies the same sets as Step 2.1. Step 2.x preserves that uncertainty without implying that each designation represents a separate release.) | December 1998 | Updated edition |
| Ver. '99 — Revision A | Arcade — Model 3, Step 2.x | Undated | Export/USA |
| Virtua Striker 2 ver. '99.1 — Revision B | Arcade — Model 3, Step 1.5 and Step 2.x | Undated (Note: MAME catalogues Revision B under 1998 and Supermodel under 1999. A separate public release date for the named ver. '99.1 update has not been established from publisher documentation.) | Japan and Export/USA; separate regional ROMs |
| Virtua Striker 2 ver. 2000 | Arcade — NAOMI | 1999 | Updated edition; Sega dates it to July 1999. (Note: Sega's retrospective catalogue gives July 1999 for ver. 2000, while Game Machine reported shipment in August 1999. The year is undisputed; the sources differ on the month.) |
| Ver. 2000 — earlier cartridge revision | Arcade — NAOMI | 1999-07-01* | Revision letter uncertain; may be A or B |
| Ver. 2000 — Revision C | Arcade — NAOMI | 1999-07-27* | Cartridge revision |
| Virtua Striker 2 ver. 2000.1 | Dreamcast | 1999-12-02 (Japan); 2000 (Europe) | Home-console adaptation |
| Virtua Striker 2 (North American edition) | Dreamcast | 2000 | Localized title of ver. 2000.1 |

MAME also records a Japanese Virtua Striker 2 test/debug build on Model 3 Step 1.5. Its commercial release status is uncertain.

=== Virtua Striker 3 (2001) and Virtua Striker 2002 ===
Arcade, GameCube and Triforce editions
| Release or revision | System | Date | Edition or notes |
|---|---|---|---|
| Virtua Striker 3 | Arcade — NAOMI 2 | April 2001 | GD-ROM (GDS-0006) and World cartridge editions |
| Revision B — World cartridge | Arcade — NAOMI 2 | Undated | Cartridge revision |
| Virtua Striker 3 ver. 2002 | GameCube | 2002-02-14 (Japan); 2002-05-24 (Europe) | Home-console adaptation |
| Virtua Striker 2002 (North American edition) | GameCube | 2002-05-20 | Localized title of Virtua Striker 3 ver. 2002 |
| Virtua Striker 2002 — Japan | Arcade — Triforce | 2002 | GD-ROM: GDT-0001 |
| Virtua Striker 2002 — Export | Arcade — Triforce | 2002 | GD-ROM: GDT-0002 |
| Virtua Striker 2002 — Type 3 | Arcade — Triforce Type 3 | 2004 | GD-ROM: GDT-0012 |

The title Virtua Striker 2002 therefore identifies both the North American GameCube localization and a separate Triforce arcade game. MAME also lists the arcade media identifier MDA-G0014, with its year and territory unresolved.

=== Virtua Striker 4 (2004) ===
Sega dates the Japanese launch of Virtua Striker 4 to November 2004 and ver. 2006 to May 2006. Both use Triforce arcade hardware.

Documented Virtua Striker 4 software editions
| Release or revision | System | Date | Edition or notes |
Virtua Striker 4 — regional editions and revisions
| Japan — original | Triforce | Undated | GDT-0013; catalogued only |
| Japan — Revision A | Triforce | Undated | GDT-0013A; catalogued only |
| Japan — Revision B | Triforce | Undated | GDT-0013B; catalogued only |
| Japan — Revision C | Triforce | 2004-09-13* | GDT-0013C |
| Japan — Revision D | Triforce | Undated | GDT-0013D; catalogued only |
| Japan — Revision E | Triforce | 2005-02-17* | GDT-0013E |
| Asia — original | Triforce | 2004-12-03* | GDT-0014 |
| Asia — Revision A | Triforce | Undated | GDT-0014A; catalogued only |
| Asia — Revision B | Triforce | 2005-05-23* | GDT-0014B |
| Export — original | Triforce | 2004-12-02* | GDT-0015 |
| Export — Revision A | Triforce | 2005-04-11* | GDT-0015A |
| Export — CompactFlash edition | Triforce | 2004-12-02* | MDA-G0016; catalogued only |
Virtua Striker 4 ver. 2006 — regional editions and revisions
| Japan — original | Triforce | Undated | GDT-0020; catalogued only |
| Japan — Revision A | Triforce | Undated | GDT-0020A; catalogued only |
| Japan — Revision B | Triforce | 2006-04-25* | GDT-0020B |
| Japan — Revision C | Triforce | Undated | GDT-0020C; catalogued only |
| Japan — Revision D | Triforce | 2006-10-19* | GDT-0020D |
| Export — original | Triforce | 2006-01-31* | GDT-0021 |
| Export — CompactFlash edition | Triforce | Undated | Media ID unresolved; catalogued only |

The lettered revisions are software builds of the relevant regional edition; they are not separately numbered sequels. Their recorded software dates do not establish when a particular update reached arcades. (Note: For example, the recorded software date for Japanese Virtua Striker 4 Revision C precedes Sega's stated November 2004 launch. These dates should not be substituted for public release dates.)

=== Related minigame ===
Sega Superstars (2004) includes an EyeToy minigame based on Virtua Striker for the PlayStation 2. It is a minigame adaptation rather than a port of a complete Virtua Striker arcade game.

== Gameplay ==
The early arcade games use an eight-way joystick and three action buttons: short pass, long pass and shoot. The short-pass button performs a sliding tackle when the player's team does not have possession. Actions also depend on the position of the ball and the players; for example, the long-pass button can produce a cross, while a shot can become a header or a volley. Holding the shoot button charges the shot.

The original game has a single-player knockout tournament and competitive two-player play. Its published instructions state that a draw ends the game, so extra time and penalty shootouts should not be treated as rules common to every title. Virtua Striker 2 introduced a tactical switching system, operated with the Start button.

The number of selectable national teams changes between releases. The original game has 18, Virtua Striker 2 has 24, ver. '99 has 27, and ver. 2000 has 32. Virtua Striker 3 also has 32 national teams, while the GameCube ver. 2002 and Triforce Virtua Striker 2002 expand the selection to 64.

Virtua Striker 3 introduced offside decisions and yellow and red cards to the arcade series. The Dreamcast ver. 2000.1 already included these rules in its International Cup mode, which combines a group stage with knockout matches. The GameCube edition adds player editing and the Road to International Cup team-development mode.

Virtua Striker 4 uses an analog stick, four action buttons and three tactical buttons. It also adds an IC-card system and supports Sega's ALL.Net infrastructure. Its VS.NET service allowed players to customize formations, tactics, team members and created players through a computer or mobile phone.

=== Teams in the original game ===
The 18 national teams in the original Virtua Striker are listed below.

| Region | National teams |
|---|---|
| Africa | Nigeria |
| Asia | Japan, Saudi Arabia, South Korea |
| Europe | Bulgaria, Denmark, England, France, Germany, Italy, Netherlands, Spain, Sweden |
| North America | Mexico, United States |
| South America | Argentina, Brazil, Colombia |

=== Hidden teams ===
The series includes hidden teams. Virtua Striker 2 features FC Sega and MVP Yuki Chan. Sega's documentation for ver. 2000 also lists Royal Genki among its hidden teams. FC Sega represents the developers. The GameCube Virtua Striker 3 ver. 2002 includes FC Sonic, featuring Sonic and Chao, and Yukichan United.

== Reception ==
In Japan, Game Machine ranked the original Virtua Striker second in its video-game software chart and first in its dedicated-video-game chart in the 15 July 1995 issue.

Next Generation awarded the original game four out of five stars, praising its controls, player animation, camera and texture-mapped graphics.

Virtua Striker 2, including ver. '98, placed second in Game Machine's annual software chart for 1998, behind Tekken 3. Its ver. '99 update topped the corresponding chart for 1999, while ver. '98 placed fourth.

== See also ==
- Virtua Pro Football
