= Virtua Pro Football =

2006 video game

- PAL region cover art
- Developer: Smilebit
- Publisher: Sega
- Platform: PlayStation 2
- Release: JP: June 1, 2006; EU: September 1, 2006
- Genre: Football simulation
- Modes: Single-player; Multiplayer

Virtua Pro Football, known in Japan as World Football Climax (ワールド フットボール クライマックス), is a PlayStation 2 football simulation video game, released by Sega in 2006.

== Gameplay ==
The game featured a rock-paper-scissors like system for both 1-on-1 situations, and set pieces. It also had a player career mode which allowed completed players to be exported to Let's Make a Soccer Team! for use as youth players, as well as importing teams from the game to use in games and custom competitions.

== Trivia ==
The former Italian footballer Roberto Baggio endorsed the Japanese version, having appeared in the TV commercial, flyer and merchandising.

== Reception ==
PALGN gave a score of 5.5 out of 10 and concluded that "[...] the game simply up can't match other titles available on the market." PSX Extreme gave a score of 6+ out of 10 and complimented the quantity of available teams but said the game feels like a copy of Pro Evolution Soccer and the gameplay is too buggy. PlayStation Official Magazine – UK called the game a "dated, derivative effort". In a retrospective, Retro Hobby called it an "excellent football simulator".

== See also ==
- Let's Make a Soccer Team!, a sister title by Sega which used the same engine.
- Virtua Striker, similarly titled football series by Sega
