= Let's Make a Soccer Team! =

2006 video game

- European cover art
- Developer: Sega
- Publisher: Sega
- Series: Pro Soccer Club o Tsukurō!
- Platform: PlayStation 2
- Release: JP: March 29, 2006; EU: August 25, 2006
- Genre: Football Management
- Modes: Single-player, multiplayer

Let's Make a Soccer Team!, known in Japan as Pro Soccer Club o Tsukurō! Europe Championship (プロサッカークラブをつくろう！ヨーロッパチャンピオンシップ), is a 2006 football management simulation video game developed by Smilebit and published by Sega for the PlayStation 2. Until the worldwide release of SEGA Pocket Club Manager on Android and iOS in May 2018, it was the only game in the Pro Soccer Club o Tsukurō! (SakaTsuku for short) series to be localised for the Western market, and until the multi-platform global release of SEGA Football Club Champions in January 2026, was the only game in the series to be released on home consoles outside Japan.

== Gameplay ==
Let's Make A Soccer Team featured a 3D match engine using assets from Virtua Pro Football.

Let's Make a Soccer Team! has heavy role-playing video game elements, with a running story and characters alongside the game's management side. Unlike in other football management titles, the player is the chairperson and founder of the club, and has a job similar to a director of football. The game features 439 real, mostly unlicensed club teams from all over the world, with real rosters covered by the FIFPRO license, unlicensed versions of the UEFA club tournaments, and a handful of fictional friendly tournaments.

In total there are six playable leagues: England, France, Germany, Italy, Spain, and the Netherlands, all based in the 2005-06 season. While players can create teams based in the Home Nations of Wales, Scotland, and Northern Ireland; as well as in Monaco, they will still play in the English and French league systems, respectively. Of the six leagues, only the Spanish and Dutch leagues are fully licensed, while Italy is mostly licensed, with Palermo, Siena, and Cagliari being unlicensed Serie A teams. Six Serie B teams and the Italian leagues themselves are unlicensed as well. The game also has official licensing from Juventus, with the Stadio Delle Alpi being used when Juventus is playing at home.

In addition, the game provides a Versus Mode, which allows players to choose all 439 real club teams and all in-game national teams to simulate (but not manage) friendly matches and custom tournaments.

=== Virtua Pro Football integration ===
Teams created in the main game may be imported to Virtua Pro Football for use in custom games, leagues, and tournaments. Players from a completed career mode of VPF can also be imported into LMAST as youth players.

== Plot ==
Let's Make a Soccer Team!'s story begins with a brief introduction concerning the history of football. After this, the player is then led to creating their own football club. Following this, the game slides a series of newspaper headlines, chronicling the formation of the player's team and its rise to the third tier of the respective country's league system. It also introduces the main antagonist, a local-born business tycoon who plans to take over and merge a football club into his conglomerate, Big Bang Konzern.

The game's playoffs to the second tier and first pre-season acts as a tutorial, which continues until most features are unlocked in August of the 2006–07 season, the first fully playable season. If the player's club is knocked out of the initial playoffs, they trigger an early game over as the tycoon buys your club. Otherwise, the rival buys a different club from the same hometown who earned automatic promotion and begins a local rivalry which lasts for the rest of the game, forming the main thread of the story.

== Development and release ==
The game's European localisation was vastly different from the original version, despite the text already having been translated into English.

Roberto Baggio appeared in promotional commercials for the game in Japan, as well as on a limited edition cover for pre-orders and a cross-promotion with Sega's World Club Champion Football.

== Reception ==
When Let's Make a Soccer Team! was first released, critical reception to the game was generally unfavourable, with a 44 rating on Metacritic shortly after release, and 49% critic rating on MobyGames, with many English-speaking reviewers criticising the match engine and lack of depth.
