= Attack of the Saucerman =

1999 video game

- Developer: Fube Industries
- Publisher: Psygnosis
- Platforms: PlayStation, Windows
- Release: PlayStation: UK: July 16, 1999; Windows; 1999
- Genre: Action-adventure
- Mode: Single-player

Attack of the Saucerman is an action game developed by Fube Industries and published by Psygnosis for the PlayStation console and Microsoft Windows in 1999.

This was the last PlayStation game Psygnosis published as a third-party, before being merged into Sony as a whole.

== Reception ==
PC Gamer gave it a score of 29% and said:

This is basically a myopic, small scale shooter: control is slow and slightly kludgy, but it doesn't affect aiming much, because you can't look up or down, and your guns aim automatically at targets above or below you. AI consists of enemies running straight toward you and firing. All in all, it's a mind-numbing experience not worth your time or money.
