= List of Interplay games =

Interplay Entertainment is an American video game developer and publisher. The company was founded in 1983 by former Boone Corporation colleagues Brian Fargo, Troy Worrell, Jay Patel, and Rebecca Heineman, as well as an investor and University of California, Irvine, teacher named Chris Wells, and adopted Interplay Productions as its original company name two years later. As a developer, it produced several graphic adventure games for Activision to publish, but its first major hit was The Bard's Tale in 1985, a role-playing game published by Electronic Arts. Dragon Wars became the first game that Interplay published while it continued to score hits with titles such as Battle Chess, titles that demonstrated early on the developer's preference for risk-taking involving unconventional concepts for them.

In the early 1990s, Interplay founded a division called MacPlay that was tasked with porting the company's games to the macOS. Interplay's business grew well into the mid-1990s, such that Fargo, its CEO, split it into several more divisions with some employed as directors overseeing the divisions' projects. One of the divisions was created in 1995, called VR Sports and later renamed to Interplay Sports in 1998, to deal with sports games. Another division was founded in 1996 to develop role-playing games, becoming Black Isle Studios two years later. Brainstorm was also founded in 1996 and specialized in educational games. Interplay also acquired Shiny Entertainment in 1995, best known as the creator of the Earthworm Jim series. Further notable releases by Interplay during that time include Parallax Software's Descent and its own Fallout series.

By 1998, Interplay was hit with a bankruptcy crisis. To avoid closure, it began trading on the NASDAQ exchange under the new and current name, Interplay Entertainment. However, repeated development delays, poor sales showings, stiffened competition in the PC gaming market, and the company's underestimation of console demand contributed to its financial woes. It was delisted from NASDAQ in 2002, and Fargo's successor, Titus Interactive co-founder Hervé Caen, decided that the company must cancel numerous current projects and close or sell its studios. 2004's Baldur's Gate: Dark Alliance II would become the last game published by Interplay until 2010 with its establishment of Interplay Discovery, and the company narrowly avoided the corporate death penalty by selling the Fallout license to Bethesda Softworks in 2007, clearing its debt.

Of the divisions Interplay had formed in its lifetime, only Black Isle Studios and Interplay Discovery remain active, though the former was briefly shut down in 2003 before it was reopened in 2012. Digital Mayhem operated from 2000 to 2003. MacPlay was shut down in 1998 before it was acquired and relaunched by United Developers in 2000. Shiny Entertainment was sold to Atari SA in 2002. Tribal Dreams developed only one game before it was closed in 1998. The following is a list of games developed, published or distributed by Interplay or any of its divisions.

== Legend ==
Video game platforms
| 3DO | 3DO | AMI | Amiga | AMI32 | Amiga CD32 |
| APPII | Apple II | APPGS | Term not found | ARC | Acorn Archimedes |
| ATR | Atari 8-bit computers | ATRST | Atari ST, Atari Falcon | C64 | Commodore 64 |
| CDTV | CDTV | CPC | Amstrad CPC | DC | Dreamcast |
| DOS | PC DOS / MS-DOS, Windows 3.X | DROID | Android | DSiWare | Term not found |
| GB | Game Boy | GBA | Game Boy Advance, iQue GBA | GBC | Game Boy Color |
| GCN | GameCube | GEN | Genesis / Mega Drive | iOS | iOS, iPhone, iPod, iPadOS, iPad, visionOS, Apple Vision Pro |
| LIN | Linux, SteamOS | MAC | Classic Mac OS, 2001 and before | N64 | Nintendo 64, iQue Player |
| NES | Nintendo Entertainment System / Famicom | NX | (replace with NS) | OSX | macOS |
| PC98 | PC-9800 series | PS1 | PlayStation 1 | PS2 | PlayStation 2 |
| PS4 | PlayStation 4 | S32X | 32X | SAT | Sega Saturn |
| SCD | Sega CD / Mega-CD | SNES | Super NES / Super Famicom / Super Comboy | VC | Term not found |
| Wii | Wii, WiiWare, Wii Virtual Console | WIN | Windows, all versions Windows 95 and up | XBOX | (replace with XB) |
| XOne | (replace with XBO) | ZX | ZX Spectrum | | |

Video game genres
| Action | Action game | Action-adventure | Action-adventure game | Adventure | Adventure game |
| Business sim | Business simulation game | Digital tabletop | Digital tabletop game | Educational | Educational video game |
| Fighting | Fighting game | FPS | First-person shooter | Hack and slash | Hack and slash |
| Platformer | Platformer | Puzzle | Puzzle video game | Puzzle-platformer | Puzzle-platformer |
| Racing | Racing video game | RTS | Real-time strategy | RTT | Real-time tactics |
| RPG | Role-playing video game | Shoot 'em up | Shoot 'em up | Shooter | Shooter game |
| Simulation | Simulation video game | Sports | Sports video game | Strategy | Strategy video game |
| Tactical RPG | Tactical role-playing game | Tile matching | Tile-matching video game | TPS | Third-person shooter |
| Vehicle sim | Vehicle simulation game | Vehicular combat | Vehicular combat game | | |

== Games ==
| Name | Year | Genre(s) | Platforms | Notes | Ref. |
|---|---|---|---|---|---|
| Actua Tennis | 1999 | Sports (tennis) | PS1, WIN | Published the North American version only. | |
| The Adventures of Rad Gravity | 1990 | Platformer | NES | Published by Activision. | |
| Alone in the Dark | 1993 | Survival horror | 3DO, DOS, MAC | Developed by Infogrames. | |
| Another World | 1991 | Action-adventure | 3DO, AMI, APPGS, DOS, MAC, GEN, SNES, ATRST | Also known as Out of This World in the US, developed by Delphine Software. | |
| Astro Chase 3D | 1994 | Shooter | MAC | Developed by First Star Software. | |
| Atomic Bomberman | 1997 | Action | WIN | | |
| Baldur's Gate | 1998 | RPG | MAC, WIN | Developed by BioWare. | |
| Baldur's Gate II: Shadows of Amn | 2000 | RPG | MAC, WIN | Developed by BioWare. | |
| Baldur's Gate: Dark Alliance | 2001 | RPG | GCN, PS2, XBOX | Developed by Snowblind Studios. GameCube version developed by High Voltage Software. | |
| Baldur's Gate: Dark Alliance II | 2004 | RPG | PS2, XBOX | | |
| The Bard's Tale | 1985 | RPG | AMI, APPGS, APPII, C64, DOS, MAC, ATRST | Released as Tales of the Unknown, Volume 1: The Bard's Tale, published by Electronic Arts. | |
| The Bard's Tale Construction Set | 1991 | RPG | AMI, DOS | | |
| The Bard's Tale II: The Destiny Knight | 1986 | RPG | AMI, APPGS, APPII, C64, DOS | Published by Electronic Arts. | |
| The Bard's Tale III: Thief of Fate | 1988 | RPG | APPII, C64 | Published by Electronic Arts. | |
| Battle Arena Toshinden 2 | 1998 | Fighting | WIN | Developed by Kinesoft. | |
| Battle Chess | 1988 | Digital tabletop | 3DO, AMI, APPGS, APPII, C64, AMI32, CDTV, DOS, MAC, ATRST, WIN | | |
| Battle Chess 4000 | 1992 | Digital tabletop | DOS | | |
| Battle Chess Enhanced CD-ROM | 1992 | Digital tabletop | DOS, MAC | | |
| Battle Chess II: Chinese Chess | 1990 | Digital tabletop | AMI, DOS | | |
| Battle Chess: Game of Kings | 2015 | Digital tabletop | WIN | | |
| Battlecruiser 3000AD v2.0 | 1998 | Vehicular combat (spaceship) | WIN | | |
| Beat the House 2 | 1997 | Simulation | WIN | Developed by Cetasoft. | |
| Black Dahlia | 1998 | Adventure | WIN | Published the North American and South American versions only. | |
| Blackthorne | 1994 | Platformer | DOS, GBA, MAC, S32X, SNES | Developed by Blizzard Entertainment. | |
| Blood & Magic | 1996 | RTS | DOS, WIN | Developed by Tachyon Studios. | |
| Boogerman: A Pick and Flick Adventure | 1995 | Platformer | GEN, SNES, Wii | | |
| Borrowed Time | 1985 | Interactive fiction | AMI, APPII, C64, DOS, ATRST, MAC | Published by Activision. | |
| Bust-A-Move 4 | 2000 | Puzzle | WIN | Developed by Taito. | |
| Buzz Aldrin's Race Into Space | 1993 | CMS, TBS | DOS | Developed by Strategic Visions. | |
| Byzantine | 1997 | Adventure, Educational | WIN | Distributed the North American version only. | |
| Caesars Palace 2000 | 2000 | Simulation | DC, PS1, WIN | Developed by Runecraft. | |
| Caesars Palace II | 1998 | Simulation | GBC, PS1 | | |
| Caesars Palace Slots | 1998 | Simulation | DOS | | |
| Carmageddon | 1997 | Racing, Vehicular combat | DOS, MAC | | |
| Carmageddon II | 1998 | Racing, Vehicular combat | GBC, MAC, N64, PS1, WIN | | |
| Casper | 1996 | Action-adventure | 3DO, GBC, PS1, SAT | | |
| Castles | 1991 | Strategy | AMI, DOS, ATRST | Developed by Quicksilver Software. | |
| Castles II: Siege and Conquest | 1991 | RTS | AMI32, DOS, MAC | | |
| Championship Golf: The Great Courses of the World, Volume One – Pebble Beach | 1986 | Sports (golf) | AMI, DOS | | |
| Checkmate | 1990 | Digital tabletop | AMI32, ATRST | | |
| ClayFighter | 1993 | Fighting | GEN, SNES, VC | Developed by Visual Concepts. | |
| ClayFighter 2: Judgment Clay | 1995 | Fighting | SNES | | |
| ClayFighter 63⅓ | 1997 | Fighting | N64 | | |
| ClayFighter: The Sculptor's Cut | 1998 | Fighting | N64 | Released as a Blockbuster Video rental exclusive. | |
| ClayFighter: Tournament Edition | 1994 | Fighting | SNES | Developed by Visual Concepts and released as a Blockbuster Video rental exclusive | |
| Claymates | 1993 | Platformer | SNES | Developed by Visual Concepts. | |
| Conquest of the New World | 1996 | Strategy | DOS, MAC | | |
| Crazy Cars: Hit the Road | 2012 | Racing | DROID, iOS, WIN | Developed by Little World Entertainment and published by Microïds. | |
| Crazy Cats Love | 2011 | Puzzle | iOS | | |
| Crime Killer | 1998 | Action | PS1, WIN | Developed by Pixelogic. | |
| Cruise for a Corpse | 1991 | Adventure | AMI, DOS, MAC | Published by Interplay. | |
| Cyberia | 1994 | Action-adventure | 3DO, DOS, PS1, SAT | | |
| Darius Gaiden | 1998 | Shoot 'em up | WIN | Developed by Kinesoft | |
| Death and the Fly | 2011 | Puzzle-platformer | WIN | Developed by Independent Programmist Group. | |
| Descent | 1994 | FPS | ARC, DOS, MAC, PS1, WIN | Developed by Parallax Software. | |
| Descent II | 1996 | FPS | ARC, DOS, MAC, PS1, WIN | Developed by Parallax Software. | |
| Descent 3 | 1999 | FPS | MAC, LIN, WIN | Developed by Outrage Entertainment. | |
| Descent: FreeSpace – The Great War | 1998 | Vehicular combat (spaceship) | WIN | Developed by Volition. | |
| Descent to Undermountain | 1997 | RPG | DOS | | |
| Die by the Sword | 1998 | Action-adventure | WIN | Developed by Treyarch Invention. | |
| Disruptor | 1996 | FPS | PS1 | Published the PAL and Japanese versions only. | |
| Dragon Dice | 1997 | Strategy | WIN | | |
| Dragon Wars | 1989 | RPG | AMI, APPGS, APPII, C64, DOS | | |
| Dragon's Blood | 2000 | Hack and slash | DC | Published non-North American releases. | |
| Dungeon Master II: The Legend of Skullkeep | 1993 | RPG | AMI, DOS, MAC, PC98, SCD | | |
| Earth 2140 | 1997 | RTS | DOS | Published by Interplay in North America. | |
| Earthworm Jim | 1994 | Platformer | SCD | | |
| Earthworm Jim 3D | 1999 | Platformer | N64, WIN | Publisher only. Rockstar Games was licensed to publish the North American release of the N64 version. | |
| Earthworm Jim 4 | Unreleased | Platformer | Amico | Reportedly canceled. | |
| Evolution: The Game of Intelligent Life | 1997 | Simulation | WIN | | |
| Evolva | 2000 | Action | WIN | Developed by Computer Artworks. | |
| F/A-18E Super Hornet | 2000 | Vehicular combat (Plane) | WIN | Distributed the North American version only. | |
| Fallout | 1997 | RPG | DOS, MAC, WIN | | |
| Fallout 2 | 1998 | RPG | DOS, MAC, WIN | | |
| Fallout Tactics: Brotherhood of Steel | 2001 | Tactical RPG | WIN | Developed by Micro Forté. | |
| Fallout: Brotherhood of Steel | 2004 | Action RPG | PS2, XBOX | | |
| Fatal Fury 3: Road to the Final Victory | 1998 | Fighting | WIN | Developed by Kinesoft | |
| The Forgotten Realms Archives | 1997 | RPG | DOS, WIN | A compilation of several Advanced Dungeons & Dragons games by Strategic Simulations, Inc. | |
| Fragile Allegiance | 1997 | RTS | DOS, WIN | Published the North American version only. | |
| Frankenstein: Through the Eyes of the Monster | 1995 | Adventure | MAC, SAT, WIN | Developed by Amazing Media. | |
| FreeSpace 2 | 1999 | Vehicular combat (spaceship) | WIN | Developed by Volition. | |
| Future Wars | 1990 | Adventure | AMI, DOS, ATRST | Developed by Delphine Software. | |
| Gekido | 2000 | Brawler | PS1 | Published the North American version only. | |
| Gex: Enter the Gecko | 1999 | Platformer | GBC | Published the European version only. | |
| Giants: Citizen Kabuto | 2000 | TPS | PS2, WIN | | |
| Hardwar | 1998 | Vehicular combat (spaceship) | WIN | Published the North American version only. | |
| Heart of Darkness | 1998 | Platformer | PS1, WIN | Published the North American version only. | |
| Heart of the Alien | 1994 | Platformer | SCD | By Interplay Entertainment and Delphine Software. Developed by Virgin Interactive. | |
| Homesteader | 2011 | Tile matching | WIN | Developed by Bogemic Games. | |
| Hostile Waters: Antaeus Rising | 2001 | RTS | WIN | Published the North American version only. | |
| Hunter: The Reckoning | 2002 | Hack and slash | GCN, XBOX | | |
| Icewind Dale | 2000 | RPG | WIN | | |
| Icewind Dale II | 2002 | RPG | WIN | | |
| Incoming | 1999 | Shooter | DC | Published the North American version only. | |
| International Rally Championship | 1997 | Racing | WIN | Developed by Magnetic Fields. | |
| Interplay Sports Baseball Edition 2000 | 1999 | Sports (baseball) | PS1, WIN | Released as Interplay Sports Baseball 2000 for PS1. | |
| Invictus | 2000 | RTS | WIN | Developed by Quicksilver Software. | |
| J.R.R. Tolkien's The Lord of the Rings, Vol. I | 1990 | RPG | AMI, DOS | | |
| J.R.R. Tolkien's The Lord of the Rings, Vol. I | 1994 | RPG | SNES | | |
| J.R.R. Tolkien's The Lord of the Rings, Vol. II: The Two Towers | 1992 | RPG | DOS | | |
| Jagged Alliance 2: Unfinished Business | 2000 | Tactical RPG | WIN | Developed by Sir-Tech. | |
| James Bond 007: The Stealth Affair | 1990 | Adventure | AMI, DOS, ATRST | Published the North American release only. | |
| Jetfighter III | 1997 | Vehicular combat (Plane) | DOS | Developed by Mission Studios. | |
| Jetfighter: Full Burn | 1998 | Vehicular combat (Plane) | WIN | Published the North American and South American versions only. | |
| Kingdom: The Far Reaches | 1995 | Interactive film | 3DO, DOS, MAC | | |
| Kingpin: Life of Crime | 1999 | FPS | LIN, WIN | Developed by Xatrix Entertainment. | |
| Kingpin: Reloaded | 2024 | FPS | NX, PS4, WIN, XOne | Published by Interplay & 3D Realms. | |
| The Last Express | 2000 | Adventure | DOS, MAC | Re-release only. | |
| Learn to Program BASIC | 1998 | Educational | MAC, WIN | | |
| Legendary Wars: T-Rex Rumble | 2010 | RTS | DSiWare | | |
| Lexi-Cross | 1991 | Word | DOS, MAC | | |
| Lionheart: Legacy of the Crusader | 2003 | RPG | WIN | Co-developed with Reflexive Entertainment. | |
| Loaded | 1995 | Shoot 'em up | PS1, SAT | Published the North American version only. | |
| The Lost Vikings | 1992 | Puzzle-platformer | AMI, AMI32, DOS, GEN, SNES | Developed by Silicon & Synapse. | |
| The Lost Vikings 2 | 1997 | Puzzle-platformer | PS1, SAT, SNES, WIN | Known in the United States as Norse By Norsewest: Return of the Lost Vikings | |
| Mario Teaches Typing | 1992 | Educational | DOS, MAC | | |
| Mario Teaches Typing 2 | 1997 | Educational | MAC, WIN | | |
| Mario's Game Gallery | 1995 | | DOS, MAC, WIN | Originally sold for DOS and Macintosh, later rereleased as Mario's FUNdamentals for Macintosh and Windows | |
| MDK | 1997 | TPS | DOS, MAC, PS1, WIN | | |
| MDK2 | 2000 | TPS | DC, PS2, Wii, WIN | Developed by BioWare. | |
| MDK2 HD | 2011 | TPS | WIN | Developed by Overhaul Games. | |
| Meantime | Canceled | RPG | APPII, C64 | | |
| Mechanized Assault & Exploration | 1996 | Strategy | DOS | | |
| Mechanized Assault & Exploration 2 | 1998 | Strategy | WIN | | |
| Men in Black: The Series | 1999 | Shoot 'em up | GBC | Published the European version only. | |
| Messiah | 2000 | Action, Shooter | WIN | Developed by Shiny Entertainment. | |
| Metropolis Card Club | 2001 | Digital tabletop | WIN | | |
| Milo's Astro Lanes | 1999 | Sports | N64 | Published the PAL version only. | |
| Mindshadow | 1984 | Adventure | AMI, APPII, ATR, C64, CPC, DOS, MAC, ATRST, ZX | Published by Activision. | |
| Mortyr 2093-1944 | 1999 | FPS | WIN | Published the North American version only. | |
| Mummy: Tomb of the Pharaoh | 1996 | Adventure | MAC, WIN | Developed by Amazing Media. | |
| Neuromancer | 1988 | Action-adventure | AMI, APPGS, APPII, C64, DOS | | |
| Normality | 1996 | Adventure | DOS | Published the North American version only. | |
| Of Light and Darkness: The Prophecy | 1998 | Adventure | WIN | | |
| Omar Sharif on Bridge | 1992 | Digital tabletop | DOS | Published the North American version only. | |
| Off-Road Redneck Racing | 2001 | Racing | WIN | Published the North American version only. | |
| Peter Jacobsen's Golden Tee Golf | 1998 | Sports (golf) | WIN | Developed by Incredible Technologies. | |
| Pinball Yeah! | 2010 | Pinball | OSX, iOS, WIN | Developed by CodeRunners and published under the label Interplay Discovery. | |
| Planescape: Torment | 1999 | RPG | WIN | | |
| Poker Night with David Sklansky | 1999 | Simulation | WIN | Developed by Cetasoft. | |
| Prehistorik Man | 2010 | Platformer | DSiWare | | |
| Pro League Baseball | 1992 | Sports (baseball) | DOS | Distributor only. | |
| Project V13 | Canceled | RPG | WIN | | |
| Puzzle Bobble | 1996 | Tile matching | WIN | Developed by Kinesoft. | |
| Puzzle Bobble 2 | 1997 | Tile matching | WIN | Developed by Kinesoft. | |
| R/C Stunt Copter | 1999 | Vehicle sim (Plane) | PS1 | | |
| Raiden II | 1997 | Shoot 'em up | WIN | Developed by Kinesoft. | |
| Realms of the Haunting | 1997 | Action-adventure | DOS | Published the North American version only. | |
| Red Asphalt | 1998 | Racing | PS1 | | |
| Redneck Deer Huntin' | 1998 | Sports (hunting) | DOS | Developed by Xatrix Entertainment. | |
| Redneck Rampage | 1997 | FPS | DOS, MAC | Developed by Xatrix Entertainment. | |
| Redneck Rampage Rides Again | 1998 | FPS | DOS | Developed by Xatrix Entertainment. | |
| Re-Loaded | 1996 | Shoot 'em up | DOS, PS1 | | |
| Renegade Racers | 2000 | Racing | PS1, WIN | Developed by Promethean Designs. | |
| The Riddle of the Maze | 1994 | Interactive fiction | MAC | | |
| RoboCop Versus The Terminator | 1993 | Platformer | SNES | Published by Virgin Interactive. | |
| Rock n' Roll Racing | 1993 | Racing | GBA, GEN, SNES | Developed by Silicon & Synapse. | |
| RPM Racing | 1991 | Racing | SNES | Developed by Silicon & Synapse. | |
| Run Like Hell | 2002 | TPS | PS2, XBOX | Developed by Digital Mayhem | |
| Russian 6 Pak | 1994 | | DOS | Developed by MIR Dialogue. | |
| Sacrifice | 2000 | RTS | WIN | | |
| Samurai Shodown II | 2000 | Fighting | WIN | Developed by Kinesoft. | |
| Sandwarriors | 1997 | Vehicular combat (Plane) | WIN | Published the North American version only. | |
| Shattered Steel | 1996 | Vehicle sim | DOS, MAC | Developed by BioWare. | |
| SimCity Enhanced CD-ROM | 1994 | City builder | DOS | Licensed by Maxis. | |
| Solitaire Deluxe | 1995 | Digital tabletop | WIN | | |
| Solitaire for Windows | 1993 | Digital tabletop | WIN | | |
| Soulbringer | 2000 | RPG | WIN | Published the North American version only. | |
| Star Reach | 1994 | RTS | DOS | | |
| Star Trek: 25th Anniversary | 1992 | Adventure | AMI, DOS, MAC | | |
| Star Trek: 25th Anniversary | 1992 | Adventure | NES | Published by Ultra Games in North America and Konami in Europe. | |
| Star Trek: 25th Anniversary | 1992 | Action | GB | Produced by Interplay, developed by Visual Concepts, published by Ultra Games. | |
| Star Trek: Judgment Rites | 1993 | Adventure | DOS, MAC | | |
| Star Trek: Klingon Academy | 2000 | Vehicle sim (Spaceship) | WIN | | |
| Star Trek: New Worlds | 2000 | Strategy | WIN | | |
| Star Trek Pinball | 1998 | Pinball | DOS | | |
| Star Trek: Starfleet Academy | 1997 | Vehicle sim (Spaceship) | MAC, WIN | | |
| Star Trek: Starfleet Academy – Starship Bridge Simulator | 1994 | Simulation | S32X, SNES | Developed by Paramount Interactive | |
| Star Trek: Starfleet Command | 1999 | RTT, Vehicle sim (Spaceship) | WIN | | |
| Star Trek Starfleet Command II: Empires at War | 2000 | RTT, Vehicle sim (Spaceship) | WIN | | |
| Start-Up | 2000 | Business sim | WIN | Distributed the North American version only. | |
| Stonekeep | 1995 | RPG | DOS | | |
| Stonekeep: Bones of the Ancestors | 2012 | RPG | Wii | Developed by Alpine Studios. | |
| Super Castles | 1994 | Strategy | SNES | A Japan-exclusive video game | |
| Super Runabout: San Francisco Edition | 2000 | Racing | DC | Published the North American version only. | |
| SWIV 3D | 1996 | Shoot 'em up | DOS, WIN | Published the North American version only. | |
| Swords and Serpents | 1990 | RPG | NES | Published by Acclaim Entertainment. | |
| Tanktics | 1999 | Strategy | WIN | Published the North American version only. | |
| Tass Times in Tonetown | 1986 | Interactive fiction | AMI, APPGS, APPII, C64, DOS, MAC, ATRST | Published by Activision. | |
| Tempest 2000 | 1996 | Shoot 'em up | PS1, SAT | Developed by High Voltage Software. Titled Tempest X3 for PlayStation. | |
| Time Gate: Knight's Chase | 1996 | Action-adventure | DOS | Co-published with I-Motion in North America. | |
| Tommy Tronic | 2010 | Platformer | WIN | Developed by Oasis Games and published under the label Interplay Discovery. | |
| Total Recall | 1990 | Platformer | NES | Developed by Acclaim Entertainment. | |
| The Tracer Sanction | 1984 | Interactive fiction | APPII, C64, DOS | Published by Activision. | |
| Track Meet | 1991 | Sports | GB | | |
| Trog! | 1991 | Maze | NES | Licensed by Bally Midway Mfg Co. Produced by Interplay, developed by Visual Concepts, published by Acclaim Entertainment, Inc. | |
| USCF Chess | 1997 | Digital tabletop | WIN | | |
| Virtual Deep Sea Fishing | 1999 | Fishing | WIN | Developed by Taff System. | |
| Virtual Pool | 1995 | Sports (pool) | DOS, MAC, PS1, WIN | Developed by Celeris. | |
| Virtual Pool 2 | 1997 | Sports (pool) | WIN | Developed by Celeris. | |
| Virtual Pool 3 | 2000 | Sports (pool) | WIN | Developed by Celeris. | |
| Virtual Pool Hall | 1999 | Sports (pool) | WIN | Developed by Celeris. | |
| Virtual Snooker | 1996 | Sports | DOS | Developed by Celeris. | |
| Virtual Tennis | 1999 | Sports | WIN | Developed by Gremlin Interactive. Not to be confused with the 1999 Sega video game Virtua Tennis. | |
| VR Baseball 2000 | 1998 | Sports (baseball) | WIN | | |
| VR Baseball '97 | 1997 | Sports (baseball) | PS1, WIN | | |
| VR Baseball '99 | 1998 | Sports (baseball) | PS1 | | |
| VR Soccer | 1996 | Sports (soccer) | DOS, PS1, SAT | | |
| VR Sports Powerboat Racing | 1998 | Racing | PS1, WIN | Developed by Promethean Designs. | |
| Wall Street Trader 2000 | 1999 | Business sim | WIN | Distributed the North American version only. | |
| Warcraft: Orcs & Humans | 1994 | RTS | WIN | Published the European version only. | |
| Wasteland | 1988 | RPG | APPII, C64, DOS | | |
| Waterworld: The Quest for Dry Land | 1997 | RTS | DOS | Developed by Intelligent Games. | |
| Whiplash | 1996 | Racing | DOS | Developed by Gremlin Interactive. | |
| Wild 9 | 1998 | Platformer | PS1 | | |
| Wild Wild Racing | 2000 | Racing | PS2 | Developed by Rage Software. | |
| Wolfenstein 3D | 1994 | FPS | 3DO, MAC | Developed by id Software. | |
| Y2K: The Game | 1999 | Adventure | WIN | Developed by Runecraft. | |
| Zeitgeist: Laser Fighter | 1998 | Rail shooter | WIN | Developed by Kinesoft. | |
| Zero Divide: Techno Warrior | 1998 | Fighting | WIN | Developed by Kinesoft. | |

== Expansion packs ==
Interplay also developed, published, or distributed expansion packs, software that expands existing video games.

| Name | Year | Expands | Platforms | Notes | Ref. |
|---|---|---|---|---|---|
| Baldur's Gate: Tales of the Sword Coast | 1999 | Baldur's Gate | WIN | | |
| Baldur's Gate II: Throne of Bhaal | 2001 | Baldur's Gate II: Shadows of Amn | WIN | | |
| Carmageddon: Splat Pack | 1997 | Carmageddon | DOS | | |
| Castles: The Northern Campaign | 1991 | Castles | DOS | | |
| Descent: FreeSpace – Silent Threat | 1998 | Descent: FreeSpace – The Great War | WIN | | |
| Descent Levels of the World | 1995 | Descent | DOS | | |
| Descent II: The Vertigo Series | 1996 | Descent II | DOS | Sold separately or as part of the Descent II: The Infinite Abyss bundle. | |
| Descent 3: Mercenary | 1999 | Descent 3 | WIN | | |
| Die by the Sword: Limb from Limb | 1998 | Die by the Sword | WIN | | |
| Icewind Dale: Heart of Winter | 2001 | Icewind Dale | WIN | | |
| Jetfighter III: Enhanced Campaign CD | 1997 | Jetfighter III | DOS | | |
| Redneck Rampage: Suckin' Grits on Route 66 | 1997 | Redneck Rampage | DOS | | |
| Star Trek Starfleet Command: Orion Pirates | 2001 | Star Trek Starfleet Command II: Empires at War | WIN | Standalone expansion pack. | |

== Sources ==
- Kunkel, Bill (2009). Foreword. Classic Home Video Games 1985-1988 – A Complete Reference Guide. By Weiss, Brett. McFarland & Company. ISBN 978-0-7864-3660-6.
- Herman, Leonard (2011). Foreword. Classic Home Video Games 1989-1990 – A Complete Guide to Sega Genesis, Neo Geo and TurboGrafx-16 Games. By Weiss, Brett. McFarland & Company. ISBN 978-0-7864-4172-3.
- Barton, Matt (2013). Honoring the Code: Conversations with Great Game Designers. CRC Press. ISBN 978-1-4665-6753-5.
- Fox, Matt (2013). The Video Games Guide: 1,000+ Arcade, Console and Computer Games, 1962-2012 (Second ed.). McFarland & Company. ISBN 978-0-7864-7257-4.
- Barton, Matt; Stacks, Shane (2019). Dungeons and Desktops: The History of Computer Role-Playing Games 2e (Second ed.). CRC Press. ISBN 978-1-138-57464-9.
- Rignall, Julian "Jaz" (2019). Foreword. The NES Encyclopedia: Every Game Released for the Nintendo Entertainment System. By Scullion, Chris. White Owl. ISBN 978-1-5267-3779-3.
- Bayliss, Kevin (2020). Foreword. The SNES Encyclopedia: Every Game Released for the Super Nintendo Entertainment System. By Scullion, Chris. White Owl. ISBN 978-1-5267-3783-0.
- Gelinas, Ben (2020). BioWare: Stories and Secrets from 25 Years of Game Development. Dark Horse Comics. ISBN 978-1-5067-1879-8.
- McFerran, Damien (2021). "Forework". The Sega Mega Drive & Genesis Encyclopedia: Every Game Released for Sega's 16-bit Console. By Scullion, Chris. White Owl. ISBN 978-1-5267-4659-7.
- Lendino, Jamie (2022). Murray, Matthew (ed.). Starflight: How the PC and DOS Exploded Computer Gaming 1987–1994. Steel Gear Press. pp. 240–242. ISBN 978-1-7323552-9-3.
