= Interplay Entertainment =

American video game developer and publisher

Interplay Entertainment Corp.
- Formerly: Interplay Productions (1983–1998)
- Type: Public
- Traded as: Expert Market: IPLY
- Industry: Video games
- Founded: October 1983; 42 years ago in Irvine, California, US
- Founders: Brian Fargo; Rebecca Heineman; Jay Patel; Chris Wells; Troy Worrell
- Headquarters: Los Angeles, US
- Area served: Worldwide
- Key people: Hervé Caen (CEO)
- Products: Baldur's Gate series; Battle Chess series; ClayFighter series; Descent series; Earthworm Jim series; Fallout series; Icewind Dale series; Mario Teaches Typing; MDK series; Planescape: Torment; Stonekeep; Wasteland
- Revenue: 1,380,000 United States dollar (2010)
- Net income: 1,030,000 United States dollar (2010)
- Website: interplay.com

Interplay Entertainment Corp. is an American video game developer and publisher based in Los Angeles. The company was founded in 1983 as Interplay Productions by developers Brian Fargo, Jay Patel, Troy Worrell, and Rebecca Heineman, as well as investor Chris Wells. As a developer, Interplay is best known as the creator of the Fallout series and as a publisher for the Baldur's Gate and Descent series.

== History ==
=== Interplay Productions ===
The logo used for Interplay Productions on the cover of Wasteland; Brian Fargo stated that the logo was intended to resemble a person seated in front of a keyboard.

Prior to Interplay, the company's founding developers—Brian Fargo, Troy Worrell, Jay Patel, and Rebecca Heineman—worked for Boone Corporation, a video game developer based in California. When Boone eventually folded, the four got together with investor Chris Wells and, believing they could create a company that was better than Boone, founded Interplay in October 1983. The first projects were non-original and consisted of software conversions and even some military work for Loral Corporation. After negotiations with Activision, Interplay entered a US$100,000 contract to produce three illustrated text adventures for them. Published in 1984, Mindshadow is loosely based on Robert Ludlum's Bourne Identity while The Tracer Sanction puts the player in the role of an interplanetary secret agent. Borrowed Time which features a script by Arnie Katz's Subway Software followed in 1985. These adventures built upon work previously done by Fargo; his first game was the 1981-published Demon's Forge.

The same year, Interplay Productions, then contracted out by Electronic Arts, ported EA's Racing Destruction Set to the Atari 8-bit computers. The conversion, entirely coded by Rebecca Heineman, was released in 1986 via Electronic Arts for the United States and Ariolasoft for the European market.

Interplay's parser was developed by Fargo and an associate and in one version understands about 250 nouns and 200 verbs as well as prepositions and indirect objects. In 1986, Tass Times in Tonetown followed. Interplay made a name for itself as a quality developer of role-playing video games with the three-part series The Bard's Tale (1985–1988), critically acclaimed Wasteland (1988) and Dragon Wars (1989). All of them were published by Electronic Arts.

Interplay started publishing its own games, beginning with Neuromancer and Battle Chess, in 1988, and then moved on to publish and distribute games from other companies, while continuing internal game development. In 1995, Interplay published the hit game Descent, developed by startup Parallax Software. Interplay published several Star Trek video games, including Star Trek: 25th Anniversary for computers and for Nintendo Entertainment System and Star Trek: Judgment Rites. These games had later CD-ROM editions released with the original Star Trek cast providing voices. Interplay also published Starfleet Academy and Klingon Academy games, and Starfleet Command series, beginning with Star Trek: Starfleet Command. Another game, Star Trek: Secret of Vulcan Fury, was in development in the late 1990s but was never completed and much of its staff laid off due to budgetary cuts prompted by various factors. In 1995, after several years of delays, Interplay finally published its role-playing game Stonekeep. Other PC games released during the mid- to late 1990s included Carmageddon, Fragile Allegiance, Hardwar and Redneck Rampage.

During the early 1990s, Fargo served as an advisor to Silicon & Synapse, which would ultimately become Blizzard Entertainment. In exchange for 10% equity in the company, Fargo contracted Silicon & Synapse to port games developed by Interplay onto other consoles, providing the studio with its initial funding to support its transition to making original games.

In 1997, Interplay developed and released Fallout, a successful and critically acclaimed role-playing video game set in a retro-futuristic post-apocalyptic setting. Black Isle Studios, a newly created in-house developer, followed with the sequel, Fallout 2, in 1998. Another successful subsequent Interplay franchise was Baldur's Gate, a Dungeons & Dragons game that was developed by BioWare and which spawned a successful expansion, sequel and spin-off series. The spin-off series started with Baldur's Gate: Dark Alliance; the game's success forged a sequel as well. Aside from Dark Alliance, Interplay published a few notable console series such as Loaded and the fighting game series ClayFighter and the games by Shiny Entertainment, MDK and Wild 9.

=== Rebranding as Interplay Entertainment, Titus minority acquisition (1998–2002) ===
In 1998, Interplay's financial issues became dire. To avert bankruptcy, Interplay went public on the NASDAQ stock exchange under the name Interplay Entertainment. The shares started trading at $5.50 per share on June 19.

By 1999, Interplay continued to endure losses under Brian Fargo due to increased competition, less-than-stellar returns on Interplay's sports division, and the lack of console titles. Because of this, the company forced itself to seek additional funding from an outside third party. On February 17, 1999, the company entered into a distribution agreement with British game publisher Virgin Interactive, where Interplay would acquire a 43.9% stake (initially a 49.9% stake) in the company and allow Virgin to exclusively distribute its titles in Europe, effectively replacing Interplay's own distribution arm in the region. Interplay also announced that it would distribute Virgin Interactive's titles in North America and several other territories including South America and Japan. On March 23, 1999, it was announced that the Paris-based Titus Interactive had invested $10 million in the publisher with a considered chance of purchasing Universal Pictures' stake in Interplay, which would allow Titus to own 34% of the company's shares and allow for Interplay to distribute Titus' products in North America. By May, $25 million was invested by Titus, which within a few months was increased by another $10 million. By August, Titus owned 57% of Interplay's shares.

On 16 April 2001, Titus announced it had expanded its control shares in Interplay to 72.5%. On the same day, it announced it had purchased Interplay's stake in Virgin Interactive, effectively making the latter a fully owned subsidiary of Titus, which was to allow the three companies to simplify their European distribution arms under the singular Virgin Interactive umbrella. On August 28, Titus announced that it had appointed Vivendi Universal Publishing as Interplay's North American distributor in order for Interplay to focus more on development. Prior to this, Titus resecured full distribution rights to its titles in North America, which were not counted for as part of the Vivendi Universal deal. On September 27, Interplay announced that Baldur's Gate: Dark Alliance and Giants: Citizen Kabuto would become the first titles under the new agreement. On November 29, 2001, BioWare announced that it had ended its partnership with Interplay, citing unpaid royalties and Titus sublicensing distribution to third-parties for the reason. BioWare took Neverwinter Nights with them, with Infogrames purchasing worldwide publishing rights to the title in January 2002, while BioWare eventually reconsidered with Interplay.

=== Continued struggles (2002–2018) ===
On January 24, 2002, Interplay founder and CEO Brian Fargo resigned from the company, following Interplay's failed move to expand to console gaming as well as conflicts with Titus Interactive. He later went on to found InXile Entertainment. Titus' co-founder Hervé Caen took over as Interplay's new CEO and began a range of several unpopular but arguably necessary decisions to cancel various projects, in order to save the company. In April 2002, the company sold Shiny Entertainment to Infogrames for $47 million, which at turn also included an upcoming video game based on The Matrix as well as the video game rights to the property transferring over. Due to a low share price, Interplay's shares were delisted from the NASDAQ in 2002 and now trade on the over-the-counter (OTC) market.

The company continued to struggle throughout 2003 following an assortment of poorly-selling console titles. On September 29, 2003, the company was entered into a lawsuit with Vivendi Universal over alleged breaches of their partnership and a failure of payment. This led to Interplay ending its North American distribution deal with Vivendi Universal Games. On December 8, 2003, Interplay closed down Black Isle Studios and laid off its entire staff. The company was also involved in issues including debt. Feargus Urquhart later left Black Isle Studios and Interplay suffered a loss of US$20 million in that year.

By June 2004, Interplay's fate was appearing to show, once employees were showing up locked out of the company's offices and other events ensuing, although Titus' co-founder Eric Caen denied that Interplay was closing, deeming it as being "Still There". However, by June 7, it was reported that several California labor investigators had forcefully shut down Interplay's offices over unpaid royalties to developers, unpaid employees and not issuing any health insurance to them. By June 9, Interplay's offices had reopened after Herve Caen secured the funds to pay the insurance for Interplay's staff. On the same day, Titus Interactive announced it was declaring bankruptcy, which made Interplay's future uncertain. In July, it sold the Redneck Rampage franchise to Vivendi Universal Games for $300,000, and in October, licensed the rights to the Fallout franchise to Bethesda Softworks under a three-game deal, while Interplay would retain ownership of the franchise as well as full rights to an MMO title – Fallout Online. By then, Interplay's financial issues began to worsen.

In January 2005, Titus Interactive was officially declared bankrupt and closed down all its French operations effectively. Interplay soon purchased Titus' former assets and led to the company being burdened with debt.

In 2006, Interplay was brought up to the bankruptcy court once again in order to avoid the company going out of business.

In April 2007, in order to pay off creditors, the company altered its licensing agreement with Bethesda Softworks and sold the Fallout IP to them.

In September 2008, several games from Interplay's catalog were re-released on the digital distribution service GOG.com after being unavailable in retail distribution for years.

In August 2013, Interplay acquired the remaining rights to the FreeSpace franchise for $7,500 after THQ went to bankruptcy court.

=== Focus on re-releases of IP (2018–present) ===
In 2021, Interplay, via Black Isle Studios, re-released Baldur's Gate: Dark Alliance on modern consoles, and later that year also released a port of it on PC for the first time.

Interplay co-published with 3D Realms a remaster of Xatrix Entertainment's 1999 game Kingpin: Life of Crime. Slipgate Ironworks developed the game, known as Kingpin: Reloaded. It was announced on January 17, 2020 and released after a long delay on December 5, 2023.

== Litigation ==
In 2003 and 2004 Snowblind Studios and Interplay Entertainment had a dispute regarding the Dark Alliance Engine for Fallout: Brotherhood of Steel, Baldur's Gate: Dark Alliance II, and the GameCube version of the original Dark Alliance. The resolution allowed Interplay to retain the work it had already done using that engine, but not to use it in new work.

Bethesda Softworks sued Interplay in 2009, seeking an injunction to stop Interplay from developing Fallout Online and from selling Fallout Trilogy. After several trials spanning almost three years, Interplay gave Bethesda the full rights for Fallout Online for $2 million. Interplay's rights to sell and merchandise Fallout, Fallout 2, and Fallout Tactics: Brotherhood of Steel expired on December 31, 2013.

In 2010, TopWare Interactive revealed that it was developing Battle vs. Chess to be published by SouthPeak Games. Interplay sued it and won an injunction to stop sales in the United States. Interplay won the case by default, and a settlement for $200,000 plus interest was agreed upon on November 15, 2012.

== Games ==
Name	Year	Genre(s)	Platforms	Notes
Actua Tennis	1999	Sports	PS, Win	Published the North American version only.
The Adventures of Rad Gravity	1990	Platform	NES	Published by Activision.
Alone in the Dark	1993	Survival horror	3DO, DOS, Mac	Developed by Infogrames.
Another World	1991	Action-adventure	3DO, Ami, AppGS, DOS, Mac, SMD, SNES, ST	Also known as Out of This World in the US, developed by Delphine Software.
Astro Chase 3D	1994	Shooter	Mac	Developed by First Star Software.
Atomic Bomberman	1997	Action	Win	
Baldur's Gate	1998	Role-playing	Mac, Win	Developed by BioWare.
Baldur's Gate II: Shadows of Amn	2000	Role-playing	Mac, Win	Developed by BioWare.
Baldur's Gate: Dark Alliance	2001	Role-playing	GCN, PS2, Xbox	Developed by Snowblind Studios. GameCube version developed by High Voltage Software.
Baldur's Gate: Dark Alliance II	2004	Role-playing	PS2, Xbox	
The Bard's Tale	1985	Role-playing	Ami, AppGS, AppII, C64, DOS, Mac, ST	Released as Tales of the Unknown, Volume 1: The Bard's Tale, published by Electronic Arts.
The Bard's Tale Construction Set	1991	Role-playing	Ami, DOS	
The Bard's Tale II: The Destiny Knight	1986	Role-playing game	Ami, AppGS, AppII, C64, DOS	Published by Electronic Arts.
The Bard's Tale III: Thief of Fate	1988	Role-playing game	AppII, C64	Published by Electronic Arts.
Battle Arena Toshinden 2	1998	Fighting	Win	Developed by Kinesoft.
Battle Chess	1988	Chess	3DO, Ami, AppGS, AppII, C64, CD32, CDTV, DOS, Mac, ST, Win	
Battle Chess 4000	1992	Chess	DOS	
Battle Chess Enhanced CD-ROM	1992	Chess	DOS, Mac	
Battle Chess II: Chinese Chess	1990	Chess	Ami, DOS	
Battle Chess: Game of Kings	2015	Chess	Win	
Battlecruiser 3000AD v2.0	1998	Space trading and combat simulator	Win	
Beat the House 2	1997	Casino	Win	Developed by Cetasoft.
Black Dahlia	1998	Adventure	Win	Published the North American and South American versions only.
Blackthorne	1994	Platform	DOS, GBA, Mac, S32X, SNES	Developed by Blizzard Entertainment.
Blood & Magic	1996	Real-time strategy	DOS, Win	Developed by Tachyon Studios.
Boogerman: A Pick and Flick Adventure	1995	Platform	SMD, SNES, Wii	
Borrowed Time	1985	Interactive fiction	Ami, App, C64, DOS, ST, Mac	Published by Activision.
Bust-A-Move 4	2000	Puzzle	Win	Developed by Taito.
Buzz Aldrin's Race Into Space	1993	Construction and management, turn-based strategy	DOS	Developed by Strategic Visions.
Byzantine	1997	Adventure, educational	Win	Distributed the North American version only.
Caesars Palace 2000	2000	Casino	DC, PS1, Win	Developed by Runecraft.
Caesars Palace II	1998	Casino	GBC, PS1	
Caesars Palace Slots	1998	Casino	DOS	
Carmageddon	1997	Racing, vehicular combat	DOS, Mac	
Carmageddon II	1998	Racing, vehicular combat	GBC, Mac, N64, PS1, Win	
Casper	1996	Action-adventure	3DO, GBC, PS1, Sat	
Castles	1991	Strategy	Ami, DOS, ST	Developed by Quicksilver Software.
Castles II: Siege and Conquest	1991	Real-time strategy	Ami32, DOS, Mac	
Championship Golf: The Great Courses of the World, Volume One – Pebble Beach	1986	Sports	Ami, DOS	
Checkmate	1990	Chess	Ami32, ST	
ClayFighter	1993	Fighting	NDSi, SMD, SNES, Wii	Developed by Visual Concepts.
ClayFighter 2: Judgment Clay	1995	Fighting	SNES	
ClayFighter 63⅓	1997	Fighting	N64	
ClayFighter: The Sculptor's Cut	1998	Fighting	N64	Released as a Blockbuster Video rental exclusive.
ClayFighter: Tournament Edition	1994	Fighting	SNES	Developed by Visual Concepts and released as a Blockbuster Video rental exclusive
Claymates	1993	Platform	SNES	Developed by Visual Concepts.
Conquest of the New World	1996	Strategy	DOS, Mac	
Crazy Cars: Hit the Road	2012	Racing	Droid, iOS, Win	Developed by Little World Entertainment and published by Microïds.
Crazy Cats Love	2011	Puzzle	iOS	
Crime Killer	1998	Action	PS1, Win	Developed by Pixelogic.
Cruise for a Corpse	1991	Adventure	Ami, DOS, Mac	Published by Interplay.
Cyberia	1994	Action-adventure	3DO, DOS, PS1, Sat	
Darius Gaiden	1998	Shoot 'em up	Win	Developed by Kinesoft
Death and the Fly	2011	Puzzle-platform	Win	Developed by Independent Programmist Group.
Descent	1994	First-person shooter	Arc, DOS, Mac, PS1, Win	Developed by Parallax Software.
Descent II	1996	First-person shooter	Arc, DOS, Mac, PS1, Win	Developed by Parallax Software.
Descent 3	1999	First-person shooter	Mac, Lin, Win	Developed by Outrage Entertainment.
Descent: FreeSpace – The Great War	1998	Space combat simulator	Win	Developed by Volition.
Descent to Undermountain	1997	Role-playing	DOS	
Die by the Sword	1998	Action-adventure	Win	Developed by Treyarch Invention.
Disruptor	1996	First-person shooter	PS1	Published the PAL and Japanese versions only.
Dragon Dice	1997	Strategy	Win	
Dragon Wars	1989	Role-playing	Ami, AppGS, AppII, C64, DOS	
Dragon's Blood	2000	Hack and slash	DC	Published non-North American releases.
Dungeon Master II: The Legend of Skullkeep	1993	Role-playing	Ami, DOS, Mac, PC98, SCD	
Earth 2140	1997	Real-time strategy	DOS	Published by Interplay in North America.
Earthworm Jim	1994	Platform	SCD	
Earthworm Jim 3D	1999	Platform	N64, Win	Publisher only. Rockstar Games was licensed to publish the North American release of the N64 version.
Earthworm Jim 4	Unreleased	Platform	Amico	Reportedly canceled.
Evolva	2000	Action	Win	Developed by Computer Artworks.
F/A-18E Super Hornet	2000	Combat flight simulator	Win	Distributed the North American version only.
Fallout	1997	Role-playing	DOS, Mac, Win	
Fallout 2	1998	Role-playing	DOS, Mac, Win	
Fallout Tactics: Brotherhood of Steel	2001	Tactical role-playing	Win	Developed by Micro Forté.
Fallout: Brotherhood of Steel	2004	Action role-playing	PS2, Xbox	
Fatal Fury 3: Road to the Final Victory	1998	Fighting	Win	Developed by Kinesoft
The Forgotten Realms Archives	1997	Role-playing	DOS, Win	A compilation of several Advanced Dungeons & Dragons games by Strategic Simulations, Inc.
Fragile Allegiance	1997	Real-time strategy	DOS, Win	Published the North American version only.
Frankenstein: Through the Eyes of the Monster	1995	Adventure	Mac, Sat, Win	Developed by Amazing Media.
FreeSpace 2	1999	Space combat simulator	Win	Developed by Volition.
Future Wars	1990	Adventure	Ami, DOS, ST	Developed by Delphine Software.
Gekido	2000	Beat 'em up	PS1	Published the North American version only.
Gex: Enter the Gecko	1999	Platform	GBC	Published the European version only.
Giants: Citizen Kabuto	2000	Third-person shooter	PS2, Win	
Hardwar	1998	Space combat simulator	Win	Published the North American version only.
Heart of Darkness	1998	Platform	PS1, Win	Published the North American version only.
Heart of the Alien	1994	Platform	SCD	By Interplay Entertainment and Delphine Software. Developed by Virgin Interactive.
Homesteader	2011	Tile-matching	Win	Developed by Bogemic Games.
Hostile Waters: Antaeus Rising	2001	Real-time strategy	Win	Published the North American version only.
Hunter: The Reckoning	2002	Hack and slash	GCN, Xbox	
Icewind Dale	2000	Role-playing	Win	
Icewind Dale II	2002	Role-playing	Win	
Incoming	1999	Shooter	DC	Published the North American version only.
International Rally Championship	1997	Racing	Win	Developed by Magnetic Fields.
Interplay Sports Baseball Edition 2000	1999	Sports	PS1, Win	Released as Interplay Sports Baseball 2000 for PS1.
Invictus	2000	Real-time strategy	Win	Developed by Quicksilver Software.
J.R.R. Tolkien's The Lord of the Rings, Vol. I	1990	Role-playing	Ami, DOS	
J.R.R. Tolkien's The Lord of the Rings, Vol. I	1994	Role-playing	SNES	
J.R.R. Tolkien's The Lord of the Rings, Vol. II: The Two Towers	1992	Role-playing	DOS	
Jagged Alliance 2: Unfinished Business	2000	Tactical role-playing	Win	Developed by Sir-Tech.
James Bond 007: The Stealth Affair	1990	Adventure	Ami, DOS, ST	Published the North American release only.
Jetfighter III	1997	Combat flight simulator	DOS	Developed by Mission Studios.
Jetfighter: Full Burn	1998	Combat flight simulator	Win	Published the North American and South American versions only.
Kingdom: The Far Reaches	1995	Interactive film	3DO, DOS, Mac	
Kingpin: Life of Crime	1999	First-person shooter	Lin, Win	Developed by Xatrix Entertainment.
Kingpin: Reloaded	TBA	First-person shooter	NS, PS4, Win, XBO	To be published by Interplay & 3D Realms.
The Last Express	2000	Adventure	DOS, Mac	Re-release only.
Learn to Program BASIC	1998	Educational	Mac, Win	
Legendary Wars: T-Rex Rumble	2010	Real-time strategy	NDSi	
Lexi-Cross	1991	Word	DOS, Mac	
Lionheart: Legacy of the Crusader	2003	Role-playing	Win	Co-developed with Reflexive Entertainment.
Loaded	1995	Shoot 'em up	PS1, Sat	Published the North American version only.
The Lost Vikings	1992	Puzzle-platform	Ami, Ami32, DOS, SMD, SNES	Developed by Silicon & Synapse.
The Lost Vikings 2	1997	Puzzle-platform	PS1, Sat, SNES, Win	Known in the United States as Norse By Norsewest: Return of the Lost Vikings
Mario Teaches Typing	1992	Educational	DOS, Mac	
Mario Teaches Typing 2	1997	Educational	Mac, Win	
Mario's Game Gallery	1995	Game compilation	DOS, Mac, Win	Originally sold for DOS and Macintosh, later rereleased as Mario's FUNdamentals for Macintosh and Windows
MDK	1997	Third-person shooter	DOS, Mac, PS1, Win	
MDK2	2000	Third-person shooter	DC, PS2, Wii, Win	Developed by BioWare.
MDK2 HD	2011	Third-person shooter	Win	Developed by Overhaul Games.
Meantime	Canceled	Role-playing	AppII, C64	
Mechanized Assault & Exploration	1996	Strategy	DOS	
Mechanized Assault & Exploration 2	1998	Strategy	Win	
Men in Black: The Series	1999	Shoot 'em up	GBC	Published the European version only.
Messiah	2000	Action game, shooter game	Win	Developed by Shiny Entertainment.
Metropolis Card Club	2001	Casino	Win	
Milo's Astro Lanes	1999	Sports	N64	Published the PAL version only.
Mindshadow	1984	Adventure	Ami, AppII, ATR, C64, CPC, DOS, Mac, ST, ZX	Published by Activision.
Mortyr 2093-1944	1999	First-person shooter	Win	Published the North American version only.
Mummy: Tomb of the Pharaoh	1996	Adventure	Mac, Win	Developed by Amazing Media.
Neuromancer	1988	Action-adventure	Ami, AppGS, AppII, C64, DOS	
Normality	1996	Adventure	DOS	Published the North American version only.
Of Light and Darkness: The Prophecy	1998	Adventure	Win	
Omar Sharif on Bridge	1992	Card	DOS	Published the North American version only.
Off-Road Redneck Racing	2001	Racing	Win	Published the North American version only.
Peter Jacobsen's Golden Tee Golf	1998	Sports	Win	Developed by Incredible Technologies.
Pinball Yeah!	2010	Pinball	Mac, iOS, Win	Developed by CodeRunners and published under the label Interplay Discovery.
Planescape: Torment	1999	Role-playing	Win	
Poker Night with David Sklansky	1999	Casino	Win	Developed by Cetasoft.
Prehistorik Man	2010	Platform	NDSi	
Pro League Baseball	1992	Sports	DOS	Distributor only.
Project V13	Canceled	Role-playing	Win	
Puzzle Bobble	1996	Tile-matching	Win	Developed by Kinesoft.
Puzzle Bobble 2	1997	Tile-matching	Win	Developed by Kinesoft.
R/C Stunt Copter	1999	Flight simulator	PS1	
Raiden II	1997	Shoot 'em up	Win	Developed by Kinesoft.
Realms of the Haunting	1997	Action-adventure	DOS	Published the North American version only.
Red Asphalt	1998	Racing	PS1	
Redneck Deer Huntin'	1998	Sports	DOS	Developed by Xatrix Entertainment.
Redneck Rampage	1997	First-person shooter	DOS, Mac	Developed by Xatrix Entertainment.
Redneck Rampage Rides Again	1998	First-person shooter	DOS	Developed by Xatrix Entertainment.
Re-Loaded	1996	Shoot 'em up	DOS, PS1	
Renegade Racers	2000	Racing	PS1, Win	Developed by Promethean Designs.
The Riddle of the Maze	1994	Interactive fiction	Mac	
RoboCop Versus The Terminator	1993	Platform	SNES	Published by Virgin Interactive.
Rock n' Roll Racing	1993	Racing	GBA, SMD, SNES	Developed by Silicon & Synapse.
RPM Racing	1991	Racing	SNES	Developed by Silicon & Synapse.
Run Like Hell	2002	Third-person shooter	PS2, Xbox	Developed by Digital Mayhem
Russian 6 Pak	1994	Game compilation	DOS	Developed by MIR Dialogue.
Sacrifice	2000	Real-time strategy	Win	
Samurai Shodown II	2000	Fighting	Win	Developed by Kinesoft.
Sandwarriors	1997	Combat flight simulator	Win	Published the North American version only.
Shattered Steel	1996	Vehicle simulator	DOS, Mac	Developed by BioWare.
SimCity Enhanced CD-ROM	1994	City-building	DOS	Licensed by Maxis.
Solitaire Deluxe	1995	Card	Win	
Solitaire for Windows	1993	Card	Win	
Soulbringer	2000	Role-playing	Win	Published the North American version only.
Star Reach	1994	Real-time strategy	DOS	
Star Trek: 25th Anniversary	1992	Adventure	Ami, DOS, Mac	
Star Trek: 25th Anniversary	1992	Adventure	NES	Published by Ultra Games in North America and Konami in Europe.
Star Trek: 25th Anniversary	1992	Action	GB	Produced by Interplay, developed by Visual Concepts, published by Ultra Games.
Star Trek: Judgment Rites	1993	Adventure	DOS, Mac	
Star Trek: Klingon Academy	2000	Space flight simulator	Win	
Star Trek: New Worlds	2000	Strategy	Win	
Star Trek Pinball	1998	Pinball	DOS	
Star Trek: Starfleet Academy	1997	Space flight simulator	Mac, Win	
Star Trek: Starfleet Academy – Starship Bridge Simulator	1994	Simulation	S32X, SNES	Developed by Paramount Interactive
Star Trek: Starfleet Command	1999	Real-time tactics, space flight simulator	Win	
Star Trek Starfleet Command II: Empires at War	2000	Real-time tactics, space flight simulator	Win	
Start-Up	2000	Business simulation game	Win	Distributed the North American version only.
Stonekeep	1995	Role-playing	DOS	
Stonekeep: Bones of the Ancestors	2012	Role-playing	Wii	Developed by Alpine Studios.
Super Castles	1994	Strategy	SNES	A Japan-exclusive video game
Super Runabout: San Francisco Edition	2000	Racing	DC	Published the North American version only.
SWIV 3D	1996	Shoot 'em up	DOS, Win	Published the North American version only.
Swords and Serpents	1990	Role-playing	NES	Published by Acclaim Entertainment.
Tanktics	1999	Strategy	PS, Win	Published the North American version only.
Tass Times in Tonetown	1986	Interactive fiction	Ami, AppGS, AppII, C64, DOS, Mac, ST	Published by Activision.
Tempest 2000	1996	Shoot 'em up	PS1, Sat	Developed by High Voltage Software. Titled Tempest X3 for PlayStation.
Time Gate: Knight's Chase	1996	Action-adventure	DOS	Co-published with I-Motion in North America.
Tommy Tronic	2010	Platform	Win	Developed by Oasis Games and published under the label Interplay Discovery.
Total Recall	1990	Platform	NES	Developed by Acclaim Entertainment.
The Tracer Sanction	1984	Interactive fiction	AppII, C64, DOS	Published by Activision.
Track Meet	1991	Sports	GB	
Trog!	1991	Maze	NES	Licensed by Bally Midway Mfg Co. Produced by Interplay, developed by Visual Concepts, published by Acclaim Entertainment, Inc.
USCF Chess	1997	Chess	Win	
Virtual Deep Sea Fishing	1999	Fishing	Win	Developed by Taff System.
Virtual Pool	1995	Sports	DOS, Mac, PS1, Win	Developed by Celeris.
Virtual Pool 2	1997	Sports	Win	Developed by Celeris.
Virtual Pool 3	2000	Sports	Win	Developed by Celeris.
Virtual Pool Hall	1999	Sports	Win	Developed by Celeris.
Virtual Snooker	1996	Sports	DOS	Developed by Celeris.
VR Baseball 2000	1998	Sports	Win	
VR Baseball '97	1997	Sports	PS1, Win	
VR Baseball '99	1998	Sports	PS1	
VR Soccer	1996	Sports	DOS, PS1, Sat	
VR Sports Powerboat Racing	1998	Racing	PS1, Win	Developed by Promethean Designs.
Wall Street Trader 2000	1999	Business simulation	Win	Distributed the North American version only.
Warcraft: Orcs & Humans	1994	Real-time strategy	Win	Published the European version only.
Wasteland	1988	Role-playing	AppII, C64, DOS	
Waterworld: The Quest for Dry Land	1997	Real-time strategy	DOS	Developed by Intelligent Games.
Whiplash	1996	Racing	DOS	Developed by Gremlin Interactive.
Wild 9	1998	Platform	PS1	
Wild Wild Racing	2000	Racing	PS2	Developed by Rage Software.
Wolfenstein 3D	1994	First-person shooter	3DO, Mac	Developed by id Software.
Y2K: The Game	1999	Adventure	Win	Developed by Runecraft.
Zeitgeist: Laser Fighter	1998	Rail shooter	Win	Developed by Kinesoft.
Zero Divide: Techno Warrior	1998	Fighting	Win	Developed by Kinesoft.

== Studios ==
- Black Isle Studios in Orange County, California, started in 1996.

=== Interplay Discovery ===
This is a program in which Interplay publishes video games for indie developers. Five games have been released under the program and each is either a platformer or a puzzle video game and is released under digital distribution.

==== Games released under Interplay Discovery ====
- Pinball Yeah! is Interplay's first game, created by the Coderunners team based in Portugal and their first game since its return. The player must fight against an evil virtual AI system that wants nothing more than to see the demise of the player's high score.
- Tommy Tronic is Interplay's second game by the Discovery program and was developed by Oasis Games and was the studio's first project. Tommy Tronic features classic platforming. The player must run away from Giant Carrots and fight mutated tomatoes.
- Despite being the fourth announced game for the Discovery program, Homesteader is the third game released for the Discovery program. The game is developed by Bogemic Games and is a match-3 puzzle game. The game was released for the PC and had a framerate error.
- Despite being the third game announced for the Discovery program, Death and the Fly is the fourth game released for the Discovery Program.
- Crazy Cats Love is developed by Wolf Games and is Interplay's first video game made using the Unity 3D engine.

=== Defunct studios ===
- 14 Degrees East, the strategy division of Interplay, located in Beverly Hills and founded in 1999.
- BlueSky Software in California, started in 1988, closed in 2001.
- Brainstorm in Irvine, California. Publisher for games like Drawing Discoveries and others.
- Digital Mayhem, an Interplay development studio that ported Giants: Citizen Kabuto to the PS2 and developed Run Like Hell.
- FlatCat
- Interplay Films, a division of Interplay Entertainment, was formed in 1998 and was supposed to develop seven of the company's most popular video game titles into movies, including Descent, Redneck Rampage and Fallout. Its president was Tom Reed.
- Interplay Sports, located in Beverly Hills, was the internal sports division at Interplay. The division was founded in 1995 as VR Sports, but changed its name in 1998.
- MacPlay ported games to Mac OS from 1990 to 1997. The brand was licensed to United Developers, LLC in 2000.
- Shiny Entertainment in Laguna Beach, California, founded in 1993, acquired in 1995, sold to Atari in 2002. It later merged with The Collective to form Double Helix Games in 2007.
- Tantrum Entertainment, founded in 1996, used as a publishing name for Die by the Sword, Heart of Darkness, and Descent 3.
- Tribal Dreams, a developer that only finished one game, Of Light and Darkness. They were shut down in late 1998 in conjunction with the cancelled adventure game Star Trek: Secret of Vulcan Fury.
- V.R.T.O., founded in 1991 as Acme Interactive, sold to Malibu Comics in 1992 as Malibu Interactive, sold to GameTek in 1994 as Padded Cell Studios, acquired in 1997, shut down in 1998.
