= Star Trek: Secret of Vulcan Fury =

Cancelled Star Trek video game

- A print advertisement published in 1997 featuring character renders of Kirk, McCoy and Spock that were said to be "as they appear in the game."
- Developer: Interplay Entertainment
- Writers: D.C. Fontana; John Meredyth Lucas
- Platform: Microsoft Windows
- Release: Cancelled
- Genre: Action-adventure
- Mode: Single-player

Star Trek: Secret of Vulcan Fury is a cancelled action-adventure game, in development by Interplay Entertainment from 1997 until its cancellation in 1999. Based on the Star Trek: The Original Series license, the game would have followed Captain James T. Kirk and the crew of the USS Enterprise through a series of adventures regarding the Vulcan and Romulan races. Secret of Vulcan Fury was to have been the latest in a series of games produced by Interplay based on the license. It would have featured a control method similar to those seen in LucasArts games of that period, and nearly seven hours of full motion video capture using clay models.

The storyline was written by former Star Trek writer D.C. Fontana, while the script was created by John Meredyth Lucas. A promotional cereal competition was run in conjunction with Quaker Oats. Despite this promotion, the game was cancelled with estimates placing it at only 5% completion. The cast of The Original Series had already recorded their voices. Lead engineer Thom Robertson later explained the studio had underestimated the cost of the game and the difficulties in filming the clay models.

== Overview ==
The game was to be set in the 23rd century and across four independent stories which would have revolved around ancient secrets in the history of the Vulcan and Romulan races. The episodes allow the player to assume the roles of Captain James T. Kirk, Mr. Spock, Dr. Leonard McCoy, Lt. Hikaru Sulu, Ensign Pavel Chekov, and Engineer Montgomery "Scotty" Scott. The first episode was to involve the murder of a Romulan ambassador who was seeking to reunite the races, placing the player in control of Dr. McCoy initially.

The character that the player controlled would change as they progressed through the game. The creators sought to have the player control Spock during one of the Vulcan's mind melds. The ending of the game would have seen the player control Kirk, Spock and Chekov in an attempt to stop the titular superweapon. The interface for the game revolved around a menu which appears after the mouse button is held down while the cursor is hovering over an object. This was to prevent the need for controls to be shown on screen at all times, in a manner similar to LucasArts games of that period.

== Development ==
The game was announced by Interplay Entertainment on June 19, 1997, and was initially scheduled to be released on CD-ROM for Windows 95 in November 1997. Interplay had previously produced a number of Star Trek games, including Star Trek: 25th Anniversary, Star Trek: Starfleet Academy and Star Trek: Judgment Rites. The game was developed by Tribal Dreams, an in-house division of Interplay.

The storyline was written by D. C. Fontana, who was a writer on both Star Trek: The Original Series and season one of Star Trek: The Next Generation, and the script was directed by John Meredyth Lucas who had previously written and directed episodes of The Original Series. Fontana and Lucas had previously collaborated on the episodes "The Enterprise Incident" and "The Ultimate Computer". In writing the storyline, Fontana wrote dialogue for more puzzle branches than were planned by the developers. The entire main cast of The Original Series recorded their voices for the project. Brian Murray, who was hired to storyboard the game, suggested spinning the camera around the Enterprise crew as they used the transporter to merge their original location into their destination.

The game was expensive to create, and used motion capture techniques of clay models for the on-screen 3-D animation. The game used the same graphics engine both for normal gameplay and for cutscenes. The quality of the footage was described as similar to the cutscenes in Blade Runner (1997), but Tribal Dreams intended to remove the "robotlike stare" of the characters as seen in that game. Quaker Oats signed a promotional deal to feature the game on cereal boxes in a promotion beginning in April 1998, which featured both a competition to win a visit to one of the series sets and a $10 rebate for either Secret of Vulcan Fury or Starfleet Academy.

Secret of Vulcan Fury was cancelled in February 1999, following the continued departure of staff and because of financial problems at Interplay. During the production, three separate producers and the lead artist quit. At the time the project was shut down, it was estimated that less than 5% of the game had been completed. Lead engineer Thom Robertson later explained that the company had massively underestimated the cost of production, having expected to produce nearly seven hours of full motion video for 5% of the budget of a computer generated film such as Toy Story. They also had problems with the filming of the stop motion, as one three-day shoot was ruined when the director had red dots painted across the green screen in the hope that it would help with camera tracking. Further issues arose with the shoot as they had used a painted screen, which faded during the shoot causing problems in merging the video. Additional artists were then taken from other projects in order to mitigate those issues. The graphics designed for a Vulcan character were later used by artist Scott Bieser as a basis for the Klingon captain Klunk for the video game Star Trek: New Worlds.
