= Interplay Sports Baseball Edition 2000 =

1999 baseball video game

- Developer: Interplay Sports
- Publisher: Interplay Entertainment
- Platforms: PlayStation, Microsoft Windows
- Release: NA: March 31, 1999; EU: November 1999 (PC)
- Genre: Sports
- Modes: Single player, multiplayer

Interplay Sports Baseball Edition 2000 is a baseball video game developed and published by Interplay Entertainment for PlayStation (as Interplay Sports Baseball 2000) and Microsoft Windows in 1999. This is the first game released after the developer changed its name from VR Sports to Interplay Sports.

== Gameplay ==
The game uses motion capture of the baseball players, including their stretches. The bottom of the screen has statistics from 1998 baseball games in a format similar to real television. The gameplay is similar to VR Baseball '99, but with an improvement to the 3D graphics. People have an option to design their players. The modes are exhibition, season, tournament, playoffs, and home run derby. Players can be traded and team lineups can be changed. The voice of the announcer, the audience, and sound effects are presented in Dolby surround sound. The pitch speeds are slow, medium, or fast. Mike Carlucci voices the announcer and he had the same role in the video game MLB 2000. The game used one public-address announcer during a time that its competitors were switching to two commentators as featured on real baseball game broadcasts.

== Reception ==
Reception

Aggregate score
Aggregator	Score	
Aggregator	PC	PS
GameRankings	51%	65%

Review scores
Publication	Score	
Publication	PC	PS
AllGame	2/5	3/5
Computer Games Strategy Plus	2/5	N/A
Computer Gaming World	1.5/5	N/A
Electronic Gaming Monthly	N/A	5/10 (Note: In Electronic Gaming Monthly's review of the PlayStation version, one critic gave it a score of 5.5/10, two critics gave it each a score of 5/10, and the other gave it 4/10.)
Game Informer	N/A	5/10
GameFan	N/A	85% (Note: In GameFan's viewpoint of the PlayStation version, one critic gave it a score of 89, and the other 80.)
GameSpot	5.5/10	4.9/10
IGN	5/10	8.4/10
Official U.S. PlayStation Magazine	N/A	2/5
PC Accelerator	5/10	N/A
PC Gamer (US)	34%	N/A
PCMag	2/5	N/A

The game received mixed reviews on both platforms according to the review aggregation website GameRankings.

Ryan MacDonald of GameSpot said of the PlayStation release, "Baseball 2000 feels, plays, and looks just the way its name sounds: generic. The game fails to offer anything innovative in any category." Game Informer, in a review of said console version, said, "The stadiums and player models are fairly decent, but we couldn't help but be frustrated and disappointed with the game as a whole." Air Hendrix of GamePro said that the "sim-style action" of the same console version "makes for the kind of ballpark that could appeal to hardcore baseball fans looking for a realistic game, especially if Triple Play 2000's glamorous homerfest turned you off and MLB 2000 didn't strike your fancy. However, this diamond's definitely still in the rough, and many gamers won't be patient enough to tolerate its shortcomings. Rent it before you shell out for a full-price admission." (Note: GamePro gave the PlayStation version two 4/5 scores for graphics and control, and two 3.5/5 scores for sound and fun factor.)

Michael E. Ryan of GameSpot said of the PC release, "Of all the baseball games on the market, Interplay's VR Baseball series has consistently been one of the most promising and most disappointing." AllGame said that the PC version's visuals are "stunning", but that it is "simply a bad game". PC Gamer wrote, "Easily the worst of this year's crop of baseball games." Joel Strauch of GamePro said that the same PC version featured "a lot of creative extras, including a tournament mode in which players can draft their own all-star team and create a player to see how your guy stacks up against the pro--both in games and in the leader board in the Home Run Derby. But, then again, these extras--and the realistically reproduced players and stadiums--can't keep Baseball Edition 2000 from being more than a minor league hit." (Note: GamePro gave the PC version 4/5 for graphics, two 2.5/5 scores for sound and fun factor, and 3/5 for control.)
