= Mechanized Assault & Exploration 2 =

1998 video game

- Developer: Interplay Productions
- Publisher: Interplay Productions
- Platform: Microsoft Windows
- Release: NA: June 29, 1998; EU: 1998
- Genres: Real-time strategy Turn-based strategy
- Modes: Single-player, multiplayer

M.A.X. 2: Mechanized Assault & Exploration (known in Europe as M.A.X. 2: Mechanised Assault & Exploration), or simply M.A.X. 2, is a 1998 hybrid real-time/turn-based strategy video game developed and published by Interplay Productions. It's a sequel to Mechanized Assault & Exploration.

== Reception ==
Reception

Aggregate score
Aggregator	Score
GameRankings	57%

Review scores
Publication	Score
AllGame	3/5
CNET Gamecenter	4/10
Computer Games Strategy Plus	2.5/5
Computer Gaming World	2.5/5
Game Informer	7.25/10
GameSpot	5.3/10
IGN	3.7/10
Next Generation	4/5
PC Gamer (US)	40%
PC Zone	79%

The game received mixed reviews according to the review aggregation website GameRankings. Next Generation, however, said, "Will the new M.A.X. satisfy die-hard fans of the original? Probably not. Some players may be hoping for more than the new game delivers. But with or without die-hards, M.A.X. 2 is a solid combat/strategy game that is bound to make numerous new friends."
