= Super Runabout: San Francisco Edition =

2000 video game

- Developer: Climax Entertainment
- Publishers: JP: Climax Entertainment; NA: Interplay Entertainment; EU: Virgin Interactive
- Director: Koji Takahashi
- Designer: Toshiaki Sakai
- Series: Runabout
- Platform: Dreamcast
- Release: Super Runabout: JP: May 25, 2000; San Francisco Edition: NA: October 24, 2000; EU: November 24, 2000; JP: June 21, 2001
- Genre: Racing
- Mode: Single-player

Super Runabout: San Francisco Edition, known in Europe as Super Runabout: The Golden State, is a racing video game developed by Climax Entertainment and released for the Dreamcast in 2000. It is part of the Runabout series.

== Development ==
Released in Japan as Super Runabout (スーパーランナバウト, Sūpā Rannabauto), it is the first iteration of the series for the Dreamcast. An updated version was made and released in the U.S. as Super Runabout: San Francisco, possibly for easier name recognition and to be more commercially friendly. It was released in PAL regions as Super Runabout: The Golden State and finally in Japan again as Super Runabout: San Francisco (the updated version).

== Reception ==
Reception

Aggregate score
Aggregator	Score
Metacritic	65/100

Review scores
Publication	Score
AllGame	3/5
Edge	6/10
Electronic Gaming Monthly	8/10
Famitsu	31/40
Game Informer	8/10
GameFan	70%
GameSpot	5.4/10
GameSpy	6/10
IGN	(US) 6.2/10 (JP) 6.1/10
Next Generation	3/5

The game received "mixed" reviews according to the review aggregation website Metacritic. Greg Orlando of NextGen said, "Mindlessly fun and often breathlessly destructive, Interplay's car-wreck opus Super Runabout succeeds in spite of its graphics and control issues. There are clipping and collision problems galore, and some of the game's vehicles handle like an oiled sled on ice, but the game remains both eminently enjoyable and highly playable." In Japan, Famitsu gave it a score of 31 out of 40. GameFan gave the game an above-average review about two months before its U.S. release date.
