= Track Meet =

1991 video game

- North American cover art
- Developer: Interplay Productions
- Publishers: Interplay Productions; Hiro (Japan)
- Designers: Michael Quarles; Brian Fargo; Rebecca Ann Heineman
- Composer: George Alistair Sanger
- Platform: Game Boy
- Release: NA: 1991; EU: 1992; JP: 14 February 1992
- Genre: Olympic sports
- Modes: Single-player, multiplayer

Track Meet, known in Japan as Track Meet: Mezase! Barcelona (トラックミート めざせ!バルセロナ), is a sports video game that was released for the original Game Boy. In Germany the game was released as Litti's Summer Sports (endorsed by Pierre Littbarski).

== Gameplay ==
Pole vault is one of the events available.

The game offers seven different events in the spirit of the 1992 Summer Olympic Games in Barcelona, Spain. There are five different opponents to compete against in events like long jump, the 100-meter dash, and weightlifting. Each competitor has his own strengths and weaknesses that either help or hinder his performance on certain events. Once a competitor has more points than his opponents, he becomes the grand champion of the Summer Olympic Games.

== Development and Release ==
According to developer Rebecca Heineman, Track Meet was initially planned as a basic Microsoft Decathlon clone and a North American Game Boy launch title. When Interplay learned of Konami's competing Track & Field port, the team delayed the release by several months to completely redesign the game and introduce distinct characters, causing it to miss the Game Boy's launch window..

== Reception ==
The German video gaming magazine Power Play gave Track Meet an overall rating of 75 out of a possible 100 points.
