= Crazy Cars: Hit the Road =

2012 racing video game

- Developer(s): Little World Entertainment
- Publisher(s): Anuman
- Platform(s): PC, iOS, Android
- Release: 15 October 2012
- Genre(s): Racing
- Mode(s): Single-player, multiplayer

Crazy Cars: Hit the Road is a racing video game published by Anuman under their Microïds brand and developed by Little World Entertainment. Microïds was granted the license by Interplay Entertainment, who would subsequently begin promoting the game as well. The game, based on a former property owned by Titus Interactive, features free play and career mode in an arcade-based experience. Available for PC, iOS and Android, the game was released on October 15, 2012.
