= Stonekeep: Bones of the Ancestors =

2012 video game

Stonekeep: Bones of the Ancients
- Developer: Alpine Studios
- Publisher: Interplay Entertainment
- Platform: WiiWare
- Release: 2012
- Mode: Single-player

Stonekeep: Bones of the Ancestors is a video game by American developer Alpine Studios and published by Interplay Entertainment for the Nintendo Wii in 2012. The game is the second game released in the Stonekeep series, although it is not Stonekeep 2, a game that was cancelled after five years of development, but rather a new game based on the original. The game was released through the WiiWare the online distribution system, Interplay's second game of the kind, after MDK2 HD, to positive sales, but largely negative critical reception.

== Plot ==
The game once again focuses on the ancient city of Stonekeep, which was saved by the protagonist's ancestors after being ruined by a dark god's magic. With the city once again in danger, the protagonist must step up to defend his home.

== Gameplay ==
The game allows for players to wield melee weapons to fight enemies in addition to using projectiles. "Magic" is also available to use to attack enemies, allowing players to cast compound spells. After defeating monsters, players are given the ability to take loot. The player travels through seven different dungeons in which they must avoid traps, fight monsters and use a variety of weapons and magic. The player is also allowed to pick a companion with whom he/she can save Stonekeep.

== Reception ==
Despite positive sales, the game garnered overwhelmingly negative reception. Nintendo Life criticized its "laughably outdated" graphics, story, and overly complicated gameplay being simply a "pain to play". The reviewer would recommend the player pick up the original version of Stonekeep, which he/she would claim to be a better buy.
