= Star Reach (video game) =

1994 video game

- Developer: Interplay
- Publisher: Interplay
- Platform: DOS
- Release: December 22, 1994
- Genres: strategy game, shoot 'em up, 4X
- Modes: Single-player and multiplayer

Star Reach is a hybrid strategy and action science-fiction game for DOS released by Interplay in 1994. It was published as Space Federation in Europe.

The purpose of the game is to lead one of seven species (humans and six other alien species) in a race to rule the contested space.

It received mixed reviews, with reviewers generally finding it an uninspired mix of several contemporaneous video games.

== Plot ==
The game is set in the 23rd century, when representatives of seven spacefaring civilizations (Xanbari, Cynod Legion, Braquellians, Kathodians, Solonates, Z'nn, and humans) gather to negotiate the future of the galaxy. The talks collapse into conflict after a dispute escalates and the planet hosting the negotiations is accidentally destroyed. With diplomacy broken, the various races begin a war for dominance, each seeking to control the entire galaxy. The player assumes the role of one faction's leader and must expand its territory through colonization, economic development, and military conquest while resisting rival empires attempting to do the same.

== Gameplay ==
Space Federation is an unusual hybrid of turn-based and real-time strategy which have led the game to be described as both turn-based and real-time. For example, one reviewer noted that "the game is divided into quickly successive turns", while another wrote that the game "runs in real time". Players control one of seven competing interstellar civilizations and attempt to dominate their region of space. Gameplay is organized into twenty-two missions (scenarios) that take place on two-dimensional maps, each of which sports several planets with different resources and climates. The default victory conditions are to capture every planet or destroy enemy headquarters, although these can be altered by specific scenarios, which can require, for example, the colonization of X planets. Up to four competing factions can compete in each scenario, with multiplayer mode for two players supported by a split-screen hotseat mode.

Each faction begins with at least one inhabited world—typically a capital—and a flagship (Imperial Star Cruiser) used to conduct operations beyond the home planet. Instead of large galactic maps common in titles such as Master of Orion, the game focuses on a limited number of closely spaced planets, which shifts emphasis toward faster, more action-oriented gameplay. The broad outline remains the same, as players must manage resources, expand to new planets, constructing planetary infrastructure, managing economic indicators such as population, food, minerals, and finances, and build fleets capable of exploration, colonization, and combat, with the eventual goal of defeating rival factions.

Throughout the game, the player manages planetary economies by balancing several indicators, including economy, population, minerals, and food. Colonies can construct various buildings such as factories, mines, spaceports, biospheres, and hydroponic facilities to support population growth, ship production, and resource extraction. Colonization of new worlds is carried out by troop transport ships, after which additional infrastructure must be developed to sustain the colony.

Military forces consist of different types of spacecraft, including fighters, destroyers, bombers, missile carriers, and support vessels. Fleet combat occurs when opposing forces meet near contested planets, often followed by orbital bombardment and ground assaults using colonization ships carrying troops. Defensive structures such as satellites and planetary bases can be deployed to protect important worlds. In total, the game features ten different unit types and seven ground structures.

A distinctive feature of the game is that the player must personally pilot the flagship between planets and join space battles in arcade-style sequences using direct controls, introducing a real-time action-style element unusual for a strategy title. Crucially, ship and building production or repair requires manual orders at each planet and cannot be automated.

== Reception ==
Reception

Review scores
Publication	Score
Computer Gaming World	2/5
Next Generation	2/5
PC Gamer (UK)	70%
Świat Gier Komputerowych	65/100
Gry Komputerowe	7/10
Electronic Games	B+
PC Games	54/100

Subpar reviews from Computer Gaming World and Next Generation concluded that, world-building elements aside, Star Reach was not innovative to its genre.

Electronic Games praised the game's fast pace, distinctive alien factions with varied artificial intelligence behavior, and strong sound design. Computer Gaming World appreciated the split-screen two-player mode, fast-paced soundtrack, digitized voice updates, and effective AI, although it criticized the user interface, arcade-style combat (stressing the difficulty of real-time unit control combined with a small view window and player ship fragility), graphics, and lack of unique combat units between the different races. The reviewer also noted that production micromanagement causes information overload in large scenarios without automation. Świat Gier Komputerowych praised the game's accessible mechanics and overall strategic framework but criticizes several design choices. In particular, the need to manually pilot the flagship between planet was awkward and unnecessary, with cumbersome control resulting in accidental killings of allies. Other criticisms include weak graphics, uneven music, performance slowdowns during play, and artificial intelligence that can become aggressive early in the game.

Some sources appreciated, and were even fascinated, by the split-screen multiplayer, particularly two players acting simultaneously. On the other hand, Next Generation reported the mode "usually boil[s] down to who hits whom first". Electronic Games specifically criticized the decision to have it be a single-computer split-screen rather than network or modem play.

PC Gamer acknowledged the game's accessible design and numerous scenarios offering a variety of missions, and decent enemy AI, but concluded that it fell short of its potential. In particular, he noted a lack of strategic depth due to a limited unit roster, which he felt results in only one viable tactic for most missions. The arcade element in which the player controls their flagship was assessed as dull, and somewhat annoying due to the units' fragility. He also opined that the game had mediocre graphics and sound effects. PC Games also criticized the title's uninspired presentation, weak graphics, and incomplete manual.
