= Of Light and Darkness: The Prophecy =

1998 video game

- Developer: Tribal Dreams
- Publisher: Interplay Entertainment
- Director: David Riordan
- Producer: Brian F. Christian
- Designer: Cliff Johnson
- Programmer: Eric Whelpley
- Artists: Todd J. Camasta; Wes Burian; Gil Bruvel
- Writers: Kenneth Melville; David Riordan
- Composers: Steve Gutheinz; Kenneth Melville
- Platform: Microsoft Windows
- Release: NA: April 1, 1998; EU: 1998
- Genre: Point-and-click adventure
- Mode: Single-player

Of Light and Darkness: The Prophecy, also known as simply Of Light and Darkness, is a first-person point-and-click adventure video game developed by Tribal Dreams and published by Interplay Entertainment in 1998.

== Plot and gameplay ==
Of Light and Darkness: The Prophecy is a point-and-click adventure game. The player's goal in the game is to prevent a global apocalypse by redeeming the cursed spirits that are attempting to start various possible disasters. Once all possible disasters are prevented, by redeeming all the spirits, the player must defeat the dark lord Gar Hob.

== Development ==
The game was published by Interplay Entertainment and developed by Tribal Dreams. The game featured art by Gil Bruvel, an award-winning artist. Of Light and Darkness ran on the EDEN engine, developed by Heartland Enterprises. The game was displayed at the 1996 Electronic Entertainment Expo (E3) in June. Its visuals were created by Gil Bruvel, a surrealist fine artist from France. It also appeared at E3 1997.

Actors Lolita Davidovich and James Woods did voice lines and motion capture for the game. Davidovich played the character Angel Gemini while Woods played the role of Gar Hob.

== Release ==
Before its original release, retailers such as Costco announced they would be refusing to carry the game due to its box art. Made by Bruvel, it featured the character Angel Gemini nude in a fetal position. Interplay's Vice President of sales Kim Motika criticized the decision, finding it hard to comprehend retailers selling games like Tomb Raider and claiming Of Light and Darkness's box art is too provocative. Members of Interplay did, however, say that their ad campaign could have turned off family oriented chains. In December 2016, the game was re-released on GOG.com.

== Reception ==
Reception

Aggregate score
Aggregator	Score
Metacritic	58/100

Review scores
Publication	Score
CNET Gamecenter	7/10
Computer Games Strategy Plus	3/5
Computer Gaming World	4/5
EP Daily	7/10
Game Informer	5.5/10
GameRevolution	D+
GameSpot	6.9/10
Next Generation	2/5
PC Gamer (US)	67%
PC PowerPlay	60%

The game received "mixed" reviews according to the review aggregation website Metacritic. Next Generation said of the game, "Imagine combining the realtime elements of The Last Express and the graphic style of Zork Nemesis with the play mechanics of Myst. It's an intriguing idea, but not one that will keep anyone sitting in front of a computer for more than a day or two." Aaron Curtiss from Los Angeles Times praised the visuals, calling "The Village of the Damned" area "a psychotic Disneyland".

The game was a major commercial flop.

In 2012, Complex called the ending of the game one of the worst endings for a video game.
