= VR Baseball '97 =

1997 video game

- Developer: VR Sports
- Publisher: Interplay Productions
- Series: VR Baseball
- Platforms: PlayStation, Microsoft Windows
- Release: PlayStation: NA: April 1, 1997; EU: September 1997; Windows: NA: 1997
- Genre: Sports
- Modes: Single-player, multiplayer

VR Baseball '97 is a baseball video game developed by VR Sports and published by Interplay Productions for PlayStation. It was released in early April 1997, and was later ported for Microsoft Windows as VR Baseball: Hardware Accelerated in late 1997.

== Reception ==
Reception

Aggregate score
Aggregator	Score
GameRankings	59%

Review scores
Publication	Score
CNET Gamecenter	7/10
Computer and Video Games	3/5
Electronic Gaming Monthly	5/10
Game Informer	7.75/10
GameFan	64%
GamePro	3.5/5 (Note: GamePro gave the PlayStation version two 3.5/5 scores for graphics and overall fun factor, and two 4/5 scores for sound and control.)
GameRevolution	B
GameSpot	(PC) 6.7/10 (PS) 3.6/10
IGN	7/10
Next Generation	2/5

VR Baseball '97 received mixed reviews. Next Generation said, "while VR Baseball '97 has most of the pieces in place to be a great baseball game, the slow pace of play [...] and the dismal frame rate keep this game in the minors."
