= VR Soccer =

1996 video game

- Developer: Gremlin Interactive
- Publisher: VR Sports
- Platforms: PC, PlayStation, Sega Saturn
- Release: JP: October 4th, 1996; NA: December 20th, 1996

VR Soccer (also known as VR Soccer '96) is a soccer video game developed and published by VR Sports for the PC, PlayStation, and Sega Saturn.

== Gameplay ==
VR Soccer features Interactive Motion Technology developed by Interplay, which involves motion capture to add movement.

== Reception ==
Reception

Review scores
Publication	Score
AllGame	4/5 (MAC)
Next Generation	3/5 (PC)

Next Generation reviewed the PC version of the game, rating it three stars out of five, and stated that "there are lots of perks. The camera pans from different views during play, and at any point, you can replay the action from nearly anywhere in the stadium. There's also multiplayer support and other options. It's a good sim, just not the best."
