= Y2K: The Game =

1999 video game

- Developer: Runecraft
- Publisher: Interplay Entertainment
- Producers: Patrick Armstrong (Runecraft); Steve Baldoni (Interplay)
- Designer: Stephen Lodge
- Programmer: Steve Round
- Artist: Andy Sutcliffe
- Platform: Windows
- Release: December 1999
- Genre: Adventure
- Mode: Single-player

Y2K: The Game is a point-and-click adventure game developed by Runecraft and published by Interplay Entertainment in 1999. Notable actors involved in the game include Michael Bell, Tony Jay, Grey DeLisle, Dan Castellaneta, Danny Mann and John Mariano.

== Plot ==
Dharke Manor had been built in 1866 and refurbished in the 1920s by Aleister Dharke. After his death, his company used his house as an electronics laboratory eventually advancing on to robotics, cybernetics and AI. With their experiments on the brink of compromise, the Aleister company was able to get a lowly accountant to pass the property on to Buster Everman. Buster's girlfriend Candace realises what he is getting himself into and heads to the manor to save him from the mad Y2K computer.

== Release ==
Interplay intended to launch the game by December 1999 to coincide with the upcoming Year 2000 problem that was prophesied.

== Reception ==
Reception

Aggregate score
Aggregator	Score
GameRankings	50.80%

Review scores
Publication	Score
GamePro	3/10
GameSpot	6.7/10
IGN	5.7/10

Review aggregator website GameRankings assigned a score of 50.80%, based on 5 reviews. Barry Brenesal, for GamePro, was highly critical of the game, describing the graphics as "lamentable", with the player character looking more like a "manikin rather than a human". He also found the puzzle design to be unintuitive. IGN's reviewer thought "rather mediocre graphic adventure that most fans of the genre should probably do without".
