= VR Sports Powerboat Racing =

1998 video game

- Developer: Promethean Designs Ltd.
- Publisher: Interplay Productions
- Platforms: PlayStation, Microsoft Windows
- Release: EU: March 1998 (PS); NA: April 9, 1998
- Genre: Racing (Powerboating)
- Modes: Single-player, multiplayer

VR Sports Powerboat Racing is a racing game developed by British studio Promethean Designs Ltd. and published by Interplay Productions division VR Sports in North America in 1998. Game Boy Color and Nintendo 64 ports were planned for release in the 2000s, but were later canceled.

== Gameplay ==
VR Sports Powerboat Racing is a racing game where players choose from 16 craft with different engine sizes and handling. The game utilizes water physics, causing the boats' handling to be affected by turbulence and other boats' wakes. Up to four players are supported via a split screen.

== Reception ==
Reception

Aggregate score
Aggregator	Score	
Aggregator	PC	PS
GameRankings	N/A	41%

Review scores
Publication	Score	
Publication	PC	PS
AllGame	N/A	3/5
CNET Gamecenter	7/10	2/10
Electronic Gaming Monthly	N/A	3.625/10 (Note: In Electronic Gaming Monthly's review of the PlayStation version, one critic gave it 2/10, another gave it 4.5/10, and the rest gave it each a score of 4/10.)
Game Informer	N/A	6/10
GameFan	N/A	78% (Note: In GameFan's viewpoint of the PlayStation version, one critic gave it a score of 83, and the other 73.)
GameRevolution	B−	D
GameSpot	4.4/10	2.7/10
Next Generation	N/A	2/5
Official U.S. PlayStation Magazine	N/A	1/5
PC Gamer (US)	41%	N/A

VR Sports Powerboat Racing met with mostly negative reviews. The PlayStation version held a 41% on the review aggregation website GameRankings based on five reviews. Critics razed the visuals for the cheap-looking water spray effects, dramatic pop-up which makes obstacles and even walls invisible until the player is too close to avoid them, and most especially the upward-angled camera view, which causes the bulk of the screen to be occupied with blue sky and leaves the player little view of the actual course. Next Generation speculated, "If only the game had more control over camera placement, it might have earned an extra star."

Other common criticisms included oversensitive controls and an annoying voice-over commentator. The four reviewers of Electronic Gaming Monthly unanimously considered the game atrocious, with John Davison stating that it "takes the term 'bad' to completely new and previously uncharted territory." GameSpot were also firmly negative in their assessment, summing up, "There simply isn't a good side to this title." While sharing some of their criticisms, GamePro saw more of a bright side, offering praise for the selection of play modes and the intensity of the races. They concluded, "All told, Powerboat works fine as a poor man's Wave Race [64] for PlayStation gamers. It's plenty fun at first, but [it] wears thin because of the flaws in graphics and controls. We're talking rental all the way here." (Note: GamePro gave the PlayStation version three 3.5/5 scores for graphics, control, and fun factor, and 2.0/5 for sound.)

Reviewing the Windows version, GameSpot further criticized that of the four controller options, a steering wheel is the only one which works even mildly well, and ridiculed the fact that name entry is done using a scrolling alphabet despite keyboards being a standard accessory on PCs. The reviewer concluded that even playing a car racing game and pretending it is taking place on water would be a better option for a boat racing game than VR Sports Powerboat Racing.
