= Star Trek Pinball =

1998 video game

- Developer: Sales Curve Interactive
- Publisher: Interplay Entertainment
- Producers: Dan Llewellyn, Fred Royal
- Platform: DOS
- Release: NA: February 17, 1998; EU: 1998
- Genre: Pinball video game
- Modes: Single-player, multiplayer

Star Trek Pinball is a pinball video game based on the Star Trek franchise, developed by Sales Curve Interactive and published by Interplay for DOS in 1998. It could be purchased by itself or bundled with Starfleet Academy.

== Gameplay ==
The game can be played at 800x600 or 640x480 resolutions, and uses a 3D viewpoint. The controls of the game are not remappable.

There are three tables: "To Boldly Go" where the player experiences some of the world of James T. Kirk; "Qapla'" played as a Klingon warrior; and "Nemesis" which is a two-player only table with one player as the Federation, and the other as the Klingons. On "Nemesis" the table is split vertically and both players have a set of flippers to control their half of the table, but players may choose to hit a ball into their opponents half of the table. The game includes multiballs.

== Development ==
The game claimed to offer both local and LAN multiplayer on its box, but the network play was removed before the game shipped.

While gamepads could be used to control the game, support for the two trigger buttons (most commonly used for the flippers) was omitted.

== Reception ==
Reception

Aggregate score
| Aggregator | Score |
|---|---|
| GameRankings | 55% |

Review scores
| Publication | Score |
|---|---|
| CNET Gamecenter | 7/10 |
| Computer Games Strategy Plus | 1/5 |
| Computer Gaming World | 1.5/5 |
| GameSpot | 5.2/10 |
| GameStar | 48% |
| Next Generation | 1/5 |
| PC Gamer (US) | 39% |
| PC Games (DE) | 71% |
| PC Zone | 57% |
| Gamezilla | 40% |

The game received unfavorable reviews. Next Generation said, "In the end, Star Trek Pinball is one to be avoided – at least until it hits the bargain bins." Computer Games Strategy Plus found the game to be awful with tables at a terrible viewing angle and the sound effects "annoyingly repetitive". GameSpot criticized the layout of the single player tables and found the game uninspiring, concluding "Star Trek Pinball boldly goes where no pinball game should ever have ventured".
