= Jetfighter: Full Burn =

1998 video game

- Developer: Mission Studios
- Publisher: Interplay Entertainment
- Series: Jetfighter
- Platform: MS-DOS
- Release: NA: July 8, 1998; EU: 1998
- Genre: Combat flight simulator
- Modes: Single-player, multiplayer

Jetfighter: Full Burn is a combat flight simulator video game developed by Mission Studios and published by Interplay Entertainment for MS-DOS in 1998.

== Reception ==
Reception

Aggregate score
Aggregator	Score
GameRankings	65%

Review scores
Publication	Score
Computer Games Strategy Plus	3/5
Computer Gaming World	3.5/5
GamePro	3.5/5
GameSpot	6/10
GameStar	57%
Hyper	78%
PC Gamer (US)	74%
PC PowerPlay	67%
PC Zone	68%

The game received mixed reviews according to the review aggregation website GameRankings.
