= Dragon Dice (video game) =

1997 strategy video game

- Developer: Interplay Entertainment
- Publisher: Interplay Entertainment
- Platform: Windows
- Release: 1997
- Genre: Strategy
- Modes: Single-player, multiplayer

Dragon Dice is a video game based on TSR's collectible dice game Dragon Dice, developed and published by Interplay Entertainment in 1997.

== Development ==
The game was in development as early as 1995. It was released on ENGAGE Games Online in July 1997, an online multiplayer game service that was spun off by Interplay in 1996.

== Reception ==
Reception

Review scores
Publication	Score
AllGame	2.5/5
CNET Gamecenter	7/10
Computer Games Strategy Plus	2.5/5
Computer Gaming World	2.5/5
Game Informer	7.5/10
GameSpot	5.4/10
Next Generation	1/5
PC Gamer (US)	55%
PC Games (DE)	32%
PC PowerPlay	71%

The game received mixed reviews. Next Generation said, "Fans of the tabletop version of Dragon Dice would be better off finding a friend and using their money to purchase additional sets of real dice. It's a lot more fun than playing on the computer, and there's never a worry about the game crashing."

GameSpy's retrospective said that "Interplay's Dragon Dice was an absolutely faithful translation" of the tabletop game, "meaning that players enjoyed the thrilling experience of watching video representations of dice roll around on a screen. At least when you play craps on the Internet, there's a chance of winning real money. The only reason to even own Dragon Dice was to get the exclusive collectable die that came bundled in the package – which isn't even a reason today as there are very few Dragon Dice players around."
