= Renegade Racers =

1999 video game

- Developer: Promethean Designs
- Publisher: Interplay Entertainment
- Platforms: PlayStation, Microsoft Windows
- Release: PlayStation: EU: 1999; NA: March 9, 2000; UK: March 17, 2000; Windows: NA: February 4, 2000; EU: 2000
- Genre: Racing
- Modes: Single player, multiplayer

Renegade Racers is a racing video game developed by Promethean Designs and published by Interplay Entertainment for PlayStation and Windows in 1999–2000.

== Development ==
The game was first announced for the Nintendo 64 under the name Wild Water World Championships. This version was later cancelled, with development shifting to the Dreamcast, PlayStation, and Windows. The Dreamcast port was also cancelled, with the game eventually releasing for PlayStation and Windows between 1999 and 2000.

== Reception ==
Reception

Aggregate score
Aggregator	Score	
Aggregator	PC	PS
GameRankings	74%	N/A

Review scores
Publication	Score	
Publication	PC	PS
AllGame	N/A	2.5/5
IGN	7.5/10	4.5/10
Jeuxvideo.com	13/20	N/A
PlayStation Official Magazine – UK	N/A	3/10
PC Gamer (UK)	66%	N/A

The PC version received average reviews according to the review aggregation website GameRankings.
