= Draconus: Cult of the Wyrm =

2000 video game

Draconus: Cult of the Wyrm Dragon's Blood
- North American cover art
- Developer: Treyarch
- Publishers: NA: Crave Entertainment; EU: Interplay Entertainment
- Producer: Christopher A. Busse
- Designer: Mark Nau
- Programmer: Peter T. Akemann
- Artist: Chris Soares
- Composer: David Logan
- Platform: Dreamcast
- Release: NA: June 23, 2000; EU: June 30, 2000
- Genre: Hack and slash
- Mode: Single-player

Draconus: Cult of the Wyrm, known in Europe as Dragon's Blood, is a hack and slash video game developed by Treyarch and published by Crave Entertainment for the Dreamcast game console. Draconus is considered as a spiritual sequel to Treyarch's swordfighting PC game Die by the Sword.

== Gameplay ==
Draconus is a third-person hack and slash. Since defense is a more important part of the gameplay than attack, developers changed the usual behavior of constant blocking, and changed that block is neutralized after a successful enemy hit. This way the player has to pay more attention to their character and their blocking.

Draconus is set in a medieval fantasy world divided into 15 separate stages, and each level takes around one hour to complete. Accession through the stages is linear, although the player is presented with a choice, in certain moments, which of two next levels to complete first. This choice does not affect the storyline in any way, but can be refreshing in future play-throughs. Some of the stages are protected by the boss.

Player can choose between two playable characters, a male warrior Cynric and a sorceress Aeowin. Cynric is proficient with a wide range of melee weapons and has tough defense, but lacks in magic. On the other side, Aeowin is a skilled magic user, but uses sword and shield only as a last resort. Although each class provides unique gameplay, character choice does not affect the storyline.

Both characters can use magic, though the sorceress possesses a natural advantage in this area. Like in many role-playing games, warrior is easier to play early on, while the sorceress proves its usefulness in later stages of the game. The warrior, also, lacks healing spells, which makes the ending of the game quite difficult.

After every stage the player is taken to the character upgrade screen, where earned points can be spent on new abilities. The character is awarded a fixed number of points regardless of enemies killed and side quests solved, but additional points can be obtained by finding hidden blessings.

== Plot ==
A catastrophic event called the Backlash threw the world into chaos many years ago. Vile creatures roam throughout the lands, summoned by the evil shaman Rakka who is in pursuit of powerful ancient magic items. Amidst this backdrop a new mystery reveals itself in the form of a new race, the Draconus. The player is presented with the task of uniting all races and defeating the forces of evil.

== Reception ==
Reception

Aggregate score
Aggregator	Score
GameRankings	73%

Review scores
Publication	Score
AllGame	3.5/5
CNET Gamecenter	5/10
Electronic Gaming Monthly	7/10
Eurogamer	7/10
Game Informer	7.75/10
GameFan	(MVS) 71% 59% (Note: In GameFan's viewpoint of the game, three critics gave it each a score of 57, 59, and 60.)
GamePro	4.5/5 (Note: GamePro gave the game three 4/5 scores for graphics, sound, and control, and 4.5/5 for overall fun factor.)
GameSpot	8.2/10
GameSpy	5/10
IGN	6.7/10
Next Generation	3/5
RPGFan	79/100

Jeff Lundrigan of Next Generation said, "There's a highly playable game lurking under the choppy surface, and with persistence you might still enjoy it a lot. On the other hand, it screams for another few months of playtesting and tuning."
