= Soulbringer =

2000 video game

- Developer: Gremlin Interactive
- Publishers: NA: Interplay Entertainment; PAL: Infogrames
- Composer: Patrick Phelan
- Platform: Windows
- Release: NA: July 7, 2000; PAL: 2000
- Genre: Fantasy RPG
- Mode: Single-player

Soulbringer is a fantasy RPG developed by Gremlin Interactive and published by Interplay Entertainment and Infogrames in 2000. It was later packed and shipped in combination with Interplay's Planescape: Torment.

== Plot ==
The game starts off with the story of a young man arriving in a town called Madrigal to find his uncle Andrus, who is the man's only remaining family member after his father died. The protagonist is soon caught in the middle of strange bandit activity around town and then drawn into escalating political and supernatural strife across the world. During the game, it is revealed that the hero is a reincarnation of a powerful being whose purpose is to defeat a group of ancient demons known as Revenants. Even though forgotten, the Revenants are secretly standing behind all major conflicts and problems encountered. The hero has to reawaken his past-life powers, travel to parallel worlds and ultimately trap the Revenants within the mystical Well of Souls.

The game includes both a good and an evil ending.

== Gameplay ==
A player battles a NPC and wins, gaining XP.

The game is 3D with a helicopter POV.

For the combat system, each weapon has a set of possible moves, with more powerful moves becoming available as points are put into the "combat" skill.

The game includes a novel magic system. Rather than having reflexively opposing categories of magic, Soulbringer's magic system is circular: Air suppresses earth, which suppresses spirit which suppresses water, which suppresses fire, which suppresses air. Considerable strategy is thus needed to achieve a desired balance within the elements.

Spells are obtained from spellbooks that are unlocked by runes; more powerful spells become accessible as points are put into the "magic" skill. A spell's power depends on magic skill and on strength within the elements that make up the spell.

Each move and spell requires a certain amount of time to prepare and execute (including drawing the weapon, if necessary). Motion capture was used to display such actions for added realism. Soulbringer also takes terrain and placement into account (e.g. spiders on the ground can only be hit by "low" attacks while an enemy soldier higher up on a hill can only be hit by "high" attacks).

Combinations of attacks and spells can be preset and assigned to a hot key.

== Reception ==
Reception

Aggregate score
Aggregator	Score
GameRankings	68%

Review scores
Publication	Score
AllGame	3.5/5
CNET Gamecenter	7/10
Computer Games Strategy Plus	3.5/5
Computer Gaming World	2.5/5
Game Informer	6.5/10
GamePro	3.5/5
GameRevolution	B−
GameSpot	6.6/10
GameSpy	55%
GameZone	7/10
IGN	7/10
Next Generation	2/5
PC Gamer (US)	72%
RPGFan	94%

The game received "average" reviews according to the review aggregation website GameRankings. Eric Bratcher of NextGen criticized the graphics, gameplay, camera and looting system, but gave positive remarks to game's combat and voice acting.

The game was not a great seller for Interplay Entertainment.
