= Virtual Deep Sea Fishing =

1998 video game

- Developer(s): Taff System
- Publisher(s): ROK: Taff System; NA: Interplay Entertainment
- Platform(s): Windows
- Release: ROK: 1998; NA: 1999
- Genre(s): Sports (Fishing)
- Mode(s): Single-player

Virtual Deep Sea Fishing is a 1998 fishing video game by Korean developer Taff System, released in English-speaking countries in 1999 by Interplay Entertainment. The game is part of the publisher's Nakksigwang series of fishing video games, and the first to be distributed outside of South Korea.

== Gameplay ==
Players can choose one of twelve locations to fish, and eight boats to fish from, each with unique qualities such as length, beam and speed which influences the gameplay. The game focuses on larger fish, of which there are eighteen to catch, including sharks, each with different difficulties and attributes in behaviour, appetite and size. Catching fish in Virtual Deep Sea Fishing requires the player to consider bait, position, activity in the radar and underwater camera. The player catches fish by using a combination of mouse and arrow keys. The game has a passive fishing mode and a tournament mode with time limits to catch certain numbers of fish or fish of certain qualities to pass to the next round. The game also features a gallery mode to display the fish that the player has caught.

== Reception ==
Reception

Review scores
| Publication | Score |
|---|---|
| IGN | 3.3 |
| PC PowerPlay | 63% |
| PC Player | 40% |

Reviewers for IGN critiqued the graphical presentation and gameplay, stating "the scenery is identical" across locales, that there are limited "hints, clues or visual indicators (to) tip you off to the areas were fish are", and the fishing model is "depressing" due to the lack of skill involved with casting and limited movement once the fishing pole is in the water. In a milder review, Ed Dawson of PC PowerPlay praised the game, stating it "pulls of this simulation very well" and was "mildly relaxing" to play, although noted its "overly simplistic, essentially bland gameplay".
