= Sandwarriors =

1997 video game

- Developers: Astros Productions; Gremlin Interactive
- Publisher: Interplay Entertainment
- Platform: DOS
- Release: EU: May 1997
- Genre: Action
- Mode: Single-player

Sandwarriors is a 1997 video game developed by Astros Productions and published by Interplay Entertainment. The game is a combat/flight simulator.

== Gameplay ==
Sandwarriors is a sci-fi game set in 6225 BC on a distant desert planet, where two warring factions battle for control of a mysterious timegate leading to Earth. Players take on the role of a soldier for the House of Osiris, piloting a spaceship and using various weapons to ensure their faction wins the war. The game features 3D cockpit-based combat with visuals, detailed environments, and special effects. Sandwarriors includes preset flight maneuvers.

== Development ==
Sandwarriors was first mentioned in September 1996.

The game was developed by Astros Productions, a company founded in 1982. It uses an advanced 3D engine called 3D ALITY.

In June 1997, Gremlin and VideoLogic partnered to release the game on PowerVR-enhanced PCs.

== Reception ==
Reception

Review scores
Publication	Score
Edge	7/10
Electric Games	80%
PC Joker	57%
PC Zone	7.4/10
Power Play	55%
PC Review	7/10
PC Games	C+
The Press	3/5

PC Zone gave the game a score of 7.4 out of 10 stating "It's not a bad game by any means; it simply just doesn't distinguish itself from the pack. As Ron Pickering used to say to the losing team on the programme We Are The Champions, that's just 'hard lines".

Games Domain said "SandWarriors would have been a good action game. As it is, there are too many flaws to make it worth buying".
