= Star Trek: Judgment Rites =

1993 video game

- Developers: Interplay Productions; MacPlay (Mac OS)
- Publisher: Interplay Productions
- Producers: Jacob R. Buchert III; Bruce Schlickbernd
- Designers: Jayesh Patel; Bruce Schlickbernd; Michael A. Stackpole; Elizabeth Danforth; Scott Bennie; Mark O'Green
- Programmers: Paul Allen Edelstein; Jay Patel
- Artist: Todd J. Camasta
- Composers: Richard Band; Rick Jackson
- Series: Star Trek
- Platforms: MS-DOS, Macintosh
- Release: November, 1993 (DOS); 1995 (Mac/DOS CD-ROM)
- Genre: Adventure game
- Mode: Single player

Star Trek: Judgment Rites is a computer game first produced by Interplay Productions in 1993, featuring the original cast of the classic Star Trek in a series of new adventures, including one featuring Trelane, the omnipotent child from the original episode "The Squire of Gothos". Judgment Rites uses the same MS-DOS game engine as the earlier Star Trek: 25th Anniversary; however, it had sharper graphics and sound, particularly with the CD-ROM edition. All of the initial cast members provided voices for their characters on the game in that edition. William Campbell also reprised his guest role as Trelane.

The game is a change from the previous game in the series, Star Trek: 25th Anniversary, in that at least half the missions are part of an ongoing story arc, and one is a direct sequel to the final mission of the previous game. The space battle sequences are now completely optional, with adjustable difficulty. It was designed by Bruce Schlickbernd and Jayesh J. Patel, with scenarios by Michael A. Stackpole, Scott Bennie, Mark O'Green, and Liz Danforth. The canceled 1997 game Star Trek: Secret of Vulcan Fury notwithstanding, this game marks the last time DeForest Kelley played the role of Leonard McCoy. It is also the last time the original Star Trek principal cast appeared in its entirety in a Star Trek production.

A special commemorative edition of this game was released on CD with several items, including a copy of the classic series episode "The City on the Edge of Forever" and a commemorative pin symbolizing one of the missions.

== Gameplay ==
Gameplay is similar to that of Judgment Rites's predecessor, Star Trek: 25th Anniversary. The player controls Captain Kirk of the USS Enterprise, and interacts with Spock, McCoy, and other crewmembers while solving eight "episodes" on and off the ship. Combat sequences, in which the Enterprise battles enemies in space, are optional unlike those in the first game.

== Plot ==
Throughout the story arc, the Enterprise crew attempts to go on shore leave, but are often waylaid by the many missions of the scenarios, as if they were part of a "to be continued" story not often featured in Star Trek, due to the greater story arc. They are not seemingly random missions.

1. Federation – The Enterprise is confused by a rift in space-time that deposits a heavily damaged Federation starship before it. The ship, the USS Alexander, reports that it has returned from 8 days in the future, where the Federation has been destroyed, just before the ship explodes. The crew of the Enterprise must discover the cause of the destruction and prevent it from happening.
2. Sentinel – A Federation science ship, observing a primitive race on an alien world, is suddenly scanned from the planet. The Enterprise is called in to investigate.
3. No Man's Land – The Enterprise is dispatched to search an area where several Federation starships have disappeared without explanation. When they arrive, Kirk and crew are confronted by Trelane (from original series episode "The Squire of Gothos"), the self-styled "Baron of Gothos" who now believes himself to be a World War I German Fokker pilot. After a battle with the triplane, Kirk must stop Trelane, find the missing ships and discourage Trelane's interest in war once and for all.
4. Light and Darkness – The Enterprise is sent to answer a distress call on a barren planet, home to only two forms of life, two rival single cell species. Kirk is confronted by holographic emissaries, of an angelic, aesthetically pleasing, civilized species, and a loathsome, ugly "demon" race. Kirk must convince these emissaries to somehow live in harmony.
5. Voids – The Enterprise is assigned to chart the Antares Rift, a particularly dangerous region of space where the normal laws of Space-Time are shifting and chaotic. When the ship is crippled and Spock is kidnapped by a Vurian, an ancient and extinct race that died out during the time Zefram Cochrane completed test trials of the first Warp Drive, Kirk must go where no man has gone before to save his ship and his friend.
6. Museum Piece – The Enterprise and its crew have finally been granted shore leave and are headed to Nova Atar to spend it. As they approach, a Starfleet admiral asks Kirk to preside over a diplomatic function at the Smithsonian Annex while he is there. Kirk agrees, but things turn out to be more exciting than they expected when the Museum is attacked by terrorists with unknown motives. With only their wits and the machines on display, they must resolve the situation before the terrorists escape.
7. Though this be Madness.... – The Enterprise is summoned to the Klingon Neutral Zone when a massive alien ship arrives and announces its intent to land on top of a major population center. Complicating things, a Klingon battlecruiser has arrived as well, and its captain insists on boarding the ship. Kirk must stop the ship from landing, as well as avoid provoking the Klingons, who will be watching his every move.
8. ...Yet there is Method in it. – The ship has been prevented from landing, but a new mystery awaits. The builders of the ship want to make contact with the Federation, but only if Kirk can pass a series of philosophical tests to prove his worth.

== Expansion pack ==
The Movie & Sound Pack is an expansion pack for Judgment Rites which, advertisements said, "expand[ed] the experience with fantastic new cinematic sequences and digitized sound effects from the original television series".

== Collector's Edition ==
A Star Trek: Judgment Rites – Collector's Edition was issued in 1995. It included a CD-ROM with a 20-minute interview of Star Trek creator Gene Roddenberry. The interview took place in 1988 as part of a Star Trek: The Next Generation – Behind The Scenes special television presentation.

== Reception ==
Reception

Review score
Publication	Score
Electronic Entertainment	9 out of 10

Award
Publication	Award
Electronic Entertainment	Game of the Month

Together with 25th Anniversary, Judgment Rites sold more than 300,000 copies by April 1994. Computer Gaming World in March 1994 said that "The individual adventures are far more interesting" than that of 25th Anniversary, and liked the "nicely upgraded" graphics. The magazine concluded that although experienced adventurers would finish the game quickly, "it would be a shame for Star Trek fanatics to miss out on Judgment Rites". Charles Ardai said in April 1994 that Judgment Rites "is a better game in any number of ways" than its predecessor, with optional and less combat, more and larger episodes, a unified plot thread, and bigger roles for supporting characters.

Judgment Rites was a runner-up for Computer Gaming World's 1993 "Adventure Game of the Year" award, which ultimately went to Gabriel Knight: Sins of the Fathers and Day of the Tentacle (tie). In 1996, Computer Gaming World ranked it as the 96th best PC game of all time, calling it "the first Star Trek game that truly captured the feel of the original episodes." In 1994, PC Gamer UK named it the 43rd best computer game of all time. The editors wrote, "Previous Star Trek titles failed miserably, but this one shows how well it can be done when the designers treat the subject with the respect it deserves." That same year, PC Gamer US named Judgment Rites the 44th best computer game ever.

In 2011, Adventure Gamers named Judgment Rites the 58th-best adventure game ever released. In 2017, PC Gamer ranked Judgment Rites among the best Star Trek games. In 2020, Screen Rant ranked Judgment Rites as the seventh best Star Trek game. In 2021, Den of Geek said that "Judgment Rites" was done so well it was worthy of being a good "final season" of the television show, praising the writing and gameplay.
