= Solitaire Deluxe =

1995 video game

- Developer: Presage Software
- Publisher: Interplay Entertainment
- Platform: Windows
- Release: 1995

Solitaire Deluxe, also known as Solitaire Deluxe For Windows, is a 1995 video game developed by American studio Presage Software and published by Interplay Entertainment.

== Gameplay ==
Solitaire Deluxe is a game in which players can explore two dozen different Solitaire tableaus, each offering unique rules and scoring variations. Players can play casually by selecting any game or enter into a structured Tournament mode that strings multiple games together for extended play. Classic favorites like Klondike, Monte Carlo, and Pyramid are included, alongside more intricate options such as Spider, Calculation, and Osmosis. Players can choose from 18 themed decks, ranging from traditional designs to Japanese and Mayan styles, and even personalize the playing surface with colorful backgrounds or their own bitmap images.

== Development ==
The game was developed by Presage Software, a company founded in 1986.

== Reception ==
Reception

Review scores
Publication	Score
Power Play	58%
PC Gamer	75%
The Electric Playground	8/10

CNET said "Still, what Solitaire Deluxe for Windows lacks in history, it makes up for in games".

The Oregonian said "With a selling price of less than $30, "Solitaire Deluxe" should find plenty of desk-top card players eager to add to their Windows game library. And the success of yet another solitaire game will ensure that other publishers will continue to develop even more versions of this game that already comes with most computers".
