= Invictus (video game) =

2000 strategy role-playing video game

Invictus: In the Shadow of Olympus
- Developer: Quicksilver Software
- Publisher: Interplay Entertainment
- Platform: Microsoft Windows
- Release: NA: March 2, 2000; EU: 2000
- Genres: Real-time strategy Role-playing video game
- Modes: Single-player, multiplayer

Invictus: In the Shadow of Olympus, also known as simply Invictus, is a video game developed by Quicksilver Software, Inc. and published by Interplay for Windows in 2000.

== Reception ==
Reception

Aggregate score
| Aggregator | Score |
|---|---|
| GameRankings | 51% |

Review scores
| Publication | Score |
|---|---|
| AllGame | 3.5/5 |
| CNET Gamecenter | 3/10 |
| Computer Games Strategy Plus | 2/5 |
| Computer Gaming World | 1.5/5 |
| EP Daily | 5/10 |
| Eurogamer | 6/10 |
| GameFan | 70% |
| GameSpot | 4.7/10 |
| GameSpy | 73% |
| GameZone | 9/10 |
| IGN | 5.9/10 |
| Next Generation | 2/5 |
| PC Accelerator | 6/10 |
| PC Gamer (US) | 59% |

The game received mixed reviews according to the review aggregation website GameRankings. Eric Bratcher of NextGen said, "This is a brilliant idea for a game, but until the characters learn to walk and follow orders, don't buy into this myth." Barry Brenesal of GamePro said, "If everything in Invictus worked as claimed, it would be a pleasantly different take on the RTS genre. It's got replayability, humor, three difficulty levels, good game balance and decent voiceovers. But there's too much that's broken here, so that you end up playing against the code as much as you play against your computerized enemies. I can't say whether Poseidon cursed the product before release or not, but if it doesn't get a serious bug-fix, it's doomed to a watery grave." (Note: GamePro gave the game two 3/5 scores for graphics and sound, 2.5/5 for control, and 2/5 for fun factor.)
