= The Adventures of Rad Gravity =

1991 video game

- Developer: Interplay Productions
- Publisher: Activision
- Designers: Brian Fargo; Michael Quarles
- Programmers: Brian Fargo; Michael Quarles
- Artist: Bruce Schlickbernd
- Composers: David Warhol; George Sanger
- Platform: Nintendo Entertainment System
- Release: NA: January 1991; PAL: May 30, 1991
- Genre: Platformer
- Mode: Single-player

The Adventures of Rad Gravity is a 1991 platform video game developed by Interplay and published by Activision for the Nintendo Entertainment System.

== Reception ==
Reception

Review score
Publication	Score
Electronic Gaming Monthly	4/10, 4/10, 3/10, 6/10

The Adventures of Rad Gravity received generally positive reviews, and Simon Burns of VoxelArcade called it 'one of the most interesting and innovative of NES games' in a retro feature. The title music is regarded as one of the worst in video game history.
