= VR Baseball '99 =

1998 video game

- Developer: VR Sports
- Publisher: Interplay Entertainment
- Platform: PlayStation
- Release: NA: May 22, 1998; EU: January 1999
- Genre: Sports
- Modes: Single-player, multiplayer

VR Baseball 99 is a video game developed by VR Sports and published by Interplay for PlayStation in 1998.

An enhanced version of the game for Microsoft Windows, VR Baseball 2000, was released in October 1998.

== Reception ==
Reception

Aggregate score
Aggregator	Score
GameRankings	70%

Review scores
Publication	Score
AllGame	3.5/5
Electronic Gaming Monthly	7.125/10
Game Informer	7/10
GameFan	89% (Note: In GameFan's early viewpoint of the game, one critic gave it 89, and the other 88.)
GamePro	4/5 (Note: GamePro gave the game two 4/5 scores for graphics and overall fun factor, 3/5 for sound, and 4.5/5 for control.)
GameSpot	5.3/10
Next Generation	3/5
Official U.S. PlayStation Magazine	3.5/5

The game received above-average reviews according to the review aggregation website GameRankings. Next Generation said, "It may not be as complex as MLB '99, but VR Baseball will provide several hours of simple, clean, baseball pleasure."
