= Rock & Roll Racing 2: Red Asphalt =

1997 video game

- European cover art
- Developer: Interplay
- Publisher: Interplay
- Platform: PlayStation
- Release: PAL: December 26, 1997; NA: January 13, 1998
- Genres: Racing, vehicular combat
- Modes: Single-player, multiplayer

Rock & Roll Racing 2: Red Asphalt is a 1997 racing game developed and published by Interplay for the PlayStation. Rock & Roll Racing 2: Red Asphalt is the sequel to Rock n' Roll Racing. In North America it was stripped of its association with the series and retitled simply Red Asphalt.

== Reception ==
Reception

Review scores
Publication	Score
Electronic Gaming Monthly	5.25/10
GameSpot	6.9/10
IGN	5/10
Next Generation	2/5

The game received mostly mediocre reviews. Josh Smith of GameSpot described it as an interesting and innovative title, citing the track design and use of weaponry in addition to driving, though he criticized the upgrade system as being illogical at points and an overt determining factor in the player's combat performance. However, most critics asserted the opposite, characterizing Red Asphalt as a generic and derivative title which makes no meaningful change from earlier futuristic shoot-em-up racers such as Wipeout and Crash 'n Burn. Kelly Rickards wrote in Electronic Gaming Monthly, "I've seen this game a million times before and so have you. Keep in mind, I'm not saying Red Asphalt is a bad game, but it is spectacularly average." Next Generation similarly commented, "Is Red Asphalt a bad game? Definitely not. It's just that for a game like this, Wipeout XL is the definite 'must-play' example. Fact is, if you happened to miss out on playing Red Asphalt, you probably wouldn't care."

Multiple critics complained about which vehicles slip into frustrating spinouts and the unnecessarily complex and confusing interface screen. Adam Douglas recounted in IGN, "The editors from the other sites gathered around to see if I could actually get the game to start, having been through this little Hellraiser cube puzzle the day before." Most considered the game's graphics impressive, though IGN described them as sloppy, citing extensive polygon clipping and lackluster effects, and Next Generation found them merely satisfactory. While finding the sound effects undistinguished and the controls difficult, GamePro felt Red Asphalt differentiated itself through its vehicle customization.

== Reviews ==
- GameFan #60 (Vol 5, Issue 12) 1997 December
- Official PlayStation Magazine #3 (1997 December)
- Power Unlimited - Feb, 1998
- Ultra Game Players - 1998
