= Omar Sharif on Bridge =

1992 video game

- Developer(s): Oxford Softworks
- Publisher(s): Interplay Productions
- Platform(s): Acorn Archimedes, Amiga, Atari ST, MS-DOS, Windows 3.1
- Release: 1992
- Genre(s): Strategy

Omar Sharif on Bridge is a 1992 video game published by Interplay Productions.

== Gameplay ==
Omar Sharif on Bridge is a game in which contract bridge is played with advice from actor Omar Sharif. Players access the menu options using a hotkey combination. The game focuses on both teaching and playing bridge. The digitized voice of Omar Sharif narrates the gameplay. The computer will give hints to players who are not sure how to bid.

== Reception ==
Johnny L. Wilson reviewed the game for Computer Gaming World, and stated that "Omar Sharif On Bridge is so easy to get into, challenging to play and well-designed in terms of interface that it is likely to become a permanent resident on our hard disks."

Tony Dillon for CU Amiga called it "an excellent package for the beginner" but warned that users would "grow out of it quickly" and rated it 74%.

Christina Erskine for PC Review rated the game 6 stars out of 10 and praised the game's "attractive presentation" and its options, saying it scored well as a package for beginners.

Richard C. Leinecker for Compute! recommended the game to serious bridge players having trouble finding opponents to play with or needing practice, stating "You'll face a reasonably good opponent, and you can get advice and learn more about the game."

John Sweeney for Page 6 called the game "a pretty good buy" for the average bridge player.
