= Legendary Wars: T-Rex Rumble =

2010 video game

- Developer(s): Interplay Entertainment
- Publisher(s): Interplay Entertainment
- Producer(s): Eric Caen
- Designer(s): Rob Stevens
- Composer(s): Jean-Marie Philibert
- Platform(s): Nintendo DSi
- Release: NA: June 21, 2010; EU: November 12, 2010
- Genre(s): Real-time strategy
- Mode(s): Single-player, multiplayer

Legendary Wars: T-Rex Rumble (known as ARC Style: Jurassic World in Japan) is a Real-Time Strategy video game released for the Nintendo DSi via DSiWare. The game was developed and published by Interplay Entertainment with the development of the game being made by just two men, Eric Caen and Rob Stevens.

== Plot ==
The game takes place in an alternate dimension where humans and dinosaurs existed at the same time. Players attempt to finish with more food than rival tribes.

== Development ==
When the concept of the game came up, Eric Caen first went to persuade Rob Stevens to join the development of the game. Due to Stevens wanting to make the game his way, he acted as a multi-role developer, making all of the tools, the game design, the engine, the code and supervised the art, sound effects & music. The final graphics of the game were done by MZone. The original graphics were scrapped as they were too cartoony and Stevens said that the game was a RTS and that he did not want to give people the wrong impression. For sound, music and other audio, Eric wanted somebody who could make music to match the game's visuals, for this they hired Jean-Marie Philibert. To make the music much cleaner and clearer on the DS, Interplay used streaming technology, a CRI Vibe. It took away memory but greatly improved the game's music quality. A port for iOS was initially planned, but was never released.

== Reception ==
IGN praised the game and compared it to Interplay's first DSi game—one of familiar theme and positive reviews: Prehistorik Man. Nintendo Life lamented the game's bugs, glitches, and lackluster artificial intelligence. Official Nintendo Magazine UK similarly criticized the game's bugs and glitches.
