= Start-Up (video game) =

2000 video game

- Developer(s): Monte Cristo
- Publisher(s): Monte Cristo
- Engine: Proprietary
- Platform(s): Windows
- Release: FRA: January 12, 2000; NA: September 1, 2000
- Genre(s): Strategy
- Mode(s): Single-player

Start-Up (also known as Start-Up 2000) is a PC video game in which players must try to build a successful business start-up from venture capitalists to IPO's. Start-Up is developed and published by Monte Cristo and distributed by Electronic Arts.
