= Jupiter Strike =

1995 video game

- North American PlayStation cover art
- Developer: Taito: Digital Dialect, Kinesoft (Win)
- Publishers: Taito: PlayStation; JP: Taito; NA/EU: Acclaim Entertainment Windows; JP: GameBank; NA: GT Interactive
- Director: Masayuki Soh
- Producer: Eiji Takeshima
- Composer: Shinichiroh Shinozaki
- Platforms: PlayStation, Windows
- Release: August 25, 1995: PlayStation; JP: August 25, 1995; NA: December 6, 1995; EU: December 1995 Windows; JP: 1996; NA: 1996
- Genre: Rail shooter
- Mode: Single-player

Jupiter Strike (Zeitgeist in Japan) is a 3D rail shooter game for the PlayStation developed by Taito. Taito published the Japanese version, while Acclaim published the American and European version. A Microsoft Windows version was also released in 1996. The player takes control of a futuristic fighter jet that has two main weapons. Unlike other shooters this game does not have any power ups. Instead the player's ship has a laser sub-weapon that homes into locked on targets. The player must battle against extraterrestrial ships which can range from small fighters to large mother ships.

== Reception ==
Reception

Review score
Publication	Score
Famitsu	6/10, 6/10, 6/10, 6/10

GamePro's brief review of the game stated that "No power-ups juice the action, but the absorbing combat and responsive controls don't need any help. Strike's graphics and sounds are too plain, though. A weekend's rental will see you through ..." Next Generation's reviewer agreed that the lack of upgrades and power-ups makes the game more dull, but further stated that "Jupiter Strike is noteworthy strictly for having almost no good qualities at all." He criticized the jerky control, uninspired enemy designs, and poor sound quality, and said that neither of the two view options gives the player an adequate view of incoming threats. He viewed the game as an indication that Acclaim may have wasted its money in the acquisition of exclusive rights to publishing Taito's games in the U.S., and gave it one out of five stars.
