= Time Gate: Knight's Chase =

1995 video game

- Developer: Infogrames Multimedia
- Publishers: EU: Infogrames Multimedia; POL: Mirage Software; NA: I•Motion
- Programmers: Frederic Barbier; Christophe Cotte; Denis Ferraton; Jean-Marc Morel; Christophe Nazaret
- Platforms: MS-DOS, Windows, Classic Mac OS
- Release: MS-DOS, Windows: POL: December 1995; EU: February 1996; NA: July 25, 1996; Mac OS: NA: 1997; EU: 1998
- Genre: Action-adventure
- Mode: Single-player

Time Gate: Knight's Chase (French: Time Gate: Le Secret du Templier), or simply Knight's Chase, is a puzzle-solving video game by Infogrames Multimedia released in 1995 for MS-DOS and Windows, the latter being a SVGA version released exclusively in North America. It was also released for Classic Mac OS in 1997.

The gameplay is similar to the Alone in the Dark series of games. The game uses a modified engine of the first three Alone in the Dark games, with Gouraud-shaded, rather than flat shaded, polygons.

Knight's Chase was the first game in a planned trilogy of Time Gate video games.

== Plot ==
William Tibbs, a young American man studying law in Paris, searches the newspapers to find signs of his girlfriend Juliette, who has been missing for a couple of days. One night from nowhere his room is attacked by a menacing dark knight with a view to killing William, but William quickly defeats him and the knight evaporates, leaving behind a ring without a stone and a mystical mirror through which William sees far into the past where Juliette is a prisoner in the hands of the evil inquisitor Wolfram. This is where the adventure begins, when William must find a way to go back in time to the 14th century, the era of the ancient Knights Templar, and to become a knight. Without properly understanding the twists and turns around him, William just wants to find Juliette and get back to modern times. But first he must defeat Wolfram and thus restore the glory of the Knights Templar.

== Reception ==
Maximum praised the game's mix of swordplay and puzzles, as well as the plot twists, but gave it an overall negative review due to its overt similarity to the Alone in the Dark series, commenting "The Alone in the Dark trilogy are undeniably great games, but after milking the genre dry surely a change of plan is necessary. Obviously not if Time gate [sic] is anything to go by, as it's more than just a tribute to the Edward Carnby adventures - it's practically identical." They also stated that the Gouraud-shaded characters look dated compared to texture-mapped characters, and scored the game three out of five stars. A reviewer for Next Generation instead complained of awkwardness resulting from the game's controls and limited number of camera angles, and criticized the developers for not including gamepad support. He further commented that though Alone in the Dark was a landmark game, Knight's Chase did not make enough improvement given the three years that had passed since then. He scored it two out of five stars.

Andy Butcher reviewed Time Gate for Arcane magazine, rating it a 7 out of 10 overall. Butcher comments that "polished though it is, Time Gate doesn't really offer anything new. If you're familiar with the Alone In The Dark series you won't be able to escape the feeling that you've seen all this before. Still, there's precious little to criticise, and it offers several hours of solid gaming."
