= VR Baseball 2000 =

1998 video game

- Developer: VR Sports
- Publisher: Interplay Entertainment
- Platform: Microsoft Windows
- Release: NA: October 2, 1998
- Genre: Sports
- Modes: Single-player, multiplayer

VR Baseball 2000 is a video game developed by American studio VR Sports and published by Interplay for Windows in 1998.

== Reception ==
Reception

Aggregate score
Aggregator	Score
GameRankings	67%

Review scores
Publication	Score
CNET Gamecenter	9/10
Computer Games Strategy Plus	3.5/5
Computer Gaming World	3/5
EP Daily	5/10
GameSpot	7.5/10
IGN	6/10
Next Generation	3/5
PC Accelerator	6/10
PC Gamer (US)	58%

The game received average reviews according to the review aggregation website GameRankings. Next Generation said, "Considering the fact that Interplay was working with an untested engine this year, VR Baseball 2000 is pretty promising, but in many ways it's still not quite there yet."
