= F/A-18E Super Hornet (video game) =

1999 video game

- Developer: Digital Integration
- Publisher: Titus Interactive
- Platform: Windows
- Release: EU: November 1999; NA: 2000
- Genre: Combat flight simulator

F/A-18E Super Hornet is a 1999 video game from Titus Interactive. The game was released in the United Kingdom in November 1999 and in North America in 2000. It simulates the F/A-18E Super Hornet fighter aircraft.

== Gameplay ==
F/A-18E Super Hornet is a flight simulation game that aimed to deliver a realistic experience of piloting the titular aircraft. The game features a flight model that reflects the stability and handling of the real Super Hornet. The simulation features significant interactive 2D cockpit detail, with nearly every switch and display operable via mouse. A 3D virtual cockpit is also available, and both are supported by detailed avionics and weapons systems. The weapons modeling includes a variety of air-to-ground munitions and missiles. The game simulates carrier operations deck crew activity roles and interactions. Training missions are comprehensive, guiding players through takeoff, navigation, and landing.

== Development and release ==
The game was originally announced for the Nintendo 64 in 1998 under the title Super Hornet F-18, however, the game only ended up releasing on PC platforms as F/A-18E Super Hornet in 2000.

== Reception ==
Reception

Review scores
Publication	Score
All Game Guide	3.5/5
Computer Gaming World	3/5
GameSpot	6.4/10
Eurogamer	7/10
PC Joker	72%
PC PowerPlay	63%
PC Player	66%

Tom Basham from Computer Gaming World gave the game a score of 3 out of 5, stating: "Timing may be SUPER HORNET's worst enemy, having arrived after JANE'S F/A-18. Although definitely a solid sim, it's somewhat eclipsed by Jane's representation of the F/A-18E, especially regarding the carrier landings, HARM missile operation, wingmen, and bad weather."
