= Wall Street Trader 2000 =

1999 video game

- Developer: Monte Cristo
- Publisher: Monte Cristo
- Series: Wall Street Trader
- Platform: Microsoft Windows
- Release: EU: 1999; NA: December 15, 1999
- Genre: Business simulation game
- Modes: Single-player, multiplayer

Wall Street Trader 2000, known in Europe as Wall Street Trader 99, is a video game developed and published by Monte Cristo for Windows in 1999. It is the third game in the Wall Street Trader series.

== Reception ==
Reception

Aggregate score
Aggregator	Score
GameRankings	73%

Review scores
Publication	Score
AllGame	2.5/5
CNET Gamecenter	2/10
Computer Games Strategy Plus	2/5
GameSpot	7.1/10
Next Generation	4/5
PC Accelerator	6/10
PC Gamer (US)	75%

The game received average reviews according to the review aggregation website GameRankings. Adam Pavlacka of NextGen said, "If you've ever wanted to play the stock market but never had the cash, this is the game for you. Featuring a minimalist interface, basic point-and-click controls, and a detailed economic model, Wall Street Trader 2000 is very close to the real thing – except you aren't risking real money."
