= Star Trek: 25th Anniversary (computer game) =

1992 PC video game

- North American DOS cover art
- Developers: Interplay Productions; Metadigm (Amiga); MacPlay (Mac OS)
- Publisher: Interplay Productions
- Producer: Bruce Schlickbernd
- Designers: Elizabeth Danforth; Jayesh J. Patel; Bruce Schlickbernd; Michael A. Stackpole; Scott Bennie
- Programmers: Jayesh J. Patel; Paul Edelstein
- Artists: Todd J. Camasta; David A. Mosher
- Composers: The Fat Man; Dave Govett
- Series: Star Trek
- Platforms: MS-DOS, Mac OS, AmigaOS
- Release: 1992 (DOS); 1993 (Mac OS); 1994 (Amiga); 1994 (DOS CD-ROM)
- Genre: Adventure
- Mode: Single-player

Star Trek: 25th Anniversary is an adventure video game developed and published by Interplay Productions in 1992, based on the Star Trek universe. The game chronicles various missions of James T. Kirk and his crew of the USS Enterprise. Its 1993 sequel, Star Trek: Judgment Rites, continues and concludes this two-game series.

The game was originally released on floppy disks. It was later rereleased on CD-ROM with expansions as well as enhanced audio including the entire principal cast of the original television series performing the game's dialogue.

== Gameplay ==
The player takes on the role of Captain James T. Kirk on board the USS Enterprise, a Starfleet vessel as seen in the American science fiction television series Star Trek: The Original Series. It is split into two main modes, a main bridge view, and a third-person mode whenever an away team is transported to a planet or space station. During several combat sequences the player controls the Enterprise in battle against enemies in space; originally required, Interplay later offered a patch making them optional.

The controls on the bridge are split across the crew, with Montgomery Scott allowing access to the shield and power controls, Pavel Chekov controlling navigation and weapons, Hikaru Sulu controlling the orbit of the ship, and Nyota Uhura enabling the player to send and receive messages. The away team always consists of Kirk, Spock and Leonard McCoy, as well as one of eight different redshirts, many of whom can die during the mission. The player interacts with these modes using a point and click interface via the mouse.

== Plot ==
The game was broken up into a series of episodes, with each episode opening with a message received in-game from Starfleet Command. They are typically structured to have a ship to ship combat before the game moves onto a third-person adventure game featuring an away team.

The Episodes are as follows:

1. Demon World: Settlers belonging to a religious sect have reported being attacked by "Demons" near their mines. Kirk must discover the truth behind these "Demons".
2. Hijacked: The USS Masada has not reported in. Upon investigation, The Enterprise discovers that the ship has been captured by Elasi Pirates who are holding the crew hostage. Kirk must discover a way to recover the ship and crew unharmed.
3. Love's Labor Jeopardized: Romulans have crossed the Neutral Zone and attacked the Federation Research Station Ark 7. Unfortunately, the attack has created a biohazard situation that Enterprise crew must deal with, as well as the Romulans.
4. Another Fine Mess.....: When responding to a distress call from a ship under attack by pirates, the Enterprise discovers none other than Harry Mudd is involved. He is traced to a derelict alien spacecraft. The Enterprise crew must discover the connection between the derelict, the pirates and Mudd.
5. Feathered Serpent: A Klingon battle fleet is about to cross into Federation space, in pursuit of a "War Criminal". The Enterprise must find this "War Criminal" to prevent a war.
6. That Old Devil Moon: Strange power readings have been detected from a large asteroid approaching a pre-warp star system. The Enterprise discovers an ancient nuclear missile base that does not realize that the war ended 1000 years earlier, and must prevent it from destroying the native civilization a second time.
7. Vengeance: The Enterprise, responding to a distress call from the USS Republic, finds it nearly destroyed. Kirk must figure out what destroyed the ship and stop those responsible from striking again. Unlike the other missions, this mission is longer and more complex in the CD version of the game; the original floppy version of this episode consists only of a brief away team segment followed by an extensive ship-to-ship combat sequence.

In the CD-ROM edition of the game, following the conclusion of the last mission is a title card memorializing Gene Roddenberry with a short voice over narration by William Shatner praising his life.

== Development ==
The game was initially released in 1992 for the PC on a series of 3.5" floppy disks, with a later release on CD-ROM adding improved sound effects and the voices of the actors from The Original Series. When the game was ported to the Amiga for a 1994 release, it was restricted to the Amiga 1200 and 4000 models with hard-drive only, which was uncommon at that time on these machines. It became available on a DOS emulator via archive.org in January 2015.

Following a deal with CBS, Star Trek: 25th Anniversary was subsequently re-released on the distribution network GOG.com, with additional German and French subtitles, on 7 May 2015 alongside Star Trek: Judgment Rites and Star Trek: Starfleet Academy for Microsoft Windows, macOS and Linux. Shortly after, Interplay Entertainment also re-released Star Trek: 25th Anniversary to the distribution network Steam, however, only for Microsoft Windows and without subtitles. Both sequels followed the game to Steam the day after, 8 May 2015, respectively. A fangame combining 25th Anniversary and Super Star Trek was released in 2023.

== Reception ==
Reception

Review scores
Publication	Score
Computer and Video Games	93%
Next Generation	4/5
ACE	940/1000
Amiga Computing	80%
Amiga Down Under	80%
Amiga Format	50%
Amiga Power	62%

Together with Star Trek: Judgment Rites, 25th Anniversary sold more than 300,000 copies by April 1994. 25th Anniversary by itself ultimately sold more than 350,000 units and was a commercial hit, according to PC Player. The original PC version of 25th Anniversary was received positively by the critics; the review in Computer Gaming World stated that 25th Anniversary was "the most outstanding Star Trek yet produced for the computer". The graphics and sound audio were praised, and concluded that "for this Trek-fanatic-turned-reviewer, [the game]'s major shortcoming is that it is over too soon". Frank O'Connor in his review for Computer and Video Games said that "this is the first one to deliver" on the promise of a good Star Trek game. He praised detailing of the sprites and the authentic music, calling it "one of the most involving and entertaining games of its type".

The reviews for the Amiga port were more mixed than the PC version, with criticism often directed at the shaky graphics and unresponsive interface. Simon Clays, for Amiga Computing described the video sequences as "jerky" and called the mouse controls "sluggish", but praised the missions which "require you to use at least a touch of your grey matter". In Amiga Format, Tim Smith called the graphics "juddery", and also criticised the hour-long install of the 9mb onto a hard drive. He did praise both the storylines and the puzzles seen in the game, adding that it should appeal to Star Trek fans but general Amiga gamers would look elsewhere. Dave Golder said in Amiga Power that the game was "dull" and that the adventure segments of the game were "routine", while the space sequences "came across like a bog-standard flight sim" but were "moderately exciting".

Charles Ardai of Computer Gaming World said in May 1994 that the television cast's voices on the CD version was "a little like getting a phone call from an old friend ... the original, as good as it was, can't hold a candle to the new version". He stated that the episodes' "feel is Star Trek through and through", mostly because of the added music and "layer upon layer of digitized bloops, whirrs, hisses, and clicks taken straight off the TV. Phaser fire sounds like phaser fire. Communicators trill the way communicators ought to". Ardai wished that Shatner, Nimoy, and Kelley did not sound so "oddly sedate" but believed that "Trekkers ... will be rapturously grateful to have them at all", and concluded "I can't imagine the Star Trek fan who will want to miss the CD version ... it may be one of the last chances we'll have to see the old crew work together again".

Next Generation reviewed the Macintosh version of the game, rating it four stars out of five, and stated that "If you like Star Trek, you've just gotta have this game."

Stew Shearer reviewed the game after its release on GOG.com in 2015, saying that the plots were "predictable, but a lot of fun" and praised the voice work conducted by the original actors. He said that to his surprise, the game was still "rather enjoyable".

25th Anniversary was nominated for Best Fantasy Roleplaying/Adventure Game at the Compute! Choice Awards in 1993, but lost out to Dune. It has been listed as one of the best video games of the franchise. Mike Fahey, while writing for Kotaku in 2009, listed the game as one of the three best alongside Star Trek: Voyager – Elite Force and Star Trek: Bridge Commander, saying that Star Trek games until the release of 25th Anniversary were "generally ho-hum affairs".

In 2016, Tom's Guide ranked Star Trek: 25th Anniversary (PC and Mac version for 1992) as one of the top ten Star Trek games.

== Sequels ==
Following the success of 25th Anniversary, Interplay developed a sequel entitled Star Trek: Judgment Rites. This was set up in the same manner as the original game, with it broken into a series of episodes and the split between the adventure game away team mode and the space combat/flight simulator mode using the same interface.

A fan game based on 25th Anniversary, titled Star Trek Fyne, was released for Windows by JH-Games. The first episode was released on December 27, 2010. A demo version of episode 2 has been released and episode 3 is also planned to be released. The plot of the first episode tasks the Enterprise to search for missing Andorian technicians. Chip magazine described it as a successful adventure game with exciting story and great attention to detail.
