= Star Trek: New Worlds =

2000 video game

- Developers: Binary Asylum; 14 Degrees East
- Publisher: Interplay Entertainment
- Producer: Doug Brandon
- Designers: Dan Kingdom; Daniel Levin
- Programmers: Richard L. Seaborne; Mark Phoenix; Kerry Sergent; Brad Dodge
- Artist: Todd J. Camasta
- Composers: Julian Soule; Inon Zur
- Series: Star Trek
- Platform: Microsoft Windows
- Release: NA: August 29, 2000; PAL: September 29, 2000
- Genre: Real-time strategy
- Modes: Single player, multiplayer

Star Trek: New Worlds is a strategy game published in 2000 by Interplay in which the player can choose to command the forces of the United Federation of Planets, Klingons or Romulans. The player's goal is to build successful colonies on a series of newly discovered planets while battling off competing factions.

== Storyline ==
Star Trek: New Worlds is set in the year 2287, shortly after the events of Star Trek V: The Final Frontier. In the opening cutscene, Captain Gibson of the USS Explorer receives orders from Starfleet Command to intercept the Romulan D'talla-class Warbird IRW Melak in the Neutral Zone, and prevent it from setting off an experimental weapon known as "Project Shiva". Although the Explorer is far too late to put a stop to the weapons test, a Klingon D-7 confronts the Melak in an attempt to steal the Shiva technology. The Melak commander instead launches the Shiva projectile at its test target, the shockwave destroying the Klingon ship. However, the weapon itself tears a hole in subspace and allows a huge number of new planets to enter (apparently out of nowhere); the Melak is caught in the gravity well of one such planet and crashes. These new planets are rich in natural resources, and the sector - which intersects Klingon, Romulan, and Federation territory, as well as the Neutral Zone - becomes known as the "Tabula Rasa" (Latin for "blank slate"). The three factions then fight for control of the vast untapped natural resources on these planets. Science scanning of ancient structures on one of the planets eventually awakens a dormant, mighty alien race called the Metar, which the three factions must band together against to overcome.

At the end of the game, the Tabula Rasa is sealed by the detonation of another Shiva device, and the planets return to their former dimension. However, at the very end of the game's final cinematic, several Metar ships are seen to have survived the detonation of the Shiva device, thus leaving room for a sequel. However, Interplay lost its claim to the Star Trek franchise, and no other gaming company seems interested in the New Worlds storyline.

== Gameplay ==
The player can choose between the Klingons, Romulans or the Federation to play as, and each race has 14 missions. Each mission has a certain amount of objectives, like mining certain resources, capture, protect or destroy certain buildings, build specific colonies at the Colony Site, which have to be completed in order to complete the mission.

The player's colony always starts out with only the Colony Hub as the command post and a Storage facility to store the processed minerals available, requiring the player to build/upgrade all other available buildings. But some missions give the player a slightly more developed colony to ease the job for accomplishing the missions. Buildings built later on in missions include construction yards, vehicle yards, resource processors, power generators, mining stations, science stations, security and arsenal facilities, sickbays, transporter pads, shield generators, defensive buildings such as photon turrets and static disruptors, food growing facilities, as well as living space for colonists. Military units built include APCs (Armed Personnel Carriers), phaser vehicles (Federation), disruptor battletanks (Klingons and Romulans), photon artilleries, and other specific vehicles to each specific race.

== Development ==
In the late 1990s, the British studio Binary Asylum – developer of Zeewolf – was approached by Interplay to develop a real-time strategy Star Trek game. First results were shown at the European Computer Trade Show (ECTS) in London in 1998. In the ECTS of 1999, the game was presented as almost complete. Late in 1999, Interplay stopped funding Binary Asylum, which immediately went bankrupt.

In October 1999, Interplay announced a port to the Sega Dreamcast with hints that online cross-platform games would be possible. The port never materialized.

Prior to the release, Interplay published mp3s of the game music on their homepage.

Fans of the game set up the "New Worlds Network", a web page dedicated to the game. On the site, the latest news, beta testing reports and official concept art was published.

== Reception ==
Reception

Aggregate score
| Aggregator | Score |
|---|---|
| Metacritic | 52/100 |

Review scores
| Publication | Score |
|---|---|
| AllGame | 3.5/5 |
| CNET Gamecenter | 4/10 |
| Computer Games Strategy Plus | 2/5 |
| Computer Gaming World | 1/5 |
| EP Daily | 8/10 |
| Eurogamer | 5/10 |
| Game Informer | 5/10 |
| GameRevolution | D |
| GameSpot | 4/10 |
| GameSpy | 65% |
| GameZone | 4/10 |
| IGN | 6.2/10 |
| Next Generation | 2/5 |
| PC Gamer (US) | 55% |

The game received "mixed" reviews according to the review aggregation website Metacritic. Doug Trueman of NextGen said, "Star Trek: New Worlds is caught in a temporal anomaly. Save your hard drive space for Star Trek: Dominion Wars." Brian Wright of GamePro said that the game was "by no means a bad game. Rather, it's a fairly standard 3D RTS game set somewhat awkwardly in the Star Trek universe. Trekkies might get a kick out of it, but anyone familiar with the RTS genre will probably be unimpressed." (Note: GamePro gave the game 4/5 for graphics, 4.5/5 for sound, 3.5/5 for control, and 3/5 for fun factor.)

In a preview piece on Star Trek: New Worlds in PC Zone, Mark Hill said that he was "pleasantly surprised" by the game because it was suitable for players who aren't fans of the franchise as well as the "slick and easy to use interface". But he added that there were "enough details here to send any die-hard Trekkie into convulsions of ecstasy." He praised the re-playability offered by the "elaborate" separate story-lines for the Romulans, Federation and Klingons, and described the graphics as "ambitious".

The German web portal golem.de did not recommend buying the game because the graphics lacked details and overall the game was not as convincing as Star Trek Armada.

The game sold more than 100,000 units.
