= Scott Bennie =

Canadian game designer

Robert Scott Bennie (June 24, 1960 – March 28, 2022) was a Canadian game designer.

== Early life ==
Scott Bennie was born on June 24, 1960 in Abbotsford, British Columbia, Canada. He was the son of teachers Jim and Alice Bennie. He attended Alexander Elementary, then Abbotsford Junior. He graduated from Abbotsford Senior in 1977, where he competed on the high school Reach For the Top team, and wrestling team, and was president of the student council.

Bennie became interested in role-playing games during his senior high school years, after he was introduced to them at VCON in Vancouver in 1977. He submitted articles to Dragon, made his first sale in 1981, and became a freelancer for TSR, Inc.

In 1981, Bennie encountered a game called Champions, which a friend brought back from Pacific Origins, where it debuted. He fell in love with it immediately. He reviewed Champions in Dragon, and eventually freelanced for Hero Games. He published his long-running Gestalt (Hero Games) campaign as a sourcebook for Blackwyrm Games.

In 1986, Bennie graduated with a Bachelor's degree in secondary education from the University of British Columbia.

== Career ==
Bennie was hired in the electronic game industry at Interplay Productions in 1990. He was one of the four designers on J.R.R. Tolkien's The Lord of the Rings, Vol. I, along with Jennell Jaquays, Troy Miles, and Bruce Schlickbernd. A review from Electronic Games stated that "The design quartet ... has produced a game capable of testing veteran players, but the difficulty is in the situations."

Bennie designed Castles (1991), which he produced in conjunction with developers from Quicksilver Software, and explained that they included a philosophy behind the role-playing elements in the game, and that Interplay had plans for future projects based on Castles. Bennie was one of the four writers on Star Trek: Judgment Rites (1993), along with Elizabeth Danforth, Mark O'Green, and Mike Stackpole, and a reviewer quipped that "I don't even want to guess how many episodes of the series the four writers ... must have watched and rewatched to get in the mood, but clearly they've been living and breathing the stuff, and the timbre and nuances are just right."

Bennie was one of the writers on Fallout (1997), with Chris Taylor and Mark O'Green, with the reviewer from Edge saying that "Fallout was a landmark title in many ways, but it stands out particularly as the only post-apocalyptic game with much sense of believability about its setting or characters. Should the world go to waste, this is probably what it would be like; embittered, desperate, suspicious survivors inhabit close-knit shanty towns or the remains of once-great cities, and power depends on who is able to forage for the most weapons. The whole game was narrated in a small text-box to the left of the screen, adding extra verbal colour to the game's desolate wasteland."

Bennie worked on Starfleet Command (1999), notably on a story arc in campaign mode that included missions which advance the storyline of the game. A downturn in the industry and management changes led to his departure from Interplay. He returned to Abbotsford.

Bennie wrote the d20 System campaign setting book Testament: Roleplaying in the Biblical Era (2003). A reviewer in 2007 stated that "Mr. Bennie clearly attempts to remain as neutral as possible when depicting the various cultures included in Testament. The product does not attempt to portray any culture as the "Good Guys" or the "Bad Guys." I do not claim to be an Old Testament scholar, though I have read it in its entirety. I found the cultural representations to be reasonably presented based on my passing knowledge of the OT."

== Personal life ==
On March 28, 2022, Bennie died MSA Hospital in Abbortsford at the age of 61 due to complications with pneumonia. He was buried in Hazelwood Cemetery in Abbotsford.

== Game credits ==
=== Hero Games ===
- Villainy Unbound (Villains book, editor/contributor, 1987)
- Champions in 3-D (Adventure book, contributor, 1988)
- Classic Enemies (Villains book, editor/contributor, 1989)
- Champions Universe (sourcebook, contributor, 1991)
- Day of the Destroyer (adventure, writer, 1992)
- VIPER (Sourcebook, co-author, 1993)
- VIPER: Coils of the Serpent, (co-author, 2003)
- Villainy Amok (adventure book, author, 2005)
- Champions of the North (sourcebook, 2008)

=== Adventurers Club ===
- "Nova" (Champions adventure, Adventurers Club #4, 1984)
- "Hands of the Strangler" (Justice, Inc. adventurer, Adventurers Club #10, 1987)

=== Blackwyrm Games ===
- Gestalt: the Hero Within (sourcebook, 2007)

=== Digital Hero ===
- Viper's Folding Nest (adventure, Digital Hero #1)
- Stars of Blood (adventure, Digital Hero #5)
- Demon O'War (character, Digital Hero #7)
- And There Was Blood Everywhere (adventure, Digital Hero #24)
- Leftover Hero (Villainy Amok outtakes, Digital Hero #30)

=== Dungeons and Dragons (TSR) ===
==== AD&D Dragonlance ====
- DL 15 Mists of Krynn (adventure, contributor, 1988)
- Otherlands (co-author, 1990)
- Wild Elves (author, 1991)

==== AD&D Forgotten Realms ====
- I14 Swords of the Iron Legion (contributor, 1988)
- FR10 Old Empires (author, 1990)

==== AD&D Greyhawk ====
- WG7 Castle Greyhawk (contributor, 1987)
- AD&D Monstrous Compendiums (TSR)
- MC 1 Monstrous Compendium 1 (Merman-Myconid monstrous entries, 1989)
- MC 2 Monstrous Compendium 2 (Orc - Remoraz, monstrous entries, 1989)

==== AD&D Ravenloft ====
- Islands of Terror (co-author, 1992)

==== Dragon Magazine (TSR) ====
- "Not a Very Nice Guy" (Bounty Hunter NPC, Dragon #52, 1981)
- "Champions" (Game Review, Dragon #57, 1981)
- "Setting Saintly Standards" (Saints article, Dragon #79, 1983)
- "Never the Same Thing Twice" (Rakshasa article, Dragon #84, 1983)
- "Avari" (Monster, Dragon #101, 1985)
- "For Sail" (Mariner NPC, Dragon #107, 1986)
- "Fun Without Fighting" (Dragon #117, 1987)
- "Quagmire" (Monster, Dragon #127, 1987)
- "Tibbit" (Monster, Dragon #135, 1988)
- "Diurge" (Monster, Dragon #141, 1988)
- "Good Does Not Mean Boring (Paladin article, Dragon #148, 1989)
- "Characterization Made Easy" (Dragon #156, 1989)

==== Dungeon Magazine ====
- "Threshold of Evil" (Dungeon #10, 1988)

==== D&D Miscellaneous ====
- AC 10 Bestiary of Dragons and Giants (contributor, 1987)
- AC 11 The Book of Wondrous Inventions (contributor, 1987)

==== D&D 3rd edition ====
- Mythic Vistas (Green Ronin)
- Testament (Green Ronin Publishing, author, 2003)
- Testament: The Hittites (Green Ronin Publishing, author, 2005)
- Eternal Rome (adventure, 2007)
- Mythic Vistas Derived Products

==== ENWorld Publishing ====
- The Tribulations of Kanah (ENWorld Player's Journal #2, 2002)
- Targum Magazine
- The Hekau-Adept (Testament NPC article, Targum #1, 2007)
- The Reign of Akhenaten, Part 1 (article, Targum #2, 2007)
- The Reign of Akhenaten, Part 2 (article, Targum #4, 2008)
- Cyborgladiators (Firefly Publishing)
- Cyborgladiator (contributor, 2004)
- Faery's Tale (Firefly Publishing)
- It Happened One Christmas (adventure, author, 2007)

==== Lord of the Rings (CODA, Decipher Publishing) ====
- Fell Beasts and Wondrous Magic (contributor, 2003)
- The Two Towers Sourcebook (co-author, 2003)

==== Marvel Superheroes ====
- Gamer's Handbook of the Marvel Universe 1 (contributor, 1988)
- Gamer's Handbook of the Marvel Universe 2 (contributor, 1988)
- Gamer's Handbook of the Marvel Universe 3 (contributor, 1988)
- Gamer's Handbook of the Marvel Universe 4 (contributor, 1988)
- Gamer's Handbook of the Marvel Universe Character Updates 1989 (contributor, 1989)
- Gamer's Handbook of the Marvel Universe Character Updates 1992 (contributor, 1992)

==== Mutants and Masterminds ====
- Agents of Freedom (sourcebook, 2006)
- Worlds of Freedom (Terminus article, 2008)
- Freedom's Most Wanted (Villains book, contributor 2008)

==== World of Warcraft ====
- Magic and Mayhem (contributor, 2004)
- More Magic and Mayhem (contributor, 2005)
- Alliance Player's Guide (contributor, 2006)
- Horde Player's Guide (contributor, 2006)
- Dark Factions (contributor, 2008)

==== Electronic Gaming ====
- Interplay Productions

==== The Lord of the Rings ====
- The Lord of the Rings, Vol I (producer, co-designer, 1990)
- The Lord of the Rings, Vol. II: The Two Towers (producer, co-designer, 1992)

==== Star Trek ====
- 25th Anniversary (co-designer, 1992)
- Judgment Rites (co-designer, 1993)
- Starfleet Academy – Starship Bridge Simulator (mission designer, 1995)
- Starfleet Academy (mission designer, 1997)
- Starfleet Command (mission designer, 1999)
- Starfleet Command II: Empires at War (mission designer, 2000)

==== Other titles ====
- Castles (producer/designer, 1991)
- Castles: The Northern Campaign (producer/co-designer, 1991)
- The Lost Vikings (writing contributions, 1993)
- SimCity: Enhanced CD-ROM (writing contributions, 1994)
- Descent (writing contributions, 1995)
- Stonekeep (contributor, 1995)
- Fallout (design assist, 1997)
- Descent to Undermountain (level designer, 1998)
- Invictus (co-designer, 2000)

==== Sony Entertainment ====
- Champions of Norrath (2004
