= Starfleet Command =

Starfleet Command may refer to:

== Video games ==
- Star Trek: Starfleet Command, a computer game based on the table-top wargame Star Fleet Battles
- Star Trek: Starfleet Command II: Empires at War, the sequel to Starfleet Command and second in the series of real-time space combat games
  - Star Trek: Starfleet Command: Orion Pirates, a stand-alone expansion for the computer game Star Trek: Starfleet Command II: Empires at War
- Star Trek: Starfleet Command III, a Star Trek video game published in 2002

== Other ==
- Starfleet Command, the headquarters of, the fictional Star Trek exploration agency
