= Star Trek: Tactical Assault =

2006 video game

- Developer: Quicksilver Software
- Publisher: Bethesda Softworks
- Producer: Cory Nelson
- Programmer: Otmar Schlunk
- Artist: Rantz A. Hoseley
- Composer: Jason Graves
- Series: Star Trek
- Platforms: Nintendo DS, PlayStation Portable
- Release: Nintendo DS: NA: October 26, 2006; EU: December 22, 2006; AU: 2006; PlayStation Portable: NA: November 14, 2006; EU: December 1, 2006; AU: December 7, 2006
- Genre: Real-time tactics
- Modes: Single-player, multiplayer

Star Trek: Tactical Assault is a Star Trek video game for the Nintendo DS and PlayStation Portable that was developed by Quicksilver Software, also the creators of Star Trek: Starfleet Command. The game is published by Bethesda Softworks, which published several other Star Trek games around that time. This would be the first game on a Nintendo platform to be published by Bethesda since the NES version of Home Alone in 1991.

== Gameplay ==
=== Single-player ===
There are two playable campaigns, each covering a range of missions. The Starfleet campaign is set in 2284 and predates the events of Star Trek II: The Wrath of Khan. The player follows the adventures of Lieutenant Commander Reynolds, completing missions and working up to better ships, from a small frigate to a Constitution-class starship and beyond. The Klingon campaign is set after the Khitomer Massacre of 2346.

In the single-player game, the Constitution- and Miranda-class Federation ships are playable, as well as the Klingon D7 and Bird of Prey. There is also a new Starfleet ship, designated as a dreadnought, with three nacelles and a body style similar to the Miranda class.

In campaign mode, strategy is used on battle, dialogs, and decisions. Depending your actions, you'll be awarded with a bronze, silver, or gold medal and 1, 2, or 3 upgrade points, respectively.

=== Multiplayer ===
Both handheld versions offer head-to-head battles between two players. There are roughly twenty playable ships from among five factions: Federation, Klingon, Romulan, Gorn, and Orion. The Nintendo DS version requires both players to own a copy of the game to compete in its multiplayer mode, which does not utilize online connectivity of any kind.

== Development ==
The game was announced in January 2006 when Bethesda acquired the rights to the Star Trek series of video games.

== Reception ==
Reception

Aggregate score
Aggregator	Score	
Aggregator	DS	PSP
Metacritic	63/100	64/100

Review scores
Publication	Score	
Publication	DS	PSP
GameRevolution	B	N/A
GameSpot	6.2/10	6.2/10
GameSpy	3/5	3/5
IGN	6/10	6.4/10
NGamer	62%	N/A
Nintendo Life	4/10	N/A
Nintendo Power	5.5/10	N/A
Nintendo World Report	4.5/10	N/A
PlayStation: The Official Magazine	N/A	6.5/10
X-Play	N/A	3/5
411Mania	7/10	N/A

The game received "mixed" reviews on both platforms according to the review aggregation website Metacritic.
