= Shanghai: Great Moments =

1995 video game

- Developer: Quicksilver Software
- Publisher: Activision: JP: Sunsoft
- Producer: Tom Sloper
- Series: Shanghai
- Platforms: Windows, Macintosh, Sega Saturn, PlayStation
- Release: Windows; March 1995; Macintosh; November 1995; Saturn: JP: November 15, 1996; PlayStation: JP: January 17, 1997
- Genre: Mahjong solitaire
- Modes: Single-player, multiplayer

Shanghai: Great Moments is a Mahjong solitaire video game developed by Quicksilver Software and published by Activision initially for Windows. It is part of the Shanghai series.

== Gameplay ==
Shanghai: Great Moments is an all-Windows remake of the puzzle game Shanghai.

== Development and release ==
Shanghai: Great Moments was developed by Quicksilver Software as part of publisher Activision's Shanghai series of mahjong solitaire video games. It was produced and primarily designed by Tom Sloper, who inherited the responsibility of the series in 1991 during a tumultuous financial period for the latter company. Development began in 1993 with Activision wishing to update its classic properties in the wake of new compact disc technology. This brought with it a significant increase in available memory for using digital assets like redbook audio, photographs, and full-motion video. Sloper said that his marketing department required the inclusion of hefty amounts of such multimedia while management simultaneously required the use of Hollywood vendors for audio, graphics, post-production, and talent. This led to a "crunch period" that extended through the holiday season, causing Sloper to once describe it his most difficult project. Activision's Return to Zork would utilize live actors filmed against blue screens for video clips and the same technique was requested for Shanghai. For Great Moments, actress Rosalind Chao appears as a live-action emcee in video clips throughout play. Sloper hired one of the writers from the sitcom Friends to write Chao's lines.

There was disagreement among the staff regarding the artistic design of the tiles to be used and whether online multiplayer should be featured. When internal committee meetings failed, staff consulted with fans using questionnaires posted on America Online. The tiles were decided upon and although all the fans responded positively to multiplayer, the company rejected the idea due to the general lack of internet access at the time. When devising the modes, Sloper was able to playtest "Beijing" and "Great Wall" with real mahjong tiles but not "Action Shanghai". Once a playable version was delivered, he feared that this last mode was not fun until a tester told him it was his favorite. Sloper realized the modes had appeal to different kinds of players.

First announced in December 1994, Shanghai: Great Moments was released on CD-ROM for Windows 3.1 in March 1995. The game was among the first to be developed for Windows 95. Activision's United States marketing campaign focused on an adult female demographic. Starting that April, television advertisements for the game aired on Lifetime and Nick at Nite offering either a free demo or a discounted copy of the full game. A Macintosh version followed in November. Activision entered into a distribution agreement with GameBank (a joint venture between Microsoft and SoftBank Group) to release the Windows 95 version in Japan. The region received exclusive ports of the game to Sega Saturn and PlayStation via publisher Sunsoft on November 15, 1996, and January 17, 1997, respectively. A Shanghai Double Pack containing Great Moments and Shanghai II: Dragon's Eye was released in 1997. Each set contained a separate disk for both the Macintosh and PC versions.

== Reception ==
Reception

Review scores
Publication	Score
AllGame	2.5/5
Computer Game Review	85/100
Computer Gaming World	2.5/5
Hyper	79/100
Next Generation	4/5
PC Gamer (US)	81%
The Games Machine (Italy)	90/100
Electronic Entertainment	4/5
PC Games (DE)	74%
PC Player	79/100
Power Play	59%
Score	7/10

Next Generation gave four stars out of five for the PC version of the game, and said that "this game is destined to be a classic".

Shanghai: Great Moments sold more than 500,000 copies.
