= Moo3 =

Moo3 may refer to:

- Master of Orion III, a computer game
- Molybdenum(VI) oxide, a chemical compound
