= Shanghai: Triple-Threat =

1994 video game

- North American 3DO box art
- Developers: Success, Activision
- Publishers: JP: Electronic Arts Victor (3DO, FM Towns, PC-98, X68000); JP: Sunsoft (ARC, SAT, SFC); JP: Sony Computer Entertainment (PS); JP: ASK Kodansha (PC-FX); NA: Activision
- Series: Shanghai
- Platforms: X68000, 3DO, Arcade, FM Towns, PC-98, PC-FX, PlayStation, Saturn, Super Famicom
- Release: December 16, 1994: 3DO; JP: December 16, 1994; NA: December 1994; X68000; JP: 1994; Saturn; JP: February 24, 1995; NA: September 1995; PlayStation; JP: March 24, 1995; Super Famicom; JP: November 17, 1995; Arcade, FM Towns, PC-98; JP: 1995; PC-FX; JP: 1996
- Genre: Mahjong solitaire
- Modes: Single-player, multiplayer

Shanghai: Triple-Threat, known in Japan as Shanghai: The Great Wall (Note: 上海 万里の長城, Shanhai: Banri no Chōjō), is a Mahjong solitaire video game developed by Activision and Success as part of the Shanghai series. It was released in Japan for X68000 and 3DO in 1994; FM Towns, PC-98, arcades, PlayStation, Sega Saturn, and Super Famicom in 1995; and PC-FX in 1996. Only the 3DO and Sega Saturn versions were released outside Japan.

== Gameplay ==
Shanghai: The Great Wall is a computer version of Mahjong solitaire involving tile matching.

== Development and release ==
Shanghai: Triple-Threat was co-developed by American company Activision and Japanese company Success as part of the Shanghai series. A multiplatform project, Success was involved in all nine versions of Triple-Threat. The game was first released on the 3DO Interactive Multiplayer in North America and Japan in December 1994. A Sega Saturn version was also released in both regions in 1995: February for Japan and September for North America. Between 1994 and 1996, Japan exclusively saw conversions to X68000, FM Towns, PC-98, PC-FX, PlayStation, Super Famicom, and arcade. Activision published the North American releases. All distribution in Japan was handled by either Sunsoft or Electronic Arts Victor except for the PlayStation and PC-FX versions which were done by Sony Computer Entertainment (SCE) and ASK Kodansha respectively. According to Activision producer Tom Sloper, Activision submitted a request for the PlayStation edition to be released in North America but SCE rejected it. Sloper insisted that, at the time, casual games like Shanghai were often reserved for personal computers and Sony did not want such titles on their new console.

== Reception ==
Reception

Review scores
Publication	Score
AllGame	3.5/5 (3DO)
Famitsu	24/40 (SAT)
GamePro	3.625/5 (SAT)
Next Generation	3/5 (3DO)
3DO Magazine	3/5 (3DO)
Electronic Games	B (3DO)
Game Power	75/100 (3DO)
Oh!X	6/10 (X68000)
Saturn Fan	3.175/5 (SAT)
Sega Saturn Magazine (JP)	20/30 (SAT)
Ultimate Gamer	5/10 (SAT)
Video Games	84% (3DO)

In Japan, Game Machine listed Shanghai: Triple-Threat on their September 15, 1995 issue as being the eleventh most-successful arcade game of the month. Next Generation gave the 3DO version three stars out of five, and called it "very solitary, but incredibly absorbing".
