= Shanghai (video game) =

1986 video game

- Developers: Activision; HAL Laboratory (Game Boy); Sunsoft (arcade); Sega (Master System)
- Publishers: Activision; Sunsoft (arcade)
- Programmer: Brodie Lockard
- Composer: Tomotsune Maeno (PCE)
- Series: Shanghai
- Platforms: Amiga, Amstrad CPC, Apple II, Apple IIGS, Arcade, Atari 8-bit, Atari ST, Commodore 64, MS-DOS, FM Towns, Game Boy, Mac, MSX, NEC PC-8801, NEC PC-9801, NES, Master System, PC Engine, Sharp X1, X68000, TRS-80 Color Computer, TurboGrafx-16, Lynx
- Release: July 1986
- Genre: Mahjong solitaire
- Modes: Single-player, multiplayer

Shanghai is a 1986 mahjong solitaire video game developed and published by Activision. It has been released for the Amiga, Atari ST, Atari 8-bit computers, Commodore 64, MS-DOS, classic Mac OS, Apple IIGS, and Master System. Shanghai was originally programmed by Brodie Lockard. It was released as an arcade video game by Sunsoft in 1988, with Sunsoft releasing sequels under license from Activision.

== Gameplay ==
The game uses a full set of 144 mahjong tiles, divided as follows:

- Dots (1 through 9)
- Bamboos (1 through 9)
- Characters (1 through 9)
- Winds (north, east, south, west)
- Dragons (red, green, white)
- Seasons (spring, summer, autumn, winter)
- Flowers (bamboo, plum, orchid, chrysanthemum)

There are four of every tile except for the seasons and flowers, which have only one tile each.

The objective of the game is to remove all the tiles from the board by matching pairs, but only tiles with at least one free vertical edge may be matched on a turn. Any two seasons can form a pair, as can any two flowers. The game ends if no legal moves can be made.

After winning a game, a portion of the screen collapses to reveal a dragon blinking an eye. The Macintosh and Master System versions show an animated dragon spitting fire.

== Reception ==
Reception

Review scores
Publication	Score				
Publication	Amiga	Atari Lynx	Atari ST	C64	Master System
AllGame		3/5			3/5
Aktueller Software Markt	36/60		36/60		
Computer and Video Games		84%			81%
Dragon	5/5	5/5			
IGN		10/10			
Commodore User				7/10	
Mean Machines					48%

Shanghai sold more than 500,000 copies by 1991. In Japan, Game Machine listed Sunsoft's version of Shanghai on their May 1, 1988, issue as being the fourth most-successful table arcade unit of the month; it ended the year as Japan's ninth highest-grossing arcade conversion kit of 1988.

In 1996, Computer Gaming World declared Shanghai the 146th-best computer game ever released.

=== Critical reviews ===
Computer Gaming World in December 1986 published varying opinions. Gregg Williams stated, "I couldn't believe [Activision] had wasted their resources on putting it out", while Charles Ardai called it "probably the best game of the year". Roy Wagner reviewed the game for Computer Gaming World, and stated that "on the C64, the patterns and stacks are hard to discern (soon your eyes match the screen). On the Amiga the display is outstanding with the pieces actually looking very much like colorful, ivory tiles". Info gave the Amiga version four-plus stars out of five, stating "this program ought to be illegal. It is impossible to play 'just one game'". Describing gameplay as "swift and deceptively simple", the magazine warned "plan on spending a LOT of time with this one". It gave the Commodore 64 version three-plus stars out of five, describing Shanghai as "fanatically addictive". While criticizing the user interface and graphics, the magazine concluded that the players will find it hard to quit. Compute! reviewed the game favorably, reporting that "our Shanghai mania is of such proportions that I am beginning to fear for our health". In 1988, Dragon gave the game 5 out of 5 stars.

=== Atari Lynx ===
Dragon magazine gave the Atari Lynx version 5 stars in their May 1992 issue. Robert Jung of IGN gave the game a score of 10 out of 10 in his review. Computer and Video Games magazine reviewed the game in their March 1991 issue giving an 84% score.

== Legacy ==
A sequel, Shanghai II, was released by Sun Electronics (Sunsoft) for Japanese arcades in March 1989. It was Japan's twelfth highest-grossing arcade conversion kit of 1992. The game was ported to various platforms, for example, PC Engine CD and Game Gear.

Shanghai II: Dragon's Eye was published in 1990 for MS-DOS. Ports were released for Macintosh, Apple IIGS, FM Towns, MSX, PC-98, Sharp X68000, Windows, Sega Genesis, and Super NES. The Genesis version was re-released on the Wii Virtual Console in the PAL regions on November 27, 2009, and in North America on January 11, 2010, which was later delisted at the end of 2013.

Other sequels include:

- Shanghai III
- Shanghai: Triple-Threat
- Shanghai: Great Moments
- Shanghai: True Valor
