= VIPER: Coils of the Serpent =

Role-playing game supplement

VIPER
Coils of the Serpent
- VIPER:Coils of the Serpent Cover
- Designers: Scott Bennie and Steven S. Long
- Illustrators: Eric Lofgren (cover), various (interior)
- Publishers: Hero Games
- Publication: 2002 (5th ed.)
- Genres: Superhero fiction
- Systems: Hero System

VIPER: Coils of the Serpent is a role-playing supplement published by Hero Games for their Champions game, a genre of the Hero System. The book supports the Champions Universe super hero campaign setting.

== Description ==
VIPER is a terrorist network composed of cells called "nests." The group provides players with a world-spanning challenge which nevertheless is often local in its specific threat. VIPER consists mainly of lower-powered agents who have access to high-tech gear supplied by the shadowy VIPER organization. The agents are often supported by super villains and ultimately led by a Nest Leader. The tone of the organization is designed to be adjustable by the game master. Depending on the needs of the campaign, they can either be campy mooks in costumes, or a ruthless conspiracy capable of crushing the characters like bugs. As written, VIPER tends more towards the Bronze Age style.

VIPER is one of the oldest properties still published by Hero Games. VIPER appeared in Champions at least as early as 1984.

== Reviews ==
- Pyramid
- Black Gate #7
