= Shanghai III =

1993 video game

- Arcade flyer
- Developers: Success; Kuusoukagaku
- Publisher: Sunsoft
- Platforms: Arcade, Super Famicom
- Release: 1993; Super Famicom: JP: 1994
- Genre: Mahjong solitaire
- Modes: Single-player, multiplayer

Shanghai III (Note: Japanese: 上海Ⅲ, Hepburn: Shanhai III) is a 1993 mahjong solitaire video game developed by Success and Kuusoukagaku and published by Sunsoft for arcades. A port to the Super Famicom, which uses the Super NES Mouse, was released only in Japan in 1994. It is the third installment in Sunsoft's series of Shanghai games, released under license from Activision and separate from Activision's own mainline series.

Hamster Corporation released the game as part of their Arcade Archives series for the PlayStation 4 in 2015 and Nintendo Switch in 2020, marking its first international release.

== Gameplay ==
Like its predecessors, the objective of the game is to remove all the tiles from the board by matching pairs, but only tiles with at least one free vertical edge may be matched on a turn. Any two seasons can form a pair, as can any two flowers. The game runs on a short time limit, which can be extended by additional credits. The game ends if no legal moves can be made, but clearing all tiles results in victory. Two people can play against each other or in hotseat multiplayer.

== Reception ==
In Japan, it was the fifth highest-grossing arcade game in 1994, and sixth in 1995.
