= Star Trek: Klingon Academy =

2000 video game

- Developer: 14 Degrees East
- Publisher: Interplay Entertainment
- Producer: Raphael Hernandez
- Designers: Ron Hodge; Brent Kollmansberger; Steve McLaffery
- Writer: D.C. Fontana
- Composer: Inon Zur
- Platform: Windows
- Release: NA: June 22, 2000; UK: July 7, 2000
- Genre: Space flight simulator
- Modes: Single-player, multiplayer

Star Trek: Klingon Academy is a space flight simulator video game developed by 14 Degrees East, an internal development house of publisher Interplay Entertainment. The game follows a young Klingon warrior named Torlek as he attends the Elite Command Academy, a war college created by General Chang to prepare warriors for a future conflict with the United Federation of Planets. Christopher Plummer and David Warner reprised their respective roles as Chang and Gorkon for the production of Klingon Academy.

Klingon Academy is the successor to Interplay's Star Trek: Starfleet Academy, this time played from the viewpoint of the Klingon Empire. The change is similar in style to the PC game Star Wars: X-Wing and its sequel, Star Wars: TIE Fighter.

== Story ==
=== Setting ===
Klingon Academy takes place in 2291 (Klingon year 1666 IR, Imperial Reckoning), after the events of Star Trek V: The Final Frontier and prior to those of Star Trek VI: The Undiscovered Country. The Klingon Empire is led by Chancellor Lorak, a noble but ailing ruler, and maintains a peace with the Federation much like the Cold War-type situation presented in Star Trek VI. The Empire's energy production needs are met largely by dilithium and other important resources in the Tal'Ihnor Gates system, near Romulan space. Praxis, the sole moon of the Klingon homeworld Qo'noS, is only a secondary energy production facility at this time. The Klingons have a limited non-aggression and technology exchange treaty with the Romulan Star Empire, although neither side has high regard for the other. There are no significant tensions with the Gorn Star Kingdom, the Tholian Assembly or the Sha'kurian Duchies (a new race created specifically for this game) at this time.

Just prior to the events of the game, General Chang defeats a would-be usurper named Kalnor, head of the powerful House of G'Iogh, and halts his attempted coup d'état against the Klingon government, at the cost of his eye. He then convenes the eighteenth term of the Elite Command Academy as dean and head instructor; additional field instructors are Colonel Poktarl, Brigadier K'mak and Commander Thok Mak (younger brother to Colonel Worf, voiced by Michael Dorn), all prior graduates and seasoned warriors. An Academy lesson consists of a lecture by Chang followed by a simulated starship mission, in which cadets play a vital role during an important stage of a fictitious future war between the Federation and the Klingon Empire. Only five percent of cadets graduate from the prestigious but unforgiving institution.

=== Plot ===
==== The Academy ====
Cadet Torlek, son of Ro'vagh, reflects upon his invitation to the Elite Command Academy and his desire to honor his family name through his success, as his first classes begin. General Chang begins each session with a personal address to his students, lecturing the Klingon virtues of honor, loyalty and duty, and how a warrior is supposed to live up to these virtues, before continuing onto the day's strategy lesson and mission briefing, the term consisting entirely of a hypothetical war with the Federation.

Starting with a blitzkrieg across the Neutral Zone, the war shifts deeper into Federation space, leaving behind many failed Academy cadets. Torlek exhibits exceptional leadership skills and tactical acumen during these trials, all within the overall strategy of exploiting the weaknesses inherent in the Federation's greatest strength - diplomacy - which renders the enemy "a brittle unity" in Chang's eye. He also proves his loyalty and reliability to Chang during two real-world espionage missions against the House of G'Iogh, now led by Kalnor's half-brother Melkor. During one simulation, a Klingon version of Starfleet Academy's Kobayashi Maru scenario tests Torlek's resolve in the face of a situation where either duty or honor can prevail, but not both. The war culminates on Earth's doorstep, as the Federation's response to the diversionary blitzkrieg and to its diplomatic weakness leads to conflict within the Sol system itself - and the unleashing of one of humanity's "greatest scientific achievements", (Project Genesis), on Earth itself. During this final simulation, Torlek destroys the Starship Enterprise under James T. Kirk's command, an incredible accomplishment even in a training scenario. Torlek graduates from the Elite Command Academy with top honors but is not assigned a command as his fellow cadets have been.

Just as the Academy term ends, Chancellor Lorak dies. Gorkon, at this time Lorak's Chief of Staff and the legitimate successor to the position of Chancellor, is blocked from ascension by Melkor, who gathers a large fleet and plunges the Empire into civil war. Gorkon's pacifist leanings towards the Federation are well-known, and General Chang, believing a war with the Federation to be inevitable, refuses to back him despite their past friendship. Chang recruits allies of his own to become a small but formidable third faction in the civil war, including Thok Mak (as his Theater Operations Controller). Torlek, in full agreement with Chang, is recruited to serve as one of his commanders.

==== Klingon Civil War ====
Torlek performs his duties in the field as exceptionally as he did in his training missions, becoming a vital part of Chang's war effort against Melkor. Melkor's treachery becomes explicit as his undercover agents sabotage a starbase just captured by Chang deep in his territory and kill thousands just to prevent a direct assault on the heart of the House of G'Iogh, as well as a traitorous offering of the Tal'Ihnor Gates to the Romulans in exchange for their military support in the war.

As Chang's forces intercept Melkor and the Romulans in the Tal'Ihnor system, Brigadier K'mak, one of Torlek's former instructors from the academy, reveals his unfortunate alignment with the Usurper - his brother, leader of his house, pledged support to Melkor, and K'mak was duty-bound to do the same. Having been tasked with destroying the entire system with a fabricated supernova rather than let it fall into Chang's hands, he still warns Torlek, allowing him to warn Chang and retreat the system on time. The Tal'Ihnor system and most of the enemy warships present are obliterated.

The destruction of the Tal'Ihnor Gates by Melkor makes his victory by conventional means all but impossible, making him turn himself completely to Romulan support, setting a trap for Chang in the newly formed Tal'Ihnor Nebula in the guise of a blood duel to avenge his brother's death. Although aware of the possible deception, Chang accepts the duel, reasoning that even if it is a trap he will still die an honorable death. However, as he falls to the trap, Chang finds Melkor's Romulan support larger than conceived, and thus implores Torlek to gather whatever forces he can, stop the Romulans and kill Melkor by any means necessary. Because Chang's fleet was spread thin trying to hunt Melkor down, Torlek turns to Gorkon for assistance, allowing them to stop the Romulans, but failing to track down and kill Melkor whom escapes again. Due to Gorkon's assistance, Chang is now indebted to him and cannot fight his peaceful policies, assuring Gorkon's ascension to the Chancellorship. Furious for this, Chang demotes Torlek and sends him on routine patrol duties along the Federation Neutral Zone.

During his first patrol, Torlek discovers a ruse by forces still loyal to Melkor, whom create the appearance of a Federation invasion to draw Chang and the bulk of the Klingon fleet away from Qo'noS, while a massive Romulan invasion force advances towards the Klingon homeworld. Chang's deep-seated hatred of the Federation leads him to fall for the trick, but Torlek, ordered by Gorkon, convinces him to place the needs of the Klingon people first. They warp back to Qo'noS together, defeat the Romulans a second time and, with the nearby presence of a then-captain K'mpec, finally kill Melkor.

The final cutscene shows the Klingon Empire stabilized under Chancellor Gorkon but desperate for energy production. Following the Tal'Ihnor Gates debacle, the Klingon moon Praxis is far more exploited than before for more energy. Chang's last meeting with Torlek forebodes the dark turn of events in Star Trek VI. He assigns his "conscience" - Torlek - to a long-term mission searching for new sources of energy, so that he may be free to enact a treacherous conspiracy of his own: to assassinate key interstellar figures and ultimately plunge the Federation and Klingon Empire into full-scale war. Torlek holds his mentor in high regard even after these tragic events come to pass.

== Gameplay ==
Klingon Academy is a 3D space flight simulator, allowing players to command Klingon starships in the single-player campaign. Starships and facilities of all featured Star Trek races are available for quick battles and multiplayer matches. Even the lightest escort classes are much tougher and slower to maneuver than the fighters and bombers commonly featured in space simulator games. Larger starships are even slower, stronger and less agile, emphasizing their massive frames and impressive firepower. Ships are controlled through keyboard shortcut commands, with the mouse as an option for directional control. A joystick may also be configured.

The ultimate objectives of most missions are to warp to a target system, destroy or capture enemy starships or installations, and return to a home base. Elements of stealth, espionage and survival or guile against overwhelming forces are sometimes featured. As one plays through the game, progressively larger and more powerful starships are awarded to the player, with enemy forces to match. Many missions offer the player escort ships of equal or lesser class to their own, which must be managed through the HUD interface.

Gameplay is entirely tactical in nature, as one's list of mission-related star systems are given at the start of each mission, or changed during the mission. All starships have shields and a variety of combat systems, including weapons, tractor beams and ECM. Shields are divided into six faces, one for each fore, aft, port, starboard, dorsal and ventral side of the ship, and must be battered down before significant damage can be inflicted to the ship's hull or subsystems.

Once a shield currently facing the player's starship is dropped, a boarding attempt may be made. Marines are beamed to the opposing ship, and can either attempt to destroy various internal systems or attempt to capture the ship. A captured ship in single-player is immediately converted to friendly status and becomes an escort, while multiplayer ships are immediately destroyed and double points are awarded to the player.

=== Interface ===
The HUD displays the player ship's current status, including a percentage-based damage report on all shields, subsystems and hull strength. A radar-like sensor display gives the position of ships and celestial objects in range, while the ship or object currently targeted appears in a tactical damage display and a 3D picture-in-picture window.

HUD screen, which serves as main game screen.

One of two key features in the Klingon Academy interface is the VOS or Verbal Orders System. A list of substations along the bottom of the HUD correspond to number keys on the numpad. Pressing each number brings up a submenu for the corresponding subsystem, with possible additional submenus available for many commands. For example, pressing the numbers 1, 4, 1, 1 might bring the ship to full power and run weapons and shields at eighty percent, with a corresponding verbal acknowledgement from the crew.

The other key interface feature is the Gunnery Chair. Simulating the periscope-like manual control system seen on Klingon Birds of Prey throughout the Star Trek feature films, this system changes the interface to allow direct control of weapons throughout all of the vessel's firing arcs. Flight control can be delegated to an AI helmsman or retained by the player, and the Gunnery Chair may stay locked onto a single enemy vessel or remain free to move through any firing arc.

=== Ship systems, operation, and weapons ===
There is an array of different weapons from the Star Trek series in the game.

Players also have an array of systems and resources, including some such as marines which are concepts more familiar from the game Star Fleet Battles. Players can use tractor beams, and reroute power to various systems.

As with most Star Trek games, each ship has shields divided into various areas of the ship. The player's HUD screen displays relative strength of each shield on other ships, enabling targeting of weaker shields.

=== Interactive terrain ===
Space is filled with various features, landmarks and terrain. This includes specific planets as well as other features such as nebulas. All of these affect gameplay.

Klingon Academy is an open world video game. It is possible to warp to various points in the galaxy, such as planets, including Earth, and to view various landmarks there.

== Significance ==
While being the same fundamental game type as its predecessor, Klingon Academy enhanced the formula in various ways to create a more complex simulation. Ship control, in particular, was dramatically altered with additions such as the "gunnery chair", multiple viewing angles, and a complex-yet-intuitive function key-based command system. Ship movement was generally slowed down to create a more tactical game by bringing forth the ponderous nature of Star Trek naval combat. This addressed one of the largest criticisms of Starfleet Academy; its fast-moving starships that were compared to a fast-paced fighter simulator.

Klingon Academy is, surprisingly, the only PC game ever produced for Star Trek which provides a starship simulator incorporating a first-person view, a continuous-play structure, a fully navigable in-game universe, and also direct control over multiple ship systems, as opposed to Star Trek: Bridge Commander, in which only non-player characters handle the bridge duty stations, or Star Trek: Starfleet Command, in which play is not continuous, and also the player can only view their ship from the exterior, and cannot travel beyond the immediate area.

The innovative ship damage system remains one of the most interactive of its kind. Starfleet Academy didn't model ship damage visually, except when a warp nacelle was blown off. The later Star Trek: Bridge Commander uses a somewhat similar system, but it is not as reactive as the "ginsu" system present in Klingon Academy. Few other space titles model ship damage other than total destruction. Klingon Academy is also one of the first space games to depict and use interactive stellar phenomena, in order to create a more complicated environment than simply empty space. This "space terrain" not only creates unique tactical and strategic opportunities, but is also as hazardous to the player as it is to his enemy.

== Development ==
Klingon Academy was intended to be a sequel to Interplay's Star Trek: Starfleet Academy. Starfleet Academy was released in 1996 after a lengthy and difficult development process. Both games featured 3D space battles where the player controlled their ship by use of a keyboard and mouse or keyboard and joystick, and were set in the Star Trek universe. Starfleet Academy was set during the period of the Star Trek TOS feature films and was a moderate success, although it was criticized for an overly complex interface and poor vessel movement dynamics. Interplay started laying plans for a sequel around 1997, and a development team was assembled under 14 Degrees East, Interplay development house responsible at the time for games under the Star Trek license. To save costs, the sequel was to use the same game engine with which Starfleet Academy was created. The setting of the game was moved to the time just before the events depicted in the motion picture Star Trek VI: The Undiscovered Country, which was released by Paramount Studios in 1991. Therefore, Klingon Academy is a prequel to Star Trek VI. Like Starfleet Academy, Klingon Academy features space battles interspersed with full-motion video, with real actors and sets and frequent branching dialogue response options.

As soon as Klingon Academy was officially announced, developers ran into problems with the old source code from Starfleet Academy. Parts of the code were lost, garbled or incoherent, and delays began to mount. One of the biggest limitations of using the old code was a built-in constraint that restricted the game's on-screen resolution to 640 x 480 pixels, even though some similar games were capable at the time of being run at higher resolutions. This problem was not solved until just before release in June 2000.

The goals of the developers were quite ambitious: 1) They wanted to add detailed damage modeling to the ships, dubbed "ginsuing" after the infamous late-night Ginsu knives commercials on American television; 2) they had to create and flesh out a large number of new ships with high polygon counts and superior graphics; 3) implement control and ship movement changes to make the game a more authentic Star Trek space combat experience.

Originally slated to be released in the spring of 1999, development delays (not uncommon with many games) pushed the ultimate release date back until the summer of 2000. At several points during the game's halting progress it was nearly cancelled by Interplay, like a previous game entitled Star Trek: Secret of Vulcan Fury, which had been cancelled some years prior. The game entered beta testing by the spring of 2000 and was hastily rushed to completion by Interplay in June 2000.

== Release and reception ==
Reception

Aggregate score
Aggregator	Score
Metacritic	74/100

Review scores
Publication	Score
CNET Gamecenter	7/10
Computer Games Strategy Plus	3/5
Computer Gaming World	4/5
GamePro	3.5/5
GameSpot	6.7/10
GameSpy	86%
GameZone	7/10
IGN	7.8/10
PC Gamer (US)	42%
PC Zone	69%

Klingon Academy was shipped on six CD-ROM discs. Once the game went gold in June 2000, Interplay terminated the entire development team, which did not bode well for the future prospects of the game. Game expansions and a promised mission builder were never released. Two minor technical patches were later released by a skeleton crew of staff kept on the project, but Interplay had effectively ended their support.

The game received "average" reviews according to the review aggregation website Metacritic.

The game's graphics were considered to be adequate for its time, as the destruction of enemy vessels indicated a strong attention to detail. A player could blast holes through enemy vessels, blow off warp nacelles and cause other damage that would produce colorful particles "leaking" into space. Many players and reviewers characterized playing the game as like being in a Star Trek movie, praise that was a vast improvement over Starfleet Academy's criticisms. Vessels were intricately detailed and featured a wide variety of weapons, designs and appearances. Klingon Academy's soundtrack, composed by Inon Zur, was considered well-done and dramatic, creating a uniquely operatic Klingon atmosphere during combat. Complaints were voiced about model and texture complexity, however.

Upon release, the game was rather buggy and unstable. Interplay did develop patches to improve or repair these issues, but bugs still remain. The most problematic of these issues is with regards to mission scripting. If an event doesn't properly trigger, either due to a poorly designed mission or the player's inability to determine how to play through events, it can become impossible to finish or even fail the mission. This can create unnecessary frustration because the player may need to play the same mission many times in order to figure out just how to proceed.

Other complaints against the game by game reviewers included the interface being too complex and inaccessible, and that these features were perhaps not adequately documented by the game manual. Klingon Academy fans, however, may see these features instead as strengths. The artificial intelligence of the ships was also a cause for complaints. Enemies frequently come at the player on a collision course, which can destroy both ships. This issue was fixed in a patch.

GameSpy praised the game, stating, "With top talent like Christopher Plummer and David Warner reprising their roles from The Undiscovered Country and a story that could have easily been made into feature film, Interplay's Star Trek: Klingon Academy is as much an entertainment experience as it is a computer game," and praised the game's cinematic visual effects and the measured pace of combat. GameSpot's review summarized the game as "an extremely ambitious simulation that provides plenty of original gameplay but fails to adequately refine its presentation," citing overly complex controls and poor AI pathfinding as major obstacles. IGN rated it as good game, praising it for its Star Trek theme and presentation of space combat.

Overall, the development of Klingon Academy did rival that of most motion pictures, the marketing and advertisement did not have an equally robust budget or commitment behind it. Although Interplay was receptive to fan sites desiring previews of the Star Trek games, the exposure was apparently inadequate for a game needing to overcome the stigma attached to the franchise after prior disappointments in movies, TV series, and the game's own predecessor.

The game was nominated for the Sci-fi Sim award at Computer Gaming World's 2001 Premier Awards, which went to MechWarrior 4: Vengeance; it did, however, win the "Best Resurrection" Special Achievement award amongst Star Trek games.

Tom's Guide and Space.com have ranked Klingon Academy as one of the top ten Star Trek games.
