= Shanghai II: Dragon's Eye =

1990 video game

- Genesis box art
- Developer: Activision
- Publisher: Activision (Note: Japanese releases published by Hot-B.)
- Platform: MS-DOS: Classic Mac OS, PC-98, arcade, MSX, FM Towns, Apple IIGS, X68000, Windows, Genesis, Super NES
- Release: 1990: MS-DOS; NA/EU: 1990 Apple IIGS; NA: 1990 Arcade, MSX; JP: 1991 Mac; NA: 1991 PC-98; JP: June 28, 1991 FM Towns; JP: November 1991 X68000; JP: February 29, 1992 Super NES; JP: April 28, 1992; NA: February 1993; EU: 1993 Genesis; NA: March 1994
- Genre: Puzzle
- Modes: Single-player, multiplayer

Shanghai II: Dragon's Eye is a 1990 puzzle video game developed and published by Activision. It is a sequel to Shanghai (1986).

== Gameplay ==
Shanghai II: Dragon's Eye has game mechanics based upon Mahjong solitaire. Shanghai II: Dragon's Eye consists of two main gameplay modes. There is the traditional solitaire mode in which the player attempts to remove all tiles in one of twelve prearranged layouts based on the Chinese zodiac. There is also the traditional Shanghai layout. The other mode is called Dragon's Eye. It is a duel that has two players (Master and Slayer) taking turns. The Master attempts to construct a pile of tiles to be shaped like a dragon. The Slayer, on the other hand, attempts to remove matching tiles to prevent the dragon from fully forming.

== Reception ==
Alan Emrich reviewed the game for Computer Gaming World, and wrote that "the gamers are fortunate that the work is done and now they can relax enjoy playing Shanghai II either solitaire or with a friend. Even with some flaws in execution, the concepts in scope and grandeur that sired Shanghai II are those worthy of the highest praise. Well done, Activision. Well done".

Amaya Lopez for Zero rated the game at 83 and said that "Shanghai II offers nothing rivetingly new", but thought that the fans of puzzle games will try this title.
