= Gorn =

Fictional reptilian species in Star Trek

- Star Trek race
- The Gorn whom Captain Kirk fought in "Arena"
- Created by: Fredric Brown; Gene L. Coon

In-universe information
- Other name: Gorn Hegemony (Government)
- Affiliation: Gorn Hegemony

The Gorn are a fictional extraterrestrial humanoid reptilian species in the American science-fiction franchise Star Trek. They first appeared in a 1967 episode of the original series, "Arena", in which Captain Kirk fights an unnamed Gorn on a rocky planet. The fight scene has become one of the best-remembered scenes of the original series, in part due to the slow and lumbering movement of the Gorn, which some viewers have considered unintentionally comical.

The Gorn have since appeared, or been mentioned, in various Star Trek books, video games, and other media properties, including the 1973 episode "The Time Trap" of Star Trek: The Animated Series. They finally appeared again in live-action form in a 2005 episode of Star Trek: Enterprise, "In a Mirror Darkly, Part 2", this time with a more angular appearance and rendered using computer animation. Several Gorn spaceships (though no actual Gorn) appeared in "Memento Mori", a 2022 episode of Star Trek: Strange New Worlds. In "All Those Who Wander", a subsequent 2022 episode of Strange New Worlds, Gorn hatchlings are shown as small, fast-moving, and instantly lethal predators, in contrast to the slow and humanoid adult Gorn previously seen.

== Fictional history ==
According to the Starfleet Technical Manual, the Gorn are from Tau Lacertae IX.

The Gorn had contact with the Orion Syndicate as early as 2154. The name of their government was established as the Gorn Hegemony in the Star Trek: Enterprise episode "Bound".

In the episode "Arena" of the original Star Trek TV series, the Enterprise pursues an alien ship of previously unknown design after it had attacked an Earth colony. A powerful race known as the Metrons force the captains of both ships to fight to settle the dispute. During the episode, the alien race is found to call themselves Gorn. This formal first contact with the Federation occurred at Cestus III in 2267.

A Gorn appeared in the Star Trek: The Animated Series episode "The Time Trap".

Although the Gorn made territorial claims in the Cestus system in 2267, the Federation had a settlement there by 2371, indicating tension later softened enough for it to become a trading site between them or the Gorn had ceded the territory or had joined the Federation.

In 2005, an episode of Star Trek: Enterprise featured a Gorn (albeit in the Mirror Universe) in the episode "In a Mirror, Darkly Part II". In that episode, the Gorn (whose name was Slar) was an overseer of a group of slaves belonging to the Mirror Universe's Tholians in an attempt to steal technology from the Constitution-class NCC-1764 Defiant, which had been transferred into the Mirror Universe from ours. Slar hid in the ship's corridors and killed several crewmembers until it was killed by Jonathan Archer.

A Gorn was slated to appear in the movie Star Trek: Nemesis as a friend of Worf's at Riker's bachelor party, according to an interview given by John Logan to Star Trek Communicator in 2003, but the scene was not in the final version of the film.

The series Star Trek: Strange New Worlds features a character, La'an Noonien-Singh (played by Christina Chong), who is the sole survivor of a Gorn attack, an informal first contact before the formal one shown in "Arena". In the 2022 episode "Memento Mori" of season one, the Gorn attack the starship Enterprise, and the trauma previously suffered by La'an is a central theme of the episode. The Gorn do not actually appear onscreen in the episode, although several of their ships do. Captain Christopher Pike escapes the attack by luring the Gorn ships into a brown dwarf and slingshotting the Enterprise around a black hole.

The Gorn reappear in an episode of the same season, "All Those Who Wander", wherein details of their biology are revealed. Gorn eggs are implanted in an Orion refugee, who fights the hatchlings and damages the USS Peregrine, crashing it on an ice planet. The Enterprise crew finds another refugee with a similar infestation in the Peregrine. The eggs are unable to be detected by Starfleet and other electromagnetic medical sensors, explaining medical staff's inability to find the infestation and prevent the refugee's death. The Gorn kill two Starfleet officers upon hatching. Noonien-Singh reveals that the hatchlings then fight each other to the death until the strongest one wins. The Enterprise crew uses this knowledge to defeat the Gorn before escaping aboard the repaired Peregrine, but not before the Gorn implant eggs in one of the bridge crew, the Aenar engineer Hemmer, forcing him to sacrifice himself by walking out into the planet's cold to destroy the eggs.

== Depictions ==
Slar, a Gorn from the Enterprise episode "In a Mirror, Darkly Part II"

The Gorn was designed by artist Wah Chang, and is depicted in Arena as a hissing, slow-moving but lethal beast. The Gorn captain was portrayed by Bill Blackburn and Bobby Clark, and voiced by Ted Cassidy.

In the animated series, the Gorn appeared less harsh than in the original.

In the Star Trek: Enterprise appearance, the Gorn Slar was designed and rendered using computer animation, and looked different from the original appearance; the clearest difference was the lack of compound eyes. Slar also moved much faster than the Gorn Captain Kirk fought. Since "In a Mirror, Darkly" takes place entirely within the Mirror Universe, the contact seen between the Terran Empire and the creature does not contradict the first contact seen in "Arena".

The 2022 Strange New Worlds episode "All Those Who Wander", depicts the Gorn as having prodigious speed and agility, and a physical form similar to their forms in the 2013 video game Star Trek (see below). The episode reveals key details of their biology, including their reproduction by mating, and then laying parasitic eggs in a host body through spraying venom at the body. The eggs hatch in a similar manner to the chest bursters from Alien. Gorn hatchlings can grow quickly; they and their egg forms have evolved the ability to evade Starfleet and other electromagnetic medical sensors. The episode also depicts their bodies, being reptilian, as sensitive to, and thus easily killed by, extreme cold.

The 2023–2025 two part episode "Hegemony" again depicts the Gorn, who this time capture many of the ship's crew members. In the 2025 episode "Terrarium", crew member Ortegas is stranded on a planet with a Gorn, and learns to communicate with it. This episode serves as a prequel to the original series episode "Arena".

== Other appearances ==
=== Books ===
- Gorn appear in the 2005 novel STAR TREK – Starfleet Corps of Engineers #44: Where Time Stands Still, a sequel to the animated episode mentioned above.
- Gorn appear in Star Trek: The Next Generation book #32, Requiem.
- A Gorn, with a name that sounds like "Rrrk", manages a bar in Arcturus (a city, planet and star all with the same name) in the novel The Lost Years.
- The Gorn are featured in the 2010 Pocket Books novel Star Trek: Typhon Pact – Seize the Fire They also appear in the Star Trek: Destiny trilogy and the TNG novel Cold Equations: Silent Weapons. In these novels, the Gorn have joined an interstellar organization known as the Typhon Pact (composed of the Gorn, Romulans, Tholians, Breen, Tzenkethi, and Kinshaya).
- The mirror universe counterparts of the Gorn appeared in Star Trek: Mirror Universe – Rise Like Lions.*
- Kirk mentions his fight with the Gorn in dialogue with the Romulan Commander in the 1977 novel The Price of the Phoenix.

=== Comics ===
- Gorn burial practices were discussed in an issue of Marvel Comics' Star Trek Unlimited.
- A Gorn appeared in the first DC Comics run of Star Trek, in 1984. Bones comments that he doesn't have any tranquilizer strong enough to knock out a Gorn.
- The Gorn homeworld and government chamber are shown in the Star Trek: The Next Generation trade paperback comic book The Gorn Crisis.

=== Video games ===
- A mini-campaign with a Gorn enemy and ally appear in the SNES game and PC game Starfleet Academy. There are video cutscenes featuring a Gorn, portrayed using a puppet. The ships are also playable in skirmish mode, and multiplayer games.
- Gorn appear in the PC game Starfleet Command.
- Gorn ships appear in the PC game Klingon Academy. They are also playable in skirmish mode.
- Gorn appear in the Nintendo game Star Trek: 25th Anniversary.
- Gorn are available as one of the playable races for the Klingon Empire in the PC game Star Trek Online. The 'Gorn' jokes are a running gag in the online chat and spawned a fan-site of the species.
- Dr. McCoy referred to performing an emergency delivery of a brood of eight Gorn, noting "those little bastards bite!" in the 2013 film Star Trek Into Darkness. This was referenced in the 2013 video game Star Trek (occurring before Into Darkness) when McCoy performs a c-section (offscreen) on a Gorn in the game.
- Kirk and Spock fight the Gorn in the 2012 Star Trek Video Game.
- The Gorn appear in the 2013 video game Star Trek, set in the alternate universe of the 2009 Star Trek film. Taking place between the first and second film, the Gorn appear as enemies attacking the New Vulcan colony. The Gorn shown are depicted as being a brutal race of imperialistic extra-galactic conquerors who had already taken over their galaxy before crossing over into the Milky Way. They are shown to have a rigid caste system based on skin coloration and intelligence levels with the more intelligent Gorn serving as soldiers, while primitive ones serve an attack-dog role. These Gorn are far more alien-looking and are not as fully bipedal as previous incarnations. Their relations to the Gorn of the original series are not known.
- In Star Trek: Starfleet Command and Star Trek: Starfleet Command II: Empires at War The Gorn's government was referred to as the Gorn Confederation.
- The Gorn race also appears in the alternate non-canon Star Fleet Universe, represented in the range of board wargames from Amarillo Design Bureau Inc. as well as the first two Star Fleet Command games (and the Orion Pirates stand-alone add on for Starfleet Command II) from Taldren. These are not considered canon with the Star Trek movies or series. In this continuum, the Gorn Confederation is a powerful empire located coreward of the Romulan Star Empire, also bordering the United Federation of Planets and the Interstellar Concordium. It comprises three genetically related races, each from a neighboring star system, known as Ghdar I, Ghdar II and Ghdar III. They are portrayed as a more civilized and cultured race than as referenced in the Paramount Star Trek universe.
  - They ally in Y174 with the Kzinti Hegemony, the Hydran Kingdoms, the Federation and the Tholian Holdfast in the General War. The alliance between the Gorns and the Federation – following a brief conflict over a misunderstanding regarding the Federation colony on Cestus III, a Gorn world – represents one of the few alliances that is based on mutual trust and desire for friendship as opposed to political convenience. They are mutually antagonistic with the Romulans, with whom they share a border with the Interstellar Concordium, and were among the first races to feel the effects of the ISC War of Pacification.
- The Gorn appear in the PC/Android/iOS game Star Trek Fleet Command, in which the player can obtain and perform game actions using a Gorn ship ("Gorn Eviscerator"), which resembles the Gorn ship type portrayed in Star Trek: Strange New Worlds. There is also a system containing Gorn ships for the player to destroy for rewards, and a short Gorn themed mission arc.

=== Board games ===
- Gorn ships appeared in Star Trek: Starship Tactical Combat Simulator by FASA. Lead alloy versions of the MA-12 and the BH-2 were available in the late 1980s.

=== Toys ===
- A life-sized Gorn statue was on exhibit in the History of the Future museum in the Las Vegas Hilton's Star Trek: The Experience attraction. Since the attraction's closing, the figure's current whereabouts are unknown.
- Gorn action figures have been available over the years including the Mego line from the 1970s, appearing in that line's television commercials.

== Popular culture ==
- A Gorn appeared with William Shatner in the preview/ad for the Star Trek 2 game in 2013.

== See also ==
- Trandoshans
- Silurians
