= Crazy Quilt (card game) =

Solitaire card game

- Solitaire game
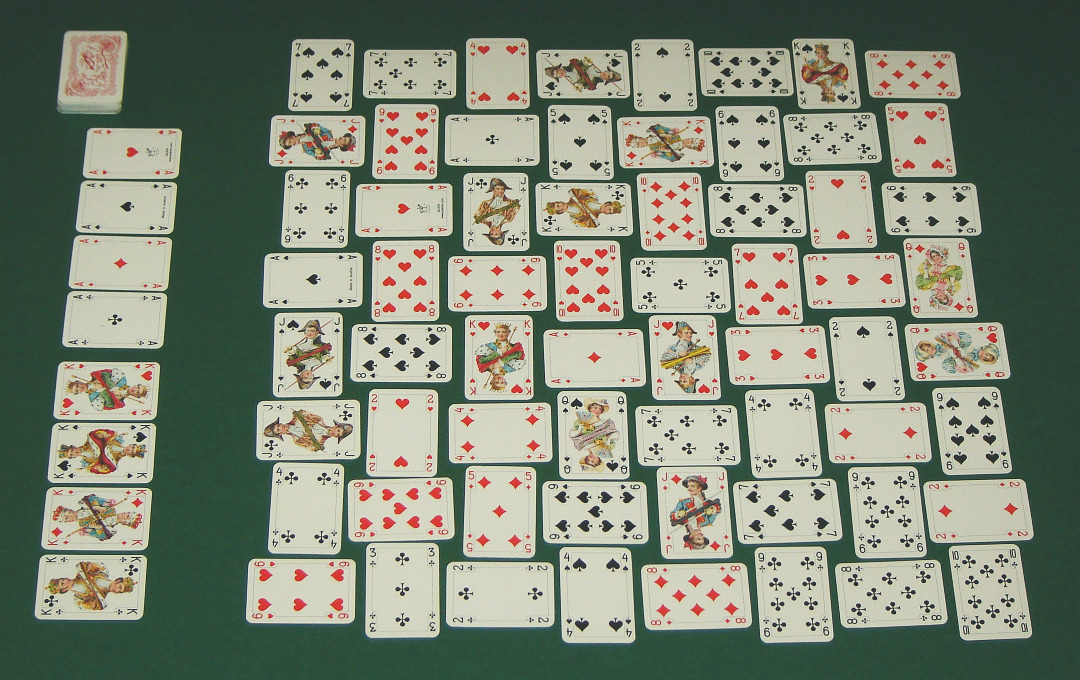
- Initial layout
- Type: Reserved packer
- Deck: Two standard 52-card decks

Crazy Quilt (also known as Quilt, Indian Carpet or Japanese Rug) is a solitaire card game using two decks of 52 playing cards each. The game is so-called because the reserve resembles the weaves of a carpet or an arrangement of a quilt, with cards alternating vertical and horizontal rotations.

== Rules ==
First, one Ace and one King of each suit are taken out to form the foundations. The rest of the cards are shuffled, and 64 cards are dealt into eight rows of eight cards each. Each row should have its card alternately placed vertically and horizontally in this order. The resulting layout resembles a chessboard with vertical and horizontal cards alternating. This reserve is called the "quilt".

The cards on the quilt with their shorter sides exposed, i.e. a card with one of its shorter sides not touching another card, are available for play to the foundations or the top of the wastepile. The foundations that start with the Aces are built up by suit while those that start with the Kings are built down also by suit.

The stock is dealt one at a time onto the wastepile. The top card of the wastepile can be used to build on the foundations and be built up or down by suit using cards from the quilt.

Once the stock runs out, the wastepile (which includes cards acquired from the quilt) is gathered and turned faced down without shuffling to be used as the new stock. This can be done only once in the entire game.

The patience is out when all cards, both from the quilt and the wastepile, end up in the foundations.

== Variants ==
A common variant (sometimes called Indian Carpet) is to allow an extra redeal, in order to make the game easier. In another variant (sometimes called Persian Rug) cards not in the tableau are dealt to reserves instead of a stock pile and waste pile, which allows more play.

== See also ==
- Mahjong solitaire
- List of patiences and solitaires
- Glossary of patience and solitaire terms
