= Alan Emrich =

American writer and video game designer (1959–2025)

- Born: October 1, 1959; Long Beach, California, U.S.
- Died: January 7, 2025 (aged 65); Keene, New Hampshire, U.S.
- Occupations: Writer; video game designer; video game journalist
- Known for: Coining the term "4X"
- Website: Official website

Alan Emrich (October 1, 1959 – January 7, 2025) was an American writer and designer of board games and video games. He contributed to the design of Master of Orion and Master of Orion 3, wrote strategy guides for video games, and acknowledged as the originator of the term 4X to describe the genre of strategic turn-based games associated with games like Master of Orion. Before the rise of video games, Emrich wrote about and designed board games and organized conventions about them. He ran a small game publishing company called Victory Point Games (until he sold the company to a new owner) and lectured in game design and project management. In 2001, Emrich received the Blomgren/Hamilton Memorial Award for Lifetime Achievement from ConsimWorld.com.

== 4X games ==
Emrich coined the term "4X" ("eXplore, eXpand, eXploit, eXterminate") in his 1993 review of Master of Orion in Computer Gaming World, describing strategy games that involve exploration, expansion, and exploitation of territory, and extermination of opponents. The design of Master of Orion includes several suggestions he and Tom Hughes made.

Highlighting it as “Quadruple-X”. Emrich wrote, “Quadruple-X - I give MOO a XXXX rating because it features the essential four X’s of any good strategic conquest game: EXplore, EXpand, Exploit and Exterminate. In other words, players must rise from humble beginnings, finding their way around the map while building up the largest, most efficient empire possible. Naturally, the other players will be trying to do the same, therefore their extermination becomes a paramount concern. A classic situation, indeed, and when the various parts are properly designed, other X’s seem to follow. Words like EXcite, Experiment and Excuses (to one’s significant others) must be added to a gamer’s X-Rating list.”

Until April 2002, Emrich was a lead designer of Master of Orion 3, which attempted to add a 5th X, eXperience, to the genre. Then he left the developer, Quicksilver Software, for reasons neither party explained.

== Strategy guides ==
Emrich wrote or co-wrote the following strategy guides:

- Sid Meier’s Civilization or Rome on 640K a Day (with Johnny L. Wilson)
- Official Strategy Guide for Master of Orion ISBN 1559585072, 9781559585071 (with Tom Hughes)
- Official Strategy Guide for Master of Magic (with Tom Hughes and Petra Schlunk)
- Official Strategy Guide for Empire Deluxe ARK ark:/13960/t6vz2b67t

He criticized later strategy guides for:

- "containing only facts which should have been in the game manual", e.g. about the user interface.
- "failing to teach users how to improve their play".
- "failing to provide information which helps them to makes decisions", e.g. about the capabilities and costs of units and buildings.
- "being inaccurate", often because the developers have "tweaked the game during the publication lead time".

The faults, he said, are mainly caused by "the game publishers' and guide publishers' haste to get their products on to the market".

== Career ==
In 1977, Emrich and John Meyers co-founded the ORCCON game convention in Los Angeles, and later Emrich helped in the start-up of the GATEWAY and GAMEX conventions, also in Los Angeles. Emrich was the first Vice-President of the Game Manufacturers Association. In the 1980s, he founded a game company Diverse Talents Inc., which imported and exported games, ran the Los Angeles game conventions, and published several magazines including Fire & Movement. In this period, he also designed board and card games.

He was a five-time undefeated champion on the game show Whew! in July and August 1979, winning $5840 but never winning the $25,000 bonus round.

During the 1990s, Emrich worked for the Computer Gaming World magazine as its first Strategy Game Editor and later its first Online Editor. In this period, he also wrote or co-wrote strategy guides. Until April 2002, he was a lead designer of Master of Orion 3.

In 2001, Emrich received the Blomgren/Hamilton Memorial Award for Lifetime Achievement from ConsimWorld.com.

He was also a professor at the Art Institute of California at Orange County, where he taught Game Design, Prototyping, and Project Management to students — he regarded this as an "official instance of his lifelong passion for teaching". He also co-founded and owned Victory Point Games, a board and card game publishing company that was launched to produce small, budget-priced games based around submissions from students and professional game designers alike — he said founded the company in order to give his students "experience of the business side of game publishing".

== Personal life and death ==
Emrich was born in Long Beach, California, on October 1, 1959. He died on January 7, 2025, at age 65, in Keene, New Hampshire.
