= Castles II: Siege and Conquest =

1992 video game

- Developer: Quicksilver Software
- Publisher: Interplay Productions
- Designers: Vincent DeNardo; William C. Fisher; Byon Garrabrant
- Programmer: Byon Garrabrant
- Artists: Leonard Boyarsky; Todd J. Camasta; Bob Trupe
- Composer: Charles Deenen
- Platforms: MS-DOS, Amiga, Amiga CD32, FM Towns, NEC PC-9801, Macintosh
- Release: 1992 (DOS); 1993 (CD32, Towns, PC-98); 1994 (DOS CD, Mac)
- Genre: Real-time strategy
- Mode: Single-player

Castles II: Siege and Conquest is a 1992 real-time strategy game developed by Quicksilver Software and published by Interplay Productions for MS-DOS. Castles II is the sequel to the 1991 game Castles. Ports for the Amiga CD32, FM Towns, NEC PC-9801 were released in 1993. The DOS CD-ROM version and Macintosh port were released in 1994. The Macintosh version of the game was published by Interplay's MacPlay brand name. GOG.com released an emulated version for Microsoft Windows in 2008.

== Story ==
The game takes place in a semi-fictionalized version of historical France. The game begins in the year 1312 A.D., shortly before the beginning of the Hundred Years' War. In the game's version of history, France's King Charles dies on the throne in the year 1311. Because Charles left no heirs to take up the crown, it is unclear who will become the new king. The Pope is willing to declare a new King, but only after one of the local nobles has gained significant influence over the land and won favor with the Church.

The player takes the role of one of five different nobles (Albion, Duke of Valois, Anjou, Aragon, or Burgundy), fighting for the title of King of Bretagne. Early on, much of the territory is controlled by local (neutral) lords, and is easily taken up by one of the major players. In addition, three territories are controlled by the Pope, but players may cede additional territories to the Church in order to improve relations.

The player's task will be to take over as much of France as possible, and then try to claim the throne. If other players remain at this time, they will attack the player to damage their claim. Eventually the Pope will decide whether or not to support the claimant, and the game will end. According to the game manual, the average in-game time passed is usually between three and ten years.

== Gameplay ==
Gameplay includes scouting out unknown territories, conquering them, building castles to prevent revolts and line defenses, raising an army, feeding and paying them, and eventually making a claim for the title of King. Depending on how strong the human player or the other four AI-engined nobles are, the Pope will decide whether or not to endorse the claim. Therefore, attacking someone that claims the title can prevent them from getting it. Using diplomacy also allows the player to maintain high relationships with the other nobles and with the Pope, a useful feature to protect from attack. Alternately, the player can conquer everyone and even the Pope to win by default (in which case the anti-Pope will also endorse the player's claim to the throne).

Depending on which noble is picked, the player can start at any of five general areas of the map. Initially he is provided with one territory rich in one of four resources: gold, timber, iron, or food. Having more of one kind of resource territory increases the total amount that the player can harvest per turn (also dependent on the total number of "points" allocated). Players can only gather the resources in territories they control, so a player who does not control at least one of each kind must rely on trades to gain those resources.

At first, the player can perform one task each of three types at once: administrative (gathering resources and building castles, represented by a green bar), military (recruiting an army, building optional weapons like a catapult, and policing the realm, represented in red), and political (sending scouts, diplomats, and spies, represented in blue). The more a type of task is performed, the more points which may be devoted to that kind of task are gained (to a limit of nine per type). At a rating of 5, two tasks can be performed at once.

The most remarkable feature at the time for Castles II was the ability to design and save different castles. Depending on the total number of walls and turrets, the castles were assigned point values that determined how long it takes to build. Larger castles are harder to destroy or capture, which serves to keep enemies out of the controlled lands. Large castles are also used to prevent revolts. Armies include infantry, archers, and knights, each costing a different resource to recruit. The size of the army that can be raised is dependent upon the number of territories and castles the player possess.

== PC CD-ROM version ==
A CD-ROM version of the game features an extensive amount of full motion video about the history and purpose of different castles around Europe, presented by a historian as short informative clips that were separate from the game. The CD version also featured a full orchestral soundtrack by composer Charles Deenen. Also present are video scenes taken from The Private Life of Henry VIII and Alexander Nevsky that play during certain events that occur throughout the game.

== Copy protection ==
Occasionally, a question will be given to the player to "determine if he is the real king". The answer to this question can only be found in the manual, done as a form of copy protection. A wrong answer will result in a game over screen. This was not used in the CD-ROM edition.

== Reception ==
Computer Gaming World in 1993 called Castles II "a first-rate strategy game ... a joy to play", praising the user interface, variety of play options, and strong computer AI. In a 1993 survey of pre 20th-century strategy games the magazine gave the game three-plus stars out of five, calling it "much more of a wargame than the former, and worthy of examination by anyone interested in the period". The game received 4 out of 5 stars in Dragon.

James V. Trunzo reviewed Castles II in White Wolf #46 (Aug., 1994), giving it a final evaluation of "Excellent" and stated that "Unlike many early CD-ROM products, Castles II is neither a straight-port onto a CD-ROM disk nor a glossy version of the old game with little or no enhancements. Castles II on CD-ROM seamlessly knits the various aspects of the medium with the strong elements inherent to the old version of the game, resulting in a truly excellent product."

== See also ==
- Hundred Years' War
