= Star Trek: Starfleet Academy – Starship Bridge Simulator =

1995 video game

- North American SNES box art
- Developers: Interplay; High Voltage Software (32X)
- Publisher: Interplay
- Producer: Alan Pavlish
- Designers: Jeremy Barnes; Scott Everts
- Programmer: Darryl D. Hawkins
- Writer: Scott Bennie
- Composers: Ken Allen (SNES); Brian L. Schmidt (32X)
- Series: Star Trek
- Platforms: Super NES, 32X
- Release: Super NES: NA: January 31, 1995; EU: March 1995; 32X: NA/EU: 1995
- Genre: Simulation
- Modes: Single-player, multiplayer

Star Trek: Starfleet Academy – Starship Bridge Simulator is a video game for the Super Nintendo Entertainment System and 32X systems that was released in 1995 by Interplay, the same group that produced many later Star Trek starship games.

== Reception ==
Reviewing the Super NES version, Bro' Buzz of GamePro described it as "solid but low-key". He criticized the sound effects but praised the easy-to-use control interface, variety of game play, and numerous Star Trek references, and gave the game an overall positive recommendation. Next Generation reviewed the SNES version of the game, rating it two stars out of five, and stated that "It's a game, Jim, but not as we'd like it."

The four reviewers of Electronic Gaming Monthly scored the 32X version a respectable 6.675 out of 10, but thoroughly panned the game, stating that the graphics, sound, and gameplay are all virtually identical to those of the Super Nintendo original. One of the reviewers also remarked that the game is "great for fans, but too complex for regular players." Bro' Buzz likewise said the 32X version is no different from the year-old Super NES version. He also criticized that the gameplay, while sometimes interesting, is marred by intervals of dull inactivity, such as when warping.

== See also ==
- Star Trek: Starfleet Academy, a 1997 video game
