= Champions in 3-D =

Role-playing game supplement

Cover art by David Dorman, 1990

Champions in 3-D is a supplement published by Hero Games and Iron Crown Enterprises (I.C.E.) in 1990 for the superhero role-playing game Champions.

== Contents ==
Champions in 3-D provides a wide range of alternate realities for a Champions campaign. Five dimensions are described in detail:

- "Dreamzone": A reality filled with nightmares
- "Horror World": Sentient parasites have taken over the world
- "Fantasy World": A sword & sorcery fantasy setting
- "Nazi World": The United States has been invaded by the Fourth Reich
- "Backworld": Superheroes now autocratically rule a dystopian world, while supervillains are the freedom fighters.

Short descriptions of a further 26 alternate realities are also included.

== Publication history ==
In 1981, Hero Games published the superhero role-playing game (RPG) Champions that used the "Hero System" set of rules. Hero Games subsequently published a second- and third-edition of Champions, but ran into financial difficulty, and was eventually taken over as a subsidiary of I.C.E. In 1989, Hero Games/I.C.E. published a fourth edition of Champions that included the latest version of the Hero System rules. The supplement Champions of 3-D was published the following year, a 160-page softcover book edited by Rob Bell, with contributions from Aaron Allston, Allen Varney, Scott Bennie, Scott Jamison, and Steve Cook. Interior illustrations were by Patrick Zircher and Scott Heine, and cover art was by David Dorman.

== Reception ==
Sean Holland reviewed the product in the February–March 1991 issue of White Wolf. He stated that "I think Champions in 3D is great, and if you like alternate worlds, I think that you will like it too." He rated it at 4 out of a possible 5 points.

== Reviews ==
- Papyrus Issue 14 (April 1994, p.6)
