= Conquest of the New World =

1996 video game

- Developer: Quicksilver Software
- Publisher: Interplay Productions
- Producer: Vincent DeNardo
- Designers: Vincent DeNardo; William C. Fisher; Byon Garrabrant; Gregory Marsters
- Programmer: Byon Garrabrant
- Artist: Todd J. Camasta
- Composer: Richard Band
- Platforms: MS-DOS, Mac OS
- Release: NA: April 24, 1996; EU: 1996
- Genre: Turn-based strategy
- Modes: Single-player, multiplayer

Conquest of the New World is a video game produced by Interplay Productions and released in 1996. It is a strategy game, involving one or more players either by hotseat, on LAN, modem, or even PBEM (play-by-email). The game starts in the year 1493 and deals with the discovery and conquest of the Americas.

A deluxe version was released in December 1996. A version for Mac OS was released the following year. It was later re-released through GOG.com.

== Gameplay ==
Players move their various units (including explorers, colonists, and soldiers) through a blacked-out world, uncovering mountains, plains, and rivers. Landmarks are named by the first player to discover them. After mapping out some of the local terrain, players must build a colony and make it self-sufficient; to this end, players can build sawmills, metal mines, housing, and farms to generate the resources and space necessary to expand, and eventually, build more colonies. Lastly, players must train armies with which to conquer the other colonists and eventually proclaim independence from their mother country.

The player controls one of 6 different nations (five European and the High Natives) in their attempt to colonize and conquer a "new" continent.

The game is turn-based, and combat is a mini-game taking place on a 3x4 square battlefield where victory can be achieved by killing all enemy troops or capturing the enemy's flag. The gameworld is represented in an isometric point of view with three-dimensional terrain features.

Colonies consist of a Colony Centre, exerting an area of control within which all buildings must be placed. Most buildings, including the Colony Centre, can be upgraded, adding to their production capabilities. Resources are used for construction and trading.

Victory conditions are customizable, so the game can be played as a pure conquest game with the last nation standing, being the winner, or as a more peaceful race for victory points to a pre-determined score.

== Reception ==
Reception

Review scores
Publication	Score
GameSpot	8.5/10
Next Generation	3/5
Computer Game Review	90/100
MacUser	3.5/5

A reviewer for Next Generation judged that while Conquest of the New World is not as enthralling or addictive as its competitors Civilization II or Sid Meier's Colonization, and is too lacking in flair and style to appeal to the casual player, it has a distinctive simplicity and a need for forethought which would make it enjoyable for hardcore strategy fans. He particularly complimented the ability for players to adjust the level of complexity by setting either the colonies or the military on automatic. In contradiction, Trent Ward of GameSpot argued that Conquest of the New World is much less dry than other historical simulations. He commented that the battles are tactically deep while refreshingly short, and that features such as the ability to name landmarks and networked multiplayer make the game generally outstanding. Scott Gehrs of Computer Game Review concluded, "For players that are into strategy games, Conquest of the New World should be one of the games on the shelf." The game scored 3/5 in Computer Games Magazine, and 4/5 in Adrenaline Vault.

In 2000, Conquest of the New World passed 500,000 units in sales, which included the original game, deluxe edition, Mac OS version, and language-specific versions combined.
