= Star Trek: Starfleet Academy (1997 video game) =

1997 video game

- Developer: Interplay Productions
- Publishers: Interplay Productions; MacPlay (Mac)
- Directors: Brian Fargo (game); Martin Denning (live action)
- Producer: Jacob R. Buchert III
- Designer: Floyd Grubb
- Programmer: John Price
- Artists: Michael J. Sherak; Perry Scalf
- Writers: Daniel Greenberg; Scott Bennie; Jacob R. Buchert III
- Composers: Ron Jones; Adam Rote
- Series: Star Trek
- Platforms: Windows, Mac OS
- Release: Windows; NA: September 12, 1997; EU: 1997; Macintosh October 1997
- Genre: Space flight simulator
- Modes: Single-player, multiplayer

Star Trek: Starfleet Academy is a Star Trek PC simulation game developed and published by Interplay in 1997. The game simulates the life of a typical Starfleet cadet, with the player learning the basics of flying a starship and engaging in roleplaying with a crew of cadets, with the eventual goal of becoming captain of their own ship. The game included full motion video featuring William Shatner, Walter Koenig, and George Takei reprising their roles from the original television series and movies, and a multiplayer simulation mode allowing for up to 32 players.

A tie-in novelization by Diane Carey was released by Pocket Books in June 1997. The game received an expansion pack in 1998 titled Chekov's Lost Missions and a sequel was released in 2000 called Star Trek: Klingon Academy. Abridged versions of the base game were also released with the subtitles Cadet Briefing and Strategic Command.

== Gameplay ==
Apart from live-action cutscenes with branching dialogue that decides the course of the cutscene (allowing for the player to even risk summary dishonorable discharge in some circumstances), Starfleet Academy is a 3D space flight simulator, allowing players to command Federation starships of various classes in the single-player campaign, including the iconic Constitution-class - the ship class which includes the USS Enterprise - as well as its successor, the USS Excelsior. Ships are controlled through keyboard shortcut commands, though a joystick may also be configured. The mouse is usually used to interact with the ship's sections when off-action, which include the science station, communications, engineering, and even a database library with most persisting elements of the Star Trek universe.

The objectives of most Starfleet Academy missions are to warp to a target system, destroy or capture enemy starships or installations by disabling them or protect allied targets, and return to a home base. Elements of diplomacy through communications are often featured in these missions. As one plays through the game, progressively stronger enemy forces do appear that require the player to use extensive maneuverability and have total familiarization of the ship's resources, especially damage control and power allocations. While some missions do have allied vessels, the player cannot control them directly, nor enemy vessels can be boarded and taken over, unlike the sequel Star Trek: Klingon Academy.

All starships have shields and a variety of combat systems, including weapons, tractor beams and ECM. Shields are divided into six faces, one for each fore, aft, port, starboard, dorsal and ventral side of the ship, and must be battered down before significant damage can be inflicted to the ship's hull or subsystems.

In addition to simple combat situations, some missions include more complex scenarios such as a re-creation of the near-disastrous starship confrontation with Khan Noonien Singh as well as the Kobayashi Maru scenario, both depicted in Star Trek II: The Wrath of Khan, as well as a recreation of the episode "Balance of Terror", from the original series. Other scenarios have an overarching plot around them, such as a star system whose sun faces an imminent supernova due to the continuous draining by a space faring creature, a governor of the Klingon Empire acting illegally against the Federation with the aid of pirates and Romulans, and a once peaceful alien species turned hostile by a psychic that formed a cult of personality.

The game has a multiplayer starship combat mode that allows up to 32 players to play together.

== Story ==
=== Setting ===
Starfleet Academy is set in the Star Trek universe, up to two years prior to the events of Star Trek VI: The Undiscovered Country. Captain James T. Kirk of the Enterprise arrives with Captain Hikaru Sulu and Pavel Chekov to Earth to attend the United Federation of Planets' Starfleet Academy's latest starting Command College class, on which Sulu is to evaluate for the next two years before he takes command of the Excelsior, as Kirk and Chekov help out in some particular simulator assignments.

Attending these classes is the human protagonist, Cadet David Forrester, to which he is assigned his crew - Vulcan Science Officer Sturek (whom is also Forrester's friend from earlier computer classes), Andorian Communications Officer Vanda M'Gila (who is the daughter of a renowned Andorian Ambassador mentioned in Star Trek: Klingon Academy), Engineer Robin Brady (an introvert, but technically proficient), Helmsman Jana Akton (an overworking Trill from a mining colony in the Levantine Expanse) and Tactical Officer Geoffrey Corin (a happy-go-lucky son of a wealthy Alpha Centauri family) - which Forrester must monitor their performance and frequently settle their recurring conflicts to ensure they can perform well in the simulated missions.

Other characters also include Aex Rotherot, the headmaster of Starfleet Academy, as well as Faith Gage, a fellow Academy student and a potential love interest for Robin, and Frank Malan, a rival Command College Cadet with an increasing hostile opinion towards non-human species, especially Klingons and Romulans.

=== Plot ===
Forrester and his crew start their Academy term and first missions, working well as a team "in spite of their occasional bickering", as noted by Kirk in one point. Forrester, at some expense, does manage to remedy some of the immediate issues affecting the team performance, including having Corin take his study responsibilities more seriously as well as getting Brady to be more socially active.

News suddenly reach the academy that the Federation-Andorian colony of Bicea, a once contested world by the Federation and the Klingons in the Neutral Zone, was attacked and destroyed by an unknown force with no survivors, M'Gila's mother counted amongst the casualties. With initial investigations suggesting Klingon disruptors were utilized in the attack, as well as an unauthorized counter-attack provoked by a Federation vessel gone rogue, tensions increase between the Federation and the Klingon Empire. The evidence of the Bicea attack is sent to the Starfleet Academy for Sturek to analyze, but the science lab is suddenly detonated with the evidence, and Sturek is put under investigation. Willing to save their colleague, Forrester and the crew perform their own investigation into the science lab bombing.

Following the Kobayashi Maru simulation, the command staff approaches Forrester with an idea to create a ruse and force the culprit into the open, on which Forrester plays along. When approached by Faith Gage, who assists Forrester in breaking into the science lab to look for clues, she falls for the ruse and exposes herself as the bomber, on which she is ambushed and incapacitated by Sulu. Faith's arrest clears Sturek of the bombing charges.

It is revealed that Faith had been working with the Vanguard, a human supremacist group within the academy led by Frank Malan, and that Sturek's initial investigation revealed the Bicea attack wasn't done by the Klingons, but rather of a living cybernetic entity named by Sturek the 'Meclanti', and that the evidence would've exonerated the Klingons of any accusation, costing the Vanguard their strongest propaganda weapon. It is also revealed by Brady that M'Gila had been attending the Vanguard's meetings, wanting revenge for the attack on Bicea and only being accepted due to her status as an ambassador's daughter, but M'Gila had seen through their intent. Both Forrester, M'Gila and Kirk work a ruse to infiltrate the Vanguard, which plans a hostile takeover by bombing the offices of the command staff, and Kirk subdues them by using a modified phaser set to a wide-angle stun.

With the threat of the Vanguard neutralized and Malan apprehended, the rest of Forrester and his crew's academy term goes unabated, on which Forrester and Sturek use a newly recovered piece of Meclanti technology to establish and prove their theory: that the Meclanti are incapable of establishing direct verbal communication but may be capable of learning it by mimicking a series of their actions, allowing rudimentary communication to be established. Following Forrester's graduation, he is given a temporary command of the USS Enterprise to track down the Meclanti and attempt his theory, which he may or not succeed depending on the player's actions and choices, the aftermath going as accordingly.

== Cast ==
Being a live action featured game including within the simulated missions, Starfleet Academy features a number of actors.

- Peter Kluge as Cadet David Forrester, a student of Starfleet Academy's Command College, and the player's protagonist character.
- William Shatner as James T. Kirk, captain of the USS Enterprise who assists the Starfleet Academy with some simulator missions and lectures.
- George Takei as Hikaru Sulu, former helmsman of the USS Enterprise and new assistant director to Aex Rotherot in the Starfleet Academy.
- Walter Koenig as Pavel Chekov, navigator and second officer on the USS Enterprise, who assists the Starfleet Academy with some simulator missions.
- Julianna Robinson as Vanda M'Gila, an Andorian student of Starfleet Academy who is assigned to Forrester's crew as the communication's officer. She is also daughter to an Andorian ambassador.
- Allan Louis as Geoffrey Corin, a human student of Starfleet Academy who is assigned to Forrester's crew as the helmsman and tactical officer. He comes from a wealthy family from the Alpha Centauri, and "bought his way in". He is credited within the game as Allan Lewis.
- Patricia Skeriotis as Jana Akton, a Trill student of Starfleet Academy who is assigned to Forrester's crew as helmsman. She comes from a mining colony in the Levantine Expanse and thus takes her responsibilities too seriously, making her often clash with Corin due to his initially reckless attitude.
- Chuck Beyer as Robin Brady, a human student of Starfleet Academy who is assigned to Forrester's crew as the ship's engineer. He comes from Colorado, and is shown to be an introvert, but a gifted engineering prodigy, being able to "dismantle and rebuild a warp core on record time".
- Brett Donowho as Sturek, a Vulcan student of Starfleet Academy who is assigned to Forrester's crew as the ship's science officer. He is one of Forrester's closest friends, from computer classes prior to enrolling into the academy, and is considered "particularly brilliant even by Vulcan standards".
- Leslie Damon as Faith Gage, a human student of Starfleet Academy who is initially Robin's love interest and is later revealed to be behind a major incident within Starfleet Academy. She is also revealed to be a member of the Vanguard, a group of academy students who idolise Kirk in their shared hatred for the Klingons.
- Peter Flanders as Frank Malan, a human student of Starfleet Academy who is initially a rival to Forrester and is later revealed to be behind a major covert group within Starfleet Academy. He is also the founder and leader of the Vanguard terrorist group.
- Chris Weeks as Aex Rotherot, the headmaster of Starfleet Academy.
- Daamen J. Krall as Mav Marcai, an alien smuggler within the Starfleet Academy simulator. He also plays Thomas Horn, governor of Thaxius I and father to Margaret Horn, also in the simulator.
- Christina Parsa as Margaret "Maggie" Horn, a human smuggler within the Starfleet Academy simulator, who is daughter to the governor of Thaxius I, Thomas Horn.
- Ray Young as Kumas, a Klingon Governor within the Starfleet Academy simulator who acts against the orders of the Klingon High Council.
- Chris Cote as McNeal, a character within the Starfleet Academy simulator who is based on Khan Noonien Singh, from Star Trek II: The Wrath of Khan.
- Tom Farrell as Caldoss, a member of the Venturi race within the Starfleet Academy simulator.
- Christopher Thomas as Alshoff, a member of the Venturi race within the Starfleet Academy simulator.
- Bart McCarthy as Zashar, the Gorn captain of the starship "Long Flame" within the Starfleet Academy simulator.
- George Clifton as Duk'Ret, a Klingon character within the Starfleet Academy simulator.
- Kelly Kidneigh as Shantur Tenek, a Romulan Admiral within the Starfleet Academy simulator.

== Development ==
On the PC, the game is enhanced with numerous interactive live action (full motion video) scenes that can affect crew performance, and a storyline involving the Vanguard, a fictional terrorist group that appears only in this game. These scenes feature William Shatner as Captain James T. Kirk, Walter Koenig as Pavel Chekov, and George Takei as Captain Hikaru Sulu, as celebrity guest instructors at the school. The motion sequence director, Martin Denning, pioneered the use of green-screen filming to enable the camera to be moved freely in synch with the 3D CGI backgrounds - the first time this had ever been done. Interplay contracted Ron Jones, composer for several Star Trek: The Next Generation episodes, for the game's soundtrack, a CD of which was included in some versions of the game. Other versions came with an exclusive 3" metal miniature figure of the female Andorian cadet, Vanda M'Giia. Pocket Books released a novelization by Diane Carey.

The PC game received an expansion pack called Chekov's Lost Missions in 1998 that features seven new missions, two new multiplayer games, and various improvements to the game interface. Walter Koenig and George Takei make return appearances in the introductions to several of the new missions.

Interplay also announced a PlayStation version of the game, but it was not released.

== Reception ==
Reception

Review scores
Publication	Score
AllGame	3/5
CNET Gamecenter	7/10
Computer Games Strategy Plus	3/5
Computer Gaming World	3.5/5
EP Daily	7/10
GameRevolution	B−
GameSpot	5.6/10
MacLife	(Mac) "Spiffy"
Next Generation	3/5
PC Gamer (US)	67%
PC Zone	87%

Reviews were generally middling. Pelit's Niko Nirvi criticized that the PC version is unfinished and the flight model doesn't resemble Star Trek but is instead too similar to Wing Commander. Next Generation likewise opined that the simulation has the overall feel of flying a tiny fighter rather than commanding the large starships of the Star Trek universe, making it feel like just another Wing Commander clone, albeit a well-made one with high production values. GamePro also praised the game's high production values, noting the detailed texture maps, musical score, and use of sound effects from the television shows, but concluded that while Star Trek fans would enjoy the game, all others would be better off with Star Wars: X-Wing vs. TIE Fighter. (Note: GamePro gave the PC version two 4.5/5 scores for graphics and sound, and two 4/5 scores for control and fun factor.) Chris Gregson of GameSpot said the game suffered from having been put on hold while the producer worked on other projects, resulting in outdated gameplay and visuals at the time of release. He also felt the reliance on full motion video gave the sequences at the academy a non-interactive feel, and that while making the actual simulator portion a Wing Commander clone may have been a good idea, it does not hold up well against other Wing Commander clones due to its unnecessary busywork, limited arsenal, and average graphics.

Sales of the game reached 40,000 units within four days of its release. According to Interplay, its global sales surpassed 350,000 copies by mid-1998.

During the Academy of Interactive Arts & Sciences' inaugural Interactive Achievement Awards, Star Trek: Starfleet Academy was a finalist for "Computer Entertainment Title of the Year", "PC Simulation Game of the Year", "Outstanding Achievement in Sound and Music", and "Outstanding Achievement in Software Engineering"; however, these categories were ultimately awarded to StarCraft, Microsoft Flight Simulator 98, PaRappa the Rapper and GoldenEye 007, respectively. The game won the award for "Most Disappointing Game of the Year" in GameSpot's Best & Worst Awards for 1997.

== Legacy ==
A follow-up game was released in 2000: Star Trek: Klingon Academy.

On YouTube, a fan edit of cutscenes from Starfleet Academy and Klingon Academy was released under the name Star Trek – Starfleet Academy (The Movie).

== See also ==
- Star Trek: Starfleet Academy - Starship Bridge Simulator
