= AMF Xtreme Bowling 3D =

- Developers: Quicksilver Software; Vir2L Studios
- Publisher: Superscape
- Platforms: Java, BREW
- Release: June 2004
- Genre: Sports

AMF Xtreme Bowling 3D is a 2004 video game developed by Quicksilver Software with Vir2L Studios and published by Superscape.

== Gameplay ==
AMF Xtreme Bowling 3D presents a ten‑pin bowling simulation in which the player lines up and delivers each shot by adjusting a set of on‑screen meters that determine lane position, power, direction, and spin. Once these gauges are set, the bowler releases the ball, which travels down a fully rendered 3D lane toward the pins. Matches can be played either against other players or against the CPU in a tournament mode, and each frame proceeds through the same process of preparing and executing a bowl using the meter‑based controls.

== Development ==
In April 2004, Vir2L Studios announced an exclusive worldwide co-publishing deal to create and market a 3D bowling game for mobile phones based on the AMF Bowling brand. In February 2005, AMF Xtreme Bowling 3D was released to Verizon Wireless V Cast customers.

== Reception ==
Reception

Review scores
Publication	Score
Pocket Gamer	2/5
Wireless Gaming Review	7.3/10

Wireless Gaming Review called AMF Xtreme Bowling a good choice for VCAST subscribers. Pocket Gamer liked the graphics but disliked the sound.

AMF Xtreme Bowling 3D was a top 5 seller on both Vodafone and Verizon game decks.
