= Star Trek: Starfleet Command III =

2002 video game

Starfleet Command III
- Developer: Taldren
- Publisher: Activision
- Producer: Erik Bethke
- Designer: Scott Bruno
- Programmer: Marc Hertogh
- Artist: Bradley W. Schenck
- Composer: Danny Pelfrey
- Series: Star Trek
- Platform: Microsoft Windows
- Release: NA: November 21, 2002; EU: November 29, 2002
- Genres: Space simulation, real-time tactics
- Modes: Single-player, multiplayer

Star Trek: Starfleet Command III is a Star Trek video game published in 2002. It was the fourth entry in the Starfleet Command series, and one of the last Star Trek games to be released by Activision. The game involves the a story-driven series of missions for three factions, that is conducted by controlling starships that are developed with RPG elements. The game was released for Windows operating system, and received generally positive reviews.

In September 2021, the game was one of six Star Trek titles re-released on GoG.com in celebration of the franchise's 55th anniversary.

== Synopsis ==
=== Setting ===
The game takes place in the Next Generation/Deep Space Nine/Voyager era, and was intended to tie into the then upcoming film Star Trek: Nemesis.

=== Plot ===
The task of the player as the game progresses, is to begin in the service of the Klingon Empire, uncovering more and more of the plot line. This plot will take the player into the service of the Romulan Empire next, and then the Federation.

Klingon Empire - The player starts out as a young Klingon captain from a powerful House, going on errand missions, eventually escorting a convoy to a new Federation-Klingon station, Unity One. When treachery that hits very close to home is exposed, the player must prevent the destruction of Unity One and restore honor to their House.

Romulan Star Empire - Picking up where the Klingon campaign left off, the player assumes the role of a young Romulan captain under the wing of an admiral from the Tal Shiar intelligence agency, eventually joining in efforts to bring down Unity One and drive a wedge between the Federation and the Klingons. Using stolen Federation technology, the player helps to sow the seeds of chaos among the Federation and the Klingons, before finally assisting in the destruction of Unity One.

United Federation of Planets - With Unity One destroyed, and the Federation and the Klingon Empire on the verge of war, the player assumes the role of a young Starfleet captain who is recruited by Captain Jean-Luc Picard to assist in the investigation of the Unity One disaster, and bring those responsible to justice. When it becomes clear that the Romulans are responsible, the player undertakes several missions at the behest of, and occasionally assisting, Picard to eliminate the threat posed by the Tal Shiar. Eventually, the mastermind of the plot is apprehended, and the status quo between the three powers restored.

The Borg Collective was the fourth and final playable race, but their campaign had to be downloaded from the Activision website, and was unrelated to the main story campaign.

== Reception ==
Reception

Aggregate score
Aggregator	Score
Metacritic	78/100

Review scores
Publication	Score
Computer Games Magazine	3.5/5
Computer Gaming World	3/5
Game Informer	9.25/10
GameRevolution	B
GameSpot	8/10
GameSpy	4.5/5
GameZone	8.5/10
IGN	8.2/10
PC Gamer (US)	79%
X-Play	3/5
TheGamer	78/100

Starfleet Command III received "generally favorable reviews" according to the review aggregation website Metacritic.

Game Informer magazine gave the game a 9.25 out 10, and praised a "well written, and expertly implemented" story. They liked how the story could be worked through from three factions, Romulan, Federation, and Klingon, complemented by an "inspired" RPG elements for the mission. They also said the interface was "cool and easy to use," remarking "At no time was I scratching my Tribbles in confusion."
