= Master of Orion III =

2003 video game

- Macintosh cover art
- Developer: Quicksilver Software
- Publishers: Infogrames Interactive (Windows); MacSoft (Mac OS X)
- Director: Rantz A. Hoseley
- Producer: Cory Nelson
- Designers: Alan Emrich; Tom Hughes; William C. Fisher; Rantz A. Hoseley
- Programmer: Gregory Marsters
- Artist: Ross Worthley
- Writer: Katie Fisher
- Composer: Brian Williams
- Platforms: Microsoft Windows, Mac OS X
- Release: Microsoft Windows: NA: February 25, 2003; EU: March 7, 2003; Mac OS X: NA: March 28, 2003
- Genre: Turn-based strategy
- Modes: Single-player, multiplayer

Master of Orion III is a 4X turn-based strategy game and the third in the Master of Orion series. Master of Orion III was developed by Quicksilver Software and published by Infogrames Interactive on February 25, 2003.

== Backstory ==
In the Master of Orion III game manual, the player discovers that the planet called Antares in Master of Orion II: Battle at Antares was actually a forward base, "ConJenn". Following the events of Master of Orion II, the Antarans retaliated and defeated the young races of the Orion Sector, enslaving all of the people on every planet, and destroying all research and military centers, effectively making any retaliation impossible.

A thousand years later, the Antarans mysteriously disappeared due to an outbreak of their "Harvester" bioweapons program, which wiped out 98% of the population living in the Antaran sector. Survivors were left primarily on only two planets: Antares itself, and the Antarans living on the planet Orion, ruling the Orion Sector from Master of Orion II. Other Antarans survived in various smaller colonies and outposts throughout the galaxy.

The Antarans on Orion overseeing the younger races from Master of Orion II concluded that without backup from their powerful empire, changes would be necessary. Anticipating rebellion, they arrogantly declared themselves the "New Orions" (as opposed to the true ancient ones), and allowed a new Senate to be convened, made up of younger races. Half a dozen races from the previous games launched a rebellion, but were beaten into near extinction (isolated colonies and refuges of these races would remain throughout the sector). Rumors would also abound of a legitimate heir to the Orion throne.

Meanwhile, a group of isolated Antarans engineered a new bioweapon known as "Harvester Zeta". One of their scientists brought a shipment of these sentient parasites to the Orion sector, where they were released upon a Human outpost, wreaking terrible damage. However, being sentient, the Harvesters began to pursue their own agenda, spreading and forming colonies like other races, and giving themselves a new name, the "Ithkul".

== Gameplay ==
Master of Orion III is a turn-based strategy game with the goal of defeating the artificial intelligence (AI), or other players, in one of three ways. During each turn, the player makes all the decisions that will be performed during that turn, including exploration, colonization, diplomacy, trade, voting in the Senate, technological research, espionage, and the design, construction, and combat deployment of their space fleet. The player can leave most of those decisions to their planetary governors to handle, or they can make changes as they desire through a micromanagement system. All military incentive is responsibility of human player.

=== Victory conditions ===
The main planetary control screen of Master of Orion III with six submenus.

Victory conditions, set at the beginning of the game, include domination of the galaxy, leadership of the Senate, and discovery of the five Antaran X's. The easiest to achieve is leadership of the Senate where the periodic vote for leadership is based on the power of each voting member. The victory method with moderate difficulty is the discovery of the five Antaran X's through exploration and sending out of special high-priced exploration fleets. The most difficult method is galactic domination where the player must completely subjugate all other races in the galaxy.

=== Exploration and colonization ===
Colonization is of individual planets located in the numerous star systems randomly generated at the beginning of each game. Each star system will have from one to eight planets and each planet is rated on a scale of habitability related to your race's physical requirements. Red 2 and Red 1 planets are the least habitable to your species, with Yellow 2 and 1 and Green 2 and 1 designating increasingly friendly environments up to the so-called 'Sweet Spot', which is a planet perfectly suited to the player's race or the conquered race(s) the player may be using to colonize. The factors that can affect habitability include temperature, toxicity, atmospheric density and composition, and gravity level. The various races of the game each have preferred planet types, from terrestrial races preferring the variations of the Earth/Mars-type terrestrial worlds, to the etherian races that prefer Jupiter-type gas giants. Worlds of any type can be colonized, however, as technological advancements will allow the terraforming of worlds to suit your race's requirements, with the most hostile planets requiring more initial settlers and the population's growth rate being greatly reduced. Planets are discovered through exploration and trade. By sending a starship to a given system the player discovers the basic information on and an assessment of the habitability of each planet in that system. Extras such as pre-spaceflight magnate civilizations, stranded leaders, rare resources, and other unusual and unique attributes can add additional bonuses or penalties to each world. Information on star systems and their worlds can also be gained through trade negotiations with the other races resulting in an exchange of intelligence.

=== Diplomacy ===
In the Orion Senate, laws, treaties, and resolutions are voted upon and periodically the president is chosen. Declarations of war and peace, alliances, trade relationships, technological trade and outright blackmail are performed in the Senate. Votes are also periodically proposed on various laws that will be binding to all races in the galaxy (although you can opt out for a small penalty in race-relations). These can be rules of war, labor laws, taxes, and other regulations.

=== Technology ===
The key to success over the other races is through technological development where knowledge in six fields of research can be advanced. The six fields are Biological Sciences, Economics, Energy, Mathematics, Physical Sciences and Social sciences. Development in these fields will result in advancements in technology that can benefit all other aspects of gameplay, which may include the ability to terraform your worlds to better suit your race, the ability to create larger and more powerful space fleets, the ability to better equip ground troops, and the ability to develop stronger economic development tools and more capable spies.

=== Espionage ===
Espionage is broken into espionage and counter-espionage through the recruitment of spies. In order to spy on other empires, the players must have made contact with them. In order for them to spy on players, they must have made contact with them.

In Master of Orion 3, the players utilize own spies in several different ways. They can send in 6 different Types of Spies, who have different objectives:

- Military Spies: These spies will sabotage building fleets, shipyard buildings and ground troop support buildings.
- Diplomatic Spies: These spies will sabotage diplomatic efforts and destroy government buildings.
- Scientific Spies: These spies will either steal tech or sabotage research efforts.
- Political Spies: These spies will try to assassinate any leaders the enemy has.
- Social Spies: These spies will create unrest in colonies to slow down production, and attempt to incite rebellion.
- Economic Spies: These spies will sabotage and disrupt economic activities.

If the players do not deploy own spies, they will perform counter-espionage duties within the player's empire. Enemy spies who are caught or killed will be displayed in the situation report at the beginning of each turn.

=== Conquest ===
When the forces of two or more factions occupy the same star system, and at least one of the factions control spaceships in the system (battles between planets within a system will not occur), combat occurs and a combat management screen will be shown to the player with information on the enemy strength, own strength and where the fight will take place. This screen also gives the player the option to command his ships to intercept the enemy fleet if one is active in the system, attack the enemy planet if the enemy holds one in the system, or defend the player's planets in the system.

If neither of the forces are ordered to attack by the factions commanding them, combat will not occur, if one of the forces is ordered to attack, combat will occur in three phases: Space Combat, Planetary Bombardment, and Ground Combat.

Space Combat is fought in open space or near one of the star system's planets, which is determined by the attacker and defender at the beginning of combat. If the attacker's goal is the conquest of a planet in the system then the space combat will be fought near a planet with that planet's defenses included in the battle. If the attacker's goal is merely the destruction of the enemy space fleet or occupation of the star system then the battle can be fought in open space between the fleets only. If the "defender" commands his fleet to defend a planet within the system, the "attacker" will be unable to intercept the enemy fleet in open space, and can only attack the defending fleet by attacking the planet it protects.

The player can either manually control the fleet or allow the AI to take command. The player is not even required to watch the battle, but can let the game decide the outcome and display the resulting winner and the number of remaining ships. If the attacker is victorious in space with the goal of attacking one of the system's inhabited planets then the second phase of combat will follow.

Planetary Bombardment is what it sounds like, the attacker throws as much explosives on the attacked planet as he wants, and may then decide to attack with ground forces if he brought any. The Planetary Bombardment screen is only shown to the player when he is the one attacking. The screen shows what is on the planet in terms of civilian population, military units and buildings, as well as what's left on the planet when the bombardment is over. If the attacker decided to attack with his ground forces, Ground Combat will follow.

Ground Combat involves the confrontation of the attacker's landing ground forces against any of the enemy's ground forces that were previously assigned to that planet as well as a portion of the planet's population. Ground Combat can be fought over multiple game turns and is concluded when either of the forces are defeated. As in Space Combat the player can control the attack by designating an overall plan or allow the AI to take command, and the battle can be watched or allowed to play out with only the final results reported. Victory means gaining control of the planet, its surviving population, and all surviving planetary improvements.

Player-controlled Ground Combat is largely determined by a number of factors beyond the player's control; for example, terrain, gravity at the battlefield (not necessarily the gravity displayed on the planet overview—sometimes a high-gravity planet will inexplicably produce a zero-G battlefield), and weather. While the army creation screens do display the preferred ambient conditions of each type of unit, the Ground Combat screen fails to display the battle conditions that will be affecting the battle until after its conclusion. Subsequent battles on the same planet do not necessarily have the same battle conditions, making any attempt to prepare for certain conditions with a specialized ground unit impossible.

The one specific thing a player can plan for is to invade a planet that is preferable to the species that makes up the invasion force. This means, for instance, using troops composed of aquatic species rather than, say, humanoids to invade an aquatic planet. However, an aquatic planet doesn't guarantee the battlefield will be in an aquatic part of the planet; for all the player knows, the battle could take place in a desert. This is because this version of the game models planets in more detail than previous versions did; a planet's designation (e.g., "aquatic") reflects the dominant or most common type of terrain, whereas previous versions treated planets monolithically: water worlds are treated as all ocean, and so forth.

The overall battle plans available to the player (flank, trap, surprise, mass assault, etc.) are presented in the manual, although no game information about the battle plans themselves is made available.

== Development ==
In 2002, while the game was in development, a pre-alpha copy was accidentally released to an Australian game magazine, which published it as a demo. Not only was it not scheduled for release, but the game was also very buggy, and the incident caused some consternation at Infogrames. Not the least of their concerns were that it gave away some parts of the game they were hoping to keep secret, and showed things that weren't going to be in the final version. Because it was released by an Australian magazine, it became known informally as KangaMOO. More information is available from the official announcement.

== Reception ==
The game received mixed reviews. It has an aggregate GameRankings rating of 59 and a Metacritic score of 64 of a possible 100. Many reviewers cited the cumbersome interface, poor AI, and launch bugs as serious faults in the game, although it did receive some praise for its massive depth.

More than a decade after the game's release, a retrospective by Rock, Paper, Shotgun describes the game as both important and a catastrophic failure. The developers are commended for attempting to innovate in the genre of 4X games, which is said to have become stale and formulaic. According to their review, "it was released far too early, given a few cursory patches, and left to die at the hands of furious fans". Master of Orion 3 was intended to be a game of macromanagement, which didn't quite work. The player would set broad plans and issue orders from the top, trusting the AI to carry them out. This is described as "a maddening exercise in battling your own empire's broken AI for hours, only to discover that you've already overcome your only real opposition... you can just click 'end turn' a few hundred times and win without doing anything". Fan made patches are said to be partially successful in redeeming the game, but that only a few fringe players would truly enjoy it.

- GameSpot 6.7/10: "It lacks much of what made its predecessors such classics. The design relies on extensive automation to make it playable, and at its best, Master of Orion III succeeds in reducing the micromanagement that often plagues the later stages of games in this genre. But the combination of weak opponent AI, unappealing graphics, and having to second-guess the automation makes for an experience that is much less rewarding than you might hope".
- GameSpy 3/5: "The problem is that [the AI management] makes the game feel sterile. There simply isn't a whole lot to do. If you wanted to, you could let the game practically play itself".
- PC Gamer 57/100
- PC Game World 74/100
- Pelit 84% by Niko Nirvi, who later strongly recanted, calling the game "brain-dead" and lamenting that he'd rated it as though the AI was working.

=== Criticism ===
Although highly anticipated and much lauded by some gaming publications, Master of Orion III was only a moderate seller and not the breakout hit that the previous games had been. This is generally attributed to an unwieldy and cumbersome user interface, poor space battle AI, a number of software bugs that caused the game to crash and were never fixed (save for the two patches that addressed a few of the worst bugs, Infogrames provided no support following the game's release), the suppression of many popular features of the previous games (such as genocide and refitting of obsolete space ships) combined with the absence of many of the promised new features (such as racial ethos systems and colonization of moons and asteroids, as opposed to the player being limited to planets), and lack of micromanagement or the general character and charm of the predecessors. One significant problem was poor enemy AI (although subsequent community-created unofficial patches made small improvements).

None of the original development team was involved in the production.
