= Testament: Roleplaying in the Biblical Era =

2003 role-playing game supplement

Testament: Roleplaying in the Biblical Era is a 2003 role-playing game supplement published by Green Ronin Publishing.

== Contents ==
Testament: Roleplaying in the Biblical Era is a supplement in which the history and culture are explored for Israel, Egypt, Babylon, Canaan and Mesopotamia.

== Publication history ==
Shannon Appelcline noted that "The Mythic Vistas series (2003-2006) offered a variety of campaign backgrounds, from the swashbuckling Skull & Bones (2003) and the biblical Testament (2003), to Damnation Decade (2006), a tale of an alternate 1970s. Many of these books showed off Green Ronin's continued good relations with the rest of the d20 industry. Skull & Bones, for example, was co-authored by Gareth-Michael Skarka and later supported by his own Adamant Entertainment. Sidewinder: Recoiled (2004) was a new edition of a western previously released by Citizen Games. The Spirosblaak (2005) setting was supported by Misfit Studios. Testament (2003) was later supported by Highmoon Media Productions."

== Reviews ==
- Pyramid
- The Way, The Truth & The Dice (Vol 4 - Summer 2007)
- Fictional Reality (Issue 13 - Sep 2003)

== See also ==
- Trojan War: Roleplaying in the Age of Homeric Adventure
