= Brodie Lockard =

William Brodie Lockard is an American computer programmer who wrote the first computerized version of Mahjong solitaire on the PLATO system.

== Early life and education ==
His parents were Kirby and Dorothy Lockard (née Judge). Brodie grew up in Tucson, Arizona and attended Stanford University, initially majoring in English. He took courses in mathematics and computer science as he realised they might improve his luck in the job market. He befriended Jeffrey Chung, a pre-med student, who told him about the PLATO system, which he had seen in Hawaii. However, the system was not available in Stanford.

His father was a professor at the University of Arizona, which had access to the PLATO system and Professor Lockard wanted to use the system in his classes. Brodie worked for him, creating a tutorial. When he returned to Stanford, he made enquiries about renting a terminal, but discovered they were prohibitively expensive.

=== Accident ===
In December 1979 he suffered an accident while dismounting from a trampoline. He awoke in hospital, on a breathing apparatus, with his limbs paralyzed. He learned how to type with a mouth-stick and after his father reached out to CDC, Cindy Poulson of CDC visited Brodie, bringing her personal PLATO terminal for him to use.

=== Mahjong Solitaire ===
During his rehabilitation, Brodie was introduced to a tile-based board game, which was Mahjong solitaire, and implemented it on PLATO.

Brodie moved to Hawaii in 2000.
