= The Isle of Four Winds: Rune War =

1998 video game

- Developer(s): Arcanium Productions
- Publisher(s): Arcanium Productions
- Platform(s): Microsoft Windows, PlayStation
- Release: WW: 1998
- Genre(s): Mahjong, strategy video game
- Mode(s): Single-player, multiplayer

The Isle of Four Winds: Rune War is a video game developed and published by Arcanium Productions for the PC.

== Gameplay ==
The Isle of Four Winds: Rune War is a game which combines Mahjong with a strategy element.

== Reception ==
Next Generation reviewed the PC version of the game, rating it three stars out of five, and stated that "For gamers who've never played Mahjong, Rune War offers an excellent tutorial and is a good introduction to the game. Mahjong players looking for a new challenge may enjoy the strategy aspect but will probably find the game's well-implemented multiplayer support the most intriguing feature." Julia Scott of Strategy Plus gave the game three out of five stars, saying that "the AI is very strong. Even so, the best times with games like this are only had when your opponents walk, talk, and occasionally breathe".

== Reviews ==
- the game was also reviewed in Strategy Plus magazine
- company's archived official site lists additional coverage from PC Gamer UK
- Game.EXE ()
- listed at Allgame ()
