= Champions Universe =

Role-playing game supplement

Champions Universe is a supplement published by Hero Games/Iron Crown Enterprises (I.C.E.) in 1992 for the superhero role-playing game Champions.

== Contents ==
Champions Universe is a 186-page softcover book written by Monte Cook and 95 other authors, with illustrations by Storn Cook and Scott Heine. The book is a compilation of background information about the Champions universe. Material covered includes:

- timelines
- unusual places of the world
- brief outlines of major magicians and high technology agencies
- a summary of alien races
- the Paranormal Registration Act
- updates of the Champions super-team
- thumbnail sketches of the world's main organizations and media groups
- new villains
- a glossary of characters

An adventure scenario is also included.

== Reception ==
Sean Holland reviewed Normals Unbound in White Wolf #35 (March/April, 1993), rating it a 3 out of 5 and stated that "Overall the Champions Universe supplement is quite useful to a Champions gamemasters, especially ones who have not created a Champions Universe of their own."

In the September 1993 edition of Dragon (Issue #197), Allen Varney thought this book "succeeds fairly well", although he noted "shaky spelling and grammar." But Varney questioned the utility of the book: "While reading this book I kept asking, 'What does this accomplish? Who needs it?' If you already have a campaign, much of this book becomes redundant. If you can’t devise a campaign world of your own, the material here seems (a) too sketchy to help much and (b) not thought through." He concluded, "Even if you do need a pre-fab super campaign, Champions Universe won’t fill the role without other supplements to prop it up."

== Reviews ==
- Pyramid
