= Quicksilver Software =

American software developer

- Type: Privately owned
- Industry: Video games
- Founded: May 1, 1984
- Founder: Bill Fisher; Stephen Roney; Mike Breen
- Headquarters: Irvine, California, United States
- Products: Castles series Conquest of the New World; Star Trek: Starfleet Command; Master of Orion III
- Website: www.quicksilver.com

Quicksilver Software Inc. was an American privately owned video game developer based in Irvine, California, United States. The company was founded on May 1, 1984 by three former Mattel Electronics programmers: Bill Fisher, Stephen Roney, and Mike Breen. The company specializes in the creation of strategy, simulation, and educational products, and on focused high-technology research and development projects.

== History ==
Early in its history, Quicksilver landed a productive deal with arcade video game manufacturer Data East USA, Inc. that ultimately resulted in the creation of 28 different games for Apple II, Commodore 64, IBM PC, Mac, and Atari ST home computers. These included adaptations of well-known games such as Karnov and the Ikari Warriors series.

The company's work on another Data East title, Heavy Barrel, earned it the attention of publisher Interplay Productions, which contracted Quicksilver to develop what would become one of Interplay's first titles as an independent publisher, Castles for the IBM PC, which ultimately sold more than 400,000 copies. This was followed by additional strategy titles such as Castles II, Conquest of the New World (over 500,000 copies), and Star Trek: Starfleet Command (over 300,000 copies and several sequels).

Quicksilver also established an active relationship with publisher Activision. Beginning with some research and development work on Activision's digital video display technology, ultimately used in the top-selling title Return to Zork, Quicksilver rapidly expanded into developing a long series of four titles in the Shanghai line of tile-based solitaire games. Quicksilver also ported other titles for Activision, such as the Windows 3.1 and Mac OS versions of Zork: Nemesis and the DVD-ROM versions of Spycraft: The Great Game and Muppet Treasure Island.

At the same time, Quicksilver also worked on a series of educational software titles, such as the Math At Work line of math products and the highly acclaimed title Heritage: Civilization and the Jews, a massive 8.5-gigabyte interactive DVD-ROM version of the popular WNET television series. Quicksilver developed all of the underlying technology for Heritage, while the New York City-based asset development team created the content for the game.

From 2001 through 2005 Quicksilver developed a series of military training products for the U.S. Army and the Singapore Armed Forces. Its products, Full Spectrum Command and Full Spectrum Leader, are designed to provide cognitive training for company commanders and platoon leaders. During this same time period, the company created the strategy game Master of Orion III, a game now known for its lack of polish and steep learning curve. The company also developed two online games for the Rich Dad line of financial education games based on the board games CASHFLOW 101 and CASHFLOW 202.

In 2004, Quicksilver diversified into mobile and handheld games. The company developed several games for mobile phones, its best known product being AMF Xtreme Bowling, published by Vir2L Studios. In 2005, the company once again worked on a Star Trek title, Star Trek: Tactical Assault for the Nintendo DS and PlayStation Portable, published by Bethesda Softworks, and Star Trek: Conquest for the PlayStation 2 and Wii, also published by Bethesda Softworks.

In 2006 through 2008, Quicksilver released several additional military training titles, including a Patriot missile battery deployment trainer and an award-winning logistics trainer (DMCTI: Distribution Management Cognitive Training Initiative). As with Quicksilver's other military titles, these products were developed in conjunction with the Army-funded USC Institute for Creative Technologies (ICT).

In October, 2008, Quicksilver released Type to Learn 4 for publisher Sunburst, the latest in Sunburst's popular keyboard skill development lineup.

Also in October, 2008, Quicksilver released an interactive poker game show called The Real Deal at the Venetian Hotel and Casino in Las Vegas, Nevada.

In 2010, the company began working with restaurant company STACKED, ultimately collaborating with them to create the award-winning iPad user interface used in the restaurants as well as a companion consumer app and an online ordering Web site. Since then Quicksilver has added many new features to the restaurant and online components.

Quicksilver also developed a set of games for the Naval Postgraduate School in Monterey, California. This Navy-run training academy needed classroom games that would amplify and extend their instructional materials in areas such as counter-terrorism. Working with its long-term client, the USC Institute for Creative Technologies (ICT), Quicksilver worked on two different Web-based games, designing both the client and server software and deploying in the Amazon cloud.

During this same time, Quicksilver developed its own intellectual property around the delivery of digital comic books and other image-based media. The LongBox system was released, but ultimately did not attract sufficient content. However, the technology lived on, and in 2014 key components of the intellectual property were sold to a new organization that began adapting the core elements for a new, yet-to-be-announced series of products.

== Product list ==
Quicksilver has created a large number of titles since its founding in 1984. Unless otherwise noted, the company was responsible for full design and development of each title, including artwork and audiovisual elements. More recent projects include:

Publisher	Title and platforms	Release date(s)	Sales, if known
TimePlay	Real Deal Poker (programming)	October, 2008	N/A
U.S. Army	DMCTI Logistics Trainer	October, 2008	N/A
Sunburst Technologies	Type to Learn 4	October, 2008	N/A
Bethesda Softworks	Star Trek: Tactical Assault	October, 2006	N/A
Encore	Hoyle Casino 3D (completion from Alpha)	March, 2005	N/A
U.S. Army	Full Spectrum Leader (Windows)	March, 2005	N/A
Vir2L	AMF Xtreme Bowling 3D (Java/BREW phones)	June, 2004	not disclosed
U.S. Army	Full Spectrum Command 1.5 (Windows)	May, 2004	N/A
IDville	ID Maker (Windows)	2002	not disclosed
Rich Dad's Game LLC	Rich Dad's CASHFLOW 202 (Windows, Mac OS)	February, 2004	not disclosed
Rich Dad's Game LLC	Rich Dad's CASHFLOW 101 (Windows, Mac OS)	March, 2003	not disclosed
Atari	Master of Orion III (Windows, Mac OS)	February, 2003	over 200,000
Baudville	Award Maker 2003 (Windows, Mac OS)	2003	not disclosed
U.S. Army	Full Spectrum Command 1.0 (Windows)	February, 2003	N/A
Intellivision Productions	Intellivision Rocks, Windows Emulator	2002	not disclosed
Thirteen•WNET NY	Heritage: Civilization and the Jews (engine only)	2000–2005	unknown
Future Pastimes	Cosmic Encounter Online (design)	2000–2002	unknown
Interplay Productions	Star Trek: Starfleet Command (Windows)	July, 1999	over 300,000
Activision, Inc.	Shanghai: Second Dynasty (Windows, Mac OS)	December, 1999	over 100,000
Activision, Inc.	Shanghai: Dynasty (Windows, Mac OS)	1997	unknown
Activision, Inc.	Shanghai: Great Moments (Windows, Mac OS)	1997	over 600,000
Interplay Productions	Conquest of the New World (MS-DOS, Mac OS)	1996	over 500,000
Interplay Productions	Castles II: Siege and Conquest CD (MS-DOS, Mac OS)	1994	over 100,000
Interplay Productions	Castles (MS-DOS)	1991	over 400,000

The following is a list of earlier projects.

Publisher	Title and Platforms
Activision	Muppet Treasure Island (Windows/Mac OS DVD-ROM port)
Activision	Spycraft: The Great Game (Windows/Mac OS DVD-ROM port)
Activision	Zork: Nemesis (Windows 3.1 and Mac OS ports)
Activision	HyperBlade (Windows 3.1 completion)
Atari	Track and Field (Apple II)
Atari	APB (Atari Lynx)
Baudville	Award Maker Plus (IBM PC, Mac OS)
Baudville	Laser Award Maker (IBM PC, Mac OS)
Data East USA, Inc.	Bad Dudes (IBM PC, Apple II)
Data East USA, Inc.	Batman (Apple II)
Data East USA, Inc.	Commando (IBM PC, Apple II)
Data East USA, Inc.	Guerrilla War (IBM PC, Apple II)
Data East USA, Inc.	Heavy Barrel (IBM PC, Apple II)
Data East USA, Inc.	Ikari Warriors II (IBM PC, Apple II, Commodore 64)
Data East USA, Inc.	Ikari Warriors (IBM PC, Apple II, Commodore 64)
Data East USA, Inc.	Karnov (IBM PC, Mac OS, Atari ST)
Data East USA, Inc.	Kid Niki, Radical Ninja (Apple II)
Data East USA, Inc.	Lock-On (IBM PC, Mac OS, Atari ST)
Data East USA, Inc.	Platoon (IBM PC, Apple II)
Data East USA, Inc.	Tag Team Wrestling (Commodore 64, Apple II, IBM PC)
Davidson/Simon & Schuster	Maurice Ashley Teaches Chess (Windows)
Davidson	Kid Keys (MS-DOS, Mac OS)
Interplay Productions	Battle Chess (CDTV)
Interplay Productions	Battle Chess (FM TOWNS and Mac OS, combat animations)
Interplay Productions	Shadow of the Comet (PC, voice-over production)
SNK	Prehistoric Isle (IBM PC)
SNK	Ikari Warriors III (IBM PC)
