= Star Trek: Starfleet Command II: Empires at War =

2000 video game

- Developer: Taldren
- Publisher: Interplay Entertainment
- Designer: Erik Bethke
- Programmer: Marc Hertogh
- Artist: David T. Potter
- Composer: Inon Zur
- Series: Star Trek
- Platform: Microsoft Windows
- Release: NA: December 12, 2000; EU: December 22, 2000
- Genres: Space flight simulator game, Real-time tactics
- Modes: Single-player, multiplayer

Star Trek Starfleet Command II: Empires at War (known in North America as Starfleet Command Volume II: Empires at War) is the sequel to Star Trek: Starfleet Command and the second in the series of real-time space combat games, developed by Taldren, Inc. and published by Interplay. A stand-alone expansion pack was released in June 2001 titled Starfleet Command: Orion Pirates.

== Plot ==
The game features three singleplayer campaigns, two storyline campaigns, and a general conquest campaign. The first of the storyline campaigns dealt with the return of the Organians and their bringing the Interstellar Concordium in to 'pacify' the existing empires. The existing factions resist this pacification attempt, and a new war ensues. The other story campaign, only playable by the Mirak, Lyrans, Hydrans, and Klingons, deals with the discovery of artifacts belonging to an ancient race of telepaths.

== Reception ==
Star Trek: Starfleet Command II: Empires at War

Aggregate score
Aggregator	Score
Metacritic	77/100

Review scores
Publication	Score
AllGame	3.5/5
CNET Gamecenter	7/10
Computer Games Strategy Plus	3.5/5
Computer Gaming World	3/5
Game Informer	8.5/10
GameRevolution	B−
GameSpot	7.7/10
GameSpy	78%
IGN	8.5/10
Next Generation	4/5
PC Gamer (US)	73%

The game received "generally favorable reviews" according to the review aggregation website Metacritic. IGN praised the game's graphics and the lasting appeal of the game but also noted a steep learning-curve. John Lee of NextGen called it "a dandy space game, intense and challenging – but it's not for everyone. Whether you're a hardcore strategy addict with quick keyboard fingers or just a Star Trek wonk, you'll love it. If you dread overloaded control panels and the beefy manuals required to explain them, perhaps you should skip this flight."

According to Erik Bethke, sales of the game reached 120,000 units after six months on shelves.

The staff of Computer Games Strategy Plus nominated the game for their 2000 "Strategy Game of the Year" award, whose winner remains unknown.

== Expansion ==
Cover art for Orion Pirates

Starfleet Command: Orion Pirates is a stand-alone expansion released on June 28, 2001 in North America and on July 27, 2001 in Europe. The game adds eight separate playable pirate cartels based on the Orion Pirates.

Starfleet Command: Orion Pirates does not have a set story for the main galactic powers other than a generic campaign where a player fights against the pirates. Players who elect to play as one of the newly added cartels can choose between a generic campaign or a special pirate story campaign, which features a unique story, as well as missions that touch on events that happened in Empires at War.

=== Reception ===
Starfleet Command: Orion Pirates

Aggregate score
Aggregator	Score
Metacritic	78/100

Review scores
Publication	Score
Computer Games Magazine	3/5
Computer Gaming World	4/5
GameSpot	7.9/10
GameSpy	83%
IGN	7.8/10
PC Gamer (US)	78%

Orion Pirates received "generally favorable reviews" according to Metacritic.

Steve Butts of IGN said, "There are twelve new campaigns here along with 26 skirmish missions. Best of all there's a simple mission creator that lets you set up the engagements you'd like to see. Twelve multiplayer missions and three bonus missions based on the "A Piece of the Action" episode are included as well." Butts said the interface for ship to ship action is "well implemented enough" and "everything is laid out reasonably well", but "there are really far too many buttons on the interface for my tastes." He called the AI "robust" and said damage modeling in the game is "excellent", but said some of the ship's voice acknowledgements are bland. Butts said, "Sadly, there is no z-axis in the game" and said it detracts from the realism. He said, "the folks at Taldren...have tried to expand the promising Dynaverse II engine" but said "the system still has many of the shortcomings that plagued Empires at War." Butts noted, "Orion Pirates isn't compatible with previous versions of Starfleet Command." He said, "it seems a lot like just an expansion at first glance, but it's really more of a stand-alone mission pack with a few new features added," and that "the real meat of this game is the tactical combat model."

Giancarlo Varanini of GameSpot said the game "has an impressive amount of content for a stand-alone expansion." Varanini wrote, "Dynaverse II is a semipersistent universe where you can travel through the universe as any one of the races in the game, engage in battles with other players, and work your way up to getting new and more powerful ships," and that the game "includes a fully functional Dynaverse II mode out of the box, and it also contains new skirmishes, a new race, gameplay improvements, and basically all of the features of the original game." He said the single-player modes "are for the most part exactly the same as those in Starfleet Command Volume II, but there have been some changes made," and noted the skirmish mode with premade scenarios such as Star Trek II: The Wrath of Khan. He said, "the campaign mode still suffers from a poorly designed interface." He also wrote, "many of the early missions can be incredibly difficult" in the campaign mode, but said the game's best feature was "a working Dynaverse II", and that it adds a great deal of replay value to the game.
