= Star Trek: Starfleet Command =

1999 video game

Starfleet Command
- Developers: 14° East
- Publisher: Interplay Entertainment
- Producer: Erik Bethke
- Designer: Erik Bethke
- Programmers: Marc Hertogh; Michael Donovan Mandap
- Artists: Scott Bieser; Adam Rote
- Composer: Ron Jones
- Series: Star Trek
- Platform: Windows
- Release: NA: August 11, 1999; EU: October 1, 1999
- Genres: Space flight simulator Real-time tactics
- Modes: Single-player, Multiplayer

Star Trek: Starfleet Command is a computer game based on the table-top wargame Star Fleet Battles. It was developed by 14° East and Quicksilver Software and published by Interplay Entertainment. It was released in 1999 for Microsoft Windows. It simulates starship operations, ship-to-ship combat, and fleet warfare in the Star Trek universe. An expanded version was released in 2000 titled Star Trek: Starfleet Command - Gold Edition. It includes the latest patch and all the missions that were downloadable from the official website.

== Gameplay ==
Starfleet battlecruiser in open space.

The player chooses to represent one of the Star Trek factions, including the Gorn, the Hydran Kingdom, the Klingon Empire, the Lyran Empire, the Orion Pirates, the Romulan Star Empire, and the United Federation of Planets. Play can be a simple skirmish, or single- or multi-player mode.

Gameplay consists of maneuvering one's ship to approach enemy ships and assault them in the areas where various systems and ship's shields are vulnerable. It also consists of achieving various other objectives specified in mission assignment, which are provided at the beginning of each scenario. Depending on the specific assignment, this can include interacting with various ships, aliens, planetary bodies, and other objects in space.

== Plot ==
Though the game has no central story-mode campaign, players may play as a member of one of six stellar powers, each one having at least one elite organization that, when joined, will trigger special missions that tell various stories. Though having unique stories, each race's special missions all contribute expository information on the fate of a race known as the Organians and the effect that their departure from known space has since caused.

== Reception ==
Reception

Aggregate score
Aggregator	Score
GameRankings	83%

Review scores
Publication	Score
AllGame	4.5/5
CNET Gamecenter	9/10
Computer Games Strategy Plus	4/5
Computer Gaming World	4.5/5
Game Informer	8.5/10
GameFan	86%
GameRevolution	A−
GameSpot	7.5/10
GameZone	8.1/10
IGN	8.3/10
Next Generation	4/5
PC Accelerator	8/10
PC Gamer (UK)	79%

The game received "favorable" reviews according to the review aggregation website GameRankings. John Lee of NextGen called it "a complex real-time strategy game with a steep learning curve, but it's eminently rewarding."

According to Erik Bethke, sales of the game surpassed 350,000 copies after a year on shelves "without counting the Gold Edition and the Neutral Zone expansion." It was Interplay's best-selling game through direct sales, above Baldur's Gate.

The staff of Computer Games Strategy Plus nominated the game for their 1999 "Real-Time Strategy Game of the Year" award, which ultimately went to Age of Empires II: The Age of Kings. They wrote that the game "avoided the curse of the Star Trek game and produced a game of remarkable depth coupled with simple mechanics."

In 2016, Tom's Guide ranked the game as one of the top ten Star Trek games. A year later, PC Gamer ranked it among the best Star Trek games. Three years afterward, Screen Rant ranked it as the 4th best Star Trek game.

== See also ==
- Star Trek: Starfleet Command: Orion Pirates
- Star Trek: Starfleet Command II: Empires at War
- Star Trek: Starfleet Command III
