= List of Star Trek games =

The Star Trek science fiction franchise has inspired and been adapted into numerous games in many different formats, beginning in 1967 with a board game based on The Original Series and continuing through the present with online and DVD games.

== Board games ==
- Star Trek Game, the only game based on the original series to be released during the show's run, produced by Ideal Toys (1967)
- Star Trek game, produced by Hasbro (1974)
- Star Trek game, produced in UK by Palitoy (1975)
- Star Trek game, produced by Milton Bradley, based on Star Trek: The Motion Picture (1979)
- Star Trek: Starfleet Game, a promotional game released by McDonald's to coincide with the first movie (1979)
- Struggle for the Throne, produced by FASA (1984). Players control factions fighting in a succession crisis in the Klingon Empire.
- The Search for Spock, produced by FASA (1984)
- Star Trek: The Adventure Game, produced by West End Games (1985)
- Star Trek: The Enterprise 4 Encounter, produced by West End Games (1985)
- Golden Trivia Game: Star Trek Edition (1985), Golden Books
- Golden Trivia Cards: Star Trek Edition (1985)
- Star Trek: The Game, produced by Classic Games (1992)
- How to Host a Mystery - Star Trek: The Next Generation, produced by Decipher in the U.S. and Canada Games in Canada (1992)
- Star Trek: The Next Generation Interactive VCR Board Game – A Klingon Challenge, the only Star Trek: The Next Generation video board game, although a second game involving Q and The Borg was planned. This game was produced by Decipher (1993)
- Trivial Pursuit: Star Trek Edition VCR Game, a "Sci-Fi Master Game" supplement for the main game, made by TelStar Video Entertainment (1995)
- Monopoly, produced by Hasbro licensee USAopoly in three versions; one representing the original Star Trek series (2000), another featuring Star Trek: The Next Generation (1998), and Star Trek: Continuum Edition Monopoly, covering all five series (2009)
- Scene It? Star Trek, developed by Screenlife Games and Mattel. Contains Star Trek TV and movie clips from all 5 live action series and the first 10 movies (2009)
- Star Trek: Expeditions, developed by Reiner Knizia and WizKids, taking place in the new continuity established by the latest movie (2011)
- Star Trek: Fleet Captains, developed by WizKids, a tactical game where players create fleets out of a selection of Federation and Klingon ships and battle to control hex based sectors (2011)
- Star Trek Catan, created by Mayfair Games, is a TOS themed version of the board game The Settlers of Catan (2012)

=== Tabletop wargames ===
- Star Trek Battle Manual, designed and published by Lou Zocchi in 1972. Unlike most other games in this category, it was played without a board. Ships maneuvered on the tabletop using rulers to determine range and protractor-like angle measures on the large counters to determine facing. The game was produced without authorization from Paramount Pictures, leading to its reissue in 1973 as the Alien Space Battle Manual with all Star Trek references removed, followed by a further release in 1977 as the Star Fleet Battle Manual after Zochi obtained a license from Franz Joseph Designs for material in the Star Fleet Technical Manual.
- Star Fleet Battles, the seminal tactical tabletop wargame created by Steven V. Cole and produced by Task Force Games in 1979. Like Zocchi's Star Fleet Battle Manual, it also made use of a license from Franz Joseph Designs. It has had four major editions and is currently published by Amarillo Design Bureau, Inc.
- Federation Commander, a more streamlined tactical tabletop wargame in the Star Fleet Universe produced by Amarillo Design Bureau, Inc. in 2005.
- A Call To Arms: Star Fleet is another hexless game (using miniatures) set in the Star Fleet Universe. Published in 2011, it is a collaboration between Amarillo Design Bureau and Mongoose Publishing, using a variant of the system seen in Babylon 5: A Call To Arms.
- Federation Space, a strategic companion to Star Fleet Battles produced by Task Force Games in 1981.
- Federation and Empire, the second and more elaborate strategic game set in the Star Fleet Universe, first published by Task Force Games in 1986 and presently by Amarillo Design Bureau, Inc.
- The Star Trek II: Starship Combat Simulator, Star Trek III Starship Combat Roleplaying Game, and Star Trek: Starship Tactical Combat Simulator, all published by FASA Corporation in the 1980s, based on the combat system from the Star Trek: The Role Playing Game
- Star Trek: Red Alert!, published by Last Unicorn Games in 2000, and based on the Diskwars system from Fantasy Flight Games.
- Star Trek: Attack Wing, published by Wizkids in 2013, and based on the "FlightPath maneuver system" from the Star Wars: X-Wing Miniatures Game under license from Fantasy Flight Games.

== Card games ==
- Star Trek Customizable Card Game, produced by Decipher.
- Star Trek: The Card Game, produced by Fleer.
- Star Trek: Deck Building Game, produced by Bandai. It consists of three stand-alone, integrable editions: Star Trek Deck Building Game: The Next Generation (2011), Star Trek Deck Building Game: The Next Generation – Next Phase (2012) and Star Trek Deck Building Game: The Original Series (2012)
- Star Fleet Battle Force, produced by Amarillo Design Bureau, Inc.

== Role-playing games ==
Official game titles include the following:

- Star Trek: Adventure Gaming in the Final Frontier, produced by Heritage Models (1978)
- Starfleet Voyages, produced by Terra Games Company (1982)
- Star Trek: The Role Playing Game, the original Star Trek RPG produced by FASA (1982)
- Prime Directive, designed by Amarillo Design Bureau, Inc. and published by Task Force Games (1993). Later editions were produced for the GURPS 3rd edition (2002), 4th edition (2005), d20 (2005) and d20 Modern (2008).
- Star Fleet Warlord, a play-by-email game currently published by Franz Games (1995)
- Star Trek: The Next Generation Role-playing Game, produced by Last Unicorn Games (1998) and derived in two other standalone games:
  - Star Trek: Deep Space Nine Role-playing Game (1999)
  - Star Trek: The Original Series Role-playing Game (1999)
- Star Trek Roleplaying Game, produced by Decipher, Inc. (2002)
- Star Trek Simulation Forum, has served as the chat based role-playing game of the official Star Trek website since October 2002. Remains the only simming organization currently recognized by the site (2002)
- Star Trek Adventures, produced by Modiphius Entertainment (2017)

== Starship simulator games ==
Starship simulator games create the experience of commanding and operating a starship, and usually allow the player to handle a variety of functions, and to allocate resources such as ship power and systems. Some early Star Trek games in this category have had a huge effect on subsequent games in their genre often leading to new level of depth and complexity in programming or gameplay.

This game category includes both computer games and non-computer board games, since the Star Fleet Battles game series provides a starship simulation, and is wholly a tabletop board wargame. As well as the Star Trek RPG by FASA which allowed players to take charge of specific areas of a ship's functions (such as the engineer allocating power) during combat.

Star Fleet Battles is different from most other wargames, which usually indicate unit strengths with simple numerical ratings. SFB players are able to deploy and manage power for a variety of ship weapons and resources. This is done via an elaborate Energy Allocation mechanism where even partial points of energy can be allocated to a number of different systems. Federation Commander is the continued development of this system in a more fast-paced version. Instead of the Energy Allocation system, it uses an innovative tick sheet system, which manages power use for each ship, and also tracks which weapons and systems are in use. The Star Trek: Starfleet Command computer game is based upon Star Fleet Battles.

In Star Trek: The Role Playing Game, produced by FASA, players actually had individual bridge functions during combat. This at one point became a separate game known as Starship Tactical Combat Simulator. The Captain determined the strategy, the Engineer was responsible for power management and allocation to different systems such as weapons and shields, the Helmsman for firing weapons, the Navigator for managing deflector shields, the Communications Officer for damage control and so on.

Starship simulator computer games which are set in the Star Trek universe occupy a large role in the history of computer games. Some of the earliest and more influential space simulator video games were Star Trek simulations designed to run on mainframes.

David H. Ahl played such games in the late 1960s at Carnegie Mellon University and the University of California, Berkeley. He stated that they were much less sophisticated than Mike Mayfield's Star Trek text game, which originated as a BASIC program on an SDS Sigma 7 mainframe system in 1971 and ported to many different systems. Ahl published source code for this game in his best selling BASIC Computer Games, and variants of the game spread widely to personal computer systems.

Decwar in 1978 was also a game in the genre. Another is Super Star Trek, an early text-based, MS-DOS-based game. This game created a starship experience using only text-based commands and graphics. The game Begin is considered notable for having a convincing model of game dynamics, as it has very few random elements, and is highly mathematical. In 1986, the game Multi-Trek (MTrek) was brought online at the University of California, Santa Cruz. Written in C for a PDP mainframe, and also available via dialup and later TELNET, MTrek was arguably the first ever game to combine a persistent world, online multiplayer environment with a real-time, true 3-dimensional game engine and versions of the game still have an active player base.

Netrek was released in 1988, and was probably the first game to use both the TCP and UDP protocols, the first Internet-aware team game, the first Internet game to use metaservers to locate open game servers, and the first to have persistent user information.

In later years, fewer games were produced within this genre, and more games were produced in the adventure games genre. The first new recent game was Starfleet Academy, which incorporated many Star Trek elements, but was criticized for depicting starship operation as more akin to fighter planes than capital ships. A sequel, Klingon Academy, was quite different, and was one of the first games to depict starship operation with an appropriate amount of complexity.

The Starfleet Command game series released by Interplay was based largely on the tabletop game Star Fleet Battles, and comprised Starfleet Command, Starfleet Command II: Empires at War, and Starfleet Command III. It constitutes one of the most definitive current games, depicting a wide array of ship systems and Star Trek storylines. This series had a more naval flavor, and depicted a number of ship systems. This series spawned a very large multiplayer ladder competition first with the "Starlance" system, and later on the "GamerZone" ladder. The main multiplayer setting is the "Dynaverse," which began as an official server hosted by Taldren, and has continued as a private effort (an earlier, unauthorized adaptation of Star Fleet Battles as a computer game was SSI's The Warp Factor in 1982).

Star Trek: Bridge Commander was another addition to this genre, reflecting the more deliberative, command aspects of this experience.

In late 2006, Bethesda Softworks released several console games which carry on the tradition of classic Star Trek ship simulator/combat games, Star Trek: Legacy for the PC and Xbox 360, Star Trek: Encounters for the PlayStation 2, Star Trek: Tactical Assault for the Nintendo DS and the PlayStation Portable and Star Trek: Conquest for the Wii and PlayStation 2.

Several online games have appeared on the Internet. Vega Trek is a game mod which is planned to eventually become active as a multiplayer game. Flashtrek: Broken Mirror, first created by Vex Xiang, is one of the online Star Trek games, and is entirely browser-based. It has spawned several sequels. One sequel was created by Vex Xiang, and multiple others were created by fans. A newer game titled Star Trek: Broken Mirror was being developed by a man named Darkwing for several years, but was apparently abandoned in 2014.

Star Trek: Bridge Crew is one of the newest additions to this genre, and continues the historical pattern of Star Trek-themed simulator breaking new ground. This cross platform game is in a virtual reality environment in which four players actually occupy the bridge of the USS Aegis, Enterprise-D (Through Downloadable Content) or the Original Enterprise. Players get to see each other in real-time, and interact during the game to operate the ship and work together to handle various game scenarios.

== Pinball games ==
Four physical pinball games have been based on the Star Trek series:

- Star Trek, released by Bally in 1979, designed by Gary Gayton with artwork by Kevin O'Connor.
- Star Trek: 25th Anniversary, released by Data East Pinball in 1991.
- Star Trek: The Next Generation, created by pinball designer Steve Ritchie and released by Williams Electronics in November 1993 as part of Williams' SuperPin series. A recreation of this table was released for The Pinball Arcade in 2013 and available until expiration of the Williams license in 2018. Another version was released for Pinball FX on August 24, 2023.
- Star Trek, created by Steve Ritchie and released by Stern in 2013 with pro, premium, and LE variants. A recreation of this table was released for Stern Pinball Arcade in 2016, and The Pinball Arcade in 2018.
- Kelvin Timeline, Discovery, and Deep Space Nine were released as a pack of 3 digital pinball tables, titled 'Star Trek Pinball', by Zen Studios for Pinball FX on December 7, 2023.

== Video games ==
=== Arcade ===
Year	Title
1983	Star Trek - Strategic Operations Simulator
2000	Star Trek: Borg Contact
2002	Star Trek: Voyager – The Arcade Game

=== Computer ===
The history of the Star Trek personal computer game franchise began as early as 1971, with a Star Trek text-only computer game written in BASIC. Many PC titles have since been published, and the franchise was one of the first based on a TV program to break into the young PC gamer market in the 1990s. Activision and Viacom signed an agreement to develop games based on the Star Trek property in September 1998.

Interplay, Simon & Schuster, MicroProse and Activision released most of the best-known Star Trek games between 2000 and 2003. Titles like Star Trek: Armada, Star Trek: Elite Force and Star Trek: Bridge Commander were all published during this period, as were over half of all the other major Star Trek PC games. The absence of new titles after 2003 was due in large measure to a split and subsequent lawsuit between Activision and Viacom which ended in 2004.

With the departure of Activision in 2003, the franchise under the tenure of Paramount effectively came to a close. Since the end of 2005, CBS has assumed most franchise management, including games and other products. Even with no new licensed titles released during 2003-2006, the older games like Armada and Elite Force still have an avid fan base which keeps the small community going. Development of the new Star Trek: Online title is complete and the game was made available for sale on February 2, 2010.

Star Trek: Alien Domain is a 2015 flash-based Star Trek multiplayer strategy game developed by GameSamba in conjunction with CBS Interactive.

Year	Title	Platform	Developer, publisher
1971	Star Trek (text game)	Multiple	Mike Mayfield
1971	Star Trek (script game)	PDP-10	Don Daglow
1973	Super Star Trek	Multiple (BASIC)	Bob Leedom, David H. Ahl
1973	Trek73	HP Time-Shared BASIC	William K. Char, Perry Lee, Dan Gee
1976	Galaxy	8008, 8080, SCELBI	Bob Findley, SCELBI Computer Consulting
1977	Star Trek	Apple 1	Bob Bishop, Interface Age
1978	Time Trek	Commodore PET	Brad Templeton, Personal Software
1978	Time Trek / Space Warp	TRS-80	Joshua Lavinsky, Personal Software
1979	Apple Trek	Apple II	Wendell Sander, Apple Computer
1979	Star Trek III	TRS-80, Apple II, Atari 8-bit	Adventure International
1980	3-D Star Trek	Atari 8-bit	Color Software
1980	Battle Trek	TRS-80	Gilman Louie, Voyager Software
1981	Tari Trek	Atari 8-bit	Quality Software
1982	Video Trek 88	MS-DOS	Windmill Software
1983	Star Trek: Strategic Operations Simulator (ports)	Apple II, Atari 8-bit, ColecoVision, C64, VIC-20	Sega
1984	Begin: A Tactical Starship Simulation	MS-DOS	Clockwork Software
1985	Star Trek Evolution	C64	Load'n'Go / One Step / Green Valley Publishing
1985	Star Trek: The Kobayashi Alternative	Apple II, C64, MS-DOS	Simon & Schuster
1986	Star Trek: The Promethean Prophecy	Apple II, C64, MS-DOS	Simon & Schuster
1987	Star Trek: The Rebel Universe	Atari ST, C64, MS-DOS	Simon & Schuster
1988	Star Trek: First Contact	MS-DOS	Micromosaics, Simon & Schuster Interactive
1989	Star Trek V: The Final Frontier	MS-DOS	Level Systems, Mindscape
1989	Star Trek: The Next Generation - The Transinium Challenge	MS-DOS, Macintosh	TRANS Fiction Systems, Simon & Schuster
1991	Begin 2	MS-DOS	Clockwork Software
1992	Star Trek: 25th Anniversary	MS-DOS, Macintosh, Amiga	Interplay Entertainment
1993	Star Trek: Judgment Rites	MS-DOS, Macintosh	Interplay Entertainment
1993	Rescue!	Macintosh	Tom Spreen
1995	Star Trek: The Next Generation – A Final Unity	MS-DOS, Macintosh	Spectrum HoloByte, MicroProse
1996	Star Trek: Klingon	Windows, Macintosh	Simon & Schuster
1996	Star Trek: Borg	Windows, Macintosh	Simon & Schuster
1996	Star Trek: Deep Space Nine: Harbinger	MS-DOS, Macintosh	Stormfront Studios, Viacom New Media
1997	Star Trek: Starfleet Academy	Windows, Macintosh	High Voltage Software, Interplay Entertainment
1997	Star Trek Generations	Windows	MicroProse
1998	Star Trek Pinball	MS-DOS	Interplay Entertainment
1998	Star Trek: The Next Generation: Klingon Honor Guard	Windows, Macintosh	MicroProse
1998	Star Trek: The Game Show	Windows, Macintosh	Sound Source Interactive
1998	Star Trek: Starship Creator	Windows, Macintosh	Imergy, Simon & Schuster
1999	Star Trek Trivia Challenge	Windows	Sound Source Interactive
1999	Star Trek: The Next Generation: Birth of the Federation	Windows	MicroProse, Hasbro
1999	Star Trek: Secret of Vulcan Fury	Cancelled	Interplay Entertainment
1999	Star Trek: Starfleet Command	Windows	Quicksilver Software, Interplay Entertainment
1999	Star Trek: Hidden Evil	Windows	Presto Studios, Activision
2000	Star Trek: Starfleet Command - Gold Edition	Windows	Quicksilver Software, Interplay Entertainment
2000	Star Trek: Armada	Windows	Mad Doc Software, Activision
2000	Star Trek: Deep Space Nine: The Fallen	Windows, Macintosh	The Collective, Simon & Schuster
2000	Star Trek: ConQuest Online	Windows	Genetic Anomalies, Activision
2000	Star Trek: Klingon Academy	Windows	14 Degrees East, Interplay Entertainment
2000	Star Trek: New Worlds	Windows	14 Degrees East, Interplay Entertainment
2000	Star Trek: Starfleet Command II: Empires at War	Windows	Taldren, Interplay Entertainment
2000	Star Trek: Starship Creator Warp II	Windows	Imergy, Simon & Schuster Interactive
2000	Star Trek: Voyager – Elite Force	Windows, Macintosh	Raven Software, Activision
2001	Star Trek: Voyager - Elite Force Expansion Pack	Windows	Raven Software, Activision
2001	Star Trek: Deep Space Nine: Dominion Wars	Windows	Gizmo Games, Simon & Schuster
2001	Star Trek: Armada II	Windows	Mad Doc Software, Activision
2001	Star Trek: Away Team	Windows	Reflexive Entertainment, Activision
2001	Star Trek: Starfleet Command: Orion Pirates	Windows	Taldren, Interplay Entertainment
2002	Star Trek: Starfleet Command III	Windows	Taldren, Activision
2002	Star Trek: Bridge Commander	Windows	Totally Games, Activision
2003	Star Trek: Elite Force II	Windows, Macintosh	Ritual Entertainment, Activision
2005	Star Trek: The Next Generation: Stranded	Sky Gamestar (ceased 2015)	Denki
2006	Star Trek: Legacy	Windows, Xbox 360	Mad Doc Software, Bethesda Softworks
2009	Star Trek: DAC	Windows, Xbox 360, Macintosh, PlayStation 3	Naked Sky Entertainment, Paramount Digital Entertainment
2010	Star Trek Online	Windows, Xbox One, PlayStation 4	Atari, Cryptic Studios, Perfect World Entertainment
2010	Star Trek Fyne	Windows	JH-Games
2013	Star Trek	Windows, Xbox 360, PlayStation 3	Digital Extremes
2015	Star Trek: Alien Domain	Browser	GameSamba
2016	Star Trek Timelines	Browser, iOS, Android	Disruptor Beam
2017	Star Trek: Bridge Crew	Windows, PlayStation 4	Ubisoft
2022	Star Trek Prodigy: Supernova	Xbox Series X, PlayStation 5, Windows	Outright Games
2023	Star Trek: Resurgence	Xbox Series X, PlayStation 4, PlayStation 5, Windows	Dramatic Labs
2023	Star Trek: Infinite	Windows, macOS	Paradox Interactive
2026	Star Trek: Voyager – Across the Unknown	Xbox Series X, PlayStation 4, PlayStation 5, Windows	Gamexcite, Daedalic Entertainment
2026	Star Trek: Infection	Windows	Played with Fire
2026	Star Trek: Outposts Unknown	Windows, MacOS	Magic Fuel Games
2026	Star Trek: Warp	Windows, MacOS	Monumental, Plarium Games
2027	Star Trek: Shadow Frontier	Nintendo Switch 2, PlayStation 5, Windows, Xbox Series X/S	Bloober Team

=== Console ===
Year	Title	Platform	Developer Publisher	Notes	Ref.
1979	Star Trek: Phaser Strike	Microvision			
1982	Star Trek: The Motion Picture	Vectrex			
1983	Star Trek: Strategic Operations Simulator	Atari 2600, Atari 5200, Atari 8-bit, ColecoVision, VIC-20, C64, TI-99/4A			
1992	Star Trek: 25th Anniversary	NES			
1992	Star Trek: 25th Anniversary	Game Boy			
1993	Star Trek: The Next Generation	Game Boy, NES, Game Gear (as Star Trek: The Next Generation - The Advanced Holodeck Tutorial)			
1994	Star Trek: The Next Generation Echoes from the Past (Genesis) / Future's Past (Super NES)	Genesis, Super NES			
1994	Star Trek Generations: Beyond the Nexus	Game Boy, Game Gear			
1994	Star Trek: Starfleet Academy Starship Bridge Simulator	32X, Super NES			
1994	Star Trek: Deep Space Nine – Crossroads of Time	Genesis, Super NES			
2000	Star Trek: Invasion	PlayStation			
2000	Star Trek: Voyager – Elite Force	Windows, MacOS 9, PS2			
2004	Star Trek: Shattered Universe	PS2, Xbox			
2006	Star Trek: Tactical Assault	PlayStation Portable, Nintendo DS			
2006	Star Trek: Legacy	Xbox 360, Windows			
2006	Star Trek: Encounters	PS2			
2007	Star Trek: Conquest	Wii, PS2			
2009	Star Trek: DAC	Xbox 360, PS3			
2013	Star Trek	Xbox 360, PS3, Windows			
2016	Star Trek Online	Xbox One, PS4, Windows, Mac			
2017	Star Trek: Bridge Crew	PS4, Windows			
2024	Star Trek: Legends	Xbox Series X, PS4, PS5, Switch, Windows	Emerald City Games Tilting Point	Originally released on iOS in 2021. Discontinued: unlisted in 2026 and servers sunset on September 3, 2026.	
2022	Star Trek: Prodigy: Supernova	Xbox Series X, PS4, PS5, Switch, Windows	Tessera Studios Outright Games		
2023	Star Trek: Resurgence	Xbox One, Xbox Series X, PS4, PS5, Windows	Dramatic Labs Bruner House		
2026	Star Trek: Voyager – Across the Unknown	Xbox Series X, PS5, Windows			

=== Mobile ===
Year	Title	Platform	Developer, Publisher	Notes	Ref.
2009	Star Trek: The Mobile Game	iOS	Electronic Arts		
2014	Star Trek Trexels	iOS, Android	Xcube Games, YesGnome		
2016	Star Trek Timelines	iOS, Android	Disruptor Beam		
2018	Star Trek Trexels II	Android	Kongregate		
2018	Star Trek Fleet Command	iOS, Android	Scopely		
2021	Star Trek: Legends	iOS (Apple Arcade)	Tilting Point		

== Electronic and casino games ==
- Star Trek is a casino slot machine game designed and marketed by WMS Industries since 2008
- Star Trek: Voyager - Delta Quest, video game gambling machine.

== Handheld electronic games ==
Numerous stand-alone electronic handheld and tabletop games have been produced by manufacturers like Bandai, Coleco, Konami, and others.

== See also ==
- Netrek
- List of games in Star Trek
- The Warp Factor
