= Star Trek Roleplaying Game Narrator's Guide =

Role-playing game supplement

- Designers: Matthew Colville; Kenneth Hite; Ross S. Isaacs; Steven S. Long; Don Mappin; Christian Moore; Owen Seyler
- Illustrators: George Vasilakos; Michael Vrana; Dan Burns
- Publishers: Decipher, Inc.
- Publication: 2002
- Genres: Star Trek

Star Trek Roleplaying Game Narrator's Guide is a supplement published by Decipher, Inc. in 2002 for Star Trek Roleplaying Game.

== Contents ==
Star Trek Roleplaying Game Narrator's Guide provides information needed by gamemasters in order to design and run campaigns in the Star Trek universe. The book contains three sections:

1. Series Creation: Where and when is the campaign set? Who are the major players and the dominant species?
2. Playing the Game: Steven Creech summarizes this as "how to build the setting by establishing some common ground for your players such as a base of operations (be it starship or space station), a crew, the level of technology, and the things that form the adversity and diversity your players will encounter." The rules for the CODA system used in the game are explained.
3. Narrator Resources: How to create starships. A background on space. Some notable characters from the various series and movies are translated into game terms.

== Publication history ==
The first license for a Star Trek role-playing game was granted in 1978 to Heritage Models, who produced Star Trek: Adventure Gaming in the Final Frontier. This was followed by licensed RPGs by Terra Games (1982), FASA (1982), Amarillo Design Bureau (1993), Franz Games (1995), and Last Unicorn Games (1998). In 2002, Decipher Inc. absorbed Last Unicorn, and as Shannon Appelcline noted, "The old Last Unicorn crew created a totally new gaming system for Decipher and released it in a single Star Trek Roleplaying Game: Player's Guide (2002) that covered all the various eras." This was immediately followed by the Star Trek Roleplaying Game Narrator's Guide, a 256-page book designed by Matthew Colville, Kenneth Hite, Ross S. Isaacs, Steven S. Long, Don Mappin, Christian Moore, and Owen Seyler, with graphic design by George Vasilakos, and cover art by Michael Vrana and Dan Burns.

== Reception ==
In Issue 4 of D20Zine, Steven Creech liked the quality of the production, noting, "Decipher has set a standard that few publishers come close to regarding the professionalism of their layout. Not only do the books come filled with photographic stills from the various series, but the text is laid out in such a way that it is extremely easy to read and even locate a specific heading ... Decipher really need to give their graphics layout team a raise. They deserve every penny." Creech concluded, "Anyone who is a Star Trek fan and has dreamed of playing in that universe has perhaps the best system done yet at his fingertips ... it is a simple, easy to use game system that allows you to focus on creating your worlds and not spend so much time on looking up rules."

Andy Vetromile, writing for Pyramid, pointed out "The editing seems to get worse as the book proceeds, and the graphic design isn't nearly as good as that of the Player's Guide. There seems to be more text here, which squishes the still shots from the movies and TV series down and makes them look grainy and dark, leaving a lot less to look at." Despite this, Vetromile concluded, "Looking beyond some of these flaws, though, the Star Trek Narrator's Guide is a good book, a good buy, and, combined with the Player's Guide, a good way to get the Enterprise and its offspring back onto the game store shelves where they belong."

In the German RPG magazine Envoyer, André Wiesler noted, "The Narrator's Guide suffers from the same weaknesses and exhibits the same strengths as the Player's Guide. The background information is excellent, indeed exemplary, in its preparation and presentation, and it is visually pleasing. The rules, however, suffer from overly complicated mechanisms." Wieskler pointed out, "The rule mechanisms proposed for the various non-combat operations aboard a ship are once again highly complex and dependent on the specific situation. What takes only seconds in the series ("recalibrate the right sensor array") will likely require lengthy calculations under the CODA system." Wiesler concluded, "The quality gap between the rules and the background is striking. The rules themselves are far from convincing, while the presentation of the Star Trek universe is unparalleled and highly recommended for all Star Trek fans, especially beginners. My recommendation: buy it and use a different rules system."

== Other reviews and commentary ==
- Legions Realm Monthly (Issue 13 - Oct 2003)
- Anduin (Issue 80 - Feb 2003)
