= Star Trek Roleplaying Game (Decipher) =

Tabletop role-playing game

- Star Trek Roleplaying Game Player's Guide cover
- Designers: Matthew Colville, Kenneth Hite, Ross S. Isaacs, Steven S. Long, Don Mappin, Christian Moore & Owen Seyler
- Publishers: Decipher, Inc.
- Publication: 2002
- Genres: Science fiction (Star Trek)
- Systems: CODA System

Star Trek Roleplaying Game is a role-playing game (RPG) set in the Star Trek universe using the CODA System rules and first published by Decipher, Inc. in 2002. When Decipher acquired the rights to create the RPG, they also acquired most of the gaming studio from Last Unicorn Games. However, the Decipher game system is dissimilar to the one that Last Unicorn published. Instead, the system is similar to Wizards of the Coast's d20 System but uses 2D6 to resolve actions.

== Materials ==
Books released for the game include:

- Book 1: Star Trek Roleplaying Game: Player's Guide (2002) - The bookcover, illustrated by Kieran Yanner, shows the various notable starship captains (see image at right).
- Book 2: Star Trek Roleplaying Game Narrator's Guide (2002)
- Book 3: Starfleet Operations Manual (2003)
- Book 4: Starships (2003)
- Book 5: Aliens (2003)
- Book 6: Creatures (2003)
- Supplement: Star Trek Narrator's Screen (2003)
- Worlds (PDF only, 2005)
- Mirror Universe: Through a Glass Darkly (PDF only, 2005)
