= The Lord of the Rings Roleplaying Game =

Tabletop game

- Designers: Steven S. Long, Christian Moore, Owen M. Seyler, Ross Isaacs
- Publishers: Decipher Inc.
- Publication: 2002-2006
- Genres: Fantasy
- Systems: Coda System

The Lord of the Rings Roleplaying Game, released by Decipher, Inc. in 2002, is a tabletop role-playing game set in the fictional world of Middle-earth created by J. R. R. Tolkien. The game is set in the years between The Hobbit and The Fellowship of the Ring, but may be run at any time from the First to Fourth Age and contains many examples of how to do so. Sourcebooks cover the events of The Lord of the Rings and Peter Jackson's film trilogy adaptation.

The system for LOTR is called CODA, and involves rolling two six-sided dice to resolve actions.

Decipher had published The Lord of the Rings Roleplaying Adventure Game in 2001, which is an introductory game based on the rules of this game.

== Races ==
The character races available in the Lord of the Rings Roleplaying Game are:

- Dwarves (Khazad): Short, stocky bearded folk, strong and hardy, able to endure pain, fatigue and suffering better than other races. Upon reaching maturity they appear old in a fashion that belies their hardiness. They often live in subterranean kingdoms, and have a great love of craftworks, especially things made of gold, silver, and mithril.
- Elves (Eldar): The oldest and wisest of races of Middle-earth, they are immortal, noble, and fair. Their kind have far clearer sight and perception than Men, and they're nimble. They are naturally aware of many things that are hidden from the Younger Children. They are divided into a number of particular kinds, primarily based on their course through Elven history. The Noldor or High Elves are those that heeded the call of the Valar and traveled across the sea, most of them later rebelling and following Fëanor back to Middle-earth in pursuit of the Silmarils. They are wise in Lore and Smithcraft, and created many Rings of Power. The Sindar or Grey Elves are those that heard the call, but stopped and chose to stay in Beleriand. These are the more numerous kind of elf in the Third Age, and have great love of, and talent with, music and song. The Silvan Elves or Wood Elves are those that ceased their journey to the West before crossing the Misty Mountains. During the Third age, they live in woodland realms such as Lothlórien or caverns in the mountains of Mirkwood. They have facility with wilderness skills.
- Hobbits: The signature race of Tolkien, these diminutive people are a distant relation to men. They are good-natured, hospitable and easy going folk, two to four feet in height with hair covered feet. There are three major strains of Hobbits: Fallohides, taller, slimmer, fairer, and more uncommon than their fellows, they often have more facility with language, song, and craft, and have an unusual adventurous streak. Harfoots are the most numerous kind, and tend to be shorter and browner than others. They are nimble with crafts, more friendly with Dwarves, and tend to stick to the custom of living in holes and tunnels. The Stoors are broader and sturdier and most numerous in Buckland. These are the only Hobbits who know anything about boating, swimming and fishing.
- Men: The most familiar character race, these still come in several varieties available for player characters. Dúnedain are descendants of the Númenóreans, themselves descendant of Elros Tar-Minyatur, twin brother of Elrond Halfelven. The Men of Twilight, including the Rohirrim, the Beornings, Dunlendings and the majority of Gondorians (due to centuries of interbreeding), are men who did not go to Númenor but remained in Middle-earth. These are typical Men. The Men of Darkness are the Easterlings, the Haradrim (Southrons), and Variags of Khand, most of whom have lived under the sway of Sauron. They are shorter, broader, darker of hair and eye, and duskier. Finally, there are Wild Men, who are short and squat and live rudely in the wild, though they carry their own nobility and powers. These include the Drúedain (Woses) who live in the forest of Anórien and the Lossoth (Snowmen of Forochel) who live in the Northern Waste.

== Classes ==
The character classes available in the Lord of the Rings Roleplaying Adventure Game are:

- Barbarian: A warrior of the wilds who may lack some of the refined skills and weapons of other fighting men, but who make up for it with woodcraftiness and ferocity. Ghân-buri-Ghân and his people the Drúedain belong to this order, as well as many Dunlendings and easterlings
- Craftsman: A person skilled in the arts of making, able to craft items both useful and wondrous, or who serves others in some ordinary capacity. Sam Gamgee, Barliman Butterbur, many Dwarves, and the Noldorin jewelsmiths, such as Fëanor, are all craftsmen.
- Lore-master: One wise in the lore of Middle-earth and who, though not a true caster of spells, can use some minor or subtle magics. Denethor, Elrond, Celeborn, and many Elves are lore-masters.
- Magician: One who works magic and casts spells based on learned lore and wisdom but who is not nearly as powerful as a wizard. Galadriel is a good example of a magician, as is Melian the Maia, Queen of Doriath and the consort of the elven King Elu Thingol from The Silmarillion.
- Mariner: A sailor, one who knows how to work and helm ships great and small over the wide seas and on the Great River. Coastal Gondorians and the Corsairs of Umbar count many mariners among their number.
- Minstrel: A singer of songs, teller of tales, and a chronicler of brave and noble deeds. With his words and music, he can inspire others. An example is King Theoden's minstrel, Gleowine who wrote the funeral song which the Riders of Rohan sang around Theoden's mound. Tom Bombadil, a mysterious character not only known for his love of song and dance, could likely be considered a member of this order.
- Noble: A person who, due to birth, wealth, accomplishment, or the like, is regarded as of high rank in society, entitled to deference and respect from other folk. Characters such as Aragorn, Galadriel, Denethor and his sons, Elrond and his daughter Arwen, the Rohirrim Royal Family, and even Frodo belong, at least in part, to this order.
- Rogue: A person who lives and works with his wits and deft hands, often at questionable or outlawed pursuits. He may be a spy for the Enemy, a professional treasure seeker, or simply one who prefers subtlety and guile to warfare and bloodshed. Bilbo, during his brief adventure with Thorin and company, became a member of this order. Gríma Wormtongue is also a rogue, as are the thugs hired by Saruman who raided the Hobbit Shire.
- Warrior: People, such as guardsmen, soldiers, and archers, who are trained to fight with weapons. This is the most common order depicted in The Lord of the Rings, and it may likely be so in most chronicles as well. It includes Aragorn, Boromir, Éomer, Éowyn, most Rohirrim, Beregond, Prince Imrahil, and eventually, Merry and Pippin.

== Publications ==
=== Printed ===
The following printed publications have been released by Decipher for this roleplaying game.

Title	Date	Pages	ISBN
Core Book	August 2002	304	ISBN 978-1-582369518
The Fellowship of the Ring Sourcebook	May 2003	128	ISBN 978-1-582369556
The Two Towers Sourcebook	August 2003	128	ISBN 978-1-582369594
Fell Beasts and Wondrous Magic	April 2003	96	ISBN 978-1-58236-956-3
Narrator's Screen	February 2003	16	ISBN 978-1-58236-953-2
Hero's Journal	April 2003	48	ISBN 978-1-58236-954-9
Maps of Middle-Earth	November 2002	32 + 6 maps	ISBN 978-1-58236-960-0
Helm's Deep	2005	96	ISBN 978-1-58236-961-7

=== Digital sourcebooks ===
- Isengard
- Paths of the Wise. The Guide to Magicians and Loremasters

=== Digital adventures ===
The following adventures were available for free download on the website of Decipher.

Title	Author
Quick-Start Adventure. The Road to Henneth Annûn	Douglas Sun
The House of Margil	

- Moria
- Adventures over the Edge of the Wild

=== Errata ===
Decipher published a PDF version of corrections to the Core Rulebook and several sourcebooks. The PDF includes some errors that were not corrected in the first and second printings of the book.

=== Unofficial Digital Supplements ===
Due to some criticism of the game by the gaming community for its lack of balance, especially during character creation, some digital supplements have been created, which can be found on the Ambarquenta website. These supplements are unofficial and are not published by Decipher.

== Reviews ==
- Envoyer #72
- Backstab #43 (as "Jeu de rôle du Seigneur des Anneaux")
- Coleção Dragão Brasil
- Realms of Fantasy

== Awards ==
- In 2003, it won the Origins Award for Best Roleplaying Game 2002.
