= Star Trek Roleplaying Game: Player's Guide =

Role-playing game supplement

- Designers: Matthew Colville; Kenneth Hite; Ross S. Isaacs; Steven S. Long; Don Mappin; Christian Moore; Owen Seyler
- Illustrators: Kieran Yanner
- Publishers: Decipher, Inc.
- Publication: 2002
- Genres: Star Trek

Star Trek Roleplaying Game: Player's Guide is a supplement published by Decipher, Inc. in 2002 for Star Trek Roleplaying Game.

== Contents ==
Star Trek Roleplaying Game: Player's Guide spans 13 chapters that contain rules for a new game system called CODA, as well as the information players need to create characters to play in this setting:

1. A summary of the history of the 35 years (at that point) of the Star Trek universe as expressed through the franchise from the original series to Voyager.
2. The various species that can be used for player characters are outlined, including Bajoran, Betazoid, Cardassian, Ferengi, Human, Klingon, Ocampa, Talaxian, Trill, and Vulcan.
3. Professions that can be played: Diplomat, merchant, mystic, rogue, scientist, soldier, and starship officer. Each profession is described fully, with three tiers of proficiency.
4. Attribute scores: Strength, Intellect, Agility, Vitality, Presence, and Perception.
5. Edges and Flaws: At each stage of generation, a character can select an edge (positive ability or skill) in return for receiving a flaw.
6. Skills
7. Traits
8. Characteristics
9. Character advancement: Each 1000 experience points leads to a new level and the opportunity to purchase five advancement choices. If a character meets certain qualifications, they may select an elite profession including Adept, Ambassador, Assassin, Envoy, Explorer, Free Trader, Inventor, Mercenary, Smuggler, Spy, or Weaponmaster.
10. Equipment, both for 23rd- and 24th-century campaigns.
11. Adventuring in the Star Trek galaxy
12. Adventuring in the Federation
13. Adventuring at various time points and places in the Star Trek franchise.

An appendix covers personal combat rules. A blank character sheet is included, but several reviewers noted the difficulty of photocopying the sheet, since it was done in pale pastel colors.

== Publication history ==
The first license for a Star Trek role-playing game was granted in 1978 to Heritage Models, who produced Star Trek: Adventure Gaming in the Final Frontier. This was followed by licensed RPGs by Terra Games (1982), FASA (1982), Amarillo Design Bureau (1993), Franz Games (1995), and Last Unicorn Games (1998). In 2002, Decipher Inc. absorbed Last Unicorn, and as Shannon Appelcline noted, "The old Last Unicorn crew created a totally new gaming system for Decipher and released it in a single Star Trek Roleplaying Game Player's Guide (2002) that covered all the various eras." The 256-page book was designed by Matthew Colville, Kenneth Hite, Ross S. Isaacs, Steven S. Long, Don Mappin, Christian Moore, and Owen Seyler, and was illustrated by Kieran Yanner.

== Reception ==
In Issue 4 of D20Zine, Steven Creech noted, "One of the real strengths to this version of the game that other publishers have failed to do in the past is provide a way to pick any Star Trek setting or time period to play in. If you like the original series the best, it's not a problem to run scenarios there. If you want to have second or third generation characters, they can adventure in current [2002] Starfleet time period and fight in the Dominion Wars." Creech concluded, "In my opinion, it is a true hit. Anyone who is a Star Trek fan and has dreamed of playing in that universe has perhaps the best system done yet at his fingertips ... a simple, easy to use game system that allows you to focus on creating your worlds and not spend so much time on looking up rules."

Matthew Pook, writing for Pyramid, pointed out that some players felt the inclusion of the Ocampa and Talaxians was too specific to the far-distant Delta Quadrant, and that the game should have included other races found in the Alpha and Beta Quadrants such as the Andorians and the Tellarites. But as Pook noted, " the Decipher version of the Star Trek RPG is trying to cover all four [TV] series, [so] the Ocampa and the Talaxians are included with good reason." Pook liked the look of the book, calling it "very nicely laid out and liberally illustrated." Pook concluded, "Despite the poor organization and explanation of character creation — which certainly becomes easier with practice — the Player's Guide is a useful box of tools for running a game during any of the Star Trek time periods."

In Issue 267 of Science Fiction Weekly, Eric T. Baker noted "Two problems plague ST role-playing games: Who gets to be the captain and what to do about phasers?" Baker pointed out that this game allowed for civilian characters, thus possibly moving away from the need to have a captain in charge. Baker also noted that phasers could be a problems, writing, "Phasers are treated faithfully to the source material. They can stun people and heat rocks and clear debris. They can also kill people. Instantly. This is obviously a problem if a player character happens to get in the way of a power 8 blast. In the shows, most phaser blasts miss, and that is how it works in the game, too." Baker concluded, "My personal bias is for more freeform play than the 'a skill for everything and everything has a skill' style that the Star Trek Role-Playing Game: Player's Guide is written in, but that is just taste. The game is complete and faithful and that is what is most important in a licensed game."

In Issue 39 of the French games magazine Backstab, Michaël Croituru noted, "The Player's Guide immediately avoids one of the main flaws of previous editions: players are no longer restricted to playing Starfleet officers; characters can now be Ferengi merchants, Cardassian diplomats, or members of the Maquis." Croituru concluded, "I don't have enough space here to fully express how highly I rate this game, despite the character sheet being difficult to photocopy and the inability to play a Romulan."

== Other reviews and commentary ==
- Legions Realm Monthly (Issue 13 - Oct 2003)
- Anduin (Issue 80 - Feb 2003)
