= Dragon Quest (disambiguation) =

Dragon Quest is a Japanese role-playing games franchise by Yuji Horii.

Dragon Quest, DragonQuest or others may also refer to:

== Dragon Quest franchise ==
- Dragon Quest (video game), the first game in the series, originally known as Dragon Warrior in North America
- Dragon Quest (TV series), also known as Dragon Warrior, a 1989 Japanese anime based on the video game series
- Dragon Quest (manga series), a Japanese manga based on the video game series
  - Dragon Quest: The Adventure of Dai (1991 TV series), An anime adaptation of the 1991 manga of the same name
  - Dragon Quest: The Adventure of Dai (2020 TV series), An anime adaptation of the 2002 manga of the same name
- Dragon Quest: Your Story, a 2019 animated feature-length film

== Other ==
- Dragon Quest (My Little Pony: Friendship Is Magic), an episode of the 2010 Canadian-American animated TV series My Little Pony: Friendship is Magic
- DragonQuest, a fantasy role-playing game
- Dragonquest, a 1970 fantasy novel by Anne McCaffrey
- Dragon-Quest Adventure, a 1980 video game for the TRS-80, also known as Dragonquest!
- Dragon Quest (TSR), a 1992 fantasy miniature game published by TSR, Inc.
- Dragon Quest (film), a 2023 short comedy film produced by Jeremiah Blackman
- Dragonquest (film), a 2009 fantasy film produced by The Asylum
