= Karl Waller =

American artist

Karl Waller is an American artist whose work has appeared in comic books and roleplaying and collectible card games.

== Early life and education ==
He graduated from the Pennsylvania School of Art in 1987, with a diploma in communication arts.

== Career ==
Karl Waller produced interior illustrations for many Dungeons & Dragons books and Dragon magazine from 1988 to 1998.

He has also produced artwork for other role-playing games including Shadowrun and Earthdawn (FASA), Shatterzone, Torg, and Bloodshadows (West End Games), Aria: Canticle of the Monomyth (Last Unicorn Games), and In Nomine and GURPS (Steve Jackson Games), Vampire: The Masquerade and Wraith: The Oblivion (White Wolf), and Mutants & Masterminds (Green Ronin Publishing).

Waller has also illustrated cards for Last Unicorn Games' collectible card game Heresy: Kingdom Come.

Waller has also worked in the comic book industry, including illustrating the prequel comic book X-Men the Movie: Wolverine.
