= Bernie Cahill =

American talent manager

- Born: Bernard Cahill
- Occupations: Talent manager, brand manager, entertainment lawyer
- Employer: Activist Artist Management
- Spouse: Jaime Murray (m. 2014)
- Website: http://activist.co/

Bernard Cahill is an American talent manager, brand manager, and entertainment lawyer. Previously a co-founder of the talent and brand-management company ROAR, he became a founding partner of Activist Artists Management, a full-service talent management, integrated media, and advisory firm based in West Hollywood, California, in 2018.

== Career ==
In 1994, Bernie Cahill co-founded Last Unicorn Games with Christian Moore, Owen Seyler, and Greg Ormand. Cahill served as the company's CEO. Cahill secured a license based on David Lynch's 1984 Dune film in 1996; this led Brian Herbert to grant Last Unicorn Games a license to the Dune novels later that year. In 2000, Cahill sold Last Unicorn Games to hobby games publisher Wizards of the Coast, a subsidiary of Hasbro.

In 2004, Cahill and his partners Greg Suess, Jay Froberg, and Will Ward, founded the integrated management company ROAR, LLC. Since then, ROAR has grown to 42 employees and has offices in New York, Atlanta, and Nashville, with its headquarters in Beverly Hills, California.

Cahill established ROAR's music division and managed artists such as three-time Grammy Award-winning Zac Brown Band, Grammy Award-winning musician and actor Dwight Yoakam, legendary rock band Grateful Dead, singer-songwriter Ben Rector, actor and recording artist Clare Bowen, Grammy-nominated electronic music producer Morgan Page, and renowned world artist Gaelic Storm. Cahill and ROAR partner Will Ward worked closely with JAM and Outback Concerts to produce Zac Brown’s Southern Ground Music and Food Festivals.

In 2009, ROAR acquired Jennie Smythe's Nashville-based digital marketing firm, Girlilla Marketing.

Cahill also served as a key member of the company’s talent management team, co-managing a talent roster that includes Chris Hemsworth, Liam Hemsworth, David Alan Grier, Aisha Tyler, Cobie Smulders, and Ken Watanabe, among others.

Formerly an intellectual property attorney prior to co-founding ROAR, Cahill ran a law office on Nashville's Music Row specializing in artist representation, licensing, and digital rights management. Cahill is a member of the National Academy of Recording Arts and Sciences, Academy of Country Music, Americana Music Association, Country Music Association, and Country Music Association International Voting Panel. Cahill currently serves as a board member of Genius Brands International. He is also actively involved in philanthropic causes, including Zac Brown’s Camp Southern Ground and the USO Entertainment Advisory Council, as well as serving on the board of InsideOUT Writers. Cahill was previously a member of the Illinois State Bar Association and the Tennessee Bar Association.

In April 2018, Bernie Cahill and Greg Suess left the company, along with the head of ROAR’s Nashville office, Matt Maher, and head of media and brand strategy, Liz Norris, to launch Activist Artist Management, a full-service talent management, integrated media, and advisory firm with 23 associates across offices in Los Angeles, New York, Nashville, and Atlanta. Cahill now runs Activist’s music and talent divisions, having brought many clients with him to the new company.

In 2017, Cahill landed on Billboard's Power 100 list, namely for the launch of Dead & Company, breaking stadium attendance records with Zac Brown Band, and completing a catalog and intellectual property deal for the Grateful Dead, among much more. He has also been featured on the Billboard “Nashville/ Country Power Players” list.

== Personal life ==
Cahill previously dated Sharon Stone. Cahill married actress Jaime Murray in Bali in May 2014.
