= Star Trek: The Next Generation Narrator's Toolkit =

RPG game supplement published in 1998

Star Trek: The Next Generation Narrator's Toolkit is a supplement published by Last Unicorn Games (LUG) in 1998 for the science fiction role-playing game Star Trek: The Next Generation Role-playing Game, itself based on the Star Trek franchise.

== Contents ==
Star Trek: The Next Generation Narrator's Toolkit contains a three-panel gamemaster's screen. The side facing the Narrator (gamemaster) contains useful tables. The side facing the players displays a number of photographs from the Star Trek: The Next Generation TV series. A 64-page booklet packaged with the screen contains useful advice and tips for the Narrator on how to run campaigns. A short scenario based on the ST:NG episode "Hide and Q" is also included in the booklet.

== Publication history ==
Although the Next Generation television series aired in 1987, it was not until 1998 that a role-playing game appeared after LUG acquired the license. Almost a dozen supplements quickly followed the same year, one of them being Narrator's Toolkit, which was designed by Kenneth Hite, with illustrations by Anthony Vayos.

== Reception ==
Narrator's Toolkit was reviewed in the online second version of Pyramid which said "Within this tome are the most useful instructions on how to run a role playing game that I have ever seen set to paper. And it's also useful to anyone running a Star Trek: The Next Generation RPG session."

In Issue 12 of the French games magazine Backstab, Léonidas Vesperini thought this package was a step down in quality from the previously published core rulebook, writing, "This is undoubtedly an editorial choice to achieve an affordable price, but we expected better. For example, the screen is only three panels, not particularly sturdy, and illustrated with small photos on a barely retouched black background. The booklet, meanwhile, isn't in full color like the game, but in black and white, even though the photos are still plentiful." Vesperini also didn't like the included scenario, calling it "simply an adaptation of ... "Hide and Q," which most fans already know (and which therefore becomes unusable)." Vesperini added a positive note, calling the advice to the Narrator "truly interesting and enjoyable to read. Far from the 'bogus' recommendations one might expect, it instead provides sound advice and highlights the pitfalls to avoid when mastering a part of Star Trek." Vesperini concluded by giving this supplement a rating of 6 out of 10, saying, "In short, a screen less flashy than the core rulebook, but one that fulfills its purpose very well."

Dragon commented, "Packed with storytelling hints and design tricks, the Narrator’s Toolkit gives you all the tools you need to create adventures in the final frontier, including expanded sections on story and episode design, and tips for running your own ongoing Star Trek: The Next Generation RPG series."
