= Star Trek Roleplaying Game (Last Unicorn Games) =

Tabletop role-playing game

Star Trek Role-playing Game
- Designers: Christian Moore, Ross Isaacs, Kenneth Hite, Steven S. Long
- Publishers: Last Unicorn Games
- Publication: 1998 (Next Generation); 1999 (Deep Space Nine and Original Series)
- Genres: Science fiction
- Systems: Icon system

Star Trek Role-playing Game is a line of role-playing games set in the fictional Star Trek universe and published by Last Unicorn Games (LUG). Three games were released: Star Trek: The Next Generation Role-playing Game in 1998, Star Trek: Deep Space Nine Role Playing Game and Star Trek Role Playing Game both in 1999.

== Development ==
Due to licensing issues, LUG did not release the game as a single core rulebook and setting supplements for the various series but instead intended to release a corebook for every series. The Star Trek license was lost to Decipher before a Star Trek: Voyager rulebook could be released.

Steven S. Long and Kenneth Hite joined in the developers working for Last Unicorn Games on the "Icon system" for their line of licensed Star Trek role-playing games; to get The Next Generation Role-playing Game ready for GenCon 31, they were flown out to Los Angeles for two weeks. After the design of Icon was done, Long was made the line developer for the Star Trek: Deep Space 9 role-playing game.

== The Next Generation (TNG) ==
The Next Generation Role-playing Game was released in 1998. It is based on Star Trek: The Next Generation.

== Deep Space Nine (DS9) ==
The Deep Space Nine Role Playing Game was released in 1999. It is based on Star Trek: Deep Space Nine.

=== Publications ===
- 35000 - Star Trek: Deep Space Nine Role-playing Game (hardcover)
- 35001 - DS9 Narrator's Toolkit (book & screen)
- 35100 - Raiders, Renegades & Rogues

== The Original Series (TOS) ==
The Star Trek Role Playing Game was released in 1999. It is based on Star Trek: The Original Series.

=== Publications ===
- 45000 - Star Trek: The Original Series Role-playing Game (hardcover)
- 45001 - TOS Narrator's Toolkit (book & screen)
- 45101 - Among the Clans: The Andorians

== Other published materials ==
=== The Expanded Universe (Non-specific setting) ===
- 15002 - All Our Yesterdays: The Time Travel Sourcebook

=== Miniatures ===
- 25600 - Federation Away Team Miniatures (Boxed set containing 7 miniatures)

=== Web enhancements ===
Last Unicorn Games was one of the first roleplaying companies to use the concept of releasing additional pages for published books via the web. LUG dubbed these "Icon Links," in reference to their overall "Icon System" game mechanics (the term Web Enhancement hadn't been invented yet). Unlike current web enhancements, which are simply additions that can be added to the end of a book, LUG took a unique approach, by planning the enhancements ahead of time, and printing a small Icon symbol at various points in a given book, informing the reader that additional material on the subject-at-hand was available on the company's website to read or download and print. These enhancements are now being stored online, and can be downloaded from Memory Icon, under the Icon Links section.

=== Unpublished materials ===
Many additional books and supplements were planned, and quite a few had various chapters already written in varying degrees of completion when the product line was cancelled. LUG's former pool of writers has been very supportive of the fan movement to expand and continue playing the game. In support of this, much of the unpublished material has been released on the internet.
