= Space Battle (video game) =

1978 video game

- Developer(s): Level IV
- Publisher(s): The Software Exchange
- Designer(s): Rick Papo
- Platform(s): TRS-80
- Release: 1978
- Genre(s): Strategy

Space Battle (also known as Space Battles) is a 1978 video game developed by Level IV for the TRS-80 16K Level II microcomputer.

== Gameplay ==
Space Battle is a Star Trek-style game, in which the player take the role of a mercenary ship engaged in combat with hostile alien ships.

== Reception ==
In 80-US, Geo Blank compared the game to Time Trek, and rated its content "Excellent" and its value "Good to very good", concluding that it was "One of the best space war games available." J. Mishcon reviewed Space Battle in The Space Gamer No. 28, commenting that "I believe most gamer will set this aside - a nice try, but not really a challenge. The tactics are just too easily optimized." In Moves, the game was criticised for not holding long-term interest compared to other similar games.
