= Dune (card game) =

Collectible card game

Eye of the Storm
- Cardback of the Dune CCG
- Designers: Owen Seyler; Matthew Colville
- Publishers: Five Rings Publishing Group; Wizards of the Coast
- Players: 2–8
- Playing time: ~ 1 hour
- Chance: Some
- Skills: Card playing; Arithmetic; Basic reading ability

Dune is an out-of-print collectible card game produced by Last Unicorn Games and Five Rings Publishing Group, and later Wizards of the Coast. Set in the Dune universe based on the books written by Frank Herbert, the game pits two or more players against each other, each in control of a minor house vying for entry in the Landsraad.

== Publishing history ==
Originally released in 1997 as Dune: Eye of the Storm by a partnership of Five Rings Publishing Group (FRPG) and Last Unicorn Games. The license negotiated with the Herbert Estate and Universal Studios was for intellectual property based on the 1984 film Dune directed by David Lynch. By December 1997, the license covered all of the Dune novels by Frank Herbert, and the game was based on the first three novels (Dune, Dune Messiah, and Children of Dune).

It was designed by Owen Seyler, and featured painted card art instead of screen captures from the film. The set included 301 cards available in 60-card starter decks and 15-card booster packs. There were six starter decks, one for each of the political factions in the game, half of which were fixed for the deck and the other half randomized.

Although Ally and Homeworld cards were only available in starter boxes, not all Ally cards were included in a given starter (e.g. Piter de Vries, Liscia Theirese), giving rise to the collectable/tradable game element. A small number of promotional cards were also released to people requesting additional information about the game prior to Eye of the Storm's initial release. All of these cards have "Preview" on the left-hand side of the card face.

FRPG intended on releasing expansion sets quarterly. The first one, the 152-card set Judge of the Change, was released in December 1997. It was sold in 60-card half-fixed starter decks and 15-card booster packs. The set added the factions 'Spice Miners Guild' and 'Water Peddlers Union' and the type 'decrees'.

When Wizards of the Coast purchased Five Rings later that year, Dune underwent a major shift. In a program called Rolling Thunder, small expansions of the game, called "Chapters", were released every two months. While intended to keep the pace of collecting exciting, it resulted in high duplicate rates in booster packs and a competitive landscape constantly in flux.

In 1998, Wizards of the Coast released two more complete sets, Dune: Judge of the Change (183 cards, covering the arrival of House Atreides on Arrakis) and Dune: Thunder at Twilight (178 cards, covering the reclaiming of Arrakis by House Harkonnen), but the challenging gameplay proved too difficult for younger players. This ultimately led to the collapse of the Dune CCG.

Two more expansions, Dune: Second Moon Rising (the rise of Paul Atreides) and Dune: Fall of the Padishah (the defeat of Padishah Emperor Shaddam IV), were planned for release in 1998. However, the game was canceled before they were printed.

== Gameplay ==
Players take the role of minor houses vying for entry into the Landsraad. They are sponsored in this effort by one of six Great Houses/Factions (House Atreides, Bene Gesserit Sisterhood, House Corrino, the Fremen, House Harkonnen, and the Spacing Guild), and must choose one Homeworld, as well as a number of unique Allies and Holdings to make up their Imperial Deck. Players also have a House Deck containing non-unique cards that represent their Aides, Personnel, Equipment, Plans and Tactics (random Event cards may also be included in the House Deck).

The Judge of the Change expansion introduced three new Factions (the Spice Miner's Guild, the Water Seller's Union, and the Dune Smugglers), and the Thunder at Twilight expansion contained modified House Atreides, House Corrino and House Harkonnen starter sets (reflecting the period in the Dune novel when House Atreides took possession of Arrakis from the Harkonnen). Thunder at Twilight also added the 'program ventures' and 'nexus events' card types.

Each player begins the game with a homeworld and small amount of solaris, the currency of the Imperium. Players compete over Imperial Deck Allies and Holdings through an auction-style mechanic, while House Deck resources are paid for and deployed from a player's hand.

Players attack one another through Intrigue, Battle, Arbitration, and Dueling Rites to gain political standing and wealth. Allies and Aides can only participate in a particular Rite if they have the Talent for it (displayed on their card). When a player uses a deployed Ally or Aide to attack or defend, they must Tap that card and it cannot be used again until the next turn. This may leave the player open to an attack from another player, so it becomes important to have multiple elements of attack and defense deployed at all times. Also, Tactic cards make it possible for one player to interfere with an attack occurring between two other players and influence the outcome without using any of the interfering player's Allies or Aides. Allies and Aides that are defeated in an attack are usually not removed from play but are turned face down, and may be resurrected after a few turns.

The mystical elements of Prophecy and Bene Gesserit Weirding ways can also be utilized to significantly further one's agenda. Victory can be gained once a player's House accumulates 10 or more spice units and 10 or more Favor points.

== Reviews ==
- Syfy
