= STIII =

STIII may refer to:

- Star Trek III: The Search for Spock (1984 film) third film in the original Star Trek film series
- Star Trek Beyond (2016 film) third film in the J.J.Abrams reboot Star Trek film series
- Starship Troopers 3: Marauder (2008 film) third film in the Starship Troopers film series
- Star Trek III Combat Simulator (1984 game) FASA tabletop board wargame, see Star Trek: Starship Tactical Combat Simulator

== See also ==
- ST3 (disambiguation)
