= Aliens (Star Trek Roleplaying Game) =

Role-playing game supplement

- Designers: Bill Bridges; Andrew C. Greenberg; Kenneth Hite; Ross A. Isaacs; Douglas Sun
- Illustrators: Jesse Kassem
- Publishers: Decipher, Inc.
- Publication: 2003
- Genres: Star Trek

Aliens is a supplement published by Decipher, Inc. in 2003 for Star Trek Roleplaying Game.

== Contents ==
Aliens is a collection of 58 of the alien races used in the five Star Trek television series and the movies produced up to 2002, from the original series to Star Trek: Voyager. The book begins with an overview of alien races and how they are used in Star Trek. The ones deemed to be the easiest to use as player characters with little or no adjustment are clearly marked with an asterisk.

A section about "Alien Upbringing" explains the rules for a player character of one race that is brought up by parents of another race.

Each of the 58 races is then examined in detail, with sections for Personality, Physiology And Appearance, Homeworld, History And Culture, Language And Names, Favored Professions, Species Adjustments, and Species Abilities. A sample non-player character is provided. Finally, the role of the race in each of the television series is outlined.

== Publication history ==
The first license for a Star Trek role-playing game was granted in 1978 to Heritage Models, who produced Star Trek: Adventure Gaming in the Final Frontier. This was followed by licensed RPGs by Terra Games (1982), FASA (1982), Amarillo Design Bureau (1993), Franz Games (1995), and Last Unicorn Games (1998). In 2002, Decipher Inc. absorbed Last Unicorn, and produced Star Trek Roleplaying Game. This was followed in 2003 by the supplement Aliens, a 178-page hardcover book designed by Bill Bridges, Andrew C. Greenberg, Kenneth Hite, Ross A. Isaacs, and Douglas Sun, and illustrated by Jesse Kassem.

== Reception ==
Matthew Pook, writing for Pyramid, called it, "clean, tidy, and easy to read, though sparsely illustrated with photographs taken from all five series and the movies." Pook noted, "With so many different races within its covers, how useful the Star Trek gamemaster will find this supplement to be will vary greatly. Much of this will depend upon their campaign and the species that they want to use within own series." Pook pointed out, "many of the races in Aliens should prove themselves very welcome additions to the Star Trek Roleplaying Game." Pook concluded, "Aliens is a very useful and handy resource for any Star Trek campaign and is probably the most useful of books so far released by Decipher. "

In Issue 45 of the French games magazine Backstab, Michaël Croituru noted, "Players now have the opportunity to step into the roles of Federation members (or enemies) for a single episode or an entire campaign." Croituru concluded by calling this book, "A presentation that is clear, concise, and flawless."
