= CODA System =

Role-playing game system

The CODA System is a role-playing game system designed by Decipher, Inc.

== Description ==
After Last Unicorn Games was purchased by Wizards of the Coast, some of the staff left and started working for Decipher, Inc. where they created Star Trek Roleplaying Game, which used the CODA System. The CODA System was also used, in an altered form, in their Lord of the Rings Roleplaying Game. It was published in two 256-page hardcover books.

It uses six-sided dice to resolve actions. It uses a set of character statistics, as well as skills and edges, that function similarly to the d20 System 'Feats' systems. Characters belong to a class, and can adopt more than one class as they progress.

The CODA System has characters advancing and refers to characters as having N advancements, similar to having a particular level in the d20 System. Advancing gives the player a number of picks with which to buy upgrades to their character's statistics and abilities.

Characters have a total hit point pool segmented into health levels; each health level of damage incurred imposes a wound penalty to certain actions. Characters also have a number of 'weariness' levels; extended or intense activity can result in penalties to certain actions based on the number of weariness levels lost.

== Reception ==
In Issue 87 of the Brazilian role-playing magazine Coleção Dragão Brasil, Rogério Saladino noted that "the old MERP, Middle Earth Role Playing, was famous for its overly complicated rules and tables and never became popular." But Saladino was confident that the new Lord of the Rings game published by Decipher would fare better, pointing out that the new CODA System being used for the game was "more agile."

In Issue 2 of the Russian game magazine Навигатор игрового мира (Game World Navigator), Petr Tyulenev (Петр Тюленев) also commented on the new Lord of the Rings game, noting that the CODA System used in it was not new, having previously been used in Decipher's Star Trek game, "but for The Lord of the Rings it was seriously reworked and supplemented. Looking ahead, I will note that the updated Coda System took a lot of good from most of the game systems known to me, including D&D, Star Wars, Alternity, Ars Magica — and the result was no worse than any of these games." Because of this, Tyulenev concluded, "Lord of the Rings RPG deserves, in my opinion, the closest attention of players and gamemasters."
