= Time Trek =

1978 video game

- Developer(s): Connan Enterprises
- Publisher(s): Personal Software
- Programmer(s): Joshua Lavinsky (TRS); Brad Templeton (PET)
- Platform(s): TRS-80 (1978); PET(1978)
- Release: 1978

Time Trek is a Star Trek computer game published by Personal Software in 1978. Two similar but unrelated games were published under this brand in 1978, one for the Commodore PET by Brad Templeton and one programmed by Joshua Lavinsky for the TRS-80 4K Level I or Level II microcomputer.

== Plot summary ==
Time Trek is a real-time Star Trek-style game in which the Enterprise must eliminate the Klingons before they can destroy all the starbases.

== Reception ==
J. Mishcon reviewed Time Trek in The Space Gamer No. 28. Mishcon commented that "the real-time aspect of the game and the aggressive tactics of the damn Klingons make this game quite exciting. For those into hand-eye coordination and fast action, Time Trek will be enjoyable." In his 80-US review of Space Battle, "One of the best space war games available", Geo Blank compared the game to Time Trek, commenting that "The extra control makes Time Trek a better action game."
