= The Mean Checkers Machine =

1980 video game

- Developer(s): Lance Micklaus
- Publisher(s): The Software Exchange
- Platform(s): TRS-80
- Release: 1980

The Mean Checkers Machine is a 1980 video game designed by Lance Micklaus for The Software Exchange for the TRS-80 Level II Model I microcomputer.

== Plot summary ==
The Mean Checkers Machine is a computer version of checkers with four difficulty levels.

== Reception ==
J. Mishcon reviewed The Mean Checkers Machine in The Space Gamer No. 32. Mishcon commented that "A super program. If you enjoy checkers, I heartily recommend this work."

== Reviews ==
- Creative Computing
