= Westward 1847 =

1979 video game

- Publisher(s): The Software Exchange
- Designer(s): Jon C. Sherman
- Platform(s): TRS-80
- Release: 1979

Westward 1847 (also punctuated as Westward-1847) is a 1979 video game written by Jon C. Sherman published by The Software Exchange for the TRS-80 16K. It originally appeared as the cover feature for the October 1979 issue of SoftSide.

== Gameplay ==
Westward 1847 is a game in which the player has 40 weeks to get to Oregon before winter comes.

== Reception ==
Jon Mishcon reviewed Westward 1847 in The Space Gamer No. 34. Mishcon commented that "I recommend this game."
