= Invasion From Outer Space =

1980 video game

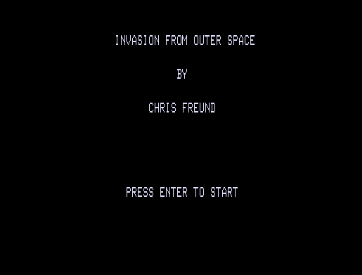
- Publisher: The Software Exchange
- Designer: Chris Freund
- Platform: TRS-80
- Release: 1980

Invasion From Outer Space is a 1980 video game designed by Chris Freund for The Software Exchange for the TRS-80 16K Level II microcomputer.

== Plot summary ==
Invasion From Outer Space is a game in which the player must blow up attacking alien ships until the aliens destroy all of the bases.

== Reception ==
Joseph T. Suchar reviewed Invasion From Outer Space (as "Alien Invaders") in The Space Gamer No. 30. Suchar commented that "This game involves no real strategy, but will provide a great deal of excitement and frustration, depending upon your temperament. If you are an arcade game fan, I highly recommend this game."
