= Begin (video game) =

1984 video game

- Developer(s): Clockwork Software
- Platform(s): MS-DOS
- Release: 1984
- Genre(s): Simulation
- Mode(s): Single-player

Begin, A Tactical Starship Simulation is a video game released for MS-DOS in 1984 and consists of combat between spaceships.

In 1991 it was followed by Begin 2. Begin 3 for Microsoft Windows was released in March 2009.

== Gameplay ==
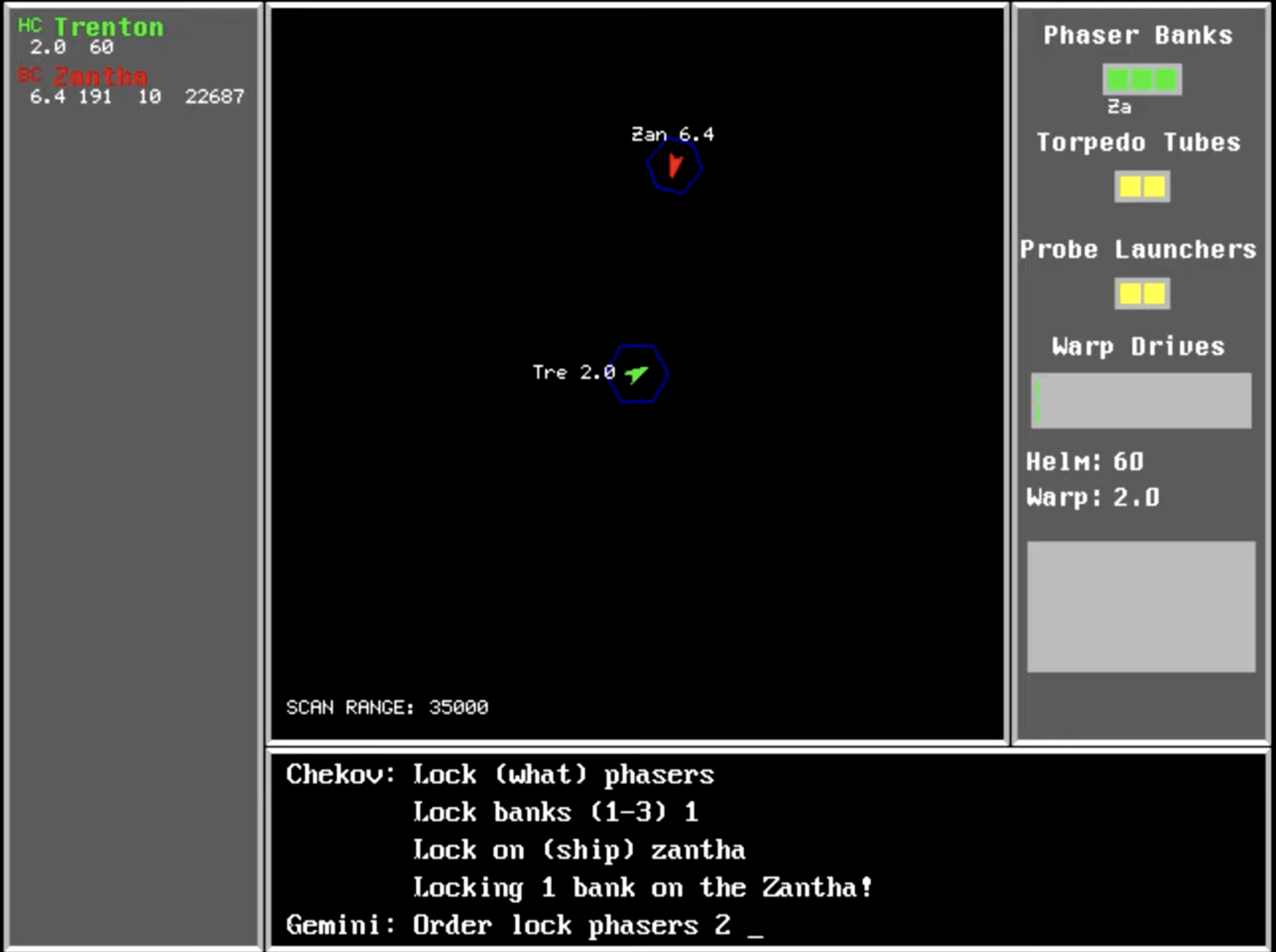
Main gameplay screen

Begin is a tactical starship simulator where the player commands a fleet of ships against an alien force.

The game is set in the Star Trek universe. Players can play as the Federation, Klingon, Romulans or Orion Pirates. Various weapons and functions are included, such as phasers, photon torpedoes and tractor beams.

== Reception ==
In 1996, Michael Feir stated that Begin 2 is "the best and most detailed simulator accessible to the blind." According to PC-SIG, the "computer strategy is quite effective."

== Legacy ==
Begin 2, released in 1991, is a tactical starship simulator game set in the Star Trek universe released in 1991. It is the sequel to Begin. The screen is similar to the one in Begin. The main difference is that the sequel featured VGA graphics whereas the original used pure ASCII screen characters (text mode). Extra ships and weapons were added as well. However, each ship is individually represented in the game, and can be individually operated and commanded by the player. Each ship has a unique set of weapons and resources. As with the first game, one of the most notable features of this game is its highly mathematical nature, and its lack of random factors.

== See also ==
- Trek73
- Star Trek games
