= The Warp Factor =

1980 video game

- Developer: Strategic Simulations
- Publisher: Strategic Simulations
- Designers: Paul Murray; Bruce D. Clayton
- Platforms: Apple II, MS-DOS
- Release: 1980: Apple II; 1982: MS-DOS
- Mode: Single-player

The Warp Factor is an Apple II video game published in 1980 by Strategic Simulations. An MS-DOS conversion was released in 1982.

== Contents ==
The Warp Factor is a game in which players can command an outpost, starbase, or starship for conducting space battles, choosing from up to 10 ships, and combatants can include the Alliance, Klargons, and Remans .

== Reception ==
Forrest Johnson reviewed The Warp Factor in The Space Gamer No. 39. Johnson commented that "The Warp Factor is a challenging game. Our machine was kept pretty busy by staffers who wanted to know, for example, how Captain Kirk would do against a swarm of Tie-fighters. It is slow, but it can keep your attention. And it is a good buy for the Star Fleet Battles addict who can't find an opponent."

The game sold 8,000 units in 1981.

== See also ==
- Star Fleet Battles
- List of Star Trek games
