= Round the Horn (video game) =

1979 video game

- Publisher: The Software Exchange
- Designer: George Blank
- Platform: TRS-80
- Release: 1979

Round the Horn (stylized with a leading apostrophe as 'Round the Horn) is a 1979 video game written by Reverend George Blank and published by The Software Exchange for the TRS-80. Written in BASIC, it was originally a type-in program—and the cover feature—in the January 1979 issue of SoftSide.

== Contents ==
Round the Horn is a game in which each player pilots a clipper ship from New York City, around South America, to San Francisco in the shortest time.

== Reception ==
Joseph Suchar reviewed Round the Horn in The Space Gamer No. 37. Suchar commented that "Round the Horn is a challenging game which is in between all of those economic games and the simplistic arcade games. I highly recommend it."
