= Lost Dutchman's Gold =

1979 video game

- Developer(s): Rider Fantasy Creations
- Publisher(s): The Software Exchange
- Designer(s): Terry Kepner
- Platform(s): TRS-80
- Release: 1979

Lost Dutchman's Gold is a 1979 video game designed by Terry Kepner (as "Teri Li") and published by The Software Exchange for the TRS-80 16K.

== Contents ==
Lost Dutchman's Gold is a text adventure in which the player searches for gold hidden in the desert.

== Reception ==
Jon Mishcon reviewed Lost Dutchman's Gold in The Space Gamer No. 34. Mishcon commented that "Overall, a good game of the adventure genre, well worth its reasonable price, but certainly not the best of its class."
