= The Lord of the Rings Roleplaying Adventure Game =

The Lord of the Rings Roleplaying Adventure Game is a 2001 role-playing game published by Decipher, Inc. It is a stand-alone introductory game based on Decipher's The Lord of the Rings Roleplaying Game.

== Gameplay ==
The Lord of the Rings Roleplaying Adventure Game is a game in which a boxed set offers a beginner-friendly adventure set during the Fellowship's journey through Moria. Players assume the roles of the nine iconic characters from the Fellowship, following a structured narrative led by a designated Narrator.

== Reviews ==
- Pyramid
- Envoyer #72
- Backstab #38
- d20Zine (Issue 2 - Oct 2002)
- Anduin (Issue 77 - Oct 2002)
- d20Zine #4 (March, 2003 PDF)
- Games Unplugged #17 (June, 2002)
- Realms of Fantasy
