= Star Trek: Bridge Crew =

2017 video game

- Developer: Red Storm Entertainment
- Publisher: Ubisoft
- Director: Brian Tate
- Producer: Robbie Edwards
- Programmer: Clark Gibson
- Artists: Andy Foltz; Megan Hobby
- Series: Star Trek
- Platforms: Microsoft Windows, Oculus Quest, PlayStation 4
- Release: Microsoft Windows, PlayStation 4; May 30, 2017; Oculus Quest; December 16, 2019
- Genre: Action-adventure
- Modes: Single-player, multiplayer

Star Trek: Bridge Crew is a virtual-reality action-adventure video game developed by Red Storm Entertainment and published by Ubisoft for Microsoft Windows, PlayStation 4, and Oculus Quest.

== Plot ==
Star Trek: Bridge Crew takes place in the timeline established in the 2009 Star Trek film and sees the Starfleet ship USS Aegis searching for a new homeworld for the Vulcans after the destruction of their planet. The ship heads for a region of space called 'The Trench', which is being occupied by Klingons.

== Gameplay ==
The game is played by up to four players, who each assume one of four roles: captain, tactical officer, engineer and helm officer. The captain is the only role to which mission objectives are directly displayed; they are responsible for communicating these to the crew and issuing orders to accomplish them. The helm officer controls the ship's course and travel between regions through impulse or warp drive. The tactical officer is in charge of sensors and weapons. The engineer manages the ship's power distribution and supervises repairs. Each role except the captain may be occupied by a human player or by an NPC indirectly controlled by the captain. Both story and randomly generated missions exist.

In December 2017, the game developers modified the game so that it can be played without a virtual-reality headset. Prior to that, the game could only be played using a headset.

== Development ==
It was developed by Red Storm Entertainment and published by Ubisoft. Series actors Karl Urban, LeVar Burton and Jeri Ryan appeared at E3 2016 to promote the game during Ubisoft's press conference. A new trailer was showcased at CES 2017. The game was released on May 30, 2017.

== Reception ==
Reception

Aggregate score
Aggregator	Score
Metacritic	(PC) 78/100 (PS4) 75/100

Review scores
Publication	Score
Destructoid	7.5/10
Game Informer	7.25/10
GameSpot	6/10
GamesRadar+	4/5
IGN	6.8/10

Star Trek: Bridge Crew received "generally positive" reviews, according to review aggregator website Metacritic. Eurogamer ranked it 42nd on their list of the "Top 50 Games of 2017", while GamesRadar+ ranked it 25th on their list of the 25 Best Games of 2017.

Many reviews compared it to Artemis: Spaceship Bridge Simulator, an indie game inspired by Star Trek, stating that Star Trek: Bridge Crew is basically "Artemis in the Star Trek universe".

In 2017, PC Gamer ranked Star Trek: Bridge Crew among the best Star Trek games.

=== Accolades ===
Year	Award	Category	Result	Ref.
2016	Game Critics Awards	Best VR Game	Nominated	
2016	Gamescom 2016	Best Virtual Reality Game	Nominated	
2017	Golden Joystick Awards	Best VR Game	Nominated	
2017	The Game Awards 2017	Best VR/AR Game	Nominated	
2018	21st Annual D.I.C.E. Awards	Immersive Reality Technical Achievement	Nominated	
2018	2018 National Academy of Video Game Trade Reviewers Awards	Control Design, VR	Nominated	
2018	2018 National Academy of Video Game Trade Reviewers Awards	Direction in Virtual Reality	Won	
2018	2018 National Academy of Video Game Trade Reviewers Awards	Sound Mixing in Virtual Reality	Nominated	
2018	2018 SXSW Gaming Awards	Excellence in Convergence	Nominated	
2018	2018 SXSW Gaming Awards	VR Game of the Year	Nominated	
2018	Game Developers Choice Awards	Best VR/AR Game	Nominated	
2018	14th British Academy Games Awards	Multiplayer	Nominated	

== See also ==
- List of Star Trek games
