= Atlantic Balloon Crossing =

1979 video game by Dean Powell

- Publisher(s): The Software Exchange
- Designer(s): Dean Powell
- Platform(s): TRS-80
- Release: WW: 1979

Atlantic Balloon Crossing is a video game written by Dean Powell for the TRS-80 and published by The Software Exchange in 1979. It was originally printed as a type-in BASIC listing in the June 1979 issue of SoftSide magazine.

== Gameplay ==
Atlantic Balloon Crossing is a game in which players control gas balloons to try to cross the Atlantic Ocean starting in Canada to reach Paris in the shortest time possible.

== Reception ==
Joseph Suchar reviewed Atlantic Balloon Crossing in The Space Gamer No. 37. Suchar commented that "I feel that this game is well worth the money. It provides a challenging multi-player or solitaire game which is difficult to optimize."
