= Artemis: Spaceship Bridge Simulator =

- Developer(s): Thom Robertson
- Programmer(s): Thom Robertson, Eric D.
- Artist(s): Matt Mitman, Dave Wellman
- Composer(s): John Robert Matz
- Platform(s): Windows, iOS
- Release: Windows; October 26, 2010; iOS; December 12, 2012
- Genre(s): Simulation
- Mode(s): Multiplayer

Artemis: Spaceship Bridge Simulator
- Developer(s): Thom Robertson
- Initial release: October 18, 2010; 14 years ago
- Stable release: 2.8.0 / December 30, 2021; 3 years ago
- Written in: C++ and DirectX 9
- Operating system: Windows 98 and newer, iOS, Android
- Website: artemisspaceshipbridge.com

Artemis: Spaceship Bridge Simulator is a multiplayer co-operative spaceship simulation game created by Thomas Robertson for Windows, iOS, and Android devices. The game is designed to be played between three and eight players over a local area network, with each player using a separate computer that provides a different spaceship bridge station, such as helm control or engineering.

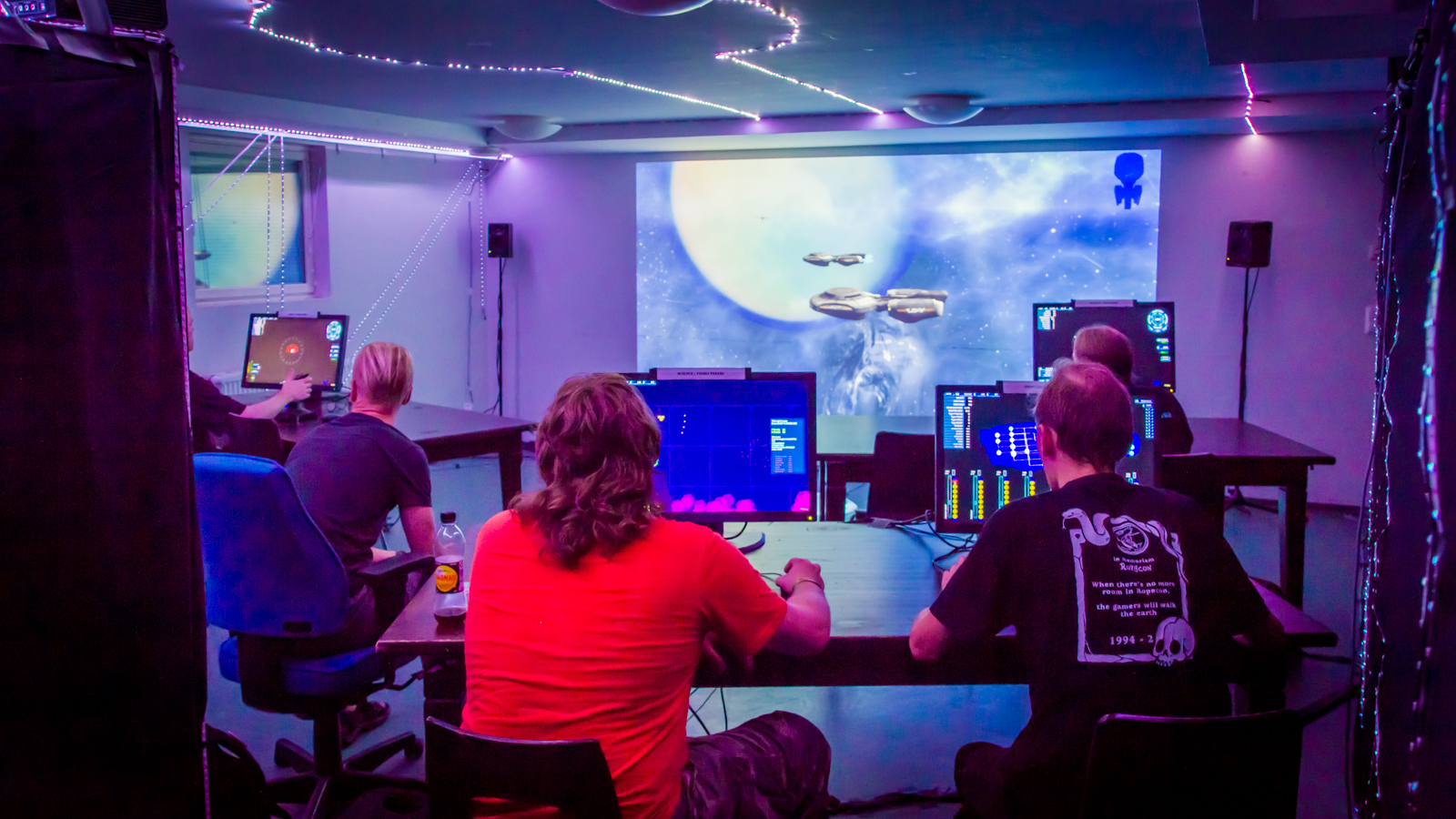
People playing Artemis at Ropecon 2014.

== Gameplay ==
=== Roles ===
Artemis uses asymmetrical gameplay in which each player takes on a role with different tasks to perform. Three roles (or "[bridge] stations") are required to play the game, setting the minimum number of players at three:

- Captain – The captain decides policy and strategy, gives commands to other stations to implement that strategy, and to some degree relays information between stations (such as bearings or shield frequencies). The captain does not have a dedicated screen and does not have any controls. One station is configured as a "main screen", visible to all players, which can display external views of the ship, short- and medium-range maps, or status screens; the view is selected by other stations, based on orders from the captain.
- Helm – The helm controls the ship's movement: turning, impulse, warp or jump drives, and docking. They are one of two stations that can control the viewscreen and the shields.
- Weapons – The weapons or tactical officer controls the ship's weapons: targeting, beams, and torpedo tubes. They are one of two stations that can control the viewscreen and the shields.

Four additional roles are optional:

- Engineering – The engineer allocates power and cooling to the ship's eight systems, and manages repair teams. Energy is a finite resource which is refilled by docking at a space station, and consumed by any system that's active. Higher power causes a system to perform faster (such as turning and moving faster, loading torpedoes faster, or making shields stronger), but also causes it to generate more heat, and cooling is also a limited resource. Damage control is done by several NPC repair teams that move through the ship and repair damaged systems. If a damage repair team is in a part of the ship when it takes damage, they can be injured (reducing their effectiveness) or killed; they can only be replaced by docking at a space station.
- Science – The Science station is the only one with a long-range map that can show the entire play area. The science officer can scan ships to identify them (determining if they are friendly or enemy ships), and with further scans can determine their shield status, which indicates what attacks they are susceptible to. They can also determine distance and bearing to a target, which is useful for the helm.
- Communications – The communication officer can contact friendly ships (if there are any) to exchange messages or receive distress calls, space stations to request status and have them change or increase production, and enemy ships to encourage them to surrender. There are several enemy races in Artemis, each with their own cultural characteristics. Some races will respond badly to aggression but will surrender if a peaceful message is sent, while others are aggressive and will attack upon receiving a peace message but may back down if a display of strength is sent.
- Fighter (added in version 2.3.0) – Some types of ships support fighters, small maneuverable ships that can be deployed for additional firepower. Since version 2.6, multiple types of "fighter" ships are available: fighters, bombers, and weaponless shuttles (which can be used in peaceful missions). When a fighter ship launches, its fighter pilot flies their ship in first-person 3D space, and can target and fire at other ships. Fighters do not have warp or jump drives, and depend on their carrier ship for long-distance transportation, which requires the fighter pilot to dock with its carrier ship. If a fighter is destroyed during combat, the fighter ship is lost and must be replaced with a new one from a space station; the fighter's pilot is "dead", and the player will take on the role of a new anonymous pilot after a short penalty delay. When fighters are docked, the player has nothing else to do, so fighter pilots can play Blackjack in the hangar bay to pass the time.

An additional role is available in scripted scenarios:

- Game Master – The game master is in control of scripted scenarios, and has some capabilities to manipulate the non-player entities in the game as well as send comms messages to advance the plot of a story.

=== Modes ===
The normal mode of gameplay is a "destroy all enemies" mode. It can be played "solo" by a crew manning a single ship, co-op where players are on multiple ships each with their own bridge working cooperatively against the enemies, or PVP where players are on opposite teams trying to destroy each other. There are a multitude of options for the specific scenario and goals, difficulty, terrain, ship capabilities, etc.

The game can also be played in scripted or "mission" mode. In this mode, the terrain, ships, and actions of NPCs are controlled by a scripted file provided with the game or written by users, which enables the creation of objectives other than "destroy all enemies" as well as more advanced plot-based missions and storytelling.

== Influences and legacy ==
The largest inspiration for the design of Artemis is from Star Trek. The bridge of the spaceship is controlled by a handful of positions (all of which are positions found in Star Trek's ships, except for fighters which were added later), with a design like that of Star Trek with a main view screen, and the captain in the middle giving orders but having essentially no direct controls. The spaceship features shields, phaser-like and torpedo weapons, an optional warp drive, and a red alert. The alien races, while unique to Artemis, have parallels to Vulcans, Klingons, and other Star Trek races by being categorized as the aggressive warrior race, the peaceful logical race, etc.

Spaceteam, released two years later, bears some similarity to Artemis. While Artemis's gameplay encourages a somewhat realistic style of organized leadership and communication, Spaceteam has no chain of command with a single leader and the cross-talk between players becomes increasingly hectic and disorganized.

Star Trek: Bridge Crew, released in 2017, drew many comparisons of being "Artemis in the Star Trek universe".
