= Trek73 =

1973 video game

TREK73
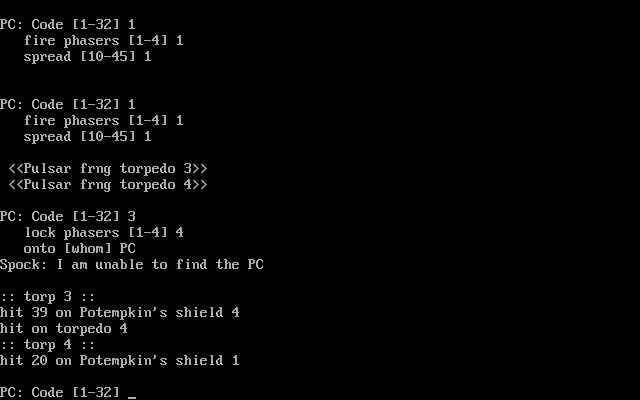
- Designers: William K. Char; Perry Lee; Dan Gee
- Series: Star Trek
- Platform: HP Time-Shared BASIC
- Release: 1973
- Genre: Space combat simulation
- Mode: Single-player

TREK73 is a video game based on the original Star Trek television series. It was created in 1973 by William K. Char, Perry Lee, and Dan Gee for the Hewlett-Packard 2000 minicomputer in HP Time-Shared BASIC. The game was played via teletype. Trek73 is so big that it needs the CHAIN feature of HP2000 BASIC.

Unlike many other Trek-themed games of the era, Trek73 is not derived from the well-known Star Trek by Mike Mayfield. Trek73 simulates multi-ship starship combat in a smaller play area and does not include the more strategic elements of the original, like starbases and the galactic map layout.

There are many minor variations of the original. Dave Korns adapted the code to support smart terminals, using the cursor control characters on the Hazeltine 2000 to produce an in-place updating display. In the mid-1980s, Dave Pare and Chris Williams translated the original BASIC version into C. Jeff Okamoto, Peter Yee, and others corrected and enhanced the source code.

== Gameplay ==
The game simulates battles between spaceships of the Star Trek universe. Through text commands, a player may order the ship to perform certain tasks in battle against an opposing vessel.

== History ==
In January 1973, William K. Char began programming a space battle game in BASIC on a time-shared Hewlett-Packard 2000C system at Wilson High School in San Francisco. The first version of what was then called $SPACE was introduced in May 1973. In June 1973, Char, Perry, Lee, and Gee started programming TREK73; it was completed October 8, 1973. Roderick Perkins adapted TREK73 for the DECISION computer at the Lawrence Hall of Science in 1974. The game was played by Homebrew Computer Club member Steve Dompier, who purchased a Teletype machine for his home so that he could play the game for hours without interruption.

== Other versions ==
An updated version was later developed on the HP2000E by the students of the San Mateo High School district. Then student Oscar Luppi and other members of the computer department added ranging, aiming and several cheat codes that became standard in newer versions.

Later, Dave Pare and Chris Williams at the University of California, Berkeley independently translated TREK73 into the C programming language in 1984. In April 1985, Jeff Okamoto and Peter Yee combined the Pare and Williams versions into one. The command set was expanded to 31. This version had enhancements based on the boardgame Star Fleet Battles. The player was also capable of designing his own ship.

David Soussan then ported the Okamoto/Yee version to MS-DOS, having played it in high school.

While at the University of Iowa, Tom Nelson and Mike Higgins played and made modifications to TREK73 on one of the University HP2000 system. In 1984, they created Begin, A Tactical Starship Simulation for MS-DOS. Begin was not a port of TREK73. It was written in C and was very much inspired by TREK73. In 1993, Higgins released Begin 2, a VGA version for MS-DOS, and in 2009 Nelson released Begin 3 for Windows.

In 1985 while at the University of Michigan, Howard Chu wrote a version of TREK73 in Turbo Pascal for MS-DOS. This may have been the first version to use a screen-oriented interface and function-key command input.

A version of TREK73 was included on Disk 10 of Fred Fish's Fish Disks for Amiga computers.

Around 1990, Chu wrote a version in C/curses for the Amiga. Unlike his Turbo Pascal version, this game is fully implemented. It uses the numeric keys instead of function keys.

== See also ==
- Begin (video game)
- Star Trek (script game)
- Star Trek (1971 video game)
- Star Trek games
