= ST3 =

ST3 may refer to:

- Ducati ST3, a motorcycle model of the Ducati ST series made from 2004–07
- Sound Transit 3, a ballot measure during the November 2016 elections in Seattle, Washington
- ST3, a version of the Scream Tracker music-tracker software
- Star Trek III: The Search for Spock, a 1984 American science fiction film.

== See also ==
- STIII (disambiguation)
