= Star Trek III.4 =

1979 video game

- Developer(s): Lance Micklus
- Publisher(s): The Software Exchange
- Series: Star Trek
- Platform(s): TRS-80
- Release: 1979

Star Trek III.4 is a 1979 video game designed by Lance Micklus and published by The Software Exchange for the TRS-80.

== Contents ==
Star Trek III.4 is a Star Trek game in which the player can attack 20 Klingon battle cruisers with phasers and photon torpedoes, and the player must also manage the science and ship's computers, warp drive, and other ship systems.

== Reception ==
Bruce Campbell reviewed Star Trek III.4 in The Space Gamer No. 36. Campbell commented that "Star Trek III.4 has provided many hours of entertainment. If you are looking for a moderately complex space simulation, I recommend this one."
