= Matt Colville =

American writer and game designer

Matthew Colville
- Other name: Matt Colville
- Occupations: Game designer, writer
- Writing career
- Years active: 1997–present
- Genres: Fantasy, tabletop role-playing games

Matt Colville is a writer and game designer. He is a former employee of Pandemic Studios and Turtle Rock Studios; Colville is now the Head of Writing and Design at MCDM Productions, a tabletop role-playing game design studio he founded in 2018. He is also known for his YouTube web series "Running the Game" where he gives guidance to players and dungeon masters of the tabletop role-playing game Dungeons & Dragons.

== Career ==
=== Game design and writing ===
Colville first worked for Last Unicorn Games. He stated that in 1997, he "started out in the tabletop industry working on the Dune CCG & RPG" before he joined Pandemic Studios where he "worked as a designer and then Lead Writer for [the video games] Mercenaries 1 & 2". Colville was then the lead writer for the video game Evolve (2015) when he worked for developer Turtle Rock Studios. In 2024, Tyler Chancey of TechRaptor commented that "Colville's influence in the TTRPG space cannot be understated", noting that Colville has contributed to "the CODA System Star Trek RPG, the (now-discontinued) Arcadia magazine, and multiple supplements for D&D 3e".

He self-published the fantasy novels Priest (2011) and its sequel Thief (2014). In 2017, Colville started co-writing with Matt Mercer on the Critical Role comics line, Critical Role: Vox Machina Origins, for Dark Horse Comics. A hardcover collection of the first six issues was released in May 2018; the trade paperback was then released in October 2019. In 2024, he contributed a vignette in the book Fifty Years of Dungeons & Dragons.

=== YouTube ===
By 2014, Colville had been a Dungeon Master for 28 years, and as a writer and game designer he shared tips on Reddit "on how Dungeon Masters can best serve their players, their stories, and their games." Colville started the YouTube series "Running the Game" in the 2010s; by 2018, his YouTube channel had over 180,000 subscribers and on Twitter he had around 40,000 followers. In 2019, Colville was the Dungeon Master of the actual play show The Chain which featured a custom character class, the illrigger, he designed.

Kym Buchanan of PopMatters called Colville's "Running the Game" series "excellent" and said that "he tries to bolster expectancy among novice DMs. In so many (rapid fire) words, Colville encourages finding the sweet spot of facilitating anxiety." On his introductory videos on how to play Dungeons & Dragons, William Herkewitz of Popular Mechanics said, "Matt's amazing intro-to-D&D videos are lengthy, but they delve even deeper into the machinery of the game than I get to in this article." Academics Michael Duddy and Benjamin Rosnau, in their study on the impact of TTRPG-specific media on players, highlighted a reference to the positive influence of Colville's instructional videos.

=== MCDM Productions ===
Colville launched a Kickstarter in 2018 to publish a guide that would help players design strongholds and other features for a Dungeons & Dragons game campaign. After seven days, his Kickstarter for Strongholds & Followers raised over $1,000,000 USD, far exceeding its $50,000 goal. Colville became known as the "King of Kickstarter" after his success on this Kickstarter. This led Colville to found MCDM Productions in 2018, with Strongholds & Followers as the company's first release. Colville is the tabletop role-playing game design studio's Head of Writing and Design. Following the release of Strongholds & Followers, MCDM Productions ran successful crowdfunding campaigns for additional Dungeons & Dragons supplements such as Kingdoms & Warfare, Where Evil Lives, and Flee, Mortals!.

He started a crowdfunding on BackerKit to publish an indie tabletop role-playing game and earned nearly $4,000,000 by January 2024. He ultimately earned $4.6 million to create this fantasy role-playing game. On the success of the crowdfunding campaign for the MCDM RPG, Chase Carter of Dicebreaker commented, "chalk up part of that windfall to Colville's career as a YouTube creator and 5E designer – he gained acclaim as the internet's favourite dungeon master by doling out advice on running D&D campaigns with a killer combination of approachability and wisdom usually only seen in community college adjuncts". Draw Steel, formerly titled the MCDM RPG, was included on Polygon's "The most anticipated TTRPG books of 2025" list. The game was released on July 31, 2025 with two sourcebooks: "Draw Steel Heroes for players and Draw Steel Monsters for game masters".
