= The Software Exchange =

Computer game production company (1979–1980)

The Software Exchange was a company that produced computer games in the late 1970s and early 1980s, primarily for the TRS-80. It has origins with SoftSide magazine.

== Games ==
- Atlantic Balloon Crossing (1979)
- Dragon-Quest Adventure (1979)
- Lost Dutchman's Gold (1979)
- Star Trek III.4 (1979)
- Westward 1847 (1979)
- Invasion From Outer Space (1980)
- The Mean Checkers Machine (1980)
- Round the Horn (1980)
