= Star Trek: The Next Generation (1993 video game) =

- North American cover art
- Developer: Imagineering Inc.
- Publisher: Absolute Entertainment
- Designers: Mark Beardsley; Gregory A. Faccone
- Programmers: Mark Beardsley; Roger Amidon (NES)
- Artists: Daniel Peters (NES); Gregory A. Faccone
- Composer: Mark Van Hecke
- Platforms: Nintendo Entertainment System, Game Boy, Game Gear
- Release: Game Boy: NA: September 1993; EU: 1993
- Genre: Large spaceship simulation
- Mode: Single-player

Star Trek: The Next Generation is a large spaceship simulation video game based on the Star Trek follow-up series of the same name. It was released in 1993 to the North American and European markets for both the Nintendo Entertainment System (NES), Game Boy, and Game Gear.

== Plot ==
Players take the role of Starfleet cadets participating in a USS Enterprise-D simulation. Taking the place of Captain Jean-Luc Picard, they must embark on a series of mission-based goals and perform many tasks (in the form of mini-games) such as diverting power to shields, Transporter Systems, Navigation, Tactical, and more.

As the player successfully completes missions, they gain rank. Starting the game as an Ensign, the player can be promoted to Lieutenant, Lt. commander, Commander, and finally Captain. Each rank has a specific password the player can input to resume the game at whatever rank the player had previously achieved. Combat missions involve fighting enemies of varying strengths and numbers, with Talarians being the weakest and renegade Klingons being the most difficult (except for the Borg, who only appear in one mission).

== Scenarios ==
At the beginning of each scenario, Captain Picard gives the player a mission, ranging from transporting ambassadors from one planet to another, to destroying Ferengi pirates, to (eventually) destroying a Borg cube.

== Reception ==
Reception

Review scores
Publication	Score
AllGame	4/5 (NES)
Video Games (DE)	52% (NES)
Power Unlimited	80% (GB)

The four reviewers of Electronic Gaming Monthly gave the NES version a 6.5 out of 10, describing the graphics as simply average; two of the four felt that the numerous options for controlling the ship's operation, while "nifty", were poorly explained, confusing, and difficult to execute during combat. GamePro cited the same problems, saying the controls offer a wealth of options but are sluggish and frustrating to operate, and the graphics are "clever, but not eye-popping by current standards." They said it is less difficult than the Game Boy original due to the color graphics and larger screen size, but summarized the game as simply a "warm-up" for upcoming Star Trek: The Next Generation games on current generation consoles. A reviewer in Starlog magazine said that both versions of the game "offer hours of entertainment and challenges." It was given a score of seven out of ten. Power Unlimited reviewed the Game Boy version and gave a score of 80% writing: "Star Trek is a great game that can be difficult at times. There are many different missions available, the game has nice graphics, the opponents are hard to beat and much more. The game is a must for Star Trek fans."
