= Star Trek: Voyager – Across the Unknown =

Star Trek video game

- Developer: Gamexcite
- Publisher: Daedalic Entertainment
- Composer: Florian Bodenschatz
- Series: Star Trek: Voyager
- Engine: Unreal Engine 5
- Platforms: Nintendo Switch 2; PlayStation 5; Windows; Xbox Series X/S
- Release: 18 February 2026
- Genres: Roguelike; Strategy; Survival
- Mode: Single-player

Star Trek: Voyager – Across the Unknown is a rogue-lite survival strategy video game developed by Gamexcite and published by Daedalic Entertainment. It is based on the TV series Star Trek: Voyager. It released in February 2026 for Nintendo Switch 2, PlayStation 5, Windows, and Xbox Series X/S.

== Setting ==
Across the Unknown begins like the first episode ("Caretaker") of Star Trek: Voyager: While searching for a rogue rebel ship, Captain Kathryn Janeway and her crew are stranded 70,000 light-years away in the Delta Quadrant, an unexplored region of the Milky Way galaxy. Their ship, the USS Voyager, is nearly destroyed, resources are dwindling, and some of the crew have vanished without a trace.

The path back to Earth consists of 12 sectors. Accordingly, the base game is also divided into 12 levels or missions, the order of which is randomly generated at the start of the game.

== Gameplay ==
A tutorial at the beginning provides an introduction to the game mechanics. The gameplay incorporates roguelike elements; star systems and events are procedurally generated.

Every mission, every alliance, and every diplomatic decision influences the further course of the story. This narrative complexity and the various storylines give the game replay value; the game features five different endings.

The gameplay or player experience is described as relatively text-heavy or reading-intensive.

The base game reportedly takes between 15 and 20 hours to complete.

== Development and retail versions ==
The game was developed using Unreal Engine 5. The game was first announced in August 2025. A demo of the game was released in October 2025. Coinciding with the release of the base game, the Deluxe DLC was launched as the first of five planned expansions (DLCs) not included in the base game. Development of the base game did not cease after its release; three patches and further content were issued in April, May, and July 2026. The second DLC, Delta Chronicles, was released in July 2026. It includes, among other things, five additional missions, two crew members—Reginald Barclay and Professor Forra Gegen—and NPC ships.

Both the base game and the expansions are also available as bundles (Deluxe Edition and Captain's Collection).

It is officially licensed by Paramount Consumer Products.

== Reception ==
Reception

Aggregate scores
Aggregator	Score
Metacritic	(PS5) 77/100 (XSX) 73/100 (PC) 74/100
OpenCritic	60% recommend (Note: Based on 15 reviews)

According to the review aggregation website Metacritic, the PlayStation 5 version of Star Trek: Voyager – Across the Unknown received generally favorable reviews from critics, while the Xbox Series X and PC versions of the game both received "mixed or average" reviews from critics. Fellow review aggregator OpenCritic assessed that the game received strong approval, being recommended by 60% of critics.

Reviewers praised, among other things, the gameplay (such as the management system) and the freedom of player choice, as well as the use of the original music and some original voice actors. Criticisms included the lack of manual saving (manual saving has since been added) and the fact that voice acting for the crew and other voice performances were only present in cutscenes.

Developer Gamexcite reported selling 100,000 copies of the game within the first four days of sale.
