= Struggle for the Throne =

Board game

Struggle for the Throne is a 1984 board game published by FASA.

== Gameplay ==
Struggle for the Throne is a Star Trek strategy game in which the players are leaders of powerful Klingon families, each seeking to replace the dying emperor using a combination of strength, diplomacy, influence, and deception.

== Reception ==
Craig Sheeley reviewed Struggle for the Throne in Space Gamer No. 71. Sheeley commented that "Struggle for the Throne is a very good product for FASA; it also puts mini-games back on the market. If you have a lot of sneaky gaming friends, then Struggle for the Throne is worth the steep price."

== Reviews ==
- Analog Science Fiction and Fact
