= Heresy: Kingdom Come =

Collectible card game

Heresy: Kingdom Come CCG
- Card back of Heresy: Kingdom Come CCG
- Publishers: Last Unicorn Games
- Players: 2
- Setup time: < 5 minutes
- Playing time: < 45 minutes
- Chance: Some
- Skills: Reading; Card playing Adding & Subtracting

Heresy: Kingdom Come is an out-of-print collectible card game (CCG) developed and published by Last Unicorn Games (LUG) in 1995. The game was based on religion-themed fantasy in a cyberpunk setting.

== Publication history ==
The base set, released in September 1995, consisted of 374 cards. An expansion called Project Demiurge with 90 cards was planned for a June 1996 release, but as a result of poor sales, no expansion sets were ever published. The company delayed the release dependent upon "sufficient orders from distributors."

== Setting ==
The theme of Heresy was the continuation of the War in Heaven between angels and demons in a futuristic cyberpunk setting. The premise is that the barriers (known in the game as the Mirror, Shroud, or Veil) between the physical realm (the Wilds), the digital realm (the Matrix), and the spiritual realm (Heaven) have grown thin, and fallen angels on Earth are trying to use the Matrix (cyberspace) to open a portal to ascend back into Heaven. Meanwhile, Earth is torn by conflict between not just the aforementioned angels and demons, but also human governments, corporations, criminal organizations, artificial intelligences, hackers, and cybernetically-enhanced humans.

== Gameplay ==
Players alternate turns. Cards are played into either of two zones, the Wilds (the physical realm) or the Matrix (the digital realm). To open a card means to turn it sideways.

A player wins once he or she has generated enough tau to open a portal with which to ascend to Heaven.

=== Card types ===
Each card is associated with one of eight convictions, as indicated by the large icon at the top right of the card: Acquisition, Devotion, Evolution, Preservation, Rebellion, Stagnation, Technology, and Tradition. There are six types of cards:

- Location cards can be opened to either generate aura or store tau:
  - Aura is always associated with one of the eight convictions, and it is used to play non-Location cards of the same conviction.
  - Tau is collected to make progress toward winning the game.
- Character cards represent individuals. They remain on the board after being played and can engage in combat.
- Aleph cards represent artifacts. Like characters, alephs remain on the board after being played.
- Enhancement cards attach to other cards, most often characters, for various effects.
- Celestial Power cards are one-time effects. They can only be played during the player's turn and are discarded after being played.
- Miracle cards are one-time effects like celestial powers, but can be played at any time, not just during the player's turn.

=== Card components ===
The card's name appears at top middle, above the art.

All cards have a large icon in the top right indicating the conviction of the card. Cards other than locations display, at the top left, call value, the requirements and cost to call (play) the card, which consists of two components:

- Call influence, indicated by the number of times that conviction icon is repeated at top left, is the minimum required number of locations of that conviction the player must control
- Call aura, indicated by a number next to those convictions icons at top left, is the amount of aura that must be paid to play the card; aura is generated by opening locations

Cards may have additional attributes in small boxes on the left side of the card:

- At top left:
  - Attack/defense, used by locations and characters, is indicated by two numbers separated by a slash preceding a stylized digraph "AD"
  - Virtual support is indicated by a number preceding a stylized digraph "VS"
- At middle left:
  - Tau storage is how much tau a location can store and is indicated by a number preceding a stylized digraph "TS"
  - Free will is indicated by a number preceding a stylized digraph "FW"
  - Aereopagus [sic] votes is indicated by a number preceding a stylized digraph "AV"

At the bottom, in order, are:

- Card types and subtypes
- Rules text, stating the card's abilities
- Flavor text, in italics

== Card size ==
While the vast majority of CCGs adhered to the standard ISO 216 B8 card size of 2.5" x 3.5", popularized by playing cards and the pioneering CCG Magic: The Gathering, Heresy was notable for instead using oversized cards with a much greater height. The similarity of the height to that of tarot cards emphasized the magical and mystical themes of the card game. The greater card size also allowed for larger art. On the other hand, the greater size was criticized for rendering the cards unable to fit in standard-sized card sleeves, as well as making shuffling difficult.

== Art ==
The larger card size showcased art by such well-known artists as Tim Bradstreet, Gerald Brom, Michael W. Kaluta, Tom Kidd, James O'Barr, Andrew Robinson, Barclay Shaw, John K. Snyder III, Karl Waller, and Bernie Wrightson.

== Reception ==
Steve Faragher reviewed Heresy for Arcane magazine, rating it an 8 out of 10 overall. Faragher comments that "Heresy is a wonderful game that proves that startlingly original atmosphere is just as important as innovative mechanics in CCG."

== Reviews ==
- Review in Shadis #23
