= Dragon-Quest Adventure =

1980 video game

- Developer(s): Charles Forsythe
- Publisher(s): The Software Exchange
- Platform(s): TRS-80
- Release: 1980
- Genre(s): Interactive fiction
- Mode(s): Single-player

Dragon-Quest Adventure (also known as Dragonquest!) is a 1980 video game published by The Software Exchange for the TRS-80, programmed by Charles Forsythe.

== Contents ==
Dragon-Quest Adventure is a game in which the dragon Smaegor has kidnapped the king's daughter and plans eats the princess at nightfall.

== Reception ==
Dave Albert reviewed DragonQuest in The Space Gamer No. 44. Albert commented that "Pick up a copy and try to rescue the princess. She needs your help."
