= Star Trek: Starship Tactical Combat Simulator =

Board game

Star Trek: Starship Tactical Combat Simulator is a 1983 game (published by FASA Corporation in 1984 as the Star Trek II Starship Combat Simulator). It is a board wargame, set in the Star Trek universe, utilizing ten-sided dice and counters to simulate tactical combat. It came into being as the combat system in Star Trek: The Role Playing Game, published by FASA, as the space combat portion of the game. Later, it was published as a separate game, still usable by players within the RPG game.

It went through several incarnations before FASA lost its licensing for the Star Trek materials. The first incarnation dealt with the duels between the USS Reliant and USS Enterprise boxed combat games. The second incarnation was the rules specific board game for the Second Edition Rules of the role playing game which dealt with larger fleet overview and more personalized ship combat rules. The third installment was the Star Trek III Combat Simulator (1984), released with a supplement to the RPG following the release of film Star Trek III: The Search for Spock. It was a cleaned up rules supplement published as several booklets and contained basically the same rules and counters as in the second installment.

Various ship recognition manuals (defining things like weaponry, defenses and engine power) and a construction manual were released in 1985 as second edition volumes without the STIII branding. They included combat efficiency and weapon damage factor statistics (useful for comparing strength but having no gameplay effect) not included in the STIII rules. The final instalment was again titled Star Trek: Starship Tactical Combat Simulator (1986) and was all but identical to its predecessor, differing mostly in being published as a single book. It could be purchased as part of a boxed set with the second edition of the role playing game or as a standalone book which excluded necessities such as maps, ship counters and record sheets.

The game manual has been updated by a non-profit gaming group. The manual can be viewed online, with new revisions highlighted.

== See also ==
- Star Trek games
