= Star Trek: The Next Generation Role-playing Game =

Science fiction role-playing game

- Designers: Christian Moore, Ross Isaacs, Kenneth Hite, Steven S. Long
- Publishers: Last Unicorn Games
- Publication: 1998 (Next Generation); 1999 (Deep Space Nine and Original Series)
- Genres: Science fiction (Star Trek)
- Systems: Icon system

Star Trek: The Next Generation Role-playing Game is a science fiction role-playing game published by Last Unicorn Games (LUG) in 1998 that is based on the Star Trek: The Next Generation television series. Critical reception was good, and LUG planned to publish other games based on the Star Trek franchise, but lost the Star Trek license in 1999.

== Description ==
Star Trek: The Next Generation Role-playing Game uses a proprietary game system developed by LUG that they called the "Icon System". Several critics noted the similarities to the D6 System developed by West End Games for their Star Wars role-playing game, but comparisons were also made to systems used in other role-playing games such as Megatraveller and Rolemaster.

=== Character creation ===
There are two possible paths to character creation.

- The player uses a pool of points to purchase "kits" that describe the player character's history, education and employment history.
- Or the player uses creation points to purchase attributes for the character.

=== Action resolution ===
A player announces that they wish to attempt a task. The gamemaster tells the player which skill will be relevant, and decides on the difficulty of the task on a scale of 1 to 15. The player rolls three dice and adds the bonus from the relevant skill. The player also rolls the "Dramatic Die". If the sum of the dice is greater than the difficulty assigned by the gamemaster and the Dramatic Die was not a 1 or a 6, then the attempt was successful. If the Dramatic Die was a 1 (critical fail), then the player rerolls the Dramatic Die and subtracts the result from the dice roll sum. If the Dramatic Die was a 6, then the player rerolls it and adds the result to the sum.

== Publication history ==
Although the Next Generation television series aired in 1987, it was not until 1998 that a role-playing game appeared after LUG acquired the license.

Although LUG was interested in creating a central role-playing game system with a core rulebook that would cover all the various Star Trek series (Next Generation, Deep Space Nine, and Voyager), licensing issues meant that LUG could only release a separate rulebook for each series.

The Next Generation Role-playing Game was the first rulebook to be released in 1998. Almost a dozen supplements quickly followed.

In 1999 LUG also published core rulebooks for a Deep Space Nine Role-playing Game and an original series role-playing game, and was developing a Voyager role-playing game for publication in 2000 when they lost the Star Trek license — subsequently acquired by Decipher Inc. — bringing all of their publications to a close.

== Reception ==
In Issue 43 of Inquest Gamer, Sean Patrick Fannon liked the Icon game system, calling it "fast and intuitive, just the way games ought to be." Fannon also liked the character creation system, which could either involve a step-by-step build, or a simple point-build. Fannon also thought the support provided for gamemasters was excellent, writing, "There are excellent guidelines for constructing adventures, including the classic three-act construct popularized in modern TV storytelling. Very effective Narrator guidelines pepper the book — I especially liked the guidelines on dealing with the Chain of Command — and there are plenty of campaign ideas." There were a few rules Fannon disliked, and he called the character illustrations "too dark and smudgy", but he gave the game a "Top Notch" rating of 5 out of 6, saying, "Not since Star Wars has a science fiction license been so successfully presented as a roleplaying experience."

In Issue 116 of the French games magazine Casus Belli, Phillipe Rat admired the look of the book, saying "the layout is impeccable and clearly highlights the numerous examples and important points of rules. There is even, the height of luxury, a complete and precise index, and a good storyline." Rat also noted the similarities between this game and the Star Wars role-playing system published by West End Gam, calling it "a refined mining of the Star Wars system." However, Rat felt that, given the storylines and game system, it would be necessary for the Narrator to create a complete crew of at least 80 people in order for the full breadth of the system's storytelling to be realized. Rat concluded by giving the game a grade of "A" for the players, but "B+" for the gamemaster.

The reviewer from the online second volume of Pyramid stated that "The ST:TNG RPG (how's that for an abbreviation?) captures the feel of the Next Generation television show right off. The cover is striking and the graphics throughout impressive, done in the "Starfleet" style of icons created for the series."

== Reviews ==
- Backstab #11
- The Comics Buyer's Guide

== Awards ==
At the 1998 Origins Award, Star Trek: The Next Generation Role-playing Game won the award for "Best Role-playing Game."

== Published materials ==
=== The Next Generation ===
- 25000 - Star Trek: The Next Generation Role-playing Game (hardcover)
- 25001 - TNG Narrator's Toolkit (book & screen)
- 25002 - TNG Player's Guide (hardcover)
- 25100 - The Price of Freedom: The United Federation of Planets Sourcebook (hardcover)
- 25101 - The First Line: Starfleet Intelligence Handbook
- 25102 - Planets of the UFP: A Guide to Federation Worlds.
- 25103 - The Way of Kolinahr: The Vulcans
- 25300 - A Fragile Peace: The Neutral Zone Campaign Volume 1
- 25301 - Planetary Adventures Volume 1: Federation Space
- 25303 - Holodeck Adventures
- 25500 - The Way of D'era: The Romulan Star Empire (Boxed Set)
- 25501 - Starfleet Academy (Boxed Set)

=== The Expanded Universe (Non-specific setting) ===
- 15002 - All Our Yesterdays: The Time Travel Sourcebook

=== Miniatures ===
- 25600 - Federation Away Team Miniatures (Boxed set containing 7 miniatures)

=== Web enhancements ===
Last Unicorn Games was one of the first roleplaying companies to use the concept of releasing additional pages for published books via the web. LUG dubbed these "Icon Links," in reference to their overall "Icon System" game mechanics (the term Web Enhancement had not been invented yet). Unlike current web enhancements, which are simply additions that can be added to the end of a book, LUG took a unique approach, by planning the enhancements ahead of time, and printing a small Icon symbol at various points in a given book, informing the reader that additional material on the subject-at-hand was available on the company's website to read or download and print. These enhancements are now being stored online, and can be downloaded from Memory Icon, under the Icon Links section.

=== Unpublished materials ===
Many additional books and supplements were planned, and quite a few had various chapters already written in varying degrees of completion when the product line was cancelled. LUG's former pool of writers has been very supportive of the fan movement to expand and continue playing the game. In support of this, much of the unpublished material has been released on the internet.

S. John Ross has posted his unfinished manuscripts on the Untaken Treks pages of his website.

Steve Kenson has posted his unfinished manuscripts on the Star Trek: The Lost Episodes pages of his website.

Steven S. Long has been the most active amongst the fan movement. He took unfinished materials for the game and completed them on his own time. Additionally, he continued this work beyond the original envisioned volumes, completing seven entire new books. These new books were distributed online free of charge.

- The Fires of Armageddon: The Dominion War Sourcebook (For DS9)

And the Spacedock Series:

- The Advanced Starship And Construction Manual
- Ship Recognition Manual 1: The Ships of Starfleet
- Ship Recognition Manual 2: The Cardassian Union
- Ship Recognition Manual 3: The Klingon Empire
- Ship Recognition Manual 4: The Original Series Era
- Ship Recognition Manual 5: The Romulan Star Empire

They can be downloaded in PDF form from Memory Icon, under the Spacedock section, and are suitable for printing.
