= Star Trek II: Starship Combat Simulator =

Board game

Star Trek II: Starship Combat Simulator is a 1984 board game published by FASA.

== Gameplay ==
Star Trek II: Starship Combat Simulator is a starship combat simulation that includes the Basic, Advanced, and Expert Starship Tactics games, as well as a role-playing system called "Command & Control".

== Reception ==
Steve Crow reviewed Star Trek II: Starship Combat Simulator in Space Gamer No. 71. Crow commented that "While I would recommend the game to anyone who owns the roleplaying version of Star Trek, it is not the best fleet tactics or one-on-one starship battle system on the market today. Its best use is to enhance the starship combat system in the RPG, and this it does excellently."

== Reviews ==
- Analog Science Fiction and Fact
