= The Search for Spock (board game) =

Board game

The Search for Spock is a 1984 board game published by FASA.

== Gameplay ==
The Search for Spock is a game in which each player chooses a character from either the Federation or Klingons to find the young Spock on the Genesis Planet before the planet disintegrates.

== Reception ==
Steve Crow reviewed The Search for Spock in Space Gamer No. 71. Crow commented that "The only reason you might wish to buy this is if you have some extra money to spend and are looking for a solitaire game. Vague rules make the game extremely difficult to play in spots and the frustration level is high. If you wish to buy The Search for Spock, be prepared to do some tinkering to make it challenging, yet survivable."
