= Aria: Canticle of the Monomyth =

Role-playing game

Aria
Canticle of the Monomyth
- Aria "Roleplaying book"
- Designers: Christian Scott Moore, Owen M. Seyler
- Publishers: Last Unicorn Games
- Publication: 1994
- Genres: Universal

Aria: Canticle of the Monomyth, also known as Aria Roleplaying, is a role-playing game published by Last Unicorn Games in 1994.

== Description ==
The rules for this role-playing system are contained in a 500-page softcover book designed by Christian Scott Moore and Owen Seyler and edited by Kirsten Kaschock, with cover art by Michael William Kaluta. Aria is based on the concept of the 'monomyth', the theory that one fundamental story is at the core of most myths, legends and fairy tales.

Unlike many other role-playing games which center on individual characters in a pre-set game world, Aria encourages players to create entire "player nations", using "Narrative Environments" (regional units such as villages or kingdoms) and "Interactive Histories" (the phases of social development).

The book is divided into two halves (each paginated separately): "Persona Creation Book", and "Myth Creation Book".

=== Creation of "player nation" ===
Using a step-by-step formula, the players determine the attributes (called "Determinants") of their player nations in the areas of Environment, Economics and Political, as well as geography, political framework, demographics, philosophical orientation, and social status divisions. Player then create a historical timeline that touches on the game world's pivotal events and major personalities.

=== Gameplay ===
Once every player has created a player nation, the resultant interplay between the players results in an interactive history — essentially the game campaign. Game time is divided into Historic Intervals, roughly equivalent to five years. Each Interval begins with an event introduced by the referee. A phase of internal development follows, with players using their Determinants and sub-Determinants to resolve Critical Junctures that may occur as a result. A phase of External development follows, with interaction between players (warfare, espionage, diplomacy, trade, etc.) During an Interval, a player may decide on taking Actions, from a list of more than two dozen possibilities. A player may declare two Internal Actions during an Interval, along with a number of External Actions equal to half of his player nation's Scope rating. All of these will be resolved by the referee at the end of the Interval, using rolls of ten-sided dice by the player matched against the relevant Determinant, with a potentially large number of optional modifiers. Tables included in the rules help the referee to resolve each Action.

=== Player character option ===
If the players wish to play a more traditional game of single personalities within the game of player nations, they can create an individual by creating a personality type. Using a point-buy system based on the character's age, the player then buys attributes and skills. Task resolution and combat use essentially the same rules as for player nations.

=== Magic ===
Unlike many other role-playing systems, the rules do not include pre-made spells. Instead, the player must decide on the purpose of the spell, and then invent their own spell, cost and effects.

== Reception ==
In the February 1995 edition of Dragon (Issue #214), Rick Swan found the rules complex and time-consuming, but the premise of the game novel. Swan warned that "The system isn't easy — here's one of the formulas for the Civil War Action: [(Power Value + Consent Value + Authority Value)/3] X 0.1 = Percent of Total Forces Controlled By Ruling Agency." But he thought that the reward for the patiently diligent player was "a gaming experience of unprecedented sweep." Although Swan liked the concept of player nations, he found the single player character system to be "an obstacle course of ambiguous rules." He called the design-your-own-spell magic system "ingenious", but allowed that developing magic spells would take much time: "If you have the patience, it's a fascinating way to spend a weekend. Or two." Swan gave Aria an average rating of 4 out of 6, liking the magic system and player nation system, but not player character creation. Calling the game "borderline brilliant", Swan concluded, "The Aria game is such a hodgepodge of breakthroughs and boo-boos, it's hard to believe it all sprung from the minds of the same two guys. But I'm willing to overlook the missteps; I'm not the kind of guy who discovers a talking dog then complains about its diction."

In the May 1995 edition of Pyramid (Issue #13), Paul Beakley liked the game, saying, "Page for page and pound for pound (the first two books are almost 600 pages of material), Aria: Canticle of the Monomyth is an excellent buy. It's sufficiently generic that its best ideas can expand any fantasy game, the art and production is beautiful, and the research and thoroughness of the game is unparalleled."

In the Christmas 1996 edition of the British game magazine Arcane (Issue 14), Andrew Rilstone found the massive rulebook to be "little more than a mega-complex character generation system." Adding to the rule complexity, Rilstone found the language dense, commenting that this is "a rulebook to be read with dictionary in hand." He was fascinated by the premise of the game where consecutive sessions, in game terms, take place weeks, years or even centuries apart. But Rilstone found that the whole thing was bogged down in endless verbiage: "Did we really need 250 brain-numbing words distinguishing between Fair and Very Fair complexion, and pointing out that in a given society 'curly and wavy hair' is uncommon?" Rilstone concluded by giving the book the lowest possible rating of only 1 out of 10 overall, saying "Verbose, obtuse, badly explained, badly organised, repetitive, over-complex, pretentious, but containing one phenomenally good idea. Aria should have been a milestone in the history of roleplaying games. Unfortunately, it has turned out to be a large and expensive doorstop instead. Aria is quite literally unplayable."

In his 2023 book Monsters, Aliens, and Holes in the Ground, RPG historian Stu Horvath noted that this game "is perhaps the apogee of the high concept RPG. It attempts to forge a game out of complex subjects, but winds up more interesting to read than to play. In fact, it is uncertain that playing Aria is a real possibility." Horvath concluded that Aria was "a game of intriguing ideas that never speaks plainly enough to truly let players embrace them."

== Reviews ==
- Shadis #17 (Jan. 1995)
- Shadis #18 (Feb. 1995)
