= Dragon Quest (TSR) =

1992 fantasy-RPG-themed board game

- Designers: William W. Connors, Walter E. Johnston, IV, David Wise
- Illustrators: Gerald Brom; Clyde Caldwell; Jeff Easley; Larry Elmore; Fred Fields; Gaye Goldsberry; Carol Heyer; David S. LaForce; Roger Loveless; Keith Parkinson; Robin Raab
- Publishers: TSR, Inc.
- Years active: 1992
- Players: 2–6
- Playing time: 60 minutes
- Chance: Dice rolling

Dragon Quest, is an adventure board game created by TSR, inc. in 1992, designed as a children's introduction to fantasy role-playing, using a simplified form of the Basic rules for Dungeons & Dragons. It was conceived as a commercial competitor for the popular fantasy board game HeroQuest.

== Description ==
Dragon Quest is a board game that uses a simplified set of rules for D&D. One player acts as a Dungeon Master and runs the game. The other players either use pregenerated player characters or create their own using blank character sheets in order to participate in prepared dungeon crawls.

The board and components

=== Components ===
The game comes with

- a large fold-out mounted square grid board representing a castle.
- A rulebook and a book of prepared adventures.
- Six plastic miniatures representing characters
- The same six miniatures cast in metal
- sheets of monsters, characters, and doors, designed to be cut apart and folded so that they stand on their own.
- a deck of cards of encounters

=== Gameplay ===
The player characters start in one area of the castle. As they move, the Dungeon Master reveals pre-planned encounters, or random encounters, both of whom the players must defeat in order to move to the next room. When the adventurers come to the end of the adventure, their characters gain one level.

== Publication history ==
In 1989, Milton Bradley, in conjunction with the British game company Games Workshop, released a fantasy adventure board game, HeroQuest, which proved to be very popular. Three years later, TSR tried to emulate this success by releasing their own adventure board game, Dragon Quest, designed by William W. Connors, Walter E. Johnston IV, and David Wise, with art by Gerald Brom, Clyde Caldwell, Jeff Easley, Larry Elmore, Fred Fields, Gaye Goldsberry, Carol Heyer, David S. LaForce, Roger Loveless, Keith Parkinson and Robin Raab. Shannon Appelcline noted that by 1993 the Basic D&D line ended and was replaced by games such as Dragon Quest (1992) and DragonStrike (1993).

== Reception ==
In the April 1993 issue of Games, Matt Costello commented, "if you're at all intrigued by fantasy roleplaying — if the idea of searching for fabulous treasures through dank dungeons where predatory monsters lurk around every corner makes your skin tingle just a little — you'll find Dragon Quest an exciting experience." Costello concluded, "It's the perfect introduction to an exciting world that too many people know too little about."

In Issue 72 of the French games magazine Casus Belli, André Foussat noted "Dragon Quest is the 'plateau' version of the first of the role-playing games: D&D. Everything is there, from the heroes ... to their alignment ... the six classic characteristics, THAC0, doors, monsters, wandering or fixed, and their treasures." Foussat was impressed by the amount of material included in the game box as well as its high quality but pointed out that although this game was a way to show non-gaming friends the basics of D&D, "You will still have to explain to them that the exploration of a basement cluttered with monsters and other more or less pleasant surprises is not the whole role-playing game, that there is a life for the characters other than between the walls of the dungeon." Toussat concluded, "TSR's tour de force also lies in the fact that this very full box is on sale (in the United States) at the ridiculous price of $22.95, which is nothing, considering its contents."

Matt Sall, writing for Bell of Lost Souls, thought that Dragon Quest provided more content than its rival, HeroQuest, writing, "Dragon Quest has a ton of content with roleplay elements and does much more to engage the player in the fantasy world. The art is fantastic! Every item, monster, and character has an in-depth description. The sheer variety of monsters, items, and spells is fantastic, even by modern standards." Sall noted that the only thing that HeroQuest had that was missing in Dragon Quest was miniatures of furniture.

== Other similarly-named games ==
In 1980, the bottom fell out of the market for board wargames, and wargame publisher Simulations Publications Inc. (SPI), looking to diversify, entered the burgeoning fantasy role-playing game market with their first role-playing game, DragonQuest. In 1982, SPI was unexpectedly taken over by TSR, owners of the most popular role-playing game, D&D. Rather than discontinuing SPI's rival RPG DragonQuest, TSR continued to release products for it.

In 1986, Japanese companies Chunsoft and Enix released an unrelated videogame in Japan called Dragon Quest. When the videogame was released in North America in 1989, Chunsoft changed the name to Dragon Warrior to avoid trademark issues with SPI's DragonQuest.

In 1992, TSR, owner of SPI's DragonQuest RPG, released their adventure board game with the confusingly similar title Dragon Quest.

When TSR itself was taken over by Wizards of the Coast in 1997, the new owners showed no interest in either DragonQuest the role-playing game or Dragon Quest the adventure board game, and in the early 2000s, allowed the trademark on both to lapse.

This allowed Square Enix, owners of the Dragon Warrior videogame franchise, to register the Dragon Quest trademark in North America. Subsequently Dragon Warrior products were released as Dragon Quest.
