= Owen Seyler =

American game designer

- Occupations: Game designer, later Event planner

Owen M. Seyler is a former game designer who worked primarily on role-playing games.

== Career ==
Owen Seyler and Christian Moore were recent college graduates when they were roommates in 1994 in Philadelphia. Moore and Seyler formed the game company Last Unicorn Games with Greg Ormand and Bernie Cahill to publish a game that Moore was working on, Aria: Canticle of the Monomyth (1994). Moore and Seyler with recent hire Ross Isaacs began the initial work to create the "Icon" system for the Star Trek: The Next Generation Role-playing Game (1998). Moore was a long-time friend of Peter Adkison, and when Last Unicorn was having financial troubles, Wizards of the Coast purchased the company in July 2000. Seyler still worked at Last Unicorn when Decipher, Inc. purchased the company in 2001. Moore and Seyler were later hired by Upper Deck.

After leaving the gaming industry, he became an event planner.
