= Christian Moore (game designer) =

American game designer

- Occupation: Game designer

Christian Moore is a game designer who has worked primarily on role-playing games.

== Career ==
Christian Moore and Owen Seyler were recent college graduates rooming together in 1994 in Philadelphia. Moore was designing what began as a set of rules for a miniatures game, and formed the game company Last Unicorn Games with Seyler, Greg Ormand, and Bernie Cahill to publish the game. Instead of a miniatures game, the design by Moore eventually became a new role-playing game, Aria: Canticle of the Monomyth (1994), and was the initial fantasy game from Last Unicorn. Moore, Seyler, and Matt Sturm created Heresy: Kingdom Come, released in September 1995, with art direction by Moore who wanted to give the game a distinctive look. Moore and Seyler originally conceived of Heresy as a role-playing game that would have been called "Chaos Possible", they decided to take a different approach and make it a collectible card game.

Moore, Seyler, and new employee Ross Isaacs began the initial work to develop the "Icon" system for the Star Trek: The Next Generation Role-playing Game (1998). Moore was one of the authors of the Star Trek Role-playing Game sourcebook Among the Clans, with S. John Ross, Steven S. Long, and Adarri Dickstein. Moore, Seyler, and Isaacs were among the people held at gunpoint when an armed intruder robbed the Last Unicorn Games design studio in Culver City in September 1999. Moore was a long-time friend of Peter Adkison, and when Last Unicorn was having financial troubles, Wizards of the Coast purchased the company in July 2000. Moore still led Last Unicorn when Decipher, Inc. purchased the company in 2001. Moore aided George Vasilakos and M. Alexander Jurkat with the Buffy the Vampire Slayer Roleplaying Game (2002). Moore and Seyler later worked for Upper Deck Company.
