= Last Unicorn Games =

American game publisher

Last Unicorn Games (or LUG) was a Pennsylvania based corporation with offices in Los Angeles, California. It was formed in 1994 by Christian Moore, Owen Seyler, Greg Ormand, and Bernie Cahill to publish the role playing game ARIA: Canticle of the Monomyth. In the following years, the company published the collectable card games (CCG) Heresy: Kingdom Come (1995), and Dune (1997).

Working with new employee Ross Isaacs, Moore and Seyler began the development of the "ICON" gaming system. This was a D6 dice based system where the player rolls a number of D6 equal to their attributes. Taking the results from only the highest die, the skill was added to the result and this total was compared to the difficulty set by the Game Master. A separate die was denoted as the Drama roll, with a result of either 1 or 6 determining the outcome as either very tragic (1) or very good (6) .

On May 21, 1998 Last Unicorn Games issued a press release announcing their acquisition of the rights to STAR TREK roleplaying games, miniatures, and live action games. The statement indicated that the company had signed a multi-year license agreement with Viacom Consumer Products, a division of Paramount Pictures, for Star Trek: The Original Series (TOS), Star Trek: The Next Generation (TNG), Star Trek: Deep Space Nine (DS9), and Star Trek: Voyager (VOY) intellectual properties.

Beginning in August 1998 until 2000, LUG published 16 rule books for the Star Trek Roleplaying Game, covering three of the four Star Trek shows (TOS, TNG, DS9).

LUG also released a customizable disk game, STAR TREK: Red Alert! in early 2000.

Due to financial troubles, Last Unicorn Games was sold to Wizards of the Coast. (WotC) in June 2000. The last RPG being developed at the time was DUNE: Chronicles of the Imperium (2000), which was subsequently published by WotC.

Wizards of the Coast soon lost the license to STAR TREK when Viacom / Paramount granted rights to Decipher, Inc, makers of the Star Trek collectible card games. After losing the license, they were unable to publish the Star Trek: Voyager Roleplaying Game that had been in the works.

By March 2001, Decipher released a statement saying that they had hired the seven-person team comprising most of the former employees of Last Unicorn Games, including Moore. The former LUG team were assigned to the Decipher RPG and Miniature division where they would focus on the development of the Star Trek Roleplaying Game.
