= Ross Isaacs =

American game designer

- Occupation: Game designer

Ross A. Isaacs is a game designer who has worked primarily on role-playing games.

== Career ==
Ross Isaacs had done freelance work for Alderac Entertainment Group and Chaosium and went on to do extensive work with Holistic Designs. Isaacs contributed to the Nephilim line from Chaosium, and joined Last Unicorn Games (LUG) soon afterwards. As a new employee at LUG, Isaacs did the initial design work on the "Icon" system for their Star Trek role-playing games, and after Icon was complete, he was made line developer for the Star Trek: The Next Generation Role-playing Game (1998). Isaacs remained with Last Unicorn when the company was bought first by Wizards of the Coast and then by Decipher, Inc. and in February 2001 Decipher offered positions in their new role-playing department to the remaining staff of Last Unicorn. Isaacs eventually returned to New York, where he worked for Eden Studios.
