= Virgin Interactive Entertainment =

Former British video game publisher

Avalon Interactive Group, Ltd.
- Logo used from 1993 to 1997
- Formerly: Virgin Games Ltd. (1983–1988, 1991–1993); Virgin Mastertronic Ltd. (1988–1991); Virgin Interactive Entertainment (Europe) Limited (1993–2003)
- Type: Private
- Industry: Video games
- Founded: 1983; 43 years ago
- Defunct: November 22, 2005
- Fate: Closed with some assets sold
- Headquarters: London, England
- Key people: Martin Alper (president); Stephen Clarke-Willson (vice president)
- Revenue: £67 million ($99 million) (1993)
- Number of employees: 500 (1997)
- Parent: Virgin Group (1983–1994); Blockbuster (1994); Spelling Entertainment (1994–1998); Titus Interactive (1999–2005)

Avalon Interactive Group, Ltd., formerly known as Virgin Interactive (Entertainment), was a British video game distributor based within Europe that formerly traded as the video game publishing and distributing division of British conglomerate the Virgin Group.

During the company's time under the Virgin brand, they had developed and published games for major platforms and employed developers, including Westwood Studios co-founder Brett Sperry and Earthworm Jim creators David Perry and Doug TenNapel. Others include video game composer Tommy Tallarico and animators Bill Kroyer and Andy Luckey.

Formed as Virgin Games in 1983, and built around a small development team called the Gang of Five, the company grew significantly after purchasing budget label Mastertronic in 1987. As Virgin's video game division grew into a multimedia powerhouse, it crossed over to other industries from toys to film to education. To highlight its focus beyond video games and on multimedia, the publisher was renamed Virgin Interactive Entertainment in 1993.

As result of a growing trend throughout the 1990s of media companies, movie studios and telecom firms investing in video game makers to create new forms of entertainment, VIE became part of the entertainment industry after being acquired by media companies Blockbuster and Viacom, who were attracted by its multimedia and CD-ROM-based software development.

Being located in close proximity to the thirty-mile zone and having access to the media content of its parent companies drew Virgin Interactive's U.S. division closer to Hollywood as it began developing sophisticated interactive games, leading to partnerships with Disney and other major studios on motion picture-based games such as The Lion King, Aladdin, RoboCop, and The Terminator, in addition to being the publisher of popular titles from other companies like Capcom's Resident Evil series and Street Fighter Collection and id Software's Doom II in the European market.

Within the late-1990s, the North American operations were sold to Electronic Arts, while the European division later went under the hands of Interplay Entertainment and Titus Interactive. They soon transitioned exclusively as a distributor and were rebranded by Titus as Avalon Interactive in August 2003, and closed in 2005 following the former's bankruptcy. Currently, the VIE library and intellectual properties are owned by Interplay Entertainment as a result of its acquisition of Titus. A close affiliate and successor of Spanish origin, Virgin Play, was formed in 2002 from the ashes of former Virgin Interactive's Spanish division and kept operating until it folded in 2009.

== History ==
=== Early history (1983–1987) ===
Nick Alexander formed Virgin Games in 1983 after leaving Thorn EMI. It was headquartered in Portobello Road, London. The firm initially relied on submissions by freelancer developers, but set up its own in-house development team in 1984, known as the Gang of Five. Early successes included Sorcery and Dan Dare. The company expanded with the acquisition of several smaller publishers, Rabbit Software, New Generation Software and Leisure Genius (publishers of the first officially licensed computer versions of Scrabble, Monopoly and Cluedo).

=== Purchase of Mastertronic and rebranding to Virgin Mastertronic (1987–1991) ===
1987 marked a turning point for Virgin after its acquisition of struggling distributor Mastertronic. Mastertronic had opened its North American headquarters in Irvine, California just a year earlier to build on its success at home (UK), though growth exhausted its resources after expanding in Europe and acquiring publisher Melbourne House. Richard Branson stepped in and offered to buy 45 percent of Mastertronic stake, in exchange Mastertronic joined the Virgin Group. Later Virgin would acquire also the rest 55% of Mastertronic.

The subsequent merger created Virgin Mastertronic Ltd. in 1988 with Martin Alper (of Mastertronic) as its president which enabled Virgin to expand its business reach overseas. Mastertronic had been the distributor of the Master System in the United Kingdom and is credited with introducing Sega to the European market, where they expanded rapidly. The Mastertronic acquisition enabled Virgin to compete with Nintendo in the growing home console market. The new owners then dissolved the Gang of Five internal development team in 1989.

=== Return to publishing (1991–1993) ===
To gain a foothold in its newly established European market, Sega Enterprises, Ltd. acquired Mastertronic from Virgin Mastertronic in 1991 while Virgin retained a small publishing unit, named Virgin Games (again). Virgin Games was renamed Virgin Interactive Entertainment (VIE, also known as Virgin Interactive) in 1993. A new London internal development team was set up in 1992.

Hasbro, who had previously licensed some of its properties to Virgin, bought 15 percent—later increased to 16.2 percent—stake in VIE in August 1993. Hasbro wanted to create titles based on its brands, which included Transformers, G.I. Joe and Monopoly. The deal cut off competitors like Mattel and Fisher-Price who were interested in a similar partnership.

In late 1993, Virgin Interactive spun off a new company, Virgin Sound and Vision, to focus exclusively on CD-based children's and family entertainment.

=== Purchase by Blockbuster Entertainment and Spelling Entertainment (1994–1998) ===
As more media companies became interested in interactive entertainment, Blockbuster Entertainment, then the world's largest video-store chain, acquired 20 percent of Virgin Interactive Entertainment in January 1994. It acquired 75 percent of VIE's stock later in 1994 and purchased the remaining shares held by Hasbro in an effort to expand beyond its video store base. Hasbro went on to found their own game company, Hasbro Interactive the following year. The partnership with Blockbuster ended a year later when Blockbuster sold its stake to Spelling Entertainment, at the time being a subsidiary of Viacom. Viacom was the owner of Paramount Pictures and MTV, which made Virgin Interactive part of one of the world's largest entertainment companies.

Blockbuster and Viacom invested heavily in the production of CD-based interactive multimedia—video games featuring sophisticated motion-picture video, stereo sound and computer animation. VIE's headquarters were expanded to include 17 production studios where expensive SGI "graphics supercomputers" were used to build increasingly complicated games, eventually becoming one of the five largest U.S.-based video game companies.

In 1995, VIE signed a deal with Capcom to publish its titles in Europe, supplanting Acclaim Entertainment as Capcom's designated European distributor. VIE later published titles released by other companies, such as Hudson Soft.

VIE's U.S. division's American development branch had adopted the name Burst in 1995 via recommendation from Neil Young. Around the same time, VIE's London development branch had adopted the name Crimson.

In 1995 the company expanded their distribution arm over to Spain, by forming Virgin Interactive España SA. In the same year, the company launched a budget reissue brand for their PC titles called "The White Label". In 1996, the company had absorbed Viacom's own video game subsidiary Viacom New Media, and its game development division in Chicago became Rabid Entertainment.

=== Re-independence and purchase of US operations by Electronic Arts (1998–1999) ===
Spelling put its ownership of Virgin up for sale as a public stock offering in 1997, stating that Virgin's financial performance had been disappointing. Since Spelling's purchase of the company, Virgin had lost $14 million in 1995 and was expected to post similar losses for 1996.

In 1998, Virgin Interactive's US operations were divested to Electronic Arts as part of its $122.5 million (£75 million) acquisition of Westwood Studios that same year. Electronic Arts also acquired the Burst Studios development studio, which was renamed to Westwood Pacific by its new owners.

VIE's European division though was put out in a majority stake buyout backed by Mark Dyne, who became its chief executive officer in the same year. Tim Chaney, the former managing director was named president.

=== Purchase by Interplay and Titus (1999–2001) ===
On February 17, 1999, Virgin Interactive announced they had entered into a distribution agreement with Interplay Entertainment, where Interplay would distribute Virgin Interactive's titles in North America and several other territories including South America and Japan, while Virgin Interactive would exclusively distribute Interplay's titles in Europe, folding their own distribution arm in the process. To coincide with the distribution agreement, Interplay acquired a 43.9% minority stake (Initially a 49.9% stake) in the company. The deal was made as part of Interplay's attempt to gain profits, and the deal did not include publishing, which would remain as stand-alone entities.

In July 1999, French publisher Titus Interactive announced plans to purchase 50.6% of Interplay's shares. Shortly after the purchase, they announced they would purchase a 50.1% majority stake in Virgin Interactive, with the publisher's shareholders and management retaining a 6% stake. The following year in May 2000, Titus acquired the shareholders' 6% stake, with Titus now holding 56.6% in Virgin while Interplay retained their 43.9% stake. Titus also announced on the same day that Virgin Interactive would now distribute its titles in Europe and replace their standalone distribution arm. The deal was made following a similar distribution agreement in North America that would allow Interplay to market Titus' titles in the territory. A week later, Virgin signed a deal with Swing! Entertainment Media AG to distribute their titles in all European territories.

Virgin's presence outside Europe at this point was almost non-existent, with only a few titles such as Viva Soccer and Jimmy White's 2: Cueball, which was distributed in the North American market by Bay Area Multimedia instead of Interplay. However, in 2001, the North American branch of Titus; Titus Software, announced to resurrect the Virgin Interactive brand in North America to release several of Virgin's existing European PC releases as $20 budget titles.

=== Acquisition by Titus, sale of Spanish operations, rebranding, and fate (2002–2006) ===
Logo as Avalon Interactive

On 16 April 2001, Titus announced they had expanded their shares in Interplay to 72.5% and purchased their stake in Virgin Interactive, making Virgin a fully owned subsidiary of Titus Interactive, S.A. The deal was done to simplify their publishing and distribution sides, with Virgin continuing to be Titus and Interplay's exclusive European distributor. The developer Crimson, who was the London's development branch, was renamed to Point Blank by its new owners during the development of Falcone: Enter the Maelstorm, which was subsequently cancelled.

On June 11, 2002, Titus announced they had accepted a management buyout of Virgin's Spanish operations; Virgin Interactive España SA, by Virgin's former CEO Tim Chaney along with former Spanish president and founder Paco Encinas. The deal was done for Titus to focus more on the UK, French and German subsidiaries. The business was renamed as Virgin Play in October, and would continue to distribute Titus and Interplay titles in Spain.

On July 1, 2003, Titus announced that Virgin Interactive would be renamed Avalon Interactive, with the French, Benelux and German operations soon following afterward.

In August 2004, the company launched a PC budget range titled "Just2Play" with Dutch publisher Xing Interactive for the UK and Benelux territories. The range was aimed to be similar to Avalon's White Label range, but with the addition of titles from Xing Interactive.

=== Closure ===
In January 2005, Titus Interactive filed for bankruptcy with €33 million ($43.8 million) debt. Avalon France and all of Titus' French operations were closed down immediately, while the UK branch continued to trade as Titus' non-French operations were unaffected. Avalon's UK operations were dissolved by November 2005.

== Games ==
- Falcon Patrol (1983)
- Falcon Patrol II (1984)
- Sorcery (1984)
- The Biz (1984)
- Strangeloop (1985)
- Doriath (1985)
- Gates of Dawn (1985)
- Hunter Patrol (1985)
- Now Games compilation series (1985–1988)
- Dan Dare: Pilot of the Future (1986)
- Shogun (1986)
- Action Force (1987)
- Action Force II (1988)
- Clue: Master Detective (1989)
- Double Dragon II (European computer versions) (1989)
- The Computer Edition of Risk: The World Conquest Game (1989)
- Silkworm (1989)
- Golden Axe (European computer versions) (1990)
- Conflict: Middle East Political Simulator (1990)
- Supremacy: Your Will Be Done (Overlord) (1990)
- Spot: The Video Game (1990)
- Wonderland (1990)
- Chuck Rock (1991)
- Robin Hood: Prince of Thieves (1991)
- Corporation (1991)
- Jimmy White's Whirlwind Snooker (1991)
- Realms (1991)
- Alien 3 (American Amiga version) (1992)
- Prince of Persia (American NES version) (1992)
- Dune (1992)
- Dune II (1992)
- Archer McLean's Pool (1992)
- European Club Soccer (1992)
- Floor 13 (1992)
- Global Gladiators (1992)
- The Terminator (1992)
- M.C. Kids (1992)
- Monopoly Deluxe (1992)
- Jeep Jamboree: Off Road Adventure (1992)
- Cannon Fodder (1993)
- Chuck Rock II: Son of Chuck (1993)
- Superman: The Man of Steel (Europe only) (1993)
- Dino Dini's Goal (1993)
- Dragon: The Bruce Lee Story (1993)
- Lands of Lore: The Throne of Chaos (1993)
- Reach for the Skies (1993)
- The 7th Guest (1993)
- Cool Spot (1993)
- Chi Chi's Pro Challenge Golf (1993)
- Super Slam Dunk (1993)
- Super Caesars Palace (1993)
- Super Slap Shot (1993)
- Disney's Aladdin (1993)
- RoboCop Versus The Terminator (1993/1994)
- The Terminator (Sega CD version) (1993)
- Cannon Fodder 2 (1994)
- Doom II: Hell on Earth (European PC version only) (1994)
- Earthworm Jim (Europe only) (1994)
- Jammit (America only) (1994)
- Super Dany (Europe only) (1994)
- Super Bomberman 2 (Europe only) (1994)
- Beneath a Steel Sky (1994)
- Walt Disney's The Jungle Book (1994)
- Dynamaite: The Las Vegas (1994)
- The Lion King (1994)
- Demolition Man (1994)
- Battle Jockey (1994)
- The 11th Hour (1995)
- Creature Shock (1995)
- Earthworm Jim 2 (Europe only) (1995)
- Super Bomberman 3 (Europe only) (1995)
- Spot Goes to Hollywood (American Mega Drive/Genesis version published by Acclaim Entertainment) (1995)
- Cyberia 2: Resurrection (1995)
- The Daedalus Encounter (1995)
- F1 Challenge (1995)
- Flight Unlimited (1995)
- Hyper 3-D Pinball (1995)
- SuperKarts (1995)
- Zone Raiders (1995)
- Sensible Golf (1995)
- Lost Eden (1995)
- Kyle Petty's No Fear Racing (1995)
- Command & Conquer (1995)
- Gurume Sentai Barayarō (1995)
- World Masters Golf (1995)
- Rendering Ranger: R2 (1995)
- Agile Warrior F-111X (1995)
- Lone Soldier (Japan only) (1996)
- The Mask (Japan only) (1996)
- Resident Evil (Europe and PC versions only) (1996)
- Ghen War (Europe/Japan) (1996)
- NHL Powerplay '96 (1996)
- Street Fighter Alpha 2 (Europe only) (1996)
- Time Commando (Japan only) (1996)
- Broken Sword: The Shadow of the Templars (1996)
- Command & Conquer: Red Alert (1996)
- Disney's Pinocchio (1996)
- Queensrÿche's Promised Land (1996)
- Toonstruck (1996)
- Slamscape (Europe only) (1996)
- Super Puzzle Fighter II Turbo (PS1 and Saturn versions, Europe only) (1996)
- Golden Nugget (1997)
- Grand Slam (1997)
- Subspace (1997)
- Agent Armstrong (1997)
- Black Dawn (1997)
- Blam! Machinehead (Japan only) (1997)
- CrimeWave (Japan only) (1997)
- Marvel Super Heroes (Europe only) (1997)
- NanoTek Warrior (1997)
- Lands of Lore: Guardians of Destiny (1997)
- Broken Sword II: The Smoking Mirror (1997)
- Mega Man X3 (PS1 and Saturn versions, Europe only) (1997)
- NHL Powerplay '98 (1997)
- Sabre Ace: Conflict Over Korea (1997)
- Ignition (1997)
- Blade Runner (1997)
- Viva Football (titled as Viva Soccer in North America) (1998)
- Bloody Roar: Hyper Beast Duel (Europe only) (1998)
- Bomberman GB (Europe only) (1998)
- Magic & Mayhem (Europe only) (1998)
- Pocket Fighter (European PS1 version) (1998)
- R-Types (Europe only) (1998)
- Rival Schools: United by Fate (Europe only) (1998)
- Resident Evil 2 (Europe only) (1998)
- Street Fighter Collection 2 (European publishing rights only) (1999)
- Bloody Roar 2 (European publishing rights only) (1999)
- Bomberman (European publishing rights only) (1999)
- Bomberman Quest (European publishing rights only) (1999)
- Capcom Generations (Europe only) (1999)
- Kagero: Deception II (European publishing rights only) (1999)
- Dino Crisis (European publishing rights only) (1999)
- Holy Magic Century (European publishing rights only) (1999)
- Street Fighter EX2 Plus (European publishing rights only) (1999)
- Marvel Super Heroes vs. Street Fighter (European publishing rights only) (1999)
- Street Fighter Alpha: Warriors' Dreams (European publishing rights only) (1999)
- Marvel vs. Capcom: Clash of Super Heroes (European publishing rights only) (2000)
- Tech Romancer (European publishing rights only) (2000)
- Operation WinBack (European publishing rights only) (2000)
- Marvel vs. Capcom 2: New Age of Heroes (European publishing rights only) (2000)
- Bomberman Fantasy Race (European publishing rights only) (2000)
- Plasma Sword: Nightmare of Bilstein (European publishing rights only) (2000)
- Street Fighter III: Double Impact (European publishing rights only) (2000)
- Street Fighter Alpha 3 (European publishing rights only) (2000)
- Dino Crisis 2 (European publishing rights only) (2000)
- Gunlok (Europe only) (2000)
- Super Runabout: The Golden State (European publishing rights only) (2000)
- Strider 2 (European publishing rights only) (2000)
- Giga Wing (European publishing rights only) (2000)
- Capcom vs. SNK (European publishing rights only) (2000)
- Resident Evil 3: Nemesis (European Dreamcast version only) (2000)
- Trick'N Snowboarder (European publishing rights only) (2000)
- Jimmy White's 2: Cueball (Distributed in North America by BAM! Entertainment) (2000)
- Pocket Racing (European publishing rights only) (2000)
- Mr. Driller (Dreamcast and GBC versions, Europe only) (2000)
- JoJo's Bizarre Adventure (European publishing rights only) (2000)
- Street Fighter III: 3rd Strike (European publishing rights only) (2000)
- Evolva (European publishing rights only) (2000)
- Project Justice (European publishing rights only) (2000)
- Heist (titled as Raub in Germany) (2001)
- Gunbird 2 (European publishing rights only) (2001)
- European Super League (Europe Only) (2001)
- 3D Pocket Pool (Europe Only) (2001)
- Project Justice: Rival Schools 2 (European publishing rights only) (2001)
- Bloody Roar III (European publishing rights only) (2001)
- Original War (2001)
- Screamer 4x4 (2001)
- Codename: Outbreak (2001)
- Lotus Challenge (European PS2 version) (2001)
- Magic & Mayhem: The Art of Magic (European publishing rights only) (2001)
- Jimmy White's Cueball World (Europe exclusive game) (2001)
- Resident Evil: Gaiden (European publishing rights only) (2001)
- Nightstone (2001)
- Guilty Gear X (European publishing rights only) (2002)

=== European distributed titles ===
This category includes titles that were distributed by Virgin Interactive in European territories.

Title	Year	Platform(s)	Publisher(s)
R/C Stunt Copter	1999	PlayStation	Interplay
Carmageddon	1999	PlayStation	SCi
Carmageddon	1999	Game Boy Color	SCi
Carmageddon 64	1999	Nintendo 64	SCi
Earthworm Jim 3D	1999	Nintendo 64, Microsoft Windows	Interplay
Invictus	2000	Microsoft Windows	Interplay
Renegade Racers	2000	PlayStation; Microsoft Windows	Interplay
Messiah	2000	Microsoft Windows	Interplay
MDK2	2000	Microsoft Windows; Dreamcast	Interplay
Descent 3	2000	Microsoft Windows	Interplay
Caesars Palace 2000	2000	PlayStation; Dreamcast; Microsoft Windows	Interplay
Star Trek: Klingon Academy	2000	Microsoft Windows	Interplay
Icewind Dale	2000	Microsoft Windows	Interplay
Draconus: Cult of the Wyrm	2000	Dreamcast	Interplay
Star Trek: New Worlds	2000	Microsoft Windows	Interplay
Baldur's Gate II: Shadows of Amn	2000	Microsoft Windows	Interplay
Hercules: The Legendary Journeys	2000	Nintendo 64	Titus
Blues Brothers 2000	2000	Nintendo 64	Titus
Bangai-O	2000	Dreamcast	Swing!
Casper	2000	Game Boy Color	Interplay
Sacrifice	2000	Microsoft Windows	Interplay
Incredible Crisis	2000	PlayStation	Titus
Kao the Kangaroo	2000	Dreamcast; Microsoft Windows	Titus
Virtual Pool 3	2000	Microsoft Windows	Interplay
Giants: Citizen Kabuto	2000	Microsoft Windows (Note: The PlayStation 2 version was distributed by Empire Interactive.)	Interplay
Star Trek: Starfleet Command II: Empires at War	2000	Microsoft Windows	Interplay
Worms World Party	2001	Dreamcast; Microsoft Windows	Titus
Virtual Kasparov	2001 (PS1); 2002 (GBA)	PlayStation; Game Boy Advance	Titus
Fallout Tactics: Brotherhood of Steel	2001	Microsoft Windows	Interplay
Exhibition of Speed	2001	Dreamcast	Titus
Baldur's Gate II: Throne of Bhaal	2001	Microsoft Windows	Interplay; Black Isle
Starfleet Command: Orion Pirates	2001	Microsoft Windows	Interplay
Hands of Time	2001	Game Boy Color	Titus
Top Gun: Firestorm	2001	Game Boy Color	Titus
Xena: Warrior Princess	2001	Game Boy Color	Titus
Hercules: The Legendary Journeys	2001	Game Boy Color	Titus
RoboCop	2001	Game Boy Color	Titus
Prehistorik Man	2001	Game Boy Advance	Titus
Rox	2001	Game Boy Advance	Titus
Top Gun: Combat Zones	2001 (PS2); 2002 (GCN); 2003 (PC)	PlayStation 2 GameCube; Microsoft Windows	Titus
Stunt GP	2001	PlayStation 2	Titus
Planet Monsters	2001	Game Boy Advance	Titus
Kao the Kangaroo	2001	Game Boy Advance	Titus
Baldur's Gate: Dark Alliance	2001	PlayStation 2 (Note: Later releases, as well as the Xbox and GameCube versions are distributed by Vivendi Universal Games.)	Interplay; Black Isle
MDK2: Armageddon	2001	PlayStation 2	Interplay
Tir et But: Edition Champions du Monde	2002	Game Boy Advance	Titus
Hunter: The Reckoning	2002	Xbox	Interplay
Top Gun: Firestorm Advance	2002	Game Boy Advance	Titus
Icewind Dale II	2002	Microsoft Windows	Interplay; Black Isle
Downforce	2003	PlayStation 2, Game Boy Advance	Titus
Lionheart: Legacy of the Crusader	2003	Microsoft Windows	Interplay; Black Isle
Run Like Hell	2003 (PS2); 2004 (Xbox)	PlayStation 2 Xbox	Interplay
RoboCop	2003	PlayStation 2, Xbox, Microsoft Windows	Titus
Barbarian	2003	PlayStation 2 Xbox	Titus
Baldur's Gate: Dark Alliance II	2004	PlayStation 2 Xbox	Interplay
Fallout: Brotherhood of Steel	2004	PlayStation 2 Xbox	Interplay
