= Nightmare Busters =

- Developer: Arcade Zone (Note: Ported to mobile phones by Cybiko, Rebirth revival by Aurora Game Studio)
- Publisher: Super Fighter Team (Note: Mobile phone port was published by In-Fusio)
- Producer: Brandon Cobb
- Designers: Christophe Gayraud; Jean‑Christophe Alessandri
- Programmer: Christophe Gayraud
- Artists: Jean‑Christophe Alessandri; Lyes Belaidouni
- Composers: Michel Golgevit; Olivier Rabat
- Platform: Super NES
- Release: WW: December 23, 2013
- Genres: Action, run and gun
- Modes: Single-player, multiplayer

Nightmare Busters is a 2013 run and gun action video game developed by Arcade Zone and Super Fighter Team for the Super Nintendo Entertainment System. It is the first new game for the console in North America since Frogger (1998), fourteen years after being discontinued in North America. A mobile phone version called Flynn's Adventure was released in 2004. A revival titled Nightmare Busters Rebirth was announced in 2021 for consoles and PC. The game follows the leprechaun twin brothers Flynn and Floyd on their journey to stop Tyrant from infiltrating and turning children's dreams into nightmares. The player is tasked with fighting off enemies by using playing cards and magic attacks across six stages, populated with an assortment of obstacles.

Nightmare Busters was conceived by late programmer Christophe Gayraud, a former Titus Interactive who worked on The Blues Brothers and The Brainies for Super NES. Gayraud acted as co-designer with Jean‑Christophe Alessandri, a freelance art designer who worked on Prehistorik and Prehistorik Man. It was previewed in 1994 and showcased at Shoshinkai 1994, originally slated to be published by Sony and Nichibutsu, but development stopped when Sony abandoned distribution of Nintendo-related products with the introduction of PlayStation in Europe and Nichibutsu dropped the title for unknown reasons. Arcade Zone shut down due to being incapable of publishing their own games, while subsequent decrease of the Super NES market kept it from being released.

Production resumed in partnership with Gayraud and Alessandri, after Brandon Cobb of Super Fighter Team came across with the mobile phone port and was introduced to Gayraud by Eric Thommerot of In-Fusio. Journalists praised the European animation-style visuals, dark fantasy tone, simple gameplay, and responsive controls, but its audio and other flaws were criticized. According to Cobb in a 2016 interview, Nightmare Busters sold the most units for Super Fighter Team.

== Gameplay ==
Gameplay screenshot.

Nightmare Busters is a run and gun action game similar to Contra and Gunstar Heroes. The game can be played in single-player, or cooperatively with a partner. The game follows the leprechaun twin brothers Flynn and Floyd in their journey to stop the diabolic Tyrant from infiltrating children's dreams and turning them into nightmares. There are five stages in total, which include a village, a forest, a cave, and a castle, populated with an assortment of obstacles. The objective of each stage is to reach the end by shooting at every enemy that gets in the way, and fight a boss to progress further. Both Flynn and Floyd can attack with playing cards and magic attacks that can be swapped at will.

Each character is capable of sliding to avoid hazards and perform a dash maneuver to damage enemies. The players can obtain new weapons from treasure chests and barrels, which include alternate shot types: fire cards, an energy axe, a twin shot, a sideshot, a thunder burst, and a shock sphere. Additional items can be found within chests and barrels, or dropped by defeated enemies. Both Flynn and Floyd can collect up to a hundred dominoes to gain an extra life. Each character has a life gauge that allows the player to take two hits from an enemy before losing a life. However, obstacles such as pits or spikes will instantly kill a player.

== Development and release ==
Nightmare Busters was created by Arcade Zone, a London-based game development company established by former Loriciel and Titus Interactive members to create games for home consoles, which had previously developed Legend and Iron Commando on Super NES. The game was conceived by programmer Christophe Gayraud, who worked on The Blues Brothers and The Brainies for the Super NES. Jean‑Christophe Alessandri, a freelance artist who worked on Prehistorik and Prehistorik Man, served as co-designer with Gayraud and as art designer. Lyes Belaidouni, an art director at Arcade Zone, also provided additional artwork. The soundtrack was composed by Michel Golgevit and Olivier Rabat. It was produced by Brandon Cobb of Super Fighter Team, a California-based game production and publishing house founded in 2005 whose primary focus is producing and publishing new titles for platforms such as the Sega Mega Drive/Genesis and Atari Lynx.

Nightmare Busters was first previewed in 1994 and later showcased to attendees at Shoshinkai 1994. It was originally slated to be published by Sony and Nichibutsu, but Carlo Perconti of Arcade Zone explained in a 2008 interview that development of the game stopped as a result of Sony abandoning distribution of Nintendo-related products with the introduction of the PlayStation in Europe, while Nichibutsu dropped the title for unknown reasons. Arcade Zone was shut down due to being incapable of publishing their own titles and no longer able to find interested publishers. However, Cobb claimed that although several companies showed interest in publishing the title, factors such as the subsequent decrease of the Super NES market kept it from being released. In 2004, a port of the game called Flynn's Adventure was showcased at E3 2004 and released for mobile phones. This version was developed by Cybiko, which merged with publisher In-Fusio late that year, and produced by Eric Thommerot. In 2007, a prototype ROM image of the original SNES version was leaked online, allowing for it to be played via emulation.

Development on the SNES version was resumed in partnership with Gayraud and Alessandri, after Cobb came across with the mobile phone adaptation and was introduced to Gayraud by Thommerot. Cobb claims that there were no conflicts in order to release the title between Super Fighter Team and Nintendo, with whom they were in contact, as the company does not support nor grants developer licenses for their discontinued platforms but stated that manufacturing was the most expensive process due to high cost of components. Pre-orders for the game opened in 2012 but strong demand prompted Super Fighter Team to double the initial run to 600 copies, which sold out within two to three weeks and as a result, the company increased the number of copies to 1200. Gayraud died of a heart attack on April of that same year, prior to the game's launch. Nightmare Busters launched worldwide on December 23, 2013, becoming the first new game for the console in fourteen years since Frogger (1998) after being discontinued in North America, complete with packaging mimicking officially licensed SNES releases. In 2015, Super Fighter Team announced that the game would receive a reprint. A "collector's edition" limited to 150 copies was also produced by Past Game Rebirth.

In 2021, a revival titled Nightmare Busters Rebirth was announced to be in production by Aurora Game Studio with some of the original developers and planned to be published by Pix'n Love Games for consoles and PC. The revival will feature redone graphics and audio, hand-drawn animations, reworked level design and difficulty, and new modes. As of May 2025, the game is scheduled to be released in 2026.

== Reception ==
Reception

Review scores
Publication	Score
GameSpot	7.3/10 (Mobile)
Mobile Game FAQS	84/100 (Mobile)

In a preview of the mobile phone conversion, IGN's Levi Buchanan noted the visuals for their colorful and detailed sprites, and backgrounds. GameSpot's Ryan Davis found the graphics to be technically and aesthetically pleasing, highlighting its dark fantasy tone reminiscent of Rayman, parallax scrolling, and character sprites, regarding Flynn's Adventures to be one of the more visually accomplished mobile games. Davis also commended the simple gameplay for being well realized and responsive controls, but criticized the audio and other flaws. Mobile Game FAQS' Costas Stephanides mostly concurred with Davis, praising the mobile port for its audiovisual presentation, controls, playability, and overall longevity.

TechRaptor's Robert Grosso gave the original Super Nintendo Entertainment System version positive remarks to the European animation-style graphical presentation, straightforward gameplay, and challenge. Nicolas Gilles of Obsolete Tears also reviewed the Super NES release, commending the "beautiful" visuals and gameplay. Classic-Games.net disagreed with the other writers when reviewing the SNES version, stating that "Nightmare Busters had potential. With a late game pass to smooth out its rough edges it could have been great. But as is the game is frustrating for all the wrong reasons. With practice you can see all of its content but overall I feel that time is better spent elsewhere." According to Brandon Cobb in a 2016 interview, the game sold the most units for Super Fighter Team.
