= Downforce (video game) =

2002 video game

- North American PlayStation 2 box art
- Developers: Smart Dog (PlayStation 2); Karma Studios (GBA)
- Publisher: Titus Interactive
- Platforms: PlayStation 2, Game Boy Advance
- Release: Game Boy Advance: EU: 17 May 2002; PlayStation 2: NA: 29 May 2002; EU: 28 March 2003; DE: 30 April 2003
- Genre: Racing
- Modes: Single-player, multiplayer

Downforce is a 2002 racing video game for the PlayStation 2 and Game Boy Advance developed by Smart Dog and published by Titus Interactive, and was distributed by Virgin Interactive Entertainment in Europe. It sets Formula One races in street racing settings with an emphasis on speed and collisions. Upon release, Downforce received mixed reviews, with critics praising the game's departure from traditional Formula One titles through the use of fast gameplay and collisions, but critiquing the general lack of variety in gameplay modes, cars, and tracks to sustain interest. A proposed sequel and ports to the Xbox and GameCube were never realized by the developer.

== Gameplay ==
Screenshot of gameplay, depicting the user interface.

Downforce is an arcade racing game in which players compete in races to finish laps using Formula One cars across street racing and arena tracks. Players can select one of fourteen cars to race, with each driven by a character from a different nation. The main race modes include Championship and Trophy, where the player competes in a ranked series of races of increasing difficulty and must rank a place to progress, unlocking new tracks in the process. The game contains several additional race modes, including Free Race, where the player can race in any unlocked tracks, individually or in split screen mode with two players, Time Attack and Time Trial, where the player attempts to complete a race against checkpoints or in the fastest time. The game includes "realistic crash" physics, where a player or competitor's collision against the environment will cause pieces of the car to fly off the vehicle.

== Development ==
Downforce was developed by Smart Dog Software, a partner studio that has previously developed Roadsters and All Star Tennis '99. The game was announced by publisher Titus Interactive in May 2001, with a trailer for the game circulated in March 2002. Development on a Game Boy Advance version of Downforce was outsourced to Dutch company Karma Studios. Downforce director David Saunders discussed that the game's design involved a departure from realistic simulation racing and licensed Formula One tracks and brands to return "excitement" to races without restrictions on "design, cars, tracks, looks [or] rules". The development team aimed to balance the realism of a "very fast arcade racing experience" with a more enjoyable approach based upon street racing and the "extreme danger" of collisions. Plans for a sequel, wider release and ports to the GameCube and Xbox were abandoned, with Titus Interactive delaying the game due to expected poor sales during the summer months.

== Reception ==
Reception

Aggregate score
Aggregator	Score
Metacritic	69%

Review scores
Publication	Score
Eurogamer	7/10
Game Informer	7/10
GameSpot	7.2/10
GameSpy	68%
GameZone	7.8/10
IGN	7.1/10
Official U.S. PlayStation Magazine	2/5
Play	3/5
Total Games	82%

According to review aggregator Metacritic, Downforce received "mixed or average" reviews from critics. Positive reviews of the game praised the game's departure from traditional Formula One conventions. Jeremy Dunham of IGN commended the game's simplicity aided its appeal as an arcade racer, highlighting its "sheer speed", "feverishly competitive difficulty", and "terrific track design". Describing the game as an "essential racing purchase for speed freaks", Dave Halverson of Play praised the gameplay as "skillfully balanced" and fast-paced, and enjoyed the "unique look" afforded by the game's visual design. Nick Valentino of GameZone viewed the game was a "wonderful ode to the old-school racing games of yesteryear", citing its "smooth and easy to learn" controls, "decent" graphics and "gruesome" crash effects, overall considering the game to be entertaining as an arcade racing title in spite of its "lack of innovation".

Critiques of Downforce focused on its limited features and gameplay modes. Considering the game to be "redundant" and offer no features that "hundreds of other racing games haven't done before", John Davison of Official U.S. PlayStation Magazine critiqued the game for its "boring tracks". Describing the game as "simple", Amer Ajami of GameSpot noted the game had "no additional gameplay mechanics, control schemes or anything of the like", stating there "really isn't much to it" due to its lack of "compelling gameplay modes". Mike Richardson of Total Games considered that the game's modes and unlockable were not "quite enough", feeling the game was "very basic" and that "there is little to keep you coming back. Matthew Kato of Game Informer similarly felt the game "ultimately lacks depth". David Hodgson of GameSpy similarly considered the game to be "incredibly short" and feature "alarmingly few" cars, tracks or customizations, also noting the game's characters were "hackneyed and underused".
