= World Masters (disambiguation) =

The World Masters was a snooker tournament held in January 1991.

World Masters may also refer to:

- World Masters (darts), one of the longest running and most prestigious professional darts tournaments
- World Dressage Masters, an international dressage series held since 2009
- World Pool Masters Tournament, an annual international nine-ball tournament, known short as World Pool Masters
- World Ranking Masters, ten-pin bowling's international ranking system
- World Tenpin Masters, an annual Ten-pin bowling tournament
- World Masters Games, an international multi-sport event held every four years
- World Masters Athletics, the worldwide governing body for the sport of masters athletics
  - World Masters Athletics Championships, biannual championships for athletics events held by the World Masters Athletics
- World Masters Golf, a golf simulation video game for the Super NES released exclusively in Europe
