= Hands of Time (video game) =

2001 video game

- Cover art
- Developer: Mirage Media S.C.
- Publisher: Titus Interactive SA
- Composer: Krzysztof Wierzynkiewicz
- Platform: Game Boy Color
- Release: October 2001
- Genre: Action
- Mode: Single-player

Hands of Time is a 2001 action game for the Game Boy Color developed by Mirage Media S.C. and published by Titus Interactive SA. The game's story features time travel, in which the player travels to the past to destroy a time machine that has led to events creating a world war.

== Gameplay ==
In-game screenshot

Hands of Time is a top-down action game set across a small overworld. The game features a puzzle element, item-swapping sequences that must be solved in order to progress, and combat with enemy soldiers in between. The player starts with a small pistol with infinite ammo, and can collect more powerful weapons. Progress across the game is saved via passwords.

== Reception ==
Reception

Review scores
Publication	Score
AllGame	3/5
Total Game Boy	77%
Game Boy Xtreme	78%

Reception of Hands of Time was mixed. Total Game Boy expressed confusion about its unorthodox plot and setting, stating "We don't quite get this game...the more you play it, the stranger it gets. It's basically a shoot 'em up RPG, but there are so many strange elements to the story you have to wonder whether the designers...just decided to do whatever came into their heads." Game Boy Xtreme noted that whilst the story was "interesting" and the maps were "intelligently designed", the game featured "weak graphics".
