= Ardy Lightfoot =

1993 video game

- North American box art
- Developer: ASCII Corporation
- Publishers: JP: ASCII Corporation; NA/EU: Titus Interactive
- Director: Masami Yamamoto
- Producer: Takeshi Kaneda
- Designer: Noburo Wada
- Programmer: Takumi Inoue
- Artist: Takashi Tory
- Writer: Ichirō Sugiyama
- Composers: Akiko Hashimoto; Katsuhiro Hatano
- Platform: Super Nintendo Entertainment System
- Release: JP: November 26, 1993; NA: February 1994; EU: 31 October 1994
- Genre: Platform
- Mode: Single-player

Ardy Lightfoot (Note: Japanese: アルディライトフット, Hepburn: Arudi Raitofutto) is a 2D side-scrolling platform game released on the Super Nintendo Entertainment System in 1993 in Japan and 1994 in the west. It was developed by ASCII and published by Titus France in North America and Europe.

== Gameplay ==
Ardy and Pec go to the Mining Town Ablaze, the first level.

The game controls anthropomorphic title character ferret Ardy and his friend, a blue creature named Pec. Pec is able to transform, taking on forms such as a weapon, a red hot air balloon, or a rock wall destroyer. These forms allow Pec to be used both for combat and for solving environmental puzzles. If Ardy is hit by an enemy, Pec dissolves and can only be retrieved by finding a treasure chest. Without Pec, Ardy is still able to attack by bouncing on his own tail. He can also protect himself temporarily by hiding behind a clear mirror.

== Plot ==
The sacred rainbow has shattered into seven crystal pieces, and it is up to Ardy to obtain them all. Whoever collects all seven crystal pieces will receive a wish. The evil King Visconti has already gotten one crystal piece, and he is searching for the other pieces. To this end, he sends out his followers, including Beecroft, Catry and many others. Ardy is assisted by friends along the way, like the unnamed elder, Nina, and a mysterious adventurer named Don Jacoby.

Although the ending screen says "To be continued", no sequel was ever made.

== Development and release ==
When Titus published Ardy Lightfoot for North American audiences, several changes were introduced. These included numerous sprites, such as Ardy's "waiting" pose, being removed; tied up and crying animals being removed from the background on the forest level; and in level 6, "Eaten!", Catry's gruesome death by acid was written out of the plot; instead of being reduced to a pile of bones, she is merely knocked unconscious.

== Reception ==
Reception

Review scores
Publication	Score
Computer and Video Games	2/5
Electronic Gaming Monthly	8/10, 7/10, 6/10, 7/10, 8/10
Famitsu	7/10, 4/10, 5/10, 7/10
Official Nintendo Magazine	78/100, 66/100
Super Play	83%
Total!	65/100
Hippon Super!	7/10
Super Gamer	74/100
VideoGames	7/10

Ardy Lightfoot garnered average reviews from critics. Electronic Gaming Monthly praised the game for its huge levels, numerous character abilities, and impressive bosses, but warned prospective buyers that a great deal of patience is required, due to the game's extremely high difficulty. GamePro gave it a positive review, as well, citing the varied gameplay and cartoony and colorful graphics. Super Play praised the game's graphics, animation and sound.
