= Planet Monsters =

2001 video game

- Developer: Planet Interactive
- Publisher: Titus
- Platform: Game Boy Advance
- Release: 2001
- Genre: Action
- Mode: Single-player

Planet Monsters is a 2001 video game developed by Planet Interactive Development and published by Titus for the Game Boy Advance. It is an action and arcade style game in which players must navigate a maze of monsters and defeat them by pushing blocks and using weapons. Upon release, the game received mixed reviews, with critics comparing the game's design to earlier arcade titles including Pengo.

== Gameplay ==
Gameplay screenshot

The premise of Planet Monsters involves a world in which humans have been transformed into monsters, who battle in arenas to settle their disputes. The objective of gameplay is to navigate a maze to defeat opponents within a time limit, with the level cleared when all monsters are defeated. Opponents can be defeated by pushing blocks into their path or using a weapon, including a bomb, gun and bowl; however, if the player touches an opponent or the opponent pushes a block into a player, the player loses a life. There are different enemy types that move at different speeds. Other power-ups include alarm clocks that freeze enemies, and let the player jump over blocks and obstacles. The game features 40 levels, with 5 planets each containing 8 stages, each ending with a boss battle. A password save system is also used. Planet Monsters also features a multiplayer mode for up to four players using the Game Link Cable, for other players with a copy of the game.

== Reception ==
Reception

Aggregate score
Aggregator	Score
Metacritic	67%

Review scores
Publication	Score
AllGame	2.5/5
Edge	4/10
Game Informer	7.75/10
GameSpot	5.1/10
Nintendo Power	3.7/5
Official Nintendo Magazine	85%
Game Boy Xtreme	79%

Planet Monsters received "mixed or average" reviews according to review aggregator Metacritic. Several critics compared the design of the game to titles including Pengo, Pac-Man and Bomberman, with Edge stating the game was a "brazen reworking" of the concepts of those games. Simon Brew of Game Boy Extreme found the game simple, fun and addictive, although stated it was unoriginal and the gameplay could be repetitive. Considering the game to be a "good mix of strategy and quick-fire reflexes", Game Informer praised its "inventive" levels and boss battles. Although finding the game an "entertaining" diversion, Edge critiqued the game's "lack of variety". Similarly, Skyler Miller of Allgame felt the game was "unfocused and strictly average" as the game, writing that the game's single-player mode had a "bland, thrown-together feel" that was inferior to its multiplayer. Gerald Villoria of Gamespot stated that "while clever enough in theory and adequate in execution", Planet Monsters suffered from several "noticeable flaws", including a long startup splash screen, the lack of a save function, and "shoddy" presentation.
