= Super Cauldron =

1992 video game

- Developer: Titus France
- Publisher: Titus France
- Designer: Vincent Berthelot
- Composers: Grégory Makles (Amiga); Christian Lier (CPC)
- Platforms: Atari ST, Amiga, MS-DOS, Amstrad CPC
- Release: 1992: MS-DOS; 1993: Amiga, ST, CPC
- Genre: Platform
- Mode: Single-player

Super Cauldron is a single-player side scrolling platform game released by Titus Software. Originally released in 1992 on MS-DOS machines, ports for the Atari ST, Amiga, and Amstrad CPC were all released in 1993 after commercial success.

== Gameplay ==
In Super Cauldron, the players play as a young witch, Zmira, on a quest to find ingredients to put into a Super Cauldron to cast a Super Spell to defeat an evil sorcerer, Marl. The players explore a side-scrolling map filled with puzzles, platforming obstacles, and enemies. Players use weapons (throwing rocks) and are aided by powerups to defeat said enemies and aid in solving puzzles. For example, upon acquiring a broomstick powerup, the player can fly on a broom for a limited time. The player must face off against enemies on ground (trolls), and in air (flying bats and birds). The game consists of 3 levels (or 'worlds'), of increasing difficulty level. A boss battle is present at the end of the third level.

An arcade-style score system allows players to attempt to get the highest score possible, making replayability an important piece of gameplay. In addition, a light catchy tune compliments the whimsical, pixelated graphics.

== Development ==
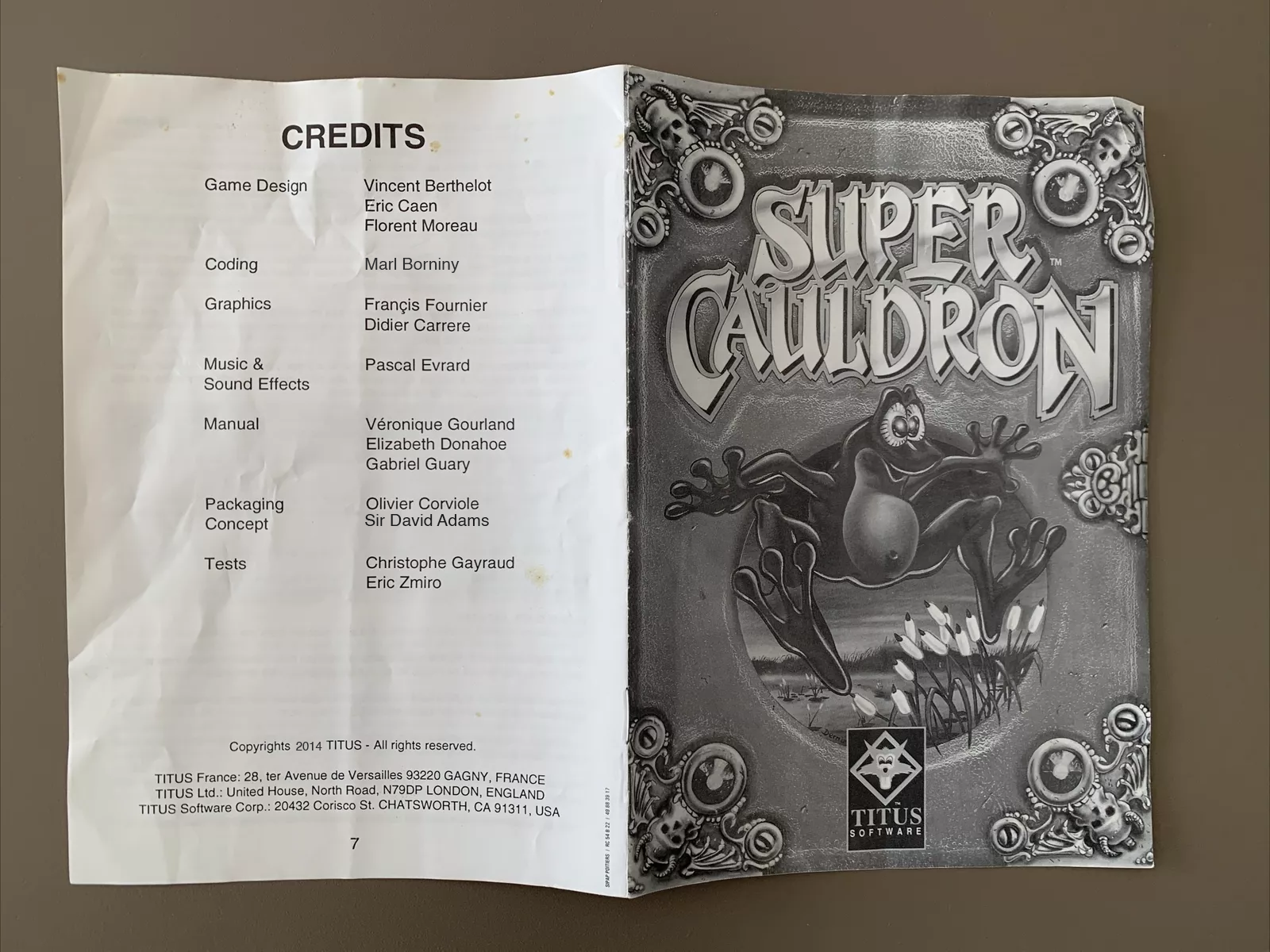

Development for Super Cauldron began in 1990 by the French software publisher Titus Software. The game took two years to complete, leading to its release in 1992. A small development team of 14 members was assembled. It was rumored that Bogosort was used in an initial build of the game. After release, no further development was performed on the game.

== Reception ==
Reviews were greatly mixed between magazine reviews of the game upon its release:

- In the July 1993 issue of CU Amiga reviewer John Mather gave it a 27%, calling a new version of the game as dull and tedious.
- Amiga Format gave it a 70% rating.
- Amiga Action gave it 63% rating.
- Amiga Computing gave it an 80% rating.
- Amiga Power gave it a 26% rating.
- The One Amiga gave it a 59% rating and then a 71% rating in an issue the next year on its budget re-release at one-third its original price.
- Amstrad Action gave it a 96% rating.
