= Prehistorik 2 =

1993 video game

- Developer: Titus France
- Publisher: Titus France
- Designer: Eric Zmiro
- Composers: Thorsten Mitschele (Game Boy, CPC)
- Platforms: Amstrad CPC, MS-DOS
- Release: 1993
- Genre: Platform
- Mode: Single-player

Prehistorik 2 is a platform game sequel to Prehistorik. It was developed by Titus Interactive for MS-DOS and Amstrad CPC and published in 1993. Like its predecessor, the main character of Prehistorik 2 is a caveman in a quest for food and who fights various animals and humorous end of level bosses.

== Gameplay ==
The player walks and jumps their way through the levels and whacks enemies in the head with a club. Points can be collected by both whacking enemies and collecting items (including food, diamonds, video games, etc.). The levels contain hidden food items which can be discovered by hitting the right spots with the club. If the player runs for a long distance and then stops, the caveman will be out of breath.

Instead of having to collect at least the right amount of food to be able to reach the next level as in Prehistorik, in Prehistorik 2 it is only required to get a lighter before the player can go to the next level. All in all, there are ten levels plus three bonus levels.

There are various hidden secrets in this game: one shows some extra credits, and there is a collection of holiday photographs of the development team.

== Legacy ==
The game was later ported to the Game Boy as Prehistorik Man. Electronic Gaming Monthly gave the Game Boy version a 6 out of 10, commenting that "the whole game becomes monotonous as it gets tired somewhat quickly". They rated the later Super NES version much better, giving it an 8.875 out of 10 and their "Game of the Month" award. They liked the game's storyline, humorous sound effects, strong play control, and numerous secrets. Famicom Tsūshin scored the Super Famicom version of Prehistorik Man a 27 out of 40.

A separate game, also titled Prehistorik Man, was released for the Super Nintendo Entertainment System. The Super NES game was in turn ported to the Game Boy Advance and the Nintendo DSi (as a DSiWare release), with the latter being released in North America in February 2010.

== Reception ==
Reception

Review score
Publication	Score
Amstrad Action	96%

== See also ==
- Titus the Fox
- Ugh!
