= Top Gun: Combat Zones =

2001 video game

- North American PlayStation 2 cover art
- Developers: Digital Integration (PS2/GameCube); Titus Interactive Studio (GBA)
- Publishers: Titus Interactive (PS2/GameCube); Mastiff (GBA)
- Series: Top Gun
- Platforms: PlayStation 2; GameCube; Windows; Game Boy Advance
- Release: October 25, 2001: PlayStation 2; NA: October 25, 2001; EU: November 16, 2001 GameCube; NA: October 28, 2002; EU: November 8, 2002 Windows; EU: April 2003 Game Boy Advance; NA: December 1, 2004
- Genre: Combat flight simulation
- Mode: Single-player

Top Gun: Combat Zones is a combat flight simulation game named after the 1986 film Top Gun. It was developed by British studio Digital Integration and published by Titus Interactive. It was originally released for the PlayStation 2 in 2001, followed by a GameCube version in 2002. Versions were also released for the Game Boy Advance and Microsoft Windows.

== Gameplay ==
Top Gun: Combat Zones is a combat flight simulation game. The game includes the main "Game" mode and the "Quick Start" mode. Game mode features 36 missions played across three eras, set respectively in Vietnam, the Gulf States, and the Arctic Circle. Several training missions take place at San Diego's Miramar base at the beginning of each era before the player moves on to live combat. The player begins with an F-14 Tomcat fighter jet. Seven additional planes are unlocked as the game progresses: F-18 Hornet, F-22 Raptor, F-4 Phantom, X-32, YF-23, Osprey, and Harrier.

There are various mission objectives, such as destroying a target, providing air support for an evacuation, or escorting allies. Each mission includes a time limit. The player's weapons include bombs, a machine gun, and several types of missiles. A map informs the player of nearby enemies, although it does not specify their altitude. The player can view the game from within the cockpit, or can choose from several exterior perspectives. Points are awarded to the player for actions such as flying close to buildings or performing certain aerial moves. In Quick Start, the player can create a customized mission with selectable settings such as the number of enemies and the playing location. The GameCube version includes "simple" and "expert" controller settings. The Game Boy Advance version features the same locations as the other versions.

== Development and release ==
In January 1999, Titus Software secured the rights to produce video games based on the 1986 film Top Gun. The game is named after the film but is not directly related. Top Gun: Combat Zones was developed by Titus' Digital Integration, and was published by Titus in October 2001, for PlayStation 2 (PS2).

Titus later released a GameCube version of Top Gun: Combat Zones. The GameCube version featured improvements over the PS2 version, including enhanced resolution and draw distance, and the addition of new control options. The GameCube version was released later in 2002.

In January 2003, Titus announced that the game would be released on Microsoft Windows. This version was released in Europe in April 2003. In late 2004, Mastiff re-released the game on PS2 and GameCube through a deal with Titus. The Game Boy Advance version, developed by Titus, was also published by Mastiff in 2004.

== Reception ==
Reception

Aggregate score
Aggregator	Score	
Aggregator	GameCube	PS2
Metacritic	59/100	63/100

Review scores
Publication	Score	
Publication	GameCube	PS2
AllGame	N/A	3/5
Electronic Gaming Monthly	N/A	4.5/10
Famitsu	29/40	28/40
Game Informer	6.75/10	7.75/10
GamePro	N/A	3.5/5
GameRevolution	N/A	D−
GameSpot	N/A	6.2/10
GameSpy	3/5	73%
GameZone	7/10	7/10
IGN	4.8/10	5.9/10
Nintendo Power	3.1/5	N/A
Official U.S. PlayStation Magazine	N/A	3/5

The GameCube and PlayStation 2 versions received mixed reviews according to the review aggregation website Metacritic. Nintendo Power gave the GameCube version a mixed review, about three months before its U.S. release date. In Japan, where both console versions were ported for release under the name Top Gun: Ace of the Sky (トップガン 〜エース オブ ザ スカイ〜, Toppu Gan 〜Ēsu obu za Sukai〜) on December 26, 2002, Famitsu gave it a score of 29 out of 40 for the GameCube version, and 28 out of 40 for the PS2 version.

Reviewers noted that aside from the title, the game has no relation to the film. Fran Mirabella III of IGN found the title misleading. Barak Tutterrow of GameSpy was surprised that Digital Integration did not take advantage of the "opportunity that the Top Gun name offers". Doug Radcliffe of GameSpot was disappointed that the game did not make more use of the Top Gun license.

Reviewers criticized the game's minimal storyline. Steve Steinberg of GameSpy said that the game contains minimal storyline. Ralph Edwards of IGN was critical of the missions, graphics and minimal story. Tutterrow was also critical to the game.

GameZone's Louis Bedigian felt that Top Gun: Combat Zones and Star Wars: Starfighter were the best flight games available for the PS2. Other critics opined that Ace Combat 04: Shattered Skies was a superior game. Tim Surette of GameZone wrote that the game is entertaining and frustrating at the same time. Edwards stated that the game lacks the fun factor. Computer and Video Games called it a "dull shoot 'em up". Critics considered the controls easy to use, but were critical of the in-game map for difficulty in locating enemies. Radcliffe criticized the presence of a time limit. GamePro wrote that the missions can become surprisingly dull and repetitive, with little tension and action. AllGame's Jon Thompson praised the game's variety, but stated that the planes largely handled the same as one another.

Some critics praised the visuals, but felt that the game did not take full advantage of the PS2's graphical capabilities. Shawn Sanders of GameRevolution was critical of the graphics, while Thompson considered them average. Some criticized the explosions for their poor graphical quality. Radcliffe considered the plane explosions unimpressive, stating that they resemble toy plane models detonated by firecrackers.

Sanders said that the sound was probably the only decent aspect of the game. Edwards praised the sound effects, but was critical of the goofy elevator music. Tutterrow also praised the sound effects, but was critical of the music. Radcliffe found the use of rock music uninspired, and GamePro was critical of the "subdued" sound effects and "cheesy" guitar riffs. Thompson considered the music average and the sound effects generic.

Some critics considered the GameCube version to be an improvement over its PS2 counterpart. Lee Skittrell of Computer and Video Games praised the improved controls and higher resolution of the GameCube version, but still found the graphics unremarkable. Skittrell also stated that the game was still lacking a "real sense of speed", writing that "surely tearing through canyons in a fighter jet should be far more exciting than this?" Skittrell believed that Star Wars: Rogue Squadron II – Rogue Leader was a superior game.

Surette praised the GameCube version for its graphics and simple controls. Mirabella described the graphics, especially at low altitude, as blurry and outdated. Steinberg had mixed feelings about the graphics of the GameCube version, stating that the game looked better while flying at high altitude. He also felt that the "simple" and "expert" control settings were too easy and too difficult respectively. Steinberg enjoyed the sound effects of the GameCube version, but described the music as "generic techno junk". Mirabella criticized the mix of "cheesy" guitar ballads and "modern techno beats". Surette considered the sound to be below average.

The game sold more than 350,000 units for the PlayStation 2.
