= Barbarian (2002 video game) =

- Developer: Saffire
- Publisher: Titus Interactive
- Platforms: PlayStation 2, GameCube, Xbox
- Release: PlayStation 2: NA: June 26, 2002; JP: April 3, 2003; EU: December 5, 2003; GameCube: JP: March 27, 2003; Xbox: EU: December 12, 2003
- Genre: Fighting game
- Modes: Single-player, multiplayer

Barbarian is a 3D fighting video game developed by Saffire, published by Titus Interactive and distributed in Europe by Avalon Interactive. The game was released in North America in 2002, and in Europe in December 2003. The Japanese title is Warrior Blade: Rastan vs. Barbarian.

== Gameplay ==
The game features 11 different fighters, each with different weapons and abilities. The player may freely destroy the environment, and use destroyed objects as weapons against their opponents. The characters each have alternate costumes, which, depending on which the player chooses, may change their default weapon. However, it does not affect the weapon's damage capabilities or uses.

The game plays much like Power Stone with its arena-style gameplay.

== Release ==
The GameCube version was originally planned for a U.S. release in late 2002 and in Europe in 2004, but was canceled while it was released in Japan in 2003.

A scaled-down version of Barbarian was originally planned for release in October 2002 on the Game Boy Advance, but was later canceled.

== Reception ==
Reception

Aggregate score
| Aggregator | Score | | |
| Aggregator | GameCube | PS2 | Xbox |
|---|---|---|---|
| Metacritic | 52/100 | 63/100 | 71/100 |

Review scores
| Publication | Score | | |
| Publication | GameCube | PS2 | Xbox |
|---|---|---|---|
| AllGame | N/A | 2.5/5 | N/A |
| Edge | N/A | 6/10 | N/A |
| Electronic Gaming Monthly | N/A | 4/10 | N/A |
| Game Informer | N/A | 6/10 | 7.25/10 |
| GamePro | N/A | 3.5/5 | N/A |
| GameSpot | N/A | 5.9/10 | N/A |
| GameSpy | N/A | 61% | N/A |
| GameZone | N/A | 5.9/10 | N/A |
| IGN | N/A | 7.8/10 | 7.4/10 |
| Nintendo Power | 3/5 | N/A | N/A |
| Official U.S. PlayStation Magazine | N/A | 2/5 | N/A |
| Official Xbox Magazine (US) | N/A | N/A | 7/10 |
| Maxim | N/A | 8/10 | N/A |

The game received "mixed reviews" on all platforms according to video game review aggregator Metacritic. Many video game websites and publications gave earlier reviews and average scores on the GameCube and Xbox versions in late 2002, months before the release dates for both of those versions were canceled in the U.S. due to mediocre reception for the PS2 version.
