= Automobili Lamborghini (video game) =

1997 video game

- North American cover art
- Developer: Titus France
- Publisher: Titus France
- Platform: Nintendo 64
- Release: NA: November 22, 1997; EU: December 1, 1997
- Genre: Racing
- Modes: Single player, multiplayer

Automobili Lamborghini is a 1997 racing video game developed and published by Titus France for the Nintendo 64. It is a successor to Lamborghini American Challenge.

In 1998, an improved version subtitled Super Speed Race 64 (スーパースピードレース64) was released in Japan only. This version was distributed by Taito, presented as a successor to the company's Speed Race series from the 1970s and early 1980s. Improvements include a new difficulty level, the ability to freely customize controls, the introduction of weather, and actual pictures of various models of Lamborghini with their names displayed before the demo screen.

== Gameplay ==
A screenshot of Automobili Lamborghini gameplay on Nintendo 64

Automobili Lamborghini is an arcade-style racing game similar to the Ridge Racer or the early Need for Speed series. There are 4 modes of play: Arcade, Championship, Single Race, and Time Trials. Arcade and Championship consist of a series of races and the ability to unlock various cars; Single Race is a practice mode in normal racing conditions, and Time Trials is a single player race against the player's best times.

To challenge these modes, the game features eight vehicles resembling real supercars: the two default cars, representing the Lamborghini Diablo and the Lamborghini Countach; and six unlockable cars won by beating the six configurations of championships, representing the Porsche 959, the Ferrari F50, the Ferrari Testarossa, the Dodge Viper, the McLaren F1, and the Bugatti EB110.

== Reception ==
Reception

Review scores
| Publication | Score |
|---|---|
| Electronic Gaming Monthly | 7.75/10 |
| EP Daily | 7/10 |
| GameSpot | 7.7/10 |
| IGN | 7/10 |
| N64 Magazine | 67% |
| Next Generation | 2/5 |

Reviews for Automobili Lamborghini ranged from mixed to positive. Critics overwhelmingly lauded its graphics and high frame rate even in four-player, split-screen races. Next Generation called it "one of the more beautiful racers in what is hands-down the most filled-out genre for the system" and GameSpot commented that "The roads and scenery are beautifully rendered and blur by so fast. It's quite an assault to your equilibrium. The illusion of g-forces is undeniable, as is the sensation of just soaring over the track."

The controls were a far more divisive issue. Though Next Generation, GameSpot, and Electronic Gaming Monthly all praised the handling as realistic, tight, and easy to learn, GamePro, IGN's Peer Schneider, and The Electric Playground's Victor Lucas contended that the controls are overly touchy and difficult to master. Some also criticized the lack of an option to change the control configuration and the lack of visible damage from collisions.

Critics highly praised the game's multiplayer mode, especially the then-rare ability to have human and A.I. opponents at the same time. John Ricciardi of Electronic Gaming Monthly said this feature made Automobili Lamborghini his "favorite N64 racer so far". By contrast, Lucas criticized the "relatively paper thin gameplay", bland colors, and "intolerably stupid" computer opponent. He said that the game should have included more cars and tracks, and criticized the sound effects: "These are sports cars of magnitude. The hums, whines and purrs of these particular 'mobiles should not be taken lightly. However, there are times when it sounds like this is a race of turbo-charged hand blenders." GamePro complained at the lack of a reverse gear but found the ability to use both the Rumble Pak and Controller Pak innovative. The reviewer concluded the game to be flawed and lacking in originality, and recommended players instead get San Francisco Rush: Extreme Racing. Though praising almost every aspect of the game, Next Generation concluded that "It really needs a better sense of speed and more tension, or at least some unique element besides its dream-car license to set it apart. AL64 makes a decent rental, but even at Nintendo's recently lowered prices, it's no steal." However, a majority of reviewers praised the game's sense of speed. Schneider assessed that "although there are a few obvious faults in the game, this sequel to the Euro-hit Lamborghini American Challenge for the Super NES does a decent job at bringing street racing home."

The game sold more than 500,000 units.
