= Lamborghini American Challenge =

- Super NES North American cover art
- Developer: Titus France
- Publisher: Titus France
- Composers: Richard Hooper (Amiga); Frederic Prados (SNES); Thorsten Mitschele (Game Boy)
- Platforms: Amiga, Amstrad CPC, Atari ST, Commodore 64, MS-DOS, Super NES, Amiga CD32, Game Boy
- Release: 1992; 1993 (SNES); 1994 (CD32, GB)
- Genre: Racing
- Modes: Single-player, multiplayer

Lamborghini American Challenge (originally released as Crazy Cars III) is a 1992 racing video game developed and published by Titus France for the Amiga, Amstrad CPC, Atari ST, Commodore 64, MS-DOS, Super NES, Amiga CD32, and Game Boy.

The game is essentially an upgrade from Titus's previous entry in the Crazy Cars franchise, Crazy Cars III. It adds a two-player mode, a few more options, and a jazz fusion soundtrack. It also changes the scoring system and gives the player a possibility to save progress every 5 races (instead after Division Challenge only). The night goggles item is no longer available for purchase (except in the SNES version) and the car no longer bounces to the top of the screen after driving through slopes at high speeds. In Amiga version introduction was cut out and MS-DOS version does not support EGA anymore.

== Gameplay ==
The objective of this game is to end up the undisputed champion of highly illegal street racing throughout the entire United States. To do so, the player must race against a group of computer-controlled opponents in a variety of illegal races across the country. The races are divided into three leagues, each one with increasingly harder opponents, and the player needs to regularly upgrade their Lamborghini Diablo in order to keep them above the other racers, by using the American currency from bets as well as the bonuses earned by succeeding in the races in first place.

The races themselves take place in a variety of scenarios (mountain roads, the desert, urban settings) and they include weather conditions such as rain and snow. At the end of each league, and in order to be able to join the next one, the player has to go through a "challenge", consisting of a timed race in a highway infested with trucks.

== Reception ==
Amiga and PC

Review scores
Publication	Score
Computer Gaming World	3/4 (PC)
Computer Player	5/10 (PC)
Electronic Games	B- (PC)
Zero	88/100 (Amiga)

Nintendo consoles

Review scores
Publication	Score
GamePro	3.38/5 (GB) (Note: GamePro scored Lamborghini American Challenge 3/5 two times for graphics and sound, 3.5/5 for fun factor, and 4/5 for control.)
GB Action	86% (GB)
NMS	39/100 (GB); 64/100 (SNES)
Nintendo Power	2.98/5 (SNES) (Note: Nintendo Power served Lamborghini American Challenge two 2.8/5 ratings for graphics/sound and challenge, a 3.1/5 for play control, and a 3.2/5 for theme/fun.)
SNES Force	70/100 (SNES)
Super Play	73% (SNES)
Super Pro	80/100 (SNES)

Tony Dillon of CU Amiga gave the Amiga version an 88 percent rating. He called the game not smooth as Lotus, fast as F1 or playable as Jaguar, but still as competent title. Computer Gaming World gave the game three stars out of five.

The game sold more than 290,000 units.

== Peripherals ==
The Super NES version supports the Super NES Mouse and Super Scope. When the game is played with either accessory, the player can access a different game mode in which it is possible to destroy the opponent by shooting them (the original bet mode is not present). The infamous saving system from computer versions is also substituted by a password system.

== See also ==
- Automobili Lamborghini (video game)
