= Exhibition of Speed =

2001 video game

- Developer: Player 1
- Publisher: Titus Interactive
- Platform: Dreamcast
- Release: EU: May 18, 2001
- Genre: Racing
- Modes: Single-player, multiplayer

Exhibition of Speed is a racing game developed by Player 1 and published by Titus Interactive for the Dreamcast in 2001.

== Gameplay ==
The game offers Trophy (consisting of three championships), Quick Race, Time Trial and Multiplayer modes. Over 20 vehicles and 15 tracks are included, with varying weather conditions across tracks.

== Development ==
The title is a follow-up to Roadsters, released on the Nintendo 64 in 1999, and for PlayStation, Dreamcast and Game Boy Color in 2000.

== Reception ==
The title was reviewed poorly, with critics pointing to a lack of variety among game modes, rubber banding and poor vehicle handling. Steve Key, writing in Official Dreamcast Magazine, rated it a 2/10. Dreamcast Magazine's Alex Warren decried the game's "distressingly poor graphical quality", "disturbingly bad frame rate", "particularly foul draw-distance" and "equally abominable gameplay", giving a score of 35/100. Martin Woger, the Editor-in-Chief of Eurogamer.de, placed Exhibition of Speed in second place in his list of the seven worst Dreamcast games of all time.
