= Rival Realms =

1998 video game

- Developer: Activ Pub Studios
- Publishers: EU: Digital Integration; NA: Titus Interactive
- Platform: Microsoft Windows
- Release: EU: December 4, 1998; NA: 1999
- Genre: Strategy video game
- Modes: Single player, multiplayer

Rival Realms is a strategy video game developed by Activ Pub Studios for Microsoft Windows in 1998–1999.

== Reception ==
Reception

Aggregate score
Aggregator	Score
GameRankings	62%

Review scores
Publication	Score
AllGame	3/5
GamePro	3.5/5
GameStar	42%
PC Accelerator	1/10
PC Gamer (UK)	79%
PC Games (DE)	74%
PC Zone	70%

The game received mixed reviews according to the review aggregation website GameRankings.
