= Virtual Kasparov =

2001 video game

- Developer: Titus Interactive Studio
- Publisher: Titus Interactive
- Platforms: PlayStation, Game Boy Advance
- Release: PlayStation: PAL: April 27, 2001; NA: August 15, 2001; Game Boy Advance: PAL: February 22, 2002; NA: April 5, 2002
- Genre: Chess
- Modes: Single player, multiplayer

Virtual Kasparov is a chess video game developed by Titus Interactive Studio, published by Titus Interactive and distributed in Europe by Virgin Interactive for the PlayStation and Game Boy Advance. Game can be played against beginners, novices, champions, or personality players. Games that Garry Kasparov played during his career, as well as interviews about his chess career, can be viewed in the game.

== Game Boy Advance version ==
The main mode of the Game Boy Advance is the story mode. The player starts with two continents to play on, Africa and the Americas. After four players on one continent are beaten, a fifth opponent is unlocked. When four players from both Africa and the Americas are defeated, two new continents are unlocked Asia (sans Russia) and Europe (sans Russia). Once four players from both Asia and Europe are defeated the player is granted access to the subcontinent of Russia. There are a total of 31 opponents in Virtual Kasparov. Opponents are of various ages, backgrounds, experience levels, and geographic locations. Every opponent has a short backstory in story mode.

== Critical reaction ==
Reception

Aggregate scores
Aggregator	Score	
Aggregator	GBA	PS
GameRankings	69%	65%
Metacritic	70/100	N/A

Review scores
Publication	Score	
Publication	GBA	PS
4Players	N/A	59%
AllGame	4/5	4/5
Game Informer	N/A	7.75/10
GamesMaster	90%	N/A
IGN	6.5/10	N/A
Jeuxvideo.com	15/20	N/A
Nintendo Power	3.7/5	N/A
Official U.S. PlayStation Magazine	N/A	2/5

The Game Boy Advance version received "average" reviews according to the review aggregation website Metacritic. Steve Butts of IGN said the same handheld version "suffer[s] from some considerable shortcomings, most notably in the area of presentation. The AI is still good enough to make the game enjoyable and challenging, but the lack of some key features leaves you feeling somewhat unsatisfied."

Will Grigoratos of PlayStation Illustrated was pleased with the PlayStation version's 2D graphics, but felt the "3D mode leaves a lot to be desired." Grigoratos called the tutorial for chess beginners "excellent", but concluded the game to ultimately be "a run-of-the-mill chess game, with a few neat frills".
