= Stunt GP =

2001 video game

- Developer: Team17
- Publishers: Eon Digital Entertainment (PC and Dreamcast); Titus Interactive (PlayStation 2)
- Designers: Pete Opdam; Karl Morton; Danny Burke
- Composers: Bjørn Lynne; Marc Pattison
- Engine: RenderWare
- Platforms: Windows, Dreamcast, PlayStation 2
- Release: 6 April 2001: Windows; EU: 6 April 2001 Dreamcast; EU: 8 June 2001 PlayStation 2; NA: 12 November 2001; EU: 30 November 2001
- Genre: Racing
- Modes: Single-player, multiplayer

Stunt GP is a radio-controlled car racing video game developed by the UK-based studio Team17, released in 2001. It was published by Eon Digital Entertainment for Windows and Dreamcast, and by Titus Interactive for PlayStation 2. Stunt GP uses the RenderWare engine. It has both single-player and offline multiplayer game modes using the split-screen method, and various game controllers are supported.

== Game modes ==
The game features five game modes named Arcade, Exhibition, Time Trial, Stunt Challenge and Championship.

Arcade mode allows the player to unlock new content for the game, such as cars and tracks. In Exhibition mode, the player can choose its car, track, the number of AI as well as other settings. Time Trial mode allows the player to beat records on a restricted list of tracks. Stunt Challenge mode lets the player score a maximum number of aerials in a stunt arena. Finally Championship mode consists of a full season of 20 races in which the player will be able to gradually improve the car and its components.

== Gameplay ==
=== Mechanics ===
The radio-controlled car is played in third-person using the arrow keys. The cars are powered with a battery which slowly loses energy over time. Once the battery has run out of energy, the car goes slower and thus the player is severely handicapped. Several game mechanics interacts with the battery level. Near the finish line of each track lies a pit-stop, in which the player can refill the batteries. A speed boost is available by pressing the Control key but it depletes the battery much faster than usual. Stunts are performed while the player is in the air by pressing the Shift key and one of the arrow key. If the stunt is successful, some amount of energy will be restored.

=== Cars ===
There are 20 cars in the game, upon which only 6 are initially available. The others can be unlock by playing modes like Arcade, Time Trial and Championship. They are divided into 4 categories:

Wild Wheels are cars with a solid grip to the road. They are represented by heavy vehicles such as trucks or 4x4. Aero Blasters are vehicles with amazing agility. They spin the fastest while attempting aerials. Their design is futuristic. Speed Demons are cars with the strongest accelerations and top speed. Their lines are sharp and aerodynamic. Team Specials is a special category regrouping eccentric vehicles such as an open-wheel car or a forklift.

In Championship mode, every car can be tweaked extensively, from tyres to engines, suspensions, brakes, batteries, etc.

== Development ==
The game was announced by Team17 and Hasbro Interactive in November 1999 for a March 2000 release and would be released under Hasbro's Atari Interactive brand. In 2000, Infogrames North America secured North American publishing rights to the title in March with a Fall release window, while Titus Interactive secured worldwide publishing rights to the PlayStation 2 version of the game in July, with Virgin Interactive handling distribution.

Following the purchase of Hasbro Interactive by Infogrames in January 2001, the company dropped out of publishing the title due to the game's numerous delays and that the current release window no longer fit in the publisher's existing releases for the beginning of the year. In March, EON Digital Entertainment picked up the publishing rights to the PC and Dreamcast versions.

== Reception ==
Reception

Aggregate scores
Aggregator	Score	
Aggregator	PC	PS2
GameRankings	34%	53%
Metacritic	N/A	49/100

Review scores
Publication	Score	
Publication	PC	PS2
AllGame	N/A	2.5/5
Eurogamer	7/10	N/A
Famitsu	N/A	29/40
Game Informer	N/A	4/10
GamesMaster	N/A	38%
GameSpot	N/A	5/10
GameZone	N/A	5/10
IGN	N/A	5/10
PlayStation Official Magazine – UK	N/A	3/10
PC Zone	34%	N/A

The PlayStation 2 version received "generally unfavorable reviews" according to the review aggregation website Metacritic. In Japan, where the same console version was ported for release on 11 April 2002, Famitsu gave it a score of 29 out of 40.
