= The Blues Brothers (video game) =

1991 video game

- Intro screen of the Blues Brothers video game in IBM PC (VGA mode)
- Developer: Titus France
- Publisher: Titus France
- Platforms: MS-DOS, Amstrad CPC, Amiga, C64, Atari ST, NES, Game Boy
- Release: 1991: MS-DOS, Amiga, C64, Atari ST; 1992: Amstrad CPC, GB; September 1992: NES
- Genre: Platform
- Modes: Single-player, multiplayer

Initial reviews (Nintendo consoles)

Review scores
Publication	Score
Electronic Gaming Monthly	5.5/10 (NES) (Note: In Electronic Gaming Monthly's review of the NES version, two critics gave it a 6/10 and two others a 5/10.)
Game Players	3/10 (NES)
GamePro	2.75/5 (NES) (Note: GamePro gave the NES version two 2/5 scores for control and fun factor, a 3/5 for sound, and a 4/5 for graphics.)
GameZone	80/100 (GB)
Official Nintendo Magazine	40/100 (NES)
Total!	74% (GB); 30% (NES)
VideoGames & Computer Entertainment	4/10 (NES)
GB Action	91% (GB)
N-Force	81% (GB & NES)

Initial reviews (other consoles)

Review scores
Publication	Score
Amiga Power	87% (Amiga)
Amstrad Action	95% (CPC)
Commodore Format	90% (C64)
Commodore Power	93% (C64)
Games-X	4.5/5 (Amiga, MS-DOS & ST)
New Computer Express	5/5 (ST & Amiga)
The One	91% (Amiga)
ST Format	72% (ST)
Zzap!64	91% (C64)

Award
Publication	Award
Amstrad Action	Mastergame

The Blues Brothers is a platform game based on the band The Blues Brothers, where the object is to evade police and other vigilantes to get to a blues concert. The game was released for IBM PC, Amstrad CPC, Amiga, Commodore 64, and Atari ST in 1991, and for the NES and Game Boy in 1992. It was created by Titus France. A sequel, The Blues Brothers: Jukebox Adventure, was released for the SNES in 1993 (as The Blues Brothers) and for IBM PC compatibles and the Game Boy in 1994. The theme music of the video game is an electronic arrangement of Peter Gunn. Zzap!64 ranked the Commodore 64 port the eighth-best all-time Commodore 64 game in 1993, and the game was the best platformer for PC, Atari ST and Amiga consoles of 1991 of Zero journalist David Wilson.

== Gameplay ==
The characters have the ability to pick up boxes to throw them at enemies. Each level is a variation on the jumping theme, with the characters finding a necessary attribute (e.g. a guitar) somewhere in the level. The sixth and final level ends on-stage.

The game can be played by two players simultaneously, but the scrolling screen only focuses on one of them.

The game's soundtrack consists of music from the movie. Dimitris Yerasimos composed the music for all versions of the game except for the Game Boy, where Thorsten Mitschele composed the music.
