= Incantation (video game) =

1996 video game

- North American cover art
- Developer: Titus France
- Publisher: Titus France
- Platform: Super Nintendo Entertainment System
- Release: NA: December 1996; EU: 1996
- Genre: Platform
- Mode: Single-player

Incantation is a 1996 platform video game developed and published by Titus France for the Super Nintendo Entertainment System.

== Gameplay ==
The main character is attacking a purple monster with his magic spell.

The player controls a young wizard who has to complete several levels. Enemies are defeated by using different ranged spells that can be found throughout the levels, with different firing patterns and power. Some levels require players to pick up a certain amount of items while other have a boss battle.

== Reception ==
Reception

Review scores
Publication	Score
M! Games	62%
Mega Fun	67%
Official Nintendo Magazine	78/100
Player One	77%
Superjuegos	79/100
Super Game Power	4/5
Total!	3+
Nintendo Acción	79/100
Power Unlimited	43/100
Ultra Player	2/6

Incantation received average reviews. Electronic Gaming Monthly highlighted the colorful graphics, but deemed the game suitable for young children due to it being too easy. GamePro's Captain Squideo wrote that "The sound effects and weak music add little, and the graphics are cartoony. We need new 16-bit titles, but Incantation isn't one you'll remember long".
