= RoboCop (2003 video game) =

- European Xbox cover art
- Developer: Titus Interactive Studio
- Publisher: Titus Interactive
- Series: RoboCop
- Engine: RenderWare
- Platforms: GameCube; Windows; PlayStation 2 Xbox
- Release: Windows: DEU/FRA: April 30, 2003; UK: May 2003; PlayStation 2: JP: July 2003; UK: 2003/2004; Xbox: NA: July 29, 2003; PAL: 2003/2004; GameCube: JP: March 4, 2004
- Genre: First-person shooter
- Mode: Single-player

RoboCop is a first-person shooter video game based on the RoboCop films. It was developed and published by French company Titus Interactive, which acquired the rights to produce RoboCop video games in 1999. After several schedule changes, the game was released in 2003 for Microsoft Windows, PlayStation 2, and Xbox, with the European versions distributed through Avalon Interactive. A GameCube version was released in Japan in 2004, under the title RoboCop: Aratanaru Kiki (English: RoboCop: New Crisis). According to Metacritic, the Xbox version, the only one to be released in North America, received "unfavorable" reviews.

== Gameplay ==
RoboCop is a first-person shooter based on the RoboCop films. In the game, RoboCop, a cyborg police officer in Neo Detroit, is tasked with finding the people responsible for the spread of a new designer drug known as Brain Drain. Simultaneously, RoboCop is tasked with investigating connections between a mayoral candidate, Omni Consumer Products (the creator of RoboCop), and Brain Drain.

The game features nine large levels, each one divided into several sections. The player's progress is saved after the completion of each level. If the player is killed, then the level is restarted from the beginning. Each level consists of one primary objective and several secondary and bonus objectives. The player must complete the primary objective to advance through the game, while the other objectives add to the player's final score. RoboCop can use several weapons against enemies, including a pistol, a machine gun, a grenade launcher, and a missile launcher. RoboCop can also rescue civilians being held as hostages and can arrest enemies who surrender.

== Development and release ==
In June 1999, Titus Interactive announced they had acquired the rights to develop and publish video games based on RoboCop from Metro-Goldwyn-Mayer. The license included all video game systems, including the Dreamcast, Nintendo 64, PlayStation, and PlayStation 2. The game that was announced would be a first-person-shooter developed by Xatrix Entertainment and would be released in late 2000. This incarnation of the video game, which was meant for the PlayStation 2 was eventually reworked.

In April 2001, Titus showcased the title, with fellow-rival French company Infogrames now applied as developer for the game with a release date in November. Once again, nothing came through of this incarnation of the game either.

By 2002, Titus Interactive's in-house development studio Titus Interactive Studio became the game's developer. By May 2002, the PS2 version remained in development and was known as RoboCop: The Future of Law Enforcement, with an expected release that October. The game includes an original story based on the RoboCop films. Once again, the game missed this date and the PS2 version's North American release, alongside a release for the GameCube version were scrapped altogether when Titus decided to focus exclusively on the Xbox version of the game. In November 2002, Titus Software Corporation announced that the game would be released in February 2003. By the following month, the Xbox version had been scheduled for release in April 2003, then a July 2003 release After that, the game was finally released after years of development trouble.

In Europe, Titus Interactive released a Microsoft Windows version in April 2003, with the scrapped but completed PlayStation 2 version being released later on. In Japan, Titus Japan K.K. released the PlayStation 2 version in July 2003, while the scrapped GameCube version was released on March 4, 2004, under the title RoboCop: Aratanaru Kiki (translated as RoboCop: New Crisis in English).

== Reception ==
Reception

Aggregate scores
Aggregator	Score
GameRankings	XBOX: 41%
Metacritic	XBOX: 30/100

Review scores
Publication	Score
AllGame	2/5
Electronic Gaming Monthly	2.67/10
Famitsu	26/40
Game Informer	3.5/10
GameSpot	2.2/10
GameZone	7.3/10
PlayStation Official Magazine – UK	2/10
Official Xbox Magazine (UK)	5.9/10
PC Gamer (UK)	22%
TeamXbox	5.2/10
PC Games	42%

The Xbox version received "unfavorable" reviews according to the review aggregation website Metacritic. The Xbox game was particularly criticized for its lack of an in-level save option. The Swedish magazine Gamereactor called the Xbox version "the worst videogame since Superman 64" (also from Titus Software).

Alex Navarro of GameSpot criticized the sound and graphics, the game's difficulty, slow player movements, a poor targeting system, poor controls, and the abundance of enemies, as well as the lack of objects to hide behind. Navarro further noted the limited amount of player ammo and the large amount of ammo needed to kill each enemy. Scott Alan Marriott of AllGame noted the "realistic, gritty environment that offers some limited interaction" and stated that "the look and feel" of the RoboCop films "are well captured". However, he criticized the slow cursor-based targeting system, stating that while it works in the RoboCop films "for dramatic effect", it "is downright dangerous in a game" with an abundance of enemy gunfire. Marriott also criticized the repetitive music and noted RoboCop's slow movements as being realistic to the films but frustrating to play.

Ben Lawrence of Official Xbox Magazine criticized the game as repetitive and frustrating, and noted the limited weapons and their ineffectiveness against enemies. Electronic Gaming Monthly criticized the Xbox version for its graphics, repetitive mission objectives, and poor artificial intelligence. Game Informer noted that the game included authentic elements from the films but that such details did not improve the gameplay, stating that the game "pretty much fails on every conceivable front and can't hold a candle to 99 percent of the games currently in the Xbox library". TeamXbox considered the game repetitive and its storyline "rather uninteresting" and noted that the graphics and sound were average.
