= Knight Force =

1989 video game

- Developer: Titus France
- Publisher: Titus France
- Platforms: Amstrad CPC, Atari ST, Amiga, IBM PC, ZX Spectrum
- Release: 1989

Knight Force is a video game developed by Titus France for the Amstrad CPC, Atari ST, Amiga, IBM PC compatibles, and the ZX Spectrum. It was published in 1989.

== Plot ==
Knight Force is a game in which the player is a champion who will need to go to five different time periods to defeat an evil magician and rescue the princess he has captured. The player must defeat a number of enemies in each time zone to retrieve the amulet for that zone, and kill a clones of the magician in each zone to defeat the true conjurer.

== Reception ==
The game was reviewed in 1990 in Dragon #157 by Hartley, Patricia, and Kirk Lesser in "The Role of Computers" column. The reviewers gave the game 1 out of 5 stars.
