= Titan (1988 video game) =

1988 video game

- ZX Spectrum cover art
- Developer: Titus France
- Publisher: Titus France
- Platforms: Amiga, Amstrad CPC, Atari ST, Commodore 64, MS-DOS, Famicom, FM Towns, PC Engine, ZX Spectrum
- Release: 1988
- Genre: Breakout clone
- Mode: Single-player

Titan is a 1988 block breaker video game developed and published by Titus France.. It was converted to the Famicom in 1990 by SOFEL, before Naxat Soft then converted the game for the PC Engine in 1991.

== Story ==
Titan is set in the year 2114 in Vegapolis. Professor Hybrys, creates a new sport called Titan, in which players guide a black ball through a series of 80 labyrinths using a movable square. In each labyrinth, the player must either direct the ball to an exit or destroy all destructible blocks. A prize of 1,000 kronurs is offered to anyone who can complete the Hybrys' game.

== Gameplay ==
Titan takes the Breakout concept and adds another dimension by allowing the object the player controls to be able to move on the Y-axis in addition to the old X-axis, making for a comprehensive top-down puzzle game. The display follows a small rectangle controlled by the player as it moves on a map. The player moves around a ball slightly smaller than the rectangle, trying to hit blocks to destroy them. The player must also avoid hazardous objects that will kill the ball if they touch.

== Reception ==
Reception

Review scores
Publication	Score
Crash	69%
Your Sinclair	75/100

Titan was widely considered visually impressive and fast-paced, but difficult and somewhat repetitive by critics. The basic Breakout-like concept was recognizable, but the game expanded it substantially: instead of simply clearing a screen, the player had to guide the powerball through a large number of increasingly challenging levels while dealing with scrolling environments and hazards. The speed was one of its defining characteristics—something that could make the game exciting but also make it difficult to control. Titan received mixed reviews from critics. Crash Magazine rated Titan a 69%, and Your Sinclair gave the game a 75/100.
