= Xena: Warrior Princess (video game) =

1999 video game

- Developers: Universal Studios Digital Arts (PS); Titus Interactive Studio (GBC)
- Publishers: PlayStation; Electronic Arts; Universal Interactive Studios; Game Boy Color; Titus Interactive
- Director: Roger Hector (PlayStation)
- Producers: Gary Stark (PlayStation); Karine Cohen-Solal (Game Boy Color)
- Programmers: Dennis Koble (PlayStation); Hervé Trisson (Game Boy Color)
- Artist: Mark Franklin (PlayStation)
- Composers: Bill Brown (PlayStation); Mike Reagan (PlayStation); Jean-Marie Philibert (Game Boy Color)
- Platforms: PlayStation; Game Boy Color
- Release: PlayStation: NA: October 5, 1999; Game Boy Color: NA: July 30, 2001
- Genre: Hack and slash
- Mode: Single-player

Xena: Warrior Princess is a hack and slash video game developed by Universal Studios Digital Arts and co-published by Electronic Arts and Universal Interactive Studios for the PlayStation in 1999. A Game Boy Color version was developed and published by Titus Interactive in 2001. Each version is based on the television series of the same name, which aired from 1995 to 2001.

== Plot ==
The Game begins with Xena and Gabrielle walking down a road and Gabrielle telling Xena a joke. Xena decided to go travel alone to visit an old friend in Oebalus; as she approaches, she notices black smoke rising where the village would be. When she arrives in Oebalus, she finds her friend dying and she is told that "they are looking for her", referring to Gabrielle. Xena goes into the village, rescues the remaining hostages, and finds the Pirate King Pactolus. After his defeat, he informs her that King Valerian paid him and his men to distract her while Valerian's soldiers capture Gabrielle on the road.

Xena then travels to the Isle of Kronos to find Valerian, but is stopped on the beach by a Cyclops. Upon its defeat, she also fights Valerian's soldiers and defeats a troll in order to cross a bridge. When she finally enters the Castle, the King comes out with two bodyguards. After killing them, Xena asks Valerian about Gabrielle and why she was taken. Valerian replies that Gabrielle has been chosen for a very special ceremony and that her human sacrifice would help usher in a new world order. The king transforms into a Minotaur and runs into the labyrinth of the castle with Xena hot in close pursuit. In the labyrinth Xena, finds Gabrielle and kills the Minotaur. Reunited, Gabrielle tells her that she heard the King mention a band of Amazons. They decide to visit them in order to get some answers.

When they arrived in the Amazon village, the Amazons attack them on sight. They search for the Amazon Queen in the Lost Temple; however, a hidden group of Amazons kidnapped Gabrielle and lock Xena inside. As a result, Xena must go alone to find the Amazon Queen. Upon finding her, she informs Xena that they want an Amazon Queen to be sacrificed in order to create a new world. Gabrielle, being an Amazon Queen herself, will take her place. Xena kills the Queen and comes face to face with the main antagonist, Kalabrax, an angry Goddess who seek revenge from Gods by trying to create a world where she will be in control. Kalabrax tells Xena that she is going to sacrifice Gabrielle. In order to get Xena out of the way, she opens the earth and casts Xena down to Tartarus.

The only way to get out of the underworld is to find Hades himself. On the road to Hades' Castle, she has to overcome the traps of Charon, face the zombies coming from the ground, the undead boatman, and the Well of Lost Souls. When she arrives in the castle, Hades welcomes Xena and she asks his permission to send her back to the surface world to stop Kalabrax.

Hades sends Xena to the Village of Tir' Na to find to the Lyre of Orpheus, a key that will help Xena to unlock a Gate that leads to Kalabrax's Temple. However, in the village of Tir' Na, Kalabrax already sent soldiers to seek the Lyre. They have taken the Seer Fei as hostage. Xena kills his captors and rescues the Seer who, in turn, guides her to the druid Yat. She follows Yat to the Temple where a fight ensues, but Xena turns the symbols against him so he dies. Fei thanks Xena for saving him and the Village of Tir' Na; as a reward, he gives her the Lyre of Orpheus.

Finally, Xena travels through the mountains to find the Temple of Kalabrax. The last obstacles she has to overcome are the Three Serpent Sisters and the Ogre Protectors. In defeating the ogres, she completes a puzzle regarding chimes and the order they raise in. After working her way through each of the five Ogres and the odd harpy, she strikes the chimes in the correct order, plays the lyre, and opens the portal.

Xena is transported to the Temple of Pinnacles and found Gabrielle tied to the altar, arriving just before Gabrielle was to sacrificed. Xena fights and kills the two guards and Kalabrax. As she walks to the altar to release Gabrielle, Kalabrax transforms into a beast. In order to truly defeat Kalabrax, Xena makes him run into the supports of the ceiling, smashing them such that the Temple begins to collapse on top of him.

After this last battle, Xena finally reunites with Gabrielle and they embrace each other. After a while, Gabrielle suggests to Xena that they create a game based on the adventure they lived.

== Gameplay ==
=== PlayStation version ===
The PlayStation version of Xena: Warrior Princess is played from a third-person perspective and consists of linear hack and slash and action gameplay, with some platform-jumping and puzzle-solving sections. The game's story involves the evil sorceress Kalabrax, who escapes after centuries of imprisonment and plots revenge against the world, and against the gods who imprisoned her. She must sacrifice a queen for her spell to gain maximum power. With help from her allies, Kalabrax captures Gabrielle, the Queen of the Amazons. Xena, the warrior princess, embarks on a journey to rescue Gabrielle, while facing various villains along the way.

The player controls Xena, who must defeat all enemies and complete tasks to proceed through each level of the game. Xena can carry out numerous attacks through a combination of button commands performed by the player. If the attack is executed successfully, Xena lets out her signature warrior scream. Xena can run, jump, kick, slash, and block enemy attacks, as well as perform groin kicks and cartwheels.

The player can also use power-ups found throughout the game. Power-ups can replenish the player's health, as well as provide armor upgrades or additional attack abilities. The player can also use Xena's chakram, a weapon featured on the television series. The chakram can be used against enemies, as well as cutting chains and flipping switches. Optionally, the player can also steer the chakram while it is in mid-air, for a better chance of hitting a target. Xena can also use a sword. Both weapons can be upgraded by collecting power-ups. The player can only attack one enemy at a time, and is defenseless against nearby enemies while the chakram is in use.

The game features 21 levels. Early levels, and some of the later levels, include tasks in which Xena must rescue hostages by using a long-distance attack against the enemies. If the player merely beats up an enemy rather than kill it, karma is added to Xena's karma meter. When the karma meter becomes full, the player receives temporary invincibility. Defeating boss enemies typically requires the player to perform certain actions, as Xena's weapons do not have any effect on some of them. Scrolls found on various levels provide the player with hints, such as information on how to defeat boss enemies.

=== Game Boy Color version ===
The Game Boy Color version is a side-scrolling platform action game played primarily from an overhead perspective. The game's story focuses on Xena, who is stuck in a dream world known as Psychosia and must locate Darphus, who is responsible for trapping her there. Xena must also locate Morpheus, who is the only one with the power to send her back to reality.

The player controls Xena, who can run, jump, climb, and swim. Xena can also use items such as maple syrup and keys. A total of 13 items can be found throughout the game, and are stored in an inventory screen. The player can equip up to two items. Xena's health is represented by hearts. Health can be increased by finding heart containers throughout the game. The game features 16 levels. The game can be linked up with Hercules: The Legendary Journeys, allowing the player to play as Hercules, who is capable of accessing secret levels.

== Development and release ==
=== Playstation version ===
Universal Interactive Studios and its development house, Universal Digital Arts, developed the PlayStation version. Universal created several new characters specifically for the game, including Kalabrax and the Amazon Bird Women. Universal also created over 100 different animations for the character of Xena to ensure smooth movements in the game. In addition, the faces of the television show's actresses, Lucy Lawless (Xena) and Renee O'Connor (Gabrielle), were texture-mapped into the game. In August 1998, the game's publishing rights were secured by 989 Studios. 989 reported delays for publishing the game. In May 1999 during the E3 convention, the rights for publishing the game were transferred to Electronic Arts.

The PlayStation version was published in North America by Electronic Arts on October 5, 1999, following the premiere of the television show's fifth season.

=== Gameboy version ===
In November 1998, Titus Interactive announced that it had acquired the rights to produce video games based on the television show. In May 2000, Titus announced that a Game Boy Color version of Xena: Warrior Princess was scheduled for release at the end of summer 2000. The Game Boy Color version, developed and published by Titus, was ultimately released on July 30, 2001.

== Reception ==
Reception

Aggregate score
Aggregator	Score	
Aggregator	GBC	PS
GameRankings	N/A	66%

Review scores
Publication	Score	
Publication	GBC	PS
AllGame	N/A	3/5
Computer and Video Games	2/5	N/A
EP Daily	N/A	7/10
GameSpot	N/A	4.6/10
IGN	N/A	6.5/10
Next Generation	N/A	4/5
Nintendo Power	3/5	N/A
The Sydney Morning Herald	N/A	3.5 of 5

Official U.S. PlayStation Magazine rated the PlayStation version 3.5 out of 5, while Nintendo Power rated the Game Boy Color version a 3 out of 5.

Joe Fielder of GameSpot gave the PlayStation version a rating of 4.6 out of 10, and criticized the fact that Xena is defenseless while using her chakram weapon. Fielder also noted that the game's characters "all look very blocky, and the backgrounds are basic and sparse." Fielder said the game's platform-jumping and puzzle-solving sections were not fun because of the game's poor camera system: "The camera has a mind of its own at times, swinging this way and that in some situations while taking too long to catch up to your character in others. On top of that, the controls that let you adjust the camera manually feel backward and the perspective shifts too slowly to be much use in tough situations. [...] You'll fly easily through this title if you can find the motivation to attempt it, the hardest tasks being those set by working with the camera." Fielder ultimately concluded that the game "feels as though its developers were focused so intently on making the title carry mass appeal that in the end, the result is a watered-down, thin, sorry state of a game barely deserving of a rental, let alone a purchase. Like Xena? Stick to the TV show and put this one out to pasture."

Dean Austin of IGN rated the PlayStation version a 6.5 out of 10 and noted its outdated graphics, but praised its design and the pacing of its music, as well as the chakram, calling it "by far the most innovative part of the game." Austin also wrote, "The levels are involved but not particularly deep and the overall time of play is an issue. Only Xena could have so much skin exposed running around in snow covered mountain levels. [...] It's a shame that Gabrielle was not used more as a base character. A game that featured two-player co-operative play controlling both Xena and Gabrielle would have been most welcome." Austin also complained of "warping and camera clipping problems that occur throughout the game. These two problems impact gameplay at inopportune times (not to mention the excessive pop-up)."

Jason White of AllGame gave the PlayStation version 3 stars out of 5 and wrote, "The characters and bosses are average as far as appearance goes and the game itself isn't very inventive. Hardcore gamers will find this okay to rent but most diehard Xena fans will love this game." White noted that the "gameplay is extremely basic. While you can wander anywhere on the screen, the game itself is a strict linear adventure. If you don't beat all the enemies nor complete whatever task is asked of you, then you can't move on. Xena walks along a paved path throughout the adventure, sort of 'yellow brick road-ish.' You walk down the path, fight the bad guys, get a key and go through a gate. This is pretty much how the game plays the whole time. There are painfully long load times between levels. A bit of slow down occurs when Xena fights too many enemies at once which lets one or two of them get in a free shot while you're left trying to face them." White also wrote, "There are only two real down sides to the game. There are so many moves to use that you need a few extra fingers to press all the buttons so you can see all her moves. [...] The other is that in order to perform simple tasks like jumping, you need to use a certain button combination, otherwise you'll end up going past or coming up just short of your mark. The one thing missing is that you can only attack one enemy at a time, very un-Xena like."

Jules Grant of The Electric Playground gave the game a 7 out of 10 and wrote that it "accurately recreates the atmosphere of the television series and uses some of the same characters. [...] This game is always fast and furious and the environments, particularly the outdoor areas are unmatched on the PlayStation." Grant criticized the game's camera system, writing, "Camera work is always a sticky item in 3rd person perspective games. In Xena, because of the speed of the melee combat and the 360 degree action, the camera gets to be a real problem." However, Grant wrote that the camera issues were not "overly irritating". Grant noted the "very short and focussed levels", as well as the difficulty of the final boss battle, which was largely due to camera issues.

Jeff Lundrigan of Next Generation gave the PlayStation version four stars out of five and said, "Solidly crafted, with a few nice touches and a thoughtful design, this one comes HIGHLY RECOMMENDED."
