= The Blues Brothers: Jukebox Adventure =

1993 video game

- Intro screen (MS-DOS, VGA mode)
- Developer(s): Titus France
- Publisher(s): Titus France
- Platform(s): SNES, MS-DOS, Game Boy
- Release: June 1993: SNES; 1994: Game Boy, MS-DOS
- Genre(s): Platform
- Mode(s): Single-player, multiplayer

Reception

Review scores
Publication	Score
Electronic Gaming Monthly	5.8/10 (GB) (Note: In Electronic Gaming Monthly's review of the Game Boy version, four critics gave it a 6/10, and only one other reviewer gave it a 5/10.)
GameFan	78% (SNES) (Note: In GameFan's review of the SNES version, four critics gave it different ratings: 79%, 68%, 80%, and 86%.)
GamePro	2.75/5 (GB) (Note: GamePro gave the Game Boy port two 3/5 scores for sound and control and two 2.5/5 ratings for graphics and fun factor.)
Nintendo Power	3.225/5 (SNES) (Note: Nintendo Power rated the SNES version 3.5/5 for graphics, 3.1/5 for play control, 3.3/5 for challenge, and 3/5 for theme/fun.)
Super Play	68% (SNES)
Electronic Games	C (MS-DOS)
GB Action	91% (GB)
PC Action	78% (MS-DOS)
Super Gamer	76/100 (GB)
Super Power	44/100 (GB)
Super Pro	71/100 (SNES)

The Blues Brothers: Jukebox Adventure is a video game based on the band The Blues Brothers and a sequel to The Blues Brothers. The game was released for the Super Nintendo Entertainment System in 1993 (as The Blues Brothers) and for IBM PC compatibles and Game Boy in 1994. An Amiga port was developed and even reviewed by several videogame magazines, but never released.

== Gameplay ==
The characters have to gather vinyl discs to throw them at enemies and find the jukebox at the end of each level to make it to the next one. The game can be played by two players simultaneously, and the scrolling screen keeps focus on both characters by pushing the one that gets behind.

Each version has different soundtracks. While the SNES and MS-DOS versions used a combination of Blues Brothers licensed music with original compositions by Dimitris Yerasimos, the Game Boy version has a soundtrack composed by Thorsten Mitschele.
