= World Masters Golf =

1995 video game

- Cover art
- Developer(s): Arc Developments
- Publisher(s): Virgin Interactive Entertainment
- Composer(s): Chris Brighton
- Platform(s): Super NES
- Release: EU: November 23, 1995
- Genre(s): Sports
- Mode(s): Single-player, multiplayer

World Masters Golf is a golf simulation video game for the Super NES released in Europe.

== Summary ==
This video game features four gouraud shaded courses in order to produce continuous shading of surfaces represented by polygon meshes. Modes of gameplay are: tournament, match play, and practice. There are created golfers and the option for the player to create his own. The game allows golf handicapping. Up to eight players can play. There is a Mode 7 view camera that follows the ball after it is hit. Basic information like the wind speed, distance to the flag, the number of shots required to make par on a hole, and the number of shots already made on a hole are shown while playing the game.
