= Prehistorik =

1991 video game

- Atari ST box art
- Developer: Titus France
- Publisher: Titus France
- Platforms: Amiga, Amstrad CPC, Atari ST, MS-DOS, CDTV
- Release: 1991
- Genre: Platform
- Mode: Single-player

Prehistorik is a 1991 platform game developed by Titus Interactive for the Amiga, Atari ST, Amstrad CPC, MS-DOS, and Commodore CDTV.

A sequel, Prehistorik 2, was released for MS-DOS and Amstrad CPC. The sequel was also ported to Nintendo systems and became a downloadable title for the Nintendo DSi in North America in February 2010. In 2013, Anuman Interactive launched a remake of the game, adapted for iOS and Android.

== Gameplay ==
The playable character is a caveman armed with a club. In a search for food, the neanderthal must hit dinosaurs and other animals that come in his way and pick up powerups. Some enemies can't be beat, so the player must dodge them. A boss awaits at the end of each level.

Amiga version

== Reception ==
Zzap stated that "This is one of the best games produced by Titus. It has simple, non nonsense gameplay and brilliant, melt-your-heart graphics". Furthermore the music was "excellent and the sound effects are quirky and funny". The score was 70%.

The highest score was Amiga Action's 85 %. A re-release in 1993 consistently garnered more negative reviews than did the original, ranging from 30% to 59 %.
