= Hercules: The Legendary Journeys (video game) =

2001 video game

- North American Nintendo 64 cover art
- Developer: Player 1 (Note: Game Boy Color version developed and published by Titus Interactive in 2001.)
- Publisher: Titus Interactive
- Platforms: Nintendo 64, Game Boy Color
- Release: Nintendo 64: NA: August 18, 2000; UK: October 6, 2000; Game Boy Color: EU: September 14, 2001
- Genre: Action-adventure
- Mode: Single-player

Hercules: The Legendary Journeys is a 2000 action-adventure game based on the television series of the same name, released by Titus Interactive for the Nintendo 64 and Game Boy Color. The player controls Hercules and his friends, Iolaus and Serena, on a quest to free Zeus from the forces of Ares and Hera.

The gameplay differs depending on the version played; the N64 version is a 3D game with elements of platforming and role playing games while the Game Boy Color version is a side-scrolling adventure game with shifting view perspectives.

The Nintendo 64 version has received mixed to positive reviews, with it being praised for its variety in content, but criticized for feeling too similar to The Legend of Zelda: Ocarina of Time. Meanwhile, the Game Boy Color version has received mixed to negative reviews with it being criticized for its gameplay and challenges, along with conflicting reactions for the game's blend of formulas.

== Gameplay ==
A screenshot of Hercules: The Legendary Journeys (Nintendo 64) depicting Hercules attacking an enemy in a 3D space.

The player controls Hercules and his friends, Iolaus and Serena, to free Zeus against the forces of Ares and Hera and their minions. The Nintendo 64 version of Hercules integrates elements of platform, role-playing and adventure games. Players control characters to complete combat, quests and puzzles, with each having unique abilities, such as Hercules' ability to throw items, Iolaus' ability to reach otherwise inaccessible places, and Serena's ability to use ranged weaponry. Combat is straightforward and uses direct attacks against player and enemy "life energy", as well as a "magic menu" to cast magical powers. The game features twelve locations and five arenas.

The Game Boy Color version of Hercules differs slightly from the Nintendo 64 version. The game is played in mixed perspectives as an overhead and side-scrolling action-adventure game. The Game Boy version also contains the notable feature of being able to use the Game Link Cable with a system playing Xena: Warrior Princess to switch the characters in the game and unlock secret levels.

== Reception ==
Reception

Review scores
Publication	Score	
Publication	GBC	N64
AllGame		2/5
GameSpot		6.3/10
IGN		6.9
Nintendo Power		6/10
Official Nintendo Magazine		77%
64		80%
Nintendojo		5.6/10
Total Game Boy	74%	
Game Boy Xtreme	48%	

Reception of the Nintendo 64 version of Hercules was mixed. 64 praised the range of content in the game, stating "there are plenty of puzzles to crack, codes to break and people to save...you are never bored for want of something to do", and the "many different environments" in the game. GameSpot assessed the game as "moderately challenging" and a "decent adventure", praising the simple control scheme and "solid" presentation.

Criticism against Hercules was directed towards the derivative nature of the game, with several reviewers raising unfavorable comparisons to The Legend of Zelda: Ocarina of Time. Official Nintendo Magazine remarked the game was "not (ugly) but the levels are so big and empty" and "not exactly inspiring," labelling it as a "Zelda wannabe" due to similarities in the control system and menu screens. Similarly, Nintendo Power found the game to be a "pale Zelda wannabe", stating "much of the quest is bogged down with repetitive combat and uneventful exploration".

The Game Boy Color version received mixed reviews, with critics finding frustration with the execution of the gameplay. In an indifferent review, Jem Roberts of Total Game Boy praised the "genuinely compelling" puzzles and found "loads to do", but observed the game was compromised by "stupid challenges" and an "unbelievably irritating" save system. In contrast, Oliver Lan of Game Boy Xtreme dismissed the game as "monotonous" and "irritating", finding most of the gameplay involving "trudging around with nothing to do"; however, he acknowledged it contained an "interesting mix of gameplay styles." Both reviews remarked the game was superior to the Game Boy Color version of Xena: Warrior Princess.
