= The Brainies =

1991 video game

- North American cover art for Super NES version
- Developers: Atreid Concept; Titus France (SNES)<
- Publishers: Loriciel; Titus France (SNES)
- Designers: Didier Capdevielle; Pascal Gallon
- Programmer: François Mathieu
- Artist: Stéphan Renaudin
- Composers: Frédéric Motte; Philippe Girard
- Platforms: Amiga; Amstrad CPC; Atari ST; MS-DOS; Apple IIgs; Macintosh; Super NES
- Release: Amiga: NA: 1991; EU: 1991; Super NES: NA: April 1996; EU: 1996
- Genre: Puzzle
- Mode: Single-player

The Brainies is a 1991 puzzle video game developed by Atreid Concept and published by Loriciel. It was released for Atari ST, Amiga, Apple IIgs, Macintosh, and Amstrad CPC computers. Even though its European title is Tiny Skweeks, the connection to the popular Skweek series was made late. The game is also known as The Tinies on home computers. Titus France licensed the game and released a port to the Super Nintendo Entertainment System in 1996.

== Gameplay ==
Using the 3D mode in the Super NES version of the game, taking advantage of the Mode 7.

The gameplay revolves around Mexican jumping beans (referred to in game as Brainies) as they navigate 101 levels to solve the puzzles that are in their way.

A time limit is in effect; running out of time means losing a life. Players can only control the direction in which a Brainy will walk; taking care not to bump into another Brainy or an obstacle. There are four difficulty levels and the object is to return the Mexican jumping beans safely home. Items can be picked up; they may be beneficial or detrimental to the Brainy depending on certain factors. Arrows can also force a Brainy to change directions, rendering him helpless for a while and possibly messing up a carefully solved puzzle.

== Reception ==
GamePro gave the Super NES version a generally positive review, criticizing that "the icons are too small", but praising the brain-stretching and addictive gameplay.

The Super NES version of the video game was covered in the 86th issue of Nintendo Power
