= Blues Brothers 2000 (video game) =

2000 video game

- North American Nintendo 64 cover art
- Developer: Player 1
- Publisher: Titus Interactive
- Platform: Nintendo 64
- Release: EU: October 13, 2000; NA: November 17, 2000
- Genres: Platform game Music game
- Modes: Single-player, multiplayer

Blues Brothers 2000 is a platform game for the Nintendo 64 console, released by Titus Interactive. The game is a platformer, loosely based on the band and the film. Due to major delays it was released two years after the film of the same name but in the year the film was set.

== Gameplay ==
The game player starts out as Elwood in Joliet prison who needs to get the band together for the battle of the bands, which is in less than two days. After saving the guitarist, Cab, then defeating the warden, the player's progresses through Chicago, in hopes of finding Mac and Buster. After going about the rooftops, the player enters Willie's Club, where Mac is being held captive. After defeating Willie, Mac says that Buster has escaped to the old graveyard. Arriving there, the player finds that an evil tree has put Buster in a cage. The final battle takes place in a swamp.

== Development ==
At first, Blues Brothers 2000 had its pre-production materials designed in-house at Titus Interactive Studio France while they deliberated on which company should be in charge of development. They considered H2O Entertainment along with three other developers. Ultimately, they chose to go with the development studio Player 1. They aimed for the game to be released in late 1999. However, the game suffered major delays. It ultimately released in Europe on October 13, 2000 and in North America on November 17, 2000.

== Reception ==
Reception

Aggregate scores
Aggregator	Score
GameRankings	50.89%
Metacritic	32/100

Review scores
Publication	Score
GameSpot	4.4/10
IGN	5.4/10
Mega Fun	14%
MeriStation	7/10
Nintendo Power	6.8/10
Official Nintendo Magazine	85/100
Superjuegos	85/100
Video Games (DE)	69%
64	79%
64 (ES)	59%
Nintendo Acción	79/100
Nintendo Pro	90%

The game was met with mixed reception upon release; GameRankings gave it a score of 50.89%, while Metacritic gave it 32 out of 100. The earliest review came from Nintendo Power, which gave it a score of 6.8 out of 10 in the August issue, even though the game itself was not released in North America until three months later. Nintendo Official Magazine gave the game a score of 85 out of 100 stating "There's plenty going on in Blues Brother 2000's one player, but the multiplayer is a let down. A great platform romp that hasn't quite got little Mario's magic."
