= List of Top Gun video games =

The list of Top Gun video games has several licensed video games based on the film series, which started with Top Gun (1986).

== Top Gun (Ocean game) ==
The Ocean Software version of Top Gun was released in 1986 for Atari ST, Commodore 64, ZX Spectrum, and Amstrad CPC.

It is a one-on-one dogfighting simulator with 3D wire-frame model graphics, unique among more traditional sprite-based graphics and straightforward gameplay of the subsequent games. It has one and two-player modes; in the former, the opposing aircraft is flown by the computer.

== Top Gun (Konami game) ==
Title screen of the NES version

Gameplay of the NES version

The Konami version of Top Gun was released for Nintendo Entertainment System (NES) in November 1987 in the United States. It is an adaptation of an earlier arcade game by Konami titled Vs. Top Gun, released for the Nintendo VS. System. Two million copies of the NES version were sold.

Piloting an F-14 Tomcat fighter, the player, as the film's protagonist Maverick, has to complete four missions. Given a choice of missiles, and starting with a training mission, the player is sent after an enemy aircraft carrier, an enemy base, and finally an enemy Space Shuttle. The game has two endings. If the player loses but achieves a minimum score of 50,000 points, a still shot is shown of the player being presented the Top Gun plaque that was awarded to Iceman in the film. If the player completes all four missions and successfully lands on the aircraft carrier, a scene is shown of the F-14 taxiing on the carrier and the player waving to the LSO crew.

Gameplay takes place from the cockpit's point of view and consists of two main themes: dogfighting and landing the aircraft. For the dogfights, the player is allowed to pick between three missile types, each varying in the target locking area they can be fired at. Landing of the aircraft can be particularly difficult as it requires the player to control both speed and angle of aircraft. The point of view for the final part of the landing sequences is from the side of the aircraft carrier with the F-14 coming in from the right side of the screen.

== The Second Mission ==
Top Gun: The Second Mission, released in Japan as Top Gun: Dual Fighters, is the second Top Gun game produced by Konami for NES. It was released in Japan on December 15, 1989, in North America in January 1990, and in Europe and Australia on October 24, 1991.

== Danger Zone ==
Top Gun: Danger Zone, developed by Distinctive Software and published by Konami, was released for MS-DOS in 1991. Players have a choice of two aircraft: F-14 Tomcat and F-18 Hornet. The mission choices are intercept, escort, clear airspace, provide air support, and run interference. The players can participate in the "Top Gun Challenge Board" in the Officer's Mess and can play against the CPU or another human player in split-screen mode.

== Guts and Glory ==
Top Gun: Guts and Glory, developed by Distinctive Software and published by Konami, was released for Game Boy in January 1993. The player pilots an F-14 Tomcat against Soviet Union forces. The game offers extra modes and jet fighters like other USA F-series and the MiG-29 Fulcrum, in combat with top enemy aces flying MiGs.

== Fire at Will ==
Top Gun: Fire at Will was released by Spectrum Holobyte in 1996 for Classic Mac OS, MS-DOS, Windows, and PlayStation. The PlayStation version differs greatly, emphasizing action over simulation; in particular, take-offs and landings were cut, and the player begins each mission with enemies near at hand, rather than having to hunt them down. It is also the only game with any actors from the film, with James Tolkan reprising his role as a commanding officer (he is called "Stinger" in the film, but is called "Hondo" in Fire at Will). The overall plot focuses on the player-character, Maverick, going to combat in Cuba, North Korea, and Libya against a secret group of mercenary pilots called the "Cadre".

== Hornet's Nest ==
Top Gun: Hornet's Nest was developed by Zipper Interactive and published by MicroProse. It was released in 1998 for Windows. Instead of the F-14 Tomcat, players pilot the F/A-18C.

== Firestorm ==
Top Gun: Firestorm was developed by Fluid Studios and published by Titus Interactive in 2001 for Game Boy Color. It was released the following year for Game Boy Advance, under the title Top Gun: Firestorm Advance. It is an isometric flight action game with missions.

== Combat Zones ==
Top Gun: Combat Zones was developed for PlayStation 2 by Digital Integration and published in 2001 by Titus Interactive. Conversions were released for GameCube (2002) and Windows (2003). In 2004, Mastiff published a version for Game Boy Advance and re-released the PS2 and GameCube versions.

The game is composed of 36 missions spread over three eras of the history and near future of the Top Gun combat school. In each era, missions are located both at the Top Gun academy at Miramar and in a live combat zone. Missions must be performed before moving to the combat zone. Missions introduce new game concepts, aircraft, and weapons against tough opponents and live fire. The game features various Navy fighter aircraft and bonus fighter aircraft.

Only the first era is accessible from the beginning, and is set in South East Asia, toward the end of the Vietnam War (erroneously showing the F-14 engaging in combat with North Vietnamese forces, despite never having fired a shot in action during that conflict). During the second era, the action is set in the Persian Gulf States circa 1990; although the story does not make direct reference, parallels can be drawn to the real-world Gulf conflicts of that time (such as hunting for Scud missiles and protecting oil refineries). The final era is set within the Arctic Circle and depicts a future conflict based around disputed borders and a global fuel crisis.

== Air Combat ==
Top Gun: Air Combat for Java ME was released in 2003. Hands-On Mobile (formerly named Mforma) published this top-down scrolling arcade shooter.

== Air Combat II ==
Top Gun: Air Combat II for Java ME was released in 2004. Hands-On Mobile (formerly named Mforma) published this top-down scrolling arcade shooter.

== Top Gun (2006) ==
Top Gun for Nintendo DS was released on February 23, 2006, in Japan, April 28 in North America, and May 3 in Europe. It was developed by Interactive Vision, and published by Mastiff Inc in North America, 505 Games in Europe, and Taito in Japan.

The story-driven campaign features film actors, a set of solo missions, and a multiplayer mode for up to 4 players. The bottom screen is used as a map and weapons readout.

=== Reception ===
Top Gun (2006)

Aggregate score
Aggregator	Score
Metacritic	48/100

Review scores
Publication	Score
Famitsu	22/40
GameSpot	3.6/10
GameZone	5/10
IGN	5/10
Jeuxvideo.com	9/20
Nintendo Power	4/10

Top Gun received "generally unfavorable reviews", according to video game review aggregator Metacritic. In Japan, Famitsu gave it a score of two sixes and two fives for a total of 22 out of 40.

== Gulf Crisis ==
Top Gun: Gulf Crisis for Java ME was released in 2006. Hands-On Mobile (formerly named Mforma) published it. It is similar to Sega's After Burner series.

== Top Gun (2007) ==
Top Gun was released on October 5, 2007, for PlayStation 2 in Europe only. It was developed by Atomic Planet Entertainment, and published by Blast! Entertainment Ltd.

== Top Gun (2009) ==
Top Gun for iOS was released in 2009. In 2011, it was ported to PlayStation Portable. It was developed by Freeverse Inc., and published by Paramount Digital Entertainment. The game was revealed by Freeverse Inc. over a month before the release. It is similar to Sega's After Burner games. It uses accelerometer to pilot the plane around and touch firing controls. The plot involves the Miramar Top Gun School featuring cartoon versions of the film characters Maverick, Iceman, and Viper. It was later released on PSP.

== Top Gun 2 ==
Top Gun 2 for iOS was released on August 19, 2010. It was developed by Freeverse Inc., and published by Paramount Digital Entertainment. It is similar to Sega's After Burner series.

=== Reception ===
Top Gun 2

Aggregate score
Aggregator	Score
Metacritic	71/100

Review scores
Publication	Score
IGN	7.5/10
Macworld	(average)
Pocket Gamer	3.5/5

Top Gun 2 received "mixed or average reviews" according to Metacritic.

== Top Gun (2010) ==
Top Gun was released in 2010 for PlayStation 3 and Windows. It was developed by Doublesix, and published by Paramount Digital Entertainment.

== Hard Lock ==
Top Gun: Hard Lock is a combat flight simulator game, developed by Headstrong Games and published by 505 Games for PlayStation 3, Xbox 360, and Microsoft Windows in 2012. Taking place after the film, the player takes the role of a pilot named Lance "Spider" Webb, who graduated from Top Gun under the auspices of Pete "Maverick" Mitchell, who is now an instructor. As Spider, the player engages in missions during a blockade of a new terrorist regime (a former US ally who had a coup) in the Persian Gulf. The player flies missions from the USS McKinley in the Gulf, which involve shooting down hostile planes and destroying missile boats. Eventually, the player conducts bombing runs over enemy camps and bunkers, and the last mission involves assisting NATO ground forces, an airfield, and special forces troops in attacking the enemy forces.

=== Reception ===
Top Gun: Hard Lock

Aggregate score
Aggregator	Score
Metacritic	(X360) 54/100 (PC) 47/100 (PS3) 43/100

Review scores
Publication	Score
4Players	70%
Jeuxvideo.com	9/20
PlayStation Official Magazine – Australia	(PS3) 40%
Official Xbox Magazine (UK)	(X360) 4/10
Official Xbox Magazine (US)	(X360) 4/10
Play	(PS3) 45%
The Digital Fix	(X360) 5/10

The Xbox 360 version received "mixed" reviews, while the PC and PlayStation 3 versions received "unfavorable" reviews, according to Metacritic.

== Canceled games ==
In 1995, a Top Gun game from Spectrum Holobyte was announced, intended as an exclusive launch game for Nintendo 64 in late 1996. However, as the launch approached, Spectrum Holobyte became dissatisfied with Nintendo's treatment of the console's third party publishers. Head of Spectrum Holobyte Steve Race commented, "There is still no sign of a publisher plan for any licensee, and the machine is supposed to be just five months away from launch. We're already worried about the long lead times and high cost of supporting a cartridge machine. The question is, does Nintendo really think it needs licensees? It seems to want the lion's share of the software sales, possibly as much as two thirds." In 1996, a Top Gun game was also in development by Spectrum Holobyte for the Panasonic M2 but it was never released due to the system's cancellation.
