= Titus Interactive =

French video game publisher

Titus Interactive SA
- ISIN: FR0000050122
- Industry: Video games
- Founded: 1985; 41 years ago (as Titus France SA)
- Founders: Eric Caen, Hervé Caen
- Defunct: 2005
- Fate: Bankruptcy and Liquidation; assets now owned by Interplay Entertainment
- Headquarters: Lagny-sur-Marne, France
- Revenue: € 73.2 million (2002)
- Divisions: Digital Integration Ltd. BlueSky Software
- Subsidiaries: Titus Interactive Studio; Titus Software Corporation; Titus Japan K.K. Titus Software UK Limited; PronostiX S.A. Sofra Jeux; EyeOne A/S; Interplay Europe; Avalon Interactive; Avalon France
- Website: www.titus-interactive.com (archived)

Titus Interactive SA, known as Titus France SA until March 1999, was a French software publisher that produced and published video games for various platforms. Its head office was located in Parc de l'Esplanade in Lagny sur Marne in Greater Paris. At one time, it was in Montfermeil, elsewhere in Greater Paris.

The company's mascot was Titus, the title character of Titus the Fox.

== History ==
=== Founding and early years ===
The company was founded by brothers Eric Caen and Hervé Caen in France in 1985. In 1991, Titus purchased Palace Software, the gaming division of the Palace Group. In 1998, the company purchased the developers BlueSky Software and Digital Integration Ltd.

=== Interplay Entertainment partnership and distribution agreements (1999–2002) ===
In late 1999, the company acquired shares in struggling publisher Interplay Entertainment, including a stake in publisher/distributor Virgin Interactive.

Throughout the next few years, Titus signed North American distribution deals with smaller publishers. They signed a deal with Cryo Interactive in March 2000, with Rage Software in September 2000, and Microids in May 2001. In 2002, Titus Japan K.K. signed a similar distribution deal with Konami for Japan.

In August 2000, it signed a deal with Viacom Consumer Products to publish games based on the Top Gun franchise.

In August 2001, Titus took the control of Interplay. However prior to this, Titus took over distributing its own titles in the North American market as well as Virgin's from them.

=== Closure ===
In June 2004, Titus filed for bankruptcy, declaring an unseeable future for Interplay. On 9 January 2005, a French district commercial court declared Titus bankrupt with a €33 million (US$43.8 million) debt. Titus' French subsidiaries were later closed down, while their assets were soon purchased by Interplay.

== Games ==
Titus began releasing titles for home computers such as the Amiga, Amstrad CPC, Atari ST, Commodore 64, ZX Spectrum, and IBM PC compatibles before moving on to consoles like the Master System, Super Nintendo Entertainment System, Game Boy, and Game Boy Color, PlayStation, Dreamcast and Nintendo 64, followed by games for the GameCube, PlayStation 2, and Xbox.

Titus designed games such as Virtual Kasparov, Automobili Lamborghini, Virtual Chess 64, Roadsters (the Nintendo 64 version), Incredible Crisis (developed by Polygon Magic), Prehistorik Man and Lamborghini American Challenge, that were given positive reviews. Titus however was also involved in the creation of games that were notable due to their negative reception. Superman for the Nintendo 64 was notorious for its negative status among gamers. GameTrailers called it the worst game of all time. As of 2018, it holds a score of 23% at GameRankings. Similarly, the 2003 game RoboCop also received negative reviews. GameSpot gave it 2.2/10 saying "RoboCop has a bevy of horrible problems that render the game practically unplayable".

Year	Title	Platform(s)	Developer(s)
1988	Crazy Cars	Amiga, Amstrad CPC, Atari ST, Commodore 64, Macintosh, MS-DOS, MSX, ZX Spectrum	
1988	Fire and Forget	Amiga, Amstrad CPC, Atari ST, MS-DOS, ZX Spectrum	
1988	Galactic Conqueror	Amiga, Amstrad CPC, Atari ST, MS-DOS	
1988	Off Shore Warrior	Amiga, Amstrad CPC, Atari ST, MS-DOS	
1989	Crazy Cars 2	Amiga, Amstrad CPC, Atari ST, Commodore 64, GX4000, Macintosh, MS-DOS, ZX Spectrum	
1989	Titan	Amiga, Amstrad CPC, Atari ST, Commodore 64, Macintosh, NES, PC Engine, ZX Spectrum	
1989	Knight Force	Amiga, Amstrad CPC, Atari ST, MS-DOS, ZX Spectrum	
1990	Crime Does not Pay	Amiga, Atari ST, MS-DOS	
1990	Dark Century	Amiga, Amstrad CPC, Atari ST, MS-DOS	
1990	Dick Tracy	Amiga, Amstrad CPC, Atari ST, Commodore 64, GX4000, MS-DOS, ZX Spectrum	
1990	Fire & Forget II	Amiga, Amstrad CPC, Atari ST, Commodore 64, GX4000, MS-DOS, Master System	
1990	Un Indien dans la ville (Little Indian: An Indian in the City for US release)		TF1 Video
1990	Wild Streets	Amiga, Amstrad CPC, Atari ST, Commodore 64, GX4000, MS-DOS, ZX Spectrum	
1991	The Blues Brothers	Amiga, Amstrad CPC, Atari ST, Commodore 64, MS-DOS, NES, Game Boy	
1991	Prehistorik	Amiga, Amstrad CPC, Atari ST, MS-DOS	
1992	Battlestorm	Amiga, CDTV, MS-DOS	
1992	Crazy Cars 3	Amiga, Amstrad CPC, Atari ST, Commodore 64, MS-DOS	
1992	Titus the Fox (aka Moktar)	Amiga, Amstrad CPC, Atari ST, MS-DOS, Game Boy, Game Boy Color	
1993	Ardy Lightfoot		ASCII
1993	The Blues Brothers: Jukebox Adventure	Game Boy, MS-DOS, SNES	
1993	Prehistorik 2	Amstrad CPC, GX4000, MS-DOS	
1993	Super Cauldron	Amiga, Amstrad CPC, Atari ST	
1994	Monster Max		
1994	Lamborghini American Challenge	Amiga, CD32, Game Boy, MS-DOS, SNES	
1994	Quik the Thunder Rabbit	Amiga, CD32	
1995	Virtua Chess		
1995	Apache		Digital Integration
1996	Metal Rage		
1996	The Brainies		
1996	Incantation		
1996	Oscar (Super NES version)		
1996	Power Piggs of the Dark Age		
1996	Prehistorik Man		
1996	Prince of Persia 2: The Shadow and the Flame (Super NES version)		
1996	Realm		
1997	Virtual Chess 2		
1997	Superman (Game Boy)		
1997	Automobili Lamborghini		
1998	Virtual Chess 64	Nintendo 64	
1998	Quest for Camelot		
1999	Rival Realms	Windows	Activ Pub
1999	Roadsters	Nintendo 64	Titus Interactive
1999	Superman: The New Superman Adventures	Nintendo 64	Titus Interactive
1999	Evil Zone	PlayStation	YUKE's Future Media Creators
1999	Xena: Warrior Princess: The Talisman of Fate	Nintendo 64	Saffire
2000	Incredible Crisis	PlayStation	Polygon Magic
2000	Hercules: The Legendary Journeys	Nintendo 64	Player 1
2000	Carmageddon 64	Nintendo 64, Game Boy Color	Aqua Pacific (GBC) Software Creations (N64)
2000	Blues Brothers 2000	Nintendo 64	Player 1
2000	Kao the Kangaroo	Windows, Dreamcast	X-Ray Interactive Titus Interactive Studio
2000	F/A-18E Super Hornet	Windows	Digital Integration
2000	Rox	Game Boy Color	
2001	Worms World Party	Windows, Dreamcast	Team17
2001	Virtual Kasparov	PlayStation	Titus Interactive Studio
2001	Exhibition of Speed	Dreamcast	Player 1
2001	Hands of Time	Game Boy Color	Mirage
2001	Top Gun: Firestorm	Game Boy Color	Fluid Studios
2001	Xena: Warrior Princess	Game Boy Color	Titus Interactive Studio
2001	Hercules: The Legendary Journeys	Game Boy Color	Titus Interactive Studio
2001	RoboCop	Game Boy Color	Titus Interactive Studio
2001	Prehistorik Man	Game Boy Advance	Titus Interactive Studio
2001	Top Gun: Combat Zones	PlayStation 2	Digital Integration
2001	Stunt GP	PlayStation 2	Team17
2001	Planet Monsters	Game Boy Advance	Planet Interactive
2001	Kao the Kangaroo	Game Boy Advance	Titus Interactive Studio
2001	Original War (Note: North American distribution only; published by Virgin Interactive.)	Windows	Altar Interactive
2001	Codename: Outbreak (Note: North American distribution only; published by Virgin Interactive.)	Windows	GSC Game World
2001	Screamer 4x4 (Note: North American distribution only; published by Virgin Interactive.)	Windows	Clever's Games
2002	Nightstone (Note: North American distribution only; published by Virgin Interactive.)	Windows	New Horizon Studios
2002	Virtual Kasparov	Game Boy Advance	Titus Interactive Studio
2002	Tir et But: Edition Champions du Monde	Game Boy Advance	Titus Interactive Studio
2002	Barbarian	PlayStation 2	Saffire
2002	Downforce	PlayStation 2	Smart Dog
2002	Top Gun: Combat Zones	GameCube	Digital Integration
2002	Top Gun: Firestorm Advance	Game Boy Advance	Fluid Studios
2002	Downforce	Game Boy Advance	Karma Studios
2003	Barbarian	GameCube, (Note: Exclusively released in Japan.) Xbox (Note: Exclusively released in Europe.)	Saffire
2003	Top Gun: Combat Zones	Windows (Note: Exclusively released in Europe.)	Digital Integration
2003	RoboCop	Windows, (Note: Exclusively released in Europe.) Xbox, PlayStation 2 (Note: Exclusively released in Europe and Japan.)	Titus Interactive Studio
2004	RoboCop	GameCube (Note: Exclusively released in Japan.)	Titus Interactive Studio
2004	Top Gun: Combat Zones (Note: Published by Mastiff.)	Game Boy Advance	Titus Interactive Studio

== Subsidiaries ==
Titus had several subsidiaries. The United States subsidiary, Titus Software Corporation, had its head office in Chatsworth, Los Angeles. The Japanese subsidiary, Titus Japan K.K., had its head office on the eighth floor of the Kotubuki Dogenzaka Building in Dōgenzaka (JA), Shibuya, Tokyo. The UK subsidiary, Titus Software UK Limited, had its head office in Leamington Spa, Warwickshire.
