= Prehistorik Man =

1995 video game

- North American SNES box art
- Developer: Titus France
- Publishers: EU/NA: Titus Interactive; JP: Kemco
- Director: Rob Stevens
- Producers: Eric Caen; Florent Moreau
- Designers: Francis Fournier; Florent Moreau; Rob Stevens; Eric Zmiro
- Programmer: Rob Stevens
- Composers: Laurent Mignard; Gilles Rea; Thorsten Mitschele (Game Boy)
- Platforms: Super NES, Game Boy Advance, Nintendo DSi
- Release: SNES: JP: June 23, 1995; NA: January 25, 1996; EU: June 27, 1996; Game Boy Advance: NA: December 4, 2001; Nintendo DSi: JP: August 25, 2010; NA: February 15, 2010; EU: July 2, 2010
- Genre: Platform
- Mode: Single player

Prehistorik Man is a platform video game developed and published by Titus Interactive for the Super Nintendo Entertainment System. It is a sequel to Prehistorik 2, featuring similar graphics but a richer and different story, and additional non-player characters which, among other things, provide hints and a tutorial.

The game was later released for the Game Boy Advance and the Nintendo DSi (as a DSiWare release), with the latter being released in North America in February 2010. Prehistorik Man was added to the Nintendo Classics service in February 2021.

The Super NES version received positive reviews from critics with the story, sound and gameplay being praised. The Game Boy Advance and DSiware ports, however, have gotten mixed reviews.

== Plot ==
Prehistorik Man, like its predecessor, takes place in a fictionalized Stone Age. In the middle of the night, greedy dinosaurs steal all the food from a small village. With winter coming and the village inhabitants facing starvation, the Village Chief summons Sam (William Hanna), a young and agile villager, and tasks him with obtaining food to help the village survive the impending winter.

== Gameplay ==
Sam using a hang glider

The player controls Sam by navigating him through a total of 23 side-scrolling levels. The main task is for the player to collect all the food in each level while defeating enemies to make them drop their bones, which is used as currency in the game. The player starts out with three hearts. If the player loses them all, they lose a life and must restart the level. Midway through each level, there is a checkpoint (called a Rees-Tartah) so Sam will not have to start at the beginning once touched. Sam has many abilities to help the player through each level including running "like a dog" to move faster, and the shout which enables the player to defeat all enemies on screen. Sam's default weapon is a spiked club, but he can find other weapons like spears and axes, which will replace any weapon used before, but these weapons have limited ammo. Throughout the game, various items can be found varying from "stone age shields", which make the player temporarily invincible, heart containers to permanently raise the player's health, and letters which spell out B-O-N-U-S, which, when all are collected, send the player to a bonus area for a chance to collect more bones and food. Shops are also available for the player to spend bones to buy various items, which the player can use to skip levels or even save their game. At the end of each level, the food is tallied up and the player is given an overall percentage on how well they did. Certain levels have different gameplay gimmicks which the player must learn in order to proceed. The majority of levels are simple platformers, but other levels involve the player finding specific key items, limit a player to using a vehicle, or defeating a boss.

In the DSiware version, the player can control Sam by using the touchpad on the bottom screen and Sam's power can increase by collecting upgrades that can last for a limited time. The bottom screen also has an item section to let players know what items they must collect to proceed through the game.

== Reception ==
Reception

Review scores
Publication	Score
Electronic Gaming Monthly	9/10, 9/10, 8.5/10, 9/10
Famitsu	6/10, 7/10, 6/10, 8/10 (SNES)

The Super NES version of the game received positive reviews. Electronic Gaming Monthly gave their "Game of the Month" award. They particularly lauded the game's storyline, humorous sound effects, strong play control, and numerous secrets.

The Game Boy Advance and DSiware ports, however, have received mixed reviews. Metacritic gave the Game Boy Advance version of the game a 69 out of 100, with one critic saying that while the game is a solid platformer, it is at the same time, rather generic. Frank Provo of GameSpot, however, praised the music and gave the game a 6.1 of 10, saying that Prehistorik Man is a weekend diversion from the GBA's more substantial fare. For the DSiware port, Desiree Turner of Nintendo Life gave the game 3 stars of 5. Game Informer gave the game an overall score of 8 out of 10 praising the game's originality for being an action/platformer.

The game sold more than 160,000 units.
