= Roadsters (video game) =

- European Nintendo 64 cover art
- Developers: Titus Interactive (Nintendo 64, Game Boy Color); Smart Dog (PlayStation); Player 1 (Dreamcast)
- Publisher: Titus Interactive
- Platforms: Nintendo 64, PlayStation, Dreamcast, Game Boy Color
- Release: Nintendo 64: NA: December 14, 1999; EU: December 17, 1999; Game Boy Color: NA: January 2000; EU: 2000; Dreamcast, PlayStation: NA: March 20, 2000; EU: July 7, 2000 (DC); EU: 2000 (PS)
- Genre: Racing
- Modes: Single player, multiplayer

Roadsters (working title: Roadsters Trophy) is a racing game released by Titus Software for Nintendo 64 in 1999, and for PlayStation, Dreamcast and Game Boy Color in 2000. It is a car racing game that features both licensed cars from manufacturers (e.g. Mitsubishi, Alfa Romeo, Lotus) and unlicensed cars from imaginary manufacturers which are based on and resemble their equivalent, real car models. The game also includes a multiplayer mode which supports up to two human players that can compete in any of the available circuits with four additional CPU controlled racers. Video game developer Player 1 originally planned to release the game for the PlayStation 2, but it was canceled.

== Gameplay ==
Roadsters is a car racing game that features both licensed cars from manufacturers (e.g. Mitsubishi, Alfa Romeo, Lotus) and unlicensed cars from imaginary manufacturers which are based on and resemble their equivalent, real car models. The game has eight racers and 34 cars from which players can choose from and four modes in total.

In the Roadster Trophy, the player starts by selecting one of the available racers and is given a sum of money that must be used to purchase a car. There are three divisions which the player can compete in. The third division is the easiest and requires the least money to participate, while the first is the hardest and requires a higher amount of money to participate. More money can be earned by winning the races, allowing the player to buy new cars or upgrade the ones that are already in possession. In Quick Race, the player can select the racer, car, circuit and weather conditions, and race against seven CPU controlled opponents.

The game also includes a multiplayer mode which supports up to two human players that can compete in any of the available circuits with four additional CPU controlled racers. This mode allows for either vertical or horizontal split screen. Like Quick Race mode, the player can select the racer, car, circuit and weather conditions, but without the competition of the other modes. The player instead races against time for a number of laps.

== Reception ==
Reception

Aggregate score
Aggregator	Score			
Aggregator	Dreamcast	GBC	N64	PS
GameRankings	45%	30%	65%	63%

Review scores
Publication	Score			
Publication	Dreamcast	GBC	N64	PS
AllGame	N/A	N/A	3/5	2/5
Game Informer	5.5/10	N/A	7/10	N/A
GameSpot	4.2/10	N/A	4.8/10	N/A
IGN	4.6/10	3/10	7.5/10	3/10
Next Generation	2/5	N/A	3/5	N/A

The Nintendo 64 version received mediocre reviews, while the Playstation, Dreamcast and Game Boy Color versions received unfavorable reviews.

The review aggregation website GameRankings has all versions at mediocre or low scores, but this is based on a small, unrepresentative sample of reviews.

Michael Wolf of NextGen said of the N64 version in its April 2000 issue, "While not as adrenaline-pumping as San Francisco Rush, it's a solid game with a decent engine that will certainly tide racing fans over until Nintendo releases Ridge Racer 64." Three issues later, however, Greg Orlando said that the Dreamcast version "provides a rather straight and uninterrupted ride to ennui."
