= List of Eidos Interactive games =

Video games by former British publisher and developer

Eidos Interactive was a British video game publisher and developer, which was absorbed into Square Enix Europe in November 2009.

== Video games ==
Title	First release	Developer(s)	Platform(s)	Ref(s).
25 to Life	17 January 2006	Avalanche Software	Microsoft Windows, PlayStation 2, Xbox	
100% Star	7 December 2001	Teque Interactive	PlayStation	
Abomination: The Nemesis Project	31 October 1999	Hothouse Creations	Microsoft Windows	
Age of Conan: Unchained	20 May 2008	Funcom	Microsoft Windows	
Akuji the Heartless	31 December 1998	Crystal Dynamics	PlayStation	
All Star Soccer	August 1997	Eidos Interactive	PlayStation	
Anachronox	27 June 2001	Ion Storm	Microsoft Windows	
Backyard Wrestling: Don't Try This at Home	8 October 2003	Paradox Development	PlayStation 2, Xbox	
Backyard Wrestling 2: There Goes the Neighborhood	16 November 2004	Paradox Development	PlayStation 2, Xbox	
Battlestations: Midway	30 January 2007	Eidos Hungary	Microsoft Windows, Xbox 360	
Beach Life	6 September 2002	Deep Red Games	Microsoft Windows	
Bionicle Heroes	14 November 2006	TT Games	Game Boy Advance, GameCube, Microsoft Windows, Nintendo DS, PlayStation 2, Wii, Xbox 360	
Blam! Machinehead	31 October 1996	Core Design	PlayStation, Sega Saturn	
Blood Omen 2	21 March 2002	Crystal Dynamics	GameCube, Microsoft Windows, PlayStation 2, Xbox	
Braveheart	31 July 1999	Red Lemon Studios	Microsoft Windows	
Championship Manager 2	22 September 1995	Sports Interactive	Microsoft Windows	
Championship Manager 96/97	27 September 1996	Sports Interactive	Microsoft Windows	
Championship Manager 97/98	31 October 1997	Sports Interactive	Microsoft Windows	
Championship Manager 3	26 March 1999	Sports Interactive	Microsoft Windows	
Championship Manager: Season 99/00	2000	Sports Interactive	Microsoft Windows	
Championship Manager: Season 00/01	27 October 2000	Sports Interactive	Microsoft Windows	
Championship Manager: Season 01/02	12 October 2001	Sports Interactive	Microsoft Windows, Xbox	
Championship Manager 4	28 March 2003	Sports Interactive	Microsoft Windows	
Championship Manager: Season 03/04	21 November 2003	Sports Interactive	Microsoft Windows	
Championship Manager Online	28 February 2005	Jadestone Group	Microsoft Windows	
Championship Manager 5	18 March 2005	Beautiful Game Studios	Microsoft Windows, PlayStation 2, Xbox	
Championship Manager	9 December 2005	Gusto Games	PlayStation Portable	
Championship Manager 2006	31 March 2006	Beautiful Game Studios	Microsoft Windows, PlayStation 2, PlayStation Portable, Xbox	
Championship Manager 2007	13 October 2006	Beautiful Game Studios	Microsoft Windows, PlayStation 2, PlayStation Portable, Xbox, Xbox 360	
Championship Manager 2008	2 November 2007	Beautiful Game Studios	Microsoft Windows	
Championship Manager Quiz	30 November 2001	Sports Interactive	PlayStation	
Chicken Run	13 November 2000	Blitz Games	Dreamcast, PlayStation	
Chili Con Carnage	16 February 2007	Deadline Games	PlayStation Portable	
Chill	April 1998	Silicon Dreams Studio	PlayStation, Sega Saturn	
Commandos: Behind Enemy Lines	31 July 1998	Pyro Studios	Microsoft Windows	
Commandos 2: Men of Courage	20 September 2001	Pyro Studios	Microsoft Windows, PlayStation 2, Xbox	
Commandos 3: Destination Berlin	14 October 2003	Pyro Studios	Microsoft Windows	
Commandos: Strike Force	17 March 2006	Pyro Studios	Microsoft Windows, PlayStation 2, Xbox	
Conflict: Denied Ops	8 February 2008	Pivotal Games	Microsoft Windows, PlayStation 3, Xbox 360	
Conquest Earth	31 August 1997	Data Design Interactive	Microsoft Windows	
Crash 'n' Burn	15 November 2004	Climax Group	PlayStation 2, Xbox	
CrimeWave	28 February 1997	Eidos Interactive	Sega Saturn	
Cutthroats: Terror on the High Seas	30 September 1999	Hothouse Creations	Microsoft Windows	
Daikatana	24 May 2000	Ion Storm	Microsoft Windows	
Deathtrap Dungeon	31 March 1998	Asylum Studios	PlayStation, Microsoft Windows	
Deus Ex	26 June 2000	Ion Storm	Microsoft Windows, PlayStation 2	
Deus Ex: Invisible War	2 December 2003	Ion Storm	Microsoft Windows, Xbox	
Disney's 101 Dalmatians II: Patch's London Adventure	14 October 2003	Backbone Entertainment	PlayStation	
Disney's 102 Dalmatians: Puppies to the Rescue	8 November 2000	Crystal Dynamics	Dreamcast, PlayStation	
Dominion: Storm Over Gift 3	11 June 1998	Ion Storm	Microsoft Windows	
Dragon Warrior Monsters	1999	Tose Co., Ltd.	Game Boy Color	
Duke Nukem 3D: Atomic Edition	December 1996	3D Realms	MS-DOS	
EOE: Eve of Extinction	26 February 2002	Yuke's	PlayStation 2	
F1 World Grand Prix: Season 1999	30 November 1999	Lankhor	PlayStation	
F1 World Grand Prix 2000	8 March 2001	Eutechnyx	Microsoft Windows, PlayStation	
FA Manager	June 1999	Krisalis Software	PlayStation	
Fear Effect	31 January 2000	Kronos Digital Entertainment	PlayStation	
Fear Effect 2: Retro Helix	21 February 2001	Kronos Digital Entertainment	PlayStation	
Fighting Force	31 October 1997	Core Design	Microsoft Windows, PlayStation	
Fighting Force 2	30 November 1999	Core Design	Dreamcast, PlayStation	
Final Fantasy VII	31 May 1998	Square	Microsoft Windows	
Final Fantasy VIII	25 January 2000	Square	Microsoft Windows	
Flight Unlimited II	12 December 1997	Looking Glass Studios	Microsoft Windows	
Ford Bold Moves Street Racing	25 September 2006	Razorworks	Microsoft Windows, PlayStation 2, PlayStation Portable, Xbox	
Fritz 7	2001	ChessBase	Microsoft Windows	
Gangsters: Organized Crime	30 November 1998	Hothouse Creations	Microsoft Windows	
Gangsters 2	1 June 2001	Hothouse Creations	Microsoft Windows	
Geon: Emotions	19 September 2007	Strawdog Studios	Xbox 360	
Get on da Mic	5 October 2004	Artificial Mind and Movement	PlayStation 2	
Gex 3: Deep Cover Gecko	1 March 1999	Crystal Dynamics	Nintendo 64, PlayStation	
Gex 3: Deep Pocket Gecko	November 1999	David A. Palmer IMS Productions	Game Boy Color	
Ghost Trap	25 July 2002	Artoon	Game Boy Advance	
Ghost Vibration	4 July 2002	Artoon	PlayStation 2	
Herdy Gerdy	22 February 2002	Core Design	PlayStation 2	
Hitman: Codename 47	19 November 2000	IO Interactive	Microsoft Windows	
Hitman 2: Silent Assassin	30 September 2002	IO Interactive	GameCube, Microsoft Windows, PlayStation 2, Xbox	
Hitman: Contracts	20 April 2004	IO Interactive	Microsoft Windows, PlayStation 2, Xbox	
Hitman: Blood Money	26 May 2006	IO Interactive	Microsoft Windows, PlayStation 2, Xbox, Xbox 360	
Imperial Glory	17 May 2005	Pyro Studios	Microsoft Windows	
Infernal	23 February 2007	Metropolis Software	Microsoft Windows, Xbox 360	
Johnny Bazookatone	1997	Arc Developments	PlayStation	
Joint Strike Fighter	1997	Innerloop Studios	Microsoft Windows	
Just Cause	22 September 2006	Avalanche Studios	Microsoft Windows, PlayStation 2, Xbox, Xbox 360	
Justice League Heroes	24 November 2006	Snowblind Studios	Game Boy Advance, Nintendo DS, PlayStation 2, PlayStation Portable, Xbox	
Kane & Lynch: Dead Men	13 November 2007	IO Interactive	Microsoft Windows, PlayStation 3, Xbox 360	
Legacy of Kain: Defiance	11 November 2003	Crystal Dynamics	Microsoft Windows, PlayStation 2, Xbox	
Legacy of Kain: Soul Reaver	16 August 1999	Crystal Dynamics	Dreamcast, Microsoft Windows, PlayStation	
Legaia 2: Duel Saga	29 November 2001	Prokion	PlayStation 2	
Lego Star Wars: The Video Game	29 March 2005	Traveller's Tales	Game Boy Advance, GameCube, Microsoft Windows, PlayStation 2, Xbox	
Mad Dash Racing	15 November 2001	Crystal Dynamics	Xbox	
Mad Maestro!	11 October 2001	Desert Productions	PlayStation 2	
Michael Owen's World League Soccer 99	1998	Silicon Dreams Studio	PlayStation	
Mister Mosquito	21 June 2001	ZOOM Inc.	PlayStation 2	
Monster Lab	4 November 2008	Backbone Entertainment	Nintendo DS, PlayStation 2, Wii	
Nervous Brickdown	26 June 2007	Arkedo Studio	Nintendo DS	
Ninja: Shadow of Darkness	30 September 1998	Core Design	PlayStation	
Official Formula 1 Racing	30 June 1999	Lankhor	Microsoft Windows	
Official Formula 1 Racing '99	1999	Eidos Interactive	Microsoft Windows	
Olympic Soccer: Atlanta 1996	18 July 1996	Silicon Dreams Studio	PlayStation, Sega Saturn	
Olympic Summer Games: Atlanta 1996	23 July 1996	Silicon Dreams Studio	PlayStation	
Omikron: The Nomad Soul	2 November 1999	Quantic Dream	Dreamcast, Microsoft Windows	
Orion Burger	1996	Sanctuary Woods	Microsoft Windows	
Pocket Pool	27 March 2007	Hyper-Devbox	PlayStation Portable	
Pony Friends	18 May 2007	Tantalus Media	Nintendo DS	
Pony Friends 2	20 November 2009	Tantalus Media	Nintendo DS, Wii, Windows	
Power F1	30 April 1997	Eidos Interactive	Microsoft Windows	
Power Stone	1999	Capcom	Dreamcast	
Power Stone 2	24 August 2000	Capcom	Dreamcast	
Praetorians	28 February 2003	Pyro Studios	Microsoft Windows	
Project Eden	8 October 2001	Core Design	Microsoft Windows, PlayStation 2	
Project I.G.I.	15 December 2000	Innerloop Studios	Microsoft Windows	
Project Snowblind	23 February 2005	Crystal Dynamics	Microsoft Windows, PlayStation 2, Xbox	
R-Type Final	2 February 2004	Irem	PlayStation 2	
Race – The Official WTCC Game	24 November 2006	SimBin	Microsoft Windows	
Republic: The Revolution	27 August 2003	Elixir Studios	Microsoft Windows	
Reservoir Dogs	25 August 2006	Volatile Games	Microsoft Windows, PlayStation 2, Xbox	
Resident Evil – Code: Veronica	26 May 2000	Capcom	Dreamcast	
Resident Evil 3: Nemesis	22 September 1999	Capcom	Microsoft Windows	
Revenant	26 October 1999	Cinematix Studios	Microsoft Windows	
Ripley's Believe It or Not!: The Riddle of Master Lu	1997	Sanctuary Woods	Microsoft Windows	
Rogue Trooper	21 April 2006	Rebellion Developments	Microsoft Windows, PlayStation 2, Wii, Xbox	
Salt Lake 2002	18 January 2002	Attention to Detail	Microsoft Windows, PlayStation 2	
Shellshock	30 June 1996	Core Design	Microsoft Windows	
Shellshock: Nam '67	3 September 2004	Guerrilla Games	Microsoft Windows, PlayStation 2, Xbox	
Shellshock 2: Blood Trails	13 February 2009	Rebellion Developments	Microsoft Windows, PlayStation 3, Xbox 360	
Singles: Flirt Up Your Life	5 October 2004	Rotobee	Microsoft Windows	
Smart Bomb	10 May 2005	Core Design	PlayStation Portable	
Soccer '97	March 1997	Silicon Dreams Studio	PlayStation	
SolaRola	August 2007	Progressive Media	J2ME, BREW, iOS, Android	
Soul Bubbles	13 June 2008	Mekensleep	Nintendo DS	
Soul Reaver 2	20 November 2001	Crystal Dynamics	Microsoft Windows, PlayStation 2	
Spawn: In the Demon's Hand	19 January 2001	Capcom	Dreamcast	
Speed Demons	1997	Efecto Caos S.L., East Point Software Ltd.	Microsoft Windows	
Stacked with Daniel Negreanu	16 February 2007	3G Studios	PlayStation Portable	
Startopia	15 June 2001	Mucky Foot Productions	Microsoft Windows	
Swagman	July 1997	Core Design	PlayStation, Sega Saturn	
Sword of the Berserk: Guts' Rage	29 February 2000	Yuke's	Dreamcast	
Swingerz Golf	23 October 2002	Telenet Japan	GameCube	
Sydney 2000	31 July 2000	Attention to Detail	Dreamcast, Microsoft Windows, PlayStation	
Terracide	31 August 1997	Simis	Microsoft Windows	
Test Drive Off-Road	28 February 1997	Accolade	PlayStation	
The Incredible Hulk: The Pantheon Saga	December 1996	Marvel Comics	PlayStation, Sega Saturn	
The Italian Job	25 June 2003	Climax Group	GameCube, PlayStation 2, Xbox	
The Misadventures of Tron Bonne	16 June 2000	Capcom	PlayStation	
The Unholy War	30 September 1998	Crystal Dynamics	PlayStation	
Thief: The Dark Project	30 November 1998	Looking Glass Studios	Microsoft Windows	
Thief II: The Metal Age	21 March 2000	Looking Glass Studios	Microsoft Windows	
Thief: Deadly Shadows	25 May 2004	Ion Storm	Microsoft Windows, Xbox	
Three Kingdoms: Fate of the Dragon	9 March 2001	Object	Microsoft Windows	
Thunderhawk: Operation Phoenix	12 October 2001	Core Design	PlayStation 2	
Timeline	10 November 2000	Timeline Computer Entertainment	Microsoft Windows	
TimeSplitters	23 October 2000	Free Radical Design	PlayStation 2	
TimeSplitters 2	9 October 2002	Free Radical Design	GameCube, PlayStation 2, Xbox	
Tom and Jerry Tales	8 December 2006	Sensory Sweep Studios	Game Boy Advance	
Tomb Raider	25 October 1996	Core Design	Microsoft Windows, PlayStation, Sega Saturn	
Tomb Raider II	18 November 1997	Core Design	Microsoft Windows, PlayStation	
Tomb Raider III	20 November 1998	Core Design	Microsoft Windows, PlayStation	
Tomb Raider: The Last Revelation	22 November 1999	Core Design	Dreamcast, Microsoft Windows, PlayStation	
Tomb Raider (GBC)	12 June 2000	Core Design	Game Boy Color	
Tomb Raider: Chronicles	17 November 2000	Core Design	Dreamcast, Microsoft Windows, PlayStation	
Tomb Raider: Curse of the Sword	1 July 2001	Core Design	Game Boy Color	
Tomb Raider: The Prophecy	12 November 2002	Core Design	Game Boy Advance	
Tomb Raider: The Angel of Darkness	20 June 2003	Core Design	Microsoft Windows, PlayStation 2	
Tomb Raider: Legend	7 April 2006	Crystal Dynamics	GameCube, Microsoft Windows, PlayStation 2, PlayStation Portable, Xbox, Xbox 360, Xbox One (via Backwards Compatibility.)	
Tomb Raider: Anniversary	1 June 2007	Crystal Dynamics	Microsoft Windows, PlayStation 2, PlayStation 3, PlayStation Portable, Xbox 360, Xbox One (via Backwards Compatibility.)	
Tomb Raider: Underworld	18 November 2008	Crystal Dynamics	Microsoft Windows, PlayStation 2, PlayStation 3, Wii, Xbox 360, Xbox One (via Backwards Compatibility.)	
Top Trumps: Doctor Who	16 May 2008	Rockpool Games	Microsoft Windows, Nintendo DS, PlayStation 2, Wii	
Total Overdose	16 September 2005	Deadline Games	Microsoft Windows, PlayStation 2, Xbox	
Touch the Dead	15 May 2007	Dream On Studio	Nintendo DS	
Trade Empires	17 September 2001	Frog City Software	Microsoft Windows	
UEFA Champions League Season 1998/99	26 March 1999	Silicon Dreams Studio	Microsoft Windows, PlayStation	
Urban Chaos	30 November 1999	Mucky Foot Productions	Dreamcast, Microsoft Windows, PlayStation	
Urban Chaos: Riot Response	19 May 2006	Rocksteady Studios	PlayStation 2, Xbox	
Virtual Golf	23 August 1996	Core Design	PlayStation, Sega Saturn	
Walt Disney World Quest: Magical Racing Tour	23 March 2000	Crystal Dynamics	Dreamcast, PlayStation	
Warzone 2100	10 April 1999	Pumpkin Studios	Microsoft Windows, PlayStation	
Wave Rally	26 November 2001	Opus Studio Inc.	PlayStation 2	
Way of the Samurai	13 September 2002	Acquire	PlayStation 2	
Whiplash	18 November 2003	Crystal Dynamics	PlayStation 2, Xbox	
World League Soccer 98	May 1998	Silicon Dreams Studio	Microsoft Windows	
World War II: Panzer Claws	14 November 2002	Zuxxez Entertainment	Microsoft Windows	
Zendoku	20 April 2007	Zoonami	Nintendo DS, PlayStation Portable	
