= Homegrown Player Rule (England) =

English Premier League initiative

The Homegrown Player Rule is an initiative of the English Premier League to allow for more domestic players to be developed from an earlier age in the hope of nurturing more homegrown talent. It forms part of the League's Elite Player Performance Plan. The Premier League proposed a maximum of 17 non-"homegrown" players in each club squad, and the squad size is a maximum of 25. This means that in a full squad of 25 players, there must be at least eight homegrown players. Greg Dyke, the former chairman of the Football Association (FA), wanted to implement much stronger regulation of foreign players. His intention was to help England to win the 2022 World Cup in Qatar, as he stated in an op-ed piece.

Some of the most significant of Dyke's 2015 proposals included:

- Homegrown players in a top-flight 25-man squad be increased from eight to 12 two of whom must be brought up in the team's youth system
- Tightening the definition of what it is to be a homegrown player. As a consequence, fewer foreign-born players would qualify

== Foreign-born, home-grown ==
Currently, to be classified as homegrown one must be on an English team for at least three years before the age of twenty-one which Dyke wanted to reduce to eighteen. This would mean that a teenager would have to start at the club by the age of fifteen at the latest and, since players are not allowed to move across national boundaries before sixteen (except under exceptional circumstances), this would mean fewer foreign players could qualify as homegrown.

Each season the Premier League lists the squads for each of its clubs for the season on 1 September (after the summer transfer window closes). Each club is able to list up to 17 senior players that are not English or Welsh and did not spend a significant period in an English or Welsh academy, plus any number of homegrown players up to a maximum squad size of 25, plus an unlimited number of academy and under-21 players. For example, the list for 2017 contained a number of homegrown players who were not English or Welsh born or qualified, including Chelsea's Cesc Fàbregas (Spain) and Victor Moses (Nigeria), Manchester United's Paul Pogba (France) and Romelu Lukaku (Belgium), and Arsenal's Héctor Bellerín (Spain).

== Brexit ==
Miles Jacobson, director of Sports Interactive, the company behind the Football Manager video game series, suggested that some EU-born players will not get work permits to work in the Premier League after Brexit. 152 current Premier League players who were born in the EU would probably not get a work permit if they are subjected to the same rules as non-EU players. Of the players who would not automatically qualify for work permits, they may qualify via the Football Association's Exceptions Panel. Some football lobby groups are using the tax paid by footballers as a reason to press for an exclusion for EU players - while the opposite view was the basis for Dyke's original proposal, that by reducing foreign born players there would be more room for English players.

Since Brexit, clubs will not be able to sign players from overseas until they are 18. With this rule, overseas players can still become homegrown if they are signed at 18 years old and evolve 3 years on an English team, such as William Saliba.

== Post-Brexit ==
The implementation of the Governing Body Endorsement (GBE) system following Brexit has led to significant challenges for Premier League clubs. Since the United Kingdom's formal departure from the European Union on December 31, 2020, clubs have expressed widespread dissatisfaction with the current rules. The consensus among the 20 Premier League clubs is that the system, which was intended to balance the recruitment of international talent with the development of English players, is restrictive and drives up transfer prices. This, in turn, is seen as detrimental to the business of football in the top flight.

Despite the original intent of the GBE system to protect opportunities for homegrown talent, Premier League clubs have increasingly called for a relaxation of these rules. The Football Association (FA) has acknowledged these concerns but remains focused on its objective of nurturing domestic players.

In response to these challenges, new rules were introduced in the summer of 2023 to provide clubs with more flexibility. Premier League and Championship clubs can now sign up to four overseas players per season who do not meet the standard GBE criteria. This adjustment is part of a broader effort to give clubs additional access to exceptional international talent while still incentivizing the development of English players. The FA has indicated that these changes will be reviewed and potentially expanded if they prove successful.

This shift has resulted in increased recruitment of players from leagues in continents previously subject to greater restrictions, such as South America. These leagues are now considered to offer better value for money compared to many European leagues. The changes in recruitment patterns have been most noticeable in the Premier League, where clubs are looking to capitalize on this newly accessible talent pool.

The post-Brexit adjustments in player recruitment rules have also impacted the composition of Premier League academies. Reduced access to teenage overseas talent may provide more opportunities for British players in the long term, but it could also limit the quality and diversity of talent available in these academies. This has sparked debate among top managers and club officials about the potential long-term effects on the quality of English football.
