= Championship Manager 93/94 =

1993 video game

- Developer(s): Sports Interactive
- Publisher(s): Domark
- Designer(s): Paul Collyer, Oliver Collyer
- Series: Championship Manager
- Platform(s): PC, Amiga, Atari ST
- Release: 17 September 1993
- Genre(s): Sports
- Mode(s): Single-player, multiplayer

Championship Manager 93/94 is the second installment in the Championship Manager series of football management simulation video games. It was released a year after the first Championship Manager.

== New features ==
This game improved on the original in many ways, by far the most significant change was the use of real player names for the first time. This was the one major feature, which the game had lacked in comparison to its rivals. Other key features to be introduced in this game included the following:

- A list of selected foreign-based players that could be bought
- Much more in-match commentary
- Injury time
- More player awards
- Eight different background pictures
- Improved loading times
- The implementation of the FA Premier League

== Alternative versions ==
The CM93/94 engine was the basis for Championship Manager Italia. This was a version that simulated the top two divisions of Italian football (Serie A and Serie B). There was a 1995 seasonal update released for this game. There was also a little-known Norwegian-language version called Championship Manager Norge or CM Norge which simulated the Norwegian League. The 1993/94 Season Data Up-Date Disk was a seasonal update disk that updated the game's database to reflect player and club changes for the 1993/94 season. The End of 1994 Season Data Up-Date Disk was an end of season update disk that updated the game's database to reflect player and club changes for the end of 1993/94 season. The Championship Manager '94 - End of Season Data Disk, which was available on the Amiga, contained two fictional players added by developers of the game, Mark Collis and Ferah Orosco. They were a striker and a defender, respectively, for Cambridge United in Division 3 and are regarded as the first ever fictional super-players in the CM series.

== Sales ==
Championship Manager 93/94 and Championship Manager Italia sold a reported 90,000 collectively.
