= Football Manager 2013 =

2012 video game

- Developer: Sports Interactive
- Publisher: Sega
- Producer: Miles Jacobson
- Series: Football Manager
- Platforms: Microsoft Windows, OS X, PlayStation Portable, iOS, Android
- Release: Microsoft Windows, OS X: WW: 2 November 2012; PlayStation Portable: WW: 30 November 2012; iOS, Android: WW: 13 December 2012
- Genre: Sports management
- Modes: Single player, multiplayer

Football Manager 2013 is a football management simulation video game and the tenth instalment in the Football Manager series developed by Sports Interactive and published by Sega. It was released on Microsoft Windows and OS X on 2 November 2012. Football Manager Handheld 2013 was subsequently published for PlayStation Portable on 30 November, and for iOS and Android on 13 December.

== Gameplay ==
A simulated match between Birmingham City F.C. and Watford F.C. on the Microsoft Windows version of Football Manager 2013

Football Manager 2013 features similar gameplay to that of the Football Manager series. Gameplay consists of taking charge of a professional football team (the game also includes semi-professional, amateur, and international teams) as the manager. Players can sign football players to contracts, manage finances for the club, and give team talks to players. The Football Manager series is a simulation of real world management, with the player being judged on various factors by the club's AI owners and board.

Football Manager 2013 includes a quicker mode of play called "Football Manager Classic". This new mode allow gamers to complete a season in less time than the normal game mode. It retains the 3D match engine and player/staff database but simplifies the way players manage their club and allows them to focus on selected key areas to build success. A player can complete a season in approximately seven hours of gameplay. Football Manager 2013 also includes a number of pre-set challenges, offering players scenarios designed to test their management skills over a set period of time, usually half a season. The challenges replicate a variety of real world circumstances. On 19 December 2012, two new challenges were added to the in-game store.

== Release ==
On 6 September 2012, Football Manager 2013 was officially announced via a mock press conference video on Sports Interactive's YouTube channel. It was confirmed the game would include over 900 new features, including a new mode called "Football Manager Classic". Release was slated as prior to the Christmas holiday season. On 27 September 2012, it was announced that the game would be released at midnight on 2 November 2012. On 18 October 2012, a fully playable beta version was provided to customers who pre-ordered either the digital version (via Steam) or physical versions (from selected retailers). Save data from the beta was compatible with the final version. On 26 October 2012, a game demo was made available.

== Reception ==
Reception

Aggregate score
Aggregator	Score
Metacritic	PC: 86/100 iOS: 81/100

Review scores
Publication	Score
Eurogamer	9/10
GameSpot	8/10
IGN	9/10
PC Gamer (US)	88/100
PC PowerPlay	9/10
VideoGamer.com	8/10

Football Manager 2013 received very positive reviews, including the highest ever Metacritic score for a Football Manager game, with a score of 86/100.

== Sales ==
As of 31 March 2013, the game had sold 940,000 copies in the United States and Europe.

== See also ==
- Business simulation game
