= Football Manager 27 =

- Cover art
- Developer: Sports Interactive
- Publisher: Sega
- Series: Football Manager
- Engine: Unity
- Platforms: Windows; macOS; PlayStation 5; Xbox Series X/S; Mobile (via Netflix); Apple Arcade
- Release: 10 November 2026
- Genre: Sports management
- Modes: Single-player, multiplayer

Football Manager 27 (FM27) is a football management simulation video game developed by Sports Interactive and published by Sega. It was released on 10 November 2026 for Windows, macOS, PlayStation 5, and Xbox Series X/S, with a mobile version for Android and iOS available through Netflix.

== Gameplay ==
FM27 follows Football Manager 26 and continues the series' transition to the Unity engine. The game features a redesigned user interface that changes navigation, reduces the number of steps required to access information, and adds further options for customising screens, bookmarks and shortcuts. Sports Interactive has also announced changes to the match-day experience and the wider game world, including improvements to crowds, stadiums, weather, lighting and other visual elements. In order to gather more player feedback during the development of FM27, Sports Interactive invited players to apply to become playtesters, who gained access to early development builds. As part of a new partnership between Sega and the French Football Federation, the Arkema Première Ligue is fully licensed in FM27, bringing official logos, kits, and player faces to the game. The Roshn Saudi League is also fully licensed, bringing the total number of playable nations to 59. FM27 is the first in the series to include the option to play in the Indonesian language for PC, Console and Touch after being introduced initially in FM26 Mobile.

On 27 October, a new online multiplayer mode called "Shuffle Draft" was revealed, supporting anywhere from 2 to 32 players, and developed in partnership with FIFAe. Players will start by drafting their teams from a customizable player pool, before managing their teams in a tournament, which can be structured as a knockout cup, group stage and knockout cup, or a full season-long league.

FM27 also includes the option for your in-game character to use a wheelchair, and scenes in-game have been made accessible, including with the use of ramps.

== Release ==
FM27 had a free-to-play Launch Preview from 29 October until 3 November, which was the full game without any limits on gameplay. Afterwards, the Launch Preview continued for people who have pre-ordered the game, from 3 November until the full release happened on 10 November.

== Reception ==
Reception

Aggregate scores
Aggregator	Score
Metacritic	(PC) 80/100
OpenCritic	85% recommend

The PC version of Football Manager 27 has received generally favorable reviews from critics, according to Metacritic, a review aggregation website. Fellow review aggregator OpenCritic assessed that the game received strong approval, being recommended by 85% of critics.

Barry Collins, writing for Forbes, praised the game as a return to form: "Poor interface decisions have been largely rectified, the immersion in the game world that was lacking in FM26 has returned, the ever-divisive match engine graphics have improved." He praised subtle improvements in graphics during matches, including the new time of day shadow system, and weather effects. He also said the game brings the good parts of FM24 and FM26 together. Art de Roché, writing for The Athletic, said he had encountered far fewer bugs than in FM26, and that "More match-engine-specific changes were noticeable". He ended his review by saying that FM27 is a clear step-forward from FM26. Niall Walsh, writing for TheGamer, said FM27 is the best game in the series, but also highlighted issues with the match engine, including the large number of offside goals.
