= Football Manager 2012 =

2011 association football management simulation video game

- Developer: Sports Interactive
- Publisher: Sega
- Producer: Miles Jacobson
- Series: Football Manager
- Platforms: Microsoft Windows, Mac OS X, PlayStation Portable, iOS Android
- Release: Microsoft Windows: NA: 21 October 2011; Mac OS X: NA: 21 October 2011
- Genre: Sports management
- Modes: Single player, multiplayer

Football Manager 2012 is a football management simulation video game and the ninth instalment in the Football Manager series developed by Sports Interactive and published by Sega. It was released on Microsoft Windows and Mac OS X on 21 October 2011.

== Gameplay ==
Football Manager 2012 features similar gameplay to that of the Football Manager series. Gameplay consists of taking charge of a professional football team (the game also includes semi-professional, amateur, and international teams) as the manager. Players can sign football players to contracts, manage finances for the club, and give team talks to players. The Football Manager series is a simulation of real world management, with the player being judged on various factors by the club's AI owners and board. Football Manager 2012 added increased levels of scouting, including the amount of information a scout would bring back for in-game players. The largest new addition to the game was the ability to add or remove playable leagues from the game at the end of every season (previously, once leagues were selected, they were not able to be changed).

== Release ==
A demo of the game was released on Steam in association with Sky Sports HD on 6 October 2011. It provides half of a season of gameplay, which can be continued within the full purchased version. The demo is limited to only the leagues of England, Scotland, France, Spain, Holland, Belgium, Italy, Norway, Denmark, Sweden, and Australia, which are playable as quick-starts.

=== Digital rights management ===
Football Manager 2012 is the first in the series to require the use of Steam software; this angered many thousands of fans of the series. The move means that users must activate the game online before they are able to play. Sega indicated that the change was intended to reduce piracy.

== Reception ==
Reception

Aggregate score
Aggregator	Score
Metacritic	PC: 84/100; PSP: 66/100 iOS: 84/100

Review scores
Publication	Score
Eurogamer	8/10
GameSpot	8/10
IGN	9/10
The Daily Telegraph	9/10

According to media review aggregator website Metacritic, Football Manager 2012 received "generally positive reviews". GameSpot said that the "ability to turn leagues off and on was a great addition". The German website 4players.de rated the game with 88% as "sehr gut" ("very good").

== See also ==
- Business simulation game
