= Football Manager 2014 =

2013 association football management simulation video game

- Developer(s): Sports Interactive
- Publisher(s): Sega
- Producer(s): Miles Jacobson
- Series: Football Manager
- Platform(s): Microsoft Windows, OS X, Linux, iOS, Android, PlayStation Vita
- Release: Microsoft Windows, OS X, Linux: WW: 30 October 2013; iOS, Android: WW: 14 November 2013; PlayStation Vita: WW: 11 April 2014
- Genre(s): Sports management
- Mode(s): Single player, multiplayer

Football Manager 2014 is football management simulation video game and the eleventh instalment in the Football Manager series developed by Sports Interactive and published by Sega. It was released on Microsoft Windows, OS X, and Linux on 30 October 2013. A handheld version titled Football Manager Handheld 2014 was released for iOS and Android on 14 November 2013. A PlayStation Vita version titled Football Manager Classic 2014 was released on 11 April 2014.

== Gameplay ==
Football Manager 2014 features similar gameplay to that of the Football Manager series. Gameplay consists of taking charge of a professional football team (the game also includes semi-professional, amateur, and international teams) as the manager. Players can sign football players to contracts, manage finances for the club, and give team talks to players. The Football Manager series is a simulation of real world management, with the player being judged on various factors by the club's AI owners and board.

Football Manager 2014 features a revamped transfer module where opposing clubs and managers adopt a more realistic approach when making or responding to transfer offers. In addition, a number of new real world transfer clauses have been added, such as the ability to loan a player back to the club he has just been bought from and the option to offer a combination of cash and loan players, as well as new contract clauses such as a sub bench appearance fee. The old turn-based system of transfer negotiations can now be done two ways: the tried and tested system and a new live system, similar to that used in Football Manager's contract negotiations.

Interaction between players, managers, their rivals and the media has been improved. For example, members of the coaching staff now offer feedback on how reserve and youth team players are performing. Managers can also ask key players to have a word with unhappy squad members, while the introduction of an end-of-season meeting allows the manager to let the squad know how they have performed and set targets for the coming season. Contract negotiations are more realistic in the game, as managers and boards can now make demands and lay down their visions for the club in both initial job interviews and contract renewal discussions. Managers can attempt to renegotiate transfer and wage budgets as a reward for staying loyal if they've been offered a job by another club, with the outcome helping to aid their decision on whether to move or not.

The news system has been overhauled so managers can now deal with many club matters directly from their inbox. In addition, news is now colour-coded, based on category, and contains more detail – for example, scout reports now appear as a single news item with a top-line report on all players scouted and the facility to short-list or make an offer for each of these players. For the first time in the series, star players have a testimonial after they have been at the club for a certain period of time or when they announce their retirement. The match engine features extensive improvements, including enhanced AI, improved lighting and player animation, individual player character and kit models, more realistic player reaction to on-field incidents, and a range of optimisations. Creation of tactics, selection and implementation with player roles and team strategies, definable roles for players for multiple positions, new player roles and instructions, and improvements to rival managers' AI have been overhauled so that they adapt their tactics more readily over time.

== Development ==
The game was announced on 14 August 2013 on Football Manager's official website. A beta version of the game was available for download two weeks prior to the game is released, exclusive to those who pre-order The PlayStation Vita version is titled Football Manager Classic 2014; unlike other handheld versions of the previous instalments in the series, it includes the 3D match engine. This version is designed for quicker game progress than the Microsoft Windows version. One of the new features of Football Manager 2014 is the Football Manager 2014 Steam Workshop. The player can search many free content from Football Manager Steam Workshop and download it and share their own to the Football Manager Steam Workshop. For example, the user can share their tactics, their favourite skins, league and data updates, kits, challenges, views, filters, shortlists, match plans, versus mode teams, facepacks, logos, and custom database options. The Football Manager 2014 Steam Workshop is like a social site of the people who play Football Manager 2014. In the Football Manager 2014 Steam Workshop, the player can discuss Football Manager 2014 with all the othe rplayers, subscribe items they like to their friends, see their friend's favourite items, and follow their favourite authors.

== Reception ==
Reception

Aggregate score
Aggregator	Score
Metacritic	(PC) 85/100 (VITA) 67/100

Football Manager 2014 received mostly positive reviews. The Microsoft Windows version of the game has received 85/100 on Metacritic. On 12 February 2014, it was announced that the game was nominated for a BAFTA in the Best Sports Game category. GameZone's Jake Valentine gave it an 8.5/10, stating: "It's not always fun to look at spreadsheets for hours upon hours in a video game, even if it is your kind of thing. Yet Football Manager 14 finds a way to make it fun."'

=== Sales ===
As of 31 March 2014, the game had sold 790,000 copies in Europe and North America. By 2017, Football Manager 2014 had sold over one million copies since release. Miles Jackobson of Sports Interactive stated that Football Manager 2017 had sold one million copies, and the series had "5(th) game(s) in a row".

== See also ==
- Business simulation game
