= Football Manager 2015 =

2014 association football management simulation video game

- Developer: Sports Interactive
- Publisher: Sega
- Series: Football Manager
- Platforms: Microsoft Windows, OS X, Linux, iOS, Android
- Release: Microsoft Windows, OS X, Linux; 7 November 2014 iOS, Android; 20 November 2014
- Genre: Sports management
- Modes: Single player, multiplayer

Football Manager 2015 is a football management simulation video game and the twelfth instalment in the Football Manager series developed by Sports Interactive and published by Sega. It was released on Microsoft Windows, OS X, and Linux platforms on 7 November 2014, and on iOS and Android platforms on 20 November 2014.

== Gameplay ==
Football Manager 2015 features similar gameplay to that of the Football Manager series. Gameplay consists of taking charge of a professional football team (the game also includes semi-professional, amateur, and international teams) as the manager. Players can sign football players to contracts, manage finances for the club, and give team talks to players. The Football Manager series is a simulation of real world management, with the player being judged on various factors by the club's AI owners and board.

Football Manager 2015 offers a variety of new features such as being the first game of the franchise to include Twitch integration so players can stream their game online. There has also been an overhaul in the match engine, adding 2,000 new animations into the game, improved ball physics, and improved shots, passes, and long balls. The player models have been updated along with a brand new lighting model. Football Manager 2015 featured a complete redesign of the game's interface, introducing a new sidebar. Managers now choose between being a tracksuit manager or a tactical manager when designing a new avatar. A tracksuit manager specialises in training and on the field knowledge, while a tactical manager specialises in tactics, formations, and player morale.

== Reception ==
Reception

Aggregate score
Aggregator	Score
Metacritic	PC: 80/100 (Handheld) iOS: 72/100 (Classic) iOS: 85/100

Review scores
Publication	Score
Eurogamer	6/10
GameSpot	8/10
IGN	8.9/10
PC Gamer (US)	61/100
The Daily Telegraph	4/5
TouchArcade	(Classic) iOS: 5/5

Football Manager 2015 received "generally favourable reviews" according to media review aggregator website Metacritic. Reviews were mostly positive, arguing that it is an improvement of its predecessor but criticised the game's new match engine, stating there are more defensive blunders than Football Manager 2014. There were also problems faced by many users that reduced the quality of the gameplay which even until now, still has not been improved. One of the most common algorithmic problem faced by people is the demand of first team players for first team chances. Some players complained about their first team appearance to be very limited even though they just signed for the team and the season just began. A new player that was signed recently asked for first team chances even though there are still many matches to be played yet. This algorithmic programming was a stumbling block for most customers as they have to either comply or sell that particular player.

== See also ==
- Business simulation game
