= Championship Manager 2010 =

2009 video game

- Championship Manager 2010 box art
- Developer: Beautiful Game Studios
- Publisher: Eidos Interactive
- Series: Championship Manager
- Platforms: Microsoft Windows, Mac OS X Java ME
- Release: EU: September 11, 2009
- Genre: Sports management

Championship Manager 2010 is a football management simulation video game developed by Beautiful Game Studios and published by Eidos Interactive. It was released for Microsoft Windows on 11 September 2009, making it the second Championship Manager game to be released alongside Football Manager since Championship Manager 2007. The Mac OS X version of the game was shipped from Virtual Programming on 23 November 2009.

== Features ==
The football management game developed by Beautiful Game Studios offers several notable features to enhance the gameplay experience. One of these features is the set piece creator, which allows players to create set pieces and utilize their squad members' strengths to produce a successful free kick. The set piece creator adds a strategic layer to the game by breaking down the set piece into multiple stages.

Players can access a world map view of their knowledge of different countries and allocation of expenditures, while scouts provide updates on up-and-coming star players from around the world. This feature enables players to make informed decisions regarding scouting and recruitment. Drills can be set up to test players' skills in various areas, such as shooting, crossing, and practice matches, allowing players to improve their team's performance in weak areas.

The game has a dynamically updated display window that shows league tables, fixtures, top goal scorers, and other essential information in real-time, providing players with a comprehensive overview of the game. Global coverage appearing throughout the game ensures that players stay up-to-date with the latest developments in football worldwide. Pro-Zone is another feature that allows players to access post-match analysis on their players, including full stats on their own team and the opposition. This feature enables players to analyze their performance, identify areas of improvement, and strategize for future games.

== Development ==
Originally named Championship Manager 2009, the game was renamed due to a change in release dates from April 2009 to 11 September 2009. Championship Manager 2010 is the first game in the series to have a two-year development time. This is due to recent versions in the series not being critically successful for the publisher, which admitted that the franchise had lost direction in recent years and that they were determined to make the game a "strong alternative" to Sega's Football Manager. On 18 August 2009, Eidos Interactive announced fans would be able to buy the game for as little as 1 pence along with a £2.50 transaction fee. This is the first time any video games publisher has done this.

== Reception ==
Reception

Aggregate score
Aggregator	Score
GameRankings	71%

Championship Manager 2010 received more positive reviews than previous versions of the Championship Manager series. Eurogamer gave the game an 8 out of 10, stating: "For the first time, the Championship Manager series is a viable alternative to Football Manager... CM10's attempts to innovate must be applauded, and the majority of its refinements are either solid additions or real winners." MSN UK also applauded the game and concluded: "Once you get stuck into a season, it is fearsome addictive, and all aspects of football management are present and correct, if not necessarily developed to Football Manager's level of sophistication. It is a lot more forgiving than Football Manager ... If that doesn't bother you, it's worth considering for the first time in years."

Now Gamer gave the game a 7.3 out of 10, concluding that "Championship Manager 2010 – particularly with its impressive highlights engine – manages to land a good few solid punches, and gives the Sports Interactive team something to genuinely mull over. For Championship Manager, it is now in the finest shape it's been in for half a decade, and there are more solid foundations for next year's edition to be built on." The Guardian gave the game 4 out 5 stars and concluded: "If you seek a straight-down-the-line football management experience that tests your powers of wheeler-dealing, man-management, tactics and training, then you will find Championship Manager thoroughly satisfying ... At last, the beloved old stager has found a hint of its previous form."

=== Sales ===
Roy Meredith, the general manager of Beautiful Game Studios, stated that the "Pay What You Want" promotion for Championship Manager 2010 had "exceeded" expectations. In its first two weeks of release. the game held the No. 1 spot in the PC Retail charts. In its third week, the game slipped to No. 2. After over four months of being sold, the game dropped out of the top 10 retail PC Games chart.

== See also ==
- Football Manager 2010
