= Football Manager 2018 =

2017 association football management simulation video game

- Developer: Sports Interactive
- Publisher: Sega
- Series: Football Manager
- Platforms: Microsoft Windows, macOS, Linux, Nintendo Switch, iOS, Android
- Release: Microsoft Windows, iOS, Android: WW: 10 November 2017; Nintendo Switch: WW: 13 April 2018
- Genre: Sports management
- Modes: Single player, multiplayer

Football Manager 2018 is a football management simulation video game and the fifteenth instalment in the Football Manager series developed by Sports Interactive and published by Sega. It was released worldwide on 10 November 2017 for Microsoft Windows, macOS, and Linux. The Nintendo Switch version by Lab42 was released on 13 April 2018. For the first time in the series, all three versions of the game (Football Manager 2018 for Microsoft Windows, macOS, and Linux, Football Manager Touch 2018 for Microsoft Windows, macOS, Linux, iOS, and Android, and Football Manager Mobile 2018 for iOS and Android) were all released on the same day.

== Gameplay ==
Football Manager 2018 features similar gameplay to that of the Football Manager series. Gameplay consists of taking charge of a professional football team (the game also includes semi-professional, amateur, and international teams) as the team manager. Players can sign football players to contracts, manage finances for the club, and give team talks to players. The Football Manager series is a simulation of real world management, with the player being judged on various factors by the club's AI owners and board.

== Development ==
Football Manager 2018 was developed by Sports Interactive and published by Sega. The first details of new features and upgrades in Football Manager 2018 would not be announced until late September 2017, with Football Manager Touch additions following in October 2017 via the game's official website and social media channels. New editions of the football game included updated squads and kits, and improvements to the match engine, among other features. Players who pre-purchased Football Manager 2018 through a Sega-approved digital retailer would be able to start pre-season at least two weeks prior to the official street date through a fully playable beta version. Single-player careers started in the beta can be also continued in the full game. A screenshot from the beta-build of the game confirmed that the possibility for players to come out as homosexual was added for Football Manager 2018; only computer-generated players can possibly come out, not already existing ones, and such an occurrence results in a small news report and a boost in revenue.

== Featured leagues ==
Football Manager 2018 contained the same 51 playable leagues as Football Manager 2017 during release but the Indonesian league is reduced from three playable levels to two playable levels. The English league has the most playable levels (up to 6) while the Swedish league has the most playable divisions (up to 10). The total number of playable divisions is 147 (116 levels, 52 countries), with over 2,500 clubs available.

== Release ==
Football Manager 2018 was launched for Microsoft Windows, macOS, and Linux on 10 November 2017. For the first time, the mobile and tablet versions Football Manager Mobile 2018 and Football Manager Touch 2018 were all launched simultaneously with the desktop version, as they also arrived on 10 November 2017. Players who had previous versions of the series could get up to a 25% discount on the game on pre-ordering. Football Manager Touch 2018 was later released for the Nintendo Switch on 13 April 2018.

== Reception ==
Reception

Aggregate score
Aggregator	Score
Metacritic	PC: 82/100; NS: 77/100

Review scores
Publication	Score
Eurogamer	Recommended
GameSpot	9/10
GamesRadar+	3/5
Nintendo Life	(Touch) NS: 8/10
Nintendo World Report	(Touch) NS: 7/10
PC Gamer (US)	89/100
PCGamesN	9/10
Trusted Reviews	4/5
TouchArcade	(Touch) iOS: 5/5

Football Manager 2018 for Microsoft Windows and Football Manager 2018 Touch for Nintendo Switch received "generally favorable" reviews according to Metacritic, a review aggregator. Eurogamer wrote positively about the game's day one polish and the small iterations made to it from last year's entry, stating: "In the end it's a combination of doing a handful of new things well and avoiding a long list of prior release day issues that earns Football Manager 2018 the privilege of a veteran player's time all over again." PCGamesN awarded the game a nine out of ten, writing; "In general, what all of this adds up to is a more sensitive game. All of the depth is there as before, but the humanity of football is represented in a greater way..." GamesRadar+ praised the improvements made to the 3D match engine and criticised the user interface and dynamics system. PC Gamer gave the game a score of 89/100, saying the game is the most ambitious instalment yet from the previous versions. GameSpot gave the game a 9/10, talking about how the dynamics broadens with the ways the user interact with their team, more information about how and why their players are injured allows them to adjust, the increased scouting makes unearthing hidden gems more rewarding, and also a slew of new player animations and increased intelligence improves the 3D match engine.

== See also ==
- Business simulation game
