= Football Manager 2005 =

2004 video game

- Developer: Sports Interactive
- Publisher: Sega
- Series: Football Manager
- Platforms: Windows, Mac OS X
- Release: EU: 5 November 2004; NA: 8 December 2004
- Genre: Sports management
- Modes: Single player, multiplayer over Internet (TCP/IP) or hot-seat

Football Manager 2005, known as Worldwide Soccer Manager 2005 in North America, is a football management simulation video game and the first instalment in the Football Manager series developed by Sports Interactive and published by Sega built on top of the code of Championship Manager 4, which Sports Interactive legally owned the rights to. It was released for Microsoft Windows and Mac OS X on 4 November 2004 in Europe and on 8 December 2004 in North America.

Football Manager 2005 was the first game from Sports Interactive that was published in North America and was succeeded by Football Manager 2006. It competed directly with Championship Manager 5, the severely delayed and widely slated effort from Eidos Interactive-funded Beautiful Game Studios. The Mac OS X version of game came on the same dual format disk as the Microsoft Windows version, so its sales were also included. Football Manager 2005 became the fifth fastest-selling PC game of all time according to Chart-Track, as well as the fastest selling game from Sega Europe at the time.

== Development ==
Tensions grew between Sports Interactive and their publisher Eidos Interactive during the troubled development of Championship Manager 4. Sports Interactive feared that they were about to be replaced, so they prepared for a split. It later turned out to be a misunderstanding. Sports Interactive redeemed themselves with the season update Championship Manager: Season 03/04, where they got things to what they wanted Championship Manager 4 to be; the mutual decision to separate had already been announced before the release of Championship Manager 4.

On 12 February 2004, after splitting from publishers Eidos Interactive, it was announced that Sports Interactive, producers of the Championship Manager games, had acquired the Football Manager brand and would henceforth release their games under that name, whilst the Championship Manager series would go on but no longer be related to Sports Interactive. Sports Interactive retained the rights to the code and all data from Championship Manager up until Championship Manager: Season 03/04 and based Football Manager 2005 on that.

== Gameplay ==
Football Manager 2005 compared to the previous managing game from Sports Interactive, Championship Manager: Season 03/04, included an updated user interface, a refined game engine, updated database and competition rules, pre- and post-match information, international player news, cup summary news, 2D clips from agents, coach reports on squads, job centre for non-playing positions, mutual contract termination, enhanced player loan options, manager mind games, and various other features. Gameplay consists of taking charge of a professional football team (the game also includes semi-professional, amateur, and international teams) as the manager. Players can sign football players to contracts, manage finances for the club, and give team talks to players. The Football Manager series is a simulation of real world management, with the player being judged on various factors by the club's AI owners and board.

== Copyright issues ==
Because of various copyright disputes and restrictions, certain alterations had to be made to the game data, which took away some of the famous realism known from Sports Interactive and their previous football manager simulation Championship Manager. Due to the way these data changes have been made (using simple instructions in plain-text files called EDT files and LNC files), almost all of the above changes could be easily reversed, many of them by simply deleting the appropriate file. Copyrights issues meant that the names of all French league teams had to be changed from their full names to simply the name of the city they represent. For example, Paris Saint-Germain became Paris and Olympique Marseille became Marseille. The names of Japanese league teams were also changed to completely fictional names such as Niitsu Unicorn and Katano Blaze, and the name of the Japanese J.League was changed to the N-League or Nihon League. The names of the major European trophies were changed to fictional names. The European Cup or Champions League became the Champions Cup, the UEFA Cup became the Euro Cup, and the Intertoto Cup became the Euro Vase.

The Germany national football team never picks real players and instead only ever use greyed-out fictional players. The name of the famous German goalkeeper Oliver Kahn had to be removed from the game and was replaced with the name Jens Mustermann (Mustermann translates from German into English as Sample Man and is the German equivalent of John Doe or Joe Bloggs, a placeholder name). This is because Kahn does not allow his image or name to be used in certain computer games and it is speculated that his name was changed to Jens in this game (the name of his main goalkeeping rival Jens Lehmann) as a light-hearted dig at Kahn.

== Chinese controversy ==
Football Manager 2005 was banned in China when it was found that places such as Tibet and Taiwan were included as separate countries in imported releases. China banned the game because it felt that it "threatened its content harmful to China's sovereignty and territorial integrity ... [that] seriously violates Chinese law and has been strongly protested by our nation's gamers". SEGA published a statement in reply, reporting that a Chinese version of the game, complete with Taiwan included as part of China, would be released. They also stated that the offending version was not translated into Chinese as it was not supposed to be released in China. The offending games were believed to have been imported or downloaded, written to CD, and boxed to be sold in illegal software shops in China.

== Reception ==
Reception

Aggregate scores
Aggregator	Score
GameRankings	89%
Metacritic	89/100

Review scores
Publication	Score
Eurogamer	9/10
GameSpot	8.6/10
Jeuxvideo.com	16/20
PC Format	90/100
PC Gamer (US)	90/100
VideoGamer.com	9/10
Inside Mac Games	7/10
Gamereactor (SE)	9/10
Gamereactor (DK)	7/10
Gamereactor (NO)	8/10
FZ	4+/5

Football Manager 2005 received favourable reviews from critics. Both GameRankings and Metacritic aggregators rate it at 89 out of 100. Kristan Reed of Eurogamer called it "a beautiful game of the beautiful game" and gave it a 9 out of 10. Brett Todd of GameSpot deemed it "every bit as thorough and addictive as its predecessors", giving it 8.6 out of 10, and remarked that this is the first time a game from Sports Interactive is being published in North America.

The Swedish Gamereactor called it "the real Championship Manager 5, albeit with a different name", and "the absolute pinnacle of the genre", giving it 9 out of 10. The Danish and Norwegian Gamereactor were a little less favourable, giving it a 7 and an 8, respectively. The Swedish FZ liked the fact that real-world local news like Expressen, Svenskafans.com, and Fotbolldirekt.com were in the game and added to the realism.

== Sales and accolades ==
Football Manager 2005 received a "Platinum" sales award from the Entertainment and Leisure Software Publishers Association (ELSPA), indicating sales of at least 300,000 copies in the United Kingdom. It also won the Sunday Times Reader Award for Games at the 2005 Bafta Game Awards.

== See also ==
- Business simulation game
- Championship Manager 5
- Football Manager (1982 series)
- Premier Manager
- Premier Manager 2004–2005
