= Championship Manager: Season 00/01 =

2000 video game

- Developer(s): Sports Interactive
- Publisher(s): Eidos Interactive
- Designer(s): Oliver Collyer, Paul Collyer, Marc Vaughan
- Series: Championship Manager
- Platform(s): Windows
- Release: 10 November 2000 (PC); 24 November 2000 (Mac)
- Genre(s): Sports

Championship Manager: Season 00/01 is a football management simulation video game.

== Gameplay ==
Ten more playable leagues were introduced for this version, including Australia, Finland, Greece, Northern Ireland, Russia, and Wales. It was also the first version of the game to come with an official data editor, something that has been continued for all subsequent versions.

== Release ==
The Daily Telegraph included a free copy of the game for participants in their Fantasy Football competition.

== Reception ==
Championship Manager: Season 00/01 received a "Platinum" sales award from the Entertainment and Leisure Software Publishers Association (ELSPA), indicating sales of at least 300,000 copies in the United Kingdom. During the 4th Annual Interactive Achievement Awards, the Academy of Interactive Arts & Sciences nominated Championship Manager for the "PC Sports" award.
