= Football Manager 2024 =

2023 association football management simulation video game

- Developer: Sports Interactive
- Publisher: Sega
- Series: Football Manager
- Platforms: Microsoft Windows, macOS, iOS, Android, Xbox One, Xbox Series X/S, PlayStation 5, iPad, Apple Arcade, Nintendo Switch
- Release: 6 November 2023
- Genre: Sports management
- Modes: Single player, multiplayer

Football Manager 2024 is a football management simulation video game and the twenty-first instalment in the Football Manager series developed by Sports Interactive and published by Sega. It was released on 6 November 2023. Football Manager 2024 Mobile was launched as a Netflix Games exclusive.

Football Manager 2024 was significant for two debuts in the Football Manager series. It was the first title in studio history to be released in Japan, and also included the fully-licensed J1, J2, and J3 Leagues from Japan. For the first time in the Football Manager series, players can transfer their save files over from their previous games in Football Manager 2023 and continue playing them in Football Manager 2024. This feature will continue in future releases, enabling Football Manager 2024 save files to be played in future editions. Those using this feature will be unable to unlock achievements.

== Awards and accolades ==
In February 2024, Football Manager 2024 officially became the most-played edition in the game's history, hitting the milestone of seven million players inside 100 days. On 7 March 2024, Football Manager 2024 was named Best UK PC game at the 2024 Ukie Video Game Awards. On the same day, it was shortlisted for Best British Game at the 2024 BAFTA Games Awards. In May 2024, Football Manager 2024 Mobile was shortlisted for Best Mobile Game at the Develop:Star Awards.

In September 2025, Sports Interactive studio director Miles Jacobson announced, in an interview with Eurogamer, that Football Manager 2024 had reached 19.09 million players. In October 2026, this number was updated to 20 million players.

== Future ==
A planned sequel, Football Manager 25, using the Unity game engine, was originally scheduled for release in November 2024, before being postponed to March 2025. The game was cancelled in February 2025, with the studio citing quality issues as the main contributing factor. On 13 August 2025, the next installment was announced with the title Football Manager 26, and was later given a release date of 4 November 2025.
