= Championship Manager 5 =

2005 video game

- Developer(s): Beautiful Game Studios; Gusto Games (PS2, Xbox)
- Publisher(s): Eidos Interactive
- Series: Championship Manager
- Platform(s): Microsoft Windows; PlayStation 2 Xbox
- Release: Microsoft Windows: UK: 18 March 2005; AU: 1 April 2005; PlayStation 2, Xbox: EU: 13 May 2005; AU: 16 May 2005 (PS2)
- Genre(s): Sports
- Mode(s): Single player,

Championship Manager 5 is the fifth installment of the popular Championship Manager of football management simulation video games. It is the first game in the series to be developed by Beautiful Game Studios after the much publicised split between Eidos Interactive and Sports Interactive.

== Early difficulties ==
The game was originally due for release in October 2004; however, the release date slipped to March 2005 due to difficulties in coding the game from scratch. This allowed new rival, Sports Interactive's Football Manager 2005, a clear run to establish itself ahead of the release of Championship Manager 5. A release on the Macintosh platform was cancelled prior to release, again giving headway to its rival Football Manager, which was made available for Mac as standard on a dual format CD-ROM (with the PC Windows version).

Upon its release, the game contained an unusually high number of bugs. Even though Beautiful Game Studios published a downloadable patch on the day of release, many users felt that Championship Manager 5 was unplayable. Key problems included difficulties transferring players (either in or out of a club) and a very unrealistic match engine. Perhaps one of the biggest issues discovered by people purchasing Championship Manager 5 was that the player database was not particularly reliable. The database had been made "for the fans by the fans" in previous games and was probably the biggest strength of the Championship Manager brand. Beautiful Game Studios had employed a professional firm to create much of the player database and they had apparently failed despite the best efforts of the in-house research team.

Other issues arose shortly after CM5 was released. Features like hotseat multiplayer games, which had been confirmed as being included in the game, disappointed some by their absence when the game arrived. Other small things such as player histories were also missing from the final product. Two patches are available that contain significant improvements to the game.

== Console versions ==
A scaled-down version of Championship Manager 5 was released on Xbox and PlayStation 2 in March 2005 along with a PlayStation Portable version, simply called Championship Manager. These are known to contain many of the same bugs and data errors as the PC version. All three console versions were developed by Gusto Games.

== See also ==
- Championship Manager (PSP)
- Football Manager 2005
