= CM4 =

CM4 may refer to:

- CM postcode area
- Championship Manager 4
- Raspberry Pi Compute Module 4
