= Championship Manager: Season 99/00 =

1999 video game

- Developer: Sports Interactive
- Publisher: Eidos Interactive
- Series: Championship Manager
- Platforms: Windows, Mac OS
- Release: 3 December 1999 (PC); 10 December 1999 (Mac)
- Genres: Sports, sports management
- Modes: Single-player, multiplayer

Championship Manager: Season 99/00 is a football management simulation video game in Sports Interactive's Championship Manager series. It was released for Microsoft Windows on 3 December 1999, and for Mac on 10 December 1999. The game allowed players to take charge of clubs from sixteen countries, with responsibility for training, tactics and signings.

== Release ==
The game was released for Windows on 3 December 1999. It sold over 27,000 copies in its first week. For the first time in the series, the game was released for Mac users on 10 December 1999.

== New features ==
"In the same way that you can only really support one team, you can only really play one management game, and you might as well have the best. The irony is that for all the money other companies spend on securing official licences, Championship Manager is universally perceived as the official management game. Buying a different one would only be cheating yourself. It's been said before, but after trying other management games, going back to Champ Manager is a return to calmness and sanity."

— From PC Zone's review of Championship Manager 99/00 in August 2001.

Even though the look and feel of the game was essentially the same as Championship Manager 3, there were many new features including a quicker match engine with enhanced commentary, the ability to fine and discipline players, improved board interaction, and the capability to improve your stadium and facilities. Additionally, the database was increased to feature over 40,000 players and staff, and Major League Soccer was included as a playable league for the first time.

== Reception ==
=== PC ===
Reception

Review scores
Publication	Score
Computer Games Magazine	4.5/5
Eurogamer	9/10
GameSpot	9.5/10
PC Gamer (UK)	89%
PC Zone	9.2

Championship Manager 99/00 received positive reviews across the board. GameSpot gave it an almost faultless 9.5 out of 10. Computer Games Magazine gave it 4.5 stars and described it as "the most realistic sports management game available, bar none". The Sports Gaming Network gave it a 98% rating and proclaimed it was "the finest sports game ever made".

=== Mac ===
MacGaming called Championship Manager 99/00 "a beast of a game", ultimately awarding it a 93% rating.

== Accolades ==
The game received a "Gold" sales award from the Entertainment and Leisure Software Publishers Association (ELSPA), indicating sales of at least 200,000 copies in the United Kingdom.
