= CM2 =

CM2, CM-2 or cm^{2} may refer to:

- Configuration Management, previously known as CMII
- The Chelmsford postcode area
- Captain Marvel Jr. a fictional superhero
- Championship Manager 2
- Cocaine Muzik 2, a mixtape by rapper Yo Gotti
- A primary school grade in the French educational system
- cm^{2} (square centimetre)
- CM2, a group of meteorites
- A type of contribution margin
- Connection Machine-2, a super computer
- Corby CM-2 Starlet, an amateur-built aircraft
- Chemex CM-2, a coffeemaker
