= Football Manager 2016 =

2015 association football management simulation video game

- Developer: Sports Interactive
- Publisher: Sega
- Series: Football Manager
- Platforms: Microsoft Windows, OS X, Linux
- Release: 13 November 2015
- Genre: Sports management
- Modes: Single player, multiplayer

Football Manager 2016 is a football management simulation video game and the thirteenth instalment in the Football Manager series developed by Sports Interactive and published by Sega. It was released on Microsoft Windows, OS X, and Linux on 13 November 2015.

== Gameplay ==
Football Manager 2016 features similar gameplay to that of the Football Manager series. Gameplay consists of taking charge of a professional football team (the game also includes semi-professional, amateur, and international teams) as the manager. Players can sign football players to contracts, manage finances for the club, and give team talks to players. The Football Manager series is a simulation of real world management, with the player being judged on various factors by the club's AI owners and board.

In Football Manager 2016, players can now customise the appearances of their manager on the pitch. Two new modes are also introduced, including the Fantasy Draft mode, in which multiple players can play together, and draft players with a fixed budget. The second mode is called Create-A-Club, originated from the Editor version of the game but was now included in the final game. Players can create their own club with kits, logos, stadiums, and transfer budget. All of them can be customised by players.

Football Manager 2016 features ProZone Match Analysis, which can provide analysis to matches. The feature was developed by Sports Interactive in conjunction with ProZone, a real-life analysis company. Improvements were introduced to the game's AI, animation, movements of the game's characters, board requests, competition rules, and financial module. The game's Match Tactics and Set Piece Creator was overhauled, and there were also new social media features.

== Development ==
The game was developed by Sports Interactive and was announced on 7 September 2015. It was released on 13 November 2015 for Microsoft Windows, Mac OS X, and Linux. There were also two other Football Manager games set to be released within 2015: Football Manager Touch, which features content from Football Manager 2015's Classic Mode, for both Microsoft Windows and high-end tablets, and was said to offer a more streamlined experience. The second game was Football Manager Mobile, which was released for iOS and Android. A game demo was released on 15 November 2015. Players' career progress would be carried to the full version if they decide to purchase the game.

== Reception ==
Reception

Aggregate score
| Aggregator | Score |
|---|---|
| Metacritic | PC: 81/100 |

Review scores
| Publication | Score |
|---|---|
| GameSpot | 7/10 |
| PC Gamer (US) | 83/100 |
| The Guardian | 4/5 |
| VideoGamer.com | 8/10 |
| TouchArcade | (Mobile) iOS: 4.5/5 (Touch) iOS: 5/5 |

Football Manager 2016 received positive reviews from critics upon release. Aggregate review website Metacritic assigned a score of 81 out of 100 based on 34 reviews. PC Gamer praised the game's vast depth and criticised its lack of accessibility, concluding: "Still untouchable on the footy front but shelf life and that inconsistent 3D engine chip away at its tender achilles." Tom Hatfield of GameSpot praised the game's Create a Club mode and improved user interface but wrote unfavorably about the game's inaccessibility and lack of speed. The Guardian wrote positively about the game's depth and praised the iterative steps the franchise was making towards accessibility, stating: "The moreish management sim is back featuring its usual tactical depth, but with a more user-friendly road to success – which is bad news for your loved ones."

== Sales ==
Sports Interactive studio director Miles Jacobson announced that Football Manager 2016 had sold 1 million copies by 15 September 2016.

== See also ==
- Business simulation game
