= Football Manager 2011 =

2010 association football management simulation video game

- Developer: Sports Interactive
- Publisher: Sega
- Series: Football Manager
- Platforms: Microsoft Windows, Mac OS X, PlayStation Portable, iOS
- Release: Microsoft Windows, Mac OS X: EU: 5 November 2010; NA: 9 November 2010; PlayStation Portable: PAL: 26 November 2010; NA: 7 December 2010; iOS: WW: 16 December 2010
- Genre: Sports management
- Modes: Single player, multiplayer

Football Manager 2011 is a football management simulation video game and the eighth instalment in the Football Manager series developed by Sports Interactive and published by Sega. It was released for Microsoft Windows and Mac OS X on 5 November 2010. It was also released for PlayStation Portable on 26 November 2010. A version for iOS was released on 16 December 2010.

== Gameplay ==
Football Manager 2011 features similar gameplay to previous entries in the Football Manager series. Gameplay consists of taking charge of a professional football team (the game also includes semi-professional, amateur, and international teams) as the manager. Players can sign football players to contracts, manage finances for the club, and give team talks to players. The Football Manager series is a simulation of real world management, with the player being judged on various factors by the club's AI owners and board.

On 11 August 2010, Sports Interactive published a video announcing a number of new features that would be included in Football Manager 2011. It features enhanced agent roles, with agents all acting differently according to their personalities. In-game press conferences received a revamp, with more in-depth questions being asked by the press. Football Manager 2011 also featured improvements to match analysis, with information regarding different plays being shown in-depth.

== Reception ==
Reception

Aggregate score
Aggregator	Score
Metacritic	PC: 85/100; PSP: 77/100 iOS: 76/100

Review scores
Publication	Score
Eurogamer	90%
GameSpot	8.5/10
The Daily Telegraph	8/10

Review aggregator website Metacritic gives the game a score of 85/100, with "generally favorable reviews" based on 23 critic reports. The German website 4players.de rated the game with 87% as "sehr gut".

=== Sales ===
In February 2011, Sega announced that Football Manager 2011 was the company's third-highest-grossing game of the financial year, with the Microsoft Windows and PlayStation Portable versions combined selling 690,000 units. Despite this, Sega called the game's sales "slow", alongside PlatinumGames like Vanquish and Sonic Colors.

== See also ==
- Business simulation game
- Championship Manager 2011
