= CM3 =

CM3 may refer to:

- Championship Manager 3
- Captain Marvel Jr.
- the Chelmsford postal area
- Center for Microfibrous Materials Manufacturing
- cm^{3} (Cubic centimetre)
- Clay Matthews III
- Carlton Mellick III
