= Championship Manager 96/97 =

1996 video game

- Developer(s): Sports Interactive, Eidos Interactive
- Publisher(s): Eidos Interactive
- Designer(s): Paul Collyer, Oliver Collyer
- Series: Championship Manager
- Platform(s): PC, Amiga
- Release: 27 September 1996
- Genre(s): Sports
- Mode(s): Single player, multiplayer

Championship Manager 96/97 is a game in the Championship Manager series of football management simulation video games. It was released in September 1996 for the PC and Amiga computers. This was the last Championship Manager game to be released for the Amiga, the platform that the series started on. It is the only game in the series to have been developed by both Sports Interactive and the game's long-time publishers Eidos Interactive.

== Gameplay ==
The game, a seasonal update (the first of many in the series), included more than just a modified player database. For the first time, the game included three playable league systems within the main game: England, Scotland, and Italy. As well as the usual complement of bug fixes and tweaks to the game's AI, there were also rule changes to reflect real-life changes in the world of football, such as the full implementation of the Bosman ruling and the inclusion of five substitutes in the Premier League. The game also had a cheat in which if the player's name entered at the beginning of the game was the name of a national manager of the time (for instance Glenn Hoddle for the England national football team) then the game would allow the player to take charge of that national team right from the start, as opposed to working up a good enough reputation to be offered the job as was supposed to be the case.

== Creation of new players ==
The game replaced a player when it decided they were of retirement age. It had a database of first- and second-names for each nationality and would randomly come up with a combination of these to rename a new player who replaced the old retiring player. This data-base could be accessed and amended by the user to allow for comical names to be introduced into the gameplay. Notable players who often retired at the end of the first or second season were George Weah and Ruud Gullit, and the replacements for these would always have similar playing abilities, leading to some outstanding made-up players to be created.

== Star players ==
Like all Championship Manager games, it would make some stars out of surprising players. Alan Fettis, who starts the game as the Nottingham Forest reserve goalkeeper, was an outstanding player, available for only a few hundred thousand pounds early on in the game. Viktor Leonenko of Dynamo Kiev would also prove an excellent player in the game, despite the real-life Leonenko being more of a reserve player due to the form of Serhiy Rebrov and Andriy Shevchenko.
