= Championship Manager (video game) =

- MS-DOS cover art
- Developer: Intelek
- Publisher: Domark
- Designers: Paul Collyer; Oliver Collyer
- Composer: Barry Leitch
- Series: Championship Manager
- Platforms: MS-DOS, Amiga, Atari ST
- Release: 15 May 1992
- Genre: Sports
- Modes: Single player, multiplayer

Championship Manager is the first game in the Championship Manager series as well as the Football Manager series of association football management simulation games. The game was released on the Amiga and Atari ST in September, 1992 and ported to MS-DOS soon after. The game was written by Paul and Oliver Collyer, the co-founders of Sports Interactive.

== Gameplay ==
The game featured four playable English divisions (First through to Fourth; the newly formed FA Premier League did not appear until CM 93/94). In the game, each division contained only 20 teams, whereas in real life they contained 22 or 24 teams at that time. Also included were all of the major domestic cups of the time (including the Anglo-Italian Cup) and the 3 major European trophies (including the now defunct Cup Winners' Cup).

Any teams outside of the four playable divisions and all foreign teams had no player names at all. Instead, players were simply called "No.3" or "No.10" depending on which position they played.

One of the most innovative things about the game was the introduction of "average ratings" for players - after each match the performance of every player was graded from 0-10 and as the season went on the player's average rating would allow the manager to easily see how each player was performing.

== Other versions ==
In 1993, Intelek and Ubisoft used the Collyers' game code to produce a version for the French market, known as Guy Roux Manager (named after the legendary AJ Auxerre manager). It was fully localised for France and included the French first and second divisions as playable leagues, and all text and commentary in French. The Guy Roux Manager franchise got a few sequels, usually localised with different managers for different regions. The last of these was Guy Roux Manager 2002 for PlayStation 2 and Gameboy Advance.

Also in 1993, the first Norwegian version was released; a year later, an Italian version. While the Norwegian version was very much similar to the English one, in the Italian version it was possible to substitute up to 4 players in any game and the transfer deadline occurred much earlier in the season. Both the Norwegian and Italian versions featured real named players though, adding to the popularity of the game.

== Development ==
Paul, the older of the Collyer brothers, created a precursor to the game on a BBC Micro computer from their childhood home in rural Shropshire in 1983. "We didn't even have Teletext back then as we had such a terrible TV signal..."I would listen to the radio to get the results, then type them in to the computer and it would update the league tables on the screen. That was my first venture into football programming".

Electronic Arts reportedly turned down the chance to publish Championship Manager in 1992, as it did not feature enough "live action", with match commentary provided via a text interface.

== Reception ==
The release of this first version of the game was not an outstanding success with sales at a reported 20,000.

== See also ==
- Football Manager (1982 series)
