= Football Manager 2010 =

2009 association football management simulation video game

- Developer: Sports Interactive
- Publisher: Sega
- Series: Football Manager
- Platforms: Microsoft Windows, Mac OS X, PlayStation Portable, iOS
- Release: EU: 30 October 2009; NA: 3 November 2009
- Genre: Sports management
- Modes: Single player, multiplayer

Football Manager 2010 is a football management simulation video game and the seventh instalment in the Football Manager series developed by Sports Interactive and published by Sega. It was released on Microsoft Windows, Mac OS X, and PlayStation Portable on 30 October 2009. It is also available for digital download on Steam and iOS. This is the first release in the series to be sold under the Football Manager name throughout the world; previous North American versions were sold as Worldwide Soccer Manager. A demo game was released on 14 October 2009.

== Gameplay ==
Football Manager 2010 features similar gameplay to that of the Football Manager series. Gameplay consists of taking charge of a professional football team (the game also includes semi-professional, amateur, and international teams) as the manager. Players can sign football players to contracts, manage finances for the club, and give team talks to players. The Football Manager series is a simulation of real world management, with the player being judged on various factors by the club's AI owners and board.

Football Manager 2010 expanded on the 3D match engine first introduced in Football Manager 2009, with more animations, stadiums, and even pitch degradation. The database editor has also received an upgrade, the stand-out feature of which is the option to add new divisions to existing leagues or to add entirely new leagues to a game database. For example, users can make the English football league system fully playable right down to its lowest tier (up to level 20), making it the first football management game capable of doing so, or they could make a league for a nation whose league is not normally playable, or even make their own entirely new league, such as a Super League.

The first patch, 10.1, was released on 30 October 2009. Version 10.1.1 was released on 2 December 2009. The next major patch, 10.2, was released on 17 December 2009. The last patch, 10.3, includes mid-season transfer update and was released on 1 March 2010.

== Reception ==
Reception

Aggregate score
| Aggregator | Score |
|---|---|
| Metacritic | PC: 87/100; PSP: 69/100 iOS: 83/100 |

Review scores
| Publication | Score |
|---|---|
| Eurogamer | 90% |
| IGN | 9.3/10 |
| The Daily Telegraph | 9/10 |
| TouchArcade | iOS: 4/5 |

Football Manager 2010 was positively received, achieving a Metacritic average of 87/100. IGN concluded that "FM2010 isn't an evolutionary step in the series. Instead it's merely an incredibly well produced update." In its Christmas 2009 edition, Edge commented: "Despite being all about the numbers, FM2010 rises above them to be unexpectedly cruel, kind, and even visceral at times."

== See also ==
- Business simulation game
- Championship Manager 2010
