= Football Manager Live =

2008 massively multiplayer online sports management video game

- Developer: Sports Interactive
- Publisher: Sega
- Series: Football Manager
- Platforms: Microsoft Windows, Mac OS X
- Release: Windows: (download); 4 November 2008; Windows: (DVD): PAL: 23 January 2009
- Genre: Sports management
- Mode: Massively multiplayer online game

Football Manager Live is a massively multiplayer online game (MMO) and the fifth instalment in the Football Manager series developed by Sports Interactive and published by Sega. It was released in November 2008 for Microsoft Windows and Mac OS X. Whilst the game was subscription-based, both major and minor updates were provided within the subscription, paid for by users. Subscriptions could be purchased online using debit/credit cards or PayPal to play regularly, or through boxed copies released in the United Kingdom on 23 January 2009. The servers for the game shut down in May 2011.

== Gameplay ==
Football Manager Live differed significantly from previous Football Manager titles, whilst keeping the same match engine and many of their fundamental concepts. Users were assigned to a "Game World" of up to 1,000 players, created their clubs and filled their squads with real players, similar to fantasy football. Players were signed via a proxy bidding system similar to eBay, with the player signing with the highest-bidding club.

While Football Manager Live utilised a very similar database to Football Manager 2009, like its offline counterpart, aging players retired, and younger players were randomly generated in their place within each game world, creating an increasingly fictional environment as seasons progress. Clubs could choose a football association based on the number of matches the user wants to play ("Casual" FAs for casual players and "Xtreme" ones for more dedicated players) and which play times were most convenient. Each FA had its ladder system with a Premier League and several lower leagues linked via promotion and relegation. Matchmaking for league fixtures was done through a "resolve by" system in which users have to finish a game by a certain deadline instead of having to meet online at a specific time. If a player could not meet the deadline, an AI "assistant manager" took over their team for that match.

To manage the inflationary economics of the game, players were required to construct a stadium to accommodate several different fan bases for the club. These included die-hards, devoted families, glory hunters, and corporates, each offering characteristics, such as wealth and atmosphere. This took money out of club finances and was generally received negatively by players. The stadia and fan base profile had little impact on gameplay and had no impact on the appearance of the stadia during gameplay. The game also added a role-playing game-like skill training system for users. Managers could improve their coaching, physiotherapy, finance, scouting, and infrastructure skills to become more specialised or to suit their play style.

== Gameworlds ==
There were 12 Gameworlds in Football Manager Live. The gameworld system was radically changed in 2010 when it was split into two types: Fantasy Players and Returning Stars. Previously, as a gameworld progressed over time, real-life players gradually aged and retired to be replaced by generated players or regens. This remains the case with Fantasy Players' gameworlds, but for Returning Stars, the gameworld is reset sporadically back to the present day.

The first gameworld, launched on 4 November 2008, was Cantona, followed by 8 other worlds until the first Pro-Gameworld, Toms, was launched on 12 January 2009. Existing users were encouraged to join the first Pro-Gameworld by having the opportunity to transfer the skills that they had gained to the new Gameworld. This was impossible when transferring worlds previously, and the challenge of playing the best was readily taken up. Gameworlds were named after real-life ex-players. In June 2010, the 3D match engine, first seen in Football Manager 2009, was added to Football Manager Live.

== Game restructuring ==
On 26 November 2009, Sports Interactive announced vast changes to the existing game. The most controversial of these changes was the announcement of the resetting of all current game worlds to their initial states, which would commence on 1 March 2010. This announcement caused controversy amongst the community as many managers were upset by the results from this decision, which would include losing all progress made up until this date. In an attempt to make up for this action, Sports Interactive offered all current subscribers two months of free play time, which met with relatively negative reactions.

On 18 December 2009, Sports Interactive announced that it would be extending the free time for its managers until the reset in March 2010. Following the outcry over lost skills, it was also announced that they would implement a new skills system into Football Manager Live after the reset, allowing current managers to use their existing skill points after the reset. This move was met with great appreciation by the game's current subscribers. At the same time, it was announced that the new version 1.4 would include youth academies and many more extras, which its subscribers had been asking for many months.

== See also ==
- Business simulation game
- Games as a service
- Subscription business model
