= Championship Manager: Season 03/04 =

2003 video game

Championship Manager 03/04
- Developer(s): Sports Interactive
- Publisher(s): Eidos Interactive
- Series: Championship Manager
- Platform(s): Microsoft Windows, Macintosh
- Release: Windows: EU: 21 November 2003; AU: 5 December 2003; Mac OS X: EU: 12 December 2003
- Genre(s): Sports
- Mode(s): Single player, multiplayer

Championship Manager 03/04 is a football management simulation video game in the Championship Manager series, developed by Sports Interactive and published by Eidos Interactive, released for PC Windows in November 2003 and the following month on Mac computers.

== Gameplay ==
The game showcases a whole host of new features and improvements including four new leagues, a pre-game database editor, the ability to view previously saved matches and updated player, team, and competition data for the season. The game retains the 2D top-down graphical view of the match, first introduced in the previous title in the series, Championship Manager 4. The game features a database of more than 200,000 footballers from around the world, statistics rated by an army of more than 2,500 researchers, and 43 countries' leagues playable across 92 divisions.

== Development ==
This was the last game in the series published prior to the split between developers Sports Interactive and Eidos Interactive, the publishers of the series since Championship Manager 2, with Sports Interactive going on to launch the rival Football Manager series.

== Reception ==
Championship Manager: Season 03/04 received a "Platinum" sales award from the Entertainment and Leisure Software Publishers Association (ELSPA), indicating sales of at least 300,000 copies in the United Kingdom.
