= Championship Manager 2011 =

2010 video game

Championship Manager
- Splash screen from the game
- Developer(s): Beautiful Game Studios
- Publisher(s): Eidos Interactive
- Series: Championship Manager
- Platform(s): iOS
- Release: EU: October 14, 2010
- Genre(s): Sports management
- Mode(s): Single-player

Championship Manager 2011 is a 2010 sports management game developed by Beautiful Game Studios and published by Eidos Interactive. It was released for iOS on 14 October 2010. Football Manager 2011 was its main competitor.
