= Championship Manager: Season 01/02 =

2001 video game

- Developer: Sports Interactive
- Publisher: Eidos Interactive
- Producers: Gary Moore (exec.); Steven Didd; Andrew Norman
- Designers: Oliver Collyer; Paul Collyer; Marc Vaughan; Miles Dinnen; Svein Kvernoey; Keith Flannery; Paul Norman
- Platform: Windows: Mac OS; Xbox
- Release: 12 October 2001: Mac; WW: 16 November 2001; Xbox; PAL: 14 April 2002
- Genres: Sport; Management
- Modes: Single player; multiplayer

Championship Manager: Season 01/02 is a football management simulation video game in Sports Interactive's Championship Manager series. It was released for Microsoft Windows in October 2001, and for Mac in November 2001. It was later released on Xbox in April 2002. It was released as freeware in 2008. The game allowed players to take charge of any club in one of around 100 leagues across 27 countries, with responsibility for tactics and signings. The game sold more than 300,000 copies in the United Kingdom and is still popular and regularly updated.

== Background ==
Although never particularly expanding on the graphical side, Sports Interactive included many new features along with the usual updated database. It implemented the new European Union regulated transfer system, introduced in September 2001, and also featured a new "attribute masking" mode, whereby the player could only see information about footballers they would realistically know about (also known as a fog of war). Other new additions included the ability to send players away for surgery, player notes, player comparisons and improved media and board interaction.

== Free release and data updates ==
In December 2008, Eidos Interactive made the game available for free download.

== Release ==
In 2001, presenters Ant & Dec, who hosted the Saturday morning show SMTV Live, left the show. On their last show, they received a letter from Sports Interactive and special edition copies of Championship Manager: Season 01/02, which saw Ant as a player for Newcastle United with a contract of £50,000 a week with a value of £4.7 million, and Dec as a player for Sunderland with a contract of £90 a week.

== Notable players ==
The first release of the game included a player named Tó Madeira, a great striker no matter where he played. In 2016, it was reported that the player was entirely fictional, and this claim was cited in the article at that time. However, following an investigation by Portuguese comedian Luís Franco-Bastos, it was later claimed that the player had in fact existed. According to the investigation, he was a promising footballer who played for C.D. Gouveia and attracted interest from clubs such as Marítimo and Farense. He reportedly played until the early 2000s but retired from professional football due to personal reasons and a failed doping test. As of the most recent information, he owns a restaurant and works as a waiter in Portugal.

== Reception ==
The computer version of Championship Manager: Season 01/02 received a "Platinum" sales award from the Entertainment and Leisure Software Publishers Association (ELSPA), indicating sales of at least 300,000 copies in the United Kingdom.
