= Championship Manager Quiz =

2001 video game

- Championship Manager Quiz PAL front cover (PS1)
- Developer: King of the Jungle
- Publisher: Eidos Interactive
- Platforms: PlayStation, Microsoft Windows
- Release: PlayStation: EU: 30 November 2001; Microsoft Windows: EU: 7 December 2001
- Genre: Sports
- Modes: Single player, multiplayer

Championship Manager Quiz (informally named CM Quiz) is a football trivia quiz video game released for the PlayStation and Microsoft Windows in 2001, developed by King of the Jungle and published by Eidos Interactive. It is a spin-off from the Championship Manager series of games.

== Gameplay ==
The game consists of a multiple-choice quiz, with over 11,000 questions with the focus largely on the domestic English and Scottish leagues. Players select a team to represent and correct answers enable them to pass the ball between players and eventually in a position to shoot and score. Players are offered three Who Wants To Be A Millionaire?-style lifelines: "One-Two" (removing two wrong answers), "Hit & Hope" (which gives the player two chances to answer the question) and "Substitution" (which avoids the question entirely, granting the player a new one to answer). Modes include "Exhibition" (in which players quiz against the computer), "Keep Uppy" (in which players try to answer as many questions correctly as possible), "Pub Quiz" and multiplayer. The PC version included an editor, allowing players to add their questions to the game's database.

== Reception ==
Dave Woods of PC Zone found the game to be "unbelievably hard" and criticised it for the "cardinal sin of repeating questions", but gave it a score of 78%. The title received a score of 6/10 in Official PlayStation Magazine, who described it as a "hardcore footie quiz with too few questions".

== See also ==
- Championship Manager series
- Football Manager
