= Championship Manager 2007 =

2006 video game

- Developer: Beautiful Game Studios
- Publishers: Eidos Interactive; Virtual Programming (Mac)
- Platforms: PC, Xbox 360, PlayStation 2, PlayStation Portable, Mac OS X
- Release: Windows: EU: 2006-10-13; AU: 2006-10-27; PS2, PSP, Xbox 360: EU: 2007-03-16; AU: 2007-04-13; Macintosh; 2007-05-16
- Genre: Sports management
- Mode: Single player

Championship Manager 2007 is a football management simulation video game developed by Beautiful Game Studios and published by Eidos Interactive. It was released for Microsoft Windows on 13 October 2006, and for PlayStation 2, PlayStation Portable, and Xbox 360 on 16 March 2007. It was brought to Mac OS X on 16 May 2007 by Virtual Programming.

== Features ==
In addition to the usual seasonal data updates reflecting player movements and competition outcomes, this version of the game sees several new features introduced. For the PlayStation Portable, PlayStation 2, and Xbox 360, the game introduces two new divisions for the English leagues, the Conference North and Conference South, with up-to-date player statistics for these clubs.

For the PlayStation Portable, numerous features have been introduced such as staff feedback on team selection, and team talks. A new Match Analysis tool has been added to the game which includes many stats for each team and player at the end of a match. A demo has been released on the PC and is available on the Championship Manager website. The layout and controls of the game, especially on the PlayStation Portable, have been made much more complicated since Championship Manager 2006.

== Reception ==
GameSpot praised the ProZone analysis but observed that the match engine still needs work.

== See also ==
- Football Manager 2007
