= Championship Manager 3 =

1999 video game

- Developer: Sports Interactive
- Publisher: Eidos
- Designers: Paul Collyer, Oliver Collyer, Marc Vaughan
- Platform: Microsoft Windows
- Release: EU: 26 March 1999
- Genre: Sports
- Modes: Single-player, multiplayer

Championship Manager 3 is a game in the Championship Manager series of football management simulation video games, the first in the third generation of the series. It was developed by Sports Interactive and released exclusively for the PC in the spring of 1999.

== Gameplay ==
Championship Manager 3 features new user interface and menu system. It primarily used a vertical menu bar on the left-hand side of the screen, as well as the traditional horizontal menu bars across the top and bottom of the screen. In addition to the new menu system, many more high-resolution background images were added; these were mostly relevant to whatever screen the player was viewing.

There were many small changes and improvements to the gameplay, including an improved match-engine, customisable training schedules, more cup competitions from around the world, a more in-depth tactics system, realistic reserve and youth squads, and improved player scouting. One major new addition was the ability to play multiplayer games via a local area network (LAN), allowing up to 16 people to compete against each other in the same game world. This option could also be used to play over the internet. The hotseat multiplayer mode was also expanded to allow up to 16 people to play on the same machine.

The database of players and staff swelled to over 25,000 for this version, again increasing the depth and realism of the game. Due to the increased player database and the massive amount of processing that the game needed to do, a multi-tasking design was used. This allowed the computer to process data in the background while still allowing the player to do things like browse around the game, search for players, and change tactics, among other things. The number of playable leagues also increased in this instalment to include league systems of fifteen nations were selectable. For the first time, playable leagues outside of Europe were included.

== Reception ==
Reception

Review scores
Publication	Score
GameSpot	8.5
PC Zone	93%

Championship Manager 3 received generally favourable reviews, and was consistently rated above 85%. PC Zone gave the game its highest rating (93%), praising the depth of its database and its ease of use, although it was marked down for its slow running speed on older hardware. The game was a hit in the United Kingdom having sold 170,000 copies.
