= Wave Rally =

2001 video game

- Developer: Opus Studio
- Publisher: Eidos Interactive
- Platform: PlayStation 2
- Release: NA: November 27, 2001; EU: December 14, 2001
- Genre: Racing
- Modes: Single-player, multiplayer

Wave Rally, also known as Jet Ski Riders, is a 2001 Jet Ski racing game developed by Opus Studio and published by Eidos Interactive exclusively for the PlayStation 2. It was also to be released on the Xbox but was canceled.

== Gameplay ==
The game provides players with both a Jet Ski and runabout on which to race. Five modes of play are offered: Arcade, Championship, Time Trial, Multiplayer, and Freestyle. The Championship mode awards points based on the player's final position in each race. The objective is to be the rider with the most points at the end of the season. The Arcade mode forces the player to reach checkpoints within a given time limit in order to continue with the race. The freestyle arena requires the player to perform various tricks with the aid of waves and ramps scattered around the open area. Tricks are performed using button and directional pad combinations and are judged according to composition, appeal and technical merit, among others.

Dynamic waves which vary in frequency and height can help or hinder the progress during the race. Races take place during different times of the day and in variable weather conditions. A cast of eight selectable characters, consisting of female and male riders, makes up the field for each race. Races take place in a variety of real world locations, such as the Maldives, New Zealand, Florida, and Venice. The official Kawasaki and Jet Pilot licenses allow for official watercraft and wetsuits. A two-player split-screen mode is also included.

== Soundtrack ==
The Western release of the game had a soundtrack provided by Moving Shadow record label, featuring music from Omni Trio, E-Z Rollers, Technical Itch, 2 Bad Mice, Dom & Roland, Aquasky, Perfect Combination, 60 Minute Man & Tekniq, with additional remixes provided from breakbeat maestros Hybrid and Rennie Pilgrem.

== Reception ==
Reception

Aggregate score
Aggregator	Score
Metacritic	62 out of 100

Review scores
Publication	Score
Famitsu	28 out of 40
Game Informer	4 out of 10
GamePro	4 out of 5
GameRevolution	D+
GameSpot	6.3 out of 10
GameSpy	74%
GameZone	5.9 out of 10
IGN	7.1 out of 10
Official U.S. PlayStation Magazine	1.5 out of 5
PlayStation: The Official Magazine	5 out of 10

Wave Rally received "mixed" reviews according to the review aggregation website Metacritic. In Japan, where the game was ported for release on January 31, 2002, Famitsu gave it a score of 28 out of 40.

Game Revolution commented, "It's got some nice waves, but a bad camera, tough controls, and some unsatisfying gameplay cause an evil tsunami of massive proportions." Official U.S. PlayStation Magazine stated, "This game looks so great, but the controls may very well be the worst I have ever seen in a racing game." IGN stated, "Wave Rally isn't bad to look or listen to, but in the end it seems like more trouble to play in view of the rewards it offers. Shoving yourself around the courses is a frequently frustrating task, even with a touch of catch-up to the AI. You can learn a better way around the tracks, sussing out the lines and finding shortcuts (of which there are many), but it's still entirely possible for the strange behavior of the water to throw you off, no matter how hard you try."
