= Football Manager 26 =

2025 video game

- Cover art
- Developer: Sports Interactive
- Publisher: Sega
- Series: Football Manager
- Engine: Unity
- Platforms: Windows; macOS; PlayStation 5; Xbox Series X/S; Mobile (via Netflix and Apple Arcade); Nintendo Switch
- Release: Windows, macOS, PS5, Xbox Series X/S; 4 November 2025; Nintendo Switch; 4 December 2025
- Genre: Sports management
- Modes: Single-player, multiplayer

Football Manager 26 (FM26) is a football management simulation video game developed by Sports Interactive and published by Sega. It was released on 4 November 2025 for Windows, macOS, Xbox Series X/S and PlayStation 5. The mobile version is available on both Android and iOS through Netflix, while the Touch edition is available via Apple Arcade. A Nintendo Switch edition followed suit on 4 December 2025. FM26 is the first game in the series to use the Unity engine and the first to adopt a two-digit naming format.

Despite an elongated development period during the transition to the Unity engine and the cancellation of Football Manager 2025, Football Manager 26 holds the series' lowest Metacritic rating and met with a mostly mixed or negative response after launch.

== Gameplay ==
As with previous entries in the series, Football Manager 26 places the player in control of a football club, overseeing tactics, transfers, training and financial management. The game utilises the Unity platform for its graphical and rendering systems, replacing the in-house technologies previously developed by Sports Interactive. This change introduced improvements to matchday presentation, including enhanced animations, ball physics and stadium lighting.

The user interface has been rebuilt from the ground up as part of the move to Unity, introducing a new visual identity and features such as bookmarks to improve accessibility and navigation. Core simulation elements, including the match engine, tactical systems and player decision-making, continue to rely on SI’s proprietary systems rather than Unity itself. Despite the shift to Unity, the game retains modest system requirements, remaining compatible with older hardware while supporting higher performance on modern GPUs.

== Development ==
Sports Interactive originally planned to release Football Manager 25 as the first title on Unity. However, in February 2025, the studio cancelled FM25, admitting the project did not meet internal quality standards. The decision allowed developers more time to polish features and optimise performance.

Football Manager 26 is the first game in the series to fully integrate women's football, with more than 35,000 licensed players and 14 playable leagues included at launch. Fully licensed women's leagues include the English Women's Super League and Women's Super League 2, the American National Women's Soccer League, the German Frauen-Bundesliga, the Swedish Damallsvenskan and the Australian A-League Women. Additionally, the UEFA Women's Champions League is also fully licensed. For the first time in the series, the game features full Premier League licensing and continues its long-standing partnership with the English Football League (EFL). The agreement with the EFL dates back to 2004, with Football Manager becoming an official licensee in 2014. In October 2025, the Scottish Professional Football League announced an extension to its partnership with Football Manager, making all 42 SPFL clubs fully licensed in-game with logos, kits and player faces. Football Manager 26 also includes the series debut of playable leagues in Egypt, Lithuania and the United Arab Emirates, with full licences for both Lithuania's A Lyga and the United Arab Emirates' ADNOC Pro League.

International management, which had been planned to return in Football Manager 26 after being removed from the cancelled Football Manager 25, was not available at launch. Sports Interactive first confirmed the delay in September 2025, following an earlier statement in September 2024 that the mode would "return in a much more feature-rich way".

On 30 September 2025, studio director Miles Jacobson reiterated in an interview that international management would not be included at release, citing a need to prioritise other areas of the game and feedback that the previous implementation lacked enjoyment.

Despite the delay, Sports Interactive announced on 17 October 2025 a multi-year partnership with FIFA, securing official licences for the FIFA World Cup, FIFA Women’s World Cup and FIFA Club World Cup. The studio confirmed that international management will return in a revamped form as a free update ahead of the 2026 FIFA World Cup, including official tournament branding, kits and broadcast graphics. This game update launched in May 2026, bringing men's international management back to the series, and included women's international management for the first time. The update also includes a new quick-start option allowing players to go straight into the 2026 World Cup tournament playing as any of the qualified teams, other than Japan, and the ability to manage the German national team for the first time in series' history. The debut inclusion of the German national team came as part of an expansion to the existing licensing agreement between Sports Interactive and the German Football Association. A second update was released in June 2026 which added Japan as a playable international nation, and included licensed kits and confirmed 2026 World Cup squads for all 48 qualified teams.

== Reception ==
Early previews praised Sports Interactive's decision to delay Football Manager 25 and relaunch with Football Manager 26 as a "course correction" for the series. Critics highlighted the move to Unity and the introduction of women's football as landmark developments for the series. Community response was mixed, with some players expressing concern about removed features, while others viewed the changes as necessary for long-term progress.

Football Manager 26 received "mixed or average" reviews from critics, according to review aggregator Metacritic. Ben Sledge of The Guardian wrote, "The 3D-rendered match highlights have been given an upgrade via the new Unity engine, and the results are impressive," but added, "After a fallow year to manage the transition to the new engine, Football Manager 26 remains remarkably unpolished." Phil Iwaniuk of PC Gamer said, "Simply put, matches look more like real football." Connor Bennett at Dexerto commented, "FM26’s new layout, however, is confusing and overwhelming." Alex Raisbeck, writing for Radio Times, wrote, "Following a chaotic two years in which FM25 had to be scrapped, FM26 is finally here. The graphics may have been updated, those foundations laid, but has all that trouble and strife resulted in a better game? For me, sadly not."

The game received mostly negative user reviews on Steam upon release, with players criticising the new interface and reporting performance problems.

In July 2026, Sports Interactive announced there would be no further updates for FM26, and they were now focused on the next release in the series. The studio also revealed FM26 had become the second-most played game in series history, with just under 10 million players. FM24 remains in first place, with over 20 million players as of October 2026.
