= Championship Manager 4 =

2003 video game

- Developer(s): Sports Interactive
- Publisher(s): Eidos Interactive
- Platform(s): Windows, Mac OS X
- Release: Windows: EU: 28 March 2003; AU: 11 April 2003; Mac OS X: EU: 17 May 2003
- Genre(s): Sports
- Mode(s): Single player, multiplayer

Championship Manager 4 is a football management simulation video game in the Championship Manager series.

== Publication history ==
It was the penultimate game in the series to be developed by Sports Interactive before they and publishers Eidos Interactive decided to go their separate ways. The game was released for PC Windows in March 2003 and then on the Mac on 17 May 2003.

== Reception ==
It was strongly anticipated by fans of the series, mainly due to the inclusion of a graphical 2D match-engine for the first time in a Championship Manager game. Upon its release, it became the fastest selling PC game of all time in the UK, outselling the nearest best selling PC title, Command & Conquer: Generals, by around two to one. Championship Manager 4 received a "Platinum" sales award from the Entertainment and Leisure Software Publishers Association (ELSPA), indicating sales of at least 300,000 copies in the United Kingdom.

Computer Gaming World nominated Championship Manager 4 for their 2003 "Sports Game of the Year" award, which ultimately went to Madden NFL 2004. During the 7th Annual Interactive Achievement Awards, the Academy of Interactive Arts & Sciences nominated Championship Manager 4 for "Computer Sports Game of the Year", which was ultimately awarded to Madden NFL 2004.

== See also ==
- Football Manager
- Football Manager 2005
