= Football Manager 2017 =

2016 association football management simulation video game

- Developer: Sports Interactive
- Publisher: Sega
- Series: Football Manager
- Platforms: Microsoft Windows, macOS, Linux
- Release: WW: 4 November 2016
- Genre: Sports management
- Modes: Single player, multiplayer

Football Manager 2017 is a football management simulation video game and the fourteenth instalment in the Football Manager series developed by Sports Interactive and published by Sega. It was released on Microsoft Windows, macOS, and Linux on 4 November 2016.

== Gameplay ==
Football Manager 2017 features similar gameplay to that of the Football Manager series. Gameplay consists of taking charge of a professional football team (the game also includes semi-professional, amateur, and international teams) as the team manager. Players can sign football players to contracts, manage finances for the club, and give team talks to players. The Football Manager series is a simulation of real world management, with the player being judged on various factors by the club's AI owners and board.

== Development ==
After the United Kingdom voted to leave the European Union (EU) on 23 June 2016, Football Manager 2017 featured a form of Brexit, with three possible scenarios: "business as usual" with no additional work visas needed; current players would be grandfathered but new players would need work visas; or a "hard Brexit" in-game scenario, which has Scotland voting for independence in a second referendum and remaining in the EU, whilst EU players would require working visas to play in any English, Welsh, or Northern Irish teams. Football Manager 2017 also featured a new social media view, which would show a Twitter-themed view of fans and players thoughts that would change after events that transpired in game. A new face scanning option allowed the player's in-game avatar to be customised to show a 3D view of the player's real life face by use of a webcam, or brought from a picture.

== Reception ==
Reception

Aggregate score
Aggregator	Score
Metacritic	PC: 80/100

Review scores
Publication	Score
Eurogamer	Recommended
GameSpot	7/10
PC Gamer (US)	85/100
Trusted Reviews	4.5/5
The Guardian	3/5
TouchArcade	(Touch) iOS: 4/5

On the review aggregator Metacritic, Football Manager 2017 received a score of 80 out of 100, based on 47 critics, indicating "generally favorable reviews". GameSpot gave the game a 7/10, applauding the player development and smart transfers, and also saying "Football Manager 2017 is easy to recommend to the budding manager" but not enjoying the tactics interface. PC Gamer gave the game a score of 85/100, saying the game is a significant step up from previous versions. Trusted Reviews gave the game 4.5 stars saying that "FM17 is a very definite leap forward."

George Osborn of The Guardian was less positive about the game, particularly citing previous releases in the series and the lack of a substantial increase over previous instalments. Osborn wrote: "Over the past four years, Football Manager editions have shaken up the way players create tactics, introduce in game manager stats or provide new game modes to play. FM 2017 offers none of that." Osborn was also highly critical of the game's purely cosmetic addition of a face scanner and inclusion of social media, calling it "utterly inconsequential". User reviews of the game on the Steam service show a "Mostly Negative" view, the result of a backlash from Chinese users protesting at the lack of an official translation in their language.

== Sales ==
On 21 August 2017, PC Games Insider published that Football Manager 2017 had sold its one-millionth copy. This was the fifth time in succession that the Football Manager game had sold one million copies or more. Miles Jackobson of Sports Interactive also stated that Football Manager 2017 had sold one million copies, and the series had "5(th) game(s) in a row".

== See also ==
- Business simulation game
