= Championship Manager 2 =

1997 video game

- Developer(s): Sports Interactive (PC); Sterling Games (Amiga)
- Publisher(s): Domark (PC); Eidos Interactive (Amiga)
- Designer(s): Paul Collyer; Oliver Collyer
- Series: Championship Manager
- Platform(s): PC, Amiga
- Release: 22 September 1995 (PC); 1997 (Amiga)
- Genre(s): Sports
- Mode(s): Single-player, multiplayer

Championship Manager 2 is a football management simulation video game in the Sports Interactive's Championship Manager series. It was released in September 1995 for PC. An Amiga version was released in 1997.

== New features ==
Championship Manager 2 introduced a far better quality of graphics compared to previous versions. The game included SVGA graphics and photorealistic background pictures, but the most notable new feature was the audio commentary engine. In addition to the traditional text-based match commentary, there was optional voice commentary on CD-ROM, provided by famous British football commentator Clive Tyldesley. The game greatly expanded the number of statistics and tactical possibilities, and made transfers and contract negotiations more realistic, with the Bosman ruling included in future updates. Another milestone was the inclusion of playable Scottish leagues, albeit only in the PC version. For the first time in the series, there was a selection of leagues to choose from at the start of the game. However, it could only be one run at a time.

== Gameplay ==
In terms of the underlying gameplay, not a great deal had been changed since the original Championship Manager. The look and feel had been improved, but was still very much a text-based and menu-driven game, and the user interface was almost identical to previous games, albeit at a much higher resolution.

== Versions ==
Two new versions of Championship Manager 2 were later released allowing users to play leagues from across Europe. One version contained the Spanish, Belgian, and Dutch leagues, and the other contained French, German, and Italian leagues. Only one league could be run at a time, but was still a big milestone for the series and signalled the intent of Sports Interactive to expand the Championship Manager universe across the globe. The Amiga port was developed by Sterling Games. The Amiga version did not include all the features of the PC version, such as the Scottish League, international management, and player histories and backgrounds. Furthermore, it could not be installed to a hard drive.

== Reception ==
The new game brought critical reviews including 49% from PC Gamer urging the series to "stop plastering its face with make-up" and "allow itself to be led quietly off to the old people's home, where it will be remembered kindly".
