= Sports Interactive =

British video game developer

Sports Interactive Limited
- Logo since May 2024
- Type: Subsidiary
- Industry: Video games
- Founded: 1994; 32 years ago
- Founders: Oliver and Paul Collyer
- Headquarters: London, England
- Key people: Miles Jacobson; (studio director); Matt Carroll; (COO)
- Products: Football Manager series; Championship Manager series; NHL Eastside Hockey Manager series
- Number of employees: 285 (2024)
- Parent: Sega (2006–present)
- Website: sports-interactive.com

Sports Interactive Limited is a British video game developer based in London, best known for the Football Manager series. Founded by brothers Oliver and Paul Collyer in July 1994, the studio was acquired in 2006 by Sega, a Japanese video game publisher, and became part of Sega Europe. In addition to its work on Football Manager, the studio has also created a number of other sports-management simulations, including NHL Eastside Hockey Manager and Championship Manager Quiz, and is the former developer of Championship Manager.

== History ==
Founded by Paul Collyer and Oliver Collyer, the company is commonly abbreviated to SI amongst fans of their games. In 2003, Sports Interactive split with former publisher Eidos Interactive and signed a deal with Sega to continue their flagship sports franchise under the new name Football Manager. The name was acquired from Addictive Games' game series that began in 1982. After the split, both parties kept their intellectual property. Sports Interactive kept the base code, the game database and programming of the game, whilst Eidos kept the rights to the Championship Manager franchise.

On 28 June 2012, Miles Jacobson and Ian Livingstone revealed why they split from Eidos Interactive and joined Sega. In a chat with GameHorizon, Jacobson thought that Beautiful Game Studios was brought in to take over Championship Manager, whilst Livingstone thought that Eidos Interactive brought Beautiful Game Studios to protect the firm in case Sports Interactive jumped ship. Jacobson commented, saying, "I'm sure there are two sides to this story, at the time we felt there was a lack of respect that we did for our work from Eidos. There seemed to be an attitude at the time in the industry that anyone could make games." He continued by saying, "Eidos wanted more control. We wanted more control. We were asking for high royalties. Eidos set up Beautiful Game Studios nine months before Championship Manager 4 was due to come out. They told me that BGS were making a platform game. I thought our number was up." He then further elaborated by saying, "I went for a curry with the CEO of Sega in Japan and Europe, and he made me an offer on a napkin, I kept telling them we were not for sale. I told them they would have to double the offer for me to even discuss it with Paul and Oliver Collyer." On 4 April 2006, it was announced that Sega Holdings Europe Ltd, holding company for Sports Interactive's publisher's Sega, had acquired Sports Interactive. When Sega acquired the company, it had 34 employees.

In 2018, Sports Interactive relocated from Old Street in Islington to the Here East development in Stratford. Now occupying half of the first floor in the Press Centre, the studio has 285 permanent employees in addition to more than 1,400 researchers worldwide for its Football Manager games. The studio is closely linked with War Child and has donated a percentage of each game sale directly to the charity since 2006, an initiative that has raised a total of more than £1.5 million. The studio has begun developing partnerships with leading football clubs and other organisations in recent years. These include Manchester City F.C., Brighton & Hove Albion F.C., Brentford F.C., Burnley F.C., Venezia FC, and Stormzy's project Merky FC. On 29 May 2024, the studio launched a rebrand. Done in conjunction with design practice Monday Nights, the most significant element was the studio updating its logo for the first time since 2004.

In July 2026, Sports Interactive launched a professional football recruitment platform, FMDB Pro. Citing more than 40 global clients, including the Premier League and FIFA, FMDB Pro was described as offering "a scalable recruitment tool for clubs, organisations and federations across all levels of football".

== Games ==
- Championship Manager
  - Championship Manager
  - Championship Manager '93
  - Championship Manager 2
  - Championship Manager 96/97
  - Championship Manager 97/98
  - Championship Manager 3
  - Championship Manager: Season 99/00
  - Championship Manager: Season 00/01
  - Championship Manager: Season 01/02
  - Championship Manager 4
  - Championship Manager: Season 03/04
- Football Manager
  - Football Manager 2005 (4 November 2004 for PC and Mac)
  - Football Manager 2006 (21 October 2005 for PC, Mac, and PSP, and 13 April 2006 for Xbox 360)
  - Football Manager 2007 (20 October 2006 for PC and Mac and December 2006 for PSP and Xbox 360)
  - Football Manager 2008 (October 2007 for PC and Mac and March 2008 for PSP and Xbox 360)
  - Football Manager 2009 (14 November 2008 for PC, Mac, and PSP)
  - Football Manager Live (23 January 2009)
  - Football Manager 2010 (30 October 2009 for PC, Mac, and PSP, and April 2010 for IPhone)
  - Football Manager 2011 (5 November 2010 for PC and Mac, December 2010 for PSP and iPhone, and April 2011 for iPad)
  - Football Manager 2012 (21 October 2011 for PC, Mac, and PSP, December 2011 for iPhone and iPad, and April 2012 for Android)
  - Football Manager 2013 (2 November 2012 for PC, Mac, PSP, iOS, and Android)
  - Football Manager 2014 (31 October 2013 for PC, Mac, Linux, iOS, Android, and PSP Vita)
  - Football Manager 2015 (7 November 2014 for PC, Mac, Linux, iOS, and Android)
  - Football Manager 2016 (13 November 2015 for PC, Mac, and Linux)
  - Football Manager 2017 (4 November 2016 for PC, Mac, and Linux)
  - Football Manager 2018 (10 November 2017 for PC, Mac, and Linux)
  - Football Manager 2019 (2 November 2018 for PC, Mac, and Nintendo Switch)
  - Football Manager 2020 (18 November 2019 for PC, Mac, Nintendo Switch, Android, iOS, and Stadia)
  - Football Manager 2021 (24 November 2020 for PC, macOS, iOS, Android, Xbox One, Xbox Series X/S, and Nintendo Switch)
  - Football Manager 2022 (8 November 2021 for PC, macOS, iOS, Android, Xbox One, Xbox Series X/S, and Nintendo Switch)
  - Football Manager 2023 (8 November 2022 for PC, macOS, iOS, Apple Arcade, Android, Xbox One, Xbox Series X/S, Nintendo Switch, and PS5)
  - Football Manager 2024 (6 November 2023 for PC, macOS, iOS, Apple Arcade, Android, Xbox One, Xbox Series X/S, Nintendo Switch, and PS5)
  - Football Manager 26 (4 November 2025 for PC, macOS, iOS, Apple Arcade, Android, Xbox One, Xbox Series X/S, Nintendo Switch, and PS5)
  - Football Manager 27 (10 November 2026 for PC, macOS, iOS, Apple Arcade, Android, Xbox Series X/S, and PS5)
- Eastside Hockey Manager
  - NHL Eastside Hockey Manager (2 July 2004)
  - NHL Eastside Hockey Manager 2005 (27 May 2005)
  - NHL Eastside Hockey Manager 2005 (North American version) (27 September 2005)
  - NHL Eastside Hockey Manager 2007 (22 September 2006)
  - NHL Eastside Hockey Manager 2015 (26 March 2015)
- Out of the Park Baseball Manager
  - Out of the Park Baseball Manager 2006 (31 May 2006)
  - Out of the Park Baseball Manager 2007 (23 March 2007)

== Accolades ==
The Collyers were appointed members of the Order of the British Empire (OBE) in the 2010 New Year Honours for services to the video game industry. At the 2011 New Year Honours, Miles Jacobson was appointed an OBE.

In 2021, Sports Interactive were won a Best Places to Work Award at the GamesIndustry.Biz Best Places to Work Awards. They won the same accolade again in 2023.

In 2022, the studio won the MCV/Develop Legend Award at the 2022 MCV/Develop Awards.

In May 2024, the studio was nominated for both the Sustainability Star Award and Best Mobile Game at the Develop:Star Awards. At the event on 10 July 2024, Sports Interactive received the Develop:Star Award, the event's lifetime achievement gong, in recognition of three decades of achievement and wider contribution to the games industry. The studio was nominated for Best EDI initiative at the 2026 Develop:Star Awards for its Missing Managers campaign launched alongside Sky Sports, Xbox and McCann London.
