= Miles Jacobson =

British businessman

Miles Jacobson OBE
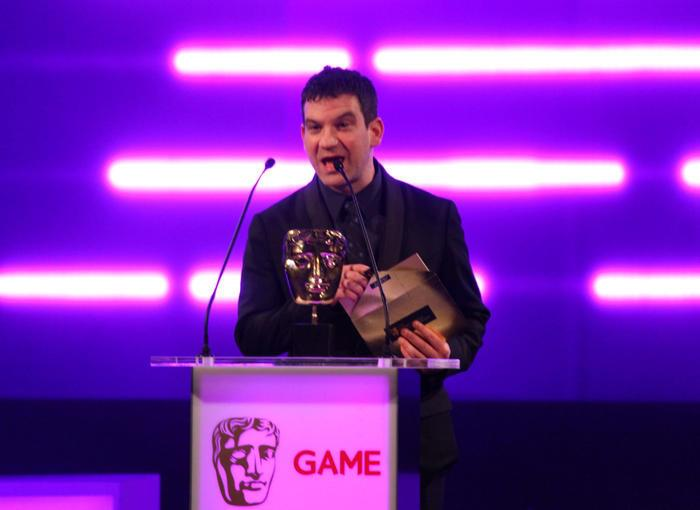
- Miles Jacobson presenting the Sports & Fitness category at BAFTA Games Awards 2012
- Occupation: Studio director
- Employer: Sports Interactive
- Known for: Football Manager games

Miles Jacobson OBE is studio director of Sports Interactive, the team behind the Football Manager series of video games, and creators of the original Championship Manager.

== Early life ==
Jacobson was born in 1971 to a Jewish family. His father was an inventor and his mother was a teacher. Jacobson was raised in Watford. A talented musician, his childhood ambition was to become a singer, and he spent more time on music than education when at school, singing or playing at the Royal Opera House, Royal Albert Hall, Royal Festival Hall, the Barbican and St Martin-in-the-Fields during this time, and appeared in Carmen alongside José Carreras. However his singing ability was affected by the voice change during puberty. He attended Haberdashers' Aske's Boys' School on a scholarship – fellow pupils at the time included Matt Lucas and Sacha Baron Cohen. He also became a fan of Watford F.C. in his childhood, attending his first game at Vicarage Road on his seventh birthday. His interest in and love for music sowed the seeds for his early career; while working in a record shop he produced a fanzine which caught the eye of the then NME editor Steve Lamacq. Lamacq helped Jacobson to secure his first position in the music business, introducing him to Andy Ross of Food Records, who hired him as an A&R manager. During his time in the music business (with Food and Polygram Island Music), Jacobson worked with a number of household names, including Jesus Jones, Dubstar, Shampoo, Blur, Feeder, Fatboy Slim and The Bluetones.

== Sports Interactive ==
Sports Interactive was founded in 1994 by Paul and Oliver Collyer on the back of the success they had achieved with a game they had originally created in their Shropshire bedrooms in the late 1980s. That game was first published commercially in 1992 as Championship Manager.

Jacobson first became involved in Sports Interactive as a fan of the game, after obtaining an advance copy of Championship Manager 2 in exchange for two Blur concert tickets, offering his services as one of the early testers. The Collyer brothers realised that Jacobson's abilities and experience would be put to better use in other areas and he became the fledgling company's unofficial business advisor. Jacobson quickly became an integral part of the team, assuming the role of part-time Managing Director in 1999 before finally taking the helm on a full-time basis in 2001.

Under Jacobson's management, Sports Interactive has grown from a small start-up employing five people to one of the best-known names in UK game development with a staff of more than 280 and a network of roughly 1,400 researchers across the globe. The studio has won two GamesIndustry.biz Best Places to Work Awards in recent years, one in 2021 and another in 2023.

To date, the studio has sold more than 15 million games, has been responsible for six of the top 10 fastest-selling PC games of all time in the UK (five of which are from the Football Manager series) and has enjoyed more than 200 weeks at No. 1 in the PC charts. Sports Interactive also has been responsible for five of the top 20 best-selling PC games of all time in the UK.

The Football Manager catalogue has continued to grow, including versions for both iOS and Android devices, along with console versions for both Nintendo Switch and Xbox being launched in recent years. The company also previously developed Football Manager Online and Football Manager Live, a large online multiplayer version, in association with Korean company, KTH. In 2022 the studio released their first title on Apple Arcade before making their PS5 debut in early 2023. In November 2023, the studio's Football Manager Mobile series became a Netflix exclusive.

Football Manager players have accelerated rapidly in recent years, helped in part by the pandemic and by the studio working with subscription platforms like Game Pass, Apple Arcade, and Netflix. Football Manager 2023 became the first of the studio's titles to break five million players, while FM24 hit more than seven million players in less than 100 days. In September 2025, Jacobson revealed FM24 had reached 19.09 million players, extending its record as the most played game in the series by far.

== Charitable endeavours ==
Outside Sports Interactive, Jacobson is heavily involved with the War Child charity, working as part of its entertainment committee. This committee is responsible for music-based fundraising initiatives which include record releases (including the Heroes album, the Young Soul Rebels single) and live events which have, to date, included gigs featuring Kasabian, La Roux, Al Murray, Jason Manford, Madness, Plan B, The Killers and Coldplay (the latter pair's gig also involved an encore featuring Gary Barlow and Bono). War Child also receive a donation for each copy of Football Manager sold, raising more than £700,000 to date, and in 2011, Jacobson went on a trip with the charity to the Democratic Republic of Congo.

In 2008, Jacobson was one of the co-founders of GamesAid, a broker for charitable activity on behalf of the games industry (and sponsor of the Paddington Academy). He is also currently working on a charitable project in Mozambique, giving local villages business opportunities whilst also helping the environment by planting fruit trees which thrive in the area.

Jacobson has been involved with the Nordoff-Robbins music therapy charity for a number of years, forming part of a committee that organises the annual Legends of Football dinner. The dinners have raised more than £9m over the years, with the most recent honouring Ian Wright and Emma Hayes.

He also recently became a vice-president for the charity Special Effect, which makes gaming accessible for people with severe disabilities.

Jacobson was appointed to the role of Industry Ambassador for War Child in July 2022, having supported the charity for almost three decades.

== Other work and honours ==
A former Entrepreneur of the Year (London) finalist, Jacobson serves as a Creative Business Mentor for NESTA, is a Develop conference steering committee member, and has previously been on the steering committee for the Edinburgh Interactive Festival and was on the BAFTA steering committee for video games for 6 years until June 2012. In addition to making regular appearances on national TV and radio, Jacobson has also appeared as a panellist and interviewee at festivals and conferences, not just for the games industry, but also at the Edinburgh TV festival and conferences organised by the music business strategy consultancy MusicAlly.

In 2011, Jacobson was awarded the OBE in the Queen's New Year's Honours List for services to the gaming industry.
