= Collyer brothers (game designers) =

Two British video game designers and programmers

Paul Edward Collyer MBE and Oliver Charles Collyer MBE, collectively known as the Collyer brothers, are two British video game designers and programmers. In July 1994, they founded London-based video game developer Sports Interactive, under which they created popular video game franchises of football-based sports games, such as Championship Manager and Football Manager. The Collyer brothers often inserted themselves into their games as below-average players, not good enough to play for even the worst teams.

The Collyer brothers are supporters of Everton Both Collyers were appointed Member of the Order of the British Empire (MBE) in the 2010 New Year Honours for services to the video game industry.
