= Football Manager =

Series of association football management simulation games

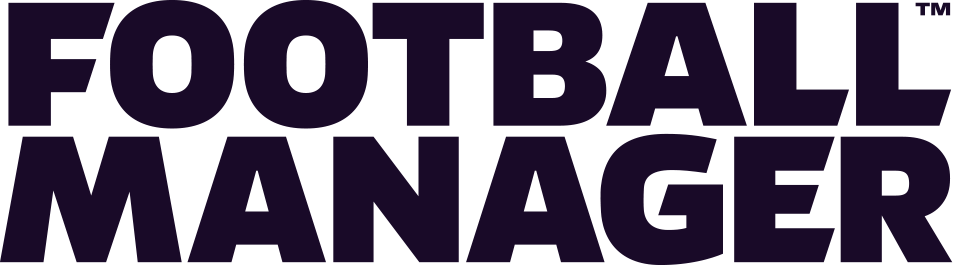
- Genre: Sports management
- Developer: Sports Interactive
- Publisher: Sega
- Platforms: Microsoft Windows, macOS, Linux, iOS, Android, PlayStation Portable, PlayStation Vita, Nintendo Switch, Xbox 360, Stadia, Xbox One, Xbox Series X, Xbox Series S, PlayStation 5, Netflix
- First release: Football Manager 2005; 5 November 2004
- Latest release: Football Manager 27; 10 November 2026

Football Manager, also known as Worldwide Soccer Manager in North America from 2004 to 2008, also known colloquially as FM, is a series of football management simulation video games developed by British developer Sports Interactive and published by Sega. The game began its life in 1992 as Championship Manager. Following the break-up of their partnership with original publishers Eidos Interactive, triggered by the fiasco release of Championship Manager 4 in 2003, Sports Interactive lost the naming rights to Eidos Interactive but retained the game engine and data, and re-branded the game Football Manager with their new publisher Sega. Football Manager 2024, released on 6 November 2023, is the most played title in series history, reaching over 20 million players as of October 2026. Football Manager 25, originally intended for a November 2024 release, was cancelled in February 2025 after multiple delays. The most recent game in the series, Football Manager 27, was released on 10 November 2026.

== Main series ==
=== Football Manager 2005 ===
On 12 February 2004, after splitting from publishers Eidos Interactive, it was announced that Sports Interactive, developers of the Championship Manager game, had retained the rights to the source code but not the rights to the title Championship Manager, which were held onto by Eidos (who previously acquired the brand rights from Domark upon their merger in 1995). These developments led to a further announcement that future Sports Interactive football management simulation games would be released under the famous Football Manager brand name. Whilst the Championship Manager series would go on, Eidos no longer had any source code or a developer for Championship Manager.

Having been left without a publisher for its football management series, Sports Interactive teamed up with Sega. In April 2006, Sports Interactive was acquired completely by the publisher in a continuing trend of consolidation within the games industry. The first game released under the newly acquired Football Manager brand was Football Manager 2005. Commonly known as FM 2005, it competed directly with Championship Manager 5 from Eidos-funded Beautiful Game Studios. Football Manager 2005 included an updated user interface, a refined game engine, updated database and competition rules, pre and post-match information, international player news, cup summary news, a 2D match engine, coach reports on squads, jobcentre for non-playing positions, mutual contract termination, enhanced player loan options, manager mind games, and various other features. Football Manager 2005 was released in the UK on 5 November 2004, closely followed by releases in many other countries around the world. The Macintosh (Mac) version of the game came on the same dual format disk as the Windows version, so its sales were also included. Football Manager 2005 became both the 5th fastest-selling PC game of all time and SEGA Europe's fastest selling game.

=== Football Manager 2006 ===
Football Manager 2006 for Windows and Mac OS was released in the UK on 21 October 2005 (two weeks earlier than the originally stated 4 November 2005 release). On the same day as the game's release, Sports Interactive also released a patch to fix some bugs discovered during the Beta and Gold stages of development. In its first week of release, it became the second-fastest-selling PC game of all time in the UK.

Essentially a season update of FM 2005, it includes many small adjustments and improvements to the general gameplay. These adjustments include team-talks, simplified training, and in-game help screens. Furthermore, the game is updated by its many researchers (unpaid fans of the game augmented by in-house collaboration). The database is usually updated twice in the period of the release of the game. The first comes with the game and the second is usually downloadable in February as a free data update to reflect the changes which take place during the winter opening of the FIFA transfer window. As has been customary with the series, a beta demo of the game was released on 12 September 2005. This was later followed on 30 September 2005 by a gold demo. This is a cut-down, limited time version of the full game, which is sent to the game manufacturers. With a special download from Sports Interactive, one can play as the fictional football team Harchester United from Sky One's series Dream Team.

==== Football Manager 2006 – Xbox 360 ====
The Xbox 360 version was released on 13 April 2006 and is the first home console game in the Football Manager series. The full 50 playable league systems are included, as well as a 250,000-strong player database (very near to the figure of the PC version). Due to the large save files of the game, which is region free, the Xbox 360 hard disk drive is required. This version also makes use of the Xbox Live functionality, allowing players to create online leagues and cups with up to 16 human-controlled teams using team data they have exported from their offline game. Voice chat is fully supported during online play. It was also confirmed that Sports Interactive would release new content through the Xbox Live Marketplace system.

=== Football Manager 2007 ===
On 8 June 2006, Sports Interactive published details on Football Manager 2007. On 1 October 2006, Sports Interactive released a Gold Demo of Football Manager 2007, available in two versions: vanilla and strawberry. Both versions allow users to play six months into a season. The strawberry version contains a larger collection of quickstarts so users can try out more leagues. It also contains more graphics than the vanilla version. Football Manager 2007 was released on 18 October 2006.

New features in the 2007 version of Football Manager include the ability to include pictures for the player as the manager, substantially increased media interaction such as approaches from national newspaper journalists about the upcoming match or asking for comments on a player's performance in recent matches, and new varying degrees of criticism or praise for players (happy with form or very pleased with form rather than just one generic good term). A similar feature has been included for such actions as admiring players or attempting to unsettle transfer targets. Improvements have also been made to board request interactions.

The main improvement lauded by Sports Interactive for this version of Football Manager is the improved scouting system. Scouts' and coaches' experience is now shown graphically via bar charts and scouts gain knowledge from areas they have scouted previously. To go with this, it is now possible to get feeder/parent club status, which allows to either send players to lower league teams to gain experience, make it easier to get work permits, merchandise sales in other areas, or, as a lower league team, to receive reserve and youth team players on free, season long loans and to generate extra revenue through associated fees and friendly matches. A patch has been released to combat some of the main bugs in the game, such as unrealistic scout reports and high amounts of injuries sustained whilst playing on the pitch. On 27 July 2007, the Football Manager website was updated with a new Football Manager 2008 section.

=== Football Manager 2008 ===
On 3 October 2007, Sega Europe Ltd and Sports Interactive announced Football Manager 2008 to be released 19 October. The release date was brought forward by a day to 18 October 2007 due to some retailers shipping the game early. There were a number of new features: all features in matches seamlessly follow on from the previous one; a mini radar pitch appears during tactical changes; improved International management; new skin; advisor system; improved notebook system; a revamped captain selection; improved board and fan confidence system; transfer centre to track transfers; improved match engine; the player may change pitch dimensions; award system overhaul; in-game all-time best elevens; a revamped finance system; collective win bonuses; FaceGen system for new-gen players; and a new calendar.

=== Football Manager 2009 ===
On 3 September 2008, Sports Interactive released a preview video announcing Football Manager 2009 to be released on 14 November. The main difference from past versions was the inclusion of a 3D match engine for the first time in the game's history. Other new features included the ability to have female managers and staff, a new press conference system, more in-depth feedback from assistant manager, and a more realistic transfer system. The latest incarnation of Football Manager was also released in DVD format for the first time.

The use of online-activation DRM utilised by Sports Interactive resulted in issues for consumers activating either online, or phone. This was the result of a well orchestrated DDoS attack launched upon activation servers and phone lines, resulting in many users on the Windows platform unable to activate and play. On 17 December 2008, Sports Interactive announced a deal with Arsenal F.C. to release an exclusive version of Football Manager 2009, containing all official Arsenal squad player pictures, and an exclusive skin in Arsenal's colours. Shortly following this announcement, Sports Interactive reinforced their pursuit of online retailers by offering Football Manager 2009 through eSellerate for the Mac OS X platform on 23 December 2008. This is the first incarnation of the game to be available to global users through online distribution.

=== Football Manager 2010 ===
On 12 August 2009, Sports Interactive & Sega Europe Ltd. announced that Football Manager 2010 for PC and Apple Macintosh, and Football Manager Handheld 2010 for PlayStation Portable was to be released on 30 October 2009. The include competitions are Challenge Cup and Challenge Cup qualification, as well as the Caribbean Championship. This version of Football Manager has been very successful, managing to gain the number 1 spot in the gaming charts. There have been many improvements made to Football Manager 2010, including the following:

- Totally revamped user interface making it simpler and quicker to find the information.
- Match Analysis tool showing the actions of each player on the pitch, allowing to pinpoint any team's strengths and weaknesses.
- Making changes from the touchline by shouting instructions from the touchline instantly.
- Included two new national teams (Zanzibar and Tuvalu).

=== Football Manager 2011 ===
Football Manager 2011 was released on 5 November 2010. On 23 July 2010, a number of features and the design of the box were leaked before an official announcement could be made, including:

- Improved training options
- More complex module for searching new players
- Improved graphics and 3D view of the game
- Introduction of football agents to the game
- Playing games in evenings (night effect)
- Differentiated weather conditions

=== Football Manager 2012 ===
Football Manager 2012 was released on 21 October 2011.

- Transfers & Contracts – significant changes to the transfer and contract systems
- Scouting improvements – a new much detailed in-game report has been devised
- 3D Match Improvements – new animations, new crowd system, and more stadiums
- Manage Anywhere, Anytime – the ability to add or take away playable nations
- Tone – new system allowing to specify the way to say things
- Intelligent Interface – a new adaptive layout system, new filters, and more
- New national team – Kiribati

=== Football Manager 2013 ===
In a press conference in early September 2012, the makers of the Football Manager series revealed a few new features in Football Manager 2013. These included the addition of a director of football, being able to give certain roles to other staff that managers would have to do themselves in previous games, taxes, a new way of making loan deals and the addition of Classic Mode where players could go through one season in eight hours without having to customize training or deal with team talk. On 28 September 2012, the release date was announced as 2 November 2012. If the game is pre-ordered, a beta version of the game would be available two weeks prior to 2 November 2012, with any saved data being able to be transferred to the release version. The South Sudan national football team was added.

=== Football Manager 2014 ===
In August 2013, the Sports Interactive official website unveiled the main tweaks and upgrades to be added in Football Manager 2014, the most noticeable being the decision to release a simultaneous version for the Linux operating system. Among the other changes announced were extended options in transfer and contract negotiations, as well as player conversations, the ability to play with more than just three nations loaded in Classic Mode, a tactical overhaul, and improvements to the 3D match engine. Studio director and long-time Football Manager lead Miles Jacobson also stated that for a week in mid-August 2013 that he would announce one new feature every day via his Twitter feed, the first feature being the ability to arrange testimonial matches. On 13 September 2013, the release date was announced as 31 October 2013. If the game is pre-ordered, a beta version of the game would be available two weeks prior to 31 October 2013, with any saved data being able to be transferred to the release version.

=== Football Manager 2017 ===
Football Manager 2017 was released worldwide for Windows, macOS and Linux on 4 November 2016. It introduced a redesigned inbox system intended to make the management experience more streamlined, with messages becoming more contextual and allowing certain actions to be completed directly without navigating additional menus. The 3D match engine received major upgrades, including over 1,500 new motion-captured animations, improved artificial intelligence, enhanced stadia and realistic LED advertising hoardings.

New staff roles such as Data Analysts and Sports Scientists were added to help managers interpret player statistics and maintain fitness levels. The Fantasy Draft mode returned with a new single-player version, while a Social Feed was introduced to reflect fan and media reactions to match results and transfers.

Football Manager 2017 also allowed players to import their own likeness into the match engine using FaceGen technology, displaying a 3D model of the manager on the touchline. It was the final title in the series to feature 2D generated newgen faces, which were reworked for this edition but drew criticism from players who viewed them as a downgrade from previous versions.

A copy of Football Manager Touch 2017 was included with all purchases of the PC, Mac and Linux editions, and was also made available separately.

=== Football Manager 2018 ===
Football Manager 2018 was released worldwide on 10 November 2017 for Windows, macOS and Linux. It introduced a new dynamic system that allowed managers to view team hierarchies, social groups and overall squad cohesion in greater detail. The scouting system was redesigned to resemble real-world recruitment methods, with scouts’ knowledge of players now measured on a 0–100 percent scale. A Medical Centre feature was added to monitor player fitness and injury risk, while the match engine received visual and presentation improvements through an upgraded graphics engine and redesigned tactical interface.

This edition also marked the first appearance of 3D dynamically generated faces for newgen players, replacing the 2D portraits used since Football Manager 2008. The new system made the faces non-modifiable, ending a popular community practice from earlier titles, and received mixed reactions from players who preferred the older 2D designs.

For the first time in the series, newgen players could come out as homosexual, which could lead to a boost in the club's commercial revenue through increased shirt sales. The feature applied only to fictional players and not to real-world footballers. A Nintendo Switch version was released on 13 April 2018.

=== Football Manager 2024 ===
Football Manager 2024 was released on 6 November 2023. It became the most played title in series history by far, with over 20 million players as of October 2026.

=== Football Manager 25 ===
A planned title, Football Manager 25, using the Unity game engine, was originally scheduled for release in early November 2024. However, its release was postponed to late November then quickly postponed again to March 2025, before ultimately being cancelled in February 2025.

The game was set to feature the series debut of women's football; however, several features were slated for removal – international football, create-a-club, touchline shouts, in-game social media, versus mode, challenge mode and fantasy draft – mostly with the aim of meeting release date targets with the promise that most would return in future installments.

=== Football Manager 26 ===
On 13 August 2025, Football Manager 26 was officially announced as the next installment in the series, following the cancellation of Football Manager 25. The game announcement was accompanied by a short trailer showcasing the inclusion of the Premier League license in-game. Sports Interactive later announced the game would be released on 4 November 2025. It was the first Football Manager game to include women's football leagues. FM26 was the second most popular release in the series, after FM24, reaching just under 10 million players.

=== Football Manager 27 ===
On 11 August 2026, Sports Interactive announced that playtesting for the next edition in the series, FM27, would be open to a wider group of players than before, and gave fans the chance to register their interest to be part of the testing group. In September, the release date for FM27 was announced as 10 November. Ahead of launch, FM27 will have an entirely free-to-play period from 29 October to 3 November, with a launch preview for those who have pre-ordered the game from 3 November until the full release on 10 November.

== Other games ==
=== Football Manager Mobile ===
Football Manager Mobile, known as Football Manager Handheld (FMH) upon inception, was first released on 13 April 2006 on PlayStation Portable (PSP). This was Sports Interactive's first ever game for a handheld console and was designed to be a separate game and play somewhat differently from the PC/Mac versions of the game due to the different nature of the handheld consoles. The game was designed to be more similar in feel and play to earlier Sports Interactive products, being much faster in nature while retaining the feeling of being a realistic simulation.

In April 2010, the game became available on the iOS products. The iOS version of the game is very different in nature to that on the PSP and it contains a wholly new UI because of the touch screen nature of those devices. In April 2012, the game was also made available on Android devices in a version very similar in nature to the iOS version. In 2015, a new 2D match engine was introduced for iOS and Android devices, as well as an opportunity to purchase an in-game editor. These early version of the mobile game utilized the PISD Ltd technology to target the handheld markets. The 2016 edition of the game saw its name change to Football Manager Mobile. In 2018, Football Manager Mobile was ranked number 10 on paid games. In 2020, Football Manager Mobile 2020 became the first game in the series to reach 1 million downloads on all platforms. In 2023, Football Manager 2024 Mobile was released as a Netflix Games exclusive on both iOS and Android.

=== Football Manager Live ===
On 20 April 2007, Sega Europe Ltd and Sports Interactive released details for Football Manager Live, which would be a brand new massively multiplayer online game based on PISD Ltd technology. Released on 4 November 2008, Football Manager Live had its roots set in the Football Manager series but was designed specifically as a massively multiplayer online game. On 12 December 2008, the first Community Day was arranged by Sports Interactive and Sega. The future of the series and many other matters were discussed with a number of fans who decided to show up for the event. On 14 April 2011, it was announced that Football Manager Live would be discontinued after all Gameworlds (servers) completed their next season (28 day period), which was due around the end of May 2011.

=== Football Manager Online ===
On 12 March 2015, Sega Publishing Korea Ltd. and Sports Interactive released details for Football Manager Online, which would be a brand new massively multiplayer online game.

=== Football Manager Touch ===
A successor to Football Manager Handheld and Football Manager Classic, the Football Manager Touch series began in 2015 with the release of Football Manager Touch 2016. The game was available on iPad and Android tablets, as well as via Steam. In 2018, the studio began releasing editions of Football Manager Touch on the Nintendo Switch. It was released in this way through to Football Manager Touch 2022, when the tablet, Steam, and Epic Games Store versions was discontinued and it was only released on Nintendo Switch. Tablet users got access to the game again from Football Manager Touch 2023 onwards when the studio signed a deal with Apple to release it on Apple Arcade.

=== Sonic & All-Stars Racing Transformed ===
Football Manager is represented with a racer named Football Manager in the cross-over game Sonic & All-Stars Racing Transformed, and is exclusive to the PC version of the game.

=== Sega Football Club Champions ===
Sega Football Club Champions is an entry in the Pro Soccer Club o Tsukurō! series (other titles are 90 Minutes, Let's Make a Soccer Team!, Football Stars Collection and Sega Pocket Club Manager). Sega Football Club Champions uses the engine from recent Football Manager games.

== Influence ==
Football Manager has been recognized by real-life football clubs as a source for scouting players. In 2008, Everton F.C. signed a deal with Sports Interactive allowing them to use the game's database to scout players and opposition. A video documentary entitled Football Manager: More Than Just A Game was produced by journalism graduate and MA student Stephen Milnes and released in October 2010. Another documentary by FilmNova entitled An Alternative Reality: The Football Manager Documentary was released in the UK cinemas in October 2014 followed by a release on Steam in March 2015.

Football Manager celebrated its twentieth birthday in the summer of 2012. To celebrate this milestone, Back Page Press released a book including interviews with the creators and players that became legends in-game. Another part of the book included stories about how the game has taken over one's life. In November 2012, Azerbaijani student Vugar Huseynzade was promoted to manager of FC Baku's reserve team based on his success in Football Manager. In 2013, stand-up comedian Tony Jameson performed a show called Football Manager Ruined My Life; it was well received at the Edinburgh Festival, before going on to have a successful touring run, culminating in the show being filmed and released on DVD and Steam.

In the 2000s, an anonymous player of Football Manager tipped the Philippine Football Federation regarding the eligibility of Phil and James Younghusband to play for the Philippines men's national football team through the video game. In 2005, the brothers who were then part of the Chelsea youth program were successfully called up to the national team. Phil Younghusband would later become the top goalscorer for the Philippines with at least 50 goals credited to his name.

In 2020, a part-time Football Manager researcher discovered Blackburn Rovers forward Ben Brereton was half-Chilean via a club interview from 2018; they added Brereton's second nationality to the game database. Brereton would regularly be called up by the Chile national football team in the Football Manager 2021 game, which prompted interest from a Chilean Football Manager streamer. Brereton received encouragement from Chile head coach Reinaldo Rueda and began the application process for a Chilean passport. Martín Lasarte, who succeeded Rueda in February 2021, called up the Rovers forward for the first time in May 2021. He was an unused substitute in Chile's two 2022 FIFA World Cup qualification fixtures in June before making his debut as a substitute in the Copa América against Argentina.

Belgian manager Will Still credits the game as part of his influence to become a manager whilst playing for Sint-Truidense V.V.'s youth set up, before taking up assistant roles with Preston North End, Lierse, and eventually becoming manager of Beerschot, leading them to a 9th-place finish in First Division A. Still took over the role of manager of French Ligue 1 side Stade de Reims, which became notable in the news due to the fact Still had yet to receive his UEFA Pro License, a requirement for the French top division, resulting in a £22,000 fine for each game Still manages.

In late 2023, Football Manager launched a campaign with McCann London and Microsoft to give a Football Manager 2024 console player the chance to work for Vanarama National League club Bromley F.C. Nathan Owolabi was given the position of Support Tactician at Bromley and his journey was documented by broadcaster TNT Sports. In 2025, Football Manager launched a follow-up campaign with McCann London, Microsoft and Sky Sports known as Missing Managers, giving the chance for female players of FM26 the opportunity to earn real coaching qualifications supported by The Powerhouse Project.

In June 2024, FIFA announced that its FIFAe World Cup esports tournament series would feature a Football Manager tournament, known as the "FIFAe World Cup of Football Manager". This tournament would feature a US$100,000 prize pool. Team Indonesia, led by manager Ichsan Taufiq, won the FIFAe World Cup featuring Football Manager, beating Team Germany, led by manager Sven Goly, 8–2 on aggregate in the final.

== Academic attention ==
Football Manager has been the object of a sociological study where it is concluded that not only football culture is essential to fully live the gaming experience but also gamers build their sporting identity by playing the game. Other media like films are described as providing only restrictive narratives to the sports fans while in contrast, sports video games in general and Football Manager in particular provide more fluid narratives, and a wealth of information that helps construct the identity of the football fan, beyond sport itself.

The Football Manager gaming online community has been studied as a workforce to co-construct the crowdsourced database of football players that the game relies on to simulate football matches and careers. The mutual influence of the game and real life football is described as twofold. First, database players simulated potential and real life transfer market activity are mutually shaping each other. The other mutual influence highlighted are the real life football and game metrics that quantify and measure the footballing activity.

== See also ==
- Premier Manager
- FIFA Manager
