= List of Sega video game consoles =

Video game consoles by the developer

Sega's official logo

Sega is a video game developer, publisher, and hardware development company headquartered in Tokyo, Japan, with multiple offices around the world. The company has produced home video game consoles and handheld consoles since 1983; these systems were released from the third console generation to the sixth. Sega was formed from the merger of slot machine developer Service Games and arcade game manufacturer Rosen Enterprises in 1964, and it produced arcade games for the next two decades. After a downturn in the arcade game industry in the 1980s, the company transitioned to developing and publishing video games and consoles. The first Sega console was the Japan-only SG-1000, released in 1983. Sega released three variations of this console in Japan, the third of which, the Sega Mark III, was rebranded as the Master System and released worldwide in 1985. They went on to produce the Genesis—known as the Mega Drive outside of North America—and its add-ons beginning in 1988, the Game Gear handheld console in 1990, the Sega Saturn in 1994, and the Dreamcast in 1998.

Sega was one of the primary competitors to Nintendo in the video game console industry. A few of Sega's early consoles outsold their competitors in specific markets, such as the Master System in Europe. Several of the company's later consoles were commercial failures, however, and the financial losses incurred from the Dreamcast console caused the company to restructure itself in 2001. As a result, Sega ceased to manufacture consoles and became a third-party video game developer. The only consoles that Sega has produced since are the educational toy consoles Advanced Pico Beena in 2005 and ePico in 2024, and dedicated consoles such as the Sega Genesis Mini in 2019 and Game Gear Micro in 2020. Third-party variants of Sega consoles have been produced by licensed manufacturers, even after production of the original consoles had ended. Many of these variants have been produced in Brazil, where versions of the Master System and Genesis were still sold and games for them are still developed decades after the consoles were originally released.

== Consoles ==
Consoles
Console	Release date(s)	Discontinuation date(s)	Generation	Notes	Picture
SG-1000	JP: July 15, 1983	JP: October 1985	Third	Sega's first home console, created in an attempt to transition from the arcade game industry; Also known as the Sega Computer Videogame SG-1000; Plays ROM cartridges; Upgraded version with detachable controllers that can play Sega Card games in addition to cartridges released as the SG-1000 II; Computer versions with a built-in keyboard which plays Sega Card games released as the SC-3000 and SC-3000H; Not commercially successful, because of the number of consoles on the market already and the release of the Famicom by Nintendo on the same day	
WW: Master System; JP: Sega Mark III	JP: October 1985; NA: 1986; EU: 1987	JP: 1989; NA: 1992; EU: 1996	Third	Sega's second major home console, released worldwide; Initially released in Japan as the Sega Mark III, the third version of the SG-1000, before being redesigned and rebranded as the Master System; Plays both Sega Card games and ROM cartridges; Smaller and cheaper version of the console named the Master System II was released in 1990; it only plays ROM cartridges and sold poorly; Unsuccessfully competed with Nintendo's Famicom in Japan and North America, but was commercially successful in Europe	
WW: Mega Drive; NA: Genesis	JP: October 29, 1988; NA: August 14, 1989; EU: November 30, 1990	WW: 1997	Fourth	Named the Mega Drive outside North America and the Genesis within North America; Sega's third major home console, after the SG-1000 and Master System; released worldwide; Plays ROM cartridges; A computer with an integrated Mega Drive was released in Japan as the Sega TeraDrive in 1991; Another computer with an integrated Mega Drive was released in Europe by Amstrad in 1993, the Mega PC.; A smaller, lighter version of the console named the Genesis II was released in 1993; The Genesis Nomad, a handheld version of the console that plays the same cartridges, released in 1995; an early version for use on Japanese airplanes was named the Mega Jet; The Sega Meganet Internet service in Japan with the Mega Modem peripheral provided downloadable titles, some exclusive to the service, starting in 1990; it was replaced with the similar Sega Channel service in 1993; Although the system was officially discontinued in 1997, third-party variants have been released around the world as recently as 2009; Outsold by its main competitors, Nintendo's Super Famicom and NEC's PC Engine, in Japan, but was more successful in some other regions, such as the United States	
Game Gear	JP: October 6, 1990; NA: April 26, 1991; EU: April 26, 1991	JP: 1996; NA: April 30, 1997; EU: April 30, 1997	Fourth	Sega's first handheld game console, released worldwide; Similar to the Master System, though it cannot play Master System games without a Master System Converter accessory; Plays ROM cartridges; Commercially successful, though it was outsold by its primary competitor, Nintendo's Game Boy	
WW: Mega-CD; NA: Sega CD	JP: December 12, 1991; NA: October 15, 1992; EU: 1993	WW: 1996	Fourth	Named the Mega-CD outside North America and the Sega CD within North America; Add-on device for the Genesis with its own exclusive library; Adds CD-ROM support as well as more processing power; Second version named the Sega CD 2 was released in 1993 to correspond with the second version of the Genesis; Portable combination of the Genesis and Sega CD named the Genesis CDX in the United States and the Multi-Mega in the PAL region released in 1994; Sold poorly compared to the Genesis itself	
Sega Pico	JP: June 26, 1993; NA: November 1994; EU: 1994	JP: 2005; NA: February 1998; EU: 1997	Fourth	Video game console aimed at young children, released worldwide; Named the Kids Computer Pico in Japan; Plays ROM cartridges shaped like books; Controlled via a stylus and a graphics tablet; Sold very well in Japan but poorly elsewhere	
32X	JP: December 3, 1994; NA: November 21, 1994; EU: January 1995	WW: 1996	Fifth	Add-on for the Genesis with its own exclusive library; Adds more processing power and support for 32-bit games to the 16-bit Genesis; Plays different ROM cartridges from the Genesis itself; Combination release of the Genesis and the 32X codenamed "Neptune" was planned for release in late 1995, but was delayed and then cancelled when the 32X was discontinued; Considered a commercial failure	
Sega Saturn	JP: November 22, 1994; NA: May 11, 1995; EU: July 8, 1995	WW: 1998	Fifth	Sega's fourth major home console and only release in the 32-bit console generation, released worldwide; Plays CD-ROM games; Released simultaneously with the 32X, which also plays 32-bit games; Sega NetLink accessory, released in 1996, provided Internet and multiplayer gaming access; in Japan it used the SegaNet Internet service; Second version of the console code-named Sega Pluto, with a built-in NetLink component, was planned but never released; Sold significantly fewer units worldwide than its competitors the Sony PlayStation and Nintendo 64.	
Dreamcast	JP: November 27, 1998; NA: September 9, 1999; EU: October 14, 1999	WW: March 30, 2001	Sixth	Sega's fifth and final major home console and only major release in the sixth console generation, released worldwide; Plays GD-ROM games; Includes a built-in modem, which could connect to the SegaNet Internet service in Japan and North America and the Dreamarena service in Europe; VMU accessory serves as a combination memory card, second screen, and simple handheld console; Sold significantly fewer units than its main competitor the Sony PlayStation 2 because of a lack of DVD support	
Advanced Pico Beena	JP: August 6, 2005	2011	Sixth	Video game console aimed at young children, released only in Japan; Successor to the 1993 Sega Pico; Plays ROM cartridges shaped like books; Cheaper version named the Beena Lite was released in 2008.; Never officially discontinued, but no games have been released since 2011	
WW: Mega Drive Mini; NA: Sega Genesis Mini	WW: September 19, 2019; EU, ME: October 4, 2019	Before 2022	Eighth	Miniature dedicated console modeled on the Sega Genesis; Plays 40 preinstalled Genesis games, with emulation software by M2; Includes full-size replica controllers that connect through USB	
Game Gear Micro	JP: October 6, 2020	2020	Eighth	Produced to commemorate Sega's 60th anniversary, released only in Japan; Line of miniature dedicated consoles modeled on the Game Gear; Four color variants, each containing four Game Gear games; Powered by two AAA batteries or a USB charger	
WW: Mega Drive Mini 2; NA: Sega Genesis Mini 2	WW: October 27, 2022	2022	Ninth	Successor to the Sega Genesis Mini; Released exclusively through Amazon, due to more limited supply; Miniature dedicated console modeled on the Model 2 Genesis; Plays 61 preinstalled games, including Sega CD games; Compatible with the original Genesis Mini's accessories	
ePico	JP: October 10, 2024	N/A	Ninth	Video game console aimed at young children, released only in Japan; Successor to the 2005 Advanced Pico Beena; Plays ROM cartridges shaped like books that can be interacted with using a pen accessory	

== Third-party variants ==
Licensed and unlicensed variants of Sega consoles have been produced by third-party companies. In Brazil, Tectoy created and released the Master System 3 Compact, which may function wirelessly with an RF transmitter. An SKU of this console targeted at female gamers, the Master System Girl, was molded in bright pink plastic. A more recent version, released in 2006 in Brazil as the Master System 3 Collection, contains 120 built-in games. Another Master System variant, built as a handheld game console, was released by Coleco in North America in 2006.

The Genesis was the first Sega console to receive third-party versions. Its first variants were released before any Master System variants, even though the Genesis was released three years after the Master System. Working with Sega Enterprises, JVC released the Wondermega, a Mega Drive and Mega-CD combination with high quality audio, in Japan on April 1, 1992. The system was later redesigned by JVC and released as the X'Eye in North America in September 1994. A Pioneer LaserActive add-on pack, developed by Sega, allows the system to play Genesis and Sega CD games. Aiwa released the CSD-GM1, a combination Genesis/Sega CD unit built into a boombox. Several companies added the Genesis to personal computers, mimicking the design of Sega's TeraDrive; these include the MSX models AX-330 and AX-990 distributed in Kuwait and Yemen, and the Amstrad Mega PC distributed in Europe and Australia. After the Genesis was discontinued, Majesco released the Genesis 3 in North America as a budget version of the console in 1998. Majesco also released a budget version of the Sega Pico in North America in August 1999.

In Brazil, where the Genesis never ceased production, Tectoy released a portable version of the Genesis with twenty built-in games on December 5, 2007. Another Tectoy variant of the console called "Mega Drive Guitar Idol", released in 2009 in Brazil, includes two six-button joypads and a guitar controller with five fret buttons. That year, AtGames began producing two new Genesis variants in North America and Europe: the Firecore, which can play Genesis cartridges as well as preloaded games; and a handheld console, the Sega Gopher, as well as a dedicated motion console, the Sega Zone, preloaded with 20 Genesis games. Companies such as Radica Games have released compilations of Genesis games in "plug-and-play" packages resembling the system's controller.
