= Text sim =

Text-based computer games

Text sims are computer or video games that focus on using a text based element to simulate some aspect of the real world. Text sims typically focus on creating as detailed a simulation of their object as possible, and therefore, other traditional game elements are often set aside in pursuit of creating an accurate simulation experience for the user. This pursuit of accurate simulation often comes at the expense of some or most audio or graphical elements. Numerous examples of soundless and graphic-light text sims exist.

The best selling text sim of all time is the Championship Manager/Football Manager series, published by Sports Interactive games, sold in America as Worldwide Soccer Manager. This soccer text simulation is an advanced version of a text sim with a 2D graphical sim engine for soccer games.

There are several genres of text sims. The most popular may be the sports text sim. In addition to the above-mentioned Football Manager, there are several text-based sim games in baseball, football, basketball, hockey, even wrestling. This genre is typically heavy is stats, and some games have been compared to spreadsheets with all of their detail to simulating the true environment of the sport. One of the flagship products of the sports text sim is Front Office Football, which is renowned for creating a very accurate experience as a general manager of a professional football team while also retaining a heavy statistical engine. Out of the Park Baseball is another example of such a sports sim with a true-to-life experience.

Another genre of text sims is the tycoon game genre. Although early entrants in the tycoon genre were graphically based, such as Railroad Tycoon and later Roller Coaster Tycoon, a large number of tycoon clones arose. The tycoon genre focuses on an economic simulation of one or more commercial elements. Many recent budget tycoon games have more in common with text sims than the original games, often retaining graphics merely as an interface to appeal to the general audience. Examples of these games include Coffee Tycoon, where a player runs a coffee shop franchise; Hollywood Mogul, where the player creates and runs a movie studio; and Starship Tycoon where the player manages a merchant spaceship plying the trade routes in the future. One of the earliest text sims was a simplistic economics-based game, called Lemonade Stand, where the player takes on the role of a child managing his lemonade stand.

A third text sim genre is the government simulation game. Political enterprises such as elections lend themselves well to the statistics-oriented text sim gaming. These text sims often focus on elections, although a few chose instead to focus on the running of a country. Due to the nature of this genre, it often relies on a graphical interface, typically a map. However, the game information is delivered in a text-based format. Examples of this genre include The Political Machine and Power Politics, where the player tries to win an election for the American presidency.

Yet another text sim genre is the real world simulation. These text sims try to manage a real world situation of some sort in a text based engine. Often this genre will try to use statistics to figure out some element of life. A recent example of this genre is Kudos, where a player simulates the life of a young person in their early twenties trying to decide what to do with life.

== Popular Text Sims ==
Sports Sims:

- Baseball Century
- Be The Coach Basketball
- Bowl Bound College Football
- Blue Chip College Football
- Baseball Mogul
- CSFBL (Computer Simulated Fantasy Baseball League)
- Deeproute
- Diamond Mind Baseball
- Draft Day Sports: Pro Basketball
- Draft Day Sports: College Basketball
- Eastside Hockey Manager series
- Extreme Warfare
- Fastbreak Basketball
- Fastbreak College Basketball
- Football Manager
- Football Mogul
- Football War Room
- Footy Fanatic
- Franchise Hockey Manager
- Front Office Football
- Hattrick
- Hooves of Thunder
- Inside the Park Baseball
- Jump Serve Volleyball
- Jump Shot Basketball
- Mulligan Tour Golf
- QuarterPole Plus
- Out of the Park Baseball
- Playasport Tennis Sim
- Professional Football Simulator
- PureSim
- Rapid Stats Baseball
- Sick as a Parrot
- Strat-O-Matic Baseball, Basketball, Football & Hockey
- Front Office Football: The College Years
- Title Bout Championship Boxing
- Total College Basketball
- Total Extreme Wrestling
- Total Pro Basketball
- Total Pro Football
- Total Pro Golf
- Tournament Dreams College Basketball
- Turn For Home Horse Racing

Tycoon/Business Sims:

- Chart Wars 3
- Coffee Tycoon
- Hollywood Mogul
- Lemonade Stand
- Lemonade Tycoon
- Music Wars
- Music Maven
- Railroad Tycoon
- Starship Tycoon
- TV Manager
- Wall Street Raider

Political Sims:

- Diplomacy
- The Political Machine
- Power Politics
- President 2000
