= Sega Zone (console) =

Home video game console

- Developer: AtGames
- Type: Video game console (Dedicated console)
- Released: 2010
- Introductory price: £49

The Sega Zone, also known as Sega Reactor, is a dedicated video game console released under license from Sega (through AtGames) in summer 2010. It has 20 built-in classic games from the Mega Drive/Genesis library. Of these 20 games, 16 of them have motion-control enabled. When released, it cost £49 in the UK.

== Games ==
20 licensed Sega Mega Drive games

- Kid Chameleon
- Chakan: The Forever Man
- Shinobi III: Return of the Ninja Master
- Sonic & Knuckles
- Sonic Spinball
- Alex Kidd in the Enchanted Castle
- Comix Zone
- Altered Beast
- Arrow Flash
- Bonanza Bros.
- The Ooze
- Crack Down
- Dr. Robotnik's Mean Bean Machine
- Ecco the Dolphin
- ESWAT: City Under Siege
- Fatal Labyrinth
- Flicky
- Gain Ground
- Golden Axe
- Jewel Master

16 Interactive Sports Games from the Zone 40

- Darts
- Curling
- Tennis
- Swimming
- Sword Of Warrior
- Fishing
- Badminton
- Super Shoot
- Baseball
- Golf
- Bowling
- Ping Pong
- Boxing
- Football (“Soccer” in the United States)
- Fencing
- Beach Volleyball

14 Arcade Games (Mega Drive games produced by TecToy, Microlab and AtGames)

- Jack's Pea
- Mahjong
- Warehouse Keeper
- Memory
- Spider
- Naval Power
- Mr Balls
- Cannon
- Bottle Taps Racer
- Bomber
- Checker
- Hexagonos
- Air Hockey
- Fight & Lose
