= Sega Gopher =

Portable version of the Sega Genesis

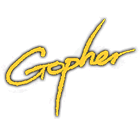
Logo

Sega Gopher (also known as Sega Genesis Arcade Ultimate Portable Player) is a portable version of the Sega Genesis manufactured by AtGames. Initially released in Taiwan in 2007, sales distribution of the portable console has since expanded to Europe and the United States as well. It was released in Russia as the Sega Gopher Wireless, bundled with FireJoy controllers, a set of wireless joysticks. It was also released in Brazil as the MD Play, by TecToy.

== Characteristics ==
- Processor: Motorola 68000, 7.8 MHz, 16 bit
- The amount of memory (ROM): 5MB
- The amount of memory (RAM): 64 KB
- Video memory capacity: 64 KB
- Display: LCD with high brightness technology Firecore, 2.8", 65000 colors. Resolution: 320x240 pixels.
- Sound: Speaker (mono)/earphones (mono)/processor generates stereo (Yamaha 2612 + PSG).
- Power supply: 3.7 V 350mAh Li-ion rechargeable battery (NP 60-2) / 220V USB adapter
- Battery life: 5 to 16 hours
- Dimensions: 149x62x19 mm
- SD card slot (max 8GB card capacity)
- Socket for connection to TV via AV cable
- IrDA port for connecting FireJoy wireless joysticks (Sega Gopher Wireless only)

== Other features ==
- The memory card used by the console must have strictly 9 pins and sizes up to 8GB. FAT or FAT32 file system, SD, SDHC, MiniSD (adapter), MicroSD (adapter), MicroSDHC (adapter) memory cards are supported, the console may not read a memory card with FAT file system.
- The USB adapter should not be included in the console if it is already connected to the TV. To do this, first, without turning off the console, remove the AV cable, turn on the charging and turn the AV cable back on. Otherwise, the charge burns.
- Switching between TV and Portable modes occurs once when the console is turned on and when the MENU button is pressed (image output is reinitialized). The mode cannot be changed in real time.
- In portable mode, the console operates at 60 Hz, like an NTSC Sega Genesis, whereas in TV mode, the console works at a frequency of 50 Hz, like an PAL Sega Mega Drive.
- The console does not support SaveRAM, and games such as Light Crusader or Mega Man: The Wily Wars will not work correctly.
- Most games work correctly, and have been fixed to work on the console.
- There is no Mode button in console management. In portable mode, it is always pressed, so some games using the 6-button control do not work correctly. The whole fault is the architecture of the console because some tracks are used simultaneously for different signals. When the wireless joysticks are connected, the Mode button will no longer be pressed. This problem has been to manually correct and add the button Mode.
- Processors in the console have different timings with the standard Sega Mega Drive and Sega Genesis. Namely, the main processor runs at a higher frequency, which affects some games in better performance, and the coprocessor at a lower frequency, which affects the worst sound quality and playback speed of audio samples.
- Image in different game modes can be stretched. This is due to the fact that in portable mode, the console responds to the program that the video uses the NTSC signal, but actually uses the PAL signal, in this connection, in portable mode, the picture with a resolution of 320x224 stretched to 320x240. In TV mode, this is not observed, as the console to make full use PAL. However, in games with a picture with a resolution of 256x224, it will be stretched horizontally to 320 in both modes.
- The sound is slightly understated by 4 semitones in the Yamaha 2612 and 7 semitones in the PSG. Also the DAC sound is a bit muffled and sounds in some games so quietly that it seems as if it is not at all.
- Standard sound in Sega Gopher is stereo, but due to the negligence of the manufacturer outputs are mixed, and as a result, only mono is present. This problem could be corrected manually.
- Due to different processor frequencies, some games that use interrupts to transfer music data to the coprocessor memory may hang or have a distorted or missing sound.
- There is a kind of console in black-and-black housing, where a set of built-in games, added the ability to adjust the backlight (4 brightness) and the ability to select a level in the built-in games of the first page, these settings will be saved in Serial EEPROM.
- There is a possibility to add images to custom games menu select the game from the SD card using the program MDB_Edit, or with a free analogue - ScreenGopher.
- If there are a large number of games on the map, having to scan them when turned on for the first time can be avoided. To do this, simply turn on the console and immediately press the menu button. However, this cannot be done if a new game has been downloaded or an old one has been deleted.
- The console menu uses full-color mode. Unlike the standard (9-bit), it transmits the entire 24-bit color spectrum.

== Pre-installed games ==
- Alex Kidd in the Enchanted Castle
- Alien Storm
- Altered Beast
- Arrow Flash
- Columns III
- Crack Down
- Decap Attack
- Dr. Robotnik's Mean Bean Machine
- Ecco the Dolphin
- Ecco Jr.
- ESWAT: City Under Siege
- Flicky
- Gain Ground
- Golden Axe
- Jewel Master
- Kid Chameleon
- Shadow Dancer: The Secret of Shinobi
- Shinobi III: Return of the Ninja Master
- Sonic & Knuckles
- Sonic Spinball

These games are included with the black-colored version of the console (there are also green, orange and blue that use standard included games):

- Alex Kidd in the Enchanted Castle
- Alien Storm
- Altered Beast
- Arrow Flash
- Bonanza Brothers
- Columns
- Comix Zone
- Crack Down
- Decap Attack
- Fatal Labyrinth
- Flicky
- Gain Ground
- Golden Axe
- Jewel Master
- Ristar
- Shadow Dancer: The Secret of Shinobi
- Streets of Rage
- Streets of Rage 2
- Sonic Spinball
- Vectorman
