= FHM (disambiguation) =

FHM was a British men's lifestyle magazine.

FHM could also refer to:

- Familial hemiplegic migraine, medical condition
- Folkhälsomyndigheten, Swedish government agency
- Forces de haute mer, in the World War II-era French Navy
- Franchise Hockey Manager, 2013 text-based video game
- Franciscan Handmaids of the Most Pure Heart of Mary, Black Catholic congregation of religious sisters
