= OOTP =

OOTP may refer to:

- Harry Potter and the Order of the Phoenix
- Harry Potter and the Order of the Phoenix (film)
- Harry Potter and the Order of the Phoenix (video game)
- Out of the Park Baseball
