= IGN =

American entertainment website

- Company type: Subsidiary
- Website type: Entertainment
- Available in: English, Arabic, French, German, Hungarian, Serbian, Swedish, Hebrew, Chinese, Dutch, Italian, Spanish, Danish, Finnish, Malay, Norwegian, Polish, Greek, Romanian, Korean, Croatian, Turkish, Czech, Portuguese, Japanese, Hindi
- Founded: September 29, 1996; 30 years ago (Note: As Imagine Games Network)
- Headquarters: San Francisco, California, United States
- Founder: Jonathan Simpson-Bint
- Key people: Peer Schneider (general manager)
- Industry: Video game and media journalism
- Employees: 250
- Parent: Imagine Media (before 2005); News Corporation (2005–2013); Ziff Davis (2013–present)
- Website: world.ign.com; ign.com
- IPv6 support: No
- Registration: Free; IGN Prime; Founder's Club
- Current status: Active

IGN (Note: Formerly an initialism for Imagine Games Network) is an American video gaming and entertainment media website operated by IGN Entertainment Inc., a subsidiary of Ziff Davis, Inc. Its headquarters is located in San Francisco's SoMa district and is headed by its former editor-in-chief, Peer Schneider. The IGN website was created by the media entrepreneur Chris Anderson and launched on September 29, 1996. IGN features articles on games, films, anime, television, comics, technology, and other media. Originally a network of desktop websites, IGN is also distributed on mobile platforms, console programs available on the Xbox and PlayStation, Nintendo Switch, PC, Mobile, FireTV, Roku, and via YouTube, Twitch, Hulu, and Snapchat.

Originally, IGN was the flagship website of IGN Entertainment, a website which owned and operated several other websites oriented towards players' interests, games, and entertainment, such as Rotten Tomatoes, GameSpy, GameStats, VE3D, TeamXbox, Vault Network, FilePlanet, and AskMen. IGN was sold to publishing company Ziff Davis in February 2013.

== History ==
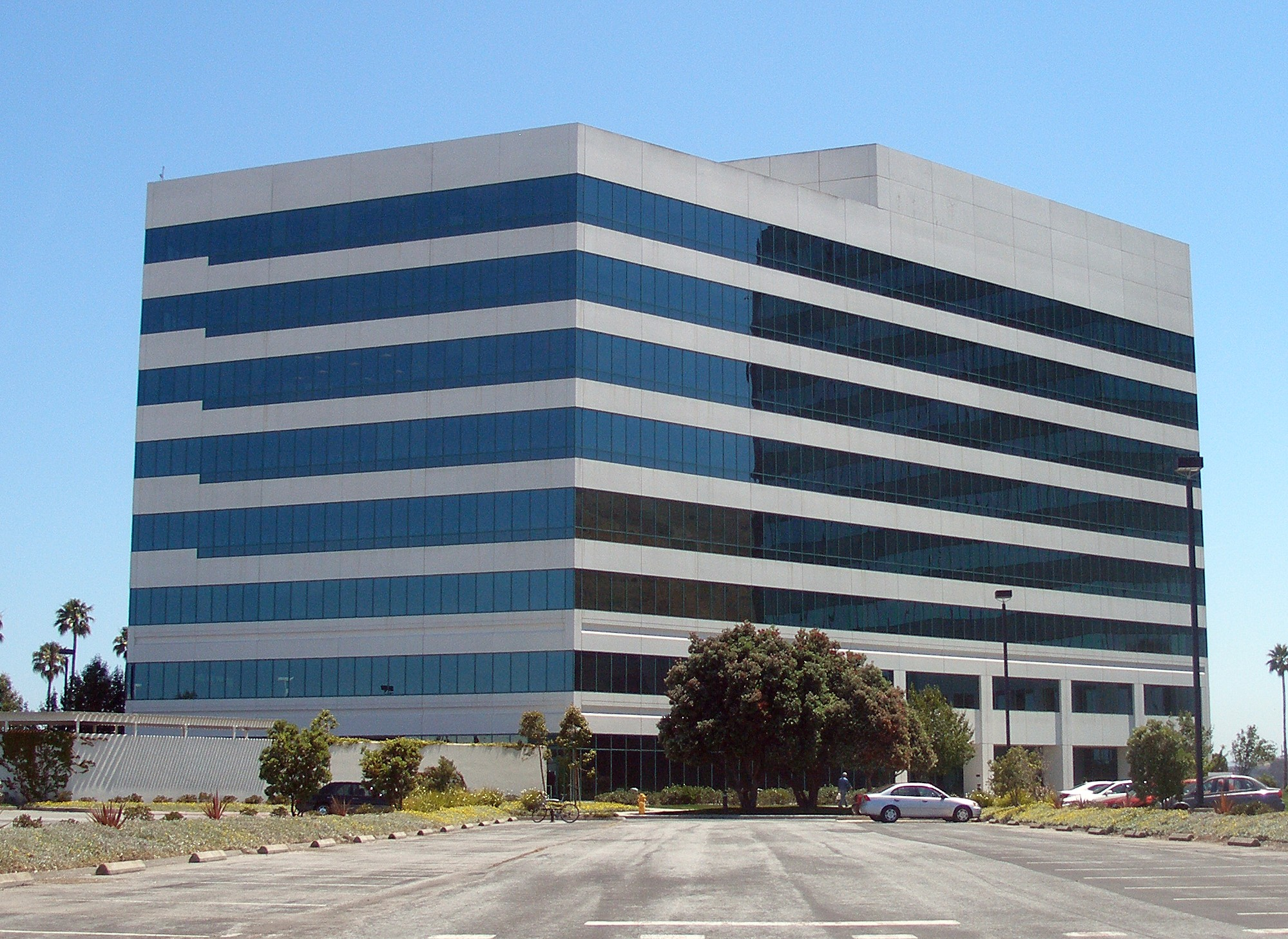
IGN Entertainment's former headquarters in Brisbane, California

IGN was created in September 1996 as the Imagine Games Network, the IGN content network was founded by publishing executive Jonathan Simpson-Bint and began as five individual websites within Imagine Media: N64.com (later renamed ign64.com), PSXPower, Saturnworld, Next-Generation.com and Ultra Game Players Online. Imagine expanded on its owned-and-operated websites by creating an affiliate network that included a number of independent fansites such as PSX Nation.com, Sega-Saturn.com, Game Sages, and GameFAQs. In 1998, the network launched a new homepage that consolidated the individual sites as system channels under the IGN brand. The homepage exposed content from more than 30 different channels. Websites Next-Generation and Ultra Game Players Online were not part of this consolidation; U.G.P.O. dissolved with the cancellation of the magazine, and Next-Generation was put "on hold" when Imagine decided to concentrate on launching the short-lived Daily Radar brand.

In February 1999, PC Magazine named IGN one of the hundred-best websites, alongside competitors GameSpot and CNET Gamecenter. That same month, Imagine Media incorporated a spin-off that included IGN and its affiliate channels as Affiliation Networks, while Simpson-Bint remained at the former company. In September, the newly spun-out standalone internet media company, changed its name to Snowball.com. At the same time, small entertainment website The Den merged into IGN and added non-gaming content to the growing network. Snowball held an IPO in 2000, but shed most of its other properties during the dot-com bubble. IGN prevailed with growing audience numbers and a newly established subscription service called IGN Insider (later IGN Prime), which led to the shedding of the name "Snowball" and adoption of IGN Entertainment on May 10, 2002.

In June 2005, IGN reported having 24,000,000 unique visitors per month, with 4.8 million registered users through all departments of the site. IGN has been ranked among the top 500 most-visited websites according to Alexa. In September 2005, IGN was acquired by Rupert Murdoch's multimedia business empire, News Corporation, for $650 million. IGN celebrated its 10th anniversary on January 12, 2008. IGN was headquartered in the Marina Point Parkway office park in Brisbane, California, until it relocated to a smaller office building near AT&T Park in San Francisco on March 29, 2010. On May 25, 2011, IGN sold its Direct2Drive division to Gamefly for an undisclosed amount.

=== Acquisition of UGO, sale to Ziff Davis ===
In 2011, IGN Entertainment acquired its rival UGO Entertainment (owners of 1Up.com) from Hearst Corporation. Ultimately, News Corp. planned to spin off IGN Entertainment as a publicly traded company, continuing a string of divestitures for digital properties it had previously acquired (including MySpace and Photobucket).

On February 4, 2013, after a failed attempt to spin off IGN as a separate company, News Corp. announced that it had sold IGN Entertainment to the publishing company Ziff Davis, which was recently acquired by J2 Global. Financial details regarding the purchase were not revealed. Prior to its acquisition by UGO, 1UP.com had previously been owned by Ziff Davis. Soon after the acquisition, IGN announced that it would be laying off staff and closing GameSpy, 1UP.com, and UGO in order to focus on its flagship brands, IGN and AskMen.

=== Subsidiaries and spin-offs ===
The role-playing video game interest website Vault Network was acquired by IGN in 1999. GameStats, a review aggregation website, was founded by IGN in 2004. GameStats includes a "GPM" (Game Popularity Metric) rating system which incorporates an average press score and average gamer score, as well as the number of page hits for the game. However, the site is no longer being updated. The Xbox interest site, TeamXbox, and the PC game website VE3D (Voodoo Extreme 3D) were acquired in 2003. IGN Entertainment merged with GameSpy Industries in 2005. The merger also brought the game download site FilePlanet into the IGN group; as of 2011 both FilePlanet and the GameSpy website still operate as video game-related web sites. IGN Entertainment acquired the online male lifestyle magazine AskMen in 2005. In 2004, IGN acquired film review aggregator Rotten Tomatoes and in 2010, sold the website to Flixster. In October 2017, Humble Bundle announced that it was being acquired by IGN.

IGN Entertainment acquired Gamer Network and its properties in May 2024 for an undisclosed sum. These included Eurogamer, Rock Paper Shotgun, VG247 and others. As a result, some layoffs were made due to redundancies.

=== Scoring systems ===
==== Original scale ====
A member of the IGN staff writes a review for a game and gives it a score between 0.1 and 10.0, which is assigned by increments of 0.1 and determines how much the game is recommended. The score is given according to the "individual aspects of a game, like presentation, graphics, sound, gameplay and lasting appeal". Each game is given a score in each of these categories, but the overall score for the game is an independent evaluation, not an average of the scores in each category.

==== 20-point scale ====
On August 3, 2010, IGN announced that the site would be changing to a new scoring scale. Instead of a 100-point scale, where games are scored in increments of 0.1, all future reviews would use a 20-point scale where games are scored in increments of 0.5. Under both systems, the maximum possible score a game can receive is 10.0. The scoring change was not retroactive: all scores on reviews written before the change would remain the same. This change also did not affect the scoring system for reader reviews.

==== 100-point scale ====
On September 13, 2012, IGN revealed that as part of its new review format all future reviews would follow a 100-point scale again, but without using decimals, meaning a score of 8.5 would become an 85. Unlike the previous conversion to the 20-point scale, this latest scoring system change was retroactive and all previous IGN review scores were to be updated to follow the new system. However, despite the announcement, the article included a short addition, post-release; it stated that after much discussion, they had decided to retain the decimal point in all upcoming scores.

==== Re-review policy ====
In early 2014, IGN introduced a new policy, in which a game's review score can be re-reviewed and improved, provided that continuous updates form a significant change compared to the game at launch. Examples of games that have been re-reviewed were Heroes of the Storm, League of Legends, Stardew Valley, Warframe, and the pocket edition of Minecraft.

==== 10-point scale ====
In January 2020, IGN revealed that reviews would be reverted to a 10-point scale, from 1 to 10, finding that the finer distinction of the 100-point scale was difficult to maintain, whereas a 10-point scale would still be true to its reviews and would be easier to promote.

== IGN 'Best of' awards ==
IGN's 'Best of' is an end-of-year event to annually honor the year's best games, films, television shows and comics. Winners of each award category are selected by IGN staff from a list of nominees, while readers are able to cast their own votes online to determine the 'People's Choice' award for each category.

== Other sections ==
In 2000, Snowball.com purchased an E-federation called the Internet Wrestling Organization (IWO). Since Snowball owned both IWO and IGN, IWO would go on to become IGN's first official E-Fed, even doing a column on the website. The IGN For Men section officially closed down on October 2, 2001, and is no longer updated. IGN has sites such as IGN Stars and AskMen.com that fulfil much of the function of the old IGN For Men site. IGN Wrestling met its end in early 2002 when many of the staff departed. Interviews with professional wrestling personalities and coverage of wrestling games have been folded into IGN Sports, headed by Jon Robinson. IGN Sci-Fi: Largely dead since 2002, this section of the site included movie news, comic book reviews, anime coverage and other associated items. It has since been discontinued.

In 2002, IGN launched a dedicated video game FAQs site specifically designed to host user-submitted guides. This was launched following the cancellation of affiliation with GameFAQs. In 2004, IGN launched GameStats, which was intended to be a more unbiased rating network, as it takes in scores from every corporate-owned game rating site and averages them all into one score to give a general idea of the quality of a game. IGN also launched Direct2Drive.com in 2004. Its primary focus is selling digital downloads of full PC and Mac video games, as well as anime, comics and game guides. In 2005, IGN launched its comics site, which is devoted to not just the staple Marvel and DC titles, but also manga, graphic novels, statues and toys.

In 2006, IGN launched its television site. It provides interviews with various television celebrities, in addition to a TV schedule, TV trivia and TV news. Like the film section, IGN's TV section has a variety of exclusive clips from upcoming television shows.

On May 30, 2006, IGN Dreamcast was restarted; however, none of the Dreamcast updates were posted on the main IGN webpage.

In 2007, IGN launched its anime site. It provided features on anime and manga, including trailers and free episodes. It also included reviews of manga and anime from other sections of IGN, such as IGN Comics and IGN DVD. The anime channel was dropped after IGN redesigned the site. In 2008, the IGN Retro channel was launched to mark IGN's 10th anniversary. To coincide with the release of Super Smash Bros. Brawl, IGN created the Super Smash Bros. World site. On the site, people can submit their user-created stages from the game and download ones made by other people. IGN subsequently launched a similar website called GTA 'Hood on April 29, 2008, for Grand Theft Auto IV.

Along with its popular website content, IGN also publishes many different podcasts on both its website and on iTunes. Some of its podcasts include console-oriented shows like the PlayStation-focused "Podcast Beyond" and the Xbox-oriented "Podcast Unlocked", the Nintendo-oriented "Nintendo Voice Chat", and Game Scoop!, a podcast where a variety of editors discuss news and topics surrounding the video game industry.

== Regional websites ==
IGN has 28 editions in 25 languages, as of 2021. The US & Canada, UK & Ireland, and Australia & New Zealand editions are operated by Ziff Davis subsidiaries, with all others being franchised publishers. Since 2006, IGN Entertainment began launching regional versions of the website for various countries and pan-regions. Initially, IGN began opening new offices outside the United States in order to support those regional websites, but later IGN began franchising its brand as a more cost-effective means of globalization, wherein it licensed various media publishers in many countries to use the IGN brand and manage regional websites on their own. Licensed regional publishers work on their own servers, albeit can link to IGN's HQ database, where they can import or translate articles, and use videos uploaded on IGN's servers that use IGN's own hosted video player.

When visiting www.ign.com from an IGN-supported region, the site automatically redirects visitors to their localized version using geolocation software, based on their countries' IP addresses. Each version of the site has a modified logo with their country's/region's respective flags near the IGN logo. However, it is still possible to access the original American website using a navigation bar above or below (depending on the regional website) the page's master template.

- In 2006, IGN opened its first offices in the UK and Australia, which both shared the same information as the American site but with added content authored from editors within each respective region.
- On May 16, 2012, in collaboration with Emirati-based company t-break Media, IGN Middle East was announced for the MENA gaming community. The site replaced t-break Media's own ME Gamers website, which was formerly one of the largest Middle Eastern-based gaming media outlets that was originally launched in 2006. ME Gamers' entire staff converted their duties to IGN Middle East, importing or translating many of IGN's English articles, whilst writing up their own articles, especially for Middle Eastern-specific events. IGN Middle East is available in both English and Arabic languages. While the site was initially launched to cover only video games, t-break Media announced in September 2012 that it would begin posting movie-related articles under the IGN brand as IGN Movies Middle East, merging most of the duties from its own ME Movies website, which was originally established in 2009, under a similar manner to its video game content. Unlike video games, however, most movie-related content will be in English only. IGN Middle East organized IGN Convention from 2013 to 2016.
- In September 2012 the Italian edition of IGN launched, managed by a local team, providing both original and translated contents.
- On October 9, 2012, in collaboration with the Spanish-based media company Marca, IGN Spain was announced. The site effectively replaces Marca's own Marca Player gaming news website. Marca Player's editors converted their duties to IGN Spain, translating many of IGN's English articles, whilst writing up their own Spanish articles as well, covering various topics including video games, movies, TV series and comics.
- In March 2013, IGN Russia was launched. The Russian version is managed by Gameland publishing house, and its staff was initially completed by former editors and writers from Strana Igr, Gameland's printed video game magazine that was closed later that year. IGN Russia was closed without prior notice by American owners in 2022 after Russian-Ukrainian war began on February 24, effectively wiping out years of work of local editors.
- On December 2, 2013, IGN Africa was launched.
- On December 17, 2013, in collaboration with Times Internet, IGN India was launched. The Indian edition takes AAA game reviews from its US counterpart and focuses more on coverage of gaming news and events in the country, apart from writing about comics, movies, technology. In November 2016, Fork Media Group partnered with Ziff Davis to operate IGN India. The Indian edition has since then expanded its coverage to pop culture and mainstream entertainment news and events in the country, as well as doing its own reviews for AAA games, TV series, anime and movies from both India and abroad.
- On September 1, 2014, IGN Latinoamérica was launched in collaboration with Publimetro and cover the whole Latin American region (except Brazil) with content in Spanish.
- On November 11, 2014, IGN Israel was launched.
- On January 30, 2015, IGN Hungary was launched.
- On February 23, 2015, IGN Brazil was launched.
- In June 2015, IGN Romania was launched.
- On November 6, 2015, IGN Poland was launched.
- On January 4, 2016, IGN Adria was launched. IGN Adria covers countries of ex-Yugoslavia region: Serbia, Croatia, Slovenia, Bosnia and Herzegovina, Montenegro and North Macedonia.
- On April 11, 2016, in collaboration with Sankei Digital, the online publishing arm of Japanese newspaper publisher Sankei Shimbun, IGN Japan was publicly launched, and was expected to have a full-scale release by summer 2016. The launch of IGN Japan is considered a critical development: In addition to translation of English articles, IGN Japan is hoping to also contribute much original content for other IGN editions from the Japanese end of the gaming industry, one of the world's largest video game markets with little mainstream journalism for Western media.
- On April 12, 2016, in collaboration with Pakistani-based Express Publications, IGN Pakistan was publicly launched. Pakistan originally shared some media coverage with IGN Middle East, and later IGN India, before spinning off to a completely independent IGN edition with focus on local gaming and pop culture events in Pakistan. IGN Pakistan is only available in English.
- In August 2018, IGN Korea was launched, covering South Korea.
- On August 7, 2019, Malaysian media giant Media Prima partnered with Ziff Davis to launch the Southeast Asian version of IGN for the Malaysian, Indonesian, Singaporean, Thai, Vietnamese and the Filipino markets
- In September 2020, IGN China was launched as an "editorially independent" outlet of Tencent.

== IGN Con ==
IGN Convention (IGN Con) is a video games, movies, comics and pop culture convention held in various cities in the Middle East. The event generally includes celebrities, video game tournaments, table top games, card games, movie previews, comic book stalls and a cosplay competition. A number of Middle Eastern artists and game developers also showcase their work at IGN Convention. This convention is owned and operated by IGN Middle East, the Middle Eastern edition of IGN.

IGN Convention is the spiritual successor to GameFest, a biannual, smaller scale gaming gallery which was originally hosted by IGN Middle East's parent company T-break Media between 2010 and 2012, before the hosting duties were subsequently taken over by AMD EMEA. The IGN Convention logo was designed by prominent Gulf based artist Ashraf Ghori.

== IGN Pro League ==
In 2011, IGN launched IGN Pro League, a professional esports circuit that ran tournaments for StarCraft II: Wings of Liberty, ShootMania Storm and League of Legends. On March 6, 2013, only weeks prior to the event, IGN abruptly canceled the finals of IPL 6—which were to be held in Las Vegas from March 28 through 31, and discontinued the league. IGN indicated that it was no longer in a position to commit to compete with the increasing number of esports events that were being held. On April 8, 2013, Blizzard Entertainment announced that it had acquired the staff and assets of the IPL from IGN; its former staff were reassigned to work on in-house esports productions.

== Controversies ==
=== Journalistic misconduct accusation ===
In 2007, Video Game Media Watch accused former IGN editor Doug Perry of "journalistic misconduct" for an exclusive review of Prey.

=== Sexual harassment accusations ===
In November 2017, some IGN employees refused to work to show solidarity with Kallie Plagge, a former editor who alleged that in 2016, another editor, Vince Ingenito, sexually harassed her and another female employee and made inappropriate comments. Human resources allegedly told her that she "needed to have better judgment about who [she] was 'friends' with" and that she was an "equal participant" in "inappropriate flirtation". This incident was widely circulated across social media.

=== Plagiarism ===
In August 2018, the owner of YouTube channel Boomstick Gaming accused the IGN reviewer Filip Miucin of plagiarizing his video review of the game Dead Cells. On August 7, IGN stated that it had found "substantial similarities" between the reviews, apologized, and announced that it had dismissed Miucin. On August 10, IGN published a new review by Brandin Tyrrel, which included an editor's note apologizing again and stating that "this review (and its score) represents solely the opinion of the new reviewer".

In a subsequently unlisted video, Miucin responded that while he took "complete ownership over what happened", the similarity was not intentional. Kotaku found similarities between Miucin's other reviews, reviews on Nintendo Life and Engadget and material posted on the games discussion forum NeoGAF. On August 14, IGN announced that it would remove all of Miucin's work pending further review. On April 19, 2019, Miucin admitted plagiarism and issued an apology on his YouTube channel.

=== Article supporting Palestinian aid ===
During the 2021 Israel–Palestine crisis, the main IGN site posted an article on May 14 urging readers to donate to charities helping Palestinian civilians such as the Palestine Children's Relief Fund and linked to relevant news reporting. A Palestinian flag was also added besides the IGN logo. Shortly after the article went up IGN Israel made statements on social media condemning the article. The Palestinian flag was soon replaced with a Red Cross. On May 16, the article was deleted and a statement was made on the IGN Twitter account saying that it was wrong to only highlight one side of the conflict. A reposted version on South Africa-based IGN Africa was also removed. On May 17, over 60 members of IGN's staff signed an open letter condemning the article's removal for going against the site's editorial freedom and policies for retracting or correcting articles, as well as the lack of communication with IGN staff. IGN reinstated the article on August 24 under a new headline alongside a statement of newly formalized editorial policies.

== Television and films ==
- Gamer Nation (2003)
- Bill Fillmaff's Secret System (2006 video)
- Game Scoop! (2006– )
- IGN Originals (2008– )
- IGN Daily Fix (2009– )
- Up at Noon (2012–2021)
- Cheap Cool Crazy (2012–2013)
- IGN Presents (2012– )
- Castlevania: Hymn of Blood (2012)
- IGN Live (2012– )
- Project: SERA (2013– )
- Not Another Zombie Apocalypse (2013)
- Dave Gorman: Modern Life Is Goodish: Badgers Don't Vote (2013)
- Assassin's Creed 4: Making Black Flag (2013)
- 9 Reasons We're Excited for Destiny (2013 video)
- Optimus Prime in Titanfall (2014 video)
- Making Assassin's Creed Unity: A New Beginning (2014)
- Fast to the Future (2015 video)
- Star Wars on Netflix (2016 video)
- IGN Access NYCC Cosplay (2016–2017)
- The 20th Annual D.I.C.E. Awards (2017 TV special)
- IGN Now (2019– )
- Devs React to Speedruns (2019– )
