= AtGames Legends Ultimate =

Home arcade cabinet

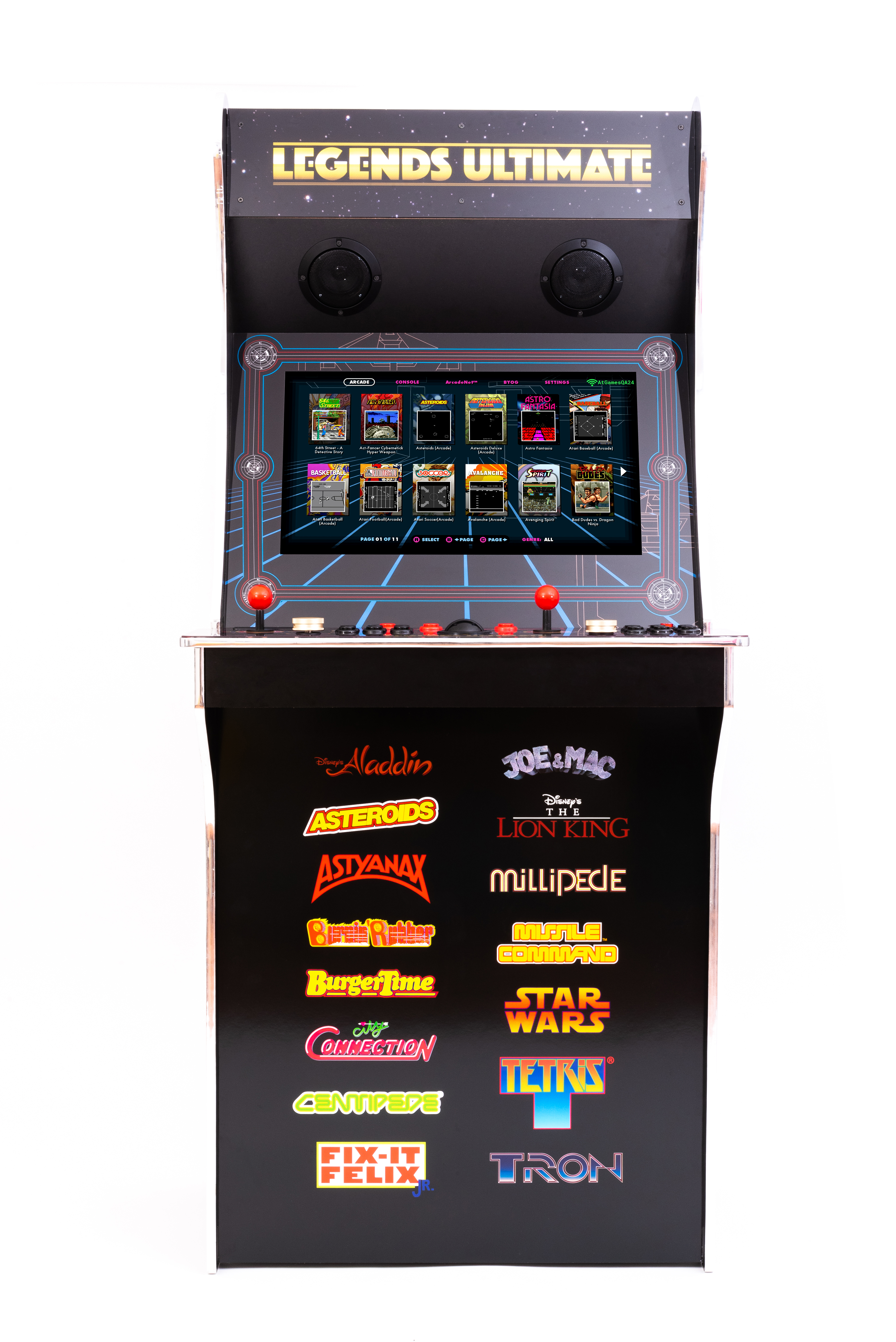
- Manufacturer: AtGames
- Type: Arcade cabinet
- Released: November 2019

The AtGames Legends Ultimate is a home arcade cabinet created by AtGames to be used for retrogaming, and first released in November 2019. It is capable of emulating more than 350 individual games and includes Internet connectivity to download new licensed titles. It was positively received by critics for its hardware and comparatively low price point for a full-sized arcade cabinet. Its small default selection of quality games was noted as a major flaw, although users can add games manually in the form of ROMs.

== Specifications ==
The arcade cabinet is sold in two sizes, a 46-inch, US$399 compact model and a 66-inch, US$599 full-sized model. The chassis is made from heavy MDF. It has a 24-inch, 1080p resolution flat-panel display, as well as a pair of joysticks with six buttons for each, two spinners, and a trackball. It also has navigation buttons, as well as a pair of both HDMI and USB ports. It is Bluetooth-capable to support various peripherals.

The system comes preloaded with arcade games, with the majority being from the libraries of Data East and Jaleco. It also has subscription-based ArcadeNet functionality, allowing more games to be played from a cloud server, and a "BYOG" (Bring Your Own Game) feature in which it can connect to a gaming PC via Bluetooth and stream games. Games can also be added manually by converting ROMs into a format the machine understands.

== Reception ==
K. Thor Jensen of PCMag rated the arcade cabinet 3.5/5 points. Saying that it "hits the sweet spot between price and performance", he praised it as a "quality starter for any home arcade". However, he criticized the responsiveness of the joysticks, which use four-way gates that do not allow for smooth diagonal movement, albeit noting that they were easily replaceable. He also called most of the bundled games "forgettable at best", though saying it had potential.

Kevin Lee of IGN called it a "pretty well-rounded unit". Chris Shive of Hardcore Gamer stated it was "probably the most bang for your buck as far as home arcade cabinets are concerned", praising its large size, but called the included games "not [...] AAA caliber".
