= EWD =

EWD may refer to:

== Gaming ==
- Extreme Warfare Deluxe, a text-based wrestling-themed computer game

== Science and technology ==
- Edsger W. Dijkstra (1930–2002), Dutch systems and computer scientist
  - EWDs, his manuscripts
- Electric window defogger, on vehicular rear windows
- Electrical wiring diagram
- Electrowetting display, a form of electronic paper

== Rail transport ==
- Earlswood railway station (West Midlands), in England
- Eastwood railway station, in Sydney, Australia
