= Grey Dog Software =

American computer Games developer

Grey Dog Software is a computer games development company, based in Phoenix, Arizona, and specializing in sports text simulations. Notable games released by Grey Dog include the Total Extreme Wrestling series and the Wrestling Spirit series.

== History ==
On September 7, 2004, Arlie Rahn founded Grey Dog. Gary Gorski and Adam Ryland came to the company with Rahn.

All three developers had worked under the same company, .400 Software Studios, but when that company dissolved due to an ownership dispute, the three developers formed Grey Dog Software under the ownership of Rahn.

Gorski left Grey Dog in May 2006 to create his own company, Wolverine Studios.

Brian Nichols joined the company in December 2006 in order to be the lead developer of the basketball product line.

== Games Released ==
- Arcadia: Guild of Heroes
- Bowl Bound College Football
- Comic Book Hero: The Greatest Cape
- Comic Book Universe
- Fast Break College Basketball
- Fast Break Pro Basketball
- Fast Break Pro Basketball 2
- Fast Break Pro Basketball 2013
- Imperium: Arena of Death
- Total Extreme Wrestling 2005
- Total Extreme Wrestling 2007
- Total Extreme Wrestling 2008
- Total Extreme Wrestling 2010
- Total Extreme Wrestling 2013
- Total Extreme Wrestling 2016
- Total Extreme Wrestling 2020
- Total Extreme Wrestling IX
- World of Mixed Martial Arts
- World of Mixed Martial Arts 2
- World of Mixed Martial Arts 3
- World of Mixed Martial Arts 4
- World of Mixed Martial Arts 5
- World of Mixed Martial Arts 6
- Wrestling Spirit
- Wrestling Spirit 2
- Wrestling Spirit 3

== Developers ==
Products are categorized into product lines: basketball, football, wrestling/MMA and other.

Developers
Basketball	Brian Nichols
Football	Arlie Rahn
Wrestling/MMA/Other	Adam Ryland
