= Direct2Drive =

Video game digital distribution service

- Website type: Online retailer
- Owner: AtGames
- Website: direct2drive.com
- Commercial: Yes
- Registration: Yes
- Launched: May 28, 2004; 22 years ago
- Current status: Active

Direct2Drive (D2D) is an online game store offering PC games via direct download.

== History ==
Launched in 2004, IGN reported "exponential growth in sales" since that time. It offered over 3,000 titles through relationships with more than 300 game publishers. Direct2Drive sponsored a $10,000 award at the Independent Games Festival called the D2D Vision Award, which "celebrated independent developers exemplifying innovation in design coupled with excellence in game-play". In 2009, the site made headlines by refusing to sell Activision's Call of Duty: Modern Warfare 2 due to that game's integration with Valve's Steamworks service. Users buying Modern Warfare 2 from a reseller such as Direct2Drive would be forced to also download and install the Steam client.

In May 2011, GameFly acquired Direct2Drive from IGN Entertainment, Inc. and renamed the service to GameFly Digital. In October 2014, GameFly released a statement in their website indicating that it had sold the digital download service to AtGames Holding Ltd., and that the transition would be completed by the end of the year.

AtGames Digital Media relaunched the digital storefront Direct2Drive in November 2014 under the original name of Direct2Drive.
