= Shacknews =

Video game website

- Website type: Gaming
- Creators: Steve Gibson; Maarten Goldstein
- Parent: Gamerhub
- Website: shacknews.com
- Commercial: Yes
- Launched: 1996; 30 years ago

Shacknews is an American video game journalism website founded in 1996 that publishes news articles, reviews, and cheat codes.

== History ==
Shacknews was founded in 1996 by Steve Gibson. The website, originally named 'Quakeholio', was dedicated to the then-upcoming id Software game Quake. FileShack, a spinoff-site for game demos, patches, videos, and miscellaneous game-related assets for Shacknews users and others, was launched in August 2002.

On February 3, 2009, Shacknews and all related Shacknews destinations were purchased by GameFly. Asif Khan, a financial analyst, contributed to purchasing the site from Gamefly near the end of 2013 and became the site's CEO. The sister site FileShack was shut down in 2014.

== Reception ==
In August 2004, Maximum PC magazine featured Shacknews in its list of "11 Websites That Every Geek Should Bookmark". Then, in November 2007, PC Magazine recognized Shacknews in its "Top 100 Undiscovered Web Sites" list. In 2018, Shacknews raised over $100,000 in the Extra Life 24-Hour Gaming Marathon for the Children's Specialized Hospital Foundation. David L. Craddock, a long-form videogame journalism writer of Shacknews published several books on Diablo, Shovel Knight, Pillars of Eternity and Quake and credited Khan with publishing his findings.
