= Total Extreme Wrestling =

Series of professional wrestling management text simulators

Total Extreme Wrestling (TEW) is a series of professional wrestling management text simulators created by British programmer Adam Ryland for the PC since 1995. The series started with Extreme Warfare in 1995, with the latest edition in the series being Total Extreme Wrestling IX, which was released in August 2024.

== Games in the series ==
=== Classic Extreme Warfare ===
Adam Ryland originally developed Extreme Warfare as a collectible card game with a wrestling theme. Due to complexity and set up time it was decided a computer format would be more suitable. The first Extreme Warfare on the PC (now called Extreme Warfare 1) was programmed in 1995 in QBasic. This game was a simple simulator, where one could decide what matches were to take place and who was going to win them but also involved some simple financial elements, such as the wages of wrestlers. Due to limitations in QBasic, Ryland moved the series over to Turbo Pascal where further incarnations of the game were created, including: Extreme Warfare 2, Extreme Warfare 2000, Extreme Warfare 2001, Extreme Warfare 2002, Extreme Warfare 5000, Extreme Warfare 6000, Extreme Warfare 7500, and Extreme Warfare 9000.

Each version of the game was an upgrade of the previous and continually built on the ideas of booking matches and running the business side of a professional wrestling promotion. After release of EW 9000, a game called Promotion Wars was released by fellow British programmer Adam Jennings, taking some inspiration from both Extreme Warfare 9000 and Championship Manager. After the game's release, some of Extreme Warfare's fan base shifted their interest over to this game when released in October 2000.

=== Extreme Warfare Deluxe ===
On April 1, 2001, Extreme Warfare Deluxe (EWD) was released. It was the first game in a while to be built by scratch instead of an upgrade of the previous games.

EWD expanded on the previous games in terms of the actual game world. The game world was expanded in that everyone in the database can now be hired by any promotion, unlike previous games in which WWF superstars can only be hired by the WWF, with the same applying for WCW and ECW. This helped to bring more competition between promotions, which now had their own artificial intelligence. Also included in EWD was the match report screen which featured stats about the match quality, crowd reaction and worker effort of the match along with an overall rating. This setup would end up being the basis of all match report screens in later games in the series up to and including TEW 2004.

Initially, Ryland stated that Deluxe was going to be the final game of the series but shortly afterwards, he changed his mind and began work on a new Extreme Warfare game. With the limitations of Turbo Pascal now pushing the game to the limit, Ryland decided in October 2001 to start work on a brand new game in the EW series.

=== Extreme Warfare Revenge ===
Extreme Warfare Revenge (EWR) was released on June 15, 2002. Now programmed in Visual Basic, the series now took a Windows style interface. One of the most significant changes this game took to the series was that everything on a wrestling event is under the control of the user. In previous games in the series, angles, finishes and (in EWD) interviews were randomly created. This also coincided with the new feud system that was to count the matches, angles and interview victories between the workers involved. The match reports also took a slight change, featuring reviews of the matches from such Internet columnists as Scott Keith instead of a straight play-by-play style. However, the report style would revert to its old style in TEW 2004.

Another major feature that changed the way the game was played was the way the game world was represented. Unlike the previous games in which it was mostly focused on the major promotions such as the WWF, WCW, and ECW the promotion size feature meant many promotions in North America could now be included from the global sized promotions like WWE to the cult sized promotions like ROH to a mere backyard federation.

From June 2002 to July 2003, the game has had some significant upgrades and new versions of the game were released. Some of these changes included changes to the TV timeslot system where the more further away from a prime time slot a televised event is shown, the fewer segments the user gets to book with. The Internet feature was also increased to include a website based on the independent promotions, a website based on backstage gossip and a website for your promotion. Relationships between workers were added to help bring in backstage politics where people are more willing put over their friends and less with their enemies. Eventually workers could also be in multiple tag teams with a statistic for experience which increases with each match fought together. Gimmicks were then added for wrestlers to use which would affect the overness of a worker over how strong that gimmick was. More changes were made to adapt to the independent promotions. This included multiple open contracts for workers, enabling them to work in up to three promotions and the ability of workers to go on Japanese tours, affecting the booking of cards. The optional ability of viewing a wrestler's picture was also added later in the game's production.

Due to the size of the game, Ryland felt that in order to include new features and upgrades a completely new game would have to be programmed from scratch. With this task taking quite a lot of his time, Ryland decided to turn his hobby into a commercial venture, signing a contract with simulator game company .400 Software Studios to produce a new commercial game.

=== Total Extreme Warfare 2004 ===
Total Extreme Warfare 2004 (TEW 2004) was released on March 31, 2004, under .400 Software Studios. The game was distributed by downloading on the Internet after purchase, (using ELicense). A full working trial was also available for download which originally would expire after a single day but was replaced by a trial that makes the user able to play one game month unlimited times.

Along with a new professional layout, the game had more features. While the previous games only focused on the wrestling scene of North America (Japan was featured in later versions of EWR but not playable), TEW 2004 expanded the world to include such areas as Japan, Mexico, the United Kingdom and Australia. With this, each worker's overness was now expanded from EWR's single value to a series of values depending on areas in the world. The AI was changed in that now the user could now see what matches other promotions have booked, other promotions' financial details and what deals they have made. More contract clauses such as medical coverage and travel expenditure being included, contracts deal decisions were now made over time rather than immediate. Inspired by some fans playing against each other using WWE brands by sending files to each other through the Internet, a multi-player feature was added to make users play against each other with different promotions. Booking was also improved in that not only could the user edit the card more easily, the booking was now time-based, meaning such anomalies as booking 11-hour-long Iron Man matches on a two-hour shows would no longer be possible. The game was also more customisable than before with new editing modes as Create-A-Match and Create-A-Gimmick.

Due to the problem of copyright issues by going commercial, the series turned from using stats of the real wrestling world to a fictitious wrestling world called the CornellVerse. This world is named after the character of Tommy Cornell, one of the most influential people and best wrestlers in the CornellVerse, based on a character Ryland had created a few years earlier while participating in e-federations.

On June 14, 2004, the game was renamed Total Extreme Wrestling 2004 to help distinguish the new TEW series from the earlier EWR series.

Due to undisclosed reasons, Ryland moved from .400 Software Studios to another simulator game company, Grey Dog Software. His first game created there however was not another Extreme Warfare game, instead the first Wrestling Spirit game.

Due to .400 Software Studio's closure on January 1, 2006, the game was taken off the market permanently. There are currently no plans to make this game freeware or shareware.

=== Total Extreme Wrestling 2005 ===
The sequel to TEW 2004, Total Extreme Wrestling 2005 (TEW 2005) was released on October 6, 2005, under Grey Dog Software. A demo was also released in advance on September 29, 2005, allowing the user to play one game month just like previous demos. TEW 2005 included some more new features. Advance booking was one example which helped to promote upcoming big events. Televised shows also improved, bringing both competition to the shows with non-wrestling shows along with multiple television deals around the world for one show. The pay-per-view feature was now very similar to television in that there's now a list of pay-per-view providers which the user must make a deal with to get their pay-per-view provided. A momentum meter was also added to the wrestlers to bring in more realism in that if they give great matches, cut good interviews and participate in angles, it will increase and thus gain more overness. This helped to prevent the user from booking the same over people all the time and expect good ratings. The booking also improved in that the match purpose feature from EWR has returned and enhanced. The user must now talk to road agents about how the match has to be set up, including ways of putting people over, burying a worker and the way an actual match needs to be performed. TEW 2005 also made more features customizable with its new editable statistics for angles, storylines, locations and injuries. Its angle editor consisted of many different types such as interviews to beatdowns to celebrations and uses up to six people to participate in various roles. The storyline editor takes these angles and places them in an order the booker will need to comply to. The storyline editor was created by Phil Parent, using Georges Polti's book The Thirty-Six Dramatic Situations as an inspiration. Also included was the "grades" feature. Instead of having an exact view of the stats each wrestler has along with changes, a more realistic grade feature was instead added to make the user rely on instinct for crucial decisions.

TEW 2005 became freeware on July 1, 2009.

=== Total Extreme Wrestling 2007 ===
Total Extreme Wrestling 2007 (TEW 2007) was officially released on December 29, 2006, with a number of new features. Whereas both TEW2004 and TEW2005 were written from scratch, TEW 2007 was being built on top of TEW 2005's source code. There were many new features, such as the ability to customise merchandise and a large amount of new contract types (short-term, etc.).

=== Total Extreme Wrestling 2008 ===
A new installment of the series, Total Extreme Wrestling 2008 (TEW 2008), was announced on the Grey Dog Software website on January 1, 2008. The game is largely based on TEW 2007, but Ryland made more than 100 changes and additions. The game allows players to import and convert their TEW 2007 databases. The game was released on June 7, 2008. The demo for the game was released on June 1, 2008.

=== Total Extreme Wrestling 2010 ===
In late 2009, it was announced that Total Extreme Wrestling 2010 (TEW 2010) would be released in early 2010. Some of the new features announced included a revamp of backstage morale, and several changes to improve the interface and to reduce the amount of time it takes to navigate through the game and to book a show.

On January 20, 2010, Adam Ryland released the demo to Total Extreme Wrestling 2010. The official release happened on January 25, 2010.

=== Total Extreme Wrestling 2013 ===
At the end of July, it was announced that Total Extreme Wrestling 2013 (TEW 2013) would be released in December 2012. Some of the new features announced included an Autobooker, Fog Of War, Tribute Shows, Shoot Interviews, Legacies, and several other changes to help either make the game more realistic, and opened up more options in the database

Total Extreme Wrestling 2013 was released on December 16, 2012, with the demo version available on December 9.

=== Total Extreme Wrestling 2016 ===
On January 8, 2016, it was announced that Total Extreme Wrestling 2016 (TEW 2016) was in development. The developer's journal announced that the game would feature elements that would add more realism and would also include things such as backstage cliques. On April 1, 2016, the last day of developer's journal updates, TEW 2016 was announced to have a demo release date of April 25, with a full release on May 2. While in previous versions of the demo, the player could only play through January of the game's titular year, it was announced that TEW 2016's demo would allow players to play through both January and February of any year.

=== Total Extreme Wrestling 2020 ===
On December 8, 2018, it was announced that Total Extreme Wrestling 2020 (TEW 2020) is in development with an estimate release of April 2020. The announcement stated that Ryland had completely rewritten the code before reinserting older features to make the game "effectively a much sharper, quicker, more intuitive, better quality piece of work" and promised that TEW 2020 would be "the biggest jump forward in terms of quality the series has ever seen".

The developer's journal, beginning on the day of the announcement, was split into multiple phases, the first phase being announcements of new and returning features which had already been added beginning December 10, 2018, and ending July 12, 2019, while the second phase, which began July 29, 2019, and is currently ongoing, is a "live" journal discussing features currently being worked on and the current level of completion of the default game world, "The Cornellverse". Some of the highly-requested features added include playing as a company's developmental territory and giving the player more control over house shows.

Another feature introduced was that of attributes, replacing the old "personality" and "lifestyle" systems. In an interview with My Games Lounge, Ryland said that "it was nice to do a spring clean of the code" as re-writing the code is what allowed him to add so many new features.

On March 28, 2020, the release date of TEW 2020 was announced as April 23 for the trial version, and April 30 for the full retail version. On April 25, the game's release date was pushed back to May 14.

=== Total Extreme Wrestling IX ===
On July 1, 2024, Adam Ryland announced that Grey Dog Software would be releasing TEW IX in August of 2024.
