= Front Office Football =

- Developer: Solecismic Software
- Publisher: Solecismic Software
- Platform: Microsoft Windows
- Release: 1998
- Genre: Sports (American football)

Front Office Football is a series of sports management games where the player directs an NFL football team. It was designed by Jim Gindin, as part of his one-man company, Solecismic Software, founded in Redmond, Washington on February 20, 1998.

== Series ==
It has had seven sequels: Front Office Football 2, Front Office Football 2001, Front Office Football 2002, Front Office Football 4, Front Office Football 2004, Front Office Football 2007, Front Office Football 7, and Front Office Football 8. A college football version titled Front Office Football: The College Years was released in 2001. Having received many favorable reviews over the years, it has been called the most realistic American football simulation for the computer.

Front Office Football 2004 was the first version that allowed for multi-player capability, resulting in the creation of several on-line leagues.

Front Office Football 8 was released on November 23, 2016.

In 2018, Gindin announced after years without a publisher following being dropped by EA Sports, he had joined forces with Out of the Park Developments.

On June 11, 2020, it was announced that Solecismic Software and OOTP Developments were parting ways. Full ownership of the FOF9 code was given to Gindin to develop the next version of Front Office Football, which Gindin released on Steam on October 31, 2023.

== Gameplay ==
The series revolves around the player managing an American Football team. The player plays the role of the general manager, and is tasked with leading the controlled team to success. The main goal of the games in the series is to win the Front Office Bowl, which is supposed to represent the Super Bowl. Excluding Front Office Football: The College Years, all of the games mirror the NFL. The series does not include any other football leagues.

The player is also tasked with managing the team's finances. The player can manage the contracts of the team and staff and control the ticket prices. If the team doesn't make a profit, the player can be in danger of being fired.

The series also allows the player to be a coach, by creating game plans and calling plays.

=== Presentation ===
Unlike other sports games, such as EA's Madden NFL, the series does not feature sophisticated graphics. Instead, the games are mostly text-based. The in-game matches are represented through a scoreboard. The game does not feature any music or sound effects.

=== Features ===
- A realistic trading system that allows the user to trade with other teams.
- An aging system that dictates how long players' careers last, depending on their positions.
- A draft system where users can select college players to build their team.
- A system where users can track statistics from many different categories. Players can sort by different categories.
- A play calling system where users can select plays during games and strategize.
- A Free agency system where users can sign free agents. Each player has their own preferences on their loyalty and desire to play for a championship team.
- Nearly 10,000 American cities that players can be from. Their hometowns can have an influence on their free agency decisions.
- Depth Charts where users can control the personnel of their team.
- A film room where users can view breakdowns of every game.
- A player rating system that rates players in 53 different skills. Instead of showing the true ratings of players, the users see the ratings through the eyes of their coaching staff.
- A salary cap that users have to take into consideration when building their teams.
- A system that allows users to relocate teams to other cities and build new stadiums. Each city has its own economic rating.
- Team chemistry that affects players based on how they feel about other players on the team.
- History and statistics on every player that has played and been drafted in the league.
- A power rating system that ranks teams based on Solecismic Software's custom power rankings.
- Multiplayer League support that allows up to 32 users to compete in a league.
- A system that allows quarterbacks to have access to more plays as they learn more about the game.

=== Features added in Front Office Football Eight ===
- A system that allows users to create an offensive playbook consisting of up to 200 plays. The user has the option to let the AI create a playbook for them.
- Charts that allow the user to select starters based on personnel.
- A system that allows users to write scripts for plays for every situation.
- Instant history generation that generates up to 50 seasons of history for the user's league.
- Enhanced Multiplayer: increased security and shortened load times.
- Player cards that allow quick access to all information about a player.
- Graphs that highlight potential dynasties.
- Playoff probability simulator that allows the user to see any team's chances to make the playoffs.
- New Menu Interface.
- The ability to take advantage of multiple monitors.
- A system that highlights any quarterback controversies taking place in the league.
- Quote of the day.

== Reception ==
=== Awards ===
- The editors of Computer Games Magazine nominated Front Office Football: The College Years as the best sports game of 2001, but ultimately gave the award to High Heat Baseball 2002.
- Original game nominated for Computer Gaming World's Sports Game of the Year, 1999 Premier Awards.
- Original game received Editors' Choice Award, 4 1/2-Star Review, Computer Gaming World, January 1999 issue.
- EA SPORTS Front Office Football (FOF2) received Editors' Choice Award, 4 1/2-Star Review, Computer Gaming World, January 2000 issue.
- Front Office Football 2001 received Editors' Choice Award, 4 1/2-Star Review, Computer Gaming World, March 2001 issue.
- Original game named Winner, Strategy Category, Ziff-Davis Shareware Awards
- Original game nominated for Sports Game of the Year, (CNet) Gamecenter Awards for 1998.

=== Criticism ===
Games in the series have been referred to as a better alternative than Madden when it comes to managing a team.

A common criticism is that the games are lacking when it comes to graphics.
