= Out of the Park Developments =

German sports-management video game developer

Out of the Park Developments GmbH & Co.KG
- Industry: Video games, Sports management game
- Founded: 1999; 27 years ago
- Founders: Markus Heinsohn, Andreas Raht
- Headquarters: Berlin, Germany
- Key people: Markus Heinsohn, Andreas Raht
- Products: Out of the Park Baseball, Franchise Hockey Manager
- Website: ootpdevelopments.com

Out of the Park Developments GmbH & Co.KG is a German video game developer based in Berlin. Founded by Markus Heinsohn and Andreas Raht in 1999, the studio specialises in text sim-style sports games, and has produced notable franchises, such as Out of the Park Baseball and Franchise Hockey Manager.

== History ==
Out of the Park Developments was founded in 1999, by current managing directors Markus Heinsohn and Andreas Raht.

On 21 December 2016, Out of the Park Developments announced that they had received Metacritic's 2016 PC Game of the Year Award for Out of the Park Baseball 17.

On October 12, 2020, Com2uS acquired a 100% stake in Out of the Park Developments.

On November 29, 2024, Heinsohn announced on the company forum that Out of the Park Baseball 25 would be his final launch as a developer as he sought new career opportunities.

== Games developed ==
Year	Title
1999	Out of the Park Baseball
2001	Out of the Park 2
2002	Out of the Park 4
2003	Out of the Park 5
2004	Out of the Park 6.5
2005	Out of the Park Baseball 2006
2006	Out of the Park Baseball 2007
2007	Out of the Park Baseball 2008
2008	Out of the Park Baseball 2009
2009	Out of the Park Baseball 10
2010	Out of the Park Baseball 11
2011	Out of the Park Baseball 12
2012	Out of the Park Baseball 13
2013	Out of the Park Baseball 14; Franchise Hockey Manager 2014
2014	Out of the Park Baseball 15; Franchise Hockey Manager 2015
2015	Out of the Park Baseball 16; Franchise Hockey Manager 2
2016	Out of the Park Baseball 17; MLB Manager 2016; Franchise Hockey Manager 3
2017	Out of the Park Baseball 18; MLB Manager 2017; Franchise Hockey Manager 4
2018	Out of the Park Baseball 19; MLB Manager 2018; Franchise Hockey Manager 5
2019	Out of the Park Baseball 20; Franchise Hockey Manager 6
2020	Out of the Park Baseball 21; Franchise Hockey Manager 7
2021	Out of the Park Baseball 22; OOTP Baseball Go!; Franchise Hockey Manager 8
2022	Out of the Park Baseball 23; OOTP Baseball Go!; Franchise Hockey Manager 9
2023	Out of the Park Baseball 24; OOTP Baseball Go!; Franchise Hockey Manager 10
2024	Out of the Park Baseball 25; OOTP Baseball Go!; Franchise Hockey Manager 11
2025	Out of the Park Baseball 26; OOTP Baseball Go!; Franchise Hockey Manager 12
2026	Out of the Park Baseball 27; OOTP Baseball Go!; Franchise Hockey Manager 13
