= Hollywood Mogul =

1993 video game

- Developer: Carey DeVuono
- Publisher: Hollywood Mogul Company
- Platforms: MS-DOS, Windows
- Release: 1993: MS-DOS; 1997: Windows
- Genre: Business Simulation
- Mode: Single-player

Hollywood Mogul is a video game for MS-DOS published in 1993. It was designed and published by Carey DeVuono as the Hollywood Mogul Company. The game is an economic simulation of a movie studio. Players choose movie plots to use for a movie, set production budgets and select the talent. Goal is to create movies which make money. Players juggle the added concerns of movie budgets, cost over-runs, and irritable actors and directors in order to succeed.

The original version was written in Visual Basic. A Microsoft Windows version was released in 1997. A sequel, Hollywood Mogul 3, was released in late 2006.

== Gameplay ==
Hollywood Mogul has five difficulty levels to choose from, each with higher annual budgets. A higher annual budget causes higher monthly expenses, making it more difficult to keep the studio profitable, which provides a greater challenge to the player.

1. New In Town ($125,000,000 annual budget)
2. Still Green ($250,000,000 annual budget)
3. On My Way ($500,000,000 annual budget)
4. Hollywood Player ($750,000,000 annual budget)
5. Hollywood Mogul ($1,000,000,000 annual budget)

Movies come in fifteen set genres, ranging from comedy to drama to science fiction, as well as six subgenres such as "farce" or "slapstick". Movies can rise and fall depending on what genre they are and what time of year they are released.

Acting, screenwriting and directing talent also play a great role in the success of a film. More popular talent costs more to hire, but have the benefit of raising the noticeability of a film. Likewise, production budget, special effects budgets and advertising play a big role as well.

== Reception ==
Computer Gaming World's reviewer in April 1994 said that despite Hollywood Mogul's "crude visual look ... I have found myself spending dozens of hours as a Hollywood bigwig rather than playing dozens of more expensive and graphically sexy games". Despite the lack of limited or award season-oriented releases, he concluded that it "is a fascinating exercise for the detail-oriented gamer" preferring statistics over action or visuals.

== See also ==
- The Movies, a 2005 business simulation game
