= Amstrad Mega PC =

Hybrid personal computer / game console

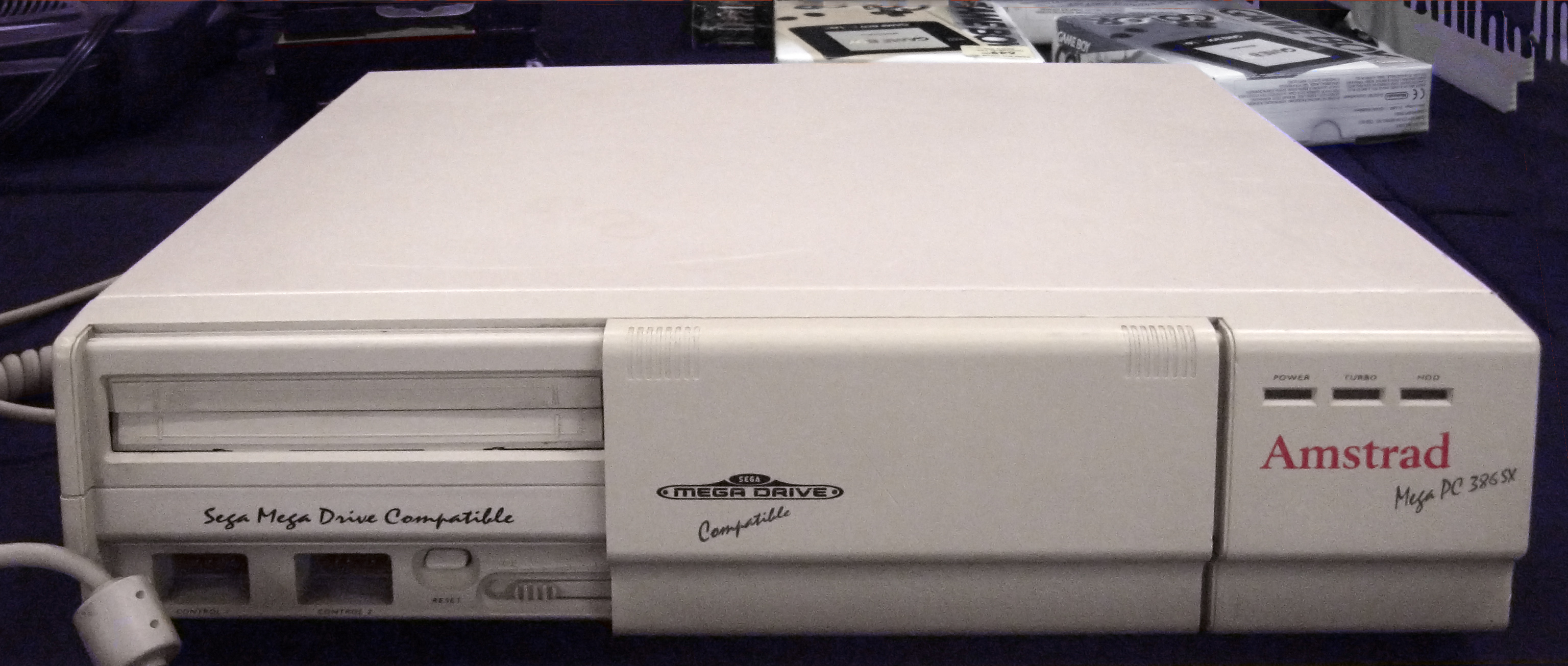
- Close up of the front of the unit
- Developer: Amstrad
- Manufacturer: Amstrad (licensed by Sega)
- Type: Video game console / Personal computer
- Generation: Fourth generation (16-bit era)
- Released: 1993
- Lifespan: Europe 1993; Australia 1993
- Discontinued: 1994
- Media: Cartridge, Diskette
- Operating system: MS-DOS 5.0 with Amstrad Desktop and Counterpoint
- CPU: 32-bit Intel 80386SX @ 25 MHz; Motorola 68000 @ 7.14 MHz
- Memory: 1MB 30-pin SIMM RAM (expandable to 16MB)
- Storage: 40MB Hard Drive, 3.5" Floppy Disk
- Graphics: SVGA Graphics with 256KB RAM
- Power: ≈50W
- Dimensions: 325 mm(w) x 78 mm(h) x 292 mm(d)

The Mega PC is a computer manufactured and released by Amstrad in 1993 under license from Sega. It was similar but unrelated to the Sega TeraDrive. It is a standard Amstrad PC with Sega Mega Drive hardware bundled inside; the system was wired to share the dual-sync monitor and speakers with the Mega Drive on a separate circuit board.

Initially released in PAL areas such as Europe and Australia in 1993, its success was short-lived due to its high price of £999.99 (later reduced to £599) and a CPU that was outdated by the time of its release. It was slightly easier to acquire an Amstrad Mega PC than the Sega TeraDrive system due to higher manufacturing volumes. Both systems have become collector's items.

== Technical specifications ==
Advert promoting the Amstrad Mega PC

The Mega PC was as a more robust unit than Sega's TeraDrive and had more efficient air circulation. The Mega PC was IBM-compatible and had a Mega Drive ISA card, a Mega Drive controller, keyboard, mouse, monitor, joystick and internal speakers.

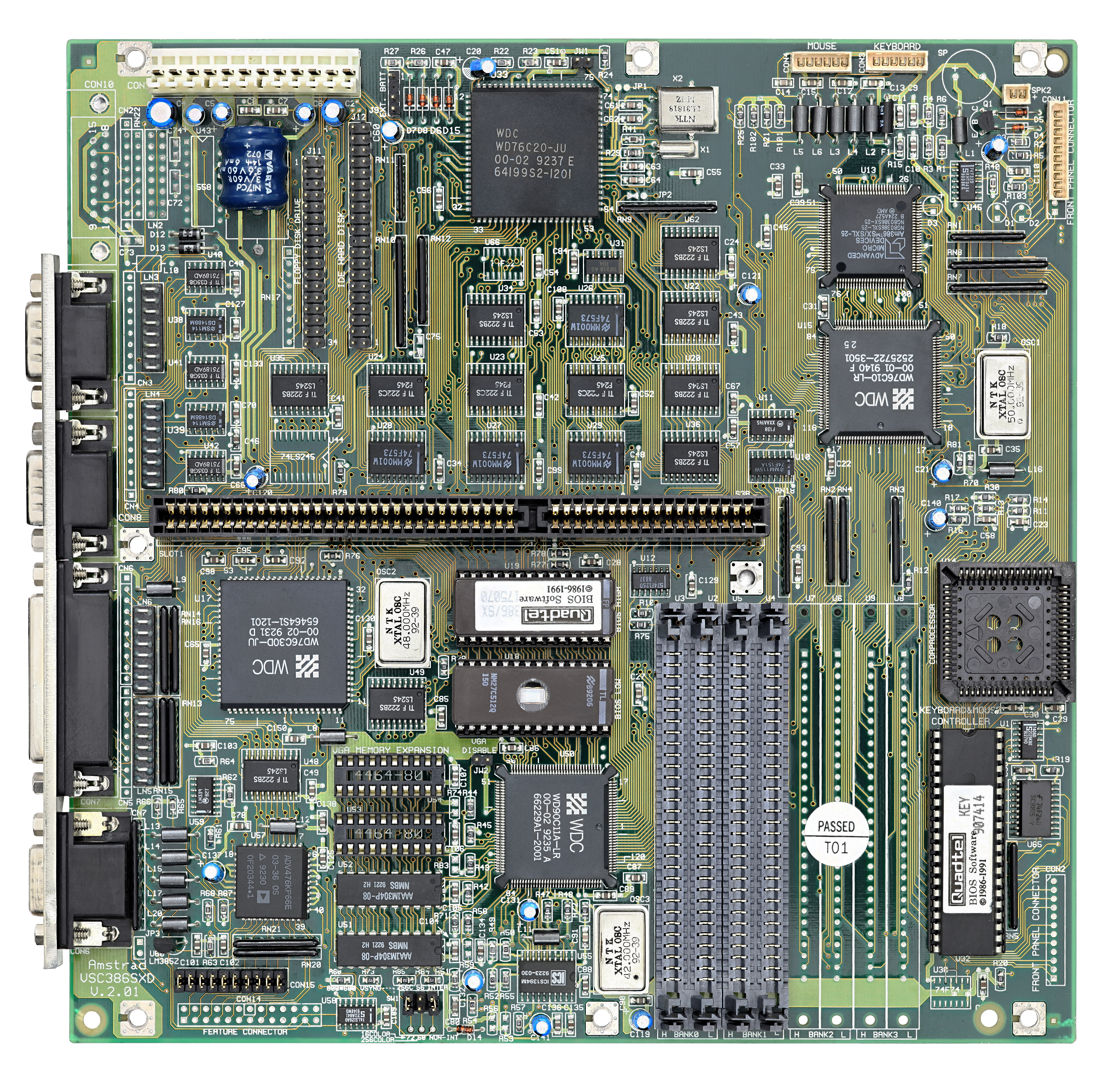
Mega PC motherboard, code VSC386SXD

The machine shipped with 1MB of RAM, provided by 4× 256KB 30-pin SIMM sticks. This was expandable to 16MB by using 4× 4MB memory modules.

Although it boasted a higher specification than the Sega TeraDrive (having more RAM and a faster processor), the specification of the Mega PC's CPU was a generation old. The newer Intel 80486 was on the market and the first Pentium processors were released the same year as the Mega PC. The system was unable to act as a Software Development Kit due to its inability to simultaneously use the PC and the Mega Drive hardware. A cover on the front of the unit prevented the insertion of a Mega Drive game cartridge while using the PC hardware.

=== Input/Output ===
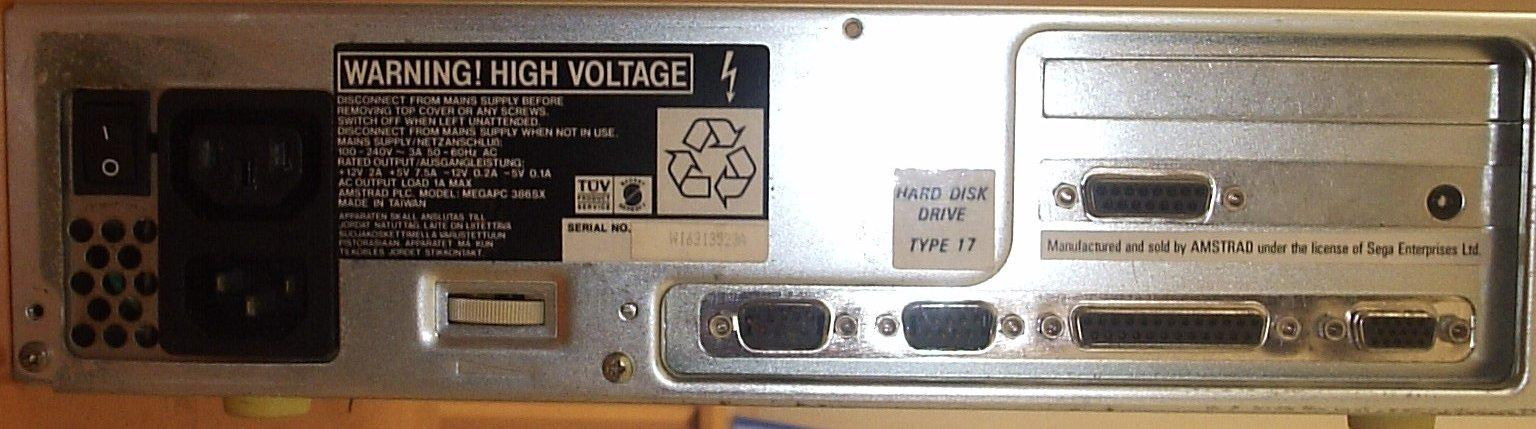
Close up of the rear of the unit, showing ports and their positions

The machine's rear houses multiple I/O ports. These include two serial ports, a 25-pin parallel port, a VGA port with combined signals for a standard VGA monitor and sound (Amstrad monitor only), a speaker/headphone jack, and a 15-pin game port for a joystick.

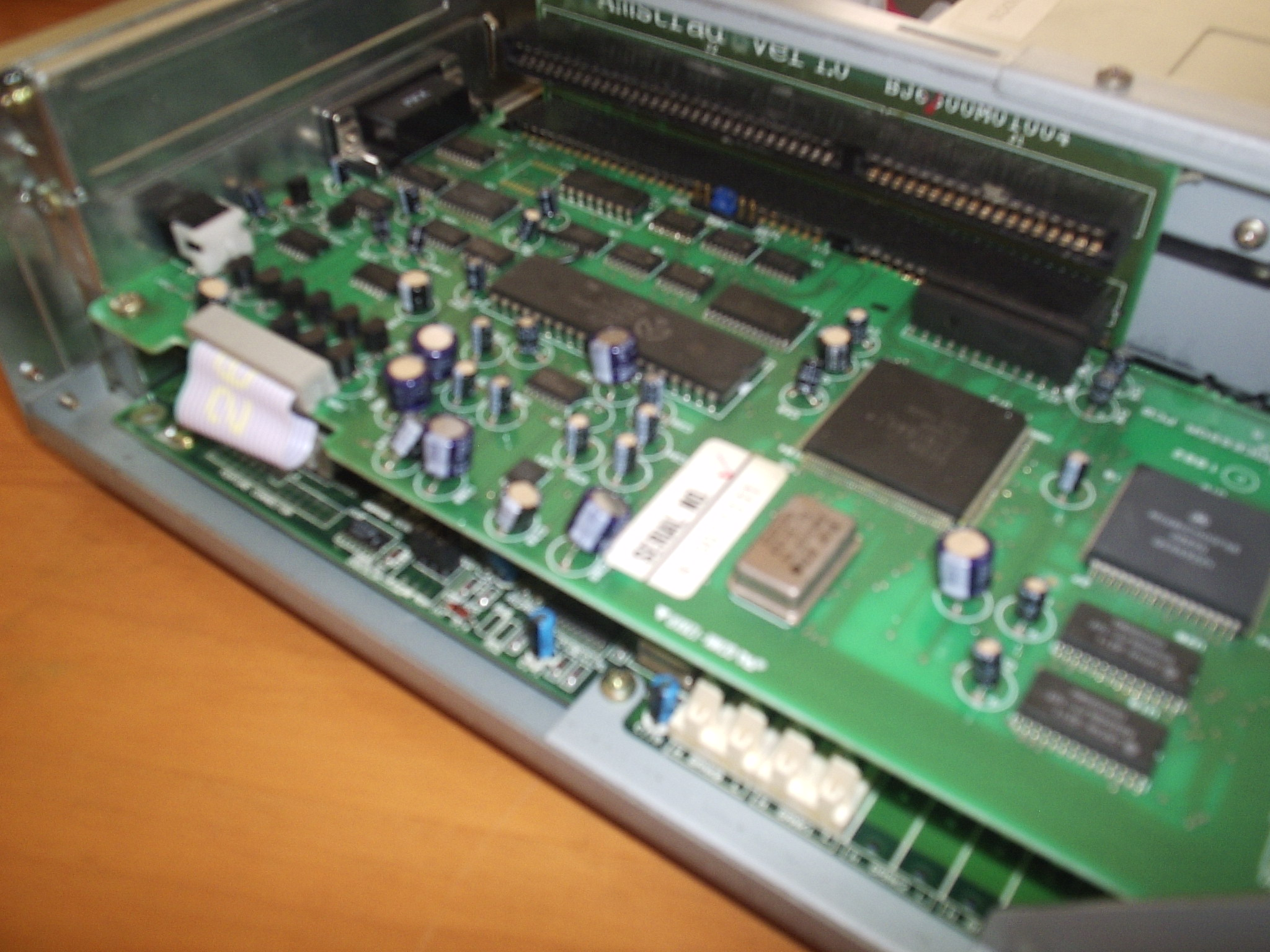
View of the ISA card inside the Mega PC, showing the free ISA slot

The motherboard includes a 16-bit ISA slot connected to a riser card, providing a total of two 16-bit ISA slots. One of these slots is populated with an ISA card, which provides connections for sound at the rear of the machine and a connection for the Mega Drive cartridge at the front. The other slot was left free for expansion (such as the addition of a modem, Network Interface Card or The Mega Card).

The Sega TeraDrive includes stereo RCA jacks and composite NTSC video output for connection to a TV, whereas the Mega PC lacks this feature, but could be connected to a PAL TV through SCART. Outputs from both the PC and Mega Drive units are available from a shared VGA connector, but since video output from the Mega Drive is still 15 kHz RGB it works fine when connected to a TV using SCART. When using the PC hardware, only a Multisync or VGA monitor can be used, as the unit outputs video at 31 kHz.

=== Compatibility ===
The system shipped with an Amstrad-branded controller that is internally identical to Sega's, allowing the controllers to be used on either system.

== Peripherals ==
Amstrad bundled several peripherals with its Mega PC, including:

- Dual-sync 15 kHz/31 kHz Amstrad-branded 14" white monitor with internal speakers
- Mega Drive white control pad with Amstrad branding and Amstrad white joystick
- Standard Amstrad keyboard and mouse using PS/2 interface

== Sales ==
The machine launched in 1993, selling in Australia with a retail price in February of AU$1999 (equivalent to $4,200 in 2022), although small discounts were offered and had fallen to AU$1499 (equivalent to $3,100 in 2022) by June. In the United Kingdom, the unit was selling for between £550 and £600 (equivalent to £1,200 in 2024), with variable pricing depending upon what came bundled.

== Mega Plus ==
Amstrad advertised, but never released, a successor to the Mega PC named the Amstrad Mega Plus. It boasted slightly higher specifications, with the processor upgraded to a Cyrix Cx486SLC running at 33 MHz and a RAM upgrade of 4× 1MB SIMM modules (4MB).

== See also ==
- Amstrad
- Sega TeraDrive
- Sega MegaDrive
- MS-DOS
