= Franchise Hockey Manager =

Sports text video game

- Genres: Sports game Business simulation game
- Developers: game54 Software, Out of the Park Developments
- Publisher: Out of the Park Developments
- Platforms: Mac OS X, Windows
- First release: Franchise Hockey Manager 2014; September 3, 2013
- Latest release: Franchise Hockey Manager 13; November 12, 2026

Franchise Hockey Manager (FHM), is a text-based ice hockey simulation video game for career, historical, and fictional play developed and published by Out of the Park Developments. "FHM creates a management simulator that offers total, believable depth in managing a hockey franchise," PopMatters said in a review.

FHM's publisher, OOTP Developments, is well known as the company behind the long-running series Out of the Park Baseball.

== Games ==
Game	Release date	Platforms
Franchise Hockey Manager 2014	September 3, 2013	Windows 8
Franchise Hockey Manager 1	September 2014	Windows 10
Franchise Hockey Manager 2	September 28, 2015	Windows 10
Franchise Hockey Manager 3	October 31, 2016	Windows 10
Franchise Hockey Manager 4	October 6, 2017	Windows 10
Franchise Hockey Manager 5	October 5, 2018	Windows 10
Franchise Hockey Manager 6	October 11, 2019	Windows 10, Mac OS
Franchise Hockey Manager 7	December 16, 2020	Windows 10, Mac OS
Franchise Hockey Manager 8	October 26, 2021	Windows 10, Mac OS
Franchise Hockey Manager 9	November 8, 2022	Windows 10/Windows 11, Mac OS
Franchise Hockey Manager 10	November 7, 2023	Windows 10/Windows 11, Mac OS
Franchise Hockey Manager 11	October 24, 2024	Windows 10/Windows 11, Mac OS
Franchise Hockey Manager 12	October 23, 2025	Windows 10/Windows 11, Mac OS
Franchise Hockey Manager 13	November 12, 2026	Windows 10/Windows 11, Mac OS

== History ==
=== First versions ===
The first version of Franchise Hockey Manager (FHM) was released in 2011, it was developed by Out of the Park Developments. The game was initially released for PC, but later versions have also been made available for mobile devices.

The first version of FHM allowed players to take control of a professional hockey team as the general manager. Players could make roster moves, set lineups, and make trades, all while trying to lead their team to success on the ice and financially. The game featured a realistic simulation engine that took into account many factors such as player ratings, team strategies, and league rules to create a realistic representation of the sport. The game included real-life players and teams, and the player could play games or simulate the seasons.

The initial version of the game was well received by fans of hockey and management simulation games, and it was considered a solid starting point for the series. Out of the Park Developments continued to improve and expand upon the game with each new version, adding new features and improvements.

The first version, Franchise Hockey Manager 2014 (FHM 2014), was released on September 3, 2013. It featured 19 leagues from around the world, It also included historical NHL play back to 1947 and the entire 1970s history of the WHA.

"The amount of detail involved is great -- they have rosters and prospects for all NHL teams, but also for junior and European leagues -- and it's still fun to mix and match line combinations," wrote The Sports Network columnist Scott Cullen in a column on Oct. 2, 2013.

A major update to the game, released on March 9, 2014, included: new training, scouting, and staff/personnel systems; four new leagues in the US, Switzerland, Asia, and Finland; a new blind mode; and many fixes and improvements. With that release, the game now had 23 leagues.

FHM 2 was released on September 28, 2015, on Mac and PC. The new version allows the user to take control of a team in any of 21 leagues from around the world, including the NHL, KHL, Canadian leagues, minor leagues in the US, leagues in the UK, leagues in Sweden and Finland, and more. Players can also play any historical NHL or WHA season back to 1931 or create a custom fictional setup. FHM 2 also contains a new game engine, a revamped tactics system and support for league expansion.

Like its cousin, Out of the Park Baseball, FHM puts players in the role of a general manager and coach: They sign free agents, trade players, set up strategies, decide on lines, and more.

FHM 2 has been noted as being a large improvement over its predecessor.

"When all's said and done, Franchise Hockey Manager 2 is a big step up from its predecessor. Those who have stuck by the developer and go out and purchase this game having previously owned FHM 2014 will find a much more polished game this time around. They will also be pleased with the care and attention the team have given to the database, game modes and options, and the sheer number of teams and players available from the get go," wrote The Digital Fix.

=== Later editions ===
Franchise Hockey Manager 3

The Next Generation of Hockey Strategy. Franchise Hockey Manager 3 was the first game in the series to be officially licensed by the NHL. FHM3 also added the controversial "Path to Glory" Mode, which gave the player Clear Goals and a strict timeline to find success at being a General Manager. FHM3 also added International Play for the first time in the series, allowing you to chase gold medals with your favorite country.

Franchise Hockey Manager 4

Go Big or Go Home. Franchise Hockey Manager 4 added every NHL season in league history (1917 to 2017) to the historical mode, allowed more customization in Custom Games, and added the ability to redraft the Vegas Golden Knights team. FHM4 also added Historical Challenges, giving players specific goals and timelines to earn both achievements in-game as well as on Steam with the Steam version.

Franchise Hockey Manager 5

Etch Your Name. Franchise Hockey Manager 5 added a new, more in-depth tactics system to the series, introduced Team Chemistry, and brought back the return of Online Leagues, returning to the franchise for the first time since Franchise Hockey Manager 2. FHM5 also added new Historical Challenges to add more Achievements to the game.

Franchise Hockey Manager 6

Rivalry Defined. Franchise Hockey Manager 6 added a Rivalry and Fan Happiness system to the games core mechanics, to keep your manager accountable to the owner and fans. Exhibition Mode was also added to FHM6, while a mid-season update also brought the ability to create custom expansion drafts for editable leagues.

Franchise Hockey Manager 7

Live Every Moment. Franchise Hockey Manager 7 added a brand new 2D engine to the FHM series for the first time. FHM7 also added major Historical International Tournaments (including the Summit Series, Olympics and Canada Cups), Revamped Custom Games to add additional fictional leagues, and a new Scouting System focusing on regions rather than leagues. Wanted community features were added including Farm Team Control, and Historical Editing.

Franchise Hockey Manager 8

Leave your Mark, Build Your Legacy. Franchise Hockey Manager 8 added a Financial System to the game to impact how team owners allowed you to spend their money. In-Game Feedback allowed for further adjustments, New Advanced Stats and News Stories were added to FHM8 as well as prospect rankings, player special abilities, as well as the ability to redraft the Seattle Kraken expansion team.

Franchise Hockey Manager 9

World Class Hockey. Franchise Hockey Manager 9 brought American College Hockey (featuring over 60 Division 1 Teams), Team Harmony system (where cliques can form), injury deferral, more tactical feedback for the user, Historical World Juniors, and continued advancements of the 2D Game Engine.

== Development ==
In an April 3, 2014 interview conducted by Bryan Calhoun, who co-hosts the Got Game show on the Sportsnet AM 590 radio station in Toronto, for the Sportsnet web site, FHM producer Jeff Riddolls explained that the game is "part of a genre of sports management games that's very popular in Europe – Football Manager, our soccer counterpart, sells well over a million copies annually – but only has a small audience on our side of the Atlantic so far."

When Calhoun asked how the game handles the unique rules of the many leagues in the game, Riddolls explained: "It does [have them]. In some cases, though, those rules are a little difficult to model within the game - the limitations on the use of 15-year-olds in major junior, for example. So we occasionally have to handle them in an abstract way or leave a rule out if it just won't work in a game setting, but for the most part we try to have the league rules work as accurately as possible."

Riddolls also confirmed that like OOTP Developments' other major title, Out of the Park Baseball, FHM will be an annual release.
