= TeraDrive =

Home video game console

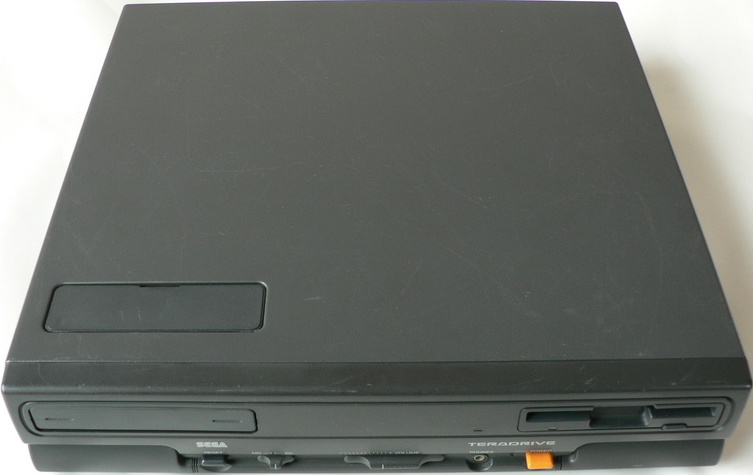
- Developer: Sega
- Manufacturer: IBM
- Type: Video game console / Personal computer
- Generation: Fourth generation
- Released: JP: May 31, 1991
- Media: Cartridge, diskette
- CPU: 16-bit Intel 80286; Motorola 68000; Zilog Z80
- Backward compatibility: Mega Drive
- Successor: Amstrad Mega PC (3rd party product developed on licence by Amstrad)

The TeraDrive (テラドライブ, TeraDoraibu) is an IBM PC compatible system with an integrated Mega Drive, developed by Sega and manufactured by IBM in 1991. The TeraDrive allowed for Mega Drive games to be played the same time as the PC section is being used, as it is possible for the Mega Drive and PC hardware to interact with each other.

The system was only released in Japan. Sega hoped that integrating the then-popular Mega Drive console into an IBM PC would attract potential customers wishing to purchase a PC, but the system proved unpopular and was a commercial failure.

== Design ==
One of the main processors used for the system is the Intel 80286, which was released in 1982. However, by the time the TeraDrive was released in 1991, this processor was almost 10 years out of date - the more powerful 25 MHz Intel 80486 had been released in 1989, making the TeraDrive's central processor 2 generations behind its time. The system also contains a Motorola 68000 and a Zilog Z80, the same processors which were used in the Mega Drive, that ran at 7.67 MHz and 3.58 MHz respectively.

The machine's front panel ports included two Mega Drive pad ports which were similar in design to 9-pin male serial ports, and 2 PS/2 ports to the right side of the unit to accommodate for the mouse and keyboard. The system also contained several ports to its rear. In order from left to right: 9-pin male serial port, 25-pin parallel port for connection to a printer, stereo RCA jacks and composite NTSC video output for connection to a TV, analogue RGB for monitor connection, and a 2nd 9-pin male serial connector labelled "EXT", similar to that found on the rear of an original Mega Drive base unit.

The motherboard also had a spare ISA slot available for expansion, with a hole at the rear of the unit to accommodate this.

== Interface ==
Its interface consisted of a start-up menu with several options, including a file manager, DOS, a clock and Mega Drive mode.

The machine included IBM drivers bundled on a floppy disk, which enabled properly written software to operate in the machine's RAM and then run on the native Mega Drive hardware. A good example of this shown in the Puzzle Construction program, one of the very few software titles included with the TeraDrive, which included a PC-side editor suite for changing the features of a falling-block puzzle game, then playable on the Mega Drive side. The operating system shipped with the system was IBM's DOS J4.0/V, which was similar to PC DOS.

There was often speculation that the TeraDrive was specifically designed as a purpose-made development kit, to allow software makers to develop their software titles for the Mega Drive. However, given the release date of the TeraDrive (some years after the initial Mega Drive release), as well as the availability of Sega's own game development hardware, it is unlikely the TeraDrive was designed for this purpose.

== Peripherals ==
The system's peripherals which were included or available separately, included 2 × Mega Drive pads, 1 × PS/2 Mouse, 1 × Sega branded PS/2 IBM keyboard and 1 × 3-button joystick. The Mouse and Mega Drive pads were practically identical to those found on the Mega Drive console version.

A monitor which was manufactured by a 3rd party company but with Sega branding, was available separately at a price of ¥79,800 (estimated US$600/GBP £300 at the time), which was capable of displaying 15 kHz RGB video signals from the Mega Drive hardware and a 31 kHz VGA output from the PC hardware, both from the VGA connector.

== Models ==
Three models were available, ranging from ¥148,000 (US$1100/GBP £580) to ¥248,000 (US$1840/GBP £950).

Technical specifications
Model	Model 1	Model 2	Model 3
Price (at launch)	¥148,000	¥188,000	¥248,000
Processor	Intel 80286 (10 MHz), Motorola 68000, Zilog Z80		
RAM (available / maximum)	640 KB/2.5 MB	1 MB/2.5 MB	2.5 MB/2.5 MB
Storage	1 FDD	2 FDDs	1 FDD, 1 30MB HDD
Graphics modes	PC Mode; 640×480 pixels (262144 colors / 16 onscreen); 320×200 pixels (262144 / 256; Mode 13h); Mega Drive Mode; 320×224 pixels (512 / 64); 256×224 pixels (512 / 64)		
I/O ports	PC; 1 × VGA monitor connector; 1 × Parallel port (for a printer); 2 × Serial ports (RS-232C); 2 × PS/2 (Mouse and Keyboard); Mega Drive; 2 × DE-9M (9-pin male D-connectors); 1 × Expansion		
Operating system	IBM DOS J4.0/V		

== Sales ==
The system proved unpopular with the Japanese market and ultimately failed. Production numbers are unknown.

The system is moderately rare in Japan, although prices are rising rapidly due to collector demand. The price to buy a TeraDrive in June 2003 was triple the price it was 2 years prior.

A new PC was also in the discussion stages to be developed by Sega under the leadership of ex-IBM executive Narutomi. but this likely never got past the discussion stages due to the failure of the TeraDrive.

== Similar products ==
A similar, but unrelated system was manufactured by Amstrad and sold under the name Mega PC in PAL areas such as Europe and Australia. Although it boasted a higher specification than that of Sega's TeraDrive, it was unable to act as a Software Development Kit due to the inability to interact both the PC and the Mega Drive together, as it was essentially just a PC with a Mega Drive bundled inside.

== See also ==
- Variations of the Sega Mega Drive
