= Coffee Tycoon =

2005 video game

- Developer(s): Jamopolis Interactive
- Publisher(s): Reflexive Arcade
- Platform(s): PC
- Release: April 30, 2005 (US)
- Genre(s): Business simulation
- Mode(s): Single player

Coffee Tycoon is a business simulation game developed by Jamopolis Interactive, published by Reflexive Arcade, and released in 2005. The game involves managing a coffee business by buying new stores, recipes & advertisements.
