= AtGames =

American video game and video game console manufacturer

AtGames Cloud Holdings Inc.
- Type: Private
- Industry: Video games
- Founded: 2001
- Headquarters: El Segundo, California, United States
- Area served: Worldwide
- Products: Video game console
- Brands: Legends Ultimate; Legends Gamer Series; Atari Flashback series; Legends Flashback; Blast! Line
- Website: atgames.us

AtGames Cloud Holdings Inc. (formerly AtGames Digital Media Inc.) is an American video game and console manufacturer, known for their Legends Ultimate Arcade and creating the connected arcade. Since 2011, they have produced and marketed the dedicated home video game console series Atari Flashback under license from Atari. Additionally, AtGames has produced ColecoVision and Intellivision Flashback consoles and worked with Sega on multiple different handhelds and retro consoles.

== History ==
In August 2014, GameFly announced on its website that AtGames had acquired its online games distribution service. AtGames relaunched this service under the name Direct2Drive in late 2014. In December 2014, AtGames purchased the IP to Calxeda through its subsidiary Silver Lining Systems, and was using the acquired technology to build fabric interconnects for A1100-powered servers as of January 2016.

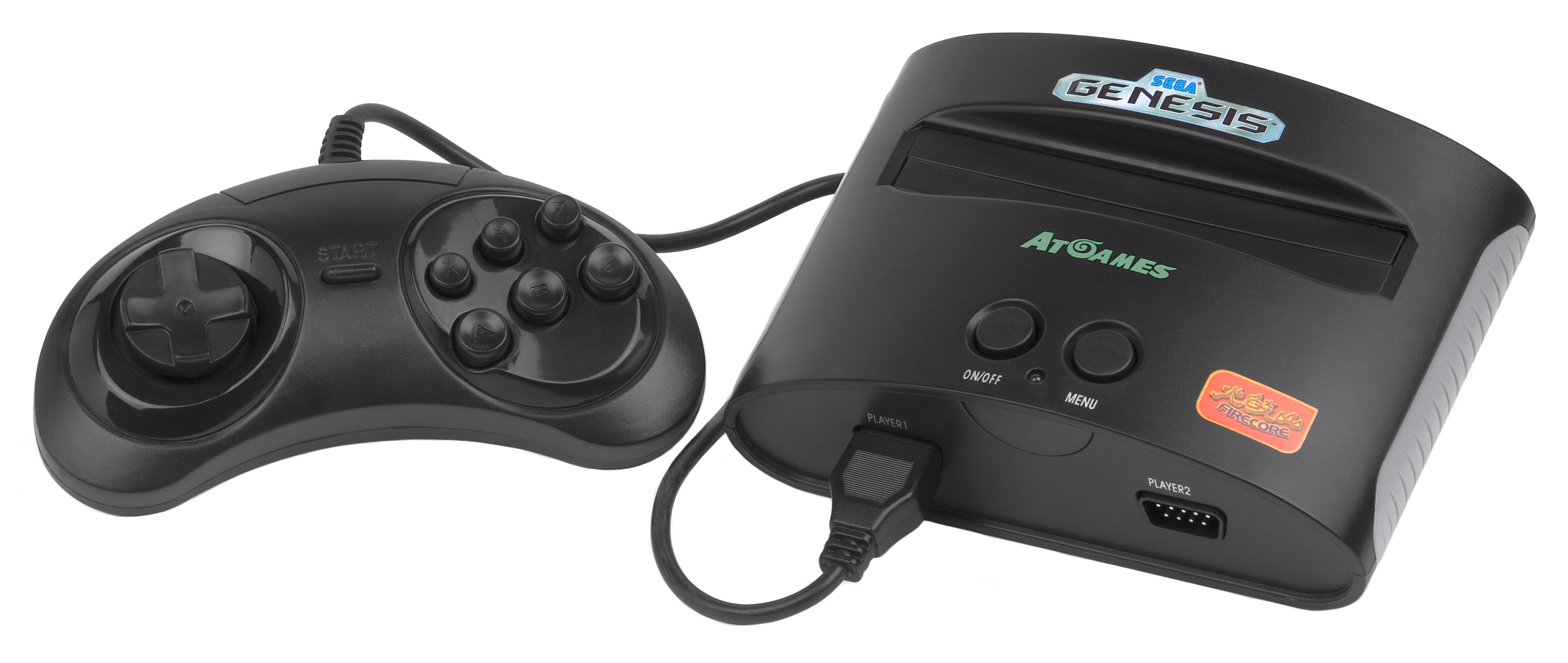
Fire-core console

In August 2019, AtGames acquired the royalty interest owed to General Computer Corporation (GCC) for Ms. Pac-Man.

In January 2020, AtGames announced a partnership with Taito.

In June 2020, AtGames announced a partnership with FarSight Studios in which 22 Gottlieb pinball tables from their The Pinball Arcade video game would be ported over to AtGames' newest flagship, the AtGames Legends Pinball (ALP) machine. Since then, AtGames has continued its Legends line by adding consoles with arcade control decks (Legends Gamer, Core, and Legends Core Max) as well as their AtGames Legends Ultimate Mini (ALU Mini) and most recently, the AtGames Legends Pinball Micro (ALP Micro). A miniature version of the full-size ALP.

AtGames has expanded the capabilities of these devices by adding more accessories, like the QuadPlay, a four-player control deck for the ALU. AtGames has also partnered with Magic Pixel Studios to port over their Zaccaria Pinball tables as well as to develop new pinball tables taken from various intellectual properties.

In 2023 AtGames collaborated with Zen Studios to release a range of Legends Pinball 4KP cabinets, with the first version themed after The Addams Family. In addition to tables previously released for the ALP, some tables from Pinball FX were released.

== Products ==
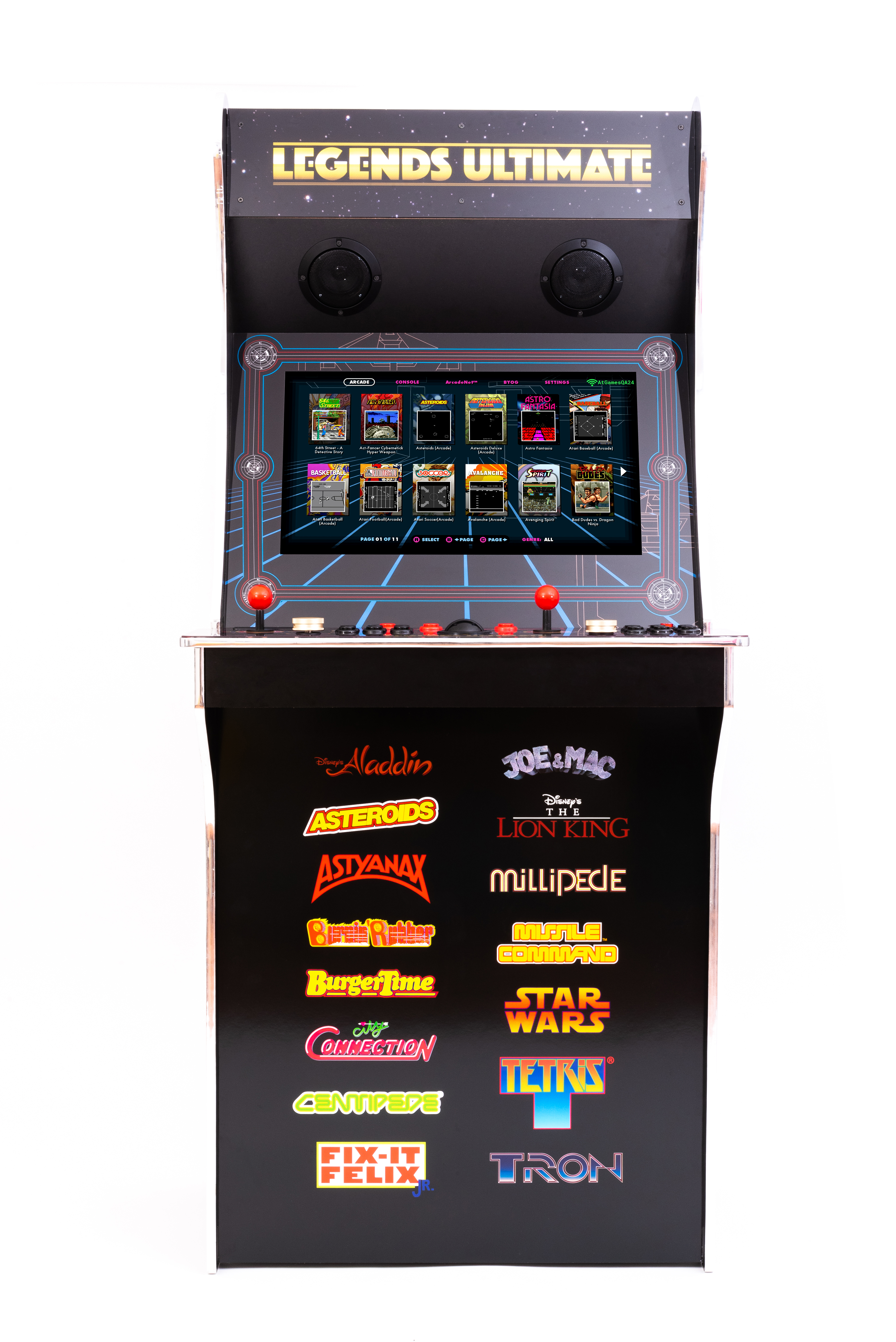
AtGames Legends Ultimate Arcade

Starting in 2018, AtGames has released HDMI dongle "Mini Console Sticks", bundled with Sega Genesis-like controllers dubbed "Flashback Blast!" These consoles contain multiple games from different companies, such as Bandai Namco, Atari and Taito. Starting in 2019, the consoles included games licensed from Disney including Tron, The Jungle Book, The Lion King, and the Star Wars games.

In November 2019, AtGames released the 66-inch tall Legends Ultimate arcade cabinet, featuring 350 built-in licensed arcade games on a 24-inch HD screen. In December 2019, AtGames announced its ArcadeNet service, offering games on demand for streaming, download, and purchase on the Legends Ultimate arcade platform.

In August 2020, AtGames announced that the Legends Ultimate 1.1 would hit retail on August 31, 2020, featuring a library of 300 arcade titles from Atari, Data East, Jaleco, The Tetris Company, and Disney.

In September 2020, AtGames announced the Legends Gamer series of wireless arcade controllers, including the Legends Gamer Mini, Legends Gamer and Legends Gamer Pro. The Legends Gamer Mini comes with 100 classic arcade and home video games, while the Legends Gamer and Legends Gamer Pro come with 150 classic arcade and home video games including titles from Disney, Taito, and The Tetris Company.

== Reception and controversies ==
In 2018, AtGames sent an incorrect version of its Bandai Namco Flashback plug-and-play console to reviewers. The review copy contained authentic emulated arcade ROMs while the released version contained NES versions, which were considerable downgrades and did not match the review copies.

American pharmaceutical chain Walgreens sued AtGames in 2019 for a breach of contract. The suit alleged AtGames owed nearly $1.62 million for unsold and returned products.

In 2019, AtGames acquired the royalty rights for Ms. Pac-Man from General Computer Corporation, forbidding Bandai Namco to use the Ms. Pac-Man character. Beginning with the 2022 Arcade Archives release of Pac-Land, the character has been removed from games that previously featured her.

== See also ==
- Sega Gopher, also known as the Sega Genesis Arcade Ultimate Portable Player
