= GameFly =

American online video game rental subscription service

GameFly Holdings, LLC.
- Type: Private
- Founded: April 15, 2002; 24 years ago
- Founders: Sean Spector (Co-Founder); Jung Suh (Co-Founder)
- Headquarters: Los Angeles, California, U.S.
- Key people: Jeff Walker (CEO); Tim Hinsley (President)
- Website: Official website

GameFly is a privately held American online video game rental subscription service that specializes in providing games for Nintendo, Sony, and Microsoft systems starting from the sixth generation onwards. The business model of GameFly is similar to the DVD-by-mail subscription service Netflix and Blockbuster online. GameFly sends games to subscribers for a monthly fee.

== History ==
In May 2002, Sean Spector and Jung Suh partnered with founding CEO Toby Lenk to start GameFly. GameFly later received venture capital funding from Sequoia Capital. In February 2009, GameFly acquired the gaming news and community site Shacknews, along with its download and streaming video sites. In 2009 GameFly sued the U.S. Postal Service alleging the favoring of Netflix and Blockbuster by sorting their DVDs at no charge.

It was reported in February 2011 that GameFly had acquired MobyGames. Despite filing plans in February 2010 for an initial public offering, GameFly remains a privately owned company as of 2017. In May 2018, Electronic Arts announced that they acquired cloud gaming technology assets and personnel from GameFly (including its Israeli outpost). In April 2014, GameFly sold Direct2Drive to AtGames.
