= Crack Down =

1989 run and gun video game

- Developers: Sega; Hot-B (Genesis)
- Publishers: Sega; Sage's Creation (Genesis); U.S. Gold (home computers)
- Composer: Yasuhiro Kawakami
- Platforms: Arcade, Mega Drive/Genesis, Atari ST, Amiga, Amstrad CPC, Commodore 64, MS-DOS, ZX Spectrum
- Release: Arcade; 1989; Mega Drive/Genesis: JP: December 20, 1990; NA: March 1991; EU: 1991
- Genre: Run and gun
- Modes: Single-player, multiplayer

Crack Down (クラックダウン) is a run and gun arcade game released by Sega in 1989 and ported to the Sega Mega Drive/Genesis in 1990 in Japan and 1991 in North America and Europe by Sage's Creation and Sega respectively. It was also ported and released to a number of home computer platforms by U.S. Gold.

The Mega Drive version of Crack Down was re-released in 2007 on the Wii Virtual Console in Japan on August 7, and in PAL regions on September 7. It was also released on Steam on June 1, 2010.

== Gameplay ==
Arcade screenshot

Using a top-down perspective (akin to Gauntlet), the player controls either Ben or Andy, a pair of agents charged with stopping mad scientist Mr. X (Mr.K in the Sega Mega Drive version) from taking over the world, as they make their way through several timed levels, planting bombs and destroying cyborg enemies using guns (the "machine gun" and the "cannon" can be swapped back and forth) and smart bombs (which wipe out all enemies on screen). The goal of each stage is to plant all of the bombs and escape before their collective timer goes off.

== Reception ==
Reception

Review scores
Publication	Score
AllGame	3/5 (SMD)
Console XS	82% (SMD)
MegaTech	65% (SMD)

Award
Publication	Award
Computer and Video Games	C+VG Hit

In Japan, Game Machine listed Crack Down on their May 15, 1989 issue as being the third most popular arcade game during the previous two weeks. Console XS gave a review score of 82%, commending its detailed graphics, "addictive" gameplay, and the two player mode. They concluded saying it is worth playing. MegaTech gave the Genesis version a review score of 65%. They praised the two player mode, but criticized the game's lack of challenge.
