= Arrow Flash =

1990 video game

- European cover art
- Developer: Imaginative Technology Land
- Publishers: JP/EU: Sega; NA: Renovation Products
- Producer: Kenichi Hiza
- Platform: Sega Genesis
- Release: JP: October 20, 1990; NA: December 1990; PAL: 1991
- Genre: Scrolling shooter
- Mode: Single-player

Arrow Flash (Japanese: アローフラッシュ, Hepburn: Arō Furasshu) is a horizontally scrolling shooter video game developed by Imaginative Technology Land (I.T.L.) and published by Sega in Japan and Europe and by Renovation Products in the United States for the Sega Genesis in 1990. The game's main character pilots a prototype transformable fighter-mecha left from her grandfather to fight against an alien attack on humankind. The game is mostly a horizontal shooter, with one down scrolling stage.

== Gameplay ==
The player initially has a basic shot, which can be upgraded and/or exchanged for different weapons, as well as gain smaller ships that follow the player's ship around and copy its attacks. As is usual, these power-ups are distributed throughout the levels. They are retained when advancing to the next stage but lost entirely when the player loses a life.

Two additional mechanics differentiate Arrow Flash from similar scrolling shooters, one of which is the ability to transform the player's ship. The two forms available are a humanoid mech and a fighter jet, with the player's weapons changing depending on the form. The jet form only shoots forward but intensely, it can fly faster horizontally, and the helper ships follow the jet in a snakelike pattern. The mech form has a wider shooting angle (sometimes even firing backwards upon getting enough upgrades), has a faster vertical speed, and the helper ships remain in a fixed formation whilst in this form. Missiles will also home on enemies in mech form, whereas they only travel directly forward in jet form. Regardless of form, the ship is destroyed with only one hit unless the player picks up an energy shield, which can sustain three hits.

The game's titular "Arrow Flash" is a highly powerful ability, differing for each form: the jet fires five large blasts forward, while the mech form becomes engulfed in flame, rendering it immune to attacks for a short time. In the default "Stock" mode, Arrow Flashes are instant but limited, and must be used sparingly, while "Charge" mode allows arrow flashes to be used infinitely but with a weaker effect, and must be "charged up" before use.

== Plot ==
Arrow Flash follows the protagonist Zana Keene (named Anna Schwinn in the European release, and Starna Oval in the Japanese release) as she fights against hostile aliens. The game contains references to Gundam and Macross.

== Reception ==
Reception

Review scores
Publication	Score
Beep! MegaDrive	5.8/10
Electronic Gaming Monthly	6/10, 7/10, 6/10, 6/10
Famitsu	4/10, 6/10, 7/10, 5/10
Games-X	3/5
Mean Machines Sega	46%
Raze	73%
VideoGames & Computer Entertainment	5/10
Zero	69/100
Console XS	59/100
Game Zone	2/5
Mega	24%
Mega Drive Advanced Gaming	52%
MegaTech	46%
Sega Power	60%
Sega Pro	39/100

The Japanese publication Micom BASIC Magazine ranked Arrow Flash eighth in popularity in its January 1991 issue, and it received a 5.7193/10 score in a 1995 readers' poll conducted by the Japanese Sega Saturn Magazine, ranking among Sega Mega Drive titles at number 421. The game received mixed reviews from critics.
