= Out of the Park Baseball =

Sports simulation video game series

- Out of the Park Baseball 24 Logo
- Genres: Sports game Business simulation game
- Developer: Out of the Park Developments
- Publisher: Out of the Park Developments
- Platforms: Linux, Mac OS X, Windows
- First release: Out of the Park Baseball; May 1999
- Latest release: Out of the Park Baseball 27; March 13, 2026

Out of the Park Baseball Go! (formerly iOOTP Baseball and MLB Manager)
- Genres: Sports game Business simulation game
- Developer: Out of the Park Developments
- Publisher: Out of the Park Developments
- Platforms: iOS, Android (operating system)
- First release: iOOTP Baseball 2011; May 5, 2011
- Latest release: Out of the Park Baseball Go! June 15, 2021

Out of the Park Baseball (abbreviated as OOTP) is a text-based baseball simulation for career, historical, and fictional play.

Starting with OOTP 16, the game has licenses for Major League Baseball and Minor League Baseball.

== Games ==
Game	Release date	Platforms
OOTP Baseball	May, 1999	Windows 98
OOTP 2	March, 2000	Windows 98
OOTP 3	March 31, 2001	Windows 98
OOTP 4	February 28, 2002	Windows XP
OOTP 5	February 28, 2003	Windows XP
OOTP 6	June 14, 2004	Windows XP
OOTP 6.5	June 14, 2005	Windows XP
OOTP Baseball Manager 2006	May 31, 2006	Windows XP
OOTP Baseball 2007	March, 2007	Windows Vista
OOTP Baseball 8	December 17, 2007	Windows Vista
OOTP Baseball 9	June 18, 2008	Windows Vista
OOTP Baseball 10	March, 2009	Windows Vista
OOTP Baseball 11	April 14, 2010	Windows 7
OOTP Baseball 12	June 22, 2011	Windows 7
OOTP Baseball 13	March, 2012	Windows 7
OOTP Baseball 14	April 12, 2013	Windows 8, Linux, IOS
OOTP Baseball 15	April 24, 2014	Windows 8, Linux, IOS
OOTP Baseball 16	March 23, 2015	Windows 8, Linux, IOS
OOTP Baseball 17	March 22, 2016	Windows 10, Linux, IOS
OOTP Baseball 18	March 24, 2017	Windows 10, Linux, IOS
OOTP Baseball 19	March 22, 2018	Windows 10, MacOS, Linux
OOTP Baseball 20	March 22, 2019	Windows 10, MacOS, Linux
OOTP Baseball 21	March 20, 2020	Windows 10, MacOS, Linux
OOTP Baseball 22	March 26, 2021	Windows 10, Windows 11, MacOS, Linux
OOTP Baseball 23	April 22, 2022	Windows 10, Windows 11, MacOS, Linux
OOTP Baseball 24	March 24, 2023	Windows 10, Windows 11, MacOS, Linux
OOTP Baseball 25	March 15, 2024	Windows 10, Windows 11, MacOS
OOTP Baseball 26	March 14, 2025	Windows 10, Windows 11, MacOS
OOTP Baseball 27	March 13, 2026	Windows 10, Windows 11, MacOS

== History ==
The first version was released in May 1999 with the help of sportswriter Sean Lahman, who sold the game through his website. This initial version received attention from several online gaming sites. The breakthrough release came in 2001 with OOTP 3.

In 2002, lead developer Markus Heinsohn joined with other independent developers to form .400 Software Studios to publish OOTP 5. Heinsohn and a few others split from .400 Software Studios in mid-2003 to continue work on the OOTP series as well as Inside the Park Baseball.

In 2005 OOTP was purchased by Sports Interactive, makers of Football Manager and NHL Eastside Hockey Manager, though Heinsohn remained the game's primary creative force. Out of the Park Baseball 2006 was released on May 31, 2006. Sporting a rewritten codebase and several new features, it was met with mixed critical reaction.

Out of the Park Baseball 2007 the eighth iteration of the game, was released on March 23, 2007, to much better reviews than its predecessor. Out of the Park Baseball 2007 was Metacritic's second highest rated game on the PC platform with a score of 96 out of 100, scoring higher than The Orange Box, and second to Half-Life 2. Metacritic removed the game from the "Best PC Video Games of All Time" list in 2015 after being there almost nine years, due to a new review threshold limit.

On September 20, 2007, Sports Interactive announced the amicable severance of relations with Out of the Park Developments and the OOTP franchise.

In December 2007 Out of the Park Developments released Out of the Park Baseball 8, a simple update of OOTP 2007 that adjusted for the split from SI and added a few new features.

Since OOTP 2006 the user interface utilizes the P.I.S.D. Ltd platform libraries for cross-platform portability.

OOTP Developments released OOTP X (10) on June 5, 2009. OOTP 11 was released to the masses on April 14, 2010.

In October 2010 OOTP announced that development had started on iOOTP, a version of the game for iPhone and iPod touch. iOOTP became available at the App Store on May 5, 2011.

On May 13, 2011, it was announced that OOTP 12 was expected to be released to the general public on June 22, 2011, and on June 20 for those who pre-ordered the game. OOTP 12 was shipped to the general public on June 22, 2011, and on June 20 for those who pre-ordered the game, as expected.

On April 5, 2012 iOOTP Baseball 2012 Edition was released to Apple's iOS App Store. New features in iOOTP 2012 included 2012 major league rosters, detailed player histories, a revamped user interface, a new fictional setup, the ability to use pitch-by-pitch mode, the ability to use the DH in any league, and more. The iPad HD version, which takes advantage of the iPad's larger display, was included free, as in the 2011 version.

On April 9, 2012 OOTP 13 was released to the general public after an April 6 release to those who pre-ordered the game. New features in OOTP 13 included: 2012 major league rosters; a real-time simulation mode that lets players watch games play out in real-time (or at a faster speed); interactive storylines that allow gamers to make decisions when situations happen (for example, a star player becomes difficult—player can release him, trade him, or ignore the problem; each choice impacts fan attitudes, player morale, etc.); a revamped pitching model that more closely mirrors real life, where most drafted pitchers are starters and later become relievers, rather than being drafted as relievers; and random historical debut, which allows real players to show up at any point in history (perhaps Ruth shows up today and Koufax is drafted in the 1930s).

In addition, OOTP 13 offered a revamped user interface, more custom playoff options, Associations that can combine multiple leagues and share free agents, rules, core gameplay engine and AI improvements, and more.

On April 4, 2013 iOOTP Baseball 2013 was released to Apple's iOS App Store. New features in iOOTP 2013 included 2013 major league rosters, achievements, a redesigned interface, new trading AI, a new player development system, more realistic player creation, historical career play with real rookies imported each season, and more. The iPad HD version, which takes advantage of the iPad's larger display, was included free, as in the 2012 version.

On April 12, 2013 Out of the Park Baseball 14 was released to everyone who pre-ordered the game; the general worldwide release was April 15. New features in OOTP 14 included: 2013 major league rosters; a recoded player origin system, allowing, for example, foreign players to be signed as free agents, like Ichiro Suzuki and Yu Darvish were; a recoded scouting system; a new fielding ratings development system; a new Player Development Center for tracking purposes; achievements; new trading AI; more realistic player creation; a new in-game "Pitch to Contact" option; and more.

On April 24, 2014 Out of the Park Baseball 15 was released on Steam. It was released on April 18, 2014, on the OOTP Developments web site. New features in OOTP 15 included: Opening Day 2014 rosters for all major and minor league teams; support for 3D stadiums and 3D in-game ball flight; support for 7 real international leagues with real teams and players in Japan, Korea, Taiwan, and other countries; a new optional ratings system; a revamped interface; historical league improvements; and more.

iOOTP Baseball 2014 was released on the iOS App Store on April 17, 2014. New features included: Opening Day 2014 rosters; the ability to edit players; a redesigned interface; iPhone 5 and full Retina Display support; and more.

On January 23, 2015 Out of the Park Baseball 16 was announced for PC, Mac and Linux. Featuring a new license with Major League Baseball and Minor League Baseball, along with reworked finances, a new managers and coaches system, new independent leagues, and more, it was expected to be released in March of that year. OOTP 16 was released on March 23, 2015.

On the same day, OOTP Developments announced that iOOTP Baseball would now be known as MLB Manager, and the 2015 version would also be released in March for iOS and Android, with the MLB license applying to that game too. New features were due to be announced in February. MLB Manager 2015 was released on March 26, 2015.

Out of the Park Baseball 17 was released on March 22, 2016, on PC, Mac, and Linux. In addition to the MLB license added the previous season, OOTP 17 also features the MLBPA license. A host of new features were added, including the ability to play Historical Exhibitions against any teams ever in the "era" of the user's choosing. A "16 in '16" tournament was set up by the development team based upon ranking all-time teams by famous baseball writers such as Tim Kurkjian, Neil Paine, Mark Simon, Brian Kenny, Ken Hirdt, C.J. Nitkowski, and others. The 1927 Yankees were the tournament champions. Out of the Park Baseball 17 wound up tied with The Witcher 3 as the highest-rated PC game on Metacritic for 2016, with a rating of 92.

On March 20, 2020, Out of the Park Developments released OOTP Baseball 21.

== Gameplay ==
OOTP presents a minimal graphic depiction of a baseball diamond with text indicating positions and on-field action. Scrolling text allows one to follow the game as it unfolds. The game offers HTML and C++ reporting ample enough to engage baseball fans. Third-party developers have contributed utility programs that assist gamers in creating leagues, players, logos, and other game enhancements.

== Other versions ==
In 2001, a retail (physical media) version of OOTP3 called Season Ticket Baseball was released. Released a year later was its sequel, a retail version of OOTP4 titled Season Ticket Baseball 2003.

In 2004, Heinsohn released Inside the Park Baseball, which tracked the progression of an individual baseball player. Gamers followed a player's career from before the draft, through the minor leagues, until possibly called up to the Major Leagues. Inside the Park Baseball was designed to work alongside OOTP 5, whereby one might insert a player into an OOTP 5 season.

== Reception ==
=== Critical ===
Out of the Park Baseball 6 was a runner-up for Computer Games Magazine's 2004 "Best Independent Game" award, but lost to Gish.

The editors of Computer Games Magazine presented Out of the Park Baseball 2006 with their 2006 "Best Sports Game" award.

During the 7th Annual Interactive Achievement Awards, the Academy of Interactive Arts & Sciences nominated Out of the Park 5 for "Computer Sports Game of the Year", which was ultimately awarded to Madden NFL 2004.

=== Among baseball players and figures ===
Some sports figures have played the game, including writer and statistician Bill James, sports journalist Roy Firestone, and retired MLB pitcher Curt Schilling. Other ex-MLB fans of the game include Jeff Montgomery, Don Stanhouse, John D'Acquisto, and Lary Sorensen, who all participated in the 2012 Seamheads Laundry League, an online OOTP league that also featured ESPN's Eric Karabell and Jerry Crasnick, among other journalists, bloggers, and podcasters Pitcher Pat Neshek is also a fan, as well as Boston Red Sox principal owner John W. Henry.
