= Index of Windows games (N) =

This is an index of Microsoft Windows games.

This list has been split into multiple pages. Please use the Table of Contents to browse it.

Title	Released	Developer	Publisher
N	2005	Metanet Software	Metanet Software
NAM	1998	TNT Team	GT Interactive
Nanosaur	1998	Pangea Software	Pangea Software
Napoleon: Total War	2010	The Creative Assembly	Sega
Narbacular Drop	2005	Nuclear Monkey Software	DigiPen
Narc	2008	VIS Entertainment	Zoo Digital, zushi games ltd.
Narcissu	2005	stage-nana	insani
NASCAR Revolution	1999	Stormfront Studios	EA Sports
NASCAR 2000	2000	EA Sports, Stormfront Studios	EA Sports
NASCAR Racing 2	1996	Papyrus Design Group	Papyrus Design Group, Sierra On-Line
NASCAR Legends	1999	Papyrus Design Group	Sierra Sports
NASCAR Racing 1999 Edition	1999	Papyrus Design Group	Sierra On-Line
NASCAR Racing 3	1999	Papyrus Design Group	Sierra On-Line
NASCAR Racing 4	2001	Papyrus Design Group	Sierra Entertainment
NASCAR Racing 2002 Season	2002	Papyrus Design Group	Sierra Entertainment
NASCAR Racing 2003 Season	2003	Papyrus Design Group	Sierra Entertainment
NASCAR SimRacing	2005	EA Tiburon	EA Sports
NASCAR Thunder 2003	2002	EA Sports, Budcat Creations	Electronic Arts
NASCAR Thunder 2004	2003	EA Tiburon	EA Sports
The Nations	2001	JoWooD Productions	JoWooD Productions
Natural Selection	2002	Unknown Worlds Entertainment	Unknown Worlds Entertainment
Natural Selection 2	2009	Unknown Worlds Entertainment	Unknown Worlds Entertainment
NBA 2K10	2009	Visual Concepts	2K Sports
NBA 2K11	2010	Visual Concepts	2K Sports
NBA 2K12	2011	Visual Concepts	2K Sports
NBA 2K13	2012	Visual Concepts	2K Sports
NBA 2K14	2013	Visual Concepts	2K Sports
NBA 2K15	2014	Visual Concepts	2K Sports
NBA 2K16	2015	Visual Concepts	2K Sports
NBA 2K17	2016	Visual Concepts	2K Sports
NBA 2K18	2017	Visual Concepts	2K Sports
NBA 2K19	2018	Visual Concepts	2K Sports
NBA 2K20	2019	Visual Concepts	2K Sports
NBA Hangtime	1996	Midway Games	Midway Games
NBA Live 97	1996	Electronic Arts	Electronic Arts
NBA Live 98	1997	Electronic Arts	Electronic Arts
NBA Live 99	1998	NuFX	Electronic Arts
NBA Live 2000	1999	Electronic Arts Canada	Electronic Arts
NBA Live 2001	2000	Electronic Arts Canada	Electronic Arts
NBA Live 2002	2001	Electronic Arts Canada	Electronic Arts
NBA Live 2003	2002	EA Canada	Electronic Arts
NBA Live 2004	2003	EA Canada	Electronic Arts
NBA Live 2005	2004	EA Canada	Electronic Arts
NBA Live 06	2005	EA Canada	Electronic Arts
NBA Live 07	2006	EA Canada	EA Sports
NBA Live 08	2007	EA Canada, HB Studios Multimedia	EA Sports
Nebuchadnezzar	2021	Nepos Games	Nepos Games
Necrobarista	2020	Route 59 Games	Playism, Coconut Island Games
Necronomicon: The Dawning of Darkness	2001	Wanadoo Edition	The Adventure Company
NecroVisioN	2009	The Farm 51	505 Games
Need for Speed II	1997	EA Seattle, EA Canada	Electronic Arts
Need for Speed III: Hot Pursuit	1998	EA Canada	Electronic Arts
Need for Speed: High Stakes	1999	EA Canada	Electronic Arts
Need for Speed: Porsche Unleashed	2000	EA Canada	Electronic Arts
Need for Speed: Hot Pursuit 2	2002	Black Box Games/EA Black Box, EA Seattle	EA Games
Need for Speed: Underground	2003	EA Black Box	EA Games
Need for Speed: Underground 2	2004	EA Black Box	EA Games
Need for Speed: Most Wanted	2005	EA Canada	Electronic Arts
Need for Speed: Carbon	2006	EA Black Box, EA UK	Electronic Arts
Need for Speed: ProStreet	2007	EA Black Box	Electronic Arts
Need for Speed: Undercover	2008	EA Black Box	Electronic Arts
Need for Speed: Shift	2009	Slightly Mad Studios	Electronic Arts
Need for Speed: Hot Pursuit	2010	Criterion Games	Electronic Arts
Need for Speed: The Run	2011	EA Black Box, Firebrand Games	Electronic Arts
Need for Speed: Most Wanted	2012	Criterion Games	Electronic Arts
Need for Speed Rivals	2013	Ghost Games, Criterion Games	Electronic Arts
Need for Speed	2015	Ghost Games	Electronic Arts
Need for Speed Payback	2017	Ghost Games	Electronic Arts
Need for Speed Heat	2019	Ghost Games	Electronic Arts
Neighbours from Hell	2003	JoWooD Vienna	JoWooD Productions
Neighbours from Hell 2: On Vacation	2006	JoWood Productions	Cinemaware
Nelly Cootalot: Spoonbeaks Ahoy!	2007	Alasdair Beckett	
Neocron	2002	Reakktor Media GmbH	CDV Software
Neocron 2: Beyond Dome of York	2004	Reakktor Media GmbH	10tacle Studios
Neon Genesis Evangelion: Ayanami Raising Project	2001	Gainax, BROCCOLI	Gainax
Neon Genesis Evangelion: Shinji Ikari Raising Project	2004	Gainax	Gainax
Neon Wars	2006	Blitwise Productions	Blitwise Productions
Neopets Puzzle Adventure	2008	Griptonite Games, Infinite Interactive	Capcom
Nessy Learning Programme	2007	Net Educational Systems	Net Educational Systems
NetHack	2003	The NetHack DevTeam	The NetHack DevTeam
Nethergate	1998	Spiderweb Software	Spiderweb Software
netKar Pro	2006	Kunos Simulazioni	Kunos Simulazioni
Netrek	1996		
NetStorm: Islands At War	1997	Titanic Entertainment	Activision
Neuro Hunter	2005	Media Art	Deep Silver
The Neverhood	1996	The Neverhood, Inc.	DreamWorks Interactive
Nevermind	2015	Flying Mollusk	Flying Mollusk
Neverwinter Nights	2002	BioWare	Infogrames
Neverwinter Nights 2	2006	Obsidian Entertainment	Atari
Neverwinter Nights 2: Mask of the Betrayer	2007	Obsidian Entertainment	Atari
Neverwinter Nights 2: Mysteries of Westgate	2009	Ossian Studios	Atari
Neverwinter Nights 2: Storm of Zehir	2008	Obsidian Entertainment	Atari
Neverwinter Nights: Hordes of the Underdark	2003	BioWare	Atari
Neverwinter Nights: Shadows of Undrentide	2003	BioWare	Atari
The New Adventures of the Time Machine	2000	Cryo Interactive	Cryo Interactive
New Tales from the Borderlands	2022	Gearbox Software	2K
New World Order	2003	Termite Games	Strategy First
New York Race	2001	Kalisto Entertainment	Wanadoo Edition
Nexuiz	2009	Alientrap	Alientrap
Nexus: The Jupiter Incident	2004	Mithis Entertainment	Vivendi Universal
Nexus: The Kingdom of the Winds	1996	NEXON Inc.	KRU Interactive
NFL Blitz	1997	Midway Games	Midway Games
NFL GameDay 99	1998	Red Zone Interactive	989 Sports
NFL Head Coach	2006	EA Tiburon	EA Sports
NHL 97	1996	EA Canada	EA Sports
NHL 98	1997	EA Canada	EA Sports
NHL 99	1998	EA Canada	EA Sports
NHL 2000	1999	EA Canada	EA Sports
NHL 2001	2000	EA Canada	EA Sports
NHL 2002	2001	EA Canada	EA Sports
NHL 2003	2002	EA Sports	EA Sports
NHL 2004	2003	EA Canada	EA Sports
NHL 2005	2004	EA Canada, HB Studios	EA Sports
NHL 06	2005	EA Canada, HB Studios	EA Sports
NHL 07	2006	EA Montreal	EA Sports
NHL 08	2007	HB Studios	EA Sports
NHL 09	2008	HB Studios	EA Sports
NHL Eastside Hockey Manager	2004	Sports Interactive	Sega
NHL Eastside Hockey Manager 2005	2005	Sports Interactive	Sega
NHL Eastside Hockey Manager 2007	2006	Sports Interactive	Sega
NHRA Drag Racing	1998	Tantrum Entertainment	Mind Magic Productions
NiBiRu: Age of Secrets	2005	Future Games	The Adventure Company
Nickelodeon All-Star Brawl	2021	Ludosity, Fair Play Labs	GameMill Entertainment
Nickelodeon Kart Racers 2: Grand Prix	2020	Bamtang Games	GameMill Entertainment
Nickelodeon Kart Racers 3: Slime Speedway	2022	Bamtang Games	GameMill Entertainment
Nickelodeon Party Blast	2002	Data Design Interactive	Infogrames Interactive
Nicktoons Racing	2000	Software Creations	Hasbro Interactive
Nicktoons Winners Cup Racing	2006	Pronto Games	ValuSoft
Night at the Museum: Battle of the Smithsonian	2009	Amaze Entertainment	Majesco
Night Shift Nurses	1999	Mink	Mink
Night Watch	2005	Nival Interactive	CDV Software
Nightfall: Escape	2016	Zeenoh, 7 Seals	Zeenoh
Nightlong: Union City Conspiracy	1998	Team17, Trecision	Balmoral Software
Nightmare Creatures	1997	Kalisto Entertainment	Activision
Nikopol: Secrets of the Immortals	2008	White Birds Productions	Got Game Entertainment
Ninja Blade	2009	FromSoftware	Iceberg Interactive, ND Games
Ninja Reflex	2008	Sanzaru Games	Nunchuck Games, Electronic Arts, Valve
Ninjabread Man	2005	Data Design Interactive	Data Design Interactive, Conspiracy Entertainment
Nioh	2017	Team Ninja	Koei Tecmo
Nioh 2	2021	Team Ninja	Koei Tecmo
Nitro Stunt Racing	2007	GameSeed	GameSeed
No Man's Land	2003	Related Designs	CDV Software
No Man's Sky	2016	Hello Games	Hello Games
No One Lives Forever 2: A Spy in H.A.R.M.'s Way	2002	Monolith Productions	Sierra Entertainment
No One Lives Under the Lighthouse	2020	Marevo Collective	Marevo Collective
Nobody Wants to Die	2024	Critical Hit Games	Plaion
Noctis	2000	Alessandro Ghignola	Self-published
Nocturnal Illusion	1995	Apricot	Excellents Japan, Jast
Nocturne	1999	Terminal Reality	Gathering of Developers
The Nomad Soul	1999	Quantic Dream	Eidos Interactive
Normality	2011	Gremlin Interactive	Interplay
Nosferatu: The Wrath of Malachi	2003	Idol FX	iGames Publishing
Nostradamus ni Kiite Miro	2008	Lime	Lime
Nostradamus: The Last Prophecy	2007	Kheops Studio, Mzone Studio, TOTM Studio	Elektrogames, Kheops Studio, Mzone Studio, TOTM Studio, MC2, Encore Games
NotGTAV	2014	NotGames	NotGames
Nox	2000	Westwood Studios	Electronic Arts
Nubby's Number Factory	2025	MogDogBlog Productions	MogDogBlog Productions
Numen: Contest of Heroes	2010	Cinemax	Cinemax
