= NHL Eastside Hockey Manager =

2004 video game

- Developer: Sports Interactive
- Publisher: Sega
- Platform: Microsoft Windows
- Release: EU: September 2004; NA: October 19, 2004
- Genres: Sports, ice hockey
- Modes: Single-player, multiplayer

NHL Eastside Hockey Manager is an ice hockey management simulation game developed by Sports Interactive (SI Games) and published by Sega. It was the first commercial release in the Eastside Hockey Manager series started by the freeware game Eastside Hockey Manager.

The first version of the game was released in Europe in 2004 under the new brand name NHL Eastside Hockey Manager. It was based on Sports Interactive's Championship Manager 3 game engine and featured over 15 playable hockey leagues from around the world with a database of over 15,000 players and staff. The game was first released in stores only in Europe but was also available to be downloaded and bought online. A North American retail release of the game followed later in the year.

On January 30, 2007 it was announced that NHL Eastside Hockey Manager 2007 would be the final version of the game for the foreseeable future, with Sports Interactive blaming piracy for the decision, and a lack of advertising, which most feel is the true reason for the poor sales figures.

While no hockey management game has existed since the demise of NHL Eastside Hockey Manager series, OOTP Developments, the developers of the management sim Out of the Park Baseball, announced in late 2011 that they were developing a hockey management sim to be released in late 2012.

The EHM series was resurrected on 16 March 2015, with the release of Eastside Hockey Manager 1.

== Reception ==
Reception

Aggregate scores
Aggregator	Score
GameRankings	75.18%
Metacritic	77/100

Review scores
Publication	Score
Computer Gaming World	4/5
Computer and Video Games	73%
GamesMaster	74%
GameSpot	8.4/10
GameSpy	4/5
GamesTM	6/10
PC Format	74%
PC Gamer (UK)	74%
PC Gamer (US)	80%
PC Zone	68%

The game was met with positive reception upon release, as GameRankings gave it a score of 75.18%, while Metacritic gave it 77 out of 100.

== See also ==
- Eastside Hockey Manager - For information on the original freeware game.
- NHL Eastside Hockey Manager 2005 - The sequel to this game.
- NHL Eastside Hockey Manager 2007 - The sequel to the 2005 game.
- Eastside Hockey Manager 1 - The newest version of the game, released in 2015.
- Eastside Hockey Manager series - The whole hockey management game series.
