= EHM =

EHM may refer to:

== People ==
- Erica Ehm (born 1961), Canadian writer and television personality
- Henrik Ehm (died 1701), Danish coppersmith and alchemist
- Lars Ehm (born 1976), German politician
- Marcus Ehm, German paralympic athlete
- Wilhelm Ehm (1918–2009), a German World War II naval officer and East German politician
- Ehm Welk (1884–1966), German writer and educator

== Other uses ==
- Cape Newenham LRRS Airport, in Alaska
- Eastside Hockey Manager, a video game series
  - Eastside Hockey Manager (video game), a 2015 video game
- Erotic Heritage Museum, in Las Vegas, Nevada
- Extreme Home Makeover, an American television series
