= Brede Works =

Historical industrial complex in Denmark

Coordinates: 55°47′41″N 12°29′57″E

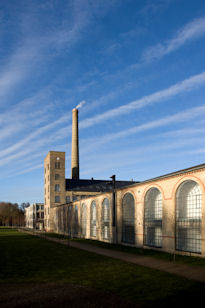
Brede Works seen from the garden

The National Museum of Denmark's new museum, Brede Works, lies in the countryside just north of Copenhagen in Denmark's largest, protected industrial plants. At the museum of Industrial culture, the visitors can be guided around by its own virtual person between old machines, hear how Denmark became an industrial society and even try to work at an assembly line. The exhibitions show the industrial development which has changed the everyday lives of the Danes over the past few centuries.

Along the millstream Mølleåen there have been watermills since the Middle Ages. Over time they have helped to process copper, grain, gunpowder etc. From 1832 until it was closed down in 1956 textiles were produced at Brede Works. The historic industrial plant Brede Works gives an impression of a tightly knit factory community with production buildings, workers' and master-craftsmen's homes, the factory-owner's country home, an 'eating house', a day-nursery for the children, a plant nursery and park. Today the buildings house the museum and the National Museum of Denmark's Conservation Department.

== History ==
=== Early history ===
Brede Watermill is already mentioned as a grain mill in the 14th century. Ot was converted into a gunpowder mill in 1628,

=== The copper mill ===
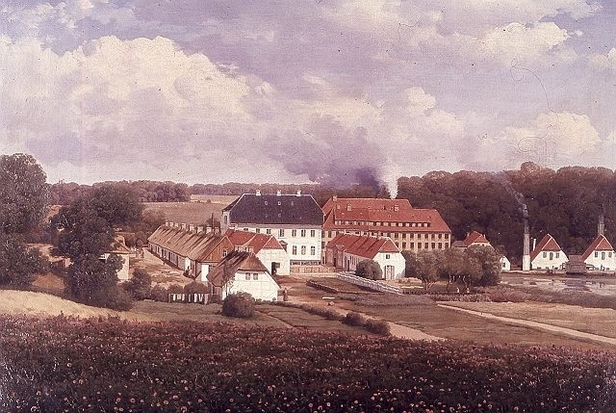
Brede Works

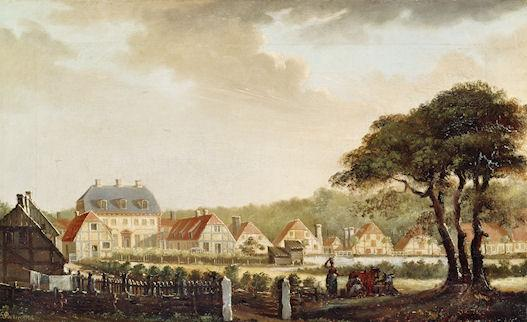
Brede Works, 1798

Henrik Ehm, the owner of Hammermøllen at Helsingør, acquired Brede Works from Henrik Rosenmeyer's heirs in 1668. He also acquired Fuglevad Watermill, Stenhuggergården. He converted it into a copper mill.

Ludvig Manthey, who had until then owned The Lion Pharmacy in Copenhagen, served as manager of Brede Works and Ørholm from 1805 to 1811.

=== Brede Textile Factory ===
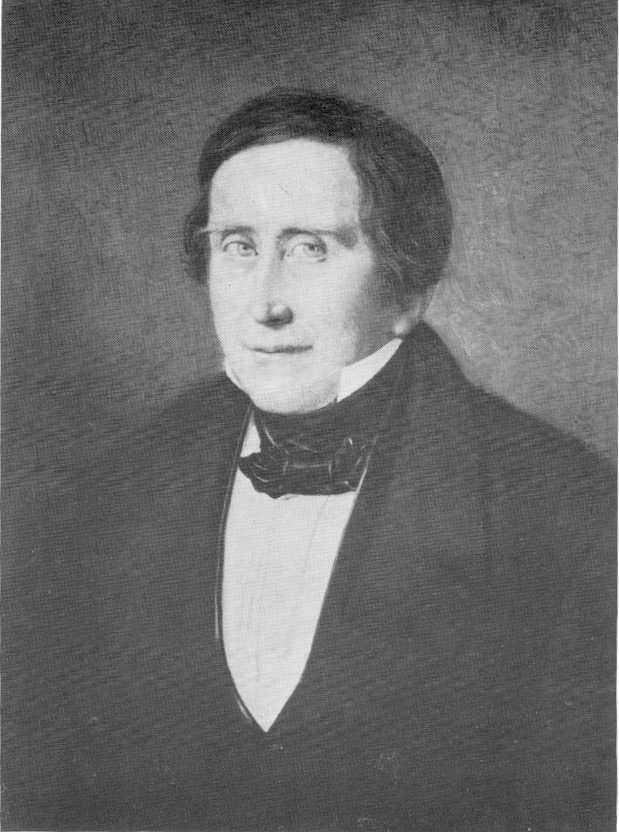
Johan Carl Modeweg

Johan Carl Modeweg established a textile factory in Copenhagen in 1809, after he had accidentally become the owner of a couple of handlooms. The number of weaves had ten years later grown to 16. He had by 1832 run out of space at his old address and therefore decided to move his operations out to the hydropower at Brede Works. He bought the complex in a partnership with other investors but became its sole owner in 1835.

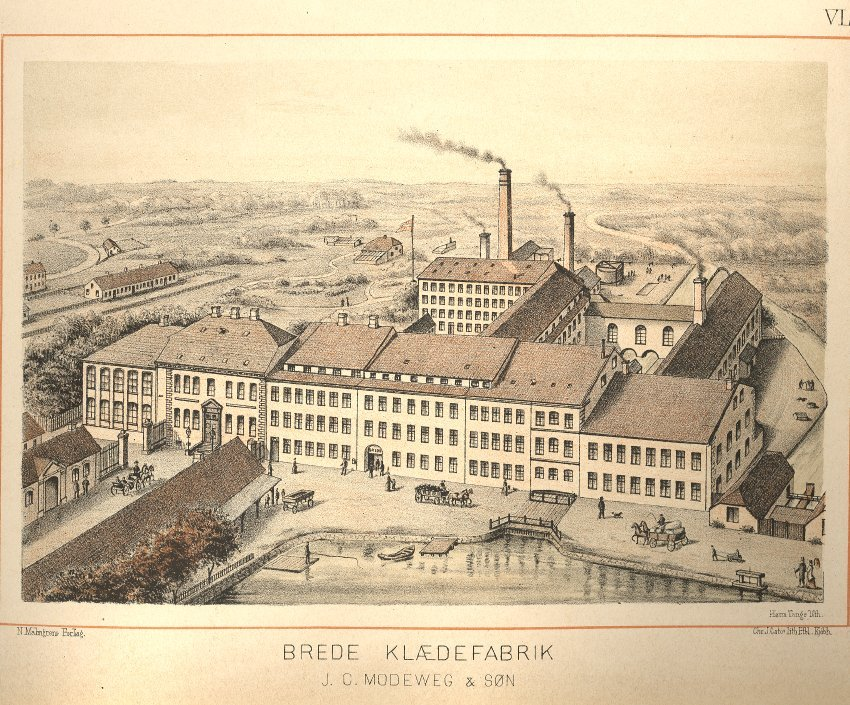
Brede Textile Factory, c. 1888

Modeweg passed's son J.E. Modeweg (1813–1869) became a partner in the company in 1849 and became its sole owner following his father's death in 1849. His widow continued the operations for a few years after his death but sold it in 1872 to Carl Albeck (1830–1905) and William Salomonsen (1842–1900). Albeck sold his share of the company to Salomonsen in 1879. Edmund Daverkosen (1854–1918) became a partner in 1887 while Carl C. Jensen (1853–1922) became an associés. 300 workers worked at the factory by 1888. The company was in 1895 converted into a limited company (aktieselskab)) with Daverkosen and Jensen as managing directors. The factory closed in 1956.

=== Later history ===
The buildings were taken over by the National Museum of Denmark in the 1960s.

== Museum exhibitions ==
The exhibition Industrial Society tells the daily history of the ordinary Dane towards the modern society and the importance of the industrial products for everyday life by using things from the time, sound, light and movie clips.

At the Factory you can experience the greatest female job of the 1800s which was the cloth mill with big machines and Dyeing.

In the exhibition The Machinery the visitors can work together along two assembly lines, which can produce ball bearings to the world market.

The exhibition Industrial beginnings show the story of the factories and the small communities along the millstream, Mølleåen. Brede Works produced gunpowder, copper and textiles. Around 1900 the textile factory had grown to a small community with homes, a crèche, school, shop and dining house.

The last exhibitions Dressed in Time show the history of fashion from top to toe. Almost 200 garments show how the Danes have looked on everyday and festive occasions from the 1700s to the present day.

A Virtual Experience at the Museum

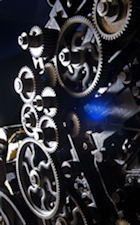
Machine at Brede Works

Each visitor is given an ActiveTicket, which tell the story of working life at the cloth mill, the growth of industrial society and the welfare state through new technology. The visitor can choose a virtual guide who will appear among the machines and tell about the working day.

== See also ==
- Usserød Textile Factory
- J.C. Modeweg & Søn
