= Nyhavn 61 =

Listed buildings in Copenhagen

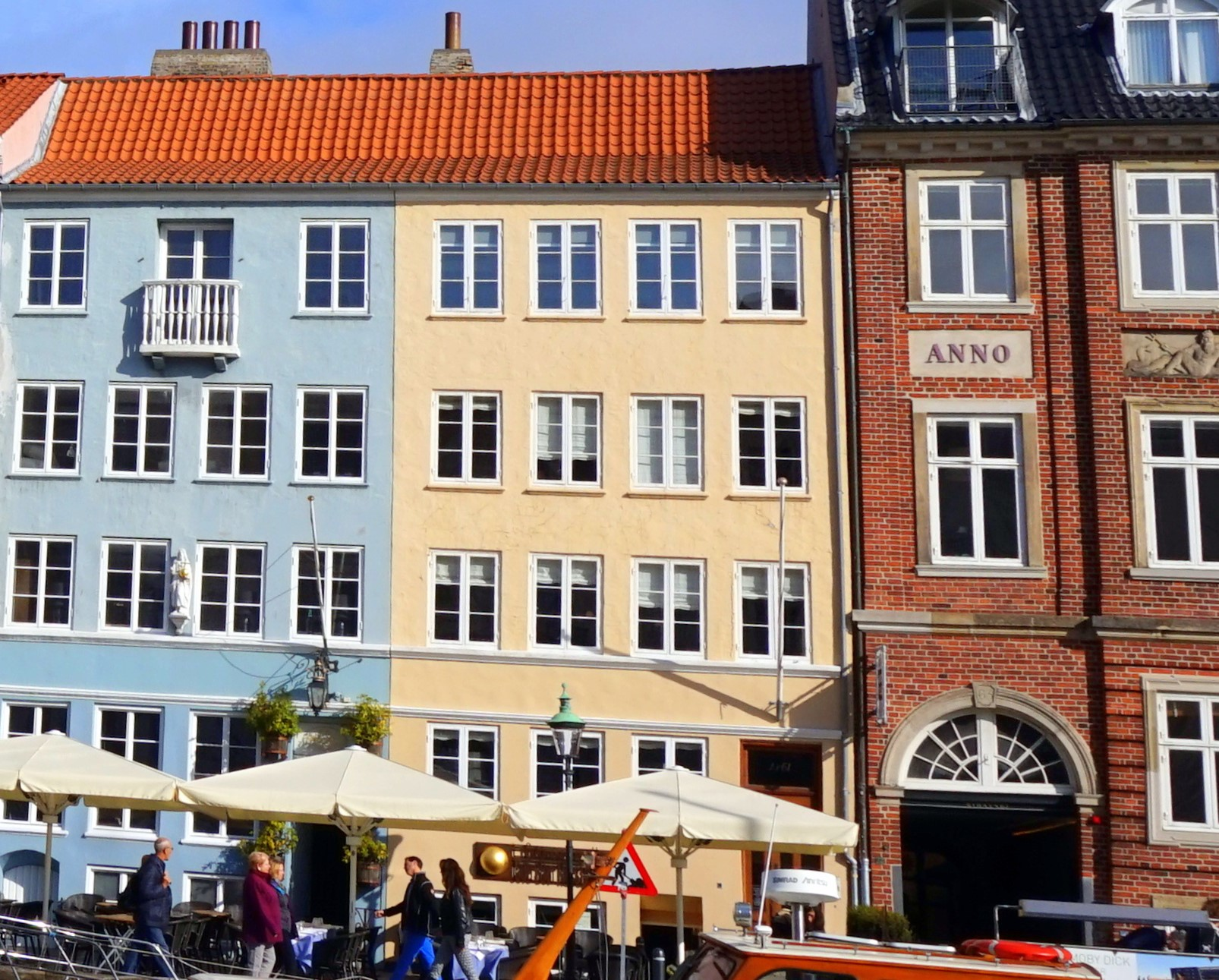
- Interactive map of the Nyhavn 61 area

General information
- Location: Copenhagen, Denmark, Denmark
- Coordinates: 55°40′46.74″N 12°35′32.64″E
- Completed: 18th century

Nyhavn 61 is an 18th-century residential building overlooking the Nyhavn canal in central Copenhagen, Denmark. The building was listed in the Danish registry of protected buildings and places in 1945. The scope of the heritage listing was expanded in 1984. Nyhavn 61 and Nyhavn 59 have now been merged into a single property and are physically integrated on the third floor. The two buildings share a central courtyard.

== History ==
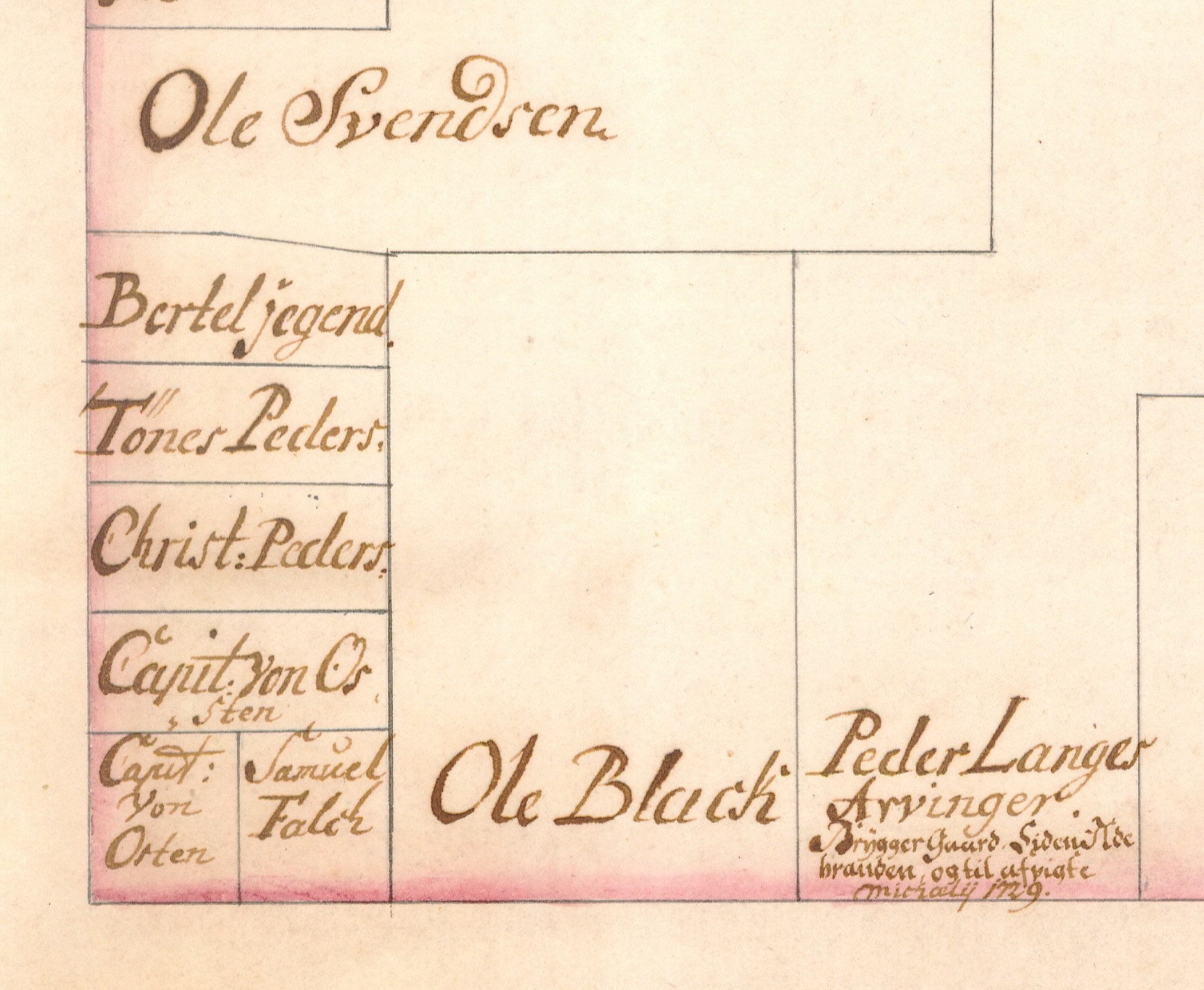
Ole Olsen's property seen on a plan from 1731

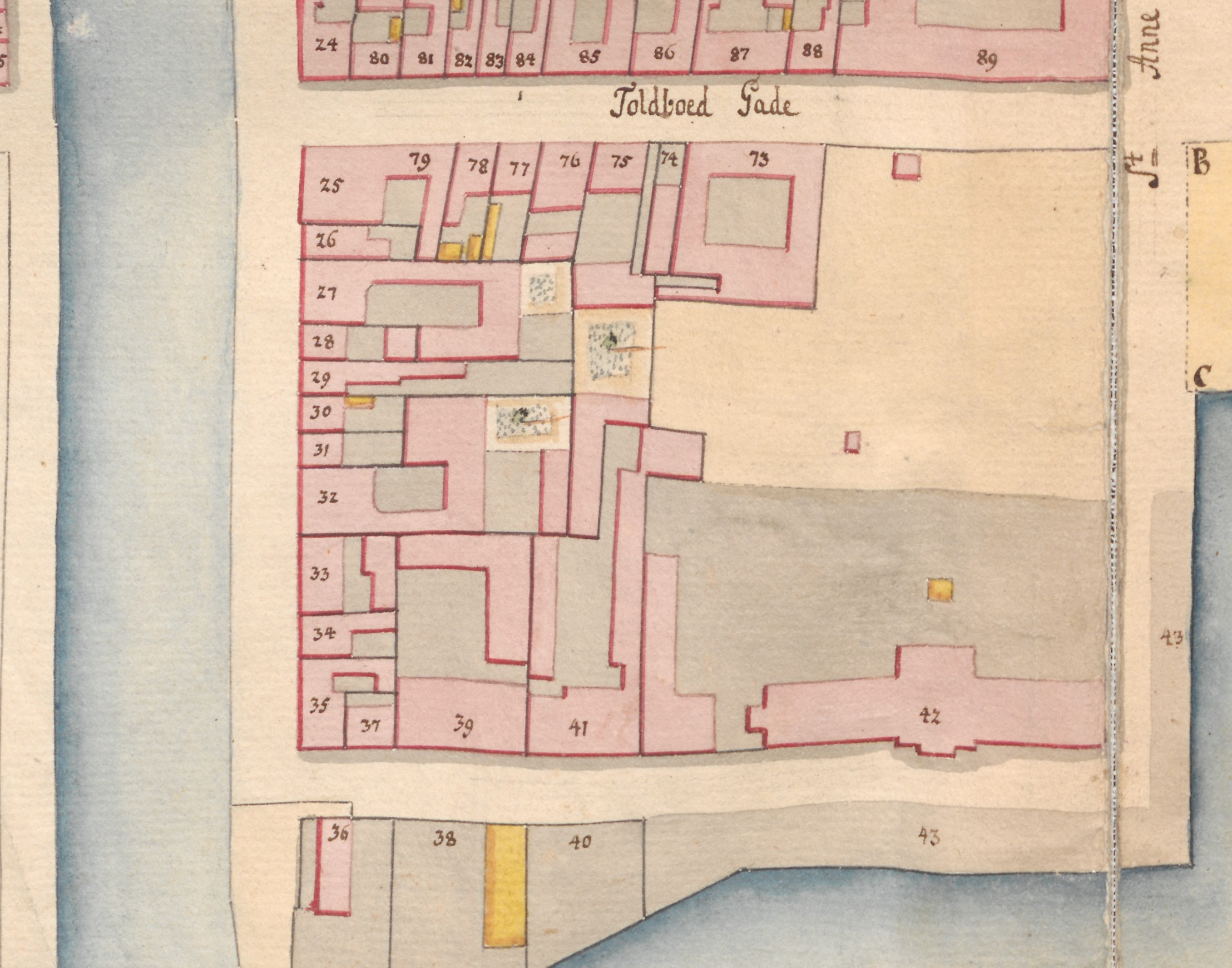
No. 31 seen in a detail from Christian Gedde's map of St. Ann's Rast Quarter, 1757

The coppersmith Henrik Ehm purchased a large property at the site in 1682, comprising all the properties now known as Nyhavn59–69 and Kvæsthusgade 2–4. His property was listed in Copenhagen's first cadastre of 1689 as No. 20 in St. Ann's East Quarter.

The building now known as Nyhavn 61 was constructed for Ehm as a tenement house in around 1700. It was then a five-bay-wide, half-timbered building with a facade crowned by a two-bay-wide gabled wall dormer. The facade was reconstructed in brick some time between 1715 and 1748.

The property was later divided into a number of smaller properties. The property now known as Nyhavn 61 belonged to skipper Ole Olsen from at least 1731. It was listed in the new cadastre of 1756 as No. 31 in St. Ann's East Quarter and was still owned by skipper Ole Olsen at that time.

The building was heightened with one storey and a mansard roof in 1778. The property was later acquired by skipper Henning Peter Bohn. He resided in the building with his wife Margaretha Ips Datter, their seven children (aged three to 13), one maid and one lodger (another skipper) at the time of the 1787 census.

=== Peder Hansen Bistrup ===
The property was later acquired by skipper Peder Hansen Bistrup (died 1841). He was originally from Rønne on Bornholm. His property was home to 19 residents in three households at the time of the 1801 census. Peder Hansen Bistrup resided in the building with his wife Rebecca Jonasdatter (died 1834), their seven children (aged three to 19) and one maid. Hans Jensen Giese, third skipper, resided in the building with his wife Anne Kirstine Jessen, their four children (aged one to 12), his brother Peter Jensen Giese (skipper, away at the moment) and one maid. Christian Nielsen, a third skipper, resided on his own in a third apartment (but was away).

Bistrup's apartment was again listed as No. 31 in the new cadastre of 1806.

The now 87-year-old Peter Hansen Bistrup was still residing on the first floor at the time of the 1840 census. He lived there with his son Peter Frederik Bistrup (1781–1851) and daughter-in-law Caroline Bistrup (née Stålhammar Carlson, 1809–1891), their three children (aged 14 to 23) and one maid. Asmus Andersen Kruse, another skipper (of the sloop Ane Maria, c. 1825-1831, sailing Copenhagen–Amsterdam), resided on the ground floor with his wife Ulrikke Magrethe Kruse and their 16-year-old daughter Marie Magrete Kruse. Sophie Hedevig Olsen, a widow, resided on the second floor with one lodger. Andreas Madsen, a coachman, resided in the basement with his wife Engeborg Madsen and six children (aged two to 14).

=== 1850 census ===
The property was home to 22 residents in four households at the 1850 census. Christian Sørensen, a 60-year-old man, resided on the first floor with one maid and three lodgers. Hans Christian Hansen, a typographer, resided on the second floor with his wife H. Frederikke, their daughter Wilhelmine Marie and the lodger Wilhelm Malling. Johan Frederik Sporlæder, a mate (styrmand), resided on the third floor with his wife Anne Christine, their two children (aged four and eight) and three lodgers. Lars Nielsen, a workman, resided in the basement with his wife Cathrine Emilie and their four children (aged one to eight).

=== 1860 census ===
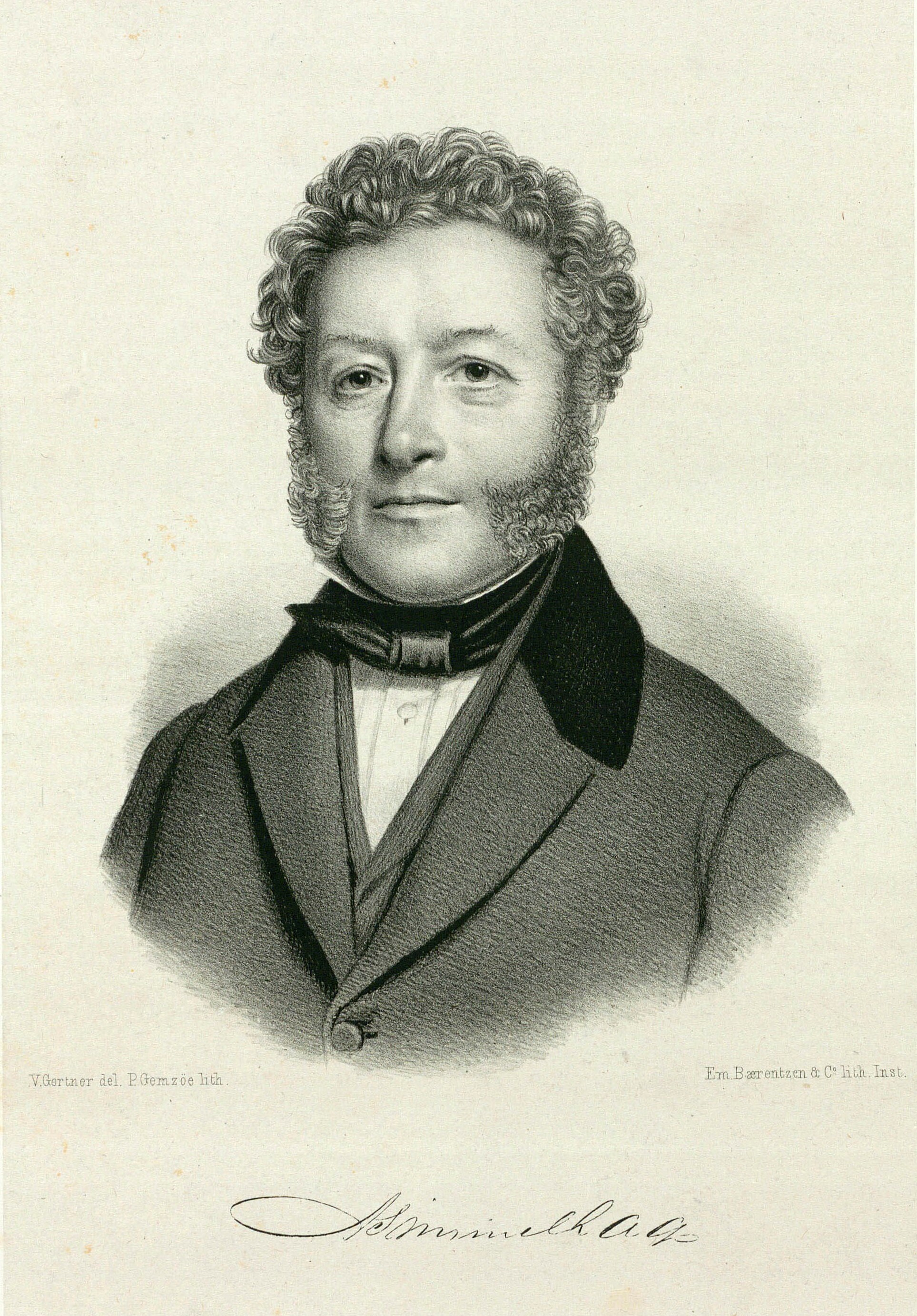
Andreas Simmelhag

The property was home to 29 residents in four households at the 1860 census. Anthon Gravengaard, a barkeeper, resided in the building with his wife Ingeborg Gravengaard (née Moe), their two children (aged three and 15), one male servant, one maid and three lodgers. Lars Hansen, another barkeeper, resided in the building with his wife Ane Magrethe Hansen and their 29-year-old son Lars Christian William Hansen. Theodor Ernst Petersen, an organist at the 11th Brigade, resided in the building with his wife Johanne Marie Petersen (née Rothe), their infant daughter and three maids. Andreas Simmelhag, a businessman (Vare og Vexelmægler), resided in the building with his seven children (aged seven to 27) and two maids.

=== 1880 census ===
The property was home to 12 residents at the 1880 census. Niels Nilsson, a hotelier, occupied the ground floor and first floor of the front wing and the second floor of the rear wing. He lived there with his wife Elna Nilsson (née Persson), their two sons (aged one and two), two maids and four lodgers. Ole Madsen Holm, a tailor, resided on the third floor of the front wing with his daughter Mathilda Olivia Holm.

=== Later history ===
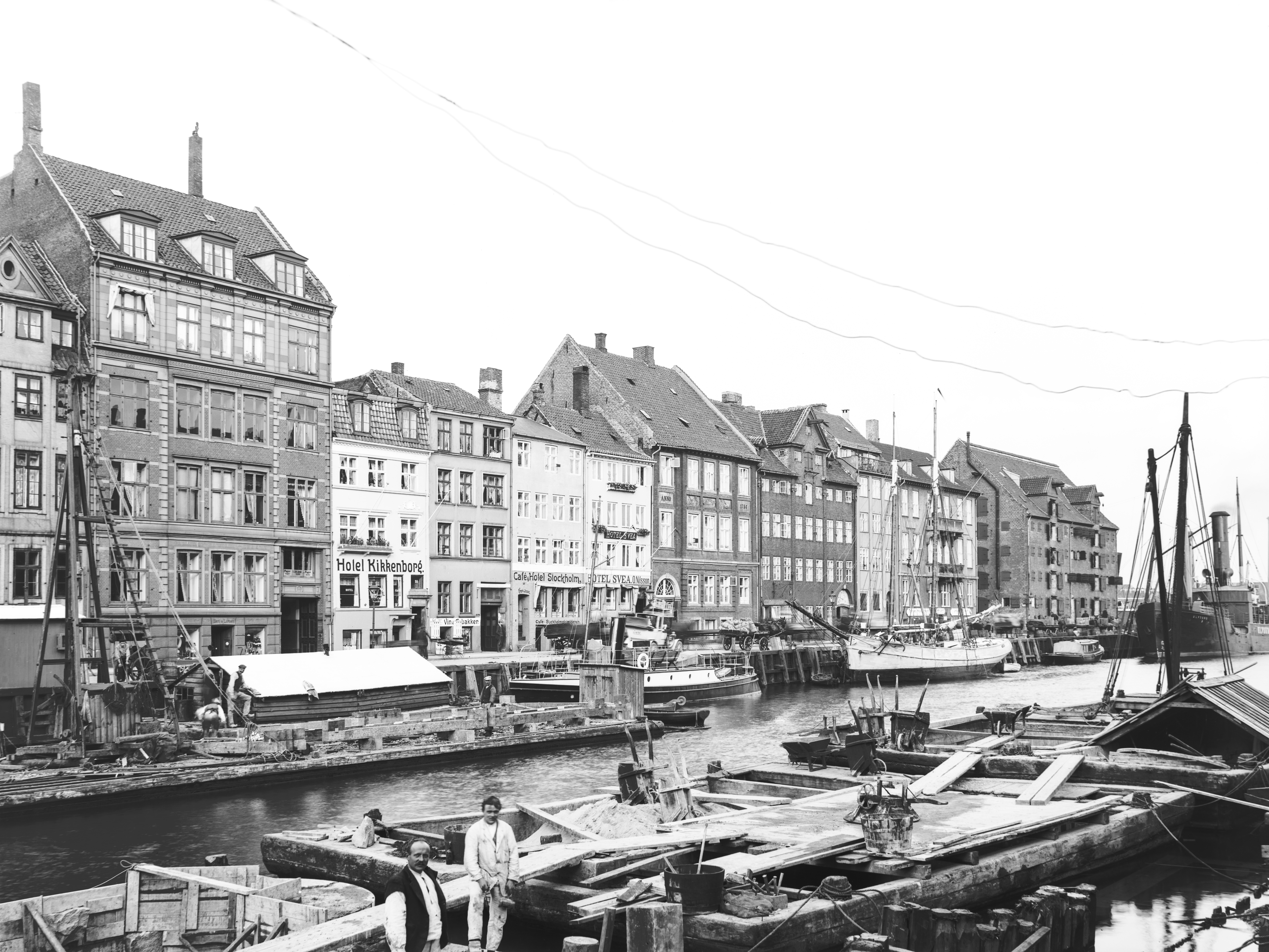
Hotel Swea (Nyhavn 61) seen in a photograph by Johannes Hauerslev

The property was owned by master tailor O.M. Holm in the 1770s and 1890s.

In 1902, C. O. Nielsen purchased the building. It was subsequently adapted for use as a hotel. It was operated under the name Hotel Swea. It was later operated under the name Hotel Dania by Hans Oscar Nielsen. In 1929, G.M. Nilsson purchased the building. In 1940, she integrated No. 61 and No. 59. The architect Mogens Black-Petersen merged the third floor of No. 61 and No. 59.

Oscar Kretzschmer (1899–), a businessman and manufacturer, purchased the property in 1970.

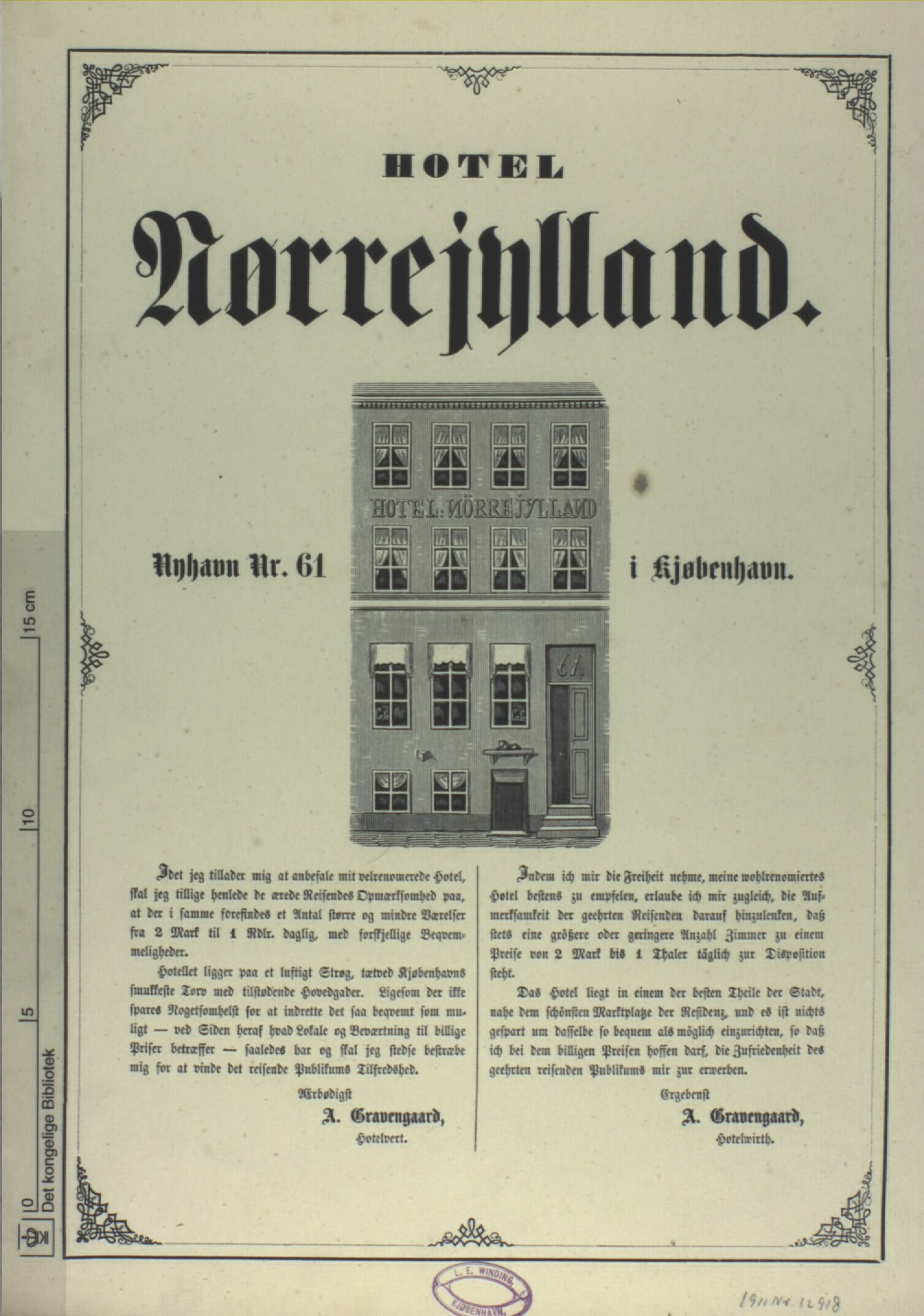
Hotel Nørrejylland

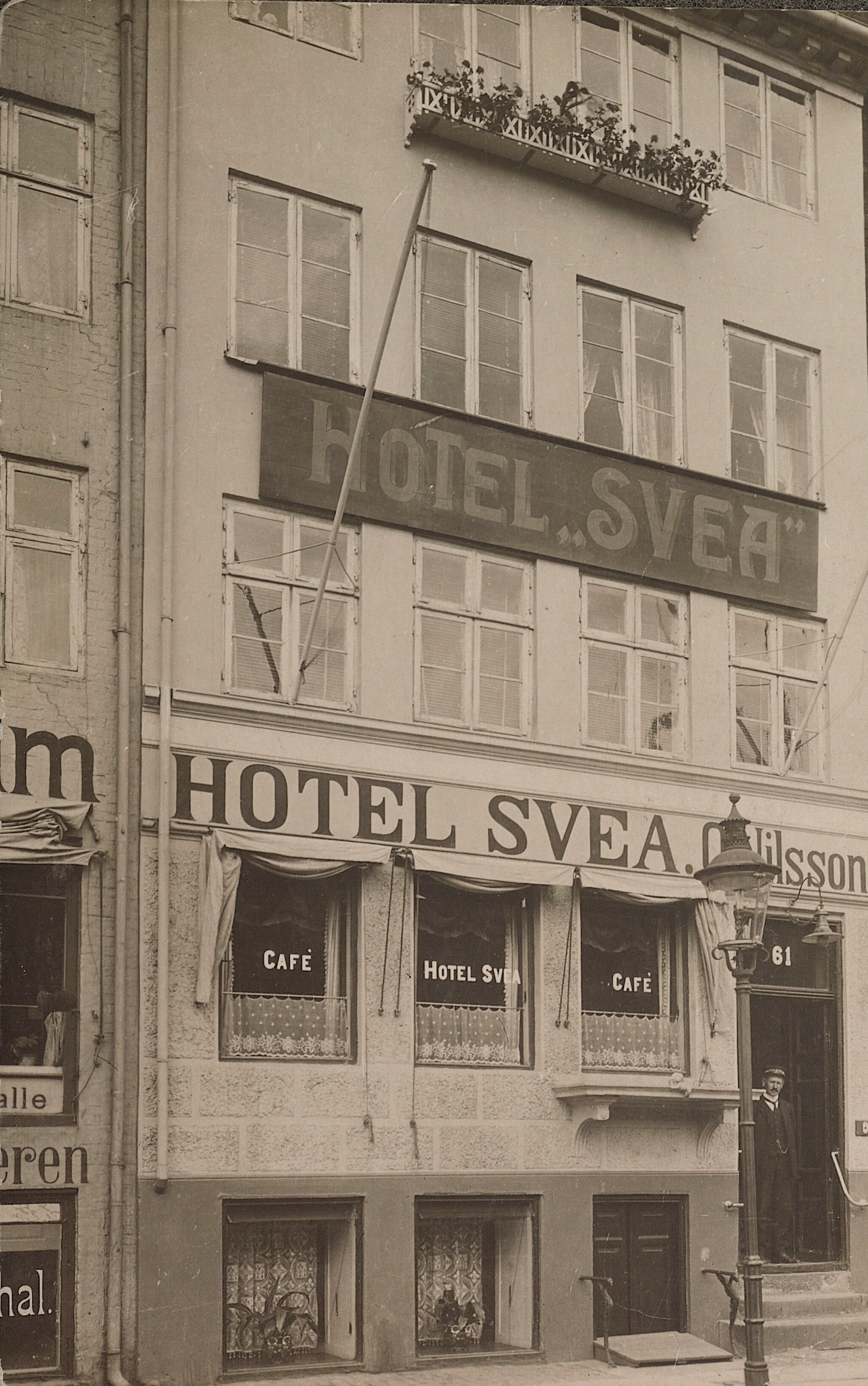
Hotel Swea

== Architecture ==
The building is constructed with four storeys over a walk-out basement and is just four bays wide. The plastered, yellow-painted facade is finished with a belt course above the ground floor, a sill course below the first-floor windows and a simple cornice below the roof. The main entrance is located in the bay furthest to the east. It is topped by a transom widow. The basement entrance next to it is flanked by cast iron railings shaped as griffons. The rear side of the building is constructed in undressed brick on the ground floor, followed by two storeys with red-painted timber framing and yellow-painted infills, and finally a mansard roof. A three-storey side wing extends from the rear side of the building and is itself attached to a two-storey rear wing. These two wings are both constructed in brick. They are both dressed and yellow-painted, with monopitched red tile roofs. The building shares a central courtyard with Nyhavn 59.

== Today ==
Nyhavn 59 is today owned by APS Kbus 17 Nr. 3421.
