= Palle Suenson =

Danish architect (1904–1987)

Palle Suenson (born 6 July 1904 in Frederiksberg and deceased on 14 July 1987 in Holte) was a Danish modernist architect. He was the son of Professor Edouard Suenson, engineer, and of Henriette Benedicte Hartmann.

== Biography ==
After studies at the Royal Danish Academy of Fine Arts in Copenhagen, he first worked with Kay Fisker and Søren Christian Larsen (1925–29) and Kaj Gottlob (1929–30) before starting an autonomous activity as architect in 1930. He rapidly established himself as a leading modernist architect in Denmark, a pioneer in this style, and is remembered today for numerous iconic buildings, such as the B&W building on Christianshavn. The buildings are reputed for their simplicity and proportions and exercised a major influence on the likes of Arne Jacobsen and Poul Kjaerholm.

In addition to his many buildings, consisting both in houses and offices for banks and others, as well as to the furniture he designed, he was keenly interested in the restoration of historic buildings. In 1943, he bought and restored the Alchemist's House (or Guldmagerens Hus) on Nyhavn in Copenhagen, and in 1950 he was in charge of restoring Schæffegården on Ermelundsvej in Gentofte.

Palle Suenson regularly participated in exhibitions such as Charlottenborg (1929, 1932, 1934, 1941, 1945, 1978), the World Exhibition in Brussels in 1935, as well as numerous exhibitions in cities such as The Hague, Paris or Lyon.

Suenson owned the Rygaard property in Søllerød, North of Copenhagen and established there the 220 hectare local natural park, at great cost for himself.

Suenson had also an important teaching activity and was from 1956 to 1965 the Rector of the Royal Danish Academy of Fine Arts in Copenhagen.

== Bibliography ==
- Palle Suenson, Weilbachs Kunstnerleksikon 1947 and 1994
- "Kunstindeks Danmark & Weilbachs kunstnerleksikon". kulturarv.dk.
- "Kraks Blå Bog - Wikipedia, den frie encyklopædi". da.wikipedia.org.
- Johan Casper and Peter Hancke Crone, Arkitekten Palle Suenson, Ed. C. Ejler, 1987, 350 pages
