= Johan Carl Modeweg =

Danish industrialist (1782 – 1849)

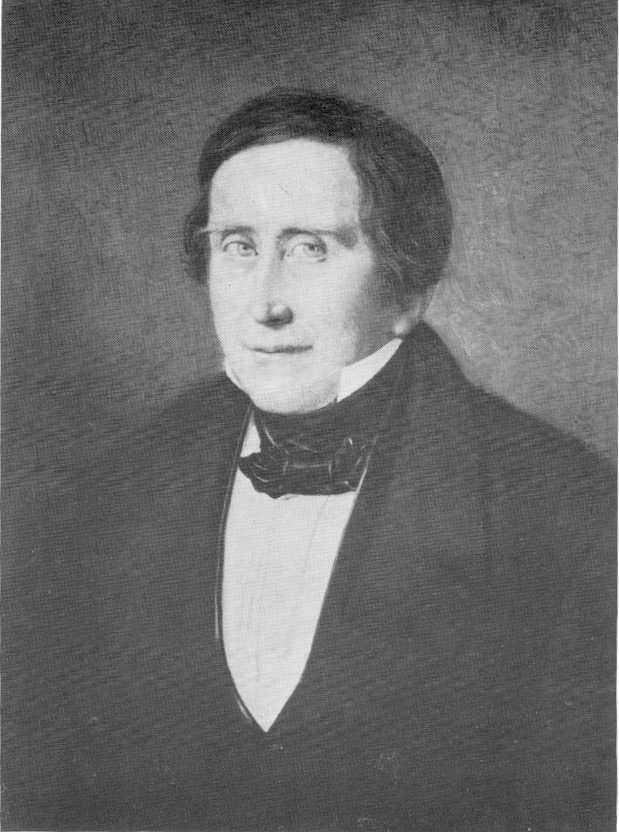
Johan Carl Modeweg (1782–1849)

Johan Carl Modeweg (25 March 1782 – 20 August 1849) was a Danish industrialist who founded the textile company J. C. Modeweg & Søn. From 1831 his company was based at Brede Works in Kongens Lyngby, north of Copenhagen.

== Early life and education ==
Modeweg was born on 25 March 1782 in Copenhagen, the son of clockmaker Tobias Modeweg (1757–1801) and Marie Sørensdatter (c. 1746–1818). His mother was first married to clockmaker Michael Peter Beck, c. 1744–80. His father was born in Magdeburg but came to Denmark by way of Sweden.

== Career ==
Modeweg established a grocery business in Copenhagen in 1804 or 1805 but had to close it after a few years. In 1809, after a bankrupt master tableclothmaker, he acquired nine handlooms. On 27 January 1810, he obtained a royal license to establish and operate a cloth factory in Copenhagen. His company prospered during the war with England and the Danish state bankruptcy in 1813. In early 1820, when a fire destroyed both his property, an interest-free loan enabled him to recover from his losses. The loan enabled him to import modern machinery and., on study trips abroad, he also studied the latest manufacturing methods.

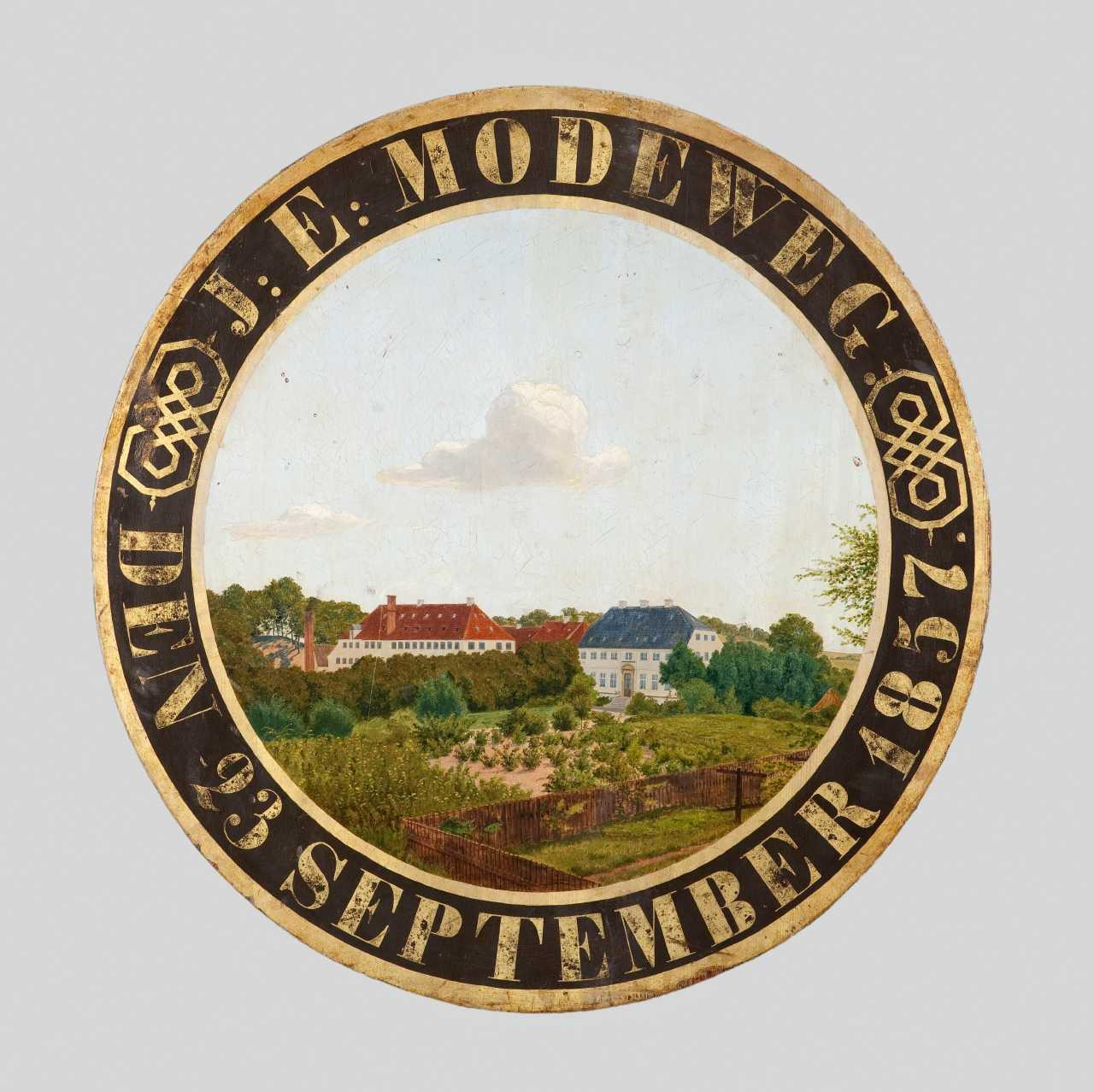
Brede Works depicted on Modeweg's membership target to the Royal Copenhagen Shooting Society

In 1811, together with Theodor Suhr, he was able to buy Brede Works from Ernst Schimmelmann's heirs, While Suhr continued to run the copper works for a time, Modeweg took over most of the land and established a modern textile factory in the grounds. The factory was initially operated by water power from Mølleåen. Later, a small steam engine was acquired.

In 1838, Modeweg made his son Julius Emil Modeweg (1813–69) a partner in the firm. Its name was subsequently changed to J. C. Modeweg & Søn.

== Personal life and legacy ==
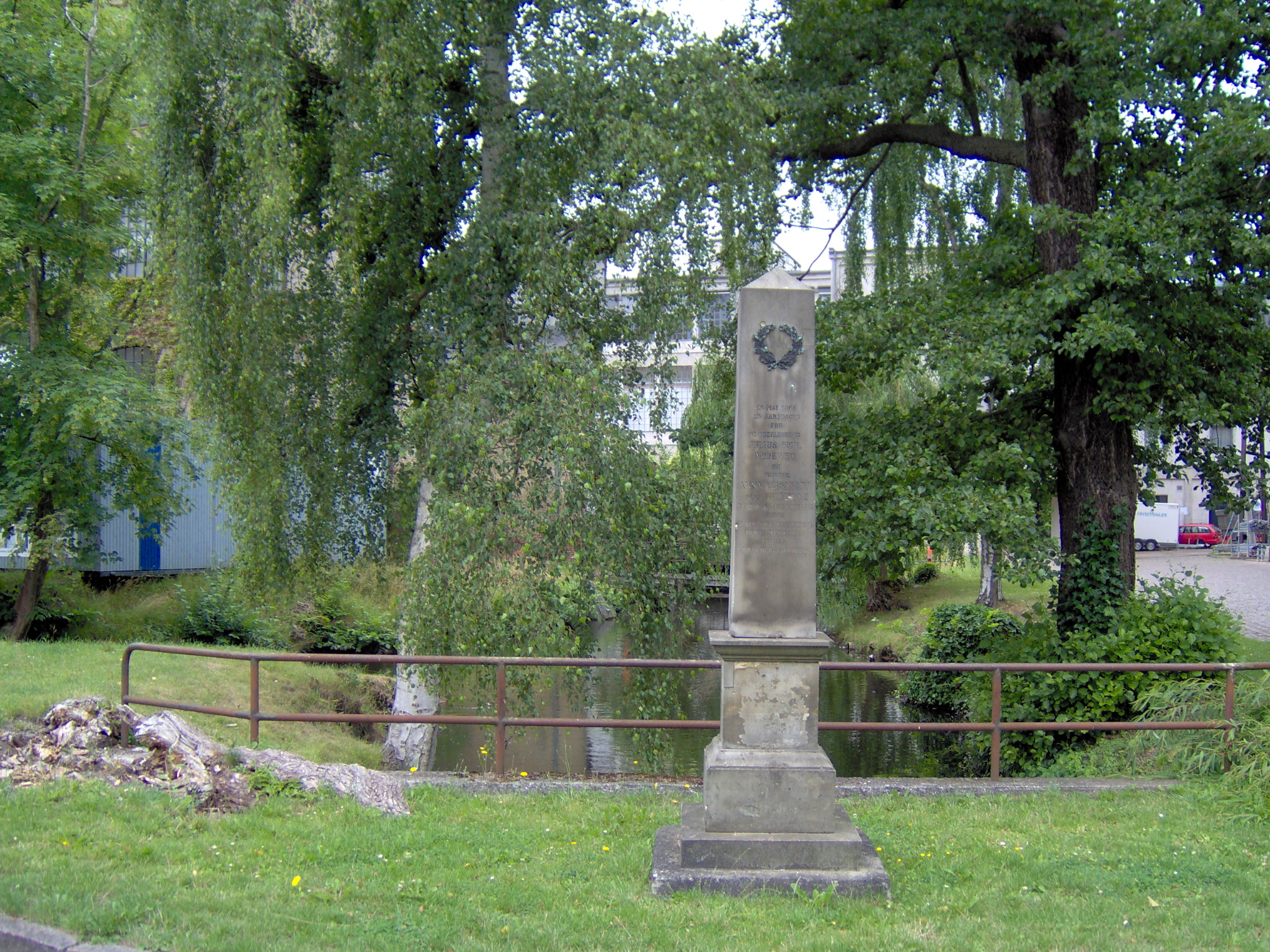
Monument to Modeweg and his wife at Brede Works in Lyngby

Modeweg was married on 2 September 1805 in Trinitatis Church to Marie Magdalene Louise Bock (1783–1843). She was the daughter of tobacco spinner Johan Carl Bock (1750–1805) and Frederikke Lovise Braad (ca. 1752–1786). After the death of his first wife, on 25 September 1844 in Lyngby he married Petrine Nicoline Tangen (1807–1880). She was the daughter of sailing master Hans Gullich Tangen and Johanne Elisabeth Franck.

Modeweg died on 20 August 1849. He is buried at Copenhagen's Assistens Cemetery.

The company was continued by Julius Modeweg. In 1844, he acquired the remaining part of Brede Works. His widow Anna Elisabeth, Modeweg (née Gudmann) sold the company in 1872 to the wholesalers Carl Albeck (1830–1905) and William Salomonsen (1842–1900).
