= NHL Eastside Hockey Manager 2007 =

2006 video game

- Developer(s): Sports Interactive
- Publisher(s): Sega
- Platform(s): PC, Mac
- Release: September 22, 2006
- Genre(s): Sports, ice hockey
- Mode(s): Single-player, multiplayer

NHL Eastside Hockey Manager 2007 (often abbreviated as NHL EHM 2007 or just EHM 2007) is an ice hockey management simulation game in the Eastside Hockey Manager series. It is developed by Sports Interactive (SI Games) and published by Sega. The game was released via digital download on September 22, 2006.

The game adds a number of features such as a fantasy draft and a new real-time 2D engine. Just like in NHL EHM 2005, many areas of the game, such as the interface, are upgraded based on the feedback received from the growing community around the game. The game database includes about 45,000 players and staff, 3,000 teams, and 20 playable leagues to choose from worldwide, including the NHL, AHL, QMJHL, WHL, OHL, German DEL, SHL, and Finnish SM-liiga.

While the game was received well among the fans, Sports Interactive decided not to develop new games in the series, blaming high piracy rates. In December 2015, however, Eastside Hockey Manager was released. In the meanwhile, the fans kept updating the game with modifications.
