= Henrik Ehm =

Danish coppersmith and alchemist

Henrik Ehm (died December 1701) was a Danish coppersmith and alchemist. He owned and leased a number of copper mills in North Zealand, including Hammermøllen at Hellebæk and Brede Works, Fuglevad and Nymølle on Mølleåen. He also owned a number of properties in Copenhagen, including the house at Nyhavn 59 which is still known as the Alchemist's House after him.

== Biography ==
Henrik Ehm is first mentioned in 1655. In 1656 and 1657, his father operated a coppermill at Vedbæk from at least 1634 and was granted a piece of land in the area in 1646. In 1656–1657, Ehm was involved in a legal dispute with his mother and Dr. Svabe over the right to the coppermill. In 1658, he was awarded the right to use the mill and became owner in 1662. In 1656 he also acquired the royal coppermill at Kronborg which he exchanged for Hammermøllen at Hellebæk in 1659. He owned Hammermøllen until 1664 as well as Holmegård at Hornbæk until 1662. After that he concentrated on the mill at Vedbæk for a few years.

In 1667 he unsuccessfully tried to acquire the right to Strandmøllen but in 1668 acquired Fuflevad Watermill, Stenhuggergården and purchased Brede Works from Henrik Rosenmeyer's heirs. He was licensed to convert the former gunpowder mill at Brede to a coppermill. In 1670, he was entrusted with the management of Queen Charlotte Amalie's coppermill at Hjortholm which had previously belonged to royal treasurer Henrik Müller, Ehm found the operations unsatisfactory and therefore moved the activities to Nymølle which he leased in 1672 and again in 1697-99.

Fuglevad Watermill passed out of Ehm's ownership before 1682. He sold Stenhuggergården in 1795 and Brede in 1695. In 1667-69, he was responsible for the copper roof on the new Royal Library and was also active at Frederiksborg Castle. He was involved in disputes with the coppersmiths' guild in Copenhagen but was favoured by the king in 1666 and 1684. He operated a workshop in Lyngby where he was also licensed to run an inn from 1670.

Ehm owned a house in Østergade in Copenhagen in 1659. He became a wealthy man in the 1660s, both from his engagements with the king, trade, privateering during the Swedish Wars and real estate speculation. He was the owner of several large properties in Copenhagen in 1689. That same year he was awarded 10 years tax exemption on his lot in Nyhavn where he intended to build a house.

He became a member of Kommercekollegiet in 1682. He lost his fortune as a result of his leasing of the queen's mill, unsuccessful speculation and his interest in alchemy. He died in Hamburg in December 1701.
