= Nosferatu: The Wrath of Malachi =

2003 video game

- Developer: Idol FX
- Publishers: NA: iGames Publishing; EU: Mindscape
- Platform: Microsoft Windows
- Release: NA: October 21, 2003; EU: May 14, 2004
- Genres: First-person shooter, Horror
- Mode: Single player

Nosferatu: The Wrath of Malachi is a survival horror first-person shooter video game developed by Swedish video game developer Idol FX, released in 2003 by iGames Publishing and Mindscape.

== Gameplay ==
Nosferatu: The Wrath of Malachi is a horror first person action game. The player's starting weapons are his fists and his silver cane sword, though weapons such as a flintlock pistol, flintlock musket, and a Webley Revolver, among others, become available later in the game. The objective of the game is to search the castle and save members of the protagonist's family within a one and a half hour time limit. These relatives will die if not rescued soon enough so the player has to hurry. The castle's interiors are randomly generated at the beginning of a new game.

== Plot ==
The plot is a version of Bram Stoker's Dracula, with inspiration from F.W. Murnau's Nosferatu and John William Polidori's The Vampyre. The protagonist, James Patterson, is travelling in Transylvania after losing in the Olympic fencing event being held in Sweden. James is on his way to the wedding of his sister, Rebecca, at Castle Malachi, where she is to be wed to the son of the wealthy Romanian Count. The Pattersons are a poor, but proud, aristocratic family of the British nobility.

When James arrives at the castle, something seems wrong, as there are crosses nailed to the castle's door. After entering the castle, he finds Father Aville, a friend of the Pattersons, and he tells James that his future brother-in-law is a vampire, his family members are being held prisoner, and the Count has intentions to use Rebecca as a virgin sacrifice to release Lord Malachi. Father Aville has several volumes of an "Encyclopedia of the Undead", that James can optionally collect throughout the game. James must fight his way through hellish demons and vampires that guard his friends and family as quick as he can. If James does not locate and rescue certain family members in time, they will be sacrificed, one by one; the more allies James fails to save, the stronger Lord Malachi will become.

Regardless of how many people James rescues, he is unable to prevent the Count from sacrificing Rebecca. After a struggle that ends with the Count being destroyed by sunlight, James battles and defeats the newly summoned Lord Malachi. Although James is left distraught over the death of his sister, the closing narration states he proved himself to be a true hero.

== Reception ==
Reception

Aggregate score
Aggregator	Score
Metacritic	70/100

Review scores
Publication	Score
Computer Games Magazine	3.5/5
Computer Gaming World	1.5/5
Game Informer	3/10
GameSpot	7.5/10
GameSpy	3/5
GameZone	8/10
IGN	6.8/10
PC Format	69%
PC Gamer (US)	76%
X-Play	3/5

The game received "mixed or average reviews" according to the review aggregation website Metacritic. GameSpot said, "The developer might not have created the most technically sound action-oriented horror game out there, but it has provided outstanding thrills and chills."
