= NHRA Drag Racing =

1998 video game

- Developer: Tantrum Entertainment
- Publisher: Mind Magic Productions
- Platform: Windows
- Release: June 30, 1998

NHRA Drag Racing is a 1998 video game from Mind Magic Productions. The game was sanctioned by the National Hot Rod Association

== Gameplay ==
NHRA Drag Racing is a PC drag racing simulator which supports single-player mode and simulates the high-speed world of drag racing, featuring two types of cars: funny cars and top-fuel dragsters. Gameplay features burnout, launch, maintain control, and deploy parachutes at the finish. While the track is a simple straight line, the challenge lies in managing the car's power and traction. Visually, the game includes smoke and flame effects, and it offers four camera views. The sound design is recorded from real races. Players can select cars, sponsors, and crew chiefs, each with unique tuning styles. Tuning options include adjustments for environmental conditions and engine settings. Modes include test drives, single races, and tournaments with financial management elements.

== Development ==
The game was developed by Tantrum Entertainment, a company founded in 1996. The title was in development as early as September 1997 and was originally scheduled to release in May 1998. NHRA drag racing stars Ron Capps and Whit Bazemore helped beta-test the game which was publicly displayed at the May Fram Route 66 Nationals.

== Reception ==
Reception

Review scores
| Publication | Score |
|---|---|
| All Game Guide | 2.5/5 |
| Computer Games Magazine | 3/5 |
| GameSpot | 5.7/10 |
| Hyper | 64//100 |
| PC PowerPlay | 68% |
| PC Gamer | 70% |

Hyper gave the game a score of 64 out of 100, stating: "Drag racing fans probably wouldn't be disappointed and would probably boost the gameplay mark, but a racing title without handling will wear thin fast with any other gamers"
