= Nubby's Number Factory =

2025 video game

- Developer: MogDogBlog Productions
- Publisher: MogDogBlog Productions
- Platforms: Microsoft Windows, iOS, Android
- Release: March 7, 2025
- Genres: Roguelike, strategy
- Mode: Single-player

Nubby's Number Factory is a 2025 plinko style roguelike strategy game created by developer MogDogBlog Productions.

== Gameplay ==
Gameplay screenshot.

In the game, players control a factory where they are tasked to launch Nubby, a living ball, into a board of pegs to generate higher and higher numbers continuously.

The pegs are worth different amounts in increasing multiples of two, and halve when they are hit, or 'popped', by Nubby. The player must earn enough points to meet the quota for each round, and earning multiples of the quota replenishes additional lives and causes the board to be restocked multiple times, increasing the values of the pegs.

Items can be purchased from the shop that appears in between sets of rounds, which have abilities such as popping pegs, doubling pegs, and increasing your score. There is also a food shop where you can purchase various one-off boosts, accessible from the normal shop menu once you have purchased the 3 additional item slots, a claw machine minigame, and a black market which grants special 'corrupted' items with more powerful effects.

The player wins money if they exceed the quota and fill up the vial. The game also features a perk system and special rounds to diversify runs.

Upon achieving certain thresholds players gain stars which, are spent to unlock Tonys, which are essentially slight variants to normal play acting similar to different decks in Balatro. Stars can also be spent to unlock cosmetics for Nubby and items. Other cosmetics can also be gained through achievements and the Nubby Trials. The cosmetics, achievements, and Nubby Trials were added in update 1.4 for the game, with the Nubby Trials being a normal run with trials during certain round thresholds.

== Release and reception ==
Nubby's Number Factory released on Steam on March 7, 2025 and April 15, 2026 on Mobile in IOS and Android. The game received positive reviews, with reviewers drawing favorable comparisons to Balatro, Peggle, and Ballionaire. Reviewers also compliment its price, music, absurd setting and terminology, paired with a bizarre art style inspired by 1990s computer shareware and edutainment. The style of progression and addictive gameplay elements are main points of enjoyment for reviewers. The game has not gone without criticism, with reviewers criticizing some of the balancing, lack of replay value, and the difficulty of the challenges.
