= Neocron =

2002 video game

- Neocron box artwork
- Developer: Reakktor Media GmbH
- Publisher: CDV Software
- Director: Martin J. Schwiezer
- Composers: Max Corbacho; Steve Roach; Ian Boddy
- Platform: Microsoft Windows
- Release: September 9, 2002: DEU: 2002-09-09; UK: 2002-10-30; US: 2002-11-12; FRA: 2003-01-30; AU: 2003-12-20
- Genre: MMORPG

Neocron is a 2002 post-apocalyptic cyberpunk massively multiplayer online role playing game (MMORPG) developed by Reakktor Media GmbH (based in Hannover, Germany) and published by cdv Software Entertainment. It is considered to be the first cyberpunk-genre MMORPG, and is designed to integrate elements of first-person shooter games. It has been called a MMO first-person shooter (MMOFPS), but most consider it a hybrid of MMORPG and first-person shooter.

== History ==
Although Neocron is often said to be the first MMOFPS, WWII Online, released in 2001, holds the Guinness World Record as the first MMOFPS.

Its 2004 sequel, Neocron 2: Beyond Dome of York, was originally slated to be an expansion pack and released separately under a new publisher, 10tacle Studios AG. Following a brief transitional period where Neocron players were encouraged to transfer their characters to Neocron 2, the Neocron servers were closed while the Neocron 2 servers continue to run to this day.

In 2016, an updated version of Neocron, renamed Neocron Evolution, was released. This version was developed and maintained by a team of community volunteers known as the Neocron Support Team (NST). This new version introduced numerous enhancements, including extensive rework and redesign of many original game systems, with a particular focus on overhauling the weapons system.

== Character development ==
The player character may be chosen from four distinct classes. Available are genetically engineered super soldiers, ("GenTank"), the slight, yet dexterous and intelligent "Spy", the psionically focused and physically underpowered "Psi Monk" as well as the "Private Eye" (PE), commonly referred to as a Jack of All Trades for its ability to use aspects of all the other classes.

Later the player may assign "skill points" (gained from experience) into specific abilities, e.g. Construction, Research, Droning and Rifles. Any character or class can use the most basic forms of these, but to master any one of them requires a large commitment in skill points. Jobs range from the notorious hacker, who dives into the alternate reality of Hacknet, technicians who research or construct items and (especially) weapons, to the common grunt, who fights alongside his clan for the outposts, spread around the wastelands. Jobs are not physically imposed: they are a generalization taken from how skill points are distributed to attributes.

== Storyline ==
A "Subway" station in Neocron city

The game takes place in a post-apocalyptic 28th century. In the mid-22nd century, tensions rose between an expanded Chinese Empire and a joint European/North American Federation of the Free World. The unexplained apparent destruction of the first Chinese interstellar colony ship resulted in China launching devastating nuclear strikes with stealth missiles. In retaliation, the American president gave the command to counter strike with cold fusion long-range missiles. World War III started on February 17, 2143; it lasted less than 6 hours.

It took over three centuries for even the most rudimentary civilization to return. By the mid-26th century two great cities had risen from the ashes, thanks in large part to the "Ceres Project". Originally an MIT project in the early 21st century aimed at storing every aspect of human knowledge on holodisk, it had been taken over by the American military in response to the murder of the project leader.

500 years later, both cities are now but shadows of their former selves: Neocron is diminished thanks to a succession of coups d'état as well as a mass exodus to Irata III, a colony 80 light years away formed by the missing Chinese colony ship, and Dome of York suffers from losing a devastating war with Neocron.

== Reception ==
Reception

Aggregate scores
Aggregator	Score
GameRankings	69%
Metacritic	66/100

Review scores
Publication	Score
GameSpot	6.6/10
GameSpy	3/5
GameTrailers	7.4/10 (Neocron); 6.7/10 (Neocron 2)
IGN	6.5/10
PC Zone	8.5/10 (Neocron); 2.4/10 (Neocron 2)
X-Play	2/5
Adrenaline Vault	4/5
VideoGamesLife	83/100
Gamers Europe	8/10
GameStar	73/100 (Neocron); 67/100 (Neocron 2)

Neocron received generally mixed reviews. While some reviewers praised the first-person shooter style interface as "intuitive" or "innovative", others describe combat in Neocron as being "dull" or not at all revolutionary.
