= NotGTAV =

2014 video game

- Developer: NotGames
- Publisher: NotGames
- Platforms: Windows; Android; iOS; OS X; Linux
- Release: Windows: WW: 4 April 2014; iOS: WW: 31 October 2014; Android: WW: 17 November 2014; OS X, Linux: WW: 2 July 2015
- Genre: Casual
- Mode: Single-player

NotGTAV (later known as NotTheNameWeWanted) was a casual video game developed and published by NotGames. Parodying Grand Theft Auto V in a Snake manner, all profits gained from sales of the game are donated to the Peer Productions charity. The game was released for Microsoft Windows, iOS, and Android in 2014. Ports for OS X and Linux followed in 2015. The game was removed for sale in 2022.

== Gameplay ==
NotGames described NotGTAV as a "ruthless Snake-like parody" of Rockstar Games' 2013 hit title, Grand Theft Auto V, despite not sharing any aspects with the game; NotGTAV uses a top-down view model, in contrast to Grand Theft Auto V's third-person view, is set in the United Kingdom, rather than the United States, and employs hand-drawn 2D sprites, rather than a fully 3D environment.

== Release ==
NotGTAV was initially released for Microsoft Windows on 4 April 2014. On 2 July 2015, after a successful Steam Greenlight campaign, NotGames released NotGTAV onto Steam, alongside ports for OS X and Linux, however, the game disappeared again just a week later, due to Valve allegedly receiving a DMCA takedown notice from Rockstar Games. The game was restored to Steam within 24 hours, after the notice was being treated as a false complainant.

Cover art after the 2018 rebrand

As of 21 April 2018, NotGTAV was rebranded to NotTheNameWeWanted for undisclosed reasons, implied to be on the advice of legal counsel.

On 17 October 2022, the game was retired and removed for sale on Steam. Existing owners could still install and play the game.
