= Neocron 2: Beyond Dome of York =

2004 video game

- Neocron 2: Beyond Dome of York box artwork
- Developer(s): Reakktor Media GmbH
- Publisher(s): 10tacle Studios
- Release: September 29, 2004: Download September 29, 2004 Retail box; DEU: 2004-11-16; UK: 2005-07-11; FRA: 2005-09-30

Neocron 2: Beyond Dome of York is a 2004 video game which is a follow-up to 2002's Neocron. Originally slated to be an expansion pack Neocron 2 was released separately under a new publisher, 10tacle Studios AG.
