= Nessy Learning =

Educational software company

- Company type: Ltd
- Industry: Educational software
- Headquarters: Bristol, United Kingdom
- Website: www.nessy.com/uk

Nessy Learning Ltd is a publisher of educational software who developed the first online learning program for dyslexics in August, 2000.

Based in Bristol, England, Nessy was founded in 1999 by Mike Jones, primarily to publish the games and resources created at the Bristol Dyslexia Centre, a registered charity. Net Educational Systems Ltd became members of the British Educational Suppliers Association (BESA) in March, 2007. Nessy has won Education Resources Awards for various products in 2009, 2010, 2011.

Nessy has multiple online, cloud-based programs aimed at children aged 5–16 years, including Nessy Reading & Spelling, Writing Beach, Dyslexia Quest, Nessy Numbers, Nessy Fingers Touch Typing and Dyslexia Training for adults.

In July, 2007, the company published 'Nessy Tales', a series of animated reading books narrated by popular comedian Bill Bailey. The series was nominated for an Educational Resources Award (ERA) in January, 2008. The company won the award the following year for its 'Nessy Fingers Touch Typing' CD.

In 2024, Nessy Learning was acquired by ILT Education.

== See also ==
- Dyslexia support in the United Kingdom
