= Alchemist's House =

Building in Copenhagen, Denmark

- Guldmagerens Hus
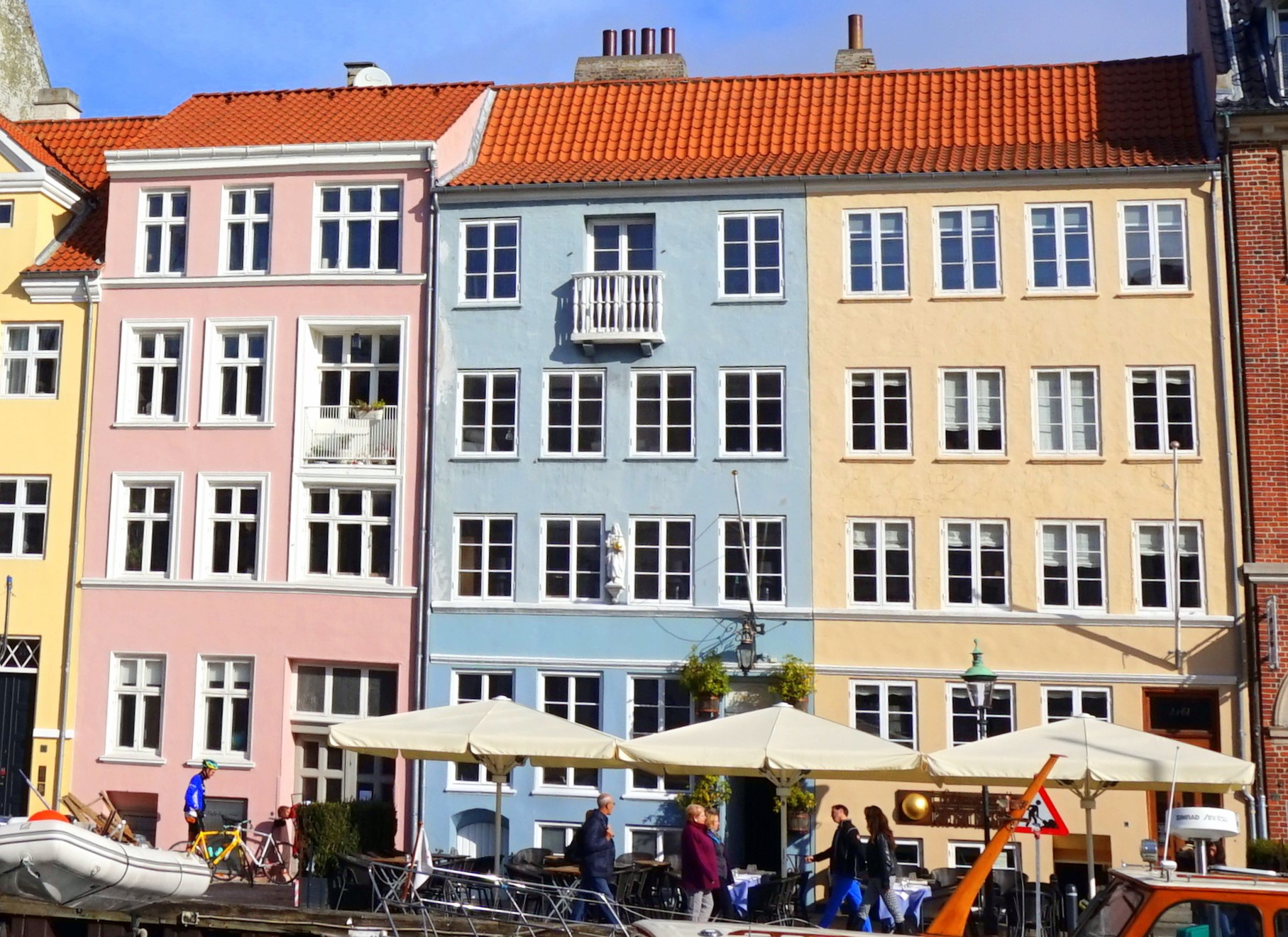
- The house seen from the other side of the canal
- Interactive map of the Alchemist's House area

General information
- Architectural style: Baroque
- Location: Copenhagen, Denmark
- Coordinates: 55°40′46.84″N 12°35′32.29″E
- Completed: 1689

The Alchemist's House (Danish: Guldmagerens Hus), situated at Nyhavn 59, is a historic property overlooking the Nyhavn Canal in central Copenhagen, Denmark.

== History ==
=== 17th and 18th centuries ===
The site was until 1689 part of a larger property. This property was as No. 20 in St. Ann's Quarter (Sankt Annæ Kvarter) owned by judge Henrik Ehlers. The current building was built in 1689 for coppersmith and alchemist Henrik Ehm. The property was by 1756 as No. 30 owned by skipper Ole Eriksen.

=== 19th century ===
In the new cadastre of 1806, the property was again listed as No. 30. It was by then owned by Jacob Henriksen.

At the time of the 1834 census, No. 30 was home to three households.

Johane Marie Mathiesen, a 56-year-old widow and the owner of the property, resided on the ground floor with four of her children (aged 16 to 29) and a maid. Andreas Marcussen, a ship captain, resided on the first floor with his wife Lene Marie Marcussen, their three children (aged two to 10), his 36-year-old sister Dorthe Cathrine Marcussen and one maid. Amon Christian Hansen, a master shoemaker, resided in the basement with his wife Magdalene Hansen, their four children (aged one to nine), the 23-year-old shoemaker Sivert Pouelsen and one maid.

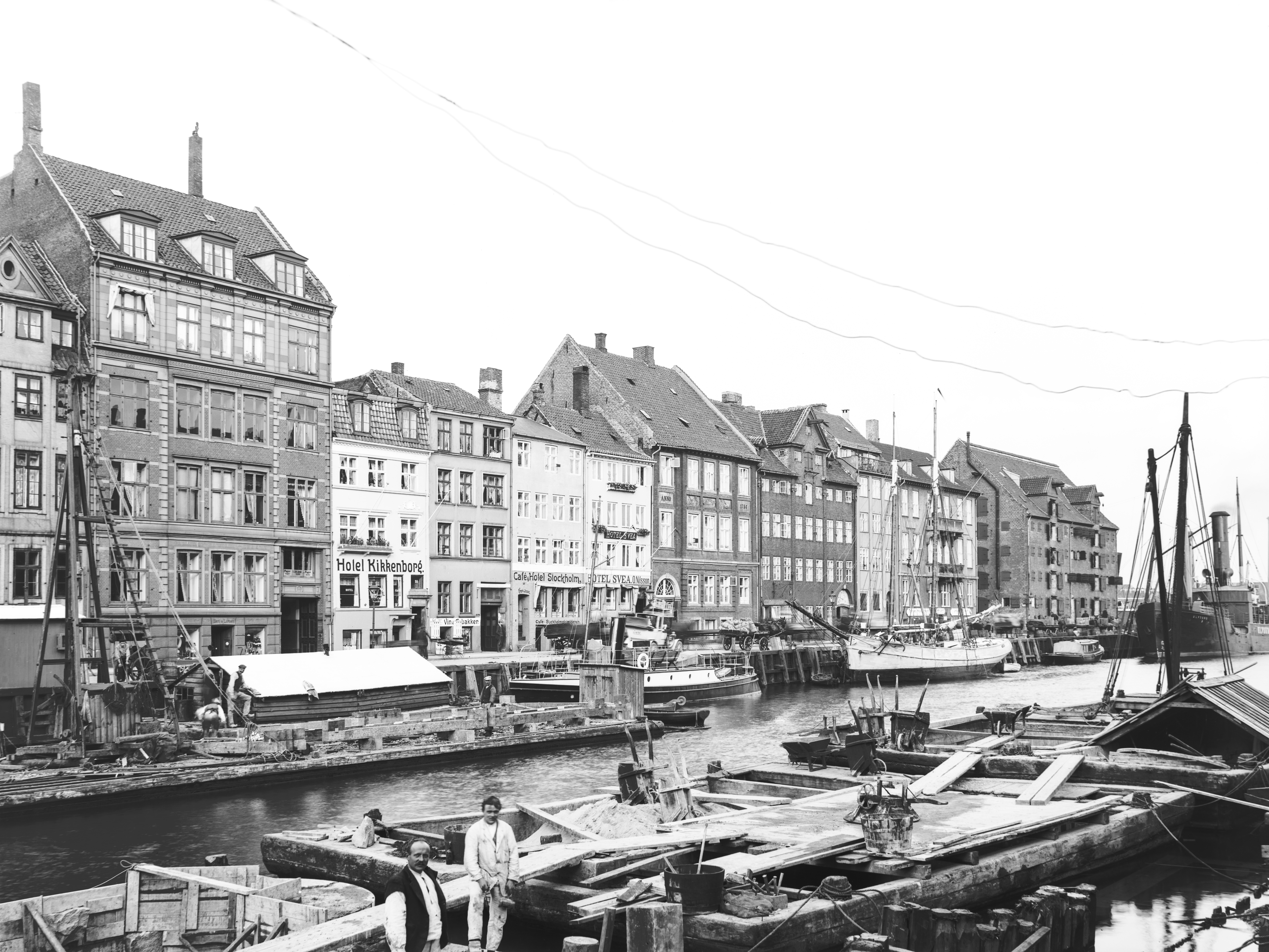
Nyhavn 59 as Hotel Stockholm in a photograph by Johannes Hauerslev

The building was long used as a hostel under the name Limfjorden. It later changed its name to Hotel Stockholm and later Hotel Dania. Guests included the Norwegian writer Knut Hamsun who stayed there under the name "postmaster Hansen from Oslo".

=== 20th century ===
A suite in the hotel also housed members of several Russian noble families who had to flee Russia during the revolution. These included Maria Feodorovna's lady-in waiting who lived there at the empress' expense.

The building was later purchased by the architect Palle Suenson and put through a comprehensive renovation. The building was listed on the Danish Registry of Protected Buildings and Places in 1945.

== Architecture ==
The house was originally constructed as a two-storey building with a two-bay wall dormer. The attic was converted into a full storey some time 1743 and 1746 and a fourth floor was added in the second half of the 1880s.

The building is four bays wide and has a balcony in front of the two central bays on the third floor. It features a Salvator Mundi sculpture between the two central windows on the first floor.

== Today ==
Most of the building has now been converted into offices but it also contains a few apartments. Restaurant Streckers is based in the ground floor of the building.

== Gallery ==
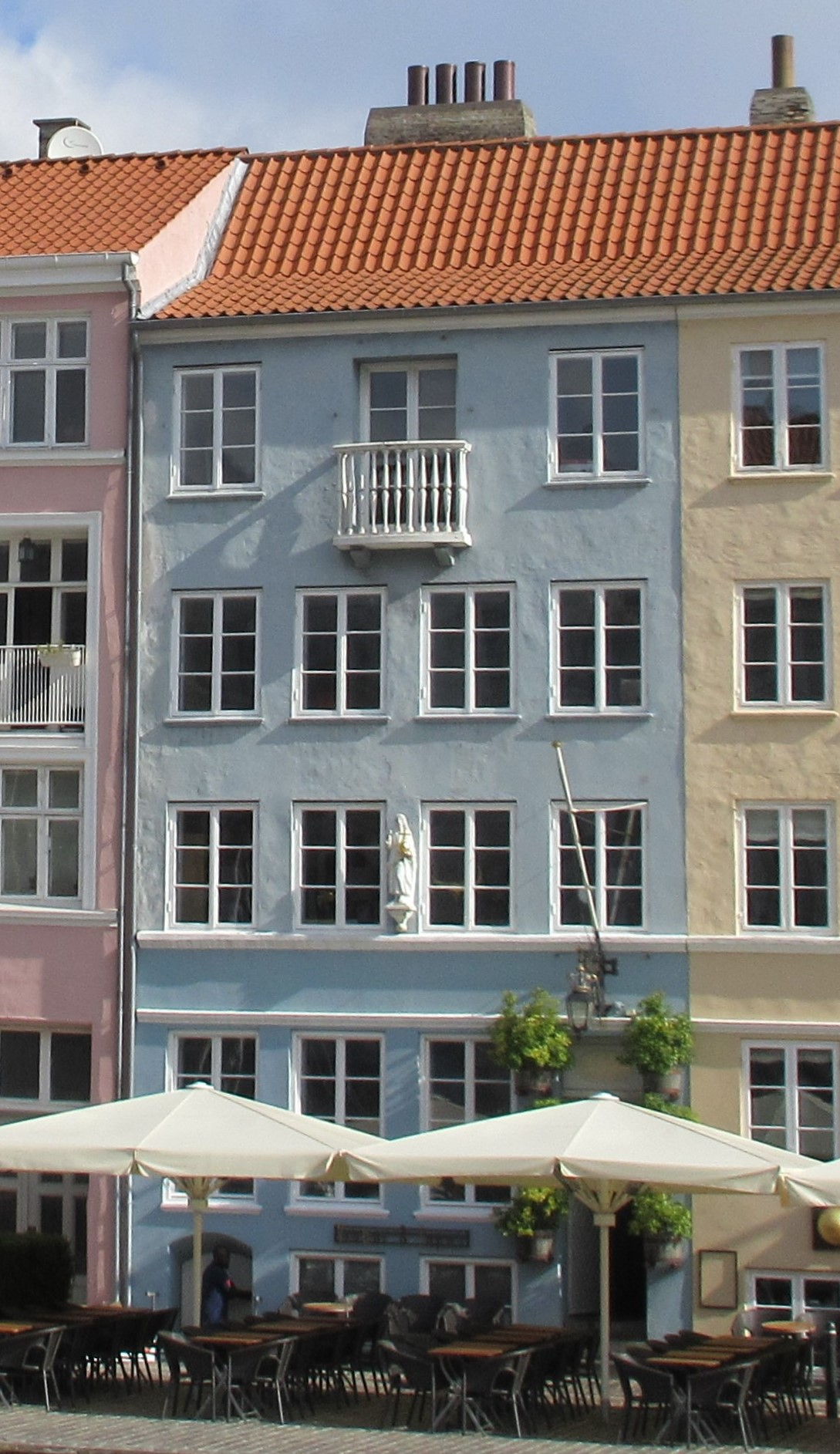

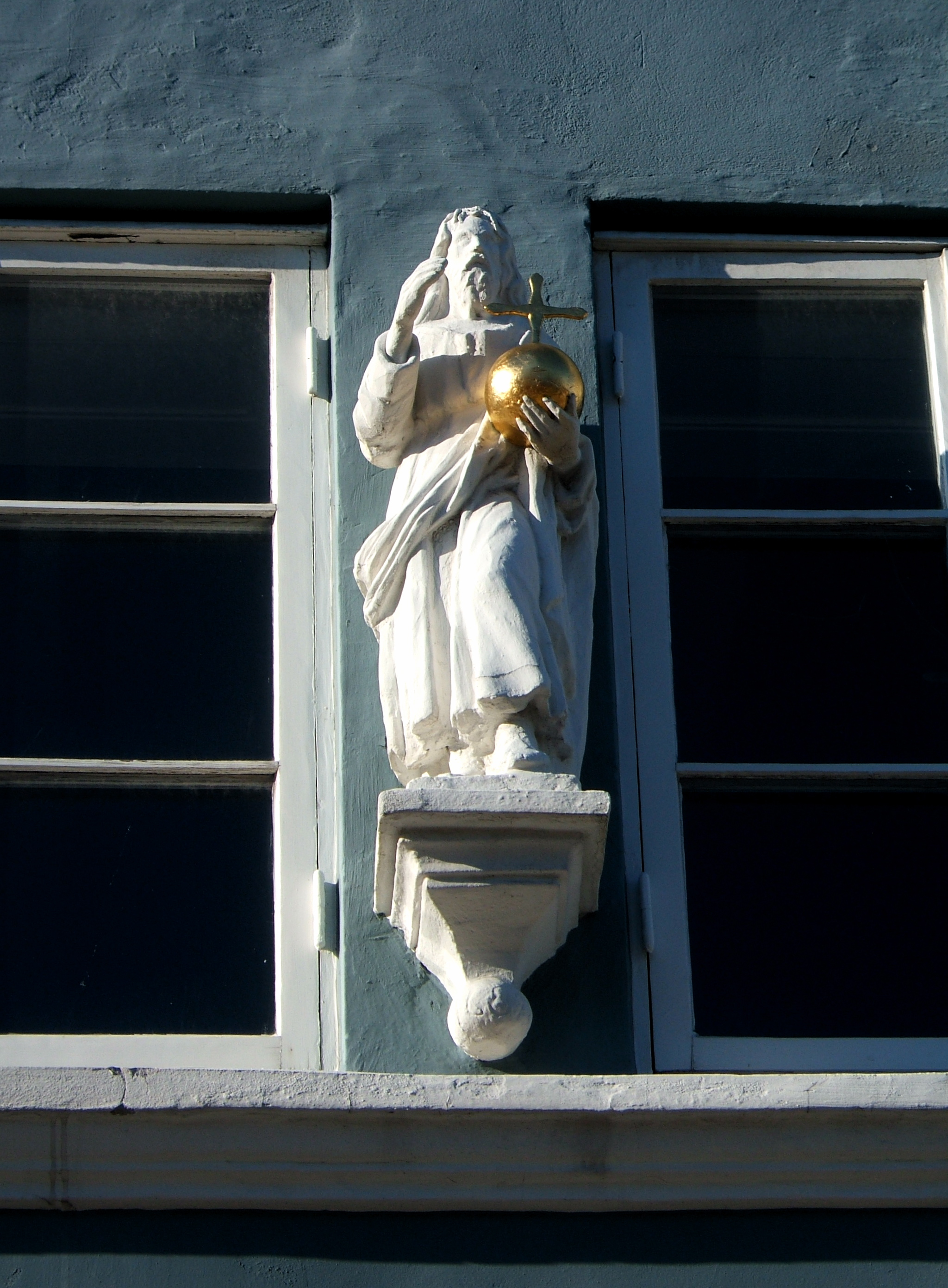
