= Fuglevad =

- Neighbourhood
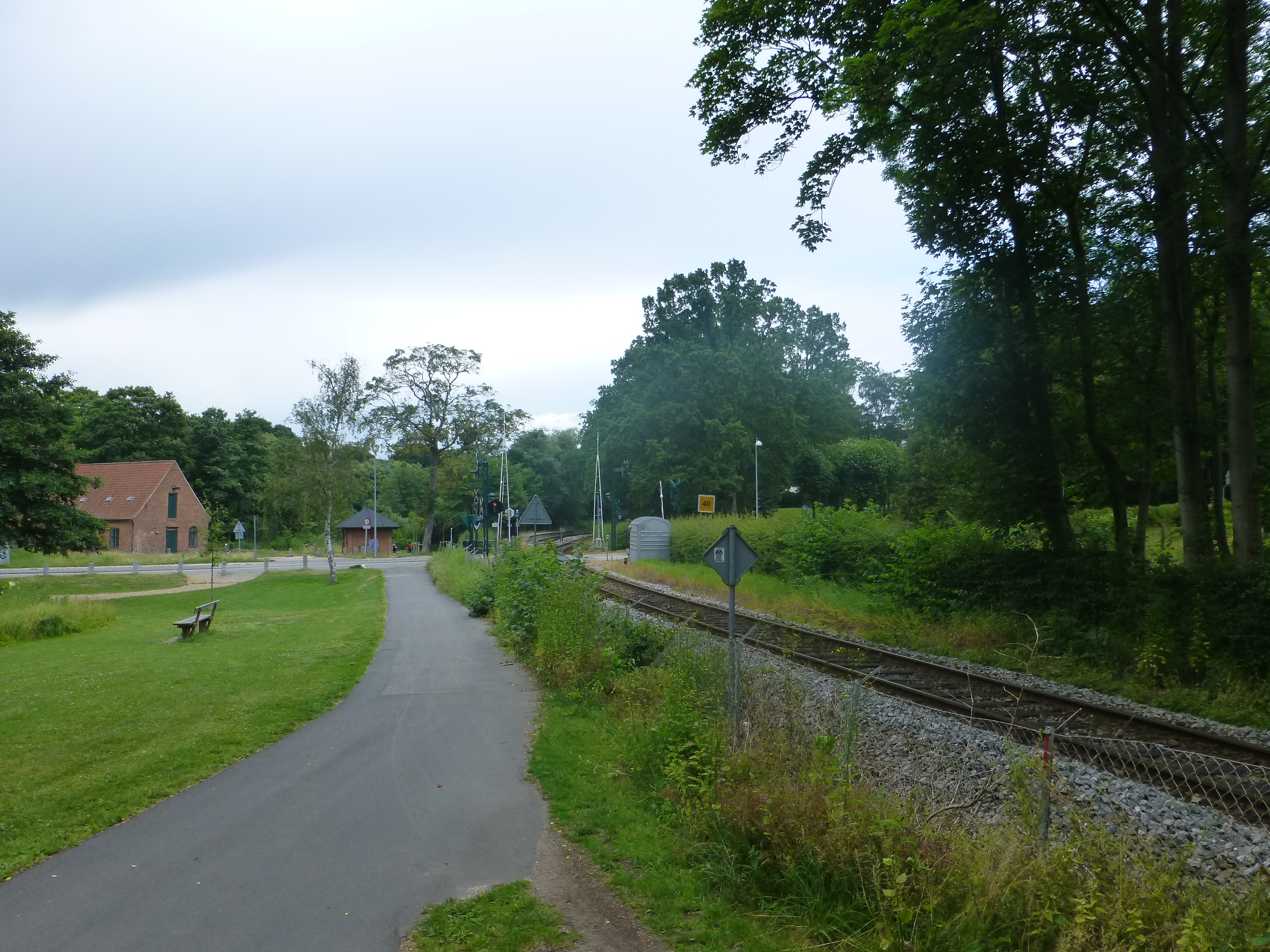
- Fuglevad Station

- Location in the Capital Region of Denmark
- Coordinates: 55.7853°N 12.4943°E
- Country: Denmark
- Region: Capital Region
- Municipality: Lyngby-Taarbæk
- Time zone: UTC+1 (CET)
  - Summer (DST): UTC+2 (CEST)

Fuglevad is a neighbourhood and locality on the Mølleåen river in Lyngby-Taarbæk Municipality in the northern suburbs of Copenhagen, Denmark. Fuglevad Watermill, located approximately one kilometer downstream from Lyndby Nordre Mølle, has a history that dates back to the 15th century but the current buildings are from the 1870s. Fuglevad Windmill, a smock mill from 1832, is now located inside the grounds of the Frilandsmuseet open-air museu which opened at the site in 1901. Fuglevad railway station is located on the Nærum Line and is served by the railway company Lokaltog.

== History ==
The first known reference to Fuglevad Watermill is from 1492. The mill is also mentioned in several documents from the early 17th century and was then called Folevd. Fole- is Old Danish for rotten, unclean or foul-smelling while -vad means ford. The watermill was owned by the crown but Böcker van Delden, a wealthy merchant from Copenhagen who already owned Brede Watermill and Stampemølle, received it in fee in 1629. He went bankrupt in 1633 and the mills at Fuglevad and Brede was then taken over by Henrik Rosenmeyer. In 1668, the crown sold the mill to the coppersmith Henrik Ehm. Part of the deal was also Mølletorp, which was later replaced by senere Palace. Martinus Nürnberg purchased the mill later in the century and his son Laurids Nürnberg took it over in 1734. He adapted Fuglevad for use as a sharpening mill with a production of scythe. In 1753, Fuglevad was taken over by the same partnership that owned Brede and Nymølle and the mill was from then on used as a branch of the copperworks there.

In 1802, Jørgen Christian Lund acquired Fuglevad Watermill. His widow ran the mill after his death in 1818 until it was passed on to Johan Jørgen Lund in 1828. Due to problem with too little water in the river, he constructed he windmill on a hill to the west of the watermill in 1832. In 1862, both mills were taken over by Carl Tommerup who was married to Lund's eldest daughter Sophie Amalie. In 1872, he sold it to the paper manufacturer J.C. Drewsen & Sons from Strandmøllen but the following year they sold it to Ludvig Gudmann with a Contractual term excluding it from use as a paper mill.

Gudmann and his partner G. F. Hamann tore down the old watermill and replaced it with the current building in 1874 which was used for manufacturing artificial leather. The old water wheel was replaced by a turbine. William Salmonsen purchased Fuglevad and Brede Mills in 1883. Over the next decades it was used for changing industrial activities including as a galvanisation plant until it was sold to Lyngby-Taarbæk Municipality in 1828. National Museum rook over the buildings in 1960.

Ludvig Gudmann had constructed the house Villa Folevad at a site close to the watermill. It was purchased by the Parish of Lyngby in 1930 and ceded to an orphanage but it was turned into a private residence in about 1950. It was acquired by National Museum in the 1960s but sold in 2005.

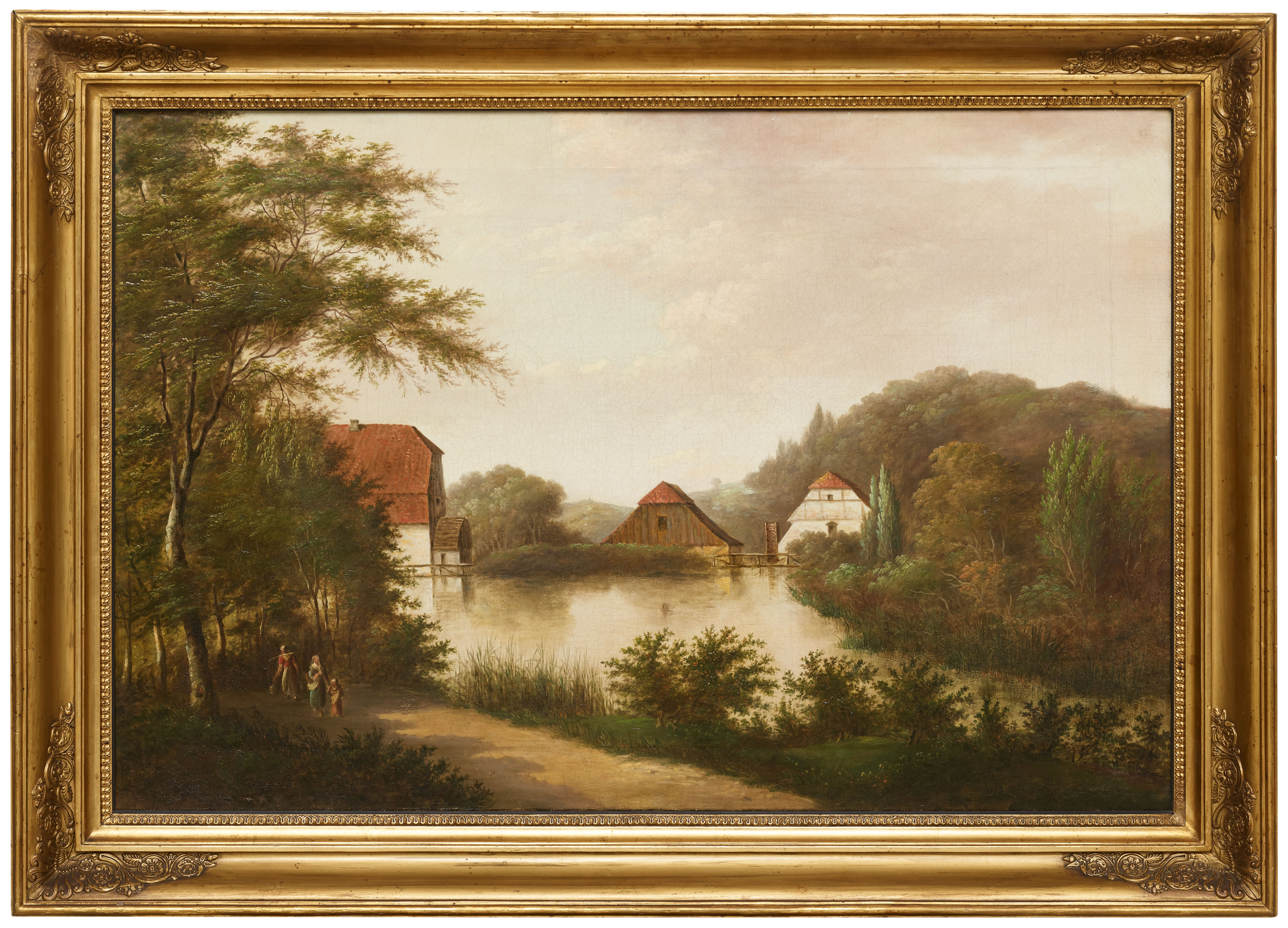
Fuglevad Watermill

Fuglevad Watermill is owned by Lyndby-Taarbæk Municipality. It is built in red brick and has a tile roof. The water turbine has been removed and the mill is thus no longer operational. The building is operated as a venue for meetings and other events. Picnic facilities are also available at the site.

Fuglevad Windmill is the only building on display in the Frilandsmuseet open-air museum which stands in its original location. The museum opened at the site in 1901 and boasts a total of four windmills and three watermills. Fuglevad Windmill is a smock mill and operated on special occasions.

== Gallery ==
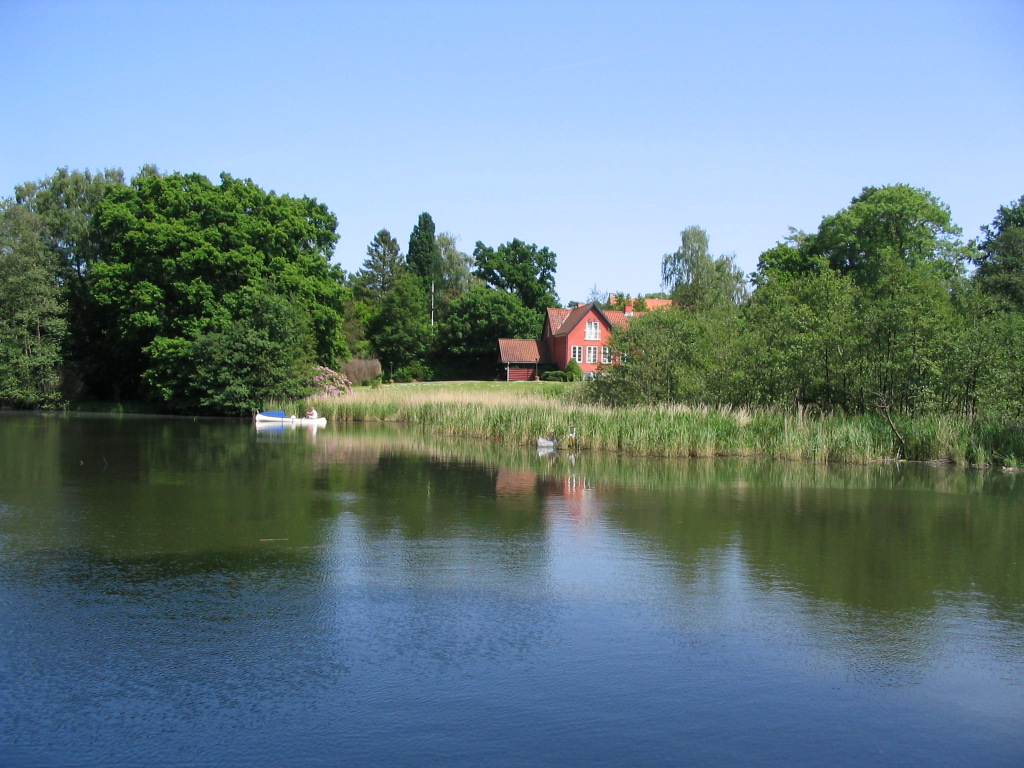
Fuglevad Mill Pond

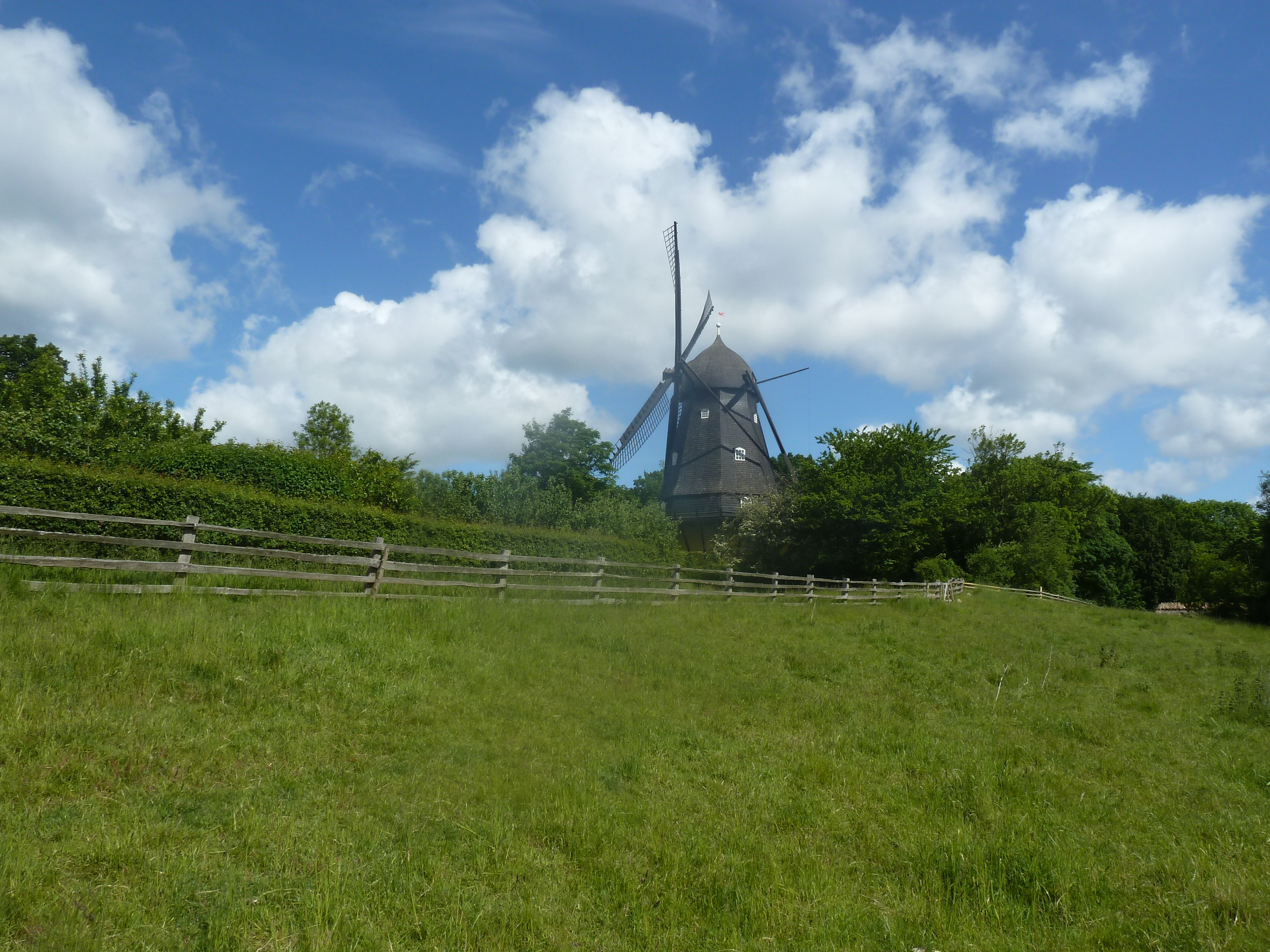
Fuglevad in about 1834

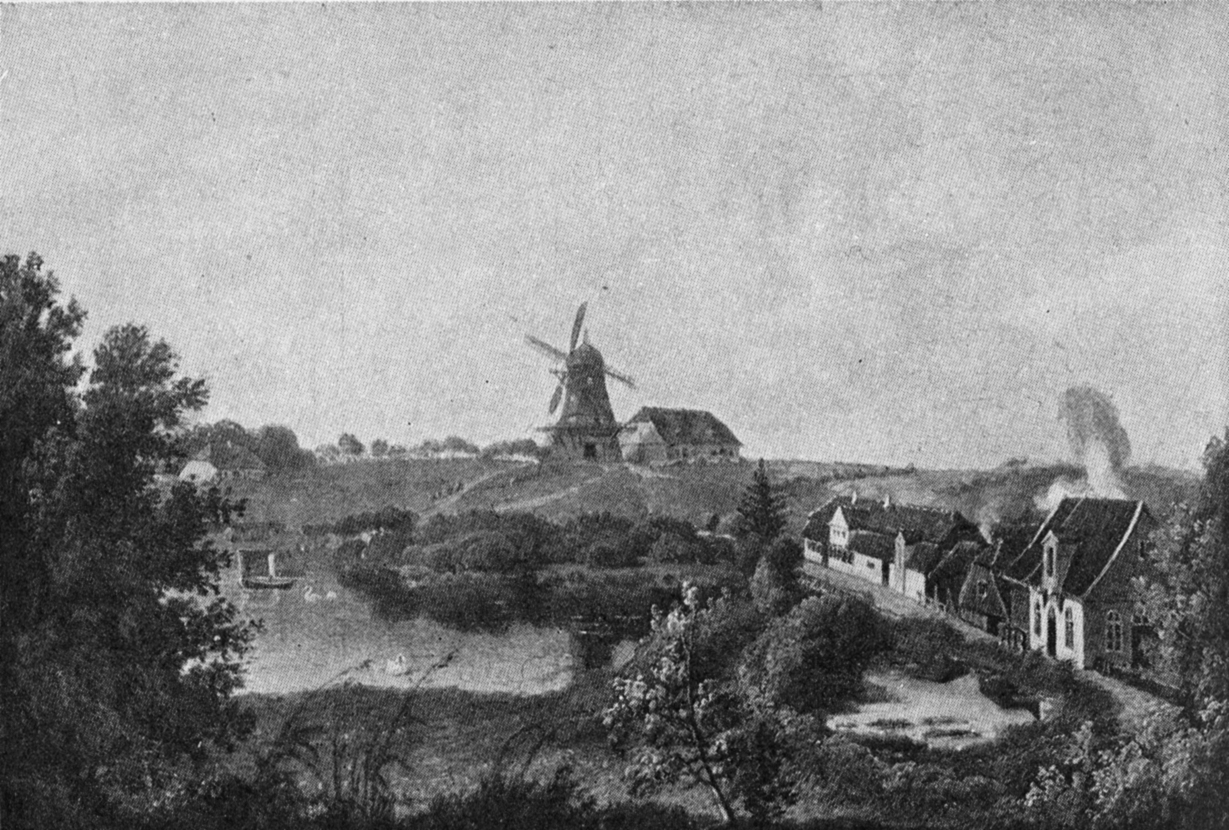
Fuglevad in about 1860

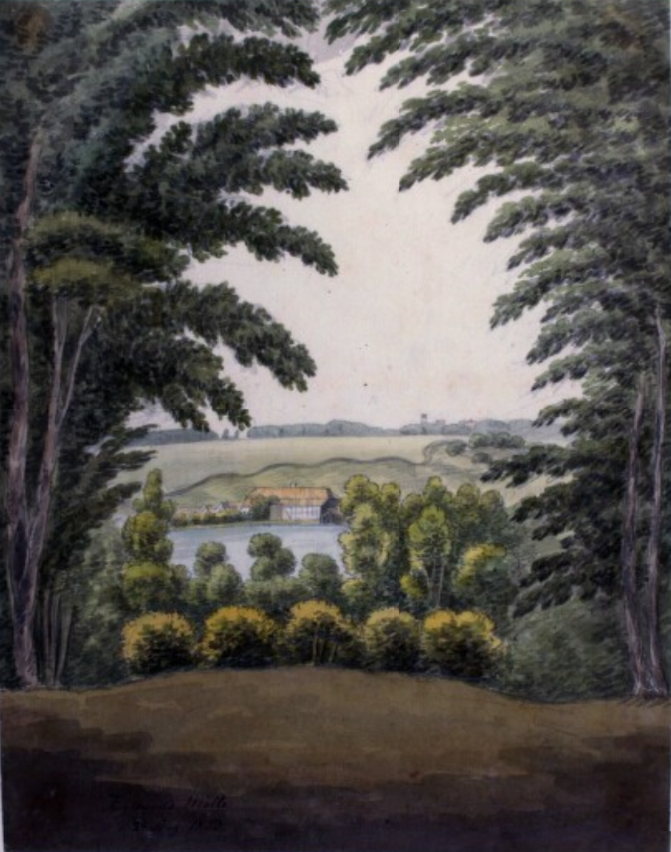
Ole Kørgen Rawert: Fuglevad Mill, 23 August 1823
