= Hammermøllen =

Watermill in Hellebæk, Denmark

Coordinates: 56.0653°N 12.5538°E

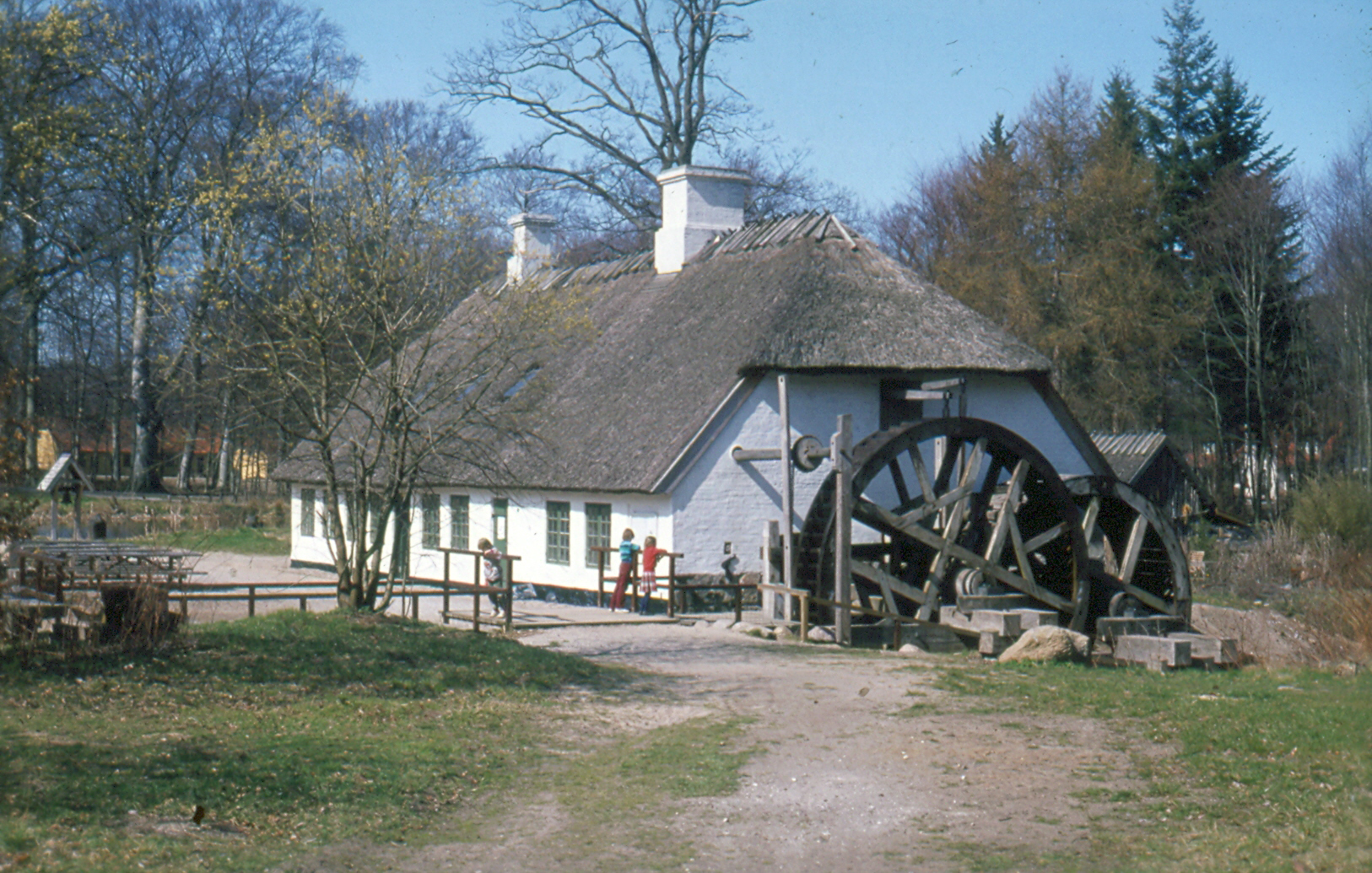
Hammermøllen

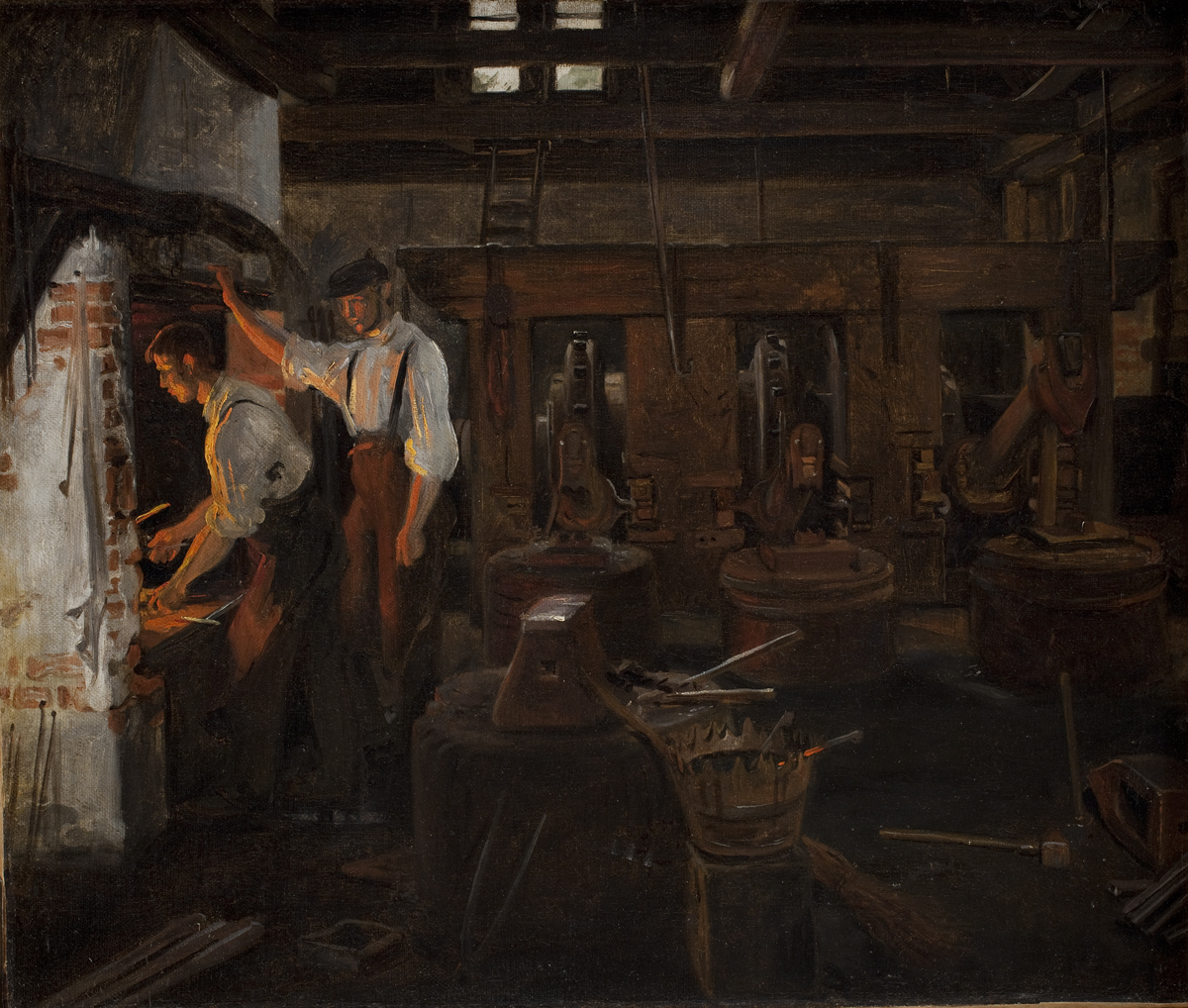
An interior from the Hammer Mill painted by Constantin Hansen in 1859

Hammermøllen was a set of water mills at Hellebæk, Denmark.

== History ==
The first mill on the site was built in 1576, but it was only linked to weapons production from 1601, when the gun foundry was built nearby. It was used to power the Kronborg weapons factory. It then produced weapons until 1870, peaking in the 18th century, when the factory employed 200 men and produced 6000 guns a year.

The mill has two water wheels, one of which drives two pairs of bellows - providing air for the forge - the other driving two hammers, under which the barrels of the guns were forged. The river was first dammed here in the 16th century immediately before the construction of the first mill, providing energy to industrial production until 1976, initially to produce guns then (from 1873 onwards, when the Hellebæk Klædefabrik took it over) clothing. It was only at the end of the 18th century that the ponds system there was fully developed, with 27 dammed pools.

After the factory closed in 1976, Hammermøllen became a cultural hub for the region and it now houses a museum with a model of Hellebæk in 1823, a blacksmith's shop and an exhibition of weapons. In 1991, the Hellebæk-Aalsgaard Regional History Archive moved to Hammermøllen.
