= Eastside Hockey Manager (video game) =

2015 sports video game

- Developer: Sports Interactive
- Publisher: Sega
- Designer: Risto Remes
- Series: Eastside Hockey Manager
- Platform: Windows
- Release: December 1, 2015
- Genres: Sports game, ice hockey
- Modes: Single player, multiplayer

Eastside Hockey Manager (often abbreviated as EHM) is an ice hockey management simulation game, and is the latest edition of the Eastside Hockey Manager series. It is developed by SI Games and published by Sega. A beta version was released through Steam Early Access on 26 March 2015. The game left Early Access on 1 December 2015.

== Gameplay ==
Eastside Hockey Manager is a sports simulation game, which allows the player to take control of an ice hockey team from over 30 playable leagues. Currently the game does not have any official licenses within the game (with the exception of the British-based Elite Ice Hockey League), as a result fictional league, team and player names are used instead. Once the user has selected a team to manage, they are able to make changes to their roster, via trading, drafting or signing new players. From there they can scout new players, set their preferred tactics, and play against other teams. When the user is playing against another team, they can watch the game via a top down 2D match engine.

As a result of the fictional nature of the game, several fans and unaffiliated websites have created 3rd party data packs that add real leagues, teams and players into the game, for example, the league featured in the game as 'National League' becomes the National Hockey League. Many of these data packs can have been uploaded to the Steam Workshop which allows users to import real life information into their game.

The game includes over 30 playable leagues, 10 more than the previous edition.

== Development ==
Eastside Hockey Manager is the most recent edition in the Eastside Hockey Manager franchise, and is the direct successor to NHL Eastside Hockey Manager 2007. The series was put on an indefinite hiatus after the 2007 version of the game, due to low sales figures which the developers claimed was largely as a result of online piracy.

After an eight-year hiatus, Eastside Hockey Manager was initially released as a Steam Early Access title on March 26, 2015. Lead designer Risto Remes does the bulk of the work for this version of EHM, when not working on the Football Manager series. Following this release, the game was updated every fortnight, during which time game-play was constantly refined and new playable leagues were added. On 1 December, 2015 it was announced that EHM had officially left Early Access. When first launched, EHM featured 11 playable leagues and competitions, whereas by the time the game had left Early Access that figure had risen to an excess of 30 playable leagues and competitions. On 11 May 2016, the first official data pack was released after a licensing agreement was signed with the Elite Ice Hockey League. This data pack allows the user to include all the official player and team data and images for the 10 teams within the league.
