= NHL Eastside Hockey Manager 2005 =

2005 video game

- Developer(s): Sports Interactive
- Publisher(s): Sega
- Platform(s): Windows, Mac
- Release: May 27, 2005
- Genre(s): Sports, ice hockey
- Mode(s): Single-player, multiplayer

NHL Eastside Hockey Manager 2005 is an ice hockey management simulation game in the Eastside Hockey Manager series. It was developed by Sports Interactive (SI Games) and published by Sega. The European version of the game was released on May 27, 2005 and an updated North American version followed in September 2005.

== Gameplay ==
Commonly known as NHL EHM 2005, the game added new licensed leagues including the AHL and ECHL as well as introducing a host of new features such as training camps and a tactical 2D view. Other areas of the game, such as the interface, were upgraded based on the feedback received from the growing community around the game and the game database grew to include over 30,000 players and staff. The game engine and interface were developed further to create a common look and feel with one of Sports Interactive's popular football management games, Football Manager 2005. A digital download version was again made available soon after the retail release.

The North American version of the game was released on September 27, 2005. This version included new rules for all the featured leagues based on the 2005–06 hockey season. One of the main areas updated in the North American version was the NHL and the new rules including the salary cap. At the same time, SI Games made available a free season update for the European version of the game, which update the earlier release with the new rules and data included in the North American release version.

== Reception ==
NHL Eastside Hockey Manager 2005 was a runner-up for Computer Games Magazine's list of the top 10 computer games of 2005.
