= Eastside Hockey Manager =

- Genre(s): Sports
- Developer(s): Risto Remes; Sports Interactive
- Publisher(s): Sega
- Creator(s): Risto Remes
- Platform(s): Microsoft Windows, Mac OS
- First release: Eastside Hockey Manager; 2001
- Latest release: Eastside Hockey Manager; 2015

Eastside Hockey Manager, commonly known as EHM or NHL EHM is a video game series about managing an ice hockey team. The series started out as a popular freeware game and later evolved into the commercial NHL Eastside Hockey Manager games developed by Sports Interactive and published by Sega.

== Eastside Hockey Manager (2001) ==
The game series started out after a small hobby project Eastside Hockey Manager grew step by step and eventually led into the creation of a freeware game called Eastside Hockey Manager: 2nd Generation, generally referred to as the original Eastside Hockey Manager or in short EHM. This first public release in the series was created by a small independent team led by Finnish programmer Risto Remes. The freeware video game is about managing an ice hockey team. Complete with computer controlled AI teams and the possibility to set up online leagues to play against friends.

The game simulated the full National Hockey League season and had a database of around 3,000 players and staff and featured virtually unlimited number of seasons to play. After the game picked up a large following in the internet, it was 'spotted' by a leading member of British game developers Sports Interactive.

== NHL Eastside Hockey Manager ==
In 2002, the series branched as Remes signed with Sports Interactive to work on a commercial version of the game. The new version of the game went by the working title of "Eastside Hockey Manager: Franchise Edition" before being released by Sega under the name of NHL Eastside Hockey Manager in 2004. Rather than bringing over the code of the original freeware game, the new game was built upon the technology used in Sports Interactive's highly successful soccer management series Championship Manager 3.

== NHL Eastside Hockey Manager 2005 ==
In May 2005, Sports Interactive and Sega released the first sequel for the commercial version, called NHL Eastside Hockey Manager 2005. The European release of the 2005 version was based on the 2004–05 hockey season and featured new licensed leagues to play and updated the user interface of the game as well as other areas of the game. In late September 2005, a North American version of the game was released with updated rules for the 2005–06 hockey season. At the same time, a free season update was released for the European version of the 2005 game to bring it up-to-date.

The artwork for NHL Eastside Hockey Manager 2005 included a photograph of Michael Brabon who at the time, was playing for Cardiff Devils.

== NHL Eastside Hockey Manager 2007 ==
NHL Eastside Hockey Manager 2007 was released on September 22, 2006. It includes many new features, such as a fantasy draft, a new real-time 2D engine and a new GUI. This game is only currently available via digital download.

== Eastside Hockey Manager (2015) ==
Eastside Hockey Manager was released on December 1, 2015, and is the newest edition of the game after an eight-year hiatus. It includes many new features, such as an increase in the number of playable leagues and international competitions, an improved 2D match engine, support for custom and historic databases, and full Steam Workshop functionality. This game is only currently available on PC, via Steam.
