= On the Jungle Floor =

On The Jungle Floor

Studio album by Van Hunt
- Released: April 5, 2006
- Recorded: East Iris Studios; Mouth Of Babes Studios; The Pass; Signet Sound
- Genres: R&B, funk, rock
- Length: 56:31
- Label: Capitol
- Producers: Bill Bottrell, Van Hunt

Van Hunt chronology
Van Hunt (2004)	On The Jungle Floor (2006)	What Were You Hoping For? (2011)

On The Jungle Floor is R&B singer-songwriter Van Hunt's second album. It was released during the spring on April 4, 2006 and featured the singles "Character" and "Being A Girl". The album was produced by Bill Bottrell, who previously worked with Sheryl Crow, Shelby Lynne and Michael Jackson.

On the Jungle Floor was a radical departure from his 2004 debut, as it is geared toward a hard rock sound. The album contains a cover of two songs – the first of which is "Mean Sleep" – a song that Hunt wrote with actress Cree Summer on her lone album Street Faërie. Another song that is a cover is the song "No Sense of Crime" – a track that was originally recorded by the former members of The Stooges, Iggy Pop and James Williamson on their 1975 album Kill City.

Due to the subsequent shelving of what would have been his third album Popular, On the Jungle Floor remains as his last recording released on a major label.

Professional ratings
Review scores
Source	Rating
AllMusic	4/5 stars
The A.V. Club	B+
Entertainment Weekly	A−
The New York Times	favorable
Paste	favorable
Q	3/5 stars
Rolling Stone	3/5 stars
Slant Magazine	2.5/5 stars
Spin	B−
Vibe	4/5 stars

== Track listing ==
- All songs written by Van Hunt, except as noted.
1. "Intro"
2. "If I Take You Home (Upon...)" (Van Hunt, George Gordon, L. James, D. Smith, Curtis Whitehead)
3. "Hot Stage Lights"
4. "Daredevil, Baby"
5. "Ride, Ride, Ride" (Van Hunt, Curtis Whitehead)
6. "Being A Girl"
7. "Suspicion (She Knows Me Too Well)" (Van Hunt, Delaney Bramlett)
8. "Mean Sleep" (featuring Nikka Costa) (Van Hunt, Cree Summer)
9. "Priest Or Police"
10. "Character"
11. "Interlude"
12. "No Sense Of Crime" (Iggy Pop, James Williamson)
13. "At The End Of A Slow Dance" (Van Hunt, Curtis Whitehead)
14. "The Thrill Of This Love"
15. "The Night Is Young" (Van Hunt, Curtis Whitehead)

== Personnel ==
- Bill Bottrell: guitar, bass, keyboards, recording engineer, mixing
- Van Hunt: guitar, bass, keyboards, drums
- George Gordon: bass, guitar
- Curtis Whitehead: bass, guitar
- Elizabeth Nation: keyboards
- Truth: keyboards
- Brian MacLeod: drums
- Lorenzo Whitehead: drums
- Tracy Williams: drums
- Daniel Solammon, Albert Wing: horns
- Van Hunt, Bill Bottrell, Sheree Brown, Annie Clemens, Sharlotte Gibson, Jacquelyne Komonpar, Elizabeth Nation, Mimi Lou Parker, Rahsaan Patterson, Tamara Powell, Truth, Curtis Whitehead: background vocals
- Melissa Mattey, Mimi Lou Parker: recording engineer
- Brian Gardner: mastering
- Nathaniel Goldberg, Rick Diamond, Matt Jones: photography
- Eric Roinestad: art direction and design
