= 3rd British Academy Games Awards =

Game award ceremony in 2006

- Date: 5 October 2006
- Location: The Roundhouse
- Hosted by: Vernon Kay
- Best Game: Tom Clancy's Ghost Recon Advanced Warfighter
- Most awards: Tom Clancy's Ghost Recon Advanced Warfighter, LocoRoco & Shadow of the Colossus (2)
- Most nominations: Tom Clancy's Ghost Recon Advanced Warfighter & LocoRoco (8)

The 3rd British Academy Video Games Awards (known for the purposes of sponsorship as British Academy Video Games Awards in Association with N-Gage), awarded by the British Academy of Film and Television Arts, was an award ceremony held on 5 October 2006 in The Roundhouse. The ceremony honoured achievement in 2006 and was hosted by Vernon Kay. Tom Clancy's Ghost Recon Advanced Warfighter, LocoRoco & Shadow of the Colossus were the major winners on the night, taking two awards.

== Winners and nominees ==
Winners are shown first in bold.

**Action and Adventure (Sponsored by PC World)**: **Shadow of the Colossus – Team Ico and Japan Studio/Sony Computer Entertainment**; Metroid Prime Hunters – Nintendo Software Technology/Nintendo; The Elder Scrolls IV: Oblivion – Bethesda Game Studios/Bethesda Softworks; Tom Clancy's Ghost Recon Advanced Warfighter – Ubisoft Paris/Ubisoft; Tomb Raider: Legend – Crystal Dynamics/Eidos Interactive; We Love Katamari – Namco/Namco	**Innovation**: **Dr. Kawashima's Brain Training: How Old Is Your Brain? – Nintendo SPD/Nintendo**; Electroplankton – indieszero/Nintendo; Guitar Hero – Harmonix/RedOctane; LocoRoco – Japan Studio/Sony Computer Entertainment; Shadow of the Colossus – Team Ico and Japan Studio/Sony Computer Entertainment; We Love Katamari – Namco/Namco
**Artistic Achievement**: **Shadow of the Colossus – Team Ico and Japan Studio/Sony Computer Entertainment**; Black – Criterion Games/Electronic Arts; Hitman: Blood Money – IO Interactive/Eidos Interactive; LocoRoco – Japan Studio/Sony Computer Entertainment; The Elder Scrolls IV: Oblivion – Bethesda Game Studios/Bethesda Softworks; We Love Katamari – Namco/Namco	**Multiplayer**: **Dungeons and Dragons Online: Stormreach – Turbine/Atari**; 2006 FIFA World Cup – EA Canada/EA Sports; Animal Crossing: Wild World – Nintendo EAD/Nintendo; Battlefield 2: Modern Combat – Digital Illusions CE/Electronic Arts; Guild Wars Factions – ArenaNet/NCSOFT; Tom Clancy's Ghost Recon Advanced Warfighter – Ubisoft Paris/Ubisoft
**Audio**: **Electroplankton – indieszero/Nintendo**; Black – Criterion Games/Electronic Arts; LocoRoco – Japan Studio/Sony Computer Entertainment; Tom Clancy's Ghost Recon Advanced Warfighter – Ubisoft Paris/Ubisoft; Tomb Raider: Legend – Crystal Dynamics/Eidos Interactive; We Love Katamari – Namco/Namco	**Original Score**: **Tomb Raider: Legend – Troels Brun Folmann, Crystal Dynamics/Eidos Interactive**; Dragon Quest VIII: Journey of the Cursed King – Koichi Sugiyama, Level-5/Square Enix; LocoRoco – Nobuyuki Shimizu and Kemmei Adachi, Japan Studio/Sony Computer Entertainment; Shadow of the Colossus – Kow Otani, Japan Studio and Team Ico/Sony Computer Entertainment; The Elder Scrolls IV: Oblivion – Jeremy Soule, Bethesda Game Studios/Bethesda Softworks; The Movies – Lionhead Studios/Activision
**Casual and Social**: **Buzz!: The BIG Quiz – Relentless Software/Sony Computer Entertainment Europe**; Dr. Kawashima's Brain Training: How Old Is Your Brain? – Nintendo SPD/Nintendo; Electroplankton – indieszero/Nintendo; Guitar Hero – Harmonix/RedOctane; LocoRoco – Japan Studio/Sony Computer Entertainment; SingStar Rocks! – London Studio/Sony Computer Entertainment	**Screenplay**: **Psychonauts – Double Fine Productions/Majesco**; 24: The Game – SCE Studio Cambridge/Sony Computer Entertainment Europe; Rogue Trooper – Rebellion Developments/Eidos Interactive; The Elder Scrolls IV: Oblivion – Bethesda Game Studios/Bethesda Softworks; Tom Clancy's Ghost Recon Advanced Warfighter – Bethesda Game Studios/Bethesda Softworks; Tomb Raider: Legend – Crystal Dynamics/Eidos Interactive
**Character**: **LocoRoco (LocoRoco)**; Agent 47 (Hitman: Blood Money); Han Solo (Lego Star Wars II: The Original Trilogy); Lara Croft (Tomb Raider: Legend); Rogue (Rogue Trooper)	**Simulation**: **The Movies – Lionhead Studios/Activision**; C-130 Hercules – Captain Sim/Just Flight; Championship Manager 2006 – Beautiful Game Studios and Gusto Games/Eidos Interactive; Football Manager 2006 – Sports Interactive/Sega; Rockstar Games Presents Table Tennis – Rockstar San Diego/Rockstar Games; Trauma Center: Under the Knife – Atlus/Atlus
**Children's**: **LocoRoco – Japan Studio/Sony Computer Entertainment**; Daxter – Ready at Dawn/Sony Computer Entertainment; Ice Age: The Meltdown – Eurocom/Sierra Entertainment, Fox Interactive and Vivendi Universal Games; Lego Star Wars II: The Original Trilogy – Traveller's Tales/LucasArts; New Super Mario Bros. – Nintendo EAD/Nintendo; We Love Katamari – Namco/Namco	**Soundtrack**: **Guitar Hero – Harmonix/RedOctane**; B-Boy – FreeStyleGames/Evolved Games; Reservoir Dogs – Volatile Games/Eidos Interactive; SingStar Rocks! – London Studio/Sony Computer Entertainment Europe
**Game (Sponsored by PC World)**: **Tom Clancy's Ghost Recon Advanced Warfighter** **– Ubisoft Paris/Ubisoft**; Black – Criterion Games/Electronic Arts; Dr. Kawashima's Brain Training: How Old Is Your Brain? – Nintendo SPD/Nintendo; Guitar Hero – Harmonix/RedOctane; Hitman: Blood Money – IO Interactive/Eidos Interactive; Lego Star Wars II: The Original Trilogy – Traveller's Tales/LucasArts	**Sports**: **Fight Night Round 3 – EA Chicago/Electronic Arts**; 2006 FIFA World Cup – EA Canada/EA Sports; Football Manager 2006 – Sports Interactive/Sega; MotoGP '06 – Climax Racing/THQ; Pro Evolution Soccer 6 – Konami/Konami; Rockstar Games Presents Table Tennis – Rockstar San Diego/Rockstar Games
**Gameplay (Sponsored by Nokia N-Gage)**: **Lego Star Wars II: The Original Trilogy – Traveller's Tales/LucasArts**; Guitar Hero – Harmonix/RedOctane; LocoRoco – Japan Studio/Sony Computer Entertainment; The Elder Scrolls IV: Oblivion – Bethesda Game Studios/Bethesda Softworks; Tom Clancy's Ghost Recon Advanced Warfighter – Ubisoft Paris/Ubisoft; We Love Katamari – Namco/Namco	**Strategy**: **Rise and Fall: Civilizations at War – Stainless Steel Studios and Midway Games San Diego/Midway Games**; Age of Empires: The Age of Kings – Backbone Entertainment/Majesco; Civilization IV – Firaxis Games/2K Games; Football Manager 2006 – Sports Interactive/Sega; Medieval II: Total War – Creative Assembly/Sega; Tom Clancy's Ghost Recon Advanced Warfighter – Ubisoft Paris/Ubisoft
**Gamers' Award (Sponsored by Nokia N-Gage)**: **24: The Mobile Game – I-play**; Civilization for N-Gage – MPS Labs/MicroProse; Diner Dash – Gamelab/PlayFirst; Lemmings – DMA Design/Psygnosis; Namco Classics Pac-Man – Namco/Namco; Platinum Sudoku – Gameloft/Gameloft and Ubisoft; The Sims – Maxis/Electronic Arts; Sonic the Hedgehog Part One – Sonic Team/Sega; Tetris Mania – EA Mobile/Electronic Arts; Who Wants to Be a Millionaire? – Jellyvision/Buena Vista Games	**Technical Achievement (Sponsored by Skillset)**: **Tom Clancy's Ghost Recon Advanced Warfighter – Ubisoft Paris/Ubisoft**; Battlefield 2: Modern Combat – Digital Illusions CE/Electronic Arts; Black – Criterion Games/Electronic Arts; Burnout Revenge – Criterion Games/Electronic Arts; Just Cause – Avalanche Studios/Eidos Interactive; Shadow of the Colossus – Team Ico and Japan Studio/Sony Computer Entertainment

=== Games with multiple nominations and wins ===
==== Nominations ====
Nominations	Game
8	Tom Clancy's Ghost Recon Advanced Warfighter
8	LocoRoco
6	We Love Katamari
5	Guitar Hero
5	Shadow of the Colossus
5	The Elder Scrolls IV: Oblivion
5	Tomb Raider: Legend
4	Black
4	Lego Star Wars II: The Original Trilogy
3	Dr. Kawashima's Brain Training: How Old Is Your Brain?
3	Electroplankton
3	Football Manager 2006
3	Hitman: Blood Money
2	2006 FIFA World Cup
2	Battlefield 2: Modern Combat
2	Rockstar Games Presents Table Tennis
2	Rogue Trooper
2	SingStar Rocks!
2	The Movies

==== Wins ====
Awards	Game
2	Tom Clancy's Ghost Recon Advanced Warfighter
2	LocoRoco
2	Shadow of the Colossus
