= Peter Dyer =

Peter Dyer may refer to:

- Peter Dyer, fictional character in Angus, Thongs and Perfect Snogging
- Peter the Dyer, Patriarch of Antioch
- Peter Swinnerton-Dyer (1927–2018), English mathematician
- Peter Dyer, musician on What Were You Hoping For?
