= Van Hunt =

American singer, songwriter and record producer (born 1970)

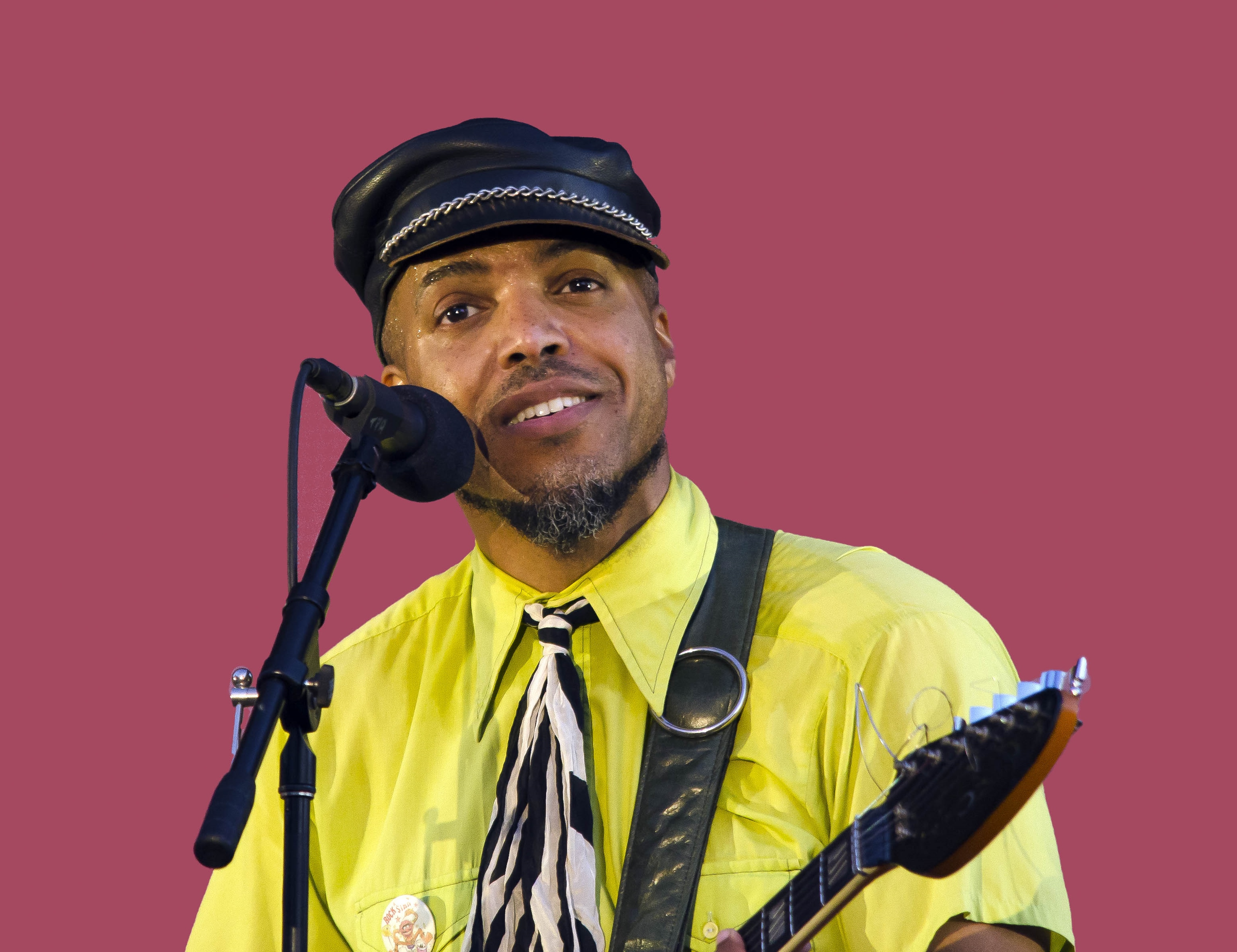
- Van Hunt at Levitt Pavilion Pasadena in Pasadena, California, July 2012

Background information
- Born: Van Hunt Jr. March 8, 1970 (age 56); Dayton, Ohio, U.S.
- Origin: Atlanta, Georgia, U.S.
- Genres: Neo soul, funk, rock
- Occupations: Singer, songwriter, musician, producer
- Instruments: Vocals, guitar, bass, keyboards, drums, saxophone
- Years active: 1997–present
- Labels: Capitol (2001–2006); Blue Note (2007) Godless Hotspot/Thirty Tigers (2011–present)
- Partner: Halle Berry (2020–present; engaged)
- Website: vanhunt.com

Van Hunt Jr. (born March 8, 1970) is an American singer, songwriter, multi-instrumentalist and record producer. He released his debut album, Van Hunt, in 2004, and a follow-up, On the Jungle Floor, in 2006, both on Capitol Records. He won the Grammy Award for Best R&B Performance by a Duo or Group with Vocals for appearing on the tribute version of the Sly & the Family Stone song, "Family Affair", in 2007. He transitioned to Blue Note Records where his 2008 album, Popular, was shelved and was not released until 2017. He self-released the compilation album Use in Case of Emergency in 2009.

== Early life ==
Hunt was born in Dayton, Ohio and grew up with a single mother. His father, Van Hunt Sr., was a friend of Ohio Players drummer Jimmy "Diamond" Williams. Hunt took up the drums at age 7, and saxophone at the age of 8, later adding bass and keyboards. Guitar was the last instrument he learned to play; he played guitar in a rock band called Royalty. Hunt lived in Arlington, Texas for a short time before moving to Atlanta in 1996 to attend Morehouse College, where he studied English, but soon dropped out. In Atlanta, he started producing a few hip-hop demos for Atlanta rappers in order to pay bills. Hunt met up-and-coming record producers and artists like Dallas Austin, Jermaine Dupri and TLC through his work on demos.

== Career ==
=== Early career ===
Hunt wrote and co-produced the song "Hopeless" for singer Dionne Farris, formerly of Arrested Development, and joined her band on guitar and keyboards. "Hopeless" appeared on the soundtrack for the film Love Jones (1997). Hunt co-wrote several songs with Rahsaan Patterson on his album Love in Stereo (1999), and co-wrote with Cree Summer, including the song "Mean Sleep", for her album Street Faërie (1999), produced by Lenny Kravitz. He also collaborated with Joi on the single "Missing You" (2002). Through Dionne Farris, Hunt met A&R person Randy Jackson (who later went on to be a judge on Fox's American Idol). Jackson would become Hunt's manager in 2002.

=== Capitol Records ===
Hunt recorded much of the songs from his debut album in 2000. Producer Dallas Austin took Hunt's recording to Capitol Records, leading him to sign with the label in 2001. Hunt's first album, Van Hunt, was released in February 2004. The album included the singles "Down Here in Hell (With You)", "Dust", and "Seconds of Pleasure", and was nominated for a Grammy Award for Best Urban/Alternative Performance. Hunt's second album, On the Jungle Floor, was released in 2006. The album featured the single, "Character," a revisited "Mean Sleep", as a duet with Nikka Costa, and a cover of "No Sense of Crime" by The Stooges. The album was co-produced by Bill Bottrell. Hunt has toured and appeared with Mary J. Blige, Alicia Keys, Boney James, The Roots, Seal, Angie Stone, Coldplay, The Brand New Heavies, the Dave Matthews Band, and Kanye West.

In 2006, Hunt appeared with Nikka Costa on the Sam Moore album, Overnight Sensational, on the song "If I Had No Loot". Hunt was also featured on "Half the Fun", a track on the Count Bass D album, Act Your Waist Size, released on Fat Beats Records.

In 2007, Hunt won a Grammy Award for Best R&B Performance by a Duo or Group with Vocals, along with John Legend and Joss Stone, for their cover of the Sly & the Family Stone song, "Family Affair", which appeared on the 2006 tribute album Different Strokes by Different Folks. Hunt described winning the award as "one of the bigger pleasures I've had" to The Athens Blur Magazine in 2009.

=== Blue Note ===
Hunt released the 4 track digital EP, The Popular Machine, on August 7, 2007. Hunt announced a full-length album, Popular, to be released on Blue Note Records on January 15, 2008. Hunt moved from Atlanta to Los Angeles in 2007 while the album was nearing completion. Blue Note had taken over Hunt's recording contract after corporate restructuring at Blue Note and Capitol's parent company, EMI. In December 2007, Blue Note announced that they would not be releasing the album, and that Hunt and the label mutually agreed to part ways. Hunt wrote on his MySpace blog in January 2008, that he couldn't promise that Popular would ever be officially released. Blue Note owns the master recordings and opted not to sell it back to him at an affordable price. Hunt commented that he "didn't think that they had enough money" to promote the album properly. LA Weekly called the album an "appealingly trippy fusion of funk grooves, punk guitar and soul vocals", and "a left-field stunner". Hunt told Creative Loafing, an alternative weekly in Atlanta, that he was "devastated" when the label decided not to release the album. In August 2017, Popular finally had an official release on all online distributors 10 years after it was shelved.

=== Independent ===
As of June 2008, Hunt was recording a fourth album, which he planned to release himself and market using the Internet. Hunt has blogged about his new approach on his MySpace page. Hunt toured the U.S. in July and August 2008. Meanwhile, he released Use in Case of Emergency, a compilation of demos, remixes and B-sides recorded between 1997 and 2005, through his Web site in May 2009. In 2009, Hunt performed on the theme song for the film Hurricane Season, entitled "Be on Our Way." Hunt has also been working on autobiographical book of short stories titled Tales of Friction. In July 2009, Hunt told The Atlanta Journal-Constitution that he plans to release one more album and tour once more, but does not know what his plans are after that. Hunt performed at the National Black Arts Festival's tribute to Curtis Mayfield at the Atlanta Symphony Hall on July 16, 2010.

=== Godless Hotspot and What Were You Hoping For? ===
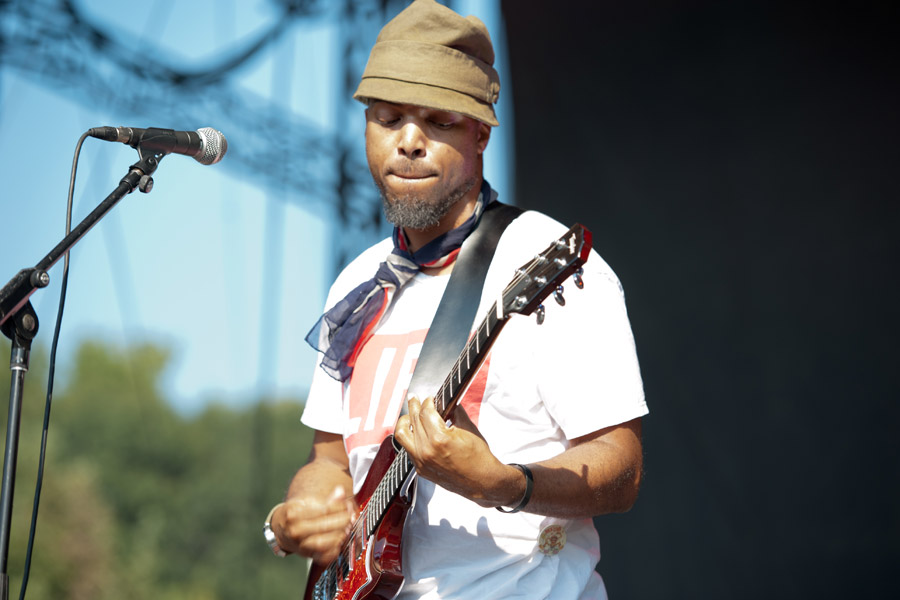
Van Hunt performing at Music Midtown in Atlanta, September 2012.

On June 14, 2011, Van Hunt took to Twitter to announce the release of his first song in 3 years. The song "June" was released on June 15 at midnight via Mike Ragogna of the Huffington Post along with the announcement of the title of his forthcoming album (What were you hoping for?) and its release date. A longer article about the song "June" and the new album and Van's new approach appeared later the same day on the Music remedy website. The article is about the joint venture-between Hunt's own label Godless-hotspot and Thirty Tigers. It said that "June" is the first of a series of free songs which would be released from various sites until the new album came out. The next release will be "eyes Like Pearls" the first official single from the album which was set to be released to radio in July 2011.

=== The Fun Rises, the Fun Sets ===
Van Hunt released updates of work on his upcoming album via PledgeMusic during the course of 2014. In March 2015, he announced the title of his album as The Fun Rises, the Fun Sets, due for release on May 5, 2015. He previewed the release of the new album with the new single "Vega (Stripes On)", which was available for release via iTunes and Amazon and followed this up with another single, "Old Hat". Both tracks had official videos accompany their releases. The album charted at No. 31 on the US Billboard Top R&B/Hip-Hop Albums.

== Influences ==
- David Bowie
- Serge Gainsbourg
- The Isley Brothers
- Curtis Mayfield
- Thelonious Monk
- The Ohio Players
- Iggy Pop
- Prince
- Richard Pryor
- Sly Stone
- Neil Young

== Personal life ==
He has been in a relationship with actress Halle Berry since April 2020. In February 2026, the couple announced their engagement. He is the father of a son named Drake.

== Discography ==
=== Albums ===
- Van Hunt (2004), Capitol
- On the Jungle Floor (2006), Capitol
- What Were You Hoping For? (2011) – Godless Hotspot/Thirty Tigers
- The Fun Rises, the Fun Sets (2015) – Godless Hotspot/Thirty Tigers
- Popular (2017), Blue Note

=== Compilations ===
- Use in Case of Emergency (2009), self-released – collection of outtakes

=== EPs ===
- Acoustic E.P. (2004), Capitol – digital EP
- Napster Sessions (2004), Capitol – digital EP
- Connect Set (2006), Capitol – digital EP
- The Popular Machine (2007), Blue Note – digital EP
- The Lamplighter Series (2009), Blue Note – digital EP

=== Singles ===
- "Down Here in Hell (With You)" (2004), Capitol
- "Dust" (2004), Capitol
- "Seconds of Pleasure" (2004), Capitol
- "Character" (2006), Capitol
- "Being A Girl" (2006), Capitol
- "Eyes Like Pearls" (2011), Godless Hotspot/Thirty Tigers
- "Vega (Stripes On)" (2015), Godless Hotspot/Thirty Tigers
- "Old Hat" (2015), Godless Hotspot/Thirty Tigers
- "Headroom" (2015), Godless Hotspot/Thirty Tigers
- "hopeless (penny witta hole in it)" (2020)
- "Set Your Witches on Fire" (2021)
- "Peachfuzz" (2021) Modern Works Music Publishing
- "Our Love Lingers" (2024), OnTheHuntmusicgroup

== Awards and nominations ==
- 2005 Grammy Award nomination for Best Urban/Alternative Performance for "Dust."
- 2006 Grammy Award win for Best R&B Performance by a Duo Or Group With Vocals for "Family Affair"
