= Football Manager 2009 =

2008 video game

- Developer: Sports Interactive
- Publisher: Sega
- Series: Football Manager
- Platforms: Microsoft Windows, Mac OS X, PlayStation Portable
- Release: EU: 14 November 2008; NA: 18 November 2008
- Genre: Sports management
- Modes: Single player, multiplayer

Football Manager 2009, also known as Worldwide Soccer Manager 2009 in North America, is a football manager simulation video game and the sixth instalment in the Football Manager series. It was released on Microsoft Windows, Mac OS X, and PlayStation Portable on 14 November 2008 in Europe and on 18 November 2008 in North America. The game demo was released on 2 November 2008 via the News of the World, BitTorrent, and Steam. An Arsenal F.C.-branded version of the game was also released.

== Gameplay ==
Football Manager 2009 features similar gameplay to that of the Football Manager series. Gameplay consists of taking charge of a professional football team (the game also includes semi-professional, amateur, and international teams) as the manager. Players can sign football players to contracts, manage finances for the club, and give team talks to players. The Football Manager series is a simulation of real world management, with the player being judged on various factors by the club's AI owners and board. Some of the new features and box art for the game, the first in the series to be released on DVD-ROM rather than on CD-ROM, were announced via a series of videos on 3 September 2008, while other new features were released via a series of podcasts and online blogs.

The main new feature to the game is the 3D match engine. This can now be watched fullscreen, with a widescreen option available. Other features include being able to play as a female or male manager, improvements to the interaction between the manager and his assistant manager, improved mid-match team talks and tactics, training players to have preferred moves, and transfer rumours. There are also be press conferences, where the player can build up a rapport with the journalists, and the finance and transfer systems have been completely reworked. The game is set to feature more players than ever before, with over 350,000 in the database at the time of the game's announcement. The Microsoft Windows version has a skin similar to the one used in Football Manager 2008.

The handheld version includes a 2D match engine for the first time, and the game was shipped with two skins: a light and a dark alternative. The game suffered setbacks on and before launch day, most notably many users found themselves unable to activate the game due to servers providing activation for the DRM system system coming under distributed denial of service attacks.

== Controversy ==
On release, many buyers had problems with the game's copy protection. A printing error on the manuals caused the keys to be difficult to read and there were distributed denial of service attacks on the Uniloc activation servers that prevented purchasers from activating their games. Since the provided telephone activation lines were also run using the activation servers, they were also out of action. In response, SEGA issued a press release apologising for the problems faced by purchasers. As of May 2011, the game could no longer be activated as the website that deals with product activation of Football Manager 2009 was shut down.

== Reception ==
Reception

Aggregate scores
Aggregator	Score
GameRankings	PSP: 83%
Metacritic	PC: 83/100

Review scores
Publication	Score
Eurogamer	8/10
PC Gamer (UK)	69/100
PC PowerPlay	8/10

Football Manager 2009's Microsoft Windows version received a "Platinum" sales award from the Entertainment and Leisure Software Publishers Association (ELSPA), indicating sales of at least 300,000 copies in the United Kingdom. Studio director Miles Jacobson stated that "for every one person that bought Football Manager 2009 there were four who pirated it".

== See also ==
- Business simulation game
- Championship Manager 2009 Express
- Championship Manager 2010
