= Bodycount (video game) =

2011 first-person shooter video game by Codemasters

- Developer: Codemasters Guildford
- Publisher: Codemasters
- Designers: Steve Watt; Stuart Black
- Engine: EGO Engine
- Platforms: PlayStation 3; Xbox 360
- Release: NA: 30 August 2011; AU: 1 September 2011; EU: 2 September 2011
- Genre: First-person shooter
- Modes: Single-player; multiplayer

Bodycount is a 2011 first-person shooter video game for the PlayStation 3 and Xbox 360. It was developed and published by Codemasters. It is considered a spiritual successor to the 2006 video game Black. The player assumes control of Jackson, a former mercenary resolving wars between countries under an organization called the "Network". Like its predecessor, the game utilizes environmental destruction during gameplay. The game also features both cooperative and competitive multiplayer modes. Bodycount garnered mixed reviews upon release. Critics found enjoyable moments in the gameplay and campaign but felt it didn't distinguish itself from other first-person shooters. Because of the game's reception, Codemasters closed their Guildford studio, and cut their studio base by a third.

== Plot ==
Bodycount revolves around Jackson, a former American soldier recruited by the enigmatic "Network", seemingly a private military contractor who resolves international conflicts. On behalf of the Network, Jackson must fight different groups of enemies across the globe including terrorists and enemy mercenaries of the hostile "Target" network. The Target network utilises some advanced science-fiction weaponry and is revealed to be influencing global conflicts. As the plot progresses, Jackson infiltrates and destroys bases of the Target network. The primary antagonist is a female Target mercenary who serves as the final boss. The game has an ambiguous conclusion which seems to imply that the Network has established a dominant influence in global affairs with the destruction of the last Target bases in Lagos and Jiangsu.

== Gameplay ==
The game is set in first-person. One of the main features is environment destructibility; nearly everything in the game is expected to be destructible. Environments and most of everything in them is destroyed realistically, creating a dynamically changing playing environment. By scoring kills, the player can unlock deadly power-ups such as air strikes that further decimate the environment. There is a unique cover system where the player has near complete freedom to aim while in cover.

Multiplayer is available in competitive and cooperative modes. The former offers traditional deathmatch style sessions (individual or team-based) and the latter challenges two players to survive increasingly difficult waves of enemies.

== Reception ==
Reception

Aggregate score
Aggregator	Score	
Aggregator	PS3	Xbox 360
Metacritic	50/100	53/100

Review scores
Publication	Score	
Publication	PS3	Xbox 360
Destructoid	N/A	5/10
Edge	N/A	4/10
Eurogamer	N/A	4/10
Game Informer	5/10	5/10
GamePro	2/5	2/5
GameSpot	5.5/10	5.5/10
GameTrailers	N/A	5/10
Giant Bomb	2/5	2/5
IGN	6/10	6/10
Joystiq	N/A	2/5
Official Xbox Magazine (US)	N/A	6.5/10
PlayStation: The Official Magazine	7/10	N/A
The Daily Telegraph	N/A	2.5/5
The Guardian	N/A	3/5

Bodycount received "mixed" reviews on both platforms according to video game review aggregator Metacritic. As a result of very mixed reception, Codemasters closed down their Guildford studio, laying off 70 employees and cutting down Codemasters' studio base by a third.

The Guardian gave the Xbox 360 version a score of three stars out of five, saying that the game "isn't the future of first-person shooters. But it is great fun". The Daily Telegraph gave the same version two-and-a-half stars out of five, saying that it "professes to be a reaction to overblown, scripted rollercoaster FPSes, but never manages to bring a whole lot to the table for itself. Bodycount even makes a fuss over destructible cover, which was done better by Battlefield: Bad Company. Bodycount is not a poor game, just a confused and unremarkable one, even if those instant restarts really are wonderful". However, The Digital Fix gave the same version four out of ten, calling it "an ill conceived, poorly constructed, seemingly rushed mess which isn't fun and in no way warrants its full price tag. It's all been done before and a hell of a lot better, many times - keep your cash in your wallet (or purse)". 411Mania gave the PlayStation 3 version a score of three out of ten, saying that it "had a ton of potential. There are a few moments in the campaign that are quite fun and enjoyable but that isn't enough to make this a great game by any means. Overall, it lacks in almost every area. It should have taken a note from 'Bulletstorm' and focused on fun, over-the-top kills and detailed maps instead of trying to do everything perfect. The game lacked in almost all areas and I cannot say this was an overall enjoyable experience".
