= Black (video game) =

2006 video game

- European cover art
- Developer: Criterion Games
- Publisher: Electronic Arts
- Producer: Jeremy Chubb
- Designer: Craig Sullivan
- Programmer: Sean Murray
- Writer: Adrian Vershinin
- Composers: Chris Tilton; Michael Giacchino
- Engine: RenderWare
- Platforms: PlayStation 2; Xbox
- Release: EU: 24 February 2006; NA: 28 February 2006
- Genre: First-person shooter
- Mode: Single-player

Black is a 2006 first-person shooter game developed by Criterion Games and published by Electronic Arts (EA) for the PlayStation 2 and Xbox. The player assumes control of Jack Kellar, a US Army special forces soldier being interrogated about his previous missions involving a terrorist operation. Gameplay involves players fighting terrorists by using firearms and grenades. The game is notable and was heavily promoted for its large focus on destructive effects and explosions during gameplay, as well as its cinema-inspired action and sound quality.

Black received positive reviews upon release. Critics praised the gameplay, sound design and presentation, but criticized the game's short length and lack of a multiplayer mode. Despite Criterion's desire to develop a sequel, creative differences with Electronic Arts ultimately ended plans for one. As such a spiritual successor, Bodycount, was created by some of the same development team at Codemasters and released in 2011.

== Plot ==
Black is set in Ingushetia and Chechnya, Republics of Russia. The protagonist is Sergeant First Class Jack Kellar (Marty Papazian), an inadequately disciplined member of a Central Intelligence Agency (CIA) black ops unit. The unknown interrogator (Paul Pape) questions Kellar about an arms trafficking terrorist organization named the Seventh Wave who have been responsible for a number of terrorist attacks and homicides. The interrogator explains that, unless Keller co-operates, he and his actions will be declassified, meaning he will be convicted at court-martial, dishonorably discharged, and imprisoned for life. Though initially resistant, Kellar agrees to tell his story.

Four days earlier, Kellar and his military unit were attacking a Seventh Wave fortification in the city of Veblensk. Kellar kills three high-ranking members of the cell but then disobeys orders by rushing inside a terrorist controlled building, where a mercenary suddenly ambushes him. However, this mercenary did not kill Kellar, who learns the man is an American, William Lennox, a former CIA wetwork operative. After faking his own death in Cairo, Egypt, Lennox has become the leader of Seventh Wave.

Kellar's next mission is to cross the border into Treneska and traverse the Vlodnik Canal to destroy a base and weapons cache. He then meets a female black ops soldier named MacCarver (Cree Summer), the commander of black ops Team Bravo, after fighting a wave of terrorists at a farmhouse. Kellar and MacCarver then move to destroy an arms factory in the city of Nazran. To complete the mission, they must navigate an old cemetery and town, both heavily defended. After doing so, they assault the town's iron foundry, destroying its productive capacity. They then meet a third member of the team, Solomon.

They learn that Valencio, one of the four bosses of Seventh Wave, is hiding in Tivliz Asylum. The team decide to attack the asylum yard, with Keller rushing into the asylum despite Solomon protesting that their order is to hold. Keller finds Valencio after blowing up a concrete machine gun nest and briefly interrogates him for Lennox's location.

Based on information gathered from the mission, Team Bravo proceeds to a well-defended dockyard, clears the area, and moves to link up with Alpha Team. Alpha Team, however, is wiped out in an ambush while Lennox escapes. In light of the disastrous result, the operation is declared cancelled. Despite this, Kellar leads a retaliatory assault against the Graznei Bridge before leaving his team at the gates of Lennox's compound to penetrate the defenses both around and inside the Spetriniv Gulag. During the attack, Keller triggers an explosion resulting from the destruction of two concrete barricades, and subsequent explosions in the final room of the underground bunker, presumably killing Lennox.

The interrogator then reveals to Kellar that authorities had, in fact, always known of Lennox's involvement in Seventh Wave. Kellar had acted predictably, doing what his profile said he would, while his pursuit of Lennox was both expected and welcome – but Lennox is not in fact dead. Kellar is told that a false "death" in a car crash has been arranged for him to provide cover so he could continue his pursuit of Lennox. The game ends with Kellar being told to get ready for his next assignment.

== Gameplay ==
The player, armed with a SPAS-12, faces multiple enemies on the Naszran Foundry chapter. The red crescents in the center of the screen indicate that he is taking damage from multiple angles

The gameplay is essentially a straightforward first-person shooter. Players can only carry two weapons at a time; therefore, strategy is needed when choosing weaponry, with weapons differing in characteristics. The player can also carry grenades, which can be thrown without switching weapons. Land mines and grenades can be detonated prematurely by shooting them.

The game is mission-based, with each mission separated by a cutscene video. On harder difficulties, there are more objectives that must be completed before the player can progress. These extra objectives involved collecting various intelligence documents, blueprints, or destroying parts of the environment. These are all indicated by the HUD cross-hair changing color when the player points at the relevant object.

Successful completion of the objectives over all missions in all difficulties above 'Easy' results in the awarding of Silver Weapons (infinite bullets) and unlocking the M16-A2 (40mm underslung grenade launcher attachment) as the starting default weapon with infinite 40mm grenades. When unlocked, these features are permanent and cannot be removed without starting a fresh storyline.

== Development ==
Criterion intended to "do for shooting what Burnout did for racing - tear it apart", with dual emphasis on destructible environments and the handling and behavior of real-world firearms. Bullets that hit buildings, terrain and objects leave visible damage; moreover, the guns are rendered with great detail and accuracy, though some weapons' features are stylized or exaggerated. The emphasis on the appearance, function, and sounds of the weapons led the developer to label the game as "Gun-Porn". Another notable and original feature is the use of real-time blur while reloading, giving a depth of field and more perspective to the game. Similarly, when the player drops below two bars of health, the screen turns black and white, the sound of the character's heartbeat become the dominant noise and the game goes into slow motion, and the large and small motors in the control pads match the sound of systolic and diastolic part of the heartbeat. The game was not developed with an overarching plot structure in mind and this was implemented as something of an afterthought towards the end of development. The initial idea for relating the plot in-game came from Black's director, Alex Ward, who wanted to have a radio-play-style voiceover spoken over a 'black' screen.

Black was added to the Xbox Backwards Compatible program in 2018, making it playable on Xbox One and the Xbox Series X and Series S.

=== Sound ===
Emphasizing the game's action film heritage, sound effects for the weapons in the game were based on various sounds from films. For example, Bruce Willis' Heckler & Koch MP5 in Die Hard (1989), Jack Bauer's pistol in 24 (2001–2010), and Arnold Schwarzenegger's Uzi in True Lies (1994).

Realizing in the chaos of a heavy gun battle the heavy mix of sound and music would produce a cacophony of noise, the sound designers developed the "choir of guns" concept. Whereas, traditionally in a shooter game, each weapon model would be assigned a different sound, Black assigns each enemy their own "voice", similar to the way in which each member of a choir would have their own distinct voice. For example, there are three enemies firing, one would be assigned a low voice, another a medium voice, and the third a high voice. This allows all the weapons being fired in any particular scene to harmonize and deliver a distinct sound for the game. Black's sound was nominated for Best Audio at the 2006 BAFTA Video Games Awards, and won Best Art & Sound jointly with Burnout Revenge (another game by Criterion) at the 2006 Develop Industry Excellence Awards.

The music for Black was composed by Chris Tilton, using a theme co-authored with Academy Award-winning composer Michael Giacchino. It was recorded at the Newman Scoring Stage.

== Reception ==
Reception

Aggregate score
Aggregator	Score	
Aggregator	PS2	Xbox
Metacritic	79/100	77/100

Review scores
Publication	Score	
Publication	PS2	Xbox
1Up.com	B−	N/A
Edge	8/10	8/10
Electronic Gaming Monthly	6.83/10	6.83/10
Eurogamer	8/10	N/A
Famitsu	32/40	N/A
Game Informer	8.5/10	8.5/10
GamePro	4/5	4/5
GameRevolution	C+	C+
GameSpot	7.4/10	7.4/10
GameSpy	4/5	4/5
GameTrailers	8.6/10	8.6/10
GameZone	8.4/10	8.7/10
IGN	8.7/10	8.6/10
Official U.S. PlayStation Magazine	4/5	N/A
Official Xbox Magazine (US)	N/A	7/10
Detroit Free Press	N/A	3/4
The Times	4/5	4/5

Black received "favorable" reviews on both platforms according to video game review aggregator Metacritic.

Black's PlayStation 2 version received a "Gold" sales award from the Entertainment and Leisure Software Publishers Association (ELSPA), indicating sales of at least 200,000 copies in the United Kingdom.

In Japan, Famitsu gave the PS2 version all four eights, for a total of 32 out of 40. The Times also gave the game four stars out of five and stated: "As the entire game is played at fever-pitch, you soon find yourself looking forward to the next mission briefing, if only for a chance to catch your breath. The only mystery to Black is why there is no multiplayer mode, since such intense battle settings would make for great competitive bouts". The Sydney Morning Herald similarly gave it four stars out of five, saying: "Little strategy is required for each stage, with abundant health packs and aggressive opponents of little intelligence. But there are many strategies and the use of cover is vital". Detroit Free Press gave the Xbox version three stars out of four and said: "The action is intense and the effects are splendid, though the un-reality applies also to the worlds in which you battle". The A.V. Club gave the game a C+, stating that it was worth playing for "six hours. Pretty good hours, but still, The A.V. Club can't stress that number enough"; and added "that was awesome for Doom, a free download with 16 extra maps available after registration. But 40 bucks for Black's eight levels, with no multiplayer mode, and unlockable difficulty settings the only incentive to replay? The question is really whether renting this lovely oversized tech demo is worth a whole weekend".

During the 10th Annual Interactive Achievement Awards, the Academy of Interactive Arts & Sciences nominated Black for "First-Person Action Game of the Year" and "Outstanding Achievement in Original Music Composition".

In 2013, IGN listed the game at 99 in the list of "Top 100 Shooters".

== Future ==
In an interview, co-creator and designer Stuart Black revealed that plans for a sequel were underway, but were scrapped due to differences with Electronic Arts. Stuart Black and many of the developers of Black worked on Bodycount, a spiritual successor to the game which, developed by Codemasters, was released on the PlayStation 3 and Xbox 360 in 2011.
