= Championship Manager 2008 =

2007 video game

- Developer: Beautiful Game Studios
- Publisher: Eidos Interactive
- Series: Championship Manager
- Platforms: Microsoft Windows, Mac OS X
- Release: Windows: EU: 2007-11-02; NA: 2007-11-06; AU: 2007-11-29; Mac OS X 16 November 2007
- Genre: Sports management
- Modes: Single player, multiplayer

Championship Manager 2008 is football management simulation video game in Eidos Interactive's Championship Manager series. It is available for Microsoft Windows and Mac, and there is no PlayStation Portable version as there was in Championship Manager 2007. The game was released on 2 November 2007.

== Features ==
Users can now play in a multi-player mode, meaning that they can have more than one person on an account. Furthermore, users can manage nations and can apply "Club Benefactor", which lets the user have more money, although these additions were added in the previous Championship Manager. Another feature is the addition of more leagues like the Australian League, player tendencies, and team talks. The game uses ProZone tool to give a comprehensive database of player statistics.

== Reaction ==
Reception

Aggregate score
| Aggregator | Score |
|---|---|
| Metacritic | 68/100 |

Review scores
| Publication | Score |
|---|---|
| Eurogamer | 7/10 |
| GameSpot | 6/10 |

Championship Manager 2008 received average reviews but was criticised by GameSpot because it "ultimately fails because it doesn't seem to know who it's aiming at", and gave it a score of "6". PC Gamer UK gave the game 72 out of 100 while Ferrango gave it 45 out of 100.

== Other versions ==
A mobile version of the game, titled Championship Manager 2008 Mobile, was developed in 2008 by Dynamo Games, a mobile games and BAFTA award-winning publisher.

== See also ==
- Football Manager 2008
