= Van Hunt (album) =

Studio album by Van Hunt
- Released: February 24, 2004
- Recorded: 2003; Various recording locations
- Genres: R&B, funk, neo soul
- Length: 54:45
- Label: Capitol
- Producers: Van Hunt (also exec.), Randy Jackson (exec.), Andrew Slater (also exec.), Howard Willing

Van Hunt chronology
Van Hunt (2004)	On the Jungle Floor (2006)

Professional ratings
Review scores
Source	Rating
Allmusic	3.5/5 stars
BBC Music	favorable
Robert Christgau	B+
Entertainment Weekly	A
Mojo	4/5 stars
The New York Times	favorable
Paste	favorable
PopMatters	favorable
Rolling Stone	3.5/5 stars
Spin	B+
The Village Voice	mixed

Van Hunt is the debut album of R&B singer-songwriter Van Hunt, released on February 24, 2004, by Capitol Records. Recording sessions for the album took place at Capitol Records, Westlake Audio, Sunset Sound, Sage & Sound Studio, and Zac Recording in Los Angeles, House of Blues in Memphis, and The Sound Kitchen in Nashville.

The album charted at number 38 on the US Billboard Top R&B/Hip-Hop Albums and number 14 on the Billboard Top Heatseekers. The single "Dust" was nominated for a Grammy Award for Best Urban/Alternative Performance in 2005.

== Composition ==
Music journalist Will Hermes notes "sublimely janky '80s synths and melodies that jab and slide" on the album's songs. Rolling Stone's Ernest Hardy finds Hunt's vocal style similar to those of Prince, Curtis Mayfield, and Marvin Gaye, and comments that the album's music evokes influences such as the Beatles, Muddy Waters, and Sly Stone. Neil Drumming of Entertainment Weekly perceives a lack of melisma in Hunt's singing, writing that he sings "clearly and crisply and sav[es] the crests and falls for the swirling synths, slick guitars, and percolating bass lines."

The album's subject matter is droll, stark, and confessional, and focuses on the pains of love, romance, and sex. Songs such as "Anything (To Get Your Attention)" and "Down Here (In Hell with You)" deal with dysfunctional relationships. On the latter track, Hunt asks "What would I do if we were perfect / Where would I go for disappointment?" "Highlights" has him musing on a failed affair, as he uses a metaphor: "Old lovers turned critics curse at you on the silver screen". "Precious" features a predominant Prince influence.

== Reception ==
Thanks to the success of artists like India.Arie and Alicia Keys, the term neo soul has become a marketable genre and the major record labels have spent the last couple of years putting their dwindling resources into the search for the next cool cat. Van Hunt was worth the money.

— Nic Harcourt, The New York Times

Ernest Hardy of Rolling Stone found the album to have "no duds" and stated, "Unlike his neosoul brethren, [Hunt] wraps his seamlessly quilted voice around wry, off-kilter lyrics; his skewed views on love and life are wholly his. [...] The bar has been raised." Mojo called it "a remarkably coherent and focused album" and stated, There's real substance and soulfulness to be found".

== Track listing ==
# Title	Writer(s)	Length
1. "Dust"	Van Hunt	4:13
2. "Seconds Of Pleasure"	Hunt	5:40
3. "Hello, Goodbye"	Hunt, Curtis Whitehead	4:24
4. "Down Here (In Hell With You)"	Hunt	4:49
5. "What Can I Say (For Millicent)"	Hunt	4:45
6. "Anything (To Get Your Attention)"	Hunt, Whitehead	3:27
7. "Highlights"	Hunt	5:34
8. "Precious"	Hunt	4:29
9. "Her December"	Hunt	4:15
10. "Hold My Hand"	Hunt, Whitehead	3:49
11. "Who Will Love Me In Winter"	Hunt	4:14
12. "Out Of The Sky"	Hunt, Whitehead	5:08

== Personnel ==
Credits adapted from liner notes.

- Van Hunt – arranger, producer, vocals, guitars, bass guitar, drums, keyboards, piano
- Jermaine Rand (guitar)
- Wendy Melvoin – guitar
- Chris Whitehead (guitar)
- Terry McMillen (harmonica)
- Daryl Richards (alto saxophone)
- Daniel Solammon [misspelled as Daniel Solomon] (tenor saxophone)
- Curtis Whitehead (tenor saxophone)
- Nolan Smith (trumpet)
- Isaac Curtis (trombone)
- Truth (Wurlitzer piano, Moog synthesizer)
- Dwight Farrell (celeste)
- Patrick Warren (Mellotron)
- Larry James (drums, percussion)
- Nick Northern (drums, percussion, background vocals)
- Amy White – background vocals
- Ta Ta (background vocals)
- Andrew Slater – producer
- Howard Willing – producer

• Dave Way- mixing

- Tim LeBlanc – mixing
- Peter Mokran – mixing
- Melissa Mattey – mixing

== Charts ==
Chart (2004)	Peak position
U.S. Billboard Top R&B/Hip-Hop Albums	38
