= Football Manager 2008 =

2007 video game

- Developer: Sports Interactive
- Publisher: Sega
- Series: Football Manager
- Platforms: Microsoft Windows, Mac OS X, Xbox 360, PlayStation Portable
- Release: Microsoft Windows, Mac OS X: EU: 18 October 2007; NA/AU: 25 October 2007 Xbox 360: March 2008
- Genre: Sports management
- Modes: Single player, multiplayer

Football Manager 2008, also known as Worldwide Soccer Manager 2008 in North America and Fútbol Manager 2008 in South America, is a football management simulation video game and the fourth instalment in the Football Manager series developed by Sports Interactive and published by Sega. It was released in October 2007 for Microsoft Windows, Mac OS X, and PlayStation Portable and in March 2008 for Xbox 360. The demo for Football Manager 2008 was released on 30 September 2007. There are over 5,000 playable teams from more than 50 countries.

Football Manager 2008 was the last Football Manager game to be released on the Xbox 360 and the last to be released on an Xbox console for thirteen years until Football Manager 2021 was released on the Xbox One, Xbox Series X, and Xbox Series S on 1 December 2020. The game was succeeded by Football Manager 2009. Originally intended to be released on 19 October 2007, due to early shipments by many retailers carrying their game, Sports Interactive moved the release date of Football Manager 2008 to 18 October 2007.

== Gameplay ==
Football Manager 2008 features similar gameplay to that of the Football Manager series. Gameplay consists of taking charge of a professional football team (the game also includes semi-professional, amateur, and international teams) as the manager. Players can sign football players to contracts, manage finances for the club, and give team talks to players. The Football Manager series is a simulation of real world management, with the player being judged on various factors by the club's AI owners and board. Football Manager 2008 includes new features, including an advisor system, similar to how assistant managers work, and a new finance system.

About licences, Miles Jacobson of Sports Interactive said: "We are very proud to announce the procurement of a licence for the French Ligue de Football Professionnel, with both the 1st & 2nd divisions covered by the licence that provides real club names, logo's and kits for all the clubs in those leagues. We also welcome back the Dutch national team to the game, which was missing from last years [sic] game. On top of this, we have new licences in Italy from Sampdoria and Fiorentina."

== Reception ==
Reception

Aggregate scores
Aggregator	Score
GameRankings	PC: 82% PSP: 78% X360: 77%
Metacritic	PC: 86/100

Football Manager 2008's Microsoft Windows version received a "Platinum" sales award from the Entertainment and Leisure Software Publishers Association (ELSPA), indicating sales of at least 300,000 copies in the United Kingdom.

== See also ==
- Business simulation game
- Championship Manager 2008
