= Dynamo Games =

Scottish video game developer and publisher

Dynamo Gaming
- Type: Video game developer
- Industry: Video games
- Founded: 2004
- Defunct: 2012
- Headquarters: Dundee, Scotland, United Kingdom
- Products: Football Tycoon
- Website: www.dynamogames.com

Dynamo Games Ltd was an independent video game developer and publisher based in Dundee, Scotland. Established in 2004, it developed titles for the Google Android mobile operating system. Besides developing games for various handheld formats, Dynamo launched several applications for mobile phones using Java technology.

The company has a focus on developing sports titles and had translated several television franchises into the mobile phone format. Notable achievements include the BAFTA award-winning mobile version of Championship Manager 2007.

Dynamo Games was a certified member of the UK game industry trade association The Independent Games Developers Association (TIGA).

As of 16 February 2009, Dynamo Games became an officially approved developer for the Nintendo DS, Wii, and Wiiware. As of April 2009, Dynamo was developing its series of then new but unnamed titles for these Nintendo formats.

== History ==
Stuart Reid, Brian McNicoll, and Stuart Anderson all met while studying Applied Computing at the University of Dundee. They graduated in July 2003 and started Dynamo Computing Solutions.

In 2004, Dynamo Games was established following the development of several successful mobile titles released under the Dynamo Computing Solutions name. Since then, the company has gone on to receive several industry awards and has produced a range of critically acclaimed titles.

The developer is based in the city of Dundee, which itself is located in the Tayside region of Scotland. In 2010, the company switched its focus to social games.

== Dynamo Sports ==
In February 2009, Dynamo Games launched a dedicated brand for its line of sports titles named Dynamo Sports. The series started with developing the Independent Games Festival award-nominated Football Tycoon.

== Games ==
- Mobi-Mechanic
- Mobi-Medic
- Championship Manager 2005 solo
- Championship Manager 2006
- Countdown
- Championship Manager 2007 Mobile
- Championship Manager 2008
- The Crystal Maze Mobile
- Football Tycoon
- Championship Manager 2009 Express
- Championship Manager 2010
- Dizzy Drops
- The Crystal Maze iPhone/iPod touch
- Championship Manager Legends 70s
- Championship Manager Legends 80s
- Soccer Tycoon
- Championship Manager 2011
- Beauty Town
- Tracer Cities
- Golf Squared
- Outpost 2:Black Sun
