= Championship Manager 2009 Express =

2009 video game

- Developer(s): Dynamo Games
- Publisher(s): Eidos Interactive
- Platform(s): iOS
- Release: 1 May 2009
- Genre(s): Sports, strategy

Championship Manager 2009 Express is football management simulation video game released on 1 May 2009 for the iOS by Eidos Interactive, and developed by Dynamo Games.

== Premise ==
The Championship Manager series lets players assume managerial control over their favourite football club in a bid for both league and tournament victory. The series has always featured real-life clubs and players adding a degree of authenticity to how well certain teams and players perform.

== Features ==
Example of a match being played out on screen

As with each new entry into the handheld series developed by Dynamo Games, Championship Manager 2009 Express expands both the managerial options available to the player and new aesthetic qualities, allowing better ease of control and menu navigation. Individual player training is new to this version and allows users to focus specific training routines on key players to give them a competitive edge in crucial matches, while past installments offered full-team routines only.

Like past entries to the series, matches play out in 2D on-screen and can be sped up or slowed down to suit the player's preference. This version allows users to view matches in real-time and change tactics or make substitutions at any time if they feel their current strategies are not working. Board members will influence investment into the player's chosen club. Managers can set themselves targets throughout each season that will affect the level of funds provided by the board.

Full promotion and relegation means that managers can be completely relegated out of their chosen league and dropped into the non-leagues, or sacked from their team if the board decides. Press conferences take players to task for their actions if performance is poor. Users may be put on the spot and asked to explain their managerial decisions.
