= What Were You Hoping For? =

Studio album by Van Hunt
- Released: September 27, 2011
- Recorded: 2008–11
- Studio: Santa Fe Tracking Station (Los Angeles)
- Genres: Psychedelic soul; rock
- Length: 43:32
- Labels: Godless Hotspot; Thirty Tigers
- Producer: Van Hunt

Van Hunt chronology
On the Jungle Floor (2006)	What Were You Hoping For? (2011)

Singles from What Were You Hoping For?
- 1. "Eyes Like Pearls" Released: September 9, 2011

What Were You Hoping For? is the third studio album by American singer-songwriter and multi-instrumentalist Van Hunt. It was released on September 27, 2011, by his independent label Godless Hotspot in a joint venture with distributor Thirty Tigers.

The album is the follow-up to Hunt's 2006 record On the Jungle Floor and follows a period of label conflict and mainstream obscurity for Hunt. Written and produced entirely by the singer, What Were You Hoping For? was recorded in sessions at the Los Angeles studio Santa Fe Tracking Station. Hunt applied a minimalist recording approach and worked with a backing band comprising drummer Ruth Price, percussionist Melissa Mattey, and keyboardist Peter Dyer.

The album expands on his previous music's blend of R&B and rock music forms. Hunt sought to achieve a rawer musical aesthetic and incorporated rough rhythms, rock dynamics, and studio effects. Inspired by his experience in Los Angeles at the onset of the late-2000s recession, the album's subject matter deals with contemporary societal issues and dissonance in modern life. Music journalists have noted the album's predominantly rock style, incorporation of funk and soul, eccentric songs, varying musical structure, and Hunt's eclectic vocal range.

What Were You Hoping For? received rave reviews from critics, who praised its musical direction, Hunt's performance, and his songwriting. However, it received some backlash from Hunt's fanbase for its stylistic departure from his past work. The album produced one single, "Eyes Like Pearls", and performed modestly on music charts, reaching number 50 on the Billboard Top R&B/Hip-Hop Albums. Hunt promoted the album with a nationwide concert tour from September to October 2011, accompanied by Price and Dyer in his live band.

== Background ==
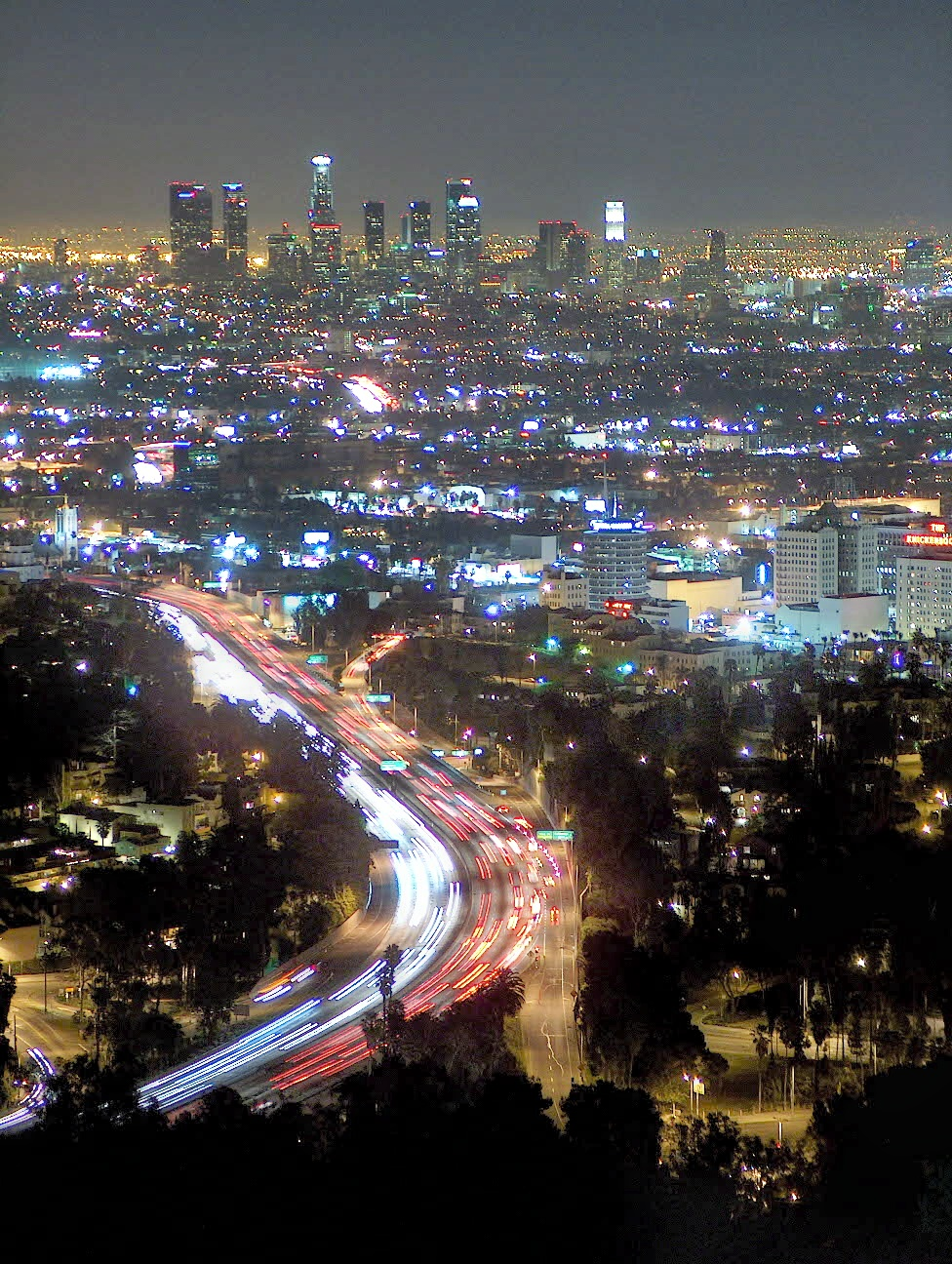
Hunt's relocation to Los Angeles (skyline pictured) inspired What Were You Hoping For?

In 2006, Hunt released his second album On the Jungle Floor to critical success, but little commercial notice, despite a costly marketing campaign by his label Capitol Records. After corporate restructuring by Capitol's parent label EMI, his contract was taken over by another EMI label, Blue Note Records. Hunt subsequently went to work on his first project for Blue Note, entitled Popular. Characterized by him as "an edgy, funk kind of rock record", Hunt approached the album with a more aggressive, rock-inspired direction, with music that was less conventional than on his previous albums. Upon the album's completion in 2007, Hunt decided to relocate from his native Atlanta, Georgia to Los Angeles, California in order to advance his career in the music industry, as well as pursue a relationship there with a woman.

Scheduled for a January 2008 release, Popular was promoted with five months of concert performances by Hunt, press coverage, and the release of promotional copies, including the four-song EP The Popular Machine (2007) and advance CDs for the media and radio people. However, weeks before its scheduled release, the album was shelved by Blue Note, with whom Hunt had been experiencing differences, and they subsequently parted ways. Blue Note had felt that the album was not profitable enough to release. Hunt could not release Popular himself without repaying the project's costs back to EMI and obtaining rights to the album's master recordings. According to him, EMI requested twice the original costs, and in his opinion, the money for promoting Popular was not "strategically spent well" by the label. Hunt discussed the situation in an interview for Creative Loafing, saying that "They opted to not sell it to me at a price that I could afford. They've got it and I'm sure they'll come out with it when they deem it necessary and profitable." Of his decision to relocate to Los Angeles, he later quipped, "Here I am, and the relationship has done much better than the career."

With his career on hold, Hunt continued recording new songs and demos, posting them on his MySpace page, while Popular gained exposure among listeners through online music sharing. In 2009, he released the compilation album Use in Case of Emergency as a free download through his website. It featured previously unreleased material recorded by Hunt prior to Popular. He also continued touring, worked on an autobiographical book of short stories, entitled Tales of Friction, and studied classical piano. Hunt also took up photography after his girlfriend purchased him a camera. He started out on the streets of Los Angeles, where he photographed subjects on street corners and discarded objects, including furniture and numerous couches he found abandoned on the streets. In an interview for PopMatters, he explained how his photographying of people there inspired him: "It's sad as you can quite imagine. It's also kind of welcoming to me. Sometimes I do get a chance to talk to them and hear a bit of their story. I'm not the only one out here who had an idea of trying to make it happen. Some of us are luckier than others. Some of us are more prepared than others. That's just the truth of the situation." Along with photography, he was stimulated creatively after reading Legs McNeil's 1997 book Please Kill Me: The Uncensored Oral History of Punk and relating to its themes of artistic frustration and rebelliousness.

In a 2009 interview for The Atlanta Journal-Constitution, Hunt discussed working as an independent artist, stating "Creatively it is certainly liberating, but the rest of it is really not that fun. I wanted a happy medium between the system of recording, marketing and distribution which I think is very important to any product you want to bring to market ... but I never had that with the record industry. Now that I'm on the other side of it trying to be the artist and the industry, I realize what the importance of the system was, but I also realize there was a lot that was missing since it is basically dying now." He also said that he intends on recording another album "at least one more time and then go on tour, and then I don't know."

== Recording and production ==
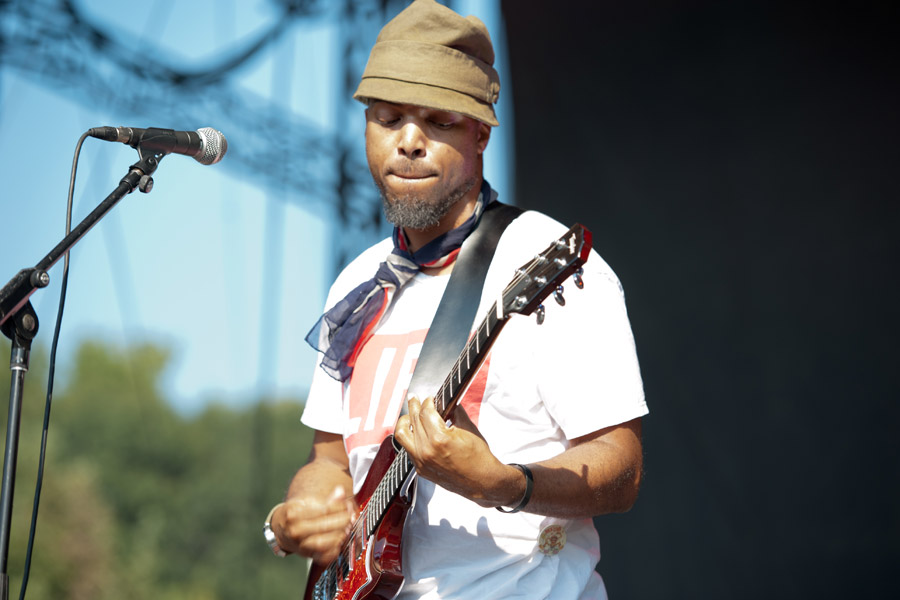
Hunt (pictured in 2012) pursued a raw guitar sound for the album.

Hunt began working on tracks for a follow-up project in 2008. Two songs from those sessions, "Moving Targets" and "Eyes Like Pearls", were included on What Were You Hoping For?. After setting up his own label in 2009, Hunt began a new process for What Were You Hoping For?, writing and recording songs for 10 months. In an interview for the Chicago Tribune, he said of his expectations for the album's recording: "I really wasn't sure what it would wind up being sonically. I love Bach cello suites, I love punk music, I love old blues, negro spiritual quartets, Muddy Waters' 'You Need Love.' There is a simplicity but also a bite that connects all that music, from the growl in the cello to the timbre in Muddy's voice. I wanted simple music, but with bite, over which I could lay my lyrical shenanigans."

Hunt played several instruments, including guitar, keyboards, drums, bass synthesizer, and the electronic drum. When he finished writing and recording the demos, Hunt began the album's primary recording sessions at Santa Fe Tracking Station in Los Angeles. With What Were You Hoping For?, Hunt pursued a "harder edge" and rawer aesthetic than featured on his previous work. He also wanted to explore a self-described "gnarly" guitar sound inspired by the work of Muddy Waters and The Stooges' 1973 album Raw Power. Hunt attempted the sound in the past, but encountered discouragement from management. He discussed his direction for the album in an interview for The Boombox, stating "[I]t wasn't necessarily punk music. It was more about trying to capture the growl of a cello. That to me is as nasty as it can get. That's a beautiful sound to me. When people talk about the distortion on the guitar, I hear the same thing with that growl of a cello." Hunt wanted to take advantage of his newfound feeling of artistic freedom and lack of concern over marketability.

Hunt approached the recording sessions differently than on his previous records. Rather than guiding personnel through replicating his demos for the album, he allowed members of his backing band to improvise their parts. For most songs, Hunt recorded with drummer Ruth Price, percussionist and engineer Melissa Mattey, and keyboardist and programmer Peter Dyer. Price and Dyer had auditioned for him at the Musicians Institute in Hollywood and had previously toured with Hunt. He rehearsed with Price for approximately two weeks before recording the final tracks in order to adjust to more rock-based dynamics, including a different set of tempos, chord changes, and faster time cadences, that he wanted for the songs. Price was adept in playing both loose and tight drumming styles for certain songs. Hunt and his band were inspired by recording artists Curtis Mayfield and Iggy Pop, who he said "brought this kind of intelligence along with the rawness. It was really bold. They just didn't give a shit. I was like, that's the attitude that I'm feeling right now. I feel like I've finally shed the music that I grew up with."

They subsequently recorded basic tracks, and Hunt approached Peter Dyer to create a backing soundscape for the tracks. What Were You Hoping For? was later mixed by Melissa Mattey. Hunt has cited its minimalist recording process as his "most hands off approach ... thus far on an album", calling the approach "musically adept but also stringently unique. People might describe it as futuristic."

== Music and lyrics ==
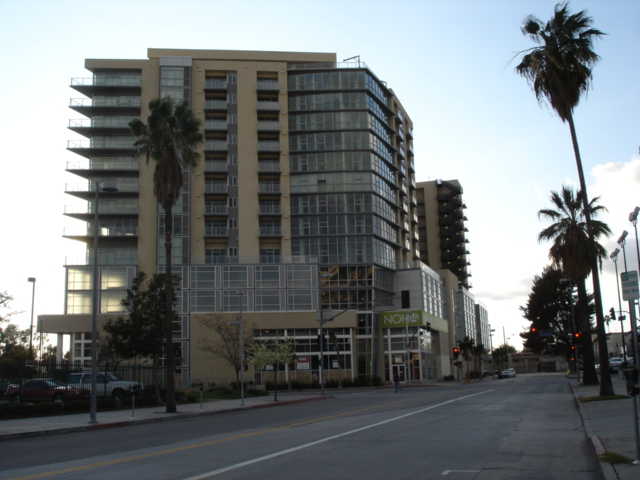
Certain songs were inspired by the recession-stricken North Hollywood district (NoHo 14 apartments pictured).

Expanding on his previous work's blend of R&B and rock music forms, What Were You Hoping For? incorporates hard rock, lively funk, sparse ballads, and elements of soul, punk rock, and progressive rock. The music has a loose feel, with grittier guitar and more low fidelity production than on Hunt's previous albums. The album's songs are primarily guitar-based and contain jagged, rumbling rhythms, loose guitar riffs, funk licks, and studio effects, including an abundant use of reverb. Their musical structures are characterized by eccentric arrangements, shifting melodies, and rhythms that vary at offbeat intervals. The songs also feature tense, aggressive soundscapes with sonic influences derived from 1960s psychedelic music and 1970s rock music. Jim Farber from the New York Daily News notes the prevalence of rock music on the album and describes its music as "a surrealist's notion of soul: prog-rock swayed by R&B ... Lots of songs have the skewed melodic structures of '70s Zappa, tempered by '80s Red Hot Chili Peppers." Geraud Blanks of the Milwaukee Journal Sentinel characterizes the album's music as "an amalgamation of Prince's psychedelic funk, Jimi Hendrix rock and Curtis Mayfield soul". Hunt's falsetto vocals on the album feature silky timbre and style. He sings in a variety of musical modes on the songs.

Hunt's songwriting on the album is characterized by resolute lyrics, multi-layered storylines, social commentary, a droll perspective, poetic subtlety, thematic subtext, and whimsy. Songs on the album are unified by a theme of tension and dissonance in modern life. The songs explore topics and issues in contemporary society and culture, including gentrification, identity politics, and mass consumption, accompanied by a sense of hope in Hunt's lyrics. Hunt explains the album to have a "loose concept", with songs unified by subject matter concerning "unspoken issues around society", and says of his lyrical sentiments on the album, "It fits my personality that no matter what's going on I'm going to answer it honestly with a wink and a smile. As cliché as it might be, I feel like every situation needs a laugh." L. Michael Gipson of Creative Loafing notes David Bowie and Lenny Kravitz as references points for Hunt's songwriting, and writes that What Were You Hoping For? explores "both sides of the political aisles" with metaphorical songs such as "North Hollywood", "Designer Jeans", and the title track, as well as themes concerning an intimate relationship with the songs "Moving Targets", "Falls (Violet)", and "Cross Dresser".

All of these elements are coming together to create this combustion. My experience of trying to live here and survive myself is really where this record was born.

— Van Hunt, on living in Los Angeles

Certain songs were inspired by the effects of the late-2000s recession and Hunt's experience in North Hollywood, a district marked by population density, low income, and other recession-related issues. Hunt said of the district, "There's so many issues resulting from the recession. People are poor and struggling." He cited North Hollywood's "blue-collar aesthetic" as an inspiration for the songwriting: "It's kind of stepchild, not just to Hollywood but Studio City and Sherman Oaks. North Hollywood isn't particularly small, but it doesn't carry the same weight as the other places around it." Greg Kot calls Hunt's compositions "frisky and playful", and writes that most of the album's lyrical setting is North Hollywood "in decline, populated with hustlers, two-timers ... Money is tight and girlfriends are fickle. Todd Martens of the Los Angeles Times comments that much of the album "deals with economic difficulties and its effect on self-identity and love", and writes of its North Hollywood theme, "Songs about or set in Los Angeles aren't a rarity. Yet amid the glamour, the noir and the inner-city grit lies plenty of unexplored territory. Van Hunt spends a significant portion of [the album] traversing it." Of Hunt's perspective on the album, Martens writes that "[his] idea of beauty may be somewhat twisted ... informed by artistic roadblocks and career rejection".

The opening track "North Hollywood" is an affectionate ode to Hunt's community at the time. Its lyrics portray the district as the "crown jewel of saboteurs" and reference its population of misfits and low-lifes, including evicting landlords and conniving starlets. The song features abrasive funk, distorted guitar, and a heavy beat. "Watching You Go Crazy Is Driving Me Insane" features a melodic punk and garage rock style, with dark humor in its lyrics. It is about a couple whose financial difficulties affect their relationship. "Designer Jeans" features lyrics with psychedelic musings on the contemporary social climate, including criticism of "mass production and consumption of opinions" and the erasure of independent thought. "Plum" is an ode to a lover's posterior. "Falls (Violet)" is a ballad with a sketchy country music feel. Its narrator expresses support to a woman he is infatuated with as she dates someone else. "Moving Targets" is a bedroom ballad with sparse, 1980s-styled percussion and an Isley Brothers influence. Its lyrics use warfare imagery in detailing a romance. "Eyes Like Pearls" features hard rock guitar and earnest, romantic lyrics, which Hunt explained to The Huffington Post: "It's a very passionate love, one that's rarely known in one's life. They're obviously tears of joy, but it's a passion beyond anything I've ever known. It's a relationship where somebody understands me and who I understand."

"Moving Targets"
The ballad features sparse percussion and lyrics concerning an intimate relationship. Its strings and piano parts are by Hunt.

"What Were You Hoping For?"
The title track is a response to the effects of the global recession. It was recorded solely by Hunt, who played guitar and drums.

"A Time Machine Is My New Girlfriend" is a frenetic rocker with a Bo Diddley rhythm, and lyrics cautioning listeners that relationships can come with "late fees". Hunt explained its lyrics to be a metaphor for his lover making him feel younger. The title track features metronomic drumming and chicken scratch riffs. It is about people from different economic classes falling in love after social and economic conditions moved them into the same neighborhood. The setting is described in the first verse, "It's the end of white flight / even tycoons are licking their wounds / economic blight got the neighborhood looking gap-toothed / end of white flight / maybe now you see something you like / money tight and you're hating your life". Hunt said that writing the song was "essentially a response to some of the things I have seen as a result of the global recession we are going through. I wasn't trying to make any political statement. I was more making a philosophical comment that essentially says we have all these unspoken issues in our society. But I see a collision of those ideas and unresolved issues. My question is what could you have been hoping for when we make the kind of decisions in our society that we have made."

The Prince-inspired "Cross Dresser" has a new wave style and whimsical lyrics in which the narrator holds on to the memory of his lost love by wearing her clothes. Hunt said that he did not intend for the song to have a meaning other than the explicit: "I just thought it was funny. It's one of those things that people talk about, but that's never really happened to me. But I literally wrote it in 20 minutes. It felt good ... It was really quick and I just thought it was something silly and funny." "It's a Mysterious Hustle" features somber strings, a languid rhythm, an eerie piano vamp, and bitter singing by Hunt. It was recorded solely by Hunt, who played guitar, keyboards, and electronic drums. Its lyrics are about having to "work your way through the crowd" and "overcome the place you come from", and view the world as "no place to raise a child". Its spoken word conclusion preaches, "If you follow the beaten path, it will keep you tied to the past."

== Release and promotion ==
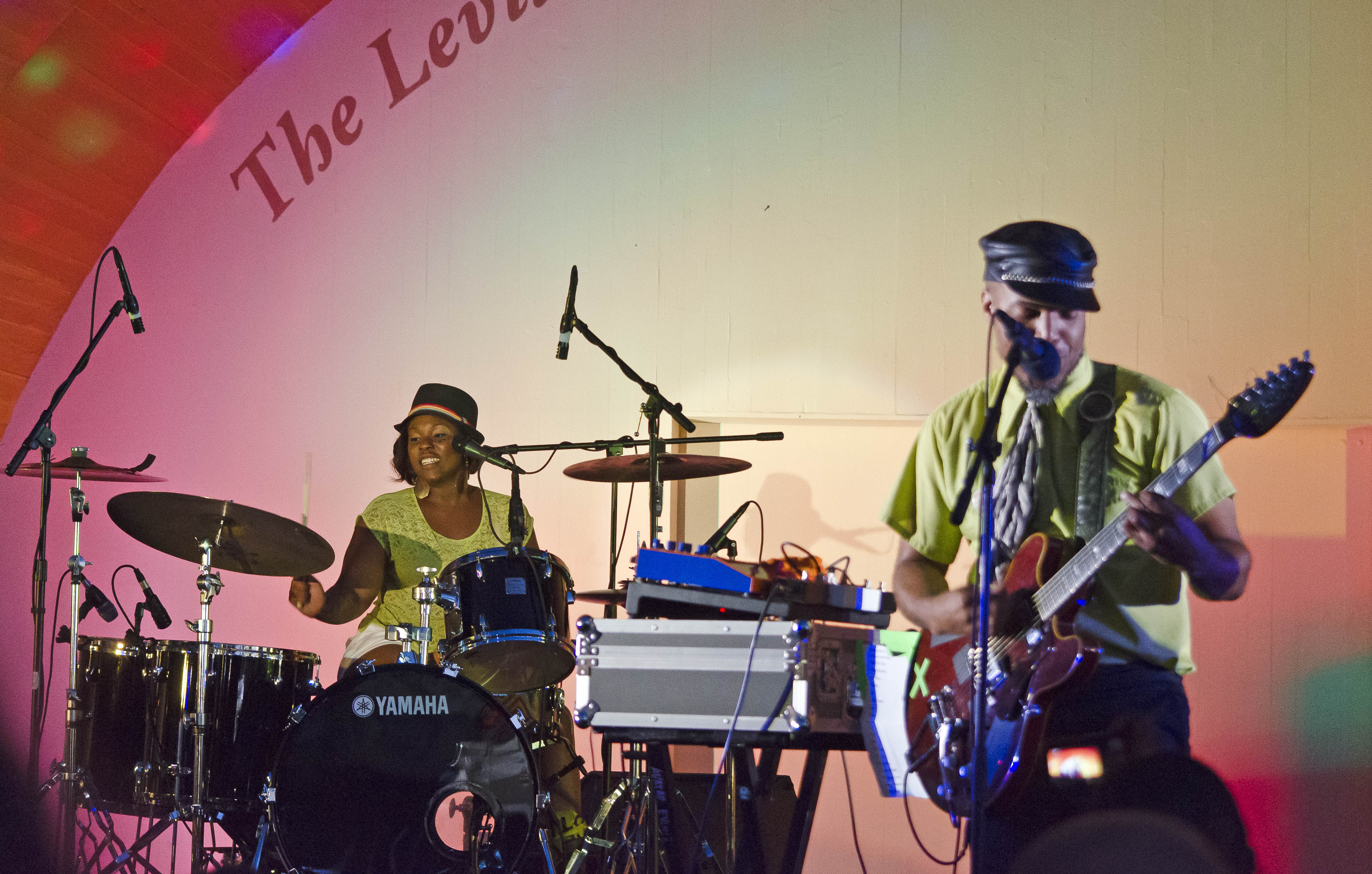
Hunt and Ruth Price (left) in concert, July 2012

What Were You Hoping For? was released on September 27, 2011, by Hunt's independent record label Godless Hotspot in a joint venture with Nashville-based distributor Thirty Tigers. It was distributed by RED Distribution. Thirty Tigers reached out to Hunt during 2009 and offered their distribution and marketing services to him pending the album's completion. He subsequently assembled a marketing team and Godless Hotspot. What Were You Hoping For? was executive-produced by music manager and executive Randy Jackson, who originally helped Hunt get his first major-label record contract in 2003. The album's cover is a photograph taken by Hunt in North Hollywood that depicts an elderly woman looking askance at a collection of white garbage bags set against a concrete wall. The interior packaging of the album also features Hunt's photography, including a kaleidoscopic collage of photographed subjects in the fold-out CD booklet.

In each of the months leading up to its release, Hunt promoted the album by releasing new songs as free downloads. They were made available through music websites, blogs, and his own website. The song "June" was released through The Huffington Post on June 15. Excluded from the album, it is a somber, jazz-styled track that contrasts the album's raw aesthetic, with upright bass and blue chord changes. Hunt explained the song to be "about a somber girl. I'm identifying with her somberness, but trying to make her smile ... [T]he June bloom has set in her and she's struggling with it." On July 7, Hunt released another non-album track, "The Savage, Sincere L of P", on Paste's website. It features a soulful rock style and lyrics about the pleasures of the flesh and "the savage, sincere look of pleasure". The album's lead single, "Eyes Like Pearls", was released on September 9 via Hunt's Facebook page.

Hunt also promoted the album with a 20-date national headlining tour, his first national tour since 2008. It began on September 19 at Webster Hall in New York City and concluded on October 13 at Yoshi's in San Francisco. He performed with members of his session band, drummer Ruth Price and keyboardist Peter Dyer, as well as guitarist Douglas Showalter. Prior to the tour, they had played at the 21st NAACP Theatre Awards gala on August 29.

== Reception ==
Professional ratings
Review scores
Source	Rating
AllMusic	4.5/5 stars
The A.V. Club	A−
Chicago Tribune	3.5/4 stars
Creative Loafing	4/5 stars
Magnet	8/10
NY Daily News	4/5 stars
Paste	8.1/10
Tom Hull – on the Web	B+
WBEZ	3.5/4 stars

What You Were Hoping For? was met with rave reviews from critics. At Metacritic, which assigns a normalized rating out of 100 to reviews from professional publications, the album received an average score of 90, based on six reviews. AllMusic's Andy Kellman called it "a rare lean, focused album where the in-the-red moments are just as effective as the twilight ballads", while Jason Heller of The A.V. Club said the record was "twice as raw and thrice as hungry as anything the neo-soul mastermind has previously released ... a full-throated, full-throttle challenge". Writing for WBEZ, Jim DeRogatis called it "as joyful, free-ranging, and wildly inventive a psychedelic-soul classic as any you can name", writing that Hunt's compositions make "even the wildest, most genre-defying flights of fancy ... instantly accessible and equally stimulating to brain and booty." Chicago Tribune critic Greg Kot dubbed it Hunt's "most adventurous album yet" because he "stretches the parameters of R&B with a refreshing lack of self-consciousness ... His craftsmanship never devolves into shtick." Kot later named it the fourth-best album of 2011 and wrote that although it is musically varied, "the glue is Hunt's acuity as a songwriter; he knows how to drop hooks and turn a smart phrase, and this album brims with surprises."

Some reviewers were more reserved in their praise. Michael Tedder from Paste felt that Hunt "sometimes comes off a bit like he's exploring the idea of a genre more than actually writing a song", while citing drummer Ruth Price as the record's "the secret weapon". Jon Caramanica of The New York Times called it "a messy album, sometimes thrillingly so, a mélange of psychedelic rock, punk energy and R&B desperation", and Tom Hull said Hunt "tries to regroup here with jerky rhythms, odd time signatures, and odder lyrics, which do add something."

Despite the critical acclaim, the album received some backlash from Hunt's fanbase and listeners for departing from the style of his previous records. He addressed the criticism in an interview for the Milwaukee Journal Sentinel:

Other recording artists will supply their fans with an album full of songs they will enjoy for 15 or 20 years. I'm a man that grows, progresses and matures, I want to grow [musically] with the people who want to go with me on that journey ... An artist should put out work that the culture should inspire to as opposed to trying to meet the culture, that's backwards to me. I don't just sit down and worry about what people will like, my job is to express myself as honest as I possibly can.

Commercially, What You Were Hoping For? peaked at number 19 on the Billboard Top Heatseekers Albums – a weekly music chart that ranks top-selling albums by new or developing acts, defined as those who have never appeared in the top 100 of the Billboard 200 or in the top 10 of Billboard's component charts. The album also reached number 50 on the Top R&B/Hip-Hop Albums chart.

== Track listing ==
All songs were written, arranged, and produced by Van Hunt.

No.	Title	Length
1.	"North Hollywood"	3:27
2.	"Watching You Go Crazy Is Driving Me Insane"	3:17
3.	"Designer Jeans"	4:21
4.	"Plum"	6:26
5.	"Falls (Violet)"	3:39
6.	"Moving Targets"	3:51
7.	"Eyes Like Pearls"	3:20
8.	"A Time Machine Is My New Girlfriend"	4:34
9.	"What Were You Hoping For?"	3:46
10.	"Cross Dresser"	2:57
11.	"It's a Mysterious Hustle"	4:16

== Personnel ==
Credits for What Were You Hoping For? adapted from Allmusic.

- Awful Gazelle – photography
- Jim DeMain – mastering
- Peter Dyer – Fender Rhodes, keyboards, synthesizer
- Kevin Guarnieri – guitar engineer, vocal engineer
- Van Hunt – arranger, composer, drums, guitar, keyboards, piano, producer, strings, synthesizer
- Jose Izabal – engineer
- Randy Jackson – executive producer
- Madly – recitation, vocals
- J. P. Maramba – upright bass
- Melissa Mattey – mixing, percussion, vocal engineer, vocals
- Alistair Philip – recitation
- Ruth Price – drums
- A. Prince – design

== Charts ==
Chart (2011)	Peak position
U.S. Billboard Top Heatseekers	19
U.S. Top R&B/Hip-Hop Albums	50

== See also ==
- Pull Up Some Dust and Sit Down
