= Championship Manager 2006 =

2006 video game

- PC version cover art
- Developers: Beautiful Game Studios, Gusto Games
- Publisher: Eidos Interactive
- Series: Championship Manager
- Platforms: Microsoft Windows, Xbox, PlayStation 2, PlayStation Portable
- Release: Windows: EU: 31 March 2006; PlayStation Portable: EU: 7 April 2006; AU: 9 July 2009; PlayStation 2: EU: 5 May 2006; Xbox: EU: 12 May 2006
- Genre: Sports management
- Mode: Single player

Championship Manager 2006 is a football management simulation video game in Eidos Interactive's Championship Manager series. It is essentially a seasonal update for Championship Manager 5. The game was developed by Beautiful Game Studios and was released on PC Windows on 31 March 2006.

== Key features ==
Possibly the most anticipated new feature for Championship Manager 2006 was the updated "Gameplan" 3D match engine, which the developers and publisher had described as a "3D representation of a football match". Although it is not the FIFA or Pro Evolution Soccer-style 3D match engine that some fans wanted, it is another step along from the top-down 2D view. The developers improved on Championship Manager 5's single isometric view by promising eleven different camera angles to view the match from.

Player interaction was improved greatly, offering 32 different types of interaction, such as player fines, homesickness, and relationships with other players in the team. The game also included a more accurate and fully up-to-date database of players and clubs. It did not feature any additional playable leagues to the 26 found Championship Manager 5, which was a disappointment for some fans; the developers argued that this would help them to improve the quality of data found in the existing playable leagues.

== Other versions ==
A handheld version of the game has been released for Sony's PlayStation Portable on 7 April 2006. A console version developed by Gusto Games was released on Xbox and PlayStation 2 in May 2006. A mobile version of the game, titled Championship Manager 2006 Mobile, was developed by Dynamo Games, a BAFTA award-winning developer.

== International update ==
On 2 June 2006, to tie in with the 2006 FIFA World Cup, an update pack was released on the Championship Manager website for the PC. This pack fixed minor problems with the original release of the game, and also included the International Management Mode. The mode allows players to take control of international teams, and take them through their international competitions such as the FIFA World Cup.

== Glitches ==
Before the International Update, there were many glitches and problems in the game. A few players playing for Forest Green Rovers F.C. had extremely high attributes but were still worth only about £40,000. The most famous players were Alex Meechan and Bruno Teixeira. There was also another glitch that let the player buy players without paying wages. There are several South American players whose value is far less than the statistics of the player when first bought. On the Xbox version, there are fake players on Manchester United F.C., Chelsea F.C., and Plymouth Argyle F.C.

Some players, such as Cesar Daniel Caceres Canete and Danilo Belic, were the wrong age in the game. Canete started the game as an eight-year-old and Belic 14, meaning that they keep improving for several years. Some player histories failed to show transfers and instead shows the player's whole career at the one club. A final glitch let the player change the transfer status and value of footballers out on loan, meaning that if the player can loan a footballer, they can later sign them for free and often on a lower contract.

== See also ==
- Football Manager 2006
