= Football Manager 2006 =

2005 video game

- Developer(s): Sports Interactive
- Publisher(s): Sega
- Series: Football Manager
- Platform(s): Microsoft Windows, Mac OS X, PlayStation Portable, Xbox 360
- Release: Microsoft Windows, Mac OS X, PlayStation Portable: EU: 21 October 2005; Xbox 360: EU: 13 April 2006
- Genre(s): Sports management
- Mode(s): Single player, multiplayer over TCP/IP or hot-seat

Football Manager 2006, also known as Worldwide Soccer Manager 2006 in North America, is a football management simulation video game and the second instalment in the Football Manager series developed by Sports Interactive and published by Sega. It is available for Microsoft Windows, Mac OS X, and PlayStation Portable platforms and was released in the United Kingdom on 21 October 2005. It was also the first game in the series to be released on an Xbox console, as an Xbox 360 version was released in April 2006. It was succeeded by Football Manager 2007. On the same day as the release of Football Manager 2006, Sports Interactive released a patch to fix some bugs discovered during the Beta and Gold stages of development. In its first week of release, it became the second-fastest-selling PC game of all-time in the United Kingdom.

== Gameplay ==
Football Manager 2006 features similar gameplay to that of Football Manager 2005. Gameplay consists of taking charge of a professional football team (the game also includes semi-professional, amateur, and international teams) as the manager. Players can sign football players to contracts, manage finances for the club, and give team talks to players. The Football Manager series is a simulation of real world management, with the player being judged on various factors by the club's AI owners and board. Football Manager 2006 adjusts some gameplay that was found in the original football manager release. These adjustments include team-talks, simplified training and in-game help screens. As has been customary with the series a beta demo of the game was released on 12 September 2005. This was later followed on 30 September by a gold demo. This is a cut-down, limited time version of the full game which is sent to the game manufacturers.

== Licences ==
Football Manager 2006 contains the same playable leagues as its predecessor but with two small additions. The French league now has a fourth viewable but unplayable level (the CFA division), and the structural change to the Swedish league involving the re-instatement of Division One has been implemented, with Division Two retained as a playable fourth level. Fictional team Harchester United F.C. from the Sky One drama series Dream Team was included in Football Manager 2006 as an Easter egg. This option comes in the form of a text file, which is placed in the game's directory.

== Reception ==
Reception

Aggregate scores
Aggregator	Score
GameRankings	PC: 89% PSP: 77% X360: 78%
Metacritic	PC: 89/100

Football Manager 2006 received favourable reviews from critics. Both GameRankings and Metacritic aggregators rate it at 89 out of 100. In his review for Eurogamer, Kristan Reed wrote: "It's a 9/10 game before you've even got it out of the shrink-wrapping, and whether you've given it a cursory 10, 20 or more hours, it's just tough – nigh on impossible in fact – to decide its true merits on the basis of a 'review's length' of time. Whether it deserves the elusive 10 out of 10 that the game ought to be getting is a subject that few can answer from the 'first impressions' of a debut season."

In Trusted Reviews, Gordon Kelly wrote: "As expected, Football Manager 2006 takes the series to the next level. It expands every area, pushes every boundary and never before has such an enviable career felt so real. Sports Interactive probably never dreamed it would come so far from the very first Championship Manager title all those years ago. It has picked up millions of fans since then, but it has also lost the casual gamer along the way."

== Sales and accolades ==
Football Manager 2006's computer version received a "Platinum" sales award from the Entertainment and Leisure Software Publishers Association (ELSPA), indicating sales of at least 300,000 copies in the United Kingdom. It was also a runner-up for Computer Games Magazine's list of the top 10 computer games of 2005.

== See also ==
- Business simulation game
- Championship Manager 2006
