= Street Faërie =

Studio album by Cree Summer
- Released: April 20, 1999
- Genres: Alternative rock; pop; soul; folk
- Length: 59:10
- Labels: WORK; Columbia (EU) OK 68749 (North America) 491131 (international)
- Producer: Lenny Kravitz

Professional ratings
Review scores
| Source | Rating |
|---|---|
| AllMusic | 3/5 stars |
| Entertainment Weekly | B− |
| Rolling Stone | 3.5/5 stars |

Street Faërie is the only solo studio album by Canadian-American singer and actress Cree Summer. It was released on April 20, 1999, by the WORK Group. The album was entirely produced by American musician Lenny Kravitz.

== Music ==
The lyrics feature themes of racism, romantic liaisons, and spirituality into the lyrics of guitar-heavy pop and folk songs.

"Miss Moon" is an ode to having sex while a woman is menstruating. "Fall," a fully orchestral jazz ballad, reads like the breakup of a relationship but is in fact the literal interpretation of the wilting and decay of a leaf: "Black stemmed, orange trimmed/with the slighest wind I'm fallen from you."

"Naheo" is a tribute to Summer's Native American roots, while "Curious White Boy" is a Black woman's response to her white lover after she realizes he has become involved with her out of some sense of racial guilt: "Another housekeeper fantasy?/Coffee-colored remedy for your hangover from history", and "Mean Sleep" is an uncredited duet with producer Lenny Kravitz.

== Track listing ==
- All tracks co-written by C.S. Francks. Additional writers are noted depending on track.

Standard edition

| No. | Title | Length |
|---|---|---|
| 1. | "Revelation Sunshine" (Greg Bell) | 4:55 |
| 2. | "Miss Moon" (Lenny Kravitz) | 4:30 |
| 3. | "Still Heart" (Kravitz, Torrel Ruffin) | 2:51 |
| 4. | "Deliciously Down" (Van Hunt) | 4:50 |
| 5. | "Mean Sleep" (Hunt) | 4:35 |
| 6. | "Life Goes On" (Bell) | 3:29 |
| 7. | "Fall" (Ruffin) | 5:53 |
| 8. | "Angry Boy" (Ruffin) | 4:56 |
| 9. | "Sweet Pain" (Hunt) | 4:20 |
| 10. | "Smooth My Heart" (David Ryan Harris) | 5:28 |
| 11. | "Naheo" (Ruffin) | 4:06 |
| 12. | "Soul Sister" (Bell) | 4:15 |
| 13. | "Curious White Boy" (Ruffin) | 4:54 |
| Total length: | | 59:10 |

Japanese bonus track

| No. | Title | Length |
|---|---|---|
| 14. | "Revelation Club Shine" (Bell) |

== Personnel ==
- Kimberly Evans - background vocals
- Lenny Kravitz - bass, guitar, percussion, arranger, drums, harpsichord, organ, programming, tambourine, vocals, background vocals, clavinet, producer, mellotron, cowbell, horn arrangements, mixing, finger cymbals, drum loop, cabasa
- Terry Manning - engineer, mixing
- Matt Knobel - Drum programming, digital engineering
- Craig Ross - acoustic guitar, mandolin, electric guitar
- Cree Summer - vocals, background vocals
- Harold Todd - flute, saxophone
- CeCe White - background vocals
