= Cree Summer =

Canadian-American actress and singer (born 1969)

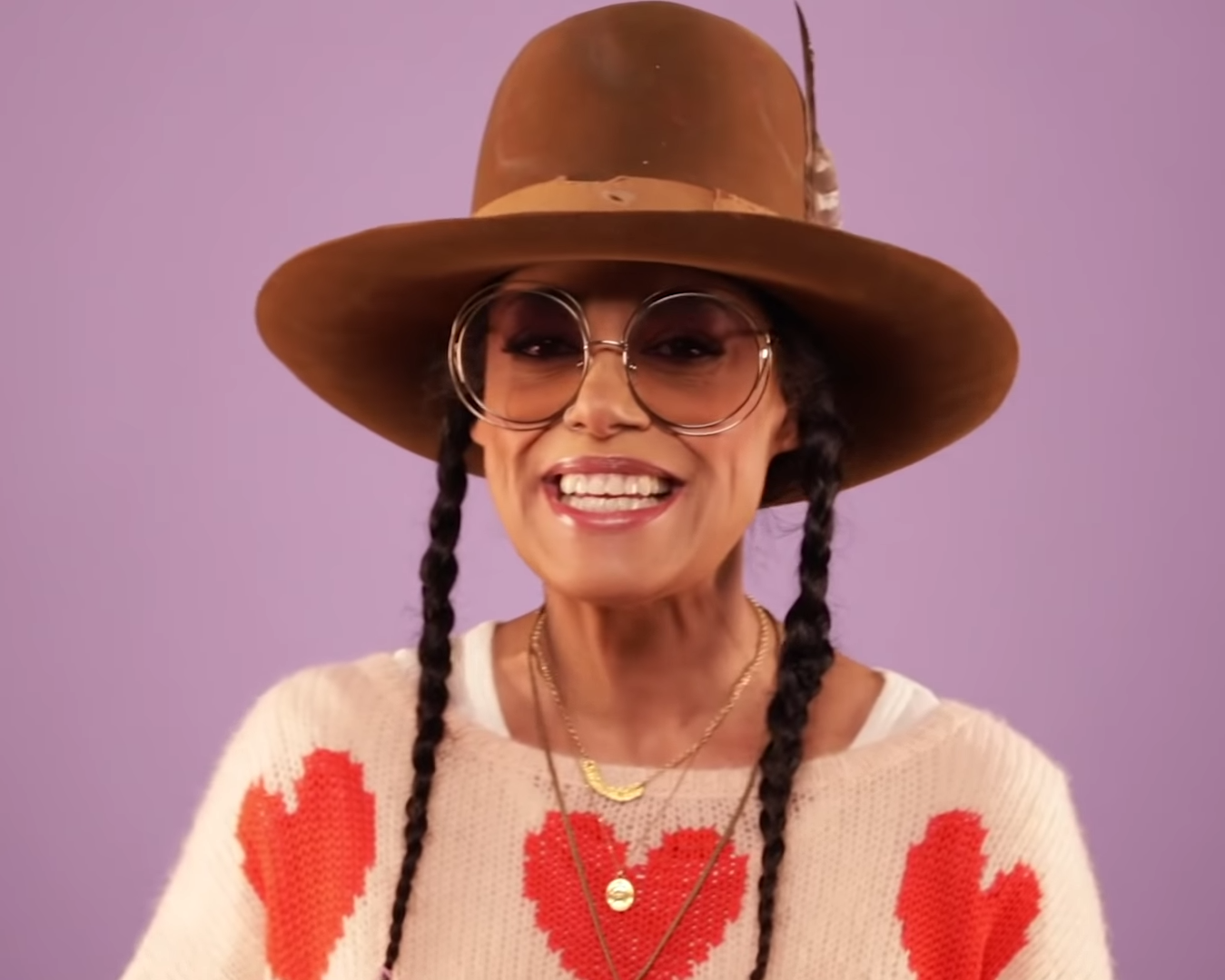
- Summer in 2020
- Born: Cree Summer Francks; July 7, 1969 (age 57); Los Angeles, California, U.S.
- Citizenship: United States; Canada
- Occupations: Actress; singer
- Years active: 1983–present
- Spouse: Angelo Pullen (m. 2013; div. 2022)
- Children: 2
- Father: Don Francks
- Relatives: Rainbow Sun Francks (brother)
- Musical career
- Genres: Soul; pop; R&B; alt-rock
- Instrument: Vocals
- Label: Work
- Formerly of: Subject to Change

Cree Summer Francks (born July 7, 1969) is a Canadian-American actress and singer. In animation, she has voiced characters such as Penny in the first season of Inspector Gadget, Elmyra Duff in Tiny Toon Adventures and related media, Susie Carmichael in Rugrats and Lizard in Spirit Rangers. The latter two respectively won her an NAACP Image Award and two nominations at the Children's and Family Emmy Awards.

Summer is also known for her roles in Batman Beyond, Horrible Histories, Clifford the Big Red Dog, Codename: Kids Next Door, Atlantis: The Lost Empire, Danny Phantom, My Life as a Teenage Robot, Transformers: Animated, Drawn Together, Gargoyles, W.I.T.C.H., and Puppy Dog Pals. In live-action, she is known for playing Winifred "Freddie" Brooks in the NBC sitcom A Different World (1987–1993) and librarian Rosalyn Inez in the ABC sitcom Abbott Elementary since 2024.

== Early life ==
Summer was born in Los Angeles, California on July 7, 1969, and grew up in Saskatchewan and Toronto, Ontario, Canada. Her parents are Canadian actors Don Francks and Lili "Red Eagle" Francks (née Clark). She and her family travelled and lived around British Columbia during her childhood, and she started public school at the age of nine in Toronto. Her brother, Rainbow Sun Francks, is an actor and a former MuchMusic VJ.

== Career ==
=== Acting ===
Summer's acting career began in 1982, when she appeared on the Canadian children's program Mr. Dressup. The following year, she was cast as Penny in the first season of the original version of Inspector Gadget. She appeared frequently in animated programs, including The Care Bears Movie (1985) and Ewoks (1985, part of the Star Wars franchise).

In 1988, Summer was cast as the free-spirited Winifred "Freddie" Brooks in The Cosby Show spin-off A Different World. She remained a regular cast member of the show from 1988 through its end in 1993.

During the run of A Different World, Summer continued working in voice acting. She was cast in the short-lived television series Sweet Justice in 1994 until its cancellation in 1995. In the fall of that same year, Summer and her A Different World co-star Jenifer Lewis starred in the prime time drama Courthouse, which was cancelled two months after it premiered. Apart from guest appearances on other live-action television shows such as Living Single, Better Things, and The Fresh Prince of Bel-Air, Summer's professional work since has mostly been limited to voice acting.

At the start of the third season of A Different World in 1988, the cartoon series The Real Ghostbusters episodes were expanded from their original half-hour format to an hour. The show was changed to be more youthful. Episodes had a lighter tone designed to be less serious and frightening. In these lighter episodes, she voiced Chilly Cooper, the neighborhood ice-cream woman and innocent love interest of Slimer.

She appeared as herself in "It Was All a Dream", the final episode of Atlanta, in 2022, following a voice cameo in the first-season episode "B.A.N.".

Summer has a recurring guest role as librarian Rosalyn Inez on the ABC sitcom Abbott Elementary.

=== Voice acting ===
Summer voiced more than 101 animated characters between 1983 and 2006, spanning video games, cartoon television series, animated films, and commercials. Among her most famous roles was in Inspector Gadget (Season 1) as Penny (a role she reprised in the Robot Chicken episode "Adoption's an Option"), WB's Tiny Toon Adventures (1990) as Elmyra Duff (which she reprised for Pinky, Elmyra & the Brain) and Mary Melody, Aka Pella in WB's Histeria!, Susie Carmichael in Nickelodeon's Rugrats and its spin-off All Grown Up!, Cleo the Poodle in PBS Kids' Clifford the Big Red Dog, Mo in the US Dub of Horrible Histories, Miranda from Nickelodeon's As Told by Ginger, Foxxy Love in Drawn Together, Dulcy the Dragon in Sonic the Hedgehog, Valerie Gray in Nickelodeon's Danny Phantom, Numbuh 5 and Cree Lincoln in Cartoon Network's Codename: Kids Next Door, Penelope in Barbie as Rapunzel, octogenarian villain Granny May on WordGirl, Tiff Crust from Nickelodeon's My Life as a Teenage Robot, and Blackarachnia in Transformers: Animated. She also voiced Princess 'Kida' Kidagakash for the franchise of Disney's Atlantis: The Lost Empire. Summer has regarded the character of Kida as one of her favorite roles and even considers the character among the official Disney Princess line. She also played a role in Scooby-Doo! Mystery Incorporated as Lady Marmalade in the episode "The Haunting". In December 2016, Summer reprised her role as Penny from Inspector Gadget in an episode of the web-series, Nostalgia Critic. She later joined SpongeBob SquarePants spinoff The Patrick Star Show, where she voices Patrick Star's mother and Squidward Tentacles' grandmother.

==== Video game voice acting ====
She performed voice over for the games Baldur's Gate: Dark Alliance, Black, as well as Tony Hawk's American Wasteland. She voiced Auriel in Diablo III, and reprised the role for Heroes of the Storm. She was the voice of Tandi in Fallout and First Citizen Lynette in Fallout 2, Tatjana in Arc the Lad: Twilight of the Spirits, Lady Belgemine, Young Tidus and additional voice-overs in Final Fantasy X, Lenne/Calli in Final Fantasy X-2, Storm in Marvel Super Hero Squad, Cynder in The Legend of Spyro: A New Beginning, Magma in X-Men Legends, and the Inca Princess Micay in Pitfall: The Lost Expedition. She voices Medusa in the game Kid Icarus: Uprising for the Nintendo 3DS. She voiced Catalina Thorn, the leader of the Cell in Crackdown 2. She had a small role in Mass Effect. She did miscellaneous voices in World of Warcraft: Mists of Pandaria. She reprised her voice of She-Hulk in Marvel Super Hero Squad: The Infinity Gauntlet. She voiced Kit Brinny in the introduction video for the MMORPG Wildstar. She provides the voice of vampire Roller Brawl in the Skylanders series. She has voiced Professor Penelope Young, a minor character original in Batman: Arkham Asylum.

=== Music ===
Summer recorded the theme song for OWL/TV in 1985. In 1990, she sang background vocals on two tracks for fellow A Different World cast member Jasmine Guy, appearing on the album Jasmine Guy. In 1993, she released the album Womb Amnesia on Capitol Records with her band Subject to Change. In 1999, Summer released a solo album, Street Faërie, produced by and featuring Lenny Kravitz.

A number of Summer's portrayed characters (animated or otherwise) are singers. The character of Susie in All Grown Up! was portrayed as a singer with real talent, allowing Summer to sing in the role. Summer sings the opening theme song for All Grown Up!. The character of Foxxy Love in Drawn Together was a singer, with songs like "La-La-La-La-Labia" and "Crashy Smashy", Numbuh 5 from Codename: Kids Next Door sang a lullaby to lull babies to sleep. Elmyra Duff sang many times on Tiny Toon Adventures. She co-performed lead vocals in the song "Cool Kitty" with Tara Strong, which accompanied a cartoon called Class of 3000, directed and written for Cartoon Network by André 3000. She provided the voice of a recurring pomegranate singer in The High Fructose Adventures of Annoying Orange, who usually sang during montage sequences. Her character Priscilla on Sheriff Callie's Wild West sings many times, as well.

In 2008, Summer appeared on The Frank Zappa AAAFNRAAA Birthday Bundle, performing a cover of Frank Zappa's song "Dirty Love" with Dweezil Zappa on guitar and backup vocals by Ahmet Zappa, produced by Linda Perry.

Summer's musical influences include Frank Zappa, Al Green, and Dinah Washington.

== Personal life ==
Summer has dual American and Canadian citizenship. She was married to producer Angelo Pullen for nearly ten years; they announced the dissolution of their marriage in May 2022. They have two daughters, who were born in 2011 and 2013.

== Filmography ==
=== Animated film roles ===
List of voice performances in films
Year	Title	Role	Notes	Source
1984	Strawberry Shortcake and the Baby Without a Name	Orange Blossom	Television film	
1985	The Care Bears Movie	Young Kim	Feature film	
1986	Care Bears Movie II: A New Generation	Christy	Feature film	
1986	Madballs: Escape from Orb	Freakella	Direct-to-video	
1992	Tiny Toon Adventures: How I Spent My Vacation	Elmyra Duff, Mary Melody	Direct-to-video	
1998	The Rugrats Movie	Susie Carmichael	Feature film	
2000	An Extremely Goofy Movie	Co-Ed (girl at club)	Direct-to-video	
2000	Rugrats in Paris: The Movie	Susie Carmichael	Feature film	
2000	As Told by Ginger	Miranda Killgallen	Direct-to-video	
2001	Atlantis: The Lost Empire	Princess Kida	Feature film	
2001	All Growed Up	Susie Carmichael	Television film	
2002	The Wild Thornberrys Movie	Phaedra	Feature film	
2002	Barbie as Rapunzel	Penelope	Direct-to-video	
2003	Atlantis: Milo's Return	Queen Kida	Direct-to-video	
2003	Rugrats Go Wild	Susie Carmichael	Feature film	
2003	Blizzard	Aphrodite	Feature film	
2004	Clifford's Really Big Movie	Cleo, Mrs. Diller	Feature film	
2005	The Land Before Time XI: Invasion of the Tinysauruses	Lizzie, Bonehead	Direct-to-video	
2005	Bratz	Alonce	Direct-to-video	
2006	Bambi II	Mena	Feature film (non-USA)	
2006	Bratz: Genie Magic	Zell	Direct-to-video	
2006	Operation: Z.E.R.O	Numbuh 5, Cree Lincoln, Delightful Children From Down The Lane	Television film	
2006	Bratz: Passion 4 Fashion Diamondz	Mandy	Direct-to-video	
2007	Hellboy: Blood and Iron	Hecate	Direct-to-video	
2007	Superman: Doomsday	Mercy Graves	Direct-to-video	
2008	Turok: Son of Stone	Sepinta	Direct-to-video	
2009	Curious George 2: Follow That Monkey!	Mrs. Fisher, Cargo Pilot, Young Girl	Feature film	
2010	The Drawn Together Movie: The Movie	Foxxy Love, Suck My Taint Girl, Network Head's Wife, Old Lady	Feature film	
2011	DC Showcase: Catwoman	Lily	Feature film	
2012	Medusa's Revenge	Medusa	Feature film	
2012	Strange Frame: Love & Sax	Reesa Abi Kiran Ariana Livingston III	Feature film	
2013	Curious George: A Halloween Boo Fest	Ada	Television film	
2014	Stan Lee's Mighty 7: Beginnings	Veronica	Television film	
2015	Madea's Tough Love	Woman in Crowd	Direct-to-video	
2015	The SpongeBob Movie: Sponge Out of Water	Seagull	Feature film	
2015	Lego DC Comics Super Heroes: Justice League – Attack of the Legion of Doom	Cheetah	Direct-to-video	
2016	Nerdland	Reporter Sassy	Direct-to-video	
2019	Toy Story 4	Additional voices	Feature film	
2019	Wonder Woman: Bloodlines	Hippolyta	Direct-to-video	
2022	Teen Titans Go! & DC Super Hero Girls: Mayhem in the Multiverse	Catwoman, Hippolyta	Direct-to-video	
2023	The Super Mario Bros. Movie	additional voices	Feature film	

=== Animated television roles ===
List of voice performances in animated television
Year	Series	Role	Notes	Source
1983	Inspector Gadget	Penny	65 episodes, Gadget's Greatest Gadgets	
1985–86	Star Wars: Droids & Ewoks	Princess Gerin (Droids), Princess Kneesaa, Jari Kintaka (Ewoks, Season one only)		
1986	The Care Bears Family	Gay	Episode: "The Big Star Round-Up"	
1987	Hello Kitty's Furry Tale Theater	Catnip		
1988	Garbage Pail Kids	Clogged Duane, Heartless Hal, Trashed Tracy, Squishy, Plain Jane		
1988	The New Yogi Bear Show	Scruffy, additional voices	Episode: "Pokey the Bear"	
1990	Kid 'n Play	Marika, Downtown		
1990	Peter Pan and the Pirates	Tiger Lily	3 episodes	
1990	Camp Candy	Robin	6 episodes	
1990–92	Tiny Toon Adventures	Elmyra Duff, Mary Melody		
1991, 1994	Captain Planet and the Planeteers	Karen, Georgina Cabor	3 episodes	
1992	The Little Mermaid	Pearl	2 episodes	
1992	The Plucky Duck Show	Elmyra Duff		
1993	Cro	Soolie		
1993–2004	Rugrats	Susie Carmichael, Edwin Carmichael, Vendor	Nominated – NAACP Image Award for Outstanding Performance in a Youth or Children's Series/Special (2002)	
1994	Bonkers	Alto, Young Toon Saxophone	Episode: "Frame That Toon"	
1994	Sonic the Hedgehog	Dulcy the Dragon		
1994–95	Animaniacs	Elmyra Duff, Singers	3 episodes	
1994–96	Gargoyles	Hyena		
1995	Happily Ever After: Fairy Tales for Every Child	Princess Ebony	Episode: "The Frog Prince"	
1995	Freakazoid!	Jill	Episode: "Dance of Doom"	
1995	The Twisted Tales of Felix the Cat	Sheba Beboporeba		
1996	Project G.e.e.K.e.R.	Lady MacBeth		
1996	Mortal Kombat: Defenders of the Realm	Princess Kitana		
1996–97	The Mask: The Animated Series	Jennifer Peenman, Gorgonzola, Cookie BaBoom, Davida Steelmine		
1997	Adventures from the Book of Virtues	Bessie	Episode: "Faith"	
1997	The Wacky World of Tex Avery	Khannie	27 episodes	
1997	The New Batman Adventures	Ice Maiden #2	Episode: "Cold Comfort"	
1997	Superman: The Animated Series	Natasha Irons, Psychic Girl	2 episodes	
1997	Men in Black: The Series	Vonda		
1997	The Incredible Hulk	She-Hulk	Season 2	
1997	Mummies Alive!	Nefertina		
1997–98	Jungle Cubs	Louie	Season 2	
1997–98	101 Dalmatians: The Series	Princess		
1998	Oh Yeah! Cartoons	Polly, Tilly, Cleo		
1998	Pinky and the Brain	Bunny, Receptionist		
1998	Hercules	Anaxerete		
1998–2000	Histeria!	Aka Pella, Senator, Mrs. T-Rex		
1998–2000	Pepper Ann	Tessa James, Vanessa James		
1998–99	Pinky, Elmyra & the Brain	Elmyra Duff	13 episodes Nominated – Annie Award for Outstanding Individual Achievement for Voice Acting in an Animated Television Production (1999)	
1999	The Wild Thornberrys	Feral Girl, Panther, Rosie	2 episodes	
1999	Sabrina: The Animated Series	Chloe Flan		
1999–2001	Batman Beyond	Max Gibson, Tigress		
2000	Buzz Lightyear of Star Command	Savy SL2	Episode: "The Slayer"	
2000–03	Clifford the Big Red Dog	Cleo, Mrs. Diller, additional voices	Nominated – Daytime Emmy Award for Outstanding Performer in an Animated Program (2001)	
2000–04	As Told by Ginger	Miranda Killgallen		
2001	The Weekenders	Penny Descartes, Carver's Mom, Todd Descartes		
2001	The Zeta Project	Skye Hoaps	Episode: "Ro's Reunion"	
2001	Johnny Bravo	Amy Elephant, Salvador, Puppy	Episode: "A Johnny Bravo Christmas"	
2001	Horrible Histories	Mo, additional voices		
2002–06	My Life as a Teenage Robot	Tiff, Vicky, QT2, Stephanie, various voices		
2002	Totally Spies!	Model, Tuesday Tate	Episode: "Model Citizens"	
2002	Ozzy & Drix	Mayor Santorini	Episode: "An Out of Body Experience"	
2002	Kim Possible	Additional voices		
2002–08	Codename: Kids Next Door	Numbuh Five/Abigail "Abby" Lincoln, Delightful Children from Down the Lane, Numbuh Eleven/Cree Lincoln, additional voices		
2002–03	The Proud Family	Peabo, additional voices	3 episodes/more	
2003	Spider-Man: The New Animated Series	Professor Patricia Williams, Joana	3 episodes	
2003–08	All Grown Up!	Susie Carmichael	Nominated – NAACP Image Award for Outstanding Performance in a Youth/Children's Program (2004)	
2004	ChalkZone	Sonny	Episode: "Let's Twister Again/The Legend of the Golden Worms/Beanie Boys to Men"	
2004	Star Wars: Clone Wars	Luminara Unduli	Episode: "Chapter 14"	
2004	Static Shock	Candide	Episode: "Wet and Wild"	
2004	The Grim Adventures of Billy & Mandy	Cave Witch	Episode: "A Grim Prophecy"	
2004	Dave the Barbarian	Mona, Sheebor, arious voices		
2004	Justice League Unlimited	Female Singer, Watchtower Computer	Episode: "Fearful Symmetry"	
2004–07	Danny Phantom	Valerie Gray	2nd voice (since Episode 10 "Shades of Grey")	
2004–07	Drawn Together	Foxxy Love, various voices	36 episodes	
2005	Lilo & Stitch: The Series	Lana	Episode: "Retro: Experiment #210"	
2005	Bratz	Aloncé	Episode: "Sasha's Big Interview"	
2005	Danger Rangers	Alisha, Alisha's Mother		
2005	Ben 10	Frightwig	2 episodes	
2005	Four Eyes!	Miss Wendy Doager		
2005–06	The Buzz on Maggie	Rayna Cartflight		
2005–06	Rugrats Pre-School Daze	Susie Carmichael	4 episodes	
2005–08	My Gym Partner's a Monkey	Mrs. Eugenia Tusk, Kerry, Miss Loon, Latanya Hippo, Eddie Panther		
2006–21	Robot Chicken	Penny, Little Girl, Mother, Goldilocks, Valerie Brown	3 episodes	
2006	Bratz Genie Magic	Zell		
2006	W.I.T.C.H.	Ember	4 episodes	
2006	The Replacements	Nature Activist	Episode: "Zoo or False?"	
2006	Celebrity Deathmatch	Missy Elliott	Episode: "Shaq vs. Kobe"	
2007	Class of 3000	Kaylie, Tanya (singing voice)	Episode: "Prank Yankers"	
2007	The Land Before Time	Tippy	Episode: "The Forbidden Friendship"	
2007	Friday: The Animated Series	Betty "Mom" Jones, Dana Jones		
2007	Transformers: Animated	Blackarachnia, Elita-1		
2007	Karas	Yurine		
2007–11	Curious George	Ada, The Announcer, Sisley	3 episodes	
2007–15	WordGirl	Granny May		
2008	Betsy's Kindergarten Adventures	Sarah, Maria		
2008	The Marvelous Misadventures of Flapjack	Diver, Buff Delinquent	Episode: "Several Leagues Under the Sea/Eye Sea You"	
2008–09	The Spectacular Spider-Man	Glory Grant		
2009	DJ & the Fro	Doreen, Cecilia, Gigi, Skillet	Episode: "101"	
2009	The Goode Family	Souki		
2009–11	The Super Hero Squad Show	Storm	3 episodes	
2010	Batman: The Brave and the Bold	Vixen	2 episodes	
2011	Scooby-Doo! Mystery Incorporated	Lady Marmalade, Paige Kruller	2 episodes	
2011	The Cleveland Show	Twin #1, Guest #1	Episode: "Sex and the Biddy"	
2011	Good Vibes	HJ Kuntz, BJ Kuntz, Tang, Wanda		
2011–13	Pound Puppies	Cupcake, Izzy, Sumalee, additional voices		
2011–12	Young Justice	Madame Xanadu, Mary West, Tula/Aquagirl, Mattie Harcourt, Highway Patrolman	3 episodes	
2011–12	ThunderCats	Panthera	2 episodes	
2011–12	Dan Vs.	Becky, Kelly	2 episodes	
2012–13	Robot and Monster	Spitfire, Globetha		
2012	Superman of Tokyo	Jemmy		
2013	Henry Hugglemonster	Denzel Dugglemonster		
2013	The High Fructose Adventures of Annoying Orange	Honey Doo-Doo, Pomegranate, Mr. Cash and Smash Singer, The Pom Pom Girls	4 episodes	
2013	Thunder and Lightning	Thunder		
2013	Beware the Batman	Bethanie Ravencroft	3 episodes	
2013–14	Xiaolin Chronicles	Wuya, Tigress, MGVC Leader		
2014	Kung Fu Panda: Legends of Awesomeness	Ho, Pig	Episode: "Po Picks a Pocket"	
2014	Ben 10: Omniverse	Frightwig	Episode: "Something Zombozo This Way Comes"	
2014	Rick and Morty	Giant Woman	Episode: "Meeseeks and Destroy"	
2014	TripTank	Matilda, Ugly Blonde Woman	Episode: "Buck Wild"	
2014	Avengers Assemble	Darlene Wilson	Episode: "One Little Thing"	
2014	The Tom and Jerry Show	Beatie, Woman	11 episodes	
2014	The Boondocks	Desperate Friend #2	Episode: "Early Bird Special"	
2014–15	Breadwinners	SwaySway's Mom, Mrs. Juniper Furfle, Background Dancers		
2014–15	Sheriff Callie's Wild West	Priscilla Skunk		
2015–17	Penn Zero: Part-Time Hero	Merchant, additional voices	4 episodes	
2015–17	Dawn of the Croods	Ugga, Pat, Clip, Pup Howler, various voices	51 episodes	
2015	Transformers: Rescue Bots	Maura the Magnificent	Episode: "More Than Meets the Eye"	
2015	Golan the Insatiable	Various voices		
2015	Fresh Beat Band of Spies	Dakota Koder	Episode: "Dance Bots"	
2015	Moonbeam City	Quasar Daniels, Aiaiaia	3 episodes	
2015–18	Dinotrux	Ace, Drillian, Stegarbasaur #3	36 episodes	
2015–18	Miles from Tomorrowland	Maya Kitumba, Tech Bots, Mikrons, Cannon Interface	5 episodes	
2015–19	Guardians of the Galaxy	Nebula, Victoria, Trapped Girl		
2016–18	Voltron: Legendary Defender	Witch Haggar	34 episodes	
2016–19	Ben 10	Shasta, Betts McCabe, Hildie	3 episodes	
2016	Mixels	Jamzy, Teacher		
2016	Kulipari: An Army of Frogs	Skink Mercenary		
2016	Nostalgia Critic	Penny, Herself	Episode: "Inspector Gadget Saves Christmas"	
2016	Ultimate Spider-Man	Madame Web, Vampire White Tiger	3 episodes	
2016–17	Rolling with the Ronks!	Mama		
2017	The Powerpuff Girls	Green Wing	Episode: "Green Wing"	
2017	Ginger Snaps	Rachel	Main role	
2017	Vampirina	Edna, various voices	Main role	
2017	Be Cool, Scooby-Doo!	Tess	Episode: "Night of the Upsetting Shorts"	
2017	Lego Marvel Super Heroes – Guardians of the Galaxy: The Thanos Threat	Nebula		
2017, 2019	DuckTales	Amunet, Mummies, Pink Terra-firmian	2 episodes	
2018, 2023	The Loud House	Paula, Megan, Soccer Coach, Boy, various voices	2 episodes	
2018–19	Teen Titans Go!	Beast Girl, Elasti-Girl	5 episodes	
2018–19	Rise of the Teenage Mutant Ninja Turtles	Jessica Jaclyne, Fire Yokai, Mrs. Linda Stockboy, additional voices	7 episodes	
2019	Milo Murphy's Law	Additional voices	Episode: "Look at This Ship"	
2019	Tigtone	Lore Mastra, Axeanne, Beconka, Kid Tigtone		
2019	Harvey Street Kids	Zoe, Roary Uproar	8 episodes	
2019–21	DC Super Hero Girls	Catwoman	Recurring role	
2019–23	Puppy Dog Pals	Ana, Hero, additional voices	39 episodes	
2020	Muppet Babies	Skeeter	Episode: "Win a Twin/Skeeter and the Super Girls"	
2020–21	Lazor Wulf	Additional voices	Also the voice director in season 2	
2020–21	Big Hero 6: The Series	Crushroom	6 episodes	
2021–22	Kid Cosmic	Queen Xhan	12 episodes	
2021–26	Rugrats	Susie Carmichael, Police Officer	Won – NAACP Image Award for Outstanding Character Voice-Over Performance (Television)	
2021	Masters of the Universe: Revelation	Priestess, Kuduk	6 episodes	
2021	Amphibia	Dr. Amelia Frakes	Episode: "If You Give a Frog a Cookie"	
2021	Saturday Morning All Star Hits!	Various	Main cast	
2021	A Tale Dark & Grimm	Mother Tree		
2021—present	The Patrick Star Show	Bunny Star, Granny Tentacles, additional voices	Main cast	
2022–26	The Proud Family: Louder and Prouder	Bufferina, Rochelle, Make Up Boy Fan, Peabo		
2022	Kamp Koral: SpongeBob's Under Years	Bunny Star	Episode: "Help Not Wanted"	
2022	Hamster & Gretel	Ms. Weems	Episode: "Close Shave"	
2022–23	Pretzel and the Puppies	Jules	2 episodes	
2022–24	The Legend of Vox Machina	Raishan, Salda, Otherworldly Voice	Recurring role	
2022–24	Spirit Rangers	Lizard, DeeDee, Wolf, Villain Von Nomanners, Otter Spirit, Dandelion Spirit	Main cast	
2023	Star Wars: Young Jedi Adventures	Marlaa Jinara	4 episodes	
2024	Tiny Toons Looniversity	Elmyra Duff	Episode: "Whatever Happened to Babsy Bunny?"	
2024	Moon Girl and Devil Dinosaur	Aragorn	Episode: "The Devil You Know"	
2025	Goldie	Grandma Shirley, Madame Cheese	Episode: "Pilroy"	
2026	President Curtis	David the Swamp Witch	Episode: "David"	
2026	Bass X Machina	Ahni	Main cast	

=== Live-action film roles ===
List of performances in live-action films
Year	Title	Role	Notes	Source
1987	Wild Thing	Lisa	Feature film	
1987	Bay Coven	Jazz Singer	Television film	
1987	Hearts of Fire	Colt's Band Member	Feature film	
1991	Perfect Crimes	Cheryl	Television film	
1995	Tuesday Morning Ride	Unknown	Short film	
2002	Kermit's Swamp Years	Pilgrim, Kermit's Mom, Star (voice)	Direct-to-video	
2003	Blizzard	Penelope (voice)	Feature film	
2005	Free Lunch for Brad Whitman	Kristi	Short film	
2007	Callback	Student		
2013	I Know That Voice	Herself	Documentary film	
2026	Breathe Again	Vanessa	Television film	

=== Live-action television series roles ===
List of performances in live-action television
Year	Title	Role	Notes	Source
1985	Night Heat	Karen Simmons	Episode: "Crossfire"	
1986	Seeing Things	Unknown	Episode: "Optical Illusion"	
1988–93	A Different World	Winifred "Freddie" Brooks	Seasons 2–6	
1994	Living Single	Summer	Episode: "Love Thy Neighbor"	
1994	The Fresh Prince of Bel-Air	Lisa Adams	Episode: "The Harder They Fall"	
1994–95	Sweet Justice	Reese Daulkins	Nominated – NAACP Image Award for Outstanding Actress in a Drama Series (1996)	
1995	Courthouse	Danni	4 episodes	
2016, 2022	Atlanta	Kid #1/Kid #2 (voices) / Cree	Episodes: "B.A.N.", "It Was All a Dream"	
2019–22	Better Things	Lenny	8 episodes	
2019	Queen Sugar	Dr. Octavia Laurent	2 episodes	
2020	Woke	Paper Bag (voice)	2 episodes	
2021	What We Do In The Shadows	Jan	Episode: "The Wellness Center"	
2022	Cosmic Love	The Astro Chamber (voice)	10 episodes	
2023	Swarm	Rashida's mom	Episode: "Only God Makes Happy Endings"	
2023	Run the World	Dr. Monica Mitchell	Episode: "My New Therapist Says..."	
2024–present	Abbott Elementary	Rosalyn Inez	Season 3–present	
2025	Ironheart	Madeleine Stanton	2 episodes	
2026	A Different World (2026)	Winifred "Freddie" Brooks	Recurring role	

=== Video games ===
List of voice performances in video games
Year	Title	Voice Role	Notes	Source
1996	Tiny Toon Adventures: Buster and the Beanstalk	Elmyra Duff		
1997	Fallout	Tandi		
1998	Fallout 2	Joanne Lynette		
1999	Tiny Toon Adventures: Toonenstein	Elmyra Duff		
1999	Rugrats: Studio Tour	Susie Carmichael		
2000	M&M's The Lost Formulas	Green		
2000	Sabrina: The Animated Series: Magical Adventure	Chloe		
2001	Atlantis: The Lost Empire	Kida, Atlantean Child		
2001	Final Fantasy X	Belgemine		
2001	Baldur's Gate: Dark Alliance	Osala, Adrianna		
2001	Clifford the Big Red Dog Learning Activities	Cleo, Mrs. Diller		
2001	Atlantis The Lost Empire: Search for the Journal	Additional voices		
2001	Tiny Toon Adventures: Defenders of the Universe	Elmyra Duff	Cancelled game	
2002	Rugrats: Royal Ransom	Susie Carmichael		
2002	Clifford the Big Red Dog Musical Memory Games	Cleo, Mrs. Queenie Diller		
2002	Rugrats Munchin Land	Susie Carmichael		
2002	Run Like Hell	Samantha		
2003	Freelancer	Dr. Kendra Sinclair		
2003	Final Fantasy X-2	Lenne		
2003	Arc the Lad: Twilight of the Spirits	Tatjana		
2003	Rugrats Go Wild!	Susie Carmichael		
2003	Clifford the Big Red Dog: Phonics	Cleo		
2003	Lords of EverQuest	Solruua		
2004	Baldur's Gate: Dark Alliance II	Additional voices		
2004	Pitfall: The Lost Expedition	Micay		
2004	X-Men Legends	Magma		
2005	Fantastic Four	Alicia Masters, additional voices		
2005	Codename: Kids Next Door – Operation: V.I.D.E.O.G.A.M.E.	Numbuh Five, Delightful Children From Down the Lane, Cree Lincoln		
2005	Tony Hawk's American Wasteland	Mindy		
2006	Black	MacCarver		
2006	Driver: Parallel Lines	Additional voices		
2006	Scarface: The World Is Yours	Venus		
2006	The Legend of Spyro: A New Beginning	Cynder		
2006	Superman Returns	The Citizens of Metropolis		
2006	Bratz Forever Diamondz	Mandy		
2007	Mass Effect	Macha Doyle, Consort Attendant		
2009	Cartoon Network Universe: FusionFall	Numbuh Five		
2009	inFamous	Additional voices		
2009	Watchmen: The End Is Nigh	Additional voices		
2009	Batman: Arkham Asylum	Dr. Penelope Young		
2009	Brütal Legend	Dominatrices		
2009	Marvel Super Hero Squad	Storm		
2009	Dragon Age: Origins	Violent Elf Female		
2010	Crackdown 2	Catalina Thorn		
2010	StarCraft II: Wings of Liberty	Executor Selendis		
2010	Marvel Super Hero Squad: The Infinity Gauntlet	She-Hulk		
2011	Knights Contract	Straeggele		
2012	Unit 13	Command		
2012	Kid Icarus: Uprising	Medusa		
2012	Diablo III	Auriel		
2012	World of Warcraft: Mists of Pandaria	Scout Captain Elsia		
2013	Skylanders: Swap Force	Roller Brawl		
2013	Young Justice: Legacy	Aquagirl, Rocket		
2014	Lightning Returns: Final Fantasy XIII	Additional voices		
2014	Lichdom: Battlemage	Witch, Alchemist		
2014	Broken Age	Morelia, Drumstick Maiden, Teledoor		
2014	WildStar	Kit Brinny, Chua, Exiled Female		
2014	Destiny	Guardian (EXO) Female		
2014	Skylanders: Trap Team	Roller Brawl		
2015	StarCraft II: Legacy of the Void	Selendis		
2015	Disney Princess: Palace Pets	Treasure		
2015	Skylanders: SuperChargers	Roller Brawl		
2015	Star Wars: The Old Republic: Knights of the Fallen Empire	Hylo Visz, additional voices		
2016	Heroes of the Storm	Auriel		
2016	Skylanders: Imaginators	Roller Brawl		
2016	Star Wars: The Old Republic: Knights of the Eternal Throne	Hylo Visz, additional voices		
2017	Destiny 2	Exo Player (Female)		
2017	DreamWorks' Voltron VR Chronicles	Haggar		
2018	Naruto to Boruto: Shinobi Striker	Female Avatar 4		
2018	Lego DC Super-Villains	Mercy Graves, Livewire, Mad Harriet, Goon		
2021	DC Super Hero Girls: Teen Power	Catwoman		
2022	Nickelodeon Extreme Tennis	Susie Carmichael		
2022	Nickelodeon Kart Racers 3: Slime Speedway	Susie Carmichael		
2025	Nicktoons & The Dice of Destiny	Susie Carmichael		

== Discography ==
=== Albums ===
- Appeared on the Juno Award-nominated album I Lost My Pet Lizard (1979)
- Appeared as Debbie on the Juno Award-nominated Canadian Sesame Street album Big Bird & Oscar the Grouch: Camping in Canada (1981)
- Womb Amnesia – (1993) (with her band Subject to Change)
- Street Faërie – (1999)

=== Singles ===
- "Revelation Sunshine"

== Awards and nominations ==
Award	Year (Note: Indicates the year of ceremony.)	Category	Nominated work	Result	Ref.
Annie Awards	1999	Outstanding Voice Acting in an Animated Television Production	Steven Spielberg Presents Pinky, Elmyra & The Brain	Nominated	
Black Reel Awards	2020	Outstanding Guest Actress, Drama Series	Queen Sugar	Nominated	
Black Reel Awards	2024	Outstanding Guest Performance in a Comedy Series	Abbott Elementary	Nominated	
Daytime Emmy Awards	2001	Outstanding Performer in an Animated Program	Clifford the Big Red Dog	Nominated	
NAACP Image Awards	1996	Outstanding Lead Actress in a Drama Series	Sweet Justice	Nominated	
NAACP Image Awards	2002	Outstanding Performance by a Youth	A Rugrats Kwanzaa	Nominated	
NAACP Image Awards	2004	Outstanding Performance by a Youth	All Grown Up!	Nominated	
NAACP Image Awards	2022	Outstanding Character Voice-Over Performance (Television)	Rugrats	Won	
NAACP Image Awards	2023	Outstanding Character Voice-Over Performance (Television)	Rugrats	Nominated	
NAACP Image Awards	2024	Outstanding Character Voice-Over Performance (Television)	Rugrats	Nominated	
NAACP Image Awards	2025	Outstanding Character Voice-Over Performance (Television)	Rugrats	Won	
NAACP Image Awards	2025	Outstanding Character Voice-Over Performance (Television)	Spirit Rangers	Nominated	
NAACP Image Awards	2025	Outstanding Guest Performance	Abbott Elementary	Nominated	
Children's and Family Emmy Awards	2023	Outstanding Voice Performance in a Preschool Animated Program	Spirit Rangers	Nominated	
Children's and Family Emmy Awards	2024	Outstanding Voice Performance in a Preschool Animated Program	Spirit Rangers	Nominated	
