= List of PlayStation (console) games (A–L) =

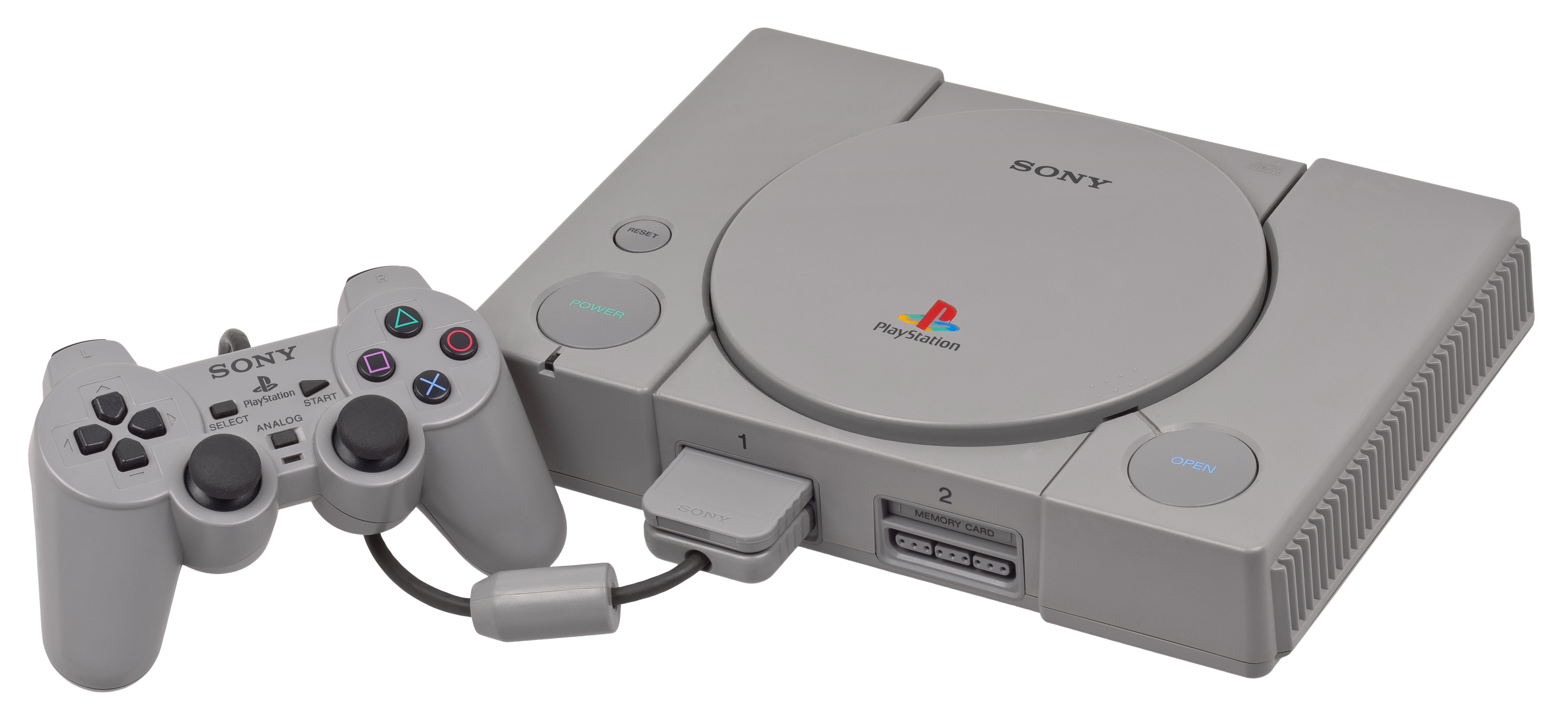
The Sony PlayStation console.

This is a list of games for the Sony PlayStation video game system, organized alphabetically by name. There are often different names for the same game in different regions. The final licensed PlayStation game released in Japan (not counting re-releases) was Black/Matrix 00 on May 13, 2004; counting re-releases, the final licensed game released in Japan was Strider Hiryū on October 24, 2006. The final licensed game released in North America was FIFA Football 2005 on October 12, 2004, and the final licensed game released in Europe was either Schnappi das kleine Krokodil – 3 Fun-Games on July 18, 2005, or Moorhuhn X on July 20, 2005. Additionally, homebrew games were created using the Sony PlayStation Net Yaroze. Games were being reprinted as late as 2008 with Metal Gear Solid in Metal Gear Solid: The Essential Collection.

== Games list (A–L) ==
There are currently 4053 (Note: This number is always up to date by this script.) games across both this page (A to L) and the remainder of the list from M to Z.

For a chronological list, click the sort button in any of the available region's column. Games dated December 3, 1994 (JP), September 9, 1995 (NA), September 29, 1995 (EU), and November 15, 1995 (AU) are launch titles of each region respectively.

Key
P Essentials (PlayStation) (Platinum)	PS2 Also on PS2

Title	Developer(s)	Publisher(s)	Regions released			Options	Ref.
Title	Developer(s)	Publisher(s)	Japan	Europe/PAL	North America	Options	Ref.
007 Racing	Eutechnyx	EA Games, MGM Interactive	Unreleased	December 15, 2000	November 20, 2000	P	
007: The World Is Not Enough	Black Ops Entertainment	EA Games, MGM Interactive	Unreleased	November 17, 2000	November 8, 2000	P	
007: Tomorrow Never Dies	Black Ops Entertainment	Electronic Arts, MGM Interactive	February 10, 2000	November 25, 1999	November 16, 1999	P	
100 Manyen Quiz Hunter	FPS	FPS	December 23, 1998	Unreleased	Unreleased		
101 Dalmatians II: Patch's London Adventure	Backbone Entertainment	Eidos Interactive	Unreleased	Unreleased	October 14, 2003		
10101: Will the Starship	Sound Technology	Sound Technology	November 6, 1997	Unreleased	Unreleased		
102 Dalmatians: Puppies to the Rescue	Crystal Dynamics	Eidos Interactive	Unreleased	December 20, 2000	November 15, 2000		
19:03 Ueno-hatsu Yakou Ressha	Visit	Visit	March 4, 1999	Unreleased	Unreleased		
1Xtreme •ESPN Extreme Games	Sony Interactive Studios America	Sony Computer Entertainment	May 24, 1996	December 1995	September 9, 1995		
2002 FIFA World Cup	EA Canada	EA Sports	Unreleased	April 26, 2002	April 23, 2002	PS2	
2999-Nen no Game Kids	Sony Computer Entertainment	Sony Computer Entertainment	December 23, 1998	Unreleased	Unreleased		
2Xtreme	Sony Interactive Studios America	Sony Computer Entertainment	Unreleased	March 6, 1997	October 31, 1996		
360: Three Sixty	Smart Dog	Cryo Interactive	Unreleased	July 1999	Unreleased		
3D Baseball •3D Baseball: The Majors^{JP}	Crystal Dynamics	Crystal Dynamics^{NA}, BMG Interactive^{JP}	February 28, 1997	Unreleased	October 31, 1996		
3D Shooting Tsukuru	Success	ASCII Entertainment	December 20, 1996	Unreleased	Unreleased		
3×3 Eyes: Kyuusei Koushu	Nihon Create	Xing Entertainment	August 11, 1995	Unreleased	Unreleased		
3×3 Eyes: Tenrinou Genmu	Nihon Create	King Records	August 6, 1998	Unreleased	Unreleased		
3Xtreme	989 Studios	989 Studios	Unreleased	Unreleased	March 31, 1999		
40 Winks •Dream Story : Les Aventures de Tim et Lola^{FR}	Eurocom	GT Interactive	Unreleased	November 1999	November 14, 1999		
4-4-2 Soccer	Arc Developments	Virgin Interactive Entertainment	Unreleased	August 1997	Unreleased		
5 Star Racing	Kung Fu Games	Phoenix Games	Unreleased	November 15, 2003	Unreleased		
70's Robot Anime Geppy-X	Aroma	Aroma	May 27, 1999	Unreleased	Unreleased		
98 Kōshien	Magical Company	Magical Company	June 18, 1998	Unreleased	Unreleased		
99 Kōshien	Magical Company	Magical Company	June 17, 1999	Unreleased	Unreleased		
A Nanjarin	To One	To One	June 11, 1998	Unreleased	Unreleased		
A2 Racer III: Europa Tour •Autobahn Raser^{DE}	Davilex	Davilex	Unreleased	2002	Unreleased		
A.IV Evolution: A-Ressha de Ikou 4	Artdink	Artdink	December 3, 1994	Unreleased	Unreleased		
A5: A-Ressha de Ikou 5	Artdink	Artdink	December 4, 1997	Unreleased	Unreleased		
A-Ressha de Ikou Z: Mezase! Tairiku Oudan	Artdink	Artdink	May 4, 1999	Unreleased	Unreleased		
A-Train (Note: update for A.IV Evolution: A-Ressha de Ikou 4.) •A.IV Evolution Global: A-Ressha de Ikou 4 Global^{JP} •A-IV Evolution Global^{PAL}	Artdink	Maxis^{NA}, Artdink^{JP}, Sony Computer Entertainment^{PAL}	November 22, 1995	November 1996	June 5, 1996		
AbalaBurn	Tamsoft	Takara	August 20, 1998	Unreleased	Unreleased		
Ace Combat 2	Namco	Namco ^{JP}, Namco Hometek ^{NA}, Sony Computer Entertainment^{PAL}	May 30, 1997	October 1997	August 15, 1997		
Ace Combat 3: Electrosphere	Namco	Namco ^{JP}, Namco Hometek ^{NA}, Sony Computer Entertainment^{PAL}	May 27, 1999	January 21, 2000	March 2, 2000	P	
Aces of the Air •Simple 1500 Series Vol. 95: The Hikouki^{JP}	Highwaystar	D3 Publisher^{JP}, Agetec^{NA}	May 23, 2002	Unreleased	September 26, 2002		
Acid	ISCO	Taki	July 8, 1999	Unreleased	Unreleased		
Aconcagua	SCEI	SCEI	June 1, 2000	Unreleased	Unreleased		
Action Bass	Vingt-et-un Systems	Take 2 Interactive, Syscom^{JP}	December 9, 1999	September 29, 2000	July 14, 2000		
Action Man: Destruction X	Blitz Games	The 3DO Company	Unreleased	November 2000	Unreleased		
Action Man: Operation Extreme •Action Man: Mission Xtreme^{PAL}	Blitz Games	Hasbro Interactive	Unreleased	June 25, 2000	November 30, 2000		
Activision Classic Games for the Atari 2600	Gray Matter	Activision	Unreleased	Unreleased	September 30, 1998		
Actua Golf •VR Golf '97^{NA}	Gremlin Interactive	Gremlin Interactive^{PAL}, Interplay^{NA}, Naxat Soft^{JP}	April 11, 1997	October 1996	October 15, 1996		
Actua Golf 2 •Fox Sports Golf '99^{NA}	Gremlin Interactive	Gremlin Interactive^{PAL}, Fox Interactive^{NA}	Unreleased	September 1997	June 30, 1998		
Actua Golf 3	Gremlin Interactive	Gremlin Interactive	Unreleased	1999	Unreleased		
Actua Ice Hockey	Gremlin Interactive	Gremlin Interactive^{PAL}, Konami^{JP}	December 17, 1998	February 1998	Unreleased		
Actua Ice Hockey 2	Gremlin Interactive	Gremlin Interactive	Unreleased	April 1, 1999	Unreleased		
Actua Soccer •Ran Soccer^{DE} •VR Soccer '96^{NA}	Gremlin Interactive	Gremlin Interactive^{PAL}, Naxat Soft^{JP}, Interplay^{NA}	July 19, 1996	March 1996	October 31, 1996	P	
Actua Soccer 2	Gremlin Interactive	Gremlin Interactive	Unreleased	November 1997	Unreleased		
Actua Soccer 3	Gremlin Interactive	Gremlin Interactive	Unreleased	December 1998	Unreleased		
Actua Soccer Club Edition	Gremlin Interactive	Gremlin Interactive	Unreleased	May 1997	Unreleased		
Actua Tennis	Gremlin Interactive	Gremlin Interactive	Unreleased	1998	Unreleased		
Ad Lib Ouji ...to Fuyukai na Nakama-tachi!?	Nippon Telenet	Nippon Telenet	December 19, 2002	Unreleased	Unreleased		
Addie no Okurimono	Sony Computer Entertainment	Sony Computer Entertainment	February 3, 2000	Unreleased	Unreleased		
Adiboo & Paziral's Secret	Coktel Vision	Vivendi Universal Games	Unreleased	October 24, 2003	Unreleased		
Adibou Et L'Ombre Verte	Coktel Vision	Sony Computer Entertainment	Unreleased	October 2, 2001	Unreleased		
Adidas Power Soccer	Psygnosis	Psygnosis	Unreleased	June 1996	August 31, 1996	P	
Adidas Power Soccer 2	Shen	Psygnosis	Unreleased	1998	Unreleased		
Adidas Power Soccer International 97	Psygnosis	Psygnosis	Unreleased	April 1997	Unreleased		
Adidas Power Soccer 98	Shen	Psygnosis	Unreleased	June 1998	June 24, 1998		
Advan Racing	Atlus	Atlus	November 19, 1998	Unreleased	Unreleased		
Advanced V.G.	TGL	TGL	April 19, 1996	Unreleased	Unreleased		
Advanced V.G. 2	TGL	TGL	September 23, 1998	Unreleased	Unreleased		
The Adventure of Little Ralph	New Corporation	Ertain Corporation, New Corporation	June 3, 1999	Unreleased	Unreleased		
The Adventures of Lomax •Lomax^{PAL,JP}	Psygnosis	Psygnosis	December 18, 1997	November 1996	October 22, 1996		
AFL 99	EA Sports	EA Sports	Unreleased	June 1999	Unreleased		
Afraid Gear	Office Create	Asmik Ace Entertainment	October 29, 1998	Unreleased	Unreleased		
Afraid Gear Another	Office Create	Office Create	June 14, 2001	Unreleased	Unreleased		
Afro Ken: The Puzzle	Axes Art Amuse	Bandai	October 25, 2001	Unreleased	Unreleased		
Agent Armstrong •Agent Armstrong: Himitsu Shirei Daisakusen^{JP}	King of the Jungle	Virgin Interactive Entertainment^{PAL}, W.I.Z^{JP}	December 4, 1997	September 18, 1997	Unreleased		
Agile Warrior F-111X •Agile Warrior^{JP}	Black Ops Entertainment	Virgin Interactive Entertainment	January 13, 1996	March 1996	November 21, 1995		
AI Mahjong 2000	i4	i4	November 25, 1999	Unreleased	Unreleased		
AI Mahjong Selection	i4	i4	July 25, 2002	Unreleased	Unreleased		
AI Shogi	Soft Bank	Soft Bank	November 22, 1995	Unreleased	Unreleased		
AI Shogi 2	GameBank	GameBank	December 25, 1997	Unreleased	Unreleased		
AI Shogi 2 Deluxe (Note: update for AI Shogi 2.)	i4	i4	September 22, 1999	Unreleased	Unreleased		
AI Shogi Selection	Hamster	Hamster	May 23, 2002	Unreleased	Unreleased		
Air Combat •Ace Combat^{JP}	Namco, Arsys Software	Namco ^{JP}, Namco Hometek ^{NA}, Sony Computer Entertainment^{PAL}	June 30, 1995	September 29, 1995	September 9, 1995	P	
Air Hockey •Hooockey!!^{JP}	Mud Duck Productions	Success^{JP}, Midas Interactive Entertainment^{PAL}, Mud Duck Productions^{NA}	May 25, 2000	April 5, 2002	September 10, 2003		
Air Management '96	Koei	Koei	March 22, 1996	Unreleased	Unreleased		
Air Race Championship	Metro	Xing Entertainment	March 4, 1999	Unreleased	Unreleased		
AirGrave	Santos	Santos	November 29, 1996	Unreleased	Unreleased		
Aironauts	Red Lemon Studios	Red Storm Entertainment	Unreleased	August 1999	Unreleased		
The Airs	Victor Interactive Software	Victor Interactive Software	March 25, 1999	Unreleased	Unreleased		
Aishiau Kotoshika Dekinai	Coconuts Japan	Coconuts Japan	February 11, 1998	Unreleased	Unreleased		
Aitakute... Your Smiles in My Heart	KCET	Konami	March 16, 2000	Unreleased	Unreleased		
Akagawa Jirou: Majotachi no Nemuri: Fukkatsusai	Open Sesame	Victor Interactive Software	April 15, 1999	Unreleased	Unreleased		
Akagawa Jirou: Yasoukyoku	Open Sesame	Victor Interactive Software	July 16, 1998	Unreleased	Unreleased		
Akagawa Jirou: Yasoukyoku 2	Office Create	Victor Interactive Software	June 14, 2001	Unreleased	Unreleased		
Akagi: Touhaiden	Micronet co., Ltd.	Micronet co., Ltd.	January 13, 1996	Unreleased	Unreleased		
Akazu no Ma	Visit	Visit	May 9, 1997	Unreleased	Unreleased		
Akuji the Heartless	Crystal Dynamics	Eidos Interactive	Unreleased	February 1999	January 22, 1999		
Alex Ferguson's Player Manager 2001^{PAL} •Guy Roux Manager 2001^{FR} •DSF Fussball Manager 2001^{DE}	Anco Software	The 3DO Company^{NA}, Ubi Soft^{DE,FR}	Unreleased	November 24, 2000^{PAL} December 2000^{FR} June 21, 2001^{DE}	Unreleased	PS2	
Alex Ferguson's Player Manager 2002^{PAL} •DSS Fussball Manager 2002^{DE} •Guy Roux Manager 2002^{FR}	Anco Software	Ubi Soft	Unreleased	May 14, 2002^{DE} May 17, 2002^{PAL}	Unreleased		
Alexi Lalas International Soccer •Bomba:98^{PAL} •Golden Goal 98^{PAL} •Mundial:98^{PAL} •Three Lions^{PAL} •Pro : Foot Contest '98^{FR}	Z-Axis	BMG Interactive^{PAL}, Take-Two Interactive^{PAL,NA} (Alexei Lalas, Golden Goal 98)	Unreleased	April 17, 1998	April 28, 1999		
Alfred Chicken	Möbius Entertainment	Sony Computer Entertainment	Unreleased	2002^{AUS} April 12, 2002^{PAL}	Unreleased		
Alice in Cyberland	Glams	Glams	December 20, 1996	Unreleased	Unreleased		
Alien: Resurrection	Argonaut Games	Fox Interactive	Unreleased	December 1, 2000	October 10, 2000		
Alien Trilogy	Probe Entertainment	Acclaim Entertainment	May 31, 1996	March 29, 1996	February 29, 1996	P	
ALIVE	General Entertainment Co. Ltd.	General Entertainment Co. Ltd.	August 6, 1998	Unreleased	Unreleased		
All Japan Woman Pro Wrestling	TEN	GW	July 23, 1998	Unreleased	Unreleased		
All-Star 1997 featuring Frank Thomas	Iguana Entertainment	Acclaim Entertainment	Unreleased	Unreleased	July 10, 1997		
All-Star Action	Mere Mortals	Phoenix Games	Unreleased	2003	Unreleased		
All-Star Mahjong: Kareinaru Shoubushi Kara no Chousen	Pony Canyon	Pony Canyon	September 18, 1997	Unreleased	Unreleased		
All-Star Racing	Kung Fu Games	Mud Duck Productions ^{NA}, Midas Interactive Entertainment^{PAL}	Unreleased	October 6, 2002	October 6, 2002		
All-Star Racing 2	Mud Duck Productions	Mud Duck Productions ^{NA}, Midas Interactive Entertainment^{PAL}	Unreleased	July 2, 2003	April 24, 2003		
All-Star Slammin' D-ball^{NA} •Simple 1500 Series Vol. 76: The Dodge Ball^{JP} •Super Slammin' Dodgeball^{EU}	Access	D3 Publisher^{JP}, Agetec^{NA}, Midas Interactive Entertainment^{PAL}	October 25, 2001	May 2, 2003	February 12, 2002		
All Star Soccer	Eidos Interactive	Eidos Interactive	Unreleased	August 1, 1997	Unreleased		
All Star Tennis '99 •Yannick Noah All Star Tennis '99^{FR}	Smart Dog	Ubi Soft	February 12, 1999	November 20, 1998	Unreleased		
All Star Tennis 2000	Aqua Pacific Ltd.	Ubi Soft	Unreleased	August 18, 2000	Unreleased		
All Star Watersports	Phoenix Games	Phoenix Games	Unreleased	March 14, 2003	Unreleased		
Allied General	SSI	SSI	Unreleased	June 1, 1997	October 10, 1996		
Alnam no Kiba: Juuzoku Juuni Shinto Densetsu	Right Stuff	Right Stuff	February 2, 1996	Unreleased	Unreleased		
Alnam no Tsubasa: Shoujin no Sora no Kanata e	Right Stuff	Right Stuff	December 25, 1997	Unreleased	Unreleased		
Alone in the Dark: One-Eyed Jack's Revenge^{NA} •Alone in the Dark: Jack is Back^{PAL}	Infogrames Multimedia	Infogrames Multimedia ^{EU}, I-Motion^{NA}	November 8, 1996	May 3, 1996	August 22, 1996		
Alone in the Dark: The New Nightmare	Darkworks	Infogrames	Unreleased	May 18, 2001	June 18, 2001	P	
Alundra •The Adventures of Alundra^{PAL}	Matrix Software	Sony Computer Entertainment^{JP}, Working Designs^{NA}, Psygnosis^{PAL}	April 11, 1997	June 5, 1998	January 8, 1998		
Alundra 2: A New Legend Begins	Matrix Software	Sony Computer Entertainment^{JP}, Activision	November 18, 1999	June 2000	February 29, 2000		
The Amazing Virtual Sea-Monkeys	Creature Labs	Kemco	Unreleased	June 19, 2002	December 20, 2002		
America Oudan Ultra-Quiz	Pegasus Japan	Victor Interactive Software	February 23, 1996	Unreleased	Unreleased		
American Pool	DigiCube	Digicube^{JP}, Mud Duck Productions^{NA}, Midas Interactive^{PAL}	January 31, 2002	June 13, 2003	June 5, 2003		
Amerzone	Microids	Casterman	Unreleased	December 13, 1999	Unreleased		
Anastasia	Midas Interactive	Midas Interactive	Unreleased	April 12, 2001	Unreleased		
Ancient Roman: Power of Dark Side	Nichibutsu	Nichibutsu	April 23, 1998	Unreleased	Unreleased		
Andretti Racing	Electronic Arts	Electronic Arts	Unreleased	October 1996	November 30, 1996		
Angel Blade: Neo Tokyo Guardians	Nippon	Ichi Soft	July 3, 1997	Unreleased	Unreleased		
Angel Graffiti: Anathe no Profile	Coconuts Japan	Coconuts Japan	July 26, 1996	Unreleased	Unreleased		
Angelique Duet (Note: update for Angelique Special.)	Koei	Koei	July 30, 1998	Unreleased	Unreleased		
Angelique History	Koei	Koei	March 30, 2000	Unreleased	Unreleased		
Angelique Special	Koei	Koei	March 29, 1996	Unreleased	Unreleased		
Angelique Special 2	Koei	Koei	April 11, 1997	Unreleased	Unreleased		
Angelique: Tenkū no Requiem	Koei	Koei	February 4, 1999	Unreleased	Unreleased		
Angolmois 99	Success	Success	August 26, 1999	Unreleased	Unreleased		
Animal Football	The Code Monkeys	Phoenix Games	Unreleased	July 26, 2003	Unreleased	PS2	
Animal Snap	Ignition Entertainment	Ignition Entertainment	Unreleased	September 19, 2003	Unreleased		
Animaniacs: Ten Pin Alley	Saffire	ASC Games	Unreleased	Unreleased	January 10, 1998		
Animetic Story Game 1: Cardcaptor Sakura	Arika	Arika	August 5, 1999	Unreleased	Unreleased		
Animorphs: Shattered Reality	SingleTrac	Infogrames	Unreleased	Unreleased	August 30, 2000		
Ankh: Tutankhamen no Nazo	Ray Corporation	Ray Corporation	November 27, 1997	Unreleased	Unreleased		
Anoko Doko Noko	Success	Success	August 6, 1998	Unreleased	Unreleased		
Another Memories	Starlight Marry	Hearty Robin	June 18, 1998	Unreleased	Unreleased		
Another Mind	Squaresoft	Squaresoft	November 12, 1998	Unreleased	Unreleased		
Ao no Roku-gō	Bandai	Bandai	September 28, 2000	Unreleased	Unreleased		
Ao Zora to Nakama Tachi: Yume no Bouken Plus	MTO	MTO	November 13, 2003	Unreleased	Unreleased		
Aoki Ookami to Shiroki Mejika: Genchou Hishi	Koei	Koei	September 17, 1998	Unreleased	Unreleased		
Ape Escape •Saru! Get You!^{JP}	Sony Computer Entertainment Japan	Sony Computer Entertainment	June 25, 1999	July 2, 1999	May 31, 1999	P	
Apocalypse	Neversoft	Activision^{PAL,NA}, Success^{JP}	September 22, 1999	November 1998	November 18, 1998		
Aqua GT	East Point Software	Take 2 Interactive	Unreleased	January 26, 2001	Unreleased		
Aqua Paradise: Boku no Suizokukan	Open Sesame	Victor Interactive Software	December 28, 2000	Unreleased	Unreleased		
Aquanaut's Holiday	Artdink	Artdink^{JP}, SCEA^{NA}, SCEE^{PAL}	June 30, 1995	October 1996	November 21, 1996		
Aquanaut no Kyuujitsu: Memories of Summer 1996 (Note: update for Aquanaut's Holiday.)	Artdink	Artdink	July 19, 1996	Unreleased	Unreleased		
Aquanaut no Kyuujitsu 2	Artdink	Artdink	July 1, 1999	Unreleased	Unreleased		
Aquarian Age: Tokyo Wars	Broccoli	ESP Software	May 25, 2000	Unreleased	Unreleased		
Arc the Lad	G-Craft	Sony Computer Entertainment	June 30, 1995	Unreleased	Unreleased		
Arc the Lad II	ARC Entertainment	Sony Computer Entertainment	November 1, 1996	Unreleased	Unreleased		
Arc the Lad III	ARC Entertainment	Sony Computer Entertainment	October 28, 1999	Unreleased	Unreleased		
Arc the Lad: Monster Game with Casino Game (Note: expansion for Arc the Lad II.) (Note: Contains casino mini-games.)	ARC Entertainment	Sony Computer Entertainment	July 31, 1997	Unreleased	Unreleased		
Arcade Hits: Crazy Climber	Nichibutsu	Hamster	May 23, 2002	Unreleased	Unreleased		
Arcade Hits: Moon Cresta	Nichibutsu	Nichibutsu	June 20, 2002	Unreleased	Unreleased		
Arcade Hits: Raiden	Hamster	Hamster	November 28, 2002	Unreleased	Unreleased		
Arcade Party Pak	Digital Eclipse Software	Midway Games	Unreleased	February 23, 2001	November 8, 1999		
Arcade's Greatest Hits: The Atari Collection 1	Digital Eclipse Software	Midway Games	Unreleased	December 1997	December 10, 1996		
Arcade's Greatest Hits: The Atari Collection 2	Digital Eclipse Software	Midway Games	Unreleased	April 17, 1998	February 1, 1998		
Arcade's Greatest Hits: The Midway Collection 2	Digital Eclipse Software	GT Interactive	Unreleased	Unreleased	November 30, 1997		
Archer Maclean's 3D Pool	Awesome Studios	Ignition Entertainment	Unreleased	October 17, 2003	Unreleased		
Are! Mo Kore? Mo Momotarou	System Sacom	System Sacom	October 4, 1996	Unreleased	Unreleased		
Area 51	Mesa Logic	Time Warner Interactive, Soft Bank^{JP}	March 20, 1997	May 1997	November 26, 1996		
Ark of Time	Trecision S.p.A.	Project Two Interactive BV	Unreleased	July 1998	Unreleased		
Arkana Senki Ludo	Falcon	Pai	July 9, 1998	Unreleased	Unreleased		
Arkanoid Returns	Taito	Taito	August 7, 1997	Unreleased	Unreleased		
Armed Fighter	Banpresto	Banpresto	March 4, 1999	Unreleased	Unreleased		
Armored Core	FromSoftware	FromSoftware^{JP}, Agetec^{NA}, Sony Computer Entertainment^{PAL}	July 10, 1997	June 1, 1998	October 31, 1997		
Armored Core: Master of Arena (Note: stand-alone expansion for Armored Core.)	FromSoftware	FromSoftware^{JP}, Agetec^{NA}	February 4, 1999	Unreleased	March 15, 2000		
Armored Core: Project Phantasma (Note: stand-alone expansion for Armored Core.)	FromSoftware	FromSoftware^{JP}, ASCII Entertainment^{NA}	December 4, 1997	Unreleased	September 30, 1998		
Armorines: Project S.W.A.R.M.	Distinctive Developments	Acclaim Entertainment	July 13, 2000	November 23, 2001	May 4, 2000		
Army Men 3D	The 3DO Company	The 3DO Company	Unreleased	January 28, 2000	February 28, 1999		
Army Men: Air Attack	The 3DO Company	The 3DO Company	Unreleased	July 28, 2000	February 11, 1999		
Army Men: Air Attack 2	The 3DO Company	The 3DO Company	Unreleased	November 24, 2000	September 26, 2000		
Army Men: Green Rogue •Army Men : Omega Soldier^{PAL}	The 3DO Company	The 3DO Company	Unreleased	April 27, 2001	April 13, 2001		
Army Men: Sarge's Heroes	The 3DO Company	The 3DO Company	Unreleased	August 17, 2000	February 23, 2000		
Army Men: Sarge's Heroes 2	The 3DO Company	The 3DO Company	Unreleased	November 24, 2000	November 21, 2000	PS2	
Army Men: World War •Army Men: Operation Meltdown^{PAL}	The 3DO Company	The 3DO Company	Unreleased	June 10, 2000	April 4, 2000		
Army Men: World War - Final Front •Army Men: Lock N' Load^{PAL}	The 3DO Company	The 3DO Company	Unreleased	March 30, 2001	March 30, 2001		
Army Men: World War - Land, Sea, Air	The 3DO Company	The 3DO Company	Unreleased	November 3, 2000	September 15, 2000		
Army Men: World War - Team Assault •Army Men: Team Assault^{PAL}	The 3DO Company	The 3DO Company	Unreleased	November 30, 2001	December 3, 2001		
Art Camion Geijutsuden	TYO	TYO	December 16, 1999	Unreleased	Unreleased		
Art Camion Sugorokuden	Affect	Affect	April 27, 2000	Unreleased	Unreleased		
Arthur! Ready to Race	Runecraft	Mattel Interactive, The Learning Company	Unreleased	Unreleased	December 6, 2000		
Arthur to Astaroth no Nazomakaimura: Incredible Toons	Magical Formation	Capcom	August 30, 1996	Unreleased	Unreleased		
Arubarea no Otome ~Uruwashi no Seishikitachi~	NCS	NCS	October 8, 1998	Unreleased	Unreleased		
Ason de Chinou Up	Gakken	Gakken	December 11, 2003	Unreleased	Unreleased		
Asonde Aiueo	Gakken	Gakken	May 29, 2003	Unreleased	Unreleased		
Asonde Kazu Suuji	Gakken	Gakken	May 29, 2003	Unreleased	Unreleased		
Assault: Retribution	Candle Light Studios	Telstar^{PAL}, Midway^{NA}	Unreleased	September 1998	November 19, 1998		
Assault Rigs	Psygnosis	Psygnosis	October 4, 1996	February 1996	February 1, 1996		
Assault Suits Valken 2	TamTam	NCS	July 29, 1999	Unreleased	Unreleased		
Asterix	Sourcery	Infogrames	Unreleased	March 1999	Unreleased		
Asterix & Obelix Take On Caesar	Tek 5	Cryo Interactive	Unreleased	June 1, 2000	Unreleased		
Asterix: Mega Madness	Unique Development Studios	Infogrames	Unreleased	June 29, 2001	Unreleased		
Asteroids	Activision	Syrox Developments	Unreleased	December 1998	November 23, 1998		
Astronōka	System Sacom	Enix	August 27, 1998	Unreleased	Unreleased		
Asuka 120% Final: Burning Fest. Final (Note: update for Asuka 120% Excellent: Burning Festival.)	Family Soft	Family Soft	May 27, 1999	Unreleased	Unreleased		
Asuka 120% Excellent: Burning Festival (Note: update for Asuka 120% Special Burning Fest.)	Fill-in-Cafe	SCEI	May 9, 1999	Unreleased	Unreleased		
Asuka 120% Special Burning Fest	Fill-in-Cafe	Family Soft	March 29, 1996	Unreleased	Unreleased		
Asuncia - Majou no Jubaku	E.O. Imagination	Xing Entertainment	November 27, 1997	Unreleased	Unreleased		
Atari Anniversary Edition Redux	Digital Eclipse Software	Infogrames	Unreleased	March 1, 2002	November 26, 2001		
Atelier Elie: The Alchemist of Salburg 2	Gust	Gust	December 17, 1998	Unreleased	Unreleased		
Athena: Awakening from the Ordinary Life	Yumekobo	SNK	March 11, 1999	Unreleased	Unreleased		
Athena no Kateiban: Family Game	Athena	Athena	March 22, 1996	Unreleased	Unreleased		
Atlantis: The Lost Empire	Eurocom Entertainment Software	Sony Computer Entertainment	Unreleased	October 19, 2001	June 14, 2001	P	
Atlantis, the Lost Continent	The Code Monkeys	Phoenix Games	Unreleased	2003	Unreleased		
Atlantis: The Lost Tales	Cryo Interactive	Cryo Interactive	Unreleased	October 1998	Unreleased		
Attack of the Saucerman	Psygnosis	Sony Computer Entertainment	Unreleased	June 1, 1999	Unreleased		
ATV Mania	Gotham Games	Take 2 Interactive	Unreleased	August 8, 2003	July 23, 2003		
ATV Racers	Miracle Designs	Mud Duck Productions ^{NA}, Midas Interactive Entertainment^{PAL}	Unreleased	June 13, 2003	June 20, 2003		
ATV: Quad Power Racing	Climax Studios	Acclaim, Acclaim Japan^{JP}	December 21, 2000	October 13, 2000	August 24, 2000		
AubirdForce	Bandai	Bandai	October 25, 1996	Unreleased	Unreleased		
AubirdForce After	Bandai	Bandai	October 22, 1998	Unreleased	Unreleased		
Aura Battler Dunbine	Bandai	Bandai	March 4, 2000	Unreleased	Unreleased		
Austin Powers Pinball	Gotham Games	Take 2 Interactive	Unreleased	October 25, 2002	October 10, 2002		
Autobahn Raser II	Davilex	Davilex	Unreleased	1998	Unreleased		
Auto Destruct	Neurostone	Electronic Arts	Unreleased	December 1997	December 26, 1997		
Ayakashi Ninden Kunoichiban	Zero System	Shoeisha	September 25, 1997	Unreleased	Unreleased		
Ayrton Senna Kart Duel	Gaps	Gaps^{JP}, Sunsoft^{PAL}	September 16, 1996	December 1996	Unreleased		
Ayrton Senna Kart Duel 2	Gaps	Gaps^{JP}, Sunsoft^{PAL}	November 20, 1997	January 15, 1997	Unreleased		
Ayrton Senna Kart Duel Special	Gaps	Gaps	April 28, 1999	Unreleased	Unreleased		
Azito	Astec 21	Banpresto	February 28, 1997	Unreleased	Unreleased		
Azito 2	Astec 21	Banpresto	October 15, 1998	Unreleased	Unreleased		
Azito 3	Astec 21	Banpresto	February 17, 2000	Unreleased	Unreleased		
Aztec: The Curse in the Heart of the City of Gold	Cryo Interactive	France Telecom Multimedia	Unreleased	June 1, 2000	Unreleased		
Azumanga Donjyara Daioh	Ganbarion	Bandai	April 18, 2002	Unreleased	Unreleased		
Azure Dreams	Konami	KCE Tokyo	November 13, 1997	December 1998	June 30, 1998		
B Senjou no Alice: Alice on Borderlines	Kodansha	Kodansha	September 18, 1997	Unreleased	Unreleased		
B.L.U.E. Legend of Water	CAProduction	Hudson Soft	July 9, 1998	Unreleased	Unreleased		
Baby Felix Tennis	Spark Entertainment	Light & Shadow Production	Unreleased	December 7, 2002	Unreleased		
Backgammon 2000	Oxford Softworks	Unbalance	May 18, 2000	Unreleased	Unreleased		
Backguiner ~Yomigaeru Yuushatachi~ "Guiner Tenshou"	Ving	Ving	July 30, 1998	Unreleased	Unreleased		
Backguiner ACT-2 ~Yomigaeru Yuushatachi~ Hishou Hen "Uragiri no Senjou"	Ving	Ving	October 1, 1998	Unreleased	Unreleased		
Backstreet Billiards	Agenda	Argent^{JP}, ASCII Entertainment^{NA}	July 30, 1998	Unreleased	October 1, 1998		
Backyard Soccer •Junior Sports Football^{PAL}	Runecraft	Infogrames	Unreleased	November 13, 2001	September 28, 2001		
Bakuretsu Hunter: Mahjong Special	Banpresto	Banpresto	October 25, 1996	Unreleased	Unreleased		
Bakuretsu Hunter: Sorezore no Omoi...Nowaan Chatte	Banpresto	Banpresto	April 11, 1997	Unreleased	Unreleased		
Bakushou!! All Yoshimoto Quiz Ou Ketteisen DX	Tose	Tose	December 15, 1995	Unreleased	Unreleased		
Bakusou Dekotora Densetsu: Otoko Ippiki Yume Kaidoi	Human Entertainment	Human Entertainment	June 25, 1998	Unreleased	Unreleased		
Bakusou Dekotora Densetsu 2: Otoko Jinsei Yume Ichiro	Spike	Spike	December 16, 1999	Unreleased	Unreleased		
(Mini Yonku)/Mini 4WD) Bakusou Kyoudai: Let's & Go!! WGP Hyper Heat	C-Lab	Jaleco Entertainment	November 20, 1997	Unreleased	Unreleased		
Bakusou Kyoudai: Let's & Go!! Eternal Wings	Jaleco Entertainment	Jaleco Entertainment	July 30, 1998	Unreleased	Unreleased		
Bakuten Shoot Beyblade 2002: Beybattle Tournament 2	Takara	Takara	August 1, 2002	Unreleased	Unreleased		
Baldies •Baldy Land^{JP}	Creative Edge Software	Banpresto^{JP}, Phoenix Games^{PAL}, Mud Duck Productions^{NA}	November 19, 1998	August 8, 2003	October 3, 2003		
Ball Breakers •Moho^{PAL}	Lost Toys	Take-Two Interactive	Unreleased	2000	July 27, 2000		
Ballblazer Champions	Factor 5	LucasArts	March 19, 1998	October 1997	March 10, 1997		
Ballerburg Castle Chaos	Ascaron Entertainment	Mud Duck Productions^{NA}, Phoenix Games^{PAL}	Unreleased	January 4, 2003	January 4, 2003		
Ballistic	Mitchell Corporation	THQ	Unreleased	October 20, 2000	November 4, 1999		
Barbapapa	SunSoft	SunSoft	October 4, 2001	Unreleased	Unreleased		
Barbie: Explorer	Runecraft	Vivendi Universal Interactive Publishing	Unreleased	April 9, 2001	April 9, 2001		
Barbie: Race & Ride	Runecraft	Mattel Media ^{NA}, Sony Computer Entertainment^{PAL}	Unreleased	November 9, 1999	November 18, 1999		
Barbie Super Sports	Runecraft	Mattel Media ^{NA}, Sony Computer Entertainment^{PAL}	Unreleased	April 20, 2000	January 6, 2000		
Barbie: Gotta Have Games	DICE Canada	Vivendi Universal Games	Unreleased	Unreleased	November 7, 2003		
Bardysh: Kromeford no Juunin	Infinity	Imadio	July 22, 1999	Unreleased	Unreleased		
Baroque	Sting Entertainment	Sting Entertainment	October 28, 1999	Unreleased	Unreleased		
Baroque Syndrome	Sting Entertainment	Sting Entertainment	July 27, 2000	Unreleased	Unreleased		
Baseball Navigator	Angel	Angel	July 31, 1997	Unreleased	Unreleased		
Baseball Simulation: ID Pro Yakyuu	Konami	Konami	January 25, 2001	Unreleased	Unreleased		
Bases Loaded '96: Double Header •Moero!! Pro Yakyuu '95: Double Header^{JP}	Jaleco Entertainment	Jaleco Entertainment	November 22, 1995	Unreleased	December 22, 1995		
Bass Fisherman	Sammy Studios	Sammy Studios	June 11, 1998	Unreleased	Unreleased		
Bass Landing	Tose	ASCII Entertainment, Agetec Inc.^{NA}	January 14, 1999	Unreleased	September 29, 1999		
Bass Landing 2	Tose	ASCII Entertainment	March 20, 2000	Unreleased	Unreleased		
Bass Rise	Bandai	Bandai	March 25, 1999	Unreleased	September 26, 1999		
Bass Tsuri ni Ikou! Let's Go Bassfishing!	Banpresto	Banpresto	April 22, 1999	Unreleased	Unreleased		
Bassing Beat 2	Hearty Robin	Hearty Robin	August 10, 2000	Unreleased	Unreleased		
Bastard!!	Opus	Seta Corporation	December 28, 1996	Unreleased	Unreleased		
Batman & Robin	Probe Entertainment	Acclaim Entertainment	Unreleased	August 5, 1998	January 7, 1998		
Batman Beyond: Return of the Joker^{NA} •Batman of the Future: Return of the Joker^{PAL}	Kemco	Ubi Soft	May 1, 2001	December 15, 2000	November 20, 2000		
Batman Forever: The Arcade Game	Iguana UK	Acclaim Entertainment	February 14, 1997	December 1996	December 3, 1996		
Batman: Gotham City Racer	Sinister Games	Ubi Soft	Unreleased	May 18, 2001	April 18, 2001		
Battle Arena Nitoshinden	Tamsoft	Takara	September 20, 1996	Unreleased	Unreleased		
Battle Arena Toshinden	Tamsoft	Sony Computer Entertainment	January 1, 1995	September 29, 1995	September 9, 1995	P	
Battle Arena Toshinden 2	Tamsoft	Takara and Toshiaki Ota	December 29, 1995	June 1996	May 23, 1996		
Battle Arena Toshinden 2 Plus (Note: update for Battle Arena Toshinden 2.)	Tamsoft	Takara	August 9, 1996	Unreleased	Unreleased		
Battle Arena Toshinden 3	Tamsoft	Takara	December 27, 1996	March 1997	June 26, 1997		
Battle Athletess: Daiundoukai Alternative	AIC Spirits	Increment-P	January 15, 1998	Unreleased	Unreleased		
Battle Athletess: Daiundoukai GTO	AIC Spirits	Increment-P	January 14, 1999	Unreleased	Unreleased		
Battle Bugs	Epyx	Manning	September 18, 1997	Unreleased	Unreleased		
Battle Formation	Banpresto	Banpresto	November 13, 1997	Unreleased	Unreleased		
Battle Hunter^{NA} •The Hunter^{PAL}	Success	Success ^{JP}, Agetec ^{NA}, Midas Interactive Entertainment^{PAL}	December 22, 1999	April 12, 2001	June 20, 2001		
Battle Konchuuden	Jaleco	Jaleco	January 21, 1999	Unreleased	Unreleased		
Battle Master	Taki	Taki	January 8, 1998	Unreleased	Unreleased		
Battle Qix	Success	Success	October 24, 2002	Unreleased	Unreleased		
BattleSport	Cyclone Studios	The 3DO Company	Unreleased	Unreleased	June 30, 1997		
Battle Stations	Electronic Arts	Realtime Associates	Unreleased	Unreleased	March 20, 1997		
BattleTanx: Global Assault	The 3DO Company	The 3DO Company	Unreleased	June 30, 2000	March 15, 2000		
Bealphareth	Zealsoft	SCEI	September 28, 2000	Unreleased	Unreleased		
Bear in the Big Blue House	DC Studios	Ubi Soft	Unreleased	December 13, 2002	December 12, 2002		
Beast Wars: Transformers	Sony Computer Entertainment Europe	Hasbro Interactive^{NA/PAL}, Takara ^{JP}	March 26, 1998	March 1, 1998	December 2, 1997		
Beatmania	Konami	Konami	October 1, 1998	Unreleased	Unreleased		
Beatmania (Europe)	Konami	Konami	Unreleased	June 2000	Unreleased		
Beatmania Append 3rd Mix (Note: expansion for the Beatmania series.)	Konami	Konami	December 23, 1998	Unreleased	Unreleased		
Beatmania Append 3rd Mix Mini (Note: expansion for the Beatmania series.)	Konami	Konami	October 29, 1998	Unreleased	Unreleased		
Beatmania Append 4th Mix (Note: expansion for the Beatmania series.)	Konami	Konami	September 9, 1999	Unreleased	Unreleased		
Beatmania Append 5th Mix (Note: expansion for the Beatmania series.)	Konami	Konami	March 2, 2000	Unreleased	Unreleased		
Beatmania Append Club mix (Note: expansion for the Beatmania series.)	Konami	Konami	December 21, 2000	Unreleased	Unreleased		
Beatmania Append Gottamix (Note: expansion for the Beatmania series.)	Konami	Konami	May 27, 1999	Unreleased	Unreleased		
Beatmania Append Gottamix 2 – Going Global (Note: expansion for the Beatmania series.)	Konami	Konami	September 7, 2000	Unreleased	Unreleased		
Beatmania Append Yebisu Mix (Note: expansion for the Beatmania series.)	Konami	Konami	December 9, 1999	Unreleased	Unreleased		
Beatmania 6th Mix + Core Mix	Konami	Konami	March 26, 2002	Unreleased	Unreleased		
Beatmania Featuring Dreams Come True	Konami	Konami	July 27, 2000	Unreleased	Unreleased		
Beatmania: The Sound of Tokyo	Konami	Konami	March 29, 2001	Unreleased	Unreleased		
Beat Planet Music	Opus	SCEI	January 20, 2000	Unreleased	Unreleased		
Beavis and Butt-Head in Virtual Stupidity	ICOM Simulations	Viacom New Media	January 29, 1998	Unreleased	Unreleased		
Bedlam	Mirage Technologies	GT Interactive	Unreleased	July 4, 1997	Unreleased		
Beyblade: Let it Rip! •Bakuten Shoot Beyblade^{JP}	WAVEDGE	Crave Entertainment^{NA}, Atari^{PAL}, Takara^{JP}	December 13, 2001	August 22, 2003	December 4, 2002		
Beyond the Beyond	Camelot Software Planning	Sony Computer Entertainment	November 3, 1995	Unreleased	August 31, 1996		
Big Air	The Pitbull Syndicate Limited	Accolade	Unreleased	April 1999	March 1, 1999		
Big Bass Fishing	Coresoft	Take 2 Interactive	Unreleased	April 24, 2002	May 6, 2002		
Big Bass World Championship •Super Black Bass X^{JP}	Starfish	Hot-B	August 7, 1997	Unreleased	March 15, 1997		
Big Challenge Golf: Tokyo Yomiuri Country Club Hen	Vap	Vap	March 14, 1997	Unreleased	Unreleased		
Big League Slugger Baseball •Baseball: Pro Nami Kusa Yakyuu!^{JP} •Wai Wai Kusa Yakyuu^{JP}	Now Production	Agetec Inc.^{NA}, Media Gallop^{JP}, Hamster Corporation^{JP}	December 7, 2000	Unreleased	July 8, 2003		
Big Ol' Bass 2 •Fisherman's Bait 3^{PAL} •Exciting Bass 3^{JP}	Konami Computer Entertainment Nagoya	Konami	January 25, 2001	March 9, 2001	November 10, 2000		
Big Strike Bowling	Coresoft	Take 2 Interactive	Unreleased	April 17, 2003	March 20, 2003		
Billiard (Selen)	ProSoft	Selen	July 12, 2001	Unreleased	Unreleased		
Bio F.R.E.A.K.S.	Saffire	Midway Games^{NA}, GT Interactive^{PAL}	Unreleased	September 1998	April 15, 1998		
Bishi Bashi Special	Konami	Konami	September 17, 1998	Unreleased	Unreleased		
Bishi Bashi Special 2	Konami	Konami	September 2, 1999	Unreleased	Unreleased		
Bishi Bashi Special 3: Step Champ	Konami	Konami	June 29, 2000	Unreleased	Unreleased		
Bishoujo Hanafuda Kikou: Michinoku Hitou Koimonogatari	Fog	Fog	August 7, 1997	Unreleased	Unreleased		
Bishoujo Senshi Sailor Moon SuperS Shin Shuyaku Soudatsusen	Angel	Angel	March 8, 1996	Unreleased	Unreleased		
Bishoujo Senshi Sailor Moon World – Chibi Usa to Tanoshii Mainichi	Bandai	Bandai	November 29, 2001	Unreleased	Unreleased		
The Bistro	Syscom	Syscom	February 17, 2000	Unreleased	Unreleased		
Black/Matrix 00	InterChannel	InterChannel	May 13, 2004	Unreleased	Unreleased		
Black/Matrix Cross	Flight-Plan	InterChannel	December 14, 2000	Unreleased	Unreleased		
Black Bass with Blue Marlin	Hot B	Starfish	Unreleased	Unreleased	November 18, 1999		
Black Dawn	Black Ops Entertainment	Virgin Interactive Entertainment	Unreleased	February 1997	October 24, 1996		
Black Jack vs. Matsuda Jun	Pony Canyon	Pony Canyon	August 10, 2000	Unreleased	Unreleased		
Blade	Hammerhead Ltd	Activision	Unreleased	December 15, 2000	November 28, 2000		
Blade Arts	Enix	Enix	September 28, 2000	Unreleased	Unreleased		
BladeMaker	Shoeisha	Shoeisha	July 1, 1999	Unreleased	Unreleased		
Blast Chamber	Attention to Detail	Activision	Unreleased	November 1996	October 22, 1996		
Blast Lacrosse	Sandbox Studios	Acclaim Sports	Unreleased	Unreleased	May 24, 2001		
Blast Radius	Pitbull Syndicate	Psygnosis	Unreleased	July 31, 1998	February 24, 1999		
Blaster Master: Blasting Again	Sunsoft	Crave Entertainment	July 31, 2000	September 2000	November 28, 2001		
Blasto	Sony Interactive Studios America	Sony Computer Entertainment	Unreleased	August 1, 1998	March 31, 1998		
Blaze and Blade Busters	GungHo	T&E Soft	September 23, 1998	Unreleased	Unreleased		
Blaze and Blade: Eternal Quest •Legend of Foresia : La Contrée interdite^{FR}	Technology and Entertainment Software	Funsoft	January 28, 1998	June 4, 1999	Unreleased		
Blazing Dragons	The Illusions Game Company	Crystal Dynamics	Unreleased	November 1996	October 3, 1996		
Blend X Brand	Tonkin House	Tonkin House	June 29, 2000	Unreleased	Unreleased		
Block Buster •Block Kuzushi 2^{JP} •"Simple 1500 Series Vol. 45: The Block Kuzushi 2"^{JP}	Tamsoft	Marvelous Entertainment ^{JP}, Phoenix Games^{PAL}	February 3, 2000	August 8, 2003	Unreleased		
Blockids	MonkeyPaw Games	Athena	February 23, 1996	2003	August 4, 2003		
Block & Switch	Serene	Serene	January 24, 2002	Unreleased	Unreleased		
Block Kuzushi Kowashite Help!	Now Production	Media Group	December 7, 2000	Unreleased	Unreleased		
Block Kuzushi: Deden no Gyakushuu	Island Creation	Island Creation	May 31, 1996	Unreleased	Unreleased		
Block Wars	Pony Canyon	Pony Canyon	September 6, 2001	Unreleased	Unreleased		
Blood Lines	Radical Entertainment	Sony Computer Entertainment	Unreleased	April 1999	Unreleased		
Blood Omen: Legacy of Kain	Silicon Knights	Crystal Dynamics	May 30, 1997	March 1997	November 14, 1996		
Bloody Roar	Hudson Soft	Hudson Soft ^{JP}, Sony Computer Entertainment ^{NA}, Virgin Interactive Entertainment^{PAL}	November 6, 1997	March 1998	January 2, 1998		
Bloody Roar 2	8ing/Raizing, Hudson Soft	Hudson Soft ^{JP}, Sony Computer Entertainment ^{NA}, Virgin Interactive Entertainment^{PAL}	January 28, 1999	July 1999	January 5, 1999		
Blue Breaker: Egao no yakusoku	Human Entertainment	Human Entertainment	December 25, 1997	Unreleased	Unreleased		
Blue Breaker Burst: Bishou o Anata to	Human Entertainment	Human Entertainment	July 23, 1998	Unreleased	Unreleased		
Blue Breaker Burst: Egao no Asuni	Human Entertainment	Human Entertainment	September 10, 1998	Unreleased	Unreleased		
Blue Forest Monogatari: Kaze no Fuuin	MBA International	Right Stuff	December 6, 1996	Unreleased	Unreleased		
The Blue Marlin	Hot-B	Starfish	May 2, 2000	Unreleased	Unreleased		
Blue's Clues: Blue's Big Musical	Terraglyph Interactive Studios	THQ	Unreleased	Unreleased	August 24, 2001		
Board Game Top Shop	KID	A1 Games	February 11, 1998	Unreleased	February 28, 2001		
Bob the Builder: Can We Fix It?	THQ	BBC Multimedia ^{PAL}, THQ^{NA}	Unreleased	January 12, 2000	December 1, 2000		
Bogey Dead 6 •Raging Skies^{PAL}	Asmik Ace Entertainment	Sony Computer Entertainment	January 26, 1996	September 1996	July 8, 1996		
Bokan Go Go Go	Banpresto	Banpresto	February 22, 2001	Unreleased	Unreleased		
Boku no Choro-Q	Takara	Takara	March 7, 2002	Unreleased	Unreleased		
Boku no Natsuyasumi	Millennium Kitchen	Sony Computer Entertainment	June 22, 2000	Unreleased	Unreleased		
Boku wa Koukuu Kanseikan	Syscom	Syscom	December 22, 1999	Unreleased	Unreleased		
Bokujo Monogatari Harvest Moon For Girl (Note: update for Harvest Moon: Back To Nature.)	Victor Interactive Software	Victor Interactive Software	December 7, 2000	Unreleased	Unreleased		
Bokujyoukeieteki Board Game: Umapoly	Konami	Konami	December 25, 1999	Unreleased	Unreleased		
Bokurato Asobou! Ultraman TV	Bandai	Bandai	September 21, 2000	Unreleased	Unreleased		
Bomb Boat	Success	Success	August 29, 2002	Unreleased	Unreleased		
Bomberman Fantasy Race	Graphic Research Co. Ltd	Virgin Interactive Entertainment	August 6, 1998	July 2000	March 31, 1999		
Bomberman Land	Hudson Soft	Hudson Soft	December 21, 2000	Unreleased	Unreleased		
Bomberman Party Edition •Bomberman^{PAL}	Metro	Hudson Soft ^{JP}, Vatical Entertainment ^{NA}, Virgin Interactive Entertainment^{PAL}	December 10, 1998	July 1999	September 19, 2000		
Bomberman Wars	Hudson Soft	Hudson Soft	April 16, 1998	Unreleased	Unreleased		
Bomberman World	Hudson Soft	Atlus	January 29, 1998	August 1998	January 30, 1998		
The Bombing Islands	Kotobuki Systems	Kemco	July 18, 1997	1998	May 2, 2001		
Bonogurashi: Kore de Kanpeki Disu	Amuse	Amuse	June 7, 1996	Unreleased	Unreleased		
Boundary Gate: Daughter of Kingdom	Victor Interactive Software	Victor Interactive Software	July 17, 1997	Unreleased	Unreleased		
Bounty Sword First	Pioneer LDC	Pioneer LDC	June 6, 1997	Unreleased	Unreleased		
Bounty Sword: Double Edge	Pioneer LDC	Pioneer LDC	July 30, 1998	Unreleased	Unreleased		
The Book of Watermarks	ARC Entertainment	Sony Computer Entertainment	July 15, 1999	Unreleased	Unreleased		
BoomBots	The Neverhood	SouthPeak Interactive	Unreleased	Unreleased	January 11, 1999		
Bottom of the 9th	Konami	Konami	October 25, 1996	Unreleased	April 4, 1996		
Bottom of the 9th '97 •Jikkyou American Baseball^{JP}	Konami	Konami	May 14, 1998	Unreleased	July 10, 1997		
Bottom of the 9th '99	Konami	Konami	Unreleased	Unreleased	August 31, 1998		
Bounty Hunter Sara: Holy Mountain no Teiou	Flagship	Capcom	May 24, 2001	Unreleased	Unreleased		
Boxer's Road	New	New	September 8, 1995	Unreleased	Unreleased		
Boys Be... Kono Koi no Yukue	Axes Art Amuse	Kodansha	March 28, 1997	Unreleased	Unreleased		
Boys Be... Second Season	Kodansha	Kodansha	September 22, 1999	Unreleased	Unreleased		
BRAHMA Force: The Assault on Beltlogger 9	Genki	Genki^{JP}, JVC Music Europe^{EU}	November 15, 1996	March 1998	March 31, 1997		
Brain Dead 13	ReadySoft	ReadySoft^{NA}, Coconuts Japan^{JP}	October 18, 1996	Unreleased	March 6, 1996		
Bratz	DC Studios	Ubi Soft	Unreleased	May 2, 2003	March 13, 2003		
Brave Fencer Musashi •Brave Fencer Musashiden^{JP}	Square	Square ^{JP}, Square Electronic Arts ^{NA}	July 16, 1998	Unreleased	November 12, 1998		
Brave Prove	DataWest	DataWest	April 15, 1998	Unreleased	Unreleased		
Brave Saga 2	Takara	Takara	May 2, 2000	Unreleased	Unreleased		
Brave Sword	Sammy Studios	Sammy Studios	October 19, 2000	Unreleased	Unreleased		
Bravo Air Race •Recipro Heat 5000^{JP} •Air Race^{PAL}	Xing Entertainment	THQ	July 31, 1997	December 1997	January 10, 1997		
Break Volley •Simple 1500 Series Vol. 54: The Volleyball - Break Volley Plus^{JP}	Art Co., Ltd.	Aqua Rouge	November 2, 1999	Unreleased	Unreleased		
Breakout	Supersonic Software	Hasbro Interactive	Unreleased	October 6, 2000	September 23, 2000		
Break Point	Smart Dog	Ocean Software^{PAL}, Konami^{JP}	September 18, 1997	December 1996	Unreleased		
BreakThru!	Shoeisha	Shoeisha	December 1, 1995	Unreleased	Unreleased		
Breath of Fire III	Capcom	Capcom ^{JP/NA}, Infogrames^{PAL}	September 11, 1997	October 8, 1998	April 30, 1998		
Breath of Fire IV	Capcom	Capcom	April 27, 2000	August 3, 2001	November 30, 2000		
Breed Master	Office Create	Office Create	April 25, 2002	Unreleased	Unreleased		
Breeding Stud: Bokujou de Aimashou	Konami	Konami	March 27, 1997	Unreleased	Unreleased		
Breeding Stud 2	Konami	Konami	July 30, 1998	Unreleased	Unreleased		
Breeding Stud '99	Konami	Konami	November 11, 1999	Unreleased	Unreleased		
Brian Lara Cricket •Shane Warne Cricket^{AU,NZ}	Codemasters	Codemasters	Unreleased	December 8, 1998^{PAL,AU,NZ}	Unreleased		
Brigandine: Legend of Forsena	Hearty Robin	Hearty Robin^{JP}, Atlus^{NA}	April 2, 1998	Unreleased	January 11, 1998		
Brigandine Grand Edition (Note: update for Brigandine: Legend of Forsena.)	Hearty Robin	Hearty Robin	May 18, 2000	Unreleased	Unreleased		
Brightis	Shade	SCEI	October 14, 1999	Unreleased	Unreleased		
Broken Helix	Konami	Konami	March 26, 1998	February 1998	May 31, 1997		
Broken Sword: The Shadow of the Templars •Baphomets Fluch^{DE} •Les Chevaliers de Baphomet^{FR}	Revolution Software	THQ^{NA}, Sony Computer Entertainment^{PAL}	Unreleased	December 1996	January 31, 1998		
Broken Sword II: The Smoking Mirror •Baphomets Fluch 2: Die Spiegel der Finsternis^{DE} •Les Boucliers de Quetzalcoatl: Les Chevaliers de Baphomet II^{FR} •Broken Sword II: La Profezia dei Maya^{IT}	Revolution Software	Sony Computer Entertainment^{PAL}, Crave Entertainment ^{NA}	Unreleased	November 14, 1997	November 30, 1999		
Brunswick Circuit Pro Bowling	Adrenalin Entertainment	THQ	Unreleased	November 1998	September 30, 1998		
Brunswick Circuit Pro Bowling 2	Adrenalin Entertainment	THQ	Unreleased	March 2000	February 10, 2000		
Bubble Bobble also featuring Rainbow Islands	Probe Entertainment	Acclaim Entertainment	Unreleased	October 1996	September 6, 1996		
Bubsy 3D	Eidetic Inc	Accolade	Unreleased	August 1997	November 26, 1996		
Buckle Up!	Shangri-La	Shangri-La	January 29, 1998	Unreleased	Unreleased		
Bug Riders	GT Interactive	n-Space	Unreleased	1998	January 11, 1997		
A Bug's Life	Traveller's Tales	Sony Computer Entertainment ^{NA/PAL}, Konami^{JP}	February 1999	October 28, 1998	November 18, 1998	P	
A Bug's Life Activity Centre	Disney Interactive Studios	Sony Computer Entertainment	Unreleased	December 1, 1999	Unreleased		
Bugs Bunny: Lost in Time	Behaviour Interactive	Infogrames	Unreleased	June 29, 1999	June 15, 1999		
Bugs Bunny & Taz: Time Busters	Artificial Mind & Movement	Infogrames	Unreleased	November 24, 2000	December 29, 2000		
Builder's Block •Land Maker^{JP,PAL}	Taito	Jaleco	December 9, 1999	September 30, 2000	December 7, 2000		
Building Crush!	Shoeisha	Shoeisha	October 25, 1999	Unreleased	Unreleased		
Burger Burger	Rytmix	Gaps	November 27, 1997	Unreleased	Unreleased		
Burger Burger 2	Biox	Gaps	July 15, 1999	Unreleased	Unreleased		
Burning Road	Toka^{JP}	Funsoft	January 31, 1997	November 15, 1996	September 30, 1996		
Burstrick Wake Boarding!! •Simple 1500 Series Vol. 83: The Wake Board - Burstrick Wake Boarding^{JP}	Metro	Metro^{JP}, JVC Music Europe^{PAL}, Natsume Inc.^{NA}	July 6, 2000	February 28, 2001	February 28, 2001		
Bushido Blade	Square	Square ^{JP}, Sony Computer Entertainment^{NA/PAL}	March 14, 1997	February 1, 1998	October 1, 1997		
Bushido Blade 2	Square, Light Weight	Square ^{JP}, Square Electronic Arts^{NA}	March 19, 1998	Unreleased	October 1, 1998		
Bust a Groove •Bust a Move^{JP}	Metro Graphics	Enix ^{JP}, 989 Studios ^{NA}, Sony Computer Entertainment^{PAL}	January 29, 1998	November 25, 1998	November 15, 1998		
Bust a Groove 2 •Bust a Move 2^{JP}	Metro Graphics	Enix	April 15, 1999	Unreleased	March 31, 1999		
Bust-A-Move 2: Arcade Edition •Puzzle Bobble 2^{JP}	Taito	Taito ^{JP}, Acclaim Entertainment^{WW}	March 29, 1996	August 1996	June 1996	P	
Bust-A-Move 3 DX^{PAL} •Bust-A-Move '99^{NA} •Puzzle Bobble 3 DX^{JP}	Taito	Taito ^{JP}, Acclaim Entertainment^{WW}	November 6, 1997	February 27, 1998	March 1, 1999		
Bust-A-Move 4 •Puzzle Bobble 4^{JP} •Simple 1500 Series Vol. 93: The Puzzle Bobble - Puzzle Bobble 4^{JP}	Taito	Taito ^{JP}, Natsume Inc.^{NA}, Acclaim Entertainment^{PAL}	August 6, 1998	April 15, 1999	October 31, 1998		
Buster Bros. Collection •Super Pang Collection^{JP,PAL}	Mitchell Corporation	Capcom	March 14, 1997	June 1998	May 20, 1997		
Butagee de Iin Janai?	Shangri-La	Shangri-La	February 26, 1998	Unreleased	Unreleased		
Buttsubushi	Phoenix Games^{PAL}, Selen^{JP}	Phoenix Games^{PAL}, Selen^{JP}	March 15, 2001	August 13, 2004	Unreleased		
Buzz Lightyear of Star Command •Les Aventures de Buzz l'éclair^{FR}	Traveller's Tales	Activision	Unreleased	February 2, 2001	October 11, 2000		
C-12: Final Resistance	Sony Computer Entertainment Europe	Sony Computer Entertainment	Unreleased	April 6, 2001	July 22, 2002	P	
C1 Circuit	Invex	Invex	October 4, 1996	Unreleased	Unreleased		
C3 Racing •Max Power Racing	Eutechnyx	Infogrames	Unreleased	1998	Unreleased		
C: The Contra Adventure	Appaloosa Interactive	Konami	Unreleased	Unreleased	September 1, 1998		
Cabela's Big Game Hunter: Ultimate Challenge	Coresoft	Activision	Unreleased	Unreleased	December 4, 2001		
Cabela's Ultimate Deer Hunt: Open Season	Coresoft	Activision	Unreleased	Unreleased	October 30, 2002		
Cadillac	Hect	Hect	May 27, 1999	Unreleased	Unreleased		
Caesars Palace	Interplay	Interplay	Unreleased	January 1998	August 28, 1997		
Caesar's Palace 2000	Runecraft	Interplay Entertainment	Unreleased	June 16, 2000	June 29, 2000		
Caesar's Palace II	Runecraft	Interplay Entertainment	Unreleased	Unreleased	October 15, 1998		
Calamity Adventure 1: The Natural World	Lightspan	Lightspan	Unreleased	Unreleased	1997		
Calamity Adventure 2: People and Traditions	Lightspan	Lightspan	Unreleased	Unreleased	1997		
Calamity Adventure 3: Around the World	Lightspan	Lightspan	Unreleased	Unreleased	1997		
Calcolo!	Clef	Clef	November 6, 1997	Unreleased	Unreleased		
California Surfing	Midas Interactive	Midas Interactive	Unreleased	December 13, 2001	Unreleased		
California Watersports	Theyer GFX	Midas Interactive	Unreleased	March 30, 2001	Unreleased		
Cali's Geo Tools	Lightspan	Lightspan	Unreleased	Unreleased	1997		
Capcom Generation 1: Dai 1 Shuu Gekitsuiou no Jidai	Capcom	Capcom	August 27, 1998	Unreleased	Unreleased		
Capcom Generation 2: Dai 2 Shuu Makai to Kishi	Capcom	Capcom	September 23, 1998	Unreleased	Unreleased		
Capcom Generation 3: Dai 3 Shuu Koko ni Rekishi Hajimaru	Capcom	Capcom	October 15, 1998	Unreleased	Unreleased		
Capcom Generation 4: Dai 4 Shuu Kokou no Eiyuu	Capcom	Capcom	November 12, 1998	Unreleased	Unreleased		
Capcom VS SNK: Pro	Capcom	Capcom	April 18, 2002	July 12, 2002	August 14, 2002		
Captain Commando	NEW Corporation	Capcom	September 17, 1998	Unreleased	Unreleased		
Captain Love!!	Rit's	Toshiba EMI	March 11, 1999	Unreleased	Unreleased		
Captain Tsubasa: Aratanaru Densetsu Joshou	WinkySoft	Konami	May 16, 2002	Unreleased	Unreleased		
Captain Tsubasa J: Get In The Tomorrow	Bandai	Bandai	May 3, 1996	Unreleased	Unreleased		
Car & Driver Presents: Grand Tour Racing '98 •Total Drivin^{PAL} •M6 Turbo Racing^{FR}	Eutechnyx	Activision^{NA}, Ocean Software^{PAL}, Atlus^{JP}	April 23, 1998	October 15, 1997	September 30, 1997		
Card Games •Simple 1500 Series Vol. 44: The Card 2^{JP}	Amedio	^{JP} D3 Publisher, ^{NA} Agetec Inc.	October 26, 2000	Unreleased	August 28, 2001		
Card II	Success	Success	September 22, 1999	Unreleased	Unreleased		
Cardcaptor Sakura: Clow Card Magic	Arika	Arika	January 27, 2000	Unreleased	Unreleased		
Cardinal Syn	Kronos Digital Entertainment	Sony Computer Entertainment	Unreleased	June 1998	January 8, 1998		
Carmageddon	Aqua Pacific	Sales Curve Interactive	Unreleased	October 1, 1999	Unreleased		
Carnage Heart	Artdink	Sony Computer Entertainment^{NA/PAL}, Artdink^{JP}	December 8, 1995	May 1997	January 10, 1997		
Carnage Heart EZ: Easy Zapping (Note: update for Carnage Heart.)	Artdink	Artdink	July 24, 1997	Unreleased	Unreleased		
Carom Shot	Agenda	Argent	April 25, 1997	Unreleased	Unreleased		
CART World Series	Sony Computer Entertainment	Sony Computer Entertainment	Unreleased	March 28, 1998	September 16, 1997		
Casper	Funcom	Interplay Productions	Unreleased	October 1996	September 27, 1996		
Casper - Friends Around the World	Realtime Associates	Sound Source Interactive ^{NA}, TDK Mediactive^{PAL}	Unreleased	December 15, 2000	November 14, 2000		
Castlevania Chronicles •Castlevania Chronicle: Akumajou Dracula^{JP}	Konami Digital Entertainment	Konami	May 24, 2001	November 9, 2001	October 9, 2001		
Castlevania: Symphony of the Night •Akumajou Dracula X: Nocturne in the Moonlight^{JP}	Konami	Konami	March 20, 1997	November 1, 1997	October 15, 1997		
Castrol Honda Superbike Racing	Interactive Entertainment	^{NA} Electronic Arts, ^{PAL} THQ, ^{JP} Success	May 25, 2000	October 13, 2000	April 30, 1999		
Castrol Honda VTR	Interactive Entertainment	Midas Interactive^{PAL}, Success^{JP}	October 25, 2001	February 9, 2001	Unreleased		
Catan - Die erste Insel (German)	Similis	Ravensburger Interactive Media	Unreleased	March 2001	Unreleased		
The Cat in the Hat	DC Studios	NewKidCo	Unreleased	Unreleased	April 23, 2004		
Cat the Ripper: Jyusanninme no Tanteishi	Tonkin House	Tonkin House	July 17, 1997	Unreleased	Unreleased		
Catch! Kimochi Sensation	Pandora Box	Pandora Box	August 10, 2000	Unreleased	Unreleased		
Celebrity Deathmatch	Big Ape Productions	Gotham Games	Unreleased	2003	October 21, 2003		
Centipede	Leaping Lizard Software, Real Sports Games	Hasbro Interactive	Unreleased	November 22, 1999	June 1, 1999		
Champion Wrestler: Jikkyou Live	Taito	Taito	February 16, 1996	Unreleased	Unreleased		
CG Mukashi Banashi: Jiisan 2-do Bikkuri!!	Axes Art Amuse	Idea Factory	March 8, 1996	Unreleased	Unreleased		
Championship Bass	EA Seattle	Electronic Arts	Unreleased	March 31, 2000	March 7, 2000		
Championship Manager Quiz	King of the Jungle	Eidos Interactive	Unreleased	November 30, 2001	Unreleased		
Championship Motocross featuring Ricky Carmichael	Funcom Dublin	THQ	Unreleased	July 31, 1999	September 13, 1999		
Championship Motocross 2001 featuring Ricky Carmichael	Funcom Dublin	THQ	Unreleased	April 6, 2001	February 1, 2001		
Championship Surfer	Krome Studios	Mattel Interactive ^{NA}, GAME Studios^{PAL}	Unreleased	October 19, 2001	December 2, 2000		
Chaos Break	Taito	Taito^{JP}, Eon Digital Entertainment^{PAL}	January 27, 2000	December 8, 2000	Unreleased		
Chaos Control	Infogrames Multimedia	Virgin Interactive Entertainment	October 4, 1996	Unreleased	Unreleased		
Charumera	Bits Laboratory	Victor Interactive Software	November 25, 1999	Unreleased	Unreleased		
Checkmate •Checkmate II^{EU}	Altron	Midas Interactive^{PAL}, Altron^{JP}	June 18, 1998	April 12, 2001	Unreleased		
Cheesy	CTA Developments	Ocean Software^{PAL}, Jaleco^{JP}	July 24, 1997	November 15, 1996	Unreleased		
Chess	Success	A1 Games^{NA}, Success^{JP}	November 29, 2001	Unreleased	November 29, 2001		
Chess & Reversi	Yuki	DigiCube	January 24, 2002	Unreleased	Unreleased		
Chess 2000	Oxford Softworks	Unbalance	April 6, 2000	Unreleased	Unreleased		
Chessmaster II	Starsphere Interactive	Mindscape	Unreleased	October 15, 1999	September 27, 1999		
The Chessmaster 3-D •The Chessmaster^{JP}	Mindscape, Altron	Mindscape	November 1, 1996	July 1996	January 17, 1996		
Chibi Maruko-Chan: Maruko Enikki World	KID	Takara	December 22, 1995	Unreleased	Unreleased		
Chibi-Chara Game Gingaeiyu Densetsu	Tokuma Shoten	Tokuma Shoten	May 27, 1999	Unreleased	Unreleased		
Chicken Run	Blitz Games	Eidos Interactive	Unreleased	November 24, 2000	November 1, 2000		
Chiisana Kyojin Microman	Wavedge	Takara	March 11, 1999	Unreleased	Unreleased		
Chiisana Oukoku Eltoria	KSS	KSS	June 29, 2000	Unreleased	Unreleased		
Chill	Silicon Dreams Studio	Eidos Interactive	Unreleased	April 1998	Unreleased		
China: The Forbidden City	Cryo Interactive	Cryo Interactive, Canal+ Multimedia, Réunion des Musées Nationaux	Unreleased	1999	Unreleased		
Chinmoku no Kantai	Opera House	Kodansha	September 28, 2000	Unreleased	Unreleased		
Chō Aniki: Kyūkyoku Muteki Ginga Saikyō Otoko	Pre-Stage	Masaya	December 29, 1995	Unreleased	Unreleased		
Cho-Nazo-Oh	Bandai	Bandai Visual	January 27, 2000	Unreleased	Unreleased		
Chocobo Collection	Square, ParityBit, Denyusha Co.	Square	December 22, 1999	Unreleased	Unreleased		
Chocobo Racing	Square	Square ^{JP/PAL}, Square Electronic Arts ^{NA}	March 18, 1999	October 11, 1999	August 10, 1999		
Chocobo's Dungeon 2^{NA} •Chokobo no Fushigi na Danjon 2^{JP}	Square	Square ^{JP/PAL}, Square Electronic Arts ^{NA}	December 23, 1998	Unreleased	January 1, 2000		
Chocobo no Fushigi na Dungeon	Square	Square	December 23, 1997	Unreleased	Unreleased		
Chocobo Stallion	Square	Square	December 22, 1999	Unreleased	Unreleased		
Chocolate Kiss	Infinity	DigiCube	February 14, 2002	Unreleased	Unreleased		
Choro Q •Penny Racers^{PAL}	Tamsoft	Takara^{JP}, Sony Computer Entertainment^{PAL}	March 22, 1996	October 6, 1996	Unreleased		
Choro Q 2	Takara	Takara	February 21, 1997	Unreleased	Unreleased		
Choro Q 3	Takara	Takara	February 19, 1998	Unreleased	Unreleased		
Choro Q Jet: Rainbow Wings	C-Lab	Takara	February 26, 1998	Unreleased	Unreleased		
Choro Q Marine: Q-Boat	Takara	Takara	June 25, 1998	Unreleased	Unreleased		
Choro Q Wonderful!	Takara	Takara	August 5, 1999	Unreleased	Unreleased		
Chō Hatsumei Boy Kanipan: Hirameki☆Wonderland	Quintet	Taito	September 30, 1999	Unreleased	Unreleased		
Chou Jiryoku Senshi Microman: Generation 2000	Barnhouse Effect	Takara	December 16, 1999	Unreleased	Unreleased		
Chou Mashin Eiyuuden Wataru: Another Step	Aspect	Banpresto	April 23, 1998	Unreleased	Unreleased		
Chou Sentou Kyuugi Vanborg	Avit	Hect	February 18, 1999	Unreleased	Unreleased		
Chou-Kousoku GranDoll	Emotion Digital Software	Bandai	July 24, 1997	Unreleased	Unreleased		
Choujin Gakuen Gowcaizer	Urban Plant	Urban Plant	July 17, 1997	Unreleased	Unreleased		
Chris Kamara's Street Soccer	Pixel Storm	Midas Interactive Entertainment	Unreleased	August 25, 2000, September 1, 2000	Unreleased		
Chronicles of the Sword	Synthetic Dimensions	Psygnosis	Unreleased	1996	November 27, 1996		
Chrono Cross	Square	Square^{JP}, Square Electronic Arts^{NA}	November 18, 1999	Unreleased	August 15, 2000		
Chrono Trigger	Tose	Square ^{JP}, Square Electronic Arts ^{NA}	November 2, 1999	Unreleased	June 21, 2001		
Chuushingura	Toei	Toei	January 29, 1998	Unreleased	Unreleased		
Cindy's Caribbean Holiday	Ivolgamus	Phoenix Games	Unreleased	January 2003	Unreleased		
Cindy's Fashion World	Ivolgamus	Phoenix Games	Unreleased	January 2003	Unreleased		
Circadia	Alvion	Sony Computer Entertainment	January 14, 1999	Unreleased	Unreleased		
Circuit Beat	Prism Arts	Prism Arts	May 17, 1996	Unreleased	Unreleased		
Circuit Breakers	Supersonic Software	Mindscape	Unreleased	July 1998	July 31, 1998		
City Bravo!	Altron	Altron	January 10, 1997	Unreleased	Unreleased		
City Bravo! Business Hen	Altron	Altron	July 27, 2000	Unreleased	Unreleased		
The City of Lost Children	Psygnosis	Psygnosis	Unreleased	June 1997	May 31, 1997		
Civilization	Microprose	Asmik Ace Entertainment, Inc	April 26, 1996	Unreleased	Unreleased		
Civilization II	Alpha Unit	Human Entertainment^{JP}, Activision^{PAL,NA}	December 23, 1998	April 1, 1999	January 4, 1999		
Civizard: Majutsu no Keifu	Opera House	Asmik Ace Entertainment, Inc	January 17, 1997	Unreleased	Unreleased		
Classic Road	Victor Interactive Software	Victor Interactive Software	December 15, 1995	Unreleased	Unreleased		
Classic Road 2	Victor Interactive Software	Victor Interactive Software	April 1, 1999	Unreleased	Unreleased		
Classic Road Yuushun 2	Victor Interactive Software	Victor Interactive Software	April 2, 1998	Unreleased	Unreleased		
Cleopatra's Fortune	Altron	Midas Interactive	May 17, 2001	February 7, 2003	May 16, 2003		
Click Manga: Click no Hi (Note: Contains playable jigsaw and sliding puzzles, and a scored whack-a-mole-style submarine mini-game.)	Tokuma Shoten	Tokuma Shoten	October 28, 1999	Unreleased	Unreleased		
Click Medic	Game Freak	Sony Music Entertainment Japan	January 28, 1999	Unreleased	Unreleased		
Clock Tower	Human Entertainment	ASCII Entertainment	December 13, 1996	February 1998	January 10, 1997		
Clock Tower: The First Fear	Human Entertainment	ASCII Entertainment	July 17, 1997	Unreleased	Unreleased		
Clock Tower II: The Struggle Within	Human Entertainment	Human Entertainment, Agetec	March 12, 1998	Unreleased	November 2, 1999		
ClockWerx	Axes Art Amuse	Tokuma Shoten	July 26, 1996	Unreleased	Unreleased		
Cocktail Harmony •Cocktail no Recipe^{JP}	Astroll	Astroll	September 10, 1998	Unreleased	Unreleased		
Codename: Tenka •Lifeforce Tenka^{PAL}	Psygnosis	Sony Computer Entertainment^{NA}, Psygnosis^{PAL}	Unreleased	July 1997	May 31, 1997		
Colin McRae Rally	Codemasters	Codemasters	Unreleased	July 15, 1998	March 1, 2000	P	
Colin McRae Rally 2.0	Codemasters	Codemasters	Unreleased	September 6, 2000	December 5, 2000	P	
College Slam	Iguana Entertainment	Acclaim Entertainment	Unreleased	Unreleased	February 10, 1996		
Colony Wars	Psygnosis	Psygnosis	Unreleased	November 5, 1997	October 31, 1997		
Colony Wars: Red Sun	Psygnosis	Sony Computer Entertainment^{PAL}, Midway Games^{NA}	Unreleased	May 2, 2000	April 12, 2000		
Colony Wars: Vengeance	Psygnosis	Psygnosis	Unreleased	November 13, 1998	October 15, 1998		
Combi Mahjong Awaseuchi with Maboroshi Tsukiyo Characters	Gaps	Gaps	June 1, 2000	Unreleased	Unreleased		
Covert Ops: Nuclear Dawn •Chase the Express^{JP}	Sugar & Rockets Inc., Tyo Entertainment	Sony Computer Entertainment^{JP/PAL}, Activision^{NA}	January 27, 2000	September 8, 2000	May 31, 2000	P	
Combat Choro Q	Barnhouse Effect	Takara	February 25, 1999	Unreleased	Unreleased		
Colorful Logic	Altron	Altron	June 22, 2000	Unreleased	Unreleased		
Colorful Logic 2	Altron	Altron	January 18, 2001	Unreleased	Unreleased		
Colorful Logic 3	Altron	Altron	July 12, 2001	Unreleased	Unreleased		
Combination Pro Soccer	Kuusoukagaku	Axela	June 18, 1998	Unreleased	Unreleased		
Command & Conquer	Westwood Studios	Virgin Interactive Entertainment	Unreleased	December 1996	March 10, 1997	P	
Command & Conquer: Red Alert	Westwood Studios	Virgin Interactive Entertainment	April 16, 1998	November 1997	October 15, 1997	P	
Command & Conquer Red Alert: Retaliation (Note: stand-alone expansion for Command & Conquer: Red Alert.)	Westwood Studios	Virgin Interactive Entertainment	Unreleased	September 1998	August 28, 1998		
Community Pom	Fill-in-Cafe	Fill-in-Cafe	October 30, 1997	Unreleased	Unreleased		
Community Pom: Omoide o Dakishimete	Family Soft	Family Soft	June 24, 1999	Unreleased	Unreleased		
Complete Onside Soccer •Zinedine Zidane Football^{FR}	MotiveTime	Telstar^{PAL}, Ichikawa^{JP}	January 29, 1998	June 1996	Unreleased		
Constructor	System 3	Acclaim Entertainment	Unreleased	1998	Unreleased		
Contender •Victory Boxing 2^{PAL} •Dynamite Boxing^{JP}	Victor Interactive Software	Victor Interactive Software ^{JP}, Sony Computer Entertainment ^{NA}, JVC Music Europe^{PAL}	May 21, 1998	October 1998	January 13, 1999		
Contender 2 •Victory Boxing Contender^{PAL} •Funky Boxers^{JP}	Victor Interactive Software	Victor Interactive Software ^{JP}, BAM! Entertainment ^{NA}, JVC Music Europe^{PAL}	November 28, 2002	October 12, 2000	December 19, 2000		
Contra: Legacy of War	Appaloosa Interactive	Konami	Unreleased	March 30, 1997	November 29, 1996		
The Conveni	Masterpiece	Human Entertainment	March 28, 1997	Unreleased	Unreleased		
The Conveni 2	Masterpiece	Human Entertainment	December 18, 1997	Unreleased	Unreleased		
The Conveni Special	Masterpiece	Artdink	March 12, 1998	Unreleased	Unreleased		
Cool Boarders	UEP Systems	UEP Systems ^{JP}, Sony Computer Entertainment ^{NA/PAL}	August 30, 1996	January 9, 1997	December 31, 1996		
Cool Boarders 2	UEP Systems	UEP Systems ^{JP}, Sony Computer Entertainment ^{NA/PAL}	August 28, 1997	February 1, 1998	November 11, 1997	P	
Cool Boarders 3	Idol Minds	UEP Systems ^{JP}, 989 Studios^{NA}, Sony Computer Entertainment ^{PAL}	November 28, 1998	November 15, 1998	October 30, 1998	P	
Cool Boarders 4	Idol Minds	UEP Systems ^{JP}, 989 Studios^{NA}, Sony Computer Entertainment ^{PAL}	March 9, 2000	February 25, 2000	October 26, 1999	P	
Cool Boarders 2001	Idol Minds	Sony Computer Entertainment	Unreleased	Unreleased	October 23, 2000		
Cosmic Cookoff: Language Arts	Lightspan	Lightspan	Unreleased	Unreleased	1998		
Cosmic Cookoff: Mathematics	Lightspan	Lightspan	Unreleased	Unreleased	1998		
Cosmic Race	Neorex	Neorex	January 20, 1995	Unreleased	Unreleased		
Cosmowarrior Zero	Taito	Taito	May 18, 2000	Unreleased	Unreleased		
Cotton 100%	Success	Success	March 27, 2003	Unreleased	Unreleased		
Cotton Original	Success	Success	April 28, 1999	Unreleased	Unreleased		
Countdown Vampires	K2 LLC	Bandai	December 22, 1999	Unreleased	January 8, 2000		
Courier Crisis	New Level Software	GT Interactive	Unreleased	November 1997	November 30, 1997		
Cowboy Bebop	Bandai	Bandai	May 14, 1998	Unreleased	Unreleased		
Cranky Pro	Syscom	Syscom	October 2, 1997	Unreleased	Unreleased		
Crash Bandicoot	Naughty Dog	Sony Computer Entertainment	December 6, 1996	November 8, 1996	September 9, 1996	P	
Crash Bandicoot 2: Cortex Strikes Back	Naughty Dog	Sony Computer Entertainment	December 18, 1997	December 6, 1997	October 15, 1997	P	
Crash Bandicoot: Warped	Naughty Dog	Sony Computer Entertainment	December 17, 1998	December 5, 1998	November 15, 1998	P	
Crash Team Racing	Naughty Dog	Sony Computer Entertainment	December 16, 1999	October 20, 1999	October 1, 1999	P	
Crash Bash	Eurocom	Sony Computer Entertainment	December 14, 2000	December 1, 2000	November 10, 2000	P	
Crayon Shin-chan	Bandai	Bandai	November 29, 2001	Unreleased	Unreleased		
Crazy Balloon 2000	Success	Success	October 26, 2000	Unreleased	Unreleased		
Crazy Climber 2000	ISCO	Nichibutsu	February 3, 2000	Unreleased	Unreleased		
Creatures	Creature Labs	Swing Entertainment	Unreleased	Unreleased	May 18, 2002		
Creatures 3: Raised in Space	Elo Interactive	Play It	Unreleased	January 30, 2003	May 14, 2003		
Creature Shock	Interactive Studios	Data East	August 23, 1996	Unreleased	Unreleased		
Cricket 2000	Krisalis Software	Electronic Arts	Unreleased	March 2000	Unreleased		
Crime Crackers	Media.Vision	SCEI	December 3, 1994	Unreleased	Unreleased		
Crime Crackers 2	Media.Vision	SCEI	November 27, 1997	Unreleased	Unreleased		
Crime Killer	Pixelogic	Interplay Entertainment	Unreleased	June 26, 1998	June 30, 1998		
Crisis Beat	Soft Machine	Studio 3^{PAL} Bandai^{JP}	July 18, 1998	July 31, 2000	Unreleased		
Crisis City	Takara	Takara	June 4, 1998	Unreleased	Unreleased		
Critical Blow	Racdym	Banpresto	December 4, 1997	Unreleased	Unreleased		
Critical Depth	SingleTrac	GT Interactive	Unreleased	December 1999	November 22, 1997		
Criticom	Kronos Digital Entertainment	Vic Tokai	October 4, 1996	November 29, 1995	November 15, 1995		
Croc: Legend of the Gobbos	Argonaut Software	Fox Interactive^{NA/PAL}, Media Quest^{JP}	December 18, 1997	September 15, 1997	September 1, 1997	P	
Croc 2	Argonaut Software	Fox Interactive^{NA/PAL}, Koei^{JP}	September 2, 1999	August 3, 1999	August 15, 1999		
Croket! Kindan no Kinka Box	Konami	Konami	March 20, 2003	Unreleased	Unreleased		
Crossroad Crisis	Success	A1 Games	Unreleased	Unreleased	August 17, 2001		
Cross Romance: Koi to Mahjong to Hanafuda to	Nichibutsu	Nichibutsu	March 28, 1997	Unreleased	Unreleased		
Cross Tantei Monogatari	WorkJam	WorkJam	October 21, 1999	Unreleased	Unreleased		
Cross Tantei Monogatari 1: Kouhen	WorkJam	WorkJam	October 28, 2000	Unreleased	Unreleased		
Cross Tantei Monogatari 1: Zenpen	WorkJam	WorkJam	September 28, 2000	Unreleased	Unreleased		
Crossword	Success	Success	January 27, 2000	Unreleased	Unreleased		
Crossword 2	Success	Success	November 30, 2000	Unreleased	Unreleased		
Crossword 3	Success	Success	May 24, 2001	Unreleased	Unreleased		
The Crow: City of Angels	Gray Matter	Acclaim	April 25, 1997	April 1997	February 28, 1997		
Crusader: No Remorse	Realtime Associates	Electronic Arts	Unreleased	March 1997	December 31, 1996		
Crusaders of Might and Magic	The 3DO Company	The 3DO Company	Unreleased	February 15, 2000	February 15, 2000		
CRW: Counter Revolution War	Natsu System	Acclaim Japan	August 30, 1996	Unreleased	Unreleased		
Crypt Killer •Henry Explorer^{JP}	Konami	Konami	March 7, 1997	March 21, 1997	May 3, 1997		
CT Special Forces	Light & Shadow Production	Light & Shadow Production	Unreleased	January 23, 2003	Unreleased		
CT Special Forces: Back To Hell •Elite Squad	Light & Shadow Production	Light & Shadow Production	Unreleased	October 15, 2003	Unreleased		
CT Special Forces 3: Bioterror	The Code Monkeys	Light & Shadow Production	Unreleased	April 2004	Unreleased		
Cu-On-Pa	T&E Soft	T&E Soft	October 9, 1997	Unreleased	Unreleased		
Cubix - Robots for Everyone: Race 'N Robots	Blitz Games	The 3DO Company	Unreleased	2002	November 9, 2001		
Culdcept Expansion	Media Factory	Media Factory	May 1, 1999	Unreleased	Unreleased		
Culdcept Expansion Plus (Note: update for Culdcept Expansion.)	Media Factory	Media Factory	November 30, 2000	Unreleased	Unreleased		
Curiosity kills the cat? (Koukishin wa Neko o Korosuka)	Eyst Pty. Ltd.	ASCII	November 26, 1998	Unreleased	Unreleased		
The Curling	Success	Success	July 1, 1999	Unreleased	Unreleased		
Cyberbots: Full Metal Madness	OeRSTED	Capcom	December 25, 1997	Unreleased	Unreleased		
Cyber Daisenryaku: Shutsugeki! Haruka-tai	Alfa System	SystemSoft	February 4, 1999	Unreleased	Unreleased		
Cyber Egg: Battle Champion	Bandai	Bandai	December 18, 1997	Unreleased	Unreleased		
Cyberia	Xatrix Entertainment	Interplay	February 16, 1996	August 1996	January 2, 1996		
Cybernetic Empire	Wolf Team, Nippon Telenet	Telenet Japan	August 5, 1999	Unreleased	Unreleased		
Cyber Org	Square	Square	April 22, 1999	Unreleased	Unreleased		
Cyber Sled	Namco	Namco^{JP}, Namco Hometek^{NA}, Sony Computer Entertainment^{PAL}	January 27, 1995	November 1995	October 18, 1995		
Cyberspeed	Mindscape	Mindscape	August 9, 1996	December 7, 1995	September 15, 1995		
CyberTiger	EA	EA	Unreleased	December 3, 1999	November 6, 1999		
Cyberwar	Soft Vision	Coconuts Japan	July 21, 1995	Unreleased	Unreleased		
Cyborg 009: The Block Kuzushi	Access	Bandai	October 10, 2002	Unreleased	Unreleased		
D	WARP	Acclaim	December 1, 1995	March 1996	February 3, 1996		
Dai-2-Ji Super Robot Taisen	WinkySoft	Banpresto	December 2, 1999	Unreleased	Unreleased		
Dai-3-Ji Super Robot Taisen	WinkySoft	Banpresto	December 22, 1999	Unreleased	Unreleased		
Dai-4-Ji Super Robot Taisen S	WinkySoft	Banpresto	January 26, 1996	Unreleased	Unreleased		
Daibouken Deluxe: Harukanaru Umi	Soft Office	Soft Office	April 18, 1997	Unreleased	Unreleased		
Daikoukai Jidai II	Koei	Koei	December 27, 1996	Unreleased	Unreleased		
Daikoukai Jidai Gaiden	Koei	Koei	October 2, 1997	Unreleased	Unreleased		
Daikoukai Jidai IV	Koei	Koei	December 2, 1999	Unreleased	Unreleased		
Daiobake Yashiki	Visit	Visit	July 2, 1998	Unreleased	Unreleased		
Daisenryaku: Master Combat	Dual	Oz Club	December 3, 1998	Unreleased	Unreleased		
Daisenryaku: Player's Spirit	Dual	Oz Club	March 29, 1996	Unreleased	Unreleased		
Dakar '97	Elcom	Virgin Interactive Entertainment	April 25, 1997	Unreleased	Unreleased		
The Dalmatians	The Code Monkeys	Midas Interactive	Unreleased	September 1, 2000	Unreleased		
Dalmatians 2	The Code Monkeys	Phoenix Games	Unreleased	March 28, 2003	Unreleased		
DamDam StompLand	Atelier Double	Sony Music Entertainment Japan	December 4, 1997	Unreleased	Unreleased		
Dance! Dance! Dance!	Konami	Konami	December 3, 1998	Unreleased	Unreleased		
Dance Dance Revolution (Japan)	Konami	Konami	April 10, 1999	Unreleased	Unreleased		
Dance Dance Revolution •Dancing Stage^{PAL,AUS}	Konami	Konami	Unreleased	March 22, 2001	March 22, 2001		
Dance Dance Revolution 2ndReMix	Konami	Konami	August 26, 1999	Unreleased	Unreleased		
Dance Dance Revolution 2ndReMix Append Club Version Vol.1 (Note: expansion for Dance Dance Revolution 2ndReMix.)	Konami	Konami	November 25, 1999	Unreleased	Unreleased		
Dance Dance Revolution 2ndReMix Append Club Version Vol.2 (Note: expansion for Dance Dance Revolution 2ndReMix.)	Konami	Konami	December 22, 1999	Unreleased	Unreleased		
Dance Dance Revolution 3rdMix	Konami	Konami	June 1, 2000	Unreleased	Unreleased		
Dance Dance Revolution 4thMix •Dance Dance Revolution Konamix^{NA} •Dancing Stage Party Edition^{PAL,AUS}	Konami	Konami	March 15, 2001	2002|11|15	April 23, 2002	P	
Dance Dance Revolution 5thMix	Konami	Konami	September 20, 2001	Unreleased	Unreleased		
Dance Dance Revolution Disney Mix •Dance Dance Revolution Disney's Rave^{JP} •Dancing Stage Disney Mix^{PAL,AUS}	Konami	Konami	September 17, 2001	September 28, 2001	September 18, 2001		
Dance Dance Revolution Extra Mix	Konami	Konami	June 7, 2001	Unreleased	Unreleased		
Dancing Blade Katteni Momotenshi!	Konami	TV Tokyo	August 27, 1998	Unreleased	Unreleased		
Dancing Blade Katteni Momotenshi II: Tears of Eden	Konami	TV Tokyo	March 18, 1999	Unreleased	Unreleased		
Dancing Stage EuroMix	Konami	Konami	Unreleased	February 16, 2000^{AU,PAL}	Unreleased		
Dancing Stage featuring Dreams Come True	Konami	Konami	April 20, 2000	Unreleased	Unreleased		
Dancing Stage featuring True Kiss Destination	Konami	Konami	December 9, 1999	Unreleased	Unreleased		
Dancing Stage Fever	Konami	Konami	Unreleased	October 24, 2003	Unreleased		
Dancing Stage Fusion	Konami	Konami	Unreleased	November 5, 2004	Unreleased		
Dance: UK	Broadsworld Interactive	Big Ben Interactive	Unreleased	October 3, 2003	Unreleased		
Dance: UK eXtra Trax (Note: expansion for Dance: UK.)	Broadsword Interactive	Big Ben Interactive	Unreleased	April 30, 2004	Unreleased		
Dangan	Mediamuse	KSS	February 24, 2000	Unreleased	Unreleased		
Danger Girl	n-Space	THQ	Unreleased	December 15, 2000	September 14, 2000		
Dare Devil Derby 3D •Supersonic Racers^{PAL}	Supersonic	Mindscape	November 27, 1997	October 1996	October 31, 1996		
Darius Gaiden	Nexus Interactive	Taito	December 20, 1996	Unreleased	Unreleased		
Dark Hunter: Jou Ijigen Gakuen	Koei	Koei	February 24, 2000	Unreleased	Unreleased		
Dark Hunter: Shita Youma no Mori	Koei	Koei	May 30, 1997	Unreleased	Unreleased		
Darklight Conflict	Rage Software	Electronic Arts	Unreleased	Unreleased	June 15, 1997		
Dark Seed	Cyberdreams	Gaga	October 27, 1995	Unreleased	Unreleased		
Dark Seed II	Cyberdreams	B-Factory	September 18, 1997	Unreleased	Unreleased		
Darkstalkers: The Night Warriors	Capcom	WW: Capcom; PAL: Virgin Interactive Entertainment	March 22, 1996	November 1996	June 10, 1996		
Darkstalkers 3	Capcom	Capcom	November 5, 1998	November 15, 1999	November 30, 1998		
Darkstone	Delphine Software International	Electronic Arts	Unreleased	Unreleased	January 28, 2001		
Dark Tales: From the Lost Soul	Sammy	Sammy	September 28, 1999	Unreleased	Unreleased		
Dave Mirra Freestyle BMX	Z-Axis	Acclaim Entertainment	Unreleased	2000	September 30, 2000		
Dave Mirra Freestyle BMX: Maximum Remix (Note: update for Dave Mirra Freestyle BMX.)	Z-Axis	Acclaim Entertainment	Unreleased	June 8, 2001	May 21, 2001		
David Beckham Soccer	Rage Software	Rage Software	Unreleased	November 23, 2001	July 2, 2002		
Davis Cup Complete Tennis	Dome Software	Telstar	Unreleased	October 1, 1996	Unreleased		
Dead Ball Zone	Rage Software Limited	GT Interactive	Unreleased	July 1998	March 10, 1998		
Dead in the Water	ASC Games	Player 1	Unreleased	Unreleased	March 2, 1998		
Dead or Alive	Tecmo	Tecmo^{JP/NA}, Sony Computer Entertainment^{EU}	March 12, 1998	July 1, 1998	January 3, 1998		
Deadheat Road	Nichibutsu	Nichibutsu	April 12, 1996	Unreleased	Unreleased		
Deadly Skies	Funcom	Coconuts Japan	October 23, 1997	Unreleased	Unreleased		
Death Wing	Cybertech Designs	Cybertech Designs	October 26, 1996	Unreleased	Unreleased		
Deathtrap Dungeon	Asylum studios	Eidos Interactive	Unreleased	April 1998	January 4, 1998		
DeathMask	Electric Dreams Inc.	Vantan International	February 9, 1996	Unreleased	Unreleased		
Debut 21	Tose	NEC Interchannel	September 10, 1998	Unreleased	Unreleased		
Deception III: Dark Delusion	Tecmo	Tecmo	December 9, 1999	Unreleased	March 1, 2000		
Deep Freeze	Talon	Sammy Corporation	January 14, 1999	Unreleased	Unreleased		
The Deep: Ushinawareta Shinkai	Marionette	Acclaim Japan	October 18, 1996	Unreleased	Unreleased		
Deep Sea Adventure: Kaitei Kyuu Panthalassa no Nazo	Barnhouse Effect	Takara	March 20, 1997	Unreleased	Unreleased		
Defcon 5	Millennium Interactive	Data East^{NA}, Psygnosis^{PAL}, Multisoft^{JP}	May 17, 1996	February 1996	November 24, 1995		
Dekiru! Game Center	Shoeisha	Shoeisha	January 14, 1999	Unreleased	Unreleased		
Delta Force: Urban Warfare	Rebellion Developments	Novalogic	Unreleased	August 9, 2002	July 18, 2002		
Demolition Racer	Pitbull Syndicate	Infogrames North America	Unreleased	November 1, 1999	August 31, 1999		
Dengeki Construction: Ochige-Yarouze!	Fupac	MediaWorks	June 25, 1998	Unreleased	Unreleased		
Denki Groove Jigoku V	Opus	Sony Music Entertainment Japan	January 8, 1998	Unreleased	Unreleased		
Denpa Shounenteki Game	Hudson	Hudson	April 2, 1998	Unreleased	Unreleased		
Densetsu Kemono no Ana: Monster Complete World Ver. 2 (Note: update for Monster Complete World.)	Idea Factory	Idea Factory	October 28, 1999	Unreleased	Unreleased		
Densha Daisuki: Plarail de Ippai	Tomy Corporation	Tomy Corporation	December 23, 1998	Unreleased	Unreleased		
Densha de Go! •Simple 1500 Series Vol. 103: The Ganso Densha Utenshi - Densha de Go!^{JP}	Taito	Taito	December 18, 1997	Unreleased	Unreleased		
Densha de Go! 2	Taito	Taito	March 18, 1999	Unreleased	Unreleased		
Densha de Go! Nagoya Railroad •Simple 1500 Series Vol. 102: The Densha Utenshu^{JP}	Taito	Taito	January 27, 2000	Unreleased	Unreleased		
Densha de Go! Professional Shiyou	Taito	Taito	December 9, 1999	Unreleased	Unreleased		
Depth^{JP} •Fluid^{PAL} •Sub^{EU}	Opus	Sony Computer Entertainment	December 6, 1996	August 1, 1998	Unreleased		
Derby Jockey 2001	Asmik Ace	Asmik Ace	January 8, 2001	Unreleased	Unreleased		
Derby Jockey R	Graphic Research	Asmik Ace	February 28, 1997	Unreleased	Unreleased		
Derby Stallion	ASCII Corporation	ASCII Corporation	July 17, 1997	Unreleased	Unreleased		
Derby Stallion '99	ASCII Corporation	ASCII Corporation	September 30, 1999	Unreleased	Unreleased		
Descent	Parallax Software	Interplay Entertainment	January 26, 1996	May 1996	March 12, 1996		
Descent II •Descent Maximum	Parallax Software	Interplay Entertainment	Unreleased	May 1997	April 30, 1997		
Deserted Island	KSS	KSS	November 29, 1996	Unreleased	Unreleased		
Destrega	Koei	Koei^{JP/NA}, Sony Computer Entertainment^{EU}	September 23, 1998	October 8, 1999	February 4, 1999		
Destruction Derby	Reflections Interactive	Psygnosis	February 9, 1996	October 20, 1995	November 16, 1995	P	
Destruction Derby 2	Reflections Interactive	Psygnosis	February 21, 1997	January 13, 1997	November 15, 1996	P	
Destruction Derby Raw	Studio 33	Sony Computer Entertainment^{EU}, Midway Games^{EU}	Unreleased	June 30, 2000	September 15, 2000	P	
Destructo 2 •Simple 1500 Series Vol. 48: The Puzzle 2^{JP}	Axes Art Amuse	D3 Publisher^{JP}, Phoenix Games^{EU}	December 7, 2000	June 10, 2003	Unreleased		
Detana TwinBee Yahho! Deluxe Pack	KCET	Konami	September 29, 1995	Unreleased	Unreleased		
Detective Barbie: The Mystery Cruise	Runecraft	NA: Mattel Interactive; PAL: Vivendi Universal Interactive Publishing	Unreleased	2001	November 28, 2000		
Detective Mouse	The Code Monkeys	Phoenix Games	Unreleased	2003	Unreleased		
DeviceReign	Starlight Marry	Media Works	February 25, 1999	Unreleased	Unreleased		
Devil Dice	Shift	Sony Computer Entertainment	June 18, 1998	June 29, 1998	September 15, 1998		
Devilman	Bandai	Bandai	April 13, 2000	Unreleased	Unreleased		
Dexter's Laboratory: Mandark's Lab?	Red Lemon Studios	BAM! Entertainment	Unreleased	April 12, 2002	May 4, 2002		
Dezaemon Kids!	Athena	Athena	October 22, 1998	Unreleased	Unreleased		
Dezaemon Plus	Athena	Athena	May 24, 1996	Unreleased	Unreleased		
Diablo	Climax Group	Activision	Unreleased	April 1998	March 11, 1998		
Die Hard Trilogy	Probe Entertainment	Fox Interactive	December 13, 1996	December 6, 1996	September 15, 1996	P	
Die Hard Trilogy 2: Viva Las Vegas	n-Space	Fox Interactive	Unreleased	February 24, 2000	February 24, 2000		
Diet Nyuumon Set Undou Kaishou!	Twilight Express	Twilight Express	December 20, 2001	Unreleased	Unreleased		
Digical League	Now Production	Aques	June 20, 1997	Unreleased	Unreleased		
DigiCro: Digital Number Crossword	Atlus	Atlus	November 1, 1996	Unreleased	Unreleased		
Digimon Digital Card Battle	BEC	Bandai	December 21, 2000	July 19, 2002	June 28, 2001		
Digimon Park	Chime	Bandai	July 26, 2001	Unreleased	Unreleased		
Digimon Rumble Arena	Bandai	Bandai	December 6, 2001	July 12, 2002	February 20, 2002		
Digimon Tamers: Pocket Culumon	Bandai	Bandai	July 26, 2001	Unreleased	Unreleased		
Digimon World	Bandai	Bandai	January 28, 1999	July 6, 2001	June 30, 2000	P	
Digimon World 2	BEC	Bandai	July 27, 2000	Unreleased	May 1, 2001		
Digimon World 3 •Digimon World 2003^{EU}	BEC	Bandai	July 4, 2002	November 29, 2002	June 1, 2002		
Digimon World: Digital Card Battle	Bandai	Bandai	December 22, 1999	Unreleased	Unreleased		
Digital Figure Iina	Natsume Co., Ltd.	Imagineer	October 22, 1998	Unreleased	Unreleased		
Digital Glider Airman	Ornith	ASK	September 14, 1999	Unreleased	Unreleased		
Dino Crisis	Capcom	Capcom^{JP/NA}, Virgin Interactive Entertainment^{PAL}	July 1, 1999	October 1, 1999	September 1, 1999		
Dino Crisis 2	Capcom	Capcom^{JP/NA}, Virgin Interactive Entertainment^{PAL}	September 13, 2000	November 24, 2000	October 1, 2000		
Dinomaster Party	Similis	Light & Shadow Production	Unreleased	2000	Unreleased		
Dinosaurs	The Code Monkeys	Phoenix Games	Unreleased	March 28, 2003	Unreleased		
Dioramos		Ponos	November 30, 2000	Unreleased	Unreleased		
Dirt Jockey	DDL, Inc.	Mastiff	Unreleased	Unreleased	July 10, 2003		
Disc Derby	Dazz	Dazz	March 30, 2000	Unreleased	Unreleased		
Discworld	Perfect Entertainment	Psygnosis	July 5, 1996	October 1995	November 15, 1995		
Discworld II	Perfect Entertainment	Psygnosis	Unreleased	November 1997	September 24, 1997		
Discworld Noir	Perfect Entertainment	GT Interactive	Unreleased	2000	Unreleased		
Disney's Aladdin in Nasira's Revenge	Argonaut Games	Sony Computer Entertainment	Unreleased	December 1, 2000	March 15, 2001	P	
Disney's Dinosaur	Sandbox Studios	Ubi Soft	Unreleased	October 6, 2000	August 29, 2000	P	
Disney's Donald Duck: Goin' Quackers •Donald Duck: Quack Attack^{PAL}	Ubi Soft Shanghai	Ubi Soft	Unreleased	December 15, 2000	November 14, 2000	P	
Disney's Hercules •Disney's Action Game featuring Hercules^{PAL}	Eurocom	Virgin Interactive Entertainment^{NA (1997)}, Majesco Sales^{NA (1998)}, Sony Computer Entertainment^{PAL}	Unreleased	November 1997	June 20, 1997	P	
Disney's Learning with Mickey	Revolution Software	Sony Computer Entertainment	Unreleased	2002	Unreleased		
Disney's Lilo & Stitch •Lilo & Stitch: Trouble in Paradise^{PAL}	Blitz Games	Sony Computer Entertainment	Unreleased	September 27, 2002	June 14, 2002	P	
Disney's Peter Pan in Return to Neverland	Doki Denki	Sony Computer Entertainment	Unreleased	February 14, 2002	February 14, 2002	P	
Disney's Pooh's Party Game: In Search of the Treasure •Winnie l'Ourson : C'est la récré^{FR}	Doki Denki	Electronic Arts^{NA}, Sony Computer Entertainment^{PAL}	Unreleased	Unreleased	November 28, 2001		
Disney's Story Studio - Mulan	Revolution Software	NewKidCo^{NA}, Sony Computer Entertainment^{PAL}	Unreleased	September 17, 1999	December 15, 1999		
Disney's The Little Mermaid II	Blitz Games	THQ^{NA}, Sony Computer Entertainment^{PAL}	Unreleased	2000	September 25, 2000		
Disney's Tarzan	Eurocom	SCEE^{NA/PAL}, Konami^{JP}	December 2, 1999	November 1999	June 30, 1999	P	
Disruptor	Insomniac Games	Interplay (PAL JP Versions), Universal Interactive (USA Version)	April 11, 1997	December 1996	November 30, 1996		
Diver's Dream/Dolphin's Dream	Konami	Konami	September 10, 1998	September 3, 2001	Unreleased		
The Divide: Enemies Within	Radical Entertainment	Viacom New Media	Unreleased	Unreleased	December 20, 1996		
Docchi Mecha!	Sony Computer Entertainment	Sony Computer Entertainment	April 27, 2000	Unreleased	Unreleased		
DoDonPachi	Cave	SPS	September 10, 1998	Unreleased	Unreleased		
The Dog Master	Visit	Visit	August 7, 2003	Unreleased	Unreleased		
Dodgem Arena	Formula Game Development	Project Two Interactive	Unreleased	1998	Unreleased		
Dokapon! Okori no Tetsuken	Asmik Ace Entertainment	Asmik Ace Entertainment	November 5, 1998	Unreleased	Unreleased		
Doki Doki On Air	Dream Japan	Bottom Up	June 11, 1998	Unreleased	Unreleased		
Doki Doki On Air 2	Dream Japan	Bottom Up	March 11, 1999	Unreleased	Unreleased		
Doki Doki Poyacchio	M2	King Records	September 10, 1998	Unreleased	Unreleased		
Doki Doki Pretty League	Xing Entertainment	Xing Entertainment	March 28, 1997	Unreleased	Unreleased		
Doki Doki Pretty League: Lovely Star	Xing Entertainment	Xing Entertainment	December 13, 2001	Unreleased	Unreleased		
Doki Doki Pretty League: Nekketsu Otome Seishunki	Xing Entertainment	Xing Entertainment	September 23, 1998	Unreleased	Unreleased		
Doki Doki Shutter Chance	Nippon Ichi Software	Nippon Ichi Software	October 23, 1997	Unreleased	Unreleased		
Doki Oki	Banpresto	Banpresto	December 22, 1995	Unreleased	Unreleased		
Doko Demo Issyo: Calpis Water Version	Sony	Sony	February 21, 2000	Unreleased	Unreleased		
Doko Demo Issyo	Sony	Sony	July 22, 1999	Unreleased	Unreleased		
Doko Demo Isshyo Tsuika Disk: Koneko Mo Isshyo (Note: expansion for Doko Demo Issyo.)	Sony	Sony	January 27, 2000	Unreleased	Unreleased		
Dokodemo Hamster 2	Interbec	Bec	August 31, 2000	Unreleased	Unreleased		
Dokodemo Hamster 4	Atelier Double	Bec	August 9, 2001	Unreleased	Unreleased		
Dokodemo Hamster B! Quick Club	Interbec	Bec	February 28, 2002	Unreleased	Unreleased		
Dokomademo Aoku...	Kid	Kid	February 21, 2002	Unreleased	Unreleased		
Dokonjou Gaeru: The Mahjong	Yuki	Bandai	January 24, 2002	Unreleased	Unreleased		
DonPachi	Cave	SPS	October 18, 1996	Unreleased	Unreleased		
Doom	Williams Entertainment	Williams Entertainment^{NA}, GT Interactive^{EU}	April 19, 1996	December 1995	November 16, 1995	P	
Dora the Explorer: Barnyard Buddies	ImaginEngine	Global Star Software	Unreleased	2004	November 18, 2003		
Doraemon 2: SOS! Otogi no Kuni	Pre Stage	Epoch Co.	February 21, 1997	Unreleased	Unreleased		
Doraemon 3: Makai no Dungeon	Kan's	Epoch Co.	December 14, 2000	Unreleased	Unreleased		
Doraemon: Nobita to Fukkatsu no Hoshi	SAS Sakata	Epoch Co.	February 16, 1996	Unreleased	Unreleased		
Doraemon: Himitsu no Yojigen Pocket	Bandai	Bandai	November 29, 2001	Unreleased	Unreleased		
Dosukoi Densetsu	KSS	KSS	May 20, 1999	Unreleased	Unreleased		
Dotsubo-Chan	Three Spirits	Universe Kaihatsu	September 14, 2000	Unreleased	Unreleased		
Double Dragon	Technos Japan	Urban Plant	April 26, 1996	Unreleased	Unreleased		
Douga de Puzzle! Puppukupu	Agenda	Argent	July 7, 1995	Unreleased	Unreleased		
Dōkyūsei 2		ELF Corporation	August 7, 1997	Unreleased	Unreleased		
Doukyuusei Mahjong	Aroma	Aroma	January 17, 1997	Unreleased	Unreleased		
Doubutsu Chara Navi Uranai 2: Kosei Shinri / Renai Uranai Puzzle	Culture Brain	Culture Brain	September 18, 2003	Unreleased	Unreleased		
Doumu no Yabou: F1 GP Nippon	OZ Club	OZ Club	October 25, 1996	Unreleased	Unreleased		
Doumu no Yabou 2: The Race of Champions	OZ Club	OZ Club	November 19, 1998	Unreleased	Unreleased		
Downhill Snow	Pack-In-Video	Victor Interactive Software	August 28, 1998	Unreleased	Unreleased		
Dr. Rin ni Kiitemite!	Hudson	Hudson	November 28, 2002	Unreleased	Unreleased		
Dr. Slump	Bandai	Bandai	March 18, 1999	Unreleased	Unreleased		
Dracula 2: The Last Sanctuary	Index+	Cryo Interactive	Unreleased	July 6, 2001	May 6, 2002		
Dracula: Resurrection	Canal+ Multimedia, France Telecom Multimedia, Index+	Microids	Unreleased	February 6, 2000	June 2001		
Dragon Ball GT: Final Bout	Tose	Bandai, Atari^{NA, 2004}	August 25, 1997	November 6, 1997	July 29, 1997		
Dragon Ball Z: Idainaru Dragon Ball Densetsu	Bandai	Bandai	May 31, 1996	Unreleased	Unreleased		
Dragon Ball Z: Ultimate Battle 22	Tose	Bandai^{JP/EU}, Infogrames^{NA}	July 28, 1995	June 1996	March 25, 2003		
Dragon Beat: Legend of Pinball	Map Japan	Map Japan	November 27, 1997	Unreleased	Unreleased		
Dragon Drive: Tactics Break	Bandai	Bandai	October 3, 2002	Unreleased	Unreleased		
DragonHeart: Fire & Steel	Funcom	Acclaim Entertainment	Unreleased	March 1997	November 30, 1996		
Dragon Knight 4	Banpresto	Banpresto	February 27, 1997	Unreleased	Unreleased		
Dragon Knights Glorious	Pandora Box	Pandora Box	November 18, 1999	Unreleased	Unreleased		
Dragon Money	E.O. Imagination	Micro Cabin	May 4, 1999	Unreleased	Unreleased		
Dragon Quest IV	ArtePiazza, Heartbeat	Enix	November 22, 2001	Unreleased	Unreleased		
Dragon Quest Monsters 1 & 2	Tose	Enix	May 30, 2002	Unreleased	Unreleased		
Dragon Quest VII	Heart Beat	Enix	August 26, 2000	Unreleased	October 31, 2001		
Dragonseeds	Jaleco Entertainment	Jaleco Entertainment	August 6, 1998	Unreleased	September 30, 1998		
Dragstars •Burn Out^{JP}	Midas Interactive	Midas Interactive^{PAL}, Success	August 24, 2000	April 13, 2002	Unreleased		
Dragon Tales: Dragon Seek	Zed Two Limited	NewKidCo^{NA}, Ubi Soft^{EU}	Unreleased	March 31, 2001	November 29, 2000		
Dragon Valor	Namco	Namco^{JP}, Namco Hometek^{NA}, Sony Computer Entertainment^{EU}	December 9, 1999	June 30, 2000	October 16, 2000		
The Dream Circus	TGL	TGL	February 25, 1999	Unreleased	Unreleased		
Dream Generation: Koi Ka? Shigoto Ka!?	NCS	NCS	August 13, 1998	Unreleased	Unreleased		
Dreams to Reality	Cryo Interactive	Cryo Interactive	Unreleased	November 15, 1998^{DE,ES,FR,IT,PAL}	Unreleased		
Driver •Driver: You Are the Wheelman^{NA}	Reflections Interactive	GT Interactive	Unreleased	June 25, 1999	June 30, 1999	P	
Driver 2	Reflections Interactive	Infogrames	Unreleased	November 17, 2000	November 13, 2000	P	
The Drug Store	Human Entertainment	Human Entertainment	August 6, 1998	Unreleased	Unreleased		
Druid: Yami e no Tsuisekisha	Synthetic Dimensions	Koei	February 19, 1998	Unreleased	Unreleased		
Ducati World Racing Challenge	Attention to Detail	Acclaim Entertainment	Unreleased	February 9, 2001	January 2, 2001		
Duke Nukem: Total Meltdown •Duke Nukem^{PAL}	3D Realms, Aardvark Software	GT Interactive	Unreleased	December 1997	September 30, 1997		
Duke Nukem: Land of the Babes	n-Space	Infogrames^{NA}, Take-Two Interactive^{PAL}	Unreleased	April 6, 2001	September 19, 2000		
Duke Nukem: Time to Kill	n-Space	GT Interactive^{NA}, Take-Two Interactive^{PAL}	Unreleased	February 15, 1999	September 30, 1998		
The Dukes of Hazzard: Racing for Home	Sinister Games	SouthPeak Interactive^{NA}, Ubi Soft^{EU}	Unreleased	2000	November 30, 1999		
The Dukes of Hazzard II: Daisy Dukes It Out	Sinister Games	SouthPeak Interactive^{NA}, Ubi Soft^{EU}	Unreleased	March 23, 2001	November 6, 2000		
Dune 2000 •Dune^{PAL}	Intelligent Games, Westwood Studios	Electronic Arts	Unreleased	February 1, 2000	October 31, 1999		
Dungeon Creator	Electronic Arts Victor	Electronic Arts Victor	May 31, 1996	Unreleased	Unreleased		
Dungeon Shoutenkai: Densetsu no Ken Hajimemashita	Kinotrope	Kodansha	October 29, 1998	Unreleased	Unreleased		
DX Hyakunin Isshu	Takara	Takara	December 6, 2001	Unreleased	Unreleased		
DX Jinsei Game	Takara	Takara	March 22, 1996	Unreleased	Unreleased		
DX Jinsei Game II	Takara	Takara	July 24, 1997	Unreleased	Unreleased		
DX Jinsei Game III	Takara	Takara	December 2, 1999	Unreleased	Unreleased		
DX Jinsei Game IV	Takara	Takara	November 29, 2001	Unreleased	Unreleased		
DX Jinsei Game V	Takara	Takara	December 5, 2002	Unreleased	Unreleased		
DX Nippon Tokkyu Ryokou Game: Let's Travel in Japan	Takara	Takara	December 20, 1996	Unreleased	Unreleased		
DX Okuman Chouja Game	Takara	Takara	December 6, 1996	Unreleased	Unreleased		
DX Okuman Chouja Game II	Takara	Takara	September 23, 1998	Unreleased	Unreleased		
DX Shachou Game	Takara	Takara	July 8, 1999	Unreleased	Unreleased		
DX Monopoly	Takara	Takara	December 21, 2000	Unreleased	Unreleased		
Dynamite Soccer 98 •Simple 1500 Series Vol. 67: The Soccer: Dynamite Soccer 1500	A-Max	A-Max	June 4, 1998	Unreleased	Unreleased		
Dynamite Soccer 2000	A-Max	A-Max	October 26, 2000	Unreleased	Unreleased		
Dynamite Soccer 2002	A-Max	A-Max	May 16, 2002	Unreleased	Unreleased		
Dynamite Soccer 2004 Final	A-Max	A-Max	April 15, 2004	Unreleased	Unreleased		
Dynasty Warriors	Omega Force	Koei	February 28, 1997	December 1997	June 30, 1997		
Eagle One: Harrier Attack	Glass Ghost	Infogrames	Unreleased	2000	March 31, 2000		
Earthworm Jim 2	Screaming Pink	Virgin Interactive Entertainment	Unreleased	November 1996	Unreleased		
Easter Bunny's Big Day	Seven Computerized Creations	Mastiff	Unreleased	Unreleased	April 1, 2003		
Eberouge	Japan Media Programming	Takara	May 30, 1997	Unreleased	Unreleased		
Eberouge 2	Japan Media Programming	Takara	February 25, 1999	Unreleased	Unreleased		
Eberouge Special: Koi to Mahou no Gakuen Seikatsu	Japan Media Programming	Takara	June 11, 1998	Unreleased	Unreleased		
Ebisu Yoshikazu no Ooana Keiti	Seta Corporation	Seta Corporation	August 30, 1996	Unreleased	Unreleased		
Echo Night	FromSoftware	Agetec	August 13, 1998	Unreleased	July 31, 1999		
Echo Night 2: The Lord of Nightmares	FromSoftware	FromSoftware	August 13, 1998	Unreleased	Unreleased		
Ecsaform	Bandai	Bandai	January 28, 1999	Unreleased	Unreleased		
ECW Anarchy Rulz	Acclaim Studios Salt Lake City	Acclaim Entertainment	Unreleased	September 1, 2000	August 15, 2000		
ECW Hardcore Revolution	Acclaim Studios Salt Lake City	Acclaim	Unreleased	2000	February 17, 2000		
eexy life: East End X Yuri	Sony Music Entertainment Japan	Sony Music Entertainment Japan	October 25, 1996	Unreleased	Unreleased		
Efficus: Kono Omoi o Kimi ni...	Genki	Genki	October 1, 1998	Unreleased	Unreleased		
Egg	Beyond Interactive	Toshiba EMI	February 19, 1998	Unreleased	Unreleased		
Eggs of Steel: Charlie's Eggcellent Adventure	Rhythm & Hues	Enix^{JP}, Atlus USA^{NA}	July 30, 1998	Unreleased	November 17, 1998		
Egypt 1156 B.C.: Tomb of the Pharaoh	Cryo Interactive	Cryo Interactive, Canal+ Multimedia Réunion des Musées Nationaux	Unreleased	September 10, 1999	Unreleased		
Egypt II: The Heliopolis Prophecy	Cryo Interactive	Cryo Interactive, Réunion des Musées Nationaux	Unreleased	September 14, 2001	Unreleased		
Ehrgeiz: God Bless the Ring	Square	Square^{JP/EU}, Square Electronic Arts^{NA}	December 17, 1998	February 8, 2000	April 30, 1999		
Eikan wa Kimi ni 4	Artdink	Artdink	August 5, 1999	Unreleased	Unreleased		
Eikou no St Andrews	Seta Corporation	Shogakukan	August 28, 1997	Unreleased	Unreleased		
Einhänder	Square	Square^{JP}, Sony Computer Entertainment^{NA}	November 20, 1997	Unreleased	May 5, 1998		
Eisei Meijin	Konami	Konami	September 8, 1995	Unreleased	Unreleased		
Eisei Meijin II	Konami	Konami	December 20, 1996	Unreleased	Unreleased		
Eisei Meijin III	Konami	Konami	March 18, 1999	Unreleased	Unreleased		
Eithéa	TamTam	Atlus	February 22, 2001	Unreleased	Unreleased		
Eko Eko Azarak: Wizard of Darkness	Polygram Magic of Japan	Polygram Magic of Japan	December 29, 1995	Unreleased	Unreleased		
Eko no Kids: Taga Tame Hi Kane Ha Naru	TGL	TGL	April 18, 1997	Unreleased	Unreleased		
Elan	Visco	Visco	April 1, 1999	Unreleased	Unreleased		
Elan Plus (Note: update for Elan.)	Visco	Visco	May 11, 2000	Unreleased	Unreleased		
Eldergate	KCET	Konami	June 22, 2000	Unreleased	Unreleased		
Elemental Gearbolt	Alfa System	Working Designs, SCEI	December 11, 1997	Unreleased	June 30, 1998		
Elemental Pinball	DigiCube	Midas Interactive^{PAL}, DigiCube^{JP}	February 21, 2002	June 13, 2003	Unreleased		
Elf o Karu Monotachi	Altron	Altron	August 7, 1997	Unreleased	Unreleased		
Elf o Karu Monotachi II	Altron	Altron	August 13, 1998	Unreleased	Unreleased		
Elf o Karu Monotachi: Hanafuda Hen	Altron	Altron	August 28, 1997	Unreleased	Unreleased		
Elfin Paradise	Fill-In Cafe	ASK	April 25, 1997	Unreleased	Unreleased		
Eliminator	Magenta Software	Psygnosis	Unreleased	February 1, 1999	February 28, 1999		
EMIT Value Set	Koei	Koei	September 29, 1995	Unreleased	Unreleased		
Emmyrea	Kid	Square	May 24, 2001	Unreleased	Unreleased		
The Emperor's New Groove	Argonaut Games	Sony Computer Entertainment	Unreleased	February 16, 2001	November 13, 2000	P	
End Sector	ASCII	ASCII	September 23, 1998	Unreleased	Unreleased		
Endless Season: Anoko Doko Noko	Success	Success	July 22, 1999	Unreleased	Unreleased		
Enen Angel	Media Factory	Media Factory	February 22, 2001	Unreleased	Unreleased		
Engacho!	Nihon Application Co.	Nihon Application Co.	November 18, 1999	Unreleased	Unreleased		
Enigma	Omega Force	Koei	April 2, 1998	Unreleased	Unreleased		
EOS: Edge of Skyhigh	Micronet co., Ltd.	Micronet co., Ltd.	July 3, 1997	Unreleased	Unreleased		
Epidemic	Genki	Sony Music Entertainment Japan^{JP}, Sony Computer Entertainment^{NA/EU}	December 29, 1995	March 1997	June 14, 1996		
Equestrian Showcase^{NA} •Equestriad 2001^{PAL}	Tantalus	Mud Duck Productions^{NA}, Midas Interactive^{PAL}	Unreleased	February 7, 2003	May 9, 2003		
ESPN MLS GameNight	Saffire, Konami Computer Entertainment Tokyo	Konami	Unreleased	Unreleased	September 19, 2000		
ESPN X-Games Pro Boarder	Radical Entertainment	Electronic Arts	March 11, 1999	1998	October 31, 1998		
E.T.: Interplanetary Mission	Santa Cruz Games	NewKidCo^{NA}, Ubi Soft^{EU}	Unreleased	April 5, 2002	December 30, 2002		
Eternal Eyes	TamTam	Sunsoft	December 2, 1999	2000	October 31, 2000		
Eternal Melody	MediaWorks	MediaWorks	November 22, 1996	Unreleased	Unreleased		
Europe Racer	Davilex	Davilex	Unreleased	September 14, 2001	Unreleased		
European Super League	Coyote Developments Ltd	Virgin Interactive Entertainment	Unreleased	March 2, 2001	Unreleased		
EVE The Fatal Attraction	C's Ware	NetVillage	September 27, 2001	Unreleased	Unreleased		
EVE: The Lost One	Tose	Imadio	December 23, 1998	Unreleased	Unreleased		
Eve Zero	C's Ware	NetVillage	March 30, 2000	Unreleased	Unreleased		
Evergreen Avenue	Vridge	Datam Polystar	September 13, 2001	Unreleased	Unreleased		
Everybody's Golf^{PAL} •Hot Shots Golf^{NA}•Minna no Golf^{JP}	Camelot Software	Sony Computer Entertainment	July 17, 1997	June 1, 1998	April 30, 1998		
Everybody's Golf 2^{PAL} •Hot Shots Golf 2^{NA}	Clap Hanz	Sony Computer Entertainment	July 29, 1999	July 24, 2000	March 7, 2000		
Evil Dead: Hail to the King	Heavy Iron Studios	THQ	Unreleased	June 22, 2001	December 4, 2000		
Evil Zone •Eretzvaju^{JP}	Yuke's	Yuke's^{JP}, Titus Interactive^{NA/EU}	January 14, 1999	1999	May 31, 1999		
Evo's Space Adventures	Runecraft	Take 2 Interactive	Unreleased	June 2000	Unreleased		
Exalegiuse	Kogado Studio	Imagineer	February 5, 1998	Unreleased	Unreleased		
Excalibur 2555 AD	Telstar Electronic Studios Ltd	Telstar Electronic Studios Ltd	Unreleased	March 1997	September 30, 1997		
Exector	Arc System Works	Arc System Works	September 22, 1995	Unreleased	Unreleased		
Exodus Guilty	Abel Software	Imadio	November 26, 1998	Unreleased	Unreleased		
Expendable •Millennium Soldier: Expendable^{PAL}	Rage Software	Infogrames	Unreleased	November 16, 1999	April 22, 2000		
Expert	Nichibutsu	Nichibutsu	May 31, 1996	Unreleased	Unreleased		
Explosive Racing •X.Racing^{JP}	Toka	Funsoft^{PAL}Nichibutsu^{JP}	February 11, 1998	December 5, 1997	Unreleased		
Extra Bright	To One	ASCII Entertainment	December 6, 1996	Unreleased	Unreleased		
Extreme 500	Ascaron	THQ	Unreleased	March 15, 2000	Unreleased		
Extreme Ghostbusters: Ultimate Invasion	Similis	Light & Shadow Production	Unreleased	March 2004	Unreleased		
Extreme Go-Kart Racing •Kart Race - Kimete wa Drift!^{JP}	Now Production	Agetec	December 7, 2000	Unreleased	September 22, 2003		
Extreme Pinball	Epic Games	Electronic Arts	Unreleased	April 1996	March 28, 1996		
Extreme Power	Profire	CS	May 31, 1996	Unreleased	Unreleased		
F-1 Grand Prix 1996: Team Unei Simulation	Tomcat System	Coconuts Japan	January 17, 1997	Unreleased	Unreleased		
F1 2000	Visual Sciences	Electronic Arts	January 6, 2000	June 10, 2000	March 31, 2000		
F1 Championship Season 2000 (Note: update for F1 2000.)	Visual Sciences	Electronic Arts	Unreleased	November 24, 2000	September 30, 2000	P	
F1 Racing Championship	Ubi Soft Shanghai, Ubi Soft Milan	Video System	Unreleased	April 30, 2000	October 11, 2000		
F1 World Grand Prix 2000	Eutechnyx	Video System	Unreleased	March 23, 2001	March 30, 2001		
F1 World Grand Prix: 1999 Season	Lankhor	Video System^{EU}, Eidos Interactive^{NA}	Unreleased	December 30, 1999	December 30, 1999		
FA Manager	Krisalis Software	Eidos Interactive	Unreleased	August 1999	Unreleased		
The FA Premier League Football Manager 2000	Krisalis Software	Electronic Arts	Unreleased	October 1999	Unreleased		
The FA Premier League Football Manager 2001	Electronic Arts	Electronic Arts	Unreleased	September 2000	Unreleased		
FA Premier League Stars	Electronic Arts, Software Creations (PAL)	Electronic Arts	Unreleased	1999	Unreleased		
FA Premier League Stars 2001	Electronic Arts	Electronic Arts	Unreleased	2000	Unreleased		
Fade to Black	Delphine Software	Electronic Arts	May 2, 1997	July 1996	June 28, 1996	P	
Faire Games: Language Arts	Lightspan	Lightspan	Unreleased	Unreleased	1998		
Faire Games: Mathematics	Lightspan	Lightspan	Unreleased	Unreleased	1998		
Falcata	Gust	Gust	June 23, 1995	Unreleased	Unreleased		
Family Bowling •Wai Wai Bowling^{JP}	Nichibutsu	Nichibutsu	August 6, 1998	Unreleased	Unreleased		
Family Chess	Magnolia	Magnolia	March 20, 2002	Unreleased	Unreleased		
Family Card Game Fun Pack •Card Shark^{PAL} •Trump Shiyouyo!^{JP} •Trump Shiyouyo! Fukkoku-ban^{JP}	Bottom Up	Mud Duck Productions; Midas Interactive Entertainment^{PAL} Bottom Up^{JP} Pure Sound^{JP}	October 15, 1998; August 5, 1999; October 5, 2000	February 16, 2001	September 26, 2002		
Family Diamond	Magnolia	Magnolia	January 24, 2002	Unreleased	Unreleased		
Family Feud	Artech Studios	Hasbro Interactive	Unreleased	Unreleased	October 16, 2000		
Family Game Pack	The 3DO Company	The 3DO Company	Unreleased	Unreleased	March 14, 2000		
Family Games Compendium	Interactive Entertainment	Midas Interactive Entertainment	Unreleased	June 30, 2001	Unreleased		
Family Gunjin Shogi	Magnolia	Magnolia	March 20, 2002	Unreleased	Unreleased		
Family Igo 2	Magnolia	Magnolia	November 21, 2002	Unreleased	Unreleased		
Family Igo: Super Strong	Magnolia	Magnolia	January 24, 2002	Unreleased	Unreleased		
Family Mahjong 2	Magnolia	Magnolia	November 21, 2002	Unreleased	Unreleased		
Family Shogi: Super Strong	Magnolia	Magnolia	January 24, 2002	Unreleased	Unreleased		
The FamiRes	Artdink	Artdink	December 3, 1998	Unreleased	Unreleased		
FamiRes e Youkosou!	Bec	Bec	November 5, 1998	Unreleased	Unreleased		
The FamiRes: Shijou Saikyou no Menu	Human Entertainment	Human Entertainment	December 17, 1998	Unreleased	Unreleased		
Fantastep	Jaleco	Jaleco	April 25, 1997	Unreleased	Unreleased		
Fantastic Fortune	Fujitsu	CyberFront	May 24, 2001	Unreleased	Unreleased		
Fantastic Four	Probe Entertainment	Acclaim Entertainment	February 19, 1998	August 1997	September 30, 1997		
Fantastic Pinball Kyuutenkai	Technosoft	Technosoft	March 31, 1995	Unreleased	Unreleased		
Farland Saga: Toki no Michishirube	TGL	TGL	April 28, 1999	Unreleased	Unreleased		
Farland Story: Yottsu no Fuuin	TGL	TGL	November 27, 1997	Unreleased	Unreleased		
Fatal Fury: Wild Ambition	SNK	SNK	June 24, 1999	Unreleased	November 30, 1999		
Favorite Dear	NEC Interchannel	NEC Interchannel	February 25, 1999	Unreleased	Unreleased		
Favorite Dear: Enkan no Monogatari (Note: update for Favorite Dear.)	NEC Interchannel	NEC Interchannel	September 27, 2001	Unreleased	Unreleased		
Favorite Dear: Junpaku no Yogensha	NEC Interchannel	NEC Interchannel	December 7, 2000	Unreleased	Unreleased		
Fear Effect	Kronos Digital Entertainment	Eidos Interactive	Unreleased	March 17, 2000	February 24, 2000		
Fear Effect 2: Retro Helix	Kronos Digital Entertainment	Eidos Interactive	November 15, 2001	March 23, 2001	February 21, 2001		
FEDA 2: White Surge the Platoon	Max Entertainment	Yanoman	April 18, 1997	Unreleased	Unreleased		
Felony 11-79	Climax Entertainment	ASCII Entertainment	May 23, 1997	December 1997	August 31, 1997		
Fever	Ichikawa	Ichikawa	November 11, 1999	Unreleased	Unreleased		
Fever 2	ICS	ICS	May 2, 2000	Unreleased	Unreleased		
Fever 3	ICS	ICS	November 2, 2000	Unreleased	Unreleased		
Fever 4	ICS	ICS	March 8, 2001	Unreleased	Unreleased		
Fever 5	ICS	ICS	September 20, 2001	Unreleased	Unreleased		
FIFA 96	EA Canada	Electronic Arts	Unreleased	December 1995^{AU,DE,PAL}	November 22, 1995	P	
FIFA 97	EA Canada	Electronic Arts	June 20, 1997	November 16, 1996	December 13, 1996		
FIFA: Road to World Cup 98	EA Canada	Electronic Arts	Unreleased	November 28, 1996^{DE,PAL}	November 24, 1996	P	
FIFA 99	EA Canada	Electronic Arts	August 26, 1999	December 4, 1998	November 24, 1998	P	
FIFA 2000	EA Canada	Electronic Arts	Unreleased	November 5, 1996	October 26, 1999	P	
FIFA 2001	EA Canada	Electronic Arts	Unreleased	November 3, 2000	October 31, 2000	P	
FIFA 2002	EA Canada	Electronic Arts	Unreleased	November 2, 2001	November 1, 2001		
FIFA Football 2003	EA Canada	Electronic Arts	Unreleased	November 1, 2002	November 11, 2002		
FIFA Football 2004	EA Canada	Electronic Arts	Unreleased	October 24, 2003	November 4, 2003		
FIFA 2005	EA Canada	Electronic Arts	Unreleased	October 15, 2004	October 12, 2004	P	
The Fifth Element	Kalisto Entertainment	Sony Computer Entertainment^{EU}, Activision^{NA}	Unreleased	October 1, 1998	September 30, 1998		
Fighter Maker •3D Kakutou Tsukuru^{JP}	ASCII Entertainment	Agetec, ASCII Entertainment^{JP}	July 30, 1998	1999	May 31, 1999		
Fighter's Impact	Taito	Taito	April 25, 1997	Unreleased	Unreleased		
Fighting Eyes	Bandit	Solan	December 17, 1998	Unreleased	Unreleased		
Fighting Force •Metal Fist^{JP}	Core Design	Eidos Interactive	January 15, 1998	November 1997	October 31, 1997		
Fighting Force 2	Core Design	Eidos Interactive	Unreleased	December 1999	November 30, 1999		
Fighting Illusion K-1 GP 2000	Daft	Xing Entertainment	October 5, 2000	Unreleased	Unreleased		
Fighting Illusion V: K-1 Grand Prix '99	Daft	Xing Entertainment	September 30, 1999	Unreleased	Unreleased		
Fighting Network RINGS	Naxat Soft	Naxat Soft	August 7, 1997	Unreleased	Unreleased		
Final Doom (Note: stand-alone expansion for Doom.)	Williams Entertainment	Williams Entertainment^{NA}, GT Interactive^{EU}	January 25, 1998	October 2, 1997	October 1, 1996		
Final Fantasy I	Square	Square	October 31, 2002	Unreleased	Unreleased		
Final Fantasy II	Square	Square	October 31, 2002	Unreleased	Unreleased		
Final Fantasy IV	Square	Square	March 21, 1997	Unreleased	Unreleased		
Final Fantasy V	Square	Square	March 19, 1998	Unreleased	Unreleased		
Final Fantasy VI	Tose	Square^{JP}, Square Electronic Arts^{NA}, Sony Computer Entertainment^{EU}	March 11, 1999	March 1, 2002	September 30, 1999		
Final Fantasy VII	Square	Square^{JP}, Sony Computer Entertainment^{NA/EU}	January 31, 1997	November 14, 1997	September 7, 1997	P	
Final Fantasy VIII	Square	Square^{JP/EU}, Square Electronic Arts^{NA}	February 11, 1999	October 27, 1999	September 9, 1999	P	
Final Fantasy IX	Square	Square^{JP/EU}, Square Electronic Arts^{NA}	July 7, 2000	February 16, 2001	November 13, 2000	P	
Final Fantasy Tactics	Square	Square^{JP}, Sony Computer Entertainment^{NA}	June 20, 1997	Unreleased	January 28, 1998		
Final Round	Atlus	Atlus	March 12, 1998	Unreleased	Unreleased		
The Final Round •Konami Open Golf^{EU}	Konami	Konami	June 21, 1996	November 1996	August 31, 1996		
Finger Flashing	Affect	Affect	July 15, 1999	Unreleased	Unreleased		
The Firemen 2: Pete & Danny	Human Entertainment	Human Entertainment	December 22, 1995	Unreleased	Unreleased		
Fire ProWrestling G	S-Neo	Human Entertainment	June 24, 1999	Unreleased	Unreleased		
Fire Pro Wrestling: Iron Slam '96	Human Entertainment	Human Entertainment	March 15, 1996	Unreleased	Unreleased		
Firebugs	Attention to Detail	Sony Computer Entertainment	Unreleased	October 18, 2002	Unreleased		
Firestorm: ThunderHawk 2 •ThunderStrike 2^{NA}	Core Design	Core Design Victor Interactive Software^{JP}	May 24, 1996	December 4, 1995	January 15, 1996	P	
Fire Woman Matoigumi	HuneX	Tokuma Shoten	March 26, 1998	Unreleased	Unreleased		
Firo & Klawd	Interactive Studios	BMG Interactive	June 13, 1997	November 1996	Unreleased		
First Kiss Story	HuneX	Human Entertainment	April 24, 1998	Unreleased	Unreleased		
First Queen IV: Varcia Senki	Kure	Kure	December 6, 1996	Unreleased	Unreleased		
Fish On! Bass	Pony Canyon	Pony Canyon	September 22, 1999	Unreleased	Unreleased		
Fisherman's Bait: A Bass Challenge •Exciting Bass^{JP}	Konami	Konami	September 23, 1998	Unreleased	January 31, 1999		
Fisherman's Bait 2: Big Ol' Bass •Exciting Bass 2^{JP}	Konami Computer Entertainment Nagoya	Konami	September 30, 1999	Unreleased	November 24, 1999		
Fishing Club: Boat no Tsuriken	Success	Success	August 24, 2000	Unreleased	Unreleased		
Fishing Club: Bouhatei no Tsuriken	Success	Success	August 24, 2000	Unreleased	Unreleased		
Fishing Club: Hama no Tsuriken	Success	Success	August 24, 2000	Unreleased	Unreleased		
Fishing Freaks: BassRise Plus (Note: update for Bass Rise.)	Bandai	Bandai	February 3, 2000	Unreleased	Unreleased		
Fishing Koushien II	A-Wave	King Records	September 22, 1999	Unreleased	Unreleased		
FIST	Genki	Imagineer	November 22, 1996	Unreleased	Unreleased		
Flamberge no Seirei	Kid	Kid	April 27, 2000	Unreleased	Unreleased		
The Flintstones: Bedrock Bowling	Adrenalin Interactive	SouthPeak Interactive^{NA}, Ubi Soft^{EU}	Unreleased	August 18, 2000	September 19, 2000		
Floating Runner	Kokopel	THQ	January 19, 1996	1996	October 26, 1996		
Flying Squadron	Naps Team	Phoenix Games	Unreleased	2003	Unreleased		
Football Madness	Naps Team	Phoenix Games	Unreleased	March 28, 2003	Unreleased		
Ford Racing	Toolbox Design	Empire Interactive	Unreleased	February 16, 2001	March 6, 2001		
Ford Truck Mania	Alpine Studios, Inc.	Gotham Games	Unreleased	Unreleased	September 16, 2003		
Forget Me Not: Palette	Enterbrain	Enterbrain	April 26, 2001	Unreleased	Unreleased		
Formation Soccer '97: The Road To France	Human Entertainment	Human Entertainment	June 27, 1997	Unreleased	Unreleased		
Formation Soccer '98: Ganbare Nippon in France	Human Entertainment	Human Entertainment	June 4, 1998	Unreleased	Unreleased		
Formula 1	Bizarre Creations	Psygnosis	Unreleased	September 13, 1996	September 30, 1996	P	
Formula 1 98	Visual Sciences	Psygnosis	Unreleased	October 30, 1998	November 30, 1998		
Formula 1: Championship Edition •Formula 1 97^{EU,JP}	Bizarre Creations	Psygnosis	January 15, 1998	September 26, 1997	September 15, 1997	P	
Formula Circus	Nichibutsu	Nichibutsu	May 2, 1997	Unreleased	Unreleased		
Formula GP	Kung Fu Games	Midas Interactive	Unreleased	February 21, 2003	Unreleased		
Formula Grand Prix: Team Unei Simulation 2 - 1997 Han	Tomcat System	Coconuts Japan	December 25, 1997	Unreleased	Unreleased		
Formula Karts Special Edition	Manic Media Productions	Telstar Electronic Studios	Unreleased	November 21, 1997	Unreleased		
Formula Nippon '99; Formula Nippon^{PAL}	TYO	TYO^{JP} EON^{PAL}	September 9, 1999	2000	Unreleased		
Formula One 99	Studio 33	Psygnosis/Sony Computer Entertainment	October 21, 1999	October 20, 1999	October 31, 1999		
Formula One 2000	Studio 33	Sony Computer Entertainment	Unreleased	October 6, 2000	October 4, 2000		
Formula One 2001	Studio 33	Sony Computer Entertainment	Unreleased	May 24, 2001	Unreleased	P	
Formula One Arcade	Studio 33	Sony Computer Entertainment	Unreleased	July 19, 2001	Unreleased		
Forsaken	Probe Entertainment	Acclaim Entertainment	Unreleased	April 1998^{BE} April 1998^{FR} April 1998^{NL} April 1998^{PAL}	April 30, 1998		
Fox Hunt	3Vision Games	Capcom	Unreleased	Unreleased	September 30, 1996		
Fox Junction	Trips	Trips	April 29, 1998	Unreleased	Unreleased		
FoxKids.com Micro Maniacs Racing •Denkou Sekka Micro Runner^{JP} •Micro Maniacs^{PAL}	Codemasters	Codemasters	November 2, 2000	October 30, 2000	August 15, 2000		
Fox Sports Soccer '99	Gremlin Interactive	Fox Interactive	Unreleased	Unreleased	June 30, 1998		
Frank Thomas Big Hurt Baseball	Iguana Entertainment	Acclaim Entertainment	September 13, 1996	October 1996	June 5, 1996		
Freestyle Boardin' '99 •Phat Air: Extreme Snowboarding^{PAL} •Zap! Snowboarding Trix '98^{JP}	Atelier Double	Capcom, Funsoft^{PAL}, Pony Canyon^{JP}	December 25, 1997	August 1998	February 28, 1999		
Freestyle Motocross: McGrath vs. Pastrana	Z-Axis	Acclaim Entertainment	Unreleased	December 8, 2000	November 5, 2000		
Free Talk Studio	Media Entertainment	Media Entertainment	September 25, 1997	Unreleased	Unreleased		
Frenzy!	Sales Curve Interactive	Sales Curve Interactive	Unreleased	June 1998	Unreleased		
Frisky Tom	Nichibutsu	Hamster Corporation	July 25, 2002	Unreleased	Unreleased		
Frogger	Sony Computer Entertainment Europe	Hasbro Interactive	May 28, 1998	November 1997	September 30, 1997		
Frogger 2: Swampy's Revenge	Blitz Games	Hasbro Interactive	Unreleased	October 13, 2000	October 10, 2000		
From TV Animation - One Piece: Grand Battle!	Ganbarion	Bandai	March 15, 2001	2003	Unreleased		
From TV Animation - One Piece: Grand Battle! 2	Ganbarion	Bandai	March 20, 2002	Unreleased	Unreleased		
Front Mission 1st	Square	Square	October 23, 2003	Unreleased	Unreleased		
Front Mission 2	Square	Square	September 25, 1997	Unreleased	Unreleased		
Front Mission 3	Square	Square^{JP/EU}, Square Electronic Arts^{NA}	September 2, 1999	August 11, 2000	February 29, 2000		
Front Mission: Alternative	Square	Square	December 18, 1997	Unreleased	Unreleased		
Fun! Fun! Pingu	Sony Music Entertainment Japan	Sony Music Entertainment Japan	November 18, 1999	Unreleased	Unreleased		
Furimukeba Tonari Ni	Zero System	Zero System	April 26, 2001	Unreleased	Unreleased		
Fushigi Deka	Capcom	Capcom	October 26, 2000	Unreleased	Unreleased		
Fushigi no Kuni no Angelique	Koei	Koei	February 28, 1997	Unreleased	Unreleased		
Future Cop: LAPD	Electronic Arts	Electronic Arts	August 5, 1999	September 28, 1998	August 31, 1998		
Future Racer^{PAL} •Defeat Lightning^{JP}	D Cruise	Midas Interactive^{PAL}, D Cruise^{JP}	May 23, 1997	April 12, 2002	Unreleased		
Fuuraiki	Fog	Fog	January 18, 2001	Unreleased	Unreleased		
Fuuun Gokuu Ninden	Aicom	Aicom	August 30, 1996	Unreleased	Unreleased		
G-Darius	Taito	Taito^{JP}, THQ^{NA/EU}	April 9, 1998	1998	September 30, 1998		
G-O-D Pure: Growth or Devolution	Infinity	Imagineer	February 26, 1998	Unreleased	Unreleased		
G-Police	Psygnosis	Psygnosis	November 19, 1998	October 15, 1997	September 30, 1997	P	
G-Police: Weapons of Justice	Psygnosis	Psygnosis	Unreleased	September 3, 1999	August 31, 1999		
G1 Jockey	Koei	Koei	March 11, 1999	Unreleased	Unreleased		
G1 Jockey 2000	Koei	Koei	February 3, 2000	Unreleased	Unreleased		
Gaball Screen	System Sacom	Antinos Records	December 6, 1996	Unreleased	Unreleased		
Gadget: Past as Future	Synergy Inc.	Synergy Inc.	November 27, 1997	Unreleased	Unreleased		
Gaia Master	Nexus Interact	Capcom	April 13, 2000	Unreleased	Unreleased		
GaiaSeed: Project Seed Trap	Techno Soleil	Techno Soleil	December 13, 1996	Unreleased	Unreleased		
Gakkou Deatta Kowai Hanashi S	Pandora Box	Banpresto	July 19, 1996	Unreleased	Unreleased		
Gakkou no Kowai Uwasa: Hanako-san ga Kita!!	Capcom	Capcom	August 11, 1995	Unreleased	Unreleased		
Gakkou o Tsukurou!!	Refine Textile	Victor Interactive Software	December 18, 1997	Unreleased	Unreleased		
Gakkou o Tsukurou!! 2	Groove Box Japan	Victor Interactive Software	December 10, 1998	Unreleased	Unreleased		
Gakkou o Tsukurou!! Kouchou Sensei Monogatari	Groove Box Japan	Victor Interactive Software	October 26, 1998	Unreleased	Unreleased		
Gakuen Sentai Solblast	Caravan	Creative Heads	February 4, 1999	Unreleased	Unreleased		
Galaga: Destination Earth	King of the Jungle	Hasbro Interactive	Unreleased	September 23, 2000	October 22, 2000		
Galaxian^{3}	High-Tech Lab Japan	Namco^{JP}, Sony Computer Entertainment^{EU}	April 26, 1996	April 26, 1996	Unreleased		
Galaxy Fight: Universal Warriors^{JP} •Galaxy Fight^{PAL}	Sunsoft	Sunsoft	May 3, 1996	April 30, 1996	Unreleased		
Gale Gunner	ASCII	ASCII	February 24, 2000	Unreleased	Unreleased		
Galeoz	Pre Stage	Atlus	December 20, 1996	Unreleased	Unreleased		
Galerians	Polygon Magic	ASCII Entertainment^{JP}, Crave Entertainment^{PAL,NA}	August 26, 1999	April 15, 2000	March 29, 2000		
Gallop Racer	Tecmo	Tecmo	September 27, 1996	Unreleased	Unreleased		
Gallop Racer 2: The One and Only Road to Victory	Tecmo	Tecmo	November 20, 1997	Unreleased	Unreleased		
Gallop Racer 3: The One and Only Road to Victory^{JP} •Gallop Racer^{NA}	Tecmo	Tecmo	March 18, 1999	Unreleased	March 17, 1999		
Gallop Racer 2000	Tecmo	Tecmo	February 17, 2000	Unreleased	Unreleased		
Gambler Jiko Chuushinha: Ippatsu Shoubu!	Game Arts	ESP Software	June 22, 2000	Unreleased	Unreleased		
Game de Seishun	Kid	Kid	April 23, 1998	Unreleased	Unreleased		
Game de wa Jimeru TOEIC Test Mazuha Nyuumonhen1500	Graphic Research	Nagase Brothers	June 5, 2003	Unreleased	Unreleased		
The Game Maker: Ureure 100 Manpon Gettodaze!	Kuusou Kagaku	Axela	September 23, 1997	Unreleased	Unreleased		
Game Nihonshi: Kakumeiji Oda Nobunaga	Koei	Koei	April 11, 1997	Unreleased	Unreleased		
Game no Tatsujin	Affect	Sunsoft	June 9, 1995	Unreleased	Unreleased		
Game no Tatsujin 2	Chat Noir	Sunsoft	January 10, 1997	Unreleased	Unreleased		
Game no Tatsujin: The Shanghai	Activision	Sunsoft	October 13, 1995	Unreleased	Unreleased		
The Game of Life	The Collective	Hasbro Interactive	Unreleased	Unreleased	September 30, 1998		
Game Soft o Tsukurou	Imagineer	Imagineer	January 28, 1999	Unreleased	Unreleased		
Gamera 2000	Surveyor Corp	Virgin Interactive Entertainment	April 25, 1997	Unreleased	Unreleased		
Ganba no Bouken: The Puzzle Action	Ooparts	Bandai	April 3, 2003	Unreleased	Unreleased		
Ganbare Goemon: Kuru Nara Koi! Ayashige Ikka no Kuroi Kage	Konami Computer Entertainment Nagoya	Konami	December 23, 1998	Unreleased	Unreleased		
Ganbare Goemon: Ōedo Daikaiten	Konami Computer Entertainment Kobe/Now Production	Konami	March 29, 2001	Unreleased	Unreleased		
Ganbare Goemon: Uchū Kaizoku Akogingu	Konami	Konami	March 22, 1996	Unreleased	Unreleased		
Gangway Monsters	SCEI	SCEI	October 15, 1998	Unreleased	Unreleased		
Ganso! Doubutsu Uranai / Renai Uranai Puzzle	Culture Brain	Culture Brain	June 30, 2001	Unreleased	Unreleased		
Ganso Family Mahjong	Nichibutsu	Nichibutsu	May 7, 1998	Unreleased	Unreleased		
Ganso Family Mahjong 2	Nichibutsu	Nichibutsu	June 3, 1999	Unreleased	Unreleased		
GateKeepers	Kadokawa	Kadokawa	December 16, 1999	Unreleased	Unreleased		
Gauntlet Legends	Midway Games	Midway Games	Unreleased	June 28, 2000	February 29, 2000		
Gear Senshi Dendoh	Natsume Co., Ltd.	Bandai	April 26, 2001	Unreleased	Unreleased		
Gegege no Kitarō: Gyakushuu! Youkai Daichisen	Konami	Konami	December 11, 2003	Unreleased	Unreleased		
Gegege no Kitarō: Noroi no Nikuto Katachi Tachi	Bandai	Bandai	January 24, 1997	Unreleased	Unreleased		
Gekido •Gekido: Urban Fighters^{PAL}	Naps Team	Infogrames	Unreleased	2000	May 18, 2000		
Gekioh: Shooting King	Warashi	Natsume Inc.	May 20, 1999	February 2004	December 17, 2002		
Gekiretsu Pachinkazu	Planning Office Wada	Planning Office Wada	February 21, 1997	Unreleased	Unreleased		
Gekisou TomaRunner	SCEI	SCEI	July 22, 1999	Unreleased	Unreleased		
Gekitotsu Toma L'Arc: Tomarunner vs L'Arc-en-Ciel	SCEI	SCEI	July 19, 2000	Unreleased	Unreleased		
Gekitou! Crush Gear Turbo	Bandai	Bandai	July 25, 2002	Unreleased	Unreleased		
Gekka Ni no Kishi: O Ryusen	Banpresto	Banpresto	September 13, 1996	Unreleased	Unreleased		
Genei Tougi: Shadow Struggle	Racdym	Banpresto	September 20, 1996	Unreleased	Unreleased		
Genghis Khan: Aoki Ookami to Shiroki Mejika IV	Koei	Koei	February 25, 1999	Unreleased	Unreleased		
Gensō Suikogaiden Vol. 1: Harmonia no Kenshi	KCET	Konami	September 21, 2000	Unreleased	Unreleased		
Gensō Suikogaiden Vol. 2: Crystal Valley no Kettou	Konami	Konami	March 22, 2001	Unreleased	Unreleased		
Gensou Maden Saiyuuki: Harukanaru Nishi e	J-Wing	J-Wing	December 26, 2002	Unreleased	Unreleased		
Gensou no Artemis: Actress School Mystery Adventure	Shoeisha	Shoeisha	January 27, 2000	Unreleased	Unreleased		
Geom Cube	Technos Japan	^{JP} Technos Japan, ^{NA} Technos	December 22, 1994	Unreleased	December 10, 1995		
Geometry Duel	Takara	Takara	October 29, 1998	Unreleased	Unreleased		
Germs	KAJ	KAJ	July 22, 1999	Unreleased	Unreleased		
GetBackers Dakkanya	Konami	Konami	July 26, 2001	Unreleased	Unreleased		
Getter Robo Daikessen!	TechnoSoft	Bandai	September 9, 1999	Unreleased	Unreleased		
Gex	Crystal Dynamics	Crystal Dynamics	March 8, 1996	April 1996	December 13, 1995		
Gex: Enter the Gecko •Gex 3D: Enter the Gecko^{UK} •Gex 3D: Return of the Gecko^{PAL} •SpinTail^{JP}	Crystal Dynamics	Midway Games^{NA}, Crystal Dynamics^{PAL}	Unreleased	April 3, 1998	February 24, 1998		
Gex 3: Deep Cover Gecko •Gex: Deep Cover Gecko^{PAL}	Crystal Dynamics	Eidos Interactive	Unreleased	April 10, 1999	March 23, 1999		
Ghost in the Shell	Exact Co., Ltd.	THQ^{NA}, Sony Computer Entertainment	July 17, 1997	July 1998	November 1, 1997		
Ghoul Panic	Eighting/Raizing	Namco^{JP}, Sony Computer Entertainment^{PAL}	April 20, 2000	April 2000	Unreleased		
Ginga Eiyuu Densetsu	Microvision	Tokuma Shoten	May 28, 1998	Unreleased	Unreleased		
Ginga Ojousama Densetsu Yuna: Final Edition	Hudson Soft	Hudson Soft	June 25, 1998	Unreleased	Unreleased		
Gionbana	Nichibutsu	Nichibutsu	December 15, 1995	Unreleased	Unreleased		
Gionbana 2	Nichibutsu	Nichibutsu	February 4, 1999	Unreleased	Unreleased		
Glint Glitters	Konami	Konami	July 20, 1999	Unreleased	Unreleased		
Global Domination	Psygnosis	Psygnosis	Unreleased	1999	Unreleased		
Global Force: Shin Sentou Kokka	Marionette	Sony Computer Entertainment	March 11, 1999	Unreleased	Unreleased		
Glocal Hexcite	Soliton	Locus	December 22, 1999	Unreleased	Unreleased		
Glover	Interactive Studios Ltd.	Hasbro Interactive	Unreleased	October 4, 1999	September 19, 1999		
Goal Storm •World Soccer: Winning Eleven^{JP}	Konami	Konami	March 15, 1996	January 15, 1996	December 22, 1995		
Goal Storm '97 •International Superstar Soccer Pro^{EU} •World Soccer Winning Eleven '97^{JP}	Konami	Konami	June 5, 1997	April 15, 1997	April 15, 1997	P	
Gochachiru	Pandora Box	Pandora Box	October 19, 2000	Unreleased	Unreleased		
Godzilla Trading Battle	Toho	Toho	December 3, 1998	Unreleased	Unreleased		
Goemon: Shin Sedai Shūmei!	Konami	Konami	December 20, 2001	Unreleased	Unreleased		
Go II Professional Taikyogu Igo	Mycom	Mycom	December 27, 1996	Unreleased	Unreleased		
Go-Jin Senki	Santa Entertainment	Tonkin House	August 6, 1998	Unreleased	Unreleased		
GoGo I-land	Kid	Kid	December 14, 2000	Unreleased	Unreleased		
Goiken Muyou II	Mediamuse	KSS	October 29, 1998	Unreleased	Unreleased		
Gokujou Parodius Da! Deluxe Pack •Parodius^{PAL}	KCET	Konami	December 3, 1994	March 15, 1996	Unreleased		
Gokuu Densetsu: Magic Beast Warriors	Allumer	Allumer	May 26, 1995	Unreleased	Unreleased		
Gold and Glory: The Road to El Dorado	Revolution Software	Ubi Soft	Unreleased	Unreleased	December 20, 2000		
Golden Nugget	Point of View, Inc.	Virgin Interactive Entertainment	Unreleased	Unreleased	October 21, 1997		
Goldie	The Code Monkeys	Midas Interactive Entertainment	Unreleased	September 1, 2000	Unreleased		
Goo! Goo! Soundy	Konami	Konami	September 22, 1999	Unreleased	Unreleased		
Goofy's Fun House •Dingo une Journée de Dingue^{FR}	The Code Monkeys	NewKidCo^{NA}, Ubi Soft^{EU}	Unreleased	December 7, 2001	July 2001		
Googootrops	Produce	Enix	January 28, 1999	Unreleased	Unreleased		
Goryujin + Electro	Produce	Enix	October 29, 1998	Unreleased	Unreleased		
Gotha II: Tenkuu no Kishi	Micronet co., Ltd.	Koei	July 12, 1996	Unreleased	Unreleased		
Gotouchi Hello Kitty Sugoroku Monogatari	Bandai	Bandai	June 19, 2003	Unreleased	Unreleased		
Gouketuji Ichizoku 2: Chottodake Saikyou Densetsu	Atlus	Atlus	October 20, 1995	Unreleased	Unreleased		
Gourmet Action Game: Manpuku!! Nabe Kazoku	Media Entertainment	Media Entertainment	January 31, 2002	Unreleased	Unreleased		
GP Challenge	Midas Interactive	Midas Interactive	Unreleased	April 12, 2002	Unreleased		
Gradius Deluxe Pack	KCET	Konami	March 29, 1996	Unreleased	Unreleased		
Gradius Gaiden	KCET	Konami	August 28, 1997	Unreleased	Unreleased		
Gran Turismo	Polyphony Digital	Sony Computer Entertainment	December 23, 1997	May 8, 1998	May 12, 1998	P	
Gran Turismo 2	Polyphony Digital	Sony Computer Entertainment	December 11, 1999	January 28, 2000	December 16, 1999	P	
Grand Slam	Burst Studios	Virgin Interactive Entertainment	Unreleased	Unreleased	April 10, 1997		
Grand Theft Auto	DMA Design	BMG Interactive, ASC Games	April 27, 1999	December 12, 1997	June 30, 1998	P	
Grand Theft Auto 2	DMA Design	Rockstar Games	Unreleased	October 22, 1999	November 10, 1999		
Grand Theft Auto: London 1969 (Note: stand-alone expansion for Grand Theft Auto.)	Rockstar Canada	Rockstar Games	Unreleased	April 29, 1999	April 2, 1999		
Grandia	Game Arts	Entertainment Software Publishing^{JP}, Sony Computer Entertainment^{NA}, Ubi Soft^{EU}	June 24, 1999	March 31, 2000	October 26, 1999		
Granyuu-shima! Daibouken	Shuwa System	Shuwa System	October 15, 1998	Unreleased	Unreleased		
The Granstream Saga •Granstream Denki: The Granstream Saga^{JP}	Shade	Sony Computer Entertainment^{JP}, THQ^{NA}, ARC Entertainment^{PAL}	November 6, 1997	February 26, 1999	June 30, 1998		
The Great Battle VI	Aspect	Banpresto	April 11, 1997	Unreleased	Unreleased		
Great Hits	Enix Corporation	Enix Corporation	October 29, 1998	Unreleased	Unreleased		
Grid Runner •Grid Run^{PAL}	Radical Entertainment	Virgin Interactive Entertainment	Unreleased	June 1997	October 15, 1996		
Grille Logic	Shoeisha	Shoeisha	January 26, 1996	Unreleased	Unreleased		
The Grinch	Artificial Mind and Movement	Konami	Unreleased	December 8, 2000	October 26, 2000		
Grind Session	Shaba Games	Sony Computer Entertainment	Unreleased	August 25, 2000	May 23, 2000		
Gritz: The Primordial Adventure	Sanyo	Sanyo	May 30, 1997	Unreleased	Unreleased		
Groove Adventure Rave: Mikan no Hiseki	WinkySoft	Konami	August 29, 2002	Unreleased	Unreleased		
Groove Adventure Rave: Plue no Daibouken	Aspect	Konami	July 25, 2002	Unreleased	Unreleased		
Groove Adventure Rave: Yuukyuu no Kizuna	Konami	Konami	January 31, 2002	Unreleased	Unreleased		
Growlanser	Career Soft	Atlus	November 25, 1999	Unreleased	Unreleased		
Grudge Warriors	Tempest Software	Take-Two Interactive	Unreleased	Unreleased	May 3, 2000		
GT Kai: All Japan Grand Touring Car Championship	Kaneko	Kaneko	February 23, 1996	Unreleased	Unreleased		
GT Max Rev.: All Japan Grand Touring Car Championship	Kaneko	Kaneko	February 28, 1997	Unreleased	Unreleased		
GT Straight Victory: Hoshino Kazuyoshi e no Chousen	Polygon Magic	Calsonic	April 23, 1998	Unreleased	Unreleased		
The Guardian of Darkness	Cryo Interactive	Cryo Interactive	Unreleased	1999	Unreleased		
Guardian Recall	Tsuji Jimusho	Xing	October 1, 1998	Unreleased	Unreleased		
Guardian's Crusade	Tamsoft	Tamsoft^{JP}, Activision^{PAL,NA}	September 23, 1998	March 29, 1999	March 1, 1999		
Gubble	Mad Duck Productions	Mad Duck Productions, Midas Interactive Entertainment	September 17, 1998	April 12, 2001	June 15, 2002		
Guilty Gear	Arc System Works	Atlus	May 14, 1998	May 19, 2000	November 12, 1998		
Guitar Freaks	Konami	Konami	July 29, 1999	Unreleased	Unreleased		
Guitar Freaks Append 2nd Mix (Note: expansion for Guitar Freaks.)	Konami	Konami	February 24, 2000	Unreleased	Unreleased		
GunBare! Game Tengoku 2	Jaleco Entertainment	Jaleco Entertainment	March 19, 1998	Unreleased	Unreleased		
Gundam 0079: The War for Earth	Presto Studios	Bandai	May 2, 1997	Unreleased	Unreleased		
Gundam: Battle Assault; Gundam: The Battle Master 2^{JP}	Natsume Co., Ltd.	Bandai	March 12, 1998	December 7, 2001	November 6, 2000		
Gundam: Battle Assault 2 Simple Characters 2000 Series Vol. 12: Mobile Fighter G Gundam - The Battle^{JP} Simple Characters 2000 Series Vol. 13: New Mobile Report Gundam Wing - The Battle^{JP}	Natsume Co., Ltd.	Bandai	October 10, 2002	November 29, 2002	July 18, 2002		
Gundam: The Battle Master	Natsume Co., Ltd.	Bandai	June 22, 1997	Unreleased	Unreleased		
GunDress	Starfish	Starfish	February 24, 2000	Unreleased	Unreleased		
Gunfighter: The Legend of Jesse James	Rebellion Developments	Ubi Soft	Unreleased	December 7, 2001	November 18, 2001		
Gung Ho Brigade	Tomy Corporation	Tomy Corporation	October 19, 2000	Unreleased	Unreleased		
Gungage	KCET	Konami	June 3, 1999	September 24, 1999	Unreleased		
Gunnm: Martian Memory	Yukito Products	Banpresto	August 27, 1998	Unreleased	Unreleased		
Gunparade March	Alfa System	SCEI	September 28, 2000	Unreleased	Unreleased		
Gunpey	Tose	Bandai	December 16, 1999	Unreleased	Unreleased		
Gunship	MicroProse	MicroProse	Unreleased	June 1996	July 3, 1996		
Guntu Western Front June, 1944	Electrocoin Japan Co., Ltd.	Electrocoin Japan Co., Ltd.	November 27, 1997	Unreleased	Unreleased		
Guruguru Town Hanamarukun	Atlus	Atlus	December 14, 2000	Unreleased	Unreleased		
Gussun Oyoyo	Xing Entertainment	Xing Entertainment	April 28, 1995	Unreleased	Unreleased		
Gute Zeiten Schlechte Zeiten Quiz	Software 2000	Software 2000	Unreleased	June 21, 2000	Unreleased		
Gute Zeiten Schlechte Zeiten Vol.2	Software 2000	Software 2000	Unreleased	June 21, 2000	Unreleased		
Gute Zeiten Schlechte Zeiten Vol.3	Software 2000	Software 2000	Unreleased	December 27, 2000	Unreleased		
Guucho de Park: Theme Park Monogatari	Make	Electronic Arts Victor	December 13, 1996	Unreleased	Unreleased		
Hai-Shin 2	Aques	Aques	March 26, 1998	Unreleased	Unreleased		
Hajime no Ippo: The Fighting!	Kodansha	Kodansha	July 31, 1997	Unreleased	Unreleased		
Hakai Ou: King of Crusher	FAB Communications	FAB Communications	November 12, 1998	Unreleased	Unreleased		
Hamster Club i	Jorudan	Jorudan	February 28, 2002	Unreleased	Unreleased		
Hamster Monogatari	Culture Brain	Culture Brain	December 21, 2000	Unreleased	Unreleased		
Hamster no Odaken	Shimada Kikaku	Kaga Tech	February 22, 2001	Unreleased	Unreleased		
Hana to Ryuu	I'Max	I'Max	August 13, 1998	Unreleased	Unreleased		
Hanabi Fantast	Magical Company	Magical Company	July 16, 1998	Unreleased	Unreleased		
Hanafuda	Selen	Selen	January 24, 2002	Unreleased	Unreleased		
Hanafuda (Hyper Value 2800)	Konami	Konami	January 13, 2000	Unreleased	Unreleased		
Hanafuda & Card Game	Yuki	DigiCube	January 24, 2002	Unreleased	Unreleased		
Hanafuda Graffiti: Koi Koi Monogatari	I'Max	I'Max	May 10, 1996	Unreleased	Unreleased		
Hanafuda II	Success	Success	October 28, 1999	Unreleased	Unreleased		
Hanafuda Real 3D	Pony Canyon	Pony Canyon	December 10, 1998	Unreleased	Unreleased		
Happy Diet	Twilight Express	Twilight Express	April 26, 2001	Unreleased	Unreleased		
Happy Hotel	Tohoku Shinsha	Tohoku Shinsha	November 27, 1997	Unreleased	Unreleased		
Happy Jogging in Hawaii	Twilight Express	Twilight Express	November 29, 2001	Unreleased	Unreleased		
Happy Salvage	Media Works	Media Works	August 31, 2000	Unreleased	Unreleased		
Hardball '99	Mindspan	Accolade	Unreleased	Unreleased	October 15, 1998		
HardBall 5	SPS	SPS^{JP}, Accolade^{NA}	December 13, 1996	Unreleased	April 15, 1996		
Hard Blow	Electronic Arts Victor	Electronic Arts Victor	July 31, 1997	Unreleased	Unreleased		
Hard Boiled	Cryo Interactive, Sieg	Cryo Interactive, Sieg	July 30, 1998	October 1997	Unreleased		
Hard Rock Cab	Asmik Ace	Asmik Ace	February 16, 1996	Unreleased	Unreleased		
Harlem Beat: You're the One	Konami	Konami	October 28, 1999	Unreleased	Unreleased		
Harmful Park	Sky Think Systems	Sky Think Systems	February 14, 1997	Unreleased	Unreleased		
Harry Potter and the Chamber of Secrets	Argonaut Games	Electronic Arts	November 23, 2002	November 15, 2002	November 15, 2002		
Harry Potter and the Sorcerer's Stone •Harry Potter and the Philosopher's Stone^{JP,PAL}	Argonaut Games	Electronic Arts	December 1, 2001	November 16, 2001	November 16, 2001		
Harukanaru Toki no Naka De	Koei	Koei	April 6, 2000	Unreleased	Unreleased		
Harukanaru Toki no Naka de: Banjyou Yuugi	Koei	Koei	June 26, 2003	Unreleased	Unreleased		
Harukaze Sentai V-Force	Ving	Ving	November 15, 1996	Unreleased	Unreleased		
Harvest Moon: Back To Nature	Victor Interactive Software	Victor Interactive Software^{JP}, Natsume Inc.^{NA/EU}	December 16, 1999	January 26, 2001	November 17, 2000		
Hashiriya: Ookami Tachi no Densetsu	Nichibutsu	Nichibutsu	April 18, 1997	Unreleased	Unreleased		
Hatsukoi Valentine	Fill-in-Cafe	Family Soft	July 31, 1997	Unreleased	Unreleased		
Hatsukoi Valentine Special	Family Soft	Family Soft	November 5, 1998	Unreleased	Unreleased		
Haunted Junction: Seitokai Badge wo Oe!	MediaWorks	MediaWorks	January 17, 1997	Unreleased	Unreleased		
HBO Boxing	Osiris Studios	Acclaim Entertainment	Unreleased	February 16, 2001	November 20, 2000		
Heart of Darkness	Amazing Studio	Infogrames Multimedia^{EU}, Interplay Productions^{NA}	Unreleased	July 1998	July 31, 1998	P	
Heaven's Gate •Yusha: Heaven's Gate^{PAL}	Atlus	Atlus, JVC Music Europe	December 13, 1996	October 1997	Unreleased		
Hebereke's Popoitto^{PAL} •Hebereke Station Popoitto^{JP}	Sunsoft	Sunsoft	May 26, 1995	March 1, 1996	Unreleased		
Hei-Sek-Ki-In	Success	GameBank	December 18, 1997	Unreleased	Unreleased		
Heisa Byouin	Visit	Visit	April 20, 2000	Unreleased	Unreleased		
The Heiwa Otenki Studio	Aqua Rouge	Aqua Rouge	March 29, 2001	Unreleased	Unreleased		
Heiwa Pachinko Graffiti Vol. 1	Aqua Rouge	Aqua Rouge	December 9, 1999	Unreleased	Unreleased		
Heiwa Pachinko Graffiti Vol. 2	Aqua Rouge	Aqua Rouge	December 9, 1999	Unreleased	Unreleased		
Heiwa Parlor! Pro: BunDoriKing Special	Namco	Namco	December 27, 2001	Unreleased	Unreleased		
Heiwa Parlor! Pro: Dolphin Ring Special	Telenet	Nippon Telenet	March 30, 2000	Unreleased	Unreleased		
Heiwa Parlor! Pro: Fujiko Nio-ma-ka-se Special	Mitsui Bussan	Mitsui Bussan	December 28, 2000	Unreleased	Unreleased		
Heiwa Parlor! Pro: Inkappe Taishou Special	Telenet	Nippon Telenet	August 10, 2000	Unreleased	Unreleased		
Heiwa Parlor! Pro: Lupin Sansei Special	Telenet	Nippon Telenet	January 13, 2000	Unreleased	Unreleased		
Heiwa Parlor! Pro: Tsunatori Monogatari Special	Telenet	Nippon Telenet	March 7, 2002	Unreleased	Unreleased		
Heiwa Parlor! Pro: Western Special	Telenet	Nippon Telenet	February 3, 2000	Unreleased	Unreleased		
Hellboy: Asylum Seeker	Hoplite Research	DreamCatcher Interactive	Unreleased	Unreleased	August 7, 2003		
Hellnight •Dark Messiah^{JP}	Atlus Co.	Atlus Co., Konami	June 11, 1998	December 30, 1999	Unreleased		
Hello Kitty Block Kuzushi	Tamsoft	D3Publisher	October 25, 2001	Unreleased	Unreleased		
Hello Kitty Bowling	Tamsoft	D3Publisher	August 30, 2001	Unreleased	Unreleased		
Hello Kitty's Cube Frenzy •Hello Kitty: Cube de Cute^{JP}	Culture Publishers	Culture Publishers^{JP}, NewKidCo^{NA}	June 25, 1998	Unreleased	March 30, 1999		
Hello Kitty Illust Puzzle	Tamsoft	D3Publisher	August 30, 2001	Unreleased	Unreleased		
Hello Kitty no Oshaberi ABC	Atlus	Atlus	October 11, 2001	Unreleased	Unreleased		
Hello Kitty no Oshaberi Town	Atlus	Atlus	December 14, 2000	Unreleased	Unreleased		
Hello Kitty no Uchi Nioi Deyo	Bandai	Bandai	July 18, 2002	Unreleased	Unreleased		
Hello Kitty to Album Nikki o Tsukuri Masho!	Banpresto	Banpresto	March 27, 2003	Unreleased	Unreleased		
Hello Kitty Trump	Tamsoft	D3Publisher	October 25, 2001	Unreleased	Unreleased		
Hello Kitty: White Present	Hudson Soft	Hudson Soft	December 17, 1998	Unreleased	Unreleased		
Herc's Adventures	LucasArts	LucasArts	June 25, 1998	December 1997	July 31, 1997		
Herkules	The Code Monkeys	Phoenix Games	Unreleased	2003	Unreleased		
Hermie Hopperhead: Scrap Panic	SCEI	SCEI	September 29, 1995	Unreleased	Unreleased		
Heroine Dream	Map Japan	Map Japan	October 10, 1996	Unreleased	Unreleased		
Heroine Dream 2	Map Japan	Map Japan	June 18, 1998	Unreleased	Unreleased		
Hexamoon Guardians	Increment-P	Increment-P	March 30, 2000	Unreleased	Unreleased		
HeXen	Raven Software	GT Interactive, GameBank	March 19, 1998	March 21, 1997	June 30, 1997		
Hi-Hou-Ou: Mou Omae Tobakuchi Kikan!!	Lay-Up	Lay-Up	April 25, 1997	Unreleased	Unreleased		
Hi-Octane	Bullfrog Productions	Electronic Arts	January 13, 1996	December 1995	December 1, 1995		
Hidden & Dangerous	Illusion Softworks	Take-Two Interactive	Unreleased	November 23, 2001	Unreleased		
High Heat Baseball 2000	Team .366	The 3DO Company	Unreleased	Unreleased	May 12, 1999		
High Heat Major League Baseball 2002	The 3DO Company	The 3DO Company	Unreleased	Unreleased	March 14, 2001		
Highschool Kimengumi: The Table Hockey	Break	Bandai	December 20, 2001	Unreleased	Unreleased		
High School of Blitz	Japan Media Programming	MediaWorks	November 25, 1999	Unreleased	Unreleased		
Hikari no Shima: Seven Lithographs in Shining Island	Affect	Affect	November 11, 1999	Unreleased	Unreleased		
Hikaru no Go: Heian Gensou Ibunroku	KCEJ	Konami	May 30, 2002	Unreleased	Unreleased		
Hikaru no Go: Insei Choujou Kessen	Tenky	Konami	December 19, 2002	Unreleased	Unreleased		
Himiko-Den Renge	Chime	Hakuhodo	March 11, 1999	Unreleased	Unreleased		
Himitsu Kessha Q	Right Stuff	Right Stuff	July 30, 1998	Unreleased	Unreleased		
Himitsu Sentai Metamor V Deluxe	Feycraft	Mycom	October 15, 1998	Unreleased	Unreleased		
Hissatsu Pachi-Slot Station	SunSoft	SunSoft	August 20, 1998	Unreleased	Unreleased		
Hissatsu Pachi-Slot Station 2	SunSoft	SunSoft	September 28, 1998	Unreleased	Unreleased		
Hissatsu Pachi-Slot Station 3	SunSoft	SunSoft	March 4, 2000	Unreleased	Unreleased		
Hissatsu Pachi-Slot Station 4	SunSoft	SunSoft	July 27, 2000	Unreleased	Unreleased		
Hissatsu Pachi-Slot Station 5	SunSoft	SunSoft	November 16, 2000	Unreleased	Unreleased		
Hissatsu Pachi-Slot Station SP	SunSoft	SunSoft	December 16, 1999	Unreleased	Unreleased		
Hissatsu Pachi-Slot Station SP 2	SunSoft	SunSoft	September 14, 2000	Unreleased	Unreleased		
Hissatsu Pachi-Slot Station SP 3	SunSoft	SunSoft	January 1, 2002	Unreleased	Unreleased		
Hissatsu Pachinko Station	SunSoft	SunSoft	September 13, 1996	Unreleased	Unreleased		
Hissatsu Pachinko Station 2	SunSoft	SunSoft	December 25, 1997	Unreleased	Unreleased		
Hissatsu Pachinko Station 3	SunSoft	SunSoft	December 17, 1998	Unreleased	Unreleased		
Hissatsu Pachinko Station 4	SunSoft	SunSoft	March 11, 1999	Unreleased	Unreleased		
Hissatsu Pachinko Station 5	SunSoft	SunSoft	June 10, 1999	Unreleased	Unreleased		
Hissatsu Pachinko Station 6	SunSoft	SunSoft	July 1, 1999	Unreleased	Unreleased		
Hissatsu Pachinko Station 7	SunSoft	SunSoft	November 25, 1999	Unreleased	Unreleased		
Hissatsu Pachinko Station 8	SunSoft	SunSoft	March 30, 2000	Unreleased	Unreleased		
Hissatsu Pachinko Station 9	SunSoft	SunSoft	June 8, 2000	Unreleased	Unreleased		
Hissatsu Pachinko Station 10	SunSoft	SunSoft	October 19, 2000	Unreleased	Unreleased		
Hissatsu Pachinko Station Now	SunSoft	SunSoft	September 30, 1999	Unreleased	Unreleased		
Hissatsu Pachinko Station Now 2	SunSoft	SunSoft	December 22, 1999	Unreleased	Unreleased		
Hissatsu Pachinko Station Now 3	SunSoft	SunSoft	February 3, 2000	Unreleased	Unreleased		
Hissatsu Pachinko Station Now 4	SunSoft	SunSoft	July 6, 2000	Unreleased	Unreleased		
Hissatsu Pachinko Station Now 5	SunSoft	SunSoft	July 19, 2000	Unreleased	Unreleased		
Hissatsu Pachinko Station Now 6	SunSoft	SunSoft	November 16, 2000	Unreleased	Unreleased		
Hissatsu Pachinko Station Now 7	SunSoft	SunSoft	December 28, 2000	Unreleased	Unreleased		
Hissatsu Pachinko Station Now 8: Jarinko Chie	SunSoft	SunSoft	March 15, 2001	Unreleased	Unreleased		
Hissatsu Pachinko Station Now 9	SunSoft	SunSoft	February 7, 2002	Unreleased	Unreleased		
Hissatsu Pachinko Station Puchi	SunSoft	SunSoft	September 22, 1999	Unreleased	Unreleased		
Hissatsu Pachinko Station Puchi 2	SunSoft	SunSoft	February 10, 2000	Unreleased	Unreleased		
Hissatsu Pachinko Station Toyomaru Special	SunSoft	SunSoft	October 12, 2000	Unreleased	Unreleased		
Hissatsu Pachinko Station: Classic	SunSoft	SunSoft	April 8, 1999	Unreleased	Unreleased		
Hissatsu Pachinko Station: Classic 2	SunSoft	SunSoft	March 30, 2000	Unreleased	Unreleased		
Hissatsu Pachinko Station: Monster House Special	SunSoft	SunSoft	October 29, 1998	Unreleased	Unreleased		
History of Kita Denshi	Map Japan	Map Japan	January 18, 2001	Unreleased	Unreleased		
Hit Back	Tomy Corporation	Tomy Corporation	April 15, 1999	Unreleased	Unreleased		
Hitori de Dekirumon!	Microvision	Bandai	April 26, 2001	Unreleased	Unreleased		
The Hive	Trimark	Trimark	Unreleased	Unreleased	July 27, 1996		
Hiza no Ue no Partner: Kitty on Your Lap	Kaneko	Culture Publishers	March 12, 1998	Unreleased	Unreleased		
Hogs of War	Infogrames Sheffield House	Infogrames	Unreleased	September 5, 2000	June 8, 2001		
Hokuto no Ken	Banpresto	Banpresto	August 30, 1996	Unreleased	Unreleased		
Hokuto no Ken: Seiki Matsukyu Seishi Densetsu	Bandai	Bandai	October 26, 2000	Unreleased	Unreleased		
Honkaku 4Jin Uchi Geinoujin Taikyoku Mahjong: The Wareme de Pon	Video System	Video System	October 25, 1996	Unreleased	Unreleased		
Honkaku Hanafuda	Altron	Altron	November 12, 1998	Unreleased	Unreleased		
Honkaku Igo	Seta Corporation	Seta Corporation	May 21, 2001	Unreleased	Unreleased		
Honkaku Mahjong: Tetsuman Special	Chat Noir	Naxat Soft	July 19, 1996	Unreleased	Unreleased		
Honkaku Shogi Shinan	Yuki	DigiCube	November 29, 2001	Unreleased	Unreleased		
Honkaku Shogi: Shogi Ou	Warashi	Warashi	September 23, 1998	Unreleased	Unreleased		
Honkaku Yonin Uchi Pro Mahjong: Mahjong Ou	Warashi	Warashi	May 25, 2000	Unreleased	Unreleased		
Honoo no Ryourinin: Cooking Fighter Hao	Nippon Ichi Software	Nippon Ichi Software	May 21, 1998	Unreleased	Unreleased		
The Hoobs	Runecraft	Sony Computer Entertainment	Unreleased	June 7, 2002	Unreleased		
Hooters Road Trip	Hoplite Research	Ubi Soft	Unreleased	Unreleased	March 26, 2002		
Hoshi de Hakken!! Tamagotchi	Bandai	Bandai	February 7, 2002	Unreleased	Unreleased		
Hoshi no Mahoroba	Jorudan	Jorudan	August 1, 2002	Unreleased	Unreleased		
Hoshi no Oka Gakuen Monogatari: Gakuensai	Atelier-Sai	Media Works	October 22, 1998	Unreleased	Unreleased		
Hoshigami: Ruining Blue Earth	Max Five	Atlus Co., Max Five	February 7, 2002	Unreleased	December 19, 2001		
Hot Shot	Phoenix Games	Phoenix Games	Unreleased	June 27, 2003	Unreleased		
Hot Wheels Extreme Racing	Atod AB	THQ	Unreleased	October 12, 2001	September 15, 2001		
Hot Wheels Turbo Racing	Stormfront Studios	Electronic Arts	Unreleased	1999	September 7, 1999		
Houma Hunter Lime: Special Collection Vol. 1	Copya Systems	Asmik Ace	December 22, 1994	Unreleased	Unreleased		
Houma Hunter Lime: Special Collection Vol. 2	Copya Systems	Asmik Ace	September 15, 1995	Unreleased	Unreleased		
Houma Hunter Lime with Paint Maker	Copya Systems	Asmik Ace	February 21, 1997	Unreleased	Unreleased		
Houshinengi	Koei	Koei	September 10, 1998	Unreleased	Unreleased		
Houshinengi Aizouban (Note: update for Houshinengi.)	Koei	Koei	April 1, 1999	Unreleased	Unreleased		
Hugo	ITE Media	ITE Media	Unreleased	1998	Unreleased		
Hugo 2	ITE Media	ITE Media	Unreleased	April 1999	Unreleased		
Hugo: Black Diamond Fever	ITE Media	ITE Media	Unreleased	2001	Unreleased		
Hugo: The Evil Mirror	ITE Media	ITE Media	Unreleased	May 2002	December 15, 2003		
Hugo: Frog Fighter	ITE Media	ITE Media	Unreleased	February 15, 2002	Unreleased		
Hugo: The Quest for the Sunstones	ITE Media	ITE Media	Unreleased	November 3, 2000	Unreleased		
Hunchback of Notredame	The Code Monkeys	Midas Interactive	Unreleased	April 12, 2002	Unreleased		
Hunter X Hunter: Maboroshi no Greed Island	Konami	Konami	October 26, 2000	Unreleased	Unreleased		
Hunter X Hunter: Ubawareta Aura Stone	Konami	Konami	September 27, 2001	Unreleased	Unreleased		
Hyakujuu Sentai GaoRanger	Bandai	Bandai	November 29, 2001	Unreleased	Unreleased		
Hybrid	Vulcan Software	Midas Interactive Entertainment	Unreleased	April 12, 2002	Unreleased		
Hydro Thunder	Blue Shift	Midway Games	Unreleased	2000	February 29, 2000		
Hyouryuu Ki: The Reportage Beyond the Sea	KSS	KSS	October 28, 1999	Unreleased	Unreleased		
Hyper 3-D Pinball •Tilt!^{PAL}	NMS Software	Virgin Interactive Entertainment	February 28, 1997	January 1997	Unreleased		
Hyper Crazy Climber	Nichibutsu	Nichibutsu	February 23, 1996	Unreleased	Unreleased		
Hyper Final Match Tennis^{JP} •Hyper Tennis: Final Match^{PAL}	Human Entertainment	Human Entertainment	March 22, 1996	November 15, 1996	Unreleased		
Hyper Formation Soccer	Human Entertainment	Human Entertainment	October 13, 1995	Unreleased	Unreleased		
Hyper Pachinko	Konami	Konami	July 27, 2000	Unreleased	Unreleased		
Hyper Securities 2	Pack-In-Video	Victor Interactive Software	June 25, 1998	Unreleased	Unreleased		
Hyper Rally	Harvest One	Harvest One	August 30, 1996	Unreleased	Unreleased		
I.Q. Final •Kurushi Final: Mental Blocks^{PAL}	SCEI	Sony Computer Entertainment	December 23, 1998	August 1999	Unreleased		
I'Max Shogi II	I'Max	I'Max	October 9, 1997	Unreleased	Unreleased		
Iblard: Laputa no Kaeru Machi	TV Asahi	System Sacom	October 16, 1997	Unreleased	Unreleased		
Ichigeki: Hagane no Hito	Opus	Bandai	November 2, 1999	Unreleased	Unreleased		
Ide Yosuke Meijin no Shinmi Sen Mahjong	Capcom	Capcom	June 28, 1996	Unreleased	Unreleased		
Ide Yosuke no Mahjong Kazoku	Opus	SETA Corporation	November 3, 1995	Unreleased	Unreleased		
Ide Yosuke no Mahjong Kyoshitsu	Athena	Athena	December 2, 1999	Unreleased	Unreleased		
Idol Janshi Suchie-Pai Limited	Jaleco	Jaleco	March 24, 1995	Unreleased	Unreleased		
Idol Janshi Suchie-Pai II Limited	Jaleco	Jaleco	October 20, 1996	Unreleased	Unreleased		
Idol Promotion: Yumie Suzuki	Allumer	Allumer	May 31, 1996	Unreleased	Unreleased		
Igo o Nintarou!	DigiCube	DigiCube	March 28, 2002	Unreleased	Unreleased		
IHRA Drag Racing	Digital Dialect	Bethesda Softworks	Unreleased	Unreleased	September 20, 2001		
IK+	Ignition Entertainment	Ignition Entertainment	Unreleased	2003	Unreleased		
Ikasama Mahjong	Idea Factory	Idea Factory	May 2, 2000	Unreleased	Unreleased		
Ikkyuu-san: The Quiz	Bandai	Bandai	March 28, 2002	Unreleased	Unreleased		
Image Fight and X-Multiply	Irem	Xing Entertainment	March 19, 1998	Unreleased	Unreleased		
Imadoki no Vampire: Bloody Bride	Jorudan	Atlus	December 27, 1996	Unreleased	Unreleased		
Impact Racing	Funcom Dublin	JVC Musical Industries	Unreleased	July 1996	September 15, 1996		
In Cold Blood	Revolution Software	Dreamcatcher Interactive^{NA}, Sony Computer Entertainment^{PAL}	Unreleased	July 14, 2000	July 15, 2001	P	
In the Hunt	Funcom Dublin	THQ	November 10, 1995	October 1996	March 15, 1996		
Inagawa Junji: Kyoufu no Yashiki	Billiken Soft	Visit	July 1, 1999	Unreleased	Unreleased		
Inagawa Junji: Mayonaka no Taxi	Kaku	Visit	July 13, 2000	Unreleased	Unreleased		
Incredible Crisis	Polygon Magic	Tokuma Shoten^{JP}, Titus Interactive^{NA/EU}	June 24, 1999	November 24, 2000	November 6, 2000		
The Incredible Hulk: The Pantheon Saga	Attention to Detail	Eidos Interactive	Unreleased	December 1996	February 28, 1997		
Independence Day	Radical Entertainment	Fox Interactive	Unreleased	June 13, 1997	March 15, 1997		
Indy 500	Tomy	Tomy^{JP}, JVC Music Europe^{PAL}	May 27, 1997	April 1998	Unreleased		
Infestation	Frontier Developments	Ubisoft	Unreleased	September 1, 2000	Unreleased		
Infinity	KID	KID	March 23, 2000	Unreleased	Unreleased		
Initial D	Kodansha	Kodansha	January 7, 1999	Unreleased	Unreleased		
Inspector Gadget: Gadget's Crazy Maze	Vision Media Engineering	Ubi Soft, Light & Shadow Production	Unreleased	June 8, 2001	August 9, 2001		
I.Q.: Intelligent Qube •Kurushi^{PAL}	SCEI	Sony Computer Entertainment	January 31, 1997	October 1997	September 30, 1997		
Intellivision Classic Games	Gray Matter	Activision	Unreleased	Unreleased	September 15, 1999		
International Cricket Captain 2000	Empire Interactive	Empire Interactive	Unreleased	November 3, 2000	Unreleased		
International Cricket Captain 2001 Ashes Edition	Empire Interactive	Empire Interactive	Unreleased	August 24, 2001	Unreleased		
International Cricket Captain 2002	Empire Interactive	Empire Interactive	Unreleased	May 24, 2002	Unreleased		
International Moto X	Graftgold	Time Warner Interactive^{PAL}, Coconuts Japan^{JP}	September 27, 1996	December 1996	Unreleased		
International Soccer Excite Stage 2000	Art	Epoch	August 24, 2000	Unreleased	Unreleased		
International Superstar Soccer	Konami	Konami	Unreleased	December 8, 2000	Unreleased		
International Superstar Soccer Deluxe	Konami	Konami	Unreleased	February 1997	Unreleased		
International Superstar Soccer Pro 98	Konami	Konami	Unreleased	September 1998	August 21, 1999		
International Track & Field	Konami	Konami	May 31, 1996	June 1996	June 15, 1996	P	
International Track & Field 2000 •International Track & Field 2^{PAL} •Ganbare Nippon! Olympics 2000^{JP}	Konami	Konami	July 13, 2000	2000	December 10, 1999		
Interplay Sports Baseball 2000 •Baseball 2000^{PAL}	Interplay	Interplay	Unreleased	November 1999	April 14, 1999		
Inuyasha	Bandai	Bandai	December 27, 2001	Unreleased	Unreleased		
Inuyasha: A Feudal Fairy Tale •Inuyasha: Sengoku Otogi Kassen^{JP}	Dimps Corporation	Bandai	December 5, 2002	Unreleased	April 8, 2003		
Invasion	Microids	Microids	Unreleased	February 1999	Unreleased		
Invasion from Beyond (B-Movie) •L'invasion vient de l'espace^{FR}	King of the Jungle	GT Interactive	Unreleased	November 1998	November 30, 1998		
Ippatsu Gyakuten: Legend of the Gamble King	Island Creation	Island Creation	January 10, 1997	Unreleased	Unreleased		
Irem Arcade Classics	Irem	I'Max	April 26, 1996	Unreleased	Unreleased		
Iron and Blood	Take-Two Interactive	Acclaim Entertainment	Unreleased	November 1996	October 31, 1996		
Iron Man and X-O Manowar in Heavy Metal	Realtime Associates	Acclaim Entertainment	January 31, 1997	November 1996	October 30, 1996		
Iron Soldier 3	Eclipse Software Design	Vatical Entertainment, Telegames	Unreleased	Unreleased	June 14, 2000		
Irritating Stick	Jaleco Entertainment	Jaleco Entertainment	March 19, 1998	Unreleased	January 31, 1999		
...Iru!	Soft Machine	Takara	March 26, 1998	Unreleased	Unreleased		
iS – internal section	positron	Square	January 28, 1999	Unreleased	Unreleased		
Ishin no Arashi	Koei	Koei	December 11, 1997	Unreleased	Unreleased		
Ishin no Arashi: Bakumatsu Shishiden	Koei	Koei	February 4, 1999	Unreleased	Unreleased		
ISS Pro Evolution •World Soccer Jikkyou Winning Eleven 4^{JP}	Konami	Konami	September 2, 1999	February 25, 2000	February 15, 2000	P	
ISS Pro Evolution 2 •World Soccer Jikkyou Winning Eleven 2000: U-23 Medal Heno Chousen^{JP}	Konami Computer Entertainment Tokyo	Konami	August 24, 2000	March 23, 2001	Unreleased		
Itadaki Street: Gorgeous King	Tomcat System	Enix	September 23, 1998	Unreleased	Unreleased		
The Italian Job	Pixelogic	SCi^{PAL}, Rockstar Games^{NA}	Unreleased	October 5, 2001	May 3, 2002	P	
Itsuka, Kasanariau Ashita e: Sayuri-hen	MBA International	Sony Music Entertainment Japan	August 26, 1999	Unreleased	Unreleased		
Itsuka, Kasanariau Ashita e: Shirou-hen	MBA International	Sony Music Entertainment Japan	August 26, 1999	Unreleased	Unreleased		
Iwatobi Penguin Rocky & Hopper	F2 Company	Nippon Rental	April 25, 1997	Unreleased	Unreleased		
Iwatobi Penguin Rocky & Hopper 2 – Tantei Monogatari	Culture Publishers	Culture Publishers	February 26, 1998	Unreleased	Unreleased		
J's Racin'	TYO	Digital Frontier	September 25, 1997	Unreleased	Unreleased		
J.B. Harold: Blue Chicago Blues	Riverhillsoft	Riverhillsoft	November 22, 1995	Unreleased	Unreleased		
J.League Jikkyou Winning Eleven	KCE Sapporo	Konami	July 21, 1995	Unreleased	Unreleased		
J.League Jikkyou Winning Eleven 2000	Konami	Konami	June 29, 2000	Unreleased	Unreleased		
J.League Jikkyou Winning Eleven 2000 2nd (Note: update for J.League Jikkyou Winning Eleven 2000.)	Konami	Konami	November 30, 2000	Unreleased	Unreleased		
J.League Jikkyou Winning Eleven 2001	Konami	Konami	June 21, 2001	Unreleased	Unreleased		
J.League Jikkyou Winning Eleven 3	Konami	Konami	December 11, 1997	Unreleased	Unreleased		
J.League Jikkyō Winning Eleven '97	Konami	Konami	November 22, 1996	Unreleased	Unreleased		
J.League Soccer: Jikkyou Survival League	Tecmo	Tecmo	December 22, 1999	Unreleased	Unreleased		
J.League Virtual Stadium '96	EA Sports	Electronic Arts	April 26, 1996	Unreleased	Unreleased		
J.League Winning Eleven '98-'99	KCE Sapporo	Konami	December 3, 1998	Unreleased	Unreleased		
Jackie Chan Stuntmaster	Radical Entertainment	Sony Computer Entertainment	Unreleased	May 17, 2000	March 29, 2000		
Jade Cocoon: Story of the Tamamayu	Genki	Genki^{JP}, Crave Entertainment^{NA}, Ubi Soft^{PAL}	December 3, 1998	December 10, 1999	November 30, 1998		
JailBreaker	Highwaystar	NEC Interchannel	June 3, 1999	Unreleased	Unreleased		
Jaja Uma Quartet: Mega Dream Destruction	Studio OX	GMF	September 10, 1998	Unreleased	Unreleased		
Jaleco Collection Vol. 1	Pacific Century Cyber Works	Pacific Century Cyber Works	October 23, 2003	Unreleased	Unreleased		
James Pond 2: Codename: Robocod	Vectordean	Play It Ltd	Unreleased	November 2003	Unreleased		
Jang Jang Koi Shimashow: Lovely Pop 2 in 1	Visco	Visco	February 26, 1998	Unreleased	Unreleased		
Jang Jang Koi Shimashow: Separate 1 - Jang Jang Shimashow	Visco	Visco	April 27, 2000	Unreleased	Unreleased		
Jang Jang Koi Shimashow: Separate 2 - Koi Koi Shimashow	Visco	Visco	April 27, 2000	Unreleased	Unreleased		
Jarin-ko Chie: The Hanafuda	Yuki	Bandai	November 29, 2001	Unreleased	Unreleased		
Jeff Wayne's The War of the Worlds	Pixelogic	GT Interactive	Unreleased	November 19, 1999	Unreleased		
Jellyfish: The Healing Friend	Visit	Visit	September 28, 2000	Unreleased	Unreleased		
Jeopardy!	Artech Studios	Hasbro Interactive	Unreleased	Unreleased	December 9, 1998		
Jeopardy! 2nd Edition	Artech Studios	Hasbro Interactive	Unreleased	Unreleased	September 28, 2000		
Jeremy McGrath Supercross '98	Probe Entertainment	Acclaim Entertainment	Unreleased	July 1998	May 31, 1998		
Jeremy McGrath Supercross 2000	Acclaim Studios Salt Lake City	Acclaim Entertainment	Unreleased	August 25, 2000^{FR,PAL}	July 14, 2000		
Jersey Devil	Megatoon Studios	SCEA^{NA}, Ocean Software^{PAL}, Konami^{JP}	June 24, 1999	December 12, 1997	May 31, 1998		
Jet Ace	Phoenix Games	Phoenix Games	Unreleased	November 15, 2004	Unreleased		
Jet de Go! Let's Go By Airliner	Racdym	Taito	February 1, 2000	Unreleased	Unreleased		
Jet Moto •Jet Rider^{PAL}	SingleTrac, Locomotive Games	SCEA^{NA}, SCEE^{PAL}, SCEI^{JP}	August 7, 1997	February 1997	October 31, 1996		
Jet Moto 2 •Jet Rider 2^{PAL}	SingleTrac	SCEA^{NA}	Unreleased	April 1998	October 31, 1997		
Jet Moto 3	SingleTrac	SCEA^{NA}	Unreleased	Unreleased	August 31, 1999		
Jetracer	Thayer GFX	Midas Interactive	Unreleased	April 12, 2001	Unreleased		
JGTC: All-Japan Grand Touring Car Championship	TYO	TYO	June 18, 1998	Unreleased	Unreleased		
Jigoku Sensei NuBe	Tose	Bandai	May 16, 1997	Unreleased	Unreleased		
Jigsaw Madness •Jigsaw Island: Japan Graffiti^{JP}	Nippon Ichi Software	XS Games	September 13, 1996	June 27, 2003	December 1, 2002		
Jigsaw World	Nippon Ichi Software	Nippon Ichi Software	February 3, 1995	Unreleased	Unreleased		
Jikki Pachi-Slot Tettei Kouryaku: Speed-CR Kinkakuji 3	Culture Publishers	Culture Publishers	August 20, 1998	Unreleased	Unreleased		
Jikki Pachi-Slot Tettei Kouryaku: Yamasa Collection	Culture Publishers	Culture Publishers	March 26, 1998	Unreleased	Unreleased		
Jikkyou Golf Master 2000	Konami	Konami	March 30, 2000	Unreleased	Unreleased		
Jikkyou J.League 1999 Perfect Striker	Konami	Konami	December 2, 1999	Unreleased	Unreleased		
Jikkyou Oshaberi Parodius: Forever With Me	Konami	Konami	December 20, 1996	Unreleased	Unreleased		
Jikkyou Powerful Pro Yakyuu '95	Konami	Konami	December 22, 1994	Unreleased	Unreleased		
Jikkyou Powerful Pro Yakyuu '95 Kaimakuban (Note: update for Jikkyou Powerful Pro Yakyuu '95.)	Diamond Head	Konami	July 14, 1995	Unreleased	Unreleased		
Jikkyou Powerful Pro Yakyuu '97 Kaimakuban	Diamond Head	Konami	August 28, 1997	Unreleased	Unreleased		
Jikkyou Powerful Pro Yakyuu '98 Kaimakuban	Konami	Konami	July 23, 1998	Unreleased	Unreleased		
Jikkyou Powerful Pro Yakyuu '98 Ketteiban (Note: update for Jikkyou Powerful Pro Yakyuu '98 Kaimakuban.)	Konami	Konami	December 23, 1998	Unreleased	Unreleased		
Jikkyou Powerful Pro Yakyuu '99 Kaimakuban	Konami	Konami	July 22, 1999	Unreleased	Unreleased		
Jikkyou Powerful Pro Yakyuu '99 Ketteiban (Note: update for Jikkyou Powerful Pro Yakyuu '99 Kaimakuban.)	Konami	Konami	December 25, 1999	Unreleased	Unreleased		
Jikkyou Powerful Pro Yakyuu 2000 Kaimakuban	Diamond Head	Konami	July 19, 2000	Unreleased	Unreleased		
Jikkyou Powerful Pro Yakyuu 2000 Ketteiban (Note: update for Jikkyou Powerful Pro Yakyuu 2000 Kaimakuban.)	Konami	Konami	December 21, 2000	Unreleased	Unreleased		
Jikkyou Powerful Pro Yakyuu 2001	Diamond Head	Konami	June 7, 2001	Unreleased	Unreleased		
Jikkyou Powerful Pro Yakyuu 2001 Ketteiban (Note: update for Jikkyou Powerful Pro Yakyuu 2001.)	Diamond Head	Konami	December 20, 2001	Unreleased	Unreleased		
Jikkyou Powerful Pro Yakyuu 2002 Haru	Diamond Head	Konami	March 14, 2002	Unreleased	Unreleased		
Jikkyou Powerful Pro Yakyuu Premium-Ban	Konami	Konami	January 23, 2003	Unreleased	Unreleased		
Jikuu Tantei DD: Maboroshi no Lorelei	System Sacom	ASCII Entertainment	July 26, 1996	Unreleased	Unreleased		
Jikuu Tantei DD 2: Hangyaku no Apsalar	System Sacom	ASCII Entertainment	August 27, 1998	Unreleased	Unreleased		
Jimmy Johnson VR Football '98	Padded Cell Studios	Interplay	Unreleased	Unreleased	September 1997		
Jimmy White's 2: Cueball	Awesome Developments	Virgin Interactive Entertainment	Unreleased	April 7, 2000	November 15, 2000		
Jingle Cats: Love Para Daisakusen no Maki	Sony Music Entertainment Japan	Sony Music Entertainment Japan	July 16, 1998	Unreleased	Unreleased		
Jinx	HammerHead, Ltd.	Sony Computer Entertainment	Unreleased	January 31, 2003	Unreleased		
Jissen Pachi-Slot Hisshouhou! 5	Sammy Studios	Sammy Studios	November 27, 1997	Unreleased	Unreleased		
Jissen Pachi-Slot Hisshouhou! Disc Up	Sammy Studios	Sammy Studios	November 27, 1997	Unreleased	Unreleased		
Jissen Pachi-Slot Hisshouhou! Sammy Revolution	Sammy Studios	Sammy Studios	June 25, 1998	Unreleased	Unreleased		
Jissen Pachi-Slot Hisshouhou! Sammy Revolution 2	Sammy Studios	Sammy Studios	April 8, 1999	Unreleased	Unreleased		
Jissen Pachi-Slot Hisshouhou! Single: Epsilon R	Sammy Studios	Sammy Studios	October 28, 1999	Unreleased	Unreleased		
Jissen Pachi-Slot Hisshouhou! Single: Kamen Rider & Gallop	Sammy Studios	MaxBet	October 28, 1999	Unreleased	Unreleased		
Jissen Pachi-Slot Hisshouhou! Single: Kamen Rider V3	Sammy Studios	MaxBet	October 28, 1999	Unreleased	Unreleased		
Jissen Pachi-Slot Hisshouhou! Single: Kung-Fu Lady	Sammy Studios	MaxBet	February 3, 2000	Unreleased	Unreleased		
Jissen Pachi-Slot Hisshouhou! Single: Sea Master X	Sammy Studios	MaxBet	November 11, 1999	Unreleased	Unreleased		
Jissen Pachi-Slot Hisshouhou! Single: Super Star Dust 2	Sammy Studios	MaxBet	February 17, 2000	Unreleased	Unreleased		
Jissen Pachi-Slot Hisshouhou! Single: The Kingdom	Sammy Studios	MaxBet	February 3, 2000	Unreleased	Unreleased		
Jitsumei Jikkyou Keiba Dream Classic	Dream Japan	Bandai	May 18, 2000	Unreleased	Unreleased		
JoJo's Bizarre Adventure	Capcom	Capcom	October 14, 1999	2000	March 31, 2000		
Johnny Bazookatone	U.S. Gold Ltd.	U.S. Gold Ltd.	April 26, 1996	January 1996	February 15, 1996		
Jockey Zero	Right Stuff	Right Stuff	November 1, 1996	Unreleased	Unreleased		
Jonah Lomu Rugby	Codemasters	Rage Software	Unreleased	March 31, 1997	Unreleased		
Joryuu Janshi ni Chousen	Culture Brain	Culture Brain	February 11, 1999	Unreleased	Unreleased		
Jounetsu * Nekketsu Athletes: Nakimushi Coach no Nikki	Right Stuff	Right Stuff	October 9, 1997	Unreleased	Unreleased		
Judge Dredd	Gremlin Interactive	Activision	Unreleased	November 1997	March 31, 1998		
Juggernaut	Jaleco Entertainment	Will	November 19, 1998	Unreleased	September 30, 1999		
Jumping Flash!	Exact	Sony Computer Entertainment	April 28, 1995	September 29, 1995	November 1, 1995		
Jumping Flash! 2	Exact	Sony Computer Entertainment	April 26, 1996	October 1, 1996	August 21, 1996		
JumpStart Wildlife Safari Field Trip	Dice	Knowledge Adventure	Unreleased	Unreleased	October 19, 2001		
Junclassic C.C. & Rope Club	T&E Soft	T&E Soft	April 23, 1998	Unreleased	Unreleased		
Jungle Park	Saru Brunei	Bandai Visual	February 26, 1998	Unreleased	Unreleased		
The Jungle Book Groove Party^{EU} •Walt Disney's The Jungle Book: Rhythm N'Groove^{NA}	Ubi Soft Shanghai	Ubi Soft^{NA}, Sony Computer Entertainment^{EU}	Unreleased	November 17, 2000	December 8, 2000	P	
Junjou de Karen Meimai Kishi-dan: Spectral Force Seishoujo Gaiden	Idea Factory	Idea Factory	November 25, 1999	Unreleased	Unreleased		
Junk Brain Diagnosis	Exit	Oracion	March 25, 1999	Unreleased	Unreleased		
Jupiter Strike	Taito	^{PALNA} Acclaim, ^{JP} Taito	August 25, 1995	December 1995	December 6, 1995		
K-1 The Arena Fighters •Fighting Illusion^{JP}	Daft	THQ	August 9, 1996	May 1997	February 28, 1997		
K-1 Grand Prix	Daft	Jaleco Entertainment	Unreleased	Unreleased	January 25, 2000		
K-1 Oujya ni Narou!	Daft	Xing Entertainment	March 30, 2000	Unreleased	Unreleased		
K-1 Revenge	Daft	Jaleco Entertainment	September 11, 1997	Unreleased	February 28, 1999		
K-1 World Grand Prix 2001 Kaimakuden	Daft	Konami	March 29, 2001	Unreleased	Unreleased		
K9.5: Live in Airedale	Lightspan	Lightspan	Unreleased	Unreleased	1997		
K9.5: The Hollywood Premiere	Lightspan	Lightspan	Unreleased	Unreleased	1997		
K9.5: The Tail-Wag Tour	Lightspan	Lightspan	Unreleased	Unreleased	1997		
K9.5: We are the Dogs	Lightspan	Lightspan	Unreleased	Unreleased	1997		
K9.5: WebTunes	Lightspan	Lightspan	Unreleased	Unreleased	1997		
Kaeru no Ehon: Adventure for the Lost Memories	Infinity	Victor Interactive Software	October 21, 1999	Unreleased	Unreleased		
Kaettekita Cyborg Kuro-Chan	Konami	Konami	November 28, 2002	Unreleased	Unreleased		
Kaettekita Pachiokun Dream Collection	Coconuts Japan	Coconuts Japan	July 2, 1998	Unreleased	Unreleased		
Kagaku Ninja-Tai Gatchaman: The Shooting	Warashi	Bandai	June 27, 2002	Unreleased	Unreleased		
Kagayaku Kisetsu e	Kid	Kid	April 1, 1999	Unreleased	Unreleased		
Kagero: Deception 2	Tecmo	Tecmo^{JP/NA}, Virgin Interactive Entertainment^{EU}	July 23, 1998	September 10, 1999	October 14, 1998		
Kahen Soukou Gunbike: Speed Power Gunbike	Inti Creates	Sony Music Entertainment Japan	April 23, 1998	Unreleased	Unreleased		
Kaibutsu Para-Dice	Make Soft	Make Soft	July 17, 1997	Unreleased	Unreleased		
Kaijuu Senki	Produce!	Produce!	November 15, 1996	Unreleased	Unreleased		
Kaikan Phrase: Datenshi Kourin	Produce!	Enix	February 24, 2000	Unreleased	Unreleased		
Kaitohranma Miyabi	Imagineer	Imagineer	January 21, 1999	Unreleased	Unreleased		
Kaitou Apricot	Kid	Takuyo	May 22, 2003	Unreleased	Unreleased		
Kakinoki Shogi	ASCII Entertainment	ASCII Entertainment	December 22, 1994	Unreleased	Unreleased		
Kakinoki Shogi 2	ASCII Entertainment	ASCII Entertainment	March 26, 1998	Unreleased	Unreleased		
Kakuge-Yaro: Fighting Game Creator	Outback	Increment-P	February 17, 2000	Unreleased	Unreleased		
Kakugo no Susume	Tomy	Tomy	March 28, 1997	Unreleased	Unreleased		
Kamen Rider	KAZe	Bandai	October 1, 1998	Unreleased	Unreleased		
Kamen Rider Agito	Kaze	Bandai	November 29, 2001	Unreleased	Unreleased		
Kamen Rider: The Bike Race	Highwaystar	Bandai	October 25, 2001	Unreleased	Unreleased		
Kamen Rider Heroes	Bandai	Bandai	July 18, 2002	Unreleased	Unreleased		
Kamen Rider Kuuga	Kaze	Bandai	December 21, 2000	Unreleased	Unreleased		
Kamen Rider Ryuki	Digifloyd	Bandai	November 28, 2002	Unreleased	Unreleased		
Kamen Rider V3	Kaze	Bandai	September 14, 2000	Unreleased	Unreleased		
Kaminari Ishiyumi Kihei Guybrave	Avit	Axelia	July 17, 1997	Unreleased	Unreleased		
Kaminari Ishiyumi Kihei Guybrave II	Avit	Axelia	October 29, 1998	Unreleased	Unreleased		
Kanazawa Shogi '95	SETA Corporation	SETA Corporation	April 21, 1995	Unreleased	Unreleased		
Kanazawa Shogi Tsuki	SETA Corporation	SETA Corporation	May 20, 1999	Unreleased	Unreleased		
Karan Koron Gakuen: Doki Doki Hen	J-Wing	J-Wing	February 24, 2000	Unreleased	Unreleased		
Karan Koron Gakuen: Munekyun Hen	J-Wing	J-Wing	March 30, 2000	Unreleased	Unreleased		
Karan Koron Gakuen: Pure Love Hen	J-Wing	J-Wing	April 20, 2000	Unreleased	Unreleased		
Kart Challenge	Interactive entertainment	Midas Interactive	Unreleased	2000	Unreleased		
Kartia: The Word of Fate •Rebus^{JP} •Legend of Kartia^{PAL}	Atlus	Atlus, Konami^{PAL}	March 26, 1998	December 25, 1999	August 7, 1998		
Karyuu Jyou	Gust	Gust	September 25, 1997	Unreleased	Unreleased		
Kasei Monogatari	Vistec	ASCII Entertainment	October 22, 1998	Unreleased	Unreleased		
Katon-Kun	Irem	Irem	September 21, 2000	Unreleased	Unreleased		
Katou Hifumi Kudan: Shogi Club	Hect	Hect	November 27, 1997	Unreleased	Unreleased		
Kattobi Tune	Genki	Genki	April 23, 1998	Unreleased	Unreleased		
Kawa no Nushi Tsuri: Hikyou o Motomete	Victor Interactive Software	Victor Interactive Software	August 20, 1998	Unreleased	Unreleased		
Kaze no Notam	Artdink	Artdink	September 11, 1997	Unreleased	Unreleased		
Kaze no Oka Kouen Nite	TechnoSoft	TechnoSoft	September 2, 1998	Unreleased	Unreleased		
KazMania: Chaos in KazMania	Lightspan	Lightspan	Unreleased	Unreleased	1997		
KazMania: Trail of Gems	Lightspan	Lightspan	Unreleased	Unreleased	1997		
Keeper	Fupac, Success Corp.	Success Corp.	October 24, 2002	Unreleased	Unreleased		
Kekkon: Marriage	West One	Shogakukan	October 10, 1996	Unreleased	Unreleased		
Kenki Ippatsu! Crane Master ni Narou!	DDL, Inc.	FAB Communications	August 3, 2000	Unreleased	Unreleased		
Kenki Ippatsu! Shovel Master ni Narou!	DDL, Inc.	FAB Communications	August 3, 2000	Unreleased	Unreleased		
Kensei: The King of Boxing •Victory Boxing Champion Edition^{PAL}	Victor Interactive Software	Victor Interactive Software	November 15, 1996	December 1996	Unreleased		
Kensei: Sacred Fist	Konami	KCET	November 19, 1998	1998	November 30, 1998		
Kero Kero King	Amedio	Media Factory	November 2, 2000	Unreleased	Unreleased		
Khamrai	Alpha Unit	Namco	October 5, 2000	Unreleased	Unreleased		
Kickboxing •Kickboxing Knockout^{EU} •Simple 1500 Series Vol. 64: The Kickboxing^{JP}	Jorudan	D3 Publisher^{JP}, Agetec^{NA}, Midas Interactive Entertainment^{EU}	July 5, 2002	2002	March 1, 2002		
Kick Off World	Anco Software	Funsoft	Unreleased	June 1998	Unreleased		
Kid Klown in Crazy Chase 2: Love Love Hani Soudatsusen	Kemco	Kemco	December 6, 1996	Unreleased	Unreleased		
Kid Mix Section: Character Collection	Kid	Kid	June 28, 2001	Unreleased	Unreleased		
Kidou Butouden G Gundam: The Battle	Natsume Co., Ltd.	Bandai	October 10, 2002	Unreleased	Unreleased		
Kidou Keisatsu Patlabor: Game Edition	Bandai Visual	Bandai Visual	November 30, 2000	Unreleased	Unreleased		
Kidou Senki Gundam W: The Battle	Natsume Co., Ltd.	Bandai	October 10, 2002	Unreleased	Unreleased		
Kidou Senshi Gundam Version 2.0	Bec	Bandai	March 29, 1996	Unreleased	Unreleased		
Kidou Senshi Gundam: Giren no Yabou- Zeon no Keifu	Bandai	Bandai	February 10, 2000	Unreleased	Unreleased		
Kidou Senshi Gundam: Giren no Yabou- Zeon no Keifu – Kouryaku Shireisho (Note: expansion for Kidou Senshi Gundam: Giren no Yabou- Zeon no Keifu.) (Note: Contains a quiz mini-game.)	Bandai	Bandai	June 29, 2000	Unreleased	Unreleased		
Kidou Senshi Gundam: The Gunjin Shogi	Amedio	Bandai	October 25, 2001	Unreleased	Unreleased		
Kiganjo	Kodansha	Kodansha	December 22, 1999	Unreleased	Unreleased		
Kikansha Thomas to Nakamatachi	Bandai	Bandai	September 21, 2000	Unreleased	Unreleased		
Kikuni Masahiko: Warau Fukei-san Pachi-Slot Hunter	Forum	Forum	December 9, 1994	Unreleased	Unreleased		
Kileak: The DNA Imperative •Kileak: The Blood^{JP,PAL}	Genki	Sony Computer Entertainment	January 27, 1995	September 29, 1995	September 9, 1995		
Killer Loop	Crave Entertainment	VCC Entertainment	Unreleased	November 9, 1999	October 31, 1999		
Killing Zone	Scarab	Naxat Soft^{JP}, Acclaim Entertainment^{NA}	March 29, 1996	Unreleased	September 13, 1996		
Kimagure My Baby	Axela	ASK	September 10, 1998	Unreleased	Unreleased		
Kimero!! Hero Gakuen: Eiyuu ni Shinjutsu Nashi	Central Systems	Central Systems	March 23, 2000	Unreleased	Unreleased		
Kimi ni Steady	CD Bros.	CD Bros.	September 28, 2000	Unreleased	Unreleased		
Kimi no Kimochi, Boku no Kokoro	Japan Media Programming	Takara	September 14, 1999	Unreleased	Unreleased		
Kindaichi Shounen no Jikenbo: Hihoushima Aratanaru Sangeki	Digital Frontier	Kodansha	November 29, 1996	Unreleased	Unreleased		
Kindaichi Shounen no Jikenbo: Jigoku Yuuen Satsujin Jiken	Digital Frontier	Kodansha	March 26, 1998	Unreleased	Unreleased		
Kindaichi Shounen no Jikenbo 3: Shouryuu Densetsu Satsujin Jiken	Digital Frontier	Kodansha	August 5, 1999	Unreleased	Unreleased		
King of Bowling	Coconuts Japan	Aisystem Tokyo	September 29, 1995	Unreleased	Unreleased		
King of Bowling 2	Coconuts Japan	Coconuts Japan^{JP}, Midas Interactive Entertainment^{EU}	August 27, 1998	September 1, 2000	Unreleased		
King of Bowling 3	DigiCube	Phoenix Games	Unreleased	June 27, 2003	Unreleased		
The King of Fighters '95	SNK	SNK	June 28, 1996	June 1996	August 31, 1996		
The King of Fighters '96	SNK	SNK	July 30, 1997	Unreleased	Unreleased		
The King of Fighters '97	SNK	SNK	May 28, 1998	Unreleased	Unreleased		
The King of Fighters '98	SNK	SNK	March 25, 1999	Unreleased	Unreleased		
The King of Fighters '99	SNK	SNK	March 23, 2000	Unreleased	April 22, 2001		
The King of Fighters: Kyo	Yumekobo	SNK	November 27, 1998	Unreleased	Unreleased		
King of Parlor	TEN	TEN	October 18, 1996	Unreleased	Unreleased		
King of Parlor 2	TEN	TEN	June 11, 1998	Unreleased	Unreleased		
King of Producer	Aqua Rouge	GMF	December 11, 1997	Unreleased	Unreleased		
King of Stallion	Nichibutsu	Nichibutsu	July 26, 1996	Unreleased	Unreleased		
Kingsley's Adventure	Psygnosis	Psygnosis	Unreleased	October 22, 1999	October 7, 1999		
King's Field	FromSoftware	FromSoftware	December 16, 1994	Unreleased	Unreleased		
King's Field II^{JP} •King's Field^{PAL,NA}	FromSoftware	FromSoftware^{JP}, ASCII Entertainment^{NA}, Sony Computer Entertainment^{PAL}	July 21, 1995	December 1995	October 11, 1996		
King's Field III^{JP} •King's Field II^{NA}	FromSoftware	FromSoftware^{JP}, ASCII Entertainment^{NA}	June 21, 1996	Unreleased	November 20, 1996		
Kinniku Banzuke: Road to Sasuke	Konami	Konami	April 27, 2000	Unreleased	Unreleased		
Kinniku Banzuke Vol. 1: Ore ga Saikyou no Otoko	Konami	Konami	December 16, 1999	Unreleased	Unreleased		
Kinniku Banzuke Vol. 2: Aratanarugenkai Enochousen!	Konami	Konami	March 23, 2000	Unreleased	Unreleased		
Kinniku Banzuke Vol. 3 – Saikyou no Challenger Tanjyou!	Konami	Konami	December 21, 2000	Unreleased	Unreleased		
Kirikou	Étranges Libellules	Wanadoo	Unreleased	November 9, 2001	Unreleased		
Kisha de Go!	Taito	Taito	March 23, 2000	Unreleased	Unreleased		
Kishu Michi	SunSoft	SunSoft	September 7, 2000	Unreleased	Unreleased		
Kita Denshi Virtua Pachi-Slot	Map Japan	Map Japan	January 28, 1999	Unreleased	Unreleased		
Kita Denshi Virtua Pachi-Slot 2	Map Japan	Map Japan	May 2, 2000	Unreleased	Unreleased		
Kiss Pinball	Wildfire Studios	Take-Two Interactive	Unreleased	March 23, 2001	April 25, 2001		
Kitchen Panic	Panther Software	Panther Software	May 28, 1998	Unreleased	Unreleased		
Kitty the Kool!	Imagineer	Imagineer	November 26, 1998	Unreleased	Unreleased		
Kiwame Daidougi: Tsumuya Tsumazaruya	Mycom	Mycom	June 21, 1996	Unreleased	Unreleased		
Kizuna Toiu Na no Pendant	Stack	NEC Interchannel	April 6, 2000	Unreleased	Unreleased		
KKND2: Krossfire	Krome Studios Melbourne	Krome Studios Melbourne	Unreleased	April 15, 1999	Unreleased		
Klaymen Gun-Hockey	KIDSMIND Inc.	Riverhillsoft	November 25, 1999	Unreleased	Unreleased		
Klaymen Klaymen: The Neverhood Chronicles •The Neverhood^{NA}	The Neverhood, Riverhill Soft	DreamWorks Interactive	April 23, 1998	Unreleased	Unreleased		
Klonoa: Door to Phantomile	Namco	Namco^{JP}, Namco Hometek^{NA}, Sony Computer Entertainment^{EU}	December 11, 1997	June 5, 1998	June 1998		
Klonoa Beach Volleyball	Namco	Namco^{JP}, Sony Computer Entertainment^{EU}	April 25, 2002	September 20, 2002	Unreleased		
Knockout Kings 99	Black Ops Entertainment	EA Sports	Unreleased	1998	October 31, 1998		
Knockout Kings 2000	Black Ops Entertainment	EA Sports	Unreleased	1999	October 31, 1999		
Knockout Kings 2001	Black Ops Entertainment	EA Sports	Unreleased	Unreleased	October 30, 2000		
KO the Live Boxing	Altron	Altron	June 4, 1998	Unreleased	Unreleased		
Kochira Katsushikaku Kameari Kouenzen: Hashutsujo – High-Tech Building Shinkou Soshi Sakusen! no Kan	Aisystem Tokyo	Bandai	July 24, 1997	Unreleased	Unreleased		
Kogepan: Pan mo Game o Yarurashii...	AIA	AIA	December 12, 2002	Unreleased	Unreleased		
Koh 2: Shogun	Rhythmics	ASK	October 26, 2000	Unreleased	Unreleased		
Koi Yohou	PrincessSoft	PrincessSoft	July 26, 2001	Unreleased	Unreleased		
Kojin Kyouju: La Lecon Particuliere	Mycom	Mycom	April 9, 1998	Unreleased	Unreleased		
Kokohore! Pukka: Dig-a-Dig Pukka	SCEI	SCEI	December 7, 2000	Unreleased	Unreleased		
Komocchi	Open Sesame	Victor Interactive Software	September 20, 2001	Unreleased	Unreleased		
Konami Antiques MSX Collection Vol. 1	Konami	Konami	November 20, 1997	Unreleased	Unreleased		
Konami Antiques MSX Collection Vol. 2	Konami	Konami	January 22, 1998	Unreleased	Unreleased		
Konami Antiques MSX Collection Vol. 3	Konami	Konami	March 19, 1998	Unreleased	Unreleased		
Konami Arcade Classics	Konami	Konami	May 13, 1999	Unreleased	November 30, 1999		
Konohana: True Report	Vridge	Success	April 26, 2001	Unreleased	Unreleased		
Konyamo Dorubako!!	Hearty Robin	Hearty Robin	March 11, 1999	Unreleased	Unreleased		
Konyamo Dorubako!! 2000	Hearty Robin	Hearty Robin	January 13, 2000	Unreleased	Unreleased		
Konyamo Dorubako!! 2001	Hearty Robin	Hearty Robin	December 13, 2001	Unreleased	Unreleased		
Koro Koro Post Nin	Media Entertainment	Media Entertainment	January 1, 2002	Unreleased	Unreleased		
Kosodate Quiz: My Angel	Namco	Namco	November 13, 1997	Unreleased	Unreleased		
Kosodate Quiz: Motto My Angel	Namco	Namco	March 25, 1999	Unreleased	Unreleased		
Koten Tsugoshuu: Shijin no Kan	Vap	Vap	February 2, 1996	Unreleased	Unreleased		
Kotetsu Reiki: Steeldom	Technosoft	Technosoft	August 30, 1996	Unreleased	Unreleased		
Kotobuki Grand Prix	Syscom	Midas Interactive Entertainment	April 8, 1999	February 7, 2003	Unreleased		
Kōshien V	Magical Company	Magical Company	May 16, 1997	Unreleased	Unreleased		
Kouashi Kikou Shidan: Bein Panzer	Aprize Inc.	SCEI	October 12, 2000	Unreleased	Unreleased		
Koudelka	Sacnoth	^{JPNA} SNK, Infogrames	December 16, 1999	September 29, 2000	June 29, 2000		
Kouryuu Sangoku Engi	Xing Entertainment	Xing Entertainment	November 29, 1996	Unreleased	Unreleased		
Kouryuuki	Koei	Koei	March 26, 1998	Unreleased	Unreleased		
Kouyasai	Astrovision	Shoeisha	February 25, 1999	Unreleased	Unreleased		
Kowai Shashin	Media Entertainment	Media Entertainment	July 25, 2002	Unreleased	Unreleased		
Kowloon Jou	Media Rings	Media Rings	December 7, 2000	Unreleased	Unreleased		
Kowloon's Gate	Zeque	Sony Music Entertainment Japan	February 28, 1997	Unreleased	Unreleased		
Krazy Ivan	Psygnosis	Psygnosis	October 4, 1996	January 1996	February 15, 1996		
Kula World •KulaQuest^{JP} •Roll Away^{NA}	Game Design Sweden AB	Psygnosis	May 27, 1999	July 1998	November 30, 1998		
Kuma no Pooh Tarou: Karaha Pinkuda! Zenin shuugou!! (Sore da messu)	Shogakukan	Shogakukan	January 13, 1996	Unreleased	Unreleased		
Kuma no Pooh-San: Mori no Nakamato 123	Atlus	Atlus	November 15, 2001	Unreleased	Unreleased		
Kumitate Battle: Kuttu Ketto	TechnoSoft	TechnoSoft	March 12, 1998	Unreleased	Unreleased		
Kunoichi Torimonochou	Polestar	GMF	February 25, 1999	Unreleased	Unreleased		
Kuon no Kizuna	Fog	Fog	December 3, 1998	Unreleased	Unreleased		
Kuro no Juusan	Tonkin House	Tonkin House	September 27, 1996	Unreleased	Unreleased		
Kuro no Ken: Blade of the Darkness	CD Bros.	CD Bros.	October 9, 1997	Unreleased	Unreleased		
Kuroi Hitomi no Noir: Cielgris Fantasm (Noir Yuex Noire)	Gust	Gust	July 1, 1999	Unreleased	Unreleased		
Kurt Warner's Arena Football Unleashed	Midway	Midway	Unreleased	Unreleased	May 18, 2000		
Kuru Kuru Cube	Nousite	Nousite	November 9, 2000	Unreleased	Unreleased		
Kuru Kuru Panic	Kool Kizz	Kool Kizz	December 20, 1996	Unreleased	Unreleased		
KuruKuru MaruMaru	Japan Art Media (JAM)	Hudson	March 1, 2001	Unreleased	Unreleased		
KuruKuru Twinkle: Onegai Ohoshisama	Tomcat System	Tomy Corporation	October 4, 1996	Unreleased	Unreleased		
Kurumi Miracle	Banpresto	Banpresto	September 25, 1997	Unreleased	Unreleased		
Kururin Pa!	Sky Think Systems	Sky Think Systems	July 7, 1995	Unreleased	Unreleased		
Kuubo Senki	General Support	Unbalance	February 4, 1999	Unreleased	Unreleased		
Kyoro-chan no Purikura Daisakusen	Kan's	Tomy Corporation	February 11, 1999	Unreleased	Unreleased		
Kyoto Bugi Monogatari	Visit	Visit	June 21, 2001	Unreleased	Unreleased		
Kyoufu Shinbun	Atelier Double	Yutaka	January 24, 1997	Unreleased	Unreleased		
Kyoutei Wars: Mark 6	ParityBit	Enterbrain	July 5, 2002	Unreleased	Unreleased		
Kyuin	Media Entertainment	Media Entertainment	May 31, 1996	Unreleased	Unreleased		
Kyuukuoku no Soukoban	Thinking Rabbit	Itochu	September 13, 1996	Unreleased	Unreleased		
L no Kisetsu: A piece of memories	Tonkin House	Tonkin House	August 5, 1999	Unreleased	Unreleased		
Lagnacure	Artdink	Sony Music Entertainment Japan	October 2, 1997	Unreleased	Unreleased		
Lagnacure Legend	Artdink	Artdink	July 6, 2000	Unreleased	Unreleased		
Lake Masters	Nexus Interact	Dazz	August 2, 1996	Unreleased	Unreleased		
Lake Masters 2	Nexus Interact	Dazz	July 9, 1998	Unreleased	Unreleased		
Lake Masters Pro	Nexus Interact	Dazz	September 14, 1999	Unreleased	Unreleased		
The Land Before Time: Big Water Adventure	Digital Illusions	TDK Mediactive	Unreleased	May 9, 2003	November 27, 2002		
The Land Before Time: Great Valley Racing Adventure	Vision Scape	TDK Mediactive	Unreleased	2001	May 4, 2001		
The Land Before Time: Return to the Great Valley	Realtime Associates	Sound Source Interactive^{NA}, TDK Mediactive^{EU}	Unreleased	2000	September 15, 2000		
Langrisser I & II	NCS	NCS	July 31, 1997	Unreleased	Unreleased		
Langrisser IV & V Final Edition	NCS	NCS	January 28, 1998	Unreleased	Unreleased		
Largo Winch.//Commando Sar	Rebellion	Ubi Soft	Unreleased	September 6, 2002	February 1, 2002		
Las Vegas Dream 2	Dice	Imagineer	February 28, 1997	Unreleased	Unreleased		
The Last Blade	SNK	SNK	February 25, 1999	Unreleased	Unreleased		
The Last Report	Microids	Microids^{PAL}, Shouei^{JP}	August 6, 1998	March 1998	Unreleased		
Lattice: 200EC7	Nousite	Hamster	April 27, 2000	Unreleased	Unreleased		
Le Concert ff	SAME Creative Inc.	Warashi	December 9, 1999	Unreleased	Unreleased		
Le Concert pp	SAME Creative Inc.	Warashi	December 9, 1999	Unreleased	Unreleased		
Leading Jockey '99	Harvest One	Harvest One	April 1, 1999	Unreleased	Unreleased		
Leading Jockey: Highbred	Harvest One	Harvest One	October 10, 1996	Unreleased	Unreleased		
Legacy of Kain: Soul Reaver	Crystal Dynamics	Eidos Interactive	Unreleased	September 3, 1999	August 16, 1999	P	
Legend	Toka	Funsoft	Unreleased	December 15, 1998	Unreleased		
The Legend of Dragoon	Sony Computer Entertainment	Sony Computer Entertainment	December 2, 1999	January 19, 2001	June 11, 2000		
The Legend of Heroes I & II: Eiyuu Densetsu	Falcom	GMF	June 25, 1998	Unreleased	Unreleased		
The Legend of Heroes III: Shiroki Majo	Falcom	GMF	March 19, 1998	Unreleased	Unreleased		
The Legend of Heroes IV: Akai Shizuku	Falcom	GMF	August 27, 1998	Unreleased	Unreleased		
Legend of Legaia	Contrail	Sony Computer Entertainment	October 29, 1998	May 27, 2000	March 17, 1999		
Legend of Mana •Seiken Densetsu: Legend of Mana^{JP}	Square	Square^{JP}, Square Electronic Arts^{NA}	July 15, 1999	Unreleased	June 7, 2000		
Legend of Mulan	The Code Monkeys	Phoenix Games	Unreleased	2003	Unreleased		
Legend of Pocahontas	The Code Monkeys	Midas Interactive	Unreleased	April 12, 2002	Unreleased		
Lego Island 2: The Brickster's Revenge	Silicon Dreams Studio	Lego Media	Unreleased	2001	March 2001		
Lego no Sekai	Bandai	Bandai	July 18, 2002	Unreleased	Unreleased		
Lego Racers	High Voltage Software	Lego Media	Unreleased	September 1999	December 17, 1999		
Lego Rock Raiders	Data Design Interactive	Lego Media	Unreleased	1999	August 17, 2000		
Lemmings 3D •3D Lemmings^{PAL}	Clockwork Games	Psygnosis	November 8, 1996	September 29, 1995	November 21, 1995		
Lemmings & Oh No! More Lemmings	Psygnosis	Psygnosis	Unreleased	1998	October 10, 1998		
Let's Go Flyfishing	Victor Interactive Software	Victor Interactive Software	January 21, 1999	Unreleased	Unreleased		
Lethal Enforcers I & II	Konami	Konami	November 20, 1997	November 20, 1997	November 1997		
LiberoGrande	Namco	Namco^{JP}, Sony Computer Entertainment^{PAL}	November 26, 1998	1998	Unreleased		
Liberogrande International •Liberogrande 2^{JP}	Namco	Namco^{JP}, Sony Computer Entertainment^{PAL}	September 7, 2000	2000	Unreleased		
LifeScape 2: Bosy Bionics	Scitron & Art	MediaQuest	August 7, 1997	Unreleased	Unreleased		
Light Fantasy Gaiden: Nyanyan ga Nyan	Tonkin House	Tonkin House	October 21, 1999	Unreleased	Unreleased		
Lightning Legend: Daigo no Daibouken	KCET	Konami	December 20, 1996	Unreleased	Unreleased		
Linda Cube Again	Alfa System	SCEI	September 25, 1997	Unreleased	Unreleased		
Ling Rise	Atelier Double	Epoch	November 25, 1999	Unreleased	Unreleased		
The Lion King: Simba's Mighty Adventure	Paradox Development	Activision	Unreleased	March 9, 2001	December 22, 2000		
Lion and the King	The Code Monkeys	Midas Interactive Entertainment	Unreleased	April 13, 2001	Unreleased		
Lion And The King 2	The Code Monkeys	Phoenix Games	Unreleased	2003	Unreleased		
Little Big Adventure	Adeline Software International	Electronic Arts	July 19, 1996	1997	Unreleased		
Little Lovers: She So Game	OeRSTED	NTT	September 2, 1999	Unreleased	Unreleased		
Little Princess: Marl Ōkoku no Ningyō Hime 2	Nippon Ichi Software	Nippon Ichi Software	November 25, 1999	Unreleased	Unreleased		
Live Wire!	The Code Monkeys	Sales Curve Interactive	Unreleased	April 1999	Unreleased		
LMA Manager	Codemasters	Codemasters	Unreleased	September 15, 1999	Unreleased		
LMA Manager 2001	Codemasters	Codemasters	Unreleased	March 16, 2001	Unreleased		
LMA Manager 2002	Codemasters	Codemasters	Unreleased	November 2, 2001	Unreleased		
Loaded	Gremlin Interactive	Interplay^{NA}, Gremlin Interactive^{PAL}, Electronic Arts Victor^{JP}	March 15, 1996	February 1996	December 12, 1995	P	
Lode Runner	Presage Soft	Natsume Inc.	Unreleased	Unreleased	February 4, 1998		
Lode Runner 2	Success	Success	March 30, 2000	Unreleased	Unreleased		
Lode Runner Extra (Note: stand-alone expansion for Lode Runner: The Legend Returns.)	Petra	Petra	January 19, 1997	Unreleased	Unreleased		
Lode Runner: The Legend Returns	Presage Software	Patra	February 16, 1996	Unreleased	Unreleased		
Logic Mahjong Souryu	Nippon Ichi Software	Nippon Ichi Software	December 20, 1996	Unreleased	Unreleased		
Logic Mahjong Souryu: 3-Player Version	Nippon Ichi Software	Nippon Ichi Software	May 4, 1999	Unreleased	Unreleased		
Logic Pro Adventure	Aqua Rouge	Aqua Rouge	March 1, 2001	Unreleased	Unreleased		
Logic Puzzle Rainbow Town	Human Entertainment	Human Entertainment	March 8, 1996	Unreleased	Unreleased		
London Racer	Davilex	Davilex	Unreleased	September 29, 2000	Unreleased		
London Racer II	Kiss	Davilex	Unreleased	June 14, 2002	Unreleased		
London Seirei Tantei-dan	Bandai	Bandai	May 20, 1999	Unreleased	Unreleased		
Lone Soldier	Tempest Software	Telstar^{PAL}, Virgin Interactive Entertainment^{JP}	October 4, 1996	January 1996	Unreleased		
Looney Tunes Racing	Circus Freak	Infogrames	Unreleased	March 16, 2001	November 13, 2000		
Lord Monarch: Shin Gaia Oukokuki	Toshiba EMI	Toshiba EMI	December 23, 1998	Unreleased	Unreleased		
Lord of Monsters	SCEI	SCEI	June 10, 1999	Unreleased	Unreleased		
Lord of the Jungle	The Code Monkeys	Midas Interactive	Unreleased	April 12, 2001	Unreleased		
The Lost World: Jurassic Park	DreamWorks Interactive	Electronic Arts	December 4, 1997	September 1, 1997	August 31, 1997	P	
Louvre: The Final Curse	Visual Impact	Wanadoo	Unreleased	November 16, 2001	Unreleased		
Love & Destroy	Inti Creates	SCEI	December 16, 1999	Unreleased	Unreleased		
Love Game's: Wai Wai Tennis	Tears / Ichikawa	Tears / Ichikawa	March 28, 1997	Unreleased	Unreleased		
Love Game's: Wai Wai Tennis 2^{JP} •Yeh Yeh Tennis^{PAL}	Sunsoft	Sunsoft	December 22, 1999	September 8, 2000	Unreleased		
Love Game's: Wai Wai Tennis Plus	Hamster Corporation	Hamster Corporation	March 28, 2002	Unreleased	Unreleased		
Love Hina: Ai wa Kotoba no Chuu ni	KCEJ	KCEJ	September 28, 2000	Unreleased	Unreleased		
Love Hina 2: Kotoba wa Konayuki no You ni	KCEJ	KCEJ	November 30, 2000	Unreleased	Unreleased		
Love Love Truck	Scitron & Art	TYO	June 24, 1999	Unreleased	Unreleased		
Love Therapy	B-Factory	B-Factory	July 9, 1998	Unreleased	Unreleased		
LSD	OutSide Directors Company	Bandai	October 22, 1998	Unreleased	Unreleased		
Lucifer Ring	Soft Machine	Toshiba EMI	December 23, 1998	Unreleased	Unreleased		
Luciferd	TEN	TEN	August 27, 1998	Unreleased	Unreleased		
Lucky Luke	Infogrames Multimedia	Infogrames Multimedia	Unreleased	1998	November 1998	P	
Lucky Luke: Western Fever	Kalisto	Infogrames	Unreleased	November 2, 2001	Unreleased		
Luftwaffe: Doitsu Kuugun o Shiki Seyo	Pegasus Japan	Victor Interactive Software	February 25, 1999	Unreleased	Unreleased		
Lunar: Silver Star Story Complete	Game Arts	Working Designs	May 28, 1998	Unreleased	May 28, 1999		
Lunar 2: Eternal Blue Complete	Game Arts	Working Designs	May 27, 1999	Unreleased	December 15, 2000		
Lunar Wing: Toki o Koeta Seisen	Shoeisha	Shoeisha	July 12, 2001	Unreleased	Unreleased		
Lunatic Dawn III	Artdink	Artdink	December 17, 1998	Unreleased	Unreleased		
Lunatic Dawn Odyssey	Artdink	Artdink	December 2, 1999	Unreleased	Unreleased		
Lup Salad: Lupupu Cube	Fupac	Datam Polystar	August 30, 1996	Unreleased	Unreleased		
Lupin III: Chateau de Cagliostro Saikai	Asmik Ace	Asmik Ace	January 10, 1997	Unreleased	Unreleased		

== Applications List (A-L) ==
Title	Developer(s)	Publisher(s)	Regions released			Ref.
Title	Developer(s)	Publisher(s)	Japan	Europe/PAL	North America	Ref.
1-Jikan de Wakaru Kabushiki Toushi	Game Stage	D3Publisher	July 26, 2001	Unreleased	Unreleased	
16 Tales	Lightspan	Lightspan	Unreleased	Unreleased	1996	
16 Tales 2	Lightspan	Lightspan	Unreleased	Unreleased	1996	
16 Tales 3	Lightspan	Lightspan	Unreleased	Unreleased	1996	
16 Tales 4	Lightspan	Lightspan	Unreleased	Unreleased	1996	
Baby Universe	SCEI	SCEI^{JP}, SCEE^{PAL}	June 20, 1997	October 9, 1998	Unreleased	
Buzzer Beater: Kouhen	SCEI	SCEI	May 27, 1999	Unreleased	Unreleased	
Buzzer Beater: Zenpen	SCEI	SCEI	May 27, 1999	Unreleased	Unreleased	
Carol the DarkAngel	SCEI	SCEI	April 2, 1998	Unreleased	Unreleased	
Chakusin Melody Damon	Ving	Ving	November 25, 1999	Unreleased	Unreleased	
Chakusin Melody Damon Gold	Ving	Ving	August 10, 2000	Unreleased	Unreleased	
Chakusin Melody Damon volume.2	Ving	Ving	January 27, 2000	Unreleased	Unreleased	
Chakusin Melody Damon volume.3	Ving	Ving	February 24, 2000	Unreleased	Unreleased	
Chakusin Melody Damon volume.4	Ving	Ving	April 13, 2000	Unreleased	Unreleased	
Cinema Eikaiwa: A Boy's Life	Success	Success	April 22, 1999	Unreleased	Unreleased	
Cinema Eikaiwa: Ai no Hate ni	Success	Success	July 22, 1999	Unreleased	Unreleased	
Cinema Eikaiwa: Arashi ga Oka	Success	Success	March 18, 1999	Unreleased	Unreleased	
Cinema Eikaiwa: Interceptor	Success	Success	March 18, 1999	Unreleased	Unreleased	
Cinema Eikaiwa: Tengokuni Ikenai Papa	Success	Success	January 14, 1999	Unreleased	Unreleased	
Cinema Eikaiwa: Zombie	Success	Success	May 27, 1999	Unreleased	Unreleased	
Click Manga: Dynamic Robot Taisen 1: Shutsugeki! Kyoui Robot no Gundan!!	Tokuma Shoten	Tokuma Shoten	September 30, 1999	Unreleased	Unreleased	
Click Manga: Dynamic Robot Taisen 2: Kyoufu! Akuma Zoku Fukkatsu	Tokuma Shoten	Tokuma Shoten	December 16, 1999	Unreleased	Unreleased	
Click Manga: Ginga Eiyuu Densetsu 1	Tokuma Shoten	Tokuma Shoten	September 30, 1999	Unreleased	Unreleased	
Click Manga: Ginga Eiyuu Densetsu 2	Tokuma Shoten	Tokuma Shoten	November 18, 1999	Unreleased	Unreleased	
Click Manga: Opera Za no Kaijin	Tokuma Shoten	Tokuma Shoten	September 30, 1999	Unreleased	Unreleased	
Creative Camp	Lightspan	Lightspan	Unreleased	Unreleased	1998	
Creative Isle	Lightspan	Lightspan	Unreleased	Unreleased	1998	
Creative Journey	Lightspan	Lightspan	Unreleased	Unreleased	1998	
Creative Voyage	Lightspan	Lightspan	Unreleased	Unreleased	1998	
Digital Ehon Vol. 1: Imadoki no Momotarou	Smilesoft	Smilesoft	September 12, 2002	Unreleased	Unreleased	
Digital Ehon Vol. 2: Imadoki no Kaguya Hime	Smilesoft	Smilesoft	September 12, 2002	Unreleased	Unreleased	
Digital Ehon Vol. 3: Imadoki no Sarukani	Smilesoft	Smilesoft	September 12, 2002	Unreleased	Unreleased	
Digital Ehon Vol. 4: Imadoki no Hanasaka Jiisan	Smilesoft	Smilesoft	September 12, 2002	Unreleased	Unreleased	
Digital Ehon Vol. 5: Imadoki no Urashi Matarou	Smilesoft	Smilesoft	September 12, 2002	Unreleased	Unreleased	
Eigo no Tetsujin: Center Shiken Trial	Sony Computer Entertainment	Sony Computer Entertainment	September 13, 1996	Unreleased	Unreleased	
Every Child Can Succeed 1	Lightspan	Lightspan	Unreleased	Unreleased	1998	
Every Child Can Succeed 2	Lightspan	Lightspan	Unreleased	Unreleased	1998	
Every Child Can Succeed 3	Lightspan	Lightspan	Unreleased	Unreleased	1998	
Every Child Can Succeed 4	Lightspan	Lightspan	Unreleased	Unreleased	1998	
Every Child Can Succeed 5	Lightspan	Lightspan	Unreleased	Unreleased	1998	
Every Child Can Succeed 6	Lightspan	Lightspan	Unreleased	Unreleased	1998	
Every Child Can Succeed 7	Lightspan	Lightspan	Unreleased	Unreleased	1998	
Family Connection Demonstration	Lightspan	Lightspan	Unreleased	Unreleased	1998	
Glay Complete Works	Exit	Oracion	April 16, 1999	Unreleased	Unreleased	
Golgo 13: Carlyle no Yabou	Daiki	Daiki	November 26, 1998	Unreleased	Unreleased	
Golgo 13: Mienai Guntai	Daiki	Daiki	November 26, 1998	Unreleased	Unreleased	
Head to Toe 1	Lightspan	Lightspan	Unreleased	Unreleased	1998	
Head to Toe 2	Lightspan	Lightspan	Unreleased	Unreleased	1998	
Head to Toe 3	Lightspan	Lightspan	Unreleased	Unreleased	1998	
Head to Toe 4	Lightspan	Lightspan	Unreleased	Unreleased	1998	
Home Doctor	Datam Polystar	Success	November 13, 1997	Unreleased	Unreleased	
Iceman: Digital Playstage	Sony Music Entertainment Japan	Sony Music Entertainment Japan	March 26, 1998	Unreleased	Unreleased	
Inu no Kaikata	Billiken Soft	D3Publisher	April 18, 2002	Unreleased	Unreleased	
Kain no Tanoshi Mail	The Second	The Second	February 3, 2000	Unreleased	Unreleased	
Kaishin! Derby Analyst	Media Entertainment	Media Entertainment	December 21, 2000	Unreleased	Unreleased	
Kaiteiban Mark Yagazaki no Seiyou Senseijutsu	Success	Success	June 28, 2001	Unreleased	Unreleased	
Kaiteiban Mark Yagazaki no Seiyou Shichusuimei	Success	Success	June 28, 2001	Unreleased	Unreleased	
Keiba Eight '98	Shangri-La	Shangri-La	April 29, 1998	Unreleased	Unreleased	
Keiba Eight '98 Akifuyu	Shangri-La	Shangri-La	October 22, 1998	Unreleased	Unreleased	
Keiba Eight '99 Haru Natsu	Shangri-La	Shangri-La	April 1, 1999	Unreleased	Unreleased	
Keiba Saisho no Housoku '95	Copya Systems	Copya Systems	June 23, 1995	Unreleased	Unreleased	
Keiba Saisho no Housoku '96 Vol. 1	Copya Systems	Copya Systems	January 13, 1996	Unreleased	Unreleased	
Keiba Saisho no Housoku '96 Vol. 2: G-1 Road	Shangri-La	Shangri-La	November 1, 1996	Unreleased	Unreleased	
Keiba Saisho no Housoku '97 Vol. 1: Nerae! Banbaken!	Shangri-La	Shangri-La	April 11, 1997	Unreleased	Unreleased	
Keiba Saisho no Housoku '97 Vol. 2: To Hit	Shangri-La	Shangri-La	October 16, 1997	Unreleased	Unreleased	
Keiba Saisho no Housoku '99 Aki Fuyu	Shangri-La	Shangri-La	October 21, 1999	Unreleased	Unreleased	
Keitai Eddy	Increment-P	Increment-P	July 27, 2000	Unreleased	Unreleased	
Kiseki no Maya Uranai	Oracion	Oracion	August 5, 1999	Unreleased	Unreleased	
Kurashi no Manner	Sol	D3Publisher	February 14, 2002	Unreleased	Unreleased	
LifeScape: Seimei 40 Okunen Haruka na Tabi	Scitron & Art	Mitsui Bussan	January 26, 1996	Unreleased	Unreleased	
Liquid Books: Amrita's Tree Credito and the Coyote	Lightspan	Lightspan	Unreleased	Unreleased	1996	
Liquid Books: Far-Fetched Frontier Tales	Lightspan	Lightspan	Unreleased	Unreleased	1996	
Liquid Books: Lety's Favorite Stories	Lightspan	Lightspan	Unreleased	Unreleased	1996	
Liquid Books: Pop-Out Prose	Lightspan	Lightspan	Unreleased	Unreleased	1996	
Liquid Books: The Adventures of Adelita and Bo	Lightspan	Lightspan	Unreleased	Unreleased	1996	
Liquid Books: The Wandering Path	Lightspan	Lightspan	Unreleased	Unreleased	1996	
Lulu	Tohoku Shinsha	Tohoku Shinsha	November 1, 1996	Unreleased	Unreleased	
Lupin Sansei	Daiki	Daiki	November 26, 1998	Unreleased	Unreleased	

== Bundles List (A-L) ==
Title	Developer(s)	Publisher(s)	Regions released			Ref.
Title	Developer(s)	Publisher(s)	Japan	Europe/PAL	North America	Ref.
Arc the Lad Collection	Working Designs	Working Designs	Unreleased	Unreleased	April 18, 2002	
Arcade Classic Shuu	Success	Success	April 24, 2002	Unreleased	Unreleased	
Army Men Gold: Collector's Edition	The 3DO Company	The 3DO Company	April 24, 2002	Unreleased	Unreleased	
Beatmania Best Hits	Konami	Konami	July 27, 2000	Unreleased	Unreleased	
Bishi Bashi Special (Europe)	Konami	Konami	Unreleased	July 7, 2000	Unreleased	
Capcom Generations	Capcom	Virgin Interactive Entertainment	September 3, 1999	Unreleased	Unreleased	
Card Game Shuu	Success	Success	July 25, 2002	Unreleased	Unreleased	
Crossword Shuu	Success	Success	December 20, 2001	Unreleased	Unreleased	
Dance Dance Revolution Best Hits	Konami	Konami	December 21, 2000	Unreleased	Unreleased	
Disney Action Games Collector's Edition	Traveller's Tales, Eurocom, Doki Denki Studio	Global Star Software	Unreleased	Unreleased	February 5, 2004	
Disney Collector's Edition	Paradox Development, Traveller's Tales, Crystal Dynamics	Disney Interactive	Unreleased	Unreleased	February 5, 2004	
Doko Demo Issyo Deluxe Pack	Bomber eXpress	Sony Computer Entertainment	May 24, 2001	Unreleased	Unreleased	
The Double Shooting: RayStorm x RayCrisis •Simple 1500 Series Vol. 75: The Double Shooting: RayStorm x RayCrisis^{JP}	Taito	D3 Publisher	October 25, 2001	Unreleased	Unreleased	
EA Action	Electronic Arts	Electronic Arts	Unreleased	Unreleased	2002	
EA Racing	Electronic Arts	Electronic Arts	Unreleased	Unreleased	2002	
EA Sports	Electronic Arts	Electronic Arts	Unreleased	Unreleased	2002	
Experience the Magic of Disney on PlayStation (1)	Psygnosis, Revolution Software, Eurocom	Sony Computer Entertainment	Unreleased	October 4, 2003	Unreleased	
Experience the Magic of Disney on PlayStation (2)	Traveller's Tales, Eurocom, Ubi Soft Shanghai	Sony Computer Entertainment	Unreleased	October 25, 2003	Unreleased	
Experience the Magic of Disney on PlayStation (3)	Argonaut Games, Eurocom	Sony Computer Entertainment	Unreleased	2003	Unreleased	
Final Fantasy Anthology	Square	Square	Unreleased	Unreleased	September 30, 1999	
Final Fantasy Anthology: European Edition	Square	Sony Computer Entertainment	Unreleased	May 1, 2002	Unreleased	
Final Fantasy Chronicles	Square	Square Electronic Arts	Unreleased	Unreleased	June 29, 2001	
Final Fantasy Collection	Squaresoft	Square	March 11, 1999	Unreleased	Unreleased	
Final Fantasy Origins •Final Fantasy I & II Premium Package^{JP}	Square	Square^{JP}, Infogrames^{EU}, Square Electronic Arts^{NA}	October 31, 2002	March 14, 2003	April 8, 2003	
Front Mission History	Square Enix	Square Enix	December 11, 2003	Unreleased	Unreleased	
Grand Theft Auto: Collector's Edition	DMA Design	Rockstar Games	Unreleased	December 17, 2002	December 17, 2002	
Grand Theft Auto: The Director's Cut	DMA Design	Rockstar Games	Unreleased	March 15, 1999	March 15, 1999	
Help Charity Compilation	Various	Sony Computer Entertainment	Unreleased	1996	Unreleased	
Le Concert ff+pp	SAME Creative Inc.	Warashi	September 7, 2000	Unreleased	Unreleased	

== See also ==
- List of PlayStation games (M–Z)
