= Hugo: Bukkazoom! =

2003 video game

- Developer: ITE Media
- Publishers: ITE Media; Namco
- Designer: Kim Krogh
- Programmer: Simon C. Mogensen
- Artist: Jesper Rønne
- Series: Hugo
- Platforms: Microsoft Windows, PlayStation 2, Game Boy Advance
- Release: Microsoft Windows, PlayStation 2: EU: 2003; Game Boy Advance: NA: March 2005
- Genre: Racing
- Modes: Single-player, multiplayer

Hugo: Bukkazoom! is a racing game developed by ITE Media and published by Namco for Game Boy Advance and ITE Media for PlayStation 2 and Microsoft Windows. It is part of the Hugo series and was released in 2003.

== Gameplay ==
Hugo: Bukkazoom! is a kart racing game in which Hugo and other characters from the franchise are shrunk to insect size and race karts styled after beetles and other insects through oversized countryside environments. Events take place in large open arenas rather than on lap-based circuits, with an on-screen arrow constantly pointing toward the next gate or objective; Jeuxvideo.com likened this structure to Cel Damage, with event types modelled on modes from first-person shooters.

The championship consists of five successive event types, which can also be played individually: a balloon race through moving gates carried by fleeing greenflies, a transport event in which players bring five greenflies back to their base, a standard race between gates, a capture-the-balloon mode, and a taxi event in which greenflies must be delivered to a set point. Free roam and time trial modes are available for practice. During events, players collect power-ups that hinder opponents and can stack them into stronger combined versions, with nine combinations in total. Nine characters are playable, each paired with their own kart, and most must be unlocked; the roster includes Hugo, his wife Hugolina, their three children, the witch Scylla, Fernando, Jean-Paul and Don Croco. The game supports one or two players.

== Development and release ==
Hugo: Bukkazoom! was developed by ITE Media, a Danish company known for its interactive television programming. The game was showcased at E3 2003. The PlayStation 2 and Windows versions were released in 2003; in France, the PlayStation 2 version launched on 12 December. In 2005, Namco and ITE Media partnered to publish the game for the Game Boy Advance in North America alongside Hugo: The Evil Mirror, and is aimed at players aged twelve and under. At the time, Namco believed that those two titles could be the first of many releases resulting from that partnership.

== Reception ==
Reception

Review scores
Publication	Score
PC Games	46%
Jeuxvideo.com	9/20
GameSector	7/10
Svet kompjutera	61/100

The game was poorly reviewed. Jeuxvideo.com criticized the controls which "made the gameplay too random", but noted that if the controls were done more precise, Hugo: Bukkazoom could have interested fans of kart racing.
