= Hugo: Quest for the Sunstones =

2000 video game

Hugo: The Quest for the Sunstones
- German cover art by Jørgen Trolle Ørberg
- Developer: ITE Media
- Publisher: ITE Media
- Designer: Piet N. Kargaard
- Programmers: Jesper Olsen; Morten Mikkelsen
- Artist: Claus Friese
- Series: Hugo
- Platforms: PlayStation, Windows
- Release: 11 March 2000
- Genre: Platform game
- Mode: Single-player

Hugo: Quest for the Sunstones (original Danish title Hugo: Jagten På Solstenene), also known as Hugo 3D, is a 3D platform game in Hugo franchise developed and published by ITE Media for the PlayStation and PC in 2000. It is also known Hugo: La Quête des Pierres Solaires in France, Hugo ja kadonneet jalokivet in Finland, Hugo: Das Geheimnis des Kikurianischen Sonnensteins in Germany, Hugo: Jakten på solstenarna in Sweden, and Кузя 3D: Тайна солнечных камней in Russia. The game was re-released in 2007 in the Best of Hugo series along with Hugo in Space.

== Gameplay ==
Gameplay on the PlayStation

Hugo: Quest for the Sunstones is a 3D platform game similar to Crash Bandicoot, with diamonds replacing the collectible apples from Crash. The player character can attack enemies by either jumping on them or hitting them with a whip Indiana Jones-style. There are also first-person perspective sliding sections.

== Plot ==
Hugo: Quest for the Sunstones takes place in the same setting as the "Jungle Island" program of Hugo show and its Hugo: Jungle Island video game adaptation series. The village of the island's cheerful native Kikurians is in great danger as the hateful witch Scylla has decided to get rid of them. The volcano near the village can erupt at any moment, since Scylla's minions clogged the crater with a huge boulder, threatening to flood the Kikurian village with lava. To save the Kikurians, the friendly troll Hugo must find three magic sunstones that are hidden in three locations: an old Inca pyramid, a snowy mountain cave, and an old pirate grotto. Once Hugo succeeds in collecting all the sunstones, he is captured and now he has to escape from Scylla's dungeon and finish his task. If he does it too, the eruption is stopped at the last moment and the village is saved, the evil Scylla gets pulled into a tornado that she had summoned, and the Kikurians and Hugo celebrate his victory.

== Reception ==
The game was relatively well received in its native Denmark, including the scores of a 3/5 from GamePage.dk, a 7/10 from PSSite.dk, a 7/10 from GameSector.dk, and an 8/10 from Spilzonen.dk. Its critical reception was however much worse in France, where review scores included 3/10 from Joypad and a 3/10 from PSone Magazine, and in Germany, where review scores included a 30% from PSG, a 35% from PowerStation, a 42% from PC Player, a 56% from Play Zone, and a 7.9/10 from GameZone.de.

== See also ==
- Hugo: Black Diamond Fever, a direct sequel to the game.
- Other Hugo video games
