= Hugo Retro Mania =

2011 video game

- Cover of the German PC release
- Developer: Progressive Media
- Publishers: Krea Medie; Software Pyramide
- Series: Hugo
- Platforms: Android, iOS, Windows
- Release: Dec 15, 2011
- Genre: Action game
- Mode: Single-player

Hugo Retro Mania is an action video game in the Hugo franchise, developed by Danish studio Progressive Media and published by Krea Medie in 2011 for the Android system mobile devices. Its iPad version is titled Hugo Retro Mania HD. An update for the game was released in Halloween 2012. The game was also released on PC CD-ROM platform only in Germany as Hugo Retro: Zurück in der Mine by Software Pyramide.

== Game ==
Gameplay screenshot (French version)

The game is a remake of the 1991 Commodore 64 game Skærmtrolden Hugo, which was itself based on the first season (1990) labyrinth scenario from the TV game show Hugo, but featuring all-new graphics and gameplay system. Unlike the original, the game features the evil witch Scylla (here renamed as "Sculla" and accompanied by her servant Don Croco from the Hugo: Jungle Island), complete with a version of the "Rope" end game from the 1990s Hugo games and TV show.

== Reception ==
The game found 170,000 Danish customers in the first seven weeks on the market and was number one in countries such as Germany, Austria, Norway, Thailand, Chile, Turkey and Poland. It won the 2011 Best App Ever Awards in the Best Kids Game category, Android division. Since August 2012, it is now available for free at App Store.

== See also ==
- Hugo Troll Race
