= Hugo: The Evil Mirror =

2002 video game

- GBA cover art by Jørgen Ørberg
- Developer: ITE Media
- Publishers: EU: ITE Media; NA: XS Games (PS1); NA: Namco (GBA)
- Producer: Marit Abrahamsen
- Designer: Kim Krogh
- Programmers: Mogens Hvidtfeldt; Tim B. Laursen; Thomas Andersen
- Artists: Johnny Haarup; Claus Friese; Peter Eide Paulsen
- Writers: Elsa Søby; René Bidstrup
- Composer: David Filskov
- Series: Hugo
- Platforms: PlayStation, Windows, Game Boy Advance, Game Boy Color, Mobile
- Release: EU: May 2, 2002; EU: September 17, 2002 (Windows & GBA); NA: 2003 (PS1); SA: April 19, 2005; NA: April 24, 2005 (GBA)
- Genre: Platform
- Mode: Single-player

Hugo: The Evil Mirror (Danish: Hugo: Det Afskyelige Spejl) is a 2002 video game in the Hugo franchise developed and published by ITE Media for the PlayStation and Microsoft Windows, and in a different version also for the Game Boy Color, Game Boy Advance (also known as Hugo Advance), and mobile phones.

== Plot ==
The evil witch Scylla (Afskylia in the original Danish version) is back and has made a plan to rid herself of the troublesome good troll Hugo once and for all. She uses her powers to trap Hugo in the titular magic mirror that she then cracks it into three pieces and magically scatters the fragments across the world. Scylla also once again kidnaps Hugo's wife, Hugolina. Hugo and Hugolina's three children, Rit, Rat, and Ruth (Trollerit, Trollerat and Trollerut), are the only ones who can free their parents. To break the witch's curse, each child must find a piece of the broken mirror.

If the kids succeed in collecting the three shards, it will be the turn for Hugo himself to defeat Mirror Scylla and break the spell. After the won fight, Hugo gets out of his magical prison, saves Hugolina, and in turn traps Scylla inside her own magic mirror before completely smashing it into many small pieces, leaving the witch's dimwitted servant Don Croco struggling to put them all together and free her.

== Gameplay ==
Gameplay on the PlayStation

The PC and PlayStation version is a 3D platform game reminiscent of Crash Bandicoot. Each of three troll kids have different powers and their parts have different styles of gameplay. The girl Ruth can jump extra high, the boy Rat has a snowball gun bazooka, and the infant Rit rides on a wild boar. Once their parts are completed, a new path is opened in the mirror world, where Hugo himself has to escape from Scylla's castle before the final showdown with the witch. Unused content from the game included Hugo's house as the game's central hub and the location of Scylla's regular castle.

The Game Boy and mobile version is a 2D platform game similar to Bubble Bobble with elements of Rod Land and Lode Runner. It consists of three levels, each with 20 stages and ending with a fight against the level boss guarding a piece of the mirror. At the start of each stage, the player is tasked with eliminating all of Scylla's minions in it before the time limit runs out. Hitting any unprotected enemy with the freeze gun's beam for a few seconds will turn them into a block of ice that will shatter if pushed off a ledge or jumped on top of. Frozen enemies can be carried around and stack for gaining access to higher parts of the level or to creating even larger more powerful monsters in which to destroy in order to get the treasure contained within them (bonus points, save keys, and power-up upgrades to health and speed).

== Reception ==
Reception

Aggregate scores
Aggregator	Score
GameRankings	61.79% (GBA)
Metacritic	58/100 (GBA)

Review scores
Publication	Score
GameSpot	6.1/10 (GBA)
GameSpy	3/5 (GBA)
IGN	6.5/10 (GBA)

Hugo: The Evil Mirror received mostly mediocre reviews. Since the Hugo game show had never aired in the mainland USA, North American reviewers were often highly confused by the game's unfamiliar characters and backstory.

The PlayStation version was rated 5+ out of 10 by Polish magazine PSX Extreme and 45% by German magazine Players. The PC version received three stars out of five from Polish website Wirtualna Polska. Danish website Gamesector gave it a 7/10 for the PlayStation and PC.

Gamesector also gave an 8/10 for the Game Boy version, while German magazine big.N awarded it a 67% for the Game Boy Color, and a 68% for the Game Boy Advance. Its other Game Boy review scores included a 4.0 by Brazilian magazine Nintendo World, a 5/10 by Danish website GameLife, a 5.0/10 by Worthplaying, a 61% by German magazine Man!ac, a 6.6/10 by both GameCube Advanced and GameZone, and a 7/6/10 by Nintendo Insanity.

== See also ==
- List of Hugo video games
