= Hugo (video game) =

1991 video game

- Cover art of the 1995 PC CD-ROM release, also known as Hugo 3
- Developer: Silverrock Productions (ITE)
- Publisher: Silverrock Productions (ITE)
- Producer: Ivan Sølvason
- Programmers: Esben Hansen; Henrik Christensen; Martin Pedersen
- Artists: Niels Mortensen; Lars Mortensen; Torben Larsen
- Composer: Thomas Engell
- Series: Hugo
- Platforms: Amiga, Macintosh, Commodore 64, MS-DOS, Windows
- Release: 1992–2000
- Genre: Action
- Mode: Single-player

Hugo video game refers to more than a dozen video game adaptations of the early seasons of the originally ITE's interactive entertainment show Hugo in the Hugo franchise. From 1992 to 2000, ITE would develop and publish various compilations of different scenarios of the essentially one game, as well as their later updated versions, for several computer and console platforms, in most cases targeted exclusively for the European markets.

The classic Hugo releases from the 1990s are action games that closely resemble the early editions of the children's television game show that they are based on, having the player guide the titular character or a small, friendly troll to navigate safely through dangerous environments in a collection of diverse but simple minigame scenarios. Completing a given set of the main scenarios followed by the final end-game scene results in Hugo either rescuing his wife and children from an evil witch or finding a hidden treasure.

Since 2011, Krea Media (Hugo Games / 5th Planet Games) has developed a series of mobile game remakes of some the classic minigames turned into endless runners. A series of inspired online slot machine have been also released since 2016.

== History ==
=== Computer games ===
Two Amiga games, Hugo (originally titled Hugo - På Nye Eventyr: Del 1) and its sequel, Hugo 2 (originally Hugo - På Nye Eventyr: Del 2) were originally released in 1991 and 1992, and then ported to MS-DOS in 1992–1993. They were re-released as a 1994 compilation, Hugo (Hugo På Nye Eventyr), ported to the PC as Hugo 3 (international title) in 1995. Both games were similar to the children's television show of the same title where the contestant would try to completes arcade sequences to collect points and avoid obstacles using a phone, and the ending minigames are identical to the ones seen on TV.

Later Windows releases have included Hugo 4 (1996, originally Hugo: Äventyret Går Vidare), Hugo 5 (1997), and Hugo 6: Wild River (1998), as well as their updated compilations Hugo Gold (1998), Hugo Platin (1999) and Hugo XL (1999). Furthermore, several of the releases were partially incorporated into 2000's Hugo - Die Geburtstagsparty and Hugo Safari (both of which were also based on newer Hugo works) and the Hugo Classic Collection (compiling the first titles). The latter consisted of seven or eight releases (depending on country), including Hugo Classic 1-4 based on the original series (in addition to Hugo Classic 5-6 based on the Hugo: Jungle Island series).

=== Console games ===
Hugo 2 (PlayStation)
- Cover of the 1999 PlayStation game Hugo 2
- Developer: ITE Media
- Publisher: ITE Media
- Producers: Ivan Sølvason; Lars Jensen; Piet Kargaard
- Designers: Mario Gomes; Peter Paulsen; Poul Madsen
- Artists: Claus Friese; Chadi Freigeh; John Madsen
- Composers: David Filskov; Christian Jensen; Klaus Nielsen
- Platform: PlayStation
- Release: EU: May 1999

The two PlayStation games, which reused the titles Hugo (1998) and Hugo 2 (1999), are partial remakes of the computer games. They feature the same scenarios but with improved graphics and sound (including musical tracks for each stage), plus a rendered opening animation in the second game. An early concept was more ambitious, promising "a new storyline for Hugo and special new scenarios using both 2D and 3D technology".

Hugo was also ported by Laguna and Infogrames to the Game Boy as Hugo 2 in 1997. This version features simplified graphics and gameplay and was later ported to the Game Boy Color by Bit Managers and Infogrames in 1999 under the title Hugo 2½.

== Plot ==
In the games' usual story, an evil witch named Scylla (often named differently in various countries, including Afskylia in the original Danish version) arrives at the home of Hugo the troll and once again kidnaps his wife Hugoline and their three young children (Rit, Rat and Rut) because she needs them for a magical beauty treatment. Now, Hugo must undergo a series of dangerous adventures to reach and rescue Hugolina and the children, and perhaps even to bring peace to the Troll Forest after ridding it of Scylla. The witch watches Hugo's progress through a crystal ball and casts spells to stop him, having previously placed all sorts of traps in the various paths leading to one of her several "Skull Cave" lairs. Typically, if Hugo reaches Scylla's hideout, he then has to face her. Successfully finishing the game ends with Hugo's family freed and Scylla either defeated or escaped (the result depending on a sheer chance). Some versions also feature alternative ending sequences that may not even feature Scylla at all.

The PlayStation version Hugo 2 is unique in that the game's story continues from where the first one left off, where Hugo's family has been rescued but Scylla is back for revenge after having fled to her castle. As Hugo is returning home in an old airplane with his loved ones, the witch casts a spell to gain power over the clouds to take Hugolina again and destroy the plane. Hugo's children all parachute down before his plane crash lands in the snowy mountains. Once again, Hugo needs to again overcome many dangers that lie before him to save his wife from Scylla who will use traps and magic to stop him. This time, however, Hugo will also need to first find each of his three missing children before going to save Hugolina.

The mobile version Hugo 2 / Hugo 2½ is distinctive as well. In it, Scylla has captured Hugo himself, and now he must escape from her and reunite with Hugolina.

== Gameplay ==
The player must complete a number of minigames composed of repeative quick time events, simple puzzles, and guessing games. Most of them use either 2D or 2.5D graphics and have the character of Hugo controlled with keyboard or joystick input as he uses a variety of means of transportation to traverse through levels. Hugo will typically start each scenario with three lives, triggering a relevant cutscene when any is lost. During the games Hugo (voiced in Danish by Michael Brockdorf and German by Michael Habeck, Oliver Grimm and Oliver Baier) and Scylla (voiced in Danish by Winnie Engell and in German by Karin Kernke) communicate with the player with digitized speech, and can also knock on (or scratch) the screen from the inside, breaking the fourth wall.

=== Minigames ===
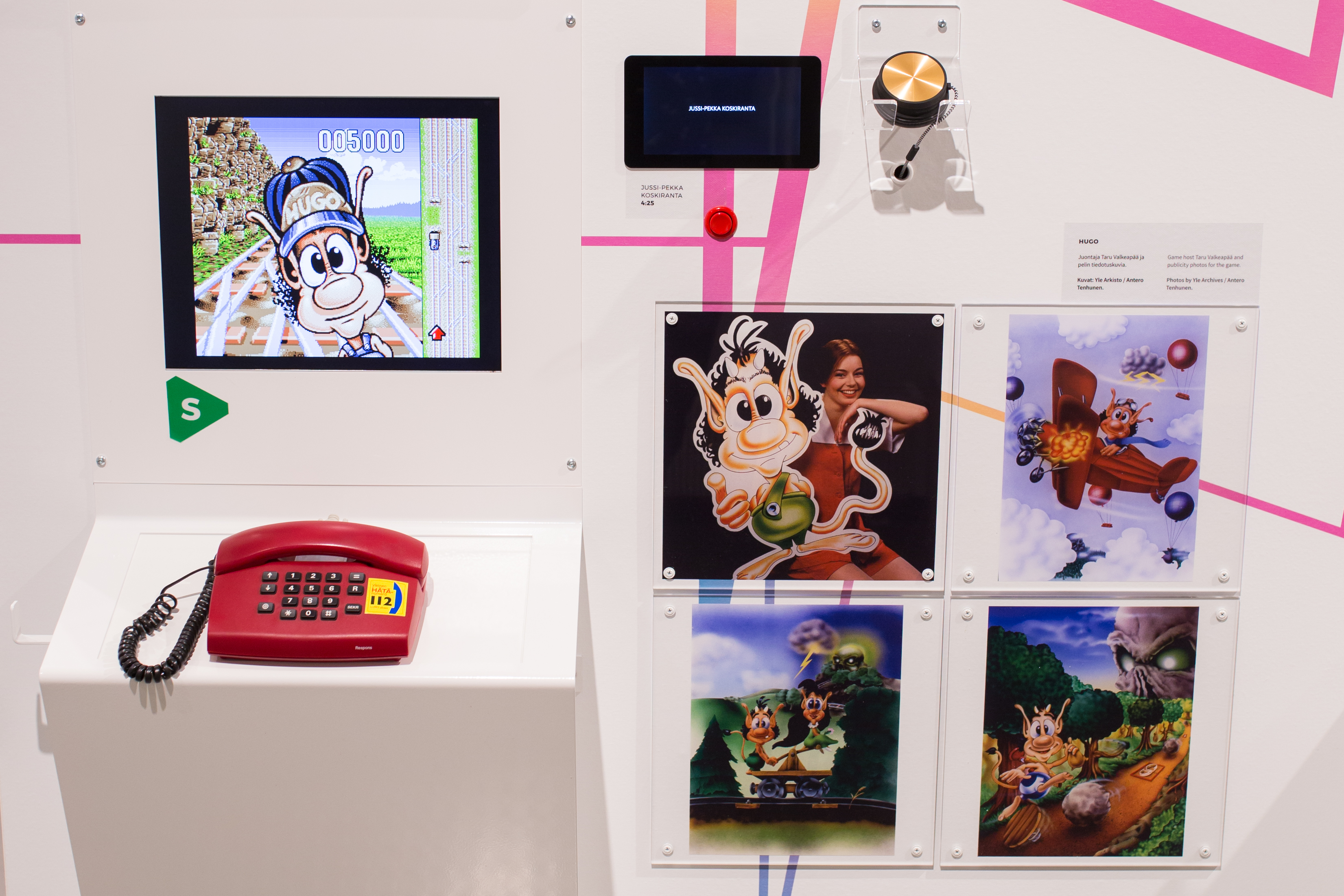
Hugo exhibition at the Finnish Museum of Games, showcasing "Plane", "Handcar", and "Forest" scenario artworks as well as "Handcar" ready to play on the screen.

In order of release:

- "Labyrinth": Hugo must find his way through an underground labyrinth, avoiding dynamite and mined wagons, before a box of TNT destroys the maze. Completing the main section will have Hugo cross a dangerous hanging bridge before facing three doors, one of which leads to a treasure room. It has first appeared in Skærmtrolden Hugo, the original Hugo game released for the Commodore 64, Amiga and MS-DOS in 1990-1991. It was reused in Hugo Gold and Hugo Die Geburtstagsparty, and was later remade as Hugo Retro Mania.
- "Handcar" (or "Train"): Hugo finds an old train track leading to Scylla's lair. The player helps the troll and his handcar reach their destination by changing tracks, dodging oncoming steam locomotives sent by Scylla, and collecting bags of gold. It was featured in Hugo - På Nye Eventyr and Hugo I/II (PC), Hugo Gold, Hugo XL, Hugo Die Geburtstagsparty, and Hugo Classic 1 (PC), Hugo (PlayStation). It was remade as Hugo Troll Race.
- Airplane" (or "Plane"): Hugo flies a biplane through a Scylla-summoned thunderstorm, avoiding lightning clouds and bomb-carrying balloons while collecting gold. It was featured in Hugo - På Nye Eventyr Del 2 and Hugo I/II (PC), and was remade for Hugo Gold, Hugo XL, Hugo Safari, Hugo Classic 1, and Hugo (PlayStation). It was also featured in a remade form in Hugo: The Magic Journey.
- "Forest": Hugo wanders through the forest in a search for Scylla's hideout while avoiding traps set up by her. The witch also sends a storm cloud over the forest once she finds out that he is on his way (with that, the entire forest turns dark and evil). It was featured in Hugo - På Nye Eventyr Del 2 and Hugo I/II (PC), Hugo Gold, Hugo XL, Hugo Classic 1 and Hugo (PlayStation). It was remade for Hugo Rainforest with all new graphics and different obstacles (similar to these in "Swamp"), and scrolling left and not right. This version was also included in Hugo Classic 4.
- "Mountaineering" (or "Mountain"): Hugo runs up around a mountain on a cliff path to the lair at the peak while dodging huge rolling stones and chasms and trying to collect dangerously enticing bags of gold. It was featured in Hugo - På Nye Eventyr, Hugo I/II (PC), Hugo Gold, Hugo XL, Hugo Safari, Hugo Classic 1, and Hugo (PlayStation).
- "Minetrack": Hugo enters a small minecart and wheels down an old shaft in search of an entry to Scylla's lair, avoiding obstacles in the ceiling and corridors and collecting gold. It was featured in Hugo 6, Hugo Die Geburtstagsparty, Hugo Classic 4, and Hugo 2 (PlayStation).
- "Scuba": Hugo dives through a river, avoiding water creatures and collecting treasure chests. He has to keep surfacing to replenish his air, and to always turn the right way to avoid waterfalls. It was featured in Hugo 3, Hugo Gold, Hugo XL, and Hugo (PlayStation).
- "Ice Cavern": Hugo found a secret back entrance to the witch's lair, but he first needs to cross a large chasm by jumping through moving ice pillars while collecting three magic items, whose order must be memorized correctly to open the door upon reaching it. He also needs to constantly keep moving as to avoid triggering the traps. It was featured in Hugo 3 (PC), Hugo Gold, Hugo 2 (PlayStation), Hugo Platin, and Hugo Die Geburtstagsparty.
- "Lumberjack": Hugo floats downstream on floating logs, hopping between logs to avoid branches and collect sacks of gold. If Hugo stays on a log for too long, he will lose balance. It was featured in Hugo 3, Hugo Gold, Hugo XL, and Hugo (PlayStation).
- "Skateboard": Hugo skates down a wooden half-pipe while avoiding boulders, bridge holes and beaver dams, and collecting bags of gold. It was featured in Hugo 3, Hugo Gold, Hugo XL, Hugo Die Geburtstagsparty, and Hugo (PlayStation). It was also completely remade for Hugo Troll Race 2.
- "Balloon": Hugo steers a hot-air balloon down by a river canyon while avoiding obstacles. When his balloon punctures, Hugo has to make an emergency landing at the bottom of a ravine without touching the cliffs. It was featured in Hugo 4, Hugo Platin, and Hugo Classic 2 (PC).
- "Dolmen Cave": A revised "Labyrinth" scenario where Hugo navigates a haunted underground maze to reach the mountaintop and enter Scylla's lair there from below. The player must find the right path quickly, avoiding dangers, to reach the lift before Scylla floods the maze and drowns him. It was featured in Hugo 4, Hugo Platin, Hugo Die Geburtstagsparty, and Hugo Classic 2 (PC).
- "Moor" (or "Swamp"): Scylla's hideout is surrounded by a spooky swamp that Hugo needs to cross, avoiding mud holes and birds while being chased by a flock of bats, before solving a puzzle to open a gate. It was featured in Hugo 6, Hugo Classic 4, and Hugo 2 (PlayStation).
- "Snowboard": Hugo snowboards down a hill through a half-tunnel towards Scylla, but the witch knows Hugo's plans and has caused an avalanche, adding a ticking clock to the game. The path often splits, leaving some dead ends and passing through fast and slow slopes as Hugo swings on his snowboard to avoid rolling giant snowballs while collecting gold. It was introduced in Hugo 4, then was remade twice, first for both Hugo Platin and Hugo Classic 2, and then for Hugo 2 (PlayStation).
- "Nimbus" (or "Motoracer"): Riding a Nimbus motorcycle, Hugo navigates an old mountain road while dodging goats, potholes, rocks and other obstacles. Along the way, the player also must collect gasoline and to keepi an eye on the map and directing Hugo. It was featured in Hugo 4, Hugo Platin, Hugo Die Geburtstagsparty, and Hugo Classic 2. It was also one of the cut levels from Hugo 2 for the PlayStation.
- "Parachute": Hugo is launched from a catapult to parachute onto the witch's lair on a small isle, avoiding birds, bomb-carrying balloons and storm clouds while collecting bags of gold. It was featured in Hugo 5, Hugo Platin, and Hugo Classic 3 for PC. It was also one of the cut levels from Hugo 2 for the PlayStation.
- "Sledge": Hugo sleds down a hill, avoiding dynamites, birds, snowmen and snowballs while collecting bags of gold. It was featured in Hugo 5, Hugo Platin, Hugo Classic 3, and Hugo 2 (PlayStation).
- "Cliffhanger": Hugo climbs a volcano wall while avoiding fiery gargoyles, fireball lava eruptions and planted explosives, and collecting bags of gold. He also must reach the top before Scylla flies there first. It was featured in Hugo 5, Hugo Platin, Hugo Die Geburtstagsparty, Hugo Classic 3, and Hugo 2 (PlayStation).
- "Log Bridge": Hugo crosses a gorge by hopping across flat-topped tree trunks and an oddly-placed bridge while avoiding dynamites, beavers and steel traps. On the edge of the track, owls and frogs appear in a specific order that the player has to memorize. It was featured in Hugo 5, Hugo Platin, and Hugo Classic 3.
- "Rolling Stones": Hugo (running towards the screen) flees from enormous boulders, avoiding obstacles such as dead ends, tree roots and lava pits. If Hugo runs out of time, a fuse lit by Scylla will reach a powder barrel to blow up the rope bridge, but along the way he also has to find a clue on how to open the gate to her lair after safely crossing the bridge. It was featured in Hugo 6 and Hugo Classic 4. It was also one of the cut levels from Hugo 2 for the PlayStation. The scenario was almost completely remade for the end-level boss fights against Scylla in Hugo Troll Race 2.
- "Wild River": Hugo rides a barrel downstream a river, leading right into Scylla's lair, while avoiding whirlpools and boulders. There are waterfall sections during which Hugo must shut the lid of his barrel and direct himself left or right, using a map to find his way. It was featured in Hugo 6, Hugo Die Geburtstagsparty and Hugo Classic 4. It was also one of the cut levels from Hugo 2 for the PlayStation.

Hugo for the PlayStation also features the "Volcano" scenario from the Jungle Island show as a hidden bonus minigame.

=== Endgames ===
Comparison of the pixel art graphics of the 1991 Hugo game and its vector graphics-based 2011 remake, in the "Ropes" end minigame

If the player manages to complete the given minigames and reach the final destination, Hugo proceeds to one of the final minigames serving as a bonus stage:

- "Rope" (or "Skull Cave"): The original and most-recurring end scene of the games featuring Scylla, as Hugo arrives in front of the witch holding his family captive in a cage. Hugo must guess-select the correct one of three ropes in a chance defeat her in a purely luck-based scene. Two of the ropes will always free Hugo's family but vary on the fate of Scylla, who will either transform herself into an eagle to fly away, which doubles the overall score points, or she will end up magically tied up with a rope and promptly ejected head-first out of window from a spring launcher, tripling the score in the best outcome (some versions give a set amount of up to 2026 additional points instead of multiplying the score when winning). If Hugo chooses incorrectly, however, it is him who will end up bound and launched out from the lair the same manner, the critical failure leaving the game's score unchanged. It appeared in Hugo - På Nye Eventyr, Hugo I/II(PC), Hugo 3, Hugo 4, Hugo 5, Hugo 6, Hugo Gold, Hugo Platin, Hugo XL, Hugo Die Geburtstagsparty, Hugo Safari, Hugo Rainforest, Hugo (PlayStation), and Hugo Classic 1-4, and in revised form in Hugo Retro Mania, also making appearances in the Hugo online slot games.
- "Key": Hugo must select the correct key to open Scylla's treasure chest. If he guesses incorrectly or takes too long to choose, one of two traps will activate and capture him. It appeared in Hugo 3, Hugo 4, Hugo 5, Hugo 6, Hugo Gold, Hugo Platin, Hugo Die Geburtstagsparty, Hugo Safari and Hugo Classic 1-4.
- "Lightning Bolt" (or "Witch"): Hugo must hop through a large chessboard to collect a key and open a door to Scylla's treasure chamber in her castle (Hugolina's dungeon cell in the second PlayStation game), avoiding lightning bolt spells being cast by the witch from a balcony above with all the remaining lives left from the main game at his disposal. Some versions include time limit in form of a fuse bomb, others have gold bags to be optionally collected. It appeared in Hugo 3, Hugo 4, Hugo 5, Hugo 6, Hugo Gold, Hugo Platin, Hugo Die Geburtstagsparty, Hugo Safari, Hugo 2 (PlayStation), and Hugo Classic 1-4.

Some games feature alternative final minigames that do not take place in Scylla's lair:

- "Apple Harvest": After an encounter with a hologram Scylla, two of Hugo's children throw apples from a tree while Hugo tries to catch enough in a basket to make juice. It appeared in Hugo Platin.
- "Magic Hands": A shell game in which the player watches one of Hugo's children, Rut, place a bead under a shell and shuffle several shells and must select the shell with the bead under it. It appeared in Hugo Platin and Hugo XL and was hidden in Hugo for the PlayStation (the player needs to complete the game in arcade mode, collecting all bonus, then successfully complete the Ropes end scene without letting Scylla flee).
- "Fireflies": This endgame was only released for TV show. In this game, Hugo wants to read a book about a firefly when his light went out. After that, he goes to the forest to collect some fireflies. The player needed control Hugo to the left side of the firefly and collect it with his net, then give it to beaver in his magic cup. When the time ends, player sees how many fireflies he collected.

== Reception ==
Reception

Aggregate score
Aggregator	Score
Metacritic	38/60 (Hugo PC '92); 75% (Hugo 2 PC '93)

Review scores
Publication	Score
Consoles +	1/10 (Hugo PS); 3/10 (Hugo 2 PS)
M! Games	25% (Hugo 2 PS)
Mega Fun	34% (Hugo 2 PS)
PlayStation Official Magazine – UK	2/10 (Hugo PS)
PC Games (DE)	107/400 (Hugo PC '95)
Superjuegos	59% (Hugo PS)
Video Games (DE)	25% (Hugo PS); 19% (Hugo 2 PS)
Amiga Games	62% (Hugo Amiga '94)
Amiga Joker; PC Joker	62% (Hugo Amiga '94); 33% (Hugo PC '95)
COMPuter	56% (Hugo Amiga '92); 30% (Hugo 2 Amiga)
Datormagazin	1/5 (Hugo Amiga '94)
NEO Plus	5/10 (Hugo 2 PS)
PC Player	14% (Hugo 6); 14% (Hugo XL)
PCManía	280/400 (Hugo PC '92); 345/400 (Hugo PC '93)
Play PlayStation	3/10 (Hugo PS)
Play Time	70% (Hugo PC '95)
Play Zone	50% (Hugo PS); 51% (Hugo 2 PS)
PlayStation das Fun-Magazin	5.7/10 (Hugo 2 PS)
PlayStation Games	28% (Hugo PS)
PlayStation Magazin	4.7/10 (Hugo PS)
Power Play	28% (Hugo PC '95)
Świat Gier Komputerowych	75% (Hugo Amiga '94)

The games received mixed and often negative reviews. According to Francisco Delgada from Spanish magazine pcmanía, while Hugo is "not a bad game", it is "a bit bland and repetitive, especially since the video game version only differs from television [game] in its difficulty". Arkadiusz Matczyński from Polish magazine Świat Gier Komputerowych recommended it as a "fantastic" game for younger Amiga users, but noted the more mature audience might get bored quickly.

PlayStation reviews were often much harsher. Mike Goldsmith from Arcade wrote about the PlayStation releases: "Advertised as being 'designed for children aged 6+', Hugo will come off as simplistic at best, patronising at worst - a real shame given the quality of edutainment titles that could be ported from PC and Mac". German magazine Maniac called them some of the worst PlayStation games. In 2003, PlanetStation, having previously given both Hugo and Hugo 2 the lowest possible score of 1 star, included Hugo among the five worst games from the 50 issues of the magazines. Retrospectively, PlayStation Official Magazine listed Hugo, described as "bloody rubbish", atop its list of worst PlayStation characters. In 2012, Game Informer made a Replay-section retro video poking fun at the PlayStation Hugo and Bubsy 3D.

Nevertheless, the series was a massive commercial success. The first PC game has remained Germany's #1 best-selling PC floppy disk game for a long time in 1995, including in March, June, July, October, and November, as well as the #1 best-selling Amiga 500 game of September 1996, while Hugo 3 landed #2 upon its premiere in 1996. Previously, Hugo has been one of the best-selling computer games in Spain in 1992. In August 1998, Hugo 2 for the Game Boy received a "Gold" sales award from the Verband der Unterhaltungssoftware Deutschland (VUD), indicating sales of at least 100,000 units across Germany, Austria and Switzerland. It was the #2 best-selling GB game in Germany in September 1999. As such, Hugo Gold has been featured as a Classic of the Month at the Computerspielemuseum Berlin.

== Legacy ==
=== Online slot adaptations ===
A Hugo online slot game based on the game was developed by Play'n GO in 2016 (in Denmark it was released exclusively for RoyalCasino.dk). Its story involves finding treasures in a mine and rescuing Hugolina from Afskylia/Scylla. It was followed by Hugo 2 partially based on "Ice Cavern" in 2018. The 2019's Hugo's Adventure features elements from the airplane and ropes minigames. Hugo Carts, inspired by the mine track scenario but having Hugo and Hugolina work together against Scylla, was released in 2021. Another slot game, Hugo Legacy, featuring mine track inspired theme along with a symbolic version of the rope endgame, was released in 2023.
