= OsWALD =

1988 Danish video game

- Developers: Starvision International (Amiga); SilverRock Productions (C64); Interchange Software (MS-DOS)
- Publishers: Starvision International (Europe); Centaur Software (North America); SilverRock Productions (Super OsWALD)
- Producer: Ivan Sølvason
- Designer: Jesper V. Jørgensen (Amiga)
- Programmers: Esben Krag Hansen (Amiga); Mikael Balle (Amiga); Søren Grønbech (Amiga); Marc Friis-Møller (Amiga); Thomas Villadsen (C64); Uffe Jakobsen (C64); Boris Jan Bonfils (MS-DOS); Bo Bendtsen (MS-DOS)
- Artists: Jesper V. Jørgensen (Amiga); Niels Krogh Mortensen (C64)
- Composer: Jens-Christian Huus (C64)
- Platforms: Amiga, Commodore 64, MS-DOS
- Release: 1988 (Amiga; OsWALD); 1989 (Amiga; Super OsWALD); October 1989 (Amiga; OsWALD of the Ice Floes); January 1990 (C64; Super OsWALD); 1990 (MS-DOS; Super OsWALD)
- Modes: Single-player, multiplayer

OsWALD is a 1988 Danish action video game released for the Amiga by Starvision International. It has a simple premise, based around a teddy bear jumping on ice floes. The game saw a release in the United States by Centaur Software as OsWALD of the Ice Floes in October 1989.

In 1989, an updated version was released, entitled Super OsWALD, which added a multiplayer mode. It was also published for the Commodore 64 and MS-DOS by SilverRock Productions in January 1990.

The game was produced by Ivan Sølvason and designed by Esben Krag Hansen, Jesper V. Jørgensen, Mikael Balle and Jesper Kyd for use as a game controlled over a push-button telephone for TV 2's Friday night prime time programme Eleva2ren. The game sold well in Denmark due to exposure in the programme. Running on an Amiga 2000, it allowed people to participate from home using the number keys on their landline telephone as controls. The programme also used the Super OsWALD version from 26 January to May 1990. Sølvason later designed Hugo the TV Troll along with Niels Krogh Mortensen, also for Eleva2ren and using the same push-button telephone concept.

== Gameplay ==
The player controls OsWALD, a blue teddy bear with a bow tie who has accidentally ended up at the North Pole, and must traverse a single straight path over the sea to the finish line, jumping from one floating ice floe to another without falling into the water. OsWALD is seen from a top-down vertical scrolling perspective. The rounded floes arrive arranged in three rows and flowing at different speeds. The player can only give the command to jump towards a nearby floe, to the right or left (with automatic diagonal direction if necessary), or forward. In the television version of the game, keys 4, 6 and 8 on the telephone were used.

In addition to jumping into the water, the player can lose a life if they slide to the edge of the screen or touch one of the enemies. Red whales pass along with the ice floes, which the player can normally use to jump over, but if they stay on top of a whale for too long, OsWALD will be sent flying by the whale's blowhole and lose a life. Other enemies include strange screeching birds that fly towards OsWALD and will fight with him, and Herbie, a Greenlandic recluse and Inuk hunter who arrives on a floe and can jump onto the one in front, freezing OsWALD if he touches him. Some floes have gift packages that the player can collect as bonuses.

The Super OsWALD version has a multiplayer mode that allows two players to play simultaneously, while the appearance and general functions of the title screen are left unchanged. The second character introduced in the game is OsWALDLine, a white female teddy bear and OsWALD's girlfriend. In the Amiga and Commodore 64 versions, the characters are both present in the game even in single-player mode, at least at the beginning of the game, with one of the bears as a computer-controlled character. The player can also collect a big "S", after which OsWALD or OsWALDLine will transform into a superhero, "Super OsWALD" or "Super OsWALDLine". The transformation also occurs if either player reaches the finish line with 10 packages. This leads to a 40-second bonus level in which OsWALD or OsWALDLine flies above the sea; the player can move left and right and must try to collect huge 100 krone banknotes, with mice riding on them like flying carpets, and avoid bombs. This will take the player to the end of the game if they can complete one final task.

== Development ==
In August 1986, Keld Jensen founded the first professional Danish game developing company, Kele Line, in Slangerup. The company later moved to Amager, which helped attract some young talented developers. The company released their first successful games, The Vikings and Tiger Mission, as well as two other games, Cyborg and Zyrons Escape. Their distributor, however, disappeared with all of the profits, which left Keld unable to pay his developers, causing a rift within the company. Ivan Sølvason (b. 1960 to Bjarne Sølvason), an editor for the Commodore 64 and Amiga magazine COMputer (also known as Det Nye COMputer), ran a hit-piece on Kele Line in the magazine. Several people left the company to form a new one in 1987, named Starvision International, with Sølvason acting in a managerial role for it. Starvision was an ambitious company at the time, having a branch in New York, releasing their first game M.A.C.H.: Maneuverable Armed Computer Humans, and having several games in development in 1988, including Gigaball, World Atlas, Mega Pinball (later renamed Super Pinball), Twin Ranger, Starfighter One, and Super Elite. (Note: Attributed to multiple references:) The developers quickly got tired of Sølvason's lack of participation in their work, and they had no cash inflow, which left M.A.C.H. as their only game, and Swiss Computer Arts would publish Gigaball (renamed Giganoid) instead. Most of the team left to work in the United States on Sword of Sodan at Discovery Software, leaving Sølvason in Denmark to continue the remaining projects.

One of Starvision's remaining games was OsWALD, then known as Snowberry, which was planned to be released in November and later December 1988. Starvision landed a contract with Nordisk Film to make an interactive game experience to be used in the weekly programme Eleva2ren on Denmark's newly launched television channel TV 2, which was set to begin broadcasting on 7 October 1988. Sølvason pulled together a little team consisting of programmer Esben Krag Hansen, graphics artist Jesper V. Jørgensen, and sound designers Mikael Balle and Jesper Kyd to develop the game. All of them were members of the Danish Amiga demoscene. Jørgensen came up with the concept of a teddy bear jumping about on blocks of ice and collecting gift packages, as well as a couple of quotes during gameplay with the voice provided by Sølvason, including one when he loses a life, "Det var vel nok ærgerligt. Vi prøver igen!" ("Isn't that just bad. We'll have another try!") According to Jørgensen, the developers tried to make the game look like a cartoon as much as possible, both in terms of sound and graphics. This was because there were groups in the population who were against computer games at the time, and could therefore perceive OsWALD incorrectly if they made it a traditional space shooter game or cheese game ("ostespil"). OsWALD was developed specifically for Eleva2ren during most of the summer and the early autumn of 1988, and sold to Nordisk Film for US $12,000. It ran on three Amiga 2000s (one used in the studio and two for running the programme) with video output, genlock and an RGB generator. The Amiga system used in the studio was hooked to a specially designed modem that allowed contestants to speak to the host from home, and at the same time send DTMF signals from the telephone keys to play. The modem and communication software were developed by Voice Communication in Holbæk, and Commodore Denmark provided the Amiga hardware, genlock interface and connection to Nordisk Film's studio systems and RGB generators. According to COMputer, broadcasting a telephone-controlled game on live television was a revolutionary idea, which at the time was not even known in the United States. The game never saw a release in Denmark for home computers, but was released on the Amiga as OsWALD of the Ice Floes through a U.S. company named Centaur Software in October 1989, along with World Atlas and Leonardo.

When OsWALD became a hit on Danish television, Hansen, Jørgensen, Balle and Kyd tried to renegotiate their contract with Nordisk Film without involving Sølvason, claiming that he never signed a contract with them. In an interview with COMputer, Sølvason stated that he founded SilverRock Productions in Copenhagen on 12 May 1989, which began operations while continuing the development of OsWALD. Nordisk Film asked for a sequel, and SilverRock agreed to stick with OsWALD, but develop a new updated version of the game named Super OsWALD, with a multiplayer mode. Despite the contract issue, the demoscene developers stuck around to work on the game, with Søren Grønbech joining in and doing additional programming. Sølvason and Ester Grønbæch Jørgensen provided the voices of OsWALD and OsWALDLine, and Marc Friis-Møller programmed the game's intro. Super OsWALD was SilverRock's first success. It had a widespread release in Denmark through Sølvason's connections to COMputer, and was sold to Nordisk Film for US $10,000. The demoscene developers, however, were swindled out of any compensation for their contract once again. According to video game preservationist Allan Christophersen, Sølvason was a narcissist and habitual liar who would take credit for his team's work while blaming them for anything that went wrong and being paranoid about people trying to deceive him. This resulted in him working at a different floor from everyone else at SilverRock, and the demoscene developers, fed up with Sølvason's deceit and narcissism, left to strike out on their own and work at other companies such as Innerprise Software, Zyrinx and IO Interactive.

SilverRock created the port for the Commodore 64 in 1990. The game was designed by graphics artist Niels Krogh Mortensen (who had done graphics for World Atlas), programmer Thomas Villadsen, and composer and sound designer Jens-Christian Huus. Villadsen knew a programmer named Uffe Jakobsen (who later worked on Hugo), who helped him with some timing and grid routines. In connection with an exhibition at the Copenhagen Post & Tele Museum, Jakobsen made a DTMF-to-joystick adapter for visitors so that they could play OsWALD via a telephone in the same manner as in Eleva2ren. The MS-DOS port was developed by Interchange Software, designed by programmers Boris Jan Bonfils and Bo Bendtsen.
