= Hugo Troll Race =

2012 video game

- Developer: Hugo Games
- Publishers: Krea Medie; Software Pyramide (PC)
- Series: Hugo
- Platforms: Android, iOS, Windows, Windows Phone
- Release: July 10, 2012
- Genre: Endless runner
- Mode: Single-player

Hugo Troll Race is a free-to-play endless runner video game in the Hugo franchise, developed by Danish studio Hugo Games (5th Planet Games since 2018) and published by Krea Medie in 2012. Its sequel and spin-off were released in 2015.

== Gameplay ==
The game is a 3D remake of the 2D "handcar" minigame from the 1992 Amiga game Hugo - På Nye Eventyr (released as just Hugo in an export version outside Denmark), which was itself based on the early 1990s scenarios from the TV game show Hugo. In the game, the player controls a member of Hugo's family escaping a pursuit by the evil witch Scylla and her minions. The player is driving a trolley to jump, dodge and tilt to avoid obstacles and collect gold coins. The gold can be then spent on power-ups and trolley upgrades, and to unlock additional content, all of which can be also bought via microtransactions. There is also a wheel of fortune type minigame.

== Release ==
Hugo Troll Race was released by Hugo Games A/S for the iPhone and iPad in early July 2012. It has been originally released as a commercial product, before switching to the free-to-play model. It was also released as Hugo Troll Race HD for the iPad, and a PC version was released by Software Pyramide in Germany.

An ice age theme was added in October 2012. In January 2013, a jungle theme came with an update and the game was made free to play. In the first Krea Medie Hugo merchandise, Adimex released a line of Hugo Troll Race themed bath products in 2013. In April, the game was again updated to feature a "TrollCopter" and new playable characters such as MicHugo TrollMacher, Snoop Troll, Indiana Troll, Agent Hugo, El Capitan, Sven Goldentroll, Hoshi Troll, Hugo and Hugolina. In July, the Surfer's Cove update added a sea scenario and two more new characters Aloha Troll and Nalu Troll. Further characters, stages, and vehicles were added later.

== Reception ==
Upon its initial release, Hugo Troll Race has been downloaded more than 1 million times in just three days, making it the most downloaded app in 25 countries and the most successful Danish game for iOS. The game received mostly positive reviews, although some were mixed. Some reviewers also pointed out to the saturation of the mobile market with similar titles such as Temple Run.

== Legacy ==
A spin-off skateboard-themed endless runner titled Ronaldo & Hugo: Superstar Skater (or Super Stars: Ronaldo & Hugo) and starring Cristiano Ronaldo was released in June 2015. An official sequel titled Hugo Troll Race 2 was soft-launched to test the market before its official release in Q1 2016. It introduces several new features, including boss battles against Hugo's archenemy Scylla.

== See also ==
- Hugo Retro Mania
