= Hugo: Black Diamond Fever =

2001 video game

- Cover art of the PlayStation version
- Developers: ITE Media; Kiloo ApS (Mobile)
- Publishers: ITE Media; Kiloo ApS (Mobile)
- Producers: Lars Rikart Jensen; Jacob Buck; Philip Mundt
- Designers: Kim Krogh; Johnny Haarup; Elsa Søby
- Programmers: Jesper Olsen; Christian Cordes; Nicolai Mouritzen
- Artists: Johnny Haarup; Claus Friese; Peter E. Paulsen
- Composers: David Filskov; Christian S. Jensen; Asbjørn Andersen
- Series: Hugo
- Platforms: Windows, PlayStation, Game Boy Color, Mobile
- Release: 2001–2004
- Genre: Platform game
- Mode: Single-player

Hugo: Black Diamond Fever (Danish: Hugo: Den Sorte Diamantfeber) is a platform game in the Hugo franchise that was developed and published by ITE Media for Microsoft Windows and PlayStation in 2001 as a sequel to Hugo: Quest for the Sunstones. In 2003, a version was also created for the Game Boy Color, which was ported by Kiloo for mobile phones in 2004. It was known as Hugo: Diamantenfieber in Germany, Hugo: Musta timanttikuume in Finland, Hugo: Gorączka czarnych diamentów in Poland, and Кузя: Алмазная лихорадка in Russia.

== Gameplay ==
Gameplay on the PlayStation

The PC and PlayStation version of the game is a 3D platform game resembling Croc: Legend of the Gobbos or Crash Bandicoot. As in the previous 3D entry in the series, Hugo: Quest for the Sunstones, the player character Hugo the troll has a whip to attack the enemies with. In contrast, the Game Boy Color and Mobile version is a 2D platform game more reminiscent of Bomb Jack.

== Plot ==
Hugo the troll's arch-enemy, the evil Scylla, has returned and this time has found a way to make herself the most powerful witch of all time and take over the entire world. For this, she requires a magic potion to be made from the rare black diamonds that are to be found only in the Jungle Island where the primitive native Kikurians live, so she enslaves them all and forces them to work day and night in search of the black diamonds. Scylla is now busy putting all of her magic into the production of the black diamond potion but she has deployed her henchman's Don Croco's pirate army to guard the island. The French version Hugo: Le Maudit Diamant Noir ("The Cursed Black Diamond") uniquely specifies that Scylla plans to summon a great demon.

Once Hugo's friend Fernando arrives a letter from the captive Kikurian village elder asking Hugo for help, the troll has no time to waste as he rushes to liberate them and stop Scylla's plan before it is too late. If Hugo manages to free all the slave workers and to sabotage the potion production by stopping the mine's conveyor belt and closing an oil pipeline, Scylla decides, against the advice of Don Croco, to speed up the process. This leads to the gradual collapse of the entire factory, as Hugo still needs to free the village elder and escape with him before everything blows up.

== Reception ==
Hugo: Black Diamond Fever has received mixed and often negative reviews. Danish website Gamesector.dk awarded it the scores of a 7/10 for the PC, a 8/10 for the PlayStation, and an 8/10 for the Game Boy Color. Other reviews included a 3/10 from both the Official UK PlayStation Magazine and the Oficiální český PlayStation Magazín for the PlayStation version, a 30% from GBX for the Game Boy Color version, a 31% from big.N for the Game Boy Color version, a 48% from PC Games for the PC version, a three stars out five from Wirtualna Polska for the PC version, a four stars out of six from MSN Games for the PlayStation version, and a 7.1/10 from GameSpot for the Mobile version.

== See also ==
- Hugo: Quest for the Sunstones, a predecessor to the game.
- List of Hugo video games
