= Throut and Neck =

Interactive television show

- Also known as: Garganta e Torcicolo no Paraíso das Ovelhinhas (Brazil)
- Genre: Game show
- Created by: MTV Brasil and Herbert Richers Entertainment
- Written by: Dan Dratch; Grant Taylor (United States)
- Directed by: Cacá Marcondes (Brazil); J.D. Orozco (United States)
- Presented by: João Gordo (Brazil); Rebecca Grant (United States); Mariano Peluffo and Rodrigo "Chopper" Bedoya (Argentina)
- Voices of: Guilherme Lopes (Portuguese); Wally Wingert and Matt Weinhold (English); Federico Kossoy and Luis Pesiney (Spanish)
- Countries of origin: Brazil; United States

Production
- Executive producers: Carlos Zalve; Adam Tyler (United States)
- Producers: Ana Manini and Fernanda Monte Claro (Brazil); Paul Block, Ken Ceizler, Adam Smith and Brian Frazer (United States)
- Running time: 30 minutes
- Production companies: Interactive Television Entertainment; Herbert Richers Entertainment

Original release
- Network: MTV Brasil
- Release: April 1, 1997 – December 31, 1998

Related
- Hugo

Throut and Neck (Portuguese: Garganta e Torcicolo no Paraíso das Ovelhinhas) is a Brazilian interactive television show that aired between 1997 and 1998 on MTV Brasil. It was the first program presented on MTV by João Gordo, the lead singer of Ratos de Porão. The program aired in the United States on Game Show Network in 1999, presented by Rebecca Grant; Argentina on Magic Kids in 2000, presented by Mariano Peluffo and Rodrigo "Chopper" Bedoya; and Colombia on Citytv Bogotá.

== History ==
The show premiered on April 1, 1997 and was a half-hour program, shown daily in the afternoon at 7 pm in an interactive game format aimed at children, teenagers and young adults. It was presented by João Gordo, and featured Garganta and Torcicolo, two unruly computer generated mutant monsters who lived on Ovine, a planet inhabited and ruled by sheep. The show had 2-minute minigames remotely played by two contestants via push-button telephone connection, where the monsters would get in each other's way, exchange blows, clash and throw sheep at each other, including "Gladiator Slam Night", "Sheep Slam", "Sheep Heaven", "Sheep Shoot-Out" and "Jousting". Players randomly chosen from among the callers would be tasked with controlling the characters on the screen by pressing digit keys on the phone. Whoever threw the most punches, killed the most sheep, avoided the most obstacles, and managed to escape from Ovine with the fewest injuries and lose the least amount of blood would win, while the loser would become a sheep.

The technology used in the show was developed by Danish company Interactive Television Entertainment, who used the same technology in programs featuring the character Hugo. The show used the Animation Mask System, a real-time motion capture technique invented by Bjarne Sølvason (father of Hugo co-creator Ivan Sølvason). The system could transfer an actor's body, head, eye movements, and facial expressions to the character on screen. The actors providing the voices of the characters wore a helmet containing sensors that would alter their voices, capture their facial expressions and translate them to the characters on the screen, though all of the characters' body movements had been pre-rendered in advance. The characters in the program were created by MTV Brasil, in partnership with Herbert Richers Entertainment.

The character Fudêncio was created for the program, and would later star in his own animated sitcom, Fudêncio e Seus Amigos.

After the show ended on December 31, 1998, ITE exported the program to other countries. On May 3, 1999, the series, named Throut and Neck, began premiering Monday to Friday at 10:30 pm EST/7:30 pm PST in the United States on Game Show Network, running for 100 episodes and ending on August 27 the same year. It was presented by Rebecca Grant and broadcast from Media City Teleproduction Center in Burbank. The show was sponsored by Miller Lite and Nintendo, with Game Boy Colors given away as prizes. Because of Throut and Neck's perceived connection, although tenuous, with video games, GSN soft-peddled the show's launch, especially during the weeks after the Columbine High School massacre, when video games were being criticized for their violence. The network even gave the program a TV-PG rating, mainly because of the sometimes suggestive dialogue between Grant and the play-along callers. ITE launched a website for the series, which also had a webstore that offered a variety of merchandise, including T-shirts, baseball caps and backpacks. A companion site was also created, which had more information about the show. On June 1, 2000, the show started airing at 8:30 pm (with a repeat at 7 am) on Magic Kids in Argentina, presented by Mariano Peluffo and Rodrigo "Chopper" Bedoya. The program also aired on Citytv Bogotá in Colombia.

== Characters ==
- Throut (Garganta) is a blue monster with a feather on each side of his head, straps on his mouth and a ponytail beard. He speaks in a deep, demonic voice. Voiced by Guilherme Lopes (Portuguese); Wally Wingert (English); Federico Kossoy (Spanish).
- Neck (Torcicolo) is a hunchbacked green monster with a long, pointy nose who wears a zebra outfit. He speaks in a high-pitched, screechy voice. Voiced by Guilherme Lopes (Portuguese); Matt Weinhold (English); Luis Pesiney (Spanish).
- Giselda is a young sheep. She speaks in a pitch-shifted voice. Voiced by Guilherme Lopes (Portuguese).
- Araci is an older sheep and Giselda's aunt. Voiced by Guilherme Lopes (Portuguese).

== See also ==
- Hugo, another game show produced by Interactive Television Entertainment
