= Hugo: Jungle Island =

Hugo: Jungle Island was an interactive television program that was created as an improved replacement of the early 1990s' original children's game show in the Hugo franchise. It was launched by ITE Media in Denmark as Hugo Vulkanøen ("Hugo: Volcanic") in January 1999, before being licensed to and broadcast in many other countries, usually simply just as Hugo. As in the original program, the players would remotely control the titular video game character by using their telephones, trying to help him reach and defeat an evil witch and win real-world prizes. Its gameplay was adapted into four PC video game releases.

== Television show ==
In the show's story, the friendly troll Hugo's arch-enemy, the evil witch Scylla (named Afskylia in the original Danish version), has moved out from a magical Scandinavia to the titular exotic island of her dreams, where she was joined by the crocodile pirate king Don Croco, the local tyrant in love with her. In order to stay beautiful, Scylla then again kidnaps Hugo's wife Hugolina and the children, but this time she keeps them captive in a cage in her new lair, located at the top of a volcano in the center of the island among the jungle, with all paths leading to it being filled with deadly traps as usual and also guarded by Don Croco's soldiers and plagued by crazed monkeys. Other locations include Incan ruins and a diamond mine. Hugo tracks Scylla to the island but she is ready for him and immediately shoots down his plane. Once again, Hugo needs the help of the program's watchers to rescue his family.

As before, television audience members randomly chosen from the callers to the program would remotely take control of Hugo using telephone digit button input in a series minigames in hope of winning various prizes. Aided and guided by the locals Jean Paul the chimpanzee and Ferdinand the toucan, and controlled by the game's player, Hugo goes through a series of different adventures (a crude "hugocopter" flight, wild ostrich jockey-ride, liana-climbing, volcano lava flood chase, etc.). In the victorious outcome, Hugo manages to free his family and capture both Scylla and Don Croco by sneaking up on them and either adding a shrinking magic potion to their wine or making a cage holding his family fall on them.

== Video games ==
Hugo: Jungle Island
- Developer: ITE Media
- Publisher: ITE Media
- Platform: Windows
- Release: 1999-2000, 2004, 2005
- Genres: Action, puzzle
- Mode: Single-player

A series of two video games based on it were released by ITE Media for the PC adaptation in 1999–2000, followed by the third game in 2004 and the fourth one in 2005. They were released under localized titles in various countries (such as Hugo Viidakkoseikkailu in Finland, Hugo: Dschungelinsel in Germany, Hugo: Tropikalna Wyspa in Poland, and Hugo: Vahşi Ada in Turkey). The games' content was later effectively re-released as the fifth and sixth volume in the Hugo Classic series. Some of other Hugo video games are also located on that island, including Hugo: Quest for the Sunstones and Hugo: Black Diamond Fever.

The Hugo: Jungle Island series' review scores included a three stars out of five from Wirtualna Polska and a 7.5/10 from Gry-Online for the first game, and a 15% from PC Games, 23% from PC Action, a 43% from PC Player, and an 8/10 from Gamesector.dk for the second one. The first two games reached the top of PC sales charts in Turkey.

== See also ==
- List of Hugo video games
