= Hugo: Cannon Cruise =

2004 video game

- Developer: ITE Media
- Publishers: ITE Media; Kiloo
- Director: Jan Hyldebrandt-Larsen
- Producer: Claus Adolph
- Designer: Kim Krogh
- Programmer: Thomas Andersen
- Artists: Johnny Haarup; Jesper Rønne
- Series: Hugo
- Engine: RenderWare
- Platforms: PlayStation 2, Windows, Mobile
- Release: 2004
- Genre: Platform game
- Modes: Single-player, multiplayer

Hugo: Cannon Cruise is an action game in the Hugo series and published by ITE Media in November 2004, for Microsoft Windows and PlayStation 2. The game was released in the continental Europe-only. A mobile version was released by Kiloo also in 2004; it is currently available for free.

== Gameplay ==
A gameplay adaptation screenshot from the PlayStation 2 version

== Plot ==
A legend tells of the enchanted Phoenix Tree in which only once for a thousand years a single apple grows. If one eats the apple after it has become ripe, his or her three wishes will be fulfilled. The evil witch Scylla strives for absolute power and eternal beauty, and because she was foiled many times by Triggy Forest trolls, she would love to see them wiped out. Now she sees her chance for all of her dreams to come true, and all she needs to do is to find the sealed cave of the ancient witch queen Iduna. Hugo the troll and his friend Fernando must defeat the witch's army of pirates and enter the cave before Scylla does, or else he and all the trolls will be gone forever.

If the player completes the game, Hugo manages to eat the apple just before Scylla could do it, but since he was unaware of its real power, he then unknowingly wastes all of his three wishes on trivialities.

== Reception ==
Reception

Review scores
Publication	Score
PC Games	64% (PC)
Wirtualna Polska	2/5 (PS2)

In its native Denmark, the PlayStation 2 version was awarded a score of 7/10 from Gamesector, and three out of six stars from Geek Culture.
