= Hugo (game show) =

Children's interactive television show

- One of many logos for the Hugo shows, this one was used by Kabel 1 in 1996.
- Genre: Game show
- Created by: Ivan Sølvason; Niels Krogh Mortensen
- Presented by: Nina Klinker Jørgensen (Denmark), various in other countries (including Andrea Molina, Carmen Sevilla, Hoàng Thùy Linh, Ivette Vergara, Julia Haacke, Karen Cheryl, Pedro Pinto, Sonja Zietlow, and Tal Berman, among others)
- Country of origin: Denmark

Production
- Production company: Interactive Television Entertainment

Original release
- Network: TV2
- Release: September 1990 – May 1995

Related
- Hexana (Germany); Stinky & Stomper

Hugo (Danish: Skærmtrolden Hugo, often referred to as "Hugo the Troll" in English) is a children's and family-oriented interactive television show that aired between 1990 and 1995. It was created by the Danish company Interactive Television Entertainment (ITE). Since its premiere on TV2, this popular one-player interactive game show has aired in more than 40 countries. The program's audience callers used their telephones to guide the titular character, a small "TV troll" named Hugo, through various simple video game scenarios. The game was played on the television screen, broadcast live from a studio with hosts commenting on the progress. Typically, the goal of the players was to help Hugo brave various dangers on his way to rescue his family, held by the evil witch Scylla. After either successfully finishing the game or failing, the contestants were then rewarded with real world prizes based on their performance. The show has been adapted into multiple video-game releases, as well as into various merchandise and other media in an extended media and merchandise franchise.

== Content and history ==
The program Hugo, created by Danish company SilverRock Productions, later known as ITE since 1992, was originally made for Nordisk Film. It was first aired on the Danish television channel TV2 as part of the program Eleva2ren in September 1990, following the earlier success of the company's previous game, OsWALD. The original Danish version, Skærmtrolden Hugo ("Hugo the Screen Troll"), proved to be an instant hit, achieving high average TV ratings of 42%, and aired continuously on TV2 for five years.

Between early 1990s and mid-2000s, Hugo has been licensed to more than 40 (43 as of 2007) TV shows around the world, beginning with the Spanish and French versions in 1992. Many international viewers believed that the program was native to their countries.

=== Production ===
Hugo was created by the Interactive Television Entertainment (ITE) founder Ivan Sølvason, who commissioned Esben Kragh Hansen to design a new game idea. Sølvason worked with animator Niels Krogh Mortensen and programmer Esben Kragh Hansen for Eleva2ren to replace their earlier game show OsWALD. The troll's character was originally portrayed by Michael Brockdorf, who developed the voice while serving in the Danish Army. Several others have since taken over the role of voicing the character, including Amin Jensen and Torben Simonsen. Hugo's wife Hugolina was originally voiced by Louise Engell, sister of Thomas Engell who composed the show's symphonic music and its 18-bit sound effects. Their mother, Winnie Engell, was the original voice of the antagonist Scylla, whose visual design was modeled after Hugo producer Sølvason's aunt Vivi Feltman. The game's early pixel graphics were created by Mortensen, assisted by his brother Lars, using the Amiga's Deluxe Paint.

The expanding company would keep developing the show's gameplay and basic assets, as well as computer hardware to run it on, for more than a decade. The rest of the content for each of the licensed programs, however, were produced locally by various companies in their countries, tailored by them for local audiences. Because Hugo and other characters spoke Danish only in Denmark, foreign viewers often believed their localised programs to be local inventions.

The program was initially targeted for the children audience between the ages of 4-14. Target age was alternatively presented as 2-12 and varied depending on the country in licensed content, such as 6–16 in Portugal and 6–14 in Vietnam, with some family (group play) or even adult editions.

=== Technology ===
The show featured a video game that was remotely played by a contestant via telephone connection. A player randomly chosen from among the callers would be tasked with controlling the titular cartoon character on the TV screen by pressing digit keys on the phone (either 1, 2, 3 or 2, 4, 6) which represented different character actions or storyline options; an optional easy mode would be turned on to show on the screen the button that needs to be pressed.

For Hugo and its related television program projects, ITE made the custom-built computer system named ITE 3000. It was able to convert any push-button telephone's dual-tone multi-frequency signaling (DTMF) into control commands for the characters in the game, allowing the callers to remotely interact with the action on TV from their homes during the live broadcast. This complex and difficult to use system was based on two Amiga 3000 computers combined with a new audio control system, MIDI sampler, and other hardware, all of which reportedly cost $75,000. Special versions had to be modified to fit the telephone systems in some countries, such as Spain.

The ITE 3000 was later replaced by the PC-based ITE 4000, which used a real-time motion capture Animation Mask System (AMS). The new system was invented by Bjarne Sølvason (father of Ivan) and could transfer an actor's body, head, eye movements, and facial expressions to Hugo's character on screen. The actor providing the voice of Hugo wore a helmet containing sensors that would capture his facial expressions and translate them to the character, but all of the characters' body movements have been pre-rendered in advance.

In 1996, ITE created a 3D graphics system for Hugo using Silicon Graphics' Onyx Reality Engine. A new technology for the real-time 3D animation of Hugo was unveiled in 2005 but was aimed only for export, specifically to Asian countries.

=== Setting and characters ===
The show's first season, which ran on Danish television for a year, featured only the titular cartoonish character placed in a computer-animated world. The protagonist, Hugo, was a friendly and small, yet brave and resourceful, cheerful Scandinavian troll of 220 years (still a young age for a troll), searching for a treasure in dangerous goldmine.

For the next season, the show was vastly expanded for new adventures at the request from Nordisk Film asking for more characters, adding Hugo's 215-year-old beloved wife Hugolina (Hugoline) and their three kids: Rit (TrolleRit), Rat (TrolleRat), and Rut (TrolleRut, Ruth in some countries), who were aged between 20 (toddler) and 50 (little child). Also added was Hugo's archenemy, the beautiful but hateful and cruel witch that would become internationally best known as Scylla (or alternatively Sculla) but originally was named Afskylia in Denmark (with several alternative names in foreign-language editions, such as Hexana in German, Maldicia in Spanish, Maldiva in Portuguese, Maldícia in Brazilian, Mordana in Croatian, Bosnian and Slovenian, Skylla in Swedish, Tarastella in Finnish, Cadı Sila in Turkish, and Simla in Vietnamese). In the story, Scylla the witch, a terrible menace of the realm of Trollwood (in which she had been trapped by a wizard long ago) and later also beyond, constantly keeps kidnapping the family of Hugo, who thus has to again and again try to rescue them and defeat her.

The subsequent editions gradually expanded on this concept to involve more characters of good (Hugo's friends) and evil (Scylla's minions) talking and humanoid or regular animals. Scylla remained the only (not counting the original scenario's old miner) in-game human character to be met within the game's fantastic take on modern Denmark, but many human characters were later featured in the 2000s Agent Hugo reboot video game series set in an alternative hi-tech world.

A new program format titled Hugo: Jungle Island (Hugo Vulkanøen; international working title Hugo Jungle) premiered in Denmark in January 1999, replacing the content of all the Hugo programs from that point (usually still as Hugo, with the subtitle Jungle Island limited to its video game adaptations). Its set changed from the familiar magical woods of northern Europe to a remote and exotic island somewhere along the coast of Peru, where Scylla has moved after once again abducting Hugo's family and built a new home for herself on the top of a volcano located in the center of the island populated by humanoid-crocodile pirates loyal to the witch and infested with mean monkeys that she sends after Hugo. The new version introduced several new major characters, such as Scylla's devoted chief henchman, Don Croco, and Hugo's local talking-animal helpers and guides, Fernando the toucan and Jean Paul the chimpanzee.

=== Gameplay and rules ===
The first season of the show introduced how the in-game Hugo would often communicate with the player to comment on the game's progress (in addition to the commentary by the show's live hosts observing in the studio), as well as to feature a variety of other animated and also voiced cutscenes, including humorous Hugo's death animations. The troll would navigate a maze-like old goldmine while avoiding dangers in a quest for hidden treasure, his movements controlled by the player through a press-button telephone.

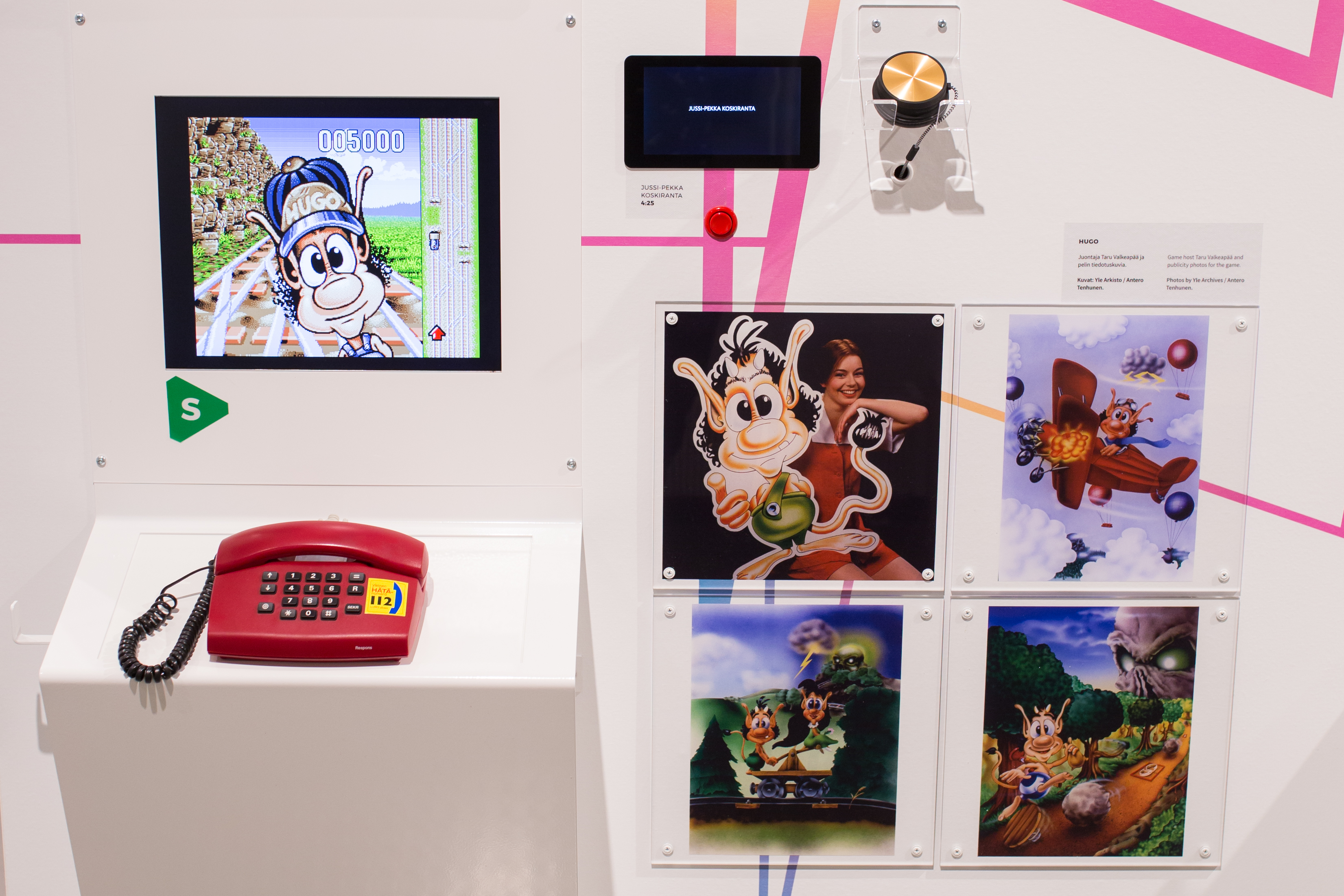
Hugo exhibit at the Finnish Museum of Games, showcasing the 1991 TV format, along with its video game adaptation playable with a phone controller

The globally familiar standard content of subsequent Hugo programs and their basic rules have been established in 1991 by the vastly expanded second season of the original Danish show. It now featured Hugo's dangerous journeys in search of his family, kidnapped by Scylla and held captive by her within one of her several skull-themed lairs. The contest's objective became guiding the on-screen Hugo through one of the given game scenarios (the choice between them could be left for the player to decide), typically of jump-n-run genre, to reach the lair before running out of his three lives. An either a two-dimensional (side-scrolling left to right) or pseudo three-dimensional (seen from behind Hugo) level represented a different adventure. Almost invariably, Hugo would keep constantly moving forward (for example, riding either a snowboard down a mountain or a skateboard on a half-pipe style dry watermill chute, or flying a biplane through a magical thunderstorm), while avoiding obstacles in his way and surviving the witch's magic and her assorted traps and minions. A failure to avoid any of the dangers caused the loss of one of Hugo's lives. Usually, the players had to react in the style back then seen as reminiscent of Dragon's Lair, albeit more repetitive but less scripted, quick time events requiring the caller to press the correct button in time. The game could sometimes become much more difficult to play due to input lag problems.

The game over state could be also triggered by running out of time (usually represented by either some sort of a deadly peril constantly chasing Hugo, such as an avalanche or a flood, or by his remaining amount of fuel or oxygen) or by entering an incorrect password-like puzzle sequence at the end of some levels (the latter required the players to first discover and memorize the solution, presented in the form of a particular set of three symbols randomised for each session, and then to enter it correctly). Failing in any of such cases would make the game end instantly, no matter how many lives have remained in reserve. Several scenarios further required the player to use a map of the level (with the time countdown continuing while checking it) as Hugo would have to keep choosing correctly between alternating paths, where choosing wrong would have Hugo eventually reach a dead end. While advancing towards the witch's hideout, the players were given an opportunity to collect the scattered treasure (initially mostly bars and bags of gold) to increase their game scores. Picking up rocks, on the other hand, would decrease the score.

During the course of the game, Hugo often gave various messages directly to the players in cutscenes, encouraging them with his rhyming catchphrases while breaking the fourth wall. Losing any of the lives would also play a relevant cutscene showing Hugo dying or being otherwise stopped in a cartoonish way, often uttering an encouraging or sarcastic line to comment on this. Scylla, watching Hugo through her magic ball, would loudly laugh at the player's minor mistakes (such as picking up bags of rocks decreasing the game's score) and occasionally react to Hugo's progress in her own cutscenes, activating traps or casting spells. The most iconic of such scenes involved the illusion of Hugo knocking on the TV screen from the inside when on his last life, and a similar animation of Scylla scratching the screen with her nails before taunting the player about Hugo being hopeless against her. Television hosts, meanwhile, also cheered on the callers, as would the live audience if any such were present.

After finishing the main game by either winning or losing (only winning in some versions), the number of score points would determine the value of the real-world prizes to be awarded to the player, which were calculated depending on the amount of gold and other valuables collected along the way, with any lost lives negatively impacting the score. Such prizes varied widely in the different programs across the world (in Poland, for example, even just the participation-award items were already valuable). Usually, several people would participate as players during the typical half an hour of airtime.

A potential large bonus awaited those who successfully reached the end of the given scenario(s). In the iconic climax scene, Hugo had arrived at his destination and now stood face-to-face with Scylla, who would present him a set of ropes hanging next to the cage with his abducted family. The player had to choose between three or four options where sheer luck would determine the outcome: depending on which rope was pulled, either Hugo managed to both save his family and supposedly defeat the witch once and for all (the truly game-winning best outcome, where she would be magically tied up and launched headfirst out of window of her lair from a spring device), or she would still triumph in the end after all (an alternative game over state with her capturing Hugo and disposing of him in the same way), or the family would be freed but she would get away (the canonical happy end with her turning into a bird to escape; some versions would also have her lose her youth and beauty and turn back into an old hunchback). Accordingly, the score was doubled (tripled in some versions), halved (erased completely in some versions), or left at its current state (doubled in some versions). Over the next years, not only various new scenarios but also alternative end scenes have been added to the show (and consequently also to its video-game adaptation series). One of them was no longer chance-based and involved Hugo having to steal the key to Scylla's treasure chamber while avoiding her lightning bolt spells.

Jungle Island featured all-different main scenarios and end scenes, with diamonds replacing gold as score items. As before, the game featured several varied scenarios full of traps, ending with the chance-based final confrontation with Scylla. The endgame had two different versions (choosing the correct magic elixir or pulling the correct lever), but with both of them this time having only two possible outcomes: Hugo would either fail entirely or he would sneakily free his family and defeat the witch and Don Croco (either magically shrunk and stuck in a reagent bottle or trapped under the fell cage), with no middle result. One particular Jungle Island scenario, set inside Scylla's weird magic mirror world from the 2002 video game Hugo: The Evil Mirror, was aired in some select countries such as Poland.

== List of programs ==
The Hugo shows airings in chronological order
Country	Date	Channel	Broadcasting schedule
Denmark (I)	7 September 1990 – May 1995	TV2	Friday
Spain	29 June 1992 – June 1994	Tele5	Monday-Friday
France	7 September 1992 – August 1994	France 3	Monday–Saturday (season 1) Wednesday (season 2)
Turkey (I)	March 1993 – October 1996	Kanal 6	Monday–Friday
Sweden (I)	March 1993 – December 1993	Sverige 1	Monday–Friday
Finland	17 March 1993 – 12 December 1995	TV2	Tuesday / Thursday
United States (I)	May 1993 – April 1994	Telemundo	
Norway	June 1993 – May 1995	TV2	Friday
Mexico	15 October 1993 – 30 April 2009	Canal 5	Monday-Friday
United Kingdom (I)	14 January 1994 – January 1995	ITV	Saturday
Germany (I)	17 April 1994 – December 1996	Der Kabelkanal / Kabel-1	Monday–Saturday
Israel	July 1994 – August 1997	Arutz HaYeladim	
Austria (I); Switzerland (I)	December 1994 – December 1996	Kabel-1	Monday–Saturday
United States (II)	15 January 1995 – ?	Telemundo Puerto Rico	
United Kingdom (II)	January 1995 – October 1995	ITV	Saturday
Slovenia	January 1995 – December 1997	TV Slovenija	Saturday / Sunday
Chile	12 June 1995 – December 1997	Televisión Nacional de Chile	Monday–Friday
Sweden (II)	21 August 1995 – December 1998	TV4	Monday-Friday
Brazil	30 October 1995 - 23 October 1998	CNT Gazeta	Monday-Friday
Bosnia & Herzegovina	1995 – 2004	Federalna TV	Monday-Friday
China (I)	February 1996 – ?		
Thailand	1 March 1996 – May 1998	Channel 7, TV 5	Monday–Friday
Croatia	1 April 1996 – 15 June 2004	HRT	Monday–Friday
Argentina (I)	4 November 1996 – 31 December 2005	Magic Kids	Monday–Friday
Ireland (I)	November 1996 - November 1997	TnaG / TG4	Saturday
Austria (II); Germany (II); Switzerland (II)	18 December 1996 – 13 December 1997	Kabel-1	Saturday
Denmark (II)	February 1997 – May 1997	TV2	Friday
Portugal (I)	24 November 1997 – June 2000	RTP1, RTP2	Saturday / Sunday, Monday–Friday
Russia (I)	2 January 1998 – 30 October 1998	RTR2	Saturday / Sunday
Ireland (II)	1998 – ?	TG4	Monday–Sunday
Switzerland (III)	January 1998 – July 1998	SF / DSR	
Germany (III)	May 1998 – 5 June 1998	Nickelodeon	Monday–Friday
Colombia	February 1999 – 31 January 2001	Canal Capital	Monday–Friday
Denmark (III)	February 1999 – December 2000	TV2	Monday–Friday
Austria (III)	March 1999 – ?	ORT	
Russia (II)	18 June 1999 – 25 August 1999	RTR2	Monday–Friday
Singapore (I)	13 January 2000 – 9 April 2000	Vasantham Central	
Serbia	28 February 2000 – 5 March 2004	BK TV	Monday–Friday
Malaysia	May 2000 – April 2001	NTV7	Saturday / Sunday
Poland	3 September 2000 – 28 February 2009	Polsat	Sunday, Saturday
Singapore (II)	December 2000 – January 2003	TV12	
Denmark (IV)	January 2001 – 31 December 2002	TV2	Monday–Friday
Saudi Arabia	January 2001 – December 2003	ART	Monday–Saturday
Portugal (II)	2 April 2001 – July 2001	RTP2	Monday–Friday
Turkey (II)	May 2001 – 30 September 2002	Show TV	Monday–Saturday
Venezuela (I)	November 2001 – June 2002	Venevisión	Monday–Friday
Denmark (V)	June 2003 – December 2004	TV2	Monday–Sunday
Bermuda	June 2003 – 2006	Fresh TV	
Turkey (III)	November 2003 – October 2004	Cine5	Monday–Saturday
Vietnam (I)	17 May 2004 – 30 June 2006	Hanoi TV; HTV7	Monday / Wednesday / Friday / Sunday
China (II)	26 July 2004 – ?	Guangdong TV	Monday–Sunday
Turkey (IV)	September 2004 – June 2005	ATV	Monday–Saturday
Venezuela (II)	March 2005 – February 2006	Venevisión	Monday–Friday
Romania	October 2005 – December 2007	Prima TV	Friday–Sunday
Vietnam (II)	2006 – 2008	Hanoi TV	Wednesday evening / Sunday afternoon
China (III)	26 January 2006 -	Hubei Province TV	Once a week
Argentina (II)	15 August 2016	Magic Kids (YouTube channel)	

== Local versions by country ==
Hugo never aired in South Africa because the local TV station involved in licensing negotiations demanded that ITE remove horns in all animations for all games, as their superstitious viewers believed that Hugo would appear as a demon from local beliefs. Hugo's horns also caused problems in the Middle East.

=== Argentina ===
Argentina's A jugar con Hugo ("Let's play with Hugo"), hosted on Magic Kids by presenter Gabriela "Gaby" Royfe, ran for seven seasons (343 episodes), winning a Martín Fierro Award for "Best Kids Show" in 2003. The program was produced by Promofilm, and its cast included Carlos Burgos (classic scenario), César Ledesma (1999 - April 2002) and Cristian Bello (until the end of the program) as Hugo, and Roxana Pulido as both Hugolina and Scylla. A paper magazine was also published for the show. In 2016, Gaby Royfe returned to host the program again, this time using the Internet and a mobile app instead of the original television and landline telephone. This 30th anniversary event was attended in-person by an audience of 1,600 and was watched by half million people on TV. She would later host Hugo show reenactments at other events. The Hugo format was also replicated in Magic Kids' own game show Kito Pizzas during the early 2000s.

=== Bosnia and Herzegovina ===
In Bosnia and Herzegovina, Hugo was aired from 1995 to 2004 on the country's public federal channel where it was hosted by Emela Burdžović, Mario Drmać and Elvir Hadžijamaković. Its voice cast included Mirela Lambić as Hugolina.

=== Brazil ===
Brazil's Hugo Game, aired on CNT Gazeta, at a time when the two stations were sharing operations, peaked at 500% above the expected rating level, with the record of 1.8 million callers in a single day, resulting in fires at two overwhelmed telephone exchange offices. The program was directed by Herbert Richards and hosted by Mateus Petinatti and Vanessa Vholker, who were later replaced by Andréa Pujol and Rodrigo Brassoloto. Instead of a troll, the country's version of Hugo's character was presented as a duende. At first, he was played by an animatronic puppet, later only appearing on the studio screens, and was voiced by Orlando Viggiani. The program was wiped along with the bulk of CNT's content from the 1990s, as the network used an expensive recording system from JVC, making it hard to archive.

=== Chile ===
Hugo was a success in Chile, where it was quickly extended from a 15-minute segment to 30 minutes in the latter half of 1995, before eventually receiving a daily one-hour time slot on Televisión Nacional de Chile (TVN) as La Hora de Hugo ("The Hour of Hugo"). Winners of the daily editions would meet in a weekend grand finale, and the journalist van called Hugomovil ('Hugomobile') traveled around Santiago to interview the program's participants. The show was initially hosted by Ivette Vergara until her pregnancy and then by Andrea Molina, with Sandro Larenas voicing Hugo and the opening theme song performed by Willy Sabor (Guillermo Andrés González Bravo). A similar format was used in the video game show program Sega Acción.

=== China ===
In the People's Republic of China, the Cantonese-language program 好欧天地 (Hǎo Ōu Tiāndì, "Hugo's World") premiered on Guangdong Television in 2004, airing every day in a 30-minute weekday version and a 60-minute weekend version. It featured a "little elf from a fairytale kingdom, whose name originates from the cheer 'Hao Ou!' (好噢) used by Chinese children," rescuing his family from the witch Sinra. It could not be broadcast live, and consequently also could not be played remotely, because at least a 30-second delay was required by the authorities to cut off the feed in case anyone said anything negative about the government.

=== Colombia ===
In Colombia, Hugo had his space between February 1999 and January 2001 as part of Franja Metro, the children's programming block of the Bogotá's local TV station Canal Capital. An animation of Hugo would talk with the hosts and the children who called the show to play the game.

=== Croatia ===
In Croatia, the Hugo show ran for eight years between 1996 and 2004 on the public Croatian Radiotelevision (HRT). Croatian Hugo was highly popular, in particular during the late 1990s at the time when it enjoyed an average viewership of 800,000. The program was presented by Boris Mirković, Ivana Plechinger and Kristijan Ugrina, with Hugo voiced by Ivo Rogulja and Scylla by Đurđa Ivezić. Its particularly iconic part was the taunt of Mordana (Scylla): Hajde, izaberi jedan broj, sigurno ćeš pogriješiti! ("Go on, choose a number, you will surely fail!").

=== Finland ===
The Finnish Hugo was introduced by game journalist-turned-producer Jussi-Pekka Kossila after he saw it in Denmark in 1992. Two different 30-minute Hugo shows were aired at the same time by Yle TV2, one for adults and one for children, achieving an 18% market share by 1996. The programs were originally presented by Taru Valkeapää (1993–94), who was chosen from among 45 candidates, and later by Marika Saukkonen, with Hugo voiced by Harri Hyttinen and Skylla (Scylla) by Meiju Suvas. Even after the game show had ended, Hugo's character would continue to appear as a host of an educational program. Finland's original Hugo merchandise included a music CD release DJ Hugo with dance hits of 1993.

=== France ===
The French version of the program was called Hugo Délire ("Hugo Frenzy"). Hugo Délire was hosted on France 3 by Karen Cheryl, with the actor Philippe Bruneau voicing Hugo, and was produced by Jacques Antoine's company Tilt Productions (later Adventure Lines Productions). It garnered an average of 25,000 participants per evening, the figure that might have climbed to 40,000 at the peak of its popularity when it was amassing up to 6 million simultaneous viewers. The show achieved cult status among French children of the 1990s.

=== German-speaking countries ===
In Germany, Austria, and Switzerland (the most significant program being in Germany), Die Hugo-Show, scored with techno music, would draw up to 200,000 phone calls every day at its peak, achieving a 40% viewer share in its target age of 3–13 with its audience of 700,000 in Germany and the number of callers sometimes exceeding 60,000 per show. It used a virtual reality-like studio and the "Hugomobile" van for live gameplay broadcasting all around the country in the Das Hugo-Mobil edition, becoming a cult show. The German version of Hugo won a Golden Cable award in 1995 for "Best Children's Program". Several celebrity musician guests occasionally appeared the show, including Masterboy. German presenters included Minh-Khai Phan-Thi, Yvette Dankou, Tania Schleef and Judith Hildebrandt. Sonja Zietlow hosted the spin-off program Hugo & Hexana. The German show run for the total of 861 episodes, at first hour-long, then half-hour, and eventually just 10-minute. Hugo's voice actor was originally Michael Habeck, followed by Oliver Grimm, Oliver Baier and Sven Blümel, while Karen Kernke voiced Hexana (German name for Scylla). In December 1996, Hugo-Show was replaced by the Kabel 1 program titled Hugo im Hexana-Schloss ("Hugo in Hexana's Castle"). The castle was a virtual studio that could represent different rooms where, instead of a team of presenters, the show was hosted only by the virtual troll (sometimes described in Germany as a kobold) Hugo and the live-action version of the evil witch Hexana, played by Julia Haacke. It was broadcast only on Saturday mornings in several episodes of ten minutes each between cartoon series. The spin-off Hexana was derived from this show, sponsored by PlayStation with the sub-title "Club PlayStation". There was a German Hugo magazine and a wide variety of merchandise, including numerous music CD releases.

=== Ireland ===
Ireland's Hiúdaí (the Irish name for Hugo) airing on TnaG won the Houses of the Oireachtas Channel awards "TV Presenter of the Year" in 2001 and "Personality of the Year" in 2004. Previously, Hiúdaí also surprised many when he won as the country's TV personality of the year in the Irish Film & Television Awards in 2000. The program was different than the Danish original and most other versions.

=== Israel ===
The Israeli Hugo (הוגו) began as a 30-minute show on the Arutz HaYeladim (Children's Channel) and quickly became the channel's most popular program. The show inspired a three-hour spin-off, Hugo's World (עולמו של הוגו), in 1996, in which children used a large step-on number pad to enter character movements. From 1997 to 2001, Hugo starred in a children's electricity safety campaign by Israel Electric Corporation and offered a contest related to this campaign in 1997. The program's presenters included Tal Berman. In addition to various local merchandise, it was adapted into a comic book miniseries and a children's musical stage show.

=== Poland ===
In Poland, the main show Hugo and a spin-off aired on Sundays (later Saturdays), while another spin-off aired Monday through Friday. All of these programs were shown on the Polsat network, being filmed at first in the Informacje (a predecessor of Wydarzenia) news program's weather room before being moved to a blue box studio. The content was originally modeled after the German version of the show, and later developed in cooperation with the company Cenega publishing the localized Hugo video games in Poland. The main program spawned two spin-offs: Hugo Family (running from 2002 to 2006) where entire families competed in the show featuring puzzles rather than action sequences and without the final endgames, and Hugo Express (launched in 2003) airing on workdays without hosts and endgames. Hugo was the most popular children's program in Poland for several years, with the country's "Hugomania" lasting between 2002 and 2006. During this period, an episode was watched by between two-and-half and three million Polish viewers at the peak of the show's popularity. Hugo was originally hosted by Wojciech Asiński and Andrzej Krucz, later (2005 to 2009) replaced by Piotr Galus, while Aleksandra Woźniak hosted Hugo Family. The character of Hugo was originally voiced by Andrzej Niemirski and later by Mariusz Czajka. According to Niemirski, a single episode might have been watched in 2.5 million households. Similar to as in Germany, there was a long-running monthly (later bi-monthly) children's magazine with a coloring-book spin-off magazine, in addition to various kinds of locally produced merchandise such as food products. It ranked as the fourth best-remembered classic Polsat program in the network's 30th anniversary poll in 2022.

=== Portugal ===
In Portugal, the Hugo show's presenters included Alexandra Cruz, Fernando Martins, Pedro Mendonça, Pedro Pinto, Joana Seixas and Susana Bento Ramos, and the voice actors included Frederico Trancoso (Hugo), Graça Ferreira (Hugolina), and Mónica Garcez (Maldiva/Scylla). Hugo won a Troféu Nova Gente award in 1999. The show was ended by Emilío Rangel as soon as he became the RTP1 director, but was later revived on RTP2 as the daily programs Hora H - Hugo e os amigos (H Hour - Hugo and His Friends) in 2000 and Hugo, o Regresso (Hugo, the Return) in 2001.

=== Russia ===
Позвоните Кузе ("Call Kuzya") was the first interactive program in the history of Russian television, hosted on RTR-2 by Inna Gomes and Andrei Fedorov. Hugo was renamed to Kuzya (Кузя), possibly after Kuzya the Domovoy (Домовёнок Кузя), the hero of a classic Soviet cartoon series. He was voiced by Aleksander Lenkov and Dmitry Polonsky, while Scylla was voiced by Aleksandra Ravenskih.

=== Slovenia ===
The Slovenian Hugo show was hosted by Gregor Krajc (who later went to become the State Secretary of the Republic of Slovenia) on TV Slovenija. It became the country's #1 entertainment show by 1996, reaching 38% viewer share among its target demographic.

=== Spain ===
In Spain, a quarter of the TV watchers tuned in to watch Hugo as part of the program Telecupón on Telecinco, a viewing figure that would remain unsurpassed since 1994. It was hosted by Carmen Sevilla and Hugo was changed from a troll to a duende. The success of the show, launched in June 1992 as the first non-Danish Hugo program, prompted the addition of the standalone show Hugolandia that began airing three months later. Directed by Sebastian Junyent, it was presented by Beatriz Rico, Luis Alberto Vazquez, and Roma and Eva Morales. "Pepe Carabias" (José Carabias Lorenzo) voiced Hugo in Spain.

=== Sweden ===
Trollet Hugo (Hugo the Troll) was greatly successful among Swedish children during the 1990s. The TV4 version of the show became the country's best-rated children's show of 1996. The voice cast included Staffan Thomée as Hugo, Annika Sundberg as Hugolina, and Katarina Ewerlöf as Skylla.

=== Turkey ===
Hugo became Turkey's highest ranking children's show and achieved a 12% share of the total market at the time when the country was new to private TV channels. The program was enormously popular, especially at the beginning in 1993 when it was being watched by millions of children, thousands of whom would compete to play as callers. The show was primarily hosted by Tolga Abi (Tolga Gariboğlu) for over a decade. There was also a Hugo-themed theatrical show and a collection of locally made merchandise. In the Turkish version, Scylla (cadı Sila, was voiced by Eylem Şenkal) kidnapped Hugo's family to fulfill her desire to gain eternal beauty by drinking their sweat obtained from being worked to death, a motif not mentioned in the other versions. An often repeated urban legend tells of a boy shouting obscenities at both Hugo and the show's host Tolga upon losing in his game before being cut off, with many claiming having witnessed this aired on live television, although such incident has been denied by Tolga himself and there is no record of it.

=== United Kingdom ===
In the UK, Hugo was played on What's Up Doc? and The Shiny Show, reaching up to 38% viewer share on the latter. The former's version had Scylla with a green color skin.

=== United States ===
Hugo was known as Tino in a successful 6-minute long program running on the Spanish-language network Telemundo, airing from 1993 to 1995. It was hosted by Jessica Fox while Hugo was a duende instead of a troll. Hugo's voice was provided by Wally Wingert.

=== Vietnam ===
In Vietnam, the show was first aired in 2004 with the title Vui cùng Hugo ("Fun with Hugo") on Ho Chi Minh City Radio and Television. It was hosted by Ngoc Linh and Thanh Thao, with Hugo voiced by Quach Ho Ninh. Since December 2005, a Northern version of the show has been aired on Hanoi Radio Television along with the HTV version. It was called Hugo và các bạn ("Hugo and friends") and was hosted by Hoàng Thùy Linh, Lê Đức Anh (Đức Anh Hugo), Nguyen Thanh Vân (Thanh Vân Hugo) and Thu Hằng. The show became one of the highest rated shows in Vietnam by 2008, receiving an average of 20,000 phone calls per episode and up to 500,000 weekly at the peak. The program became a household name and a favorite among both children and adults. Hugo và các bạn was axed in 2008 as a part of Hanoi TV's mass gameshow cancellation, with almost every such program made by the station being discontinued and replaced with HTV gameshows and a movie block.

== Other media and merchandise ==
Various video games, including a series directly adapted from the 1990s show, and other media and licensed merchandise have been produced in Denmark to be distributed around the world. There have been also two attempts to adapt the show into an animated film, among various other developments. By the 2018 estimate of Hugo creator Ivan Sølvason, there have been a total of some 6,500 different Hugo products worldwide.

The Danish demoscene group Budbrain, consisting of programmer Kim Frederiksen ("Psycho") and graphics artist and composer René Bidstrup ("Diablo"), released Budbrain Megademo II on 26 December 1990. The demo features a storyline in which Nikki Finn from Who's That Girl (here referred to as her actress, "Madonna") is stabbed to death in a parody of Psycho, and the killer, revealed to be Hugo, is sentenced to death by hanging while the theme song from Twin Peaks plays. This was due to Budbrain's rivalry with Crionics, another demoscene group who mocked them out of annoyance that their Megademo (2) (also featuring Nikki and crediting a graphics artist named "Madonna Freak") came in second place in the Amiga Conference 1990 after the former's Budbrain Megademo, and Frederiksen and Bidstrup becoming fed up with Hugo and feeling jealous that they were not working for ITE at the time. According to Frederiksen, he and Bidstrup decided to "take the piss" but at the same time utilize Hugo's hanging as a way to show off their work. Bidstrup drew Hugo from scratch himself instead of stealing graphics from the game show. Because of this, the two of them got to work for ITE, working on the MS-DOS version of the video game as programmer and graphics artist, respectively.

Until the channel's closure on 31 May 1998, Hugo made regular appearances on Nickelodeon Germany as part of "Nick Live Club". The character was an integral part of the show and would interact with the human in-vision presenters.

== Influence ==
The worldwide success of Hugo inspired several other similar television game show programs during the 1990s. These included Games World (UK/Germany 1993-1998), Pizza Rollo (France 1994-1995), Joe Razz (Sweden 1994), Game Over (Finland 1994-1997), Galilei the Dog (Finland 1996-1997), Maxihra (Slovakia 1997-2000), and ITE's own Throut and Neck (Denmark/Brazil 1997-1999).
