= Weekend-TV =

Weekend-TV was an attempt in the mid-1980s to break the Danish television monopoly held by DR. It was broadcast using a terrestrial frequency on weekends in Copenhagen. Financed primarily by Nordisk Film, the experience ended after one year. Journalist Ole Stephensen was its editor-in-chief.

== History ==
The channel originated from Kanal 2's struggle against the DR monopoly. It began on 24 November 1984 concurrently with an eighteen-month pilot project exploring the creation of 28 local television stations. At the same time, Danish media heavyweights Politikens Hus, Det Berlingske Hus, Børsen, Aller, Egmont and Nordisk Film, announced its bid for a television channel. Unlike Kanal 2, which relied on subscriptions and decoders, Weekend-TV was free-to-air; much like the later TV 2 until 2009. Its initial plan was to broadcast a free service before eventually moving to a subscription model. The aim of the free channel was to create momentum for it to become a national channel.

One month before broadcasts began, coinciding with the launch of Kanal 2 on cable, Weekend-TV's backers published a full-page newspaper advertisement saying "From 23 December, Danmarks Radio will have a little brother", above a cut-out illustration of the lower body of a baby wearing shoes with the DR logo. The advertisement said that its coverage (on UHF channels 53 and 56) would reach a potential 1.3 million viewers, while announcing its first broadcasts on 23 December, followed by Christmas Day and Boxing Day (taking a break on Christmas Eve). It was expected to operate a three-day schedule (Fridays to Sundays) in 1985, as well as national holidays. Its biggest provocation against the monopoly was the hiring of TV Avisen presenter Mette Fugl, which was reported by the media as "Mette Guldfugl", an ostensible kidnapping (she was actually hired) for the commercial channel. Not all of her colleagues at DR saw her move as positive. Fugl considered it an act of "treason" (working at a commercial TV station challenging DR's monopoly) but was tired of DR. There, she presented Weekend-Gæsten, a political interview programme, where she picked the interviewee.

The journalists working at Weekend-TV had to create their own programmes to fill a regular three-day schedule. Tom Pedersen made several magazine programmes that were impossible to be produced by DR, including one on luxury cars. A police programme featured a policewoman in uniform reading information on missing persons. The formats were inspired by existing formats in Sweden and the UK.

=== Effort to become TV 2 ===
In 1985, the Weekend-TV staff headed over to the Christenborg Palace to petition for their plan to become TV 2. One action was sending promotional material saying "There's an independent Danish TV 2 in Mosedalvej, Valby". This included photos of its staff (over 60 members), most of which had experience in the newspaper industry. The biggest problem was its lack of an audience. In June-July 1985, staff convened in an emergency meeting whose key conclusion was to aim to become a highlight in Danish media, leading to a permanent license. The plan was rejected, and its programming was limited to a basic Friday night variety show, Så er det fredag (comparable to the later Eleva2ren). The press groups left in November 1985, leaving the channel to Egmont and Nordisk Film. Mette Fugl voluntarily left. The Danish parliament approved a new law for the establishment of TV 2 without Weekend-TV's staff.

TV 2 eventually started broadcasting on 1 October 1988.
