= Hugo (franchise) =

Danish media franchise

- Created by: Ivan Sølvason; Niels Krogh Mortensen
- Original work: Hugo (game show)

Print publications
- Books: Hugo i de Afskyelige Labyrinter; Hugo: Troll Story (Poland); Cadı Sila'ya Karşı (Turkey)
- Comics: Hugo (Israel)
- Magazines: Hugo; Hugo Haftalık Çizgi Dergisi (Turkey); A jugar con Hugo (Argentina); Świat Przygód z Hugo (Poland)

Films and television
- Films: Hugo and the Diamond Moon (cancelled); Hugo – The World's Worst Comeback (cancelled)
- Direct-to-video: Hugo Safari (2003)

Theatrical presentations
- Musical: The Magical Kingdom of Hugo

Games
- Traditional: Board games
- Video games: Hugo series; Other games

Audio
- Original music: "Hugo Rap!", "Hugo Er En Skærmtrold" (Denmark); Various (Germany)

Miscellaneous
- Toys: Figures, plushies

Hugo (Danish: Skærmtrolden Hugo, lit. 'Hugo the Screen-Troll' (Note: Skærmtrold is a play on charmetrold (transl. charm-troll), a word for a sweet and charming person or creature.)) is a media franchise created by the Danish company Interactive Television Entertainment (later ITE Media) in 1990 for the purpose of interactive television for children. It is based around the fictional character of Hugo, a friendly, small Scandinavian folklore troll engaged in a conflict against a wicked witch, often to save his family. Since its premiere in 1990, the Hugo game show has been aired in more than 40 countries, spawning dozens of video games for various platforms. Hugo spawned other merchandise, including dedicated magazines. As of 2012, the commercial parts of the franchise consist mostly of mobile games being published by the Danish company Hugo Games (renamed 5th Planet Games in 2018).

== Setting and characters ==
Hugo (on the coin in the center) and the other classic main characters (clockwise: Hugo's wife Hugolina, their children Rut, Rit, and Rat, and the villains Don Croco and Scylla).

The show is set in a cartoonish contemporary fantasy universe. The franchise's titular protagonist, Hugo, is a one-meter-tall troll living in the "Troll Forest", located somewhere in Scandinavia. Hugo's family includes his beloved wife Hugolina (Hugoline in the original Danish version) and their three children, Rit (TrolleRit), Rat (TrolleRat), and Rut (TrolleRut). Their main antagonist is the evil Scylla (Afskylia, named differently in some localized versions, such as Hexana in German), an ancient and cruel witch with a grudge against the trolls dating back centuries and Hugo always standing in her way. Scylla often kidnaps Hugo's family because she needs their presence to restore and keep her own youth and beauty due to a curse. She uses her magic and minions, as well as various traps, to stop Hugo from rescuing his family or foil her other plots. The later-added characters are mostly non-human creatures and anthropomorphic animals, including Hugo's friends (such as Fernando the toucan and Jean Paul the chimpanzee in Jungle Island) and more of Hugo's enemies (notably Scylla's faithful but dumb henchman Don Croco, leading a humanoid crocodile army on Jungle Island to protect his mistress and help her oppress the Kikurians, a primitive tribe of the island's native creatures). All of this is presented in a humorous way, by default tailored to children aged 4–14. According to Hugo creator Ivan Sølvason, the program's intended message was to teach children to protect their own families at any cost, including risking their lives to save them if needed.

Some later video games and other adaptations dropped the usual Hugolina-kidnapping motif, making Scylla beautiful by default yet still as hateful as ever. In their stories, the witch would variably seek revenge against Hugo personally or even try to get rid of the trolls everywhere once and for all, cause other mischief such as attacking Hugo's old friend Santa Claus in the Christmas games, or search for an ultimate power to take over the world, and several even dropped her as a character altogether. In 2001, a beaver minor enemy character received its own spin-off show, titled Stinky & Stomper. In the 2005 science fiction reboot titled Agent Hugo, Hugo became a futuristic James Bond-parody special agent as an employee of the crime-fighting spy organization R.I.S.K. to fight against high-tech enemies such as mad scientists and robots.

== History ==
The idea for an interactive game TV show was conceived in 1987 by Ivan Sølvason, founder of the initially small video game studio SilverRock Productions and former editor-in-chief of Oberoende Computer, who was the creator of the computer video game OsWALD (1988) that came out in Nordisk Film's TV2 Denmark in 1989, and Niels Krogh Mortensen, an animator. Sølvason's small company SilverRock Productions, which was later renamed Interactive Television Entertainment (ITE) ApS in 1992, developed the character of Hugo as well as the designated, custom-built computer hardware system that would convert telephone DTMF signals into remotely controlling the characters in the game and allow the interaction of the audience and the TV action without delay. Sølvason and Krogh Mortensen created the concept of "Hugo the TV troll", and the first Hugo TV program was launched in September 1990. Since the show's second season, the player's objective has usually been to help Hugo free his wife and children from Scylla's captivity. Hugo had to journey through one of the different game environments before he got to one of Scylla's lairs, avoiding various traps and other dangers while collecting gold along the way. Once the player finished the game, he or she would receive a prize reward according to the obtained game score, which was based on the player's performance in the main scenario but greatly depended on how well Hugo fared in his final and purely luck-based task to rescue his family, with a special bonus for capturing Scylla.

Hugo was invented by Krogh Mortensen while he was biking to his grandmother from Hellerup to Gladsaxe in the spring of 1990. The character Hugo was originally supposed to be called Max, but the producer of Eleva2ren, John Berger, insisted on the name Hugo, forcing ITE to change the name and logo about one week before the premiere. The new name caused trademark problems because it was already registered in most European countries by Hugo Boss, while ITE A/S was first in Denmark and Portugal and could potentially stop Hugo Boss from launching any products in these markets. Eventually, both companies reached a coexistence agreement with the help of ITE in-house lawyer Nina Wium. ITE also fought hard against any attempt to abuse Hugo's "good name and reputation", resulting in more than 170 lawsuits against Danish producers and advertisers.

The programs were licensed for more than 40 (43 as of 2007) TV shows around the world, tailored to individual markets. Many of the more than half a billion viewers believed that the program was native to their countries, as Hugo spoke Danish only in Denmark. By 1994, Sweden's Datormagazin compared the European popularity of Hugo, with its branching off into merchandising, to that of the Ninja Turtles. On German-language kabel eins, there was also a spin-off show titled Hexana-Schloss ("Hexana's [Scylla's] Castle"). A more advanced show, Hugo: Jungle Island (Hugo Vulkanøen), premiered in January 1999. Some Danish Hugo items were released exclusively for the fan club Den Faktyrlige Bogklub (Hugo's Book Club), which was established in cooperation with the Danish publisher Carlsen Verlag in 1999. A "giant" Hugo theme park has also been considered at one point, circa 2000.

At first, Niels Krogh Mortensen was doing all of the graphics and animation using Deluxe Paint on an Amiga computer. His brother, Lars Krogh Mortensen, later assisted him. They were later joined by Torben B. Larsen, Jonas Fromm, Claus Friese, Anders Morgenthaler, Jakob Steffensen, Jonas Raagaard, Stephen Meldal Foged, Martin Ciborowski, Ulla Gram Larsen, and many other 2D and 3D artists; eventually, over 100 people were working on developing Hugo for ITE. Niels Krogh Mortensen worked on Hugo between 1990 and 1998. During this time, he usually directed and managed the projects; he also created storyboards and drew graphics. The Krogh Mortensen brothers and Jakob Steffensen left ITE in 1997 and founded their own company, Krogh Mortensen Animation A/S (KMA), who was later contracted to animate several more Hugo games.

In 2002, Sølvason sold ITE to the venture capital company Olicom A/S; Olicom then invested $22 million in the company, reduced the staff of ITE by a third to 60 employees, and attempted to expand more into the US, UK, and Asian markets. Olicom in turn sold ITE in 2006, by then staffed by only 35 employees, to NDS Group, where it became NDS Denmark.

Hugo copyrights were acquired by the Danish game publisher Krea Medie A/S, a part of the media company Kraemedie. New owner Henrik Kølle revealed in October 2012 that several new projects for Hugo franchise were in plans, including a film project. Later in November, Krea Medie was acquired by Egmont Group, but Hugo Games and the rights to Hugo were not part of the sale agreement with Egmont. A possible new Hugo live show was hinted at in July 2014. Hugo Games is owned and managed by Henry Mallet and was valued at DKK 56 million, generating an annual income of about DKK 10 million, as estimated in September 2014 when the company was listed for investment as HUGO NewHold ApS.

== Video game adaptations ==
=== ITE games ===
Niels Krogh Mortensen and his brother Lars directed more than 30 Hugo games that sold more than 10 million copies, including over three million in Germany alone. The games were released for multiple platforms, including personal computers, game consoles, and mobile phones. Most of the titles are platform games or minigame compilations, but there are also several educational games. In the early games, Hugo attempts to free his family from the witch Scylla in familiar scenarios that are the same as in the TV show. In the later games, Hugo thwarts Scylla's more elaborate revenge plots against the trolls and schemes to gain a supreme magic power, and several games do not feature her at all. In some of the games, Hugo's family members (usually also to foil Scylla's), his friends, or sometimes even their enemies (in the multiplayer games) are featured as playable characters in addition to or instead of Hugo. Unlike the ones based directly on the TV show, limited to the established settings, the other entries in the Hugo game series have Hugo's family members visit a variety of different fantasy and real-world locations.

The first title in the long-running series of Hugo games was created in 1991 for the Commodore 64, followed by games for the Amiga, MS-DOS, Windows, Game Boy, and PlayStation. There have also been numerous small browser games, the first of which was released in 1996. The first 3D platform game, Hugo: Quest for the Sunstones, was published in 2000. Beginning in 2005, Hugo was rebooted as Agent Hugo, with a new series of four 3D action games. Distributors and partners included Egmont Interactive, Electronic Arts, and Namco. In Turkey, several games were published by the newspaper Hürriyet.

=== Later games ===
In 2009, the new publisher, Krea Medie, released a complete reboot game, Hugo: Magic in the Troll Woods (Hugo – Magi i Troldeskoven), with no connection to any of the Hugo show characters or the Agent Hugo series, featuring Hugo as a troll magician-in-training. It became the only game listed on the games' official website, and all the previous content was entirely removed.

In 2010, however, Krea released a game-making program that featured an original version of Hugo and other classic characters. In 2011, the company's new owner, Henrik Kølle, said he hoped that the release of a new video game would enable Hugo franchise to become a global brand. Krea has abandoned an idea of the reboot (which got removed from the official website) and returned to the original version of the franchise with Hugo Retro Mania, featuring the original version of Hugo and a classic scenario of rescuing his family captured by Scylla the witch (renamed "Sculla" in the English version). According to Henrik Kølle, Krea Medie began to develop the projects tailored to Hugo after its acquisition. The task of developing new games was given to the specially created studio, Hugo Games A/S. A 2015 game, Ronaldo & Hugo: Superstar Skaters, guest-starred top footballer Cristiano Ronaldo. Hugo Games later acquired the developer Fuzzy-Frog Games in 2017 and renamed itself 5th Planet Games, concentrating on creating online slot games based on Hugo characters and classic scenarios for several years.

== Feature film adaptation projects ==
=== Hugo and the Diamond Moon ===
A canceled CGI-animated film titled Hugo and the Diamond Moon was planned in 1999 and to be released at the end of 2002. Its budget was set at around 100 million DKK, which at that time amounted to $10 million. It was written and expected to be directed by Disney and Pixar veteran animator and musician Jørgen Klubien and storyboarded with over 8,000 sketches by Frank Madsen, Jørgen Klubien, Mike Cachuela, and Mads Themberg. David Filskov, who did sound effects for Hugo for years, was on the film project as well. According to ITE's CEO, Jesper Helbrandt, they wanted to make a Hugo animated film for years. It was planned that the release of the film would be accompanied by a range of tie-in products, including a soundtrack, toys, and video games.

In the film, Hugo and his grandfather were supposed to "travel to a diamond moon", and the storyboards showed Hugo battling Scylla in space. The film's basic plot premise resembled the educational game Hugo in Space, which was released in 2003, one year after the planned release of the film. In this game, Scylla plans to extract the rare magical black diamonds (first introduced in the action game Hugo: Black Diamond Fever in 2002) from an asteroid's core and become the most powerful witch of all time, and so Hugo and his kids follow Scylla across the Solar System to foil her before it is too late.

=== Hugo – The World's Worst Comeback ===
Another CGI film by Einstein Film (Ronal the Barbarian) and Anima Vitae (The Flight Before Christmas, Little Brother, Big Trouble: A Christmas Adventure) was officially announced when its teaser trailer was published in February 2013. It was to be produced by Petteri Pasanen and Trine Heidegaard, directed by Philip Einstein Lipski and Mikko Pitkänen, and written by Tim John and Timo Turunen. Finnish film foundation SES gave 50,000 euros for the project. It was also given development support from Creative Europe. The film was to start production in 2014 for a planned release in 2016, but was later quietly canceled.

Its plot premise would have followed a former TV-game show star Hugo, who is a hotel janitor and a single father. His daughter, aware of his former celebrity fame and feeling herself to be abandoned, decides to bring her father home by creating Hugo's new show. Meanwhile, Hugo's old enemy, the mountain troll Fredo, steals Hugo's place in the show. Hugo's daughter ends up fighting Fredo, disguised as her father on live TV, while Hugo decides to get rid of fame and save own daughter. Scylla was also said to have a part in the film.

== Theatrical and television spin-offs ==
=== Theatrical shows ===
In 1996, a theatrical musical called The Magical Kingdom of Hugo (הממלכה הקסומה של הוגו) was played in Tel Aviv, Israel, telling the story of a group of children who were sucked into the television screen and summoned directly to Hugo's world, Trollandia, by the witch Griselda (גריזלדה, an Israeli name for Scylla). A recording of it was also commercially released on VHS in 1997, and a CD with the songs from the musical was released too.

A Turkish interactive stage show adaptation for children ages 3–6 titled Hugo ve Tolga Abi Cadı Sila'ya Karşı ("Hugo and Tolga Against the Witch Scylla") was played in Istanbul in 2004–2005, directed by Recep Özgür Dereli. In it, Scylla (Sila), played by Eda Özdemir, and Don Croco (Donkroko) make a new trap for Hugo and his family.

=== Hugo Safari ===
A children's animated documentary series, Hugo Safari, was produced in 1999–2000, directed by Elsa Søby. It consists of three seasons, each of which contains seven episodes. The series aired in several countries and was also released in home media by ITE on the DVD. Krae later released some of the episodes for free on the Internet and others for purchase as an iPhone/iPad application.

== Other media ==
=== Magazines ===
The characters of Hugo were also a subject of several dedicated periodical magazines, including Hugo Magazin / Hugo News in Germany (1999–2003), A jugar con Hugo in Argentina (1995–2006), Haftalık Hugo and Hugo Çocuk Dergisi in Turkey (written by Oktay Nezih Can, and drawn by Oğuzhan Kayan and Akın Çavdarlı), and Świat Przygód z Hugo in Poland (2003–2010), along with its coloring book offshoot magazine Baw Się i Koloruj z Hugo.

=== Music ===
Four Danish original music albums (mostly dance and hip hop) have been released between 1990 and 1991: Hugo Rap!, Hugo Er En Skærmtrold, Ta Det Bare Roligt, and Trolde Rock, followed by Det`Så Skønt at være Dansker! in 1994. A charity album by various artists, DJ Hugo, was released in Finland in 1993; it included tracks by Ace of Base ("Young and Proud"), DJ BoBo ("Keep on Dancing!"), and Double You ("Who's Fooling Who").

Numerous original and licensed music album compilations by various artists saw release in Germany during the mid-1990s. These included Hugo Rap: Der Song Zur Interaktiven Gameshow (pop rap, 1994) and Hoppla Hugo (euro house, 1995); Hugo & The Witch – I Know It's Heaven (house, progressive trance, garage house, 1995); Hugo feat. Judith: Show me the Way (euro house, 1996); Hugo's Mega Dance (techno, euro house, euro pop, 1994), Hugo's Mega Dance 2 (techno, euro house, happy hardcore, hip hop, 1995), Hugo's Mega Dance '96 (techno, house, euro pop, 1996), Hugo's Mega Dance '96 – Frühlings-Hits (techno, euro house, happy hardcore, hip hop, 1996), Hugo's Mega Dance '96 – Die Dritte (techno, euro house, happy hardcore, hip hop, 1996), Hugo's Mega Dance '97 (techno, euro house, hip hop, synth-pop, 1997), and Hugo's Mega Dance '97 – Frühlings-Hits.

In Poland, the original music album Hugo i Przyjaciele Śpiewają Piosenki was released in 2002. To promote Hugo video games, their Polish distributor, Cenega Poland, organized Hugo holiday concerts together with Bartek Wrona of the boyband Just 5.

=== Books and audiobooks ===
Hugo books have included Danish sticker books and activity books, the latter including the picture book Hugo i de afskyelige labyrinter (an adaptation of the original game) and the puzzle book Hugo i de fantastiske labyrinter (a loose adaptation of the video game Hugo: Cannon Cruise). Books in other countries have included the Israeli comics series Hugo by Koren Shadmi, the Polish activity book series Księga Labiryntów Hugo, and the Polish series of children's booklets Troll Story. There is also a Turkish audio story book (an audio book cassette released with an emulated children's book) called Hugo: Cadı Sila'ya Karşı and a Danish Christmas story audio book called Hugo og det Fortryllede Agern ("Hugo and the Enchanted Acorn").

== Assorted merchandise ==
In Denmark, the native country of the Hugo franchise, the ITE-licensed merchandise items included food products (such as ice cream and candy), as well as various other merchandise, including two board games (based on the first and second seasons of the show), figurines, puzzles, watches, and backpacks. The Hugo brand was highly popular in the country, for example, selling out over 35,000 bath towels in a couple of weeks, while the Swedish sweets factory Cloetta managed to increase its share of the Danish market from 4 to 35% during the 18 months of its Hugo license campaign. There was also a Hugo-themed casino slot machine based on the gold mine scenario.

Hugo merchandising in other countries included a music cassette and sticker albums in Chile, the board game Hugo in Sweden, and so forth. In Germany, it included clothing items (T-shirts, sweatshirts, hoodies, and socks), plush dolls (of Hugo and his family), PVC figures (of Hugo, his family, Fernando, and Scylla), and posters. In Israel, it included the browser app Tamahugo, student kits, and toys. In Poland, it included various food products (such as chocolate bars by Danone, potato chips by Lorenz Snack-World, and a line of juice drinks by SokPol) and various CD-ROMs (audio, graphics, and minigames). In Slovenia, it included vitamin drinks, tea, T-shirts, pins, candy, and puzzles.

In the first Krea Medie/Hugo Games merchandise, Adimex released a line of Hugo Troll Race-themed bath products in 2013. That same year, Hugo Games negotiated a new partnership with the Nordic games company Tactic for a full line of products, including coloring books, activity books, sticker books, and puzzles for Denmark, Finland, Iceland, Norway, and Sweden, to come out in 2013 and 2014. The line is based on classic Hugo artwork. Also in 2014, Hugo-themed biscuits were released by Danish company Karen Volf, based on the new games, and YOUNiik launched a shop with Hugo cover and case designs. The first Hugo-themed slot game was released in 2016, followed by several more over the next few years.

== Reception ==
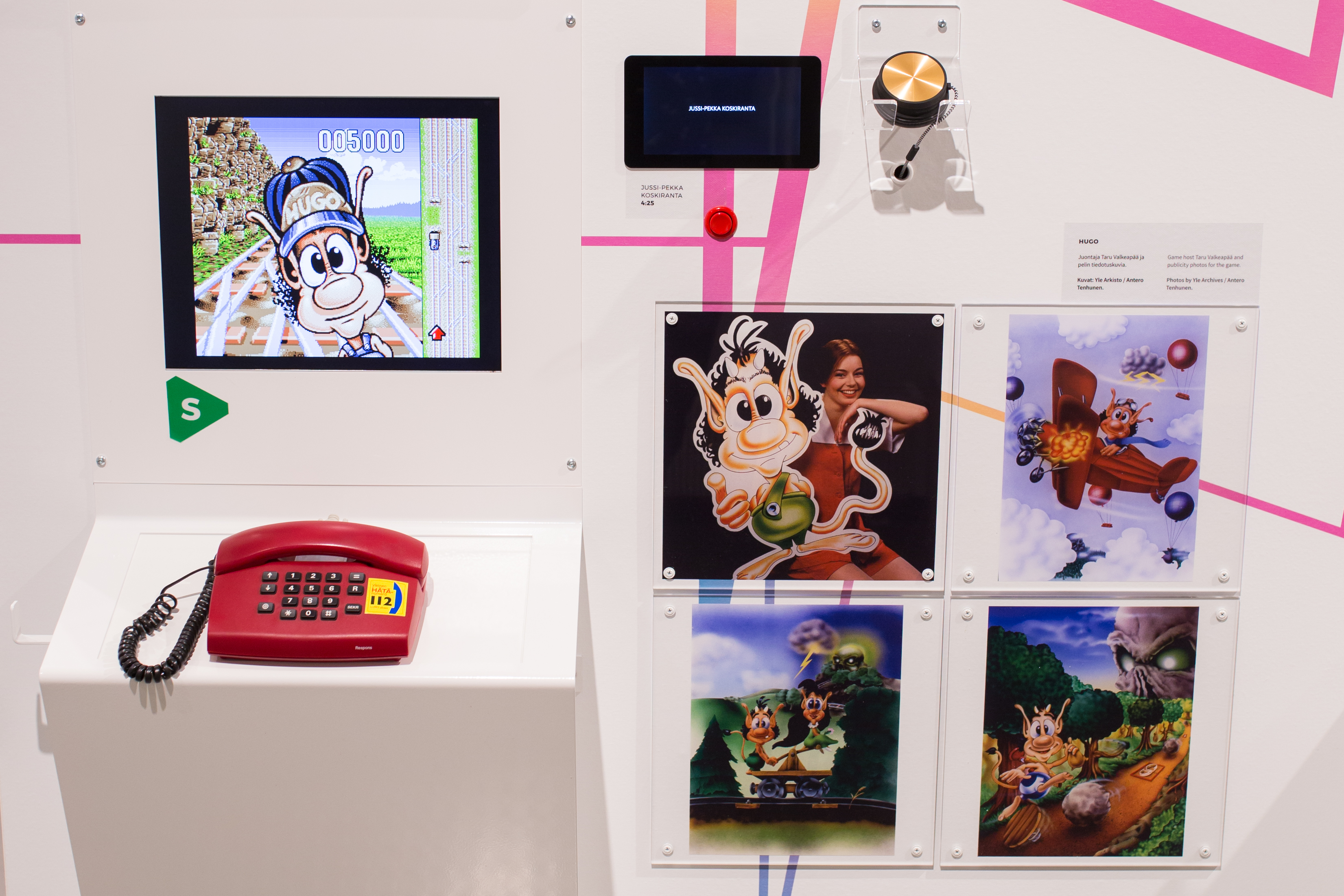
Hugo TV show and game adaptation exhibit at the Finnish Museum of Games

The program won awards for a best entertainment show in eight countries, including the Golden Cable award for the best children's program in 1995 in Germany, a title for the best-rated children's show of all time in 1996 in Sweden, a 1999 Troféu Nova Gente award in Portugal, the TV Presenter of the Year award in 2001 and the Oireachtas TV Personality of the Year in 2004 in Ireland, and Argentina's Martín Fierro Awards' Best Kids Show of 2003. Hugo game sales exceeded 6 million copies by 2001 and 8.5 million copies by 2005. In 2012, mobile game Hugo Troll Race became the fastest selling Danish game on the App Store, with more than 1 million downloads worldwide in just three days.

=== Cultural impact ===
In 2001, a 20-meter-high effigy of Afskylia (Scylla) entered the Guinness Book of Records as the biggest witch dummy ever burned at Sankt Hans (the Danish Midsummer festival). In 2009, the Hugo franchise was selected to be a central part of the country's digital heritage exhibit at the Royal Danish Library. Vietnam Idol contestant Đức Anh Hugo (born Lê Đức Anh) changed his name after Hugo, as did the Vietnamese presenter, actress, singer, and businesswoman Thanh Vân Hugo (born Thanh Vân), while the singer Uyên Linh's nickname Simla came from the Vietnamese name of Scylla. In 2019, Balkan police forces and Europol launched anti-migrant Operation Hugo/River/Mordana (Mordana was Scylla's name in the region).
