= Tal Berman =

Israeli TV host and Radio broadcaster

Tal Berman טל ברמן
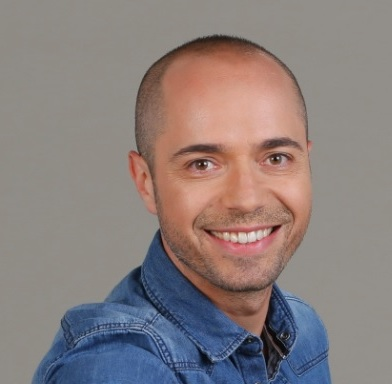
- Born: December 11, 1973 (age 51); Tel Aviv, Israel
- Occupations: TV host, Radio broadcaster
- Spouse: Amy Friedman

Tal Berman (Hebrew: טל ברמן; born December 11, 1973) is an Israeli TV host and Radio broadcaster.

== Biography ==
As a child, Berman lived in Kiryat Ono, where he also studied. He did his service in the IDF on Galy IDF as a broadcaster and as a host of several personal programs ("Check 5", "The heat has been canceled" and "Doubtful"). Leberman bachelor's degree in political science.

Upon his release from the army in 1995, he began hosting the entertainment "Hugo" on the Children's Channel. 1997 began presenting the nightly talk show on Channel 2 "Perfar Lila", in which Ran Telam and Roi Levy.

In 2000, he hosted "Stanga" - a sports program on Channel 2, for a year. In 2001, he presented the program "Sha'arim without a break" on nonstop radio with the commentator Slomo Sharaf by his side. The program was broadcast for a whole year, and it was the first time that the football games were not broadcast by the Voice of Israel.

From 2002, Berman hosted "The Morning with Tal and Aviad" together with Aviad Kisos. The program was broadcast on Radio Tel Aviv for seven and a half years, and from January 2010 it was broadcast on Echo 99 FM and at the same time on Radio Kol Ekad until the end of the program in May 2023, after about 21 years.

In 2002, with the start of Channel 10 broadcasts, he began to present the program "Hadhoo", from which he retired after a few weeks. The following year, he began hosting "News of Science" on Channel 8 for five seasons. From 2004 he hosted the talk show "Hazha" of Beep Channel on HOTs in its first two seasons.

In 2006 he presented "After all", a nightly magazine that dealt with the events of the day from a lighter angle and was broadcast on the Channel 2 franchise resht and in 2007 discount Together with Shalom Assig the program "Talent or Failure" on Channel 2.

In 2008 he hosted a documentary series on Arutz I1 on the occasion of the 60th anniversary celebrations of the State, called "Custodians of the State". In the same year he made a personal documentary film called "My Baldness", which dealt with baldness male. From 2008 to 2013 he served as content development manager at Herzliya Studios, where he was among the developers of the entertainment show "The Golden Cage" and other programs.

In 2009 he presented the cultural program "Bad Culture" on the yes stars Israeli channel alongside alternating panelists. In 2010 he hosted on Channel 1 with Scout Grant the program "The Dream Team" that accompanied the World Cup 2010.

In 2011, Berman hosted the program "Wypout" on Channel 10 alongside Aviad Kisos, as well as the reality program "next generation 24/7". In 2012 the two hosted the show "The Wedding Game" on Channel 10.

In June 2012, he started presenting on Channel 1 a talk show called "Fridays with Tal Berman", which aired for one season on Friday evenings.

Between the years 2013–2017, he presented a studio program called "Open Field" alongside Talia Salant on Hasport Channel.

From September 3, 2017 until the Reshet-Esar merger in January 2019 Berman presented the program "The Tube" on Channel Ten as a replacement for Guy Lerr. After the merger, he began to present the program "Hayom Heya" to sum up today's news, in the place of Gai Zohar.

In November 2022 we were sent on behalf of Kan 11 to Qatar in order to guide the World Cup 2022 studio in the channel's broadcasts.

In March 2023, he started submitting together with Sharon Davidovitch, the podcast "No Powers" in which they talk about sports from a different angle, intended for sports lovers, But also for the layman, which has various corners, such as the "Dictionary", which explains in depth the basic concepts in sports, as well as classic stories from the world of sports.

In May 2023, after the end of "Tal and Aviad", Barman stayed at Eco99FM and started presenting a new morning show alongside Tam Aharon and Avia Farhi. In 2024 he submitted from Berlin the Euro 2024 studio here 11.

== Personal life ==
In February 2004 Berman married Amy Friedman, a clinical psychologist. The couple has four children.
