= Eleva2ren =

- Theme music composer: Klaus Kjerellup
- Country of origin: Denmark

Original release
- Network: TV 2
- Release: 7 October 1988 – 17 May 1996

Eleva2ren (pun on elevatoren with to (2), in reference to TV 2) was a Danish live entertainment programme broadcast on TV 2 from 7 October 1988 to 17 May 1996.

Produced by Nordisk Film's TV production unit, it aired on Friday nights and mixed entertainment, music and reports. Guests arrived in by an elevator – hence the name.

A regular item on the show was the usage of interactive video games which were controlled using the viewer's telephone, the first of which was OsWALD, followed later on by the much more successful Hugo, which first appeared here before being exported around the world.

== History ==
The programme originated in 1985 as Så 'der fredag!, a variety show produced by Nordisk Film for Weekend-TV, a television channel that occupied Kanal 2's cable frequencies in Copenhagen. Although it was inspired by Sørdags-Kanalen on the existing DR channel, which constituted the legal monopoly of television in Denmark at the time, the show gave impulse to the new channel. Despite its success, Weekend-TV's finances were deteriorating over time, closing after one year on air. Some former Weekend-TV executives moved to the TV 2 project, which was later approved, to create Lykkehjulet (the local version of Wheel of Fortune) and Eleva2ren.

The interactive game element was added in 1989 with the addition of OsWALD, developed by a Danish man specifically for Eleva2ren. The technology used for this depended on the Jydsk Telefon 76 E model which was present in a substantial amount of Danish households at the time; the most popular game to use this format was Hugo, which was OsWALD's successor.

It was carried in Greenland on tape delay on KNR the following Thursday. The programme reportedly had a record audience of 1.8 million viewers at its apex. It was described as an "omnibus newspaper, but on television" because of its characteristics: the "victim of the week", an interview with a politician, a peculiar story and children's entertainment.

For the channel's twentieth anniversary, a special one-off edition, Eleva20ren, was broadcast on 1 October 2008.

== See also ==
- OsWALD
- Hugo
