= List of Hugo video games =

Hugo
- Genres: Various, including minigame complications, platform games, educational games, third-person shooters, endless runners, and online slot games
- Developers: Silverrock Productions / ITE; Laguna Video Games; Kiloo ApS; Progressive Media; Hugo Games; Bit Managers; Kemco; Fuzzy-Frog Games
- Publishers: Silverrock Productions / ITE; Egmont Interactive; Electronic Arts; Namco; Kiloo ApS; Krea Medie; Laguna Video Games; Infogrames; Hugo Games; 5th Planet Games; Play'n GO
- Creators: Ivan Sølvason and Niels Krogh Mortense
- Platforms: Commodore 64, Amiga, MS-DOS, Windows, Game Boy, Game Boy Color, Game Boy Advance, PlayStation, PlayStation 2, Wii, Mobile, Android, iOS
- First release: Skærmtrolden Hugo; December 1990
- Latest release: Hugo: Up & Away; September 2022
- Parent series: Hugo

The Hugo media franchise includes numerous video games either based on or inspired by the interactive television game show of the same title originally developed by the Danish company ITE Media. Dozens of games spanning different genres have been released internationally on various platforms since 1990, and have sold over 10 million copies as of 2008.

== Game show adaptations ==
=== Skærmtrolden Hugo ===
The first Hugo game, based on the original Hugo television show Eleva2ren, was developed by Thomas Villadsen and Uffe Jakobsen for SilverRock Productions (later Interactive Television Entertainment and ITE Media). Skærmtrolden Hugo was originally released for the Commodore 64 and Amiga computers before Christmas 1990 and internationally (as just Hugo in the English language version) in 1991, and then ported to MS-DOS. The game takes place in an old gold mine filled with dangers, which Hugo has to navigate to find a treasure room. Its gameplay mechanics are simple and completing the entire game may take less than ten minutes. Skærmtrolden Hugo became Denmark's best-selling game with 30,000 copies sold during the Christmas campaign.

=== Classic Hugo series ===
Between 1991 and 2000, ITE Media adapted their classic Hugo TV show format into more than a dozen various video games consisting of different TV scenarios and published for several computer and console platforms. Two games, Hugo (originally titled Hugo - På Nye Eventyr: Del 1) and its sequel, Hugo 2 (originally Hugo - På Nye Eventyr: Del 2), were released for the Amiga in 1991 and 1992, and for the PC in 1992–1993. They were re-released as a 1994 Amiga compilation, Hugo (Hugo På Nye Eventyr), ported to the PC in 1995 and internationally retitled as Hugo 3. Later PC releases included Hugo 4 (1996, originally Hugo: Äventyret Går Vidare), Hugo 5 (1997), and Hugo 6: Wild River (1998), as well as their updated compilations: Hugo Gold (1998), Hugo Platin (1999), and Hugo XL (1999). The early 2000s Hugo Classic Collection again compiled the games in the releases Hugo Classic 1 through Hugo Classic 4.

=== Hugo: Jungle Island series ===
Several video game adaptations of the television game show of the same title were developed and published by ITE Media during the early 2000s.

== Agent Hugo series ==
The Agent Hugo series is a James Bond parody themed reboot of the Hugo franchise developed and published by ITE Media. The original Agent Hugo was released only in Europe in 2005, followed by Agent Hugo: Roborumble (2006), Agent Hugo: Lemoon Twist (2007), and Agent Hugo: Hula Holiday (2008). Unlike the classic Hugo games, the games in this series were not compilations of simple scenarios from the television show, but full-fledged third-person perspective action games similar to some of the earlier standalone Hugo games.

Game	Details
Agent Hugo Original release date: EU: October 2005	Release years by system: 2005 – Windows, PlayStation 2
Agent Hugo Original release date: EU: October 2005	Notes: Developed and published by ITE Media.; Planned to also be released on the GameCube, but was canceled.
Agent Hugo: Roborumble Original release dates: EU: October 6, 2006; EU: April 2, 2007	Release years by system: 2006 – Windows, PlayStation 2, Mobile; 2007 – Game Boy Advance
Agent Hugo: Roborumble Original release dates: EU: October 6, 2006; EU: April 2, 2007	Notes: Developed by ITE Media for the PlayStation 2 and by Program-Ace for the Game Boy Advance; published on both platforms by ITE Media.
Agent Hugo: Lemoon Twist Original release dates: EU: November 5, 2007; EU: May 29, 2008	Release years by system: 2007 – Windows, PlayStation 2; 2008 – Wii
Agent Hugo: Lemoon Twist Original release dates: EU: November 5, 2007; EU: May 29, 2008	Notes: Developed by Coyote Console and published by ITE Media.
Agent Hugo: Hula Holiday Original release date: EU: December 6, 2008	Release years by system: 2008 – Windows, PlayStation 2, Wii
Agent Hugo: Hula Holiday Original release date: EU: December 6, 2008	Notes: Developed by Attractive Games and published by NDS Software.

== Other ITE Hugo games ==
=== Hugo Saves Christmas ===
A collection of Christmas-themed minigames published for the PC in 1998. In the game, Hugo has to foil the hateful Scylla's newest plot to ruin Christmas Eve for the children everywhere. This time round, he has to save Santa Claus from being imprisoned in the witch's main residence, the Skull Castle. Hugo needs to claim the entire castle for Santa by replacing its dark themes with Christmas decorations and eventually defeating Scylla herself. Also known as Hugo: PC Calendar, the game was released in Denmark as Hugo Redder Julen, in Germany as Hugo rettet das Weihnachtsfest, in Argentine as Hugo salva la Navidad, and in Russia as Кузя спасает Рождество. It was re-released as part of Trollbox 1 (packaged together with Hugo 5 and Stinky & Biber) in 2000.

=== Hugo: The Magic Oak ===
A collection of education minigames published for the PC in 1999. It was the first game starring Hugo's infant son Rat as the main character as Scylla's magic sends him deep into the Troll Forest, from where the player must guide him back to his family. It is also known as Hugo: Learn & Play, and as Hugo: Den Fortryllede Eg / Hugo: Leg Og Lær 1 in Denmark, Hugo: Tajemný les in Czechia, Hugo: Taikatammi in Finland, Hugo: El roble mágico in Argentina, Hugo: Die Zaubereiche in Germany, Hugo: Zaczarowany dąb in Poland, Hugo: Sihirli Meşe in Turkey, and Кузя и его друзья: Волшебное дерево in Russia.

=== Hugo: Scylla's Revenge ===
In this PC collection of minigames, the cruel witch Scylla has returned once again in a Christmas setting, but this time, she attempts to get rid of Santa Claus and all the elves forever. She casts a spell trapping them all in ice blocks, and they are now in danger of freezing inside unless Hugo can save them and defeat her. The game was released in Denmark as Hugo: Afskylias Hævn, and was also released in Germany as Hugo Wintergames 3, in Poland as Hugo: Gwiazdkowa przygoda (Hugo: Christmas Adventure), and in Russia as Кузя: Новый год (Kuzya/Hugo: New Year).

=== Hugo in the Hut ===
A 2000 game for the PC.

=== Hugo: New Year ===
Originally titled Kuzya: New Year, this Russian 2D platform video game for Windows was published by ITE and MediaHouse in 2001.

=== Hugo: The Bewitched Rollercoaster ===
In this 2001 PC collection of minigames, Scylla destroys the electrical power source at the amusement park in an attempt to spoil Hugo's children's good time. Hugo's son Rat and the fly Buzzy embark on a quest through time and space (including the ancient Egypt, the Wild West, the Stone Age, the Middle Ages, and ancient Rome) to find the items that would enable them to repair the rollercoaster and help their father get revenge on the witch. It was titled Hugo: Den Forheksede Rutschebane / Hugo: Leg Og Lær 3 in Denmark, Hugo: Taikavuoristorata in Finland, Hugo: Die verhexte Achterbahn in Germany, Hugo: Zaklęta Kolejka in Poland, and Кузька: Путешественник во времени (Kuzya/Hugo: Time traveler) in Russia.

=== Hugo: The Magic Journey ===
In this 2001 PC educational game, Hugo's daughter goes on a journey to find a treasure, lost by her ancestors when they had been attacked by Scylla centuries ago. It was titled Hugo: Den Magiske Rejse / Hugo: Leg Og Lær 2 in Denmark, Hugo: Cesta kolem světa (Around the World) in Czechia, Hugo: Fantastische Welt in Germany, Hugo Taikamatka in Finland, Hugo: Magiczna podróż in Poland, Hugo Sihirli Yolculuk in Turkey, and Кузя и его друзья: Большое путешествие (Kuzya/Hugo and His Fiends: A Great Trip) in Russia. The game was seen as scandalous by some in Turkey due to its depiction of the country.

=== Hugo: The Secrets of the Forest ===
In this 2002 PC educational game compilation of eight minigames, Scylla transforms a class of bunny children into stone while she searches the woods for a rare mushroom that she needs for her magic spells. Using a scroll that Scylla dropped, Hugo's daughter Ruth needs to collect ingredients to create an antidote to the evil enchantment. It was also titled Hugo: Den Magiske Trylledrik / Hugo: Leg Og Lær 4 in Denmark, Hugo Taikajuoma in Finland, Hugo: Der magische Zaubertrank in Germany, Hugo: Magiczny napój in Poland, Hugo: Ormanın Büyüsü in Turkey, and Волшебный Эликсир in Russia.

=== Hugo: The Forces of Nature ===
An educational game published for the PC in 2002. In this game, Scylla has left her lair for the witches' congress, leaving Don Croco alone with her book of spells. A resulting outbreak of magic unleashes a series of natural disasters the island where the Kikurians live. It is up to Hugo to stand up against the forces of nature and in the end to battle the returning Scylla as well. It was titled Hugo: Naturens Kræfter / Hugo: Leg Og Lær 6 in Denmark, Hugo: Sila prírody in Czechia, Hugo ja luonnonvoimat in Finland, Hugo im Bann der Elemente in Germany, Hugo: Siły natury in Poland, Hugo: Naturkrafterna in Sweden, Hugo: Doğanın Güçleri in Turkey, and Силы природы in Russia.

=== Hugo: Heroes of the Savannah ===
A 2002 educational game for the PC.

=== Hugo and the Animals of the Ocean ===
A 2002 educational game for the PC.

=== Hugo in Space ===
In this 2002 educational PC game, the evil Scylla and her army of minions travel to space in search of an asteroid located on the other side of Pluto. Its core is composed entirely of the rare black diamonds that would make her infinitely more powerful and turn all the creatures of troll forest into her slaves. Hugo, vacationing with his family in space at the time, once again sets out to thwart her plan, for which they need to complete five missions across the Solar System to collect enough spaceship fuel to fight their way through Scylla's space fleet to reach her mining base and blow it up along with the asteroid, after which they chase after her personal spaceship to destroy it too before she can return to Earth. It was released as Hugo På Rumfart / Hugo: Leg Og Lær 8 in Denmark, Hugo Avaruudessa in Finland, Hugo im Weltraum in Germany, Hugo w kosmosie in Poland, and Кузя в космосе in Russia.

=== Hugo Frog Fighter ===
A 2002 game for the PlayStation, similar to an advanced version of Frogger.

=== Hugo: Smakkaball ===
Published for the PC in 2003. Together with his family, his friends, and even his sworn enemies, Hugo joins a "smakkaball" arena sport tournament. It was released in Russia as Кузя: Троллебол (Kuzya: Trolloboi).

=== Hugo: Runamukka ===
A 2004 PC top-down action game.

=== Hugo: Penguin Battle ===
Published in 2005 for the PC. In this game, Scylla uses cloning magic to form an army of evil penguins, led by copies of herself, and attempts to freeze the entire world to conquer it. It is up to Hugo in his "hugocopter" to melt the ice and restore it, and to stop the witch once again by destroying all of the clones. It was titled Hugo: Schlacht im ewigen Eis (Battle in Eternal Ice) in Germany, Hugo: Bitwa Pingwinów in Poland, and Кузя спасает лето (Hugo/Kuzya Saves Summer) in Russia.

== Non-ITE Hugo games ==
=== Hugo (1994 Game Boy game) ===
Hugo for the Game Boy was released by Laguna Video Games as a different title from the 1990s series, despite sharing the same title. The game is actually a conversion of Crazy Castle 2 by Kemco. In the game's story, Hugo's wife Hugolina is kidnapped by the Horned King, ruler of the castle Arbarus (in the game's more usual in-development story, Hugolina was to be held in the castle by Hugo's archenemy, the witch Scylla), and Hugo has to free her and defeat the King.

=== Hugo: New Year 2 ===
Originally titled Кузя: Новый год 2, it is 2D platform game developed by NDS Denmark and published by MediaHouse for Windows in 2001.

=== Hugo: Magic in the Troll Woods ===
Originally titled Hugo: Magi i Troldeskoven in Denmark (Hugo - Zauberei im Trollwald in Germany, Hugo: Magi i Trollskogen in Sweden), this platform game was developed by Attractive Games and published by Krea Medie in 2009 for the PlayStation 2, Wii, Windows, and Nintendo DS. It is a complete reboot of the series, featuring an entirely alternative Hugo the troll character as an apprentice sorcerer in another world.

=== Hugo Troldeakademiet: Den Forsvundne Kæmpe ===
A 2010 platform game published by Krea Medie for the Nintendo DS in Denmark, besides a Swedish version titled Hugo: Den Försvunna Jätten. It is the first sequel to Hugo: Magic in the Troll Woods.

=== Hugo Troldeakademiet: Kampen om Krystalkortet ===
Also known as Hugo: Jakten på Kristallkartan, it is a 2010 game published by Krea Medie for the Nintendo DS as the third entry in their reboot series.

=== Hugo: Game Factory ===
Originally titled Hugo Spielewerkstatt (other titles include Hugo: Fabryka Gier in Poland), it is a 2D platform game creator developed by Krea Medie and originally published by UIG Entertainment in December 2010.

=== Hugo: The Adventure with English ===
An educational video game for Windows originally published in Russia by MediaHouse. A Polish version was released by Cenega as Hugo: Przygoda z angielskim.

=== Hugo: The Adventure with English 2 ===
A Russian educational video game for Windows published by MediaHouse.

=== Hugo: De Första Tecknen ===
A Swedish video game published by Krea Medie for Windows in 2010 (Hugo: Ensimmäiset Merkit in Finland).

=== Hugo: Utmaningen i Tornet ===
A Swedish platform game published by Krea Medie for Windows in 2010 (Hugo: Tornin Arvoitus in Finland).

=== Hugo World ===
A freemium village management game published by Hugo Games and officially launched in 2014, this game was set in a traditional Hugo universe and the classic characters such as Hugo's wife Hugolina and their children return along with Scylla and her companion Don Croco. It was last updated in 2017 and discontinued in 2023.

=== Hugo Troll Wars ===
A Clash of Clans style free-to-play online real-time strategy / tower defense hybrid published by Hugo Games for a variety of platforms, including Kindle, Android, iOS, Windows, and Facebook, and originally launched for iOS devices in 2013, this game was set in alternate Hugo universe, where the players take role of a commander for either Hugo, the King of Trolls, or his mortal enemy Scylla, the evil Queen of Witches in the eternal conflict between the two sides. It featured a PvP multiplayer mode and social game elements. It was last updated in 2015 and discontinued in 2023.

=== Ronaldo & Hugo: Superstar Skaters ===
A free-to-play endless runner mobile game developed by Fuzzy-Frog Games and published by Hugo Games for Android and iOS, it features the football star Cristiano Ronaldo.

=== Hugo Flower Flush ===
A tile-matching video game published by Hugo Games and soft-launched for the iOS and Android in 2015. In it, Hugo and Hugolina must collect a rare Enchanted Flowers before Scylla can use them as ingredients for an evil spell.

=== Hugo Troll Race 2: Rail Rush ===
A follow-up to the original Hugo Troll Race, this title is an endless runner game developed by Fuzzy-Frog Games and published by 5th Planet Games in 2016 for Android and iOS. In this clone of Subway Surfers, the player controls either Hugo or Hugolina attempting to rescue the other from being kidnapped. The game's two constantly alternating stages have the chosen troll either driving a mine cart to chase after the broom-flying Scylla, or running away from the witch to defeat her with a successfully deflected spell.

=== Hugo Adventure: The Mystery Islands ===
Originally announced as Hugo Mystery Island.

=== Hugo (2016) ===
An online slot game developed by 5th Planet Games and published by Play'n GO in August 2016. Like Hugo Retro Mania, the game is based on the minigame scenarios "Labyrinth" and the endgame "Ropes" from the original TV show and some classic games.

=== Hugo 2 (2018) ===
An online slot game developed by 5th Planet Games and published by Play'n GO in November 2018, it is an adaptation of the scenario "Ice Cave" from the TV show and some of the classic games.

=== Hugo Goal ===
An online slot game developed by 5th Planet Games and published by Play'n GO in May 2018.

=== Hugo's Adventure ===
An online slot game developed by 5th Planet Games and published by Play'n GO in September 2019.

=== Hugo Carts ===
An online slot game developed by 5th Planet Games and published by Play'n GO in August 2021.

=== Hugo: Up & Away ===
An online multiplayer crash game developed by Spearhead Studios and published by FunFair Games in partnership with copyright holder 5th Planet Games in September 2022.

=== Hugo Legacy ===
An online slot game released by Play'n GO in August 2023.
