= Interactive Television Entertainment =

Defunct Danish media company

Interactive Television Entertainment ApS
- Formerly: SilverRock Productions
- Industry: Interactive media
- Founded: 1988
- Founder: Ivan Sølvason
- Defunct: 2010
- Fate: Purchased by NDS Group in 2006 and renamed NDS Denmark; Rights to Hugo franchise divested to Krea Medie A/S in 2008; NDS Denmark closed in 2010
- Successor: NDS Denmark
- Headquarters: Copenhagen, Denmark
- Products: Video games TV shows
- Owner: News Corporation (1980-2013)
- Parent: NDS Group

Interactive Television Entertainment (ITE) was a Copenhagen-based Danish company founded in 1988 as SilverRock Productions and renamed ITE in 1992. It was best known for developing and producing the Hugo media franchise.

== History ==
The company was founded by Ivan Sølvason in 1988. It was renamed as Interactive Television Entertainment in 1992, following the launch of the first Hugo TV show in 1990, which was created together with Niels Krogh Mortensen. Following the success of Hugo, the originally small company would grow to 19 permanent employees and about 50 contracted freelancers by 1994. ITE Media game development and publishing company was founded for the development of Hugo video game series in 1998.

Besides its successful Hugo shows and game adaptations, the company's television products included the motion capture system Animation Mask System (AMS) developed in 1993 and the programs Crazy Cartoon Soccer (1995), Throut and Neck (1997), The Interactive Cartoon Show (1998), Stinky & Bäver (Stinky & Stomper), Sporty, and Tush Tush. ITE opened overseas offices in Los Angeles in 1997, in Tokyo in 1998, and in London in 1999. By 2005, ITE was regarded as one of Denmark's five largest video game developers. In 2000, ITE had net sales of DKK 66 million. The company released over 190 video games, selling more than six million copies.

In 2002, Sølvason was forced to sell all of ITE to the venture capital company Olicom A/S for only DKK 5 million, having lost an earlier offer of DKK 80 million in 2000 due to a 10-minute fax delay by advising company Arthur Andersen's corporate finance division; Olicom had already owned 50% shares in ITE since 2001 (acquired for DKK10 million). Olicom then invested $22 million into the company, reduced the staff of ITE by a third to 60 employees and attempted to expand more into the U.S., UK, and Asian markets. Olicom in turn sold ITE in 2006, by then staffed by only 35 employees. ITE was purchased by NDS Group for an undisclosed sum and became NDS Denmark; NDS Denmark closed down in 2010, but without rights to Hugo franchise, which was divested to Krea Medie A/S in 2008. ITE's last CEOs were Steen Lohse between January–August 2006, and Jesper Knutsson after him.
