= List of skateboarding video games =

The following is a list of all skateboarding-based sports video games ordered by release year.

== Franchises ==
- Skate
- Tony Hawk's

== Legend ==
Video game platforms
| Arcade | Arcade video game | ATR26 | Atari 2600, Atari 2800 | ATR78 | Atari 7800 |
| C64 | Commodore 64 | CPC | Amstrad CPC | DS | Nintendo DS, DSiWare, iQue DS |
| GB | Game Boy | GBA | Game Boy Advance, iQue GBA | GCN | GameCube |
| iOS | iOS, iPhone, iPod, iPadOS, iPad, visionOS, Apple Vision Pro | DOS | PC DOS / MS-DOS, Windows 3.X | NES | Nintendo Entertainment System / Famicom |
| NS | Nintendo Switch | NS2 | Nintendo Switch 2 | OSX | macOS |
| PS1 | PlayStation 1 | PS2 | PlayStation 2 | PS3 | PlayStation 3 |
| PS4 | PlayStation 4 | PS5 | PlayStation 5 | PSP | PlayStation Portable |
| PSV | PlayStation Vita | Wii | Wii, WiiWare, Wii Virtual Console | WIN | Windows, all versions Windows 95 and up |
| XB | Xbox, Xbox Live Arcade | XB360 | Xbox 360, Xbox 360 Live Arcade | XBO | Xbox One |
| XBX/S | Xbox Series X/S | ZX | ZX Spectrum | | |

== Games ==
| Title | Release date | Platform | Developer | Publisher | Ref. |
|---|---|---|---|---|---|
| 720° | 1986 | Arcade | Atari Games | | |
| Skate Boardin' | 1987 | ATR26 | Absolute Entertainment | Activision | |
| California Games | 1987 | C64 | Epyx | | |
| Skate or Die! | 1987 | C64 | Electronic Arts | | |
| Super Skateboardin' | 1988 | ATR78 | Absolute Entertainment | Activision | |
| Town & Country Surf Designs: Wood & Water Rage | 1988 | NES | Atlus | LJN | |
| Pro Skateboard Simulator | 1988 | CPC, ZX | Codemasters | | |
| Skateboard Joust | 1989 | ZX, CPC, C64 | James Closs | Silverbird | |
| California Games II | 1990 | DOS | Epyx | | |
| Skate or Die 2: The Search for Double Trouble | 1990 | NES | Electronic Arts | | |
| Skate or Die: Bad 'N Rad | 1990 | GB | Konami | | |
| Skate or Die: Tour de Thrash | 1991 | GB | Realtime Associates | Electronic Arts | |
| Town & Country II: Thrilla's Surfari | 1992 | NES | Sculptured Software | LJN | |
| ESPN Extreme Games | 1995 | PS1 | SISA | SCE | |
| 2Xtreme | 1996 | PS1 | SISA | SCE | |
| Top Skater | 1997 | Arcade | Sega AM3 | Sega | |
| Air Boarder 64 | 1998 | N64 | Human Entertainment | | |
| Street Sk8er | 1998 | PS1 | Atelier Double | Micro Cabin | |
| 3Xtreme | 1999 | PS1 | 989 Studios | | |
| Tony Hawk's Pro Skater | 1999 | PS1 | Neversoft | Activision | |
| Thrasher Presents Skate and Destroy | 1999 | PS1 | Z-Axis | Rockstar Games | |
| Street Sk8er 2 | 2000 | PS1 | Atelier Double | Electronic Arts | |
| Grind Session | 2000 | PS1 | Shaba Games | SCE | |
| MTV Sports: Skateboarding Featuring Andy Macdonald | 2000 | PS1, WIN | Darkblack | THQ | |
| Tony Hawk's Pro Skater 2 | 2000 | PS1 | Neversoft | Activision | |
| Tech Deck Skateboarding | 2001 | GB | Handheld Games | Activision | |
| Yanya Caballista: City Skater | 2001 | PS2 | Cave | Koei | |
| ESPN X Games Skateboarding | 2001 | PS2 | Konami Osaka | Konami | |
| Disney's Extremely Goofy Skateboarding | 2001 | WIN | Krome Studios | Disney Interactive | |
| Tony Hawk's Pro Skater 3 | 2001 | PS2, PS1, GCN | Neversoft | Activision | |
| Disney Sports Skateboarding | 2002 | GBA, PS2 | Konami Computer Entertainment Osaka | Konami | |
| Evolution Skateboarding | 2002 | GCN, PS2 | Konami Osaka | Konami | |
| Tony Hawk's Pro Skater 4 | 2002 | PS2, PS1, GCN | Neversoft | Activision | |
| The Simpsons Skateboarding | 2002 | PS2 | Mass Media, The Code Monkeys | Electronic Arts, Fox Interactive | |
| Disney's Extreme Skate Adventure | 2003 | GCN, PS2, XB, GBA | Toys for Bob, Vicarious Visions | Activision | |
| Tony Hawk's Underground | 2003 | PS2, GCN, XB, GBA | Neversoft | Activision | |
| Go! Go! Hypergrind | 2003 | GCN | Poponchi | Atlus USA | |
| Backyard Skateboarding | 2004 | WIN, OSX | Humongous Entertainment | Atari, Inc. | |
| Tony Hawk's Underground 2 | 2004 | PS2, GCN, XB | Neversoft | Activision | |
| Tony Hawk's American Wasteland | 2005 | PS2, GCN, XB, XB360 | Neversoft | Activision | |
| Tony Hawk's Downhill Jam | 2006 | DS | Vicarious Visions | Activision | |
| Tony Hawk's Project 8 | 2006 | PS2, XB, PS3, XB360, PSP | Neversoft | Activision | |
| Skate | 2007 | PS3, XB360 | EA Black Box | Electronic Arts | |
| Tony Hawk's Proving Ground | 2007 | DS, PS2, PS3, Wii, XB360 | Neversoft | Activision | |
| Skate It | 2008 | DS, Wii | EA Black Box | Electronic Arts | |
| Tony Hawk's Motion | 2008 | DS | Creat Studios | Activision | |
| Skate City Heroes | 2008 | Wii | Zeroscale | Zoo Games | |
| Skate 2 | 2009 | PS3, XB360 | EA Black Box | Electronic Arts | |
| Skate 3 | 2010 | PS3, XB360 | EA Black Box | Electronic Arts | |
| Shaun White Skateboarding | 2010 | WIN, PS3, Wii, XB360 | Ubisoft Montreal | Ubisoft | |
| OlliOlli | 2014 | PSV | Roll7 | | |
| OlliOlli2: Welcome to Olliwood | 2015 | PS4, PSV | Roll7 | | |
| Tony Hawk's Pro Skater 5 | 2015 | PS3, PS4, XB360, XBO | Robomodo | Activision | |
| Skater XL | 2020 | PS4, WIN, XBO | Easy Day Studios | | |
| The Ramp | 2021 | NS, WIN | Paul Schnepf | Hyperparadise | |
| Skatebird | 2021 | WIN, XBO, NS, PS4, PS5 | Glass Bottom Games | | |
| OlliOlli World | 2022 | NS, PS4, PS5, WIN, XBO, XBX/S | Roll7 | Private Division | |
| Session: Skate Sim | 2022 | PS4, PS5, WIN, XBO, XBX/S | Crea-ture Studios | Nacon | |
| Bomb Rush Cyberfunk | 2023 | NS, WIN | Team Reptile | | |
| Helskate | 2025 | WIN, OSX | Phantom Coast | | |
| Skate City: New York | 2025 | iOS | Snowman | | |
| Driftwood | 2025 | WIN | Stoked Sloth Interactive | | |
| Skate Story | 2025 | OSX, NS2, PS5, WIN | Sam Eng | Devolver Digital | |

== See also ==
- Sports game
