= Star Trek: 25th Anniversary =

Star Trek: 25th Anniversary may refer to:

- the 1991 celebration of the Star Trek franchise, which began with the 1966 TV series Star Trek (aka Star Trek: The Original Series)
- Star Trek: 25th Anniversary (computer game), a 1992 video game for the MS-DOS, Amiga and Macintosh
- Star Trek: 25th Anniversary (NES video game), a 1992 video game for the Nintendo Entertainment System
- Star Trek: 25th Anniversary (Game Boy video game), a 1992 video game for the Nintendo Game Boy
- Star Trek, a 1991 pinball machine sometimes referred to as Star Trek 25th Anniversary Pinball
