= 1986 in video games =

1986 saw many sequels and prequels in video games, such as Super Mario Bros.: The Lost Levels, along with new titles such as Arkanoid, Bubble Bobble, Castlevania, Dragon Quest, Ikari Warriors, The Legend of Zelda, Metroid, Out Run and R.B.I. Baseball. The year's highest-grossing arcade video games were Hang-On in Japan, Hang-On and Gauntlet in the United States, and Nemesis (Gradius) in London. The year's best‑selling home system was the Family Computer and Nintendo Entertainment System for the third year in a row, while the year's best-selling home video games in Western markets were Super Mario Bros. in the United States and Yie Ar Kung-Fu in the United Kingdom.

Video game developer Masahiro Sakurai considers 1986 the most incredible year for the video game industry. He cited the release of several games that were the beginning of popular and long-lasting franchises such as The Legend of Zelda, Dragon Quest, Castlevania, and Kunio-kun. He attributed their release to new hardware like the Family Computer Disk System and megabit ROMs that afforded developers with greater memory storage, which allowed for more creative possibilities. Sakurai noted that the better games in the competitive market generated more appeal.

== Financial performance ==
In the United States, the home video game industry recovered with the arrival of the third generation of video game consoles led by the Nintendo Entertainment System (NES).

=== Highest-grossing arcade games ===
==== Japan ====
In Japan, the following titles were the highest-grossing arcade games of 1986, according to the Game Machine charts.

Rank	Title	Arcade cabinet	Points		
Rank	Title	Arcade cabinet	January–June	July–December	Total
1	Hang-On	Ride-on / sit-down	1576	1679	3255
2	Major League	Table	968	1678	2646
3	Ikari (Ikari Warriors)	Table	992	1420	2412
4	Real Mahjong Haihai	Table	1062	1083	2145
5	Tehkan World Cup	Table	694	1152	1846
6	Space Harrier	Rolling type	887	949	1836
7	Gradius	Table	860	965	1825
8	Arkanoid	Table	—N/a	1719	1719
9	ASO: Armored Scrum Object	Table	898	820	1718
10	1942	Table	862	826	1688

==== United Kingdom and United States ====
In the United Kingdom and United States, the following titles were the highest-grossing arcade video games of 1986.

Rank	United Kingdom	United States			
Rank	Electrocoin (London)	RePlay	AMOA		Play Meter
Rank	Electrocoin (London)	RePlay	Dedicated	Conversion	Play Meter
1	Nemesis (Gradius)	Hang-On	Gauntlet	Mat Mania	Gauntlet
2	Hang-On	Gauntlet	Hang-On, Ikari Warriors, Speed Buggy, World Series	Choplifter, Hogan's Alley, 1942, Rush'n Attack	Unknown
3	Ikari Warriors	Mat Mania	Hang-On, Ikari Warriors, Speed Buggy, World Series	Choplifter, Hogan's Alley, 1942, Rush'n Attack	Unknown
4	Arkanoid	World Series	Hang-On, Ikari Warriors, Speed Buggy, World Series	Choplifter, Hogan's Alley, 1942, Rush'n Attack	Unknown
5	Super Sprint	Spy Hunter	Hang-On, Ikari Warriors, Speed Buggy, World Series	Choplifter, Hogan's Alley, 1942, Rush'n Attack	Unknown
6	Salamander	Pole Position II	—N/a	—N/a	Unknown
7	Rampage	Mania Challenge	—N/a	—N/a	Unknown
8	Enduro Racer	Ikari Warriors	—N/a	—N/a	Unknown
9	Konami GT (GT Racer)	Ghosts 'n Goblins	—N/a	—N/a	Unknown
10	Jail Break	Super Sprint	—N/a	—N/a	Unknown

=== Best-selling home systems ===
Rank	System(s)	Manufacturer	Type	Generation	Sales		
Rank	System(s)	Manufacturer	Type	Generation	Japan	USA	Worldwide
1	Family Computer / Nintendo Entertainment System	Nintendo	Console	8-bit	3,900,000	3,000,000	6,900,000+
2	Commodore 64 (C64)	Commodore	Computer	8-bit	—N/a	—N/a	2,500,000
3	Family Computer Disk System	Nintendo	Console	8-bit	2,000,000	—N/a	2,000,000
4	Commodore 128 (C128)	Commodore	Computer	8-bit	—N/a	—N/a	1,000,000
5	Apple II	Apple Inc.	Computer	8-bit	—N/a	—N/a	700,000
6	NEC PC-88 / PC-98	NEC	Computer	8-bit / 16-bit	510,000	Unknown	510,000+
7	Sega SG-1000 / Master System	Sega	Console	8-bit	280,000	125,000	405,000+
8	Mac	Apple Inc.	Computer	16-bit	—N/a	—N/a	380,000
9	Amiga	Commodore	Computer	16-bit	—N/a	—N/a	200,000
9	Atari ST	Atari Corporation	Computer	16-bit	—N/a	—N/a	200,000

=== Best-selling home video games ===
==== Japan ====
In Japan, home video games that sold at least one million copies in 1986 include The Hyrule Fantasy: Zelda no Densetsu (The Legend of Zelda), which sold 1 million copies for the Family Computer Disk System (FDS) on its first day of release in February; Dragon Quest, which sold over 1 million cartridges for the Famicom (Nintendo Entertainment System) within six months between May and November; and Gradius, which sold over 1 million between April and December.

According to Famicom Tsūshin (Famitsu) magazine, the following titles were the top ten best-selling 1985-1986 releases during the three-year sales tracking period between May 1986 (when Famitsu began tracking sales) and mid-1989.

Rank	Title	Developer	Publisher	Genre	Platform	Sales
1	Pro Yakyū: Family Stadium (R.B.I. Baseball)	Namco	Namco	Sports (baseball)	Family Computer	< 2,050,000
2	Super Mario Bros.	Nintendo	Nintendo	Platformer	Family Computer	Unknown
3	Super Mario Bros. 2 (The Lost Levels)	Nintendo	Nintendo	Platformer	Family Computer Disk System	< 1,380,000
4	Ganbare Goemon! Karakuri Dōchū	Konami	Konami	Action-adventure	Family Computer	< 1,200,000
5	Takahashi Meijin no Bōken Jima (Adventure Island)	Hudson Soft	Hudson Soft	Platformer	Family Computer	< 1,050,000
6	Gegege no Kitaro: Youkai Daimakyou (Ninja Kid)	TOSE	Bandai	Action	Family Computer	Unknown
7	Makaimura (Ghosts 'n Goblins)	Capcom	Capcom	Platformer	Family Computer	Unknown
8	Dragon Quest (Dragon Warrior)	Chunsoft	Enix	Role-playing	Family Computer	1,000,000+
9	Dragon Ball: Shenlong no Nazo (Dragon Power)	TOSE	Bandai	Action	Family Computer	Unknown
10	Metroid	Nintendo		Action-adventure	Family Computer Disk System	Unknown

The following titles were the best-selling home video games on the bi-weekly Famitsu charts in 1986. Famicom Tsūshin magazine began tracking sales from May 1986.

Month	Weeks 1-2	Weeks 3-4	Ref
May	Gegege no Kitaro: Youkai Daimakyou (Famicom)		
June	Super Mario Bros. (Famicom)	Super Mario Bros. 2 (FDS)	
July	Makaimura (Famicom)		
August	Volleyball (FDS)	Ganbare Goemon! Karakuri Dōchū (Famicom)	
September	Ganbare Goemon! Karakuri Dōchū (Famicom)	Unknown	
October	Takahashi Meijin no Bōken Jima (Famicom)	Akumajō Dracula (FDS)	
November	Takahashi Meijin no Bōken Jima (Famicom)	Pro Wrestling - Famicom Wrestling Association (FDS)	
December	Dragon Ball: Shenlong no Nazo (Famicom)	Meikyū Kumikyoku (Famicom)	

==== United Kingdom ====
In the United Kingdom, the following titles were the top ten best-selling home video games of 1986, according to the annual Gallup software sales chart. The top ten titles were all home computer games. The best-selling game was Yie Ar Kung-Fu, making it the second year in a row that a fighting game topped the annual charts, after The Way of the Exploding Fist in 1985.

Rank	Title	Developer	Publisher	Genre
1	Yie Ar Kung-Fu	Konami	Imagine Software	Fighting
2	Formula 1 Simulator	Spirit Software	Mastertronic	Racing
3	Commando	Capcom	Elite Systems	Run-and-gun shooter
4	Green Beret	Konami	Imagine Software	Run-and-gun shooter
5	Thrust	Superior Software	Superior Software	Multi-directional shooter
6	Ghosts 'n Goblins	Capcom	Elite Systems	Platformer
7	Paperboy	Atari Games	Elite Systems	Action
8	Rambo	Ocean Software	Ocean Software	Run-and-gun shooter
9	Kik Start	Mastertronic	Mastertronic	Racing
10	Ninja Master	Tron Software	Firebird Software	Action

==== United States ====
In the United States, Super Mario Bros. for the Nintendo Entertainment System (NES) was the best-selling home video game of 1986. The following titles were the best-selling home video games on the bi-weekly FAO Schwarz charts in 1986, reported by Famicom Tsūshin (Famitsu) magazine from June 1986 onwards.

Month	Weeks 1-2	Weeks 3-4	Platform	Sales	Ref
June	Super Mario Bros.		Nintendo Entertainment System	Unknown	
July	Kung Fu	Unknown	Nintendo Entertainment System	Unknown	
August	Unknown	Super Mario Bros.	Nintendo Entertainment System	Unknown	
September	Kung Fu	Unknown	Nintendo Entertainment System	Unknown	
October	Unknown	Unknown	Unknown	Unknown	
November	Unknown	Unknown	Unknown	Unknown	
December	Unknown	Unknown	Unknown	Unknown	
1986	Super Mario Bros.		Nintendo Entertainment System	1,000,000+	

== Top-rated games ==
=== Major awards ===
Award	Amusement Players Association Awards (United States, January 1987)	Famitsu Best Hit Game Awards (Japan, February 1987)	5th Golden Joystick Awards (United Kingdom, March 1987)
Award	Arcade	Console	Computer
Game of the Year	Super Mario Bros.	Dragon Quest (Family Computer)	Gauntlet
Critics' Choice Awards	—N/a	Meikyuu Kumikyoku (Famicom); Nazo no Kabe (Famicom); Volleyball (Famicom); Zanac (Famicom Disk System)	—N/a
Best Scenario / Story	—N/a	Dragon Quest (Yuji Horii)	—N/a
Best Graphics / Visuals	Out Run	Akumajō Dracula (Castlevania)	—N/a
Best Music / Soundtrack	—N/a	The Hyrule Fantasy: Zelda no Densetsu (Koji Kondo)	Sanxion
Best Audio	Gauntlet	—N/a	—N/a
Best Character Design	—N/a	Dragon Quest (Akira Toriyama)	—N/a
Best Port	—N/a	Ghosts 'n Goblins (Famicom)	—N/a
Original / Innovative	Gauntlet	—N/a	The Sentinel
Best Hardware	—N/a	Family Trainer (Power Pad)	—N/a
Best Software House	—N/a	—N/a	Elite Systems
Best Programmer	—N/a	Koichi Nakamura (Dragon Quest)	Andrew Braybrook
Best Arcade-Style Game	—N/a	—N/a	Uridium
Best Action Game	—N/a	Metroid (Famicom)	—N/a
Best Platform Game	—N/a	Super Mario Bros. 2 (Famicom Disk System)	—N/a
Best Shooting Game	—N/a	Gradius (Famicom)	—N/a
Best Adventure Game	—N/a	—N/a	The Pawn
Best RPG	—N/a	Dragon Quest (Famicom)	—N/a
Best Sports Game	—N/a	Pro Yakyū: Family Stadium (R.B.I. Baseball)	—N/a
Best Puzzle Game	—N/a	Kineko (Famicom Disk System)	—N/a
Best Strategy Game	—N/a	—N/a	Vietnam

=== Famitsu Platinum Hall of Fame ===
The following 1987 video game release entered Famitsu magazine's "Platinum Hall of Fame" for receiving a Famitsu score of at least 35 out of 40.

Title	Platform	Score (out of 40)	Developer	Publisher	Genre
Pro Yakyū: Family Stadium (R.B.I. Baseball)	Family Computer	35	Namco	Namco	Baseball

== Business ==
- New companies: Majesco, Ubi Soft, Bethesda Softworks, Famitsu, FromSoftware
- Defunct: Imagic.
- June 13 – Activision merges with Infocom.
- Activision acquires Gamestar Software.
- Sinclair Research Ltd. is acquired by Amstrad.

== Notable releases ==
Arcade

- February – Namco releases Sky Kid Deluxe, their first game to use a Yamaha YM2151 FM sound chip.
- February – SNK releases Ikari Warriors, which shares many elements with Taito's Front Line from 1982, but adds two-player simultaneous play and visuals closer to 1985's Commando. It is SNK's breakthrough game in the US.
- April – Sega releases Wonder Boy, the first in the series.
- July 8 – Namco releases The Return of Ishtar, which is the sequel to The Tower of Druaga.
- July – Ten years after Atari's Breakout, Taito releases Arkanoid, which adds power-ups and unique levels and generally reinvigorates the concept.
- August 4 – Taito releases Bubble Bobble.
- September 20 – Sega releases the Out Run racing game.
- October 1 – Namco releases Genpei Tōma Den.
- December – Namco releases Rolling Thunder, distributed outside Japan by Atari Games.

Console

- February 21 – Nintendo releases The Legend of Zelda (designed by Shigeru Miyamoto for the Family Computer Disk System), the first game in The Legend of Zelda series.
- May 27 – Enix releases Dragon Quest for the Famicom, which is usually considered the foremost Japanese role-playing video game, and is the first game in a series that has been phenomenally successful in Japan.
- June 3 – Nintendo releases Super Mario Bros.: The Lost Levels as the sequel to the Super Mario Bros.. The game was not released in North America, partially because it was deemed too difficult.
- August 6 – Nintendo releases Metroid by Makoto Kano, the first in the Metroid series.
- September 12 – Hudson Soft releases Adventure Island.
- September 26 – Konami releases Akumajō Dracula for the Famicom Disk System, the first game in the Castlevania series.
- November 1 – Sega releases Alex Kidd in Miracle World. It is the first game in the Alex Kidd series created for this character, and the most popular of all Alex Kidd games.
- December 10 – Namco releases Pro Baseball: Family Stadium for the Famicom, the first in the Famista series.
- December 19 – Nintendo releases Kid Icarus.

Computer

- January 1 – Commodore releases Mind Walker for the Amiga. It keeps running, unmodified, on all versions of the Amiga hardware and OS.
- May 6 – Infocom releases the highly regarded Trinity.
- July 8 – Llamasoft's founder Jeff Minter releases Iridis Alpha, a shoot 'em up game for the Commodore 64 computer
- August 15 – Electronic Arts releases open-ended space exploration adventure game Starflight, which goes on to sell a million copies.
- October – Sierra On-Line expands their "Quest" line with King's Quest III: To Heir Is Human and Space Quest I: The Sarien Encounter.
- New World Computing releases Might and Magic Book One: The Secret of the Inner Sanctum for the Apple II, the first installment in the Might and Magic series.
- Activision releases Labyrinth: The Computer Game. Developed by Lucasfilm Games, this is the first of the LucasArts adventure games.
- Froggy Software releases La femme qui ne supportait pas les ordinateurs, one of the first video games about cyber harassment and female experience on the internet, and one of the first games with an overtly feminist message.

=== Hardware ===
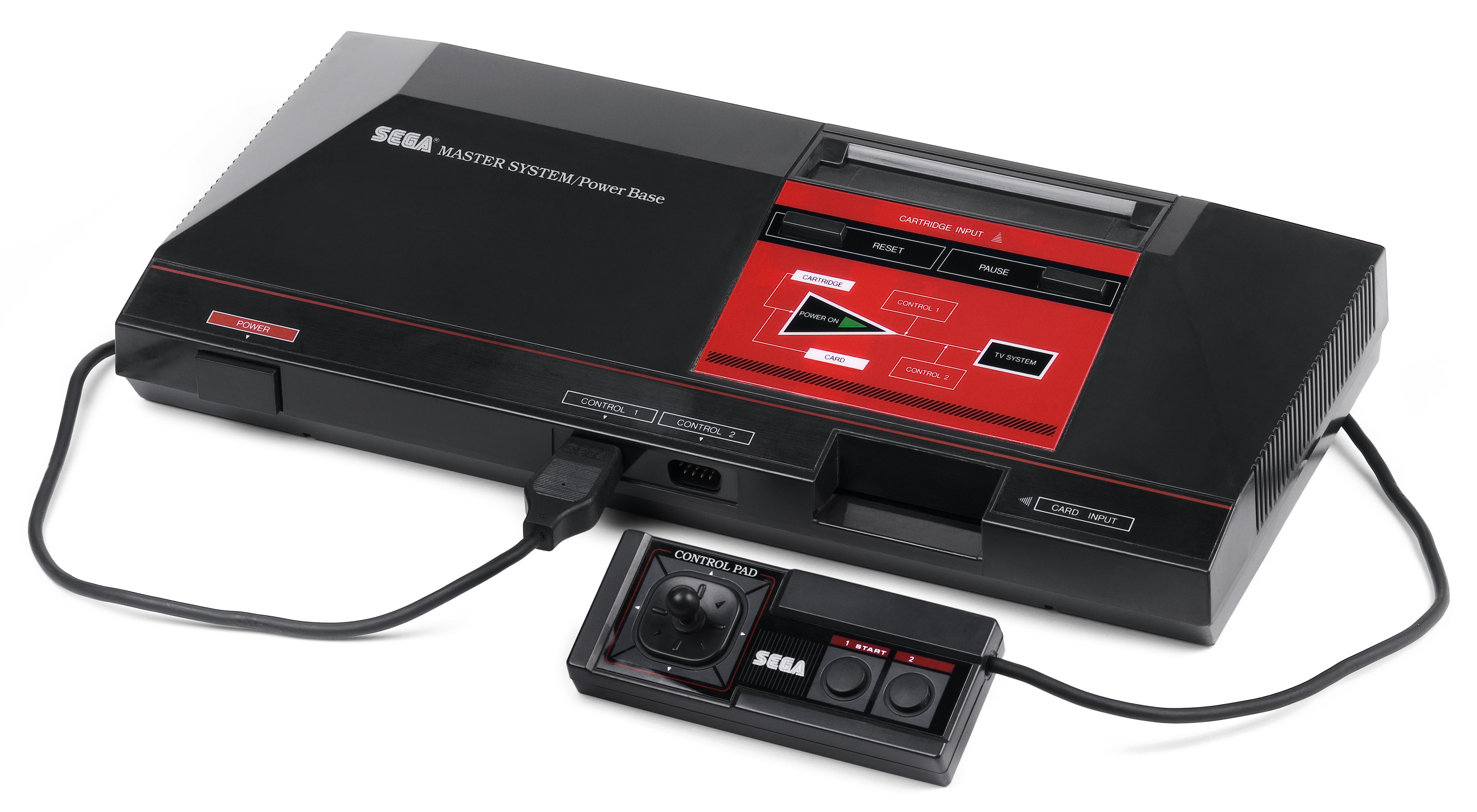
North American Master System

- September, Apple releases the final computer in the Apple II line, the 16-bit Apple IIGS with professional synthesizer-quality audio.
- Namco releases the Namco System 86 arcade system board.
- Atari Corporation releases:
1. The 1040ST personal computer, the second in the ST line. With a megabyte of RAM and a price of US$999, it is the first computer with a cost-per-kilobyte of under $1.
2. The Atari 7800 console two years after its original test market date.
3. A smaller model Atari 2600 for under US$50. The TV campaign proclaims "The fun is back!"
- Sega releases the Master System console in the US.
- Sharp releases the Twin Famicom home console only in Japan.
- Nintendo releases the Family Computer Disk System (an add-on for the Famicom) in Japan only.
- Texas Instruments releases the TMS34010, a CPU with graphics-oriented instructions. Eventually it powers arcade games such as Hard Drivin', Smash TV, Mortal Kombat, and NBA Jam.

== See also ==
- 1986 in games
