= Kings of the Beach =

1988 video game

- Commodore 64 cover art
- Developer(s): Electronic Arts; Konami (NES)
- Publisher(s): Electronic Arts; Ultra Games (NES)
- Composer(s): Rob Hubbard; Jun Funahashi (NES)
- Platform(s): C64, MS-DOS, NES
- Release: C64 & MS-DOS: NA: 1988; NES: NA: January 1990
- Genre(s): Sports (beach volleyball)
- Mode(s): Single-player

Kings of the Beach is a beach volleyball computer game released by Electronic Arts in 1988 for the Commodore 64 and MS-DOS. A version for the Nintendo Entertainment System was produced by Konami (under the Ultra Games label) in 1990.

== Gameplay ==
Screenshot gameplay

The player can play as Sinjin Smith and Randy Stoklos. The game features three modes of play: practice, match play and tournament. In the latter, the players progress through five beaches (San Diego, Chicago, Waikiki, Rio de Janeiro, and Australia) filled with increasingly challenging opponents. While Smith and Stoklos are joined by Ron Von Hagen, Tim Hovland and Mike Dodd as the only 'real' volleyball players featured in the game, EA spiced up the competition with some characters from other games, including Hard Hat Mack and Lester from Skate or Die and Ski or Die.

The gameplay controls for the console version are fairly simple, with the directional pad and two buttons doing all the work. In the PC version, players control three actions: bump, set, and block/spike. Diving for the ball occurs automatically. The only 'advanced' moves in the game are the ability to dink or perform a one-handed Kong block (Stoklos's trademark).

Another feature of the game is the ability to 'argue' calls with the referee, which occasionally allows players to get a point overturned, but if players argue too much, the referee may penalize them with a red card and deduct a point.
