= Skate or Die =

Skate or Die may refer to:

- Skate or Die!, a 1987 video game
  - Skate or Die 2: The Search for Double Trouble, a 1990 sequel for the NES.
- "SKATE OR DIE!", a phrase from the 1986 arcade game 720°.
- Skate or Die (film), a 2008 French action film
- Gleaming the Cube, or Skate or Die, a 1989 American teen action film
- "Skate or Die" (Law & Order), a 2009 TV episode
