= Lists of sports video games =

This is a list of lists of sports video games.

== Team sports ==
- List of American football video games
- List of association football video games
- List of Australian rules football video games
- List of baseball video games
- List of basketball video games
- List of cricket video games
- List of Handball Video Games
- List of ice hockey video games
- List of rugby union video games
- List of volleyball video games

== Individual sports ==
- List of fighting games
- List of golf video games
- List of professional wrestling video games
- List of racing video games
- List of skateboarding video games
- List of snowboarding video games
- List of sumo video games
- List of tennis video games
- Olympic video games
