= RF2 =

RF2 may refer to:

- Red Faction II, a 2002 video game
- rFactor 2, a 2013 video game
- Konami RF2 (a.k.a. Konami GT), a 1985 arcade game
