= F-1 Spirit (series) =

- Genre(s): Racing
- Developer(s): Konami
- Publisher(s): Konami
- First release: F-1 Spirit: The Way to Formula-1; 1987
- Latest release: F-1 Spirit; 1991

F-1 Spirit (エフワン スピリット) is a series of Formula One-based racing video games developed and published by Konami starting on the MSX in 1987.

== F-1 Spirit: The Way to Formula-1 ==
F-1 Spirit: The Way to Formula-1
- Japanese cover art
- Developer(s): Konami
- Publisher(s): Konami
- Composer(s): Kazuhiko Uehara; Motoaki Furukawa; Yoshinori Sasaki
- Platform(s): MSX home computer
- Release: JP: 1987; EU: 1987
- Genre(s): Racing
- Mode(s): Single-player, multiplayer

F-1 Spirit: The Way to Formula-1 is a top down Formula One racing game, developed and published by Konami, which was released for the MSX in Japan and Europe in 1987. The game engine is very similar to Konami's Road Fighter. It also features Konami's custom sound chip called Konami SCC (a five-channel chip that complements the three-channel PSG chip of the MSX computer system, or in other words, a sound custom chip that brings five voices more to the three voices of the PSG sound chip on the system), and great MSX1 graphics to go with it. It was one of the first ROM on MSX with this sound feature. Together with its "3D" spinoff (F-1 Spirit: 3D Special), F-1 Spirit: The Way to Formula-1 was the most extended racing game Konami released for the MSX.

Top-down view racing game

This third-person racing game features many different types of cars. Everything starts with stock cars, moving up to rally cars and Formula 3. The main goal is to finish at first place with Formula 1, the king class of racing. There are six types of races: Stock race, Rally, F3 race, F3000 race, Endurance race, and finally F1 races (16 tracks). Initially, the player can only race in the stock, rally and F3 races. As the player win races, he will accumulate points that will allow him to play new races. If the player finish a race at first place he will receive nine points. He gets eight points if he finishes second, etc. If the player finish 10th or later, he will not score any points. There are 16 different tracks for F1 cars. As the player wins races, he will be able to play more tracks in the F1 car category. To complete the game, the players must have to win all of the 16 F1 tracks. There's a grand total of 21 tracks. The first races are the easiest ones: the cars are slow and the enemies do not drive very well, but as the player classify for new tracks the difficulty will increase: F1 cars are fast and the players will need a great agility to win in F1 race.

The difficulty level can be set, the race track selected and the number of laps is variable. The field includes ready made and custom made cars (the player can select engine, tires, suspension). Avoiding the slower cars the player come up to lap can be crucial. During a race, the players can bump into other cars and into the side boards and other obstacles, but this will damage the player's car. In every track, there is a pit lane (labeled with the letters "PIT") where the players can fuel up and repair the car. Top speed will decrease if the engine is damaged and the players will lose time in every lap. When they are in the PIT STOP they can hold down the DOWN key to speed up car repairs, but the fuel intake will be slower. The fuel consumption is determined by the RPM meter (as in real car). F1 tracks cannot be won at the first race unless they become an ace driver. To win an F1 race, they must memorize each curve and play each race several times to know where to brake and where to accelerate.

An unlicensed Master System port was released by Zemina in the same year, as F1 스피리트.

A similar game, Chequered Flag, was released for the arcades in 1988.

=== A1 Spirit: The Way to Formula-1 ===
A special version of the original F-1 Spirit, A1 Spirit: The Way to Formula-1, was released as a pack-in with Panasonic's "Joy Handle" game controller. The chief differences are that it features futuristic vehicles instead of racing cars, different passwords (e.g. "PANASONIC" to see the ending demo), and some bugfixes.

== F-1 Spirit 3D Special ==
F-1 Spirit 3D Special
- Developer(s): Konami
- Publisher(s): Konami
- Composer(s): Goro Kin
- Platform(s): MSX2+
- Release: JP: 1988
- Genre(s): Racing
- Mode(s): Single-player, multiplayer

F-1 Spirit 3D Special (F1スピリット 3Dスペシャル) is a full successor to the game, and was released in 1988 for the MSX2+ spec. Unlike the original, this game uses scaling-based third-person graphics like Pole Position and the like, and focuses specifically on F-1 racing.

In addition to the Free Run and Grand Prix modes, there is a two player Battle Mode. The difficulty level can be set, and in Free Run a number of settings (such as the number of laps) is variable. Cars are custom made; the body and color of the car, the engine, the tires, the suspension, the brakes, the gear, and the wings can be all modified.

The new look of 3D Special

It was released on two floppy disks, and it's the only game Konami ever developed for the MSX2+ spec. This game featured a special cable which allowed two MSX2+ computers to be linked via the second joystick port. This cable was sold separately under the name JE700 Multiplayer Link Cable, and was also reverse-engineered by some enthusiasts for use in other games.

Another thing that makes this game special is that it uses MSX-Music ("FM-PAC"), the Yamaha YM2413 OPLL sound chip, originally sold separately or built into various models of the MSX2+ and MSX turboR computers. This is the only game in which Konami used that particular sound chip; other Konami games with enhanced music use Konami's own SCC sound chip. Even games distributed on floppy disk were often accompanied by a SCC ROM cartridge, like Snatcher and SD Snatcher. The original music was composed by Goro Kin (supposedly a pseudonym).

A similar product, F-1 Sensation, was released for the Family Computer in 1993. It contains many of the same features (though Battle Mode was dropped), but is based around the 1992 Formula One season.

== F-1 Spirit (Game Boy) ==
F-1 Spirit World Circuit Series The Spirit of F-1
- Japanese cover art
- Developer(s): Konami
- Publisher(s): JP: Konami; NA: Ultra; EU: Palcom Software
- Platform(s): Game Boy
- Release: JP: February 28, 1991; NA: March 1992; EU: 1992; JP: September 25, 1997 (Konami GB Collection Vol.1); EU: 2000 (Konami GB Collection Vol.1)
- Genre(s): Formula One racing
- Mode(s): Single-player, multiplayer

F-1 Spirit screenshots

F-1 Spirit (エフワン スピリット)), released in North America as World Circuit Series and in Europe as The Spirit of F-1, was released for the Game Boy in 1991. It is a top-viewed racing game like the original.

Players can compete in Formula 3, Formula 3000 and Formula 1. 25 different tracks from around the world are featured, with some of them only playable on the according class. As the players rise in class, tracks become longer (forcing pit stops), racers become faster and turns change from simple low angle corners which require no more than a slight trajectory, to elbow corners which require some skill to turn without losing speed.

It was later re-released on the first volume of Konami GB Collection in Japan and Europe, although it was renamed Konami Racing in all versions of this collection.

== F-1 Spirit remake ==
In 2004, an unlicensed remake of the original F-1 Spirit was released by Brain Games, chiefly for the 2004 Retro Remakes competition. In this context, it was developed as a successor to that team's Road Fighter remake.

This remake retains much of the gameplay and content of the original, but with changed physics, a number of sound and graphical improvements (some of the latter make the game resemble titles such as F-1 Grand Prix), and online leaderboards.

It was ported for Windows, Mac OS X, Linux and even ARM devices. Binary versions for Windows and OS X are provided, while .deb is provided for Ubuntu and Debian. For other Linux flavors or other OSes in general, the source code for the game is available as well.

== Soundtrack ==
F-1 Spirit & F-1 Spirit 3D Special

Soundtrack album by Konami Kukeiha Club
- Released: May 21, 1989
- Genre: Video game soundtrack
- Length: 19:04
- Label: King Records

MSX Racing Spirit Soundtracks

Soundtrack album by Konami Kukeiha Club
- Released: May 19, 2014
- Genre: Video game soundtrack
- Length: 38:31
- Label: EGG MUSIC RECORDS / D4Enterprise

- The game soundtrack of F-1 Spirit & F-1 Spirit 3D Special (F1スピリット&F1スピリット3Dスペシャル) was released on May 21, 1989 by King Records exclusively in Japan.
- The game soundtrack of MSX Racing Spirit Soundtracks (MSX レーシングスピリットサウンドトラック, MSX Rēshingu Supiritto Saundotorakku) was released on May 19, 2014 by EGG MUSIC RECORDS / D4Enterprise exclusively in Japan.

F-1 Spirit & F-1 Spirit 3D Special (19:04)
No.	Title	Length
1.	"F-1 Shuffle (Title)"	0:14
2.	"Starting Grid (Start)"	0:06
3.	"D/G (Select)"	0:34
4.	"Hot Summer Riding (Stock Car BGM)"	1:12
5.	"Random Approach (Rally BGM)"	0:49
6.	"Next (Ranking <Retire>)"	0:38
7.	"Self-Confidence (F3000 BGM)"	0:54
8.	"Vanishing Heat (Endurance BGM)"	0:46
9.	"Winning Run (Ranking <Goal>)"	0:32
10.	"F-1 Spirit (F1-BGM)"	1:02
11.	"Failed! (Pit~F-1 Spirit)"	0:32
12.	"Street Collection (Ending)"	1:28
13.	"Is it "Domingo" Today? (My Heart's Beating) (Title)"	0:44
14.	"Constructor (Select)"	0:43
15.	"Practice Makes Perfect (BGM 1)"	1:31
16.	"Turn on The Run (BGM 2)"	1:49
17.	"Out of Rap (BGM 3)"	1:20
18.	"Hot Road (BGM 4)"	0:46
19.	"Make What Haste You Can! (Pit)"	0:42
20.	"Big Don (Grand Prix Rank 1)"	0:32
21.	"Glory (Grand Prix Rank 2, 3)"	0:13
22.	"Light Step (Ranking)"	0:50
23.	"Calm Feelings (Ending)"	1:07

== See also ==
- Road Fighter - the first car racing game from Konami
- F1 Circus (series)
- F-1 Grand Prix (video game series)
- Battle Grand Prix
- F-Zero
- Top Gear (video game)
- Zero4 Champ series
- Ayrton Senna Kart Duel (series)
