= Konami's Open Golf Championship =

1994 arcade game

- Developer: Konami
- Publisher: Konami
- Platform: Arcade
- Release: 1994

Konami's Open Golf Championship is a 1994 arcade game developed and published by Konami. This game is a sequel to Konami's earlier arcade game Golfing Greats, released three years earlier in 1991, and it is known as Golfing Greats 2 in Japan. While the original Golfing Greats used the same hardware as Teenage Mutant Ninja Turtles: Turtles in Time, Golfing Greats 2 uses the SYSTEM-GX hardware, allowing for better graphics.

== Gameplay ==
Title screen

Konami's Open Golf Championship is a golf simulation played with a joystick.

== Reception ==
Next Generation reviewed the arcade version of the game, rating it two stars out of five, and stated that "This could have been a good game if its control were better, rather than the decent game it is."

== See also ==
- Ultra Golf
- ESPN Final Round Golf 2002
