= Motocross Maniacs =

1989 video game

- North American box art
- Developer: Konami
- Publishers: NA: Ultra Games; WW: Konami
- Composers: Michiru Yamane; Tsuyoshi Sekito
- Platform: Game Boy
- Release: JP: September 20, 1989; NA: January 1990; EU: 1991
- Genres: Racing, platform
- Modes: Single-player, multiplayer

Motocross Maniacs (モトクロス マニアックス) is a 1989 platform racing video game developed by Konami and published by Konami under the Ultra Games label for the Game Boy. It was later re-released in color as part of the Konami GB Collection compilation series, under the name Bikers.

== Summary ==
The player controls a motorcycle moving one way horizontally, much like Nintendo's Excitebike for the NES. When a level has been completed within its time limit, the player starts on the next.

With only eight different levels and fairly simple gameplay, the game's complexity is not too different from other Game Boy games released around the introduction of the system. Despite this, Motocross Maniacs requires quite some skill to master. Additionally, the game provides replay value by letting the player beat previous time records, which are announced at the completion of a level. The game's cartridge, however, does not retain these records after the Game Boy is turned off.

Two sequels were released, Motocross Maniacs 2 for the Game Boy Color and Motocross Maniacs Advance for the Game Boy Advance. Motocross Maniacs 2 is largely similar to the original, aside from the addition of championship mode where the player competes against computer-controlled racers. Motocross Maniacs Advance, however, did introduce major changes and more features, including revamped graphics, selectable characters, and newly-designed 2.5D levels.

== Gameplay ==
The player's control over the motorcycle allows moving the front wheel upwards or downwards, allowing for jumps over obstacles and rotating stunts when in the air. If the player lands incorrectly, the rider will fall off the bike and climb back on it. This is a main cause of time loss in the game.

The bike is provided with only limited fuel (represented as "TIME" bar), and the player must complete the course before running out of fuel. The game ends when the time limit is depleted.

The bike also has the ability to use nitrous oxide for a short speed boost. This allows for large jumps and can be necessary for making loops.

Nitrous power-ups can be obtained within a level (marked as a large "N"), but often they will require one to be used to get them in the first place. Thus when the player has depleted his supply, it can be very hard or even impossible to regain more boosts. Furthermore, some levels have sections that require one or more boosts to pass, making it nearly impossible to complete the level without any.

Other power-ups in the game include extra fuel (marked as "T"), increased speed (marked as "S", continues until the player crashes) and enhanced traction (marked as "R", also continues until the player crashes).

The player can also perform combos by making frontflips and backflips, and consecutive combos grants the player a flying booster (represented by "JET") that allows the bike to jump up high if several boosts are used.

Many levels offer multiple directions for the player. One usually contains extra power-ups and requires the use of boosts and agility to successfully traverse, while the other simply requires jumping obstacles on the ground, often including loose sand and gravel that will slow down the motorcycle.

=== Modes ===
There are eight different levels, which become harder to complete as they progress. Any level can be selected from the beginning of the game, together with an A, B or C difficulty level which determines the time available to complete the level.

The game has three different modes of play:

- Single player: One player completes level after level until their time runs out.
- Single player versus computer: Same as above, but also requires the player to beat the computer.
- Single player versus second player: Same as above, but with another human player.

For the two versus modes, the second player appears as a silhouette behind the player, similar to time trials in other racing games.

== Reception ==
In 2019, PC Magazine included MotoCross Maniacs in their "The 10 Best Game Boy Games" writing: "Simple yet deep gameplay will keep you coming back for more in this timeless motorsports title."
