= Motocross Maniacs Advance =

2002 video game

- Developer: Konami Computer Entertainment Hawaii
- Publisher: Konami
- Platform: Game Boy Advance
- Release: NA: March 21, 2002; JP: May 2, 2002; FR: May 31, 2002
- Genre: Racing
- Modes: Single-player, Multiplayer

Motocross Maniacs Advance is a 2002 racing video game developed and published by Konami for the Game Boy Advance. The game is the sequel to the 1989 Game Boy title Motocross Maniacs. Konami announced Motocross Maniacs Advance in December 2001, and showcased the game at E3 in May 2002. Upon release, the game received average reviews, with praise directed to its updated visual presentation and new game modes and criticism to its speed and difficulty.

== Gameplay ==
A screenshot of Motocross Maniacs Advance.

Motocross Maniacs Advance is a side-scrolling platform racer in which players must outrace three opponents on a course as one of six characters, whilst collecting power-ups dodging obstacles. Players control their bike by holding A to accelerate, pressing B to boot speed from nitros collected throughout the course, and the D-Pad to align the bike whilst midair. Power-ups, including rockets and land mines, can be deployed to speed up or disrupt other players. Courses have ramps and loops to traverse as well as obstacles to avoid.

The game features four gameplay modes. Championship Mode requires players to complete all six circuits across twelve courses, and features a story in which six characters from across the globe to enter a racing competition organised by a robot planning to take over the world. Attack mode features individual races, with the player racing to perform tricks for points in the Point race or racing against the clock in the Time Attack race. Action Mode includes three single-player and multiplayer minigames: Zombie Attack, where players known down ghouls by boosting into them, Hidden Lab, where players dodge hazards on a conveyor belt, and Bomb Tag, a game of hot potato with a bomb. Motocross Maniacs Advance supports local multiplayer gameplay for up to four players under the 4-Player Link Battle Mode, with Action Mode also supporting multiplayer using the multi-boot feature of the Game Boy Advance, allowing players to use the Game Link Cable to play the game with one cartridge.

== Reception ==
Reception

Aggregate score
Aggregator	Score
Metacritic	69%

Review scores
Publication	Score
AllGame	2.5/5
Electronic Gaming Monthly	
Famitsu	24/40
Game Informer	8.25/10
GamePro	3.4/5
GameSpot	6.2/10
IGN	6/10
Nintendo Power	3.3/5
Play	5/5
Game Boy Xtreme	86%

Motocross Maniacs Advance received "mixed or average" reviews, according to review aggregator Metacritic. Several critics positively evaluated the game's merits in comparison to the original Motocross Maniacs. Game Boy Xtreme considered the game to be a "nice improvement on the series" due to its "obvious boost" in visual quality, ability to race alongside competitors, and the inclusion of new game modes. However, describing the game as "not as much fun" as the original, IGN considered the use of the original game's flat design of courses and lack of collision was a "serious shortcoming", as "the designers tried way too hard to throw in as much as possible on the GBA screen". Several critics commended the gameplay as enjoyable, but others considered the game's speed was difficult to control. Electronic Gaming Monthly stated that obstacles were difficult to avoid as "the game moves pretty fast and the screen is so small". Despite enjoying the game's "complex environments" and range of "tracks and modes to play around with", Allgame found the game was "spoiled" by its "radically increased speed", stating "you can barely spot the power-ups, there's little chance to perform tricks, you barely ever see your opponents, and the only time a weapon makes a difference is when it's hitting you in the back."
