= Mission: Impossible (1990 video game) =

- North American cover art by Tom Dubois
- Developer: Konami
- Publisher: Ultra Games
- Programmer: Nobuhiro Matsuoka
- Artist: Noriyasu Togakushi
- Composers: Jun Funahashi; Yoshiyuki Hagiwara
- Platform: Nintendo Entertainment System
- Release: NA: September 1990; EU: November 28, 1991
- Genres: Action, Third-person shooter
- Mode: Single-player

Mission: Impossible is a 1990 overhead action-adventure video game developed by Konami and published by Ultra Games for the Nintendo Entertainment System (NES) based on the 1988 Mission: Impossible TV series.

== Plot ==
The objective of the IMF team is to solve a kidnapping case, as a terrorist group by the name of the Sinister 7 has kidnapped both a well-known scientist and Shannon Reed, another IMF operative. The chase will take place through the canals of Venice to the Swiss Alps, and the team is to infiltrate a number of hostile multiple-floor installations in pursuit of the hostages.

== Gameplay ==
The game is played from a top-down perspective. The player gets to control three IMF operatives from the TV series - Max, Grant and Nicholas - all of whom have different skills necessary for completion. The used character may be switched at any time in-game.

On the street at the very beginning of the game, civilians may not be harmed, and such activities will most certainly bring the mission to a highly embarrassing end, as local authorities proceed to arrest the attacker. While infiltrating an enemy's hideout, discretion is advised as detection by the surveillance system will bring security guards.

== Reception ==
Reception

Review scores
| Publication | Score |
|---|---|
| GamePro | 25/25 |
| Mean Machines | 86% |

Mean Machines gave an overall score of 86%, giving praise to the large game levels and creating a faithful rendition of the TV score, although giving criticism to the drab colors and repeated character blocks, concluding “a great blend of action and adventure which captures the spirit of the TV show well and provides a brill game into the bargain.”

GamePro rated the game 25/25, stating that "the engaging gameplay and the downright sharp display make you forget the stiff sashaying."
