= Ultra Games =

Video game publisher

Ultra Software Corporation
- Type: Shell subsidiary
- Industry: Video games
- Founded: 1988
- Defunct: 1992
- Fate: Merged into parent company
- Successor: Konami (America) Inc.
- Headquarters: Buffalo Grove, IL, USA
- Parent: Konami (America) Inc.

Palcom Software Limited
- Type: Shell subsidiary
- Industry: Video games
- Founded: 1990
- Defunct: 1994
- Fate: Merged to parent company
- Successor: Konami (UK) Ltd.
- Headquarters: Middlesex, England
- Parent: Konami (UK) Ltd.

Ultra Software Corporation was a shell corporation and publishing label created in 1988 as a subsidiary of Konami of America, in an effort to get around Nintendo of America's strict licensing rules in place at the time for the North American market. One of these rules was that a third-party company could only publish up to five games per year for the Nintendo Entertainment System in the US.

Nintendo's licensing was inconvenient for Konami, which had begun releasing more than ten games a year for both the Famicom and its Disk System add-on in Japan. With a greater library than it was allowed to localize, Konami formed the Ultra Games brand to extend its annual library to ten games a year.

== History ==
Ultra's first NES game was Metal Gear. At first, Ultra was dedicated to localizing Konami's pre-existing software from Japan, but later it began publishing works from other companies as well. Some of Konami's most notable games released under the Ultra label include Operation C, Snake's Revenge and the first few Teenage Mutant Ninja Turtles games for the NES and Game Boy. The IBM PC and Commodore 64 conversions of Teenage Mutant Ninja Turtles and Metal Gear were also published under the Ultra branding.

After the North American launch of the Super NES in 1991, Nintendo started relaxing the restriction on the number of games third parties could publish each year. As a result, Ultra Games began losing its purpose and Konami dropped the label in 1992. The last games released by Ultra Games were Ultra Golf and World Circuit Series, both released in March 1992.

In Europe, Konami established the Palcom Software Limited subsidiary for similar purposes. Its library was relatively similar to Ultra's but the company also published games that were not released in North America, notably Road Fighter, Parodius and Crackout. Palcom also released Super NES games that were published in North America by Konami itself. In contrast, some games that were released under the Ultra name in North America, such as Metal Gear and Snake's Revenge, were published under the regular Konami brand in Europe. The European subsidiary lasted longer than Ultra Games, until it was closed down in early 1994.

== Games published ==
All games were developed by Konami, except where noted.

=== Ultra Games ===
==== NES ====
- Metal Gear (June 1988)
- Skate or Die! (December 1988)
- Gyruss (February 1989)
- Q*bert (February 1989)
- Teenage Mutant Ninja Turtles (June 1989)
- Defender of the Crown (July 1989; developed by Beam Software)
- Silent Service (December 1989; developed by Rare)
- Kings of the Beach (January 1990)
- Snake's Revenge (April 1990)
- Mission: Impossible (September 1990)
- RollerGames (September 1990)
- Teenage Mutant Ninja Turtles II: The Arcade Game (December 1990)
- Ski or Die (February 1991)
- Base Wars (June 1991)
- Pirates! (October 1991; developed by Rare)
- Nightshade (January 1992; developed by Beam Software)
- Star Trek: 25th Anniversary (February 1992; developed by Interplay)

==== Game Boy ====
- Motocross Maniacs (January 1990)
- Nemesis (April 1990)
- Teenage Mutant Ninja Turtles: Fall of the Foot Clan (August 1990)
- Quarth (December 1990)
- Operation C (February 1991)
- Blades of Steel (August 1991)
- Star Trek: 25th Anniversary (February 1992; developed by Visual Concepts)
- Ultra Golf (March 1992)
- World Circuit Series (March 1992)

==== IBM PC (DOS) ====
- Teenage Mutant Ninja Turtles (May 1990; developed by Unlimited Software)
- Metal Gear (August 1990; developed by Banana Development)

==== Commodore 64 ====
- Teenage Mutant Ninja Turtles (1990; developed by Unlimited Software)
- Metal Gear (1990; developed by Unlimited Software)

=== Palcom Software ===
==== NES ====
- Skate or Die! (August 1990)
- Teenage Mutant Hero Turtles (August 1990)
- Crackout (1991)
- Defender of the Crown (July 1991; developed by Beam Software)
- Pirates! (October 1991; developed by Rare)
- Ski or Die (October 1991)
- Mission: Impossible (November 1991)
- Monster in My Pocket (1992)
- Parodius (1992)
- Road Fighter (1992)
- Castlevania III: Dracula's Curse (December 1992)
- Formula 1 Sensation (1993)
- Rackets & Rivals (1993)
- Bucky O'Hare (December 1993)

==== Game Boy ====
- Blades of Steel (1991)
- Skate or Die: Bad 'N Rad (1991)
- Probotector (May 1992)
- Parodius (1992)
- Star Trek: 25th Anniversary (1992; developed by Visual Concepts)
- Zen: Intergalactic Ninja (1993)

==== Super NES ====
- Cybernator (April 1993; developed by NCS Corporation)
- Pop'n TwinBee (November 1993)
- Sunset Riders (December 1993)

== See also ==
- Konami
