= Cyber Stadium Series—Base Wars =

1991 baseball–fighting Nintendo game

- Developer: Konami
- Publisher: Ultra Games
- Platform: Nintendo Entertainment System
- Release: May/June 1991
- Genre: Sports
- Modes: Single-player; multiplayer

Cyber Stadium Series—Base Wars is a baseball video game for the Nintendo Entertainment System (NES).

Developed by Konami for the NES, and published by Ultra Games, Cyber Stadium Series—Base Wars was released in May or June 1991 in the United States; the game did not receive a European release. A baseball video game for one or two players, the ROM cartridge features the ability to save games, whether playing either an individual game or the ten-game pennant race.

== Plot and gameplay ==
In a 24th century where baseball team owners are dissatisfied overpaying their players (e.g. US$2.4 billion per year for a lifetime .250 hitter), they have replaced the athletes with armed robots; there are four models of robot to choose from, each optimally suited for specific baseball positions. One of the game's innovations is where upon force plays, the two opposing players fight for possession of the base; another is the ability to upgrade robots' abilities between pennant games. If a team loses three robots in a game (to destruction from incremental damage), they forfeit the game.

== Reception ==
Review scores
Publication	Score
AllGame	2.5/5
Electronic Gaming Monthly	7.75 / 10
Nintendo Power	3.275 / 5
Entertainment Weekly	B-
HonestGamers	3/5

In 1991, across its four 1–5 metrics of "graphics and sound", "play control", "challenge", and "theme and fun", Nintendo Power gave Base Wars an average score of 3.275 (3.6, 3.0, 2.9, and 3.6 respectively). Entertainment Weekly's Bob Strauss rated the game a "B-", primarily penalizing Base Wars for playing too much like a typical baseball video game and not leaning enough into its science-fiction potential. Electronic Gaming Monthly's four reviewers averaged a 7.75/10 rating for the game, positively comparing it to Cyberball and noting its multiplayer mode, variety, and polish. As of February 1992, Funco was offering US$26 (equivalent to $59.65 in 2025) to customers selling a copy of Base Wars.

In December 2003, HonestGamers gave a score of 3/5. In 2004, Game Informer described Base Wars' traditional baseball content as similar to Baseball Stars and R.B.I. Baseball, and while they liked the combat aspect, the game was hindered by poor controls, cameras, and AI; they did opine that, if updated to then-modern standards, a remake would be successful. In 2014, Game Informer placed the "super bizarre, but in all the best ways" game as their number-two weirdest sports game. That same year, Allgame's 2.5/5-star review—penned by Skyler Miller—was lukewarm, dismissing the combat aspect and describing fielding as "nearly impossible due to a screen that scrolls too slowly to keep up with fast-moving balls".
