= F-1 Sensation =

1993 video game

F-1 Sensation Formula 1 Sensation
- Japanese cover art by Hideaki Kodama
- Developer(s): Konami
- Publisher(s): JP: Konami; EU: Palcom
- Composer(s): Tomoya Tomita; Jun Chuma
- Platform(s): NES
- Release: JP: January 29, 1993; EU: 1993; NA: Cancelled
- Genre(s): Racing
- Mode(s): Single-player, multiplayer

F-1 Sensation (エフワン センセーション), released in Europe as Formula 1 Sensation, is a 1993 racing video game by Konami for the Family Computer, and a Formula One licensed product. It is heavily based on their 1988 MSX2+ title, F-1 Spirit 3D Special. It was Konami's final original Famicom game before re-releases.

== Summary ==
F-1 Sensation features championship races and drivers from the 1992 Formula One season, including Ayrton Senna and Andrea Moda Formula's original drivers, Enrico Bertaggia and Alex Caffi.

The game contains 18 tracks (the same 16 from the 1992 season, plus Jerez and Phoenix, respectively the venues of the 1990 Spanish Grand Prix and 1991 United States Grand Prix, as extras), each playable separately in the "Free Run" mode, or one-by-one against the 16 of the 1992 season in the "Grand Prix" mode. In the latter, a one-lap qualification drive must be passed before each race, determining the starting position in the grid, and also serving as a short practice for the upcoming course.

In both, player drivers and rival drivers can be freely selected. Each driver in the game is divided into three levels based on real-life skill: A, B, and C. Because there are less entries than there are racers, these choices directly affect the game's difficulty.

Pit stops are included, and a team-radio imitation tells the player when to go to the pits for tires, wing and engine repair. Weather forecasts are available before every racing session. However, in rare cases the weather can change during the race, forcing players to make an unscheduled change of tires.

Each race has five laps, allowing for an arcade-like experience. Colliding (even sharply) with the opponents' cars heavily damages the opponent and slightly decreases the player's own stats. This encourages a brawl-like style of racing not unlike F-Zero, forcing the entire set of competitors out of the race and taking the sole stand on the podium.

Real world sponsors are placed on the billboards that are in the background of each race course; including Shell, Nestlé, Sasol, and Agip. The car may be customized: the player selects the body type of the car, color, at the start of the game; and later also other intrinsic parts.

The game's soundtrack is quoted to sound similar to other Konami FC/NES products such as Blades of Steel and Teenage Mutant Ninja Turtles, chiefly because of the same tools used in the creation process.

The game can be completed in one relatively short sitting, or using password and battery-backed save support like in the original 3D Special. Passwords consists of both small and capital Latin letters, with some additional characters uncommon to NES games.

The only known differences between the Japanese and European releases are the title of the game and the locations of the screen where lap and position information are displayed.
