= Motocross Maniacs 2 =

1999 video game

- Developer: Konami Computer Entertainment
- Publisher: Konami of America
- Platform: Game Boy Color
- Release: NA: 14 September 1999; UK: October 1999
- Genres: Sports; Racing
- Mode: Single-player

Motocross Maniacs 2 (released as Crazy Bikers in Europe) is a 1999 racing game for the Game Boy Color, developed and published by Konami. A sequel to the 1989 Game Boy title Motocross Maniacs, the game is a racing game in which the player drives across a side-scrolling motocross course.

== Gameplay ==
A screenshot depicting the motocross style course.

In Motocross Maniacs 2, players complete one of ten motocross courses using a dirt bike, completing stunts over features such as loops, jumps, ramps and hills. The game has two modes: 'Time Attack' requires a player to complete a course within a set time limit, and 'Championship' requires the player to complete a series of five consecutive races whilst scoring points from stunts to receive the highest ranking. The game also contains a track editor supporting up to three custom courses. Two-player games are supported with the Game Link Cable.

== Reception ==
Reception

Review scores
Publication	Score
AllGame	3.5/5
IGN	8/10
Nintendojo	9.0

Motocross Maniacs 2 received positive reviews, with favorable comparisons to the 1984 Nintendo game Excitebike. Craig Harris of IGN stated the game was "a great game that starts out a little on the boring side, but gets much better with the more complex courses. It's no Excitebike, but it's close." Ty Kris of Nintendojo stated game was "probably the best motocross game available on the Game Boy, praising the game's "killer level editor", and "excellent background music" as "some of the best on the system".
