= Ultra Golf =

1991 Game Boy video game

- North American cover art
- Developer(s): Konami
- Publisher(s): Konami (JP, EU); Ultra Games (NA)
- Platform(s): Game Boy
- Release: JP: November 1, 1991; NA: March 1992; PAL: 1994
- Genre(s): Sports
- Mode(s): Single-player

Ultra Golf, known in Europe as Konami Golf and in Japan as Konamic Golf (コナミックゴルフ), is a golf video game developed by Konami for the Game Boy system. It was released by Konami on November 1, 1991 in Japan, later being released in North America in March 1992, and in the PAL region in 1994.

== Gameplay ==
The game features two courses and a tournament mode, in which a player must win on the first course to play tournaments on the second course. It also has a practice mode which allows the player to play both courses regardless of the tournament status.

== Reception ==
The game received generally positive reviews.

== See also ==
- Konami's Open Golf Championship
- ESPN Final Round Golf 2002
