= Skate or Die: Bad 'N Rad =

1990 video game

- North American box art
- Developer: Konami
- Publishers: NA: Konami; EU: Palcom
- Programmers: Toru Hagihara; Yukari Hayano
- Composer: Hidehiro Funauchi
- Series: Skate or Die
- Platform: Game Boy
- Release: NA: September 1990; EU: June 1991
- Genre: Action
- Mode: Single-player

Skate or Die: Bad 'N Rad is a 2D action video game developed and published by Konami for the Nintendo Game Boy. A part of the Skate or Die series created by Electronic Arts, the game was released in North America in September 1990 and in Europe in June 1991.

== Gameplay ==
A screenshot of the game's first stage, the Roadkill Avenue. The player's health, a score counter and a time limit are displayed at the bottom of the screen.

Skate or Die: Bad 'N Rad is a 2D action game, which contrasts to the original Skate or Die. The player controls an unnamed skateboarder, whose quest is to rescue Miss Aerial from the antagonist, ElRad the Evil One. The game consists of seven stages in total, including the first four stages that are selectable by the player. Each stage is played in one of two perspectives: a side-scrolling "horizontal mode" and a top-down "vertical mode", and has a time limit given to complete it. At the end of a horizontal stage, the player must confront one of the game's bosses, including Wart Monger and Bionic Lester.

During gameplay, the player can move the skateboarder with the Game Boy's directional pad, while A and B buttons are used for jumping and crouching respectively. The skateboarder can also attack enemies by jumping on top of them with his skateboard. The player gains points by collecting aluminum cans and ice creams. At the start of the game, the player is given three lives. An extra life is granted when the score reaches certain thresholds, or when the player obtains a 1-UP item during a stage. One life is lost when the skateboarder's health meter runs out, or if he falls into bottomless pits or traps. The game ends when all lives are lost.

== Development and release ==
Skate or Die: Bad 'N Rad was programmed by Toru Hagihara and Yukari Hayano, and the game's sounds were created by Hidehiro Funauchi and K. Noguchi. The game was released in September 1990, in North America by Konami. The European version was published by Palcom, and was released in June 1991.

== Reception ==
Reception

Review score
Publication	Score
AllGame	2.5/5

In his review for AllGame, Jonathan Sutyak stated that the game can be difficult for players "to react quickly enough when something appears on the screen" due to its speed. Sutyak also praised the game's graphics, although he found it difficult to tell between what the player is skating on and what is the background.
