= ESPN Final Round Golf 2002 =

2001 video game

- Developer: Konami Nagoya
- Publisher: Konami
- Platform: Game Boy Advance
- Release: JP: March 21, 2001; NA: August 28, 2001; EU: October 19, 2001
- Genre: Sports
- Modes: Single player, multiplayer

ESPN Final Round Golf 2002 is a golf video game developed and published by Konami. It was released in North America on August 28, 2001. In Europe it was known as ESPN Final Round Golf. The game is a facelift version of the Japanese GBA title Golf Master: Japan Golf Tour which is identical except for the player list which in the Japanese version consisted mostly of Japanese tour players.

== Reception ==
Reception

Aggregate score
Aggregator	Score
Metacritic	70/100

Review scores
Publication	Score
AllGame	2.5/5
Consoles +	75%
Computer and Video Games	6/10
Electronic Gaming Monthly	8/10
Famitsu	25/40
Game Informer	7/10
GameSpot	6.9/10
IGN	6.5/10
Nintendo Power	3/5

The game received "mixed or average reviews" according to the review aggregation website Metacritic. In Japan, Famitsu gave it a score of 25 out of 40.

== See also ==
- Ultra Golf
- Konami's Open Golf Championship
