= Road Fighter =

1984 video game

- Arcade flyer
- Developer: Konami
- Publishers: WW: Konami; EU: Palcom Software
- Platforms: Arcade, MSX, Famicom/NES
- Release: November 1984: Arcade; NA: November 1984; JP: December 1984; EU: Late 1984 Famicom/NES; JP: July 11, 1985; EU: 1992 MSX; JP: 1985 Mobile; JP: 2005
- Genre: Racing
- Modes: Single-player, multiplayer

Road Fighter (Note: Japanese: ロードファイター, Hepburn: Rōdo Faitā) is a 1984 racing video game developed and published by Konami for arcades. The goal is to reach the finish line within the stages without running out of time, hitting other cars or running out of fuel (which is refilled by hitting a special type of car). The game spawned a spiritual successor, Konami GT (1986), and two sequels, Midnight Run: Road Fighter 2 (1995) and Winding Heat (1996). A Japan-only sequel was also released 14 years later, Road Fighters (2010).

== Gameplay ==
The first two levels contain four courses, ranging from grassy plains and an over-water bridge to a seashore, mountains, and finally a forest area. In the arcade version, six stages were contained. The player controls a red Chevrolet Corvette. Pressing B accelerates the car to around 224 km/h, while pressing A increases its speed to 400 km/h. The player has a limited amount of fuel, equivalent to about 100 seconds of driving and can earn more by touching special multi-colored cars. If the player collides into any other car or slips on occasionally appearing patches of oil, the car will spin out and if not corrected, may crash into the side barriers, causing a loss of five to six fuel points. The NES and Famicom versions have a total of six types of cars: one yellow, one red, three blue, and one truck. Yellow cars travel along a straight line and occur in large numbers. Red cars are less likely to appear, but they will change the lane they are travelling in once to get in the way of the player. Blue cars are the game's main "enemies"; they vary in the way they change lanes and attempt to hit the player. Trucks travel in a straight line, but colliding with them instantly destroys the player's car. Konami Man appears at the side of the road if the player reaches a certain point without crashing (not included on course two in NES and Famicom versions).

== Ports ==
The game was later released for the MSX home computer system in 1985 and the Nintendo Entertainment System in Japan the same year and in Europe in 1992, and followed the same format as the original. The game was included on Konami Arcade Classics in 1999 and on Konami Classics Series: Arcade Hits for the Nintendo DS. The arcade game was released for i-mode phones in Japan in 2005.

Road Fighter was made available on Microsoft Studios' Game Room service for the Xbox 360 and Windows on March 24, 2010. Hamster Corporation released the game as part of their Arcade Archives series for the Nintendo Switch and PlayStation 4 in 2019.

== Reception ==
Initial reviews (NES)

Review scores
Publication	Score
Mean Machines	9%
Total!	44%

In Japan, Game Machine listed Road Fighter on their January 1, 1985 issue as being the most-successful table arcade unit of the month.

In Europe, Computer Gamer magazine reported in 1985 that the "Street Fighter game" was a commercial success in arcades.

== Legacy ==
=== Midnight Run: Road Fighter 2 ===
Midnight Run: Road Fighter 2
- Developer: Konami
- Publisher: Konami Japan
- Platforms: Arcade, PlayStation
- Release: March 1996
- Genre: Racing

Midnight Run: Road Fighter 2 is the sequel to Road Fighter, released in arcades in March 1996, and on the PlayStation in 1997. While the arcade version was released worldwide, the PlayStation version was only released in Japan and Europe. In Europe, the PlayStation version is just titled Midnight Run, removing the Road Fighter connection. Its main selling point was that it allows the player to shift back and forth between manual and automatic transmission during races. Although different from the 2-D Road Fighter, the scenery is similar to other racing games set in Japan such as Initial D Arcade Stage and Wangan Midnight, except the cars are not licensed. The player also has a unique selection of normal cars and tuned cars.

==== Car list ====
- Honda NSX
- Toyota Supra
- Mazda RX-7
- Nissan Skyline GT-R
- Porsche 911 (non-playable)
- Mercedes-Benz SL500 (non-playable)

==== Reception ====
Reviewing the arcade version, Next Generation praised the support for up to four players, challenging AI, multiple tracks, ability to switch between manual and automatic mid-race, tight controls, powerslides, car selection, and generally fast-paced racing, but nonetheless concluded the game to be only slightly above average, and scored it three out of five stars.

=== Winding Heat ===
Winding Heat
- Developer: Konami
- Publisher: Konami
- Composer: Mutsuhiko Izumi
- Platform: Arcade
- Release: September 1996
- Genre: Racing
- Modes: Single-player, multiplayer

Winding Heat is the sequel to Road Fighter and Midnight Run, released in arcades in 1996. It first appeared in arcades in September, though most arcades did not receive their units until later. It is an improved version of Midnight Run: Road Fighter 2, though it has more of the normal or tuned cars, and the rules remain the same. Unlike Midnight Run, it takes place on touge roads.

The cabinet came in two configurations: a sitdown version with a 50-inch monitor and an upright version with a 25-inch monitor. Cabinets can be linked to support up to four players.

=== Winding Heat – Amusement Arcade UK history ===
- Butlins (1999)
- Trecco Bay (1999–2005)

=== Road Fighters (2010) ===
Road Fighters
- Developer: Konami
- Publisher: Konami
- Platform: Arcade
- Release: JP: September 22, 2010
- Genre: Racing

Road Fighters is the Japan-only sequel to the original Road Fighter, released in arcades in 2010. The game features 3D-enhanced graphics, with a mounted pair of goggles used to view the effect. Tracks are set in real-life locations and are all based on race courses from previous Konami racing titles, including Enthusia Professional Racing and the GTI Club series. The game includes numerous licensed vehicles, which can be saved using Konami's e-AMUSEMENT Pass containing tuning and customization data. This game is Konami's answer to Sega's Initial D Arcade Stage 4 and Namco's Wangan Midnight Maximum Tune in terms of card-based games, or Taito's Chase H.Q. 2 in terms of sequels.

Its opening theme "Take Me Higher" was composed (together with the system music) by Sota Fujimori and it was included on beatmania IIDX 18 Resort Anthem as a playable song. In addition, the game includes music from beatmania IIDX and Dance Dance Revolution series, as a form to promote another Konami arcade games.
