= Ski or Die =

1990 winter sport video game

- Developers: Electronic Arts; Konami (NES)
- Publishers: Electronic Arts; Ultra Games (NES); Palcom Software (NES)
- Composer: Rob Hubbard
- Series: Skate or Die
- Platforms: Amiga, NES, MS-DOS, Commodore 64
- Release: 1990
- Genres: Skiing, winter sports
- Modes: Single-player, multiplayer

Ski or Die is a 1990 winter sports game by Electronic Arts for the Amiga, NES, MS-DOS, and Commodore 64. It consists of five minigames which can be played individually or in a set sequentially. Up to six players can compete against each other via hotseat in four of the minigames, and semi-hotseat in one of them (up to two players at a time). The minigames are halfpipe-snowboarding, inflatable sled racing, aerial skiing, downhill skiing, and snowball fights. The shopkeeper was represented by Rodney Dangerfield.

The MS-DOS port supports Roland MT-32 and AdLib audio.

== Gameplay ==
PC and NES versions of Snowboard Halfpipe event.

== Reception ==
Reception

Review score
Publication	Score
GamePro	NES: 17/25

== See also ==
- Skate or Die!
