= Star Trek: 25th Anniversary (NES video game) =

1992 adventure video game

- Developer: Interplay
- Publisher: Ultra Games
- Producer: Michael Quarles
- Designer: Wesley Yanagi
- Composer: Scott La Rocca
- Platform: Nintendo Entertainment System
- Release: NA: February 1992
- Genre: Adventure
- Mode: Single player

Star Trek: 25th Anniversary is a 1992 adventure video game developed by Interplay and published by Ultra Games for the Nintendo Entertainment System. A different version was made with the same name (not a port) on the Game Boy.

== Synopsis ==
Thumb

The game begins as the USS Enterprise is approaching the planet Sigma Iotia II. The ship is caught up in a tear in space-time that sends them to an unknown area of space. While attempting to escape the tear, the dilithium crystals that are needed to travel at warp speed become fused and are rendered useless. The Enterprise crew finds that it is trapped in a decaying orbit above an unknown planet. Spock detects small amounts of dilithium crystals on the planet. Kirk leads an away team to secure the crystals and keep the Enterprise from burning up as the orbit decays. After navigating a deadly bog, braving the bloodworms, and figuring out the riddle at the obelisk, Kirk and his away team find some low-grade dilithium that will get the Enterprise part of the way back. The Enterprise crew is forced to make several more stop-offs for dilithium before getting back to Sigma Iotia II to figure out what caused the tear in space-time, and find a way to fix it.

== Gameplay ==
Kirk leads an away team consisting of the player's choice of two crew members including but not limited to McCoy, Spock, and even red shirts down to a planet, each one constitutes a level. The gameplay becomes graphic adventure game-styled. Most of the time, progress in the game requires the player to interact with various life forms on a world, find objects, and solve puzzles. While each character is equipped with a phaser, violence rarely is the ideal solution to any puzzle.

In one level where the player steps on symbols on the ground to advance, the symbols from the back of Led Zeppelin IV are seen.

== Reception ==
The American video gaming magazine Nintendo Power reviewed Star Trek: 25th Anniversary and assigned it an overall rating of 4 out of 5 in their October 1991 issue.
