= Star Trek: 25th Anniversary (Game Boy video game) =

1992 Game Boy video game

- European cover art
- Developer(s): Visual Concepts
- Publisher(s): Ultra
- Designer(s): Carry Hammer; Bill Stanton
- Programmer(s): Cary Hammer
- Platform(s): Game Boy
- Release: NA: February 1992; EU: 1992
- Genre(s): Action
- Mode(s): Single player

Star Trek: 25th Anniversary is a 1992 Game Boy video game developed by Visual Concepts and published by Ultra, based upon the Star Trek universe. The game chronicles a mission of James T. Kirk and his crew of the USS Enterprise. Despite having the same name, the Game Boy version is not a port of the NES game or computer versions, and is in fact a completely different game. It was succeeded by Star Trek: The Next Generation for Game Boy, developed and published by Absolute Entertainment the following year.

== Plot ==
Captain Kirk has to confront two mutant enemies while on a strange planet.

The Game Boy version starts with Captain Kirk receiving a message from Admiral McQuilkin at Starfleet Base 4, alerting him that the Klingons have stolen a piece of technology needed to stop a force from annihilating countless planets. The player must locate the 12 fragments of the device scattered across three different worlds.

== Gameplay ==
=== Space Travel ===
These levels of the game take the form of a shoot 'em up. From the map, the player can move the Enterprise to different levels, including:

- Asteroid fields, where the player must avoid asteroids, as well as the gravitational pull of the planets
- Klingon Warships, which are asteroid fields that also include Klingons firing on the player
- Romulan Warships, which can use their cloaking devices to avoid the player's fire
- Tholian Warships, in which the player must also evade the Tholian Webs
- Space Amoebas, in which the player moves at a slower speed.

The player uses the ship icon at the bottom of the screen to track progress through the levels. The player has two weapons available while in ship mode: phasers and photon torpedoes. In the power menu the player may choose to divert power to or from speed, shields, or phasers. The Enterprise must defeat many enemy ships and hit warps and collect energy to advance, while avoiding asteroids and enemy fire, as well as the gravitational pull of planets.

=== Away Missions ===
At the end of each map is a planet that contains the parts of the Disruptor. Kirk, Spock, and Bones beam down to find the parts. Here, the game takes the form of an adventure game, with the player taking control of Kirk. As Kirk, the player uses a tricorder to find the Disruptor parts and identify various obstacles. Occasionally, Spock or Bones will call Kirk on his communicator to offer help. The only weapon Kirk has is a phaser, which he can use to stun enemies or destroy obstacles. Once all four weapons parts have been located, the team beams back up to the ship.

After completing three maps and three away missions, the player takes on the Doomsday Machine.

=== Doomsday Machine ===
Before the final boss, a Red Alert flashes on the screen, warning that the Doomsday Machine is dead ahead. In the last level the player must advance the Enterprise past other destroyed Federation starships and asteroids while dodging starship-sized fire balls coming from the Doomsday Machine. The player then must destroy the machine in progressively smaller segments while continuing to avoid fire balls. When the game is beaten, the player receives a final message from Admiral McQuilkin at Starfleet Base 4: "Congratulations, Kirk. You've destroyed the planet-killer, and saved the galaxy. The Federation owes you its thanks."

== Reception ==
Allgame gave this video a rating of 2.5 stars out of 5. In the June 1992 issue of N-Force, the game was evaluated with a rating of 46% (the equivalent of an "F" letter grade).
