= Konami GT =

1985 video game

- North American arcade flyer
- Developer: Konami
- Publishers: WW: Konami; JP: Namco
- Platform: Arcade
- Release: JP: October 1985; WW: May 1986
- Genre: Racing
- Mode: Single-player

Konami GT, released in Japan as Konami RF2 Red Fighter, is a 1985 racing video game developed and published by Konami for arcades. Namco released the game in Japan. The player drives a sports car which must reach various checkpoints without running out of fuel. A turbo mode (activated by the gear shift) increases the car's speed but uses more fuel and puts the player at a higher risk of hitting an obstacle. Fuel power-ups can be found on the road which the player must pick up to make it to the final checkpoint.

The original title RF2 is a reference to Konami's 1984 arcade game Road Fighter, and thus this may be considered an unofficial sequel. RF2 was a commercial success in Japanese arcades. The series was followed in 1996 by Midnight Run - Road Fighter 2.

Konami GT was made available on Microsoft's Game Room service in 2010. Hamster Corporation released the game as part of their Arcade Archives series for the Nintendo Switch and PlayStation 4, as well as their Arcade Archives 2 series for the Nintendo Switch 2, PlayStation 5 and Xbox Series X/S in April 2026.

== Reception ==
In Japan, Game Machine listed Konami GT on their November 15, 1985 issue as being the sixth most-successful upright/cockpit arcade cabinet of the month. It went on to be Japan's fifth highest-grossing upright/cockpit arcade game during the first half of 1986, and the overall eighth highest-grossing arcade game of 1986.

Mike Roberts of Computer Gamer magazine reviewed "Road Fighter II from Konami" following its appearance at London's Preview '86 show in late 1985, calling it "a fantastic sequel to the Road Fighter game". He said it was "a three dimensional racing game in the style of" Pole Position (1982) "but the quality of graphics and gameplay are in excess of anything that I have seen for a long time".

In-game screenshot
