= ESPN Extreme Games =

1995 video game

- Developer: Sony Interactive Studios America
- Publishers: Sony Computer Entertainment; Sony Interactive PC Software America (Note: Released under the Sony Imagesoft brand name.)(DOS only)
- Programmers: Mark Lyons; Bob Gordon
- Artist: Joe Brisbois
- Platforms: PlayStation, MS-DOS
- Release: PlayStation: NA: September 9, 1995; EU: December 15, 1995; JP: May 24, 1996; MS-DOS: NA: February 27, 1996; EU: 1996
- Genre: Racing
- Modes: Single-player, multiplayer

ESPN Extreme Games (released in Japan as ESPN Street Games) is a game released for the PlayStation in 1995. A version was released for MS-DOS a short time later. The game featured all the sports included in the Summer X-Games of 1995, but it did not feature events such as the half pipe in skateboarding. It was similar to Road Rash, which was a game published by Electronic Arts. The game was followed by two sequels, 2Xtreme and 3Xtreme.

Like other titles released during the console's early life, the game was available in a large CD jewel case, like the ones used for the Sega CD and Sega Saturn games.

The game was subsequently re-released under the title of 1Xtreme (as a way of indicating it's a predecessor to 2Xtreme) under the Greatest Hits line, as the ESPN license had expired. The ESPN logo and company name were removed from its title, and game content referring to ESPN was removed as well.

== Gameplay ==
The game featured many different sports, including skateboarding, roller blading, street luge and mountain biking. The tracks start at one end of a city, and progress along a linear path to another point of the city. Players kick and punch opponents while trying to obtain cash, attaining first place. The tracks are located in various parts of the world (i.e. including Tahoe and San Francisco).

Video clips of broadcaster Suzy Kolber are displayed after each race, in which she offers words of encouragement or pointed criticism of your performance.

== Reception ==
Roughly a year after the game's release, Electronic Gaming Monthly reported that ESPN Extreme Games was the biggest selling Sony-published PlayStation game worldwide.

Reviewing the PlayStation version, Air Hendrix of GamePro said ESPN Extreme Games "doesn't push the limits of 32-bit graphics and gameplay, but it does take you on a thrilling ride." He elaborated that the game suffers from "rocky" scrolling and overly pixelated graphics and has few tracks compared to the similar Road Rash, but that details in the graphics "keep the action realistic" and the racing is sufficiently intense. Maximum gave it four out of five stars, remarking that "being able to kick the stuffing out of anyone who dares to try and pass you (especially those racing bikes) makes it a wholly fulfilling experience." They also praised the texture mapping and graphical details, though they criticized the small number of tracks and said the game does not measure up to Ridge Racer or Wipeout, both already released on the PlayStation. A brief review in Next Generation said it was "not bad" and scored it three out of five stars. Computer Game Review described the computer port as a "good conversion from the Sony PlayStation that's worth checking out."

== See also ==
- 2Xtreme
- 3Xtreme
