= La femme qui ne supportait pas les ordinateurs =

1986 video game

- Developer(s): Froggy Software
- Publisher(s): Froggy Software
- Designer(s): Chine Lanzmann
- Programmer(s): Jean-Louis Le Breton
- Platform(s): Apple II
- Release: 1986
- Genre(s): interactive fiction

La femme qui ne supportait pas les ordinateurs (The woman who could not stand computers) is a 1986 interactive fiction video game developed by French company Froggy Software. The game was designed by Chine Lanzmann and programmed by Jean-Louis Le Breton for Apple II computers. The player character is a woman who faces several seducers, one of them being a computer named Ordine, who ruthlessly usurps the right to be the only woman's love.

The game takes place on the Calvados network, the network used by the two authors of the game at the time. It imitates its interface and services (for example, messages between users, global chat room, AFP dispatches), as if the player's computer were connected to it. One also meets, in a general chat room, the pseudonyms of the network's users at the time (for example, "Lumbroglio" for Lionel Lumbroso, "Chine" for Chine Lanzmann, "Pepe Louis" for the founder of Froggy Software Jean-Louis Le Breton, "Benv" for François Benveniste).

== Legacy ==
The game received a negative review from Tilt on its release.

La femme qui ne supportait pas les ordinateurs is regarded as one of the first video games about cyber harassment and female experience online, and one of the first games with an overtly feminist message.
