= 3Xtreme =

1999 video game

- Developer: 989 Sports
- Publisher: 989 Sports
- Producer: Joe Brisbois
- Designers: Joe Brisbois; Bob Gordon
- Programmers: Bob Gordon; Paul Rubio
- Composer: Chuck Doud
- Series: Extreme Games
- Platform: PlayStation
- Release: NA: April 20, 1999
- Genre: Racing
- Modes: Single-player, multiplayer

3Xtreme is a 1999 combat racing video game developed and published by 989 Sports for the PlayStation. As with 2Xtreme, 3Xtreme contains skateboarding, skating, and cycling options to reach the goal before opponents, with the optional ability for offensive physical attacks.

== Gameplay ==
In 3Xtreme, the players take part in specific events using skateboards, BMX or inline skates. With the simplistic nature of each stage, the focus is on doing tricks instead of pure driving. There are more than 22 courses, mostly taken from 2Xtreme. They include parks, subways, mountains and islands. Each trick, for which Dave Mirra and Andy MacDonald did motion-capture, can be linked into combos. Some of them are rail slides, board grabs and 360 degree turns. 3Xtreme rewards doing trick moves as good as possible by giving points, judging by how well they were performed. They can be used afterwards to upgrade the vehicles. The game contains several modes: exhibition (is used to prepare for the race against the opponents), freestyle (competition in who gets the most trick points), and season (playing through three circuits which unlocks some equipment and extra tracks).

== Development ==
3Xtreme was developed by 989 Sports, with Ed Loonam as the product manager. The idea was to incorporate the speed pace from ESPN Extreme Games, while keeping some fighting elements from 2Xtreme. Unlike the previous games in the series which used sprites, every in-game object was fully polygonal and all tracks were designed to be longer. The vehicles were based on real-life models from several manufacturers, such as Trek Bicycle Corporation, K2 Sports, GT Bicycles and Tum Yeto.

Sony spent millions of dollars marketing the game.

== Reception ==
Reception

Aggregate score
Aggregator	Score
GameRankings	40%

Review scores
Publication	Score
AllGame	2/5
CNET Gamecenter	2/10
Electronic Gaming Monthly	2.25/10 (Note: In Electronic Gaming Monthly's review of the game, one critic gave it a score of 4/10, another gave it 3/10, and the rest gave it each a score of 1/10.)
GameFan	53% (Note: In GameFan's viewpoint of the game, one critic gave it a score of 51, and the other 54.)
GamePro	4/5 (Note: GamePro gave the game three 4/5 scores for graphics, sound, and fun factor, and 3.5/5 for control.)
GameSpot	2.7/10
IGN	3/10
Next Generation	1/5
Official U.S. PlayStation Magazine	1/5
PlayStation: The Official Magazine	2/5

The game received unfavorable reviews according to the review aggregation website GameRankings. Next Generation said that the game was "yet another formula 'don't do much for the sequel, because they're gonna buy it anyway' production."
