= Crackout (video game) =

1986 video game

- European cover art
- Developer: Konami
- Publishers: JP: Konami; EU: Palcom
- Designer: Yoshiharu Kambe
- Composers: Hidenori Maezawa; Jun Funahashi; Hiroshi Takeyasu
- Platforms: Family Computer Disk System, Nintendo Entertainment System
- Release: Family Computer Disk System: JP: December 13, 1986; Nintendo Entertainment System: EU: 1991; AU: 1991
- Genre: Breakout clone
- Mode: Single-player

Crackout (Note: Japanese: 謎の壁 ブロックくずし, Hepburn: Nazo no Kabe: Block-kuzushi; lit. Block Break: The Mysterious Wall) is a video game by Konami that was released in Japan for the Family Computer Disk System on December 13, 1986, and in Europe and Australia for the Nintendo Entertainment System in 1991. It is a Breakout clone, with some additional elements not normally found in other games in the genre.

== Gameplay ==

The object of the game is to clear levels by either destroying all bricks or defeating the enemies.

There are four zones of eleven levels each. The zones are Cubic Zone, Mirror Zone, Tube Zone and Final Zone. This game differs from the original Breakout as it contained enemies on screen that could be hit to gain power ups. Powerups included a parachute to slow the ball down, multiple balls, or projectiles. There were also level warps in the form of Konami Man, who would fly from top to bottom of the play area. There were typically one to three enemies on screen at once, appearing out of a trapdoor in the top corners, or let in through the side walls. Every few levels there was also a boss, ranging from a small dragon to a centipede. The bosses changed colour from Green to Blue to Pink, each time increasing in speed. Each level also contained a hidden letter which made up a password presented at the end of the game (Zone 4 Level 11).

If this was not input correctly, the player restarted the game from the beginning. If the player input the password correctly, they were shown the end credits which consisted of a procession of the enemies from the game. The password is MERRYCHRISTMAS.

== Release and reception ==
Reception

Review score
Publication	Score
Famitsu	8/10, 9/10, 9/10, 9/10 (FDS)

Crackout was released in Japan on December 13, 1989 as Nazo no Kabe: Block-kuzushi.

Two reviewers responded to comments that the game was unoriginal, such as being similar to Arkanoid. All four reviewers responded to how fun it was overall, with one saying it had the style they had come to expect from Konami.
