= 2Xtreme =

1996 video game

- Developer: Sony Interactive Studios America
- Publisher: Sony Computer Entertainment
- Producer: Kelly Ryan
- Programmers: Phillip Weeks; Bob Gordon; Michael Riccio
- Composer: Rex Baca
- Platform: PlayStation
- Release: NA: November 8, 1996; EU: March 6, 1997
- Genre: Racing
- Modes: Single-player, multiplayer

2Xtreme (released as Street Games '97 in Japan) is a racing video game developed by Sony Interactive Studios America and published by Sony Computer Entertainment for the PlayStation. It is a sequel to ESPN Extreme Games and unlike its predecessor, the game does not bear ESPN licensing. In it, the player races against others in various events around the world using Rollerblading, skateboarding, biking, and snowboarding. A sequel, 3Xtreme, was released in 1999.

== Gameplay ==
Players compete on 12 courses with different vehicles. Points are awarded for performing tricks, passing through special gates, and knocking down opponents. Health dictates how easily a player can be knocked over by an obstacle or another racer, and decreases when a player accelerates. 2Xtreme has four different difficulty levels. A player can choose in the options to race without the other computer characters, and also turn off fighting.

On 2Xtreme a player can either do a normal 'Exhibition' race or a season which involves all 12 tracks and creates standings based on the score the player achieves in each track. The score is calculated mainly by the time the player finishes in and place in the race. Points from gates, knockdowns and tricks are then added to this. On 2-player mode both for Exhibitions and Seasons the screen is split horizontally and both players start at the back of the race. This makes the game a little more difficult as it becomes harder to see and avoid the obstacles in your path.

== Reception ==
Reception

Aggregate score
Aggregator	Score
GameRankings	72.20% (5 reviews)

Review scores
Publication	Score
Electronic Gaming Monthly	6.5/10
GameSpot	7.6/10
Next Generation	2/5

2Xtreme sharply divided critics. GamePro's Dr. Zombie praised the game for its "high-speed action", tough opponent AI, split screen competitive mode, responsive controls, and graphics, particularly the rendered backgrounds. In contrast, Hugh Sterbakov of GameSpot said that though the graphics, sounds, and gameplay were all improved from ESPN Extreme Games, they were still so primitive that they could have been done on a last generation console. However, he felt the fun gameplay in two-player mode outweighed this, though he recommended that gamers with no one to play with buy a different racing game. Todd Mowatt of Electronic Gaming Monthly gave it an 8 out of 10, citing the power-ups, selection of characters, and season competition, while his co-reviewer Joe Rybicki gave it a 5 out of 10, saying the graphics and animation do not exploit the PlayStation's capabilities, and the gameplay fails to improve upon the unexciting original. A reviewer for Next Generation somewhat similarly commented that 2Xtreme "seems to be a little more sedate than the frenzied original was." He noted the absence of aggressive civilians, the lack of differentiation between the three tracks, and the over-similar control and feel of the different sports. He also criticized the two-player split screen as "barely adequate", and said the game should have supported the PlayStation Link Cable. Albuquerque Journal gave the game a 4+ rating.

== See also ==
- ESPN Extreme Games
- 3Xtreme
