= Skate or Die 2: The Search for Double Trouble =

1990 video game

- Cover art by James C. Blair
- Developer: Electronic Arts
- Publisher: Electronic Arts
- Producer: Don Traeger
- Designers: Michael Kosaka; Eric Knopp; David Bunch
- Programmers: Eric Knopp; David Bunch; Carl Mey; Thomas DeBry
- Composer: Rob Hubbard
- Series: Skate or Die
- Platform: NES
- Release: September 1990
- Genre: Adventure/Skateboarding
- Mode: Single-player

Skate or Die 2: The Search for Double Trouble is a skateboarding themed action/adventure video game for the Nintendo Entertainment System. The game is a sequel to Skate or Die!.

The skater seen on the cover art is Jef Whitehead, who would years later become known for being the sole member of the black metal project Leviathan.

== Characters ==
The Hero: The unnamed hero of the adventure is a male skateboarder. At the start of the game, the player is armed with a paintball gun and a handful of weapons to throw at his enemies.

CJ: The hero's girlfriend.

Rodney: One of the characters from the original Skate or Die! He sells the player new and better skateboards.

Lester: Rodney's son, he will teach the player new tricks in exchange for some of the goodies collected along the way (and if the player can catch him).

Icepick: A thug who is the main villain of the game.

== Gameplay ==
Skate or Die 2 is a side scrolling game, though the player can return to previously visited areas. The hero has a variety of skateboarding moves and weapons at his disposal, the controls for which can be programmed by the player. The hero's primary weapon is his paintball gun, though he can also throw eggs and firecrackers at his opponents. The game also has a bartering system. During the journey the hero can pick up CDs, cassette tapes, French fries, and tacos. These items can be traded with Rodney and Lester for new tricks and skateboards.

There are also a total of five skateboards in the game. The one the player starts with is slow and does not jump very high, but by meeting up with Rodney the hero can acquire two progressively faster and higher-jumping skateboards, with each one replacing the hero's current board. Later in the game Rodney can sell the player two boards that do not replace the current board. One is fast but has poor jumping abilities, while the other jumps high but is slow, but if the player does not acquire the boards on the first level, then Rodney will not appear in the third. This held true with Lester, as well: the player would have to buy the three moves he offered in stage one for him to appear in stage three.

Rather than make the player complete the story portion of the game in order to unlock the Double Trouble halfpipe, the game offers the player the option to skip the story and play the ramp as a standalone portion of the game by pressing "Select". The option is displayed on the title screen, as well as described in the instruction manual.

== Plot ==
The game opens with a cutscene that places the story in a fictional town called Elwood. While out for a skateboard ride, the unnamed hero is distracted by Icepick. This causes the hero to run over the mayor's wife's poodle. In retaliation, she has her husband ban skateboarding. Somehow, the solution to this is to meet the mayor's wife in a warehouse and assault her with a paintball gun.

Stage one takes place on the streets of Elwood. The player can meet up with Rodney and Lester to acquire new tricks and two new skateboards. He can also blast other skaters to pick up goodies, paintball clips, and throwing weapons. The stage ends when the player finds and defeats the mayor's wife in a showdown.

The second cut scene shows the aftermath of the showdown. The hero heads to the local half-pipe only to find it being demolished. He is confronted by a construction worker, who informs the hero that since the half-pipe was built without a permit, it must be torn down. When the hero asks what the town's skaters are supposed to do, the construction worker gruffly replies he should get a job so he can buy a building permit "or take up knitting".

Stage two takes place in a shopping mall. The hero has taken a job as a delivery boy to earn money for the new half-pipe. The player has a set amount of time to make each delivery in the two floor mall. If the hero makes his delivery on time, he receives a tip (more weapons or goodies). In addition to the other skaters, the hero has to deal with slow moving shoppers carrying stacks of boxes and a security guard.

After completing his deliveries and getting paid, the hero visits Rodney, who is finishing the blueprints for the new half-pipe. In an unfortunate accident, the hero turns on a fan instead of the lights. The blueprints fly out the window and are scattered over the beach.

This begins stage three. The hero must collect all the pages of the blueprint before they blow off the beach. While making his way past roller skaters, crabs, seagulls, and posing body builders, the hero can meet up with Lester and Rodney again to continue learning new tricks and buy new boards.

Once all the pages of the blueprint are recovered, CJ heads off the city hall with the money the hero earned in stage two. Fate once again conspires against the hero. After buying the building permit CJ is kidnapped by Icepick and his gang.

Stage four takes place in the abandoned warehouse Icepick and his gang call home. Unlike the other stages, the warehouse is a four floor maze of rooms instead of one long screen the player can move back and forth on. After finding the building permit, the hero makes his way to the rooftop where he defeats his nemesis.

With CJ rescued and the building permit found, the hero and his friends are able to build their new half-pipe, Double Trouble. The game ends with the player being able to use the ramp.

== Double Trouble ==
The halfpipe Double Trouble

Double Trouble is a large half-pipe with a smaller spine ramp in the middle. Unlike the half-pipe in the first Skate or Die! game, Double Trouble is two screens instead of one. The player has three minutes to perform his tricks. If he wipes out three times the game is over (although there is a code a player can enter to attain unlimited boards). Should the player go on a scoring streak CJ appears in a window of a house in the background, doubling the number of points the player receives with each trick for a short amount of time.

Once the run is finished, the player sprite would then react to the quality of his run, based upon how many points the player got during the run. The sprite had a number of reactions for each point total range. The worst possible reaction was the man slamming the board on his head (thereby shattering the board into pieces) before saying "No way, dude!" The best reaction (gained after exceeding 30,000 points in a run) would be the sprite doing a balancing act of the board on his finger while yelling "Way cool, dude!"
