= Dingo Pictures =

German animation studio

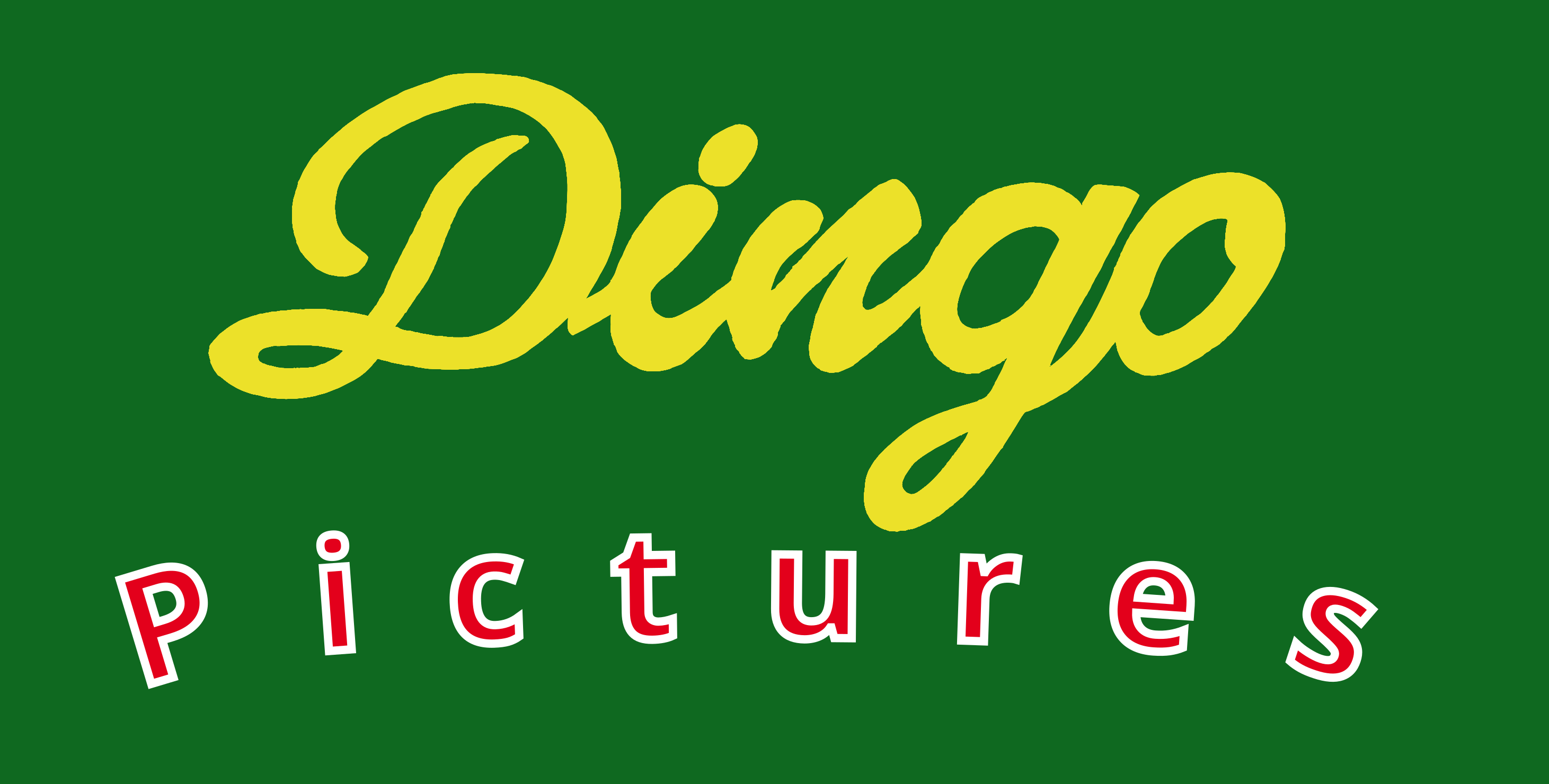
- Industry: Animation
- Founded: 1992; 34 years ago
- Founders: Ludwig Ickert and Roswitha Haas
- Headquarters: Friedrichsdorf, Germany
- Website: www.dingo-pictures.de/

Dingo Productions Haas und Ickert Partnerschaft, Filmemacher (more commonly known as Dingo Pictures) is a German animation company based in Friedrichsdorf. It was founded in 1992 by musician Ludwig Ickert (March 30, 1944 – November 14, 2019) and book author Roswitha Haas (January 28, 1940 – December 8, 2015) under the name of Media Concept. The studio became known when its animated films were released on video game consoles by Phoenix Games and Midas Games in the early 2000s.

== History ==
In the 1980s, Ludwig Ickert, who became known in the 1960s as the lead guitarist in the blues rock band Royal Teens (later renamed The Rangers, The Trembles, and Royal Oldies), founded the company Super-Sound-Video-Einzelhandels GmbH in Rosbach vor der Höhe. The company went bankrupt in March 1985, but reopened as LUI.TV on July 24, 1986.

In 1992, Ickert founded Media Concept together with his wife Roswitha Haas, who later wrote various children's books. The studio was located in Ickert and Haas' house in the Dillingen district of Friedrichsdorf. They produced their first animated films for LUI.TV, Griechische Sagen: Perseus and Die Nibelungen Sage: Siegfried; Haas wrote the films' scripts while Ickert did the character designs and animation. The studio also produced "storybook" films. The production of Media Concept's animated films involved recording the hand-painted backgrounds and syncing the animation (produced with Deluxe Paint for the Amiga) to the camera. Following lawsuits filed against Filmation and GoodTimes Entertainment by The Walt Disney Company for copyright infringement, the studio was inspired to produce and release their first mockbuster film, Aladin. Media Concept's films were based on fairy tales and concepts similar to those used for films by companies including Disney, Pixar, Don Bluth Productions and DreamWorks Animation. In addition to the low-budget animation, the films used small voice casts and stock music (from Killer Tracks and Bluevalley), and had character designs plagiarized from characters in Disney and Don Bluth Productions' films. The studio's crew mostly consisted of their family and friends, celebrities, and local theater actors working at Die Dramatische Bühne, including Simone Greiss, Armin Drogat, Raija Siikavirta, Thorsten Morawietz, Can Oral, Rainer Maria Ehrhardt, Georg Feils, and Viola Seiffe. In 1996, the company was officially registered as "Dingo Productions". Die kleine Hexe Arischa was the studio's final film before they closed in 2006, having more advanced digital effects and music tracks than in their earlier films.

The films were released direct-to-video in Germany by the companies Jünger in 1992–1999, Best Buy Movie in 2000–2001, and Best Entertainment in 2001–2005. They were also dubbed into other languages, notably Swedish and Italian. In the early 2000s, some of Dingo's films were released on the PlayStation and PlayStation 2 by European game publishers Phoenix Games and Midas Interactive. These releases were developed by The Code Monkeys and included the film, as well as a small collection of minigames.

Since 2012, Dingo Pictures has gained popularity through reviews of their films on YouTube and Internet memes. An edited clip from the Italian dub of Abenteuer im Land der Dinosaurier became a meme called "Yee", due to a scene in which Oro, the dinosaur teacher, scolds Piek for mocking Tio, the protagonist, pronouncing his name in a way that sounds like Yee.

In 2017, Ipswich-based company Edutain4Kids released five ebook adaptations of Dingo Pictures' films. Following the deaths of Haas on December 8, 2015 and Ickert on November 14, 2019, their relatives inherited the studio and its equipment. On May 26, 2021, independent label Vier Sterne Deluxe Records announced that it was negotiating with the current owners of Dingo to release the films as radio plays. Musician Simon Bohnsack and the new CEO, Josef "Jimmy" Roederer, also had plans to make new films, and successfully raised funds for a documentary behind the studio, named YEE!: Behind the Meme of DINGO PICTURES. The radio plays were released between August 2021 and December 2022, beginning with Wabuu der freche Waschbär. In September 2024, the relatives donated the studio's equipment, backgrounds, storage devices and documents to the Deutsches Institut für Animationsfilm. In April 2026, Bohnsack announced that he stepped back from the documentary, due to creative differences with Roederer during production.

== Reception ==
In 2021, Amelia Tait of The Guardian wrote an article about mockbusters, in which she called Dingo Pictures' films "the world's most infamous mockbusters", describing their animation as "childish". Nicolas Freund of the Süddeutsche Zeitung wrote that the films looked "as if they had been drawn listlessly with felt-tip pens". He also described the films as "short, confusing, full of logical errors, and [having] none of the magic of the elaborate cinema films".

== Filmography ==
Year	German	English	Notes	Director
1992	Griechische Sagen: Perseus	Greek Tales: Perseus		Ludwig Ickert and Roswitha Haas
1992	Die Nibelungen Sage: Siegfried	The Nibelungen Sage: Siegfried		Roswitha Haas
1993	Die Schönsten Geschichten Vom Osterhasen	The Most Beautiful Stories From The Easter Bunny		Roswitha Haas
1993	Aladin		Also known as Alladin	Roswitha Haas
1993	Lustige Weihnachten: Max’ wundersames Geschenk	Merry Christmas: Max's Miraculous Gift		Roswitha Haas
1994	Neue Geschichten vom Osterhasen	New Stories from the Easter Bunny	Sequel to Die Schönsten Geschichten Vom Osterhasen.	Roswitha Haas
1994	Goldie: Abenteuer im Zauberwald	Goldie: Adventures in the Enchanted Forest		Roswitha Haas
1994	Der König der Tiere	King of the Animals	Also known as The Lion and the King	Roswitha Haas
1994	Hampie ein kleiner Wal entdeckt seine Welt	Hampie: A Little Whale Discovers His World		Bärbel Ballweber
1995	Es Weihnachtet Sehr...	It's Very Christmassy...	Both the studio's final "storybook film" and final film released under the LUI.TV banner	Roswitha Haas
1995	Artige Katzen	Nice Cats	Also known as Lucy and Lionel	Roswitha Haas
1995	Pocahontas		Also known as Pocahontas - An Indian Story	Roswitha Haas
1995	Die Mäusepolizei	The Mouse Police	Also known as A Case for the Mouse Police	Roswitha Haas
1996	Toys: Das Geburtstagsgeschenk	Toys: The Birthday Present	Remake of Es Weihnachtet Sehr...	Roswitha Haas
1996	Wabuu der freche Waschbär	Wabuu the Cheeky Raccoon		Roswitha Haas
1996	Der Glöckner von Notre Dame	The Hunchback of Notre Dame		Roswitha Haas
1996	Janis das Schweinchenbaby	Janis the Little Pig		Roswitha Haas
1996	Peter und der Wolf	Peter and the Wolf		Roswitha Haas
1997	Der Gestiefelte Kater	Puss in Boots		Roswitha Haas
1997	Auf der Suche nach den Dalmatinern	In Search of the Dalmatians	Also known as simply The Dalmatians and Dalmatians	Roswitha Haas
1997	Balto		Also known as The Adventures of the Brave Husky	Roswitha Haas
1997	Herkules	Hercules	Also known as Hercules - The Son of the Gods	Roswitha Haas
1997	Die Bremer Stadtmusikanten	The Bremen Town Musicians	Also known as The Musicians of Bremen	Roswitha Haas
1998	Anastasia			Roswitha Haas
1998	Das unglaubliche Fußballspiel der Tiere	Animal Soccer World	Also known as The Incredible Football Game of the Animals	Roswitha Haas
1998	Ein Prinz für Ägypten	Prince of Egypt	Also known as Moses - Prince of Egypt	Roswitha Haas
1998	Das Schwert von Camelot	The Sword of Camelot	Also known as Camelot	Roswitha Haas
1999	Der König der Tiere: Das große Abenteuer	The King of the Beasts: The Great Adventure		Roswitha Haas
1999	Tarzan: Der Herr des Dschungels	Tarzan: Lord of the Jungle	Also known as Lord of the Animals	Roswitha Haas
2000	Im Tal der Osterhasen	In the Valley of the Easter Bunnies	Remake of Die Schönsten Geschichten Vom Osterhasen	Roswitha Haas
2000	Winkie der kleine Bär	Winkie the Little Bear	Also known as Countryside Bears	Roswitha Haas
2000	Abenteuer im Land der Dinosaurier	Adventures in the Land of the Dinosaurs	Also known as Dinosaur Adventure	Roswitha Haas
2000	… noch mehr Dalmatiner	... even more Dalmatians	Sequel to Auf der Suche nach den Dalmatinern	Roswitha Haas
2001	Atlantis: Der verlorene Kontinent	Atlantis: The Lost Continent	Also known as Empire of Atlantis	Roswitha Haas
2004	Benni und seine Freunde	Benny and His Friends	Remake of Peter und der Wolf	Roswitha Haas
2005	Die kleine Hexe Arischa	The Little Witch Arischa	The studio's final film.	Roswitha Haas
