= Gekido =

2000 video game

Gekido: Urban Fighters
- European cover art
- Developer: NAPS team
- Publishers: EU: Infogrames; NA: Interplay Entertainment
- Platform: PlayStation
- Release: FRA: May 15, 2000; UK: May 19, 2000; NA: June 2, 2000
- Genres: Beat 'em up, fighting
- Modes: Single-player, multiplayer

Gekido (released as Gekido: Urban Fighters in NA and PAL regions) is a beat 'em up video game for the PlayStation console, created by Italian studio NAPS Team. The game uses a fast-paced beat 'em up system and a 3D side scrolling gameplay, with many bosses and a colorful design in terms of graphics. The game features the music of Fatboy Slim and Apartment 26. Marvel comic book artist Joe Madureira also contributed. Versions of Gekido were also planned for the Game Boy Color and N-Gage but were never released. NAPS team released the prototype of the Game Boy Color game on February 13, 2017.

It was later followed by a GBA sequel called Gekido Advance: Kintaro's Revenge, which was re-released for the Nintendo Switch, PlayStation 4, Xbox One, and Microsoft Windows in 2018. A second sequel, entitled Gekido: The Dark Angel, was cancelled.

== Story ==
In a time when there is great corruption and terror, a young girl named Angela has been kidnapped. Rumor has it that Kintaro has made a deal with the devil. Angela's parents hire Travis, a private detective, to investigate the crime boss Kintaro and retrieve Angela. Knowing that the mission to rescue Angela will not be easy, he is aided by three sidekicks, Michelle, Ushi, and Tetsuo.

== Game modes and gameplay ==
Travis fighting in the Market level

In the game, you defeat enemies using combos and weapons. You also have a Rage Meter which builds up, allowing you to perform special attacks and gain abilities, and a Wipeout Meter which fills up, allowing you to perform a powerful attack.

- Urban Fighters - The Story Mode the players are found in a 3D side-scrolling adventure. The gameplay derives from classics such as Streets of Rage and Double Dragon, in which you are given a certain amount of time to defeat enemies and proceed to the next level, except in a 3D environment.
- Arena Battle - A two to four player versus fighting mode.

=== Unlockable modes ===
- Shadow Fighter (Unlocked by beating Urban Fighters mode once) - Plays much like a standard fighting game. You fight enemies one or two at a time and you must defeat them in 2 out of 3 rounds.
- Survivor (Unlocked by beating Urban Fighters mode twice) - Same as Shadow Fighter except that you only have one round within which to fight and can't lose.
- Team Battle (Unlocked by beating Urban Fighters mode three times) - Same as Arena Battle except you can group players into teams.
- Street Gang Battle (Unlocked by beating Urban Fighters mode with Kintaro, Angela, or Akujin) - A one-on-one fighting mode where players fight with the help of CPU allies.

== Playable characters ==
- Travis (Street Fighting)
- Michelle (Military)
- Ushi (Brute Force)
- Tetsuo (Martial Arts)

=== Unlockable characters ===
- Kobuchi - (Unlocked by beating Urban Fighters mode with Tetsuo and Ushi)
- Gorilla - (Unlocked by beating Urban Fighters mode with Travis and Michelle)
- Kintaro - (Beat Urban Fighters mode with Gorilla to unlock Kintaro in all modes except Urban Fighters mode. Beat Urban Fighters mode on the hard difficulty setting to unlock Kintaro in Urban Fighters mode)
- Angela - (Beat Urban Fighters mode with Kobuchi to unlock Angela in all modes except Urban Fighters mode. Beat Urban Fighters mode on the hard difficulty setting to unlock Angela in Urban Fighters mode)
- Akujin - (Unlocked by beating Urban Fighters mode on the hard difficulty setting)

== Reception ==
Reception

Aggregate score
Aggregator	Score
GameRankings	66%

Review scores
Publication	Score
AllGame	3.5/5
CNET Gamecenter	5/10
Electronic Gaming Monthly	5/10
Game Informer	4.5/10
GameFan	(G.H.) 81% 78%
GamePro	3.5/5
GameSpot	7.4/10
IGN	7.8/10
Jeuxvideo.com	16/20
Next Generation	4/5
Official U.S. PlayStation Magazine	3/5

The game received "average" reviews according to the review aggregation website GameRankings. Daniel Erickson of NextGen said, "It's hardly revolutionary, but Gekido's the best beat 'em up in a long time on the PlayStation, and [it] comes with a fun fighting mode to boot."

== Sequels ==
=== Gekido Advance: Kintaro's Revenge ===
A sequel to the game, Gekido Advance: Kintaro's Revenge, was released for the Game Boy Advance. On March 22, 2018, Gekido: Kintaro's Revenge was re-released for the Nintendo Switch, PlayStation 4, Xbox One, and Microsoft Windows.

=== Gekido: The Dark Angel ===
The developer, NAPS Team, announced that a second sequel was in development for the PlayStation Portable titled Gekido: The Dark Angel. A few screenshots and a trailer were released. The release date was projected to be December 2006. The teaser trailer for Gekido: The Dark Angel resembles anime-like characters and a character named Samuel with looks that seem to have been inspired by Dante from Capcom's Devil May Cry. The gameplay seems to take place in a stunning 3D world with vast environments. The interview provided by PSMania that can be found on IGN stated that the developer moved the environment in the game from Japan to Italy.
