= Ballerburg =

1987 video game

- Publisher: Eckhard Kruse
- Designer: Eckhard Kruse
- Programmer: Eckhard Kruse
- Platform: Atari ST
- Release: April 1987
- Genre: Artillery
- Modes: Single-player, multiplayer

Ballerburg is a turn-based artillery game released in 1987 for the Atari ST. It was written in C by Eckhard Kruse and distributed free of charge as public domain software. It was also donationware as the author asked for donations of 20 DM, offering as incentive the source code for the game.

== Gameplay ==
Ballerburg was designed for two players, both of which can be human or computer-controlled. In the game, two enemy kingdoms, separated by a mountain, try to destroy the castle of the enemy by exchanging cannonballs. Two conditions can lead to victory: either you pulverize the opponent's king by directly hitting him with a cannonball, or you ruin the enemy kingdom's economy until the king capitulates automatically. There is a choice of various castles, each of them outfitted with multiple cannons, one destroyable storage room for each, gunpowder, cannonballs and money, and a vane. One cannon can be fired per turn, which is done by adjusting the firing angle and amount of powder. An additional challenge is generated by the wind, which changes its strength each turn. The game also simulates a simple economy system: Prices to replenish the stock of balls and powder and replace destroyed cannons and vanes alter each turn. You have the possibility to build (destroyable) derricks for more income and can raise or lower taxes, which will be reflected in the morale of your people. Unhappy people would abandon you and instead join your opponent.

== Legacy ==
Years later, in October 2004, the author released the game with source code for free download on his website (public domain software). The source code availability resulted in several ports to other systems with SDL, for instance to Windows, Linux, and Mac OS.

In April 2012, on the 25th anniversary of the game, an iOS port was released, endorsed by the original author.

In 2001 there was another game by Ascaron, without endorsement of Kruse, under the name Ballerburg. In 2003 the game was ported by Phoenix Games to the PS1.

== See also ==
- List of open source games
