= Lola & Virginia =

Spanish children's animated television series

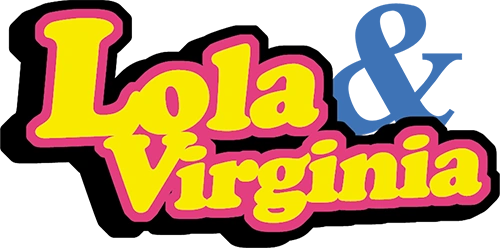
- Created by: Myriam Ballesteros
- Developed by: Myriam Ballesteros
- Written by: Gaëlle Baron; Micha; Txema Ocio; Isabeau Merle; Fethi Nedjari
- Directed by: Myriam Ballesteros
- Voices of: Yolanda Mateos; Ana Esther Alborg; Amparo Bravo; Carmen Cervantes; Jorge Saudinos; Ricardo Escobar; Adolfo Moreno; Inés Blázquez; Vicky Angulo; Sara Vivas
- Composer: John Gladstone Smith
- Country of origin: Spain
- Original languages: Spanish; English
- No. of seasons: 1
- No. of episodes: 26 (52 in 15 minutes)

Production
- Executive producers: Doug Murphy; Sergi Reitg
- Editor: Javi Cuesta
- Running time: 30 minutes
- Production companies: ICON Animation; Imira Entertainment; Euskal Telebista; Televisió de Catalunya

Original release
- Network: Disney Channel Spain; EITB (Basque)
- Release: 14 March 2006 – 2007

Lola & Virginia is a Spanish children's animated television series created and developed by Myriam Ballesteros and produced by Imira Entertainment. It first premiered on Disney Channel in Spain on 14 March 2006 and ended in 2007. It lasted 26 episodes for one season.

== Plot ==
In the neighborhood of San Lorenzo, Lola is a young girl who has a hard life taking care of her siblings and putting up with her friends. Along comes Virginia Toffen, a stuck-up, bratty, rich girl who always gets in her way. They soon become enemies and begin fighting over everything.

== Characters ==
Lola – The show's protagonist. Lola lives in a working-class family with one younger brother, one baby sister, and her mother, and her enemy is Virginia. Her father is never shown. She mainly wears a short red buttoned dress which is identified as one of the cheapest clothes to wear in the episode "The Uniform" and she is short and stout with short jet-black hair and also wears round purple glasses.

Virginia Toffen – The show's antagonist, daughter of a very wealthy and successful toilet paper entrepreneur. Virginia suffers from a symptom where she thinks she is the middle of the universe, as revealed in the episode "The Uniform". Her enemy is Lola, and she is used to hanging out with a girl named Beatrice and formerly Leticia. She is a bratty rich girl who always gives her parents a hard time and usually gets what she wants. She is tall and thin with long blonde hair and is usually seen wearing a black leather coat, blue jeans, and black and silver sunglasses.

Poppy – One of Lola's best friends, who is rebellious and tomboyish. She wears a lavender top with a skull and red skirt. She is often seen accompanying Lola in their adventures. She has dyed hair in colour.

Haide – Another of Lola's friends, she is usually seen with Lola and helping her with problems, along with Poppy. She and Poppy are occasionally involved in trying to reveal Virginia's plans. While in class, she believes deeply in astrology. She is originally from the Caribbean country of Cuba.

Agi and Yukio – The twin geniuses at San Lorenzo High. They are frequently seen working together on creating robots and other gadgets. Their adventures take them to different places, including trips to the Amazon rainforest and the Gobi desert.

Beatrice – One of Virginia's friends, or so she thinks. She is always seen with Virginia and helping her with her plots and schemes to embarrass Lola. She is also briefly seen helping Lola (but only to get Virginia's friendship back).

Charlie - A student from San Lorenzo High. Charlie hangs out with Lucas and Chuck and likes skateboarding. Lola and Virginia have crushes on him, often fighting to get him.

Lucas – The sneak. His closest friends are Charlie and Chuck. In one episode, Virginia offered him to impersonate Marco Amore and make Lola sad. However, Lola discovered Virginia's scheme, and he ended up dressing up as Marco to take Lola home. The episode concluded with the "Marco" cake that Lola made being thrown at his face.

Chuck – One of Lola's classmates and his best friends are Charlie and Lucas. Haide used to have a crush on him, and Lola used to date him, a revealed secret that nearly broke Lola and Haide's friendship. He is African-Spaniard.

Suzie – One of Lola's classmates. She is a sweet, childish girl who still plays with dolls. She has an older brother, whom Lola and Virginia formerly had crushes on. She is seen hanging out with Lola and some of her other classmates.

Marco – A boy at Lola's school. He is shy and a little quiet. He has blond hair and wears a red shirt. He is not to be confused with Marco Amore.

Hugo – One of the students from San Lorenzo High, Hugo is the school's most talented dancer, even being the star of one of Marco Amore's music videos. He liked to desire food and formerly dated Virginia.

Marco Amore – The hit pop singer in the town, Marco has all of adoring fans, including Lola, Virginia, and the rest of Lola's class. Lola liked him a lot, especially since she is the head of the Marco Amore fan club. His real name is Jon Johnson.

Leticia – Virginia's former friend from her old private school, Columbus. Their friendship broke apart in the episode "San Lorenzo vs. Columbus" because of Virginia winning a horse race, thanks to Lola angering Virginia. Virginia later says (as recorded by Haide on Lola's video camera) that she doesn't need Leticia.

Ana – Teacher of San Lorenzo High.

Gustavo Buliavez – The school's chef. He used to teach Lola, her friends, and Marco Amore's music.

== Episodes ==
No.	Title
1	"The Onion Trick"
1	"Incognito"
Lola is crazy about Charlie, the most handsome and enigmatic boy of her class. Virginia enjoys boasting to her classmates of having conquered Charlie and even to have kissed him. Lola cannot stand it. / John Bloon, a successful teenage actor, flees from fame because he wants to be a normal boy and have real friends. He shows up incognito at Lola's school.
2	"I Saw it First"
2	"Ideal Boyfriend"
Lola and Haide are friends since kindergarten and nothing nor nobody has been able to separate them. Virginia, who is green with envy of their friendship, decides to break it. The opportunity presents the day when the girls buy a shirt. / Lola is in love with Charlie, the most handsome kid in school. But she has nothing to do, because Charlie recently has a girlfriend: a stunning girl who is two years ahead of them. One day, Lola witnesses Charlie and his girlfriend's breakup.
3	"Beauty Treatment"
3	"Haunted House"
Lola wants to buy a special gift for her friend, Haide, but has no money. She finds an opportunity when she learns that a makeup brand is looking for a new face for its advertising. / Lola, Haide and Poppy, because of a school project, visit Poppy's aunt, Zara Ofricati, an old anthropologist who stores up many objects from distant primitive cultures at her house.
4	"Good Food & Rock N' Roll"
4	"Planet Girl"
Lola, Poppy and Haide have formed a rock band with the help of Gaston Bouillabaisse, their music teacher. Lola dreams of being a star like Marco Amore, who was the teacher's student at his childhood. / Lola is a great fan of an ecology programme shown on TV, Friendly Planet, which is hosted by the Planet Girl. One day, the Planet Girl comes to school to promote a recycling campaign.
5	"Mayhem in the Snow"
5	"Bye, Doll"
During a winter sports class, Lola prepares to have fun skiing with her friends. However, she does not expect that Virginia decides to make her own path with the ski professor. / Lola and Virginia are prepared to share the tent at a camp among school students. That night, a classmate of childish behaviour and appearance named Merceditas is in the same tent.
6	"Roller Coaster"
6	"Problem Pets"
A theme park opens in the city. Lola and her friends are crazy about entering the park the day it opens, so they work hard and get money for the tickets. However, they discover that all the tickets are sold out. / Lola takes home all kinds of helpless animals she finds lost around the neighbourhood, and her friends trust her with their pets when they cannot look after them. However, the house is too small and her mother tells her she has to take out all the pets.
7	"Dream Team"
7	"Elder Brother"
Lola and Virginia have been selected in the same team for the school championship. They have two things in common: they cannot be together, and they both want to win. / One day, Virginia tells a joke to Lola and she becomes the laughing stock of the classroom. Virginia plans everything so that Lola is to blame for the joke. The teacher, outraged, punishes Lola.
8	"Unhappy Birthday"
8	"Lola Fashion"
Lola's birthday is approaching. She expects, like every year, for her classmates to celebrate her birthday at her home. The party was supposed to be modest but funny. However, it's Virginia's birthday on the same day! / Virginia comes to school with a dress designed by a prestigious designer. All her hopes to shock everyone are shattered when she finds Lola capturing her classmates' attention with a shirt she painted herself.
9	"Magic Garden"
9	"The Secret Club"
At school, Lola, Poppy and Haide diligently choreograph a dance for the end of the semester show. Like them, the whole class wants their acts to be chosen, so the selection process becomes chaotic. / Lola, Poppy and Haide form the Secret Club. At the beginning of each month, they come together to tell their secrets and keep them written in an old tin can. Each month, one of the three is responsible for the can, but problems arise.
10	"A Moped for Two"
10	"Perfect Friendship"
Lola participates in a raffle where she stands to win the motorcycle of her dreams if she draws the right cards. This makes Virginia also want a motorcycle. It is easier for her, as she only needs to ask her parents for it. / Lola learns that Oswaldo Porri, Virginia's personal therapist, is about to allow her to return to her past school. The therapist believes that she has made great progress, but there is still a matter to be resolved.
11	"Headline News"
11	"Pair of Aces"
Lola works in the editorial staff of a school newspaper. Time is running out and they still don't have a theme for the cover. The only solid option is a report on Agi and Yukio, the twins who are about to solve a difficult equation. / Poppy and Carlos are the school's skating representatives, and they are chosen to participate in a major test to be held in Barcelona. Lola is green with envy after learning they will spend a week together.
12	"A Shoulder to Cry On"
12	"Kinky Kindred"
Lola is in love with David, a boy who comes to school for a short time. She feels really let down when she learns that he is in love with Virginia. However, when she realises Virginia does not love him back, Lola tries to conquer him. / In history class, the teacher asks students to make a family tree. Virginia tries to make a fool of Lola, but in the end, it is she who eventually makes a fool of herself.
13	"Afraid of What?"
13	"Oh No, Not Her!"
Before watching a scary film, Lola and Virginia challenge each other to see who is the bravest. They realise that a scary film is not enough, so they decide to spend a night in San Lorenzo's cemetery, a target of sinister rumours. / Lola introduces all her friends to an exchange mate, Chichita Gonzales, until she discovers that she is a joker and manages to make Virginia take her home. Finally, the rivals join forces to frame Chichita.
14	"Hugo in Love"
14	"Fan Club"
Virginia makes Hugo, the most beastly student from the institute, to carry out her own physical work. Hugo falls madly for Virginia and asks her on a date, but she laughs at him in front of everybody. / Lola is the head of the singer Marco Amore's fan club and writes a biography about her idol. He reads it, gets impressed, and wants to go to San Lorenzo to meet Lola. But when Virginia finds out about this, she decides to pretend to be her.
15	"Blackmail"
15	"30 Minutes Flat"
With the robot contest at the institute, Lola and her friends work restlessly on their creation. When she sees the twins getting out of the lab where Virginia works, she suspects that they are being suppressed and decides to investigate. / Lola wants to work during summer and offers Virginia's father, a customer at the twins' restaurant, the sushi delivery service to his house. He accepts delightedly and asks Virginia to work with him during the holidays to gain expertise.
16	"On the Sidelines"
16	"I Survived 100 Days in San Lorenzo"
Lola is the current captain of the school's all-girls basketball team. For the first time in 47 years, they will play the final. If they win, the girls will become a legend at school. Therefore, Virginia seeks to be the captain. / Virginia gives her friends a book written by her: "A Hundred Days in San Lorenzo". In the book, the neighbourhood is described as a disgusting place and Lola and her friends as a wretched group. Virginia appears as a heroine full of virtues.
17	"Good Morning, San Lorenzo"
17	"Love Soap"
Lola has a program in the institute's radio that is very popular among students. Virginia is jealous of Lola's success and decides to launch her own programme targeting to defeat her. Anything goes on this contest. / Virginia has tea with friends from her former school and she hears a rumour that makes her furious: at the Columbus, it is said that she doesn't have a boyfriend in her new school. To save her honour, she pretends that Carlos is her boyfriend.
18	"Frog Party"
18	"Tyrannosaurus Virginia"
During a biology lesson, Virginia decides to use a frog for the next costume party and develops a wicked plan: making Lola believe that the biology teacher wants to dissect the frog so that she organises a rescue operation. / Lola came back to her job of walking dogs. During a night in which she is working with a group of hounds, she gets to know that the twins, Agi and Yukio, found a fly's fossil and will star in "Jóvenes Genios" (Young geniuses), a scientific programme on TV.
19	"Carnival"
19	"Frozen Heart"
The carnival has come and with it a procession of floats and troupes from all the schools across the city. In San Lorenzo's school, the troupe's theme hasn't been decided yet, so Virginia wants to stand out among her friends. / In San Lorenzo's neighbourhood, an ice cream shop has been opened with a special corner for lovers, the love seat. Lola dreams of sitting there with the unachievable Charlie. Unexpectedly, the opportunity comes during a math exam.
20	"The Olympic Torch"
20	"Teacher's Pet"
The interscholastic games are close and, this year, are being held in San Lorenzo's school. The organisation committee has decided to choose an student to carry the torch from the municipal stadium to the school's playground. / On the spur of the moment, Lola's baby siblings ruin her school work for which she had worked really hard. In spite of being reprimanded for the presentation, Lola is acclaimed by the teacher in front of the entire class for the content of her writing.
21	"Pyjama Party"
21	"San Lorenzo vs. Columbus"
Virginia and her friends from the Columbus school organise a slumber party at Virginia's. It is so boring that her reputation sinks, so she works out an idea to save her next party: inviting Lola to laugh at her. / The city's teaching centres hold a cultural sports championship. For the first time, thanks to Virginia's participation at the equestrian, the San Lorenzo's team reaches the final. She feels part of her classmates.
22	"Brushstrokes"
22	"The Uniform"
Virginia's family tradition is to hang a painting made by her each time her father builds or buys a building. On this occasion, her father finances the school's library's expansion and Virginia shows off among her classmates. / One fine day, Lola reaches the school and finds all of her friends wearing a school uniform. She realises that wearing a uniform has been made compulsory by the school. Lola, who hates it, radically opposes this imposition.
23	"Dear Diary"
23	"The Lightning Man"
Virginia's academic results at San Lorenzo's school are not so good and the psychotherapist gives a piece of advice to her parents: to retain her credit cards until she starts making an effort and passes her math exams with outstanding grades. / Santi, Virginia's former friend from Columbus, joins the school. Lola and her friends dream that he is a handsome boy, but Virginia breaks their dream remembering he was ugly. What she doesn't know is that he's become a good-looking boy.
24	"21st Century Cinderella"
24	"Compulsive Buyer"
Lola, dressed up as a cup of yoghurt, is going to a costume party at the school. On her way, she is rushed by a taxi in which Antonio Redondo, a handsome and well-known teenage tennis player, is dressed up as a charming prince. / Virginia is a compulsive buyer. Her parents go to the psychotherapist, but he is unable to solve the problem. When there is nothing else she could do, Virginia's mother realises that the only person who could control her daughter is Lola.
25	"Dear Lola"
25	"A Boyfriend for Haide"
Lola convinces her friends to make an extra-large emblem for their football team. This turns out to be a success and Lola becomes the school's most popular student. Haide and Poppy appoint her as the "Student of the Year". / Lola's girl classmates are jealous of her friendship with Haide. Virginia, who seeks to be the centre of attention, cannot bear it and is planning to end that friendship in a week's time.
26	"High Treason"
26	"Secret Love"
Haide discovers in a webpage called "The Magic of Names" that her ideal boyfriend is called Chuck and she falls for the only Chuck she knows. Lola, in spite of her skepticism regarding magic, helps her friend to win his heart. / Virginia shows off having captivated the most handsome boy in one of her parties. An envious Lola brings up Charlie's name and makes up a lie that even she cannot believe: he has been Lola's secret boyfriend for a while.

== Telecast and home release ==
Lola & Virginia was broadcast on several European channels, including Disney Channel in Spain and Italy, France 3, Pop Girl, POP!, and RTP 2. It was also shown on Animania HD in the US before it ceased operations in 2009. In Brazil, the show aired on SBT. It also aired on Nickelodeon in some countries. In September 2014, the series was added to Hulu. As of 2022, the show is now streaming on Amazon Prime.

== Live action ==
Imira Entertainment and Brave Films produced a live-action version of "Lola & Virginia".

== Video game ==
In 2009, a self-titled video game was released for the Nintendo DS by Virgin Play under their publishing brand V.2 Play. The gameplay consists of the player (Lola) completing a series of tasks, included with some mini-games.
