= Phoenix Games B.V. =

Dutch video game publisher

Phoenix Games
- Type: Besloten vennootschap
- Industry: Video games
- Founded: 2002
- Founders: Willie Horden
- Defunct: March 27, 2012
- Fate: Dissolved
- Headquarters: Netherlands

Phoenix Games B.V. was a Dutch video game publisher founded by Willie Horden, Paul Share and Steve Share in 2002. The studio billed itself as a "Super Budget Publisher" whose games were developed by small, independent studios under a strict budget and timeframe. Their games—especially those for the PlayStation 2—earned them notoriety in gaming circles due to their poor quality, though they are also sought after by video game collectors.

The studio declared bankruptcy on August 3, 2010. On March 27, 2012, the company was dissolved due to a lack of assets.

== History ==
Phoenix Games B.V. was founded by Willie Horden in 2002, with a goal of selling up to 4 to 5 million games per year. Instead of relying on traditional games distribution channels, Phoenix's games were sold at newsagents and convenience stores at £6.99 to £12.99 per game depending on the platform. Phoenix published one of the last PlayStation games—a shooter game compilation entitled Shoot—in 2005. Localizations for specific countries was done externally by Partnertrans.

On 4 November 2002 they announced their partnership with Japanese company Altron, and Italian developer NAPS team. In December 2002 Phoenix announced that they had acquired the publishing rights to Dragon's Lair, Space Ace, Who Shot Johnny Rock? and Mad Dog McCree from Digital Leisure in Canada. In February 2003 they announced that their games will distributed by Just in the UK, Joag in Italy, SGDiffusion in France and N-Tec in Hungary. The company also put up booths at E3 2004 and 2005 to display their games.

In 2003 Phoenix announced that they partnered with an unnamed UK-based developer for "a range of super-budget titles" for the PlayStation 2 and Xbox, sold for £9.99. Phoenix Games UK CEO Paul Share stated that they no longer found it necessary to licence and localise games from Japanese developers, instead relying on British development studios to produce games for the company.

In 2013, the German Videospielarchiv held an art exhibition named "Coverstrophen" at that year's GamesCom, where they showed cover arts for many of their PlayStation 2 games.

== Reception ==
Despite having limited coverage in mainstream gaming publications, the company earned a negative reputation for the exceptionally poor quality of their games, which have generally been regarded as "bargain bin" shovelware comparable to budget-priced titles from System 3 Software under the Play It label. Their interactive activity centre games based on adaptations of fairy tales and mockbusters of popular cartoons by the German animation studio Dingo Pictures were widely lampooned on YouTube and spawned various internet memes.

The European localization of Touge 3—developed by Cave and Atlus and released by Phoenix as Road Rage 3—was somewhat better received, though it was also criticized by gaming publications such as the Official PlayStation Magazine for its subpar gameplay and graphics. The same for the PlayStation port of Sonic Wings Special. Dalmatians 2 appeared as one of the most sold budget PlayStation titles in the first half of March 2004.

== List of games ==
=== With Dingo Pictures ===
- ...noch mehr Dalmatiner as Dalmatians 2, 3, 4 (PS1, PS2, Wii, DS)
- Das unglaubliche Fussballspiel der Tiere as Animalfootball (PS1), Animal Soccer World (PS2)
- Atlantis as: Atlantis (PS1), Imperium von Atlantis (PS2)
- Toys as: Toys (PS1), Kids Playground (PS1), The Toys Room (PS2)
- Abenteuer Im Land der Dinosaurier as Dinosaurier (PS1), Dinosaur Adventure (PS2)
- Ein Fall für die Mäusepolizei as Detective Mouse (PS1), The Mouse Police (PS2)
- Herkules as Herkules (PS1)
- Winkie der kleine Bär as Winky the Little Bear (PS1)
- Der König der Tiere: Das Große Abenteuer as: Son of the Lion King (PS2), Lion and the King 2 (PS1) Lion and the King 3 (DS)

=== Other activity center games ===
- Peter Pan (PS2) / Peter Pans Playground (Wii, DS)
- Snow White and the 7 Clever Boys (PS2) / Princess Snow White (Wii)
- Cinderella (Wii, PS2) / Cinderellas Fairy Tale (Wii)
- Pinocchio (PS2) / Adventures of Pinocchio (Wii, DS)
- Mulan (PS2)

=== Sony PlayStation ===
Game	Developer	Release	Notes
5 Star Racing	Kung Fu Games	November 15, 2003	
All Star Action	Mere Mortals	2003	
All Star Watersports	TheyerGFX	March 14, 2003	
Baldies	Creative Edge Software	August 8, 2003	
Ballerburg: Castle Chaos	Ascaron Entertainment	January 4, 2003	
Block Buster	Marvelous	August 8, 2003	
Buttsubushi	Selen	August 13, 2004	
Checkmate 2	Mere Mortals	2003	
Cindy’s Caribbean Holiday	Ivolgamus	January 2003	
Cindy’s Fashion World	Ivolgamus	January 2003	
Destructo 2	Axes Art Amuse	June 10, 2003	
Flying Squadron	NAPS team	2003	
Football Madness	NAPS team	March 28, 2003	
Hot Shot	NAPS team	June 27, 2003	
Jet Ace	NAPS team	November 15, 2004	
King of Bowling 3	DigiCube	June 27, 2003	
Omega Assault	NAPS team	August 19, 2004	
Paradise Casino	DigiCube	2003	
Pro Backgammon	Mere Mortals	2003	
Robin Hood: The Siege	Ivolgamus	March 2, 2004	
Robopit 2	Mere Mortals	2003	
Rox	Mere Mortals	2003	
Rhythm Beat	Ivolgamus UAB	2004	
SHOOT	NAPS team	2005	
Silent Iron	NAPS team	2004	
Space Rider	NAPS team	August 9, 2004	
Sonic Wings Special	Video System	August 12, 2004	
Superbike Masters	Kung Fu Ltd.	June 10, 2004	
Trickshot 7 Games	Selen	March 14, 2003	
Truck Rally	Kung Fu Ltd.	August 9, 2004	
Wanted	NAPS team	2004	

=== Sony PlayStation 2 ===
Game	Developer	Release	Notes
¡Qué pasa Neng! El videojuego	Mere Mortals	December 11, 2006	Spain-exclusive release; published together with Atari Ibérica
21 Card Games	Mere Mortals	July 28, 2006	
Air Raid 3	Mere Mortals	2004	
American Pool II		2007	
Arcade Action: 30 Games	Mere Mortals / SG Diffusion	November 19, 2004	
Arcade USA	Mere Mortals	April 21, 2006	
Board Games Gallery	Mere Mortals	March 25,2005	
Cartoon Kingdom	The Code Monkeys	2007	
Carwash Tycoon	Aqua Pacific	September 29, 2006	
Caveman Rock	Phoenix Games	2007	
Chemist Tycoon	Aqua Pacific	September 29, 2006	
Clumsy Shumsy	Ivolgamus UAB	October 27, 2006	Has Eye Toy Support
Cool Shot	DigiCube	January 23, 2003	
Combat Ace	Mere Mortals	October 13, 2006	
Crabby Adventure	CyberPlanet Interactive	December 1, 2007	
Crazy Golf	Tuna Technologies Ltd.; Beyond Reality Games Ltd.; Mere Mortals Ltd.	February 25, 2005	also on PC, Published together with Empire Interactive
D-Unit Drift Racing	Mere Mortals	October 13, 2006	
Dead Eye Jim	Na.p.s. Team s.n.c.	January 12, 2007	
Doomsday Racers	Mere Mortals	July 15, 2005	
Downhill Slalom	Mere Mortals	October 6, 2006	
Drag Racer USA	Mere Mortals	October 27, 2006	
Dynamite 100 (100 in 1 Game)	Mere Mortals	2006	
European Tennis Pro	Magical Company	2004	
Extreme Sprint 3010	Mere Mortals	2007	
Finkles World	CyberPlanet Interactive	2005	
Fruitfall	Mere Mortals	2007	
Furry Tales	Mad Monkey	October 22, 2004	
G-Force	Mere Mortals	October 6, 2006	
Game Galaxy 2	Phoenix Games	2006	
Gecko Blaster	Phoenix Games	December 1, 2007	
Girl Zone	Mere Mortals	2005	
Go Kart Rally	Phoenix Games	April 20, 2007	
Guerilla Strike	Mere Mortals	2006	
Habitrail Hamster Ball	Data Design Interactive	2005	
Hamster Heroes	Data Design Interactive	2005	
Hansel & Gretel	Aqua Pacific Ltd.	November 24, 2006	
Homerun	Magical Company Ltd.	2004	Japan: Magical Sports 2001 Pro Yakyū
Hoppie	CyberPlanet Interactive.	2006	
Iron Chef	CyberPlanet Interactive.	December 1, 2007	
Jello	CyberPlanet Interactive.	2006	
K.O. King	Phoenix Games	November 03, 2006	
Kiddies Party Pack	The Code Monkeys	2006	
Kidz Sports Basketball	Data Design Interactive	31 August 2004	
Kidz Sports Ice Hockey	Data Design Interactive	EU: 14 March 2008 AU: 15 May 2008	
Kidz Sports International Football	Data Design Interactive	30 May 2008 or July 28, 2006	known as City Soccer Challenge
London Cab Challenge	Mere Mortals	July 28, 2006	
Mambo	CyberPlanet Interactive.	2007	
Maniac Mole	Mere Mortals	July 28, 2006	
Marble Chaos	Phoenix Games	August 10, 2007	
Monster Eggs	CyberPlanet Interactive.	April 20, 2007	
Monster Trux Extreme	Data Design Interactive	2005	
MOTO X MANIAC	Phoenix Games	March 9, 2007	
Myth Makers: Orbs of Doom	Data Design Interactive	2007	
Myth Makers: Super Kart GP	Data Design Interactive	2007	
Ocean Commander	CyberPlanet Interactive	2007	
Obliterate	Mere Mortals	April 21, 2006	
Offroad Extreme	Data Design Interactive	2007	
Power Volleyball	Phoenix Games	January 26, 2007	
Pro Biker 2	Phoenix Games	2007	
Puzzle Party: 10 Games	Mere Mortals	July 28, 2006	
RC Toy Machines	Mere Mortals	November 5, 2004	
Retro	Aqua Pacific	2006	
Road Rage 3	Atlus	JP: 2001 EU: 2003 AU: 2004	Japan: Toge 3
Robin Hood: The Siege 2	Mere Mortals	October 6, 2006	
Roller Coaster Funfare	Phoenix Games	October 12, 2007	
Saint & Sinner	CyberPlanet Interactive	January 2, 2006	
Search & Destroy	Mere Mortals	June 2006	
Shadow of Ganymede	Mere Mortals	June 24, 2005	
Skateboard Madness Xtreme Edition	Phoenix Games	April 20, 2007	
Sniper Assault	Na.p.s. Team s.n.c.	April 20, 2007	
Snooker 147	JHC SoftWare	2006	also on PC, Published together with Empire Interactive
Snow Rider	Tuna Technologies	October 6, 2006	
Space Rebellion	Mere Mortals	December 18, 2006	
Speedboat GP	Mere Mortals	2006	
Speed Machines III	Mere Mortals	2006	Sequel to Speed Mashines (Publ. by Midas Interactive)
Steam Express	CyberPlanet Interactive	December 1, 2007	
Street Warrior	Phoenix Games	January 12, 2007	
Swat Siege	Na.p.s. Team s.n.c.	November 24, 2006	
Superbike GP	Mere Mortals	2006	
Transworld Skateboarder		January 26, 2007	
Turbo Trucks	Mere Mortals	2006	
Urban Constructor	Uxus Games	September 30, 2005	
Vegas Casino 2	Mere Mortals	March 25, 2005	
Wacky Zoo GP	Phoenix Games	2007	
White Van Racer	Tuna Technologies	February 4, 2007	
WWC: World Wrestling Championship	Phoenix Games	2006	
X-treme Quads	Mere Mortals / Tuna Technologies	March 4, 2005	also on PC
Xtreme Speed	Mere Mortals	October 8, 2004	

=== PC ===
Game	Developer	Release	Notes
Ballerburg			
Casino 59			
Classic 17			
Corona			
Crazy Golf			
Dark Angæl			
Doomsday Racers		2006	
Drone Odyssey			
Go Cart Racer			
Go Kart Simulator Championship 2010		2010	
LKW Simulator 2010		2010	
Motorcross Simulator Championship 2010		2010	
Rhythm Beat			
Space Rebellion			
Sport 9			
Stable Masters 2			
Trickshot 7 „Games“			

=== Nintendo DS ===
Game	Developer	Release	Notes
12 (12 Games)	NorthPole Studio	December 1, 2008	
Coral Savior			
Iron Chef II			
Jungle Gang			
Love Heart			
Monster Eggs 2			
Polar Rampage	CyberPlanet Interactive	2009	
Rat-a-box			
Valentines Day	NorthPole Studio	August 28, 2008	
Veggy World	Jack of All Games		
War of Heaven			

=== Nintendo Wii ===
Game	Developer	Release	Notes
Caveman Rock 2			
Hoppie 2		20. February 2009	
Iron Chef 2			
Monster Egg 2		20. February 2009	
Ocean Commander 2		Cancelled	
Saint & Sinner 2			

=== PSP (unreleased) ===
- Peter Pan
- Board Game Gallery (announced 2004)
- King of Pool
- Card Shark 3
- Vegas Casino 2

=== Other ===
- Twin
- Space Ace by Don Bluth (DVD)
- Who Shot Johnny Rock? (DVD)

== See also ==
- Phoenix Games, an unrelated board game publisher from 1978 to 1981.
- List of video games notable for negative reception
