= Kidz Sports =

Kidz Sports is a series of 4 games developed by Data Design Interactive between 2004 and 2008 for the PlayStation 2, Microsoft Windows and Wii. The games depict simplified versions of Basketball, Ice Hockey, Professional Football, and Mini Golf.

Versions of the games for the Xbox, PlayStation Portable and GameCube were planned, but never materialised.

== Games ==
=== Basketball ===
Kidz Sports Basketball
- Developer: Data Design Interactive
- Publishers: PAL Regions; Phoenix Games B.V. (PS2); Metro3D Europe (PC); Data Design Interactive (Wii); North America; ValuSoft (PC); Bold Games (Wii)
- Platforms: PlayStation 2, Windows, Wii
- Release: PS2: EU: 31 August 2004; PC: EU: 6 January 2006; Wii: NA: 2 January 2008
- Genre: Sports
- Mode: Multiplayer

Kidz Sports Basketball is a sports video game title from English developer/publisher Data Design Interactive. The game was released on the PlayStation 2 in 2004 and on the PC in 2006. It was released on the Wii in 2008.

Kidz Sports Basketball was reviewed by IGN, and received a 1.0 out of 10. It was criticized for awful gameplay, and bad graphics.

=== Ice Hockey ===
Kidz Sports Ice Hockey
- Developer: Data Design Interactive
- Publishers: PAL Regions; Data Design Interactive (PC); Phoenix Games B.V. (PS2); Data Design Interactive (Wii); North America; ValuSoft (PC); Bold Games (Wii)
- Platforms: Wii, PS2
- Release: NA: 14 January 2008; EU: 14 March 2008; AU: 15 May 2008
- Genre: Sports
- Modes: Single-player, multiplayer

Kidz Sports Ice Hockey is a video game for the Wii console. It was created by Data Design Interactive, a budget developer.

The game received overwhelmingly negative reviews, including a 1.0/10 from IGN, saying that "There isn't a single redeeming quality in this package. Don't bother."

=== International Football ===
Kidz Sports International Football
- Developer: Data Design Interactive
- Publishers: PAL Regions; Phoenix Games (PS2); Data Design Interactive (Wii); North America; ValuSoft (PC); Bold Games (Wii)
- Platforms: Wii, PS2
- Release: NA: 22 February 2008; AU: 15 May 2008; EU: 30 May 2008
- Genre: Sports
- Modes: Single-player, multiplayer

Kidz Sports International Football (known as Kidz Sports International Soccer in North America and City Soccer Challenge for the European-exclusive PS2 version) is a video game for the Wii console. It was created by Data Design Interactive, a budget developer.

=== Mini Golf ===
Kidz Sports Crazy Mini Golf
- Prototype cover art
- Developer: Data Design Interactive
- Publishers: EU: Data Design Interactive; NA: Bold Games
- Series: Kidz Sports
- Platform: Wii
- Release: NA: 16 September 2008; EU: 7 November 2008; EU: 21 September 2009 (Wii MotionPlus version)
- Genre: Sports

Kidz Sports Crazy Mini Golf (Released as Kidz Sports Crazy Golf in North America) is a golfing simulator developed and published by Data Design Interactive exclusively for the Wii console. Originally released in 2008, the game was re-released in Europe in 2009 with added Wii MotionPlus support.

=== Mini Golf 2 ===
Kidz Sports Crazy Mini Golf 2
- Developer: Data Design Interactive
- Publishers: NA: XS Games; EU: Green Solutions
- Series: Kidz Sports
- Platform: Wii
- Release: NA: 6 October 2009; EU: 2011
- Genre: Sports

Kidz Sports Crazy Mini Golf 2 (Released as Crazy Mini Golf 2 in North America) is the sequel to Kidz Sports Crazy Mini Golf. It includes Wii MotionPlus support. The game was released by XS Games in North America in October 2009. It was intended for a European release later that year but was not released until 2011, where it was published under Green Solutions, the parent company of Data Design Interactive.
