= Gekido Advance: Kintaro's Revenge =

2002 video game

- Developer: NAPS team
- Publishers: EU: Zoo Digital Publishing; NA: DSI Games; WW: Naps Team (Switch)
- Platforms: Game Boy Advance, Nintendo Switch, PlayStation 4, Xbox One, Microsoft Windows
- Release: Game Boy Advance: EU: November 8, 2002; NA: November 25, 2003; Nintendo Switch: WW: March 22, 2018; PlayStation 4: WW: May 31, 2018; Xbox One: EU: July 12, 2018; NA: July 13, 2018; Microsoft Windows: WW: December 1, 2018
- Genre: Beat 'em up
- Modes: Single player, multiplayer

Gekido Advance: Kintaro's Revenge is a beat 'em up game for the Game Boy Advance, created by Italian studio NAPS Team. It is a sequel to the PlayStation game Gekido. Unlike the previous installment, this game centers on one protagonist, instead of multiple characters as seen in Gekido. A version for N-Gage was planned but never released.

In 2018, Gekido: Kintaro's Revenge was re-released for the Nintendo Switch, PlayStation 4, Xbox One, and Microsoft Windows.

== Plot ==
The game focuses on Tetsuo, who has returned to his sensei's house only to be dispatched to a remote farming village where it seems as if the dead rise from the grave. Upon further investigation, Tetsuo finds out that the village has been having strange happenings ever since the old temple became overrun with demons. When he returns to the village after talking to the old guardian of the Temple, the village has been attacked, supposedly, as one of the dying villagers says, by "...ravens..." Also, it seems as if all the children have vanished as well.

== Reception ==
Reception

Aggregate score
Aggregator	Score
Metacritic	70/100

Review scores
Publication	Score
GamesMaster	85%
GameSpot	6.9/10
Nintendo Power	4/5

The game received "average" reviews according to the review aggregation website Metacritic.

== See also ==
- List of beat 'em ups
