= Baldo: The Guardian Owls =

2021 action-adventure game

- Developer: NAPS team
- Publisher: NAPS team
- Designer: Fabio Capone
- Composer: Gianluca Cucchiara
- Platforms: PlayStation 4, PlayStation 5, Xbox One, Nintendo Switch, Windows, iOS, macOS
- Release: August 27, 2021
- Genre: Action-adventure
- Mode: Single-player

Baldo: The Guardian Owls is an action-adventure video game developed and published by NAPS team. It was released for Nintendo Switch, PlayStation 4, Xbox One, Microsoft Windows, as well as iOS and macOS through Apple Arcade. The Switch version of the game was scheduled to be released first in summer 2020 as a timed console exclusive, but the game was indefinitely delayed in September of that year. The game was released on August 27, 2021.

Inspired by The Legend of Zelda and Studio Ghibli's films, it is an action adventure RPG, with puzzles, exploration and combat, set in a crafted hand-drawn open world. It was released on PlayStation 5 on January 22, 2024.

== Plot ==
Baldo takes place in the fictional land of Rodia. In undergrounds of this world owls sealed a powerful creature without a heart. According to the prophecy, this creature will free itself when a "pure child" is born. This prophecy has begun to come true and the player's task is to overcome its consequences.

== Production ==
Baldo is a production of the Italian studio NAPS team. The studio's artist Fabio Capone stated that: "The idea started a long time ago, as a game called The Dark Knight ... That project ended once the GameBoy Advance era came to an end. It was a shame. A few years ago, once technology that allowed better cartoon shading came around, we thought it was a good time to get our hands on the project once again."

The game is inspired by The Legend of Zelda: "It isn't focused on combat mainly, although that's a big part of it, but it will share a lot of elements from the Zelda series ... At its core Baldo is a puzzle and dungeon game, although there are plenty of other secrets inside".

The game features a hand-drawn art style inspired by Japanese anime, including movies by Studio Ghibli and works by Hayao Miyazaki, with decrepit ruins, mystical libraries and quaint forest towns filling the screen, each with their own distinctive colours and picturesque backgrounds. Capone stated: "I've always loved Japanese anime and that style since I was a kid. I always dreamed about a game that could bring people into that kind of magical world. No one's done that yet, so I decided to do it myself."

The game was released on August 27, 2021.

== Reception ==
Reception

Aggregate score
Aggregator	Score
Metacritic	iOS: 49/100

Review scores
Publication	Score
IGN	4/10
Nintendo Life	4/10
The Games Machine (UK)	8.6/10

Baldo received "mixed or negative" reviews, according to review aggregator Metacritic. Nintendo Life called it "excruciatingly difficult, repetitive and clunky", but praised the artstyle. IGN said that "it's almost like Baldo is passive-aggressively daring you to stop playing it altogether".

In August 2021, the game ranked thirteenth among the most downloaded games from the Nintendo eShop in Europe.
