= Touch the Dead =

2007 video game

- Developer: Dream On Studio
- Publisher: Virgin Play (Note: Released under V.2 Play in North America.)
- Composers: Allister Brimble, Anthony N. Putson, Paul Carter
- Platform: Nintendo DS
- Release: EU: March 26, 2007; NA: May 16, 2007; UK: October 4, 2007
- Genre: Rail shooter
- Modes: Single-player, multiplayer

Touch the Dead (known as Dead 'n' Furious in Europe) is a 2007 rail shooter/survival horror game developed by French company Dream On Studio and published by Virgin Play for the Nintendo DS.

== Gameplay ==
Touch the Dead is a rail shooter. Players use the stylus to point at oncoming zombies on the bottom screen. Pointing fires the weapon Steiner has equipped, and shots can be delivered to the head, arms, legs, and stomach.

To reload, players must simply grab a clip icon (located in the bottom right-hand corner of the touch screen), and drag it to the bottom left hand corner which has an image of the 'magazine'.

The D-pad and face buttons of the console are simply used to switch weapons. Both serve the same purpose, and work for both right-handed and left-handed players.

Health and ammunition can be recovered by shooting crates and cabinets. The player also has the option of shooting switches to open doors and choose a left or right path when a fork appears. Either path chosen will still yield the same bonuses.

=== Weapons ===
- Handgun: The first weapon Steiner obtains. It is the weakest of the game's firearms, doing the least amount of damage. It does, however, have unlimited ammunition. The handgun does not allow belly shots. Steiner finds the handgun on the floor in Chapter 1. Resembles the Beretta M9/92F.
- Shotgun: A standard pump-action shotgun. The shotgun is most effective at close range, and can blow off heads and stomachs. Steiner finds the shotgun in a control room in Chapter 1. Resembles the Spas 12 shotgun.
- Submachine Gun: Steiner's only fully automatic weapon in the game. He obtains it while stopping in a shack, located in the swamps of Chapter 3. Resembles the MP5 type K.
- Crowbar: Steiner's only melee weapon, also used to break down certain doors. Steiner gets it from the boss of Chapter 2. Resembles a crowbar.

== Storyline ==
Protagonist Rob Steiner, or Prisoner #1809, has been transferred to Ashdown Hole State Penitentiary. Steiner has been accused of and sentenced for a murder that he did not commit. The intro movie shows him being transferred, and his mugshots. Resting in his cell, Steiner's cell door opens. Seeing his chance for escape, Steiner flees his cell into the Penitentiary, which is mysteriously occupied by zombies. By the game's end, Steiner has gone through the entire prison, the sewer system, the prison hospital, and the rooftops of the prison. Steiner eventually escapes, but realizes that there is much more to go. He finds an airboat that he uses to dredge through a thick swamp, until he eventually comes to an abandoned military base. Steiner fights his way through the zombie-infested base, and is ultimately rescued via helicopter. It is also implied, though not mentioned directly that Steiner was placed there on purpose by the military or whoever it was that rescued him. The moment Steiner is saved, one of the men tells him that they did not believe he would make it out and that Steiner is more dangerous than they had previously thought. It ends with Steiner being placed in handcuffs and the choppers leaving what appears to be an island.

== Development and release ==
In March 2006, Spanish publisher Virgin Play announced they had acquired worldwide publishing rights to Touch the Dead.

The game was distributed under Eidos Interactive's Secret Stash Games label in North America. A week following its US release, it reached the top 10 in game sales for the DS that week.

The game's North American box art was created by artist Arthur Suydam, famous for his work on the Marvel Zombies line of comics.

== Reception ==
Reception

Aggregate score
Aggregator	Score
Metacritic	56/100

Review scores
Publication	Score
1Up.com	D+
The A.V. Club	C+
Eurogamer	5/10
Game Informer	7/10
GameDaily	7/10
GameSpot	5.5/10
GameSpy	2/5
GameZone	5.9/10
IGN	6.9/10
Nintendo Life	8/10
Nintendo Power	5.5/10
Pocket Gamer	3/5
Retro Gamer	65%
X-Play	1/5
411Mania	7/10

The game received "mixed" reviews according to the review aggregation website Metacritic. It was heavily criticized for its "blocky" graphics and repetitive sound; however, it received great appreciation for its innovative gameplay which makes excellent use of the touch screen. Most complaints stemmed from its reloading system which requires the player to move a magazine from one side of the screen to the other to reload, wasting precious seconds in an already difficult game. IGN cited its mediocre graphics and poor originality. GameSpot also criticized the graphics, but still appreciated its original gameplay. GamePro said that the game was "laughably bad at points but there's a loveable [sic] camp quality to it that makes it worth enduring through." (Note: GamePro gave the game 3.5/5 for graphics, 1.75/5 for sound, 3/5 for control, and 2.75/5 for fun factor.) Nintendo Life gave the game a positive review while it was still in development.
