= Lamborghini (video game) =

- Developer: Rage Software
- Publisher: Majesco
- Platforms: PlayStation 2, Xbox, GameCube, Windows
- Release: Cancelled (scheduled in late 2003)
- Genre: Racing
- Modes: Single-player, multiplayer

Lamborghini is an unreleased racing game developed by Rage Software and published by Majesco. It was cancelled in 2003 due to Rage Software's bankruptcy. The team that worked on Lamborghini went to found the game studio Juice Games, which created the Juiced series.

A playable demo of the game can be found in the European March 2003 issue of the Official Xbox Magazine. On May 14, 2022 an Xbox Live Beta version was uploaded to Archive.org, which contains the full game playable offline.

== See also ==
- Juice Games
- Juiced series
