= Final Armada =

2007 video game

- PSP cover art
- Developer: I-Imagine Interactive
- Publisher: Virgin Play
- Platforms: PlayStation 2, PlayStation Portable
- Release: GER: May 4, 2007; UK: September 14, 2007
- Genre: Vehicular combat
- Modes: Single-player, multiplayer

Final Armada is a vehicular combat game developed by I-Imagine Interactive and published by Virgin Play. It was released only in Europe for PlayStation 2 and PlayStation Portable in 2007.

== Reception ==
Reception

Aggregate score
Aggregator	Score	
Aggregator	PS2	PSP
Metacritic	40/100	48/100

Review scores
Publication	Score	
Publication	PS2	PSP
4Players	37%	35%
Eurogamer	3/10	N/A
GamesMaster	N/A	59%
Jeuxvideo.com	7/20	7/20
PlayStation Official Magazine – UK	3/10	2/10
Play	57%	N/A
Pocket Gamer	N/A	2.5/5
PSM3	42%	N/A
VideoGamer.com	3/10	N/A

The game received "generally unfavorable reviews" on both platforms according to the review aggregation website Metacritic.
