= Monster Trux: Arenas =

- Developer: Data Design Interactive
- Publishers: EU: Phoenix Games B.V. (PlayStation 2); EU: Metro3D Europe (Microsoft Windows); EU: Data Design Interactive (Wii); NA: Conspiracy Entertainment
- Platforms: PlayStation 2, Microsoft Windows, Wii
- Release: PlayStation 2: EU: 10 December 2004; Microsoft Windows: EU: 6 January 2006; Wii: NA: 25 September 2007; EU: 26 October 2007; AU: 17 January 2008
- Genre: Racing
- Modes: Single-player, multiplayer

Monster Trux: Arenas (Known on the PlayStation 2 and Windows as Monster Trux Extreme - Arena Edition) is a video game developed by Data Design Interactive and published by Phoenix Games originally for the PlayStation 2, where it was released exclusively in Europe in December 2004. before being ported to Microsoft Windows in January 2006 and Wii in Late-2007.

== Release ==
The game was originally announced as Monster Arenas in November 2004, with Data Design Interactive announcing that budget publisher Phoenix Games would publish the title. an Xbox version was also announced, but never materialized.

== Reception ==
The game received overwhelmingly negative reviews. IGN gave it a 1.0 for bad graphics, presentation, sound and gameplay.
