= Virgin Play =

Defunct video game distributor and publisher

Virgin PLAY S.A.
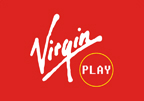
- Type: Private
- Industry: Video games
- Founded: 1995 (as Virgin Interactive España SA); November 1, 2002; 23 years ago (as Virgin Play)
- Founder: Tim Chaney and Paco Encinas
- Defunct: September 2009
- Fate: Liquidation
- Headquarters: Madrid, Spain
- Subsidiaries: V.2 Play; V.2. Play Portugal; PlayV Ltd (50/50 Joint Venture with Playlogic Entertainment)

Virgin PLAY S.A. (formerly Virgin Interactive España S.A.) was a Spanish video game company that mainly handled distribution of titles in Spain and Portugal. The company later expanded to publishing video games throughout European territories.

== History ==
Virgin Play began operations in 1995 as Virgin Interactive Entertainment España S.A.. Formed by employees Mariele Isidoro and Francisco Encinas, it was the Spanish distribution arm of British video game publisher Virgin Interactive Entertainment which marketed and distributed the company's titles in Spain and later released titles from Interplay Entertainment, Titus Interactive and Swing! Entertainment in the country, much like its parent. Virgin Interactive España was also the Spanish distributor for titles released by The 3DO Company, Midway Games, Light & Shadow Production, and Midas Interactive.

=== Separation as Virgin Play ===
On May 14, 2002, Virgin Interactive España SA announced that it would undergo a management buyout led by VIE's former CEO Tim Chaney and VIE España's co-founder Francisco Encinas. Titus Interactive accepted the deal, which was closed on June 11. As part of the buyout, Titus signed an exclusive distribution agreement to allow VIE Espana to remain the distributor for the group's products (Titus, Virgin, Interplay) in Spain. In November, the company officially changed their name to Virgin Play.

By February 2003, the company secured a Spanish distribution deal with Ignition Entertainment.

In 2004, Virgin Play was secured as the distributor of the GP32 console in Spain, Italy and Portugal. This was due to the console's manufacturer, Game Park, suffering trading difficulties.

=== Self-Publication ===
In 2006, Virgin Play announced that it would start self-publishing games. The first game that was self-published by the company wasTorrente 3: El Protector, which was the first movie produced in Spain to have a video game tie-in. In March, they signed a publishing deal with Dream On Studio to publish their Nintendo DS tactical shooter Dead 'n' Furious for a November release. In April, they signed a publishing deal with I-Imagine Interactive for the release of Final Armada on the PlayStation 2 and PSP, which was the first video game for the two systems developed in South Africa. All three games were released the following year.

For 2007, Virgin Play spun off its publishing division separately as V.2. Play. In May 2007, the company signed a deal with DTP Entertainment which would allow the publisher to distribute the company's products in Germany, Austria and Switzerland. This was followed with a UK distribution deal with Koch Media in June. which would allow them to distribute in the United Kingdom. Additional game deals included one with Real Madrid in the same month and with Zinkia Entertainment for the Pocoyo franchise in October. In July 2007, Virgin Play announced it would open an office in Lisbon, Portugal to expand within the market and offer a more personalized treatment to Portuguese companies. The office would be branded under the V.2 Play name.

On March 11, 2008, the company announced they had acquired the rights to produce and distribute a video game based on the animated television series Lola & Virginia. The following day, they launched the V.2 Play website. In April, they announced the release of the Mind Your Language language-training software for the Nintendo DS. in July, Virgin Play signed an Italian distribution deal with Atari Italy for the titles. On May 29, Virgin Play formed a UK publishing joint-venture with Playlogic Entertainment known as PlayV. The venture would bring video games from both companies to the United Kingdom while also offering PR, marketing and sales solutions to additional partners looking to penetrate the UK retail market. The first titles released by PlayV were released in October. In June, Axón Capital invested in the company, of which Virgin Play acquired a stake in Spanish developer Enigma Productions.

=== Liquidation ===
In September 2008, Tim Chaney left Virgin Play and later set up his own gaming platform, called Zattikka in June 2009.

In June 2009, Virgin Play asked a Spanish court for three months to seek a solution with its creditors due to a lack of liquidity. Exactly 3 months later, in September 2009, Virgin Play entered liquidation and ceased all operations.

== List of published games ==
Release	Title	Developer	Platform(s)	Notes
2005	Torrente 3: El Protector	Virtual Toys, S.L.	PlayStation 2, Microsoft Windows	First self-published game by the company
2007	Final Armada	I-Imagine	PlayStation 2, PlayStation Portable	
2007	Touch the Dead; Dead 'n' Furious	Dream On Studio	Nintendo DS	Published by Eidos Interactive in North America
2007	Snow X Racing	Coldwood Interactive	PlayStation 2	European publishing rights only. Published by Valcon Games in North America
2008	Crusaders: Thy Kingdom Come	NeocoreGames	Microsoft Windows	Physical European PC release only, published by NeocoreGames elsewhere
2008	War Leaders: Clash of Nations	Enigma Software Productions	Microsoft Windows	Physical European PC release only, published by DreamCatcher Interactive in North America
2008	Donkey Xote	Revistronic	PlayStation 2, Microsoft Windows, Nintendo DS, PSP	
2008	Super Hind	Mountain Sheep	PSP	
2008	Hello Pocoyo!	Zinkia Entertainment	Nintendo DS	
2008	Warriors of the Lost Empire	Platinum Egg	PSP	European publishing rights only, published by UFO Interactive Games in North America and Ertain in Asian countries including Japan
2009	B Team: Metal Cartoon Squad	Most Wanted Entertainment	Nintendo DS	
2009	Lola & Virginia	Frima Studio	Nintendo DS	
2009	Mind Your Language	Spiral House	Nintendo DS	Available in English, French, Spanish, German and Japanese versions
2009	Real Madrid: The Game	Atomic Planet Entertainment	PlayStation 2, Wii, Microsoft Windows, PSP	A Nintendo DS version was also planned, but was scrapped after Virgin Play's liquidation.
2009	Away: Shuffle Dungeon	Artoon	Nintendo DS	European publishing rights only, published by Majesco in North America and AQ Interactive in Japan
2009	El Internado: Laguna Negra	Artefacts Studio	Nintendo DS	Only released in Spain. Was to be released in other countries as The Boarding School: Black Lagoon in late 2009, but was scrapped after Virgin Play's liquidation
