= NAPS team =

Italian video game studio

- Company type: Private
- Industry: Video games
- Founded: 1993; 33 years ago
- Founder: Fabio Capone; Domenico Barba
- Headquarters: Messina, Sicily, Italy
- Website: napsteam.com

NAPS team is an Italian independent video game studio based in Messina, Sicily. They work mostly in the home computer and console market. It is the oldest-running Italian game development studio.

== History ==
The company was established as a game developing house in 1993 by Fabio Capone and Domenico Barba.

Like many software houses established in the 1990s, their first market was on the 16-bit Amiga.

In 2016, the company started work on the game Iron Wings. The company used Kickstarter to raise funds. Completed in 2017, it features aerial warfare and is set in World War II.

In 2018, Gekido: Kintaro's Revenge was re-released for the Nintendo Switch, PlayStation 4 and Xbox One.

Baldo: The Guardian Owls, a role-playing video game inspired by The Legend of Zelda series, but with a graphic style inspired by the animated films produced by Studio Ghibli, was announced in 2019.

== Reception ==
In 1996, Shadow Fighter was ranked the 20th best game of all time by Amiga Power.

== Video games ==
Games developed by NAPS team:

- Shadow Fighter (Amiga, 1994, published by Gremlin Interactive)
- Gekido: Urban Fighters (PlayStation, 2000, Gremlin Interactive)
- Gekido Advance: Kintaro's Revenge (Game Boy Advance, 2002)
- Rageball (2002)
- Shoot (2002)
- Football Madness (2003)
- Silent Iron (2003)
- Omega Assault (2003)
- Flying Squadron (2003)
- Hot Shot (2003)
- Wanted (2004)
- Jet Ace (2004)
- Shoot (2005)
- Racing Fever (2005)
- SWAT Siege (2006)
- WWI: Aces of the Sky (2006)
- WWII: Battle Over The Pacific (2008)
- Sniper Assault (2006)
- Dead Eye Jim (2007)
- They Came From the Skies (2007)
- Apache Longbow Assault (2007)
- Operation Air Assault 2 (2007)
- Twin Strike: Operation Thunder (2008)
- Bootcamp Academy (2010)
- Maria the Witch (iOS, 2014, PC, Android, 2016, Xbox One, 2017, Nintendo Switch, PlayStation 4, 2018)
- Legendary Knight (2015)
- Iron Wings (Xbox One, 2017)
- The Knight and the Dragon (Nintendo Switch, 2019)
- Baldo (Nintendo Switch, PlayStation 4, Xbox One, PC, 2021)

== See also ==
- Gremlin Interactive: company founded by Ian Stewart that published Shadow Fighter
