= 16 Tales =

- Genres: Edutainment; Visual novel
- Developer: The Lightspan Partnership
- Publisher: Lightspan
- Platform: PlayStation
- First release: NA: 1996

16 Tales is a series of educational video games developed by The Lightspan Partnership starting in 1996. Each game consists of four 15-minute video programs detailing various cultures' stories and lore.
