= Demolition derby =

Motorsport where drivers ram vehicles into one another

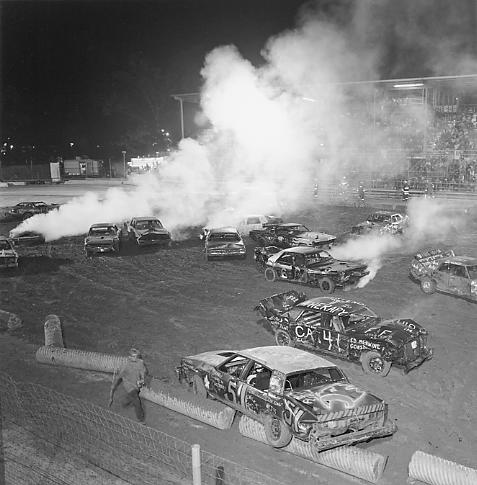
Competition at the West End Fair Demolition Derby, Gilbert, Pennsylvania. This annual event is held on three successive nights each August, with approximately 100 automobiles entered each night. Attendance at the event ranges from 2,000-4,000 spectators.

Demolition derby is a type of motorsport usually presented at county fairs and national events. While rules vary from event to event, the typical demolition derby consists of five or more drivers competing by deliberately ramming their vehicles into one another. The last driver whose vehicle is still operational is awarded the victory. Demolition derbies originated in the United States and quickly spread to other Western nations. For example, Australia's first demolition derby took place in January 1963. In the UK and parts of Europe, demolition derbies (sometimes called "destruction derbies") are often held at the end of a full day of banger racing.

In demolition derbies, serious injuries such as whiplash are rare, but they do happen. Drivers are typically required to sign a waiver to release the promoter of an event from liability. At almost all derbies, attempts are made to make the event safer; all glass is removed from the vehicles, and deliberately ramming a driver's-side door area is forbidden. The driver's door is often required to be painted white with black numbers or blaze orange, or with contrasting colors.

== History ==
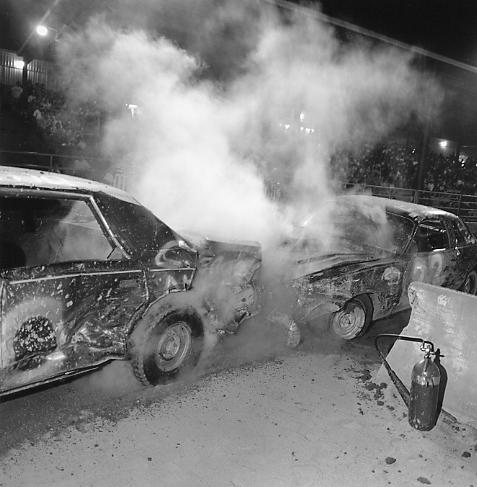
Sometimes the action unintentionally spills out of the "crash zone" boundaries. Fire extinguishers are conveniently placed for easy access. Many derbies have local firefighting crews standing by in the arena.

Demolition derbies were first held at various fairs, race tracks, and speedways by independent promoters in the 1950s. There are unconfirmed reports of events occurring as far back as the 1930s utilizing the abundant supply of worn-out Ford Model Ts. The originator of the concept for auto demolition derbies is disputed. One source says that Don Basile is often credited with inventing the demolition derby at the now demolished Carrell Speedway near Gardena, CA, in 1947. Another source states stock car racer Larry Mendelsohn created the concept for demolition derbies at New York State's Islip Speedway in 1958, after realizing many people favored wrecks to racing.

The sport's popularity grew throughout the 1960s, becoming a standard at county fairs and becoming a subculture nationwide. The popularity of demolition derbies also spread overseas. In 1963, a reported crowd of 20,000 packed into the Rowley Park Speedway in Adelaide to see Australia's first demolition derby. Due to the size of the crowd (about twice the venue capacity), the police closed the speedway's gates. The derby itself had over 75 entries and lasted for more than 100 minutes. Demolition derbies in Australia generally take place at speedways (usually on the opening or closing night of the season), with most cars being older model Australian-made sedans and wagons.

ABC's Wide World of Sports televised the World Championship Demolition Derby from the mid-1960s until 1992. In 1972, the Los Angeles Coliseum hosted a demolition derby with mint-condition late model cars driven by Mario Andretti, A. J. Foyt, and Bobby Unser. The popular ABC sitcom Happy Days included the character Pinky Tuscadero, a female professional demolition derby driver and occasional love interest to the show's most popular character, Arthur Fonzarelli. Folk-pop singer Jim Croce wrote and sung about the sport in one of his popular songs, "Rapid Roy (The Stock Car Boy)" on his 1972 album, You Don't Mess Around with Jim.

The sport's popularity peaked in the 1970s. But by the 1980s, the sport's popularity began to wane. With the demise of Wide World of Sports, television exposure of the event became scarce. In addition to safety concerns and the shortage of full-size vehicles, some felt that the sport had shown little change or innovation beyond its original premise.

In 1997, The Nashville Network (later part of CBS) returned demolition derby to national television in its TNN's Motor Madness series of various motor-sport events. Motor Madness derbies were primarily for broadcast and needed to fit into a time frame. Live demolition derbies could last indefinitely. Motor Madness changed the rules from last car running to largest number of offensive hits in a time frame. However, as part of MTV Networks' takeover of CBS Cable operations in 2000, demolition derbies, as well as the rest of the CBS motor-sports operations, were removed from programming as part of MTV's move to shut down the CBS Charlotte operation based at Lowe's Motor Speedway and generalize the network into a more broadly viewed channel. Pay per view was demolition derby's only national television outlet in the 2000s (decade). Two $50,000-to-win derbies were held in Widewater, Canada, from 2000-2001.

Later in the 2000s (decade), a proliferation of cable television shows about vehicle customizing occasionally showcased junked vehicles in bizarre competitions. Spike TV's Carpocalypse was a reality documentary series on variations of demolition derby filmed in Orlando, FLA. The Speed Channel also aired team demolition derbies in 2005. Cable TV's exposure has led to renewed interest in the demolition derby.

In 2006, the partners of Mike Weatherford Promotions (Mike Weatherford and Dustin Swayne) started DerbyMadness.com while promoting the NAPA Auto Parts Crash for Cash Series. The first annual final show paid out $5,000.00 to the winner of the series. Before competing in the final show, derby drivers across several states had to qualify at any one of the participating NAPA Crash for Cash qualifying derbies. There were over 100 cars in the final show. The series was a success and continues to grow every year. The 2007 series money was doubled, so competition was expected to increase for the 2008 series. The NAPA Auto Parts Crash for Cash Demolition Derby held in Paris, TN on September 19, 2009, was the final event in this series. In 2025, a demolition derby was held at Bristol Motor Speedway, a total payout purse of $310,000.00 was advertised. The competitors ruined over 3 million dollars of cars during the multi day event, the purse has yet to be paid by promoter Dustin Woods. Current court filings show that Dustin Woods has legal actions pending against him.

== Vehicles ==
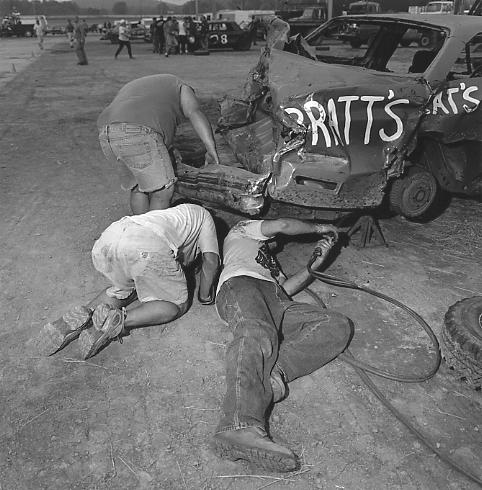
Pit crews have to work together efficiently in order to repair heat-winning cars so they can return to compete in the feature event. Most derbies require that the same car qualifying in the heat must be used in the feature. Occasionally, some derbies allow heat winners to use a fresh car in the feature.

Competitors have traditionally used full-size, American-made sedans and station wagons, especially those from the 1960s and 1970s, which are larger, heavier, and had more robust frames than later full-size vehicles. The 1964–1966 Imperial achieved near-legendary status for its crashworthiness, and it is still banned from most derby events. Scrap vehicles are purchased from junkyards and private owners, usually for less than US$500, though some select (and rust-free) mid-1970s sedans and station wagons may go for more than $1,000. Vehicles are often patched up and re-used for several events. Many of the cars used are 80s-2000s era vehicles with again stated above many go for less than a thousand dollars which makes it very acessible https://apnews.com/general-news-08ca386c14cb4b4d8fc927bf1ce5677f

With the dwindling availability of these older vehicles, smaller full-sized vehicles of the late 1980s and 1990s are more frequently encountered today. A separate class of demolition derby for compact cars is increasing in popularity. Compact car events have the advantage of an abundant supply of usable vehicles, which also tend to be more mobile and thus, more entertaining to fans. Being largely front-wheel drive vehicles, their back ends can sustain considerable amounts of damage before the vehicle is immobilized. However, this increased speed, coupled with the fact that compact cars tend to be less crashworthy, makes injuries more frequent.

Other versions of the sport using combine harvesters and riding lawn mowers have been practiced in various parts of the world. Larger vehicles, such as pickup trucks and SUVs, were rarely used in demolition derbies (though school bus demolitions have long been a popular exception) but have recently become popular. Recently a new class for minivans was added to some derbies because of the abundance of older minivan junk vehicles. Motorhome demolition derbies are another variation. Semi trucks have also been used in demolition derbies.

The vehicles are stripped of interior fixtures, trim, plastic, lights, and glass. They are repainted, often in loud, garish designs and on low budgets (spray paint is frequently used to mark names, slogans and identification). Additional modifications include trimming sheet metal from around the wheel wells, removing parts of bumpers, welding the doors shut, and relocating the battery and gas tank. The radiator is sometimes relocated to the back seat. To make the cars last longer, they are occasionally pre-bent, with frames notched, rear bumpers removed, trunk lids notched, and rear coil springs are (when rules allow) replaced with leaf springs. In many instances, roll bars, fire extinguishers, and other safety equipment are installed. Sometimes the removed parts create bulk availability of off-color parts for older cars that are compatible with them. In most cases, any vehicle parts must be "stock", though in some derbies a "gladiator" or "outlaw" division allows cars to be extensively modified and reinforced.

== Popularity ==
In 2001, the Los Angeles Times estimated that between 150,000 and 225,000 drivers participated in at least one of the 2,000 demolition derbies held in the United States that year. Event purses rose from a few hundred dollars to over $50,000 after the popularity of TNN's Motor Madness series.

In 2017, one of the most popular Demolition Derby series is the Tour of Destruction which features School Bus Racing, Trailer Racing, Car Soccer and a large Demolition Derby. These events are viewed by up to 5000 spectators.

== Rules ==
Derbies have many different sets of rules, often pertaining to how much welding can be done to the vehicle, and the class of car (example: compacts, trucks, minivans, full size; some rules are 1980 and newer, etc.). Drivers are often required to be at least 16 years old and hold a valid driver's license. They are required to have seat belt and a helmet, and, depending on sets of rules, roll over bars and cages inside the vehicle. An event usually begins with drivers lined up on the track facing rear to rear, or circling on an oval track. Drivers are usually required to crash into another vehicle every 2 minutes or they are labeled as "sandbagging" and become disqualified. Hitting a driver intentionally in the driver's door and sometimes rolling another car intentionally, are also grounds for disqualification.

When a car is disabled or loses power, the driver is allowed time to restart their engine, usually 30 seconds to a minute, and must be able to move. If the car cannot start and move, the driver is forced to concede and is eliminated from the heat. Most events require a slat of wood with a flag attached to be placed in the front column of the driver door, a judge breaks this to disqualify a driver, or a driver can break it in order to resign. The first and second place finishers of a heat move on to the next heat, in competitions with multiple heats.

Depending on the sanctioning body, it may be illegal for multiple cars to collaborate and gang up on opposing cars in a sandwich effort, and could result in disqualification for both parties that do so; although the enforcement of this rule varies widely. The time it takes for one of these events varies, depending on if the derby being run has multiple heats and feature, or just a single heat, as well as the types of vehicles being demolished (compact car derbies tend to be finished much more quickly than school bus derbies, for example). Normal heats can last anywhere from 10–30 minutes, while an entire event can take place over the span of a few days.

The last running car that makes contact with another driver wins the event. In addition to a winner, most derbies also award a "Best in Show" or "Mad Dog" award to the participant who puts on the most exciting or spectacular performance without winning the derby; this is usually decided by voice vote of the audience. (This is especially true in multiple-heat contests, where the addition of best-in-show provides more contestants for the feature event.)

== Rollover competitions ==
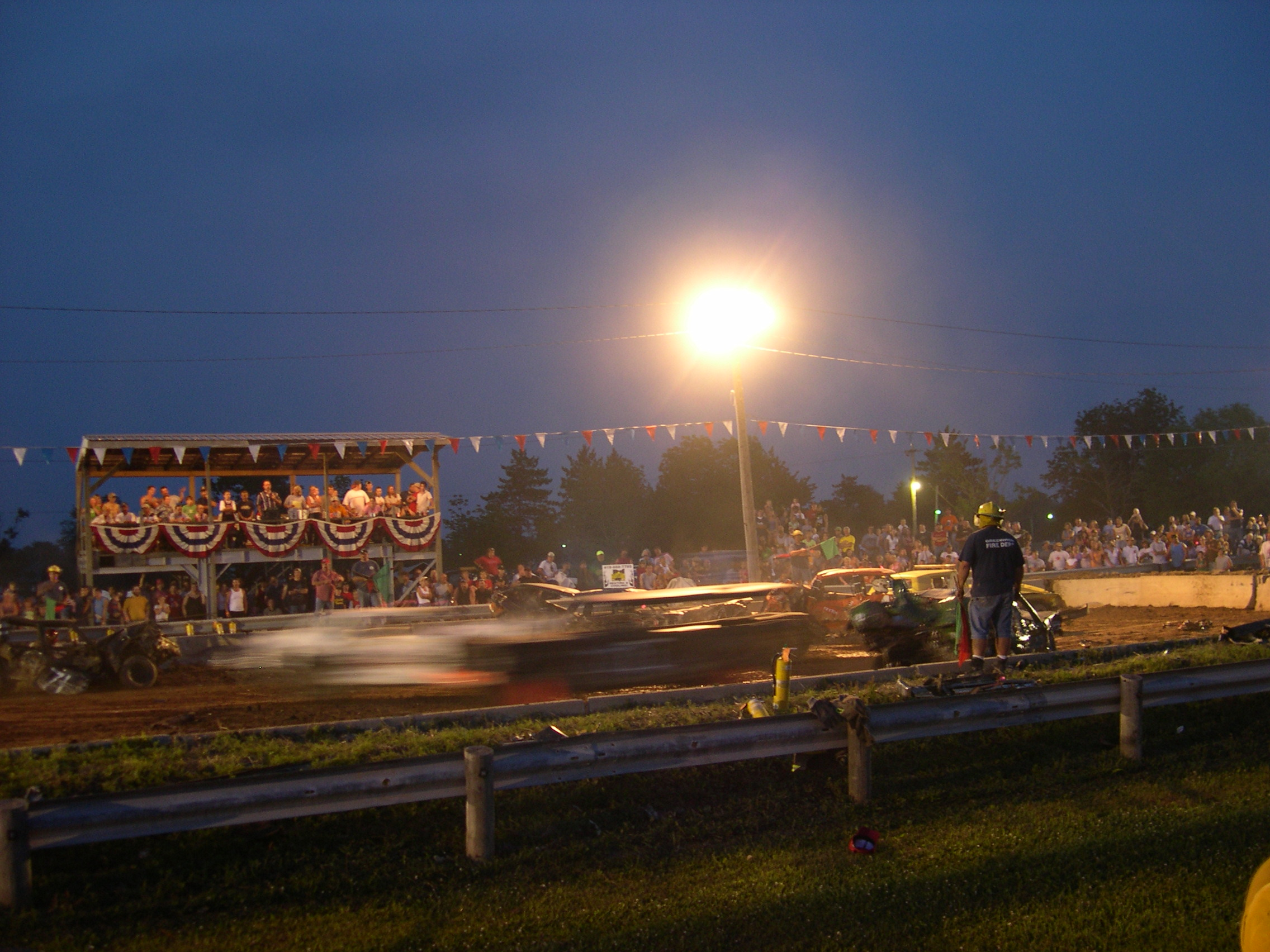
A demolition derby under way at the Greenwich, Ohio Firemen's Festival, 2005

Also included at some demolition derbies in the US and UK are rollover competitions, where the object is to drive a car so that only the wheels on one side hit a ramp, causing the vehicle to roll over repeatedly. Drivers take multiple runs at the ramp until their vehicle dies. The driver who completes the most rollovers before their vehicle ceases to function is declared the winner. Compact cars, especially hatchbacks, are used in rollover competitions. Their lighter weight enables them to roll more easily than larger vehicles. However, with modern high-horsepower unibody sedans and coupes now appearing on salvage lots, some of this conventional wisdom is being questioned and some major competitions have been won by drivers of small size, mid-size and full-size sedans.

== Video games ==
Demolition derby is a popular theme portrayed in video games. While some games aim to be a realistic simulation of real-life derbies, others such as vehicular combat games include gameplay features that would be impossible in real life. Notable demolition derby video games include:

- Auxiliary Power's Demolition Derby and Figure 8 Race
- BeamNG.drive
- Carmageddon, Carmageddon II, Carmageddon: Reincarnation
- Cars 3: Driven to Win
- Crash 'n' Burn
- Crashday
- The Crew 2, The Crew Motorfest
- Demolition Derby (Bally/Midway 1984 Arcade Game)
- Demolition Racer, Demolition Racer: No Exit
- Destruction AllStars
- Destruction Derby, 64, 2, Raw and Arenas
- Dirt: Showdown
- FlatOut, FlatOut 2
- Grid Autosport
- Hot Wheels
- Mayhem
- Race Driver: Grid
- Racing Destruction Set
- Rogue Trip: Vacation 2012
- SpongeBob's Boating Bash
- Test Drive: Eve of Destruction / Driven to Destruction
- Twisted Metal
- Wreckfest, Wreckfest 2

== See also ==
- Figure 8 racing
- Banger racing
