= Newman/Haas Racing (video game) =

1998 video game

Newman Haas Racing
- Developer: Studio 33
- Publisher: Psygnosis
- Platforms: PlayStation, Microsoft Windows
- Release: PlayStation: NA: March 31, 1998; EU: 1998; Windows: EU: October 23, 1998; NA: October 28, 1998
- Genre: Racing
- Modes: Single-player, multiplayer

Newman/Haas Racing is a racing video game developed by Studio 33 and published by Psygnosis for the PlayStation and Windows in 1998. It has been described as similar to Psygnosis's Formula One series.

== Development ==
Newman/Haas Racing was built on the same graphics engine as Psygnosis's earlier racing game Formula 1, without the enhancements which appeared in its then-recent sequel, Formula 1 97.

The game's audio commentary was provided by Danny Sullivan and Bob Varsha.

== Reception ==
Reception

Aggregate score
Aggregator	Score	
Aggregator	PC	PS
GameRankings	N/A	74%

Review scores
Publication	Score	
Publication	PC	PS
CNET Gamecenter	N/A	8/10
Computer Gaming World	1/5	N/A
Edge	N/A	6/10
Electronic Gaming Monthly	N/A	6.875/10
Game Informer	N/A	7.75/10
GameFan	N/A	69% (Note: In GameFan's viewpoint of the PlayStation version, one critic gave it a score of 62, and the other 76.)
GameRevolution	N/A	B−
GameSpot	5.5/10	7.3/10
IGN	N/A	8/10
Next Generation	N/A	2/5
Official U.S. PlayStation Magazine	N/A	2/5
PC Gamer (US)	22%	N/A

Reviews for the PlayStation version ranged from mixed to positive. It held a 74% on the review aggregation website GameRankings based on 13 reviews. Reviews widely praised the large number of tracks and drivers, the tight and responsive controls in both analog and digital mode, and the versatile settings. However, Electronic Gaming Monthly and GameSpot both argued that these numerous settings still are not enough to enable players to enjoy an arcade-style experience or adjust the difficulty to lower than hardcore levels, and concluded the game to be strictly for enthusiasts of simulation-style racing. GameSpot also felt the extreme length of the races, while true to Indy Car racing, would wear thin on casual players, and concluded, "Indy Car devotees have probably logged off and bought Newman/Haas already, but for the rest of us, a qualifying lap on the rental track is definitely recommended." IGN thought similarly, but phrased it more positively: "For gamers who like the sim in simulators, and just have to play the latest Indycar game, take a good hard look at Newman Haas Racing."

The most common criticism of the game was that the announcers have little to nothing meaningful to say and quickly become annoyingly repetitive. Next Generation and GameSpot also said the visuals suffer from excessive pop-up, primitive texture mapping, and a low frame rate. Contrarily, Electronic Gaming Monthly and GamePro said the frame rate is good and the pop-up, though occasionally a distraction, is minimal.

Next Generation concluded, "Judged purely as a racing game, Newman/Haas offers enough to make it one of the better examples of the genre, but considering that Psygnosis' F1 games have offered a similar experience for some time now, the game can only be considered a disappointment." Contradicting both this judgment and the reviews which considered the game strictly for simulation fanatics, GamePro concluded the game to be a good alternative for gamers who find the Psygnosis F1 games too hardcore and compared it favorably to CART World Series. (Note: GamePro gave the PlayStation version 4.0/5 for graphics, 3.5/5 for sound, 4.5/5 for control, and 4.5/5 for fun factor.) Electronic Gaming Monthly's four reviewers were split, with Sushi-X and Kelly Rickards saying that the game has flaws but offers respectable and versatile racing, while Shawn Smith found its realism not to his tastes, and guest reviewer Dean Hager deemed it only "decent".
