= Destruction Derby =

1995 video game

- North American PlayStation box art
- Developer: Reflections Interactive (Note: Ported to Sega Saturn by Perfect Entertainment)
- Publisher: Psygnosis
- Director: Martin Edmondson
- Producer: Tony Parks
- Designer: Martin Edmondson
- Composer: Tim Swan
- Platforms: PlayStation, MS-DOS, Windows, Sega Saturn
- Release: 20 October 1995: PlayStation; EU: 20 October 1995; NA: 16 November 1995 MS-DOS; NA: 31 October 1995; EU: November 1995 Windows; NA: April 1996 Saturn; EU: 15 August 1996
- Genres: Vehicular combat, racing
- Modes: Single-player, multiplayer

Destruction Derby is a 1995 vehicular combat racing video game developed by Reflections Interactive and published by Psygnosis for MS-DOS, PlayStation and Sega Saturn. Based on the sport of demolition derby, the game tasks the player with racing and destroying cars to score points. The developers implemented simulated physics to make the results of collisions easier to predict, and they kept the game's tracks small to increase the number of wrecks. Critics found Destruction Derby enjoyable and praised its graphics and car damage system, although the Saturn release received mixed reviews. The game started the Destruction Derby series, which continues with the 1996 sequel, Destruction Derby 2.

== Gameplay ==
The player engages in a Destruction Derby contest at The Bowl.

Destruction Derby is a vehicular combat racer based on the sport of demolition derby. The game contains three vehicles. Collisions in the game affect the controls of each car, limiting their steering and maximum speed. Frontal collisions risk damage to the car's radiator, which causes the car to overheat and stop running. Four game modes are available: Destruction Derby, Wreckin' Racing, Stock Car Racing and Time Trial. In Destruction Derby, the player earns points by destroying other cars in a large, trackless arena called The Bowl; in Stock Car Racing, the player must finish in first place, and no points are awarded for destroying cars. Wreckin' Racing is a hybrid of the two, in which the player earns points both by winning the race and by destroying other cars. Time Trial is a solo time attack mode. The PlayStation version features system link play for two players, while the MS-DOS version has an online multiplayer mode.

== Development and release ==
The British development studio Reflections Interactive began creating Destruction Derby for the PlayStation in late 1994. It was published by Sony Computer Entertainment's Psygnosis branch, which allowed Reflections to receive PlayStation development kits long before that console's release. The game debuted at the May 1995 Electronic Entertainment Expo, and its initial title was variously reported as Demolition Derby and Demolish 'em Derby. Writers for Edge and Next Generation commented that the game could "trounce" Ridge Racer upon the PlayStation's release.

To make the results of car collisions easier to predict, Reflections implemented simulated physics into Destruction Derby. Director Martin Edmondson believed that the game would otherwise be "completely unplayable", as with "pool when the collisions are all off". Producer Tony Parks noted that the physics were simplified to improve performance and to compensate for the PlayStation's digital controller, and that the team sought a balance between "realism and playability". Performance was also improved by optimising the game's graphics, and by reducing the level of detail of objects in the distance. Destruction Derby's game engine supports up to twenty cars on screen simultaneously, which no console racing game, other than Daytona USA, had achieved until that time. However, a single wire-frame model, differentiated by texture maps, was used for every vehicle. Damage to vehicles is modelled in real-time, based on the speed and angle of the cars involved. The team made the game's tracks small to "keep the density of the cars on the track very high", which allowed for large-scale wrecks. Plans were made to support up to eight players with the PlayStation Link Cable.

Destruction Derby was officially released on 20 October 1995 on PlayStation and then MS-DOS. Perfect Entertainment worked on the port to Sega Saturn; this version lacks transparencies. GameFan's Ryan Lockhart estimated that the port was "80% ready" in the magazine's August 1996 issue, and it was released in August 1996, in Europe and Japan only. In April 1996, an enhanced version of the game was released for Microsoft Windows, featuring a higher base resolution (512x384 as opposed to 320x200), a greater number of damage points to match the PlayStation version, and better texture quality. The PlayStation version was re-released through the PlayStation Network store in 2007, and then was included in the PlayStation Classic in 2018.

== Reception ==
Reception

Review scores
Publication	Score
Computer and Video Games	90% (PC), 3/10 (SAT)
Edge	7/10 (PS1)
Famitsu	25/40 (PS1, SAT)
GameSpot	7.1/10 (PC)
IGN	7/10 (PS1)
Next Generation	4/5 (PS1, PC)
PC Gamer (US)	88% (PC)
The Electric Playground	9/10 (PS1)
Dimension-3	93% (PC)
Sega Saturn Magazine	68% (SAT)

Writing for GamePro, Captain Squideo called Destruction Derby "the most raucous racing experience of the fall". He believed that its "graphics are almost all you could want for a game" of this type, but wrote that "nothing here stands out as graphically spectacular". He complained that the game does not let players customise cars, and he disliked its lack of split-screen multiplayer. He summarised, "Limited options keep Destruction Derby out of the winner's circuit, but this rowdy stock-car racer still generates a stadium full of thrashin' fun." Victor Lucas of The Electric Playground stated that "the beauty of the game" is the strategy involved in making "calculated strikes" against enemy vehicles, and he wrote, "If you go all out and try to make big noise on the track, more than likely you'll be limping to the scrap yard in seconds." He believed that the game's Stock Car racing mode "is no match for the white knuckle inertia of either Wipeout or Ridge Racer", and that the demolition derbies in The Bowl were "most fun to be had" in the game. He praised the game's graphics and physics, and concluded, "Destruction Derby is a winner in every capacity." A reviewer for Next Generation was extremely pleased with the concept of smashing into other cars, saying it taps into a near-universal fantasy. He remarked the single-player mode is indefinably "lacking" but the multiplayer offers unqualified enjoyment. The IGN reviewer commented that the controls are "way, way too loose".

The PC port was also well received. Lee Buchanan of PC Gamer US praised "the spectacular visuals that bring to life the most jarring collisions I've seen on a computer", and he noted that "[car] damage is depicted beautifully". Like Lucas, he wrote that the player "can't just mindlessly smash into other cars; this is thinking man's destruction". Although he found the game too easy "even at the toughest difficulty level", he found this to be a minor issue that did not detract from the experience. He considered the game's online play to be a high point, and he finished, "Destruction Derby is a blast, and a welcome change of pace from high-end driving simulations." Peter Olafson of Computer Gaming World called the game "a great simulation" of demolition derbies, and he wrote that the wrecks are "convulsive and realistic". He believed that the game "has never-before-seen quality that will instantly make it a showpiece game to demonstrate to open-mouthed friends and relatives", and he considered the car damage to be "especially marvelous—and unprecedented for this sort of game". However, he found that its "useful life span is surprisingly short" and he hoped for a track editor in its sequel. He summarised, "Despite its limitations, this is a great game, but it has a lot more potential." A reviewer for Next Generation remarked that while the game is a straight port of the PlayStation version, it is an impeccably accurate one. He applauded the authentic modelling of vehicle crashes, multiple modes, smoothness of gameplay, and inclusion of both network and modem options, and found the game's only downside is that the camera zooms out so little that it can be difficult to see nearby cars. Computer & Video Games said that the port is an "incredible conversion of the PS game which runs easily as fast and with as much detail."

Reviewing the game's Sega Saturn version, Kim Randell of Computer & Video Games noted its "inferior graphics" that do not have "the sheen and glossiness of its PlayStation counterpart". Randell believed that it was made "much too late to cause the kind of sensation that WipEout did. Comparisons with the PlayStation version are inevitable, and the rather haphazard conversion means that the Saturn version lacks the polish of its rival." Rob Allsetter's review in Sega Saturn Magazine (from the same publisher as Computer & Video Games) recycled most of the text from Randell's review, including the closing remarks.

=== Retrospective ===
Mike Channell of Top Gear in 2021 called Destruction Derby "technologically impressive" for its time. He further praised the strategic side to the "chaos": "You'd need to use reverse gear for as long as possible to avoid hobbling your radiator immediately". In a 2023 article by IGN as part of their '90s Week, Peer Schneider selected the game as one of three "forgotten launch gems" of the PlayStation, stating "you couldn't ask for a better tech demo to dazzle your friends than showing off 20 cars on screen, peeling out and crashing into each other."

=== Sales ===
The game sold more than 1 million copies by August 1996.

== Sequels ==
Destruction Derby received two sequels on the PlayStation: Destruction Derby 2 (1996) and Destruction Derby Raw (2000). There was also a Nintendo 64 exclusive title, Destruction Derby 64 (1999). The only PlayStation 2 title, and the last in the series, was Destruction Derby Arenas (2004).

== See also ==
- Demolition Racer
- FlatOut
- Wreckfest
- Destruction AllStars
