= Formula One 2001 (video game) =

2001 video game

- European cover art
- Developers: Studio 33 (PS); Studio Liverpool (PS2)
- Publisher: Sony Computer Entertainment (Note: PlayStation 2 version released under the 989 Sports brand name in North America.)
- Series: Formula One
- Platforms: PlayStation, PlayStation 2
- Release: EU: 25 May 2001; NA: 2 October 2001 (PS2)
- Genre: Racing
- Modes: Single-player, multiplayer

Formula One 2001 is a racing video game developed by Studio 33 and Studio Liverpool and published by Sony Computer Entertainment for the PlayStation and PlayStation 2. The PlayStation 2 version was released in North America by 989 Sports. It is a sequel to Formula One 2000 and was based on the 2001 Formula One World Championship. This is the last game to be released in North America until Formula One Championship Edition.

In some editions, a DVD was given for free. The DVD offers a commentated review of the 2000 Formula One World Championship, race by race, with the option to toggle between viewing the main stream, an on-board car camera, view the pitlane or see on-screen data such as lap times and positions. These features were used in the former pay-per-view F1 Digital+'s interactive coverage.

== Gameplay ==
The game's "arcade" mode followed a similar line to that of Formula One 2000, although incentives were now offered in the form of upgrades to the player's car.

A new mode - "Challenge" mode - was introduced. In Challenge mode, players were given a lap around Spa-Francorchamps in Jenson Button's Benetton B201. Players who achieved a fast lap time were given a verification code, and the opportunity to post their winning times on the Internet to compare their times to other people's if they had an account.

== Development ==
Formula One 2001 was created with the help of Benetton, Jaguar, Jordan and Arrows. Many of the employees from former franchise owner Psygnosis aided in the development. At the peak of development, the game was worked upon by 25 people with a majority of them being programmers and artists.

The game's engine was based upon a Research and Development project that began two years before the release of the game. This was to develop the physics, collision and A.I. for the game. Sony had an extensive reference library for the tracks including aerial photographs, close-ups of the tracks and over 200 hours of race footage from F1 Digital+. The PlayStation 2 graphical capabilities allowed the team to include more detail such as trackside details which were previously omitted and unique cockpit camera angles.

Studio Liverpool managed to contact Formula One Administration who provided audio samples for all the cars, but some of the audio samples provided were believed to be unsuitable. To rectify this, the developers spoke to Jordan and Prost and Sound Engineer Michael de Belle visited the garages to record the engine noises from the cars. The original PlayStation's central processing unit was used for sound processing.

=== Promotion ===
At the 2001 United States Grand Prix, Sony held a variety of sport promotions with Jenson Button and a multi-million advertising campaign. The advertising efforts in the United States included a national television campaign via network, cable and syndication sports programming. Promotions in print spreads and online advertising were also used.

A Formula One 2001 American Challenge was held on 29 September 2001 in Castleton, Indiana. The event saw a time trial competition using the game and was played by Jenson Button against consumer Chris Ohanian. Ohanian made it into the final round by scoring one of the top 2 times but in the final, he was defeated by Button who set a lap time of 1:15.6 compared to Ohanian's 1:16.0.

The game features all the drivers and tracks from the 2001 Formula One World Championship, although Tarso Marques' name is never mentioned by Murray Walker. Instead, on the PS1 version Murray Walker calls him "Minardi", but on the PS2 version nothing is mentioned. Depending on which version the player has, one of the replacement drivers (Pedro de la Rosa) that appeared in the real 2001 Formula One World Championship is in the game. The drivers Ricardo Zonta, Alex Yoong and Tomáš Enge were not featured. Despite Toyota unveiling the Toyota TF101 car, the Panasonic Toyota Racing team was also not featured.

In the European version of the game, released earlier in the year, Jean Alesi can be seen driving for the Prost Grand Prix while German driver Heinz-Harald Frentzen drives for the Jordan Grand Prix. In the American version, released on October of the same year, both drivers have switched roles as they also did in real life. On top of this, in the European version Luciano Burti drives for Jaguar Racing, while Gastón Mazzacane drives for the Prost Grand Prix. In the American version, Luciano Burti drives for the Prost Grand Prix while Pedro de la Rosa drives for Jaguar Racing as they both did in real life from the Spanish Grand Prix.

== Reception ==
Reception

Aggregate scores
Aggregator	Score	
Aggregator	PS	PS2
GameRankings	70%	78%
Metacritic	N/A	73/100

Review scores
Publication	Score	
Publication	PS	PS2
Famitsu	N/A	27/40
Game Informer	N/A	8.5/10
GamePro	N/A	4/5
GamesMaster	N/A	91%
GameSpot	N/A	7.2/10
GameZone	N/A	7.1/10
IGN	N/A	7/10
Jeuxvideo.com	15/20	16/20
PlayStation Official Magazine – UK	N/A	8/10
Official U.S. PlayStation Magazine	N/A	2.5/5
BBC Sport	N/A	91%

The PlayStation 2 version of Formula One 2001 received "average" reviews according to the review aggregation website Metacritic. In Japan, Famitsu gave it a score of 27 out of 40.
