= Formula One 05 =

2005 video game

- Developer: Studio Liverpool
- Publisher: Sony Computer Entertainment
- Series: Formula One
- Platform: PlayStation 2
- Release: EU: 1 July 2005; JP: 22 September 2005
- Genre: Racing
- Modes: Single-player, multiplayer

Formula One 05 is a 2005 racing video game developed by Studio Liverpool and published by Sony Computer Entertainment for the PlayStation 2. It is a sequel to the 2004 video game Formula One 04 and was based on the 2005 Formula One World Championship.

== Gameplay ==
The game features the 'Career Mode' concept from Formula One 04, which allows players to work their way through the Formula One teams over the course of five years (albeit a repeat version of the 2005 Formula One World Championship each time). This game also supports EyeToy: Cameo, allowing players to place their own face on a driver when creating their profile, but unlike F1 04, they cannot choose their own helmet at the start. The players start with a white unmarked helmet and later unlock other colours and designs.

Players start out testing for smaller teams such as Minardi, Jordan and Red Bull Racing. Like in F1 04, a generic car does exist, but it is only used in Time Attack mode. Players then work their way up the grid throughout their 'career' through a mixture of good tests and impressive race performances. As before, consistently poor performances will lead to dismissal from the player's current team. There are also occasional 'shoot-out' tests against the team's second driver (or third driver, depending on the player's current status within the team), in which both drivers complete a set of five laps each and whoever has the fastest overall time (one time based on the fastest first, second and third sectors added together) then takes the race seat. Players can now also view trophies they have received from winning races and championships after each is won in Career Mode for the first time.

As with F1 04, "classic" cars (like the Williams FW11) are unlocked once certain terms are fulfilled, such as winning a World Championship. Helmets for Career Mode are also unlocked, and there is also a hidden track, in the form of the Detroit Street Circuit available for Time Attack Mode, although for copyright reasons is listed as 'Street Circuit'. There is also evidence that the Paul Ricard circuit was also meant to be included on Time Attack Mode, as proved by an oversight from the developers, where once the player unlocked the Street Circuit, the in-game laptop in the View Achievements section, would display the Paul Ricard Circuit instead of the Street Circuit. The circuit was removed from the final game, and any attempts to access the circuit, would lead to the game crashing on the loading screen. Notably, since this game was developed before the change in the qualifying regulations midway through the actual 2005 Formula One World Championship, this game runs the original "aggregated times" format from the early part of the actual 2005 Formula One World Championship in every race in Race Weekend, Championship and Career Mode. This game also had Net Play available. A notable credit is the opening video that features the song "Butterflies & Hurricanes" from English alternative rock band Muse.

A new feature for this game was "interactive" pit stops, in which the player had to control every element of the pit stop by pressing the relevant button when prompted, such as when to connect and disconnect the fuel rig and changing the tyres. The quicker these tasks were carried out, the faster the player would be able to rejoin the race. As tyre changes were banned in the 2005 season, tyres could only be replaced if a player needed to pit to repair damage.

The game features all the drivers and tracks from the 2005 Formula One World Championship, but does not represent the replacement drivers that featured in the real 2005 Formula One World Championship, therefore Vitantonio Liuzzi, Alexander Wurz, Ricardo Zonta, Anthony Davidson, Pedro de la Rosa, Robert Doornbos and Antônio Pizzonia are not featured.

== Reception ==
Reception

Aggregate score
Aggregator	Score
Metacritic	78/100

Review scores
Publication	Score
Computer and Video Games	8/10
Eurogamer	7/10
Famitsu	28/40
GamesMaster	83%
Jeuxvideo.com	13/20
Play	67%
PSM3	83%
The Sydney Morning Herald	4/5

The game received "generally favorable" reviews according to the review aggregation website Metacritic. In Japan, Famitsu gave it a score of all four sevens for a total of 28 out of 40.

The game was launched in the UK one week prior to the 2005 British Grand Prix. Models Michelle Marsh and Lucy Pinder act as the faces of the game. In order to promote the game, fans attending the race weekend were able to try and set the fastest possible lap time of Silverstone on a simulator. The fan who set the fastest overall lap would get to race against retired F1 driver Johnny Herbert on stage at the British Grand Prix after-party. Broadcaster Murray Walker provided live commentary of the head-to-head to approximately 30,000 spectators. The competition was won by 16 year old Lloyd Eveleigh who beat Herbert on stage in the head-to-head race.

Many players consider the game to be a massive improvement in the series. A lot of people criticized Studio Liverpool for the lack of ambition and progress since the series appeared on the PS2 platform up to that point. With the release of Formula One 05, people saw that great strides had been made by Studio Liverpool in terms of gameplay handling and AI.

However, there were criticisms in terms of the AI being too easy on the most difficult of settings, and about the penalty system that had been introduced on Formula One 05 which automatically reduced the revs during a penalty instead of the traditional "drive-through" penalties that previous games had seen. Overall though, the fans agreed that apart from these minor issues, Studio Liverpool had redeveloped the brand as a stepping stone for improvement for the inevitable release of the 2006 edition.

== Mistakes and errors ==
- On the select team mode, the Minardi drivers were pictured the wrong line-up: Christijan Albers was placed in the #20 car and Patrick Friesacher was placed in the #21 car.
- In Unlocked Tracks, in the View Achievements section, the in-game laptop displays the wrong footage for the Street Circuit, as it instead displays the Circuit Paul Ricard in France, which was originally meant to be included in Time Attack Mode, but was removed from the final game for unknown reasons.
