= Cirrus (band) =

American big beat group

- Origin: Los Angeles, California, United States
- Genres: Big beat, breakbeat, trip hop
- Years active: 1995–2003
- Label: Moonshine Music
- Past members: Aaron Carter; Stephen James Barry

Cirrus was an American electronic dance music group formed in 1995 in Los Angeles, California, United States. The group was composed of Aaron Carter and Stephen James Barry.

In live performances, the group often added live instrumentation such as guitar and bass to the electronic background. Their single "Superstar DJ" brought them mainstream exposure, and in 1997 they released their debut album on Moonshine Music. They scored several dance hits in the US and Canada over the next five years. The song, "Back on a Mission" is featured in the film Mortal Kombat 2: Annihilation and also appears in the video games, Need for Speed: Underground 2, Apocalypse, and "Demolition Racer".

== Members ==
- Aaron Carter - vocals, keyboards, guitar, production, mixing, programming
- Stephen James Barry - keyboards, bass, production, mixing, engineering

=== Live members ===
- Jim Chaney - drums
- Laura Derby - vocals (2002 only)
- Tyler Bates - guitars (2002 only)

== Discography ==
Counterfeit
Review scores
Source	Rating
URB	3/5 stars

=== Albums ===
- Drop the Break (Moonshine Music, 1997)
- Back on a Mission (Moonshine, 1998)
- Counterfeit (Moonshine, 2002)

=== Charting singles ===
- "Superstar DJ" (1996) US Dance/Club Play #26
- "Break In (Give us a Break)" (1997) US Dance/Club Play #30
- "Back on a Mission" (1998) US Dance/Club Play #14, US Dance Sales #17
- "Stop and Panic" (1999) US Dance/Club Play #11, Canada #12
- "Boomerang" (2002) US Dance/Club Play #10

== Songs in video games ==
- "Captain Cocktail" in Test Drive 6 and Supercar Street Challenge.
- "Time's Running Out" in Test Drive 6, Twisted Metal 4 and Supercar Street Challenge.
- "Break The Madness" in Demolition Racer and Demolition Racer: No Exit.
- "Stop & Panic" in Demolition Racer, Demolition Racer: No Exit, Need for Speed: High Stakes, ATV Offroad Fury, XGRA: Extreme-G Racing Association, and FIFA Football 2002.
- "Abba Zabba" in Demolition Racer and Demolition Racer: No Exit
- "Back on a Mission" in Need for Speed Underground 2, Apocalypse, Twisted Metal 4, and Cool Boarders 2001.
- "Nassau" in Supercar Street Challenge.
- "The Answer" in Demolition Racer and Demolition Racer: No Exit.
- "Back on a Mission" was featured and uncredited in the movie Mortal Kombat 2: Annihilation.
- "Breakbeat Suckers" in Downhill Domination.
- "Break In" in Gran Turismo 3
- "Hit the Decks" in XGRA: Extreme-G Racing Association

Mix

- Paul van Dyk – Nothing But You (Cirrus Mix) in Need for Speed: Underground 2
