= Destruction Derby 2 =

1996 vehicular combat video game

- Developer: Reflections Interactive
- Publisher: Psygnosis
- Platforms: MS-DOS, Windows, PlayStation
- Release: PlayStation: NA: 6 November 1996; EU: 18 January 1997; PC: NA: 21 November 1996; EU: 29 November 1996
- Genres: Vehicular combat, racing
- Modes: Single-player, multiplayer

Destruction Derby 2 is a 1996 vehicular combat racing video game developed by Reflections Interactive and published by Psygnosis for PlayStation and Microsoft Windows. The sequel to Destruction Derby (1995) and developed by the same team, players race with the goal of earning points by damaging opponent cars. Standard races and matches based in arenas with the goal of remaining the last player driving are also available.

Destruction Derby 2 is an overhaul of the original and features ideas that did not make it into the first game, including tracks that feature obstacles and improved realism. The car mechanics were also redesigned. Development was also focused on Americanisation: the game style shifted away from the British banger racing of the original, and the cars and music were changed to fit a NASCAR theme. The game features Paul Page as commentator, and the soundtrack was created by thrash metal bands Jug and Tuscan. Destruction Derby 2 was positively received, with reviewers praising the large tracks and car physics, though the PC version was criticised for its difficulty.

== Gameplay ==
A typical Destruction Derby match in progress

Destruction Derby 2 is the sequel to Destruction Derby. Like the original, players race on one of seven circuits in a range of modes. The modes are Wrecking Racing, in which the goal is to earn points by destroying or spinning the other competitors during the race; Stock Car, a typical race during which cars can still be damaged or destroyed; and Destruction Derby, based around the crash arenas instead of race tracks, in which the goal is to inflict as much damage as possible. A new feature called the pit stop was added to the race tracks, where cars can be repaired. Another major difference from the original game is track obstacles such as jumps and crossovers.

There are also four different game types: Championship, Race Practice, Time Trial, and Multi Player. In Championship, players compete in a league of seasons consisting of four races and, in Wrecking Racing, a Destruction Derby match. In Race Practice, players practise a race, while Time Trials consists of a race against the clock. Multi Player allows up to nine players to race individually. After all have finished, a league table showing their placings is displayed.

Destruction Derby 2 supports Namco's NeGcon controller.

== Development and release ==
The original Destruction Derby was developed in seven months, resulting in a few design flaws and the cutting of several ideas that could not be implemented within that time frame. According to producer Martin Edmondson, Destruction Derby 2 is a rewrite of the original, with only the 2D collision algorithms remaining intact. The engine was rewritten to handle the larger tracks incorporating obstacles such as hills and jumps, while the car dynamics were also redesigned. The collision routines were extended so cars can handle being flipped over. Edmondson stated that Destruction Derby 2 felt like a new game rather than merely a sequel with more tracks.

Edmondson wanted to Americanise the game, as the original had a British banger racing feel. Therefore, the cars were designed to resemble the stock cars used in NASCAR racing, while all the tracks were situated in the United States. Edmondson also wanted appropriate music for American stock car races, so he attended races across the United States, where he noticed that metal music featured prominently. Thrash metal bands Jug and Tuscan were therefore chosen to compose the soundtrack, as some members of the team were involved with them. Because soft-spoken commentary would not fit with the soundtrack, commentator Paul Page was asked to serve as the game's announcer due to his "animated and excitable" style. Edmondson travelled to the United States to record Page at a studio in Indianapolis.

Variety and realism were focuses for the tracks: they featured visuals such as forests, Neon Cities, and Canyons, complete with obstacles. The team travelled to photograph the textures. The tracks were constructed in Softimage 3D and converted to PlayStation format mesh data using a custom tool. In response to a common criticism of the original Destruction Derby, the tracks were designed to be larger and less narrow. The team were inspired by Daytona's revolving windmills, and large jumps were implemented to add drama to the tracks. The most realistic aspect of the race tracks was the pit stop, although Edmondson stated that he limited players to one stop because the team did not want to detract from the action and because a penalty system would have added a lot of extra work. Cars nearing destruction were designed to behave in a realistic and unpredictable fashion through effects such as losing the bonnet (hood) and catching on fire.

Wrecking Racing was meant to enable a broad range of strategies, such as keeping up but watching out for destruction opportunities, destroying the cars in front, and destroying everything without concern for position. This was hard to balance, but it proved possible to win with each of those strategies. Edmondson came up with Stock Car Racing after watching the Banger World Finals at Arena Essex and noticing that there were some cars simply racing rather than trying to destroy each other. The normal race mode was implemented simply because the engine could support running a traditional race. For Destruction Derby mode, more varied arenas were implemented to take advantage of a new physics system developed by Reflections. Edmondson decided against implementing features such as speed boosts and collectibles because he did not want the game to feel like an arcade game and wanted the car physics to be as realistic as possible. Additionally, a port to Sega Saturn was also in development but was not released. THQ, Psygnosis's North American distributor, had discontinued publishing for Saturn in 1997, although the Destruction Derby 2 port was canceled entirely before completion and hence not released anywhere.

Destruction Derby 2 was released on the PlayStation in North America in November 1996, and in Europe on 18 January 1997. A PC version soon followed. The PlayStation version was re-released in the Greatest Hits line on August 25, 1998. The next installment in the Destruction Derby series, excluding the Nintendo 64 exclusive Destruction Derby 64, was Destruction Derby Raw released in 2000.

== Reception ==
Reception

Review scores
Publication	Score
Computer Gaming World	2.5/5 (PC)
Computer and Video Games	4/5 (PS1)
Edge	8/10 (PS1)
Electronic Gaming Monthly	8.75/10 (PS1)
GameSpot	7.0/10 (PS1); 7.6/10 (PC)
IGN	7.2/10 (PS1)
Next Generation	4/5 (PS1)
The Electric Playground	9/10 (PS1)
Game Revolution	B+ (PS1)
Absolute PlayStation	8/10 (PS1)
Jeuxvideo.com	12/20 (PS1)
Gamezilla	80% (PS1); 40% (PC)
Coming Soon Magazine	4/5 (PS1); 83% (PC)
Gamer's Zone	3/5 (PC)
Official UK PlayStation Magazine	9/10 (PS1)
Génération 4	3/5 (PC)

The PlayStation version received positive reviews. Andrew Collins of the Official UK PlayStation Magazine believed the features are "massively improved" over the original, and said its "superbly polished" gameplay made it one of the best PlayStation racing games. His main criticism was that he thought the Destruction Derby Practice mode can make players complacent. The Electric Playground complimented the scenery and damage effects. Electronic Gaming Monthly's two sports reviewers praised the larger tracks and improved crashes, and both assessed it as "Better in every way than the first game". Johnny Ballgame of GamePro stated that "The original Destruction Derby looks like a mere hubcap compared to the gold-rimmed gameplay and trunkful of new features of Destruction Derby 2." He cited the longer tracks, arena mode, and light sourcing, but gave the game less than perfect scores as he found the announcer grating and judged the worsened steering after crashes to inordinately favor realism over enjoyment. Game Revolution described the Stock Car Racing as "almost perfect", and the tracks as "extremely cool", but criticised the steering sensitivity. Ed Lomag of Computer and Video Games lauded the improved car mechanics and track design and also liked that the UK PAL version runs in full screen at a full frame rate, thus proving British developers could make decent British PlayStation games. Despite these compliments, he criticised the game's limited re-playability. Edge praised the improved damage system resulting from the new physical modelling routines, saying the crashes are much more intense than the original. The 3D engine was described as "impressive", but the lack of a link-up multiplayer mode was criticised. Next Generation commented, "As with most ground-breaking titles ... Destruction Derby created as many new problems as solutions, and the developers of Destruction Derby 2 have done an extremely nice job of correcting these faults with a much improved sequel." The reviewer elaborated that the game's larger tracks than the original allow the player to both build up more momentum for crashes and enjoy more of a conventional racing challenge, and that the added ability for cars to leave the ground enables true 3D crashes. Absolute PlayStation described the game as a "vast improvement" over the original, but said the gameplay is identical and "rather shallow". Gamezilla's Mark Skorupa described the graphics as "top notch", but also said that it breaks what was good in the original game. IGN believed that the game compensates too much for the lack of difficulty of the first game through an overly aggressive artificial intelligence and by making it "impossible" to catch up with the other cars. Despite this, they praised the car physics and graphics. Jeff Kitts of GameSpot extensively praised the improved crashes and new tracks: "The winding, narrow, claustrophobic roadways of the first Destruction Derby have been replaced with huge, wide superspeedways worthy of games like NASCAR Racing and The Need for Speed." He remarked that the slippery road surfaces make the game more difficult to play, but considered it overall a major improvement over the first game. Jeuxvideo.com praised the playability of the game and the soundtrack, but criticised the commentary as "repetitive".

The PC version did not fare as well. Rick Broida of Computer Gaming World criticised the lack of multiplayer, the high system requirements, and the difficulty. Despite these criticisms, he complimented the improved graphics and tracks over the original. Sean Anderson of Gamezilla criticised the way the game handles multiplayer and described the commentator as "annoying". Frederick Claude of Coming Soon Magazine compared the PC version to the PlayStation version and believed the PC version's multiplayer support via DirectPlay to be an improvement over the PlayStation version's multiplayer. For the graphics, he described the PlayStation version as "far more beautiful" than the PC version and criticised the SVGA graphics mode for its high system requirements. Tim Soete of GameSpot described the PC version's graphics as an improvement over those of the original, but not as good as the PlayStation version. He also criticised the cars for being "impossible" to overtake. Craig Majaski of Gamer's Zone complimented the sound and music, describing them as "top-notch", but criticised the difficulty, saying the computer cars are "almost impossible" to beat. He described Destruction Derby 2 as "an average game that could have been an excellent title". Thierry Falcoz of Génération 4 said that Reflections made the mistake of sacrificing playability for "non-progressive" difficulty, which took pleasure from crashing into opponents away because they disappear "to the horizon" and are not seen again.

=== Sales ===
The game sold more than 1 million units.
