= Link cable =

Link cable may refer to:

- Game Link Cable
- GameCube – Game Boy Advance link cable
- PlayStation Link Cable
