= Formula One 06 =

2006 video game

- Developer(s): Studio Liverpool
- Publisher(s): Sony Computer Entertainment
- Series: Formula One
- Platform(s): PlayStation 2, PlayStation Portable
- Release: AU: 27 July 2006 (PS2); EU: 28 July 2006; JP: 28 December 2006
- Genre(s): Racing
- Mode(s): Single-player, multiplayer

Formula One 06 (also known as Formula One 2006 Portable for PlayStation Portable in Japan) is a racing video game developed by Studio Liverpool and published by Sony Computer Entertainment for the PlayStation 2 and PlayStation Portable. It is a sequel to the 2005 video game Formula One 05 and was based on the 2006 Formula One World Championship.

== Summary ==
The game continues the tradition of a career mode, an option in place since the 2004 game. Formula One 06 uses the previous F1 game engine but with minor modifications (team and driver select with team mode has a team logo). This is also the last game in the Formula One series to be released on the PlayStation 2 and PlayStation Portable.

In career mode, the players begin their career with either Super Aguri, Toro Rosso or Midland F1. They have a position within the team, as a test driver. As a second or first driver, it depends on how well the player performs during the trial sessions, and thereafter. The test sessions are either held at the Circuit de Catalunya, Silverstone or Magny-Cours circuits and can also be played out in either dry or wet conditions.

The game is based on the early 2006 Formula One World Championship. Hence, Yuji Ide drives for Super Aguri when in reality he lost his super licence just four races into the '06 Formula One World Championship, and Franck Montagny, then later Sakon Yamamoto took his seat. Other minor changes throughout the real 2006 Formula One World Championship are also not represented, therefore Pedro de la Rosa, Robert Kubica, Robert Doornbos, Franck Montagny and Sakon Yamamoto are not featured. Also, the Midland team are not re-branded as Spyker in later Grands Prix in the game.

The trial sessions vary from completing one "Flying Lap" to ten laps to beat the Target Time. Also, this target time can be an "Accumulative Target Time" where the player has four or three laps in which to consistently post fast times. The fastest laps are then added together and then compared to the Accumulative Target Time.

The player's career lasts a total of five Grand Prix seasons, in which they attempt to become a World Champion. This will most likely happen with the most competitive teams, e.g. Renault, Ferrari, McLaren or Honda.

In addition, certain prizes can be unlocked once certain criteria have been fulfilled, e.g. winning a grand prix, and unlocking an award such as the test track, Jerez. A trophy cabinet section is also featured so players can view the trophies they have won in different Grands Prix, or in the world championship. The F1 car that a player won the championship with is also displayed.

The game also features the new knockout qualifying system, introduced at the start of the 2006 Formula One World Championship, with three qualifying sessions. Other new additions include the formation lap and a much more competitive AI from previous F1 games in the series.

The game also features the V8 engine sound for the first time except for the Scuderia Toro Rosso STR1 V10 engine sound.

The new heavy damage system is also included with puncture, front-wing and nose damage. Rear wing damage and wheels off are included during gameplay.

Net Play was removed just before the release of the game. It was promised that for the first time the ability to race cross-platform would be possible, allowing PSP players to take on PS2 players, but this did not happen. Studio Liverpool cited time restraints as a reason for this. Also, due to time restraints, F1 07 was cancelled due to the release of Formula One Championship Edition for PlayStation 3.

=== Classic cars ===
A small selection of classic cars can be unlocked during gameplay, which can be driven in time trial mode. The classic cars available are:

| Year | Team | Car | Engine | Original drivers |
|---|---|---|---|---|
| 1950 | (Italy) Alfa Romeo | Alfa Romeo 158 | Alfa Romeo 1,479 cc straight-8 | Jean-Pierre Wimille, Giuseppe Farina, Juan Manuel Fangio, Luigi Fagioli |
| 1959 | (United Kingdom) Cooper Car Company | Cooper T51 | Climax FPF 2.5 L4 | Jack Brabham, Masten Gregory, Bruce McLaren, Giorgio Scarlatti |
| 1970 | (United Kingdom) Gold Leaf Team Lotus | Lotus 49C | Ford-Cosworth DFV 3.0 V8 | Emerson Fittipaldi, John Miles, Jochen Rindt, Alex Soler-Roig |
| 1973 | (United Kingdom) John Player Team Lotus | Lotus 72E | Ford-Cosworth DFV 3.0 V8 | Emerson Fittipaldi, Ronnie Peterson |
| 1978 | (United Kingdom) Williams Grand Prix Engineering | Williams FW06 | Ford-Cosworth DFV 3.0 V8 | Alan Jones, Clay Regazzoni |
| 1996 | (United Kingdom) Williams Grand Prix Engineering | Williams FW18 | Renault RS8/RS8B 3.0 litre V10 | Damon Hill, Jacques Villeneuve |

== Development ==
Formula One 06 was officially launched in London ahead of the 2006 British Grand Prix with model Keeley Hazell acting as the face of the game.

== Reception ==
Reception

Aggregate score
| Aggregator | Score | |
| Aggregator | PS2 | PSP |
|---|---|---|
| Metacritic | 66/100 | 71/100 |

Review scores
| Publication | Score | |
| Publication | PS2 | PSP |
|---|---|---|
| Eurogamer | N/A | 7/10 |
| Famitsu | 31/40 | 28/40 |
| GamesMaster | 73% | N/A |
| GamesTM | 4/10 | N/A |
| Jeuxvideo.com | 13/20 | N/A |
| PlayStation Official Magazine – UK | 7/10 | 7/10 |
| PALGN | 7/10 | N/A |
| Play | 73% | N/A |
| PSM3 | 72% | N/A |
| VideoGamer.com | 7/10 | 7/10 |

The game received "average" reviews on both platforms according to the review aggregation website Metacritic. In Japan, Famitsu gave it a score of 31 out of 40 for the PlayStation 2 version, and 28 out of 40 for the PSP version.
