= Kersploosh! =

2011 video game

- Developer: Poisoft
- Publishers: JP: Poisoft; NA/EU: Nintendo
- Director: Akihiro Nakagawa
- Producer: Hiroshi Ishikawa
- Designer: Masahiro Kitago
- Programmers: Akihiro Nakagawa; Hiroshi Ishikawa
- Composer: Tomoshige Komine
- Platform: Nintendo 3DS
- Release: JP: June 7, 2011; EU: February 28, 2013; NA: March 7, 2013
- Genres: Action, puzzle
- Mode: Single-player

Kersploosh!, known in Europe as Splash or Crash and in Japan as Hyu~Stone (Note: Japanese: ひゅ～ストン, Hepburn: Hyu~suton), is an action puzzle video game developed by Poisoft for the Nintendo 3DS. It was published by Nintendo outside of Japan, and was the first Poisoft game to be released internationally. Kersploosh! has the player control a selection of objects falling down a well, avoiding obstacles to reach the bottom of the well. It contains ten levels and ten objects to choose from, with the player attempting to reach the end of a stage for a high score.

The three developers at Poisoft wanted to design a game using the stereoscopic 3D of the 3DS to emphasize depth, creating a game where the 3D display enhances the depth of each well. The game was released on the Nintendo eShop in Japan on June 7, 2011, in Europe on February 28, 2013, and in North America on March 7, 2013. Kersploosh! received mixed reviews, with praise for its fun gameplay, presentation, and 3D effects, but was critiqued for its limited gameplay depth, short length, and lack of online features. A sequel, New Hyu~Stone (Note: Japanese: 新ひゅ～ストン, Hepburn: Shin Hyu~suton), was released on April 22, 2015 exclusively in Japan, which added new objects and levels.

== Gameplay ==
The player controlling a stone that falls down a well, avoiding obstacles such as wooden planks.

Kersploosh! is an action puzzle video game game based on the premise of what an object might see when it is thrown down a well. The goal of the game is to steer the player's chosen object to the bottom of the well as fast as possible without it breaking. The player can select various objects to throw down the well, including a stone, iron ball, bouncy ball, jewel, watermelon, and a matryoshka doll. There are ten objects in total, with some being unlockable. Each object has unique stats for speed, boost speed, and health points. The bouncy ball, unlocked from the start, has a slow falling speed with infinite durability, whereas the water droplet, the final object unlocked, has the fastest fall speed that breaks in one hit. Before each level begins, a cutscene plays featuring humans throwing the selected object down the well, giving exposition on why the object is being discarded. When falling down a well, the player can steer their object in order to avoid obstacles such as wooden planks, food, cannons, and other household objects. Some wells contain environmental hazards, with alternate paths containing different ways of reaching the bottom. Giant doughnuts can be passed through to give the object a speed boost, while balloons can be popped to recover health. Additionally, fake doughnuts appear as flat wooden platforms with no hole to pass through, stopping the player's descent. There are ten wells with their own high score leaderboards, and players are able to exchange their high scores via StreetPass.

== Development and release ==
Kersploosh! was the first game on Nintendo 3DS developed by Poisoft, as well as the first game they created in collaboration with Nintendo. It was also the first game Poisoft released outside of Japan. Producer Hiroshi Ishikawa and director Akihiro Nakagawa, Poisoft's CEO, served as the two programmers, with Masahiro Kitago as a designer. After receiving information about the 3DS, Poisoft set out to create a game that highlighted the system's stereoscopic 3D effect. Nakagawa originally proposed a design concept in the form of a fancy poem, asking the question of what is inside of a well. With this concept established, they created a racing game with the core theme of objects falling down a well, adding obstacles that accelerate and decelerate the player. The development team struggled implementing physics simulations when breaking objects while optimizing the game for the 3DS. Ishikawa and Nakagawa got into arguments over how the player should accelerate, opting away from using a button on the controller. Occasionally, the three-person development team couldn't agree on which features to include, but would eventually persist and find one person's idea to agree on. The techno soundtrack was composed by Tomoshige Komine, a frequent composer for Poisoft and Vocaloid producer who works under the pseudonym "UtataP".

In Japan, the game released alongside the launch of the Nintendo eShop on June 7, 2011. Poisoft were first contacted by Nintendo of Europe to translate the game overseas, but since the development team found translation difficult, Nintendo handled the distribution outside of Japan. The international releases were announced in a Nintendo Direct on February 14, 2013, two years after its initial launch. In Europe, Splash or Crash released on February 28, 2013, and in North America, Kersploosh! released on March 7, 2013. A sequel to Hyu~Stone titled New Hyu~Stone was released exclusively in Japan on April 22, 2015. Following the sequel's announcement, a Nintendo 3DS Theme for the first game was released on March 11, 2015, and a soundtrack CD was released digitally on March 25, 2015. The Hyu~Stone & Takeyariman Original Soundtrack contained thirteen songs from Poisoft's Hyu~Stone and Takeyariman, with the song titles being suggested by fans. Poisoft would later develop Vroom in the Night Sky, which would become their second video game to release internationally after Kersploosh!.

== Reception ==
Reception

Aggregate scores
Aggregator	Score
GameRankings	65.36%
Metacritic	62/100

Review scores
Publication	Score
Destructoid	7.5/10
Eurogamer	5/10
GameRevolution	7/10
GamesMaster	69%
Nintendo Life	8/10
Nintendo World Report	7/10; 4.5/10
Official Nintendo Magazine	66%
Pocket Gamer	6/10
Digital Spy	3/5
Multiplayer.it	7.2/10

Kersploosh! received mixed or average reviews according to the review aggregators Metacritic and GameRankings. In their summary, Multiplayer.it described it as the "quintessential eShop game" on 3DS for its fast pace and cheap price.

The core gameplay was considered to be enjoyable by multiple gaming journalists. Mike Mason of Nintendo Life praised it for its addictiveness, as the stages provided tense moments that were never frustratingly difficult, but were short enough to replayed endlessly. Chris Carter of Destructoid claimed Kersploosh! was "a very brief, fleeting, yet enjoyable experience" that was fun to replay. Other critics considered the replayability to be a strength, allowing the player to improve navigating stages and achieve new high scores, creating "a good on-the-go experience". Daniele Cucchiarelli of Eurogamer Italy thought the simple game design was executed well, claiming that attempting to beat each stage with the fastest objects "put[s] one's patience to the test". In contrast, Ben Lee of Digital Spy critiqued the amount of satisfaction present when gaining momentum, as he felt it was often overshadowed by the struggle to complete each level and properly learn their layouts. Both Mike Mason of Nintendo Life and Mike Rose of Pocket Gamer complimented the variety of objects, as each one provided a new gameplay experience. Jamie Love of Siliconera thought the variety of obstacles "range from sensible to bizarre", but claimed "the differences between each well are very subtle". The sensitivity of the controller's analog stick when moving the player-controlled objects was initially described as challenging for new players to get accustomed to. Tsukui Kazuhito writing for Inside Games described the controls as simultaneously satisfying and frustrating. Curtis Bonds of Nintendo World Report claimed the analog stick was "too sensitive to play properly", preferring it had controls that use the touchscreen instead.

Many critics believed Kersploosh! lacked depth in its content, with Matthew Castle of GamesMaster believing "the core idea is perhaps a bit too basic". Daniele Cucchiarelli of Eurogamer Italy claimed "the quantity and quality of content offered" was its biggest issue, with a lack of incentive to replay the ten levels, and a short collective playtime of about half an hour. Other media outlets similarly reported that unlocking all of the content took around thirty minutes, resulting in a short gameplay experience. Mike Rose of Pocket Gamer elaborated that the short length allowed for each level to be replayed multiple times after, but complained that the core gameplay relies too heavily on memorizing the stage layouts with occasionally unfair obstacles. Additionally, Daniel Bischoff of GameRevolution questioned why they were forced to exit each stage and return to the main menu, wishing for the ability to progress through a menu option. The short story scenarios introducing the objects thrown down wells were enjoyed by critics. Mike Mason of Nintendo Life described them as "lighthearted and amusing", with the option to be skipped if the player desires, whereas Engadget enjoyed them to the extent of "playing…for the story, except there's not really a story". The main critique for these stage intros was the lack of additional scenarios, each object only having one story, leading to repetition.

Critics praised the presentation, describing the visuals as colorful and varied. Chris Carter of Destructoid claimed "the graphical style lends itself very well to a game predominately about imagination", and Mike Rose of Pocket Gamer appreciated how it "doesn't take itself very seriously" due to the silliness in its obstacles. Ben Lee of Digital Spy wrote that the well environments provide variety in visual design, with the stereoscopic 3D adding to their perceived depth. The soundtrack was met with mixed reception. Mike Mason of Nintendo Life claimed the few songs were all "pitched perfectly", fitting to the areas in which they are heard, with Daniel Bischoff of GameRevolution referring to the soundtrack as light and exciting. Conversely, critics believed the soundtrack was too limited, with a single song repeated for each well. Nintendo World Report writers Daan Koopman and Curtis Bonds thought there should have been more songs that players could listen to for added variety. Most critics believed the implementation of stereoscopic 3D effects was handled very well. Michele Lamberti of Multiplayer.it considered it "one of the best uses of stereoscopy" for an eShop game, and Mason similarly thought it featured "some of the best stereoscopic 3D on 3DS". At its worst, Chris Schilling writing for Official Nintendo Magazine UK considered it "a little too potent", and according to Curtis Bonds, the effect could be distracting. The inability to share leaderboards for stages online was considered a poor decision. Mike Rose of Pocket Gamer stated that an unwritten rule of gaming was how leaderboards need to be accessible online, while Daan Koopman of Nintendo World Report claimed the ability to share scores through StreetPass did not solve the issue of not being able to share scores with friends. Critics thought the price was justified for being a cheap Nintendo eShop title, however, Daniele Cucchiarelli of Eurogamer Italy and Daniel Bischoff of GameRevolution believed it would be a better value at a lower cost on iOS and Android. In comparison to Poisoft's Vroom in the Night Sky, Chris Carter of CGMagazine claimed Kersploosh! was one of their favorite 3DS games, and was surprised both games were made by the same developer.

At launch, the game was among the top-selling Nintendo eShop games in the United States. In 2011, it was the sixth best-selling Nintendo eShop game in Japan overall. Following a sale on Poisoft titles in Japan, it was among the best-selling 3DS eShop games in April 2015.

== Sequel ==
New Hyu~Stone, was a follow-up to the original released in Japan on April 22, 2015. The game was announced at the Poisoft Conference 2015 Spring on February 27, 2015 through the website Niconico. It featured more objects to use and multiple new wells to play, 26 objects and 43 wells in total. The amount of rankings saved to the system have been expanded, and the player can set a favorite object for each stage so they can decide what StreetPass data is sent to other users. Additionally, a new option to adjust the stereoscopic 3D vision has been added, and the levels are selected on a world map screen. By successfully completing all of the new wells, the player can play a secret well recreated from the previous game. From July 9—July 10, New Hyu~Stone was presented as a Nintendo indie game at the fourth BitSummit event. Time Attack tournaments for the game were also held in celebration of Poisoft's 8th anniversary. New Hyu~Stone received similarly mixed or average reviews according to Famitsu. Tsukui Kazuhito of Inside Games described it as a simple game with great use of the 3D effect, praising the compositions of Tomoshige Komine. Nagayoshi Hidetaka of Inside Games similarly praised the soundtrack, claiming they conveyed a thrilling sense of speed that complimented the addictive gameplay. The game debuted at the fifteenth position on the Japanese eShop sales charts, and remained among the best-selling games for five consecutive weeks.
