= Studio 33 =

British video game developer

- Type: Subsidiary
- Industry: Video games
- Founded: 1996; 30 years ago
- Founder: John White
- Defunct: 2006
- Fate: Dissolved
- Parent: Electronic Arts (2003–2006)

Studio 33 was a game developer from Liverpool, UK. It was once partly owned by Psygnosis, making Newman-Haas Racing, Formula One 99, Formula One 2000, Formula One 2001, Formula One Arcade and Destruction Derby Raw for the PlayStation, and Destruction Derby Arenas for PlayStation 2.

== History ==
In 1993, SCEE (then known as Sony Electronic Publishing) bought out Psygnosis, and Studio 33 was formed by John White, ex Director of Development from 1996 to October 16, 2003.

The studio was initially funded by Psygnosis, and its first title was Newman-Haas Racing, using the engine Bizarre Creations built for Formula 1. The company followed it up with Formula One 99, which was a bestseller that allowed Studio 33 to continue developing titles.

The company continued developing Formula One games for the original PlayStation, ending in Formula One Arcade. The company also developed Destruction Derby Raw, taking over from Reflections, whose studio has just been acquired by GT Interactive Software. The last game Studio 33 worked on before being sold to EA was Destruction Derby Arenas, the company's only PlayStation 2 game.

EA bought out Studio 33. EA relocated the studio to Warrington and renamed it EA North West. The studio was inactive since 2004 and got quietly shut down in 2006.

== Games ==
Year	Title	Publisher	Platform
1998	Newman-Haas Racing	Psygnosis	PlayStation
1999	Formula One 99	Psygnosis	PlayStation
2000	Formula One 2000	Sony Computer Entertainment Europe (Europe); Midway Home Entertainment (North America)	PlayStation
2000	Destruction Derby Raw	Sony Computer Entertainment Europe (Europe); Midway Home Entertainment (North America)	PlayStation
2001	Formula One 2001	Sony Computer Entertainment Europe	PlayStation
2002	Formula One Arcade	Sony Computer Entertainment Europe	PlayStation
2004	Destruction Derby Arenas	Sony Computer Entertainment Europe (Europe); Gathering of Developers (North America)	PlayStation 2
