= Andretti Racing =

1996 video game

- North American box art
- Developers: High Score Productions; Stormfront Studios; Press Start Inc. (Saturn)
- Publisher: EA Sports
- Platforms: PlayStation; Sega Saturn; Microsoft Windows
- Release: PlayStation: NA: 6 September 1996; EU: October 1996; Saturn: NA: 20 December 1996; PAL: 7 February 1997; Windows: EU: 1997; NA: 18 November 1997
- Genre: Racing
- Modes: Single-player, multiplayer

Andretti Racing is a racing video game developed by High Score Productions and Stormfront Studios and published by EA Sports for the PlayStation and Sega Saturn in 1996, and for Windows in 1997. The game's title refers to professional racing drivers Mario Andretti and Michael Andretti.

== Gameplay ==
Screenshot of Andretti Racing on Sega Saturn

The PlayStation version also allows split screen multiplayer with up to four players using the Link Cable, the first game allowing up to four humans to play using that cable.

== Reception ==
Reception

Review scores
| Publication | Score | | |
| Publication | PC | PS | Saturn |
|---|---|---|---|
| CNET Gamecenter | 8/10 | N/A | 8/10 |
| Computer Games Strategy Plus | 2.5/5 | N/A | N/A |
| Computer Gaming World | 3/5 | N/A | N/A |
| Edge | N/A | 7/10 | N/A |
| Electronic Gaming Monthly | N/A | 7.75/10 | 8.75/10 |
| Famitsu | N/A | 22/40 | N/A |
| Game Informer | N/A | 8.75/10 | 8.75/10 |
| GameRevolution | N/A | B+ | N/A |
| GameSpot | 7.3/10 | 6.6/10 | N/A |
| IGN | N/A | 8/10 | 8/10 |
| Next Generation | 4/5 | 4/5 | N/A |
| PC Gamer (US) | 84% | N/A | N/A |
| PC Zone | 73% | N/A | N/A |
| Sega Saturn Magazine | N/A | N/A | 83% |

The PC and Saturn versions received favorable reviews, while the PlayStation version received mixed reviews. Game Informer gave the PlayStation version a very favorable review, about two months before it was released Stateside. In Japan, where the same PlayStation version was ported and published by Electronic Arts Victor on 28 March 1997, Famitsu gave it a score of 22 out of 40.

Reviewing the PlayStation version in an early review, the two sports reviewers of Electronic Gaming Monthly praised the accurate racing, four-player compatibility, animation, and controls. Air Hendrix wrote in GamePro that the graphics are below-average for the PlayStation and the game lacks a good sense of speed, but the outstanding controls and "enjoyably deep, addictive gameplay that challenges far more than your twitch steering skills" outweigh these flaws. (Note: GamePro gave the PlayStation version 3.5/5 for graphics, 4/5 for sound, 5/5 for control, and 4.5/5 for fun factor.) A reviewer for Next Generation was more pleased with the graphics, commenting that "Andretti Racing doesn't match the richness and detail of Psygnosis's Formula 1, but it can be considered one of the better looking racing games in recent memory. A challenging computer AI, well-balanced control system, and two-player split-screen mode round out this deep title." He also praised it for having far more tracks and replay value than the arcade ports which were then the staple of console racing games.

Johnny Ballgame of GamePro compared the graphics of the Saturn version unfavorably to both the PlayStation version and contemporary Saturn racer Daytona USA: Championship Circuit Edition, but found that the responsive controls, wide selection of tracks, numerous features, and realistic sounds made the game extremely fun to play. He concluded, "Saturn owners who are looking to buy one racing game this year, look no further." (Note: GamePro gave the Saturn version 3/5 for graphics, 4/5 for sound, and two 4.5/5 scores for control and fun factor.) Lee Nutter of Sega Saturn Magazine also found the large number of tracks and features impressive, but described the track designs as "dull and indistinguishable from one another." Additionally criticizing the weak sense of speed, occasional graphic glitches, lack of detail in the cars, and poor PAL conversion, he concluded that "Andretti Racing does remain very playable with the various options and huge amount of tracks providing a very lengthy challenge but it seems to be a victory for quantity over quality." Electronic Gaming Monthly's sports reviewers found the graphics of the Saturn version to be unexceptional but solid, and highly praised the numerous options, licensing, responsive controls, and overall realism. Dean Hager went so far as to call it "the best true 32-bit racing simulation on the market."

Next Generation said of the PC version, "If you're looking for strict realism, stick with the Papyrus line of racers. Otherwise, Andretti Racing is a well-designed, extremely fun racing game that skirts the line between arcade and sim."

The same PC version was nominated for the "Best Sim Game" award at the CNET Gamecenter Awards for 1997, which went to Jane's Longbow 2.

The game sold more than 200,000 copies.
