= D platform =

D platform or D Body may refer to:

- Imperial (automobile), 1957–1973
- Chrysler D platform, 1990-1998
- Chrysler D platform (RWD)
- General Motors D platform
- Renault–Nissan D platform
- Volkswagen Group D platform
