= Formula One 99 =

1999 video game

- Cover art featuring from left to right: Jean Alesi, Michael Schumacher and Mika Häkkinen
- Developer: Studio 33
- Publisher: Psygnosis: EU/JP: Sony Computer Entertainment (PS)
- Series: Formula One
- Platforms: PlayStation, Microsoft Windows
- Release: PlayStation: JP: 21 October 1999; EU: 29 October 1999; NA: 16 December 1999; Microsoft Windows: EU: 10 December 1999; NA: 1999
- Genre: Racing
- Modes: Single-player, multiplayer

Formula One 99 is a racing video game developed by Studio 33 and published by Psygnosis for PlayStation and Microsoft Windows. Sony Computer Entertainment released the game in Europe on the PlayStation. It is the sequel to the 1998 video game Formula 1 98 and was based on the 1999 Formula One World Championship.

Following the disappointment of Formula 1 98, and the subsequent split with Visual Science, Psygnosis hired Studio 33 to develop Formula One 99, after their successful development of Newman/Haas Racing the previous year. During production of the game, Sony Computer Entertainment acquired Psygnosis, making this the final Formula One game to be released by Psygnosis independently.

The game is unique in having substitute drivers appear in the game as they did in the real 1999 season (such as Mika Salo replacing Michael Schumacher for the races between Austria and Europe). A new grid editor tool was also introduced, allowing players to customise the starting grid to their own liking before a race. Despite the lack of an arcade mode that had featured in previous titles, the game was widely praised as an overwhelming improvement in comparison to the 1998 game.

== Reception ==
Reception

Aggregate score
| Aggregator | Score |
|---|---|
| GameRankings | PS: 78% |

Review scores
| Publication | Score |
|---|---|
| Edge | PS: 7/10 |
| Famitsu | PS: 28/40 |
| Game Informer | PS: 7.75/10 |
| GameFan | PS: 65% |
| GamePro | PS: 4/5 |
| GameSpot | PS: 7.7/10 |
| IGN | PC: 4.2/10; PS: 8.5/10 |
| PlayStation Official Magazine – Australia | PS: 8/10 |
| PlayStation Official Magazine – UK | PS: 8/10 |
| Official U.S. PlayStation Magazine | PS: 3.5/5 |
| PC Accelerator | PC: 5/10 |
| PC Gamer (US) | PC: 40% |
| Gamers' Republic | PS: B+ |

The PlayStation version received "favorable" reviews according to the review aggregation website GameRankings. Official UK PlayStation Magazine said that the game "put the series back on track after last year's debacle", with top gameplay and a true sense of speed. GameSpot praised the controls and grid editor tool. IGN called it the best F1 game for PlayStation. In Japan, where the PlayStation version was ported and published by Sony Computer Entertainment on October 21, 1999, Famitsu gave it a score of 28 out of 40.
