= CART World Series =

1997 video game

- CART World Series NTSC cover
- Developer: Sony Interactive Studios America
- Publisher: Sony Computer Entertainment
- Platform: PlayStation
- Release: NA: October 1997
- Genre: Arcade racing
- Modes: Single player, multiplayer

CART World Series is a 1997 racing video game developed by Sony Interactive Studios America and published by Sony Computer Entertainment for the PlayStation. It is based on the Championship Auto Racing Teams (CART) open-wheel racing series.

== Gameplay ==
This game is licensed and features many notable drivers from the late 1990s, such as Greg Moore, Al Unser Jr. and Paul Tracy. The game also features realistic handling and damage. Players can compete in a full year's worth of races competing for points in each race or in simple single races. There are two game modes: arcade and simulation. Arcade mode allows re-spawning of damaged vehicle parts. In Simulation mode, all damage is permanent for the race. The game supports the analog controller.

The player can make many modifications to a car's performance. The player can adjust the tires to fit the road (hard for ovals or soft for road courses), as well as modify gear ratios and aerodynamics. Moving the front of the car down or slanting the wings may enable the player to find a perfect combination of speed and handling. During simulation mode races, the car's tires will wear down and fuel will deplete (both can be replaced by a pit stop).

In addition to the real drivers and cars (Honda and Ford included), ten official CART tracks have been included, each modeled after its real-life counterpart. Tracks span the United States and are located in Cleveland, Michigan, Long Beach and more. Each features realistic dynamics and road handling in an attempt to create a believable racing experience. In Season Mode, the player takes part in a series of races, for which the player must qualify and race, earning points toward a cup.

This game also features a two-player mode via either split screen or PlayStation Link Cable, or a combination of both for four players.

== Reception ==
Reception

Aggregate score
Aggregator	Score
GameRankings	71% (6 reviews)

Review scores
Publication	Score
Electronic Gaming Monthly	6.625/10
IGN	7/10

The game received primarily mixed reviews. Critics widely praised the graphics of both the car models and the detailed tracks, as well as the extensive CART licensed content. However, some criticized the music and reaction to the controls was divided. Sushi-X of Electronic Gaming Monthly found them not responsive enough, and Jaz Rignall commented in IGN that the way the car sticks firmly to the road, preventing the powerslides that racing game fans are accustomed to, is frustrating. Contrarily, GamePro stated that "the effective car setup options and responsive handling keep you on the track."

Sushi-X's co-reviewers Kraig Kujawa and John Ricciardi both recommended CART World Series, with Kujawa remarking that it "strikes a careful balance between realism and fun". However, most critics, including the other two members of Electronic Gaming Monthly's review team, concluded that while it was a decent game on its own terms, it did not hold up well against other games in the crowded PlayStation racing game market of the time. GamePro, for example, opined that "For sport racing fans, CART ranks third this season - NASCAR '98 has better balance, while F1 Championship Edition has deeper sim play."
