= Poisoft =

Japanese video game publisher and developer

POI SOFT Co., Ltd.
- Native name: 株式会社ポイソフト
- Romanized name: Kabushiki gaisha Poisofuto
- Type: Kabushiki gaisha
- Industry: Video games
- Founded: June 23, 2008; 18 years ago
- Headquarters: Fukuoka City, Fukuoka Prefecture, Japan
- Products: Console games
- Number of employees: 3 (2022)
- Website: www.poisoft.jp

POI SOFT Co., Ltd. is a Japanese game developer and publisher based in Fukuoka, Japan.

The company consists of only three members, who specialize in developing downloadable games for Nintendo systems such as the Wii, Nintendo 3DS and the Nintendo Switch. Their first title to be released internationally was Kersploosh!, published by Nintendo on the 3DS, originally being a launch game for the Nintendo eShop in Japan. The company is known for the Nintendo Switch launch title Vroom in the Night Sky, which received universally negative reviews from critics.

== Games developed by Poisoft ==
=== Wii ===
Title	Original release date	Publisher(s)	JP	NA	EU	AUS
ORDER!	JP: June 2, 2009	JP: Poisoft	Yes	No	No	No
Boku mo Sekai o Sukuitai	JP: June 29, 2010	JP: Poisoft	Yes	No	No	No
Boku mo Sekai o Sukuitai: BATTLE TOURNAMENT	JP: November 2, 2010	JP: Poisoft	Yes	No	No	No

=== Nintendo 3DS ===
Title	Original release date	Publisher(s)	JP	NA	EU	AUS
Kersploosh! (JP: Hyu~ Stone, EU: Splash or Crash)	JP: June 7, 2011; EU: February 28, 2013; NA: March 7, 2013	JP: Poisoft; WW: Nintendo	Yes	Yes	Yes	No
TakeyariMan	JP: November 2, 2011	JP: Poisoft	Yes	No	No	No
Yoru no Majin to Ikusa no Kuni ~Samayoeru Vampire~	JP: May 30, 2012	JP: Poisoft	Yes	No	No	No
Mansion Percussion	JP: March 6, 2013	JP: Poisoft	Yes	No	No	No
ORDER LAND!	JP: December 11, 2013	JP: Poisoft	Yes	No	No	No
Sangoku Stories Ten	JP: January 14, 2015	JP: Poisoft	Yes	No	No	No
Shin Hyu~Stone	JP: April 22, 2015	JP: Poisoft	Yes	No	No	No
Monokage Quest	JP: August 26, 2015	JP: Poisoft	Yes	No	No	No
Gakuyuu Unmeikyoudoutai: Friends in the Same RPG	JP: January 20, 2016	JP: Poisoft	Yes	No	No	No
Nyanyanto Mori	JP: August 31, 2016	JP: Poisoft	Yes	No	No	No
Boku wa Ousama to Yuusha	JP: TBA	JP: Poisoft	Yes	No	No	No

=== Nintendo Switch ===
Title	Original release date	Publisher(s)	JP	NA	EU	AUS
Vroom in the Night Sky (JP: Soratobu Bunbun Burn)	JP: March 3, 2017; PAL: March 3, 2017; NA: April 5, 2017	WW: Poisoft	Yes	Yes	Yes	Yes
ORDER LAND!	JP: September 28, 2017	JP: Poisoft	Yes	No	No	No
Poisoft Thud Card (JP: Poisoft no Zun ～Atsui Toranpu～)	WW: March 1, 2018	WW: Poisoft	Yes	Yes	Yes	Yes
