= Formula 1 97 =

1997 video game

- European PlayStation box art
- Developer: Bizarre Creations
- Publisher: Psygnosis
- Series: Formula One
- Platforms: PlayStation, Windows
- Release: PlayStation: EU: 26 September 1997; NA: 30 September 1997; Windows: NA: 17 June 1998; EU: 1998
- Genre: Racing
- Modes: Single-player, multiplayer

Formula 1 97 (known as Formula 1 Championship Edition in North America) is a 1997 racing video game developed by Bizarre Creations and published by Psygnosis for the PlayStation and Microsoft Windows. It is the sequel to the 1996 game Formula 1 and was based on the 1997 Formula One World Championship. This was the last Formula One game to be made by Bizarre Creations, who moved on to create the successful Metropolis Street Racer for the Dreamcast and Project Gotham Racing for the Xbox; development would move on to Visual Science and eventually Studio 33.

== Gameplay ==
Formula 1 97 includes all the tracks from the 1997 season, including the cancelled Portuguese Grand Prix circuit. All drivers are included, with the exception of Williams F1 driver Jacques Villeneuve, who declined to license his name, and the MasterCard Lola duo of Ricardo Rosset and Vincenzo Sospiri, whose team folded after failing to qualify for the opening race of the season.

The game includes a Grand Prix mode, which was designed to be technical and realistic, and an arcade mode, which was aimed towards a broader audience.

Formula 1 97 supports two-player racing through a split screen.

== Development ==
Formula 1 97 was developed by Bizarre Creations and published by Psygnosis. It uses the same game engine as the original Formula 1. Psygnosis contacted ITV commentator Murray Walker and arranged a meeting with Bizarre Creations employees. Walker became impressed with development and signed an exclusive agreement with Psygnosis to record English-language commentary for a further two years.

Shortly after the initial release, Psygnosis announced that due to a licensing disagreement with the Fédération Internationale de l'Automobile, Formula One Administration Ltd, and Giss Licensing BV, Formula 1 97 would be repackaged and re-released with a different title and without the official Formula One logos.

== Reception ==
Reception

Review scores
Publication	Score
Electronic Gaming Monthly	8.25/10 (PS1)
GameSpot	7.9/10 (PS1)
IGN	9/10 (PS1)
PlayStation Official Magazine – UK	9/10
PC PowerPlay	77% (PC)

Formula 1 97 was a best-seller in the UK. In August 1998, the game's PlayStation version received a "Platinum" sales award from the Verband der Unterhaltungssoftware Deutschland (VUD), indicating sales of at least 200,000 units across Germany, Austria and Switzerland.

Reviews for Formula 1 97 were overwhelmingly positive. IGN stated the game is a "significant jump" from Formula 1. GameSpot said "Formula 1 CE is so much more than a racing game. It is a world-class simulation that offers such depth of gameplay, you'll think most other racing games are just Pole Position with a better graphics engine." Critics widely applauded the comprehensive Formula 1 licensing, numerous car setup options, realistic sound effects, and overall authentic Formula 1 feel. At the same time, the majority were enthusiastic about the arcade mode, saying it both opens the game up to players other than simulation fanatics and offers simulation fanatics a more relaxed way of enjoying the game. GamePro dissented on this point, contending that the arcade mode's "power-slide-heavy style feels almost silly and lacks the oomph to attract arcade gamers."

Critics laid the most praise on the controls in the Grand Prix mode, commenting that they are maximally accurate, realistic, and challenging yet fair and rewarding. GamePro summed up, "If you have the skills, they come shining through, but rookies will have a tough time staying on the track." Most critics were also highly satisfied with the varied A.I. displayed by different drivers, saying it makes racing unpredictable and forces the player to pay close attention and continuously adjust their strategy rather than relying on a single method of overcoming opponents.

Most critics also praised the detailed graphics. While they also noted a good deal of pop-up, GameSpot argued this was a necessary trade-off for the game's combination of high detail and absence of slowdown, and Kelly Rickards argued in Electronic Gaming Monthly, "Ironically, [the pop-up] adds realism as it's difficult to see far away in a real F1 car at speed."

Official UK PlayStation Magazine said it was a big improvement in every regard over the previous game, and that the "graphics engine is faster, running at 25 fps, even with a dozen cars on the screen. The increased detail is most apparent in Grand Prix mode. All the cars are now fully deformable, and stray bits of debris stay on the track. Prepare to be stunned."

== Impact ==
The game impact transcended gaming and onto the actual sport itself. The game was seen as so accurate that actual Grand Prix drivers requested copies to practice with and major European television networks routinely used the game to enhance Formula One broadcasts.

== Legal issues ==
The game was hit by legal wranglings with the FIA (Formula One's governing body) objecting to the use of the FIA logo on the game's packaging. The game was withdrawn from shops six weeks after its release. It was re-released without the offending logo, but the FIA were still unhappy. However, the FIA lost the court case, and the game continued to be sold without the logo. Another problem faced was the use of the name and image of then-Williams F1-driver Jacques Villeneuve, after he had copyrighted both. The game shows a silhouette for the driver's image. Murray Walker refers to him as "Williams Numberone" or "The Canadian", however on the game menu, they list him as Driverone Williams; this problem is easily sidestepped by the addition of a driver name edit function. The game also has unused voice clips for Jacques Villeneuve, that can be found via hacking methods. This idea proved popular and re-appeared in Formula 1 98, but was not used for any of the following games. The driver name edit function is also used to enter codes to unlock the Aida, Adelaide, Silverstone (1960s look), a mirrored version of the original game's bonus track, and others, such as raining frogs and the cars having the ability to hover.

All alcohol and tobacco sponsors are censored, for example trackside adverts saying Faster instead of Fosters, since such advertisements were illegal in some countries.
