= Formula One 2000 (video game) =

2000 video game

- Developers: Studio 33 (PS); Tarantula Studios (GBC)
- Publishers: PlayStation: NA: Midway Games; EU: Sony Computer Entertainment; Game Boy Color: NA: Take-Two Interactive
- Series: Formula One
- Platforms: PlayStation, Game Boy Color
- Release: PlayStation: NA: 4 October 2000; EU: 6 October 2000; Game Boy Color: NA: 18 December 2000
- Genre: Racing
- Modes: Single-player, multiplayer

Formula One 2000 is a 2000 racing video game developed by Studio 33 and published by Sony Computer Entertainment for the PlayStation. It is an installment in Psygnosis' Formula One series, with a Game Boy Color version developed by Tarantula Studios released under license by Take-Two Interactive. It is a sequel to the 1999 video game Formula One 99 and is based on the 2000 Formula One World Championship.

== Gameplay ==
Formula One 2000 features 17 Grand Prix circuits, and a new "arcade" mode. This arcade mode is more similar in style to Wipeout: tracks are grouped into "location zones" with futuristic-sounding names and cars are grouped into series. The players begin on the easier courses with the worst cars, before unlocking the more difficult courses and the better cars. Bonus images can be unlocked as an incentive to win races. It also features the new Indianapolis Motor Speedway.

Strangely, despite Monza's layout being modified for 2000, its previous layout is still used.
