= Destruction Derby Raw =

2000 video game

- European cover art
- Developer: Studio 33
- Publishers: EU: Sony Computer Entertainment; NA: Midway Games
- Producer: Emma Greenfield
- Designers: Lee Wagner; Sandra Connor
- Programmer: Nick Koufou
- Platform: PlayStation
- Release: EU: 30 June 2000; NA: 27 September 2000
- Genres: Vehicular combat, racing
- Modes: Single-player, multiplayer

Destruction Derby Raw is a 2000 racing video game developed by Studio 33 and published by Sony Computer Entertainment for the PlayStation. it is the third main installment in Psygnosis's Destruction Derby series following Destruction Derby 2 (1996), and fourth overall after the Nintendo 64 exclusive Destruction Derby 64 (1999).

== Gameplay ==
Gameplay screenshot

The game continues the general theme of Destruction Derby. The collision system has been reworked and there are more damage allocation areas. A new career mode allows the player to win money and use it to upgrade their car. There are a total of 25 race tracks as well as three bowls and three skyscraper roofs, and 24 cars. The Skyscraper mode is a classic demolition derby event that takes place on top of towers, with the player aiming to shove opponents off.

== Development and release ==
IGN reported in December 1998 that a new game in the series is "definitely" under development. Psygnosis confirmed the game as Destruction Derby 3 on May 6, 1999. Reflections Interactive, which had developed the previous Destruction Derby titles on PlayStation, had ended their relationship with Psygnosis when purchased by GT Interactive. Some of the developing team from Reflections had joined Accolade (later acquired by Infogrames) and had developed a similar rival game, Demolition Racer.

The game was initially expected for a spring 2000 release. Early images depicted a more colorfully vibrant theme and vehicle designs closer to Destruction Derby 2 than the final version.

Destruction Derby Raw was picked up by Midway Games for its North American release. It was later added to the PlayStation Platinum Range on 15 February 2002.

== Reception ==
Reception

Aggregate score
Aggregator	Score
Metacritic	69/100

Review scores
Publication	Score
CNET Gamecenter	4/10
Electronic Gaming Monthly	7.33/10 (Note: Three critics of Electronic Gaming Monthly gave the game each a score of 8/10, 7.5/10, and 6.5/10.)
Game Informer	7.5/10
GameFan	53% (Note: In GameFan's viewpoint of the game, two critics gave it each a score of 58, and the other gave it 43.) (MVS) 50%
GamePro	3.5/5
GameRevolution	B
GameSpot	7.5/10
IGN	7.9/10
Jeuxvideo.com	17/20
Next Generation	2/5
Official U.S. PlayStation Magazine	4/5

The game received "average" reviews according to the review aggregation website Metacritic. Chet Barber of NextGen, however, said that the game was "exactly the same as the first two in the series, but with some new problems included."

Doug Perry of IGN concluded that "Having played a substantial amount of Destruction Derby 1 and 2, I have to say that on many levels this game is better, and more well-rounded.", adding that Destruction Derby Raw is "simply a different game. It still has the name, but it's different in feel, look, and most of all in the gameplay."
