= Cosmic Race =

1995 video game

Cosmic Race ~for the locked up planet~
- Developer: Neorex
- Publisher: Neorex
- Director: Masato Furuta
- Producer: Toshiyuki Komai
- Designer: Eijiro Kito
- Programmers: Eiji Kamiya; Masaki Nishibu; Shiro Shamoto
- Artists: Kazunari Hasegawa; Muneyuki Ichihara; Shigehisa Okada
- Writer: Kenji Nakamura
- Composer: Hurry Mind
- Platform: PlayStation
- Release: JP: 20 January 1995
- Genre: Racing
- Modes: Single-player, multiplayer

Cosmic Race (Note: Japanese: コズミック レース, Hepburn: Kozumikku Rēsu) is a spaceship-themed racing video game for the PlayStation. It was developed by Neorex (the company's only game) and was released exclusively in Japan in January 1995 as one of the console's first titles. Cosmic Race is notable for its largely negative critical reception with common complaints relating to its presentation, controls, and collision detection.

== Gameplay ==
Gameplay screenshot

Cosmic Race is a spaceship-racing game. The game consists of six different ships, including the Borg, Couga, Hito-01, Propeller, and S-lagon, each with their own anime-style driver. The game had sorts of humanoid cats, dogs, and humans.

It has multiple gamemodes, including:

- "point time try"
- "cosmic race"
- "chase 1pad" (two player)
- "chase 2pad" (two player)
- "scramble"
- "story"

== Development and release ==
Cosmic Race was developed by Neorex, a Japanese systems architecture and information technology firm. Founded in 1987 in Nagoya, Neorex was one of the first third-party supporters for the debut of the PlayStation. Kenji Nakamura led a team of more than 20 people on the game's production and had to convince the company's president, who was initially against game development, to allow the project. Neorex's online profile describes Cosmic Race as its "first and last (?) game software." A release date of December 1994 was initially reported. Some of the game's graphical assets were allegedly taken directly from the PlayStation's software development kit. Early footage on video shows a number of changes that were made in the final release. The game was released exclusively in Japan on January 20, 1995.

== Reception and legacy ==
Reception

Review scores
Publication	Score
Famitsu	16/40
Game Players	0%
Next Generation	1/5
Consoles +	71%
Dengeki PlayStation	40/100, 45/100, 30/100, 35/100
Última Generacion	35/100
Ultimate Future Games	25%

Cosmic Race suffered a generally negative reception and has been considered by some publications to be among the worst video games of all time due to graphical and technical issues. In Japan, Famitsu gave it a lowly 16 out of 40. Next Generation rated it one star out of five, and stated, "Although there are only a few titles available on the PlayStation, it is obvious, in comparison, that Cosmic Race is substandard on almost every level. The graphics are childish and uninspired and the control is entirely awkward. If all were right with the world, this game would never have been made." The French magazine Player One offered similar complaints, shaming the developer Neorex for its design. The Spanish magazine Última Generacion scored it 35 out of 100, stating that the game coined the term "octopus player" due to the number of gamepad buttons that must be simultaneously pressed to successfully play it. Ultimate Future Games gave it 25% and commented, "The polygon crust hides, not very effectively, an annoying game which shelters in the shadow of Ridge Racer. Please do not buy this. You've been warned."

One publication with particular disdain for Cosmic Race was Game Players. Writer Mike Salmon first mentioned it as the PlayStation's worst offering in its July 1995 issue. The magazine, which reviewed games on a percentage scale, eventually began equating its 0% grade to Cosmic Race. It even gave it a "Special Achievement Award" in its 1995 holiday issue, stating, "A game this bad is no accident. It takes special planning, long, hard work, and a dedicated group of evil geniuses." In September 1996, just before changing its name to Ultra Game Players, the magazine commemorated the occasion by finally giving Cosmic Race a proper review where writer Chris Charla bemoaned long loading times, poor graphics, a counterintuitive control system, and a complete lack of collision detection. The use of Cosmic Race as the bottom of the Game Players rating system was referenced in a presentation about kusoge ("crap games") at PAX East 2017. In an article about kusoge, Video Game Collector noted Cosmic Race alongside Twin Goddesses, Exector, Not Treasure Hunter, and Metal Jacket as "terrible" releases in the early PlayStation library.

Despite its mostly unfavorable reception, there have been some positive perspectives on Cosmic Race. Both Última Generacion and Ultimate Future Games commended its polygon graphics. François Garnier of Consoles + issued an overall score of 71%, concluding that its multiple gameplay modes make up for all of its other shortcomings. GameFan editor Dave Halverson initially considered Cosmic Race the PlayStation's first bad game but warmed up to it after getting used to its vehicle physics and handling. In 2007, GameSetWatch columnist Danny Cowan was disappointed the game did not live up to its infamy. "The inexplicably awesome soundtrack alone keeps it out of 0% range, and the simple race-to-the-finish gameplay is compelling precisely because the game's programmers botched it so badly," he wrote. "It's more fair to call Cosmic Race the stupidest game of all time, rather than one of the worst."
