= Vroom in the Night Sky =

2017 video game

- Developer: Poisoft
- Publisher: Poisoft
- Producer: Hiroshi Ishikawa
- Designer: Masahiro Kitago
- Programmers: Hiroshi Ishikawa; Akihiro Nakagawa
- Platform: Nintendo Switch
- Release: WW: March 3, 2017; NA: April 5, 2017
- Genre: Racing
- Mode: Single-player

Vroom in the Night Sky, (Note: Stylized as Vroom in the night sky) known in Japan as Soratobu Bunbun Burn, (Note: Japanese: 空飛ぶブンブンバーン, Hepburn: Soratobu Bunbunbān) is an action racing video game for the Nintendo Switch developed and published by Poisoft. It was released on the eShop on March 3, 2017 in Japan and other territories as a launch title for the system, and in North America on April 5.

Vroom in the Night Sky was universally panned by critics for its controls, lack of content and polish, and incoherent translation, often being considered a "rushed launch title". Upon release, it became synonymous with shovelware released on the console, one of the lowest-rated video games on Metacritic, and has been described by several critics as one of the worst video games of all time.

== Gameplay ==
The player is a magical girl who rides on a flying scooter and collects items called "Stardusts", while shooting missiles at giant circles in order to open a portal. The player can also earn Stardusts for doing "cool moves", which can be spent on new bikes.

== Plot ==
The player is named "Magical Girl Luna" and is attempting to open a portal known as the "Magical Gate". Other characters in the game include a flying creature and an evil witch.

== Reception ==
Reception

Aggregate score
Aggregator	Score
Metacritic	17/100

Review scores
Publication	Score
Destructoid	1/10
Nintendo Life	3/10
Nintendo World Report	2/10
Pocket Gamer	1/5

The game received an overwhelmingly negative reception, with an aggregate score of 17/100 on Metacritic, one of the lowest scores of the site.

Criticism targeted its controls, story and translation. Jed Whitaker of Destructoid rated the game 1/10, calling it a "steaming pile of shit", saying it was not only one of the worst games on the Switch, but one of the worst he had ever reviewed in his life. He called the controls "slippery" and "imprecise", and the story nonsensical due to its poor translation. He stated that he could not imagine "how or why" Nintendo would have approved the game for sale, calling it "shovelware". Glen Fox of Pocket Gamer said that it was better to "go outside and read a book" than even attempt to play the game, calling it "truly awful" and the price "insulting". Casey Gibson of Nintendo World Report said that the game was "the epitome of a rushed launch title" and that "every Switch owner should pass on [it]".

== See also ==
- Cosmic Race
