= Formula One Championship Edition =

2006 video game

- North American cover art
- Developer: Studio Liverpool
- Publisher: Sony Computer Entertainment
- Series: Formula One
- Platform: PlayStation 3
- Release: JP: 28 December 2006; NA: 27 February 2007; EU: 23 March 2007
- Genre: Racing
- Modes: Single-player, multiplayer

Formula One Championship Edition is a 2006 racing video game developed by Studio Liverpool and published by Sony Computer Entertainment for the PlayStation 3. It is the final installment in the Formula One series, as Codemasters would pick up the license for their own F1 series.

== Background ==
The game follows the basic structure of Formula One 06 for the PlayStation 2 and PlayStation Portable. The main differences include the updated visuals for the PS3 including a lot more detail, Sixaxis compatibility, real time reflections, car reflections on wet circuits and new wet weather effects. Early in development the safety car was to be included in the game for the first time in an F1 game since Formula One 99 for the PlayStation but was removed before the final release along with the PSP wing mirror integration shown at E3.

The game also boasts dynamic weather, and improved AI. The AI system is called "Live Action Racing" where one can pressure the opposition, causing them to make little mistakes such as running wide on corners, causing them to crash into other cars or spin off the road of their own accord. The AI will then try to seek opportunities to pass the player in a realistic manner.

The game is based on the early 2006 Formula One World Championship. Hence, Yuji Ide drives for Super Aguri when in reality he lost his super licence just 4 races into the '06 Formula One World Championship, and Franck Montagny, then later Sakon Yamamoto took his seat. Other minor changes throughout the real 2006 Formula One World Championship are also not represented, therefore Pedro de la Rosa, Robert Kubica, Robert Doornbos, Franck Montagny and Sakon Yamamoto are not featured. Also, the Midland team are not re-branded as Spyker in later Grands Prix in the game.

In the career mode, players begin by running tests for one of three teams (Toro Rosso, Super Aguri or Midland F1) at either the Silverstone, Magny Cours or Catalunya circuits. The tests given vary between the teams. When the player successfully completes the tests, they are given the role of test driver or race driver, depending on how well the player performed in the test. After performing well as a test driver, the player will become the second driver of the team. From there the player can compete in race weekends through many different roles. As a test driver the player will try out different car settings in practice, and as a driver the player will have track position targets to meet to keep the seat. The player's performances are subject to review at several points during the season.

The initial release did not include force feedback support, which is considered by many to be an important feature for simulation racing games used with driving wheel controllers. A subsequent update in early 2008 added force feedback. The game also lacks support for 1080i or 1080p output resolutions. Per the calendar, the Belgian Grand Prix is not included.

== Gameplay ==
Formula One Championship Edition follows the 2006 Formula One World Championship, with 18 tracks, 11 teams and 22 drivers. Driver changes that happened during the real 2006 Formula One World Championship are also not included, such as Juan Pablo Montoya leaving McLaren after the United States Grand Prix and replaced by Pedro de la Rosa and Jacques Villeneuve leaving BMW Sauber after the German Grand Prix and replaced by Robert Kubica.

== Release ==
Formula One Championship Edition was released in North America on February 27, 2007. It was the first Formula One game to be released there since 2003, when Atari released Grand Prix Challenge exclusively for PlayStation 2 and EA Sports released F1 Challenge '99-'02 for the PC, and F1 Career Challenge for the PlayStation 2, Xbox, and GameCube. It was a launch title for the European and Australasian release of the PlayStation 3.

Formula One Championship Edition was the final release in Sony's series of F1 games which had been running for over a decade, with the announcement that Codemasters had secured exclusive rights to the sport following shortly after the game's release. As this game was effectively an update of the PlayStation 2 and PlayStation Portable game Formula One 06, there was to be no 2007 version of the game - the first time the series had skipped a season since 1996.

This was the most recent F1 game given the three-season gap before Sumo Digital's F1 2009 (published by Codemasters) game came out on the PlayStation Portable and the Wii. In September 2010, Codemasters released F1 2010 with all the official teams and tracks, available on PS3, Xbox 360 and PC.

== Reception ==
Reception

Aggregate score
Aggregator	Score
Metacritic	74/100

Review scores
Publication	Score
Edge	4/10
Electronic Gaming Monthly	7.17/10
Eurogamer	6/10
Famitsu	30/40
Game Informer	8/10
GamePro	5/5
GameRevolution	B
GameSpot	7.2/10
GameSpy	4/5
GameTrailers	7.3/10
GameZone	8/10
IGN	(UK) 7.5/10 (US) 7.2/10
PlayStation: The Official Magazine	8/10
Detroit Free Press	2/4
The Sydney Morning Herald	3/5

The game received "average" reviews according to the review aggregation website Metacritic. In Japan, Famitsu gave it a score of 30 out of 40.

411Mania gave it an eight out of ten, praising the gameplay, graphics, customization and called it a "high-octane fun". The Sydney Morning Herald gave it three stars out of five, and was positive to the graphics and car handling. The Detroit Free Press was more negative to the game and gave it two stars out of four, writing: "How well can you follow a big green line? The game shows you the shortest distance around the track -- a green line to follow. The line turns briefly red when you come to a turn, but don't ease up on the throttle, because the game slows your vehicle down for you. How boring is that?"
