= Auxiliary Power's Demolition Derby and Figure 8 Race =

2001 video game

- Developer: Auxiliary Power
- Publisher: Auxiliary Power
- Platform: Windows
- Release: October 2001
- Genre: Racing
- Modes: Single-player, multiplayer

Auxiliary Power's Demolition Derby and Figure 8 Race is a PC demolition derby and figure 8 racing game. The game was developed by John C. Ardussi with the help of real demolition derby drivers and officials.

== Gameplay ==
In this game, there are 4 difficulty levels and 9 different original tracks. There are 11 original body styles and over 50 original AI(computer) drivers. Engines smoke, stall, steam, and backfire. Vehicles get realistic damage. Just like real demolition derby, there is a heat, and then a final. You can get black flagged for sandbagging, or avoiding hits on purpose. Players start at a local level, then move on to regional then national level.
