= Formula One Arcade =

2002 video game

- Developer: Studio 33
- Publisher: Sony Computer Entertainment
- Series: Formula One
- Platform: PlayStation
- Release: EU: 19 July 2002
- Genre: Racing
- Modes: Single-player, multiplayer

Formula One Arcade is a racing video game developed by Studio 33 and published by Sony Computer Entertainment for the PlayStation. It was released only in Europe in July 2002.

== Gameplay ==
Formula One Arcade is based on the 2001 Formula One World Championship with 17 racing circuits and eleven teams of two drivers each, though the game is centered on hectic racing action and is considered unrealistic. Players compete in a faster paced race consisting of a few laps, against eleven other computer-controlled cars. The player can collect checkpoints and pickups such as a speed boost to increase the car's speed and attempt an overtake of a slower car, large tires (which give the car more grip), a wrench to repair the car, shields to protect the player in the event of a collision against a trackside barrier, a stopwatch to give the player more time to complete a lap of the circuit and autopilot that briefly controls the player's car on the racing line usually before the tricker parts of the track.

The game provides track direction indicators informing the player the sharpness of each turn and how to take the corner. The driver is automatically eliminated from competition in the event the player does not cross the checkpoint before time runs out. At the conclusion of each race, the player is ranked both on their driving quality and the damage sustained to the car. There is a stage mode that allows the player to unlock tracks if they win races. Multiplayer allows for the two players to compete in a split-screen mode against a maximum of six participants, four of which are controlled by computer.

== Development ==
The game was developed by Studio 33 and it was reported by Official UK PlayStation Magazine that a stand alone arcade game of Formula One motor racing had been made as the arcade mode on Sony Computer Entertainment's Formula One series had been considered its weak link. PlayTime wrote that the developers had wanted to "satisfy the need for quick, fast-paced entertainment" with the title. Formula One Arcade is an officially licenced Formula One game by the Fédération Internationale de l'Automobile, and was released for the PlayStation console in July 2002.

== Reception ==
David Gordon of The Independent wrote that the game was hugely unsuccessful in attempting to "tie in wacky power-ups to the traditional Formula One racing style" and that poor graphics and driving physics made it less enjoyable. Writing for Basingstoke and North Hampshire Gazette, Dave Hopwood was complimentary of the game's graphics and sound and called it "a great game for Formula One fans of all ages and is well worth a look next time you fancy some high-speed motoring action", giving it an overall rating of 4 out of 5. The Northern Echo's Nigel Burton said older PlayStation owners who had not stopped playing the console in favour of the PlayStation 2 would find a lot to like about the game but said it had been "dumbed down" for younger players. The reviewer for the Sunday Mercury gave the game a rating of 9 out of 10, writing that while it was not graphically pleasing, it had to be commended for its fast-paced nature and the accessibility it offered, allowing players to effortlessly select any driver and race on any circuit. Valérie Précigout of Jeuxvideo.com called the title "rather ugly" and that it was "far too easy with its single difficulty level, and that the two-player modes are hardly more fun than the single-player ones."

Eurogamer's John Pye said "its hardware is a little behind the times and it spends far too much time in the gravel traps, but it's fun to watch." The Spanish video game magazine HobbyConsolas did not find the graphics impressive and said that the game was not designed for Formula One enthusiasts in mind but was a game "especially suited for beginners to racing games—nothing more, nothing less." Play2Mania gave a rating of 6 and called it "an arcade game that’s fun for the first few rounds but loses its appeal once you realize it leaves very little room for your own skill." Planetstation described the power-ups as "a full-fledged Micro-Machines workshop with service in a flash" and said the game's unrealism and the poor graphics of the cars and circuits against a colourful background were "a tribute to psychedelia." The Polish video game magazine Neo Plus was critical of the handling model as "jerky" and the controls as "a bit finicky" but the reviewer wrote that while Formula One Arcade was not "exactly a sensational title, but compared to what we’ve been treated to lately by the lackluster developers at Midas, it’s a real gem."

Alex Cooke of GamesMaster gave it a rating of 62 per cent and was critical of the inclusion of the previous season's driver-line ups in the game as well as the tracks that appeared to him too narrow to allow for overtaking. He described it as "an average racer with little imagination in a flogged to death formula." Cooke concluded that it is "A strange middle of the road racer with real cars, real tracks and real drivers but unreal handling and drab upgrades." M! Games's Ulrich Steppberger wrote the action appeared graphically bland and noted a low frame rate. The reviewer for Consoles + thought the title's graphics held up well but criticised the limited choice of game modes.
