= Formula One 04 =

2004 video game

- Developer: Studio Liverpool
- Publisher: Sony Computer Entertainment
- Series: Formula One
- Platform: PlayStation 2
- Release: EU: 30 July 2004; AU: 6 August 2004; JP: 22 September 2004
- Genre: Racing
- Modes: Single-player, multiplayer

Formula One 04 is a 2004 racing video game developed by Studio Liverpool and published by Sony Computer Entertainment for the PlayStation 2. It is a sequel to Formula One 2003 and was based on the 2004 Formula One World Championship.

== Gameplay ==
The game features all ten teams and twenty drivers competing in the 2004 Formula One World Championship (except for mid-season changes), as well as the eighteen circuits and Grands Prix that formed the championship, including the new Bahrain International Circuit and Shanghai International Circuit.

It is the first Formula One game developed by Studio Liverpool to contain a 'Career Mode', which allows players to work their way through the Formula One teams over the course of a fixed number of seasons (albeit a repeat version of the 2004 Formula One World Championship each time). Players start out testing in a generic Formula One car, and if they are doing well enough in the test they are offered a contract by a small team such as Minardi. Players then work their way up the grid throughout their 'career' through a mixture of good tests and impressive race performances. This game also had Net Play available.

This is the only F1 game in the series to be changed in terms of gameplay after the original release. In the original version, there was a bug which during the timing of AI pitstops all the field crawled at pit lane speed, then they sped up once a few of the AI cars had made their stop, and it was common to be following a car which suddenly came to a halt and the player would end up hitting their rear and ending their race. Studio Liverpool responded to the fans' concerns about this issue and fixed this bug upon the release of the Platinum version.

Formula One 04 was released in Europe (PAL) and Japan (NTSC). The game features all the drivers and tracks from the 2004 Formula One World Championship, but does not represent the replacement drivers that featured in the real 2004 Formula One World Championship, therefore Timo Glock, Marc Gené, Antônio Pizzonia, Jacques Villeneuve and Ricardo Zonta are not featured.

== Development ==
Formula One 04 was announced in April 2004 by Sony Computer Entertainment, and was the second game in the exclusive deal between Sony Computer Entertainment and Formula One Administration, following Formula One 2003. The game was officially launched in London ahead of the 2004 British Grand Prix with model Emma B acting as the face of the game.

== Alcohol and tobacco-related sponsors ==
All alcohol and tobacco sponsors are censored:

- Ferrari's Marlboro is completely censored.
- McLaren's West is replaced by "David", "Kimi", and "Team" (in career mode) (like in real life).
- Renault's Mild Seven is replaced by the car numbers and the drivers' full names (like in real life).
- Jaguar's Beck's is replaced by "Best's".
- BAR's Lucky Strike is replaced by "Look Left", "Look Right", and "Don't Walk", with a barcode and Formula One cars.
- Williams's Budweiser is replaced by the normal colour of the car.
- Jordan's Benson & Hedges is replaced by "Be on Edge".

== Reception ==
Reception

Aggregate score
Aggregator	Score
Metacritic	77/100

Review scores
Publication	Score
Famitsu	30/40
Jeuxvideo.com	13/20
PALGN	7.5/10
The Guardian	2/5
The Times	4/5

Formula One 04 received "generally favorable reviews" according to the review aggregation website Metacritic.

Steve Boxer of The Guardian praised the graphics, the car handling, and the inclusion of all eighteen tracks but criticized the difficulty of the career mode and the lack of help in the car setup. In Japan, Famitsu gave it a score of 30 out of 40.
