= Metal Jacket =

1995 video game

- Developers: Solan (Pony Canyon, Team Tornado, Bandit)
- Publisher: Solan (Pony Canyon)
- Directors: Koichi Hatakeyama, Masayoshi Kanagawa
- Producer: Koichi Hatakeyama
- Designer: Koichi Hatakeyama
- Programmers: Koichi Hatakeyama, Katsuki Maruyama
- Composers: Seiji Toda, Hideya Nagata, Negi Poo
- Platform: PlayStation
- Release: JP: 22 September 1995
- Genres: First-person shooter, mech simulator
- Modes: Single-player, multiplayer

Metal Jacket (Note: Japanese: メタルジャケット, Hepburn: Metaru Jaketto) is a 1995 mecha-themed shoot 'em up video game published by Pony Canyon for the PlayStation. Released in Japan, the game was hyped but ultimately received a negative reception.

== Gameplay ==
Gameplay screenshot

Metal Jacket is a mech combat simulation game featuring six different kinds of terrain. Using the Link Cable, multiplayer versus matches against each other or against the computer is also possible.

== Plot ==
It's the year 2042, and giant robots called Metal Jackets have taken the place of standard military vehicles like tanks and troop transports. After years of civil war, Metal Jacket pilots have gained celebrity status, and the field of battle has turned into a showcase for them to strut their stuff.

== Development ==
Metal Jacket was among the earliest titles announced for Sony's then-upcoming PlayStation. It was originally targeted for a December 1994 release and was later reported to be coming in March 1995, later delayed again for July 1995. Still previews of the game were generally well-received. There were only two dedicated programmers for the game which partly meant that the focus had shifted from graphics to gameplay. Staff reported that about 60% of the game was complete as of April 1995.

The game was also designed to be the first to support the PlayStation Link Cable. However, the state of the game led to the delay in the cable's release. Electronic Arts picked up the game for a North American release, but the release there was eventually cancelled.

== Reception ==
Reception

Review scores
Publication	Score
Famitsu	8/10, 7/10, 6/10, 5/10
Dengeki PlayStation	40/100, 60/100, 60/100, 50/100

Metal Jacket was heavily panned for its poor graphics and "blocky visuals". Next Generation imported and reviewed the game, rating it one star out of five, and stated that "Targeting and movement are confusing [...] which doesn't help, and the missions all appear to be search-and-destroy affairs. In other words, it's substandard however you look at it." Maximum magazine called it the "worst" polygon graphics yet seen on the PlayStation up to that point. Game Players, in a review for Gungriffon, branded Metal Jacket a "total piece of crap which Japan had to put up with while the rest of the world was spared."
