= Formula One 2003 (video game) =

2003 video game

- Developer: Studio Liverpool
- Publisher: Sony Computer Entertainment
- Series: Formula One
- Platform: PlayStation 2
- Release: EU: 11 July 2003
- Genre: Racing
- Modes: Single-player, multiplayer

Formula One 2003 is a 2003 racing video game developed by Studio Liverpool and published by Sony Computer Entertainment for the PlayStation 2. It is a sequel to the 2002 video game Formula One 2002 and was based on the 2003 Formula One World Championship.

== Gameplay ==
The game features all ten teams and twenty drivers competing in the 2003 Formula One World Championship (except for mid-season changes), as well as the sixteen circuits and Grands Prix that formed the championship calendar. The game also includes the new one-shot qualifying rules and points system introduced for the 2003 Formula One World Championship, as well as the alterations to the Hungaroring and Suzuka circuits. Magny-Cours still uses its original layout.

There are eleven game modes available for single and multiplayer, including single-player arcade and simulation single race, time trial and championship modes, multiplayer for up to 4 players and a non-interactive spectator option. Online connectivity is not supported.

The game features all the drivers and tracks from the 2003 Formula One World Championship, but does not represent the replacement drivers that featured in the real 2003 Formula One World Championship, therefore Nicolas Kiesa, Zsolt Baumgartner, Marc Gené and Takuma Sato are not featured.

== Development ==
Formula One 2003 was announced in a press release from Sony Computer Entertainment in June 2003 with a July release date. The game was the first in the Formula One series to have an exclusive license from the Formula One Administration (FOA), which is responsible for the commercial rights and promotion of the Formula One world championship. The exclusive license granted Sony Computer Entertainment the sole rights to the Formula One series for four years.

The game was officially launched in London ahead of the 2003 British Grand Prix with model Jodie Marsh acting as the face of the game.

== Covers ==
Similar to the FIFA series, Formula One 2003 has different cover art depending on the region. David Coulthard's McLaren MP4-17D is used on the European/Global release. Fernando Alonso's Renault R23B was used on the Spanish release. Michael Schumacher's Ferrari F2003-GA is moved from the second car to the leading car for the Italian release. Heinz-Harald Frentzen's Sauber C22 is featured on the Swiss and Dutch releases. Mark Webber's Jaguar R4 is used on the Australian edition.

== Reception ==
Formula One 2003 gained mixed to positive reviews upon release, holding an aggregate score of 67.20% on GameRankings.

Kristan Reed of Eurogamer praised the controls and the graphics, stating that "every track is packed with detail, down to the individual trackside adverts, yet there is never any hint of pop up or the kind of draw distance issues that have blighted just about every F1 game ever made". He did however have reservations about the game's car damage and crash physics. He gave the game 8 out of 10. Brodie Gibbons of Futuregamez also praised the graphics but criticised the sound and replay value, scoring the game 77%. Writing in The Guardian, Jack Schofield noted that the game did not offer a large improvement over its predecessor outside the rule changes, but concluded that it "offers more than enough to keep casual gamers happy".
