= PlayStation Link Cable =

Peripheral cable for the PlayStation console

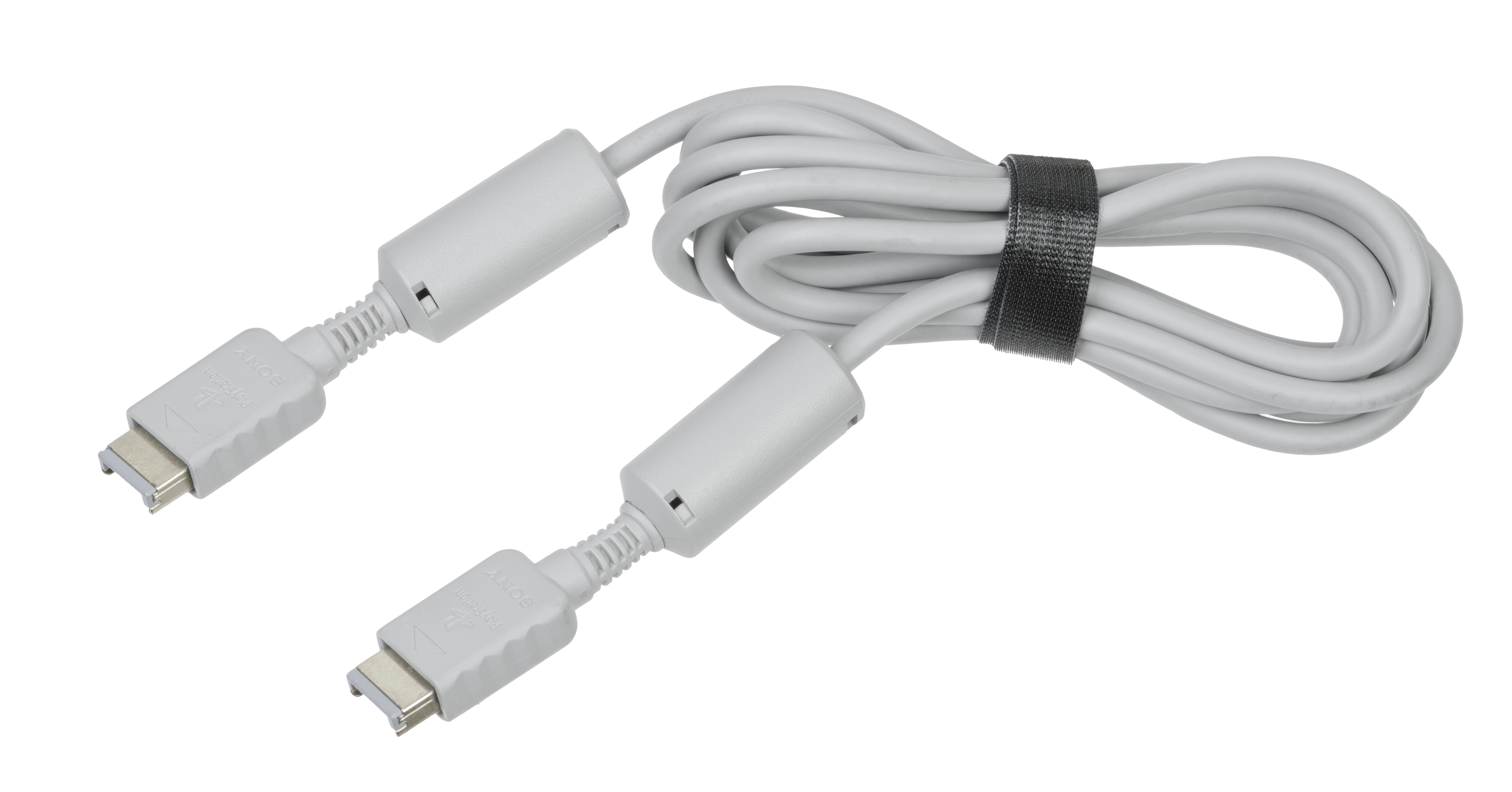
The PlayStation Link Cable

The PlayStation Link Cable (SCPH-1040) is a peripheral cable for the first generation PlayStation console. Utilizing the serial I/O port found on the back of most PlayStation models, it allows for two consoles to be connected in order to play compatible multiplayer games on separate consoles and displays. The cable is an 8-pin inline serial cable and was a fully supported Sony accessory for the market life of the console. It is not compatible with the redesigned PS one or newer PlayStations.

The accessory was released in 1995 retailing for ¥2000 in Japan or $40 in the United States; it was released later than expected due to the delay of Metal Jacket, which was supposed to be the first title to take advantage of the cable. The main advantage to using the cable is that a split-screen would not be necessary for multiplayer, increasing each player's screen size and potentially increasing game performance (as only one view has to be rendered per console). However, the use of this cable requires two televisions, two PlayStations (with appropriate cables), and two copies of the game being played (with a few exceptions (Note: Except for Armored Core: Master of Arena, Command & Conquer: Red Alert, Command & Conquer: Red Alert Retaliation, and Mobile Suit Z Gundam, which require only one copy as they come with two discs.)). This expense was impractical for most consumers, and by the end of 1997 most retailers were no longer carrying the PlayStation Link Cable.

== List of compatible games ==
Real-time strategy

- Command & Conquer: Red Alert
- Command & Conquer: Red Alert: Retaliation
- Dune 2000

First-person shooters

- Descent
- Descent Maximum
- Doom
- Duke Nukem: Total Meltdown / Duke Nukem
- Final Doom
- Krazy Ivan

Third-person shooters

- Armored Core
- Armored Core: Project Phantasma
- Armored Core: Master of Arena
- Metal Jacket^{JP}
- Mobile Suit Z Gundam^{JP}

Flight simulation/combat

- Bogey Dead 6 / Raging Skies / Sidewinder
- Independence Day
- Wing Over
- Zero Pilot^{JP}

Vehicular combat

- Assault Rigs
- Destruction Derby
- Red Asphalt / Rock N' Roll Racing 2
- Rogue Trip: Vacation 2012
- Twisted Metal 3^{NA} (2 to 8 players)

Racing

- Andretti Racing (2 to 4 players)
- Ayrton Senna Kart Duel
- Burning Road
- CART World Series (2 to 4 players)
- Dead in the Water
- Dodgem Arena^{PAL}
- Explosive Racing / X-Racing
- Formula 1
- Formula 1 98 (2 to 4 players)
- Monaco Grand Prix (Racing Simulation 2) (2 to 4 players)
- Motor Toon Grand Prix 2
- R4: Ridge Racer Type 4 (2 to 4 players)
- Racingroovy^{JP}
- Ridge Racer Revolution
- Road & Track Presents: The Need for Speed
- San Francisco Rush: Extreme Racing
- Shutokou Battle R^{JP}
- Streak: Hoverboard Racing
- Test Drive 4
- Test Drive Off-Road (Note: This functionality was only present in the North American release, and was removed for the European release.)
- TOCA 2 Touring Cars / Touring Car Challenge (2 to 4 players)
- Total Drivin / Car & Driver Presents: Grand Tour Racing '98 (2 to 4 players)
- Wipeout
- Wipeout 2097 / XL
- Wipeout 3 (2 to 4 players) (Note: Link Cable functionality is present but only accessible by a hidden menu in the original release of Wipeout 3. The functionality is fully present in the Special Edition release.)
- Wipeout 3: Special Edition^{PAL} (2 to 4 players)

Other genres

- Blast Radius
- Bushido Blade
- Bushido Blade 2
- Cool Boarders 2
- Pro Pinball: Big Race USA
- Robo Pit 2
- Trick'N Snowboarder
