= Chrysler D platform (RWD) =

Chrysler car platform

The rear wheel drive D platform was a body on frame chassis used only by Imperial from 1957 until 1966, (although Chrysler would not use such nomenclature until 1964). The standard chassis had a 129.0 inches (3.28 m) wheelbase and the extended wheelbase (limousine) chassis had a wheelbase of 149.5 inches (3.80 m). The D Platform had no major chassis components in common with any other Chrysler product and consequently maintained noticeably wider shoulder room and different exterior styling from contemporaneous Chrysler C platforms.

Famed for their durability and crashworthiness, Imperials built on the D platform were once a favorite of demolition derby contestants, so much so that demolition derbies have since outlawed the cars from most competitions.

== See also ==
- Chrysler platforms
