= Draw distance =

Distance of objects drawn by a rendering engine

The influence of different draw distances (Higher distances show more area.)

In computer graphics, draw distance (render distance or view distance) is the maximum distance of objects in a three-dimensional scene that are drawn by the rendering engine. Polygons that lie beyond the draw distance will not be drawn to the screen.

Draw distance requires definition because a processor having to render objects out to an infinite distance would slow down the application to an unacceptable speed. As the draw distance increases, more distant polygons need to be drawn onto the screen that would regularly be clipped. This requires more computing power; the graphic quality and realism of the scene will increase as draw distance increases, but the overall performance (frames per second) will decrease. Many games and applications will allow users to manually set the draw distance to balance performance and visuals.

== Problems in older games ==
Older games had far shorter draw distances, most noticeable in vast, open scenes. In many cases, once-distant objects or terrain may suddenly appear without warning or fade into view as the camera gets closer to them, an effect known as "pop-up graphics", "pop-in", or "draw in". This is a hallmark of short draw distance, and still affects large, open-ended games like the Grand Theft Auto series and Second Life. In newer games, this effect is usually limited to smaller objects such as people or trees, a contrast to older games where huge chunks of terrain may suddenly appear or fade in along with smaller objects. In some related cases, the objects and their related textures are loaded separately, resulting in the object first coming into view with a rough, undefined appearance, then later gaining definition as its texture is loaded. The Sony PlayStation game Formula 1 97 features a setting allowing the choice between fixed draw distance (with variable frame rate) and fixed frame rate (with variable draw distance).

== Alternatives ==
A common trick used in games to disguise a short draw distance is to obscure the area with a distance fog. Alternative methods have been developed to sidestep the problem altogether using level of detail manipulation. Black & White was one of the earlier games to use adaptive level of detail to decrease the number of polygons in objects as they moved away from the camera, allowing it to have a massive draw distance while maintaining detail in close-up views.

The Legend of Zelda: The Wind Waker uses a variant of the level of detail programming. The game overworld is divided into 49 squares in a 7×7 grid. Each square has an island inside of it; the distances between the island and the borders of the square are considerable. Everything within a square is loaded when entered, including all models used in close-up views and animations. Utilizing the telescope item, one can see just how detailed even far-away areas are. However, textures are not displayed; they are faded in as one gets closer to the square's island. Islands outside of the current square are less detailed—however, these far-away island models do not degenerate any further than that, even though some of these islands can be seen from everywhere else in the overworld. In both indoor and outdoor areas, there is no distance fog; however, there are some areas where "distance" fog is used as an atmospheric effect. As a consequence to the developers' attention to detail, however, some areas of the game have lower frame rates due to the large number of enemies on screen.

Halo 3 is claimed by its creators at Bungie to have a draw distance upwards of 14 miles, which is an example of the vastly improved draw distances made possible by more recent game consoles. In addition, Crysis is said to have a draw distance up to 16 kilometers (9.9 mi), while Cube 2: Sauerbraten has a potentially unlimited draw distance, possibly due to the larger map size. Grand Theft Auto V was praised for its seemingly infinite draw distance despite having a large, detailed map.

== See also ==
- Anisotropic filtering
- Distance fog
- Heightmap
- Level of detail (LOD)
- Mipmap
- Spatial anti-aliasing
