= Formula One (video game series) =

Racing video game series by Psygnosis and Studio Liverpool

Formula One is a series of computer and video games originally created by Psygnosis, who were eventually renamed to Studio Liverpool. It takes its name from the popular car racing series of the same name. Since 2001, the Formula One series had been made by Studio Liverpool (an internal Sony Computer Entertainment Europe game studio) formed from the restructuring of several studios including Psygnosis, which soon followed with the obtaining of an exclusive FOA Official Licence, which barred any other company to produce a Formula One game for any other platform for 5 years. Sony used this exclusive licence to make Formula One games from 2003 until 2007, releasing a new title every year which included improvements to the graphics engine as well as an updated and complete F1 grid showing the latest liveries, chassis and drivers. The series covered every year from 1995 to 2006, with the exception of the 1996 season. By February 2007, Sony lost the license to produce Formula One video games, and Formula One Championship Edition, released at the very end of the previous year, was the last game in a series that lasted more than a decade. In May 2008, Codemasters picked up the license, with Sumo Digital, producing F1 2009 for the PSP and Nintendo Wii a year and a half later. Codemasters took over the license proper in 2010, and as of 2026, currently maintains the rights to exclusively produce Formula One games.

== Games ==
Year	Title	Platform(s)
1996	Formula 1	PlayStation, Windows
1997	Formula 1 97	PlayStation, Windows
1998	Formula 1 98	PlayStation
1999	Formula One 99	PlayStation, Windows
2000	Formula One 2000	PlayStation, Game Boy Color
2001	Formula One 2001	PlayStation, PlayStation 2
2002	Formula One Arcade	PlayStation
2002	Formula One 2002	PlayStation 2
2003	Formula One 2003	PlayStation 2
2004	Formula One 04	PlayStation 2
2005	Formula One 05	PlayStation 2
2005	Formula One Grand Prix	PlayStation Portable
2006	Formula One 06	PlayStation 2, PlayStation Portable
2006	Formula One Championship Edition	PlayStation 3
