= Formula 1 98 =

1998 video game

- European box art
- Developer: Visual Science
- Publisher: Psygnosis
- Series: Formula One
- Platform: PlayStation
- Release: EU: 30 October 1998; NA: 9 December 1998
- Genre: Racing
- Modes: Single-player, multiplayer

Formula 1 98 is a 1998 racing video game developed by Visual Science and published by Psygnosis for the PlayStation. It is the sequel to the 1997 game Formula 1 97 and was based on the 1998 Formula One World Championship. It is the first game in the Formula One series to not be released for Windows.

== Overview ==
Following the departure of Bizarre Creations, Psygnosis offered Reflections Interactive the chance to develop Formula 1 98, but they pulled out to make Driver. Visual Science were hired to make the game. The game was then rushed for release to coincide with the final race of the 1998 Formula One World Championship. As a result of this, the game ended up being poorly-received by various gaming publications. Despite this, the game was a best-seller in the UK.

== Circuits ==
The game features 16 official Formula One circuits based on the 1998 Formula One World Championship plus 2 hidden tracks which can be accessed with cheat codes. One is based on a hippodrome, although it says "Colosseum" in the selection screen, and the other is a stunt track.

== Teams and drivers ==
The game features all of the official teams and drivers that competed in the 1998 Formula One World Championship, although like with its predecessor, Formula 1 97, Jacques Villeneuve's name and image are not featured due to him copyrighting both. The game refers to him as 'Williams Driver 1' and lists his nationality as 'Outer Mongolian'.

== Reception ==
Reception

Aggregate score
Aggregator	Score
GameRankings	70%

Review scores
Publication	Score
Computer and Video Games	3/5
Electronic Gaming Monthly	6.5/10
GamePro	3.5/5
GameSpot	7.5/10
IGN	7.3/10

The game received "average" reviews according to the review aggregation website GameRankings. PlayStation Power gave it a review of 69%, noting that "Psygnosis have managed to cock up the one uncockupable licence on the PlayStation" and that it was far worse than both F1 '97 and the original F1 game on the PlayStation.

In February 1999, Formula 1 98 received a "Platinum" sales award from the Verband der Unterhaltungssoftware Deutschland (VUD), indicating sales of at least 200,000 units across Germany, Austria and Switzerland.
