= Destruction Derby Arenas =

2004 video game

- European cover art
- Developer: Studio 33
- Publishers: EU: Sony Computer Entertainment; NA: Gathering
- Platform: PlayStation 2
- Release: EU: 9 January 2004; NA: 30 March 2004
- Genres: Vehicular combat, racing
- Modes: Single-player, multiplayer

Destruction Derby Arenas is a 2004 racing video game developed by Studio 33 and published by Sony Computer Entertainment for the PlayStation 2. Gathering released the game in North America. It is the fifth and final game in Psygnosis' Destruction Derby series.

== Reception ==
Reception

Aggregate score
Aggregator	Score
Metacritic	57/100

Review scores
Publication	Score
Electronic Gaming Monthly	4.67/10
Game Informer	6.75/10
GamePro	3.5/5
GameSpot	6.2/10
GamesTM	3/10
GameZone	6.8/10
IGN	4.5/10
Official U.S. PlayStation Magazine	2.5/5
PlayStation: The Official Magazine	7/10
X-Play	3/5

Destruction Derby Arenas received "mixed" reviews according to the review aggregation website Metacritic. IGN felt the game was worth an hour or two due to car crashes, but after that would quickly lose value. GameSpot felt the online mode was worth renting the game for genre fans, but that the game otherwise did not justify its cost.
