= Destruction Derby 64 =

1999 video game

- Developer: Looking Glass Studios
- Publisher: THQ
- Directors: Jeffery Hutt; David Socha; Phil Honeywell; Steven Riding
- Producers: Richard Biltcliffe; Kim Rogers; Tami Gabay; Jon Osborn; Edward J. Ramiro
- Designers: Jeffery Hutt; Jeffrey Betterley; Daniel Matanski; Mark Coates
- Programmers: Matt Grimshaw; Mike Nikkel; Magnus Danielsson; Miguel Gómez; David Gierok; Steve Aarnio; Steve Smith; Steve Smith; Jamie Millar
- Artists: Shelley Armstrong; Ole-Petter Rosenlund; Steve Lange; Lorian Kiesel Taylor; Les Betterly; Mike Prittie; Jeff Sturgeon; Nathan Herzog
- Writer: Stephen Wong
- Composer: Eric Brosius
- Series: Destruction Derby
- Platform: Nintendo 64
- Release: NA: 30 September 1999; EU: 12 October 1999
- Genres: Vehicular combat, racing
- Modes: Single-player, multiplayer

Destruction Derby 64 is a vehicular combat racing video game developed by Looking Glass Studios and published by THQ, under license from Psygnosis. It is the third installment in the Destruction Derby series, released on 30 September 1999 in North America and 12 October 1999 in Europe for the Nintendo 64.

== Gameplay ==
Destruction Derby 64, the game's Nintendo 64 version, features updated graphics and an increased number of cars and tracks; and it adds new modes such as capture the flag. The game contains twenty-four cars and more than twelve courses. It supports split-screen multiplayer for up to four players.

There is a set of eight tracks and four bowls, all in various different environments. They are reasonably detailed, although the texture detail suffers due to the Nintendo 64's smaller texture memory. The game is set further apart with its very distinct racing system.

Race events in Destruction Derby 64 have a particular focus on head-on collisions. Uniquely in this game, in a race, drivers are split into two or three groups, each starting at a different part of the track. The one or two group(s) opposing the player's race reversed, meaning they will drive towards the player's group which allows for head-on collisions to be executed. There are 12 drivers in any single player event (thus 11 opponents).

There is no lapping system in race events, with races only finished when the all opponents have been wrecked or the player themselves have. An arcade-style checkpoint and timer has been introduced. There is much emphasis on gripping opponents, which is encouraged to the player by the commentator. It is the combination of these points that determine the winner in race events.

One change is that the World Championship, which is the main career mode, does not use a 'division' system like the previous games. Instead it relies on four different difficulty levels: Novice, Amateur, Professional and Legend - each of which has a higher number of events to complete. The player initially starts out at the Novice level circuit, which then has to be completed before the Amateur circuit is unlocked. In addition, Destruction Derby 64 does not have a set of different competitor characters.

== Development ==
Destruction Derby 64 started development around April 1998 as reported by British magazine Computer and Video Games, claiming that Psygnosis (a division of Sony Computer Entertainment) was working on a Destruction Derby title for Nintendo 64 along with O.D.T. and Formula 1 98, and coming a week after the announcement of Wipeout 64.

Although by the end of the year these games were released (N64 versions of O.D.T. and Formula 1 98 were cancelled), Destruction Derby 64 was still far from ready. It took time until Psygnosis managed to grant THQ the Nintendo exclusive to publish it under license. Looking Glass Studios took development duties, a developer that achieved popularity at the time for its critically acclaimed PC game Thief: The Dark Project. DD64 was developed at the Intermetrics (which owned Looking Glass Studio) studio in Redmond, Washington State, USA. The game finally arrived after some 18 months time in late 1999.

At the time, Looking Glass head Paul Neurath said in a press release, "We are delighted to have teamed up with THQ for the launch of Destruction Derby 64". Aaron Boulding of IGN commented that the game "had a tough time just making it to the N64" during its 18 months in production, and noted that "development duties [...] passed from Psygnosis to Looking Glass Studios and publishing [was] picked up by THQ."

== Reception ==
Reception

Review scores
Publication	Score
AllGame	80%
Game Informer	7.25/10
GameFan	92/100
GameSpot	6.7/10
IGN	6.5/10
Mega Fun	77%
N64 Magazine	65%

Destruction Derby 64 received a mixed reception. Jeff Gerstmann of GameSpot wrote, "Graphically, Destruction Derby 64 surpasses the old PlayStation games by quite a bit - not that that is a particularly hard thing to do". He found that its framerate was adequate even in split-screen mode, and concluded that it was "a better game than its PlayStation counterparts". He finished, "Give it a rent next time you're rounding up the posse for a day of gaming." GameFan's Levi Buchanan praised it as "the best racer for the Nintendo 64 this year", and he lauded its "simplistic control" as a remedy for the complex controls that he believed had "ruined the PlayStation versions". He liked its graphics but wrote that its music "isn't too hot". Buchanan enjoyed its multiplayer component and wrote that "the slowdown when all four join in is minima[l]—nice programming on the part of Looking Glass". Although he complained that the game's vehicle damage is not "segmented throughout your car", he concluded by calling the game "pure, unadulterated fun [that] has enough tracks and hidden vehicles to keep you playing for a very long time".

Tim Weaver from the British N64 Magazine praised the derby bowls and the multiplayer options, calling the Bomb Tag mode "absolutely fantastic". But he felt that the one-player mode was "short-lived" and that it becomes "boring". Weaver also noted the "shocking" framerate problems and criticised the car designs, comparing them to a cardboard boxes. Weaver called DD64 "three years out of date" and ended the review calling it "average".

Aaron Boulding of IGN believed that Destruction Derby 64 came too long after the original version, and that it was "a shadow of the outdated PSX game". He complained about the "bland backgrounds and flat textures" and noted that the graphics are "grainy" and suffer from slowdown; but he enjoyed the car damage visuals. Boulding liked the split-screen multiplayer and called the new capture the flag mode the game's best aspect, but he concluded that "even [these elements] may not make it worth a rental".

"Jeff Gerstmann of GameSpot wrote, "Graphically, Destruction Derby 64 surpasses the old PlayStation games by quite a bit - not that that is a particularly hard thing to do". He found that its framerate was adequate even in split-screen mode, and concluded that it was "a better game than its PlayStation counterparts". He finished, "Give it a rent next time you're rounding up the posse for a day of gaming."

Erik Reppen of Game Informer wrote that it "doesn't seem fair to compare" the Nintendo 64 release to the PlayStation version, and he complained that car damage does not hinder performance. He said that it would more accurately be described as "Destruction Derby Arcade". He found that the game was far too easy for "experienced racers and big fans of the franchise" to enjoy, and finished, "It was fun, but I wouldn't buy it."
