= Demolition Racer =

1999 video game

- Developer: Pitbull Syndicate
- Publisher: Infogrames North America
- Producer: Chris Downend
- Programmer: John Blackburne
- Artist: Darren Abbott
- Composer: W. Scott Snyder
- Platforms: PlayStation, Windows, Dreamcast
- Release: PlayStation: NA: 28 September 1999; UK: 19 November 1999; Windows: NA: 19 October 1999; EU: 1 February 2000; Dreamcast: NA: 25 October 2000
- Genres: Vehicular combat, racing
- Modes: Single-player, multiplayer

Demolition Racer is a 1999 vehicular combat racing video game for the PlayStation, Dreamcast, and Microsoft Windows, developed by British studio Pitbull Syndicate and published by Infogrames North America.

== Gameplay ==
Gameplay screenshot

The game combines destruction and driving tactics in a fast-paced racing environment. It is very similar to the Destruction Derby series.

Races are won not solely by coming first in the race but by gaining the most points during the course of the event, with points being awarded for crashing into the competitors cars, breaking points boxes scattered on the track, and lastly by placing high, which delivers a points multiplier. The player must be careful of the condition of his own car as if it takes too much damage the race will end with a disqualification. Boxes are also scattered across the track that repair the players car when run over.

The PC version contained slightly better in-game graphics than the PlayStation version, and included varied weather and times of day. Drivers are given (optional) wacky portraits which displayed on the side of the screen in a race, showing who's ahead of who.

== Development ==
On 15 March 1999, the game was announced by Accolade. it was developed by UK company Pitbull Syndicate as a spiritual sequel to their earlier Destruction Derby series, a series which many of the Pitball staff had previously worked on when at their prior employment at Reflections.

== Reception ==
Reception

Aggregate scores
Aggregator	Score		
Aggregator	Dreamcast	PC	PS
GameRankings	76%	54%	73%
Metacritic	77/100	N/A	N/A

Review scores
Publication	Score		
Publication	Dreamcast	PC	PS
AllGame	N/A	3.5/5	N/A
CNET Gamecenter	N/A	8/10	8/10
Computer Games Strategy Plus	N/A	2/5	N/A
Electronic Gaming Monthly	N/A	N/A	6.75/10
Game Informer	8/10	N/A	7.5/10
GameFan	70%	N/A	N/A
GamePro	4.5/5	2/5	4.5/5
GameRevolution	B+	N/A	N/A
GameSpot	7.8/10	7.8/10	6.4/10
IGN	6.8/10	N/A	7.8/10
Next Generation	3/5	N/A	1/5
Official U.S. PlayStation Magazine	N/A	N/A	4/5
PC Accelerator	N/A	5/10	N/A

Demolition Racer: No Exit received "generally favourable reviews" according to the review aggregation website Metacritic. Jeff Lundrigan of NextGen said of the PlayStation version in its November 1999 issue, "Although this game has some 'modern' enhancements like shortcuts (which seem sort of pasted in), the game mechanics might as well have been transplanted whole and bleeding from Destruction Derby," and warned the reader to "Steer clear of this smoking wreck." A year later, however, he wrote that No Exit "still isn't living up to its potential, but it's a fun title nonetheless."
