= Formula 1 (video game) =

1996 video game

- European PlayStation box art
- Developer: Bizarre Creations
- Publisher: Psygnosis
- Series: Formula One
- Platforms: PlayStation, Windows
- Release: PlayStation: EU: 13 September 1996; NA: 22 October 1996; Windows: NA: 27 June 1997
- Genre: Racing
- Modes: Single-player, multiplayer

Formula 1 is a 1996 racing video game developed by Bizarre Creations and published by Psygnosis for PlayStation and Microsoft Windows. It is the first installment in Psygnosis' Formula One series.

Formula 1 is based on the 1995 Formula One World Championship. It is distinct from its sequels because it was made at the end of the season, meaning that it features driver substitutes. The game also allows two players to compete against each other either head-to-head or with other computer cars via the PlayStation Link Cable. Both players may then compete over a 17-race Championship season, or in a single race of the player's choice.

== Gameplay ==
Formula 1 contains 17 tracks, 13 teams and 35 drivers. If a player is to complete a season after winning every race, and leading the Constructor's Championship, a special hidden circuit is unlocked. The track is a fictional lower-level city circuit called Frameout City, which when viewed at the Race Preview page is in the shape of a Formula One car. The only way to keep the track available is to save just after having completed the season, then loading the data at the next turning on of the console.

Later tracks have 24 competitors on them instead of 26 because Simtek pulled out of the actual championship after the Monaco Grand Prix. It is still possible to drive a Simtek on any course after Monaco, creating a field of 25 drivers. If two players are playing the game via the link cable setup (where players would connect two PlayStation consoles together with two copies of the game), it is possible to play as both Simtek cars, thus creating a field of 26 drivers on any course after Monaco. Every starting grid (in dry races) is the same as the real 1995 Grand Prix, timing included.

== Development ==
The track models in Formula 1 were modelled from surveyors' track data. The designers started with wire-frame models of the track data, then exported these from their Silicon Graphics workstations to a custom Windows 95 track editor. The track editor was used to reformat the tracks so that they could be used in-game, before exporting them back to the SGI workstations where scenery and other details were added in. To create the in-car sound, a Digital Audio Tape was strapped to a driver.

Car models were created based on a combination of information provided by FOCA and real life photographs of the cars. The result was that all car models were unique rather than just a single model with different coloured "skins".

Though Psygnosis was the game's publisher, development team Bizarre Creations opted to create their own 3D engine for the game rather than utilizing the one from the Psygnosis hits Wipeout and Destruction Derby. To reduce demand on the PlayStation's processor without significantly reducing the game's visuals, the developers programmed a level of detail method so that when a car reaches a certain distance away, it switches from its normal high-detail model (composed of 440 to 450 polygons, depending on the car) to a low-detail model composed of only 90 to 100 polygons.

The game's original release date was pushed back to allow the developers time to make last-minute tweaks, fix bugs, and make the complex graphical changes needed to remove cigarette and alcohol advertising, which is illegal in video games in some parts of the United States.

Probe Software started work on a port of the game for the Sega Saturn in 1997. Psygnosis's Formula One license had expired by this time, presenting a potential obstacle to this conversion being released. It was cancelled by June 1997.

== Commentary ==
This game saw the introduction of in-game commentary, which was done in the English version of the game by Murray Walker, the German version by Jochen Mass, the French version by Philippe Alliot, the Spanish version by Carlos Riera and the Italian version by Luigi Chiappini.

== Soundtrack ==
The in-game music – credited to "Overdrive" – was composed by Mike Clarke, who worked in-house at Psygnosis at the time, and Stuart Ellis, a session guitarist from Liverpool and owner of Curly Music, an independent music retailer. The soundtrack also features the songs "Juice" by Steve Vai (from Alien Love Secrets), as well as "Summer Song" and "Back to Shalla-Bal" by Joe Satriani (from The Extremist and Flying in a Blue Dream, respectively).

== Reception ==
Reception

Review scores
Publication	Score
Electronic Gaming Monthly	7.25/10 (PS)
GameSpot	7.6/10 (PS); 6.0/10 (PC)
IGN	8.0/10 (PS)
Next Generation	5/5 (PS)

The game was a best-seller in the UK. Worldwide sales across all computer and console versions of Formula 1 surpassed 1.7 million units by August 1997. In August 1998, the game's PlayStation version received a "Platinum" sales award from the Verband der Unterhaltungssoftware Deutschland (VUD), indicating sales of at least 200,000 units across Germany, Austria and Switzerland. It was the fastest selling CD game at the time in the UK and was a major killer app for the system.

The PlayStation version was reasonably well-received, with critics generally commenting that the realistic handling and real-world Formula One elements make it an ideal game for the hardcore racing fan. Some reviewers added that the game was too complicated and difficult to appeal to those looking for arcade-style racing or multiplayer gaming, though most praised the selection of modes as opening up the game to both novices and experts.

Critics were more divided about the graphics. Todd Mowatt wrote in Electronic Gaming Monthly that "the fluidity of the animations were not that realistic in terms of the way a real race car would handle", GamePro's Air Hendrix praised the detailed cars and sense of speed but complained of break-up problems, and Next Generation hailed the graphics as a major leap over the first wave of PlayStation games. GameSpot called the game "a high-octane masterpiece", while Next Generation said that Formula 1, with its "exquisite" graphics, wide range of challenges, and startling amount of depth, is the game that changed everything in the racing genre. PSM gave the game 9/10, praising the AI, and called it a PS1 killer app of 1996.

Reviewing the PC version in GameSpot, Tim Soete praised the graphics and audio commentary but found the lack of depth and realism in the driving made the game become dull after a short while.

Review aggregation website GameRankings provides an average rating for the PlayStation version of 87.75% based on 4 reviews. The PC version received an average rating of 56.40% based on 10 reviews.
