= Wipeout Omega Collection =

2017 video game compilation

- Developers: XDev; Clever Beans; EPOS Game Studios
- Publisher: Sony Interactive Entertainment
- Series: Wipeout
- Platform: PlayStation 4
- Release: NA: 6 June 2017; EU: 7 June 2017
- Genre: Racing
- Modes: Single-player, multiplayer

Wipeout Omega Collection (stylised as WipE′out Omega Collection) is a 2017 racing video game compilation developed by XDev, Clever Beans and EPOS Game Studios and published by Sony Interactive Entertainment for the PlayStation 4. It was first released in North America on 6 June 2017, and in Europe a day later.

The compilation includes remasters of two entries in the series: Wipeout HD (2008), along with its Wipeout HD Fury expansion (2009), and Wipeout 2048 (2012). Both games revolve around players competing in anti-gravity racing leagues. Wipeout Omega Collection is the first title in the Wipeout series not to be developed by franchise creators Studio Liverpool, following its closure in 2012. It received positive reviews upon release, with many critics welcoming the series' return and the upgraded visuals, as well as the preservation of its ubiquitous techno soundtrack.

== Contents ==
Screenshot from the remastered Wipeout HD. From left to right clockwise, the interface displays the lap and time, shield strength, current position, speedometer, and lap time.

Wipeout Omega Collection is a remaster of the previous two titles in the Wipeout series: Wipeout HD (with its Wipeout HD Fury expansion) and Wipeout 2048. Wipeout HD itself contains content from the PlayStation Portable titles Wipeout Pure and Wipeout Pulse. In all games, players control anti-gravity ships which are owned by racing corporations (effectively referred to as 'teams' in-game). Every ship has different characteristics; for example, each ship's statistics vary in handling, thrust, top speed and shield strength. Each ship is equipped with an energy shield which absorbs damage sustained during a race; energy is lost whenever the player's ship collides with the trackside barrier, other ships, or is hit by weapon fire. If the shield runs out, the player's ship will explode and is consequently eliminated from the race. The player may replenish energy by absorbing unwanted weapon pick-ups.

Nine game modes appear in Omega Collection: from HD; tournament, speed lap, time trial and single races return, as does the "Zone" mode, in which the player must survive as their ship increasingly accelerates to extreme speeds. From the Fury expansion; "Zone Battle", Eliminator and Detonator features in the compilation, in addition the entire campaign from 2048. The games contain a total of 26 unique tracks and 46 unique ship models, and include local split-screen and online multiplayer. The campaigns for both games are split into three groups, in a similar manner to how the HD and Fury campaigns were separated in Wipeout HD Fury. The compilation is capable of running at a native resolution of 1080p on the PlayStation 4 and 4K on the PlayStation 4 Pro, both at 60 frames per second. In addition to new special effects and upgraded textures, it also has an optional HDR-compatibility mode which is supported on both consoles. An update to the game added support for PlayStation VR. The Omega Collection features 28 licensed soundtracks; if the PlayStation Music app is installed, players can use the "Best of WipEout" Spotify playlist to play tracks from older Wipeout games.

== Development and release ==
The original developers of the Wipeout series, Studio Liverpool, was closed by Sony Worldwide Studios in August 2012. It was reported that around the time of its close the studio was developing a "dramatically different" Wipeout launch title for the then-upcoming PlayStation 4. Despite the studio's closure, its Liverpool campus at Wavertree Technology Park still houses Sony's External Development Studio Europe (XDev) among other departments.

In 2015, Sony Worldwide Studios President Shuhei Yoshida hinted towards a possible Wipeout title for the PlayStation 4, saying that the company would like to "balance" the number of games in their franchises. The following year Nick Burcombe, co-creator of the original Wipeout, affirmed that enthusiasm towards developing a new instalment remained high among his team, should Sony decide to commission one. When asked about the potential revival of the Wipeout brand, Burcombe commented that any new title would be wholly contingent on demand and Sony's willingness to relinquish the franchise.

Wipeout Omega Collection was formally announced by Sony Interactive Entertainment during the annual PlayStation Experience expo on 4 December 2016, with a slated release date in the summer of 2017. The game was available both via digital and retail format on 6 June for North America and 7 June for Europe. A virtual reality version of the game was released through a free patch in March 2018. Those who pre-ordered the game digitally were gifted a dynamic theme for their PlayStation 4 as well as access to an exclusive ship called the Van-Uber. Those who buy the game digitally after release also gain access to the Van-Uber ship. Those who pre-ordered the disc version in Europe were given an exclusive steelbook as well as customisable themes for the PlayStation 4.

== Reception ==
Reception

Aggregate score
Aggregator	Score
Metacritic	85/100

Review scores
Publication	Score
Destructoid	8.5/10
GameSpot	9/10
GamesRadar+	4.5/5
Jeuxvideo.com	16/20
Push Square	8.2
Wired UK	8/10

Wipeout Omega Collection received "generally favorable" reviews from critics, according to review aggregator website Metacritic. It also appeared among Metacritic's top 30 highest ranked PlayStation 4 games of 2017.

The upgraded visuals of both Wipeout HD and 2048 received unanimous praise among critics. Martin Robinson from Eurogamer lauded the game's improved lighting, textures, and HDR-compatibility while remarking that the game "never looked better" despite its "greying roots". GameSpot's Miguel Concepcion asserted that game was Wipeout "in its prettiest form", commenting that the visual fidelity of HD and 2048 demonstrated that it was not merely a direct port. David Meikleham of GamesRadar+ likewise praised its "pristine" 4K visuals and heralded the compilation as a perfect illustrator for HDR gaming. Sammy Barker from Push Square noted that the exceptional presentation epitomised the appeal of the wider Wipeout franchise, concluding that the Omega Collection was a visually impressive remaster Frédéric Goyon from Jeuxvideo.com commended the compilation's "charismatic" aesthetic design and was enthralled over the remastered graphics. Wired UK's Matt Kamen praised the visuals of both games and the intricate details of its textures, cementing that the whole experience was "glorious to behold", while Jordan Devore from Destructoid reckoned that the compilation's visual polish alone made it a worthwhile purchase, regardless of a 4K setup.

Although the gameplay was mainly well-received, some critics noted a sense of repetition despite the abundance of content. Devore opined that certain long-time players of the franchise may feel fatigued over the tracks that have been used repeatedly over the years, but nevertheless thought the overall experience was entertaining in its own right. Robinson observed that both HD and 2048 offer distinct personalities and offers a "purposely" aggressive and meaningful amount of substance for the player. Concepcion praised the compilation's consistent gameplay and its gradual progression in difficulty, while Meikleham felt that the Omega Collection's recycled content did not matter in light of its quantity. Barker and Goyon found the controls to be fluid and responsive, with Barker commenting that its gameplay was permeated by an "eye-watering" sense of speed. Kamen enjoyed the combined elements of 2048's campaign progression system and HD's more "down to earth" tournament structure, noting that both games contributed to an overall "smoothly" integrated experience.

Wipeout Omega Collection became the first game in the series to gain the UK All Formats physical No. 1, and entered the download charts at No. 15. The game was nominated for "Racing Game" at The Independent Game Developers' Association Awards 2017, and for "Music Design" at the 2018 Develop Awards.
