= Wipeout HD =

2008 video game

- Cover art for the retail version
- Developer: Studio Liverpool
- Publisher: Sony Computer Entertainment
- Series: Wipeout
- Platform: PlayStation 3
- Release: EU/NA: 25 September 2008
- Genre: Racing
- Modes: Single-player, multiplayer

Wipeout HD is a 2008 racing video game developed by Studio Liverpool and published by Sony Computer Entertainment for the PlayStation 3. It is the eighth instalment of the Wipeout series and the first on this platform. It was originally released digitally on the PlayStation Network in September 2008, before a major expansion pack titled Wipeout HD Fury came in July 2009, followed by a retail version made available in Europe in October that year.

The game revolves around players competing in the FX350 anti-gravity racing league, and features selected tracks from its predecessing PlayStation Portable games Wipeout Pure and Wipeout Pulse, although the content has been upgraded to render 1080p visuals in 60 frames per second, and supports stereoscopic 3D. Wipeout HD was developed by Studio Liverpool, who had desired to release a game for the PlayStation Store to stress that downloadable content was not reserved for smaller games. The game was delayed for a few months due to reports of it failing epilepsy tests.

Wipeout HD and its expansion pack received positive reviews upon release. Critics unanimously praised the game's 1080p visuals, smooth frame rate, and techno soundtrack – a feature many critics recognised as a hallmark of the Wipeout series. The game received controversy over its in-game advertising at the time of the Fury expansion pack's release, with many players complaining of extended loading times due to in-game advertisements. Wipeout HD, along with its Fury expansion pack, was also chosen as a free offering as part of Sony's "Welcome Back" programme due to the 2011 PlayStation Network outage. The expanded Fury version and the subsequent Wipeout 2048 were remastered for PlayStation 4 and released as Wipeout Omega Collection in 2017.

== Gameplay ==
From left to right clockwise, the interface displays the number of laps, shield strength, position, speedometer, and lap time.

Wipeout HD is a racing game in which players compete in the FX350 anti-gravity racing league. The game features a selection of eight tracks originally used in Wipeout Pure and Wipeout Pulse, albeit updated in 1080p visuals and rendered in 60 frames per second. Players pilot anti-gravity ships owned by racing corporations (collectively referred to as "teams" in-game). The base game (excluding the Fury expansion pack) allows participation by up to twelve teams, with six ships each, trophy support, an online mode capable of holding eight players per race, and eight race tracks.

The game has five race modes: the first is a standard single race, which involves the player racing to finish first to earn a gold medal; securing second or third place will reward the player with silver and bronze medals, respectively. Tournament mode consists of four single races in each tournament; the player who earns the most points wins. Time trials and speed laps involve obtaining the fastest time in either three laps or a single lap. The final race mode is called "Zone Mode", in which survival is the goal, as the player's ship increasingly accelerates to extreme speeds. In addition to the five race modes, Wipeout HD provides a "Photo Mode", which can be activated after the player completes a race. In "Photo Mode", the player can take screenshots of the completed race and may change the exposure, saturation, lens focus, or add effects such as depth of field or motion blur.

Every ship in the game has its own characteristics; depending on the team selected, a ship will vary in terms of speed, acceleration, manoeuvrability, and shield strength. Each ship is equipped with an energy shield which absorbs damage sustained; energy is lost whenever the player's ship collides or is hit by weapon fire. If the shield runs out, the ship and player in question will explode, resulting in elimination from the race. However, players may replenish energy by absorbing unwanted weapon pick-ups. The weapons are the same ones featured in Wipeout Pulse; defensive weapons range from shields—which temporarily make the player's ship invulnerable to damage—to land mines and stationary bombs. Offensive weapons include machine guns, missiles, rockets, and a "quake" – which comes in the form of a devastating earthquake that damages all opponents situated in front of the player. In addition, every ship is equipped with air brakes which can be used for manoeuvring through corners at high speed.

An introduction to the series is the Pilot Assist feature. Intended for players new to the series, it is a passive auto-piloting feature that pushes the player away from walls. The strength of this effect is inconsistent, making it undesirable for those trying to set competitive lap times or racing against skilled opponents. Wipeout HD allows players to control their craft by using the motion-sensitive features of the PlayStation 3's Sixaxis controller. Motion control comes in two variants: pitch and steering, or pitch only. The former allows the craft to be totally controlled by moving the controller, while the latter only allows the nose of the craft to be raised or lowered by motion control, with the steering either controlled by an analogue stick or D-pad.

=== Fury expansion pack ===
A major expansion pack titled Wipeout HD Fury was released on the PlayStation Store worldwide on 23 July 2009. The pack consisted of four new race tracks, four "Zone Event" tracks, 13 new ship models, and three new game modes: Eliminator, "Zone Battle" and Detonator. The add-on also included a new 80-event campaign mode, a redesigned menu interface, several new trophies and six new music tracks. Eliminator mode is taken directly from Wipeout Pulse and centres around players destroying other competitors for points and finishing laps. "Zone Battle" is an eight-player version of the normal "Zone Mode". In it, players must fly over zone pads in order to gain enough speed and reach the target. The first player to reach the target wins, therefore ending the game. The final mode is Detonator, in which a single player scores points by shooting mines scattered throughout a race track.

== Development and release ==
The equaliser effects from the "Zone Mode" had to be toned down after it failed epilepsy tests.

Wipeout HD was developed by Liverpudlian developer Studio Liverpool. The studio wanted to take advantage of the PlayStation 3's rendering capabilities to make the game run in full 1080p and 60 frames per second. In a retrospective interview, director Tony Buckley said that the team made the decision to release the game as a PlayStation Store exclusive title before development, to stress that downloadable content does not have to be focused on minor games.

Wipeout HD was first announced during E3 2007, where it was initially said to be a download-only title featuring remastered versions of old race tracks. It was also revealed that the game runs in full high-definition and in 1080p. Later in the year at the Tokyo Game Show, Sony revealed to journalists that the game would be available before the end of 2007, and would include two further game modes that were ultimately not included for the final release. This release was not forthcoming; development continued through 2008, and a shifting release date was eventually finalised in the middle of September 2008, for a release later that month.

The delay from the initial summer time frame was widely reported as being due to a technical issue in development. David Reeves, CEO of Sony Computer Entertainment Europe (SCEE), stated that it was a technical problem with the game that they were yet to solve. Reports soon emerged that the game had failed epilepsy testing, and that it would have to be re-engineered before it could be released. These reports were addressed by a SCEE representative, who claimed that the delay was due to numerous improvements and added features, which included the reverse tracks, four extra ships, two new heads-up displays, the addition of a two-player offline split screen mode, and trophy support. Addressing the reports of health issues, they affirmed that they strongly consider consumer safety and maintain it with frequent care. A comparison video between the preview and final builds later showed greatly toned down equaliser visuals in the game's "Zone Mode". The issues were confirmed when Wipeout HD's director, Tony Buckley, spoke about the tests, saying that although he felt the tests were subjective and the exact issues hard to identify, they took them seriously and that the game has emerged finely with additional features, despite their initial fears that the game would "look poorer as a result".

Wipeout HD, along with its Fury expansion pack, were chosen as a free PlayStation Store offering as part of Sony's "Welcome Back" programme due to the 2011 PlayStation Network outage.

=== In-game advertising update ===
The same update released alongside the Fury expansion pack introduced in-game advertisements, found in the loading screens before a race. This move was met with criticism from gaming news outlets, particularly as the advertisements almost doubled the loading time between levels, and while the game content loads at the same speed, the advert must finish playing before the race can begin. The adverts were removed soon after numerous complaints were made by players. In addition to the load time problems, there had been consternation about advertising being retroactively added into a game that had already been paid for.

== Reception ==
Reception

Aggregate score
Aggregator	Score
Metacritic	87/100

Review scores
Publication	Score
Eurogamer	9/10
GamePro	75%
GameRevolution	B+
GameSpot	7.5/10
GameSpy	4.5/5
Giant Bomb	4/5
VideoGamer.com	9/10
IGN (UK)	9.2/10
IGN (US)	8.5/10
UGO Networks	A−
Jeuxvideo.com	16/20

Wipeout HD received positive reviews on release. It holds an average score of 87 per cent at Metacritic, based on an aggregate of 51 reviews, and also appeared as Metacritic's fourteenth highest ranked PlayStation 3 game of 2008. Wipeout HD was nominated in the "Outstanding Achievement in Sound Design" category during the 12th Annual Interactive Achievement Awards and was also nominated under the racing category for the 28th Golden Joystick Awards.

Critics unanimously praised the graphics and visuals. Martin Robinson from the British IGN thought that the game featured the most sophisticated graphics to date on a downloadable title and applauded the game's futuristic aesthetics, saying that its 1080p visuals and seamless 60 frames per second were matched by significant details that benefit the game. Chris Roper from the American IGN praised the lighting effects and the attention to detail made to the ships and tracks, which he thought was visually impressive in 1080p and 60 frames per second. Dan Whitehead of Eurogamer noted that he was insistent that gameplay is a more important aspect than graphics, but stressed that Wipeout HD's visuals was the most important element. Guy Cocker of GameSpot said that the advanced and glossy 1080p graphics should please new and old fans alike. Furthermore, Cocker opined that "all of the [PlayStation's] horsepower" was concentrated on producing very firm visuals, which he alluded to as one of the reasons for the game's prolonged development time. Tom Orry from VideoGamer.com commended the highly smooth 1080p visuals and detailed HD graphics, saying the game's powerful presentation leads to such appearance. Locke Webster from UGO Networks thought that the efficient visuals and variety of features justified the merits of an expensive downloadable title.

Gabe Graziani of GameSpy praised the presentation, saying that it contained a heavy amount of polished visuals as well as a smooth frame rate, and summarised that it updated the PSP titles Wipeout Pure and Wipeout Pulse to HD "magnificently". Jesse Costantino of Game Revolution said that Wipeout HD "joins an elite class of current-gen racers" due to its 1080p visuals and a nearly constant 60 frames per second. Costantino also praised the richly detailed environments of the race tracks, stating that he felt like they were made in real life. Frédéric Goyon of Jeuxvideo.com said Wipeout HD was atypically a large attainment regarding its visuals, and also thought the combined colour choices made it a visually unique racing game. Ryan Davis from Giant Bomb praised the game's transition to HD, stating that he wondered how the Wipeout series treated graphics without 1080p visuals prior to the release of Wipeout HD. In addition, Davis also commended the ship design and very solid frame rate. Terry Terrones of GamePro said that the game was visually stunning, but also implied that it was "essentially a pig with lipstick".

The techno soundtrack and general audio were also praised by critics. Robinson recognised that techno music featured played an important part in the Wipeout series, opining that the entire game is set to a traditional pounding soundtrack. Additionally, Robinson enjoyed how the music was filtered out each time the player performed an airborne jump. Roper similarly acknowledged that soundtracks have always been an integral part of the Wipeout franchise, and said that the music tracks in Wipeout HD fits well with both visuals and the overall racing experience by blending into the background. Regarding the sound effects, Roper noted that not many of them appear, although he appreciated the few ones that are in the game. Cocker felt that the game's soundtrack was enjoyable for fans of electronica, although he liked the fact that players could import their own playlists to the game, an aspect he thought that introduced more variation. In cohesion with other critics, Cocker recognised that music was important to the franchise, and commended the mix of techno, dubstep, and drum and bass soundtracks. Orry stated that the game featured a "brilliant" soundtrack, and also commended its integrated custom soundtrack support. Goyon praised the electro-orientated music, stating that the sound is suitable for the futuristic universe of Wipeout, and also enjoyed the idea of playing customised music if the player did not like the standard soundtrack. Although Davis noted the lack of successful artists like The Prodigy, Daft Punk, or The Chemical Brothers (all of whom were featured in Wipeout 2097), he did acknowledge that there were still "plenty of chilly synths" and throbbing background beats to listen to.
