= Pacer (video game) =

2017 video game

- Re-release cover art
- Developer: R8 Games
- Publisher: R8 Games
- Director: Clive Anderson
- Producer: Steve Iles
- Designer: Carlton Gaunt
- Programmer: Marcus Matusiak
- Artist: William Goodwill
- Composers: Tim Wright, Stafford Bawler
- Platforms: Windows; PlayStation 4; Xbox One
- Release: 31 May 2017 (Win); 29 October 2020 (PS4, XB)
- Genre: Racing
- Modes: Single-player, multiplayer

Pacer, originally titled Formula Fusion, is a futuristic racing game by R8 Games. The game was released for the Windows in May 2017. It was ported to the PlayStation 4 and Xbox One in October 2020.

== Development and release ==
The game started as a spiritual successor to the Wipeout series with some of the early R8 Games staff having worked on Wipeout 3 for Psygnosis Leeds. R8 Games founder Andrew Walker was part of the team that were awarded a BAFTA for best design on Wipeout 3 in 1999. The Designers Republic, the graphic design studio that designed visual assets and marketing for the first three Wipeout games, has also contributed to the game.

The game uses the Unreal 4 game engine with modifications to the open source code to enhance the feeling of speed.

Formula Fusion was announced in September 2014. A Kickstarter campaign by British studio R8 Games was successful in securing over £79,000 to begin development on the game which was released as an early access version through Steam in August 2015. The game was re-branded from Formula Fusion to Pacer in early 2019.

The console versions were initially set to release on September 17, 2020. However, they were delayed until the end of September 2020. On October 19, R8 announced that they would be released on October 29.

== Reception ==
Reception

Aggregate score
Aggregator	Score
Metacritic	(PC, original) 58/100 (PC, re-release) 70/100 (PS4) 77/100 (XONE) 79/100

Review scores
Publication	Score
Computer Games Magazine	6.5/10
Hardcore Gamer	4/5
Push Square	7/10

Formula Fusion received very mixed reviews upon exiting early access. Critics praised the graphics, the sound, and claimed that the game felt very true to the Wipeout series, while heavily criticizing the insubstantial amount of content as well as unforeseen bugs. Many critics claimed that the game felt unfinished and not ready for full release outside of early access.

Pacer opened to more positive reception, receiving "mixed or average" reviews for PC and "generally positive" reviews for PlayStation 4 and Xbox One.

CGM lamented the game's lack of accessibility, online player-base, and controls, while praising the game's soundtrack, graphics, customization, and its ability to live up to the legacy of Wipeout. Hardcore Gamer wrote positively about the game, stating, "Fans of either F-Zero or Wipeout will undeniably and thoroughly enjoy PACER...The game is fast and beautiful and offers more depth with a variety of racing" while criticizing the lack of online functionality and purchasable in-game content. Push Square praised the wide variety of modes and content, and speedy gameplay while criticizing the forgettable racing teams and the UI, calling it "clumsy".
