= Extreme-G 3 =

2001 video game

XGIII: Extreme G Racing
- North American cover art for the PlayStation 2 version
- Developer: Acclaim Studios Cheltenham
- Publisher: Acclaim Entertainment
- Platforms: PlayStation 2, GameCube
- Release: PlayStation 2: NA: 21 August 2001; EU: 31 August 2001; GameCube: NA: 27 November 2001; EU: 3 May 2002; AU: 17 May 2002
- Genre: Racing
- Modes: Single-player, multiplayer

XGIII: Extreme G Racing, also known as Extreme-G 3, is a racing video game developed by Acclaim Studios Cheltenham and published by Acclaim Entertainment for the PlayStation 2 and GameCube. This game serves as a sequel to Extreme-G 2 and is followed by XGRA: Extreme-G Racing Association.

== Gameplay ==
Screenshot of gameplay

The game portrays the sport of "Extreme-G" racing set in the 23rd century. Players assume the role of one of twelve riders competing in a championship, with each rider representing one of six teams of two. The career mode begins in the slowest class, 250G, and as players progress, they can eventually advance to the 1000G class, which is the fastest in the game.

The sound barrier mechanics from Extreme-G 2 are retained in this installment.

The game features 10 tracks, complete with twists, drops, and sharp turns. Extreme-G 3 introduces a new approach to weaponry, leading to a significant shift in gameplay from its predecessors. Unlike the first two games, where players could pick up weapons on the track without consuming their primary weapon bar, in the third game, players purchase weapons using money earned from races, and firing these weapons depletes a small portion of the weapon bar for each shot. Compared to earlier installments, Extreme-G 3 offers a reduced selection of weapons.

== Reception ==
Reception

Aggregate score
Aggregator	Score	
Aggregator	GameCube	PS2
Metacritic	83/100	81/100

Review scores
Publication	Score	
Publication	GameCube	PS2
Edge	N/A	6/10
Electronic Gaming Monthly	N/A	6/10, 6/10, 6.5/10, 6.5/10
EP Daily	N/A	8/10
Famitsu	6/10, 6/10, 7/10, 7/10	N/A
Game Informer	8.25/10	8/10
GameRevolution	B	N/A
GameSpot	8.6/10	8.5/10
GameSpy	83%	N/A
GameZone	8.4/10	9/10
IGN	8.5/10	8.4/10
Next Generation	N/A	3/5
Nintendo Power	3.4/5	N/A
Official U.S. PlayStation Magazine	N/A	4/5
Maxim	N/A	7/10

Extreme-G 3 received "favorable" reviews on both platforms, according to the review aggregation website Metacritic. Gary Whitta of NextGen described the PlayStation 2 version as a solid title for fans of Wipeout-style racers.

Iron Monkey of GamePro noted that the PlayStation 2 version "boasts sizzling speeds and enough thumb-crushing intensity to keep futuristic racing fans satiated until Wipeout Fusion arrives." (Note: GamePro awarded the PlayStation 2 version two 4.5/5 scores for graphics and control, along with two 4/5 scores for sound and fun factor.) Star Dingo later described the GameCube version as "a hyper-fun, super-polished, vertigo-inducing thrill ride that will rush plenty of adrenaline through your veins... for a while, anyway." (Note: GamePro gave the GameCube version two 4.5/5 scores for graphics and control, and two 4/5 scores for sound and fun factor.)

The PlayStation 2 version was nominated for the "Best Driving Game" award at GameSpot's Best and Worst of 2002 Awards, which ultimately went to Gran Turismo 3: A-Spec. The game was also nominated at The Electric Playground's 2001 Blister Awards for "Best Sound in a Console Game," "Best Console Driving Game," and "GameCube Game of the Year" (though not reviewed), but lost to Star Wars: Obi-Wan, Grand Theft Auto III, and Star Wars Rogue Squadron II: Rogue Leader, respectively.
