= Nick Phillips (graphic designer) =

British graphic designer

- Born: Nicholas Phillips; 1962 (age 63–64)
- Occupation: Graphic designer
- Known for: Co-founder, Designers Republic; BAFTA award for Wip3out; Organ player in World of Twist

Nick Phillips is a graphic designer who co-founded The Designers Republic and has produced award-winning work for Sony games.

== Background ==
Phillips studied sculpture at Sheffield Hallam's Psalter Lane college. He played organ in an early line-up of World of Twist. Through the Sheffield music scene, Phillips became friends with graphic designer Ian Anderson. Together they set up The Designers Republic in July 1986.

== Career ==
=== The Designers Republic ===
As a duo, Phillips and Anderson have been described as 'the design gurus associated with electronic music'. They produced album artwork for artists such as Pop Will Eat Itself, Pulp, Supergrass, The Orb, and Warp Records including Aphex Twin. Q magazine included a Designers Republic sleeve in their list of the 100 Best Record Covers of All Time.

Work by Phillips and Anderson is held in the permanent collections of MoMA and the V&A.

=== Other work ===
Phillips went on to help design the Sony Psygnosis game Wip3out, which won the BAFTA Interactive Entertainment Award for Best Design in 1999.

His cover for Richard Hawley Lady's Bridge was nominated for Best Art Vinyl in 2007.

Phillips worked on the first editions of SingStar, and on Sony's EyeToy. Other games credits include Wipeout 3: Special Edition, Global Domination, Conflict: Denied Ops, Pilot Academy, the LMA Manager series and Lemmings Revolution.

Phillips now works solo, producing sleeve art for Richard Hawley. He has done design work for Sheffield Doc/Fest and LoveBox Festival and Adelaide Fringe Festival.
