= Wipeout (video game series) =

Video game racing series

- Genre: Racing
- Developer: Psygnosis
- Publishers: Psygnosis; Sony Interactive Entertainment
- Platforms: PlayStation, Sega Saturn, Nintendo 64, PlayStation 2, PlayStation Portable, PlayStation 3, PlayStation Vita, PlayStation 4, Amiga, Android, iOS
- First release: Wipeout; 29 September 1995
- Latest release: Wipeout Merge; 18 January 2022

Wipeout (stylised as wipE′out″ or WipEout) is a series of futuristic anti-gravity racing video games created by Psygnosis (later known as Studio Liverpool). Sony Interactive Entertainment owns the series and publishes most of the games.

The series is characterised by its fast-paced gameplay, cutting-edge 3D visuals that maximise the resolution capabilities of the game's console, and its association with electronic dance music, particularly big beat-infused techno and trance. This includes collaborations with prominent electronic artists such as The Chemical Brothers, The Prodigy, Leftfield, Orbital, Underworld, Fluke, and the in-house composer CoLD SToRAGE. Additionally, the series’ graphic design identity—crafted by The Designers Republic for the first three games—helped establish its signature Y2K futurism and rave aesthetic.

The concept of Wipeout was first discussed during a pub conversation, when a Psygnosis staff member, Jim Bowers, envisioned creating a futuristic racing game which featured anti-gravity ships. Some game design elements were influenced by Matrix Marauders, a 1990 Amiga game also developed by Psygnosis. A beta version of Wipeout appeared in the cult film Hackers, in which the protagonists are shown playing the game in a nightclub. This appearance is cited as a catalyst for Sony's acquisition of Psygnosis in the months following the release of Hackers.

The Wipeout franchise has been well received by critics, with Wipeout 2097 in particular being listed among the PlayStation's best games. Wipeout 2048 was the last game to be developed by Studio Liverpool prior to their closure in August 2012. The series was later given a remaster called Wipeout Omega Collection, which released in 2017.

== Gameplay ==
A screenshot from Wipeout HD. The series revolves around players piloting anti-gravity ships through futuristic race environments.

The Wipeout games are a series of futuristic racers that involve players piloting anti-gravity ships through various forms of races. The series is known for its extreme speed, range of electronic dance music soundtracks, and consequential difficulty.

Power-ups come in the form of offensive or defensive weaponry, ranging from machine guns, missiles, mines and rockets to energy shields, autopilots, and turbo boosts. These power-ups are usually collected by flying over coloured X-shaped pads on race tracks. Chevron-shaped speed pads also feature prominently on race tracks: once flown over, the player's ship receives a momentary boost.

Every ship featured in a game is owned by a different racing team, although the number of teams and ships will vary throughout the games. Each ship has different characteristics; for example, ships will vary in handling, thrust, top speed, shield strength, and occasionally firepower. Every ship is equipped with a compulsory shield that absorbs damage sustained during a race; energy is lost whenever the player's ship collides or is hit by weapon fire. If damage is sustained after the shield's depletion, the ship in question will explode and the pilot is consequently eliminated from the race.

The games' campaign modes usually consist of single races, time trials, and tournaments.

- Standard single races involve the player competing against opponents to finish first and win a gold medal. As scoring is podium-based, silver and bronze medals are awarded for second and third place, respectively.
- Tournaments typically contain four or eight single races each; points are scored based on position for each race, and the pilot who accumulates the most points wins.
- Time trials and speed laps have the player obtaining the fastest time on a track in either a predetermined number of laps or an individual lap, respectively.
- "Zone" mode has been featured in every game since Wipeout Fusion and revolves around survival as the player automatically accelerates to extreme speeds. The mode will only end upon the destruction of the player's ship.
- "Eliminator" mode was introduced in Wipeout 3 and centres around pilots gaining points for damaging competitors and finishing laps.
- "Combat" mode is a slight variation of Eliminator and appears only in Wipeout 2048. The difference between the two is that in Combat, energy is restored through item absorption as opposed to completing a lap.

== Games ==
Release timeline
1995	Wipeout
1996	Wipeout 2097
1997
1998	Wipeout 64
1999	Wipeout 3
2000
2001
2002	Wipeout Fusion
2003
2004
2005	Wipeout Pure
2006
2007	Wipeout Pulse
2008	Wipeout HD
2009
2010
2011
2012	Wipeout 2048
2013	Wipeout 2D
2014
2015
2016
2017	Wipeout Omega Collection
2018
2019
2020
2021	Wipeout Merge

=== Wipeout ===
Wipeout (stylised as wipE'out") is a futuristic racing video game developed and published by Psygnosis. It is the first game in the series and was originally released for the PlayStation and PCs running MS-DOS in 1995, and for the Sega Saturn the following year. It was also a launch title for the PlayStation in Europe and North America. Set in the year 2052, players compete in the F3600 anti-gravity racing league, piloting one of a selection of craft in races on several different tracks around the world.

Wipeout featured music from well-known electronic artists such as Leftfield, The Chemical Brothers, and Orbital. A prototype version of the game appeared in the teen cult film Hackers (1995), in which both protagonists were playing the game in a nightclub. A marketing campaign created and launched by Keith Hopwood and graphic design studio The Designers Republic included an infamous promotional poster featuring a bloodstained Radio 1 DJ Sara Cox, which was speculated by some of representing a drug overdose.

=== Wipeout 2097 ===
Wipeout 2097 (stylised as wipE'out"2^{0}97; released as Wipeout XL in North America) is the second game of the franchise and is a direct sequel to the original game. It was first released worldwide in 1996 for the PlayStation, and for the Sega Saturn in the following year. Set in the year 2097, the game revolves around players racing in the F5000 anti-gravity racing league. The game was first unveiled to the public in the form of a pre-alpha demo at the Electronic Entertainment Expo in May 1996. The soundtrack featured a wider array of high-profile electronic music artists. Tracks by The Prodigy, Fluke, Underworld, and Photek were included, alongside returning contributors Leftfield and The Chemical Brothers.

=== Wipeout 64 ===
Wipeout 64 is the third installment of the series. It was released exclusively for the Nintendo 64 in November 1998 for North America, and later in 1999 for Europe. The game is set one year after the events of Wipeout 2097 and shares the same anti-gravity racing league.

Wipeout 64 reuses most of the race tracks featured in the previous games, albeit with mirrored layouts and different locations.

=== Wipeout 3 ===
Wipeout 3 (stylised as wip3out in Europe and Japan) is the fourth title in the franchise and was first released in September 1999 for the PlayStation, where players race in the F7200 league. An enhanced edition entitled Wipeout 3 Special Edition was released exclusively in Europe on 14 July 2000; featuring minor changes to gameplay, such as different craft physics, auto-loading of saves and artificial intelligence bug fixes. As with the first two games, Psygnosis once again hired The Designers Republic to assist in development. The Sheffield-based company, known for its underground techno album covers, provided "visual candy" to Wipeout 3's graphics, designing the game's icons, billboards, and colour schemes.

The game also featured music from Propellerheads, and with The Chemical Brothers and Orbital, returning from the first Wipeout. Psygnosis selected DJ Sasha to serve as the game's music director.

=== Wipeout Fusion ===
Wipeout Fusion (stylised as wipEout fusion) is the fifth instalment of the series and was first released on the PlayStation 2 in 2002. The game was the first to be developed by the newly renamed Studio Liverpool. It is set in the year 2160 and revolves around players competing in the corrupt F9000 anti-gravity racing league. After the success of the previous games, the development team wanted to target Wipeout Fusion at an "older, savvier crowd" by making it stand out from the F-Zero series, which some critics had often compared it to.

=== Wipeout Pure ===
Wipeout Pure (stylised as wipE'out pṳre) is the sixth game in the series and was released simultaneously with the launch of the PlayStation Portable in 2005. The game takes place in the year 2197, exactly 100 years after Wipeout 2097, and centres around players competing in the FX300 anti-gravity racing league.

Development of the game started in August 2003 and lasted until early 2005. Throughout production, the Liverpudlian studio created new user interfaces and other algorithms that helped speed up the development process in time for the PlayStation Portable's launch. The game was notable for showcasing the PlayStation Portable's graphical capabilities, and marked the first time a Wipeout game featured downloadable content—an aspect which had the potential to draw in more revenue for Studio Liverpool.

=== Wipeout Pulse ===
Wipeout Pulse (stylised as wipEout pulse) is the seventh instalment and was first released for the PlayStation Portable in 2007. A port for the PlayStation 2 was released exclusively in Europe in June 2009, featuring enhanced graphics and all of the game's downloadable content. The game takes place one year after the events of Wipeout Pure and has players compete in the FX400 anti-gravity racing league. Development of the game was centred around focusing on the feedback left by fans on the previous game, with many fans complaining of Wipeout Pure's difficulty, thus prompting Studio Liverpool to improve on aspects where they had thought they failed. The game features sixteen licensed music tracks from techno artists, including Kraftwerk, DJ Fresh, and Skream.

=== Wipeout HD ===
Wipeout HD (stylised as WipEout HD) is the eighth title in the franchise and is the first to be released on the PS3 via PlayStation Network worldwide in 2008, although a retail version was later released exclusively in Europe the next year. A major expansion pack titled Wipeout HD Fury was released worldwide via the PlayStation Network in July 2009. This time, players compete in the FX350 anti-gravity racing league, set a year prior to the FX400 league, featuring a handful of race tracks from Wipeout Pure and Wipeout Pulse (although all content has been upgraded to render 1080p visuals in 60 frames per second).

According to the game's director, the team made the decision to release the game as a PlayStation Store exclusive title before development in order to stress that downloadable content did not have to be focused on "small games". Wipeout HD's expansion pack, Fury, received controversy over its in-game advertising, with many players complaining of extended loading times, as well as consternation about advertising being retroactively added into a game that had already been paid for. The advertisements were removed soon after several complaints were made by players. The game was also chosen as a free PlayStation Store offering as part of Sony's "Welcome Back" program due to the 2011 PlayStation Network outage.

=== Wipeout 2048 ===
Wipeout 2048 is the ninth and final game in the series to be developed by Studio Liverpool prior to their closure in August 2012. The game was released as a launch title for the PlayStation Vita in early 2012 and centres around players competing in the first Anti-Gravity Racing Championships. It is set in the year 2048 and acts as a prequel to the first Wipeout game. Wipeout 2048 was developed alongside the PlayStation Vita console itself, and acted as a "testbed" for the device. When the staff of the Liverpudlian studio were given development kits for what was then dubbed a "Next Generation Portable", a group was set up within the team to brainstorm ideas. Among these included the proposal of a touchscreen device, which was not yet conceived by Sony at the time, and two analogue sticks—both features eventually made it onto the console.

=== Wipeout 2D ===
Wipeout 2D was released in 2013 on PlayStation Vita as part of the PlayStation Home Arcade.

=== Wipeout Omega Collection ===
Wipeout Omega Collection (stylised as WipE'out'' OMEGA COLLECTION) is a remaster of the previous two titles in the Wipeout series: Wipeout HD (with its Wipeout HD Fury expansion) and Wipeout 2048. Wipeout HD itself contained content from Wipeout Pure and Wipeout Pulse. The game was developed by Clever Beans, EPOS Game Studios, and XDev. Wipeout Omega Collection was released in June 2017. It was designed to be run at 1080p on the PlayStation 4 and 4K on the PlayStation 4 Pro, both at 60 frames per second.

=== Wipeout Merge ===
Wipeout Merge (previously known as Wipeout Rush) was announced by publisher Rogue Games on September 16, 2021 for iOS and Android devices. The game initially soft-launched in several regions throughout late 2021, and launched in the United States in early 2022. The game features over 60 ships from the series as well as a full single-player campaign. Unlike previous entries in the series, the gameplay consists of being a racing "manager," and timing the deployment of weapons during races.

== Development ==
From starting from a conversation in a pub, to a test video for a movie, to a piece of unknown hardware documented only in Japanese, to then, twelve months later having a working game on the shelf – it was an astonishing achievement.

— Nick Burcombe in a retrospective interview with Eurogamer.

All games in the Wipeout franchise, except for Wipeout Merge, were developed by Studio Liverpool. (Note: Although all Wipeout titles have been developed by Studio Liverpool before their closure, Wipeout Omega Collection was developed by various other studios (despite the original games featured within the collection being developed by Studio Liverpool).) The conceptualisation of Wipeout revolved around Psygnosis designer Nick Burcombe's idea of creating a racing game using the same types of anti-gravity vehicles featured in Powerdrome, a title first released on the Atari ST in 1988. The game's futuristic vehicle designs were influenced by Matrix Marauders, a 1994 Amiga 3D racing game conceptualised by fellow Psygnosis employee Jim Bowers. The name "Wipeout" was decided upon during a pub conversation and was inspired by the instrumental song "Wipe Out" by The Surfaris.

After the beta version of Wipeout appeared in the cult film Hackers, Sony expressed interest in Psygnosis due to the "impressive work" the studio had produced with 3D graphics. In September 1995, Sony acquired the Liverpool-based company outright. The inclusion of a licensed soundtrack featuring big beat-infused electronic music, including artists like Leftfield, The Chemical Brothers, and Orbital, became a defining feature of the Wipeout series. This musical approach was inspired by designer Nick Burcombe's experience of playing Super Mario Kart while listening to tracks by The Prodigy, which led him to envision a racing game that captured the energy and attitude of 1990s electronic music culture.

Subsequent development of Wipeout 2097 spanned seven months, and a nightclub tour in conjunction with Red Bull was set up to advertise the game. The game's art, in-game branding, and packaging were made by Sheffield-based The Designers Republic, contributing to its distinctive style.

For the development of Wipeout 3, Psygnosis once again hired The Designers Republic to assist in development. Lead artist Nicky Westcott wanted to make the game look like a "believable future" to retain a realistic sensibility. Wipeout 3 also featured a curated electronic soundtrack to complement its style, further cementing the franchise's reputation for integrating music and gameplay. It was also the first game to benefit from the PlayStation's analogue sticks, which were used to offer smoother control of the player's craft.

Pre-production of Wipeout Pure began in August 2003 and full production commenced in October of that year. The team received development kits of the then-upcoming PlayStation Portable the following year, and was made aware that Wipeout Pure was going to be a launch title for that console. During development, Studio Liverpool created user interfaces and custom plugins for 3D computer graphics software entirely from scratch in order to help speed up the process.

Wipeout HD was first announced during E3 2007, and was revealed to be a downloadable-only title. The game's director, Tony Buckley, said in a retrospective interview that the studio made the decision to release the game as a PlayStation Store exclusive title before development. There was a significant delay when reports emerged that the game's Zone Mode had failed epilepsy testing, and that it would have to be redesigned before it could be released.

Wipeout 2048 was developed in parallel with the PlayStation Vita itself, and had acted as a "testbed" for the console. The development of the game influenced the design of the console itself; staff from the Liverpudlian studio were sent to brainstorm ideas to senior management at Sony. Among these ideas included the proposal of a touchscreen device—which was not yet conceived at the time—as well as the inclusion of two sticks.

On 8 August 2012, Sony officially shut down Studio Liverpool as part of an effort to focus on alternative investment plans. At the time of their closure, the studio was working on a future Wipeout title for the PlayStation 4, which was reported to have been in development for 12 to 18 months.

== Reception ==
Aggregate review scores
Game	Metacritic
Wipeout	(PS1) 90% (Note: GameRankings score) (SAT) 78%
Wipeout 2097	(PS1) 96/100 (PC) 71%
Wipeout 64	(N64) 84/100
Wipeout 3	(PS1) 89/100
Wipeout Fusion	(PS2) 83/100
Wipeout Pure	(PSP) 88/100
Wipeout Pulse	(PSP) 82/100
Wipeout HD	(PS3) 87/100
Wipeout 2048	(Vita) 79/100
Wipeout Omega Collection	(PS4) 85/100

The Wipeout series has been well received by critics. Its fast-paced gameplay, high-quality visuals, and prominent techno soundtracks have been cited as hallmarks of the series. Upon release, the first Wipeout game was widely praised for its electronica soundtrack, originality, and outstanding visuals; however, a critic at the time questioned its longevity and potential to hold a long lifespan in comparison to Super Mario Kart. In retrospect, Wipeout was described as being synonymous with Sony's debut gaming hardware and as an early showcase for 3D graphics in console gaming. The game also increased awareness of the underground techno community in England, as it was one of the first games to include licensed music.

The second instalment of the series, Wipeout 2097, was released to critical acclaim. Reviewers unanimously commended its innovation, graphics, and unique blend of techno music. IGN ranked it as the 13th best PlayStation game of all time in 2002, and The Official PlayStation Magazine named it as the fifth best in 1997. In addition, Wipeout 2097 also ranks as the fourth best PlayStation game of all time at GameRankings. Wipeout 64 received generally positive reviews, with some critics asserting that it was a superior game to F-Zero X in regards to graphics, atmosphere, and track design, though others noted that it did not reach the standards of its predecessor, Wipeout 2097.

The fourth instalment of the series, Wipeout 3, was positively received upon release; critics lauded the graphics, fast-paced gameplay, and music, although many reviews felt that the game's steep learning curve was a major fault. Wipeout Fusion was more negatively received by critics; the graphics received mixed responses, with one reviewer saying that it looked like an "early first generation PS2 game", despite another opining that the visuals had improved over all of its predecessors. At the time of Wipeout Fusion's release in 2001, critics recognised the fact that techno music was an integral part of the series.

Wipeout Pure and Wipeout Pulse both received very positive reviews upon release, with critics praising their visual effects, attention to detail, and track design. Wipeout HD, along with its Fury expansion pack, also received very positive reviews, with many critics agreeing that it offered the best visual representation of any Wipeout game due to it being upscaled in full 1080p and rendered in 60 frames per second. It was nominated for the "Outstanding Achievement in Sound Design" category in the 12th Annual Interactive Achievement Awards and was also nominated under the racing category for the 28th Golden Joystick Awards. The final instalment in the franchise to be developed by Studio Liverpool, Wipeout 2048, received generally positive reviews despite it being the lowest ranked game overall. Critics cohesively commended the graphics and visuals, and also regarded it as a showcase for the PlayStation Vita's power.

== See also ==
- F-Zero, another anti-gravity racing game series that debuted in 1990 on the Super NES
- Pacer, 2020, PlayStation 4

== Bibliography ==
- Psygnosis (1997). Wipeout 2048 Sega Saturn instruction manual. Psygnosis. pp. 2–36.
- Psygnosis (1998). Wipeout 64 instruction manual. Midway Games. pp. 2–14.
- Studio Liverpool (2002). Wipeout Fusion instruction manual. Sony Computer Entertainment. pp. 1–32.
- Studio Liverpool (2005). Wipeout Pure instruction manual. Sony Computer Entertainment. pp. 2–24.
- Studio Liverpool (2007). Wipeout Pulse instruction manual. Sony Computer Entertainment. pp. 2–22.
- Studio Liverpool (2008). Wipeout HD/Fury instruction manual (retail version). Sony Computer Entertainment. pp. 2–18.
