= Wipeout 2048 =

2012 video game

- European box art
- Developer: Studio Liverpool
- Publisher: Sony Computer Entertainment
- Director: Stuart Tilley
- Producer: Martin Harrow
- Designer: Karl Jones
- Programmers: Stuart Lovegrove; Chris Roberts
- Artists: Lee Carus-Wescott; Marcus Tanner
- Series: Wipeout
- Platform: PlayStation Vita
- Release: JP: 19 January 2012; NA: 15 February 2012; EU: 22 February 2012
- Genre: Racing
- Modes: Single-player, multiplayer

Wipeout 2048 is a 2012 racing video game developed by Studio Liverpool and published by Sony Computer Entertainment for the PlayStation Vita. The ninth installment of the Wipeout series, it was a launch game for the console. It was also the last game to be developed by Studio Liverpool before its closure as well as the last mainline Wipeout title.

As the title implies, Wipeout 2048 is a prequel to the original 1995 Wipeout and is set in the years 2048, 2049, and 2050. The game was designed as a testbed for the PlayStation Vita. Studio Liverpool's feedback on the console's features, including the addition of a rear touchscreen and two separate joysticks, were contributive to the Vita's final design. Wipeout 2048 preserves some technical aspects of its predecessor game Wipeout HD, including downloadable content (DLC), online multiplayer mode, and cross-platform play with PlayStation 3 owners running Wipeout HD.

Wipeout 2048 received mainly positive reviews; critics said its graphics and visuals showcased the power of the then-new PlayStation Vita but criticised its long loading times and other technical problems. The game, together with Wipeout HD and its Fury expansion, was remastered for PlayStation 4 and released as Wipeout Omega Collection in 2017.

== Gameplay ==
From left to right clockwise, the interface displays the lap and time, current position, number of experience points, speedometer, shield strength and current weapon.

Wipeout 2048 is a racing game in which players pilot anti-gravity ships through a variety of scenarios. It is set primarily in 2048 and is a prequel to the first installment of the Wipeout series. Dedicated racetracks have not been built yet, so most races are held on the streets of the fictitious Nova State City. The single-player campaign progresses through the first three years of the Anti-Gravity Racing Championships (AGRC) in 2048, 2049, and 2050. The game includes four types of ships; speed, agility, fighter, and prototype. Speed-class ships typically have higher top speeds and good handling, but weak shields and weapon systems. Agility-class ships have sharp, responsive handling and decent combat capabilities, but aren't too fast. Fighter-class ships sacrifice top speed and handling for durability and firepower. Finally, Prototype ships take a statistic and exaggerate it to extreme levels. For example, the Pir-Hana prototype ship is extremely fast in a straight line but is incapable of steering (being reliant entirely on airbrakes) or slowing down. Each ship is owned by one of five racing teams, and each team has a specific statistic that their ships excel in regardless of ship class.

During races, numerous weapons may be picked up by flying over coloured weapon pads. Yellow pads equip the player with offensive weaponry that can be used to destroy other racers whereas green pads provide defensive weapons such as mines, shields, and speed boosts. Game modes including one-on-one races, tournaments, time trials, speed laps, and Zone mode—which revolves around survival as the player's ship automatically accelerates to extreme speeds—have been carried over from Wipeout HD.

The online multiplayer mode has the same races and modes as the single-player version. The online multiplayer is cross-platform, allowing players using the PlayStation 3 version of Wipeout HD Fury to play the Fury tracks with the PlayStation Vita. Wipeout 2048 also includes downloadable content (DLC); two DLC packages each offer twelve tracks and twelve ships for cross-platform play.

== Development ==
=== Conception ===
Studio Liverpool's technical director Stuart Lovegrove said Wipeout 2048 was developed in parallel with the PlayStation Vita handheld gaming console and was a testbed for it. Lovegrove was aware the next Wipeout would be a launch game and said Studio Liverpool had made one before. Chris Roberts, the game's director of graphics, tools and technologies, said Sony Computer Entertainment involved Studio Liverpool at an early stage in the development of the PlayStation Vita and he had a "fairly good idea" of its capabilities. Jon Eggleton, former senior artist of the Wipeout series, said Studio Liverpool influenced the Vita's design. When staff were given development kits for a "next-generation portable [console]", a group was formed to brainstorm hardware details; proposals included a touchscreen device that was not yet conceived by Sony. Eggleton speculated the console was released with two analogue joysticks solely because "Studio Liverpool said it needed two sticks". During early development of Wipeout 2048 and the PlayStation Vita, the studio provided Sony with feedback on the hardware and its libraries, and sent updated application source code to Sony's firmware staff to test their compilers. Lovegrove and Roberts were impressed with the simplicity of the Vita's firmware, which was in contrast to the architecture of the PlayStation 3 home console.

=== Design ===
The Wipeout 2048 development team recognised the PlayStation Vita and the PlayStation 3 are different. Lovegrove said designing for the Vita's smaller screen made it easier to develop, avoiding earlier problems of designing a game targeted for an HD screen but the studio had to ensure the game could run at any resolution. Roberts said, "it [was] less of a headache for artists" who wanted to tweak lighting effects. Roberts said the "most obvious" difference between the PlayStation 3's RSX Reality Synthesizer graphics processing unit (GPU) and the PlayStation Vita's ARM architecture is the Vita's lack of stream processing units (SPU). He said most of Wipeout HD's SPU code was directed towards GPU support, which includes geometry culling, lighting effects and rendering. According to Roberts, the Vita's GPU and ARM architecture are more capable than the PS3 and handled Wipeout 2048 easily. Lovegrove, who had worked with the ARM architecture on the BBC Micro, said the team did not have to optimise anything to accomplish their goals and that it was enjoyable to see the ARM architecture running the game.

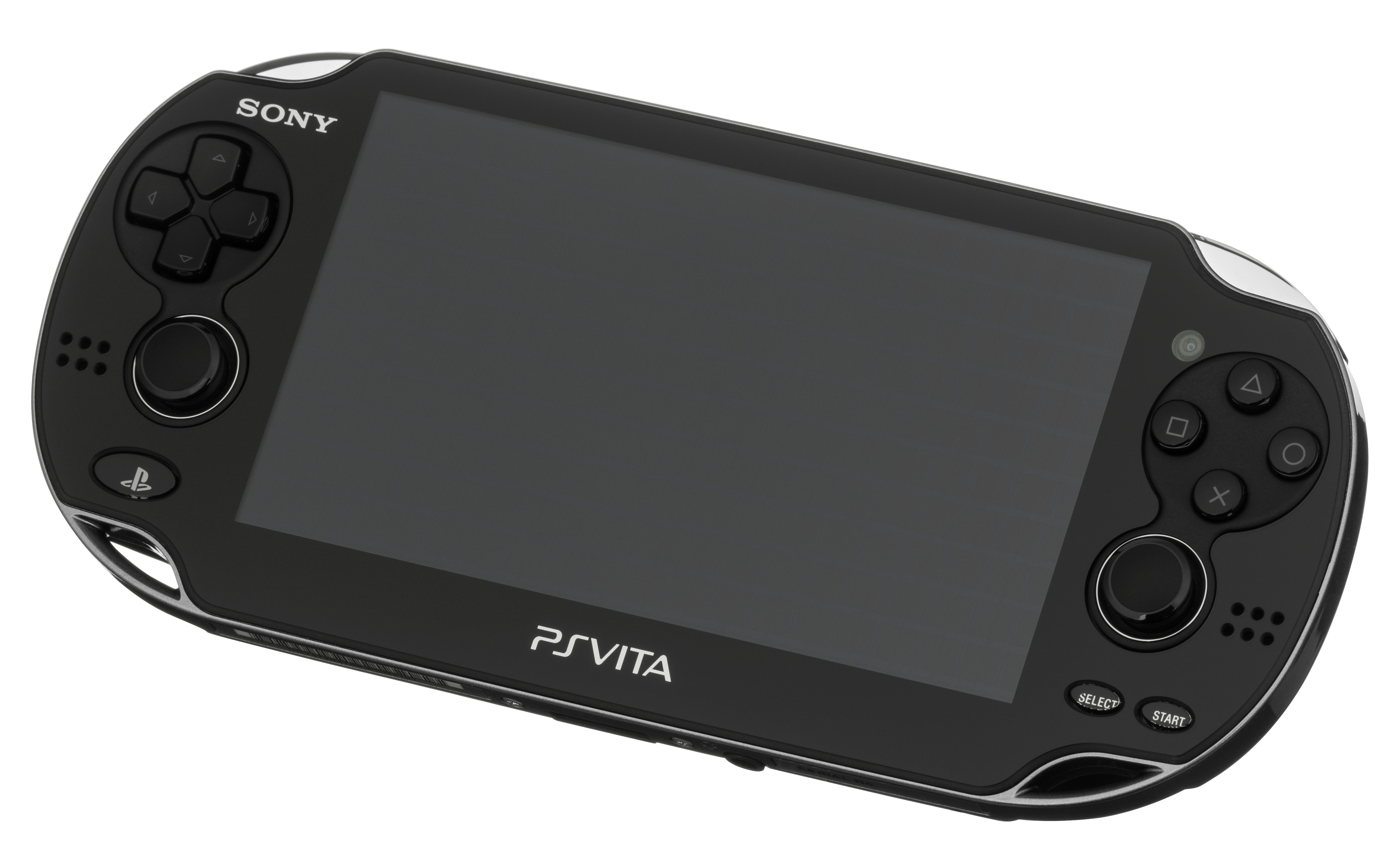
The game's development influenced the design of the PlayStation Vita console (first version pictured).

Although Wipeout 2048 and Wipeout HD have a shared shader program and did not require retooling for the Vita's architecture, Roberts said fine-tuning the shader effects for the Vita's GPU took significant time and attention. Lovegrove thought the method of working on a PlayStation 3 and its handheld counterpart was identical—a sentiment generally shared by the team—and Roberts said similarities between the systems helped the team "get moving quickly". Roberts added that the lighting system is identical to that of Wipeout HD; both games' ships share image-based lighting with blended, diffuse and specular highlights and effects, and the vertex-based lighting system used for weaponry. According to Roberts, the main difference is the PlayStation Vita's use of the effects via the GPU whereas the PlayStation 3 relies on SPUs. The team decided to use anti-aliased colour buffers rather than depth buffers for real-time shadow rendering, creating better transparency effects because the memory cost of anti-aliasing is eight bits per pixel so 4x multisample anti-aliasing (MSAA) buffers contain the same amount of memory as a 32-bit depth buffer. Roberts also considered tone mapping an improvement, partly because of the Vita's superior support of buffer formats, which gives Wipeout 2048 better exposure control and bloom effects.

To accommodate the visual fidelity, the team compromised on the frame rate. Roberts said the decision was made early in development since they initially expected the PlayStation Vita could run PlayStation 3 assets at 30 frames per second (fps). The team used code from Wipeout HD as a reference to make the development process more efficient; the art and technical teams of Studio Liverpool worked in parallel. Lovegrove agreed 30 fps was always the goal because the team wanted to prioritise visual quality. In a Eurogamer interview, Roberts said Studio Liverpool was one of the first developers to use a dynamic framebuffer on the PlayStation 3: an algorithm that reduces resolution when the game engine is stressed, maintaining performance and optimising the frame rate. The technique, known as resolution throttling, was carried over from Wipeout HD to Wipeout 2048: according to Roberts: "If you are dead set on locking frame-rate and resolution your whole game is (graphically) restricted by the worst-case scenario".

== Release and reception ==
Reception

Aggregate score
Aggregator	Score
Metacritic	79/100

Review scores
Publication	Score
The A.V. Club	B
Destructoid	7/10
Eurogamer	7/10
Game Informer	7.75/10
GameRevolution	8/10
GameSpot	7.5/10
GameTrailers	8/10
Giant Bomb	3/5
IGN	7/10
Pocket Gamer	4/5
PlayStation: The Official Magazine	8/10
Push Square	9/10
The Guardian	4/5
VentureBeat	65/100
The Digital Fix	8/10
Digital Spy	4/5

Wipeout 2048 was released as a launch game for the PlayStation Vita in early 2012. It received generally positive reviews, according to the review aggregation website Metacritic, and was Metacritic's 20th-highest-ranked PlayStation Vita game of 2012. In Japan, Famitsu gave it a score of two eights, one seven, and one eight for a total of 31 out of 40.

Critics praised the graphics and visuals, calling them a showcase for the PlayStation Vita's power. Cam Shea of IGN enjoyed the detail and depth but questioned its visual design, saying the dark environments and cluttered worlds make the tracks ambiguous and less readable. Adam Goodall of Gameplanet called the graphics stunning and said it has a pervasive artistic statement, something he considered rare in video games—particularly racing games. According to Digital Spy's Mark Langshaw and GamesRadar+'s Kathryn Bailey, the backdrops are superior to those of Wipeout HD; Langshaw said they showcase the PlayStation Vita's graphical prowess. David Meikleham of PlayStation Official Magazine – UK wrote that the game "brilliantly shows off" the new hardware with its attractive lighting effects, solid frame rate and wide range of colours, and Dan Ryckert of Game Informer said its fast-paced races "do a good job" of displaying the Vita's graphical capabilities. Frédéric Goyon of Jeuxvideo.com liked the use of the PlayStation Vita's OLED screen, although he saw little difference between the graphical enhancements of the game and Wipeout HD. According to Goyon, the game is "fluid in all circumstances" and is essentially Wipeout HD on a smaller screen. Heath Hindman of GameRevolution said although the game "really shows off" the PlayStation Vita's graphical power, the game's sight distance is limited. Its track design was largely praised. Simon Parkin of The Guardian enjoyed its "wholly contemporary" track details and visual consistency with previous instalments, and Peter Willington of Pocket Gamer called the track design the best in the series. According to Sebastian Haley of VentureBeat, the game would have benefited from a "slightly braver" track design.

Willington noted the aliasing and said the game was "undercutting the point" of Wipeout HD, a PlayStation 3 game. An Edge reviewer (who gave it eight out of ten) also called its visuals less exciting than those of the Wipeout series' typical science-fiction setting, noting Studio Liverpool "rewinds the timeline" to a less futuristic, more relatable setting. Martin Gaston of VideoGamer.com said the game has a different but not inferior aesthetic design from the other games due to its "closer to home" near-future setting. According to GameSpot's Mark Walton, the smooth, beautiful visuals created a real feeling of speed and provide breathtaking vistas but is somewhat lacking in innovation. Dale North of Destructoid said games in the series consistently showcase the system on which they were released and that the game was a good launch game for the PlayStation Vita. North called it a beautiful game that is "as fast and flashy as its predecessors", that it "really impresses" on the PlayStation Vita's high-resolution screen and that the ships and futuristic backdrops seem to "pop right off the screen". Haley wrote that the game adheres to the familiar, high visual standard set by previous Wipeout instalments.

Critics enjoyed the use of the PlayStation Vita's analogue control sticks. Goyon praised the optimisation of the Vita's gyroscope and touchpad features, and the effective use of the analogue stick. According to Parkin, the technical impediments made it a learning curve for the developers; he said they did not intend to reduce the manoeuvrability of the PlayStation Vita's analogue stick in contrast to Wipeout HD. Langshaw found the PlayStation Vita's analogue stick to be smooth and responsive, although he questioned its accessibility for players unfamiliar to the series. He enjoyed the use of the gyroscope and touchpad to manoeuvre and collect power-ups, respectively, but said the touchpad does not have the same level of accuracy as its physical alternative. The gameplay was well regarded, including its replay value and balanced difficulty. Ryckert considered the replay value moderate; although its analogue stick does a "good job" of controlling the ships, it has a noticeable lack of traction. According to Hindman, the game would have benefited from a customisable control configuration and the three default setups are unsatisfactory. Willington cited Wipeout 2048 as the best handheld Wipeout, praising its tight controls and variety of content. Edge praised the multiplayer mode, saying it "adds weight and value to the package" and gives a unique slant to the Vita's online potential. Shea and Bailey noted the reduced frame rate of 30 fps, a step down from the franchise's traditional 60 fps. Jeff Gerstmann of Giant Bomb thought the frame rate occasionally affects gameplay and speed but said it was mostly stable. Ian Dransfield of Play UK praised the replay value and multiplayer functions, saying; "It's the sort of game you'll find yourself coming back to again". David Meikleham called Wipeout 2048's balanced difficulty consistently excellent, praising its long campaign as "surprisingly hefty" and not an "on-the-go time-waster".

Although the gameplay was mainly well received, its long loading times were criticised. Gerstmann noted technical problems, particularly its loading times. Shea called the 30-second loading time frustrating "when all you want to do is race" and Goodall described the long loading times as awful but said it is not enough to make the game a failure and that the overall game experience is "deeply satisfying". Bailey said the online mode is well-executed, highly accessible and a "credit to Wipeout". She said its user interface is clean and shiny, and called the touchscreen-based menu system "a pleasure to behold". Parkin criticised the protracted loading times, saying a pause at least twenty seconds too long has a negative effect in the era of "insta-fix mobile gaming on the rival platforms".

Willington found the lengthy load time plagued the game and was "totally at odds" with the normal pace of gameplay. Gaston said the loading time is "simply unforgivable"; he routinely waited over 50 seconds for a selected race to start, which minimised the ability to comfortably play "on the go". Walton also found the long loading times infuriating for a handheld game, and said having to wait more than 40 seconds to start a race is far longer than it should have been. Although Haley noted the substantial loading times, he said it is a common feature in PlayStation Vita launch games.

Robert Workman of GameZone gave it a score of eight out of ten, saying, "While the multiplayer isn't deep, it's satisfying — especially with the PS3 version — and the presentation runs like a futuristic dream should. We'd love to see what kind of turn this series takes next." Lewis Brown of The Digital Fix gave it a similar score of eight out of ten, saying, "What's clear is that WipEout 2048 pushes the Vita to the limit and offers you a console-quality game in the middle of your palms. It looks impressive, it plays impressive, it sounds impressive. Just cross your fingers, hope for some DLC tracks in the future, and everything will be just fine." However, Metro gave it seven out of ten, calling it "A great showcase for the PS Vita and at times as good as WipEout has ever been, despite a few questionable options and graphical issues." Dana Leahy of G4TV also gave it 3.5 out of 5, saying, "With stunning graphics, strong tracks, and a great soundtrack, Wipeout 2048 is a solid launch offering for the PlayStation Vita, even if the load times will make you want to make you throw yourself in front of your own hovercraft."

The game was nominated in the Best Handheld Game category at the 2012 Golden Joystick Awards. It was the second-best-selling PlayStation Vita game in the United Kingdom at the time of its launch, behind Uncharted: Golden Abyss.
