= Wipeout Fusion =

2002 racing video game by Studio Liverpool

- European cover art
- Developer: Studio Liverpool
- Publishers: EU: Sony Computer Entertainment; NA: BAM! Entertainment
- Designer: Colin Berry
- Series: Wipeout
- Engine: Kinetica
- Platform: PlayStation 2
- Release: EU: 8 February 2002; NA: 18 June 2002
- Genre: Racing
- Modes: Single-player, multiplayer

Wipeout Fusion (stylized as WipEout FuSion) is a 2002 racing video game developed by Studio Liverpool and published by Sony Computer Entertainment for the PlayStation 2. The fifth instalment in the Wipeout series, following Wipeout 3 (1999), it was the first as well as the only original Wipeout title for PlayStation 2, with a port of Wipeout Pulse in 2009 being the only other Wipeout released on the platform. The game takes place in 2160 and revolves around players competing in the F9000 anti-gravity racing league. Wipeout Fusion received positive reviews upon release, with particular praise being directed at its techno soundtrack, but its graphics and track design received mixed responses from critics.

== Gameplay ==
Clockwise from top left, the interface displays the player's current position, number of laps, speedometer, shield strength, and lap time.

Wipeout Fusion is a racing game which is set in 2160 and revolves around players competing in the F9000 anti-gravity racing league. Players control anti-gravity ships owned by large racing corporations (collectively referred to as "teams"). Overall, the game contains 45 race tracks, 32 ship models, and 26 weapons. There are eight teams in Wipeout Fusion, each having a lead pilot and second pilot – players can choose which pilot and team they want to use before a race. Each ship has its own characteristics, depending on the team selected, and will vary in terms of speed, acceleration, manoeuvrability, shield strength, weapon power, and mass.

The game has four race modes. Arcade mode involves a standard single race, in which the player must race against opponents and finish first to earn a gold medal; securing second or third place will reward the player with a silver or bronze medal, respectively. The AG League contains ten tournaments; each tournament has 3 to 7 races with sixteen competitors. Money is awarded at the end of each tournament as a result of time, damage, and skill bonuses. Players can use money to upgrade the appearance and performance of their ships. The other two race modes are "Zone" mode, which revolves around survival as the player's ship automatically accelerates to extreme speeds, and time trial mode, where the player may record their best lap times.

In addition, the game features a variety of weapons which can be utilized to destroy other opponents or for self-defence. Offensive weapons include rockets, plasma bolts, missiles, and grenades, whilst defensive weapons range from deployable mines to energy shields. Every ship is also equipped with a standard energy shield which will protect the player from damage caused by collisions or weapon fire. If a shield runs out, the ship will explode and the player in question will be eliminated from the race.

== Development and release ==
The game was developed by Studio Liverpool (formerly known as Psygnosis prior to 2001). After the success of Wipeout 2097, the studio wanted to aim their next game at an "older, savvier crowd". Shortly after the release of Wipeout Fusion, chief designer Colin Berry said in a retrospective interview that he became disillusioned with the way the Wipeout franchise was trying to emulate games such as Nintendo's F-Zero GX. Wipeout Fusion was announced to be published in North America by Bam! Entertainment in March 2002, after a delay in receiving the publishing licence by Sony's American division. The game was ultimately released in Europe on 8 February 2002, and in North America later on 18 June.

== Reception ==
Reception

Aggregate score
Aggregator	Score
Metacritic	83%

Review scores
Publication	Score
Edge	5/10
Eurogamer	7/10
GamePro	9/10
GameSpot	7.3
GameSpy	8.5/10
GameZone	92%
IGN	9/10

Wipeout Fusion received generally favorable reviews upon release. It holds an average score of 83 percent from Metacritic based on aggregate of 21 reviews.

The graphics received mixed opinions from critics. Rick Sanchez of IGN felt disappointed with the game's visuals, opining that its graphics had not changed since he had played it at E3 2001. Sanchez stated that the game looked like an "early first generation PS2 game", and asserted that had it been released a year from writing his review, the graphics would not have looked as dated. Louis Bedigan from GameZone praised the game's attention to detail, stating that the game's visuals had improved by "110%" since Wipeout 3 and thought a lot of time was put into Wipeout Fusion's graphics, resulting in "something truly extraordinary". John Kauderer of GameSpy praised the game's key improvements over its predecessor – in particular its cutting edge graphic design, stating that it "sets [the game] worlds apart from the tired side scrollers and kiddy characters that populated the 16-bit systems". A reviewer from GamePro enjoyed the game's "slickly renovated" graphics. Ryan Davis of GameSpot criticized the game's visuals, asserting that although the track designs appear more "flamboyant" over Wipeout 2097, the game "keeps its visual flash to a minimum". Additionally, Davis also expressed disappointment in the lack of awe-inspiring tracks, as well as the game's occasional slowdown and graphical pop-up issues. In contrast, Tom Bramwell from Eurogamer considered that Wipeout Fusion's only improvement from its predecessors was its improved graphics engine.

Critics praised the game's techno soundtrack and recognized that it was an important part of the Wipeout series. Sanchez opined that the soundtrack from the previous Wipeout games—as well as Wipeout Fusion—are "good enough" to buy separately. Sanchez also commended the game's sound effects and music, stating that both aspects are "dead on for a member of the Wipeout family". Bedigan enjoyed the soundtrack, saying that every song was "addictive" and "suits the game's 'extreme' feel". Kauderer thought that the game had an exceptional soundtrack, stating that since the use of licensed music in Wipeout 2097, the franchise had "changed the face of the industry forever", although he opined that Wipeout Fusion had lost "that cool edge". Davis praised the "hard hitting" techno soundtrack; saying that it was a type of music "you'd want to listen to even when you weren't playing the game". Bramwell, on the other hand, criticized the game's choice of music, stating that the soundtrack feels "like a practical joke" and admitted to muting the music. A reviewer from Edge lauded the soundtrack, describing it as "excellent, trance-inducing", but also said that the gameplay "has failed to keep up with the times".
