= Extreme-G 2 =

1998 video game

- Developer: Probe Entertainment
- Publisher: Acclaim Entertainment
- Platforms: Nintendo 64, Microsoft Windows
- Release: Nintendo 64: NA: 17 November 1998; EU: 4 December 1998; Windows: NA: 22 April 1999; EU: 1999
- Genre: Racing
- Modes: Single-player, multiplayer

Extreme-G 2, also known as Extreme G: XG2, is a racing video game developed by Probe Entertainment and published by Acclaim Entertainment for the Nintendo 64 and Microsoft Windows. It serves as the sequel to Extreme-G and is followed by Extreme-G 3.

== Gameplay ==
A screenshot of Extreme-G 2 gameplay on Nintendo 64 and Microsoft Windows

This installment, like all Extreme-G games, focuses on futuristic racing: pilots compete on plasma-powered Tron-like bikes in an intergalactic Grand Prix, reaching speeds exceeding 999 mph. Each machine features distinct handling characteristics, including varying top speeds, armor values, and traction levels. All machines in the game possess an energy meter that includes two separate energy stores for protective shields and a primary weapon. If a machine depletes all its shield energy, it will explode upon contact, resulting in the player losing a life or the match. Players may also fall off the tracks when navigating jumps or similar obstacles; in such cases, they are simply teleported back to the track. Each player is granted three "Nitro" boosts per race. Extreme-G features a championship mode that ranges from novice to expert, a shoot-'em-up mode (referred to as "Arcade Mode" in XG2), multiplayer racing, and deathmatch. In shoot-'em-up/arcade mode, computer drones follow a lunar path while the player attempts to destroy them using Extreme-G's arsenal of weapons.

== Reception ==
Reception

Aggregate score
Aggregator	Score	
Aggregator	N64	PC
GameRankings	67%	65%

Review scores
Publication	Score	
Publication	N64	PC
AllGame	N/A	2.5/5
CNET Gamecenter	7/10	N/A
Computer Games Strategy Plus	N/A	3/5
Computer Gaming World	N/A	2/5
Electronic Gaming Monthly	6.67/10	N/A
Game Informer	8.25/10	N/A
GamePro	4.5/5	3/5
GameRevolution	B−	N/A
GameSpot	5.5/10	N/A
Hyper	69%	N/A
IGN	6.9/10	N/A
N64 Magazine	85%	N/A
Nintendo Power	7.7/10	N/A
PC Gamer (US)	N/A	76%

The game received "mixed" reviews on both platforms according to the review aggregation website GameRankings. Jes Bickham, an editor for N64 Magazine, noted that while Extreme-G 2 was an improvement over its predecessor, it still fell short compared to other racing titles like F-Zero X and Wipeout 64.

IGN critiqued the gameplay, arguing that the N64 version was "nowhere near its competition," despite enhancements in controls and track design. The graphics faced criticism for their stuttering framerates and excessive filtering effects.

Additionally, the Nintendo 64 version was a finalist for the "Console Racing Game of the Year" at the 2nd Annual Interactive Achievement Awards, ultimately losing to Gran Turismo.

== Trivia ==
In early May 1998, Acclaim organized an international contest to design a bike for the game. The contest was won by Daniel Hoppe, and his design, Wasp, was included in the game.
