= Wipeout 64 =

1998 video game

- North American cover art
- Developer: Psygnosis
- Publisher: Midway Games
- Series: Wipeout
- Platform: Nintendo 64
- Release: NA: 4 November 1998; PAL: 5 February 1999
- Genre: Racing
- Modes: Single-player, multiplayer

Wipeout 64 is a 1998 racing video game developed by Psygnosis and published by Midway Games for the Nintendo 64. It is the third game in the Wipeout series and remains the only one published on a Nintendo console. At the time of the game's release, developer Psygnosis had been owned for five years by Sony Computer Entertainment, for whose hardware all subsequent Wipeout games have been released exclusively.

Set in 2098, a year after Wipeout 2097, Wipeout 64 introduced several new elements to the Wipeout series including analogue control which benefited from the Nintendo 64's controller, new weapons, teams, and tracks. The game received generally positive reviews from critics. Many critics praised the game for its individuality among the Wipeout series, its graphics, offering more tracks and racing craft, unique atmosphere and "superior track design", but opinion is divided whether Wipeout 64 is a 'true sequel' to Wipeout 2097.

== Gameplay ==
Screenshot of Wipeout 64

Most aspects of the gameplay did not differ from the previous two titles. Wipeout is based on a futuristic anti-gravity setting where pilots would race against each other or computer-controlled AI opponents to finish in the highest position possible. Wipeout's gameplay takes inspiration from Formula One parallels; rather than using aerodynamics to increase wheel grip by down-force for faster turning speeds, Wipeout uses a fictionalised method of air braking for ever greater turning force.

Wipeout 64 provides most of the same features as Wipeout 2097 along with new weapons unique to each team. New additions to the weapons interface include the ability to fire three rockets at a time and rear-locking missiles. Returning weapons include the homing missiles, machine guns and electro-bolts. Exclusive to Wipeout 64 is an unlockable weapon power-up called the "Cyclone" which allows the player to strengthen the power of their weapons. There is also the inclusion of an elimination counter that gauges how many opponents were eliminated in a race by the player. This paved the way for the Eliminator mode introduced in Wipeout 3.

Unlike its predecessors that allowed separate screen multiplayer between two players, Wipeout 64 introduces split-screen for a maximum of four players for the first time. Wipeout 64 also introduces a new addition named Challenge Mode where the player has to complete sets of challenges in predefined classes and tracks through either getting the fastest time in a Time Trial, the highest placing in a race, or eliminating the most opponents through a weaponry-based deathmatch.

Most of the tracks in Wipeout 64 feature mirrored layouts of circuits from select tracks in Wipeout and Wipeout XL, set in different locations. Some conversions are not perfectly accurate, as some corners were eased or cut entirely, elevations were changed, and there were no split track sections.

== Development ==
Wipeout 64 was developed by Liverpudlian developer Psygnosis. After rumors that several publishers had approached Psygnosis about developing a Wipeout installment for the Nintendo 64, Psygnosis officially announced Wipeout 64 in April 1998. Development began in February 1998 and it took a total estimated amount of eight months to complete the game. Psygnosis originally intended to publish the game themselves with Sony Music Entertainment handling the distribution for Europe, but in September, Midway obtained publishing and distribution rights. It is a rare N64 title with noticeable load times, disguised by the request 'Please Wait', due to sound decompression times. Wipeout 64 utilized the N64's analogue stick, making ships more responsive than the series' predecessors. Rather than creating a full-fledged sequel to Wipeout 2097, Psygnosis decided to use Wipeout 2097 and tweak its design. Senior producer Andy Satterthwaite stated that Wipeout 64 is a brand-new game and not a port of its predecessor, due to changes to the game structure, new race tracks, and new features. During development, Psygnosis were impressed with the precision of the Nintendo 64 controller's control and were able to make the aircraft curve turns without sacrificing speed. One of the improvements that Psygnosis made from its predecessor is allowing the aircraft to hit the walls of the racetrack without coming to a complete halt.

=== Audio ===
Despite the limited capacity of a game cartridge, Wipeout 64 fit nine music tracks, mostly by composers Rob Lord & Mark Bandola (credited as "PC MUSIC" in-game), with additional tracks by Fluke and Propellerheads. Unlike both of its predecessors, Psygnosis' in-house music team, CoLD SToRAGE, did not produce music for this game, although CoLD SToRAGE's works do make an appearance in future Wipeout games.

Race announcers bridge preceding Wipeouts and Wipeout 3 by having a male voice declare what weapons are about to be used against the player; a female voice welcomes players to the courses and announces in-race events and the result.

== Reception ==
Reception

Aggregate scores
Aggregator	Score
GameRankings	87%
Metacritic	84/100

Review scores
Publication	Score
Computer and Video Games	4/5
GamePro	4.5/5
GameSpot	6.9/10
IGN	9.1/10
Next Generation	4/5
Nintendo Power	8.3/10
Gamers' Republic	C+

Wipeout 64 received generally positive reviews from critics. The game received an aggregate score of 84/100 from Metacritic. Reviewers were generally impressed with the innovation and complexity the game offered; mostly stating that Wipeout 64 had "everything a futuristic racer needs, a large variety of tracks, well-designed craft, weapons, numerous game modes and speed".

The graphics were well-received from critics. IGN remarked that Wipeout 64 was a superior game to F-Zero X. IGN praised the game on its graphics, saying in the verdict that the visuals "are absolutely beautiful" and that the in-game soundtrack and sound-effects were "top-notch", and that it included clean boost audio and excellent "scrape" noises. Despite the considerable praise, a mixed review came from Joe Fielder of GameSpot, saying that regarding the graphics, the visuals in Wipeout 64 did not meet the par set by Wipeout 2097 that was released for the PlayStation two years prior. Fielder noted, however, that the new multiplayer mode was the game's main advancement over the previous titles. Next Generation praised the game, stating that "Wipeout provides a much sought-after experience and does it brilliantly".

Most reviews compared the game with F-Zero X which was released a month earlier, with the general assumption that Nintendo's own futuristic racer offered more tracks and racing craft, but Wipeout 64 contained superior track designs and atmosphere. GameSpot criticized the game, saying that "WipeOut 64 isn't horrible, it just feels like the developer's first effort for the system at times – which it is". "Sayewonn" of Gaming Age praised its new innovations, especially its analogue control, saying that "adapting analogue controls was the biggest improvement racing games made and Wipeout 64 demonstrates that beautifully". Sayewonn also noted that the game still had a "learning curve", noting that "it's not as brutal as the first game but definitely harder than the far easier XL". Despite being complimentary of Wipeout 64, both GameSpot and Gaming Age recommended purchasing F-Zero X instead. Gamepro gave a positive review of the series, praising its music, controls, and variety of the game. Gamepro, in addition, compared the game to Extreme-G2 and F-Zero X: "While Extreme G-2 may match Wipeout in content, it simply can't compete when trying to match W64's speed and F-Zero X isn't even in the same league".

Opinion is divided on whether Wipeout 64 simply merges the good points of the previous two games, or is different enough to be considered a sequel in its own right. Praised elements include "prettier" and "grittier" graphics compared to F-Zero X. Pop-up and a slow frame rate are repeatedly mentioned as problems, but only when the screen is split up to three or four times in multiplayer mode.
