= Fired Up (video game) =

2005 video game

- Developer(s): London Studio
- Publisher(s): Sony Computer Entertainment
- Designer(s): Ben Cousins
- Platform(s): PlayStation Portable
- Release: PAL: 1 September 2005
- Genre(s): Vehicular combat
- Mode(s): Single-player, multiplayer

Fired Up is a vehicular combat video game developed by London Studio and published by Sony Computer Entertainment for the PlayStation Portable. It was only released in PAL territories. The game features a single-player campaign and a multiplayer mode which supports up to eight players. The game features demos of Wipeout Pure and MediEvil: Resurrection.

== Gameplay ==
Fired Up's Campaign mode is set in an unnamed small country that has been invaded by a neighbouring country only known as "The Republic". The player takes on the role of five different characters fighting as mercenaries for a resistance army in a select variety of vehicles across four different locations.

The player can take on a series of missions whenever they please, otherwise they can find yellow scavenge tokens which, for each 10 tokens collected, will unlock new secondary weapons for use against AI enemies that continuously spawn throughout the map. These weapons include grenades, heavy missiles, and laser. There are also turrets around the map for the player to use.

Also available are challenges, taking on the form of large trucks that roam the city. Upon destruction of one, the player must seek and eliminate the required number of enemies before the allocated time elapses. For every level of challenge complete, more and better health and armor pickups will spawn for the player to collect.

=== Multiplayer ===
Fired Up features a multiplayer mode which supports up to eight players, through ad-hoc. The host can choose a variety of maps (some available as downloadable content), and game modes. Prior to the game starting, players can choose their preferred vehicle; the selection of vehicles includes some of those that are not normally playable in the Campaign mode.

==== Modes ====
- Deathmatch - Straight up vehicular brawl. Weapons vary on the map for which the players can use against their opponents. Also includes Team Deathmatch.
- Team Capture the Flag - Players must grab the enemies' flag and return it to their base to score a point. Be wary as the enemy will do the same.
- King of the Hill - A point is to be contested by all players. The winner is the one who has stayed in the hill the longest. Also includes Team King of the Hill.
- Team Bomb the Base - Players must pick up explosives, spawning randomly across the map, and deliver them to the enemy's base. Ownership of bombs are carried over to players who kill enemy bomb carriers.
- Assimilation - All players begin 'infected' but can find and pickup 'Antidote' pickups to cure them. The infected must then re-infect those by finding and either contact or kill. The last remaining player to be infected wins.
- Race - The map is modified into a circuit and the first player to cross the finish line, is the winner. Along the way are items for the player to use, but they may either help or hinder the player in some way.
