= Wipeout 3 =

1999 video game

- PAL region box art
- Developer: Psygnosis Leeds
- Publishers: EU: Sony Computer Entertainment; NA: Psygnosis
- Artist: The Designers Republic
- Series: Wipeout
- Platform: PlayStation
- Release: EU: 10 September 1999; NA: 24 September 1999; Special Edition: EU: 14 July 2000
- Genre: Racing
- Modes: Single-player, multiplayer

Wipeout 3 (Note: The game title is stylised as ẉip3o̤ut in Europe and Japan, and as ẉipEo̤ut 3 in North America.) is a 1999 racing video game developed by Psygnosis and published by Sony Computer Entertainment for the PlayStation. It is the fourth game and third main instalment in the Wipeout series, following Wipeout 64 (1998), and the third on PlayStation following Wipeout 2097 (1996). It is the first game in the series to be released on neither a Sega or Nintendo console nor personal computers. Players control anti-gravity ships and use weapons to force other contenders out of the race.

Psygnosis hired design studio The Designers Republic to create a simple color scheme and design for in-game menus and race courses, to create what a Psygnosis staff member called "a believable future". The game is one of the few PlayStation titles to run in 16:9 widescreen and high-resolution mode, offering crisper graphics and visuals. Wipeout 3's soundtrack is composed of electronica tracks selected by DJ Sasha and features contributions by Orbital and The Chemical Brothers. The game was re-released in Europe as Wipeout 3: Special Edition in August 2000, which contained additional tracks and content.

The game was positively received on release: critics lauded the graphics, music, and minimalist design elements. The high level of difficulty and lack of new content, courses, or game features were seen as the game's primary faults. Wipeout 3 was the last title in the series to appear on the first generation PlayStation; the next entry, Wipeout Fusion, was released exclusively for the PlayStation 2 platform in 2002.

== Gameplay ==
Screenshot of Wipeout 3, showing the player's head-up display and racing craft

Wipeout 3 is a racing game that retains the same basic elements of its predecessors. The game is set in the future, where players control futuristic anti-gravity ships owned by eight different racing corporations and pilot them on eight circuits. Each craft is equipped with an energy shield that absorbs damage sustained on the track; if the shield is disabled, the player's craft can be knocked out of the race. Shields are regenerated in a pit lane set apart from the main course. The less time is spent in the pit lane, the less the shield will regenerate. In addition to shields, each racing craft contains airbrakes for navigating tight corners, as well as a "Hyperthrust" option. Players can activate Hyperthrust to increase their speed, but using Hyperthrust drains energy from the shields, making the craft more vulnerable. Scattered across each raceway are weapon grids that bestow random power-ups or items. Wipeout 3 adds new weapons in addition to the five retained from previous games. Players can use rockets, missiles, or mines to disable enemies, or shield themselves from harm with defensive items.

Wipeout 3 features six game modes. The single race mode awards medals to the top three finishers. Each contestant must reach checkpoints on the course within a certain amount of time, or be ejected from the race. Winning consecutive gold medals unlocks new tracks and crafts. Other game modes include time trials and challenge modes; an "Eliminator" deathmatch-type mode, players gain points for destroying competitors and finishing laps; and a "Tournament" mode where players are awarded points for standing across multiple races. Players can engage in two-player racing via a split-screen option.

== Development ==
Developer Psygnosis began developing the next entry in the Wipeout series in 1999, three years after the release of Wipeout 2097. In the interim, Psygnosis had been acquired by Sony and released Wipeout 64, a Nintendo 64 exclusive title that proved the franchise remained popular. Sony gave the team a small budget and tight schedule—only nine months—to ship the game before the new PlayStation 2 arrived. Because of the time constraints, lead designer Wayne Imlach recalled that the team was conservative about adding new features or changing too much of the formula, instead focusing on refining what had been established in 2097. Psygnosis retained many of the developers of the original game to preserve the distinctive racing experience of the earlier games. At the same time, Psygnosis sought to make the game more accessible to new players of the fast-paced racer, and kept early courses easier for these players; the difficulty was adjusted for later courses so that experts would still experience a challenge. An initial pool of 20 tracks was whittled down to 8 after playtesting; the developers wanted a variety of tracks that favored different ships and had different difficulty levels. Wipeout 3 was the first Wipeout game to take advantage of PlayStation controllers with analogue sticks, used to offer smoother control of the player's craft.

An advantage of developing for the mature PlayStation platform was that the developers knew how to push the console to its limits. Psygnosis prioritized using the console's high-definition widescreen mode, which many development teams had found infeasible. Renderer optimizations allowed the team to boost the resolution from 256x240 to 512x256 pixels, and engineers rewrote the console renderer to reduce clipping and seaming issues that plagued many of the console's games. The game was targeted at the PAL video format and a 25 frames per second frame rate, then converted for NTSC at 30 frames a second; as a result, the game clock and thus the entire game experience was faster on NTSC consoles. Another technical hurdle was adding local split-screen play, which required more computation despite the same output resolution. Psygnosis had distant ships render at much lower levels of detail to reduce the technical demand on the system.

Psygnosis turned to the graphic design studio The Designers Republic to assist in development. The Designers Republic, known for its underground techno album covers, provided "visual candy" to Wipeout 3's graphics, designing the game's icons, billboards, colour schemes, and custom typefaces. The look and feel of the futuristic courses was bounded by the desire to remain believable: Wipeout 3 lead artist Nicky Westcott said that "[Psygnosis] tried to make it look like a believable future, instead of making the sky toxic orange with 10 moons flying around and the world gone mad." The artists also set Wipeout 3 apart from its predecessors by using a different color palette, which Imlach felt made the game's style feel more refined and mature.

Music is an important part of the Wipeout series. Continuing the tradition set by the first game, Wipeout 3 contains licensed tracks from various electronica artists, including The Chemical Brothers, Orbital, and the Propellerheads. Psygnosis' development manager, Enda Carey, focused on bringing together music early in the game's development cycle, instead of as an afterthought or last-minute addition to the game. Unlike previous soundtracks, Psygnosis selected a single music director, Sasha, a Welsh deejay. Sasha noted that his work on the games brought his music to an audience of millions, rather than the tens of thousands he would sell copies to in England, and that his video game appearances were a bigger deal to some of his friends and family than his musical accomplishments. Sasha contributed several of his own tracks made specifically for the game, as well as selecting other artists to create a cohesive soundtrack. To promote Wipeout 3 and its game music, Psygnosis sponsored a Global Underground tour for Sasha. Game pods featuring Wipeout 3 were placed at parties and venues, accompanied by a tie-in marketing campaign. The game disc is a Mixed Mode CD that allows Wipeout 3's soundtrack to be played in a standard compact disc player.

Psygnosis announced the game at the Tokyo Game Show in 1999 alongside Wipeout 64 for the Nintendo 64 console. The developers previewed the game at the Electronic Entertainment Expo in May, where IGN rated it the best racing game at the show.

== Release ==
Wipeout 3 was released in Europe and North America in September 1999. A special edition of Wipeout 3 was released exclusively in Europe on 14 July 2000. Wipeout 3 Special Edition featured many minor changes to gameplay, such as different craft physics, auto-loading of saves and AI bug fixes. In addition, eight courses from previous Wipeout titles (three from Wipeout and five from Wipeout 2097), plus two hidden prototype circuits previously only available in the Japanese version of Wipeout 3. The Special Edition also allowed for four-person multiplayer, using two televisions and two PlayStation consoles. Wipeout 3 was the last game in the series made for PlayStation. The next entry in the Wipeout series, entitled Wipeout Fusion, was released in 2002 exclusively for PlayStation 2. The game introduced new courses, crafts, and weaponry, as well as enhanced artificial intelligence.

== Reception ==
Reception

Aggregate score
Aggregator	Score
Metacritic	89/100

Review scores
Publication	Score
CNET Gamecenter	9/10
Edge	7/10
Electronic Gaming Monthly	7.375/10 (Note: Two critics of Electronic Gaming Monthly gave the game each a score of 8/10, one gave it 6/10, and the other gave it 7.5/10.)
Game Informer	7.75/10
GameFan	(T.R.) 98% 82%
GameRevolution	B+
GameSpot	8.3/10
IGN	9.1/10
Next Generation	3/5
Official U.S. PlayStation Magazine	4/5

Critical reception of Wipeout 3 was generally positive; the game has a critic average of 87/100 Game Rankings, and a metascore of 89 at Metacritic. GamePro said that the game was "hands-down the best futuristic racing game to ever come on the PlayStation. Its blazing frame rate, smooth graphics, and kick-ass soundtrack make it the must-have game for anyone who has a passion for fast, furious fun." Critics noted that if players liked or disliked previous games, Wipeout 3 would not change their mind. Favorable reviews often called it the best game in the series, refining what made the first two games memorable.

Reviewers who gave Wipeout 3 lower marks noted a sense of disappointment that the series broke little new ground. Stuart Miles of The Times considered Wipeout 3 a good game, but felt that he had been expecting much more from the sequel; "It's as if the programmers have concerned themselves more with the overall look and feel, rather than further developing the existing gameplay," he wrote. Alistair Wallace of Gamasutra, in a retrospective on Wipeout 2097, remembered that "I enjoyed [Wipeout 3] because it was more of the same and I loved it, but I think the series ran out of its innovation. Doing loop the loops isn't a big deal really". Joe Fielder of GameSpot summed up its review of the game by judging the game an excellent racer, but not able to beat Wipeout 2097 as the best futuristic racing game of all time.

The fast-paced gameplay and graphics were singled out as strong features of the game. Jack Schofield of The Guardian was surprised by the level of detail, stating that the "graphics are better than you'd expect the [PlayStation] to deliver". Both Scary Larry of GamePro and Baldric of GameRevolution praised the new features, specifically the new weapons and ability to challenge friends via splitscreen. The difficulty progression was described as steep, with David Canter of The San Diego Union-Tribune writing tournament game mode went from "easy as pie to tough as nails". Though the analogue stick was judged as helping to increase control over the onscreen craft, GamePro and The Sydney Morning Herald's reviewers found that proper handling required large amounts of patience and practice. Jeff Lundrigan of NextGen said of the game, "It's not terrible, but for a series known for its 'gee whiz' level of quality, this is a serious misstep."

The game's visual design was praised, with The New York Times calling the game "deep-dish slice of graphic design and club culture, a sly piece of eye candy for the fashion-conscious gamer." While Official U.S. PlayStation Magazine' Mark MacDonald praised the overall graphics, they felt the weapons and other special effects were too subtle. Game Revolution praised The Designer Republic's style as helping to make the racing locales seem real, though David Goldfarb of the magazine International Design stated that the "techno-meets-Nihonpop-art visuals" had been executed better in previous entries of the series. The Los Angeles Times felt that similar games "[dripping] with attitude" turned out not to be fun to play, but that Wipeout successfully avoided being off-putting. Wipeout 3's soundtrack and sound effects were also lauded.

IGN named it the most accessible game of the series, and in 2007 the title was named the 92nd best game by the site. In 2021, Retro Gamer noted Special Edition as one of the best PS1 racing games. Despite generally positive reviews of the game, Wipeout 3 was not a commercial success. Programmer David Jefferies felt the game's poor performance was partly due to the franchise being European-centric, as well as releasing Wipeout as attention shifted to the next generation of game consoles. Despite disappointing sales, the franchise continued with Wipeout Fusion on the PlayStation 2.
