= XGRA: Extreme-G Racing Association =

2003 video game

- German PAL cover art
- Developer: Acclaim Studios Cheltenham
- Publisher: Acclaim Entertainment
- Designer: Christopher Whiteside
- Platforms: PlayStation 2; Xbox; GameCube
- Release: September 10, 2003: PlayStation 2, Xbox; NA: September 10, 2003 (PS2); NA: September 16, 2003 (Xbox); AU: October 1, 2003; EU: October 3, 2003 GameCube; NA: November 24, 2003; PAL: March 5, 2004
- Genre: Racing
- Modes: Single-player, multiplayer

XGRA: Extreme-G Racing Association is a futuristic racing video game and the fourth and final installment in the Extreme-G series, succeeding Extreme-G 3. This game features an expanded selection of tracks, as well as a brand-new weapon system.

== Overview ==
Screenshot of gameplay

The gameplay is similar to previous titles in the series but includes notable differences. XGRA boasts a diverse array of riders, tracks, and bikes that can accelerate at astonishing speeds, reaching 0 to 300 mph (0 to 483 km/h) in mere seconds. A returning feature is the ability to break the sound barrier: upon reaching 750 mph, all sound effects will cease, except for item collection sounds, other riders' taunts, weapons firing, and in-game music.

In XGRA, players can race for 8 different teams, each with bikes that possess unique advantages and drawbacks, such as Regeneration, Handling, Speed, Acceleration, and Shielding.

== Reception ==
Reception

Aggregate score
Aggregator	Score		
Aggregator	GameCube	PS2	Xbox
Metacritic	69/100	68/100	66/100

Review scores
Publication	Score		
Publication	GameCube	PS2	Xbox
Edge	N/A	5/10	N/A
Electronic Gaming Monthly	6.83/10	6.83/10	6.83/10
Eurogamer	N/A	5/10	N/A
Game Informer	N/A	5/10	5/10
GamePro	N/A	N/A	3.5/5
GameSpot	7.2/10	7.2/10	7.4/10
GameSpy	N/A	3/5	3/5
GameZone	7.1/10	7.6/10	N/A
IGN	7.5/10	7.5/10	7.5/10
Nintendo Power	3.2/5	N/A	N/A
Official U.S. PlayStation Magazine	N/A	4.5/5	N/A
Official Xbox Magazine (US)	N/A	N/A	7.8/10

XGRA: Extreme-G Racing Association received "average" reviews on all platforms according to the review aggregation website Metacritic.
