= Psalter Lane =

Former campus of Sheffield Hallam University

Psalter Lane was the location of a former campus of Sheffield Hallam University in Sheffield, England. One of the former polytechnic's three bases, the campus officially closed on 31 August 2008 and work to demolish all but the old Bluecoat School building began in March 2010. Demolition work was scheduled to be completed by September 2010. It was situated further out of central Sheffield than the City campus on Pond Street and the Collegiate Crescent campus. Psalter Lane was mainly concerned with ACES (Faculties of Arts, Computing, Engineering and Sciences) courses, although a number of courses within the Faculty of Development and Society were also taught on site, such as film studies.

== Facilities ==
The library at Psalter Lane specialised in the arts and media. The Special Collections included an original of Stubbs' The Anatomy of the Horse (1766) and a collection of photographs from the miners strike. All Special Collections have moved to the main City Campus site.

== Notable events in Psalter Lane history ==
- 1911: Brincliffe Quarry closed, filled in and the present building was opened as the Bluecoat School for Boys.
- 1939: the school building requisitioned by the British Army and the Bluecoat School ceased to exist as a separate entity; the boys were dispersed to other schools in the City.
- 1945: Sheffield College of Arts and Crafts, originally in Arundel St. Sheffield but destroyed during the Second World War, moved into the Psalter Lane premises.
- 1978: the site (then known as Sheffield Art College) hosted the first gig by The Human League. ABC also performed live for the first time at Psalter Lane.
- 2008: graffiti artist and Hallam graduate, Kid Acne created an art work "You'll Miss Me When I'm Gone" over the entrance to the campus.
- 2010 Work to demolish Sheffield Hallam University's campus began in March, with arrangements to protect the former Blue Coat School of 1911, and preserve trees on the site.

== Notable students ==
- Oreet Ashery, performance artist
- John Hoyland RA
- David Mellor, Designer
- Nick Park, creator of Wallace and Gromit
- Nick Phillips, graphic designer
- Tom Ravenscroft, DJ
- Mr. Scruff, DJ
- David Sheppard, musician, Brian Eno biographer
