= Matrix Marauders =

1990 video game

- Developer: Psygnosis
- Publisher: Psyclapse
- Platforms: Amiga, Atari ST
- Release: 1990
- Genre: Racing

Matrix Marauders is a 1990 racing video game published by Psyclapse.

== Gameplay ==
The racing game is set in the future, where the player takes part in a racing challenge, in which they race cars in a speed test to see who can reach the finish-line first. The cars have power ups which can be deployed or fired during the game to aid competitors. There are holes on the tracks which must be jumped over. The screen has an interface that allows the player to lock on to opponents and offers warnings when competitors are encroaching, as well as a navigator that speaks to the player.

== Development ==
The loading sequences of the game were designed by Jim Bowers, who also designed those of Psygnosis games Obliterator and Infestation. Bowers shaded and blended images from the game to give them a metallic look. The game was released after June 1990.

== Reception ==
Kultpower gave the Atari ST version a 32%, and the Amiga version a 32% as well. Meanwhile, German magazine Datormagazin gave it a 7/10 while CU Amiga gave it 25%.
