= Wipeout Pure =

2005 video game

- European cover art
- Developer: Studio Liverpool
- Publisher: Sony Computer Entertainment
- Producers: Phil Quirke-Webster, Tony Buckley
- Designer: Colin Berry
- Programmer: Dave Burrows
- Series: Wipeout
- Platform: PlayStation Portable
- Release: NA: 24 March 2005; JP: 7 April 2005; EU: 1 September 2005
- Genre: Racing
- Modes: Single-player, multiplayer

Wipeout Pure (stylised as wipE′out pṳrE) is a 2005 racing video game developed by Studio Liverpool and published by Sony Computer Entertainment for the PlayStation Portable. It was released as a launch title for the platform in North America and PAL territories, in March and September respectively. The sixth installment of the Wipeout series, following Wipeout Fusion (2002), the game takes place in the year 2197, exactly 100 years after the events of Wipeout 2097 (1996), and revolves around players competing in the FX300 anti-gravity racing league.

Developed by Studio Liverpool, production of Wipeout Pure started in August 2003 and lasted until early 2005. Throughout development, the team created entirely new user interfaces and other algorithms which sped up the development process in time for the PlayStation Portable's North American launch. The game received positive reviews from critics upon release. Reviewers unanimously praised the graphics, track designs and general aesthetics, but some noticed occasional frame rate fluctuations.

== Gameplay ==
From left to right clockwise, the interface displays lap time, current weapon, speedometer, shield strength and number of laps.

Wipeout Pure is a racing game which is set in the year 2197, exactly 100 years after the events of Wipeout 2097, and revolves around players competing in the FX300 anti-gravity racing league. Players control anti-gravity ships which are owned by racing corporations (effectively referred to as 'teams' in-game). There are a total of eight teams featured in the game, with one ship available for each. Every ship has different characteristics, for example each ship has variations in handling, thrust, maximum speed and shield strength. Each craft is equipped with an energy shield which absorbs damage sustained during a race; energy is lost whenever the player's ship collides or is hit by weapon fire. If the shield runs out, the player's ship will explode and is consequently eliminated from the race. However, the player may replenish energy by absorbing weapon pick-ups.

In addition to shielding, each ship has air brakes which can be utilised for navigating through difficult corners at high speed. The game also features several weapons which can be used against opponents, although some weapons have defensive purposes. For example, an autopilot will give control of the player's ship over to the computer for a short period of time, and shields can be used to protect the player's ship from all damage, albeit temporarily. Offensive weapons include rockets, missiles, plasma bolts and mines. Game modes include a single race, tournament, time trial and an exclusive "Zone" mode, which revolves around survival as the player's ship increasingly accelerates to extreme speeds. The game also features an online multiplayer mode in addition to downloadable content, which features new ships, tracks and music.

=== Downloadable content ===
Wipeout Pure was the first PSP title to support downloadable content including extra vehicles, tracks, and artwork free of charge via the Internet. Packs of downloadable content were made available every month for six months. There were three main packs, in one form or another, in all regions where DLC support was made available: Gamma, Delta, and Classic. In addition, there were also a number of region-exclusive packs that was only available for a specific version. DLC packs are not cross-compatible. They were released on the Wipeout Pure official site, which was eventually shut down, but have since been preserved through third-party websites.

=== Region differences ===
To compensate for the delay of the launch in Europe, both for the PSP and its games, Studio Liverpool added a few new features to the European version. Wipeout Pure supports game sharing which allowed owners of the European version the ability to send the demo version over Wi-Fi to other PSP owners who do not own Pure. This gives said players the ability to have up to 8-player games with only one copy of the game (but limited to the demo tracks). Another feature added was the playable demo for Fired Up and a MediEvil: Resurrection movie demo. The Fired Up demo also supported game sharing for multiplayer with up to 7 friends who didn't own a copy of Pure or Fired Up, but only on the "Junkyard" and "Arctic" levels. Finally, the European release contains four exclusive tracks then-available via download. These are named the Omega League. Aside from the American, European, and Japanese versions, there are two more versions: a Korean version with downloadable content support but no available downloads, and an Asian version which includes no download feature. Also, there was a demo for the game, which came bundled with the UMD release of the 2005 film, Stealth.

== Development ==
Wipeout Pure was developed by Liverpudlian developer Studio Liverpool. Pre-production of the game began in August 2003 and full production occurred in October of that year, with only two staff members working on the game at that time. The team received development kits for the PlayStation Portable in August 2004; by this time the development team had grown to twenty people. Dave Burrows, one of the original two staff members who conceptualised the game, reflected in a retrospective "post-mortem" that the studio had to learn from their previous mistakes with their predecessor, Wipeout Fusion. Burrows cited that one of the principal difficulties the development team faced was that the team's artists and designers were "fighting almost all of the time"; designers would first design a track for the game, then pass it over to the artists whilst the former were still making adjustments to it. Burrows also recalled that the developer's editing kits required many hours worth of "tweaking", which ultimately did not result in a smooth workflow.

We needed the dynamics, user interface, A.I. and core elements first so we can get in and test. Not in a finished state, but in a state that is at least basically playable.

— Dave Burrows explaining the studio's development process in a retrospective "post-mortem".

During development, the team set out to make the game playable for testing as soon as possible. Burrows explained that Studio Liverpool were forced to create a user interface "entirely from scratch", along with dynamics, artificial intelligence and core elements before testing could commence. Development of each of these aspects were split into six-week cycles; Burrows stated that instead of the team spending six weeks designing and perfecting all the weapons in-game, the team spent three days designing weapons individually rather than simultaneously. Burrows recalled that whilst developing Wipeout Fusion, Studio Liverpool found that half of their time was being "soaked up" by building a user interface for their editor. As the team knew that Wipeout Pure would have to be shipped out in time for the PlayStation Portable's release, the decision was made to create new plugins for their software, Autodesk Maya, in order to save time during development.

After creating custom plugins for the 3D computer graphics software, Burrows claimed that the team could create and test entire race tracks within five minutes. The custom plugin used for creating tracks consisted of a 450 kilobyte file, which contained polygon subdividing and data on artificial intelligence, effectively cutting down the time to create tracks from six hours to five minutes. In order to the play the game as soon as possible, the team developed the user interface in the XML markup language, which allowed revisions to be made for the content at any time. However, Burrows recalled that the only downside to converting everything to XML was that the game was always in danger of becoming too large for the PlayStation Portable's Universal Media Disc. The game's cover art was designed by Popgun, who also designed the logos for games released by EA Sports.

In order to showcase the PlayStation Portable's capabilities, the team had to develop a download system that could provide the game with future downloadable content, which included new tracks, music and ships. In addition, Burrows realised that new downloadable content had the potential to bring in more revenue for Studio Liverpool. In order to achieve this, the team had to find a way to bypass the problems involved in getting the PlayStation Portable to recognise download files. The solution required the use of piggybacking game data to a valid format recognised by the PlayStation Portable; in which a dummy file would be used on a web-based Java application.

== Reception ==
Reception

Aggregate score
Aggregator	Score
Metacritic	88%

Review scores
Publication	Score
1Up.com	9/10
Edge	8/10
GamePro	4.5/5
GameSpot	8.8/10
GameSpy	5/5
GamesRadar+	4/5
IGN	9.3/10

Wipeout Pure received positive reviews upon release. It holds an aggregate score of 88% from Metacritic based on 53 reviews.

The graphics were the most praised aspect of the game. Ryan Davis of GameSpot said that the visuals were "gorgeous" and breathtaking to look at, both in ship designs and details of the tracks. Davis noted that the game never remains at a "solid" 60 frames per second, which can cause occasional fluctuation. A reviewer of GamePro similarly praised the visuals as breathtaking, stating that the "beautiful" panoramic scenery defied the notion of usual graphics displayed on a handheld console. Ryan O'Donnell of IGN considered the graphics to be the strongest aspect of the game, saying that its courses, weapon detail and ship designs were "beautiful", but he found that occasional framerate issues kept it from "perfection". Daniel Chang of GameSpy opined that the visuals were "well-crafted as any video game or feature film". John Davison of 1UP stated that both the game's presentation and graphics were stunning and "absolutely beautiful". A reviewer from Edge similarly praised the aesthetics as "beautiful" and dynamic. Andy Kelly of GamesRadar stated that the visuals were well-designed, although he noticed some frame rate drops.

Critics also viewed various aspects of the gameplay favourably. Davis said that the high-speed gameplay was "incredibly engaging" and artistic on both a visual and technical level. A reviewer of GamePro enjoyed the idea of using different ships in races and also praised the game's online multiplayer, stating that it "adds a whole new dynamic to the game". O'Donnell cited the developer's intention of blending ultra-fast gameplay as "clever". In addition, O'Donnell acknowledged that Studio Liverpool "learned from their mistakes" from the poor gameplay of its predecessor, Wipeout Fusion, and created what O'Donnell considered as "the most polished futuristic racer to ever hit the market". Chang similarly opined that the previous installment was "obtuse" and did not present a positive experience to the Wipeout franchise, although he agreed that Wipeout Pure resulted in becoming an "extremely polished" and playable futuristic racing game, further adding that the developers trimmed off elements that were considered ineffective in previous games. A reviewer of Edge praised the game's different modes as dynamic and vicious, stating that the game delivers an "absolute" sense of control. Kelly considered the online multiplayer "superbly executed" and the large amount of weapons in the game well-designed.

During the 9th Annual Interactive Achievement Awards, Wipeout Pure received a nomination for "Outstanding Achievement in Soundtrack".
