= Wipeout Pulse =

2007 video game

- European cover art
- Developers: Studio Liverpool; Spiral House (PS2)
- Publisher: Sony Computer Entertainment
- Designer: Studio Liverpool
- Series: Wipeout
- Platforms: PlayStation Portable, PlayStation 2
- Release: PlayStation Portable: AU: 13 December 2007; EU: 14 December 2007; NA: 12 February 2008; PlayStation 2: EU: 24 June 2009
- Genre: Racing
- Modes: Single-player, multiplayer

Wipeout Pulse (stylised as wipEout pulse) is a 2007 racing video game developed by Studio Liverpool and published by Sony Computer Entertainment for the PlayStation Portable. A PlayStation 2 port developed by Spiral House was released only in Europe in June 2009. The game is the seventh installment of the Wipeout series and serves as a sequel to Wipeout Pure (2005). It takes place in 2207 and revolves around players competing in the FX400 anti-gravity racing league.

The game was developed by Studio Liverpool. Production was centered around focusing on the feedback left by fans regarding Wipeout Pure, and improving on aspects where the development team thought they had failed in with the predecessor. The game features sixteen licensed music tracks from electronica artists, including Kraftwerk. Wipeout Pulse received positive reviews upon release. Critics praised the graphics and presentation, although some criticized the repetitiveness and high difficulty.

== Gameplay ==
From left to right clockwise, the interface displays the number of laps, the teams of competing players, speedometer, shield strength, current playing song, and lap time.

Wipeout Pulse is a racing game set in 2207, ten years after the events of Wipeout Pure. As with its predecessor, the game revolves around players competing in the FX400 anti-gravity racing league. Players pilot anti-gravity ships owned by racing corporations (collectively referred to as "teams" in-game). There are eight teams in Wipeout Pulse, with one ship available for each – although the player eventually gains the ability to change the appearance of their ships. Each ship has different characteristics; depending on the team chosen, its ship will vary in terms of handling, speed, acceleration and shield strength.

Every ship is equipped with an energy shield which will protect the player from damage sustained from weapon fire or colliding with walls, although energy is taken away if this happens. If the shield completely runs out, the ship will explode and the player will be eliminated from the race. In addition, the player's ship is equipped with air brakes which can be used for manoeuvring through difficult corners at high speed. The game features a number of weapons which can be utilized to destroy other opponents or for self-defense. Defensive weapons range from shields—which make the player's ship invulnerable to damage for a short period—to land mines and stationary bombs. Offensive weaponry vary from machine guns, missiles, plasma bolts, and a "quake" – which comes in the form of a devastating earthquake that will damage all opponents.

The campaign mode features sixteen grids divided into cells, each containing a separate event which varies from ordinary races to tournaments. Once the player finishes the event in a single cell, they will earn "completion points" needed to progress to the next grid. Clearing a cell will unlock additional cells adjoining it. Returning game modes from Wipeout Pure include single races, tournaments, time trials, and the "Zone" mode, which involves the player's ship automatically accelerating to extreme speeds. A returning game mode from Wipeout 3 is "Eliminator", which revolves around a group of competitors attempting to destroy each other the quickest in a set amount of time.

While the game only ships with twelve tracks, these can be driven both forward and backwards; the race's direction is marked by the suffix "White" or "Black" on the race's title (i.e. "Talon's Junction White"). The "Black" variations often take alternate routes, and feature different weapon and boost pad locations.

The game features a number of extras. Players can take screenshots of in-progress races at any time from the Pause menu in the PSP version. Players are rewarded for using the same team's ship over and over via a "Loyalty" system which unlocks new ship skins. Players were able to create custom skins for any ships at the game's central website using an Adobe Shockwave-based client, which could be downloaded to the PSP by the creator and/or the public at large. Lap times and other records could also be uploaded to the game's website which features a global ranking leaderboard. Both features are no longer available as the site and the game servers were shut down.

A demo of the game was also released on the PlayStation Store on 13 December 2007, which included one track (Moa Therma) and one team (Feisar), as well as Ad-Hoc support for playing with users who purchased the full game (or owned the UMD).

== Expansion packs ==
Wipeout Pulse, like its predecessor Wipeout Pure, also has downloadable content packs that include new ships and tracks as well as new campaign grids. A total of four packs were released, each including a new ship, two track variants (i.e. a "White" variant for a track and a "Black" variant for another track, and in order to get all variants one has to obtain all four packs) and a new campaign grid named after the downloaded pack. These packs were available to download for the PlayStation Portable version for a price from the PlayStation Store in the European region only. All downloadable packs are already included with the PS2 port.

== Development ==
Wipeout Pulse was developed by Studio Liverpool. Colin Berry, the lead designer of the game, stated in an interview that the team had received a lot of positive feedback from Wipeout Pure, and was willing to use parts of the feedback to "help shape some elements of Pulse". According to Berry, some people had felt that the previous game was too difficult; the ships were considered too fast and the artificial intelligence (AI) too advanced, whereas others thought that the game was too easy and they wanted "something more challenging to keep them coming back". The development team also took steps to decrease the feeling of repetition, which was often cited as one of the main complaints of Wipeout Pure. In addition, the team altered the game's difficulty settings so that players were given the choice to change the speed of the game at any time, in the event that they "got stuck". Reflecting on this, Berry said: "We want the people who buy it, to see all the game, we do not want to lock them out".

During development, the team decided early on to focus on creating new content rather than bringing back old race tracks which were featured in previous Wipeout games. Berry, however, acknowledged that classic tracks "went down well" and sought out the possibility of introducing them through future downloadable content (DLC). Berry stated that by the end of Wipeout Pure, Studio Liverpool had designed almost 100 tracks as potentials to include in subsequent games, although the team were only satisfied with 32 of them. The remainder of the tracks were either disregarded or amalgamated into other games. Berry reflected that the tracks using the same 3D computer graphics software as its predecessor meant that certain repetition appeared and caused the team to "dry up on ideas". The developers recognised that track design was an important aspect to the game, and also accepted the difficulty in designing a track that is both memorable and enjoyable. Berry felt concerned that the team were starting to repeat design features, and thus decided to create new variables to the track design: as a result of this, the team conceptualised the "mag strip" – a section of a track which would feature artificial gravity so that a player could safely circumnavigate loops, steep slopes, and upside down sections.

After the release of Wipeout Pure on the PlayStation Portable, rumours circulated that a port was in development for the PlayStation 2. In January 2009, Sony issued a statement saying: "There are over 9.5 million PS2s in the UK and we will continue to support this large userbase with software on an ongoing basis". The PlayStation 2 version was released exclusively in Europe in June 2009, featuring enhanced graphics, two-player splitscreen mode and all of the DLC.

The game also features sixteen licensed music tracks in addition to customisable soundtracks from electronica artists, including Aphex Twin, Kraftwerk, DJ Fresh, and Skream.

== Reception ==
Reception

Aggregate score
Aggregator	Score
Metacritic	82%

Review scores
Publication	Score
Edge	7/10
Eurogamer	8/10
GameRevolution	B+
GameSpot	8/10
GameSpy	4.5/5
GameZone	9/10
IGN	8.8/10

The game received positive reviews upon release. It holds an average score of 82 percent at Metacritic, based on an aggregate of 40 reviews.

Critics unanimously praised the game's visuals and presentation. Jeff Haynes of IGN stated that the game was "Wipeout at its purest", praising the visual presentation of the courses, cities, and other environments. Gabe Graziani of GameSpy thought the graphics were beautiful and also commended the design of the tracks. Eduardo Zacarias of GameZone stated that Wipeout Pulse was a "very visually pleasing game with some solid visual effects", and also praised the detailed tracks and ships. A reviewer from Game Revolution considered the game's level of detail to the tracks and smooth frame rate to be "staggering" on a handheld. The reviewer also praised the "meticulously constructed" backdrops and "incredibly styled" presentation. Guy Cocker of GameSpot said that the visuals were "superb", though he thought that many aspects were similar to its predecessor, Wipeout Pure. A reviewer from Edge described the visuals as "even smoother, brighter, and sharper than Pure's".

The various aspects of gameplay were mostly praised, although some reviewers criticised the game's repetitiveness and difficulty. Tom Bradwell from Eurogamer praised the new "Elimination" mode, stating that it was initially "alarming" and frustrating, but admitted that it "grows to be rather good". Cocker enjoyed the new tracks, the difficulty levels, and the promise of downloadable content, although he noted that it had not been made available in the United States at the time of his review. Game Revolution's reviewer surmised that Wipeout Pulse was a more refined version of Wipeout Pure, stating that despite all of the solid and reliable gameplay, the game did not revolutionise the series. Regarding general gameplay, Zacarias opined that Wipeout Pulse "doesn't deliver" despite the variety in the game modes and "racetrack front". Haynes similarly gave a negative opinion on the gameplay, stating that the repetition of tracks and balance of weapons for the AI was disappointing. Graziani criticised the game's difficulty, saying that it was "extremely challenging to the point of being impenetrable for the uninitiated". Edge's reviewer described the game as simply another installment of Wipeout.
