= The Designers Republic =

British graphic design studio

- The "Angryman" logo
- Formation: 14 July 1986
- Founders: Ian Anderson; Nick Phillips
- Founded at: Sheffield, England
- Type: Graphic design studio
- Legal status: Company
- Website: www.thedesignersrepublic.com

Part of a series of posters for Wip3out.

The Designers Republic is a British graphic design studio based in Sheffield, England, founded in 1986 by Ian Anderson and Nick Phillips. They are best known for electronic music logos, album artwork, and anti-establishment aesthetics, embracing "brash consumerism and the uniform style of corporate brands". Work by tDR is held in the permanent collections of the Museum of Modern Art and the Victoria and Albert Museum.

The studio closed in January 2009. Anderson said that it would continue in a more "slimline" form.

== Style ==
Work by the Designers Republic generally is viewed as "playful and bright" and considered Maximum-minimalist, mixing images from Japanese anime and subvertised corporate logos with a postmodern tendency towards irony. It often features statements/slogans such as "Work Buy Consume Die", "Robots Build Robots", "Customized Terror", "Buy nothing, pay now", and "Made in the Designers Republic". They also celebrated their northern roots with phrases like "Made in the Designers Republic, North of Nowhere" and "SoYo" (referring to Sheffield's county of South Yorkshire) – affirming they were not from London's design community in Soho.

== History ==
Logotype of The Designers Republic, set in Circular Pro Bold typeface

Initially, Ian Anderson founded the Designers Republic to design flyers for the band Person to Person, which he managed at the time. His first ideas were inspired by Russian constructivism. Nick Phillips, a sculptor and the organ player in World of Twist, soon joined him, and the duo created a visual identity for Fon Records, and album cover for Chakk's 10 Days in an Elevator. This financed a studio space in the boardroom of a former engineering works.

Another early client which brought them to the wider public's attention was Leeds band Age of Chance, for whom they developed a series of record covers between 1986 and 1987, beginning with a cover of the Prince track "Kiss". The duo worked 72-hour weekly shifts, doing everything by hand using photocopiers, craft knives and spraymount.

The sleeve of the 1987 12-inch "Don't Get Mad... Get Even! (The New York Remixes)" was selected as one of Q's "100 Best Record Covers of All Time" in 2001.

Their work for Age of Chance led to further record sleeve work for Krush and Pop Will Eat Itself, for whom tDR bastardised the Pepsi logo to form the band's visual identity.

In the 1990s, they established a faux corporation branded 'Pho-Ku', to express their dislike of corporate-driven consumerist identity.

In 1994, Emigre magazine devoted a whole issue to the Designers Republic. A copy is held by MoMA. This issue is still Emigre's best-ever seller and is now sold out, changing hands for up to £750.

The Designers Republic later produced album cover designs for the electronica label Warp Records (also based in Sheffield). They designed the covers for many Warp artists, including Autechre, LFO and Aphex Twin. Their style became "the visual language of ambient techno and Sheffield pop". They also worked for other labels, designing sleeves for Moloko, Fluke, Funkstörung, The Orb, Pulp (and Jarvis Cocker), Supergrass and Towa Tei, and the New York City label Sleeping Giant Glossolalia.

Outside the music industry, tDR created the visuals, packaging and manual for the PlayStation–Sega Saturn game Wipeout (1995), the interface for the PC game Hardwar (1998), and packaging and posters for the first Grand Theft Auto (1997). They collaborated with Swatch in 1996 to design their own watch. They also designed the packaging for Sony's AIBO.

tDR has consulted on the re-branding of the city of Quito, capital of Ecuador, and was the only non-national design company to be invited to propose a new flag for Slovenia. tDR was also commissioned to create a logo and general graphic design by French musician-producer Julien Civange for its Music2titan mission to take music on the European Space Agency's Cassini–Huygens probe to the moon Titan in 2004.

On 20 January 2009, after 23 years in operation, tDR went into voluntary liquidation, Anderson bought back the company name and assets, and relaunched tDR as a smaller outfit.

== Works ==
Part of a series of posters for fetish clothing company Murray and Vern, design by tDR.

TDR have worked in a diverse range of media, including:

- Covers of CDs, vinyl records and DVDs
- Typography
- Web design
- Music video production
- Apparel design
- Packaging
- Corporate design
- Logo design
- Flyers for the Sheffield nightclub NY Sushi

== Notable clients ==
- 3MB (Juan Atkins, Moritz von Oswald, Thomas Fehlmann)
- Age of Chance
- Adidas
- Aphex Twin
- Autechre
- B12
- Clipping (band)
- Coca-Cola
- Gatecrasher
- Cartoon Network
- Electraglide Festival
- Hardfloor
- Hasbro
- JVC
- MPC
- MTV
- Nickelodeon
- Nine Inch Nails
- Nokia
- Orange
- Polygram
- Pop Will Eat Itself
- Porcupine Tree
- Pringles
- Psygnosis
- Reebok
- Rockstar Games
- Sony
- Swatch
- The Orb
- Tresor
- VH-1
- Warp Records

== Members ==
- Ian Anderson
- Nick Phillips
- Michael C. Place – Now runs Build
- David Bailey – Now runs Kiosk
- Matt Pyke – Now runs Universal Everything
- Nick Bax – Now runs Human Studio
- Martin Fewell – Now runs Yolo
- Nicole Jacek – Now runs NJ (L.A.)
- Roger Coe – Now a concept and UI artist in the games industry
- Mark Stott – Now runs Common
