= Wipeout 2097 =

1996 video game

- European PlayStation cover art
- Developer: Psygnosis (Note: Ported to Sega Saturn by Tantalus Entertainment and Perfect Entertainment. Ported to Amiga by Digital Images and by Coderus for Mac.)
- Publisher: Psygnosis (Note: Mac port published by Virtual Programming.)
- Programmers: Stewart Sockett, Chris Roberts, Nick Kimberley
- Artists: Pol Sigerson, Ashley Sanders, Nicky Westcott
- Composer: Tim Wright
- Series: Wipeout
- Platforms: PlayStation; Microsoft Windows; Sega Saturn; WarpOS; Classic Mac OS; Mac OS X; Amiga
- Release: 18 October 1996: PlayStation; EU: 18 October 1996; NA: 29 October 1996 PC; NA: 17 June 1997; EU: 27 June 1997 Sega Saturn; EU: 25 September 1997 Amiga (WarpOS) 1999 Mac OS; EU: 1 February 2002; US: 12 July 2002
- Genre: Racing
- Modes: Single-player, multiplayer

Wipeout 2097 (released as Wipeout XL in North America and Japan) is a 1996 racing video game developed and published by Psygnosis for the PlayStation. It is the second installment of the Wipeout series and a sequel to the original game, released the previous year. It was ported the following year to Microsoft Windows and the Sega Saturn, and later also to Amiga and Macintosh.

Whereas the original game introduced the F3600 anti-gravity racing league in 2052, Wipeout 2097 is set over four decades later and introduces the player to the much faster, more competitive, and more dangerous F5000 AG racing league. The game introduced a new damage interface and new weapons and tracks. The Sega Saturn version supported analogue control by using its 3D Control Pad, whereas the PlayStation version supported analogue control only through using the optional NeGcon twist controller.

Wipeout 2097 received critical acclaim upon release; reviewers praised the game for its dramatic improvements to the controls, graphics, and gameplay of the original Wipeout. The game featured a licensed electronic soundtrack featuring artists such as The Chemical Brothers and The Prodigy, an early example of modern licensed music being used in video games. Wipeout 2097 alongside its predecessor has since appeared on lists of the greatest games of all time by multiple publications.

== Gameplay ==
Gameplay from the Sega Saturn version

Gameplay in Wipeout 2097 expands upon its predecessor, introducing new circuits and weapons while retaining fundamental aspects. Players race against computer-controlled artificial opponents or other pilots, aiming to finish in the highest position possible. The game features futuristic hover vehicles that handle differently from traditional racing cars. The craft move at high speeds, with air-brakes used for cornering.

Wipeout 2097 introduces a weapons system, allowing players to eliminate opponents during races. Each vehicle has a shield energy quota, and when this reaches zero from weapon attacks or impacts, the craft is destroyed. However, the ship can be "recharged" to health at the pit stop in exchange for a precious few seconds of the race. The Quake Disruptor is a notable new weapon, causing a wave effect on the track that launches opponent vehicles into the air.

The game offers multiple difficulty levels, called classes: Vector, Venom, and Rapier. Each class increases in challenge, with higher speeds and more complex tracks. Wipeout 2097 features a progression system where players can unlock additional content. Winning gold medals across all tracks in the first three classes unlocks a full season mode. Completing this season reveals additional hidden options, including new tracks. Challenge mode takes a very single player-centric approach by only allowing progress to the next track by coming in first on the current track. Players can lose the mode by losing all three lives, which are lost by finishing a race in worse than third position.

The game includes multiple racing teams, each with vehicles that handle differently. FEISAR, the European team, offers a balanced vehicle with good turning and strong shields, suitable for beginners learning the tracks. Auricom, the American team, provides faster vehicles than FEISAR and AG Systems, designed for more experienced racers. AG Systems, the Japanese team, features a vehicle with higher speed than FEISAR's but less cornering ability. Qirex, the Russian team, offers the fastest vehicles in the game, but with reduced steering capabilities. Each team's vehicle has its own strengths and weaknesses, allowing players to choose based on their preferred driving style and skill level.

== Development ==
As with the first installment, Wipeout 2097 was developed by Liverpudlian developer Psygnosis and the promotional art was designed by Sheffield-based The Designers Republic. The development cycle ran for seven months. To cater for the increase in Wipeout players, an easier learning curve was introduced whilst keeping the difficulty at the top end for the experienced gamers. The game was originally intended as a tracks add-on for the original Wipeout. No sequel had been planned, but Andy Satterthwaite (who worked on the MS-DOS version of the original) was asked by Psygnosis to apply for the role "internal producer". He did, and during the interview, asked to do a sequel to Wipeout, but instead ended up developing extra tracks. The add-on was titled Wipeout 2097 because Psygnosis did not want to give the impression that it was a full sequel. In the United States, it went by the name of Wipeout XL because it was felt that American players would not understand the concept of the game being set a century in the future, and might confuse it for an installment number. The American title was originally to be Wipeout XS (for "Excess"), but it was pointed out that XS could also stand for "extra small". Satterthwaite ended up with a team of three coders (two of whom were new), six artists, and Nick Burcombe.

The game's look was influenced by Japanese culture because the team had worked with The Designers Republic. Nicky Westcott was the lead artist, and her team built on the original vehicle designs. She also worked with the designers and coders on the tracks. Custom tools were created in Softimage to develop the tracks, which were tweaked and the team played each other's tracks to obtain feedback. During the process, Satterthwaite realised that he could do more than the tracks add-on he was tasked with producing. Work on the tracks began in January 1996, and the plan was to select eight tracks out of twenty designed and built in a month. Their "skinning" was expected to be complete by June, with the game anticipated for release in October. Despite the work involved, Satterthwaite had three uninvolved coders. The collision code from the original Wipeout was also completely overhauled to make cornering easier by making wall grinding not bring the player to such a halt.

Burcombe wanted to improve on the original's ship handling and introduce a new weapon, which led to new power-up ideas. Westcott said that it was a collaboration between the areas because of the strict deadline. The gameplay change that had the most interest was what happened to ships that hit track edges. That ships stopped immediately in the original game was considered too harsh. It was desired that ships scraped the edges instead, and this took longer than expected to develop. Ghost vehicles were only featured in the European version because Atari had a patent on them from Hard Drivin' in the United States. The team wanted to make it possible to win races in any ship, and a challenge was to make them all feel different and to still have their worth. Months of work rebalancing the artificial intelligence was undertaken to ensure all vehicle and track settings were a challenge. Sony wanted a link-up feature, which proved difficult due to syncing issues and the frame rate differences between PAL and NTSC. Much extra content, such as more difficult tracks and a prototype ship, was added because, according to Westcott, the team were both enthusiastic and stressed, and described their development as "a period of great energy and immense exhaustion at the same time".

An entire United Kingdom nightclub tour was initiated in conjunction with the Red Bull energy drink, which was featured prominently throughout the game before the drink actually gained popularity in the American market.

The game was first unveiled in the form of a pre-alpha demo at the May 1996 Electronic Entertainment Expo. Wipeout 2097 was released in 1996 and sold around a million copies. Ports for the Sega Saturn, and Windows PC were released in 1997. Later it was also ported to Amiga by Digital Images in 1999 and to Mac OS by Coderus in 2002.

== Music ==
The original Wipeout game was one of the first racing titles to prominently feature electronic music, including tracks by artists such as Leftfield, The Chemical Brothers, and Orbital. This use of licensed music was unconventional for the time and helped establish the series’ identity. The game and its soundtrack drew heavily on the 'future UK' aesthetic of the 1990s—a style defined by techno-inspired visuals and the rise of electronic music and rave culture. Its marketing campaign, aimed at a young, club-going audience, further emphasised the connection between the game and the rave culture of the 1990s.

Wipeout 2097, released as Wipeout XL in North America, expanded upon this foundation with a soundtrack that featured a wider array of high-profile electronic music artists. Tracks by The Prodigy, Fluke, Underworld, and Photek were included, alongside returning contributors Leftfield and The Chemical Brothers. The game's music played a key role in defining its high-energy, futuristic atmosphere, with the soundtrack often being associated with the mid-90s rise of big beat and techno music. Fluke contributed the track "Atom Bomb", which was created specifically for the game and accompanied by a music video set in the Wipeout universe.

In addition to licensed tracks, Tim Wright, known as CoLD SToRAGE, contributed original compositions to the game. Wright wanted his music to emphasise slower tempos while still maintaining a driving sense of energy to match the fast-paced visuals of Wipeout 2097. To achieve this, he leaned heavily into the big beat sound, inspired by artists like The Chemical Brothers and Fatboy Slim. The style's heavy basslines, prominent drops, and use of samples allowed Wright to maintain an adrenaline-pumping atmosphere despite the slower tempo. Wright noted that it was difficult to get his tracks into the game due to the larger number of high-profile artists featured on the soundtrack.

Sony promoted Wipeout 2097 by showcasing PlayStation consoles running the game in nightclub settings. They also released a line of branded clubwear inspired by the game. Additionally, the Wipeout 2097 game disc doubled as an audio CD, allowing players to listen to the soundtrack directly, and a separate album with a different tracklist was also released.

Track listing PlayStation version
No.	Title	Writer(s)	Performer	Length
1.	"Data track"	N/A
2.	"We Have Explosive"	Garry Cobain, Brian Dougans	The Future Sound of London	5:53
3.	"Landmass"	Garry Cobain, Brian Dougans	The Future Sound of London	4:29
4.	"Atom Bomb (Straight 6 Instrumental Mix)"	Fluke	Fluke	5:33
5.	"V Six"	Fluke	Fluke	5:19
6.	"Dust up Beats"	Ed Simons, Tom Rowlands	The Chemical Brothers	6:07
7.	"Loops of Fury"	Ed Simons, Tom Rowlands	The Chemical Brothers	4:41
8.	"The Third Sequence"	Rupert Parkes	Photek	4:48
9.	"Tin There (Underworld Edit)"	Darren Emerson, Rick Smith	Underworld	6:08
10.	"Firestarter (Instrumental)"	Liam Howlett, Keith Flint	The Prodigy	4:39
11.	"Canada"	Tim Wright	CoLD SToRAGE	6:14
12.	"Body in Motion"	Tim Wright	CoLD SToRAGE	5:14

Track listing Saturn version
No.	Title	Writer(s)	Performer	Length
1.	"Kinkong"	Tim Wright	CoLD SToRAGE	4:31
2.	"Plasticity"	Tim Wright	CoLD SToRAGE	3:55
3.	"Messij Xtnd"	Tim Wright	CoLD SToRAGE	9:22
4.	"Body in Motion"	Tim Wright	CoLD SToRAGE	5:15
5.	"Canada"	Tim Wright	CoLD SToRAGE	6:13
6.	"Tenation"	Tim Wright	CoLD SToRAGE	2:42
7.	"Surgeon"	Tim Wright	CoLD SToRAGE	4:06
8.	"Body Plus" (Saturn exclusive)	Tim Wright	CoLD SToRAGE	9:22
9.	"Hakapik Murder"	Tim Wright	CoLD SToRAGE	4:08
10.	"Messij Received"	Tim Wright	CoLD SToRAGE	4:18

Track listing Mac version
No.	Title	Writer(s)	Performer	Length
1.	"Body in Motion"	Tim Wright	CoLD SToRAGE	5:15
2.	"Canada"	Tim Wright	CoLD SToRAGE	6:13
3.	"Hakapik Murder"	Tim Wright	CoLD SToRAGE	4:08
4.	"Plasticity"	Tim Wright	CoLD SToRAGE	3:55
5.	"Messij Received"	Tim Wright	CoLD SToRAGE	4:18
6.	"Surgeon"	Tim Wright	CoLD SToRAGE	4:06
7.	"Tenation"	Tim Wright	CoLD SToRAGE	2:42
8.	"Messij Xtnd"	Tim Wright	CoLD SToRAGE	9:22
9.	"Kinkong"	Tim Wright	CoLD SToRAGE	4:31

== Reception ==
Reception

Aggregate scores
Aggregator	Score
GameRankings	95%
Metacritic	93/100

Review scores
Publication	Score
AllGame	4/5 (PS); 4/5 (PC)
Edge	8/10
Famitsu	30/40 (PS)
GameSpot	8.5/10 (PS); 7.1/10 (PC)
IGN	9/10 (PS)
Next Generation	4/5 (PC)
PC PowerPlay	75% (PC)
Sega Saturn Magazine	92% (SAT)

=== PlayStation ===
In the United Kingdom, it was among the nineteen best-selling PlayStation games of 1996, according to HMV.

Air Hendrix scored the PlayStation version a perfect 5 out of 5 in every category (FunFactor, control, sound, and graphics) in GamePro, citing "across-the-board innovations" over the already excellent original WipeOut. He particularly remarked that the controls are much more refined, fairer, and easier to master, and that the frame rate and graphical effects are much more impressive. Tom Ham of GameSpot also commented on the control improvements and approved of the new ability to destroy opponents. Additionally praising the elaborate backgrounds, detailed sound effects, and more aggressive A.I., he deemed it "a must buy." IGN said that it had topped the original in terms of music, number of simultaneous racers, A.I., weapons, and graphics, and concluded, "It's games like this that make you proud to be a PlayStation owner." In 1996, Next Generation ranked Wipeout 2097 as the 32nd top game of all time for how "playing linked Wipeout comes close to gaming at its very best", noting that the game could have been a technology demonstration for PlayStation. Edge gave both the PlayStation and Sega Saturn versions a score of 8 out of 10, with similar remarks of its improved graphics and its gameplay.

Electronic Gaming Monthly editors awarded Wipeout 2097 Best Music of 1996 and a runner-up (behind Super Mario 64) for Best Graphics. In 1997, The Official PlayStation Magazine named it the fifth top PlayStation game yet, and Electronic Gaming Monthly named the PlayStation version the 96th best game of all time, calling it "the first game of the cyberpunk-esque 'electronic age,' before the electronic age was just a hype-filled buzzword." In IGN's top 25 PlayStation games of all-time list it ranked 13th, noted for being often considered the PlayStation's best racing game of its time and was chosen ahead of others in the series because Wipeout 2097 was "the one they preferred to keep coming back to". In 2003, Wipeout 2097 was inducted into GameSpot's list of the greatest games of all time. It ranks as the third-best PlayStation game at GameRankings with an average review score of 94.75% from ten different sources.

=== Ports ===
Rich Leadbetter of Sega Saturn Magazine commented that the Saturn version, while not as good as the PlayStation original, is a much closer conversion than the Saturn port of the first Wipeout, particularly in terms of the fluidity, control, and sense of speed. He deemed it the second best racing game on the Saturn, exceeded only by Sega Rally Championship.

Jeff Gerstmann reviewed the PC version in GameSpot, assessing that "The PC version's Direct3D support gives this new release a nice face-lift, while still keeping intact the fast action and stylized graphics that console players have come to know and love." He said that the new soundtrack, while good, is a disappointment compared to the PlayStation version's techno tracks, but gave the game a strong recommendation. Next Generation stated that "If you have a 3D accelerator of any sort, you owe it to yourself to pick up this game. Its nearly flawless gameplay, pumping soundtrack, and visual excellence mark it as a showcase title and all around good time."
