= History of the Amiga =

Amiga is a family of home computers that were designed and sold by the Amiga Corporation (and later by Commodore International) from 1985 to 1994.

== Amiga Corporation ==
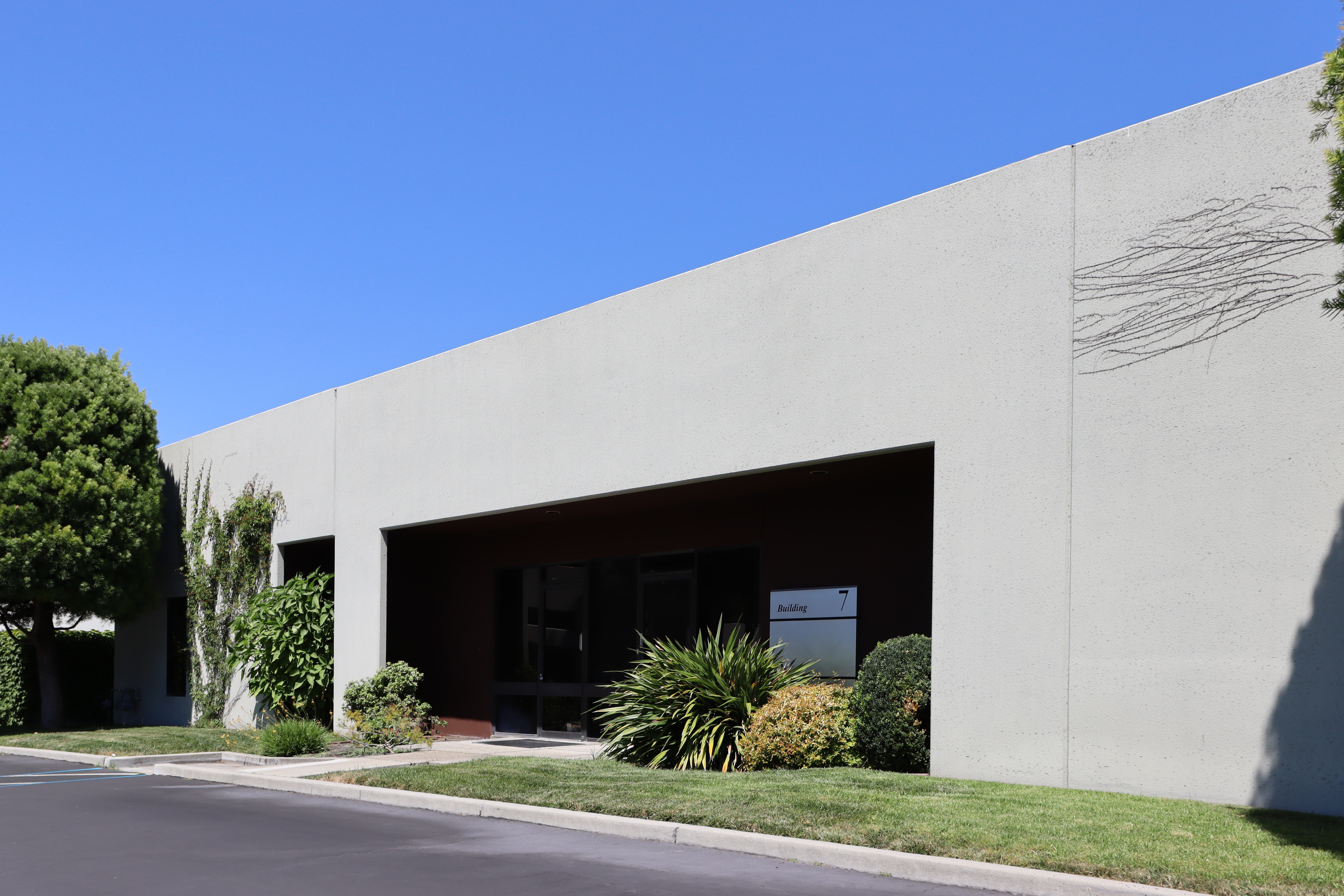
Amiga's first headquarters in Santa Clara

The Amiga's Original Chip Set, code-named Lorraine, was designed by the Amiga Corporation during the end of the first home video game boom. Development of the Lorraine project was done using a Sage IV machine nicknamed "Agony" which had 64-kbit memory modules with a capacity of 1 mbit and a 8 MHz CPU. Amiga Corp. funded the development of the Lorraine by manufacturing game controllers, and later with an initial bridge loan from Atari Inc. while seeking further investors. The chipset was to be used in a video game machine, but following the video game crash of 1983, the Lorraine was reconceived as a multi-tasking multi-media personal computer.

The company demonstrated a prototype at the January 1984 Consumer Electronics Show (CES) in Chicago, attempting to attract investors. The Sage acted as the CPU, and BYTE described "big steel boxes" substituting for the chipset that did not yet exist. The magazine reported in April 1984 that Amiga Corporation "is developing a 68000-based home computer with a custom graphics processor. With 128K bytes of RAM and a floppy-disk drive, the computer will reportedly sell for less than $1000 late this year."

Further presentations were made at the following CES in June 1984, to Sony, HP, Philips, Apple, Silicon Graphics, and others. Steve Jobs of Apple, who had just introduced the Macintosh in January, was shown the original prototype for the first Amiga and stated that there was too much hardware – even though the newly redesigned board consisted of just three silicon chips which had yet to be shrunk down. Investors became increasingly wary of new computer companies in an industry dominated by the IBM PC. Jay Miner, co-founder, lead engineer and architect, took out a second mortgage on his home to keep the company from going bankrupt.

In July 1984, Atari Inc. was bought by the recently resigned CEO and founder of Commodore, Jack Tramiel. A substantial number of Commodore's employees followed him, prompting a lawsuit from Commodore for theft of trade secrets. Tramiel's son Leonard later discovered that Atari Inc. had lent $500,000 to the Amiga Corporation, with repayment due at the end of June, prompting Atari Corp. to counter Commodore.

In a subsequent development, the Amiga group received interested from Commodore, and began discussions of selling the company. In August 1984, Amiga was purchased by Commodore for $27 million, including paying off the loan from Atari.

== Commodore ==
=== 1985–87: the early years ===
When the first Amiga computer was released in July 1985 by Commodore, it was called the Amiga 1000, devoid of references to Commodore. Commodore marketed it both as their successor to the Commodore 64, and as their competitor against the Macintosh. It was later renamed the Commodore Amiga 1000.

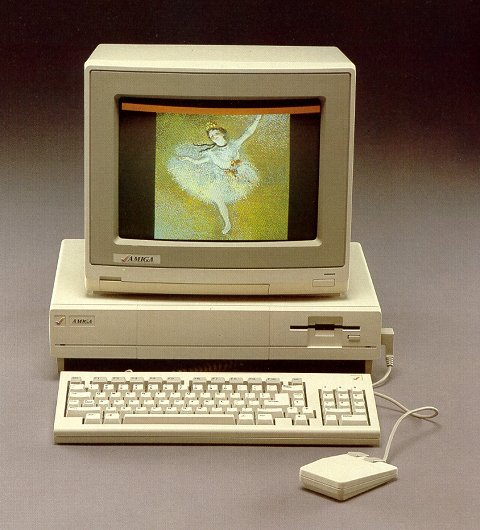
The Amiga 1000's graphics abilities were significantly ahead of its rivals.

At a relatively affordable base price of US$1,295 (equivalent to $3,877 in 2025), the Amiga could display up to 4,096 colors, produce 8-bit stereo audio, and run several applications concurrently. These qualities were unprecedented in a consumer-oriented computer and gave the Amiga 1000 a significant technical lead on its three main competitors (the Atari ST, the Macintosh, and the IBM PC).

The public saw both Commodore and Atari selling, as John C. Dvorak wrote, "cheap disposable" game machines, and observers believed that either the ST or Amiga would survive, but not both. The ST had more software in the beginning, but larger companies like Electronic Arts and Activision promised to make software for the Amiga. Neither had distribution from major chains like ComputerLand or BusinessLand, or support from large business-software companies like Microsoft, Ashton-Tate, or Lotus. The New York Times stated that "it is not clear that the business computer user really cares about colorful graphics". The computers' sophisticated graphics strengthened their perception as "game machines".

Poorly marketed, the Amiga 1000 was not a success. An August 1986 Compute! editorial expressed amazement that Commodore, insisting that the Amiga was a business computer, did not show it at the summer CES. The magazine estimated that in their first year of availability, the Atari ST had outsold the Amiga. Stating that the "industry needs the vision and direction that a Commodore can help provide", it urged the company to pursue the consumer market that had been very successful for the Commodore 64. Jerry Pournelle from BYTE praised the Amiga Sidecar as "really impressive", and approved of the "great deal of Amiga software" at Spring COMDEX, but wondered "whether Commodore has enough high-tech people to support the Amiga properly" after large layoffs, while "Atari ST software pours forth like a flood". Bruce Webster reported in January 1987 that Commodore had sold about 150,000 Amigas as of October 1986, but "imagine how many [the company] might have sold if they had done things right". He criticized many aspects of Commodore's handling of the computer, including selling "not-quite-finished" hardware and software, not supporting third-party developers, poor advertising, and internal uncertainty of the Amiga's target market. Aware of its reputation, Commodore asked the press to call the computer "The Amiga, from Commodore" and designed new logos to replace its own iconic "C=" design. Commodore compounded the problem by marketing the new 8-bit Commodore 128 alongside the Amiga, confusing the general public about Commodore's direction and the Amiga's advantages.

By 1987, rumors spread that the size of the Amiga market disappointed software vendors, which were uncertain of Commodore's intention for the computer. Bing Gordon of Electronic Arts, which had prominently supported the Amiga, stated that year that "the Amiga has never done as well as we had hoped when we started out", and that Electronic Arts had expected Commodore to sell it as a $600 high-end home computer instead of an $1800 business computer. The best-selling Amiga games sold about 25,000 copies in 1986, said Gordon, compared to 125,000 to 150,000 copies on the Commodore 64. In 1994 BYTE wrote "The Amiga was so far ahead of its time that almost nobody – including Commodore's marketing department – could fully articulate what it was all about. Today, it's obvious the Amiga was the first multimedia computer, but in those days it was derided as a game machine because few people grasped the importance of advanced graphics, sound, and video." This marketing confusion would plague the Amiga throughout its lifetime, even as it changed hands between Escom, Gateway, and other owners.

=== 1987–90: Cost-reduced and high-end models ===
In 1987, faced with strong competition from Atari ST in the lower end of the segment, Commodore released the cost-reduced Amiga 500 and the high-end Amiga 2000, for the respective prices of US$699 and $2395 (this price included 1 MB RAM and a monitor).

By 1988, software sales for the Amiga remained disappointing, compared to those for the IBM PC, Commodore 64, and Apple II. With its lowered price, the Amiga 500 became a successful home computer and eventually outsold its main rival, the Atari ST. The Amiga 2000, thanks to its Genlock and internal expansion slots, also managed to carve out a market niche within desktop video. This market was not as large as the office and publishing markets dominated by the IBM PC and Apple Macintosh, and the Amiga 2000 lagged behind these systems in sales. Additionally, Commodore had initially announced a price of $1495 for 2000, resulting in widespread disappointment among their customer base when the higher price was made public. This was also the case for the A500, which Commodore announced its price as $595.95, but later released it at $699. The Amiga did see widespread use in the television and video production industry during the late 1980s and early 1990s, including on popular shows like Clarissa Explains It All and Unsolved Mysteries.

=== 1990–92: Height of popularity ===
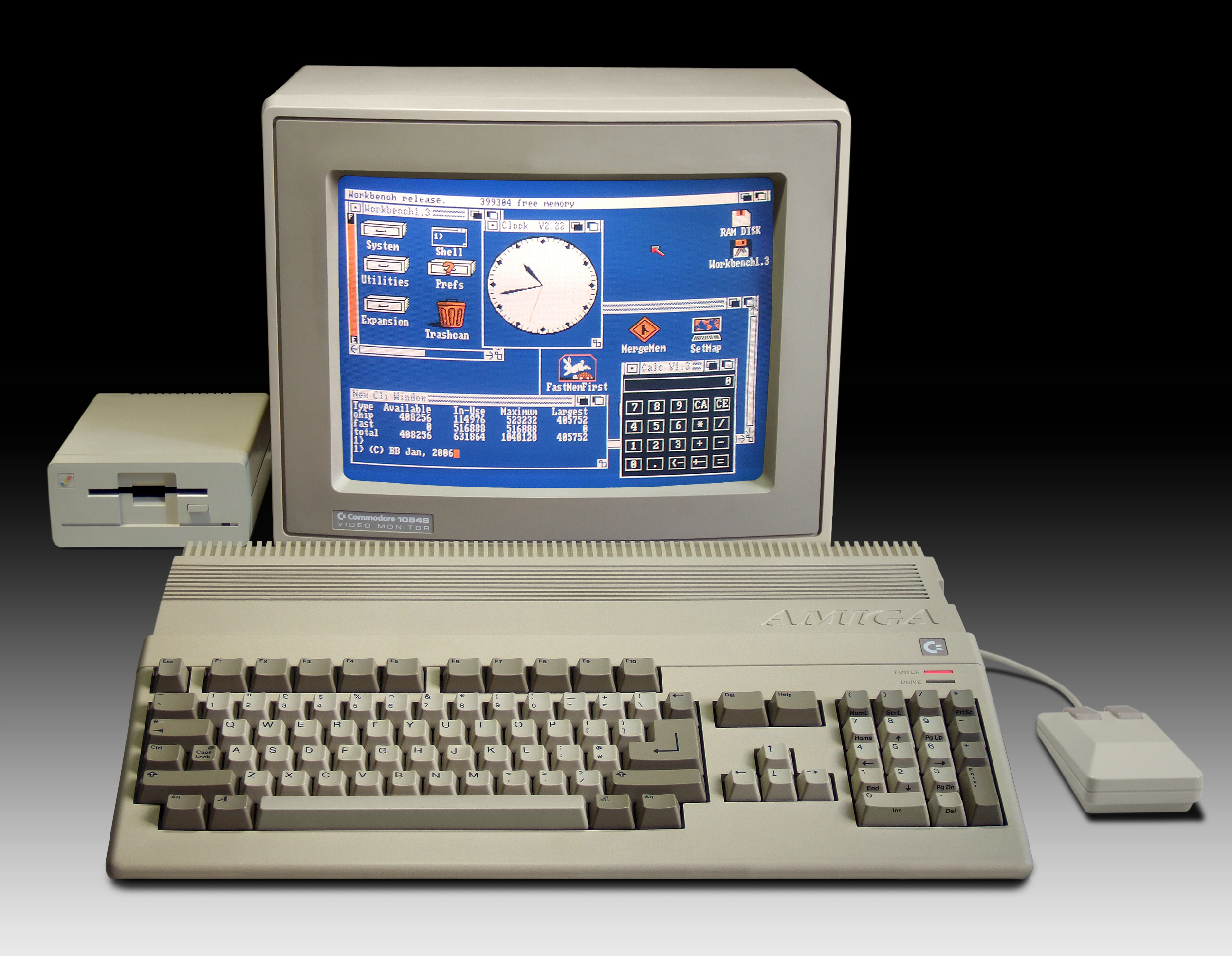
An Amiga 500, with 1084S RGB monitor and A1010 floppy disk drive. (1987)

In 1990, Commodore released a significant update of the Amiga platform, in the shape of the Amiga 3000 featuring an enhanced chipset (ECS) and the second release of its operating system, commonly referred to as Workbench 2.0.

Commodore had a poor reputation among consumers and developers. Computer Gaming World wrote in 1990 of its "abysmal record of customer and technical support in the past". Commodore was unable to match the pace of PC advancement with their lower resources and economy of scale, and users complained that the custom ECS chipset failed to match the features of the PC and Mac display hardware at the time. Users also felt that the operating system (Workbench 2.0) only featured improvements taken from the user community. As Apple was the only other major user of Motorola chips at the time, Commodore often had to wait for a new CPU technology until increased supplies allowed Motorola to sell chips to anyone but Apple.

On the plus side, many users considered the Amiga 3000 the most well-engineered Amiga model, and the Amiga 3000's integrated flicker fixer made it painless to use inexpensive PC-style VGA monitors.

In the same year as the Amiga 3000, Commodore released the US$895 CDTV, aimed to move the Amiga platform to the living room and a competitor to devices such as Philips CD Interactive (CD-i). Commodore believed that there was a market for a system that could display animations, pictures and offer educational software and games on television, and many game developers thought that interactive CD-based video games would become a popular market. The end result was a system that could be described as an Amiga 500 with a remote control replacing the keyboard and a CD-ROM replacing the floppy drive.

Considering that the Amiga 500 was cheaper, more versatile, and had the promise of a future CDTV expansion, few Amiga users had any interest in the Amiga CDTV. At the same time, the general public preferred cheaper game consoles over both the CDTV and CD-i, and they were not aware of or interested in the multimedia potential of these CD-ROM based systems.

Both Commodore and Philips tried to tempt users with the promise of an MPEG-1 module capable of playing video from a CD-ROM. These Video CDs can be considered lower-resolution versions of today's Digital Versatile Disks (DVDs), but without some additional features and the inconvenience of having to change the disks during a full-length movie.

The CDTV became Commodore's first Amiga-based failure, one that allegedly cost them a significant amount of resources. Commodore made a last-ditch effort in saving the system with the CDTV 2 but dropped that design in favor of the much more capable Amiga CD32.

=== 1992–94: Trouble ahead ===
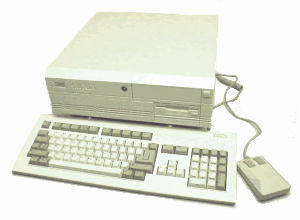
An Amiga 4000 (1992)

Commodore began 1992 early by introducing the Amiga 500+, a slightly updated and cost-reduced Amiga 500. Viewed primarily as a game machine, especially in Europe, this model was criticized for not being able to run popular games such as SWIV, Treasure Island Dizzy, and Lotus Esprit Turbo Challenge, and some people returned them to dealers, demanding an original Amiga 500.

By the early 1990s, the IBM PC platform dominated the market for computer games. In December 1992, Computer Gaming World (CGW) reported that MS-DOS accounted for 82% of game sales in 1991, compared to Macintosh's 8% and Amiga's 5%. In response to a reader's challenge to find a DOS game that played better than the Amiga version the magazine cited Wing Commander and Civilization, and added that "The heavy MS-DOS emphasis in CGW merely reflects the realities of the market". Instead of discontinuing the Amiga 500 and 500+, Commodore envisioned it taking the place of the Commodore 64 in the low-cost segment. To make that possible Commodore set out to design the Amiga 600, a system intended to be much cheaper than the Amiga 500. The Amiga 500 itself would be replaced by Amiga 1200, also under development.

Commodore had the new machines (A600) manufactured in Australia and launched them on what it assumed would be an eager market. Unfortunately, soon afterward it announced that two new super-Amigas would be released.

— Edge, August 1995

Shortly after releasing the Amiga 600, Commodore announced that two new super Amigas would be released at the end of the year. In classic Osborne style, consumers decided to wait for the new Amigas and Commodore had to close their Australian office in face of plummeting sales. At the same time, Commodore's foray into the highly competitive PC market was unsuccessful. This contributed to Commodore's 1992 profits falling to an unimpressive $28 million, and made the need for a successful new Amiga launch all that more critical.

In October 1992, Commodore released the Amiga 1200 and the Amiga 4000. Each featured the new AGA chipset and the third release of AmigaOS.

Computer Gaming World reported in March 1993 that declining Amiga sales were "causing many U.S. publishers to quit publishing Amiga titles", and in July that at the Spring European Computer Trade Show the computer was, unlike 1992, "hardly mentioned, let alone seen". That year Commodore marketed the CD32, which was one of the earliest CD-based consoles and was also the world's first 32-bit game machine, with specifications similar to the A1200.

The last Amiga (and the last computer) released by Commodore was the A4000T, in 1994.

=== Amiga in the United States ===
Mass-market Amigas were considerably cheaper than PCs and Macintoshes at the time. This factor helped to boost sales in European markets, but it also continued Commodore's misfortune of being viewed in the more price-conscious US markets as a producer of cheap "toy computers" and "game machines". This perception was furthered by the fact that most Commodore retail outlets were toy stores, and marketing campaigns were mismatched with the public's needs and wants. Overall, the Amiga was very successful in Europe, but it sold less than a million units in the US.

Additionally, in the US market, the IBM PC was already a dominant market force, especially in the workplace. Potential buyers' first question was often, "Is it IBM compatible?", allowing the user to "take work home" or more often, take software home to install on their own machines. To satisfy these users, Commodore introduced a variety of PC-compatibility add-ons, such as the Amiga Sidecar for the Amiga 1000, the Bridge Board for the A2000, and a 5.25" floppy disk drive to facilitate data exchange with PC disks. Even as Commodore was improving the Amiga's interoperability, the PC's graphics drastically improved from the early mediocre CGA and EGA modes prevalent at the Amiga's introduction to VGA and SVGA, which appeared to match or exceed the Amiga's abilities. This caused a raft of PC gaming titles to be introduced during the late 1980s and early 1990s, including many ported from Amiga versions. Consumers began to see no advantage in the Amiga's "incompatible" technology. Commodore's attempts at interoperability did not persuade users concerned about IBM compatibility to buy an Amiga. Instead, inexpensive PC clones were beginning to flood the US market. As a result, US Amiga users tended to be technophiles enamored of the Amiga's software or hardware capabilities, Commodore loyalists upgrading from the C-64 or 128, iconoclasts who disliked IBM, video and graphic arts enthusiasts, or professionals – the desktop video market was one of the few areas where the Amiga would gain widespread adoption in the US outside of the home.

=== Bankruptcy ===
In 1993, Commodore lost a staggering $357 million.

— Edge, August 1995 edition

Commodore management voluntarily filed for Chapter 11 under US bankruptcy laws in late April 1994. Chapter 11 US rules allow a firm to recover its debts and reorganize it. Commodore was reorganized in various occasions twice before and repaid by Irving Gould without requesting filing for Chapter 11, but this time, as being controlled by US bankruptcy laws, the court-appointed board of trustees decided to liquidate the company without proceeding to reorganization. The majority of Commodore's assets and name were sold to Escom. Production was halted briefly until it was restarted for a short time under Escom's Amiga Technologies. Though the machines had been upgraded and had plentiful hardware and software support, the lack of new Amigas meant that vendors sooner or later moved on. Most of the technology hobbyists and productivity market moved to PC architecture, sometimes running Linux or BeOS in preference to Microsoft Windows.

Due to the fierce loyalty of some Amiga fans, the 'scene' continued for many year after the last original Amiga was sold. Inevitably, the PC eventually became the undisputed leading home computing technology, and the console wars also left the CD32 behind.

The rights to the Amiga platform were successively sold to Escom, and later, Gateway 2000. Escom had almost immediately gone bankrupt itself (due to non-Amiga related problems), while Gateway decided to keep the patents and sell the remaining assets to a new company later renamed to Amiga, Inc., of Snoqualmie, Washington (no relation to the original Amiga Corporation) in 1999. Amiga also received a license to use Amiga-related patents, which were retained by Gateway until they expired. Amiga Inc. sold the copyrights for works created up to 1993 to Cloanto, and commissioned development of AmigaOS 4 to Hyperion Entertainment.

== New Amigas ==
Since the end of the Commodore-Amiga, there have been many attempts to create new Amiga hardware and solutions. All new Amigas are built from standard components without using the original Commodore custom chips.

=== Amiga compatibles ===
Only Amiga compatible machines share the original Amiga heritage with the custom chip compatibility. While they are not using the original chips (as in original Amiga computers), they implement compatible functionality using their field-programmable gate arrays (FPGA) or custom bootloaders.

==== DraCo ====
The DraCo was the first Amiga clone. It was released during the bankruptcy of Commodore International in 1994 and was sold until 2000. Unlike later systems employing FPGA for the custom chipset, the Draco only provided compatibility at the operating system level and used a bootloader to patch various system devices and libraries that attempted to directly access any real Amiga chips. It was never intended to be a 'general purpose' desktop computer, however, users have been able to get some models to boot to Workbench.

==== Minimig ====
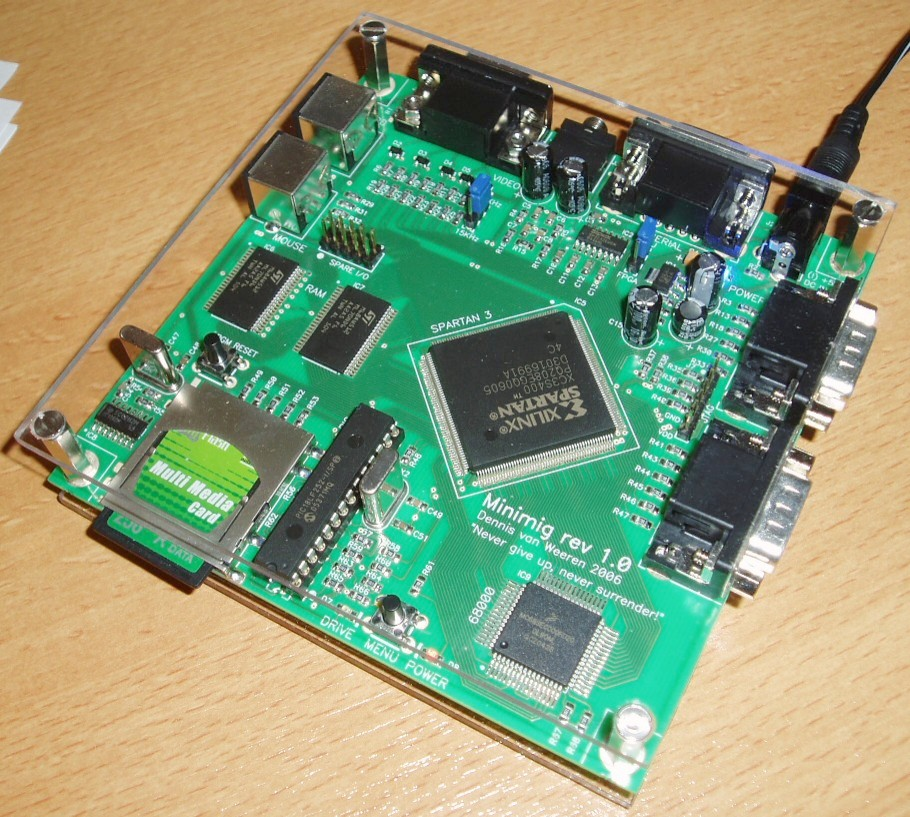
Minimig 120×120 mm PCB (Nano-ITX size)

Minimig is an open source hardware implementation of the Amiga 500 with the custom chipset implemented using a FPGA, released under the GNU General Public License. It uses the MC68000 CPU chip from Freescale and supports overclocking up to 50 MHz. The size of the FPGA limited the MiniMig to a subset of the ECS graphics, lacking support for productivity modes on the real chipset. It was also limited to only 2 MB of memory that was artificially split into ROM, "chip", and "fast" segments with an aftermarket 'hack' that could increase it to 4 MB total.

==== Natami ====
Natami was a hardware project to build 68k-based computers to run AmigaOS. While the original project is defunct, many of the core members of Natami have moved onto the Vampire project.

==== Vampire V4 Standalone ====
Vampire V4 Standalone is an FPGA Amiga-compatible developed by Apollo Accelerators. It is built around the Apollo Core 68080 (AC68080) first launched in the V2 line of accelerators, the V500 and V600, which are compatible with the Amiga 500 and Amiga 600, respectively. Although not originally designed as such, the V500 has also been installed in the original Amiga 1000 and Amiga 2000 desktop systems, as these all used the same, socketed version of the original Motorola 68000 processor. While the V2 was only designed as an accelerator, it was equipped with local memory, Ethernet, microSD and retargetable graphics (RTG), named "SAGA" or Super-AGA.

The V4 is designed to replace the V2 V500 model as an accelerator, as well as operate entirely independently of any computer in a so-called "standalone mode". To accomplish this, Apollo Accelerators has built a cleanroom version of the AGA chipset and added direct support classic DB9-based joysticks and various low or full-speed USB 2.0 peripherals such as mice, keyboard and gamepads. Amiga AGA graphics are automatically upscaled to HDMI (576p) resolution and can switch automatically between classic and SAGA display modes for use with modern LCD monitors and televisions.

As of August 2019, the AC68080 is the fastest 680x0-compatible Amiga processor with more than four times the performance of the previously fastest, the Motorola 68060. It is capable of 192.12 MIPS and 102.06 MFLOPS, while the Cyberstorm 68060 at 50 MHz was capable of only 39.29 MIPS and 28.02 MFLOPS. Performance gains are aided by using modern DDR3 memory which is capable of over 500 MiB/s in all memory regions. In contrast, the original Amiga processors were significantly bottlenecked accessing shared "chip" memory, achieving less than 3 MiB/s on OCS and ECS machines, and no more than 6.5 MiB/s on AGA machines with all chipsets having DMA disabled.

The AC68080 is closed source, although it may be available for licensing. It is designed to use the original, closed-source Commodore AmigaOS (up to and including the most recent AmigaOS 3.1.4 release from Hyperion), but can also run AROS, EmuTOS, and FreeMiNT, as well as the Classic Macintosh OS.

==== Amiga Components ====
A number of suppliers have begun to spring up to provide components to allow users to build their own Amiga compatibles. This includes new motherboards and cases. intended to be combined with either an emulator or an FPGA.

=== AmigaOS 4 systems ===
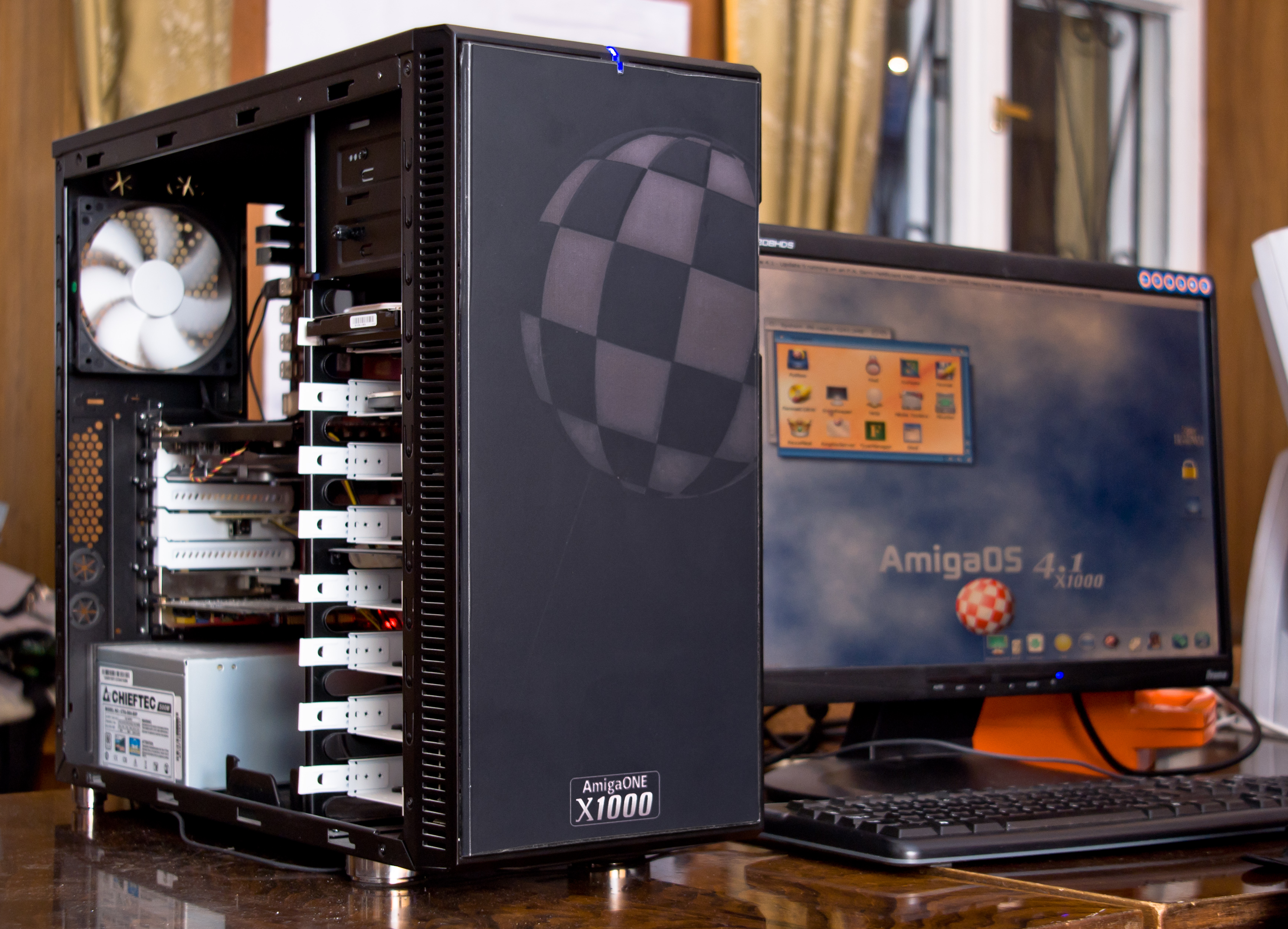
AmigaOne X1000 running AmigaOS 4.1

In early 2007 The Inquirer reported that the Amiga was inching closer to rebirth with the long-awaited release of AmigaOS 4.0 (OS4), a new PowerPC-native version of the classic AmigaOS (Motorola 68k) from the 1980s, developed by Hyperion Entertainment. This new PowerPC OS would run on AmigaOne machines, now out of production; before the release of OS4, most AmigaOne users were relying on Linux for a functioning operating system.

Hyperion began development of AmigaOS 4.0 in 2001 but did not give it its first public demonstration until 2004. The five year development process led to accusations of vapourware, especially given that Hyperion claimed that they had the original AmigaOS 3.1 source code to reference (a claim later proven accurate). This was made worse by the apparent much more rapid progress and maturity of competitor and alternative AmigaOS clone MorphOS, which had been begun several years earlier. Perhaps the most important feature of OS4 is the presence of an entirely new PowerPC native kernel. ExecSG replaces the original Amiga Exec and is claimed entirely the work and property of Hyperion's subcontracted developers Thomas and Hans-Joerg Frieden. Neither Amiga, Inc. nor Hyperion actually own ExecSG, so technically cannot demand or hand it over, leaving the OS with fragmented and confused ownership.

In April 2007, Amiga, Inc. also announced a new AmigaOS 4 compatible system that would be available shortly. The new machine was neither Genesi's Efika, nor the project codenamed Samantha, (now known as the Sam440ep from ACube Systems). The new hardware was from a new entrant, the Canadian company ACK Software Controls, and would have consisted of a budget and advanced model.

AmigaOS 4 also runs on the Sam440 line developed by ACube Systems, following an agreement Hyperion. It also runs on Pegasos II systems developed by Genesi/bPlan and AmigaOne systems developed by British Eyetech and A-eon Technologies. AmigaOS 4 can run system-friendly AmigaOS software written for original Commodore Amigas.

AmigaOS 4 provides backward-compatibility to 68K software through tiered emulation. If the program is known to be OS-friendly (it does not attempt to access hardware directly), then a lightweight JIT emulator is used and calls are allowed directly to AmigaOS 4's API which remains largely compatible to AmigaOS 3.x. However, if the program is not known, or is known to access hardware directly, then it will be executed using E-UAE.

==== Legal disputes regarding AmigaOS 4 ====
Four days after Amiga, Inc., of Snoqualmie, Washington, announced the new OS4-compatible machines, they sued Hyperion. Amiga, Inc. stated that it decided to produce a PowerPC version of AmigaOS in 2001 and on November 3, 2001, they signed a contract with Hyperion (then a game developer for the 68k Amiga platform as well as Linux and Macintosh). Amiga, Inc. gave Hyperion access to the sources of the last Commodore version, AmigaOS 3.1, but access to the post-Commodore versions OS 3.5 and 3.9 had to be purchased from Haage & Partner, since they had developed them, but never returned the source code to Amiga, Inc.

Amiga, Inc. also said that its contract allowed Hyperion to use Amiga trademarks in the promotion of OS4 on Eyetech's AmigaOne and stipulated that Hyperion should make its best efforts to deliver OS 4 by March 1, 2002, a port of an elderly operating system (68k) for an entirely different processor architecture (PowerPC) in four months, an optimistic target that Hyperion failed to meet.

According to Amiga, Inc., the contract permits the purchase of the full sources of OS4 from Hyperion for US$25,000. The court filing says that Amiga, Inc. paid this sometime in April–May 2003, to keep Hyperion from going bankrupt, and that between then and November 21, 2006, Amiga, Inc. paid another $7,200, then $8,850 more which it says Hyperion said was owing.

Furthermore, in the filing, Amiga, Inc. President Bill McEwen revealed that Amiga, Inc. still had not received the sources for AmigaOS 4, that he had discovered that much of its development was outsourced to third-party contract developers, and that it was not clear if Hyperion had all the rights to this external work. Eventually, after five years and $41,050, on 21 November 2006, Amiga, Inc. told Hyperion it had violated the contract and gave it 30 days to finish the product and hand over the sources. That did not happen, so the contract was terminated. on 20 December 2006. Hyperion claims in its defense that Amiga, Inc. rendered the contract null through dealings with KMOS, a company which acquired the Amiga assets and renamed itself Amiga, Inc. over 2004–05.

Four days later, on 24 December 2006, Hyperion released the final version of OS4 – although according to Amiga, Inc., Hyperion claims that this was merely an update of the developers' preview version of 16 April 2004. Since the contract ended, Hyperion had no rights to use the name AmigaOS or any Amiga intellectual property, or to market OS4 or enter into any agreements about it with anyone else. Nevertheless, AmigaOS 4 was still being developed and distributed. Furthermore, ACube Systems released a series of Sam440ep motherboards, which run AmigaOS 4.

For a time, the case seemed deadlocked with neither side being apparently able to prove the point either way. Without Amiga, Inc.'s permission, Hyperion Entertainment could not use the AmigaOS name or related trademarks. Hyperion's defense centered around the potentially contract-voiding nature of the Amiga, Inc./KMOS handover, the problems they faced in acquiring the post-Commodore OS 3.x source code which Amiga, Inc. claimed to own and have access to, and the presence of new work and open components in the new operating system.

On 30 September 2009, Hyperion and Amiga, Inc. reached a settlement agreement where Hyperion was granted an exclusive, perpetual and worldwide right to distribute and use 'The Software', a term used during the dispute and subsequent settlement to refer to source code from AmigaOS 3 and earlier, and ownership of AmigaOS 4.x and beyond.

=== AROS systems ===
AROS is an open-source re-implementation of AmigaOS and is designed more for portability. The features of the first attempts replicated those found in the AmigaOS 3.1. It runs on many x86-based systems as native or hosted flavors. AROS also runs on some 68k-based Amigas and PowerPC systems. There are also sellers of 'AresOne' systems dedicated to run AROS only. Unlike many other Amiga-based solutions, AROS is Amiga binary compatible only on 68k-based systems. This version is recognized for its high degree of compatibility at the source-code level, allowing it to make concessions towards the legacy deficiencies of the OS it was based from.

=== MorphOS systems ===
MorphOS is a closed-source re-implementation of AmigaOS. It runs on PowerPC-based systems but can run system-friendly AmigaOS software written for the original Commodore Amigas. MorphOS runs on Efika, Pegasos I/II, AmigaOne X5000 and PowerPC based Apple Mac G4 models, such as the Mac Mini, eMac, PowerMac, PowerBook, and iBook.
