= Sage computer =

Sage computer may refer to:

- SAGE Computer Technology. m68k computer system company in the 1980s
- Semi-Automatic Ground Environment (SAGE), a system of mainframe computers and networking equipment that directed and controlled NORAD response to a possible Soviet air attack between the late 1950s and the 1980s. It was the largest, most powerful, and most expensive computer system ever at the time of its construction.

== See also ==
- AN/FSQ-7, a computerized command and control system used in the USAF Semi-Automatic Ground Environment (SAGE) air defense network
