= Space Shuttle Mission 2007 =

Space Shuttle stand-alone mission simulator for Microsoft Windows

- Developer: Exciting Simulations
- Publisher: Simsquared Ltd.
- Platform: Microsoft Windows
- Release: January 2008/June 2011
- Genre: Simulation
- Mode: Single-player

Space Shuttle Mission 2007 is a Space Shuttle stand-alone mission simulator for Microsoft Windows. The simulator was released on January 1, 2008 after having been under development for more than six years.

== Gameplay ==
The main purpose of Space Shuttle Mission 2007 is to allow the gamer to experience real historical NASA Space Shuttle missions from liftoff (T-00:01:50:00) to landing. Initially, Space Shuttle Mission 2007 was released with a set of 11 missions but as time passed, the development team has been releasing new missions as free add-ons. The missions include satellite deployment and servicing (including the Hubble Space Telescope), building and servicing the International Space Station, extra-vehicular activities and landing at Kennedy Space Center and Edwards Air Force Base.

A typical mission starts on the launch pad at KSC right after the astronauts have entered the cockpit. After that, the user goes through the preflight, liftoff, ascent, on-orbit, de-orbit, approach and landing phases. Most of the time is spent on orbit where the user is expected to perform the mission as described in the briefing screen and as instructed by the on-screen checklists and audio communications from the MCC. Landing is performed manually following Houston instructions and realistic guidance and navigation information presented on the 9 forward panels MFD and the fully collimated HUD. The action during all mission phases can be viewed from several "cameras": external view, first person, floating camera and Mission Control Center information screens. After completing the mission successfully from start to end, the virtual Astronaut receives a mission badge which is displayed in the Astronaut Achievements section.

The Space Shuttle Mission 2007 simulates Space Shuttle systems, including the general-purpose computer, remote manipulator system, auxiliary power unit, hydraulic, CCTV, electrical, propulsion, navigation, APDS (docking system), communications, and payload bay. These are intended to allow for a realistic interaction between the user and these systems throughout the mission. As the mission evolves, the simulator presents the user with an on-screen context-related checklist, indicating which systems to operate and how. In the easiest difficulty mode, the simulator indicates individual switches with flashing arrows, in addition to the checklists. In more advanced difficulty modes, the user is expected to use printed checklists to complete the mission.

The user spends most of the time in a realistic and complete 3D virtual cockpit, manning several "stations": commander, pilot, mission specialist 1, mission specialist 2, and a mission specialist middeck position. The 3D virtual cockpit is especially effective due to the support of TrackIR:PRO head-tracking device, Matrox TripleHead2Go multiple monitor support and the Vuzix virtual reality stereoscopic goggles. The in-cockpit and other environmental sounds are simulated including the engines, RCS, alarms, and cockpit cooling "humming".

The user can zoom into various panels in a 2D view or directly select the various systems from the main menu, in real time and press buttons, turn knobs, flip switches as the mission requires. There is also constant and context-relevant mission-related audio communications between the Mission Control Center and the Space Shuttle guiding the user through the mission.

Extra-vehicular activities are conducted in first-person view. In certain missions, the virtual astronauts will also drive the Manned Maneuvering Unit to capture satellites for maintenance. The latest mission add-on is the STS-47 Spacelab mission. In this mission, the user can visit the Spacelab-J and float inside the lab in Zero-G.

== See also ==
- Virgin Space Shuttle Simulator
- Space Shuttle program
- Space flight simulator game
