= X100 =

X100 or X-100 may refer to:

- Curtiss-Wright X-100, an experimental aircraft with tilt rotors
- Fujifilm X100, a series of digital cameras
- X-100 (house), an experimental steel house in California
- Lotus M90 (also Lotus X100), a concept car
- New South Wales X100 class locomotive, a group of rail tractors built by Chullora Railway Workshops
- Rockman X100, a model of headphone amplifier by Scholz Research & Development, Inc.
- RT.X100, a real-time PCI video editing card
- Triton X-100, a nonionic surfactant
- SS-100-X, US President Kennedy's state car in which he was assassinated in 1963
