= Matrox Simple Interface =

Matrox Simple Interface (in short MSI) is the name of a proprietary DOS and Windows 95 application programming interface for Matrox Mystique graphics cards made by Matrox. MSI API supported a maximum of 640x480x16 resolution with z-buffer and no bilinear filtering. It used color look up tables to save memory. When Matrox released the Matrox m3D (using the PowerVR PCX2 chipset), MSI was completely abandoned.
