= Parhelia =

Parhelia may refer to:

- Parhelia (phenomenon), the scientific name for sun dogs
- Matrox Parhelia, a series of computer graphics processors
