= Low-force helix =

A low-force helix (LFH-60) is a 60-pin electrical connector (four rows of 15 pins) with signals for two digital and analog connectors. Each of the pins is twisted approximately 45 degrees between the tip and the plastic frame which holds the pins in place. Hence "helix" in the name.

The DMS-59 is a derivative of the LFH60.

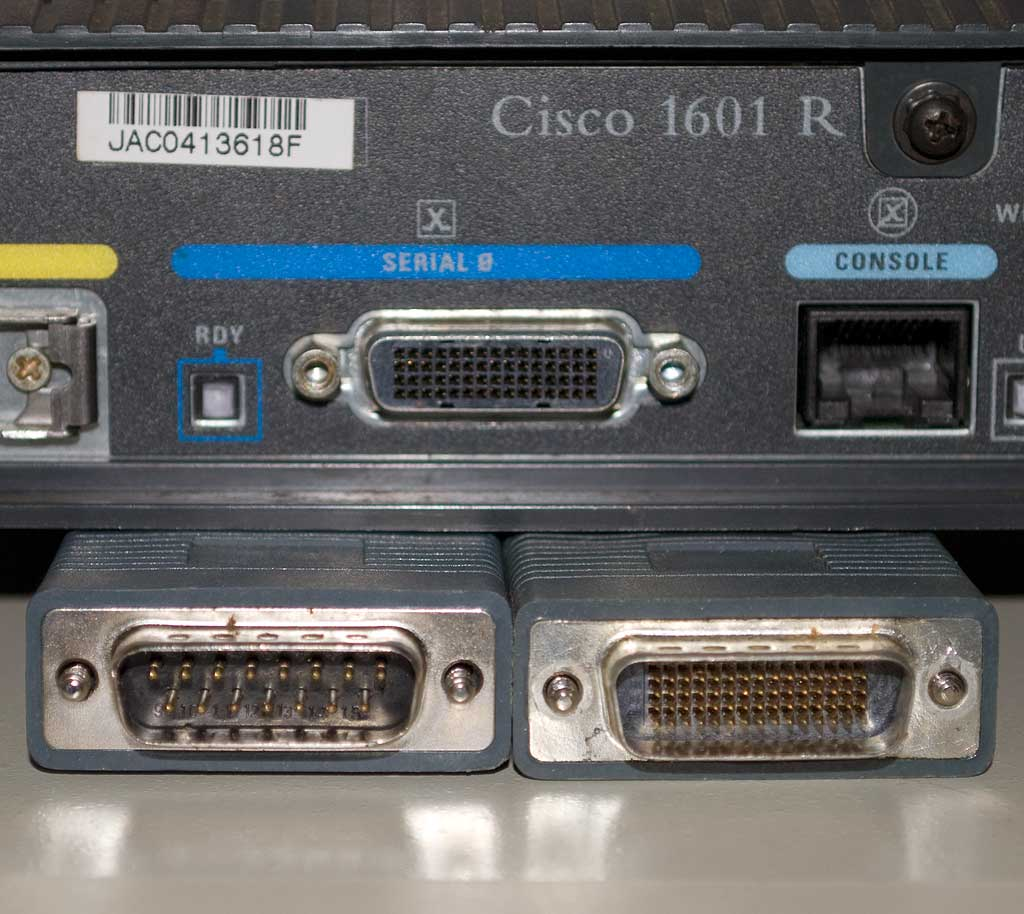
Cisco router serial LFH60 socket and cable LFH60 and DB15 plugs

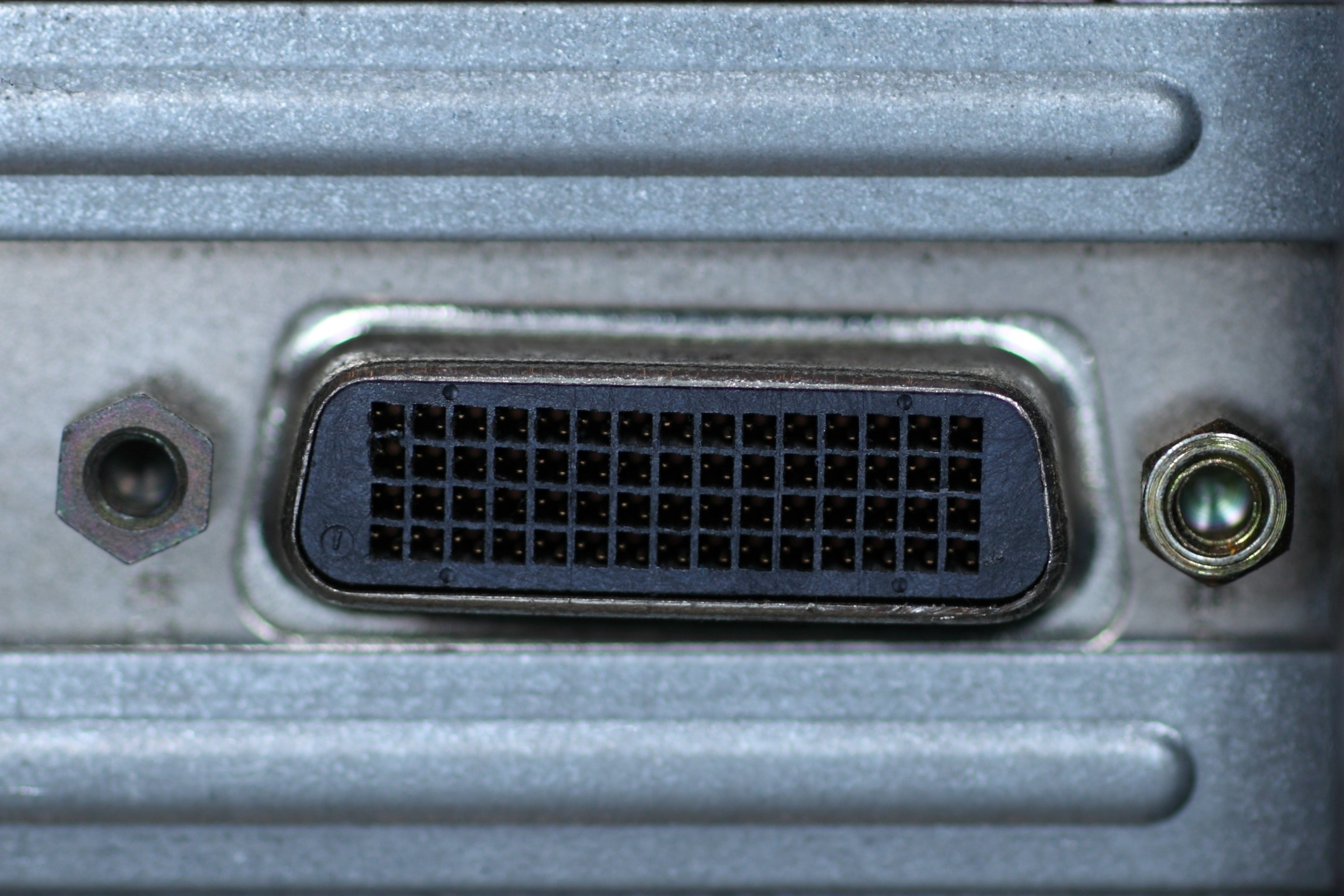
LFH60F connector

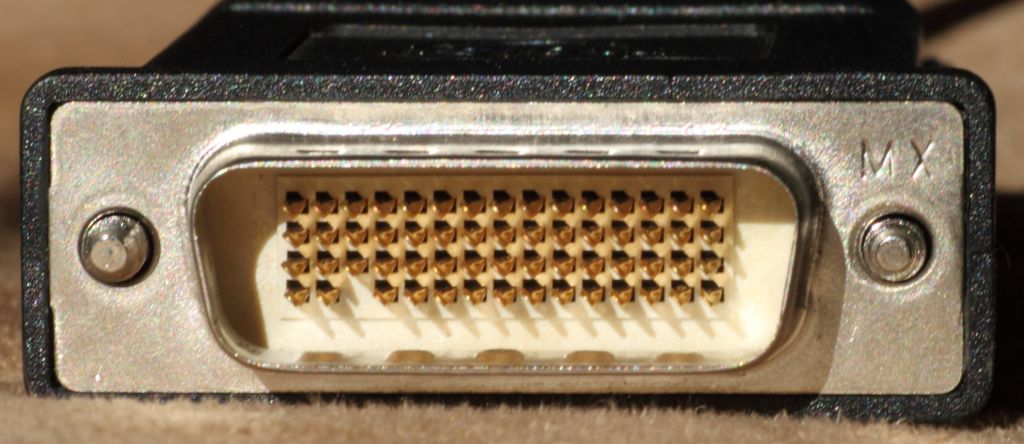
DMS-59 connector (with missing pin 58)

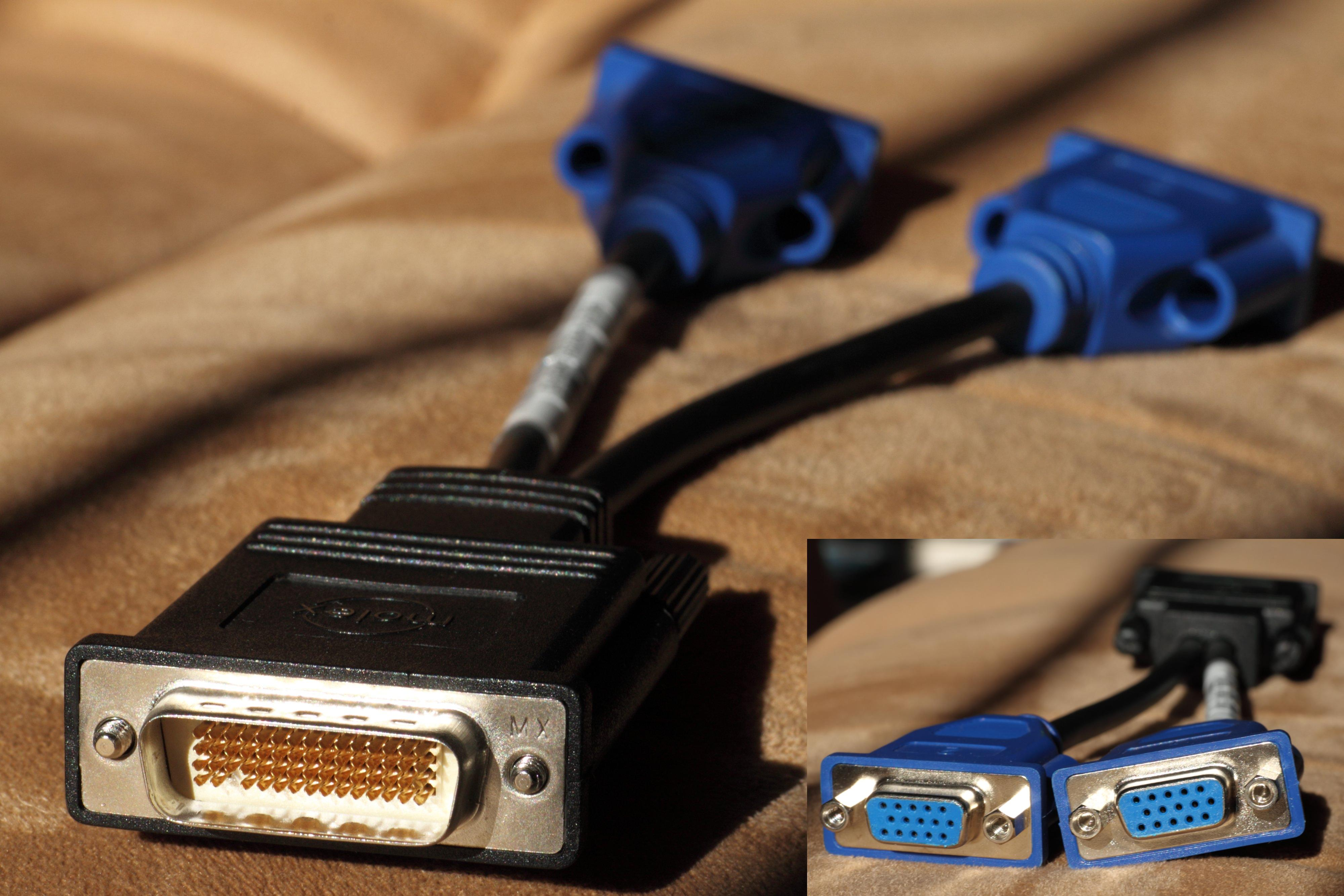
DMS-59 VGA adapter (with missing pin 58)

The LFH connector is typically used with workstations, because it can connect a single computer graphics source to up to four different monitors. The standard interface is a 60-pin LFH connector with two breakout VGA or DVI cables. This system provides users with flexibility for a variety of display configurations, though forsakes standard DVI or VGA connectors. This renders the LFH connector unusable without an adapter.

It's also used in HDCI (High Definition Camera Interface) used in Polycom HDX video conferencing systems.

Using the LFH interface requires a graphics card with multi-monitor capabilities and an LFH port. Nvidia and Matrox used to manufacture such cards.

The LFH connector is used in some Cisco routers and WAN Interface Cards.

== See also ==
- DMS-59
- Molex
- Very-high-density cable interconnect standardized as SCSI interface which is often used to carry four digital/analog monitor signals
