= PDOS =

PDOS is an abbreviation that may refer to:

- PDOS (operating system), a discontinued multiuser multitasking operating system
- Permanent denial-of-service attack, a cyber attack overloading a service so badly that it requires replacement
- Projected density of states, a projection of the number of modes per unit frequency range
