= Sage Computer Technology =

American computer manufacturer

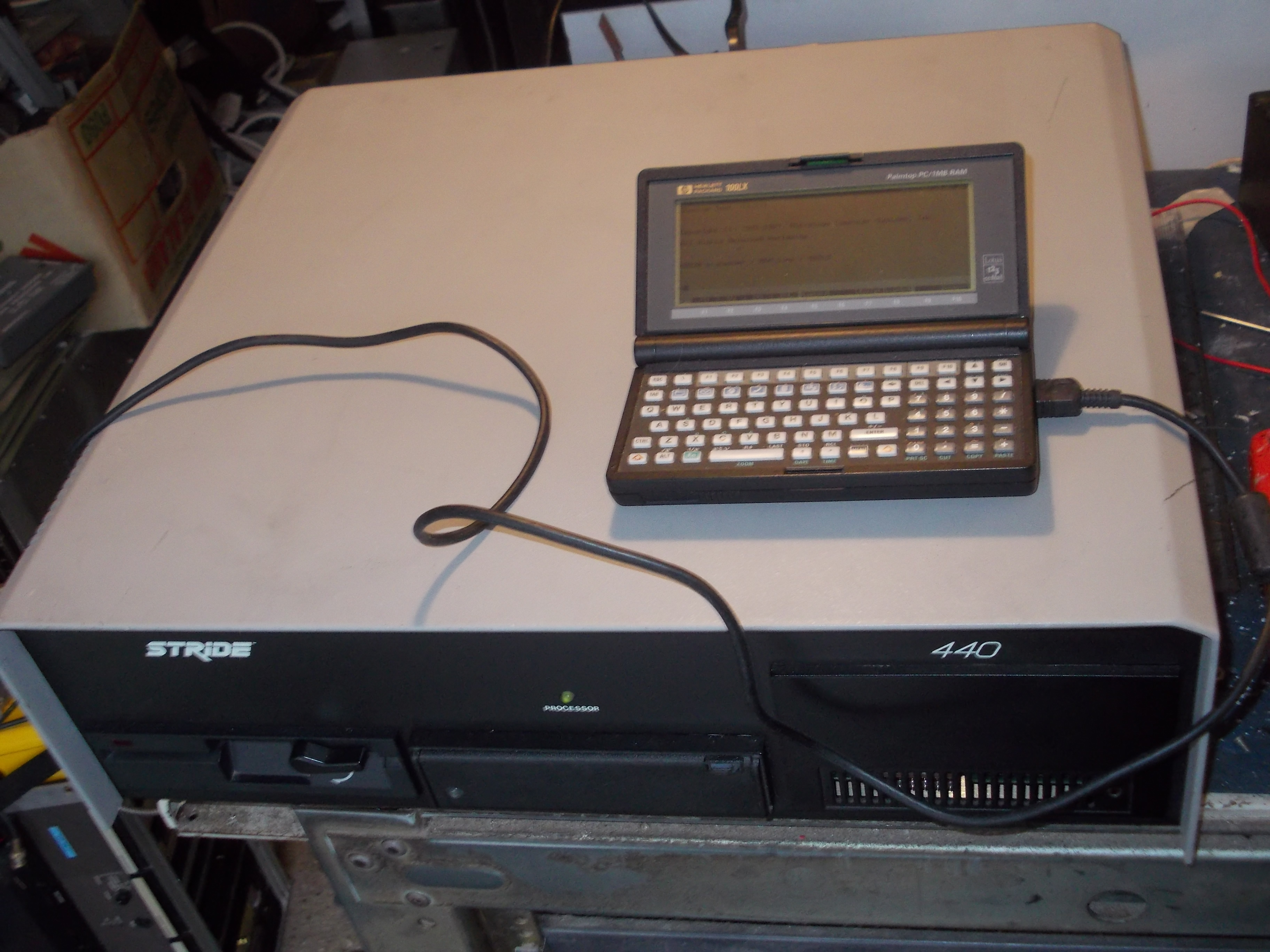
A Sage Stride 440 (with an HP 100LX on top, acting as a console terminal)

SAGE Computer Technology was a computer company based in Reno, Nevada, United States. It was founded in 1981 by Rod Coleman, Bill Bonham and Bob Needham; it went through several name changes. The change from Sage computer came about when "Sage Software" in Maryland demanded cessation of use of the name Sage in the computer segment.

- SAGE Computer Technology

- created the Sage II and Sage IV computers based on the Motorola 68000 microprocessor.

- SAGE Computer
- Stride Micro
  - MicroSage Computer Systems (a wholly owned subsidiary, 1987)

- created the Stride 420, Stride 440, Stride 460 (VME), Stride 660 and Stride 740 computers.

== SAGE II ==
The SAGE II was released in the summer of 1982. Hardware:

- Board0: CPU: MC68000 @ 8 MHz, 2× serial RS-232 ports 19.2 kbit/s, Parallel input/output (PIO) for printers, GPIB, Floppy disc controller, 512 KByte DRAM.
- Minimum system memory is 128 KByte.
- Storage: 1× 5¼" 800 KByte F.D. drive.
- Price: $3,600 USD (for the single-floppy entry-level configuration)

== SAGE IV ==
The SAGE IV was released in 1983. Hardware:

- Board0: Same as in SAGE II.
- Board1: 4× serial RS-232 ports 19.2 kbit/s, Hard disk controller, 512 KByte DRAM.
- Memory consisting of 64 Kbit 150 ns memory modules. Parity error protected setup.
- Minimum system memory is 256 KByte.
- Storage: 1× 5¼" 800 KByte F.D. drive. 1× 5 - 40 MByte Winchester harddisk.
- Built-in multi-user BIOS.
- Introduced in November 1982
- Price: $3,600 USD (for the single-floppy entry-level configuration)

The SAGE managed multitasking with six serial ports in real time with 1 MByte of RAM in 1983. It was used by scientists and engineers for more than ten years when it was popular, "running over 10 years with zero admin, and maybe even zero reboot." "13 times faster than the Apple II" (when introduced).

Sage IV computers were used for the development of the Amiga prototype computer system "Lorraine". The Sage system got the nickname "Agony".

Access was through an 80 × 25 serial video terminal. Graphics capability was possible with the addition of a third-party colour graphics system from Robinson Systems which plugged directly into the Sage 68000 bus and provided output compatible with a range of colour monitors (e.g., Cotron Sword, Electrohome 1301).

The included operating system was the UCSD p-System. Many other operating systems were available including CP/M-68K, Idris, PDOS, HyperFORTH Plus, BOS, TRIPOS, Mirage, and MOSYS. Programming languages available included Pascal, Modula-2, C, FORTRAN77, BASIC, 68000 macro assembler, APL, BCPL, LISP and Forth.

== System bus ==
An "m68k" bus was used up to the Stride series of computers (Sage VI). Later a VME bus was used.

== NOD ==
NOD is a head-motion operated mouse device that Wilbur Harvey and Rod came up with one afternoon in about 1983. It works by putting a special reflective pencil behind your ear and a quadrature detector that tracks its movement. The point was to be able to use the keyboard while you used the mouse cursor. It had an RS-232C interface and cost US$400. Apple Inc. were presented with a prototype but the project it was intended for got canceled.

== See also ==
- History of the Amiga
