= Desktop video =

Pre-digital video editing on personal computers

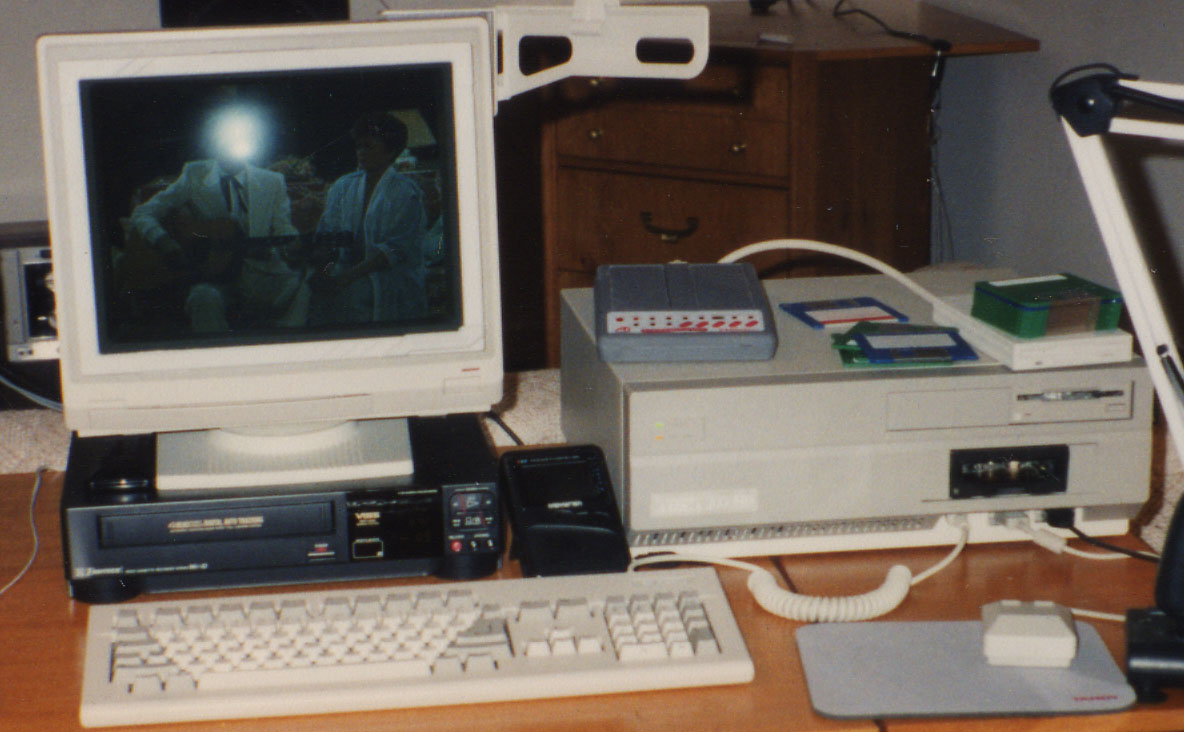
An Amiga 2000 desktop video system. The CPU unit is to the right with the monitor sitting on a VCR.

Desktop video refers to a phenomenon lasting from the mid-1980s to the early 1990s when the graphics capabilities of personal computers such as the Amiga, Macintosh II, and specially-upgraded IBM PC compatibles had advanced to the point where individuals and local broadcasters could use them for analog non-linear editing and vision mixing in video production. Despite the use of computers, desktop video should not be confused with digital video since the video data remained analog, and it uses items like a VCR and a camcorder to record the video. Full-screen, full-motion video's vast storage requirements meant that the promise of digital encoding would not be realized on desktop computers for at least another decade.

== Description ==
There were multiple models of genlock cards available to synchronize the content; the Newtek Video Toaster was commonly used in Amiga in countries that used NTSC (PAL-M in Brazil), while PCs had Truevision and Matrox Illuminator cards and Mac systems had the SuperMac Video Spigot and Radius VideoVision cards. Apple later introduced the Macintosh Quadra 840AV and Centris 660AV systems to specifically address this market.

Desktop video was a parallel development to desktop publishing and enabled many small production houses and local TV stations to produce their own original content for the first time. Along with the advent of public-access cable channels, desktop video meant that television advertising became affordable for local businesses such as retailers, restaurants, real estate agents, contractors and auto dealers. As with the phrase desktop publishing, use of the term died out as the technologies to which it referred became the norm for any kind of video production.
