= HDCI =

Video conferencing connector interface

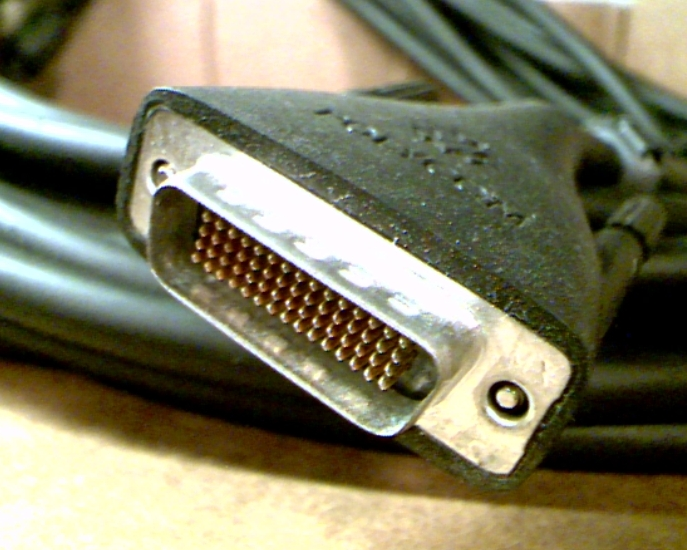

HDCI (High Definition Camera Interface) used in Polycom video conferencing systems. It uses a 60-Pin Low-force helix high-density connector interface.

Provides input for the main camera and second camera. These inputs support multiple formats in a single connector (Composite, S-Video, or analog Component YPbPr) and RS232 Serial PTZ control, using its own protocol (not Sony VISCA Protocol),

== Pinouts ==
 1  RS232 Rx
 2  RS232 Tx
 3  IR
 4  +12 V DC
 5  +12 V DC
 7  Ground - IR RTN
 8  Ground
10  +12 V DC
11  +12 V DC
12  Pb / B Shield
13  Pb / B 
14  Pr / R / C Shield  - CHROMA
15  Pr / R / C ( pg 70 of Integrators's Reference indicates 15 is Shield and 14 is Chroma for SVideo input )
16  Left Mic 
17  Right Mic
18  ARM Mic
19  Center Mic
42  A Ground
43  A Ground
44  Right Mic Shield
45  Left Mic Shield
46  Y / G / C Shield
47  Y / G / C   -  LUMA
48  P Ground
50  H Sync
51  V Sync
52  H / V Shield
58  P Ground

== Cable end size ==
Length to base of interface: 56mm

Length to end of plug: 62mm

Width of plug at base of interface: 41.5mm
