= ACube Systems Srl =

- Company type: Private
- Founded: January 2007; 19 years ago
- Headquarters: Bassano del Grappa, Italy
- Products: Minimig, Sam440ep, Sam460ex, AmigaOne 500
- Website: www.acube-systems.biz

ACube Systems Srl is a company that started in January 2007 from the synergy of the Italian companies Alternative Holding Group Srl, Soft3 and Virtual Works.

== Overview ==
The three companies have been engaged in the areas of sale, distribution and engineering of hardware and software for mainstream systems and alternative platforms for years. They have joined their efforts in the realization of the Sam440ep platform. The ongoing dispute over ownership of AmigaOS cast doubts about the actual release of AmigaOS 4 for this new hardware, support for Sam440ep was later introduced in AmigaOS 4.1.

Since November 2007 Acube Systems distributed AmigaOS 4.0 for Amiga computers with PowerPC CPU cards on behalf of Hyperion Entertainment. They also built the first Amiga redesign in hardware, the Minimig. In September 2011, Acube Systems introduced AmigaOne 500 based on Sam460ex mainboard.
