= RT.X100 =

Real-time PCI video editing card

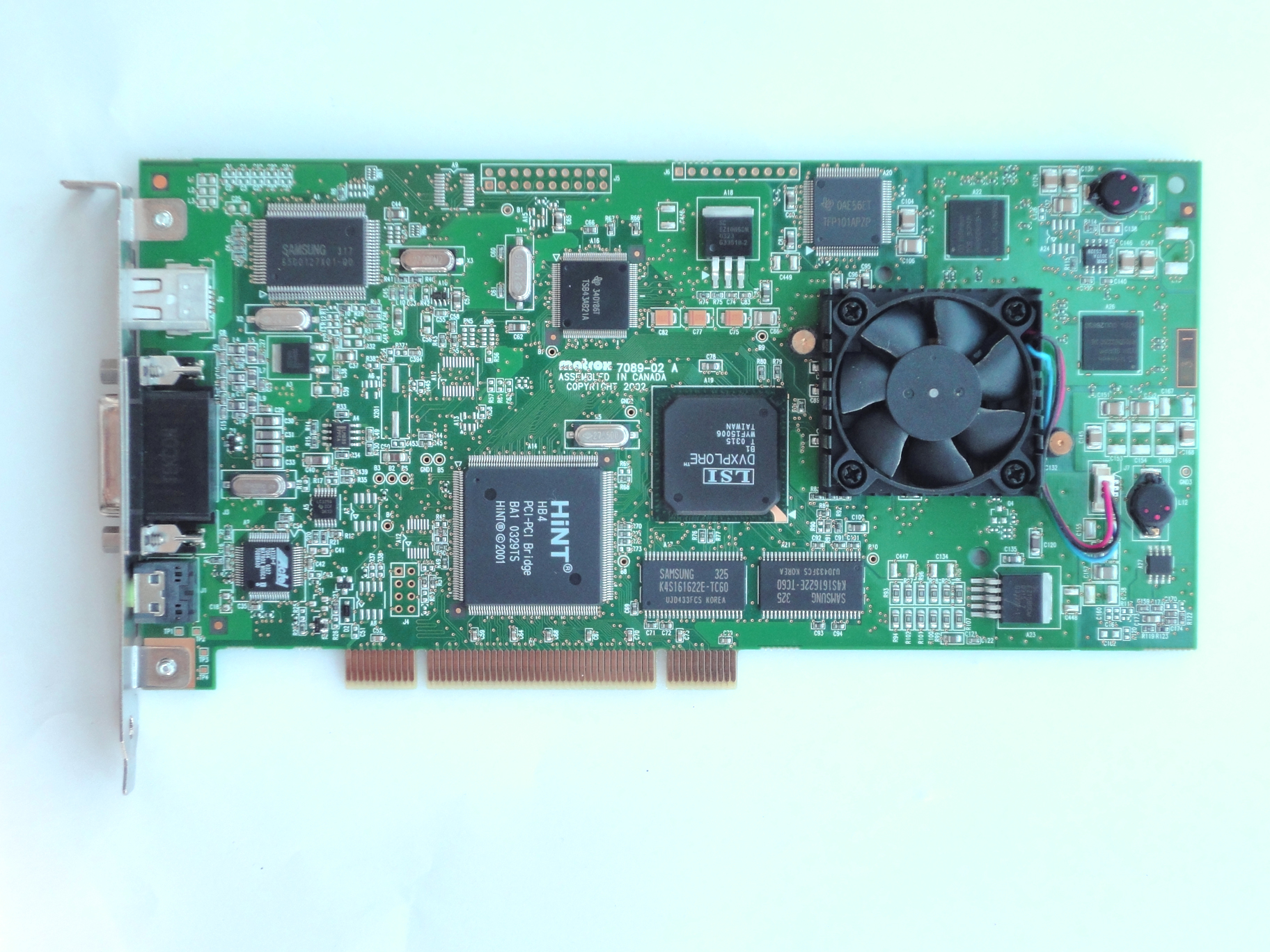
A RT.X100

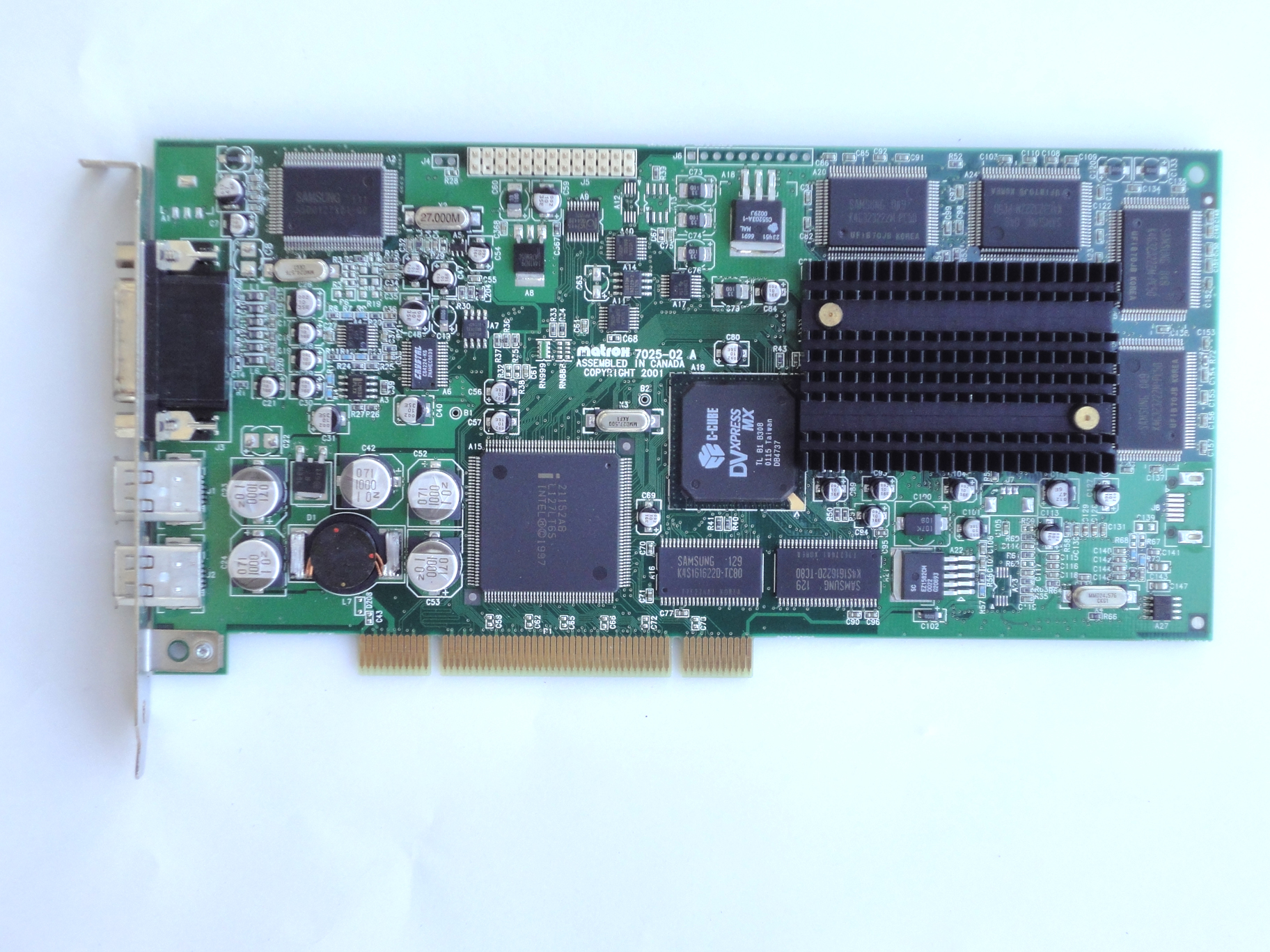
A Matrox RT2500

The RT.X100 was a real-time PCI video editing card manufactured by Matrox Corporation. With the use of Adobe Premiere it enabled a real time preview on TV or video monitor. It was released in 2002 and meant to replace the Matrox RT2500. A second version of the same hardware with updated drivers was released in 2003 as the Matrox RT.X100 Xtreme.

The video card was usually sold bundled with Adobe software. The standard bundle included Adobe Premiere Pro (video editing software), Adobe Audition (digital audio editor), and Adobe Encore DVD (for the creation of DVDs). The RT.X100 Pro Collection additionally included a copy of the special effects software Adobe After Effects.

== See also ==
- AMD FirePro
