= Matrox Graphics eXpansion Modules =

Matrox Graphics eXpansion Modules (GXM) are a line of devices released by Matrox Graphics that support the use of multiple monitors over a single video source by splitting the output of a video source, providing an enlarged workspace or gaming environment. GXM is not a graphics card itself, and in fact requires a fairly powerful graphics card for playing games on multiple monitors.

While most modern graphics cards have support for dual monitors and can expand a desktop across three screens, 3D games were generally limited to a single monitor. The GXM uses the standard Extended Display Identification Data (EDID) structure to communicate its capabilities to the graphics card just as a monitor does. However, the GXM's resolution includes all pixels in the three monitors. If the TripleHead2Go were hooked up to three monitors with 800×600 resolution, the TripleHead2Go would report itself as a single monitor with 2400×600 resolution. The graphics card then sends out a 2400×600 signal which the TripleHead2Go divides and distributes to the appropriate monitors.

== TripleHead2Go ==
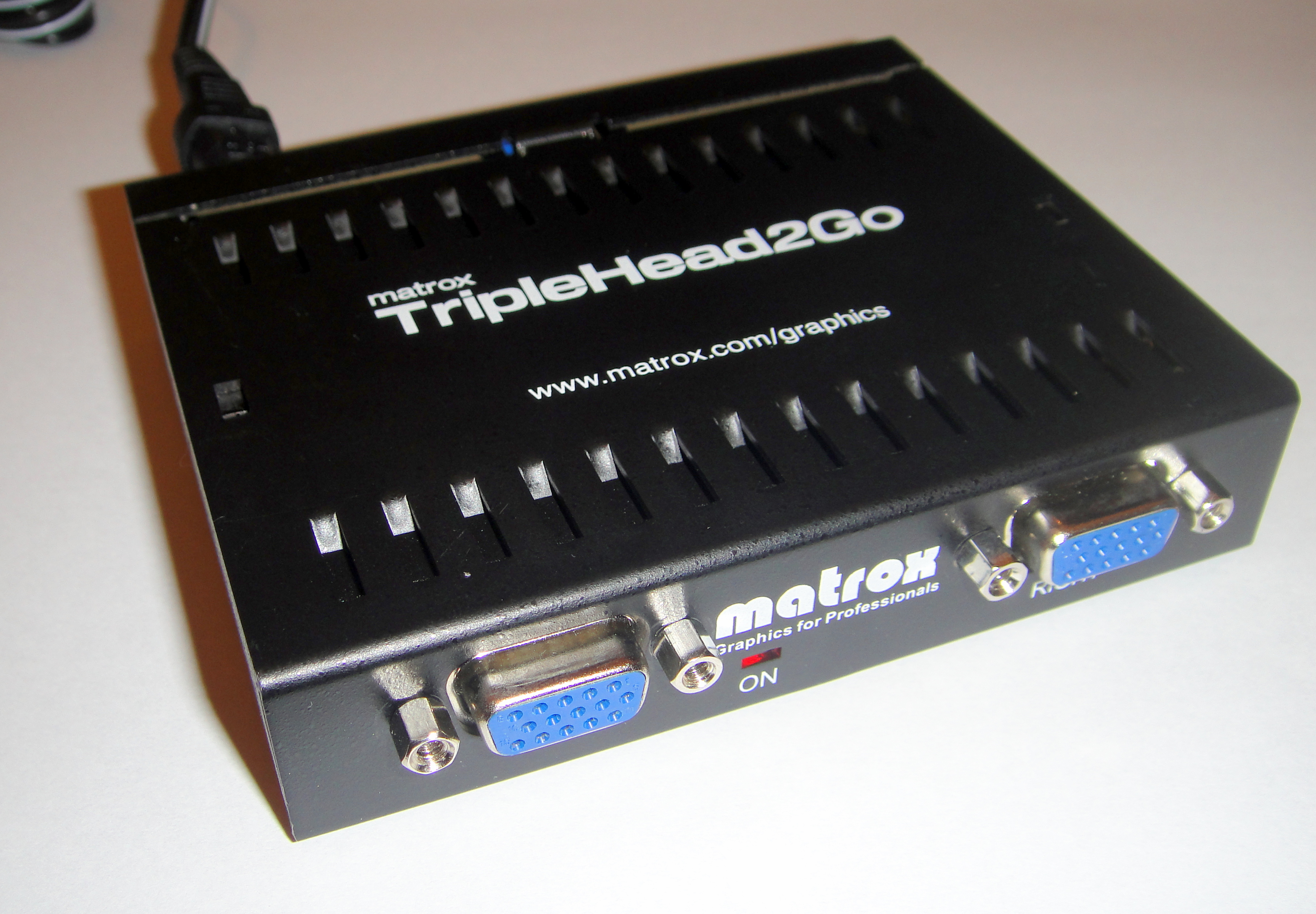
Matrox TripleHead2Go

The TripleHead2Go supports 3 displays at the output, and has maximum resolution of 3840×1024@60 Hz (1280×1024 each). The low 60 Hz refresh rate is used in all except 3072x768 resolution which makes it unsuitable for CRT monitors (however, the severity of flickering perceived by viewers depend on other factors).

== TripleHead2Go Digital Edition ==
The TripleHead2Go Digital Edition supports DVI-I output. The maximum resolution was originally 3840×1024@60 Hz (1280×1024 each), but on August 5, 2008 Matrox announced the support for new widescreen resolution, with a maximum resolution of 5040×1050@57 Hz (1680×1050 each).

== DualHead2Go ==
It is similar to TripleHead2Go, except it supports only 2 displays. When setting output to 1024x768 per display, the refresh rate can be set up to 85 Hz. It has maximum resolution of 2560×1024@60 Hz (1280×1024 each). It was later renamed to DualHead2Go Analog Edition.

== DualHead2Go Digital Edition ==
Compared to original DualHead2Go, this one supports DVI-I output by converting input signal to digital, but it still supports analog output. It has maximum resolution of 3840×1200@60 Hz (1920×1200 each).

== Gaming ==
As of 2006, the Matrox TripleHead2Go was the only consumer level device which allows 3D gaming across three monitors with an expanded field of view (FOV). Very few games directly supported playing at these large resolutions, although many can be tweaked to run on the TripleHead2Go. Matrox maintains a compatibility list of games and provides a Surround Gaming Utility to automatically adjust the game settings to run on three monitors. Some problems remain with distortions to the user interface and geometric distortions at the edges of the display since the games weren't written with such a wide FOV in mind.

In 2009, AMD/ATI released its Radeon HD 5000 series which included an AMD Eyefinity-branded display controllers. These display controllers allow users to use 3 or more monitors on a single video card, using at least one display port on the back of the card.
