= PDOS (operating system) =

PDOS is a discontinued multiuser multitasking operating system, written in assembly language developed in the early 1980s by the Eyring Research Institute for the Texas Instruments TMS9900 processor, and later ported to the Motorola 68000 processor. At the time its speed, accuracy and power made it ideal for process control. It was used in system development for education and industrial uses. Eyring also sold application programs (e.g. a statistics package) for the operating system.
