= Matrox =

Canadian electronics company

Matrox Graphics, Inc.
- Type: Private
- Industry: Computer hardware
- Founded: 1976; 50 years ago
- Founders: Lorne Trottier; Branko Matić
- Headquarters: Dorval, Quebec, Canada
- Products: Video cards, commercial video editing products
- Revenue: $137 million
- Number of employees: 700 (2019)
- Website: www.matrox.com

Matrox Graphics, Inc. is a producer of video card components and equipment for personal computers and workstations. Based in Dorval, Quebec, Canada, it was founded in 1976 by Lorne Trottier and Branko Matić. The name is derived from "Ma" in Matić and "Tro" in Trottier.

== Company ==
- Matrox Graphics, Inc., the entity most recognized by the public which has been making graphics cards since 1978.
  - Matrox Video Products Group, which produces video-editing products for professional video production and broadcast markets. A division of Matrox Graphics, Inc.

== Former divisions ==
- Matrox Electronic Systems Ltd., the former parent company. Sold to Zebra Technologies as part of the divestiture of Matrox Imaging on June 6, 2022 and succeeded by Matrox Graphics, Inc.
  - Matrox Imaging, which produces frame grabbers, smart cameras and image processing/analysis software.
  - Matrox Networks, which produced corporate-grade networking equipment. Date of closure unknown.

== History ==
Matrox's first graphics card product was the ALT-256 for S-100 bus computers, released in 1978. The ALT-256 produced a 256 by 256 pixel monochrome display using an 8 kilobyte (64 kilobit) frame buffer consisting of 16 TMS4027 DRAM chips (4 kilobits each). An expanded version followed, the ALT-512, both available for Intel SBC bus machines as well. Through the 1980s, Matrox's cards followed changes in the hardware side of the market, to Multibus and then the variety of PC standards.

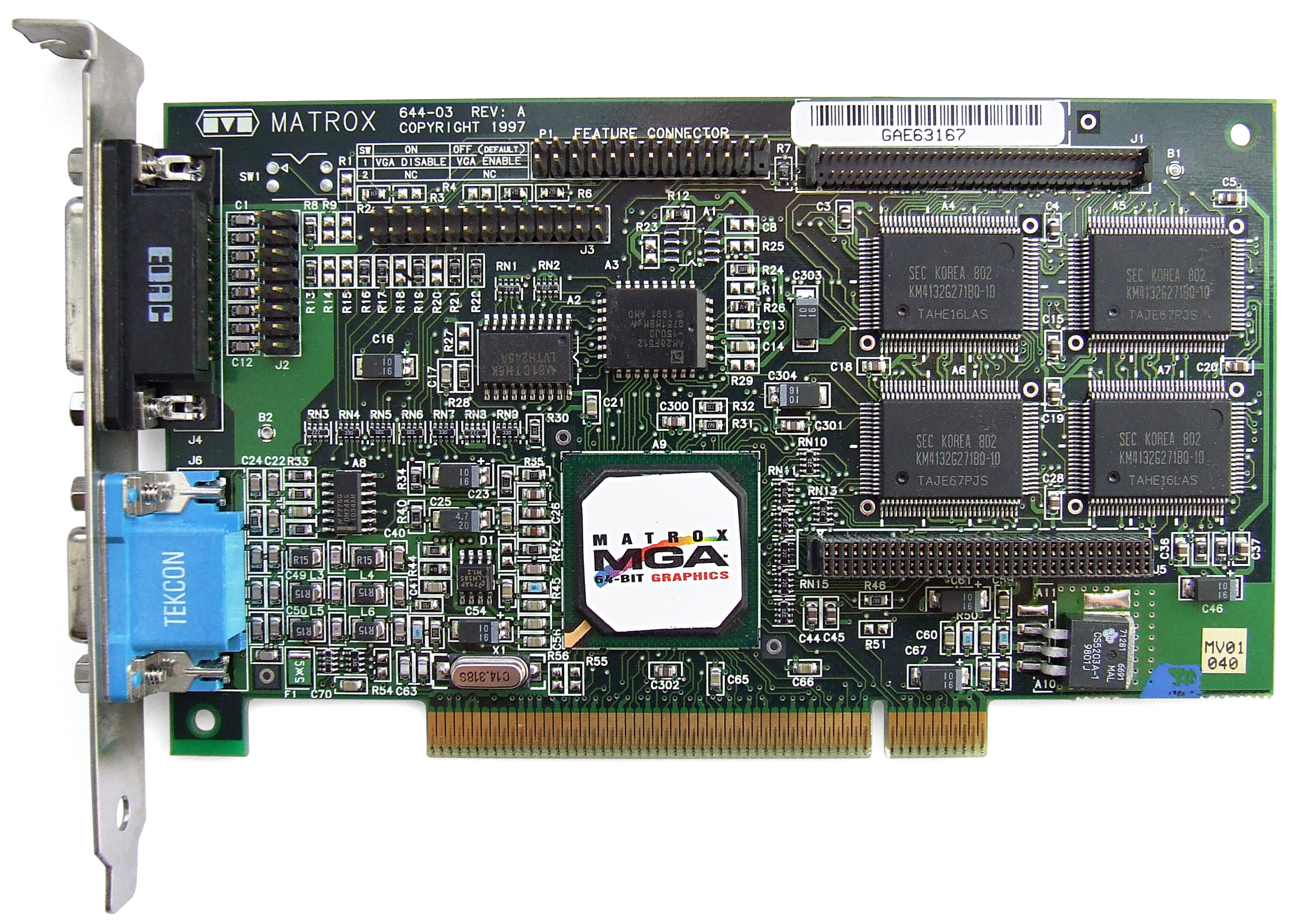
Matrox Mystique 220

During the 1990s, the Matrox Millennium series of cards attracted buyers willing to pay for a higher quality and sharper display. In 1994, Matrox introduced the Matrox Impression, an add-on card that worked in conjunction with a 2d card to provide 3D acceleration. The Impression was aimed primarily at the CAD market. In October of 1995, Matrox released the Millennium, its most venerated 2d card. A later version of the Millennium included features similar to the Impression but by this time the series was lagging behind emerging vendors like 3dfx Interactive.

Matrox made several attempts to increase its share of the market for 3D-capable cards. The Matrox Mystique, released in 1996, was the company's first attempt to make a card with good performance in games and with pricing suitable for that market. The product had good 2D and 3D performance but produced poor 3D images with the result that it was derided in reviews, being compared unfavorably with the Voodoo1 and even being nicknamed the "Matrox Mystake".

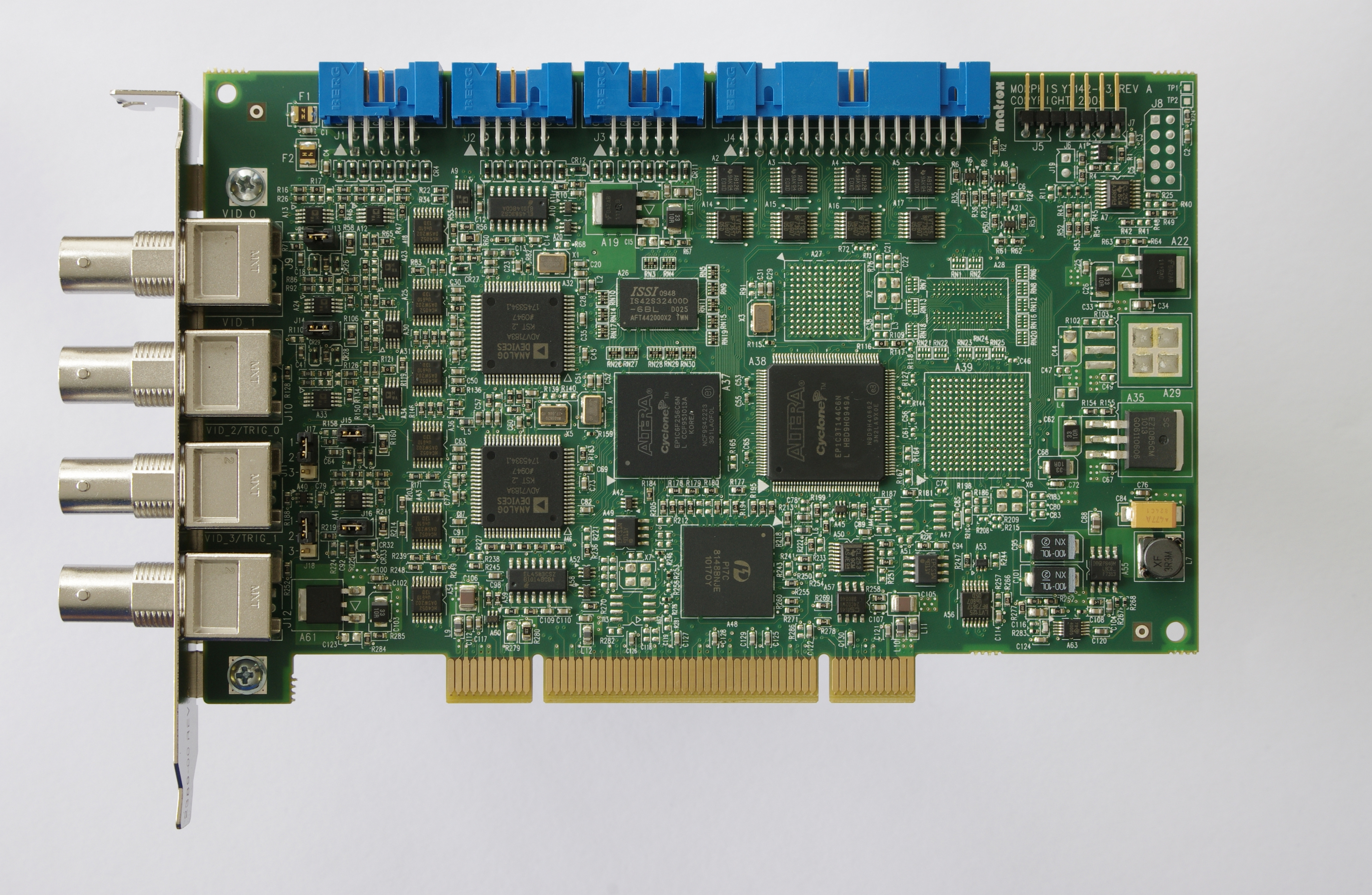
Matrox Morphis frame grabber

Another attempt was the Matrox G100 and G200. The G200 was sold as two models, the Millennium G200 was a higher-end version typically equipped with 8 MB SGRAM memory, while the Mystique G200 used slower SDRAM memory but added a TV-out port. The G200 offered competent 3D performance for the first time, but was released shortly before a new generation of cards from Nvidia and ATI which completely outperformed it. Later versions in the Matrox G400 series were never able to regain the crown, and despite huge claims for the Matrox Parhelia, their performance continued to be quickly outpaced by the major players.

Since then, Matrox has continued to shift the focus of its card designs towards specialized niche markets, moving more deeply into enterprise, industrial, and government applications. This includes solutions for when a large number of monitors attached to the same PC is required. In recent years it has held no more than a 3–5% share of the total video card market. Matrox is now divided into three divisions: Matrox Graphics, Matrox Video, and Matrox Imaging. Matrox Graphics is the primary consumer and end-user brand, while Matrox Video markets digital video editing solutions, and Matrox Imaging sells high-end video capture systems and "smart cameras", video cameras with a built-in computer for machine vision applications.

2016, Matrox introduced the C-series of graphics cards based on GPUs from AMD. Cards are C420 LP, C680 and C900.

On September 6, 2019, the company announced that its co-founder Lorne Trottier had acquired 100% ownership of the Matrox group of companies, including its three divisions—Matrox Imaging, Matrox Graphics, and Matrox Video.

On June 6, 2022, Zebra Technologies announced it had completed its acquisition of the Matrox Imaging division.

2023 Matrox introduced the LUMA series of graphics cards based on Intel Arc GPUs from Intel.

== Driver support ==
To support Unix and Linux, Matrox has released only binary drivers for most of its product line and one partially free and open-source driver for the G550 card which comes with a binary blob to enable some additional functionality. These drivers were tested and are allegedly supported for quite old distributions. They do not work on newer Linux kernels and X.Org Server versions. In addition to the proprietary drivers provided by Matrox, the DRI community has provided drivers under the GPL license for many more of the devices.

== See also ==
- Computer graphics
- Graphics chip
- Graphics processing unit
- Matrox RT.X100
- Matrox Graphics eXpansion Modules
- Timeline of early 3D computer graphics hardware

Similar companies

- Nvidia
- ATI Technologies
- SiS
