= G-Police =

1997 video game

- Developer: Psygnosis
- Publisher: Psygnosis
- Producer: Graham Davis
- Programmer: Neil Duffield
- Artist: Trevor Slater
- Composer: Stuart Duffield
- Platforms: PlayStation, Microsoft Windows
- Release: PlayStation: NA: 15 October 1997; EU: 24 October 1997; Microsoft Windows: NA: 18 November 1997; EU: 1997
- Genre: Combat flight simulation
- Mode: Single-player

G-Police is a 1997 combat flight simulation video game developed and published by Psygnosis for PlayStation and Microsoft Windows.

G-Police has a science fiction setting inspired by Blade Runner. The game is set in 2097, on the colonised moon of Jupiter, Callisto. The player character, Slater, joins the titular G-Police in an effort to uncover the truth behind the death of his sister. Slater and the G-Police work to combat organised crime before eventually becoming embroiled in an unfolding conspiracy that brings Slater and the G-Police into open conflict with the private armies of powerful corporations. The gameplay involves piloting VTOL aircraft resembling helicopters, engaging in combat with enemies and protecting allies.

The game made use of cutting-edge technology such as force-feedback joysticks and controllers, 3D sound and Direct3D Hardware Acceleration. Critics noted that the game's graphics were some of the most technically impressive of the time, and that this resulted in poor draw distance; the PlayStation version in particular struggled in this respect. The gameplay was more favourably reviewed, with critics praising the solid pacing and variety of mission objectives, though there were complaints regarding poor controls and unfairly high difficulty.

== Gameplay ==
The game is based around piloting aircraft and shooting enemies.

G-Police is a combat flight simulator game in which the player pilots a VTOL aircraft, described by critics as "jet helicopters" or "a helicopter without the rotors". The player can choose to view the action from a variety of first- or third-person perspectives, including views from within the cockpit, a variety of "chase" perspectives, including directly from above the craft (for use when bombing). Combat in G-Police involves both dogfighting with other aircraft and dropping bombs. The player is often required to "scan" suspect vehicles to determine if they are criminal or hostile.

The game's aircraft comes with numerous weapons which are upgraded as the player progresses to more difficult levels. An improved version of the basic "Havoc Gunship" aircraft (the "Venom Gunship") is also available later in the game. Missions include seeking out and destroying enemies, escorting friendly ground units, preventing smuggling and bomb disposal. The player receives updates and new instructions as the mission proceeds. The main game mode features 35 missions and an additional training mode. Most of the game's missions take place in urban "domes" filled with large buildings; some, however, take place in the "outer domes", with other themes such as agrarian settings.

== Synopsis ==
=== Setting ===
G-Police is set during the year 2097 in a dystopian science fiction future. The depletion of Earth's resources in 2057 results in increased efforts towards space exploration. By 2077 the various nations of Earth had begun to lay claim to resources throughout the solar system. Disputes over these ever-declining resources escalated into a catastrophic war that ended with the governments of Earth being stripped of all military power in 2087. Powerful corporations stepped into the resulting power vacuum and began to exert their control over Earth and the burgeoning space colonies. The Government Police (G-Police) were formed by Earth's remaining coalition government to maintain order in these colonies.

The main protagonist is Slater, a war veteran who has joined the G-Police to conduct his own investigation into his sister Elaine's apparent suicide, suspecting that she was instead murdered. Slater describes the G-Police as lacking in authority and accuses them of turning a blind eye to corporate crime even while attempting to maintain order. He describes the Havoc gunships as outdated and the pilots as a mixture of desperate war veterans and naïve idealists.

=== Plot ===
The action takes place in a futuristic urban setting, occasionally illustrated by cut-scenes.

After joining the G-Police, Slater is tasked with combating gang warfare. The G-Police suspect the Krakov corporation is supplying the gangs with weaponry. This is thrown into doubt, however, when Krakov's president is subject to an assassination attempt by the gangs. During this attempt, Hiroshi Tachikawa—a pilot whom Slater describes as flying his gunship "like he was born in it"—dies when his gunship crashes after mysteriously malfunctioning. In the interests of morale, the nature of his death is covered up; Slater notes this incident is reminiscent of Elaine's death.

After numerous assaults on its personnel and property, Krakov blames rival corporation Nanosoft and begins openly attacking them with its private army. Lacking evidence for Nanosoft's involvement with the gangs, the G-Police protect the corporation, ultimately destroying Krakov's military power. In the aftermath, the G-Police begin to investigate the reasons for Krakov and Nanosoft's conflict. The investigation triggers an attack by Nanosoft's own private military forces seeking to end the investigation and eliminate any loose ends associated with the G-Police.

In the unfolding plot, Slater learns that Tachikawa and Elaine's gunships were sabotaged so that Nanosoft could procure microchips implanted in the pilots' brains. With the ability to record a pilot's knowledge and combat skills, Nanosoft planned to use the chips to power their artificial intelligence equipped weapons. An additional microchip is retrieved by Nanosoft when Slater's wingmate, Ricardo kills the G-Police commander Horton. It is further revealed that Ricardo had introduced the virus that resulted in the deaths of Tachikawa and Elaine. Nanosoft's plans are eventually thwarted when Slater destroys a large spacecraft that the corporation had planned to use to exert military dominance over other corporations.

== Development ==
According to Ian Hetherington, the co-founder of Psygnosis, G-Police was developed by one of company's "microstudios" in Stroud. This studio consisted of around 70 people and was also responsible for developing Overboard! at the same time.

G-Police was backed by a reported $2.5 million advertising campaign, part of a wider $6 million campaign which also included Formula 1 Championship Edition and Colony Wars. According to Psygnosis product marketing manager Mark Day, G-Police and Colony Wars were "neck and neck" as far as getting the biggest financial push from the company. They partnered with the Diesel clothing company—added to the game as an evil corporation whose logo could be blown up—who designed the police's uniform and produced their jacket as a limited edition piece.

A television advertisement was created to publicise the game, based around an animated sequence by Peter Chung, creator of Æon Flux. The original sequence was 21 seconds long, but was shortened to allow gameplay footage to appear in the advertisement. The animation was "done entirely using traditional hand-drawn methods", according to its creator. Regarding its development, Chung also stated:

I was at first daunted by the prospect of animating mechanical vehicles by hand that would hold up beside their computer-generated versions. I decided to concentrate on the people inside the machines, emphasizing their emotions and expressions. Also, the computer imagery was very atmospheric, with lots of lighting effects. I used multiple layers of glows, highlights, and shadows to get the drawn artwork to match the atmosphere of the game footage.

Chung claimed that the decision to "concentrate on the people inside the machines" was informed by his belief that the game's plot, setting and characters set G-Police apart from other shooters of the day.

== Reception ==
Reception

Review scores
Publication	Score
Edge	8/10 (PS, PC)
Electronic Gaming Monthly	9/10, 8.5/10, 8/10, 8/10 (PS)
GameSpot	6.2/10 (PS); 5.9/10 (PC)
IGN	8/10 (PS)
Next Generation	4/5 (PC)
Playstation Plus	91% (PS)

Upon its original release for the PlayStation, critics were impressed by the full motion video cutscenes in G-Police. and elaborate cityscapes, but were derisive of the low draw distance. GamePro described it as "one of the worst cases of draw-in since 32-bit gaming began", reckoning that "About a third of the screen remains black while buildings and enemies wink into existence." However, while GamePro judged this a crippling flaw, most critics assessed that the game is exemplary in spite of it. IGN said the graphics are the "low point of the game", which was redeemed by solid gameplay and attention to detail. IGN, Edge, and Shawn Smith and Crispin Boyer of Electronic Gaming Monthly all argued that the low draw distance was an easily forgivable shortcoming given the limitations of the PlayStation. Edge praised the large city environments, flight simulation (noting the support for analog joypads), "marvellous" cut scenes and "great variety and imagination" of the playable missions.

The controls were a point of disagreement. GameSpot, GamePro, and Dan Hsu and Crispin Boyer of EGM all said that the game controls poorly whether using analog or digital controllers. Hsu elaborated, "Analog is too sensitive; digital is too clunky. Poor control+speedy gameplay+lots of buildings=a disaster (and one slightly frustrated reviewer). But it's no big deal; I still recommend it highly." GameSpot's Joe Fielder was less forgiving, saying the control issues "prevent [G-Police] from having speedy arcade-style play or, in effect, acting as a compelling action title." On the contrary, Hsu's co-reviewer Kelly Rickards and IGN both contended that the initially difficult controls become natural with practice. While Fielder derided the missions as being repetitive, most critics praised their broad variety of objectives and exciting pace.

Both Edge and its American sister magazine Next Generation wrote that the PlayStation version's problems with draw distance and frame rate were solved in the PC version, albeit only when using high-end hardware. Next Generation praised the game's support of recent technical innovations, particularly force–feedback joysticks, 3D sound, and Direct3D Hardware Acceleration. The magazine also praised the graphics (again noting the scifi influence), responsive controls and enjoyable gameplay, but the reviewer complained that the game became overly difficult after the first few missions and that the verbal instructions were easily missed. Edge called it "a meeting of envelope-pushing code and solid gameplay". Mark East argued in GameSpot that while the PC version of G-Police is "quite possibly the best looking game to hit the scene since the advent of 3D-accelerator cards", the unintuitive controls, "downright ludicrous" level of difficulty, and the fact that those who cannot afford a high-end PC setup cannot even enjoy the game's visual merits make it not worth buying.

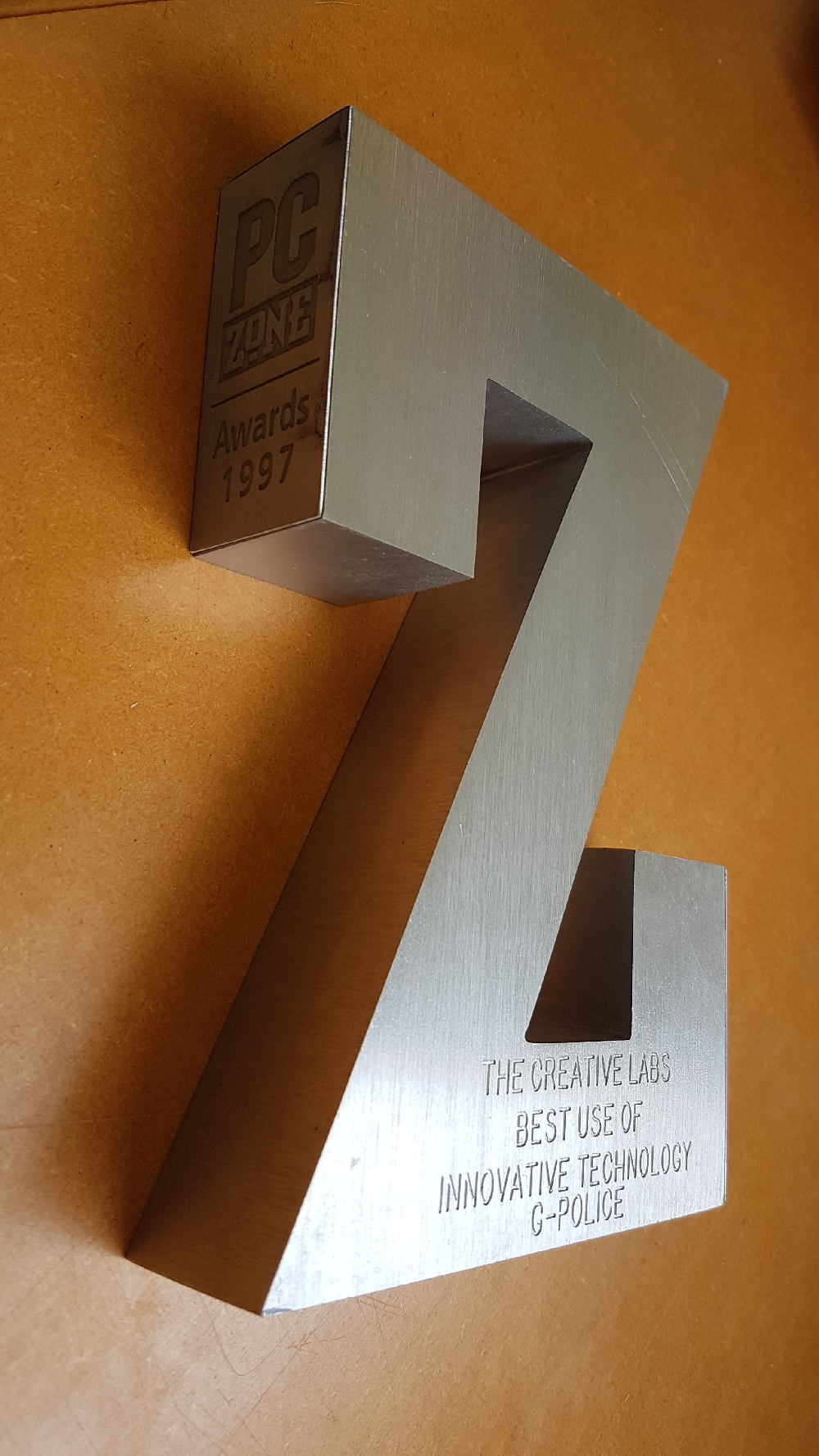
Picture of the PC Zone - The Creative Labs Best Use of Innovative Technology award won by G-Police in 1997

== Awards ==
G-Police won PC Zone's 1997 "The Creative Labs Best Use of Innovative Technology" award, awarded at the PC Zone Reader Awards night, held on 4 December 1997 at the Camden Palace, London.

G-Police was a runner-up for Computer Gaming World's 1997 "Action Game of the Year" award, which ultimately went to Quake II. The editors called G-Police "the most beautiful" action nominee that year, but wrote that it lost its chance due to the lack of multiplayer gameplay.

== Sequel ==
G-Police: Weapons of Justice is the sequel to G-Police, released in 1999 for the PlayStation. The game depicts the aftermath of the conflict between the G-Police and Nanosoft, which involves initial battles with gangs attempting to take advantage of the colony's instability. Later, another war arises between the G-Police and a power hungry leader of Earth's forces, originally sent to assist the G-Police against the gangs. The game features additional vehicles: a VTOL spacecraft, an armoured personnel carrier and the "Raptor"—a mech with the ability to leap airborne. The game received similar reviews to the original game: IGN praised its well-crafted gameplay, story and sound, while GameSpot considered the controls awkward and the missions and setting repetitive. The graphics again received a mixed reception: IGN praised the attention to detail but criticised the poor draw distance, as did GameSpot.

In 2001, a rumoured sequel for the PlayStation 2 was reported. The rumours later proved false. While Sony contemplated the notion of a G-Police game for the PlayStation 2, they decided that, because G-Police was not as successful as other games, Psygnosis (which had since been renamed Studio Liverpool) would instead concentrate on the Formula 1 and Wipeout franchises. Furthermore, the development team responsible for G-Police and Weapons of Justice had moved on to other ventures. In 2007, G-Police was made available for download on PlayStation 3. Computer and Video Games noted that the graphics looked poor by current standards but deemed it still enjoyable to play.
