= Novastorm =

1994 video game

- Sega CD cover art
- Developer: Psygnosis
- Publisher: Psygnosis: JP: Fujitsu (FM Towns)
- Platforms: FM Towns, FM Towns Marty, 3DO, Sega CD, PlayStation, MS-DOS
- Release: FM Towns: JP: November 1993; 3DO: JP: 7 October 1994; NA: 1994; Sega CD: EU: November 1994; NA: 1995; PlayStation: EU: 29 September 1995; NA: 2 November 1995; JP: 1 March 1996; MS-DOS: NA: 1995
- Genre: Action
- Mode: Single-player

Novastorm, also known as Scavenger 4 in Japan, is a rail shooter video game developed by Psygnosis and published by Fujitsu for the FM Towns in 1993. It was later released for to 3DO and Sega CD in 1994, then the PlayStation and MS-DOS in 1995.

== Plot ==
The game takes place some time in the distant future. Humans have left earth in several huge arks containing Earth's ecosystem, in search of a new paradise. They have become complacent: everything is controlled by artificial intelligence, while the human race sleeps and dreams of its new home. The computer systems evolve, however, and prophesy of a conquest of silicon against flesh.

The player takes control of the Scavenger 4 squadron, which has a mission to destroy the deadly Scarab-X forces, in the last hope for the human race.

== Gameplay ==
The gameplay is similar to many contemporaneous full-motion video games. The player controls of the Scavenger 4 spacecraft through 4 different environments. Each level ends with a boss fight, which the player must complete to proceed.

During the course of each level, the player gets attacked by groups (of about 2–5) of a particular enemy. Taking out every enemy in a particular group produces a token of bronze, silver or gold. These tokens are used like credits to obtain power-ups; upon picking one up, the power-up bar at the bottom of the screen moves along by differing amounts depending on the colour of the token. The power-ups are of increasing value to the player as the bar progresses. Pressing the select button gives the player the currently available power-up, and returns the bar to the bottom.

== Version differences ==
The version released for the Sega CD has the addition of some 2D sprite mid-level enemies.

The PlayStation version is the only version of the game with full-screen FMV. It has a redesigned, minimalist HUD.

The 1994 MS-DOS version U.S. has the original version of the soundtrack by Rik Ede with enhancements to the sound effects and voices. The rendering and level layouts are also significantly different from the console versions. Although only on one disc and the FMV is not full-screen, the video encoding and quality are comparable to the 2-disc PlayStation version. A secret level is also accessible by typing TOMATOES at the start of the game. Standard player fire turns to tomatoes and the player is warped to the final stage after the bonus level.

== Reception ==
Reception

Review scores
| Publication | Score |
|---|---|
| AllGame | 3/5 (PS) |
| Computer Gaming World | 2/5 (MS-DOS) |
| Electronic Gaming Monthly | 5/10 (3DO) |
| Next Generation | 1/5 (3DO, PS) |
| CD Player | 6/10 (3DO); 6/10 (MS-DOS); 7/10 (PS1) |

Scary Larry of GamePro gave the Sega CD version a mixed review, saying that the graphics are impressive despite the low resolution and lack of full color, but that the gameplay is overly easy and lacking in intensity, and that the game can easily be finished in a standard two-day rental. He reviewed that the 3DO version suffers the same problem. Electronic Gaming Monthly commented that the FMV is attractive but the gameplay is shallow and unenjoyable. They also criticized the game as being overly similar to Microcosm. A reviewer for Next Generation also found it far too similar to Microcosm, and added that "Microcosm was bad enough, but Novastorm doesn't even have the advantage of a knockout intro ..."

Reviewing the PlayStation version in GamePro, Air Hendrix shared Scary Larry's conclusion that the game has stunning graphics but crude and dull gameplay, though he found it too difficult rather than too easy. He summarized, "Despite the eye-catching fireworks, this game plays like a stale B grade shooter."
