= Terrorpods =

1987 video game

- Box art by Roger Dean
- Developer: Psygnosis
- Publisher: Psygnosis
- Designer: Ian Hetherington
- Programmer: Ian Hetherington
- Artist: Roger Dean
- Platforms: Amiga, Atari ST, Commodore 64, Amstrad CPC, ZX Spectrum, MSX
- Release: 1987
- Genres: Shooting, Business simulation
- Mode: Single-player

Terrorpods is a 1987 shooting game with simple business simulation by Psygnosis. Originally developed for the Amiga and Atari ST, it was later ported to the Commodore 64, ZX Spectrum, Amstrad CPC and MSX.

The game casts the player as an industrial spy in a science fiction future, assigned to halt an evil Empire's production of fearsome war machines called Terrorpods. To win the game, the player must manage colonies with specialised industries to produce a Terrorpod of their own, while fighting off enemy forces like in a traditional shooting game.

The appearance of the Terrorpods was conceived from a rejected design by Psygnosis cover artist Roger Dean for the Martian fighters in Jeff Wayne's Musical Version of The War of the Worlds.

== Gameplay ==
The player views the action in Terrorpods from the cockpit of his DSV (Defence Strategy Vehicle), which consumes fuel as it travels around the game world, a crater on the planet Colian. In the crater are ten mining colonies, which the player must defend and trade minerals with. The enemy forces comprise destructible Terrorpods and Spoilers roaming the world, and an indestructible mothership that hovers overhead and periodically shoots at the player.

The player's prime objective is to use the DSV to trade resources between the ten colonies, building up their mineral resources so they can each build one part of a Terrorpod. There are five minerals: fuel, "detonite", "quanza", "zenite" and "aluma". The former four are used for fuel and weapons, and the latter is required to build Terrorpod parts. Colonies tend to specialize in the production of a single mineral, which the player can buy and then sell for a profit at a colony where that resource is scarce. To contact a colony for trading, the player must dispatch his "trading drover" vehicle or drive there in the DSV. The drover is useful because, unlike the DSV, it does not consume fuel when traveling.

Spoilers steal minerals from the colonies, and can be shot down with a phaser cannon which consumes very little fuel. Terrorpods will attack colonies, and can be briefly repelled with the phaser, but not destroyed. To destroy the Terrorpods, the player must use missiles, which require precious detonite to work. Once the player has taken aim at a Terrorpod, the lines making up the crosshair will shift around for a few seconds, and the player must realign them for a successful hit. The DSV carries enough detonite for about two missiles and then must replenish the supply at a colony. If a colony has been destroyed by a Terrorpod, the player can repair it with their quanza-consuming energy beam.

The game ends when the player has gathered the six required parts to build a Terrorpod.

== Development ==
=== Release ===
Terrorpods was originally released for the Amiga and Atari ST. Included inside the game box was a foldout poster, drawn by Tim White, depicting three Terrorpods excavating minerals on the icy surface of Colian. The game was later released for Commodore 64, ZX Spectrum, Amstrad CPC and MSX. These versions removed all the resource management aspects of the original, turning the game into a straight-up shooter.

== Reception ==
Julie Boswell's Atari ST User review called the game "superb", praising its high fidelity graphics and sound and the tense, strategic gameplay. The only complaint was the relatively high price.

Hosea Battles, Jr. reviewed the game for Computer Gaming World, and stated that "This is definitely one of the best action, strategy, and adventure games ever marketed for the ST, a game that will have players coming back to it time and time again."

A short review in Your Computer gave the game an 80 out of 100 rating, describing it as "a vastly complex and intimidating strategy/shooting game" while praising "the usual excellent graphic designs and packaging by the talented team of Roger Dean and Tim White." The main complaint was complexity, noting "my only real objection is that with over sixteen control keys to learn, you can find yourself blown to pieces as you try to remember what key does what". They conclude, "buy at once".

Not all reviews were positive. Andy Smith's December 1987 review in ACE praised the graphics and sound effects, but concluded that "if you prefer your blasting spiced with the odd alien then Terrorpods could be worth a look; if you prefer your blasting spiced with the odd chance to think then you could well get frustrated and, eventually, bored. It nevertheless got a 752 rating out of 1000.

The game also reviewed poorly on less powerful platforms. Zzap!! had a short capsule review in their December 1987 edition, concluding "the graphics aren't bad and the game is engrossing, but the £25 price take is a little on the steep side." They gave it a 69% rating.
