= O.D.T. (video game) =

1998 video game

- Developer: FDI
- Publishers: Psygnosis; Piko Interactive
- Platforms: PlayStation, Microsoft Windows
- Release: NA: 3 November 1998; EU: 1998
- Genre: Action-adventure
- Mode: Single-player

O.D.T. (O.D.T.: Escape... Or Die Trying in North America) is a 1998 action-adventure video game developed by FDI and published by Psygnosis for PlayStation and Microsoft Windows.

== Plot ==
The player assumes the role of a crew member on an airship charged with delivering a magical pearl to halt an epidemic. The airship is brought down by a horde of mutants who want to acquire the pearl, and crashes into a mysterious tower.

== Characters ==
- Captain Lamat: Protagonist of the story, despite being a non-playable character. Captain of the Nautiflyus, the ship which crash-lands in the forbidden zone.
- Corporal Ike Hawkins: Second in command, with generally balanced abilities.
- Cartographer Julia Chase: Generally balanced abilities, though one of the better magic users.
- Chief Engineer Maxx Havok: High armor and weapon abilities, though a poor magic user.
- Archbishop Solaar: The most powerful magic user, though has weak armour. Accompanied by a bird that occasionally attacks enemies or breakable objects.
- Stowaway Sophia Hawkins: Unlockable character, with generally high and balanced abilities. Ike's sister.
- Karma, the Ex-Deviant: Unlockable character, one of the enemy monsters in the game sympathetic to the heroes. Generally high and balanced abilities.

== Development ==
Jean-Baptiste Bolcato told PSExtreme magazine that the core of the team was carried over from the development of Adidas Power Soccer, also published by Psygnosis for the PlayStation. He cited The Chaos Engine as a direction inspiration on the game, highlighting its "'futur-anterieur' look and feel a la Jules Verne" as distinctive among the more common cyberpunk aesthetic found in games at the time. A Nintendo 64 version was planned and featured in an issue of Nintendo Power, but never released.

== Reception ==
Reception

Aggregate score
Aggregator	Score	
Aggregator	PC	PS
GameRankings	61%	51%

Review scores
Publication	Score	
Publication	PC	PS
AllGame	2.5/5	N/A
Computer Gaming World	2.5/5	N/A
Electronic Gaming Monthly	N/A	3.625/10 (Note: Three critics of Electronic Gaming Monthly gave the PlayStation version each a score of 3.5/10, and the other gave it 4/10.)
EP Daily	N/A	5/10
Game Informer	N/A	5/10
GameRevolution	N/A	C−
GameSpot	4.8/10	5.3/10
IGN	N/A	5.5/10
Next Generation	N/A	1/5
Official U.S. PlayStation Magazine	N/A	1.5/5
PC Gamer (US)	51%	N/A

The game received mixed reviews on both platforms according to the review aggregation website GameRankings. Next Generation said of the PlayStation version, "There are some neat things in the game such as the batwinged familiar that follows the mage around and the spellcasting interface, but in the end this game is a drag." GamePro called the same console version "a very accurate description of the entire product: a poor man's third-person shooter that manages to nail all the drawbacks of the genre's top gun, Tomb Raider, while cleverly missing all of the genre's high points." (Note: GamePro gave the PlayStation version three 2.5/5 scores for graphics, sound, and fun factor, and 2/5 for control.)
