= Psygnosis =

British video game company

Psygnosis Limited
- Logo used from 1993 to 1996, designed by Roger Dean
- Formerly: Psygnosis (1984–1999)
- Type: Subsidiary
- Industry: Video games
- Founded: 1984; 42 years ago
- Founders: Ian Hetherington; David Lawson; Jonathan Ellis
- Defunct: 22 August 2012
- Fate: Merged into SCE Worldwide Studios
- Headquarters: Napier Court, Wavertree Technology Park, Liverpool, England
- Products: Shadow of the Beast; Lemmings; Wipeout; Colony Wars; Formula One
- Parent: Sony Interactive Entertainment (1993–1997); Sony Computer Entertainment (1997–2005); SCE Worldwide Studios (2005–2012)
- Website: worldwidestudios.net/liverpool

Psygnosis Limited (/sɪɡˈnoʊsɪs/; known as SCE Studio Liverpool or simply Studio Liverpool from 1999) was a British video game developer and publisher headquartered at Wavertree Technology Park in Liverpool. Founded in 1984 by Ian Hetherington, Jonathan Ellis, and David Lawson, the company initially became known for well-received games on the Atari ST and Amiga. In 1993, it became a wholly owned subsidiary and first-party developer of Sony Computer Entertainment (SCE) and began developing games for the original PlayStation. It later became a part of SCE Worldwide Studios. The company was the oldest and second largest development house within the company. The company is best known for creating the Wipeout, Formula One and Colony Wars series.

Reports of Studio Liverpool's closure surfaced on 22 August 2012, with Edge quoting staff tweets. Staff members were told the news by Michael Denny, vice president of Sony Worldwide Studios Europe. Sony said that the Liverpool site would remain in operation, as it was still home to many Sony Departments. At the time of its closure, it employed roughly 100 people comprising two development teams. Mick Hocking oversaw Studio Liverpool's operations as its last Group Studio Director, a position he continued to hold within Evolution Studios.

Psygnosis still exists as a legal entity under Sony and continues to make legal filings, but has had no developers since 2012. In December 2021, Sony renewed Psygnosis' logo and trademarks despite not using the Psygnosis branding since 2000, though this is thought to be standard filing practice as trademarks last for a decade in the United States and Sony had previously filed renewal applications in 2011 as well.

== History ==
The Psyclapse name was used on some early releases.

=== Early years ===
Psygnosis was the eventual successor of the defunct 8-bit software house Imagine Software, where Lawson was one of the founders and Hetherington was financial director. Finchspeed, a company created by the directors, attempted to acquire the assets of the failing company but this was unsuccessful and the remains of Imagine, including its much-hyped but never completed "megagames", were sold by the receivers. While the name and trademarks were bought by Ocean Software, Sinclair Research paid a rumoured £100,000 for the rights to Bandersnatch and contracted a new company set up by Hetherington and Lawson, Fire Iron, to produce the game for the Sinclair QL for release in early 1985.

Sinclair withdrew funding from Fire Iron in early 1985, and Psygnosis, which became a limited company under United Kingdom company law in July 1985, revealed its first title Brataccas, which featured many of the concepts originally intended for Bandersnatch, at the 1985 Personal Computer World show in September.

The name of another Imagine Megagame (the proposed but never developed Psyclapse) was later used by Psygnosis as an alternative label for some of its releases, such as Ballistix and Captain Fizz Meets The Blaster-Trons.

The box artwork was very distinctive with a black background and fantasy artwork by Roger Dean bordered in red. This style was maintained for the better part of 10 years. For the next few years, Psygnosis' releases contained increasingly improved graphics, but were marred by similarly difficult gameplay and control methods. The original company headquarters were located at the Port of Liverpool Building at the Pier Head in Liverpool, but soon moved to Century Buildings in Liverpool's Brunswick Business Park, and later moved down the road to South Harrington Building by the docks. In its early years, the company's US operations had its titles distributed by Mindscape, before self-distributing its games in North America, initially located in Addison and later relocated to Cambridge.

Although Psygnosis primarily became a game publisher, some games were developed fully or partly in-house. During the early days, artists were employed full-time at the headquarters, offering third-party developers, who were often just single programmers, a high-quality art resource. This allowed Psygnosis to maintain high graphical standards across the board. The original artists were Garvan Corbett, Jeff Bramfitt, Colin Rushby and Jim Bowers, with Neil Thompson joining a little later.

Obliterator, released in 1988, contained an opening animation by Jim Bowers. This short scene would pave the way for increasingly sophisticated intro animations, starting with 2D hand drawn sequences, and progressing into FMV and 3D rendered movies created with Sculpt 4D on the Amiga. Eventually, Psygnosis would buy Silicon Graphics workstations for the sole purpose of creating these animations.

While many game companies in the mid-to-late 1980s released similar versions of titles for both the Amiga and Atari ST, Psygnosis increasingly developed games that made greater use of the Amiga's hardware capabilities. Shadow of the Beast, released in 1989, became one of the company's most successful titles and was noted for its multi-layered parallax scrolling and music. The game was also used to demonstrate the Amiga's capabilities in computer shops.

More employees were hired. In 1988, John White became the head of software at the studio. In 1989, Nick Burcombe joined the company, elevating to the role as the head of game design. Tim Wright begin working as a freelancer before being a studio sound design head from 1994 to 1998.

Psygnosis consolidated its fame after publishing the DMA Design Lemmings game franchise: debuting in 1991 on the Amiga, Lemmings was ported to a plethora of different computer and video game platforms, generating many sequels and variations of its concept through the years. Also in 1991, the company partnered with Electronic Arts to market its games for Sega Genesis, before self-publishing Sega Genesis games starting in early 1993. Microcosm, a game that appeared on the FM Towns, Amiga CD32, and 3DO furthered the company's reputation for games with excellent graphics.

Psygnosis also created the "Face-Off" games in the Nickelodeon 1992 television game show, Nick Arcade, such as "Post Haste", "Jet Jocks" and "Battle of the Bands".

=== Sale to Sony and expansion ===
In 1993 the company was acquired by Sony Electronic Publishing (which later folded into Sony Computer Entertainment). The acquisition cost Sony £20 million. In preparation for the September 1995 introduction of Sony's PlayStation console in Western markets, Psygnosis started creating games using the PlayStation as primary reference hardware. Among the most famous creations of this period were Wipeout, G-Police, and the Colony Wars series, some of which were ported to PC and to other platforms. The PlayStation marked a turning point in Psygnosis's game design, moving away from the prerendered graphics and limited gameplay that the company had become associated with. This was a successful period for the company; in the 1995–96 financial year, Psygnosis games accounted for 40% of all video games sales in Europe. The company Sony Psygnosis was once renamed to Sony Interactive Europe on August 17, 1995, but did not last long.

The acquisition was rewarding for Sony in another aspect: development kits for PlayStation consoles. As it had previously published PSY-Q development kits for various consoles by SN Systems, Psygnosis arranged for it to create a development system for the PS based on cheap PC hardware. Sony evaluated the system during CES in January 1994 and decided to adopt it.

As Psygnosis expanded after the Sony buyout, another satellite office was opened in Century Building with later offices opening in Stroud, London (started development in 1993, second studio in 1996, evoled into Camden), Chester (started development in 1996), Paris (started development in 1994), Germany, Manchester (started development in 1996), Leeds (started development in 1996) and Foster City in California (as the Customer Support & Marketing with software development done in San Francisco, who started operations in 1997), now the home of Sony Computer Entertainment America. Soon after Sony took over, its offices in the US moved from Cambridge to Foster City in 1995 ahead of the launch of PlayStation. The company headquarters has resided at Wavertree Technology Park since 1995.

The original London studio was started in 1993 and it was headed by a set of developers namely Anthony Taglione (credited as TAG), Stuart Sargassion, Richard Weeks and Peter Marshall, among others. It was known for Bram Stoker's Dracula, Microcosm, MegaMorph, the aborted CD32 version of Novastorm, Hexx: Heresy of the Wizard and Alpha Storm, before evolving into the Camden studio with the development of Blast Radius.

The Stroud studio was opened in November 1993 in order to attract disgruntled MicroProse employees. Staff grew from initially about 50 to about 70 in 1997. Among the titles created at Stroud are Assault Rigs, Overboard!, the PlayStation version of Darkstalkers: The Night Warriors, Nations Fighter Command, and G-Police and its sequel G-Police: Weapons of Justice. The Wheelhouse—its publishing name—was closed in 2000 as part of the Sony Computer Entertainment takeover of Psygnosis. Some members joined Bristol-based Rage Software, but faced a similar demise a number of years later.

The Leeds studio was opened in 1996, and it housed a lot of development staff. Some of the games the Leeds studio worked on were Global Domination, Retro Force, Wip3out, Colony Wars: Red Sun and Lemmings Revolution, before the Leeds studio shuttered in 2001. The Chester operation worked on its only title Sentient, before closing down shortly. The Manchester operation was led by Haydn Dalton, and lasted for a short time between 1996 and 1998 with The Contract being one of the titles they were developing before layoffs hit, with the last game they worked on, Lander, went released.

The Paris operation started developing in 1994 under the pen F.D.I with Adidas Power Soccer, Adidas Power Soccer International 97, The City of Lost Children and O.D.T. being the games developed in the Paris studio before being sold in 1999 to Infogrames. The San Francisco operation started in 1997, and worked on the unreleased titles Godzilla Wars, Galleons Over Mars, Control Freak, Goblins, Real Wars and Reapers, and supported development on Destruction Derby 64, Drakan: Order of the Flame, and Metal Fatigue, before being shut down in 1999.

The PC business was eventually merged with the PC unit of Sony Imagesoft on August 17, 1995 and became Sony Interactive PC Software America, which was operating as a unit of Sony Interactive Entertainment, however the merger was undone in late 1996, with PC titles now being distributed by Sony Interactive Studios America and Psygnosis.

Despite being owned by Sony, Psygnosis retained a degree of independence from its parent company during this period and continued to develop and publish titles for other platforms, including the Sega Saturn and the Nintendo 64. The company hired Perfect Entertainment to port its PlayStation output to the Sega Saturn. This caused friction between Psygnosis and Sony, and in 1996 Sony engaged SBC Warburg's services in finding a buyer for Psygnosis. However, though bids reportedly went as high as $300 million (more than ten times what Sony paid for the company just three years before), after six months Sony rescinded its decision to sell Psygnosis. Relations between the two companies had improved during this time, and Sony became reconciled to Psygnosis releasing games for competing platforms. Shortly after, Psygnosis took over sales, marketing and distribution of its own titles, a task that Sony had been handling following the buyout.

In early 1998, Psygnosis attempted to start a new franchise by releasing a mascot-based title, Rascal, for the PlayStation in hopes of securing a mascot like Crash Bandicoot did for fellow Sony-owned company SCEA, but it failed at sales. In 1998, the company signed a deal with Microsoft for the license to produce PlayStation versions of Windows titles, but the deal apparently fell through. Also that year, the company considered entering a deal with GT Interactive for the North American rights, but the deal fell through. In late 1998, Midway Home Entertainment acquired publishing rights to Wipeout 64, while THQ purchased the publishing rights to Destruction Derby 64.

In 1998, Eidos Interactive purchased most of Psygnosis' European publishing operations, while the American operations were merged into 989 Studios. Sony decided to sell Psygnosis a second time in 1998, and the company offered a deal to sell itself to Eidos Interactive, but the deal collapsed. In January 1999, the company signed a deal with Activision for North American distribution rights of its titles, which came effect on February 1, 1999, and workers moved from Foster City to San Mateo soon afterwards. The studios in Europe had shuttered down around 1998 and 1999, with the exception of the London/Camden studio, and the Leeds studio, which shuttered in 2001, while the San Francisco development division also shuttered in 1999. The France development division was sold by Sony to Infogrames in 1999.

=== Studio Camden ===
Psygnosis had a subsidiary studio at Camden Town which developed Blast Radius, Kingsley's Adventure and Team Buddies. It was moved to Sony as a separate studio after Sony folded Psygnosis, named SCEE Studio Camden and released Dropship: United Peace Force before being merged with Team Soho into London Studio.

=== As Studio Liverpool ===
The SCE Studio Liverpool logo, used from 2001 to 2012

In 1999, a process to consolidate Psygnosis into Sony Computer Entertainment was underway, resulting in the bulk of Psygnosis' sales, marketing and PR staff being made redundant and the development teams reporting directly into Sony Computer Entertainment Europe's president of software development and stopped publishing its PC games. To reflect this, in 2000, the Psygnosis brand was dropped in favour of SCE Studio Liverpool. The company begin early work on PlayStation 2 games under the Psygnosis name, before being finally folded into SCEE. During the year, as its American division was shut down and prepared to merge its publishing operations into Sony Computer Entertainment America, as most of the marketing of Psygnosis' US operations were transferred to SCEA, while focusing on the PS2, while stopping its PC game development and publishing, Take-Two Interactive taking over the rights to Metal Fatigue and the PC version of Rollcage Stage II, Midway Home Entertainment acquired the North American publishing rights of remaining titles of Psygnosis' PlayStation lineup while SCEA published the PS2 titles.

The newly named SCE Studio Liverpool released its first title, Formula One 2001, in 2001. The game was also the studio's first release on the PlayStation 2, and the first entry in the Formula One series after taking over from developer Studio 33. From 2001 to 2007, Studio Liverpool released eight instalments in the series between the PlayStation 2, PlayStation Portable and PlayStation 3. Only two of the games came around North America, with Formula One 2001 being released under SCEA's 989 Sports label due to its qualification of F1 as a sport, and Formula One Championship Edition also coming out in North America. However, Sony Computer Entertainment's exclusive licence with the Formula One Group expired, without renewal, before the 2007 season, marking the end of any further Formula One series instalments from the developer.

Studio Liverpool also developed Wipeout Fusion, the first of two instalments of the series on the PlayStation 2, released in 2002. Next it developed Wipeout Pure for the PlayStation Portable, which launched alongside the handheld in 2005 to significant acclaim, with many media outlets heralding it a return to glory for the series. They followed up with the sequel Wipeout Pulse in 2007 which was later ported to the PlayStation 2 and released in Europe.

In 2002, what was the shell of the former Psygnosis signed a deal with Bam! Entertainment to secure North American rights of two titles from concepts started at Psygnosis, namely Wipeout Fusion and Dropship: United Peace Force.

In 2008 it released Wipeout HD, a downloadable title for the PlayStation 3's PlayStation Network service, consisting of various courses taken from both Wipeout Pure and Wipeout Pulse remade in high definition. An expansion pack for Wipeout HD named Wipeout HD Fury is available at PlayStation Network, including new game modes, new tracks, new music and new ship skins/models. In 2007, a copy of Manhunt 2 was leaked online prior to its release by an employee from the Sony Europe Liverpool office.

On 29 January 2010, Sony made a public statement on its restructuring of Studio Liverpool. The closure of Studio Liverpool was announced on 22 August 2012. In a press release, Sony stated that after an assessment of all European studios, it had decided to close Studio Liverpool. Sony said that the Liverpool site would remain in operation, as it is home to a number of Sony Worldwide Studios and SCEE Departments.

Eurogamer was told by an unnamed source that, at the time of its closure, Studio Liverpool was working on two PlayStation 4 launch titles. One was a Wipeout title described as "dramatically different"; the other was a motion capture-based game along the lines of Tom Clancy's Splinter Cell.

== Spin-off studios ==
In 2013 a number of former Studio Liverpool employees formed two new studios: Firesprite, which worked on the visuals of The Playroom for the PlayStation 4, and Playrise Digital, who had success with its Table Top Racing games. In September 2021, Sony acquired Firesprite.

== XDev ==
XDev, Sony's external development studio, is responsible for managing the development of titles at developers that are outside of Sony's own developer group. It has won 14 British Academy (BAFTA) video game awards and AIAS awards for LittleBigPlanet, 3 BAFTA awards for the Buzz! series and Develop Industry Excellence Awards for MotorStorm and Buzz!.

== Games ==
=== Games developed or published as Psygnosis ===
Year	Name	Platforms
1986	Brataccas	Amiga, Atari ST, Mac
1986	Arena	Amiga, Atari ST, Commodore 64
1986	Deep Space	
1987	Barbarian	Amiga, Amstrad CPC, Atari ST, Commodore 64, MS-DOS, ZX Spectrum
1987	Terrorpods	Amiga, Atari ST, Commodore 64, Amstrad CPC, ZX Spectrum, MSX
1988	Baal	Amiga, Atari ST, Commodore 64, MS-DOS
1988	Captain Fizz Meets The Blaster-Trons	
1988	Chrono Quest	Amiga, Atari ST
1988	Menace	Amiga, Atari ST, Commodore 64, MS-DOS
1988	Obliterator	Amiga, Amstrad CPC, Atari ST, MS-DOS, ZX Spectrum
1989	Ballistix	Acorn Electron, Amiga, Atari ST, BBC Micro, Commodore 64, MS-DOS, TurboGrafx-16
1989	Blood Money	Amiga, Atari ST, Commodore 64, MS-DOS
1989	Nevermind	Amiga
1989	Shadow of the Beast	Amiga, Atari ST, Commodore 64, Genesis/Mega Drive, Turbografx-CD
1990	Anarchy	Amiga, Atari ST
1990	Atomino	Amiga, Atari ST, Commodore 64, MS-DOS
1990	Awesome	Amiga, Atari ST, FM Towns
1990	Carthage	Amiga, Atari ST
1990	Infestation	Amiga, Atari ST, MS-DOS, FM Towns
1990	The Killing Game Show	Amiga, Atari ST, Genesis/Mega Drive
1990	Matrix Marauders	Amiga, Atari ST
1990	Nitro	Amiga, Atari ST
1990	Shadow of the Beast II	Amiga, Atari ST, Genesis/Mega Drive
1990	Stryx	
1991	Amnios	Amiga
1991	Armour-Geddon	Amiga, Atari ST, MS-DOS
1991	Barbarian II	Amiga 500, Atari ST
1991	Christmas Lemmings	
1991	Leander	Amiga, Atari ST, Genesis/Mega Drive
1991	Lemmings	Amiga, Atari ST, MS-DOS, ZX Spectrum, Amiga CDTV, Super NES, Acorn Archimedes, NES, X68000, PC-98, TurboGrafx-CD, Atari Lynx, Master System, Genesis/Mega Drive, Amstrad CPC, SAM Coupé, Commodore 64, CD32, Philips CD-i, Game Gear, Game Boy, 3DO, Windows 95, Macintosh, PlayStation, Game Boy Color, Sony PSP, Sony PS3
1991	Obitus	Amiga, Atari ST, MS-DOS, Super NES
1991	Oh No! More Lemmings	Amiga, MS-DOS, Atari ST, SAM Coupé, Macintosh, Acorn Archimedes
1991	Ork	Amiga, Atari ST
1992	Superhero (Cancelled)	Amiga
1992	Ultraverse: Prime	Sega CD, Super NES (Cancelled)
1992	Agony	Amiga
1992	Air Support	Amiga, Atari ST
1992	Aquaventura	
1992	Bill's Tomato Game	Amiga, Atari ST
1992	The Carl Lewis Challenge	
1992	Cytron	Amiga
1992	Daughter of Serpents	MS-DOS
1992	Red Zone	Amiga
1992	Shadow of the Beast III	Amiga
1993	Bob's Bad Day	Amiga
1993	Bram Stoker's Dracula	NES, Super NES, Game Boy, Game Gear, Master System, Genesis/Mega Drive, Sega CD/Mega-CD, Amiga, MS-DOS
1993	Combat Air Patrol	Amiga, MS-DOS
1993	Creepers	MS-DOS
1993	Global Domination	MS-DOS, Amiga
1993	Globdule	Amiga
1993	Hired Guns	Amiga, MS-DOS
1993	Innocent Until Caught	Amiga, MS-DOS
1993	Last Action Hero	NES, Super NES, Genesis/Mega Drive, Game Boy, Game Gear, Amiga, MS-DOS
1993	Lemmings 2: The Tribes	Amiga, Atari ST, MS-DOS, Genesis/Mega Drive, Super NES, Game Boy, Acorn Archimedes, FM Towns
1993	Microcosm	FM Towns, Sega CD/Mega-CD, 3DO, CD32, MS-DOS
1993	Perihelion: The Prophecy	Amiga
1993	Prime Mover	
1993	Prince of Persia 2: The Shadow and the Flame	MS-DOS, Mac OS, Super NES, FM Towns, Xbox (bonus)
1993	Puggsy	Genesis/Mega Drive, Sega CD/Mega-CD, Amiga
1993	Theatre of Death	
1993	Walker	Amiga
1993	Wiz 'n' Liz: The Frantic Wabbit Wescue	Amiga, Genesis/Mega Drive
1994	3 Ninjas Kick Back	Genesis/Mega Drive
1994	Armour-Geddon 2: Codename Hellfire	Amiga
1994	Benefactor	Amiga, CD32
1994	Brian the Lion	Amiga
1994	Ecstatica	MS-DOS
1994	Hardcore (cancelled)	Amiga, Genesis/Mega Drive
1994	Hexx: Heresy of the Wizard	MS-DOS
1994	Mary Shelley's Frankenstein	Super NES, Genesis/Mega Drive, Sega CD/Mega-CD
1994	Misadventures of Flink	CD32, Genesis/Mega Drive, Sega CD/Mega-CD
1994	Novastorm	PlayStation, MS-DOS, FM Towns, 3DO, Sega CD/Mega-CD
1994	No Escape	Genesis/Mega Drive
1994	Second Samurai	Mega Drive, Amiga
1995	3D Lemmings	MS-DOS, PlayStation, Saturn
1995	3D Lemmings Winterland	MS-DOS
1995	All New World of Lemmings	Amiga, MS-DOS
1995	Blue Ice	Windows
1995	Darker	MS-DOS
1995	Defcon 5	MS-DOS, PlayStation, Saturn, 3DO
1995	Destruction Derby	MS-DOS, PlayStation, Saturn
1995	Diggers 2: Extractors	MS-DOS
1995	Discworld	MS-DOS, Mac OS, PlayStation, Saturn
1995	Guilty	MS-DOS
1995	Pyrotechnica	
1995	Silverload	MS-DOS
1995	Wipeout	PlayStation
1995	X-It	
1996	Adidas Power Soccer	PlayStation
1996	Assault Rigs	PlayStation, Saturn, Windows
1996	Chronicles of the Sword	MS-DOS, PlayStation
1996	Darkstalkers: The Night Warriors	Arcade, PlayStation, PlayStation 2, PlayStation Network
1996	Deadline	MS-DOS
1996	Destruction Derby 2	MS-DOS, Windows, PlayStation
1996	Discworld II: Mortality Bytes!	MS-DOS, Windows, PlayStation, Saturn
1996	Formula 1	PlayStation, Windows
1996	Krazy Ivan	PlayStation, Saturn, Windows
1996	Lemmings Paintball	Windows
1996	Mickey's Wild Adventure	PlayStation
1996	The Adventures of Lomax	PlayStation, Windows
1996	Wipeout: 2097/Wipeout XL	PlayStation
1997	Adidas Power Soccer International 97	PlayStation
1997	Alundra	PlayStation
1997	Colony Wars	PlayStation
1997	Ecstatica II	MS-DOS, Windows
1997	Formula 1 97	PlayStation, Windows
1997	G-Police	PlayStation, Windows
1997	Lifeforce Tenka	PlayStation, Windows
1997	Overboard!	Windows, PlayStation
1997	Professional Underground League of Pain	MS-DOS, PlayStation, Windows
1997	Rosco McQueen Firefighter Extreme	PlayStation
1997	Rush Hour	PlayStation, Windows
1997	Sentient	PlayStation, MS-DOS, Windows
1997	Shadow Master	PlayStation, Windows
1997	Shipwreckers!	Windows, PlayStation
1997	The City of Lost Children	MS-DOS, PlayStation
1997	Thunder Truck Rally	PlayStation, Windows
1998	A Bug's Life	PlayStation, Windows
1998	Adidas Power Soccer 98	PlayStation, Windows
1998	Blast Radius	PlayStation
1998	Colony Wars: Vengeance	PlayStation
1998	Eliminator	PlayStation, Windows
1998	Formula 1 98	PlayStation
1998	O.D.T. – Escape... Or Die Trying	PlayStation, Windows
1998	Psybadek	PlayStation
1998	Rascal	PlayStation
1998	Roll Away	PlayStation, Android
1998	Sentinel Returns	Windows, PlayStation
1998	Spice World	PlayStation
1998	Wipeout 64	Nintendo 64
1998	Zombieville	
1999	3X: The Science of War	
1999	Attack of the Saucerman	PlayStation, Windows
1999	Destruction Derby 64	Nintendo 64
1999	Drakan: Order of the Flame	Windows
1999	Eagle One: Harrier Attack	PlayStation
1999	Expert Pool	Windows
1999	Formula One 99	PlayStation, Windows
1999	G-Police: Weapons of Justice	PlayStation
1999	Kingsley's Adventure	PlayStation
1999	Lander	Windows
1999	Nations: WWII Fighter Command	
1999	Panzer Elite	Windows
1999	Pro 18 World Tour Golf	PlayStation, Windows
1999	Retro Force	PlayStation
1999	Rollcage	PlayStation, Windows
1999	Tellurian Defense	
1999	Wipeout 3	PlayStation
2000	Colony Wars: Red Sun	PlayStation
2000	Destruction Derby Raw	PlayStation
2000	Formula One 2000	PlayStation, Game Boy Color
2000	Lemmings Revolution	Windows
2000	Metal Fatigue	Windows
2000	Muppet Monster Adventure	PlayStation
2000	Muppet RaceMania	PlayStation
2000	Rollcage Stage II	PlayStation, Windows
2000	Team Buddies	PlayStation
2000	Wipeout 3: Special Edition	PlayStation

=== Games developed as SCE Studio Liverpool ===
Game title	Year released	Platform(s)
Formula One 2001	2001	PlayStation 2
Wipeout Fusion	2002	PlayStation 2
Formula One 2002	2002	PlayStation 2
Formula One 2003	2003	PlayStation 2
Formula One 04	2004	PlayStation 2
Wipeout Pure	2005	PlayStation Portable
Formula One 05	2005	PlayStation 2
Formula One 06	2006	PlayStation 2
Formula One 06	2006	PlayStation Portable
Formula One Championship Edition	2006	PlayStation 3
Wipeout Pulse	2007	PlayStation 2
Wipeout Pulse	2007	PlayStation Portable
Wipeout HD	2008	PlayStation 3
Wipeout HD Fury (DLC)	2009	PlayStation 3
Wipeout 2048	2012	PlayStation Vita

== See also ==
- London Studio
- Guerrilla Cambridge
- Evolution Studios
- Bigbig Studios
