= Armour-Geddon =

1991 video game

- Developer: Psygnosis
- Publisher: Psygnosis
- Platforms: Amiga, Atari ST, MS-DOS
- Release: EU/NA: 1991
- Genre: Strategy
- Mode: Single-player

Armour-Geddon is a 3D video game developed and published in 1991 by Psygnosis for Amiga, Atari ST, and MS-DOS.

A sequel was released in Europe in 1994, Armour-Geddon 2: Codename Hellfire, for the Amiga.

== Plot ==
The setting for the game is post-nuclear holocaust Earth, where a privileged group of humans have made it through the war in purpose-built shelters while rest of the humankind suffered. People outside, disapproving how they have been treated, have secretly constructed a laser cannon to even the score.

== Gameplay ==
The player takes the side of the Sheltered ones trying to prevent the outsiders from shooting the cannon. This is possible only by collecting all five pieces of an ancient neutron bomb and dropping it on the hostile beam cannon. In addition to this, the player must defend the base from enemy attacks and gain time by destroying generators powering the beam weapon.

There is a strategic view where player can allocate scientists to develop more effective weapons and engineers to manufacture them. In the 3D vehicle simulation, the player can pilot six different vehicles in the battlefield including heavy and light tanks, hovercraft, helicopters, fighters and bombers.

== Reception ==
Computer Gaming World reviewed the game and stated that "Armour-Geddon does much to recommend itself to anyone looking for a well-balanced sim." 1992 and 1994 surveys of science fiction games in Computer Gaming World gave it two of five stars, writing that "it can be fun, but resembles a Chinese take-out restaurant, i.e. a half-hour later, you are hungry for something with substance".
