= Sentient (video game) =

1997 video game

- European PlayStation box art
- Developer: Psygnosis
- Publisher: Psygnosis
- Platforms: PlayStation, DOS, Windows
- Release: PlayStation: NA: 10 April 1997; EU: July 1997; DOS, Windows: WW: 30 April 1997
- Genre: Adventure
- Mode: Single-player

Sentient is a 1997 first-person adventure game developed and published by Psygnosis for the PlayStation, DOS, and Windows.

== Story ==
There has been a breakout of radiation sickness on Space Station Icarus, and Garritt Sherova has been sent to investigate. After arriving at the station, it becomes apparent that radiation is only one of many problems; the captain is dead and a power struggle has ensued. To make matters worse, Icarus is on a collision course with the Sun and nobody is able to correct the station's course.

Sentient takes place in real-time. The player's actions in the early part of the game determine which path they will travel through later on. Which members of the crew are spoken to and what they are told plays a strong part in the plot's development. The player's performance through the game determines which of the nine endings they receive.

== Development ==
The game was developed by Psygnosis' external Chester Studio and Pompeii Studios over 1995–1997. The characters in the game were based on facial scans of staff at the studio. The Windows version supports 3D acceleration, but only using the Matrox Mystique and the Creative Labs 3D Blaster.

Early in the game's development, Mitch Gitelman of Pompeii Studios stated, "The organic transmission of information was one of our primary design goals, along with logical, nonlinear plot developments. Gossip and information transmission between computer-controlled characters takes the multilayered scenarios down many different avenues. It is our hope that this human interaction system will allow for maximum replayability without compromising the many stories in the game."

== Reception ==
Reception

Review scores
Publication	Score	
Publication	PC	PS
AllGame	N/A	3.5/5
CNET Gamecenter	7/10	7/10
Computer Games Strategy Plus	1.5/5	N/A
Computer Gaming World	1/5	N/A
Edge	N/A	6/10
Electronic Gaming Monthly	N/A	7.375/10
Game Informer	N/A	6.75/10
GameFan	N/A	84% (Note: Three critics of GameFan gave the PlayStation version each a score of 81, 88, and 82.)
GameSpot	5.1/10	7.5/10
IGN	N/A	5/10
Next Generation	2/5	3/5
PlayStation Official Magazine – UK	N/A	7/10
PC Gamer (US)	56%	N/A
PC PowerPlay	68%	N/A

At the time of release, the PlayStation version of Sentient was praised for its ambitious and intricate gameplay and its replay value, but criticised for its sloppy graphics, particularly the odd-looking character faces. Most critics expressed astonishment that the conversation system produces dialogue which is not only fairly complex, but generally sounds natural and realistic. Overall assessments were mostly positive. GameSpot likened Sentient to classic text adventures. GamePro stated that "the intricacy and suspense make the brainwork rewarding (and replayable, too, with six endings)." (Note: GamePro gave the PlayStation version three 4/5 scores for graphics, control, and fun factor, and 3/5 for sound.) Shawn Smith of Electronic Gaming Monthly commented, "Sentient gets some major points for originality. I've never played a game with so many different possibilities." Dan Hsu and Crispin Boyer felt that the pace was too slow and would be unappealing to many gamers, while Ken "Sushi-X" Williams shared Smith's more positive assessment. A Next Generation reviewer concluded, "Ultimately, Sentient succeeds at what it set out to do, which was to forge some new territory in graphic adventures."

The PC release was more negatively received, with critics commenting that the graphics look terrible unless the user has a 3D Blaster or Matrox Mystique card, and that the interface is clumsy and tedious, making the player wade through several menus to choose responses. Next Generation added that the game should have used a text parser for its complex dialogue system. GameSpot expressed admiration for the game's ambition and immersion, but felt the cumbersome interface made it a chore to play. Next Generation similarly concluded, "All in all, the execution makes the whole thing a complete waste of time. It's big, it's ugly, and it's as frustrating as hell to work with. ... Unless you have enough patience to wear down granite, don't bother with this one." The reviewer said that Sentient did not hold up on PC in part because graphic adventures were not as scarce on that platform as they were on the PlayStation.
