= G-Police: Weapons of Justice =

1999 video game

- European box art
- Developer: Psygnosis
- Publishers: EU: Sony Computer Entertainment; NA: Psygnosis
- Producer: Jools Jameson
- Designer: Stuart Wheeler
- Programmer: Gavin Whitlock
- Artist: Robert Osborne
- Composer: Stuart Duffield
- Platform: PlayStation
- Release: UK: 1 September 1999; NA: 24 September 1999
- Genre: Combat flight simulation
- Mode: Single-player

G-Police: Weapons of Justice is a 1999 combat flight simulation video game and sequel to G-Police, developed by Psygnosis for the PlayStation.

== Plot ==
After the corporation wars of the first game, Slater is now a veteran pilot within the G-Police. However, the gangs that lay dormant during the battles between Nanosoft and G-Police have now emerged once again, and the weakened G-Police are struggling to contain them. The United Earth Marine Corps has sent units to assist in enforcing peace upon Callisto, but until they arrive Slater has to do his best to fight the tide. And when the Marines do arrive, the trouble is only just beginning...

After initially aiding the G-Police in their battles against the gangs, the Marines suddenly turn against them. Commander Grice of the Marines, now in control of his own army, attempts to quickly crush the G-Police and take over Callisto, and then move to attack Earth itself. Slater and the G-Police manage to resist and, with the help of Earth-loyal Marine defectors, then beat back his revolution. Grice sabotages the communication devices that allow the colony to communicate with Earth. Grice retreats from Callisto and heads for the safety of space, but Slater leads the assault of a small force of space-capable vessels, Corsairs stolen from the Marine bases, and attempts to destroy Grice's fleet as it retreats. However, despite capturing the Barrosa and using it to cripple the Talavera, G-Police are simply too few to prevent Grice from escaping on his third battleship, the Excelsior. The Marine force continue to head towards Earth - and the G-Police have no way of warning the homeworld in time. Despite the odds, Slater and his crew prepare to follow Grice and hope to delay or outrun him as they both race for Earth.

== Gameplay ==
For the most part, the game handles only slightly differently from the original: the controls have been changed slightly to allow vehicles to strafe and fire two weapons at once, although they can no longer lock on to enemy craft, retreat and bombard them with missiles from afar. Missions are once again linear - they must be completed in a certain order, and key objectives must be achieved or the mission is failed. They are accompanied by secondary missions which are optional.

The greatest change comes in the form of the three new vehicles: as well as the Havoc and Venom gunships, there is the Rhino (an armed car, which was playable in a training level for G-Police but lacked the armament that it boasts in Weapons of Justice), the Raptor (a heavily armed and armoured bipedal tank, capable of jumping and gliding) and the Corsair (a Marine spaceship, used in the final levels to pursue Grice's armada beyond the atmosphere). The mission dictates which vehicle must be used - the player cannot decide for themselves.

The game has 25 weapons, the majority of which are unique to specific vehicles. The vehicles primary cannon can be fired with the Square button and has an infinite amount of ammunition, although they do need to recharge after extended periods of use. The Circle button uses the ships secondary weapons, such as bombs, missiles (both guided and unguided), rockets or an electronic jammer. Throughout the game, the player is often accompanied by a wingman or an armoured ground team. These can be used as a weapon by locking on to targets and pressing the secondary fire button.

The game also has 35 different types of enemy vehicle to engage. They come in different forms, such as SAM systems, corsairs, armoured APCs, droids and large Gunboats. 30 missions are included in the game, all of which must be completed in a linear order. They vary greatly from patrolling the domes of Callisto, protecting important assets, carrying out bombing raids or simply engaging and destroying enemy forces. Weapons of Justice also includes new training and special missions, unrelated to the game's plot (with several exceptions which act as bonus material between the main missions), as well as bonus artwork and features which are unlocked by progressing through the game and fulfilling secondary missions.

== Reception ==
Reception

Aggregate score
Aggregator	Score
GameRankings	72%

Review scores
Publication	Score
Consoles +	80%
Edge	5/10
Electronic Gaming Monthly	6.625/10 (Note: In Electronic Gaming Monthly's review of the game, two critics gave it each a score of 7/10, one gave it 5/10, and the other gave it 7.5/10.)
EP Daily	7/10
Game Informer	4.75/10
GameRevolution	B−
GameSpot	5.8/10
IGN	8.5/10
Next Generation	1/5
Official U.S. PlayStation Magazine	4/5
The Sydney Morning Herald	3/5

The game received above-average reviews according to the review aggregation website GameRankings. Rick Sanchez, writing for IGN, praised the design and production values. Joe Fielder of GameSpot was more critical, citing repetitive and slow gameplay. However, Jeffrey Adam Young of NextGen said, "It seems G-Police: Weapons of Justice was designed to be a very complex and full game, but in the process, the designers forgot to make the game playable as well."

Four-Eyed Dragon of GamePro said of the game in one review, "Fans of the original G-Police might want to rent the game for a night; otherwise, Weapons of Justice isn't even worth a badge of commendation." (Note: GamePro gave the game 1.5/5 for graphics, 3.5/5 for sound, and two 2.5/5 scores for control and fun factor in one review.) However, iBot said in another review, "This G-Police brings nothing new to the action genre, and with almost no dramatic storyline or character interaction, there is nothing really compelling enough to make you pick up the Weapons of Justice." (Note: GamePro gave the game 2.5/5 for graphics, two 3/5 scores for sound and fun factor, and 4/5 for control in another review.)
