= Rush Hour (video game) =

1997 video game

- Developer: Clockwork Entertainment
- Publisher: Psygnosis
- Platforms: PlayStation, Microsoft Windows
- Release: PlayStation: NA: April 30, 1997; EU: May 1, 1997; Windows: EU: 1997
- Genre: Racing video game
- Modes: Single player, multiplayer

Rush Hour, known in Europe as Speedster, is a video game developed by Clockwork Entertainment and published by Psygnosis for the PlayStation and Windows in 1997. The PlayStation version was ported to Japan and published by Nichibutsu under the name BattleRound USA (バトルラウンドUSA, BatoruRaundo USA) on April 29, 1998.

== Reception ==
Reception

Aggregate score
Aggregator	Score
GameRankings	56%

Review scores
Publication	Score
AllGame	2/5
CNET Gamecenter	7/10
Edge	6/10
Electronic Gaming Monthly	5.25/10 (Note: Two critics of Electronic Gaming Monthly gave the PlayStation version each a score of 4.5/10 and 6/10.)
GameFan	81% (Note: Two critics of GameFan gave the PlayStation version each a score of 80, and the other gave it 84.)
GamePro	2/5 (Note: GamePro gave the PlayStation version two 2.5/5 scores for graphics and sound, and two 2/5 scores for control and overall fun factor.)
GameRevolution	D−
GameSpot	6.9/10
Génération 4	(PC) 1/6
IGN	6/10
Joystick	(PC) 55%
Next Generation	3/5

The PlayStation version received mixed reviews according to the review aggregation website GameRankings. Next Generation said that the game "has a definite retrogaming flavor to its gameplay, but its contemporary graphics and execution give the experience new life."
