= Guilty (video game) =

1995 video game

- Developer: Divide By Zero
- Publisher: Psygnosis
- Platform: MS-DOS
- Release: 1995
- Genre: Adventure
- Mode: Single-player

Guilty is a graphic adventure game developede by Divide By Zero for MS-DOS and published in 1995 by Psygnosis. It is the sequel to Innocent Until Caught.

== Plot ==
The game's two main characters are Agent Ysanne Andropath and Jack T. Ladd. Ysanne, who works for the Federation Police and pilots the space ship Relentless, is a tough feminist/misandrist redhead, while Jack is a notorious thief and womanizer. The game starts with Ysanne capturing Jack for his crimes, when the player gets to choose one of the characters to play the game as. The locations and evolving plot are largely the same both ways, but the player can experience two sides of the story, and will be solving different puzzles.

After being jailed aboard the Relentless, Jack escapes his cell and destroys the ship's hyperdrive, when Ysanne is notified about a disaster on Lixa, a mining planet in the Altaros Nebula sector. It turns out that there is no one on the planet. As Jack the player has to find Tyrenium fuel for the ship, while Ysanne has to salvage the installation's logs. The clues lead to an invasion from another dimension.

The unwilling team visits other planets in order to triangulate the alien signals and locate their point of origin. One planet is Gelt which houses the Lucky Star casino/resort complex. There the player will meet Harrisienetta Fjord, the secretary of the casino owner who turns out to be Jack's old acquaintance, Tennant, and his girlfriend who is none other than Ruth P'Pau'D'P'Pau, Jack's love interest from the previous game. The Relentless is confiscated for different reasons depending on which is the protagonist and the player has to get it back.

The other planet, Broygus, is occupied by Federation military forces. Once again, the ship is confiscated by the local military for use in the war. Jack must steal back the Gyro Mechanism taken from their ship, while Ysanne tries to save the lives of soldiers who are being sacrificed needlessly.

When this task is complete, the protagonists receive a distress call from Lowe's Planet where they must save the colonists from an assault by an indigenous species. In that planet, the player will meet Nalm N'Palm, his sidekick from the previous game, who has joined the Interstellar Xenophobic Mercenary Force. Jack brings alien eggs to the leader Collins while Ysanne is fighting the mother of the creatures.

It is then discovered that the aliens come from the taxmen's station, the Corrupticon. On their way there they stop on the planet Haven which is a monastic retreat of retired taxmen. The protagonists are held captive there until the player dresses as a monk and causes the other protagonist to be "executed" for sacrilege.

The remaining protagonist reaches the Corrupticon where they meet the other protagonist who had teleported there. Also, they meet the villain from the previous game, P'Pau'D'P'Pau, who explains that events of the previous game and the breaking of his Transatron caused the aliens to find a way from Dimension 238 to this side of the universe. Finding the shards of the Transatron, the player closes the dimensional rift.

== Gameplay ==
The game uses a simple set of six actions the player can take. Inventory object graphics are shown in an inventory box at the bottom of the screen. Guilty uses rendered flight scenes for the spacecraft landing and taking off. The CD version of the game adds full speech for the two protagonists.
