= Innocent Until Caught =

1993 video game

- Developer: Divide By Zero
- Publisher: Psygnosis
- Platforms: Amiga, MS-DOS
- Release: 1993
- Genre: Adventure
- Mode: Single-player

Innocent Until Caught is a graphic adventure published in 1993 for Amiga and MS-DOS by Psygnosis. It was followed by Guilty.

== Plot ==
The game takes place in a space-borne setting, in the year 2171.

Jack T. Ladd is a thief, his hunting-ground is the whole galaxy, and at the moment, he's in big trouble. He's told by the IRDS (Interstellar Revenue Decimation Service) he's got 28 days to pay his taxes - or else the interstellar tax agency will hunt him down. Termination is a viable punishment for tax offenders in these days. Stranded blank on the barren, run-down planet Tayte, Jack decides that he has to make some cash. For that end he agrees to perform three quests for an individual (either the pawnbroker Ebeniezer or crime boss Git Savage): an egg of a Giant Kahoula bird, a bond for Quargian Pleno-credits stolen from the CitiCitiBank Bank vault, and an art exhibit by Renato Spangle from the Stoneybridge Gallery. When he brings all three items however, the player is set up and delivered to the police.

While in jail, an unknown benefactor gives him the means to escape the Alkaseltz Prison. With him comes Narm N'palm, an idiotic maniac who serves as Jack's sidekick for the remainder of the game. Jack is delivered to a space vessel run by a space Federation. He is told that Grand LordMaster P'PauD'P'Pau, the mad dictator of planet Shmul, developed the Transatron able to destroy whole star systems.

On his way to steal the superweapon from the Research Laboratory, Jack falls in love with the dictator's daughter, Ruthless P'PauD'P'Pau. They end up in SkyCity where the Transatron is kept; there Jack learns that it is not a superweapon, but an inter-dimensional jewel that will allow him to tap into the IRDS files and become the richest man in the universe; the Federation is after it not because it's dangerous, but to erase some of its debts.

In the end, the Transatron and Skycity are destroyed because of one of Nalm's blunders and Jack escapes with Ruth, having managed to erase his own debts.

== Reception ==
Reception

Review scores
Publication	Score
Hyper	70%
PC Gamer (UK)	80%
Electronic Entertainment	4 out of 10

Computer Gaming World's Charles Ardai in 1994 stated that Innocent Until Caught was "sometimes disappointing but never dull". He complained of the many bugs ("Innocent broke down at least once every half dozen screens") and other problems, but "I suppose it is a good sign that even with all the bugs, I never felt inclined to stop playing. Jack's story is interesting enough ... the puzzles clever enough, and most of the graphics and sound good enough". Ardai concluded that "it is rare that a game startles me in the way this one did ... Unusual games earn points in my book, as do daring ones, and Innocent is both".

PC Gamer's Andy Butcher praised the game's graphics and presentation. However, stated that "it tries to be funny, and even succeeds at points, but the jokes tend to fall halfway between intelligent wit and Red Dwarf style parody". And added, "it's not clever enough to count as a classic", citing Sam & Max Hit the Road as an example of a better title in the genre.

James V. Trunzo reviewed Innocent Until Caught in White Wolf #44 (June, 1994), giving it a final evaluation of "Fair" and stated that "Mom always said to find something good to say or to keep my mount shut. Okay, Innocent Until Caught has a sense of humor. Some of the dialogue made me smile. And I always enjoy playing a rogue character; Jack Ladd definitely walks on the wild side. There. Satisfied, Mom?"
