= Adidas Power Soccer =

1996 video game

- North American PlayStation box art
- Developer(s): Psygnosis
- Publisher(s): Psygnosis
- Series: Adidas Power Soccer
- Platform(s): PlayStation, Windows
- Release: PlayStation: EU: 10 June 1996; NA: 31 August 1996; Windows; 1996
- Genre(s): Sports (association football)
- Mode(s): Single-player

Adidas Power Soccer is a 1996 association football video game developed and published by Psygnosis for the PlayStation and Microsoft Windows. The game, sponsored by German sportswear company Adidas, is the first in the Adidas Power Soccer series, and spawned the sequels Adidas Power Soccer International 97 and Adidas Power Soccer 98.

== Gameplay ==
Adidas Power Soccer uses motion-captured animation for real soccer players from the German, Italian, and English leagues.

== Development ==
A Sega Saturn version of the game was developed by Perfect Entertainment and was reportedly completed before being cancelled. Saturn Power magazine reported that it would have been "placed between" Adidas Power Soccer and Adidas Power Soccer 98 in terms of features and gameplay, but that all in-game sounds had to be replaced entirely as they were the copyright of Psygnosis.

== Reception ==
Reception

Aggregate score
Aggregator	Score
GameRankings	60.42% (PS1)

Review score
Publication	Score
The Charlotte Observer	2.5/5

In the United Kingdom, it was among the nineteen best-selling PlayStation games of 1996, according to HMV.

Next Generation reviewed the PlayStation version of the game, rating it three stars out of five, and stated that "If you're looking for the perfect soccer sim, Worldwide Soccer II is still the only choice, but Adidas Power Soccer is more than worth the purchase if you're in for some far-out arcade action." GameSpot rated the game 7/10, stating that Power Soccer "rises high above the standard soccer fare... fans will love all the detail and options".

== See also ==
- This Is Football
