= Krazy Ivan =

1996 video game

- North American PlayStation box art
- Developer: Psygnosis (Note: Ported to Windows by Tantalus Interactive. Saturn version ported by Perfect Entertainment.)
- Publisher: Psygnosis
- Composers: Tim Wright; Mike Clarke
- Platforms: PlayStation, Windows, Sega Saturn
- Release: PlayStation: EU: 26 January 1996; NA: 23 February 1996; Windows: EU: 1996; NA: 20 December 1996; Saturn: EU: 23 May 1997
- Genre: First-person shooter
- Modes: Single-player, multiplayer

Krazy Ivan is a 1996 first-person shooter video game published by Psygnosis for Windows, Sega Saturn, and PlayStation. The player takes the role of Ivan Popovich, a Russian soldier controlling a giant mechanical suit, defending the Earth from robotic aliens. The game consists of five zones: Russia, Saudi Arabia, France, the United States and Japan. The game has an interface at the end of each zone allowing the player to spend the game's form of experience points (power cores) on upgrades and weapons.

The game uses full-motion video for its intro movie and a cutscene between each level. The soundtrack was written and produced by Mike Clarke and Tim Wright.

== Development ==
The live-action cutscenes were all filmed using the blue screen technique.

== Release ==
Despite being demonstrated at a Sega of America games exhibition in 1996 and reviewed in the major North American gaming magazines of the time, the Saturn version of Krazy Ivan was never released in North America. The North American reviews for the Saturn version ranged from middling to outright negative. THQ planned to release the Sega Saturn version of the game in the US, but later withdrew support for the system due to its dwindling presence in the market.

== Reception ==
Reception

Review scores
Publication	Score
Electronic Gaming Monthly	9/10, 7/10, 7/10, 8/10 (PS1)
GameSpot	5.4/10 (PC)
Hyper	75/100 (PS1)
Next Generation	3/5 (PS1); 2/5 (SAT)
Maximum	2/5 (PS1)
Sega Saturn Magazine	75% (SAT)

Krazy Ivan received generally mixed reviews. Air Hendrix gave the PlayStation version a mixed review in GamePro, saying the gameplay is repetitive and requires little strategy but demands fast reflexes, the controls are tight but conspicuously lack the ability to jump, and the graphics are detailed but suffer from slowdown. He concluded that "Krazy Ivan has some problems, but it stands tall above its Saturn counterpart, Ghen War." Electronic Gaming Monthly called it the first great mech game for the console and praised the graphics, the cinematics, the controls, and the close guidance through mission objectives, but they criticized the lack of replay value. A Next Generation critic praised the animation, heavy use of distance fog, PlayStation Link Cable support, and FMV sequences which "range from painless to humorous." However, he criticized that the levels, despite being set all around the world, all look the same, and that the game can be beaten in just a few hours. Maximum summarized that Krazy Ivan "is far too limited and, in all honesty, suffers from the perennial problem of presentation over playability." They specifically found that the game offers no motivation for the player to not simply head straight to the boss of each stage and defeat it using the simple strategy of firing while strafing.

Next Generation reviewed the Saturn version of the game and stated that "The gameplay [...] is still as sharp as ever, making this a respectable but unexciting game for the Saturn library." Paul Glancey of Sega Saturn Magazine praised the graphics and premise, but criticized the gameplay as being shallow and overly easy, with the simple strategy of sidestepping and firing working in most situations.

Reviewing the PC version, GameSpot echoed Sega Saturn Magazine by praising the graphics and premise but ultimately dismissing the game for going no deeper than a sidestep-and-fire strategy.
