= Retro Force =

1999 video game

- Cover art featuring from right to left: Hawtin Raydar, Pi, Paris Tetsuo and Sinclair
- Developer: Psygnosis Leeds
- Publisher: Psygnosis
- Designer: Wayne Imlach
- Composer: Gary McKill
- Platform: PlayStation
- Release: EU: 12 March 1999
- Genre: Shoot 'em up
- Modes: Single-player, multiplayer

Retro Force is a 1999 shoot 'em up video game developed and published by Psygnosis for the PlayStation. It was only released in Europe.

== Gameplay ==
In Retro Force, you get to play as one of the four members of Retro Force, you can get to choose either Paris, Hawtin, Pi, or Sinclair whatever suits your skill, but they each have their own aerial attributes, with your chosen character, you then have to shoot down your enemies from the sky and from the ground, you'll get to earn points by shooting down the enemies. And also, you get to collect Bonus crystals, the more bonus crystals you collect, the bigger the score, and of course keep an eye on the super crystals, they hide in hard to reach places and in secret hiding places.

== Plot ==
The story is taken place on 29 November 2999 where the invasion starts and the Millennium celebration began to a halt, a giant UFO came towards the temple called the Commune of Worship which is home to the Holy Artifact, as the sirens blare at Combat Air Defense Academy(CADA), Retro Force battle out the UFO to stop them from taking the Holy Artifact, but they were too late as the final piece of the Holy Artifact combined with the rest, powers were unleashed leaving Retro force and the UFO disappear back through time.

== Reception ==
Reception

Review scores
Publication	Score
PlayStation Official Magazine – UK	5/10
MAN!AC	54% and 2 Stars
NowGamer	4.3/10
PlayStation Zone (Germany)	77%

Retro Force received mixed to negative reviews. Official UK PlayStation Magazine gave the game a 5 out of 10, while Das Offizielle PlayStation Magazin gave it a 3.3 out of 10. The only positive review was from the German PlayStation magazine called PlayStation Zone (later PlayZone), which gave a score of 77% and also included a playable demo of the game on its cover disc of the fourth issue, in where the game was reviewed.

In one particular review from a German games magazine called MAN!AC, the review, which scored the game two stars, described the "brave pilots" on the cover above as "clowns".
