= Hexx: Heresy of the Wizard =

1994 video game

- Developer: TAG Games
- Publisher: Psygnosis
- Platform: MS-DOS
- Release: 1994
- Genre: Role-playing
- Mode: Single-player

Hexx: Heresy of the Wizard is a 1994 role-playing video game developed by TAG Games, founded by Anthony Taglione who had developed Bloodwych and Legend. It was published by Psygnosis for the MS-DOS. The player controls a party of four pre-generated characters as they navigate a dungeon in search of talismans to stop an evil wizard.

Hexx: Heresy of the Wizard received mixed reception from critics.

== Gameplay ==
Hexx: Heresy of the Wizard is a first person perspective dungeon crawl role-playing game. Its plot revolves around four mages who are tasked with defeating an evil wizard, called The Nameless One, and finding four talismans containing God's of magic, who were sealed by the wizard to enhance his own power. At the start of the game, the player selects their four characters from a selection of sixteen available.

Once in the dungeon, there are shops scattered about for buying and selling equipment.

== Reception ==
Reception

Review scores
Publication	Score
Computer Game Review	82%
PC Joker	74%
Pelit	70/100
Power Play	61%
Score	48%

James V. Trunzo reviewed Hexx: Heresy of the Wizard in White Wolf Inphobia #51 (Jan., 1995), rating it a 3 out of 5 and stated that "Hexx has some fun ideas, especially in its use of characters and magic system. The game is enjoyable, but from a technology standpoint, it lags behind the pack."

Scorpia for Computer Gaming World described it as "no more than the usual dungeon crawl, with some nice features and some annoying ones" and "fairly mediocre, and a little boring, in fact".

Barry Brenesal for Electronic Entertainment called it "a solid, up-to-date hack-and-slash game that's tough to master but fun to play".
