= Predator 2 (1992 video game) =

1992 video game

- Developers: Perfect 10 Productions (Genesis); Teeny Weeny Games (Master System/Game Gear)
- Publisher: Acclaim Entertainment (Note: Released under the Arena Entertainment brand name.)
- Composer: Matt Furniss
- Platforms: Game Gear, Genesis, Master System
- Release: Genesis; NA: 1992; EU: October 29, 1992; Game Gear; NA: 1992; EU: 1992 Master System; EU: January 1993
- Genre: Action
- Mode: Single-player

Predator 2 is a 1992 second video game adaptation of the film of the same title, developed by Perfect 10 Productions and Teeny Weeny Games and published by Acclaim Entertainment. It was released for the Sega Genesis, Game Gear, and Master System.

== Reception ==
Reception

Review scores
Publication	Score
Play Time	77%
Diehard GameFan	72% (Genesis)
Sega Master Force	68% (Master System)
Mega Fun	41% (Game Gear)
Mega	28% (Genesis)

Diehard GameFan gave the Genesis version of Predator 2 a score of 72%, comparing it to Smash TV with the freedom to move around, but "overall found it to be a little too average from beginning to end."

German magazine Play Time gave it a positive review and a score of 77%, but the Game Gear version received a low score of 41% from German magazine Mega Fun. Mega gave the game a negative score of 28%.
