= Perfect Entertainment =

British video game developer

- Type: Proprietary limited company
- Industry: Video games
- Founded: 1991
- Defunct: 1999
- Headquarters: London, United Kingdom,
- Key people: Angela Sutherland, CEO and Co-founder; Gregg Barnett, Creative Director and Co-founder; Colin Fuidge, Producer; Paul Mitchell, Art Director
- Products: See complete products listing
- Number of employees: 70
- Subsidiaries: Tantalus Entertainment (1995-1998)

Perfect Entertainment was an independent British computer game developer. It began in 1991 as Teeny Weeny Games headed by Angela Sutherland but changed names when merging exclusively with Gregg Barnett's Perfect 10 Productions, a company previously known as Beam Software (UK).

== History ==
Perfect Entertainment is best known for its popular point-and-click adventure games Discworld, Discworld II: Missing Presumed...!? and Discworld Noir, which are based on the Terry Pratchett novel series Discworld.

The company made its origins in 1990 when Gregg Barnett founded a British division of Beam Software, called Beam Europe, or Beam Software UK, which was sold to Barnett and renamed to Perfect 10 Productions, and Angela Sutherland worked at Perfect 10 before leaving to form Teeny Weeny Games in 1991, mainly for original concepts and ports, and its name was taken from a lullaby song.

Teeny Weeny Games was the initial funding source of Perfect Entertainment's speculative product demo of Discworld. In 1995, Teeny Weeny Games merged with Perfect 10 Productions to form Perfect Entertainment. Perfect Entertainment produced the majority of Psygnosis games ported to the Sega Saturn, since Sony, owner of Psygnosis, wasn't willing to fund games for a rival console. In 1995, they acquired Tantalus Entertainment some time after its founding.

Perfect Entertainment's Manchester offices were destroyed in the 1996 IRA bombing. They were developing Discworld II and Saturn port of FIFA 97 at the time.

Most of the assets, staff and risks of Perfect Entertainment were absorbed into what became Teeny Weeny Games' second incarnation in 1999 on the completion of the Discworld Noir. Partly due to a costly and protracted legal dispute with Psygnosis over unpaid royalties and fees which were eventually settled out of court and partly due to arguments at board level, it was decided to scale the company down to allow unhappy stakeholders to leave. Tantalus Entertainment (now Tantalus Media) in Melbourne, Australia was sold back to its original directors. In early 2000, Teeny Weeny Games was contracted by 20th Century Fox to supply "The World's Scariest Car Chases" on a $3,600,000 contract, a game already under development for over a year. The producer of this project and various other staff bought a majority shareholding and took over the company. Teeny Weeny Games closed a year later.

== Games ==
=== Teeny Weeny Games ===
- 1992: Predator 2 (Master System, Game Gear)
- 1992: The Incredible Crash Dummies (Master System, Game Gear)
- 1992: Fire Fighter (Game Boy)
- 1992: Xenon 2: Megablast (Game Boy)
- 1993: WWF WrestleMania: Steel Cage Challenge (Master System, Game Gear)
- 1993: Choplifter III (Game Gear, Game Boy)
- 1993: Last Action Hero (NES)
- 1993: The Simpsons: Bartman Meets Radioactive Man (Game Gear)
- 1994: BloodNet (Amiga)
- 1994: Fido Dido (Mega Drive/Genesis)
- 1994: Wolverine: Adamantium Rage (Mega Drive/Genesis)
- 1995: Pocahontas (MS-DOS)
- 1995: Primal Rage (MS-DOS)
- 1995: Discworld (MS-DOS, Macintosh, PlayStation)
- 1996: Discworld (Saturn)
- 1996: Screamball: The Ultimate Pinball Challenge (MS-DOS)

=== Perfect 10 Productions ===
- 1992: Predator 2 (Mega Drive/Genesis)
- 1995: Discworld (MS-DOS, Macintosh, PlayStation)
- 1996: Discworld (Saturn)

=== Perfect Entertainment ===
- 1996: Discworld II: Missing Presumed...!? (MS-DOS, Windows)
- 1996: 3D Lemmings (Saturn)
- 1996: Destruction Derby (Saturn)
- 1997: FIFA 97 (Saturn)
- 1997: Krazy Ivan (Saturn)
- 1997: Wipeout 2097 (Saturn)
- 1997: Discworld II: Missing Presumed...!? (PlayStation, Saturn)
- 1997: Assault Rigs (Saturn)
- 1997: Adidas Power Soccer (unpublished Saturn version)
- 1997: Adidas Power Soccer (Windows)
- 1997: Destruction Derby 2 (unpublished Saturn version)
- 1999: Discworld Noir (Windows)

=== Teeny Weeny Games (post-Perfect Entertainment) ===
- 2000: Discworld Noir (PlayStation)
- 2000: World's Scariest Police Chases: Deadly Pursuit (Dreamcast, cancelled)
