= Last Action Hero (video game) =

1994 video game

- North American NES box art
- Developers: NES; Teeny Weeny Games; Super NES, Genesis, Game Boy, Game Gear; Bits Studios; Amiga; The Dome
- Publishers: Sony Imagesoft; Psygnosis
- Producer: Tony Parkes
- Composers: Amiga; Mike Clarke; NES; Marshall Parker; Super NES; Shahid Ahmad; Genesis; Shahid Ahmad
- Platforms: NES, Super NES, Genesis, Game Boy, Game Gear, Amiga, MS-DOS
- Release: October 1993: NES, Game Boy; NA: October 1993 Game Gear; NA: 1993 Genesis, Super NES; NA: January 26, 1994 Amiga; NA: 1994 MS-DOS; NA: 1994
- Genres: Action, beat em up
- Mode: Single-player

Last Action Hero is a series of action video games based on the 1993 film Last Action Hero. Versions were released for the NES, Super NES, Sega Genesis, Game Boy, Game Gear, and MS-DOS. Versions were also planned for the Sega CD and Master System, but ultimately were not released.

A separate version was released on the Amiga and was developed by The Dome. The MS-DOS version was developed by Psygnosis and offers full-motion video cut scenes from the film; the never-released Sega CD version was planned to include this feature as well.

== Gameplay ==
An overhead driving sequence from the MS-DOS version

Last Action Hero is based on the 1993 film Last Action Hero. Taking the form of a side-scrolling beat-'em-up, in the SNES and Genesis version players have a strict time limit to defeat each level of the game. Every version of the game has the climactic showdown with Mr. Benedict (the movie's primary villain), except for the NES, Game Boy, and Game Gear versions. There are two car chase stages: one in Jack Slater's "movie" world and another in Danny Madigan's "real" world. The NES and Amiga versions however do not feature any car levels.

The NES version has an original element that none of the other versions have: a stage that portrays Danny Madigan's "version" of the classic Shakespeare play Hamlet.

== Development and release ==
Last Action Hero was released for seven platforms: Nintendo Entertainment System (NES), Super Nintendo Entertainment System (SNES), Sega Genesis, Game Boy, Game Gear, Amiga and MS-DOS. None of the versions feature guns or any other weapons. Most of these games were developed by Bits Studios, while the Amiga version was developed by The Dome. Sony Imagesoft published the game across most platforms, and Sony's Psygnosis published the Amiga version.

Rich Robinson, executive producer at Sony Imagesoft, oversaw the filming of Last Action Hero as well as the development of the game adaptation, to ensure consistency between the two. Sony's Columbia Pictures, which produced the film, had an interest in the game throughout its development. Initially, the studio provided the various developers with a script for the film to help form the basis of the game. Columbia also provided stills from the film which helped the game artists. Later, the developers of the Amiga version saw some rough cuts of the film and then made small alterations to their game to keep it faithful to the film.

Versions of the game were planned for the Sega CD and Master System, but these ultimately were not released. The Sega CD version was in development by a team of 11 people, led by producer Steve Riding of Psygnosis. The Sega CD version was to include motion video footage from the film. However, because of limited film footage, the team had to create some of their own footage for the CD version, using Silicon Graphics computers. Regarding the lack of weapons in the game, Riding stated that the film's star, Arnold Schwarzenegger, "feels that if children are constantly subjected to these violent images on the screen, they will identify with the violence and project it through to their real lives." According to Riding, the lack of weapons did not present any major challenges in creating the game.

Development of the Amiga version commenced in July 1993, at which point the Sega CD version was already three months into development. The Sega CD version would be a slightly upgraded version of the Amiga game. As with the other versions of the game, the Amiga developers were restricted from depicting the playable character with any offensive weapons, and therefore chose to make it a beat 'em up game. Tony Parkes, the game's producer, said the team used "the comic element that was present throughout the film" and made the entire game "very cartoony in a 'Tom and Jerry' kind of way."

The film's character of Danny Madigan was excluded as a playable character in the games because Columbia felt that a child in a beat 'em up game would not go over well. The Amiga version was to include a multiplayer option in which a second player could play as Jack Slater's daughter Whitney or as an animated cat police officer, both of whom appeared in the film.

In the United States, the Genesis and SNES versions were released on January 26, 1994, coinciding with the home video release of the film. Each copy of the Genesis and SNES versions had an unusually high wholesale price of $60-$70, with a resulting $100 retail price, which was too high for most consumers. As a result, the two game versions were originally only available as rentals for a minimum seven-month period. After the seven-month rental period was up, the two game versions would be repriced for consumer retail.

The Amiga version, released in 1994, is compatible with Amiga 500, Amiga 600, and Amiga 1200 computers.

== Reception ==
Reception

Review scores
Publication	Score
AllGame	1/5 (Genesis/SNES)
Amiga Action	28% (Amiga)
Amiga Format	16% (Amiga)
Amiga Power	3% (Amiga)
Game Players	19% (Game Gear); 33% (SNES)
Nintendo Power	12/20 (NES)
Total!	6% (SNES)
Video Games (DE)	18% (SNES)
The One Amiga	8% (Amiga)
Amiga World	D− (Amiga)

Last Action Hero received negative reviews. Amiga Action called the Amiga version "utter trash" and wrote about the beat 'em up gameplay, "It's been done a million times before and each one of those million has been better executed than this." Stephen Bradley of Amiga Format criticized the game and the large number of enemy respawns. The One Amiga criticized the repetitive gameplay and background scenery, and called it "without a shadow of a doubt, the worst game ever." The magazine also considered the gameplay simplistic, writing that enemies could be "easily dispatched by simply sidling up to them and holding down the fire button," sending the player into a "punch-frenzy". Stuart Campbell of Amiga Power had the same complaints about repetitive scenery and the use of the fire button to easily dispatch enemies. Campbell wrote that Psygnosis and The Dome "should be utterly ashamed of themselves" for their involvement in the game. Peter Olafson of Amiga World was dismissive, calling it a poor Double Dragon clone and compared it to a monotonous nightmare.

Game Players called the SNES version a "dull, lifeless, and frustration-filled" fighting game. The magazine was also critical of the Game Gear version, writing that it lacked action and would likely only appeal to fans of puzzle video games. In later reviews for the website AllGame, Brett Alan Weiss heavily criticized the Genesis and SNES versions, believing they were rushed through development in order to capitalize on the film.

Last Action Hero sold 100,000 units.
