= Assault Rigs =

1996 video game

- Developers: Psygnosis; Perfect Entertainment (Saturn)
- Publisher: Psygnosis
- Composer: Matt Furniss
- Platforms: MS-DOS, PlayStation, Saturn
- Release: PlayStation: NA: 31 January 1996; EU: 9 February 1996; JP: 4 October 1996; MS-DOS: NA: February 1996; EU: 9 February 1996; Saturn: JP: 11 September 1997
- Genre: Vehicular combat
- Modes: Single-player, multiplayer

Assault Rigs is a vehicular combat game developed and published by Psygnosis and released in 1996 for MS-DOS compatible operating systems and the PlayStation. It was released a year later for the Sega Saturn in Japan. The game takes place in the future, where real sport has been overtaken in favour of virtual sport, the most popular being Assault Rigs, a tank simulator set inside a 3D virtual environment.

The goal of the single-player game is to collect all of the gems in a level, while destroying or avoiding enemies, ultimately reaching the exit. There are 42 levels with ramps, elevators, skyways, trenches, movable blocks, and push rods. There are 20 weapon power-ups, viruses and Dolby Surround sound. The levels have 4 themes: VR, Industrial, Military, and War.

Assault Rigs can use the PlayStation Link Cable, enabling two players to connect two PlayStations and play head-to-head on two televisions. 15 additional levels are available when using the cable. The MS-DOS version has multiplayer which can be played with either a serial link (two player) or a network (up to eight players).

THQ planned to release the Saturn version of the game in the US, but later withdrew support for the Saturn due to its dwindling presence in the market.

== Gameplay ==
Players control their rig to collect all the gems and reach the end goal in each of the game's 42 levels. In the Saturn version, all of the levels were the same as the PlayStation and PC versions, but they were given different names. Along the way, players can collect various types of weapons from missiles to land mines. Throughout each level, players must contend with various enemies from turrets to enemy rigs. Aerial enemies called "viruses" also attack the player's rig, while hazards like electric gates and mines dot each level. There are also mild puzzle-solving elements such as pushing blocks and building bridges.

== Reception ==
Reception

Review scores
Publication	Score
AllGame	3/5
Next Generation	2/5
PC PowerPlay	5/10
Play	81%
Maximum	3/5

GamePro gave the PlayStation version a mixed review. They criticized the oversensitive controls, lack of split screen multiplayer, background flicker, and inappropriate music, but praised the diverse gameplay, focus on problem-solving, and futuristic graphics, and concluded that "Noodling through Assault Rigs will be great fun for those who like a touch of thinking with their shooting." Maximum gave the game credit for its "increasingly complex level designs" and the diversion of the arena levels, but asserted that "This game, while sounding quite entertaining in theory, unfortunately has a variety of problems in practice", citing poor camera angles, glitching graphics, and an overly easy and linear progression. Both GamePro and Maximum compared the game favorably to Cyber Sled. Next Generation's brief review deemed the game unexciting and scored it two out of five stars. Offering the game a score of 76/100, Scott Gehrs of Computer Game Review wrote, "I can't think of a better game to play when you've got some time to kill."

== Reviews ==
- Australian Realms #29
