= Nations: WWII Fighter Command =

1999 video game

- Developer: Psygnosis
- Publisher: Psygnosis
- Platform: Windows
- Release: 1999
- Genre: Combat flight simulator

Nations: WWII Fighter Command is a combat flight simulation video game developed by Psygnosis and released for Microsoft Windows in 1999.

== Gameplay ==
Nations: WWII Fighter Command is a hybrid flight simulation in which players take control of WWII aircraft from Britain, Germany, and the United States, engaging in dogfights, bomber escorts, and ground attacks across 45 campaign missions and 10 instant action scenarios. The flight model is grounded in real-world physics, simulating forces like lift, thrust, drag, and gravity, while allowing players to adjust realism settings to suit their skill level. Damage modeling is detailed, affecting up to 12 aircraft systems and altering performance mid-flight. Each plane features a unique cockpit based on its historical counterpart, and the game includes a database of over 30 aircraft, though only 12 are pilotable. Visuals feature dynamic lighting, weather effects, and immersive cockpit views. Multiplayer supports up to eight players in deathmatch and team deathmatch modes, with mid-air power-ups adding a twist to traditional dogfighting.

== Development ==
The game was announced in May 1998 and was showcased at the Electronic Entertainment Expo that year.

== Reception ==
Reception

Review scores
Publication	Score
Computer Gaming World	1/5
Gamezilla	38/100
IGN	6.8/10
Jeuxvideo	11/20
PC Joker	60%
PC Gamer	10%

Jesse Hiatt from Computer Gaming World gave the game a score of 1 out of 5, criticizing the average graphics, oversimplified flight models, boring missions, and the ineffective controls.
