= Team Buddies =

2000 video game

- European cover art including a Parental Guidance warning. The North American version is rated "E" due to censorship of profanity.
- Developer: Psygnosis Camden
- Publishers: EU: Sony Computer Entertainment; NA: Midway Home Entertainment
- Producer: James Baker
- Designer: Russell Kerrison
- Programmer: Dave Sullivan
- Artist: Chris Petts
- Composer: Alastair Lindsay
- Platform: PlayStation
- Release: EU: 15 September 2000; NA: 18 September 2000
- Genres: Action, Real-time strategy
- Modes: Single-player, multiplayer

Team Buddies is a 2000 action strategy video game developed by Psygnosis and published by Sony Computer Entertainment for the PlayStation. It was released by Midway Games in North America. It was also the last game developed by Psygnosis' Camden Town studio before it was moved to Sony.

== Plot ==
The game is set in Buddie World, a peaceful world inhabited by pill-shaped creatures called "Buddies". One day, an eclipse occurs, and crates fall from the sky. After finding weapons inside the crates, the Buddies are segregated by colour and begin fighting for supremacy.

As the violence spills into other regions of Buddie World, the player learns that the other teams are being assisted by a scientist called Doctor Madasalorrie, who has also been experimenting on animals in Buddie World. The player eventually meets Madasalorrie and persuades him to defect. However, he later goes missing and is presumed dead after failing to destroy an enemy-run factory, forcing the player to complete his mission.

It is later revealed that the crates came from the Baddie Moon, which is inhabited by cube-shaped creatures called "Baddies". The Baddies dropped the crates to Buddie World and filmed the ensuing carnage for a television show. The player travels to the Baddie Moon and is tasked by the president of Buddie World with killing the Baddies and destroying their capital city, which is the source of the crates.

The player later learns that Madasalorrie is still alive and is a Baddie disguised as a Buddie. He helped boost the ratings of the Baddies' TV show by having the Buddies kill each other with more lethal weapons. The season finale of the show involves Madasalorrie using a death ray to destroy Buddie World. The player kills Madasalorrie, rescues the moon's aliens before the moon's largest volcano erupts, and destroys Madasalorrie's most powerful killing machine, restoring peace and order to Buddie World.

== Gameplay ==
The player, as a blue Buddy, has shot a tree using a tank, to release a health pick-up.

The game is a mix of Worms' humour and a typical real-time strategy game. Central to the game's theme is the ability of a team of buddies to stack crates in a 2×2×2 pad located in their starting area. Stacking the crates in different ways make different items when the resulting larger crate is broken; for example, a single crate on a stacking pad produces a light weapon, four crates positioned horizontally makes a heavy weapon, and filling the pad creates a vehicle. The battle toys created are based on the selected world, and there are eight original worlds, plus many special sets unlocked once players complete story mode. Most vehicles can carry two crates, but larger vehicles (and the golf cart) can carry three. Up to three additional team members can also be created by stacking crates directly on top of each other; these new "buddies" can be commanded to attack or defend a certain area or even build on the stacking pad on their own. The player can swap between any of the buddies under his or her control in order to make use of that particular unit's powers or weapons.

In addition to a stacking pad, each starting point has a large base building which can be attacked and destroyed. If a base is destroyed, the stacking pad for that team can no longer be used; this means that new members cannot be created, making destroying the base a top priority for securing victory. A team without a base is also unable to build new weapons and must rely on those dropped by the enemy or found around the map (although a fast unit can steal a weapon from an enemy pad as it is being opened).

A typical map will have various "crate drop" areas (in most cases a small area at the players base and a much larger spawn in the middle of the map), where the crates used to build weapons and team-mates fall from the sky. Most crates in the game are yellow with red borders, but yellow crates with blue borders also drop from time to time. Adding one of these to a crate formation causes the object or unit created by it to have increased abilities; for example, a higher rate of fire or range for a weapon or more hit points for a unit or vehicle. In certain maps, mega-crates also drop if certain conditions are met; these large, grey and yellow crates contain a weapon or vehicle not normally found in that particular area, and can be towed behind a Mech, but not behind other vehicles.

Team Buddies also supports split-screen multi-player for up to four players. There are several different game types in multi-player:

=== Deathmatch ===
A straightforward game type in which all the members of all opposing teams must be eliminated to win. If there are two or more human players and three or more players overall, the rabanete option can be turned on (unlocked after beating the game). In this mode, the last member of a eliminated team remains in play as a slow-moving, invisible ghost. If the ghost walks into the smoking boots of a recently killed unit, it is resurrected and can continue to stack crates and attack enemies.

=== Domination ===
Around the map are "domination points," which can be anything, from ankhs to trees, that must be captured in order to achieve victory. Holding a domination point for 5 seconds gives a team a point; multiple domination points grant multiple points, and the first team to reach the required number of points wins. In the event of time running out, the team with the highest number of points wins. Domination points are captured simply by touching them. Teams cannot be eliminated in a Domination match; if all members of a team are destroyed, another unit of the lowest type spawns at their stacking pad, armed with the lowest available weapon if the pad has been deactivated.

=== Capture ===
Similar to capture the flag, this game type requires teams to steal animals from an enemy's pen and return them to their own pen. Animals include dogs, penguins, pigs, and sheep. Animals must be stunned with an attack before picking them up (animals cannot be killed in multi-player). The animals will attempt to break free if carried (even by their own team) and return to their pen. Shooting a unit carrying an animal causes it to drop the animal. Ten points are awarded for capturing the enemies animal, with five bonus points awarded if your team still has their animal.

=== Bomball ===
An explosive grey ball is spawned at the centre of the arena. Each team has three members armed with the lowest weapon of the game's chosen weapon set; if killed, an identical one will spawn shortly after. The goal of the game is to carry the ball to an enemy goal and throw it between the two goalposts. Once a ball is thrown, a timer begins to count down; once the timer reaches zero, the ball explodes, dealing damage to any nearby buddies. One point is awarded for throwing the ball through a set of goalposts, and additional six points are given for a ball exploding in the goal area immediately behind them.

== Style ==
One of the distinctive aspects of Team Buddies is its visual style and choice of dialogue. Censorship in the United States caused the game's vulgar and stereotyped character dialogue originally used for characters to be toned down. The European version of the game gave each character class different voice identities, and additionally gives each multi-player team colour its own nationality; for example blue team are stereotypical English, whereas purple are 'engrish' style Japanese.

All the buddies and various other creatures in the game have pill-shaped bodies and disjointed limbs reminiscent of Rayman, with the exception of the moon-dwelling enemies encountered late in the single-player game. Environments are brightly coloured and angular, gaining most of their detail through texturing rather than more detailed polygons. Nearly all of the weapons encountered are similarly simplistic and usually one or two solid colours and with clear arrows pointing out the way projectiles are fired from them. Terrain darkens and deforms if hit with an explosion, creating fairly realistic craters and scorch marks where a battle has taken place.

In multiplayer, a variety of skins can be unlocked to personalize a particular match, including zombie skins, underwear skins and English football uniforms.

== Reception ==
Reception

Aggregate score
Aggregator	Score
GameRankings	72%

Review scores
Publication	Score
Consoles +	77%
Computer and Video Games	4/5
Electronic Gaming Monthly	7/10 (Note: Three critics of Electronic Gaming Monthly gave the game each a score of 7/10.)
Game Informer	7.25/10
GameFan	(G.N.) 87% 78% (Note: In GameFan's viewpoint of the game, three critics gave it each a score of 68, 77, and 88.)
GameRevolution	B+
GameSpot	4.8/10
IGN	8.5/10
Jeuxvideo.com	12/20
Official U.S. PlayStation Magazine	3.5/5

Team Buddies received above-average reviews according to the review aggregation website GameRankings. IGN's Scott Steinberg praised the overall presentation and noted that it is "fun, it's original, and it's a little clunky", calling it "a thinking man's shooter." GameSpot's Frank Provo was considerably more critical, saying that "no amount of multimedia candy can save this game from its main flaw: boredom." GameRevolution gave it a favorable over a month before it was released.
