= Barbarian (1987 video game) =

- Artwork by Roger Dean.
- Developer: Psygnosis
- Publisher: Psygnosis
- Series: Barbarian
- Platforms: Atari ST, Amiga, Amstrad CPC, Commodore 64, MS-DOS, MSX, ZX Spectrum
- Release: 1987: Atari ST, Amiga; 1988: Amstrad, C64, MS-DOS, Spectrum
- Genre: Platform
- Mode: Single-player

Barbarian is a 1987 platform game by Psygnosis. It was first developed for the Amiga and Atari ST, and was ported to the Commodore 64, MS-DOS, MSX, Amstrad CPC and ZX Spectrum. The cover artwork (part of "Red Dragon" figure/landscape) is by fantasy artist Roger Dean.

The game spawned a 1991 sequel, Barbarian II.

== Gameplay ==
Opening animation from the Amiga version

The game opens with an animation of a muscle-bound barbarian cutting a chain with a sword. On the Amiga and Atari ST versions, the animation is accompanied by a loud, digital sound effect.

In the game, the player is Hegor, a barbarian who must traverse several dungeons and underground habitats to defeat his brother, the evil sorcerer Necron. He has a sword, a shield and bow in his arsenal of weapons. Running and jumping, as with many platform games, comprises a large part of the gameplay of this title.

The game used a unique control system to make up for lack of more than one joystick button on many systems. The player would first press the one button after which a "menu" of actions would appear along the bottom of the screen. The player then selected the desired action by cycling through the choices with the joystick and then pressing the button again when the desired action was highlighted.

In the original versions, this game tried to emulate the visual style of the game cover and opening animation. The game used very detailed and colorful sprites and a variety of thoughtful sound effects to accompany the onscreen action. The IBM PC version plays digitized speech in the opening sequence and other sound effects using the speaker.

== Reception ==
David Plotkin of STart praised Barbarian's graphics and sound as "the most impressive I've ever seen in an ST game". He hesitated to recommend the game, however, because the lack of savegame forced restarts after the frequent unavoidable deaths. The game was reviewed in 1989 in Dragon #150 by Courtney Harrington in "The Role of Computers" column. Harrington gave the game 4 out of 5 stars. A review in Amstrad Action issue 40 gave the game 81%, stating it was "fun, but lacking in the long term".
