= Kingsley's Adventure =

1999 video game

- Developer: Psygnosis Camden
- Publishers: NA: Psygnosis; EU: Sony Computer Entertainment
- Producer: Ron Festejo
- Designer: James Smith
- Programmers: Peter Marshall; Stewart Sargaison
- Artist: Scott Butler
- Composer: Alastair Lindsay
- Platform: PlayStation
- Release: NA: 28 September 1999; EU: 22 October 1999
- Genre: Action-adventure
- Mode: Single-player

Kingsley's Adventure is a 1999 action-adventure video game developed and published by Psygnosis for the PlayStation. It was released by Psygnosis' parent company Sony Computer Entertainment in Europe.

== Gameplay ==
Kingsley's Adventure is an action-adventure game in which Kingsley, an orphaned fox, wants to become a True Knight, like his father. The player, as Kingsley, must go to several places through foxholes to collect the weapons that will allow Kingsley to do so, helping people in distress, and defeating enemies and the Dark Knights along the way. Afterwards, the player must defeat the evil Bad Custard, who is responsible for turning other True Knights into the aforementioned Dark Knights.

Said weapons are an axe, a sword, a crossbow and a dagger. A shield can also be used to defend against attacks. The game is described as featuring five magic spells, but no spells can be cast by the player in the final release.

There are fifty characters that the player can interact with.

== Story ==
The story focuses on Kingsley, an orphaned fox who is adopted by the King and Queen of the Fruit Kingdom, who live in Carrot Castle. Kingsley's father was a True Knight of the Fruit Kingdom, so his goal is to become a True Knight like his father.

Meanwhile, a chef named Bad Custard is expelled from the Fruit Kingdom for a food poisoning incident and steals the Queen's Book of Magic to plot his revenge and take over the Fruit Kingdom. One by one, the four True Knights of the Fruit Kingdom approached Bad Custard to stop him, but with black magic, he transformed them into his own evil personal Dark Knights. Now Kingsley is the only one who can save the Fruit Kingdom.

The game starts with Kingsley being trained by Old Wrinkle, a badger who trained many knights in his time, who sets him into an obstacle course that tests his agility, combat, archery, and ability to solve puzzles. Old Wrinkle then gives Kingsley a dagger that was handed down to every trained apprentice after surpassing a squire. The King sends Kingsley to Sea Town, where Captain Gallagher the Scourge of the Seven Seas takes the town's trading galleon to force them to answer his and his master's (a crocodile named Rex, formerly Sir William the Frog Knight) demands. After defeating both of them, Kingsley is sent to Poorluck Village, where Snuff the Dragon is eating all of the food (except the spinach, since he hates it) in said place. Besides him, Kingsley must defeat Judas the bull (formerly Sir Rufus the Rabbit Knight), who is holding Snuff's leash. Afterward, Kingsley is sent to Rosary Village to solve a poisonous root beer problem caused by Clarence Darklord Jr., a demon bat who was plaguing the Abbey disguised as the so-called Novice Tim. Kingsley also must defeat Oscar the Condor (formerly Sir Gawain the Eagle Knight). Finally, Kingsley is sent to Aphasia to help the Fruit Kingdom's most beloved Sheep Wizard Cornflour regain his coat from a rat named Reggie. When the Wizard puts it back on, he summons a bridge so Kingsley can reach the castle in which Gustav the Polar Bear (formerly Sir Orson the Bear Knight) is located.

After obtaining the items, Kingsley becomes a True Knight. If all of the Dark Knights are defeated and changed back to their True Knight forms, Kingsley will be sent to Skull Island, where Bad Custard is keeping the Book of Magic. The final confrontation shows a battle between honor and greed, resulting in Bad Custard's demise into the boiling cauldron of Bad Magic and Kingsley regaining the Book.

After the credits, it is revealed that Kingsley himself was the puppeteer from the introductory puppet show, (hinting that he made it all up to make himself look like a hero) and tells the audience to keep his secret.

== Development ==
Kingsley's Adventure was developed by Psygnosis' studio at Camden Town. Peter Marshall was programmer for the game, and was joined by Ron Festejo as producer.

== Release ==
Kingsley's Adventure was released for the PlayStation in North America on September 28, 1999, and in Europe on October 22 of the same year. Upon release, it generated little attention and went unnoticed.

== Reception ==
Reception

Review scores
Publication	Score
AllGame	3.5/5
Consoles +	80%
Jeuxvideo.com	16/20
Joypad	5/10
M! Games	67%
Mega Fun	67/100
Player One	69%
Video Games (DE)	63%
Fun Generation	6/10
PlanetStation	3.5/5
Power Unlimited	8.5/10
Super Play	84/100

Kingsley's Adventure was met with a mixed reception from critics.
