= Discworld (video game) =

Point-and-click adventure video game

- The cover features work by Discworld novel cover artist Josh Kirby.
- Developers: Teeny Weeny Games; Perfect 10 Productions
- Publisher: Psygnosis
- Director: Gregg Barnett
- Producer: Angela Sutherland
- Designers: Gregg Barnett; David Johnston
- Programmers: Gregg Barnett; David Johnston
- Artists: Paul Mitchell; Simon Turner
- Writers: Gregg Barnett; Paul Kidd
- Composers: Mark Bandola; Rob Lord
- Engine: Tinsel
- Platforms: MS-DOS, Mac OS, PlayStation, Sega Saturn
- Release: MS-DOS: EU: 17 March 1995; NA: 1995; Mac OS: NA: 1995; PlayStation: NA: 1995; EU: 1995; Sega Saturn: EU: 15 August 1996; JP: 13 December 1996
- Genre: Adventure
- Mode: Single-player

Discworld is a point-and-click adventure game developed by Teeny Weeny Games and Perfect 10 Productions and published by Psygnosis. It is based on Terry Pratchett's novels of the same name. The player assumes the role of Rincewind the "wizzard", voiced by Eric Idle, as he becomes involved in exploring the Discworld and preventing a dragon from terrorising the city of Ankh-Morpork. The story borrows elements from several Discworld novels, with its central plot loosely based on the events in Guards! Guards!

Pratchett was originally reluctant to grant a licence for a game based on his novels after the commercial failure of a video game adaptation of The Colour of Magic in 1986. Gregg Barnett, the game's designer, managed to persuade the writer through offering, alongside an initial design concept, to faithfully recreate elements from the novels. As part of his desire to have a large adventure for CD-based computer systems and opening up a potential market for similar video games, he convinced Pratchett to create an original story that would offer a game based on the entire series rather than an adaptation of one book. Development included incorporating a British cast of comedians to voice several of the characters.

The game was originally released in 1995 for MS-DOS, Macintosh and PlayStation. A Sega Saturn version was released the following year. Discworld was more popular among European gamers than those in North America, with reviewers praising it for its humour, voice acting and graphics, but criticising its gameplay and difficult puzzles. A sequel, Discworld II: Missing Presumed...!?, was released in 1996.

== Gameplay ==
The patrician talking to Rincewind in Ankh-Morpork's palace

Discworld is a third-person point-and-click graphic adventure game. In each location, the player can examine and interact with people and objects. The player can also pick up and use items to acquire other objects or solve puzzles to remove obstacles. Conversations focus on Rincewind using one of four topics with characters: Greet; Sarcastic or Joking; Question; and Vent Anger. Extra topics may sometimes appear related to a subject that Rincewind learns during the course of the game. The player can interact with a variety of people, including the Archchancellor, Dibbler, the Librarian, and Death.

Discovered items can be stored in one of two inventories: Rincewind's pockets, which can hold only four items at a time; or in the Luggage. In order to progress the story, which is divided into four acts, Rincewind must find the correct items to advance, which requires visiting a multitude of locations. Some of the locations are near Ankh-Morpork, while others are outside the city and around the Discworld. All of these places can be accessed via an overworld map for each region whenever the player leaves a location to visit another (some become accessible when the player learns about them).

The PlayStation version is compatible with the PlayStation Mouse, as well as the standard PlayStation controller. The Japanese Sega Saturn version is also compatible with the Shuttle Mouse.

== Plot ==
A secret brotherhood summons a dragon from its native dimension to cause destruction and mayhem across the city of Ankh-Morpork. Rumours of the dragon's rampage across the city reach Unseen University. Since the Archchancellor wishes the involvement of at least one wizard in the matter, Rincewind is summoned to handle the problem. After obtaining a book to learn what is needed to track the dragon to its lair, Rincewind searches the city for the required components to assemble a dragon detector and brings them back to the Archchancellor. After the Archchancellor mentions that the dragon's lair is stocked with gold, Rincewind snatches the dragon detector from him, searches the city, finds the lair, and takes all the gold. Just before he leaves, the dragon stops him and requests his aid in removing the brotherhood's hold upon her, claiming they are using her for evil and are planning to make her go on a major rampage.

To do this, Rincewind is told to find out who they are, and recover a golden item from each, since these items are what they use to control the dragon. Learning that a book about summoning dragons had been stolen from the library at Unseen University the night before, Rincewind gains access to L-Space, allowing him to journey into the past, witness the theft, and follow the thief back to the brotherhood's hideout. After gaining entry in disguise, Rincewind learns that each member holds a role in the city – Chucky the Fool, the Thief, the Mason, the Chimney Sweep, the Fishmonger, and the Dunny King – and seeks to change the city so they can have a better future for themselves. Acquiring their golden items, Rincewind brings them to the dragon, only to learn it will not return to its dimension but seek revenge on the brotherhood before coming after him. Wishing to stop this, Rincewind decides to prevent the summoning book from being stolen, by switching it for one that makes love custard. In his efforts to be recognised for stopping the dragon, Rincewind gets into an argument with the Patrician over the existence of dragons, summoning the same one back to Discworld. An annoyed Patrician tasks Rincewind to deal with it.

Learning that a hero with a million-to-one chance can stop it, Rincewind searches for the right components to be the hero, journeying across the city, the Disc, and over the edge, to find the necessary items, including a sword which goes "ting", a birthmark, and a magic spell. With the components acquired, he returns to the city's square, where Lady Ramkin, the owner of a local dragon sanctuary, is tied to a rock to be sacrificed to the dragon. Despite having what is needed to combat the dragon, Rincewind fails to stop it, and so seeks out an alternative method. Taking a swamp dragon called Mambo the 16th, and feeding him hot coals and a lit firecracker, Rincewind tries again, but Mambo stops working when he becomes infatuated with the dragon. Rincewind then throws a love custard tart at the dragon. The dragon falls in love with Mambo, and the two fly off to perform mating dances. Rincewind heads to the pub for a pint to celebrate the end of his adventure.

== Development ==
Terry Pratchett was pleased with the 1986 interactive fiction game The Colour of Magic, but criticised its poor marketing. He was reluctant to grant Discworld licences due to concern for the series, and wanted a reputable company who cared about the property. Other video game companies had previously approached Pratchett seeking a licence. One such company was AdventureSoft, and their failure to obtain a Discworld licence led to the creation of Simon the Sorcerer, which took inspiration from the Discworld series of books.

When the creative director and designer Gregg Barnett sought out the Discworld licence, he intended to show Pratchett that he cared about Discworld instead of getting money. Barnett said in an interview that Pratchett was more invested in how the intellectual property would be treated than money. During negotiations, he offered to design the game before signing a deal; he did so, and Pratchett agreed. Gregg said the design showed respect for Discworld, and that was what persuaded Pratchett. This took roughly six months, and Pratchett was impressed with a demonstration of Rincewind using a broom to get the Luggage off the top of a wardrobe. Perfect 10 Productions created an engine, which was developed in a separate location to "keep the code clean". The dialogue was refined by Pratchett. The character design was based on Barnett giving his interpretation of characters to a designer who had worked for Disney. He stated that they "went a bit slapstick on it". The backdrops were painted manually and digitised.

Pratchett originally wanted the game to be based on The Colour of Magic and for the team to work in succession through the series. However, Barnett believed that would be detrimental, and thought it was difficult to make a game based on just one book. He also said in an interview that he was more interested in the Discworld itself than any particular book, and this was so the story would not be restricted to a narrative thereof. He explained that they wanted to licence all of Discworld. An original story was made, taking elements from various Discworld books, particularly The Colour of Magic and Guards! Guards!. Barnett stated that the team had "effectively written a complete film script for the game". The game introduced a new character: a practising psychiatrist (known as the psychatrickerist). Pratchett initially objected to this, but later added his input, and the character became a retro-phrenologist. Barnett stated that he wanted to create Discworld as a flagship game for CD-based systems, and thought the Discworld licence was "100% suited".

Barnett stated that he wanted to improve the British comedy by hiring voice actors with "British talent". John Cleese was his first choice for Rincewind, but he rejected the offer, saying that he did not do voices in games. Pratchett wanted Nicholas Lyndhurst for Rincewind because he was physically based on his Only Fools and Horses character. Eric Idle was cast as Rincewind, who was tweaked to make him more like Idle from Monty Python. Other voice actors include Tony Robinson, Kate Robbins (who voiced all female characters), Rob Brydon, and Jon Pertwee. Barnett wanted Christopher Lee as Death, but was unable to afford him. Brydon had already been recorded when he offered to voice Death. Barnett initially believed that Rowan Atkinson "would make a great Death". According to Barnett, they were all "friendly, professional, and funny", and Idle was recorded during day-long sessions in Los Angeles.

The concept art and background layouts were produced by Nick Martinelli, who, according to Barnett, was "an excellent art director from the animation industry". These were illustrated and coloured by a professional team. Barnett stated that he was "intimately involved" with the graphics in the concept stages and initial production, but later stepped back.

The game was originally due to be published by Sierra On-line. Their engine was obtained and worked on, but due to costs for another project, they cancelled all external development. An advert in Computer Trade Weekly attracted interest from companies such as Electronic Arts and Psygnosis. The latter approached Perfect 10 Productions and would not leave until a deal was signed. Psygnosis had offered Pratchett "a big cheque", which he refused. Discworld's engine was rewritten from scratch afterwards.

The game was officially announced by September 1993 and slated for a Christmas release the following year. It was released in 1995 for the PC, PlayStation, and Macintosh. The Saturn version was released in Europe on 15 August 1996, and in Japan on 13 December 1996.

The game was released on both floppy disk and CD-ROM, with the CD version featuring a fully voiced cast of characters. For the Japanese PlayStation and Saturn releases, all voice acting was redone by Japanese comedian Junji Takada, a major selling point for the game in Japan. A port was under way for the Philips CD-i in 1996, and had entered its final stages of development, but was never released. A 3DO Interactive Multiplayer version was announced to be in development and slated to be published by Psygnosis during E3 1995. However, this port was never released for unknown reasons. In an April 2020 online interview, former Perfect 10 Productions/Teeny Weeny Games member David Swan stated that Atari Corporation approached the company in regards to a potential conversion of Discworld for the Atari Jaguar CD. However, no actual development started on the port beyond discussion phase due to market issues and low install base of the platform. A Sega CD release was also advertised, but never published for unknown reasons.

== Reception ==
Reception

Aggregate score
Aggregator	Score
GameRankings	83% (PC)

Review scores
Publication	Score
Adventure Gamers	3.5/5
Computer Gaming World	3.5/5 (PC)
Electronic Gaming Monthly	8.5/10, 8.5/10, 8.5/10, 8.5/10 (PlayStation)
Famitsu	6/10, 4/10, 5/10, 6/10 (SS)
IGN	7.0/10 (PlayStation)
Joypad	91% (PlayStation)
Mean Machines Sega	76% (Saturn)
Next Generation	3/5
PC Gamer (UK)	89% (PC)
Sega Saturn Magazine	72% (Saturn)
Coming Soon Magazine	91% (PC)
Adventure Classic Gaming	4/5 (PC)
Génération 4	80% (Macintosh)
PC Games	B−

Discworld was a "massive hit" in Europe and the United Kingdom, according to director Gregg Barnett. However, the game was less successful in the United States. It received generally positive reviews. The humour and graphics in particular were widely praised, but some thought that the difficulty was too harsh. It tied for third place in Computer Game Review's 1995 "Adventure Game of the Year" award category. The editors noted its "good voice work" and "very nice animation", and praised its humour. In 1996, GamesMaster ranked Discworld 78th on their "Top 100 Games of All Time". In 1998, Saturn Power listed the game 91st in its Top 100 Sega Saturn Games.

Entertainment Weekly praised the voice acting of Eric Idle, but criticised the PlayStation version, saying that it was difficult to navigate without the PlayStation Mouse and the text was too small. In their review of the PlayStation version, Electronic Gaming Monthly similarly commented that the PlayStation mouse is required for full enjoyment, but highly praised the voice acting, humour, and graphics. Scary Larry of GamePro, in contrast to EW and EGM, said the standard joypad "works just as well" as the PlayStation Mouse. He praised the humorous graphics, extensive voice acting, and script which "will leave your sides aching from laughter", but found the gameplay too simplistic and lacking in challenge. He recommended it for players who were open to less serious gaming. IGN called Discworld challenging and long, but criticised the slow loading times. The reviewer of Joypad described the game as "very beautiful" and said that the PlayStation version has more colours than the PC version, but disliked the difficulty and the size of the save game files.

Sega Saturn Magazine cited overlong dialogues, poor graphics, and "largely non-existent" animation, but commended the variety of locations to visit and their mediaeval backdrops, and described the dialogue as "jokey" and "sarcastic". The magazine's Japanese namesake agreed with this assessment of "British" humour by describing it as ironic and amusing. Mean Machines Sega's reviewers believed the Saturn version had lost some authenticity, and thought that the gags were not funny, but commended the storyline.

Reviewing the PC version, Coming Soon Magazine's reviewer believed that the graphics are colourful and liked the humour, but criticised the way the dialogue was handled. David Tanguay of Adventure Classic Gaming described Discworld as "one of the funniest adventure games ever made", but recommended that players use a walkthrough. Computer Gaming World's Charles Ardai praised the humour and believed the writing was true to Pratchett. PC Gamer's reviewer praised the speech, believing it improved the humour, and also complimented the difficulty, saying the game cannot be completed within days. His criticisms included the overuse of dialogue in the first act, saying most of it is irrelevant to the story, and also thought the control system "falters in certain areas". He said that Discworld is "a worthy contender" to Sam & Max and challenged the hold LucasArts had on the point-and-click genre. The graphics and animation were criticised as "merely average" by Christopher Lindquist of PC Games, although he claimed that fans of Pratchett "won't mind" the game and described it as "A smart, funny--and long--gaming tribute" to the series. The Macintosh version was described by Génération 4 as "the gag of the year!"; the reviewer liked the humour and decoration, but criticised it for only being compatible with Motorola 68000-based systems. Adventure Gamers praised the voice acting, humour, graphics and story, calling it "a wonderful game", but noted that "it stops short of being a classic simply due to its sheer difficulty and the unwieldy nature". Adventure Gamers also called the music "serviceable at best, and fairly forgettable". In 2009, Eurogamer's Will Porter reviewed the game retrospectively, praising the cartoonish graphics and voice acting, but criticising its puzzles and noting that "Discworld commits every point-and-click crime you'd care to mention" (such as "obtuse puzzles"). The game was reviewed in 1995 in Dragon by David "Zeb" Cook in the final "Eye of the Monitor" column. Cook praised the "exceptional" animation and art, as well as the "faithful" conversion of Pratchett's work to a video game, but criticised the testing and quality control as "crappy". Next Generation recommended the game for fans of Douglas Adams or Monty Python.

Entertainment Weekly's Darren Franich in 2010 called the game an "underrated point-and-click gem", saying that it was one of the games he wanted on the PlayStation Network. In 2013, Retro Gamer cited Discworld as an example demonstrating British developers produced a disproportionately large number of overly hard video games.
