= Adidas Power Soccer International 97 =

1997 association football video game

- Developer: Psygnosis
- Publisher: Psygnosis
- Producer: Jean‑Baptiste Bolcato
- Platform: PlayStation
- Release: EU: 11 April 1997
- Genre: Sports
- Modes: Single-player, multiplayer

Adidas Power Soccer International 97 is a 1997 association football video game developed and published by Psygnosis for the PlayStation. The game is sponsored by German sportswear company Adidas, and the second title in the Adidas Power Soccer series.

== Gameplay ==
As with the previous title in the series the Arcade mode offers less realistic gameplay, allowing players to "kick, punch and handball and unleash the Super Power Predator shot", whereas the Simulation mode "is more for the footballing purist, incorporating offsides and the proper rules". A new addition to the series is a Tournament mode and the ability to select from one of 56 national teams. Up to four players are supported via the Multitap accessory. Commentary is provided by Brian Moore.

== Development ==
Lead development took place at Psygnosis' office in Paris, with Jean‑Baptiste Bolcato acting as producer on the title.

== Reception ==
Tom Sargent of Play magazine awarded the title 52%, dubbing it a "pseudo follow up to Adidas Power Soccer", noting its similarities to the previous game in terms of gameplay and presentation and comparing the game unfavourably to Soccer '97 on the same console. Official PlayStation Magazine reviewed the title similarly, giving a score of 5/10, bemoaning "chunky and dated graphics" and that it was "nigh-on identical" to the previous game. Dan Brookes of PlayStation Plus magazine wrote that "the overwhelming feeling is one of clumsiness, since the players never 'feel' right", pointing to Olympic Soccer as the best football title on the console.
