= Expert Pool =

1999 sports video game

- Developers: NA: Visual Sciences; EU: Psygnosis
- Publishers: NA: Psygnosis; EU: GT Interactive
- Platform: Microsoft Windows
- Release: NA: September 24, 1999; EU: 1999
- Genre: Sports
- Modes: Single-player, multiplayer

Expert Pool is a video game developed by Visual Sciences and Psygnosis and published by Psygnosis and GT Interactive for Windows on September 10, 1999. Designers were Alan Savage, David Radford, Peter Warden, Richard Airlie, and Mark Green.

The game has three levels. There are three options: Local Multiplay, a LAN option and Internet play. This simulation and sports game is set in 13 pool/snooker venues such as biker bars, in Las Vegas. There are 198 opponents, such as biker-clad MC gangs.

== Reception ==
Reception

Aggregate score
| Aggregator | Score |
|---|---|
| GameRankings | 72% |

Review scores
| Publication | Score |
|---|---|
| AllGame | 3/5 |
| Computer Games Strategy Plus | 4/5 |
| GamePro | 3.5/5 |
| GameSpot | 7.8/10 |
| IGN | 8.3/10 |
| PC Accelerator | 7/10 |
| PC Gamer (UK) | 61% |
| PC Gamer (US) | 64% |
| PC Zone | 58% |

The game received average reviews according to the review aggregation website GameRankings.

Upon its release, Stephen Poole of GameSpotReview wrote: "the days of Virtual Pool being the only shark in a small pond are over. Expert Pool might not live up to all the advertising baloney on the back of the box, and it's missing a couple of the features found in the Virtual Pool games. But when it comes to re-creating the experience of playing pool and giving you plenty of ways to do it - 19 different game types and a full suite of multiplayer connection options - Expert Pool delivers the goods."
