= Barbarian II =

1991 video game

- Developer: Psygnosis
- Publisher: Psygnosis
- Designer: Mike Chilton
- Platforms: Amiga, Atari ST
- Release: 1991
- Genre: Action-adventure
- Mode: Single-player

Barbarian II is a 1991 fantasy action-adventure game by British publisher Psygnosis for the Atari ST and Amiga. A sequel to 1987's Barbarian, the player takes on the role of Hegor on a quest to destroy his resilient and nefarious brother, the sorcerer Necron.

== Plot ==
Upon returning home at the end of Barbarian and having defeated his evil brother Necron, the High Council decreed that Hegor was not exactly the right person to take the reward of kingship. They inform him the position would demand much work on his part, and thus convince him to instead take a significant sum of gold as his reward. However, Hegor was never very good with numbers, and before long he soon finds himself broke again and looking for ways to pay for his wine and women. Whilst in the busy hamlet of Thelston he encounters a woman thief who claims she saw the barbarian seemingly defeat his brother, except after Hegor left Necron's remaining minions came along, retrieved their master's body and set about resurrecting him. Taking up arms, Hegor races to again face the challenges ahead, avenge his father's death and put an end to his brother's insidious activities once and for all.

== Gameplay ==
The game takes place from a side-on view, and Hegor moves between areas across the six regions, including forests, caves and temples. Hegor's primary weapons are his broadsword and bow, but he can attain other weapons including a shortsword and axe. Running and jumping comprises a large part of the gameplay, and in particular some of the later levels are extensive and require significant exploration.

== Reception ==
The One gave the Amiga version of Barbarian II an overall score of 80%, expressing that it pales in comparison to its predecessor, stating that "Barbarian II has much to recommend it initially, but with too few levels and similar gameplay throughout, the appeal soon wears off - especially when you compare it to the original Barbarian". The One praised Barbarian II's graphics, calling them "well animated and colourful" and the backgrounds "well-drawn and detailed", as well as complimenting its "atmospheric" music. The One praised Barbarian II's difficulty scaling, and expressed that the controls for Barbarian II are more intuitive than its predecessor. The One concludes their review by calling Barbarian II "a simplistic bundle of fun for those who like their hack and slash unadulterated".
