= Microcosm (video game) =

1993 video game

- Amiga CD cover art
- Developer: Psygnosis
- Publisher: Psygnosis
- Designer: Richard Browne
- Programmer: John Gibson
- Artists: Jim Bowers; Neil Thompson
- Writer: Nik Wild
- Composers: Rick Wakeman; Tim Wright; Mike Clarke; Kevin Collier; Pearl Studios
- Platforms: FM Towns, Sega CD, 3DO, Amiga CD32, MS-DOS
- Release: March 1993: FM Towns; JP: March 1993 Sega CD; NA: December 22, 1993; EU: January 1994 3DO; NA: March 14, 1994 Amiga CD32; EU: 1994 DOS; EU: 1994
- Genre: Rail shooter
- Mode: Single-player

Microcosm is a 3D rail shooter video game developed and published by Psygnosis in 1993. It was originally developed for the FM Towns, and ported for the Sega CD, Amiga CD32, 3DO, and MS-DOS. Microcosm featured realistic FMV animation, with the graphics being rendered on Silicon Graphics workstations. The game is either in first-person or third-person view depending on the gaming system.

== Plot ==
Set in the year of 2051 AD, the game takes place in a dystopian futuristic setting on an alien planet called Bodor, located in the Bator System, where the galaxy's two largest conglomerates—Cybertech, considered the more compassionate of the two, and Axiom, thought to be the more oppressive corporation—compete to achieve premier status in the business world, a position known as CORP 1. Because of heavy mining operations on the planet from the corporations, most of Bodor is uninhabitable due to pollution, forcing 87% of the population onto 2% of the planet's land. Because of this, poverty, crime and disease are rampant in the cities. Axiom also claims that Cybertech is responsible for the death of Axiom's former president. Axiom injects Cybertech president Tiron Korsby's body with microscopic droids designed to penetrate his brain and control his mind. Cybertech, however, learns of this plan and injects Korsby with their own piloted submarines shrunken down to a microscopic size to destroy Axiom's droids and prevent them from controlling Korsby's mind.

== Development ==
The game used the latest Silicon Graphics computers at the time to render the graphics as realistically as possible. In 1991, the game was first seen in a demo for the Amiga CDTV. A port for the CD-i was planned and then canceled, but a prototype exists. The lead platform was the FM Towns, and development was funded in part by Fujitsu with the aim of making it a launch title for the console-styled version of the platform, the FM Towns Marty. The game engine was later purchased by Fujitsu for £250,000.

The DOS and FM Towns versions feature a soundtrack by Rick Wakeman, which plays only in the credits because the compression techniques needed to simultaneously play CD-quality audio and stream graphics from CD had yet to be invented. For the later versions, in-house Psygnosis composer Tim Wright recorded a soundtrack which could play during gameplay. A promotional version of the game was later developed for Pfizer.

== Reception ==
Reception

Review scores
Publication	Score
Amiga Format	87% (CD32)
Amiga Power	44% (CD32)
Electronic Gaming Monthly	5.4/10 (Sega CD); 4/10 (3DO)
Hyper	83% (Sega CD)
Next Generation	2/5 (3DO)
CU Amiga	86% (CD32)
Power Unlimited	85% (CD32)

Critics generally rated Microcosm as having excellent graphics but very limited and poorly designed gameplay. Amiga Format, for instance, greatly praised the Amiga CD32 version's graphics and soundtrack, but described the gameplay as "a merely slightly better than average" rail shooter. In a 1995 second review, they lowered their score from 87% to 40%, mocking their earlier review's emphasis of graphics over gameplay and describing the game as "a decidedly average Space Harrier clone that certainly looks great, but plays horribly". Amiga Power similarly described Microcosm as a Space Harrier clone with extremely limited interactivity and little variations in the visuals. CU Amiga said that the graphics in the Amiga CD32 version are not nearly as good as the FM Towns version, with enemy sprites that look "pasted on", but that the gameplay is considerably improved. Power Unlimited reviewed the Amiga CD32 version and gave a score of 85%, summarizing: "One of the first video games with computer images that are on par with film images. However, ignore the eye-catching graphics and what remains is a very simple shooting game."

Reviewing the Sega CD version, GamePro opined that Microcosm represents a good concept for FMV games, but that the poor level design reduces the gameplay to trial-and-error and takes away the fun. Electronic Gaming Monthly similarly commented that the game concept is good, but the gameplay is "repetitious and boring".

Computer Gaming World in June 1994 said that the DOS version was "a very basic shooter" with "simplistic, even brainless" gameplay. While praising the "polished graphics and animation" and "equally excellent" music, the magazine concluded that despite "cool technology and a 'cinematic feel' ... Psygnosis forgot to make a game".

Electronic Gaming Monthly's four reviewers gave the 3DO version a unanimous score of 4 out of 10, commenting that the graphics are a huge improvement over the Sega CD version, (Note: Though the FM Towns and Amiga CD32 versions had also been released at the time, the review does not mention them because they were not released in North America, where Electronic Gaming Monthly was published.) but that the gameplay is still shallow and "just not fun". Next Generation stated that "This is one of those games one can never describe as challenging, only as frustrating."

James V. Trunzo reviewed Microcosm in White Wolf Inphobia #51 (Jan., 1995), rating it a 4 out of 5 and stated that "If Psygnosis falls short with Hexx, it makes up for it with Microcosm. The basic idea of using the inside of the human body as a battle ground has always been intriguing. It's certainly better than having to fight orcs and goblins all the time. Psygnosis makes excellent use of cinematics to enhance the gaming experience and avoids making Microcosm just another example of CD-ROM 'eye-candy'."

According to a Psygnosis spokesperson, despite the poor reviews Microcosm was a commercial success.

== Editions ==
The limited edition copy of the PC and Amiga CD32 versions of the game contains the game, the manual, a soundtrack CD and a T-shirt.
