= Overboard! (1997 video game) =

1997 video game

- Developer: Psygnosis
- Publisher: Psygnosis
- Platforms: PlayStation, Windows
- Release: PlayStation: EU: 24 October 1997; NA: 28 October 1997; Windows: NA: 19 November 1997; UK: 21 November 1997
- Genre: Action
- Modes: Single-player, multiplayer

Overboard! (Shipwreckers! in North America) is a top-down adventure game, released by Psygnosis for the PlayStation and Microsoft Windows in 1997. It employs a light-hearted, all-ages piratical theme. A relatively low-key release for Psygnosis, the game was met with mixed reviews.

== Gameplay ==
The player controls a pirate ship, shown to be crewed by three pirates in cutscenes. In gameplay, when the ship catches on fire the pirates jump overboard until the lifebar becomes empty.

The game is sometimes referred to as a strategy game, but it is primarily an adventure game. Overboard! also features a multiplayer mode for up to five players (requires the multitap adapter) in which the opponents compete to sink other players’ ships.

== Development ==
The game was showcased at E3 1997. The original soundtrack for the game was composed by Stuart Duffield.

== Reception ==
Reception

Aggregate score
Aggregator	Score
GameRankings	66% (PS)

Review scores
Publication	Score
Electronic Gaming Monthly	6.25/10 (PS)
GameSpot	6.4/10 (PC); 6/10 (PS)
IGN	6/10 (PS)
Next Generation	3/5 (PS)
The Sydney Morning Herald	4/5

Overboard! received mixed reviews, with its release during a holiday season crowded with highly-rated big budget titles working against it. Next Generation stated that "Ultimately, Shipwreckers! is a fun, quirky title with occasional moments of brilliance. However, with so many other great games out right now, it falls a little short of the mark." Similarly, IGN concluded that "Shipwreckers! isn't a bad game. The control is solid and the graphics clean, if a bit dated. But with so many other great games out this holiday season (many of them from Psygnosis, actually) there's just no reason to blow $50 on this one."

On the more positive side, GamePro, while unimpressed by the graphics and sound, recommended the game based on the change of pace offered by its unique gameplay. Critics overwhelmingly praised the originality of the game's design, though Shawn Smith of Electronic Gaming Monthly (EGM) said it was similar to, and inferior to, the 1993 game The Lost Vikings, and GameSpot compared it unfavorably to Sid Meier's Pirates!. GameSpot nonetheless deemed it solid enough to be worth buying, though their separate review for the PlayStation version was negative, saying the lack of variety and depth in the gameplay makes it grow old over the course of the single-player campaign, a criticism shared by a number of reviewers. However, some reviewers said that the multiplayer mode is the game's strong point, turning it into an intense and addictive party game.

Though the graphics as a whole met a mixed response, most critics admitted to being impressed with the transparency effects on the water. Reviewers for both GamePro and EGM found the music annoying and run-of-the-mill, though like GamePro, Kraig Kujawa and Shawn Smith both recommended the game, with Kujawa calling it "a cute and original game whose simple play mechanics make it very appealing." Their co-reviewers Crispin Boyer and Kelly Rickards were less enthusiastic, saying that the multiplayer mode makes it worth getting but players should not expect enjoyment out of the single-player mode.
