= Adidas Power Soccer 98 =

1998 video game

- Developer: Shen Technologies SARL
- Publisher: Psygnosis
- Platforms: PlayStation, Microsoft Windows
- Release: EU: June 1998; NA: June 1998 (PS)
- Genre: Sports
- Modes: Single-player, multiplayer

Adidas Power Soccer 98 is a sports video game developed by Shen, published by Psygnosis, and sponsored by German sportswear company Adidas. It was released for PlayStation and Microsoft Windows in 1998.

== Reception ==
Reception

Aggregate score
Aggregator	Score
GameRankings	48%

Review scores
Publication	Score
Electronic Gaming Monthly	3.875/10
Game Informer	2/10
GameSpot	5.8/10
GameStar	48%
Hyper	65%
PlayStation Official Magazine – UK	5/10
Official U.S. PlayStation Magazine	3/5 stars
PC Games (DE)	30%

The PlayStation version received unfavorable reviews according to the review aggregation website GameRankings.
