= Wavertree Technology Park =

Technology and business park in Liverpool, England

Coordinates: 53.4042°N 2.9264°W

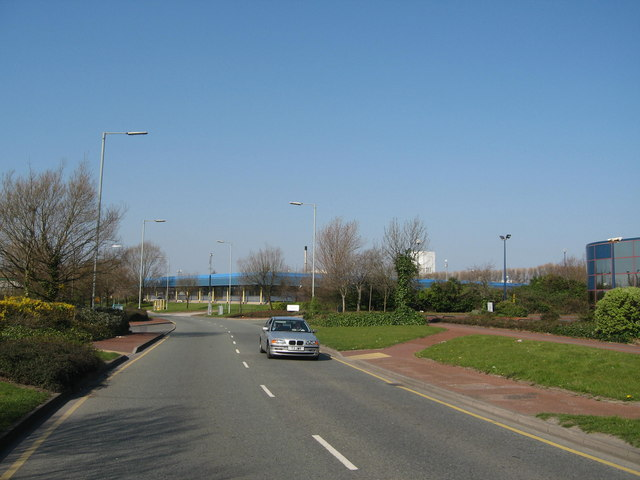

- Location within Merseyside
- OS grid reference: SJ3889
- Metropolitan borough: Liverpool
- Metropolitan county: Merseyside
- Region: North West
- Country: England
- Sovereign state: United Kingdom
- Post town: LIVERPOOL
- Postcode district: L15
- Dialling code: 0151
- Police: Merseyside
- Fire: Merseyside
- Ambulance: North West
- UK Parliament: Liverpool Wavertree

Wavertree Technology Park is a technology park in the Wavertree area of Liverpool, England between the city centre and the M62 motorway. It comprises single storey parades of pavilion-style office units.

The park is served by Wavertree Technology Park railway station, which opened in 2000.
