= Ian Hetherington =

British businessman (1952–2021)

- Hetherington in 1990
- Born: 28 June 1952
- Died: 14 December 2021 (aged 69)
- Occupations: Businessman and programmer, founder of Psygnosis

Ian Hetherington (28 June 1952 – 14 December 2021) was a British businessman who co-founded video games developer Psygnosis.

== Biography ==
He was a co-founder of Psygnosis, a company that developed video games. Along with Jonathan Ellis, Hetherington founded Psygnosis following the collapse of Imagine Software where Hetherington was the Financial Director. Based in Liverpool, Psygnosis's team was responsible for publishing such games as Shadow of the Beast, Wipeout, and Lemmings.

Psygnosis was later acquired by Sony in 1993 to work on the PlayStation console. The name Psygnosis eventually became defunct, and the company became known as Studio Liverpool. Multiple sequels to many of Psygnosis's games were released, including a PSP release of Wipeout, called Wipeout Pure. Hetherington left Psygnosis in 1998.

Hetherington was also Chairman of Evolution Studios and Realtime Worlds. He counted racing Ferraris in club events as his hobby.

He died on 14 December 2021, at the age of 69. Psygnosis co-founder Jonathan Ellis paid tribute on social media.
