= List of golf video games =

This is a list of golf-simulation video games ordered by release year.

== Franchises ==
- Actua Golf
- Birdie King
- Everybody's Golf (Hot Shots Golf)
- Famicom Golf (Golf)
- Golden Tee Golf (Golden Tee Live | Golden Tee PGA Tour)
- Jack Nicklaus
- Leader Board
- Links
- Mario Golf
- PGA Tour (Tiger Woods PGA Tour)
- Wii Sports

== Games ==
Title	Release date	Platform	Developer	Publisher
Computer Golf!	1978	Magnavox Odyssey 2	Magnavox	Magnavox
Pro Golf 1	1979	Apple II	Jim Wells	Softape
Golf	1980	Atari 2600	Atari, Inc.	Atari, Inc.
PGA Golf	1980	Intellivision	APh	Mattel Electronics
Real Golf Game (リアルゴルフゲーム)	1982	PC-6001	T&E Soft	T&E Soft
3-D Golf Simulation (3Dゴルフシミュレーション)	1982	FM-7, MSX, PC-6001, PC-8801	T&E Soft	T&E Soft
Champion Golf	1983	SG-1000	Logitec, Sega	Sega
3D Golf Simulation Part 2 (3Dゴルフシミュレーション Part 2)	1984	PC-8801	T&E Soft	T&E Soft
3-D Golf Simulation - High-Speed Edition (3Dゴルフシミュレーション・高速版)	1984	MSX	T&E Soft	T&E Soft
Golf	Japan: 1984; US/UK: 1985	NES; PC-88; Game Boy; FDS e-Reader; GameCube (Animal Crossing game)	Nintendo R&D2 HAL Laboratory	Nintendo
3-D Golf Simulation Super Version (3Dゴルフシミュレーション スーパーバージョン)	1985	PC-6001 mkII	T&E Soft	T&E Soft
Golf's Best: St. Andrews - The Home of Golf	1986	Apple II, Commodore 64, MS-DOS		1 Step Software
Leaderboard	1986	Commodore 64/128, Atari 8-bit, Amstrad CPC, Amstrad PCW, ZX Spectrum, Amiga, Atari ST, Apple II, MS-DOS, Mac OS, Master System, Game Gear, Genesis/Mega Drive, Acorn Archimedes	Access Software	Access Software
Mean 18	1986	MS-DOS, Amiga, Apple IIGS, Atari 7800, Atari ST, Macintosh	Microsmiths	Accolade Atari Corporation
World Tour Golf	1986	Commodore 64, Amiga, Apple IIGS, MS-DOS	Evan Robinson Nicky Robinson Paul Reiche III	Electronic Arts
World Class Leader Board	1987	Acorn Archimedes, Amiga, Amstrad CPC, Apple II, Atari ST, Commodore 64, Macintosh, Master System, Game Gear, Sega Genesis, ZX Spectrum	Access Software	Access Software
Chip Shot: Super Pro Golf	1987	Intellivision	Realtime Associates, Inc.	INTV Corp.
The Golf	1988	MSX	Pack-In-Video	Pack-In-Video
Lee Trevino's Fighting Golf	1988	NES; Arcade	SNK	SNK
Zany Golf	1988	Amiga; Apple IIGS; Atari ST; MS-DOS; Mega Drive	Sandcastle Productions	Electronic Arts
Jack Nicklaus' Greatest 18 Holes of Major Championship Golf	1988	Amiga, Amstrad CPC, Apple IIGS, Atari ST, C64, Game Boy, MS-DOS, Mac, MSX, NES, PC-88, X68000, TurboGrafx-16	Sculptured Software Beam Software	Accolade, Konami (NES), Tradewest (Game Boy), Victor Entertainment (X68000, zMSX2)
Arnold Palmer Tournament Golf	1989	Sega Genesis	Sega	Sega
Bandai Golf Challenge Pebble Beach	1989	NES	TOSE	Bandai
Ganbare Golf Boys	1989	TurboGrafx-16	Klon AKA Dual Corporation	NCS Corporation
Golden Tee Golf	1989	Arcade, PlayStation, iOS(2015), Windows, Android	Incredible Technologies	Incredible Technologies
Naxat Open	1989	TurboGrafx-16	TOSE	Naxat Soft
New 3D Golf Simulation: Harukanaru Augusta (遥かなるオーガスタ)	1989	PC-98, FM Towns, X68000, Super Famicom, Mega Drive	T&E Soft	T&E Soft
Power Golf	1989	TurboGrafx-16	Hudson Soft	Hudson Soft
Super Albatross	1989	TurboGrafx-16	Laser Soft	Telenet Japan
Super Masters	1989	Arcade (Sega System 24)	Sega	Sega
Winning Shot	1989	TurboGrafx-16	Data East	Data East
Jack Nicklaus' Unlimited Golf & Course Design	June 1990	Amiga, MS-DOS, Super NES	Sculptured Software	Accolade
Greg Norman's Shark Attack!: The Ultimate Golf Simulator	1990	Amiga, Atari ST	Gremlin Graphics	Gremlin Graphics
Ninja Golf	1990	Atari 7800	BlueSky Software	Atari Corporation
PGA Tour Golf	1990	MS-DOS, Sega Genesis, Amiga, Macintosh, Super NES, Master System, Game Gear	Sterling Silver Software	Electronic Arts / Tengen
Links: The Challenge of Golf	1990	MS-DOS, Amiga, Sega CD	Access Software Papyrus (Sega CD)	Access SoftwareU.S. GoldVirgin (Sega CD)
Awesome Golf	1991	Atari Lynx	HandMade Software	Atari Corporation
Dynamic Country Club (ダイナミックカントリークラブ)	1991	Arcade (Sega System 24), Mega-CD	Sega AM3 R&D Division	Sega Enterprises
Golf Grand Slam	1991	NES	Tose	HectAtlus
Hal's Hole in One Golf	1991	Super NES	HAL Laboratory	HAL Laboratory
MicroProse Golf	1991	Amiga, Atari ST	The Thought Train	MicroProse
NES Open Tournament Golf	Japan: September 20, 1991; North America: September 29, 1991; Europe: June 18, 1992	NES, Famicom Disk System, Arcade (PlayChoice-10)	Nintendo R&D2	Nintendo
New 3D Golf Simulation: Harukanaru Augusta HD (遥かなるオーガスタHD)	1991	PC-98	T&E Soft	T&E Soft
True Golf Classics: Waialae Country Club	November 1991 (US); September 18, 1992 (Japan)	Super NES, NEC PC-9801	T&E Soft	T&E Soft
David Leadbetter's Greens	1992	MS-DOS	MicroProse	MicroProse
Devil's Course (Wicked 18) (デビルズコース)	1992	PC-98, Super Famicom, Super NES, Mega Drive, 3DO	T&E Soft	T&E Soft
Greg Norman's Golf Power	1992	NES	Gremlin Interactive	Virgin Interactive
Jack Nicklaus Golf & Course Design: Signature Edition	1992	MS-DOS	Sculptured Software	Accolade
Links 386 Pro	1992	MS-DOS	Access	Access
Nick Faldo's Championship Golf	1992	Amiga	Grandslam	Grandslam
Pebble Beach no Hatou (Pebble Beach Golf Links) (ペブルビーチの波涛)	1992	PC-98, Super Famicom, Super NES, Mega Drive, 3DO, Saturn	T&E Soft	T&E Soft
PGA Tour Golf II	1992 (Mega Drive) / 1995 (Game Gear)	Mega Drive; Game Gear	Polygon Games	Electronic Arts (Mega Drive) / Time Warner Interactive (Game Gear)
Top Pro Golf (トッププロゴルフ)	1992	Mega Drive	Soft Machine	Soft Vision
Chi Chi's Pro Challenge Golf (トッププロゴルフ)	1993	Genesis	Soft Vision	Japan: Soft Vision US: Virgin Games
Jack Nicklaus' Power Challenge Golf	1993	Genesis	Microsmiths Inc.	Accolade
Mezase! Top Pro: Green ni Kakeru Yume	1993	NES	Tose	Jaleco
Masters: Harukanaru Augusta 2 (マスターズ 遙かなるオーガスタ2)	1993	Super Famicom, PC-98	T&E Soft	T&E Soft
Masters New: Harukanaru Augusta 3 (マスターズ NEW 遙かなるオーガスタ3	1993	3DO, Saturn, Super Famicom	T&E Soft	T&E Soft
PGA European Tour	1994	Amiga, Amiga CD32, Game Boy, Sega Genesis, Super Nintendo	Polygames	EA Sports
PGA Tour Golf III	1994	Mega Drive	Polygon Games	EA Sports
PGA Tour Golf 486	1994	MS-DOS	EA Sports	EA Sports
Power Golf 2: Golfer	1994	TurboGrafx-16	Hudson Soft	Hudson Soft
Golf Magazine: 36 Great Holes Starring Fred Couples	1995	32X	Flashpoint Productions	Sega
Sensible Golf	1995	Amiga	Virgin Interactive	Virgin Interactive
St Andrews: Eikō to Rekishi no Old Course	Japan: September 15, 1995	Super NES		Epoch
Golf (T&E Virtual Golf) (T&E ヴァーチャルゴルフ)	August 11, 1995	Virtual Boy	Technology and Entertainment Software	Japan: T&E Soft; US: Nintendo
The Hyper Golf: Devil's Course (Valora Valley Golf) (ザ・ハイパーゴルフ デビルズコース)	1995	Saturn	Technology and Entertainment Software	Technology and Entertainment Software
PGA Tour 96	1995 (Mega Drive) / January 1996 (Super NES) / September 1995 (PlayStation)	Mega Drive; Super NES; Game Gear; Game Boy; 3DO; PlayStation	NuFX (Mega Drive) / Halestorm (Super NES) / EA Sports (PlayStation)	EA Sports (Mega Drive) / Black Pearl Software (Super NES) / Electronic Arts Victor (PlayStation)
Peter Jacobsen's Golden Tee 3D Golf	September 1995	Arcade, PlayStation, Windows	Incredible Technologies	Incredible Technologies / Infogrames (PlayStation)
Neo Turf Masters	January 1996	Arcade Neo-Geo MVS; Console Neo-Geo AES, Neo-Geo CD	Nazca	SNK
Pebble Beach - The Great Shot グレートショット ～ペブルビーチ～	1996	Arcade (Sega ST-V)	Technology and Entertainment Software	Technology and Entertainment Software
Eikō no Saint Andrews (栄光のセントアンドリュース)	Japan: November 29, 1996 (N64) / Japan: August 28, 1997 (PS)	Nintendo 64; PlayStation	SETA Corporation	SETA Corporation (N64) / Shogakukan (PS)
Pebble Beach no Hatou NEW: Tournament Edition (ペブルビーチの波濤 NEW トーナメント・エディション)	1996	Super Famicom	Technology and Entertainment Software	Technology and Entertainment Software
Masters New: Shin Harukanaru Augusta (マスターズ 新・遥かなるオーガスタ)	1996	PlayStation	Technology and Entertainment Software	Technology and Entertainment Software
Pebble Beach no Hatou Plus (ペブルビーチの波濤PLUS)	1996	PlayStation	Technology and Entertainment Software	Technology and Entertainment Software
Links LS 1997	1996	MS-DOS	Access Software	Access Software
SimGolf	1996	Windows	Maxis	Maxis
Front Page Sports: Golf	1997	Windows	Headgate Studios	Sierra On-Line
Jack Nicklaus 4	1997	Windows	Cinematronics	Accolade
Links LS 1998	1997	Windows	Access Software	Access Software
PGA Tour Pro	1997	Windows	EA Sports	Electronic Arts
British Open Championship Golf	April 21, 1997	Windows	LookingGlass Technologies	LookingGlass Technologies
Everybody's Golf; Hot Shots Golf	Japan: July 7, 1997; US/UK: April 30, 1998	PlayStation	Camelot Software Planning	Sony Computer Entertainment
Jack Nicklaus 5	November 1997	Windows	Eclipse Entertainment	Accolade
Waialae no Kiseki: Extra 36 Holes (ワイアラエの奇蹟 Extra 36 Holes)	1997	Saturn	T&E Soft	T&E Soft
Jun Classic C.C. & Rope Club (ジュンクラシック&ロペ倶楽部)	1997	Saturn, PlayStation	T&E Soft	T&E Soft
Masters '98: Haruka Naru Augusta	Japan: December 26, 1997	Nintendo 64	T&E Soft	T&E Soft
PGA Tour Gold	1998	Windows	EA Sports	Electronic Arts
The Golf Pro	1998	Windows	Empire Interactive	Empire Interactive
Microsoft Golf 1998 Edition	May 1998	Windows	Friendly Software	Microsoft
Waialae Country Club: True Golf Classics	NA: July 29, 1998; PAL: Aug. 24, 1998	Nintendo 64	T&E Soft	Nintendo
Tiger Woods 99	August 31, 1998	PC	EA Sports	EA Sports
Links LS 1999	October 31, 1998	PC	Access	Access
Tiger Woods 99 PGA Tour Golf	October 31, 1998	PlayStation	EA Sports	Electronic Arts
Microsoft Golf 1999 Edition	Late 1998	Windows	Friendly Software	Microsoft
Beavis and Butt-Head: Bunghole in One	December 23, 1998	Windows	Illusions Gaming Company	GT Interactive
Jack Nicklaus 6: Golden Bear Challenge	March 1999	Windows	Hypnos Entertainment	Activision
Pro 18 World Tour Golf	March 1999	PlayStation; Windows	Intelligent Games	Psygnosis
Links Extreme	May 27, 1999	Windows	Access	Microsoft
PGA Championship Golf 1999 Edition	Late May 1999	Windows	Headgate Studios	Sierra Sports
Mario Golf	June 11, 1999	Nintendo 64; Game Boy Color	Camelot Software Planning	Nintendo
Everybody's Golf 2 Hot Shots Golf 2	July 29, 1999	PlayStation	Clap Hanz	Sony Computer Entertainment
CyberTiger	September 30, 1999	PlayStation; Game Boy Color; Nintendo 64	EA Sports	EA Sports
Harukanaru Augusta for Windows (遙かなるオーガスタfor Windows)	1999	Windows	T&E Soft	T&E Soft
Links LS 2000	October 1999	Windows; Macintosh	Access	Microsoft
Golf Daisuki!	October 29, 1999	Game Boy Color	KID	KID
Tiger Woods 2000	November 24, 1999	Game Boy Color	THQ	THQ
Tiger Woods PGA Tour 2000	November 30, 1999	Windows; PlayStation	EA Sports	Electronic Arts
Tee Off(Golf Shiyouyo)	December 9, 1999	Dreamcast	Bottom Up	Acclaim
Golden Tee Fore!	2000	Arcade	Incredible Technologies	Incredible Technologies
Nippon Pro Golf Tour 64	May 2, 2000	64DD	Media Factory	Randnet
PGA Championship Golf 2000	June 2000	Windows	Headgate Studios	Sierra Sports
Microsoft Golf 2001 Edition	August 24, 2000	Windows	Microsoft	Microsoft
Links 2001	October 2000	Windows	Microsoft	Microsoft
Nettou Golf	October 19, 2000	Dreamcast	Sega	Sega
Swing Away Golf (Golf Paradise) (Golf Paradise DX)	October 25, 2000	PlayStation 2	T&E Soft	Electronic Arts
Links LS Classic	November 2000	Windows	Access	Microsoft
Tiger Woods PGA Tour 2001	November 6, 2000	Windows; PlayStation 2 PlayStation	Headgate	EA Sports
Golf Shiyouyo 2: Aratanaru Chousen	January 25, 2001	Dreamcast	SoftMax	SoftMax
ESPN Final Round Golf 2002	March 21, 2001	Game Boy Advance	Konami Nagoya	Konami
Mr. Golf	May 17, 2001	PlayStation 2	Artdink	Midas Interactive Entertainment
Everybody's Golf 3 Hot Shots Golf 3	July 26, 2001	PlayStation 2	Clap Hanz	Sony Computer Entertainment
Sid Meier's SimGolf	January 23, 2002	Windows	Firaxis and Maxis	EA Games
Tiger Woods PGA Tour 2002	February 24, 2002	Windows; PlayStation 2	Headgate	EA Sports
Tiger Woods PGA Tour Golf	May 29, 2002	Game Boy Advance	Destination Software	Destination Software
Outlaw Golf	June 10, 2002	Windows; PlayStation 2 Xbox; GameCube	Simon & Schuster Interactive	Simon & Schuster Interactive
Street Golfer (Simple 2000 Ultimate Vol. 12: Street Golfer)	Japan: June 27, 2002; Europe: March 2006	PlayStation 2	Polygon Magic, Inc.	Japan: D3Publisher; Europe: 505 Game Street
Links 2003	September 2002	Windows	Microsoft	Microsoft Game Studios
Disney Golf (Disney Golf Classic) ディズニーゴルフ クラシック)	October 16, 2002	PlayStation 2	T&E Soft	Electronic Arts
Swingerz Golf; Ace Golf; Wai Wai Golf	October 23, 2002	GameCube	Telenet Japan	Eidos Interactive
Tiger Woods PGA Tour 2003	October 27, 2002	Windows; PlayStation 2 GameCube; Macintosh	EA Sports	Electronic Arts
Mario Golf: Toadstool Tour; Mario Golf Family Tour マリオゴルフ ファミリーツアー	July 29, 2003	GameCube	Camelot Software Planning	Nintendo
Tiger Woods PGA Tour 2004	September 22, 2003	PC; PlayStation 2 Xbox; GameCube; Game Boy Advance; N-Gage; Mobile phone	Headgate	EA Sports
Links 2004	November 11, 2003	Xbox	Microsoft Game Studios	Microsoft Game Studios
Everybody's Golf 4	November 27, 2003	PlayStation 2	Clap Hanz	Sony Computer Entertainment
Ribbit King	July 11, 2003	GameCube; PlayStation 2	Jamsworks	Bandai
Mario Golf: Advance Tour	June 22, 2004	Game Boy Advance	Camelot Software Planning	Nintendo
Tiger Woods PGA Tour 2005	September 20, 2004	Windows; PlayStation 2 Xbox; GameCube; Nintendo DS; Mobile phone	Headgate Studios	EA Sports
Outlaw Golf 2	November 25, 2004	PlayStation 2 Xbox	Hypnotix	Global Star
Everybody's Golf Portable	December 12, 2004	PlayStation Portable	Clap Hanz	Sony Computer Entertainment
Golden Tee Live	2005	Arcade	Incredible Technologies	Incredible Technologies
Pangya	2005	Windows	Ntreev Soft	Several
Tiger Woods PGA Tour 06	September 20, 2005	Windows; PlayStation 2 PlayStation Portable; Xbox; Xbox 360; GameCube; Mobile phone	EA Sports	EA Sports
True Swing Golf (Nintendo Touch Golf)	November 10, 2005	Nintendo DS	T&E Soft	Nintendo
Leaderboard Golf	2006	Windows; PlayStation 2	Aqua Pacific	Midas Interactive Entertainment
ProStroke Golf: World Tour 2007	2006	Windows; PlayStation 2 Xbox	Gusto Games	Oxugen Interactive
Real World Golf	April 11, 2006	Windows; PlayStation 2 Xbox	In2Games; Valcon Games	Mad Catz; Valcon Games
Eagle Eye Golf; Enjoy Golf!	October 10, 2006	PlayStation 2	Telenet Japan	Aksys Games
Tiger Woods PGA Tour 07	November 1, 2006	Nintendo DS, Macintosh, Windows, PlayStation 2, PlayStation 3, PlayStation Portable, Wii, Xbox 360	EA Tiburon	EA Sports
Wii Sports	November 19, 2006	Wii	Nintendo EAD	Nintendo
Super Swing Golf	December 2, 2006	Wii	Ntreev Soft; Tecmo	Tecmo
ProStroke Golf: World Tour 2007	September 12, 2006	Windows, PlayStation 2, PlayStation Portable, Xbox	In2Games; Valcon Games	Mad Catz; Valcon Games
Everybody's Golf 5 Hot Shots Golf: Out of Bounds in NA	July 26, 2007	PlayStation 3	Clap Hanz	Sony Computer Entertainment
UTour Golf	August, 2007	Browser	Gusto Games	GMI Technology Limited
Aqua Teen Hunger Force Zombie Ninja Pro-Am	November 5, 2007	PlayStation 2	Creat Studios	Midway
Everybody's Golf Portable 2	December 6, 2007	PlayStation Portable	Clap Hanz	Sony Computer Entertainment
Real World Golf 2007	2007	PlayStation 2, Windows	Aqua Pacific, In2Games	In2Games
Tiger Woods PGA Tour 08	August 28, 2007	Nintendo DS, Macintosh, Windows, PlayStation 2, PlayStation 3, PlayStation Portable, Wii, Xbox 360	EA Tiburon	EA Sports
Super Swing Golf: Season 2	November 29, 2007	Wii	Ntreev Soft; Tecmo	Tecmo; Rising Star Games (EU)
We Love Golf!	December 13, 2007	Wii	Camelot Software Planning	Capcom
King of Clubs	July 29, 2008	Wii	Crave Entertainment	Crave Entertainment
Tiger Woods PGA Tour 09	August 26, 2008	Mobile phone PlayStation 2 PlayStation 3 PlayStation Portable; Wii; Xbox 360	EA Tiburon	EA Sports
World Golf Tour	October, 2008	Browser	Chad Nelson, YuChiang Cheng	World Golf Tour
Tiger Woods PGA Tour 10	June 8, 2009	PlayStation 2 PlayStation 3 PlayStation Portable; Wii; Xbox 360	EA Tiburon	EA Sports
Tiger Woods PGA Tour 11	June 8, 2010	PlayStation 3 Wii; Xbox 360 iOS (iPhone, iPod Touch, iPad)	EA Tiburon	EA Sports
Let's Golf 2	July 22, 2010 (iPhone), August 6, 2010 (iPad), December 1, 2010 (Android), January 11, 2011 (Mac OS X), July 28, 2011 (3DS eShop), October 6, 2011 (BlackBerry), November 16, 2011 (Windows Mobile)	iOS; Android; Mac OS X Nintendo 3DS (Nintendo eShop); BlackBerry; Windows Mobile	Gameloft	Gameloft
John Daly's ProStroke Golf	October 15, 2010 (PS3), November 5, 2010 (Windows, Xbox 360)	PlayStation 3 Windows; Xbox 360	Gusto Games	Oxygen Games
Tiger Woods PGA Tour 12	March 29, 2011 (North America), April 1, 2011 (Europe)	Windows; PlayStation 3 Wii; Xbox 360	EA Tiburon	EA Sports
Let's Golf 3	August 11, 2011 (iOS), October 2011 (Android), December 21, 2011 (OS X), BlackBerry (March 2013)	iOS, Android, OS X, BlackBerry	Gameloft	Gameloft
Wonderputt	August 15, 2011 (Browser), September 12, 2012 (iOS)	Browser iOS	Damp Gnat	Damp Gnat
Everybody's Golf 6	December 17, 2011 (Japan), February 22, 2012 (North America/Europe)	PlayStation Vita	Clap Hanz	Sony Computer Entertainment
Tiger Woods PGA Tour 13	March 27, 2012	PlayStation 3 Xbox 360	EA Tiburon	EA Sports
Death Golf	January 10, 2013	iOS	Ayopa Games LLC	Ayopa Games LLC
Tiger Woods PGA Tour 14	March 26, 2013	PlayStation 3 Xbox 360	EA Tiburon	EA Sports
Powerstar Golf	November 22, 2013	Xbox One	Zoë Mode	Microsoft Studios
Mario Golf: World Tour	May 1, 2014 (Japan), May 2, 2014 (North America/Europe), May 3, 2014 (Australia)	Nintendo 3DS	Camelot Software Planning	Nintendo
The Golf Club	August 19, 2014	Windows, Xbox One, PlayStation 4	HB Studios	Maximum Games
Golfinity	November 12, 2014	iOS	NimbleBit	NimbleBit
Rory McIlroy PGA Tour	July 16, 2015	PlayStation 4 Xbox One	EA Tiburon	EA Sports
Winning Putt	January 2016	Windows	Bandai-Namco	Bandai-Namco
Golf with Your Friends	January 30, 2016	Windows	BlackLightInteractive	BlackLightInteractive
Jack Nicklaus Perfect Golf	May 3, 2016	Windows	Perfect Parallel	Perfect Parallel
100ft Robot Golf	October 10, 2016	PlayStation 4, VR, Windows	No Goblin	No Goblin
The Golf Club VR	January 24, 2017	Windows	HB Studios	Maximum Games
OK Golf	February 9, 2017 (iOS); May 9, 2017 (Android)	iOS, Android	Okidokico Entertainment	Okidokico Entertainment, Playdigious
Mario Sports Superstars	March 10, 2017 (Europe), March 11, 2017 (Australia), March 24, 2017 (North America), March 30, 2017 (Japan)	Nintendo 3DS	Camelot Software Planning; Bandai Namco Games	Nintendo
Golf for Workgroups	April 6, 2017	Windows, Xbox One, PlayStation 4	Cryptic Sea	Devolver Digital
The Golf Club 2	June 27, 2017	Windows, Xbox One, PlayStation 4	HB Studios	Maximum Games
Everybody's Golf (2017)	August 29, 2017	PlayStation 4	Clap Hanz, Japan Studio	Sony Interactive Entertainment
Golf Story	September 28, 2017	Nintendo Switch	Sidebar Games	Sidebar Games
The Golf Club 2019 featuring PGA Tour	August 28, 2018	Windows, Xbox One, PlayStation 4	HB Studios	2K Sports
Brendan Keogh's Putting Challenge	2018 (Pico-8), 2022 (PC), 2024 (Playdate)	Pico-8, PC, Playdate	Brendan Keogh	Paper House
Golden Tee Golf Mobile	2019	iOS, Android	Incredible Technologies	Incredible Technologies
What the Golf?	2019 (iOS, macOS, tvOS, Windows), 2020 (Nintendo Switch), 2024 (visionOS, PS4, PS5)	iOS, macOS, tvOS, Windows, Nintendo Switch, visionOS, PS4, PS5	Triband	Triband
PGA Tour 2K21	August 21, 2020	Windows; Xbox One; PlayStation 4 Nintendo Switch; Stadia	HB Studios	2K Sports
Mario Golf: Super Rush	June 25, 2021	Nintendo Switch	Camelot Software Planning	Nintendo
Golf Club: Wasteland	September 3, 2021	Windows, Xbox One, PlayStation 4, Nintendo Switch	Demagog Studio	Untold Tales S.A.
Golden Tee PGA Tour 2022	2022	Arcade	Incredible Technologies	Incredible Technologies
Nintendo Switch Sports	April 29, 2022	Nintendo Switch	Nintendo EPD	Nintendo
Cursed to Golf	August 18, 2022	Windows, Xbox One, Xbox Series X/S, PlayStation 4, PlayStation 5, Nintendo Switch	Chuhai Labs	Thunderful Publishing
PGA Tour 2K23	October 14, 2022	Windows, Xbox One, Xbox Series X/S, PlayStation 4, PlayStation 5	HB Studios	2K Sports
EA Sports PGA Tour	April 7, 2023	Windows, Xbox Series X/S, PlayStation 5	EA Tiburon	EA Sports
Possibly Endless Golf	September 5, 2023	Windows, Xbox Series X/S	Anefiox	Anefiox
An Other Golf Game	October 30, 2024	Windows	troy	troy
PGA Tour 2K25	February 28, 2025	Windows, PlayStation 5, Xbox Series X/S, Nintendo Switch 2	HB Studios	2K
Puttler	March 28, 2025	Windows	Bean Juice Studios	Bean Juice Studios
Super Battle Golf	February 19, 2026	Windows	Brimstone	Oro Interactive
Normal Golf Game	September 21, 2026	Windows	Luke Muscat	Luke Muscat
Nintendo Switch Sports Resort	October 22, 2026	Nintendo Switch 2	Nintendo EPD	Nintendo

== See also ==
- Sports game
