= Undeadline =

1989 video game

- Developer: T&E Soft
- Publishers: T&E Soft; Palsoft (SMD); BEEP (re-release)
- Director: Tokihiro Naito
- Designer: Tokihiro Naito
- Programmer: Tetsuya Yamamoto
- Artists: Etsuko Suzuki; Hideaki Shinmura; Takahiro Hachiya
- Composer: Kazunori Hasegawa
- Platforms: MSX2; X68000; Mega Drive
- Release: MSX2: JP: July 22, 1989; JP: February 28, 2020 (re-release); X68000: JP: September 14, 1990; JP: July 31, 2020 (re-release); Mega Drive: JP: December 20, 1991
- Genre: Vertically scrolling shooter
- Mode: Single-player

Undeadline (Note: Japanese: アンデッドライン, Hepburn: Andeddorain) is a 1989 vertically scrolling shooter video game developed and originally published by T&E Soft for the MSX2 home computers. It was later ported to the X68000 and Mega Drive, published by Palsoft, followed by digital re-releases for Microsoft Windows. Both the MSX2 and X68000 versions also received physical re-releases by Japanese retailer BEEP. It follows a group of characters in rescue of queen Althea from Zidane, a kingdom surrounded by barriers connected with the demon world, whose monsters have overflowed it. Controlling either a fighter, wizard, or ninja, the player can choose from six stages and play them in any order, fighting against waves of enemies and bosses, while defending or avoiding collision with their projectiles and other obstacles.

Undeadline was directed and designed by Tokihiro Naito, who previously worked on Hydlide and Hydlide 3, with Tetsuya "Futaro" Yamamoto serving as main programmer. The soundtrack was composed by Kazunori Hasegawa. Due to T&E Soft liking to push its playtesters to the limits and as their skills improved naturally, it led to the designers increasing the difficulty to keep up with them, particularly paying attention to both enemy movement and spawn patterns. Because of its rarity, original copies of the MSX2 version commands high prices on the secondary game collecting market. The game received generally favorable reception from critics, most of which reviewed it as an import title, although its difficulty has been criticized.

== Gameplay ==
Gameplay screenshot of the original MSX2 version

Undeadline is a vertical-scrolling shoot 'em up game with role-playing elements that plays from a top-down perspective. The plot revolves around Zidane, a country surrounded by barriers connected with the demon world whose monsters have overflowed it after being broken in a previous regime. Queen Althea manages the kingdom, as his father became exhausted from battle and fell ill, but she is kidnapped by a creature from the demon world. Joined by the wizard Dino and the ninja Ruika, the fighter Leon stands up to rescue his sister. Prior to starting, the player can configure the game's difficulty or activate rapid fire.

Controlling either the fighter, wizard, or ninja, the player can choose from the first six stages and play them in any order, fighting against an assortment of enemy waves, while defending or avoiding collision with their projectiles and other obstacles. There are seven stages in total, which include forests, ruins, and dungeons. The scenery is constantly scrolling and never stops moving until a miniboss or boss is reached, which must be fought to progress further. Each character also possess their own defense methods, such as Leon being able to block projectiles with his shield.

Scattered across every stage are tresure chests containing power-ups that open when shot, ranging from beneficial or harmful items such as a speed boost or poison, to multiple types of weapons. Picking up a new weapon grants its initial state and can be upgraded by picking the same weapon twice in a row. In the Sega Mega Drive version, they can be cycled through other weapons and power-ups by firing at them. After defeating a boss, the player can increase their overall status by granting experience points (EXP) to any of the character's four characteristics: strength (ST), magic (MP), dexterity (DX), and agility (AG). Diamonds can also be found within chests to gain additional experience points. Getting hit by an enemy or blocked by an obstacle and scrolled offscreen decreases the player's life. Once completely depleted, it will result in losing a live stock, as well as a penalty of decreasing the overall firepower of the character's currently equipped weapon to its original state and starting back at the beginning of a stage. The game is over once all lives are lost.

== Development and release ==
Undeadline was developed by T&E Soft, best known for the Hydlide series. It was directed and designed by Tokihiro Naito, who previously worked on Hydlide and Hydlide 3, under supervision of Eiji Yokoyama and Toshiro Yokoyama. Tetsuya "Futaro" Yamamoto served as main programmer, with Katsushi Morizane and Shigeru Tomita providing subroutines. Etsuko Suzuki, Hideaki Shinmura, Kayoko Miura, Kenji Nakashima, Takahiro Hachiya, Takako Hayase, and Yuuji Hattori were responsible for designing the artwork. The music was scored by Kazunori Hasegawa. According to Tetsuya Yamamoto, T&E Soft liked pushing its playtesters to their limits by cutting a hole in paper and using it to cover the screen so only a portion of the playfield was visible at any time. Yamamoto recounted that this led the designers increasing the difficulty to keep up with the testers, as their skills improved naturally, with T&E Soft particularly paying attention to both enemy movement and spawn patterns.

Undeadline was first published for the MSX2 in Japan on July 22, 1989 by T&E Soft. The game was later ported to the X68000 on September 14, 1990, featuring improved visuals and audio, as well as two additional stages. It was also ported to the Sega Mega Drive, published by Palsoft on December 20, 1991. Each version was re-released in digital form for Microsoft Windows through D4 Enterprise's Project EGG service. In 2020, both the MSX2 and X68000 versions received physical re-releases by Japanese retailer BEEP as part of their "BEEP Extra Games" lineup intended for reprinting games on their initial platforms, as original copies of the MSX2 version commands high prices on the secondary game collecting market due to its rarity.

== Reception ==
Reception

Review scores
Publication	Score
Beep! MegaDrive	7.25/10
Famitsu	21/40 (SMD)
Games-X	4/5 (SMD)
Console XS	85/100 (SMD)
Game Zone	82/100 (SMD)
Mega Drive Advanced Gaming	88% (SMD)
MegaTech	79% (SMD)
MSX Club	5/6 (MSX2)
MSX Gids	5/5 (MSX2)
MSX Magazine (JP)	7/6/7 (MSX2)
Oh!X	8/10 (X68000)
Sega Pro	84% (SMD)
Technopolis	6/7 (MSX2)

Undeadline received generally favorable reception from critics, most of which reviewed it as an import title. The Sega Mega Drive version received scores of 18.08 out of 30 and 6.6428 out of 10 in public polls taken by Mega Drive Fan and the Japanese Sega Saturn Magazine respectively. Technopolis highlighted its mixture of role-playing and shooting elements, and the ability to select any stage but noted its difficulty. The Japanese MSX Magazine echoed similar sentiments but also noted the ability to choose between characters, commending its playability, visuals, and scenario. MSX Club's Pere Baño praised the colorful graphics, addictive fast-pacing, sound, presentation, and originality.

An editor for MSX Gids lauded its audiovisual presentation and quality, comparing it favourably with Knightmare (1986). Oh!X's Hiroaki Kageyama commended the X68000 port for taking advantage of the system's hardware and the addition of extra stages. Kageyama also gave positive remarks to the game's idea and intensity. Games-X reviewed the Mega Drive version, commending its presentation for the detailed backgrounds, enemy animations, and atmosphere, but they saw its difficulty even on the easiest setting as a negative. Sega Pro's Damian Butt shared similar thoughts regarding its high difficulty, remarking that it may prove frustrating for players and criticized issues with collision detection. Regardless, Butt praised the "arcade-quality" graphics, large bosses, audio, and long-term gameplay.

MegaTech's Mark Patterson and Paul Glancey found it to be playable shoot 'em up but both remarked that "a couple of problems lead to frustration" and noted the lack of additional option settings. Console XS gave the Mega Drive port high marks for its visuals, sound, gameplay, and challenge. Game Zone's Graham Lineham commended the game for its "neat" ideas, "attractive" graphics, and "smooth" gameplay. He also commented that the environmental hazards made the game more interesting compared to standard shoot 'em ups, but concurred with both Games-X and Butt about its tough difficulty.
