= Pebble Beach Golf Links (video game) =

1994 video game

- Developer: T&E Soft
- Publishers: Panasonic (3DO); Sega (Saturn)
- Platforms: 3DO Interactive Multiplayer, Sega Saturn
- Release: 3DO: JP: March 20, 1994; Sega Saturn; 1995
- Genres: Sports (Golf)
- Modes: Single-player, multiplayer

Pebble Beach Golf Links is a sports video game developed by T&E Soft and originally published by Panasonic for the 3DO in 1994. A Sega Saturn version was published by Sega in 1995. The game features guidance from professional golfer Craig Stadler. It was released in Japan as Pebble Beach Golf Links: Stadler Challenge (Note: Japanese: ペブルビーチ ゴルフ リンクス スタドラーに挑戦, Hepburn: Peburu Bīchi Gorufu Rinkusu Sutadorā Ni Chōsen).

== Gameplay ==
Pebble Beach Golf Links is a golf simulation recreating the Pebble Beach Golf Links course in California, featuring recorded appearances and guidance from professional golfer Craig Stadler. The Saturn version includes six playing modes: Pebble Beach Open, Tournament, Stroke Play, Skins Match, Match Play and Training, alongside a spectator mode.

Players can select clubs and adjust their shots using a timing-based swing system, taking into account the course's terrain and other conditions. The game also features player customisation, action replays, statistical records and previews of the course.

== Reception ==
Reception

Review scores
| Publication | Score |
|---|---|
| Edge | 7/10 (3DO) |
| Electronic Gaming Monthly | 7/10, 7/10, 7/10, 7/10, 7/10 (3DO); 14/20 (SAT) |
| Famitsu | 6/10, 5/10, 6/10, 5/10 (3DO); 27/40 (SAT) |
| Game Informer | 7.75/10 (SAT) |
| Game Players | 72% (SAT) |
| GamePro | 3.825/5 (SAT) |
| Hyper | 78% (SAT) |
| Mean Machines Sega | 88% (SAT), 82% (SAT) |
| Next Generation | 3/5 (SAT) |
| 3DO Magazine | 4/5 (3DO) |
| Consoles + | 93% (3DO) |
| Electronic Entertainment | 4/5 (SAT) |
| MAN!AC | 76% (SAT) |
| Power Unlimited | 80/100 (SAT) |
| Sega MegaZone | 73% (SAT) |
| Sega Pro | 67/100 (SAT) |
| Super GamePower | 3.5/5 (3DO) |
| The Electric Playground | 8/10 (SAT) |
| VideoGames | 7/10 (SAT) |

Next Generation gave the Saturn version of the game three stars out of five. The magazine was generally positive to the gameplay and said that the game demonstrated the power of the Saturn and its potential regarding the graphical capabilities.

European reviews were generally positive. British magazine Mean Machines Sega awarded the Saturn version 82%, praising its presentation, digitised golfers and gameplay, but criticising the inclusion of only one course, which it felt limited the game's longevity. French publication Joypad awarded the game 72%. German magazine MAN!AC gave it 76%, praising its comprehensive golfing features while criticising the limited course selection and relatively unimpressive graphics and sound.

In Japan, a reader survey published by Saturn Fan found that 60% of respondents viewed the game favourably, while 40% gave negative assessments. Readers praised its realistic recreation of golf and the involvement of Craig Stadler, although some criticised the demanding controls and difficulty of judging shots. In the final Sega Saturn Magazine reader rankings, published in March 2000, the game ranked 272nd among 945 rated Saturn titles, receiving an average reader score of approximately 8.38 out of 10.

== See also ==
- True Golf Classics: Pebble Beach Golf Links
