= D4 Enterprise =

Japanese video game publisher

D4 Enterprise Co., Ltd.
- Native name: 株式会社D4エンタープライズ
- Romanized name: Kabushiki-gaisha D4 Entāpuraizu
- Type: Kabushiki gaisha
- Industry: Video games
- Founded: March 3, 2004
- Headquarters: 5-14-1 Ginza, Chūō-ku, Tokyo, Japan
- Key people: Naoto Suzuki (CEO); Ken Sugawara (Director); Ryouzou Yamashita (Director)
- Website: D4 Enterprise

D4 Enterprise Co., Ltd. (株式会社D4エンタープライズ, Kabushiki-gaisha D4 Entāpuraizu; often shortened to D4E) is a Japanese video game publisher currently specializing in content delivery services like Project EGG, EGGY and PicoPico over the Internet. The company has also collaborated with Nintendo to re-release Neo Geo, MSX and arcade titles for the Wii, and MSX titles for the Wii U, as part of the Virtual Console services on both consoles.

Other products and services from D4 Enterprise include EGG Music, a digital music service, focused around soundtracks for older Japanese home computer games; AC-MALL, an online store selling reprints of older video games, soundtracks and other forms of merchandise; and 1chipMSX, a special updated model of the MSX home computer. D4 Enterprise also holds the copyright and trademarks to the game libraries of several defunct Japanese video game companies, including Compile, T&E Soft and Xtalsoft.

== History ==
D4 Enterprise was founded on March 3, 2004, by former Bothtec Inc. employee, Naoto Suzuki. Suzuki had previously been involved with the creation and management of Project EGG - and D4 Enterprise was created in part due to declining interest in the running of that service on the part of Bothtec. D4 Enterprise and Bothtec then entered into an agreement to jointly manage and operate Project EGG, as well as Soft-City.com - the website that hosted Project EGG.

Later on, in September 2004, D4E would start its own game distribution service and entertainment website called "Amusement Center" (often shortened to AC), as a separate entity from its collaboration with Bothtec on Soft-City.com and Project EGG, although Project EGG would later be mirrored on the AC website. As part of the Amusement Center, AC-MALL was also created as a digital storefront for game reprints, books and other merchandise. In November 2004, D4E would launch a sub-section of Amusement Center called the "iTa-Choco Shop". The iTa-Choco Shop was a store focused around games by iTa-Choco Systems - the personal company of Kōji Sumii (also known by the pseudonym, Rasho), the creator of Bokosuka Wars. The iTa-Choco Shop was terminated on May 10, 2022. D4E would also launch another sub-section of Amusement Center called "Compile Station", dedicated to the works of former game publisher Compile. A selection of 40 free (Note: Originally free to all AC members, this functionality was removed on June 30, 2022 - now only paying Project EGG members can access these titles (although they are not part of Project EGG itself, and technical support has been discontinued due to being designed for older, no longer supported versions of Windows)) Compile games and a Madō Monogatari 4-koma webcomic drawn by Compile illustrator "Ichi" are available via Compile Station.

D4 Enterprise continued to jointly operate Soft-City.com, even after Bothtec divested their stake in the service to Gaiax Co. Ltd in early 2005. In August 2005, D4 Enterprise would establish EGG Music as a sub-service of Amusement Center, for the purpose of digitally distributing older video game soundtracks. EGG Music would go on to contain over 200 soundtracks, from over 100 different composers - including works by Ryu Umemoto and Yuzo Koshiro. In early 2006, D4E would collaborate with Internet Revolution Co. Ltd (a joint venture between Konami and Internet Initiative Japan) to provide the emulation service "i-revo games"; 150 titles were released on the service, with games from the Famicom, Super Famicom, PC Engine and MSX available. i-revo games was discontinued on March 31, 2011.

In August 2006, D4 Enterprise would announce their involvement with creating and distributing the 1chipMSX - a special miniature recreation of the MSX2, first shown off in October 2004 and originally created as a collaboration between ASCII Corporation and the MSX Association. (Note: The Managing Director of the MSX Association, Hidekatsu Yokoi, was also a director at D4 Enterprise.) The 1chipMSX would later be exhibited by D4E at Tokyo Game Show 2006, and pre-orders were opened on October 12, 2006. 1chipMSX finally released on December 11, 2006. Only 5000 units of the device were produced, with the last units being sold in a special campaign celebrating the 25th anniversary of the original MSX - in 2008. There were originally plans for Dutch manufacturer Bazix to distribute the 1chipMSX in the West, as the representative of the MSX Association outside of Japan; however licensing difficulties, disagreements between the involved parties and the transfer of the MSX trademark from MSX Association to MSX Licensing Corporation resulted in Bazix terminating their working relationship with MSX Association and 1chipMSX was never released outside of Japan.

On December 29, 2006, another sub-section of the Amusement Center site was opened - Falcom Museum, a service for distributing older Nihon Falcom titles and for compiling information related to all Falcom titles at the time. These older Falcom titles also became available on Project EGG at the same time. In 2007, D4E would establish a record label called EGG Music Records, to distribute physical editions of EGG Music albums. To date, over 30 physical albums have been released under the EGG Music Records imprint.

On September 18, 2007, Neo Geo titles started to become available on the Wii Virtual Console service in Japan - provided by D4 Enterprise, distributing titles under licence from SNK Playmore. Neo Geo Virtual Console titles would later launch on October 5, 2007, in PAL regions and on October 8, 2007, in North America. Neo Geo games would not be added to the South Korean Virtual Console service. In 2008, D4 Enterprise brought the MSX versions of Aleste and Eggy to the Japanese Wii Virtual Console – although both would later be delisted in 2012. D4E would also distribute 13 Konami MSX titles for Wii Virtual Console in late 2009 and early 2010. Later on in 2012, D4E would also bring the arcade versions of Technōs Japan's Nekketsu Kōha Kunio-kun and Sunsoft's Ikki and Shanghai to Virtual Console Arcade on Wii – in Japan only. From 2013 onwards, D4E would also provide the MSX emulator for the Wii U Virtual Console- which was once again Japan-only. The Wii Virtual Console service was discontinued in all regions on January 30, 2019, and the Wii U Virtual Console was discontinued on March 27, 2023.

D4E started releasing apps for iOS in December 2008, starting with ports of old MSX games (including Aleste, Zanac and Nyanpi) but eventually also including original titles such as Jellyfish ip and Hachiko Guru Logi Coupon - the latter of which also receiving an Android port in 2013. On December 2, 2009, Snapdots (a reimagining of the 2001 Game Boy Advance title Guru Logi Champ by Compile) was released for DSiWare. In 2017, D4E would announce and release EGGY, a special version of Project EGG for the Yahoo! Games Game Plus service. Yahoo! Games Game Plus and EGGY were both discontinued in 2020. PicoPico, another emulation service for mobile devices, was first announced by D4E in 2018, before releasing for iOS in 2020 and Android in 2021. The upcoming EGG Console service was announced for Nintendo Switch on March 24, 2023, under the provisional name "Project EGG for Nintendo Switch". This service launched on September 28, 2023, with Relics being the first title.

=== IP Acquisition ===
D4 Enterprise has acquired the rights to the intellectual property (IP) of several Japanese games companies including from several that have gone out of business, with the intent to preserve their libraries and ensure that people can still enjoy their works. Their first acquisition came in November 2005, when it acquired the rights to Compile's game library from Aiky. D4E would later enter a licensing agreement with Compile Heart in 2010, allowing the latter company to use Compile's IP to create new titles. However, neither of these two agreements involved the Puyo Puyo franchise, as Compile had sold the rights for Puyo Puyo to Sega in 1998.

In October 2006, D4 Enterprise announced that it had negotiated a transfer of rights from BBMF Group Inc. for the library of Bothtec, Inc - the company that originally started Project EGG, and where D4E CEO Naoto Suzuki worked before he founded D4E. In 2010, D4E acquired the rights to the 1988 Data East game RoboCop - based on the movie of the same name. The IP rights to the library of HummingBirdSoft (including Laplace no Ma and the Deep Dungeon series) were acquired by D4 Enterprise in March 2013.

D4 Enterprise filed trademark applications for the logos of both T&E Soft (creators of the Hydlide series) and Xtalsoft (makers of Kalin no Tsurugi and the Phantom Heart series) in 2018, and later acquired the rights to the entire game libraries of both companies on March 4, 2019. By this time, D4E had also acquired the rights to the libraries of Cosmos Computer, System Sacom, Carry Lab and Winkysoft. On May 11, 2022, D4 Enterprise announced that it had signed an agreement with Laox to transfer the rights for the "Brain Media" brand name, and all video game IPs associated with the brand. However, D4E did not have access to the games and promotional materials to start distributing the titles on any of their services; so D4E also announced a crowdsourcing campaign to help preserve the game materials.

== Games and products ==
Title	Release date	Platform(s)	Publisher(s)	Developer(s)	Ref.
Project EGG (Note: Retroactively acquired by D4 Enterprise)	November 24, 2001	Windows	Bothtec, Gaiax, D4 Enterprise		
1chipMSX	December 11, 2006	Standalone	D4 Enterprise	MSX Association	
Aleste (MSX version)	December 22, 2008	iOS	D4 Enterprise	Compile	
Nyanpi (MSX version)	February 6, 2009	iOS	D4 Enterprise	Compile	
Relics (MSX version)	March 1, 2009	iOS	D4 Enterprise	Bothtec	
Eggy (MSX version)	April 1, 2009	iOS	D4 Enterprise	Bothtec	
Yōkai Tantei Chima Chima (MSX version)	April 29, 2009	iOS	D4 Enterprise	Bothtec	
Yōkai Tantei Chima Chima (MSX version)	August 13, 2014	iOS	D4 Enterprise	Bothtec	
Jellyfish ip	September 2, 2009	iOS	D4 Enterprise		
Snapdots	October 18, 2010	Nintendo DS (DSiWare)	Nintendo	D4 Enterprise	
Guardic (MSX version)	August 8, 2011	iOS	D4 Enterprise	Compile	
Guardic (MSX version)	August 13, 2014	iOS	D4 Enterprise	Compile	
The Decisive Words HD	May 23, 2012	iOS	D4 Enterprise		
Hachiko Guru Logi Coupon	October 26, 2012	iOS	D4 Enterprise		
Hachiko Guru Logi Coupon	July 22, 2013	Android	D4 Enterprise		
Sorcery Saga: Curse of the Great Curry God (Note: Licensed by D4 Enterprise only)	March 28, 2013	PlayStation Vita	Compile Heart, Aksys Games, Rising Star Games	Compile Heart, ZeroDiv	
Sorcery Saga: Curse of the Great Curry God	June 4, 2018	Windows	Ghostlight	Compile Heart, ZeroDiv	
Final Fantasy VIII	December 5, 2013	Windows	Square Enix	Square Enix, D4 Enterprise	
Hustle! Chumy (MSX version)	December 24, 2013	iOS	D4 Enterprise	Compile	
Zanac (MSX version)	August 2, 2014	iOS	D4 Enterprise	Compile	
Haco Bird	November 22, 2016	iOS	D4 Enterprise		
EGGY (game service)	July 18, 2017	Browser, Android, iOS	Yahoo! Japan	D4 Enterprise	
PicoPico	October 16, 2020	iOS	D4 Enterprise		
PicoPico	July 27, 2021	Android	D4 Enterprise		
Zanac (J2ME version)	January 28, 2021	Nintendo Switch (G-Mode Archives)	G-Mode	Compile	
SF Tokkou Keibi-Tai Dynamite Go! Go!	March 29, 2021	Windows (Project EGG)	D4 Enterprise	Rutubo Games	
Chrono Cross: The Radical Dreamers Edition	April 7, 2022	Nintendo Switch, PlayStation 4, Xbox One, Windows	Square Enix	Square Enix, D4 Enterprise	
EGG Console	September 28, 2023	Nintendo Switch	D4 Enterprise		

=== Physical compilations and reprints ===
Title	Release date	Original Platform(s) (Note: All compilations and reprints have been released for the same platform, Windows.)	Original rightsholder(s)	Titles included	Ref.
Madō Monogatari 1-2-3	September 1, 2008	MSX2	Compile	Madō Monogatari 1-2-3	
Xmas Special Box	November 21, 2008	MSX, MSX2, PlayStation	Compile	Zanac X Zanac, Madō Monogatari 1-2-3, 1chipMSX	
Nichibutsu Early Collection	November 21, 2008	Arcade	Nichibutsu	MagMax, Seicross, Terra Cresta, Crazy Climber, Kid's Horehore Daisakusen, Cosmo Police Galivan	
Sorcerian Complete	August 30, 2010	PC-9801, Mega Drive	Nihon Falcom	Sorcerian, Sorcerian Utility Disk, all 10 Additional Scenario packs for Sorcerian	
Sorcerian Complete	March 31, 2014 (Note: Reprinted version)	PC-9801, Mega Drive	Nihon Falcom	Sorcerian, Sorcerian Utility Disk, all 10 Additional Scenario packs for Sorcerian	
Sorcerian Complete	February 22, 2019 (Note: Updated version for Windows 10, the latest version of windows at this time.)	PC-9801, Mega Drive	Nihon Falcom	Sorcerian, Sorcerian Utility Disk, all 10 Additional Scenario packs for Sorcerian	
Valis: The Fantasm Soldier Complete Plus	November 24, 2011	PC Engine, Mega Drive, Super Famicom	Nihon Telenet	Valis: The Fantasm Soldier, Valis II, Valis III, Valis IV, Super Valis, SD Valis	
All About Bothtec (Note: Never available for purchase - was only distributed as a complementary reward for buying products from AC-Mall during Project EGG's 10th anniversary.)	November 24, 2011	PC-8801, PC-9801, Famicom	Bothtec	Yokai Detective Chima Chima, Eggy, Hot Dog, Paladin, Topple Zip, The Scheme, Relics, CrEastar: Planets in Legend, Relics: Ankoku Yousai	
Dragon Slayer Chronicle	June 15, 2012	PC-8801, MSX, MSX2, PC-9801, PC Engine	Nihon Falcom	Dragon Slayer, Xanadu, Xanadu Scenario II, Romancia, Dragon Slayer IV: Drasle Family, Sorcerian, Dragon Slayer: The Legend of Heroes, Dragon Slayer: The Legend of Heroes II, Lord Monarch, Advanced Lord Monarch, The Legend of Xanadu, The Legend of Xanadu II	
Dragon Slayer Chronicle	August 31, 2014	PC-8801, MSX, MSX2, PC-9801, PC Engine	Nihon Falcom	Dragon Slayer, Xanadu, Xanadu Scenario II, Romancia, Dragon Slayer IV: Drasle Family, Sorcerian, Dragon Slayer: The Legend of Heroes, Dragon Slayer: The Legend of Heroes II, Lord Monarch, Advanced Lord Monarch, The Legend of Xanadu, The Legend of Xanadu II	
Dragon Slayer Chronicle	Summer 2023 (Note: Updated version for Windows 11, the latest version of Windows at this time.)	PC-8801, MSX, MSX2, PC-9801, PC Engine	Nihon Falcom	Dragon Slayer, Xanadu, Xanadu Scenario II, Romancia, Dragon Slayer IV: Drasle Family, Sorcerian, Dragon Slayer: The Legend of Heroes, Dragon Slayer: The Legend of Heroes II, Lord Monarch, Advanced Lord Monarch, The Legend of Xanadu, The Legend of Xanadu II	
Classic PC-Game Collection - The Death Trap • Will • Alpha • Blassty • Genesis -	September 8, 2013	PC-8801, PC-9801	Square	The Death Trap, Will: The Death Trap II, Alpha, Cruise Chaser Blassty, Genesis: Beyond the Revolution	
Madō Monogatari Kyūkyoku Taizen: 1-2-3 & A•R•S	March 31, 2015	MSX2, PC-9801	Compile	Madō Monogatari 1-2-3, Madō Monogatari A•R•S, Madō Monogatari Episode II Carbuncle	
Disc Station Re:1	August 19, 2015	MSX2, PC-9801	Compile	Madoshi Raruba, Broadway Legend Elena, Geo-Conflict, Rune Master, Nyanpi	
Disc Station Re:2	February 5, 2016	MSX, PC-9801	Compile	Apple Sauce: Unexplored Region, Hustle! Chumy, Maou Golvellius, Sword of Destruction, Usagi Gaiden: I am the Trump Card!, Melpool Land Stories	
Madō Monogatari Kyūkyoku Taizen: MD & DS	May 20, 2016	PC-9801, Mega Drive	Compile	Madō Monogatari I, Madō Monogatari: Michikusa Ibun, Rākyo Eating Carbuncle, Great Madō Strategic Monogatari, Great Madō Strategic Monogatari '95, Madō 456, Potato Digging	
Silent Möbius Case: Titanic Reproduction	September 23, 2016	PC-9801	Gainax	Silent Möbius Case: Titanic	
Madō Monogatari Kyūkyoku Taizen Sun: SFC & DS, with Lady Bono!	August 10, 2017	Super Famicom, MSX, PC-9801	Compile	Madō Monogatari: Hanamaru Daiyōchienji, 16 Disk Station titles featuring Madō Monogatari characters, (Note: The Disk Station titles included in this collection are: Carbuncle; Wonderland of Carbuncle; Puyo Puyo Love Story; Madō Monogatari 1-2-3 (Viewing Version); Kikimora's Great Cleaning Strategy; Banana Squash; Wandafry Madō Land; Carbuncle BGV; Curry Eating Carbuncle; Maigo no Aruru; Jidaigeki Oedo Apple Sauce; Apple Sauce; Apple Sauce Summer Festival; Apple Sauce Apprentice; Rabbit Sparrow: Revival of the Hajao; Potato Digging 2; Carbuncle's Drawing Song & Madō Monogatari 1-2-3 Demo) all four parts of Lady Bono	
Madō Monogatari Kyūkyoku Taizen Yōn: GG I-II-III & A	September 28, 2018	Game Gear	Compile	Madō Monogatari I: Mittsu no Madō-kyū, Madō Monogatari II: Arle 16-Sai, Madō Monogatari III: Kyūkyoku Joō-sama, Madō Monogatari A: Dokidoki Vacation	
Daiva Chronicle Re:	September 22, 2019	PC-8801mkIISR, FM77AV, X1, MSX, MSX2, Famicom, PC-9801	T&E Soft	Daiva Story 1 through to Daiva Story 7	
The Trilogy - T&E Soft / Xtal Soft Collection	April 8, 2022	FM-7, PC-6001mkII PC-8801, PC-8801mkII. Famicom, PC-9801, X1 Bonus disc: MSX, MSX2, MSX2+, Game Boy	T&E Soft, Xtalsoft	The Legend of Star Arthur trilogy, Hydlide trilogy Hydlide 3 S.V., Hydlide Special, Hydlide Different Dimension Version, Phantom Heart trilogy, Crimson trilogy, Rune Worth trilogy Initial run included a bonus disc containing: Apermia Dock, Battleship Clapton 2, Laydock, Super Laydock: Mission Striker, Laydock 2: Last Attack, Earth Liberation Army ZAS	
Record of Lodoss War Chronicle	August 31, 2022	PC-9801, MSX2, X68000, Super Famicom	Kadokawa	Record of Lodoss War: Gray Witch, Record of Lodoss War II: Five Coloured Magical Dragon, Record of Lodoss War Fukujinzuke, Record of Lodoss War Fukujinzuke 2, Record of Lodoss War Fukujinzuke 3, Record of Lodoss War, Sword World PC, Sword World SFC, Sword World SFC 2	
Madō Monogatari Super Kyūkyoku Taizen: Puyo Puyo Enters!	April 7, 2023	Super Famicom, PC-9801, Mega Drive, MSX, MSX2, Game Gear, Famicom	Compile	All titles from the previous four Madō Monogatari Kyūkyoku Taizen releases, Puyo Puyo, Nazo Puyo	
Sorcerian Complete Plus	Summer 2023	PC-9801, PC-8801, Mega Drive	Nihon Falcom	All titles from Sorcerian Complete, PC-88 versions of Sorcerian titles	
Exact Perfect Collection: 1990-1994	2023	X68000	Exact	Naious, Aquales, Étoile Princesse, Geograph Seal	

== Project EGG ==
Project EGG (プロジェクトEGG, Purojekuto EGG; EGG stands for "Engrossing Game Gallery") is an emulation-based games content delivery service for Windows operating systems, focused around titles originally released for older Japanese home computers - such as NEC's PC-9801 or Fujitsu's FM-7 systems. Since 2010, the service has also included titles from home consoles (like the Famicom or Sega Mega Drive), as well as arcade games.

Users need to have an account registered with D4 Enterprise's "Amusement Center" website and pay a monthly fee to make use of the service - which is accessed via a desktop client called "EGG Launcher". New titles are added to the service every week, and paying subscribers automatically gain access to over 200 free titles, with more titles available for individual purchase. Some of the titles that have been re-released include: many of Compile's titles like the Zanac and Aleste games; SystemSoft games such as the Daisenryaku games; and Nihon Falcom titles, including multiple entries in the Dragon Slayer and Ys series. In total, over 1000 titles are currently available to play through Project EGG - with an additional 109 titles that were formerly on the service that have since been delisted. (Note: Delisted titles are still available to be re-downloaded and played by Project EGG subscribers who had purchased the titles before they were delisted.)

While the name EGG is an acronym for "Engrossing Game Gallery", it also alludes to the mascot of the service, Eggy - originally from the 1985 Bothtec game of the same name.

=== History ===
The impetus behind the creation of the service was a concern about future generations losing access to older and less popular titles (which Project EGG describes as "cultural heritage"), as the original platforms and media that these titles were played on continued to age and eventually stop working entirely. Naoto Suzuki, an employee at Bothtec, Inc. at the time, along with some of his co-workers felt that there should be legal routes to allow easy access to these older titles, without having to resort to piracy or complicated setting-up of emulators. Therefore, Project EGG was designed to be "pick-up-and-play" and the subscription and client-based systems were implemented to assuage fears of the service promoting piracy.

Suzuki approached the Japan Computer Game Association (JCGA) and asked the game companies that make up the organisation for permission to re-issue titles from their back catalogues. The permission was granted and work began on creating the service. The initial line-up of titles was chosen from the libraries of the members of the JCGA, and the platforms were chosen based on how functional the emulators were; with PC-8801 having the most stable emulator and thus the most starting titles. Project EGG was first launched on November 24, 2001 by Bothtec as part of their Soft-City gaming website.

Suzuki would leave Bothtec in 2004 to found D4 Enterprise, which then entered into an agreement to jointly operate Soft-City and Project EGG with Bothtec. Later that year, D4 Enterprise would start its own game website, Amusement Center (shortened to AC), and a similar service to Project EGG, called "AC PLUS" (or just PLUS) was also made available. AC PLUS handled titles that were more difficult to manage with Project EGG's system - like titles from certain publishers, or game with prices above ¥1000. AC users later gained the ability to use an AC account to register for Project EGG instead of needing a Soft-City account. In early 2005, Bothtec transferred its stake in Soft-City.com and Project EGG to Gaiax Co. Ltd.

In August 2005, Project EGG expanded beyond only re-releasing games, with the introduction of EGG Music - a service for re-releasing game soundtracks for older Japanese video games. D4 Enterprise later became the sole operator of Soft-City.com and Project EGG, acquiring the rights from Gaiax on April 11, 2007; and soon thereafter combined Project EGG and AC PLUS - which at this point had been renamed to EGG Plus - into a single, unified subscription service. Soft-City and Amusement Center were also merged into one website later in the year, in September - with all Soft-City user accounts being migrated over to AC. On May 14, 2017, EGG: Music Direct was added to the service, which allowed Project EGG subscribers to use the EGG Launcher client to listen to the soundtracks of supported titles at any time, if the user had purchased said titles.

For the first 8 years, Project EGG was focused almost exclusively on titles from older Japanese home computers. (Note: With one notable exception of Relics: Ankoku Yousai for Famicom) However in 2010, D4E announced that console games and arcade games would be joining the service - starting in March of that year. Since then, a dozen arcade titles have been released - and games from 7 different home consoles have been made available. (Note: Two of these home console platforms - Neo Geo and SG-1000 - had their Project EGG libraries delisted later)

As part of Project EGG's extended 21st anniversary celebrations, multiple new initiatives have been announced. Guidelines on allowing the creation and monetization of secondary game content on YouTube (such as let's plays) were announced on November 24, 2022 - as part of a collaborative endeavour with Kadokawa Corporation. Announced on March 3, 2023, Project EGG Creators is a special service created to allow for the distribution of newly created games and homebrew titles for retro consoles and computers on Project EGG.

=== EGG Console ===
On March 24, 2023 - as part of Project EGG's aforementioned 21st anniversary celebrations - a special version of Project EGG for the Nintendo Switch was announced - under the provisional name "Project EGG for Nintendo Switch". The name for this console version was later officially confirmed as EGG Console for Switch (EGGCONSOLE in International markets), and features MSX, MSX2, PC-8801, PC-8801mkIISR and PC-9801 games, with Relics for the PC-88 being the first title released on September 28, 2023, in Japan only. While Project EGG on PC requires both a subscription and a standalone payment to allow access to paid titles, EGG Console utilizes entirely standalone purchases from the Nintendo eShop. EGG Console was released in international markets starting on October 12, 2023, also featuring Relics as the label's debut title. EGG Console started to be available on Windows through Steam in February 25, 2026; having Hydlide 3 as its debut title on the storefront.

==== List of EGG Console releases ====
There are currently 112 titles released as part of the EGG Console lineup, 3 of which are no longer available for purchase:

Title	Release date			Original platform	Original rightsholder	Ref.
Title	Japan	North America	PAL regions (Note: All titles released before April 2024 were released one day later than shown below in Australia and New Zealand, due to differing time zones. From April 2024 onwards, release dates in Oceania line up with those in the rest of the world.)	Original platform	Original rightsholder	Ref.
Relics	September 28, 2023	October 12, 2023		PC-8801	Bothtec, Inc.	
Thexder	October 26, 2023			PC-8801mkIISR	Game Arts	
Xanadu	December 14, 2023		December 28, 2023	PC-8801mkIISR	Nihon Falcom	
Silpheed	December 21, 2023		January 11, 2024	PC-8801mkIISR	Game Arts	
Hydlide	December 21, 2023		January 4, 2024	PC-8801	T&E Soft	
Märchen Veil	January 11, 2024		January 18, 2024	PC-8801mkIISR	System Sacom	
Yōkai Detective Chima Chima	January 25, 2024			PC-8801	Bothtec, Inc.	
Ys I: Ancient Ys Vanished	February 15, 2024			PC-8801mkIISR	Nihon Falcom	
Hydlide 3: The Space Memories	February 22, 2024			PC-8801mkIISR	T&E Soft	
Ys II: Ancient Ys Vanished – The Final Chapter	March 14, 2024			PC-8801mkIISR	Nihon Falcom	
Xak: The Art of Visual Stage	March 28, 2024			PC-8801mkIISR	Micro Cabin	
Dragon Slayer IV: Drasle Family	April 11, 2024			MSX2	Nihon Falcom	
Hydlide II: Shine of Darkness	April 18, 2024			PC-8801	T&E Soft	
Ys III: Wanderers from Ys	May 9, 2024			PC-8801	Nihon Falcom	
Shin Maou Golvellius	May 23, 2024			MSX2	Compile	
Sorcerian	June 13, 2024			PC-8801mkIISR	Nihon Falcom	
Tritorn	June 20, 2024			PC-8801	Creative Brain	
Topple Zip	June 27, 2024			PC-8801	Bothtec, Inc.	
Popful Mail	July 11, 2024			PC-8801mkIISR	Nihon Falcom	
Seilane	July 18, 2024			PC-8801mkIISR	Micro Cabin	
Arguice no Tsubasa	August 8, 2024			PC-8801mkIISR	Kogado Studio	
Star Trader	August 22, 2024			PC-8801mkIISR	Nihon Falcom	
Xanadu Scenario II	August 29, 2024			PC-8801mkIISR	Nihon Falcom	
Hydlide	September 5, 2024			MSX	T&E Soft	
Dragon Slayer: The Legend of Heroes	September 12, 2024			PC-8801mkIISR	Nihon Falcom	
Star Cruiser	September 19, 2024			PC-8801mkIISR	Arsys Software	
Silver Ghost	October 3, 2024			PC-8801mkIISR	Kure Software Koubou	
Templo del Sol: Asteka II	October 10, 2024			PC-8801	Nihon Falcom	
Undeadline	October 17, 2024			MSX2	T&E Soft	
Murder Club	October 24, 2024			PC-8801	Riverhillsoft	
Xak II: Rising of the Redmoon	November 7, 2024			PC-8801mkIISR	Micro Cabin	
Ys I: Ancient Ys Vanished	November 14, 2024			MSX2	Nihon Falcom	
Guardic	November 21, 2024			MSX	Compile	
The Scheme	November 28, 2024			PC-8801mkIISR	Bothtec, Inc.	
Riglas: Return of the Soul	December 5, 2024			PC-8801	Random House	
Dragon Slayer: The Legend of Heroes II	December 12, 2024			PC-8801mkIISR	Nihon Falcom	
Aquapolis SOS	December 19, 2024			MSX	Compile	
Babylon	December 26, 2024			PC-8801mkIISR	Xtalsoft	
Ys II: Ancient Ys Vanished – The Final Chapter	January 9, 2025			MSX2	Nihon Falcom	
Crimson	January 16, 2025			PC-8801mkIISR	Xtalsoft	
Zanac	January 23, 2025			MSX	Compile	
Carmine 88	February 6, 2025			PC-8801mkIISR	Micro Cabin	
Arctic	February 13, 2025			PC-8801mkIISR	Artdink	
~~Burai: Jōkan~~ (delisted on October 15, 2025)	February 20, 2025			PC-8801mkIISR	Riverhillsoft	
The Legend of Heroes Saga	March 6, 2025			PC-8801	Micro Cabin	
Super Zenon Gamma 5	March 13, 2025			PC-8801mkIISR	Kure Software Koubou	
Gulkave	March 20, 2025			MSX	Compile	
Ys III: Wanderers from Ys	March 27, 2025			MSX2	Nihon Falcom	
How Many Robot	April 3, 2025			PC-8801mkIISR	Artdink	
Pyramid Warp	April 10, 2025			MSX	T&E Soft	
Dinosaur	April 17, 2025			PC-8801mkIISR	Nihon Falcom	
Mirai	May 1, 2025			PC-8801mkIISR	Creative Brain	
Rune Worth: Black Prince	May 8, 2025			PC-9801	T&E Soft	
Schwarzschild	May 15, 2025			PC-9801	Kogado Studio	
Hydlide II: Shine of Darkness	May 22, 2025			MSX	T&E Soft	
Mugen no Shinzō	June 5, 2025			PC-8801	Xtalsoft	
Revival Xanadu: Easy Ver.	June 12, 2025			PC-9801	Nihon Falcom	
Tritorn	June 19, 2025			MSX	Creative Brain	
Madō Monogatari 1-2-3	June 26, 2025			MSX2	Compile	
~~Fray in Magical Adventure~~ (delisted on August 28, 2025)	July 3, 2025			PC-9801	Micro Cabin	
Zanac EX	July 10, 2025			MSX2	Compile	
Hydlide 3: Special Version	July 24, 2025			PC-9801	T&E Soft	
Manhattan Requiem: Angels Flying in the Dark	July 31, 2025			PC-8801	Riverhillsoft	
Xak Precious Package: The Tower of Gazzel	August 7, 2025			PC-8801mkIISR	Micro Cabin	
~~Brandish Renewal~~ (delisted on August 28, 2025)	August 14, 2025			PC-9801	Nihon Falcom	
Laplace no Ma	August 21, 2025			PC-8801mkIISR	HummingBirdSoft	
Lord Monarch	September 4, 2025			PC-9801	Nihon Falcom	
Crimson II: The Counterattack of the Evil God	September 11, 2025			PC-8801mkIISR	Xtalsoft	
Dai Dassou	September 18, 2025			PC-8801	Carry Lab	
Aramo	October 2, 2025			MSX	Creative Brain	
Miracle Warriors: Seal of the Dark Lord	October 9, 2025			PC-8801	Kogado Studio	
Revival Xanadu II Remix	October 16, 2025			PC-9801	Nihon Falcom	
Kiss of Murder	October 30, 2025			PC-8801	Riverhillsoft	
Mugen no Shinzō II	November 6, 2025			PC-8801	Xtalsoft	
Crystal Chaser: Overlord's Orb of the Sky - Refined	November 13, 2025			PC-9801	GameCorpus	
Xanadu	November 20, 2025			MSX	Nihon Falcom	
Puyo Puyo	November 27, 2025			MSX2	Compile	
Lizard	December 4, 2025			PC-8801	Xtalsoft	
Super Laydock: Mission Striker	December 11, 2025			MSX	T&E Soft	
Mr. Ghost	December 18, 2025			MSX2	System Sacom	
Carbuncle Pi	December 25, 2025			MSX2	Compile	
Rune Worth 2	January 8, 2026			PC-9801	T&E Soft	
Mad Rider	January 15, 2026			MSX2	Carry Lab	
Courageous Perseus	January 22, 2026			PC-8801	Cosmos Computer	
Wonderland of Carbuncle	January 29, 2026			MSX2	Compile	
Super Tritorn	February 5, 2026			MSX2	Creative Brain	
Eggy	February 12, 2026			PC-8801	Bothtec, Inc.	
Mugen no Shinzō III	February 19, 2026			PC-8801mkIISR	Xtalsoft	
Super Cooks	February 26, 2026			MSX2	Compile	
Tōdō Ryūnosuke Tantei Nikki: Kohakuiro no Yuigon	March 5, 2026			PC-8801mkIISR	Riverhillsoft	
Advanced Lord Monarch	March 12, 2026			PC-9801	Nihon Falcom	
Hydlide	March 19, 2026			MSX2	T&E Soft	
A-Train	March 26, 2026			PC-8801	Artdink	
C-So!	April 2, 2026			MSX	Compile	
Schwarzschild II	April 9, 2026			PC-9801	Kogado Studio	
Psycho World	April 16, 2026			MSX2	Hertz	
Adventure of Randar	April 23, 2026			MSX2	Compile	
Deep Dungeon: Madō Senki	May 7, 2026			MSX	HummingBirdSoft	
Meurtre d'un Clown	May 14, 2026			PC-8801	Thinking Rabbit	
Laydock 2: Last Attack	May 21, 2026			MSX2+	T&E Soft	
Hercules	May 28, 2026			PC-8801mkIISR	Kogado Studio	
Märchen Veil II	June 4, 2026			PC-9801	System Sacom	
Mirai	June 11, 2026			MSX2	Creative Brain	
Space Adventure: Zodiac	June 18, 2026			PC-8801	Riverhillsoft	
First Queen IV	June 25, 2026			PC-9801	Kure Software Koubou	
Relics	July 2, 2026			MSX2	Bothtec, Inc.	
Hydefos: Hyper Defending Force System	July 9, 2026			MSX2	Hertz	
Harry Fox	July 16, 2026			PC-8801	Micro Cabin	
Dragon Slayer Level 2.0	July 23, 2026			PC-8801	Nihon Falcom	
Elthlead	August 6, 2026			PC-8801mkIISR	Masaya Games	
Onryō Senki	August 13, 2026			PC-8801	Studio Wing	
The Legend of Heroes III: White Witch Renewal	August 20, 2026			PC-9801	Studio Wing	
Puyo Puyo	August 27, 2026			PC-9801	Compile	
Borfes and the Five Demons	September 3, 2026			MSX	Xtalsoft	
Sabnack	September 10, 2026			PC-9801	Kogado Studio	
Deep Dungeon II	September 17, 2026			MSX	HummingBirdSoft	
Nyanpi	October 1, 2026			MSX2	Compile	

== EGGY ==
EGGY was an emulation-based games distribution service for the Yahoo! Games Game Plus platform - an initiative for promoting HTML5 games and Cloud gaming; which was compatible with Web browsers, iOS and Android. EGGY had a wide range of MSX, MSX2 and PC-9801 titles available, including HummingBirdSoft's Deep Dungeon and Microcabin's Xak: The Art of Visual Stage; and game save data could be transferred between different platforms freely. Like Project EGG, users needed to pay a monthly subscription fee to play these titles, but no further purchases were necessary for any individual titles afterwards. Also similarly to Project EGG, the service was named after the mascot "Eggy" from the Bothtec title of the same name.

It was originally announced and launched alongside the Yahoo! Games Game Plus platform, on July 18, 2017, with a library of 20 MSX titles. The subscription fee would later be lowered in December 2017. Yahoo! Games Game Plus - along with all content hosted on it, including EGGY - was discontinued on September 23, 2020.

=== List of EGGY games ===
There were 49 games on EGGY, which all became unavailable upon the termination of the service in 2020:

Title	Release date	Original platform	Original rightsholder	Ref.
Anty	July 18, 2017	MSX	Bothtec, Inc.	
Eggy	July 18, 2017	MSX	Bothtec, Inc.	
Topple Zip	July 18, 2017	MSX	Bothtec, Inc.	
Yokai Detective Chima Chima	July 18, 2017	MSX	Bothtec, Inc.	
Guardic	July 18, 2017	MSX	Compile	
Hustle! Chumy	July 18, 2017	MSX	Compile	
Maou Golvellius	July 18, 2017	MSX	Compile	
Deep Dungeon: Madō Senki	July 18, 2017	MSX	HummingBirdSoft	
Ninja	July 18, 2017	MSX2	Bothtec, Inc.	
Relics	July 18, 2017	MSX2	Bothtec, Inc.	
Final Jaboon	July 18, 2017	MSX2	Compile	
Green Crystal	July 18, 2017	MSX2	Compile	
Jaboon Runner	July 18, 2017	MSX2	Compile	
Jump Hero II: Jinsei wa Jaboon	July 18, 2017	MSX2	Compile	
Kerosuke no Gokkan Jigoku	July 18, 2017	MSX2	Compile	
Rune Master	July 18, 2017	MSX2	Compile	
Zanac	July 18, 2017	MSX2	Compile	
Zanac EX	July 18, 2017	MSX2	Compile	
Xak: The Art of Visual Stage	July 18, 2017	MSX2	Micro Cabin	
Ys I: Ancient Ys Vanished	July 18, 2017	MSX2	Nihon Falcom	
Romancia	August 2, 2017	MSX2	Nihon Falcom	
Fray in Magical Adventure	August 9, 2017	MSX2	Micro Cabin	
Deep Dungeon II: Yūshi no Monshō	August 16, 2017	MSX	HummingBirdSoft	
Rude Breaker	August 23, 2017	PC-9801	Compile	
Kote de Mekuru	August 30, 2017	PC-9801	Compile	
Star Trader	September 6, 2017	PC-9801	Nihon Falcom	
Seilane	September 13, 2017	MSX2	Micro Cabin	
Maboroshi Fukyoden	September 20, 2017	PC-9801	Compile	
Sword of the Goddess - Chapter of Peruna	September 27, 2017	PC-9801	Compile	
Disc Saga: Immoral Dragon	October 4, 2017	PC-9801	Compile	
Transborder	October 18, 2017	PC-9801	Compile	
Ys II: Ancient Ys Vanished – The Final Chapter	November 1, 2017	MSX2	Nihon Falcom	
Phantom City	November 15, 2017	PC-9801	Micro Cabin	
Jump Hero	November 29, 2017	PC-9801	Compile	
Popful Mail	December 13, 2017	PC-9801	Nihon Falcom	
Rusty #1	December 27, 2017	PC-9801	Compile	
Dragon Slayer: The Legend of Heroes	January 10, 2018	MSX2	Nihon Falcom	
Devil Force Part 1	January 24, 2018	PC-9801	Compile	
Ys III: Wanderers from Ys	February 7, 2018	MSX2	Nihon Falcom	
Runner's High	February 21, 2018	PC-9801	Compile	
Ys I: Ancient Ys Vanished	March 7, 2018	PC-9801	Nihon Falcom	
Usazaku Gaiden: I'm the Trump Card	March 22, 2018	PC-9801	Compile	
Ys II: Ancient Ys Vanished – The Final Chapter	April 4, 2018	PC-9801	Nihon Falcom	
Nyanpi	April 18, 2018	MSX2	Compile	
Pico Pico	May 9, 2018	MSX	Micro Cabin	
Ys III: Wanderers from Ys	June 13, 2018	PC-9801	Nihon Falcom	
Xak III: The Eternal Recurrence	July 11, 2018	PC-9801	Micro Cabin	
Addmath	August 8, 2018	PC-9801	Compile	
Broadway Legend Elena	September 12, 2018	PC-9801	Compile	

== PicoPico ==
PicoPico (sometimes stylised as pico2) is an emulation-based games distribution service for iOS, iPadOS and Android mobile operating systems, released in 2020 and initially focused on Famicom titles - with Game Gear and MSX titles added to the service later in 2021. A paid monthly subscription (called Pico Plan) is required to access the full content of the app (Note: The price of the subscription differs between the iOS/iPadOS and Android versions.) - although the app itself can be downloaded for free, and select titles are available without the subscription as part of the "Free Plan". Titles available include Data East's BurgerTime, T&E Soft's Hydlide and several titles from the Madō Monogatari series. It also features title music composed by Yuzo Koshiro.

Originally announced in 2018 for a 2019 release, PicoPico started out as a collaboration between D4 Enterprise and Dwango as part of Dwango's "experimental broadcast" functionality for its video sharing and livestreaming service Niconico. However, the release was delayed into 2020 and D4 Enterprise eventually acquired sole rights to the service in April 2020. In July 2020, D4 Enterprise entered into a partnership with canow Co. Ltd, to help assist with "live gameplay" on PicoPico.

PicoPico was first launched on October 16, 2020, with a starting library of 30 Famicom titles, and was initially only available for iOS and iPadOS devices. Features available at launch included game manuals, quick save functionality, video recording, online multiplayer for supported titles, Bluetooth controller support and an offline mode where paid subscribers can continue using the app for 24 hours even without being connected to the internet. Select MSX and Sega Game Gear titles started being added to the service from February 15, 2021, onwards. An update on April 29, 2021, added the ability for free users to access all paid titles, by watching advertisements in the app.

The Android version of PicoPico was released on July 27, 2021 - with a slimmed down feature set compared to its App Store counterparts. (Note: The Android version lacks support for video recording, live broadcast to Niconico, offline mode, score attack/time attack and online multiplayer.) Save data and video sharing functionality was added to all versions of the app via an update on November 2, 2021, with the ability view and search through other players shared save data and videos in-app added later in November.

== See also ==
- MSX
- Neo Geo
- Wii Virtual Console
- Wii U Virtual Console
