= True Golf Classics: Wicked 18 =

1993 video game

- North American SNES box art
- Developer: T&E Soft
- Publishers: NA: Bullet-Proof Software; JP: T&E Soft; JP: Sega (Mega Drive)
- Programmers: Kentaro Nishiwaki; Shinsuke Miyamoto
- Series: True Golf Classics
- Platforms: Super NES, NEC PC9801, 3DO, Sega Mega Drive
- Release: 1993; Mega Drive: JP: January 28, 1994
- Genre: Sports (golf)
- Modes: Single-player, multiplayer

True Golf Classics: Wicked 18 (Note: Known in Japan as New 3D Golf Simulation: Devil's Course (Japanese: New 3D Golf Simulation: デビルズコース)) is a golf video game originally released by T&E Soft in 1993 for the Super Famicom in Japan and by Bullet-Proof Software for the Super NES in North America. A version was later released for the 3DO Interactive Multiplayer and the Mega Drive. The game takes place on a very difficult otherworldly golf course. It is part of the True Golf Classics series, but unlike other games such as Pebble Beach and Waialae Country Club, which portray actual golf courses, Wicked 18 portrays an entirely fictitious golf course.

== Gameplay ==
The game takes place on a difficult, fictitious golf course.

The object is to guide the golf ball through nearly impossible obstacles (lava, statues, extremely steep hills and mountains, omnipresent water hazards, huge sand traps, floating chunks of earth, gorges, cement) as the player tries to score as low as possible in order to win the day. Using the caddie, it is possible to scan the situation before hitting the ball with an analyzer. The bunkers are extremely treacherous, there is lava as well as water hazards, and 'out of bounds' can be in the middle of the hole. The "out of bounds" area could either be a platform game-style pit, an extended area of sand, or simply an unplayable rift. The game offers stroke play, match play, or tournament play.

There are also four caddies that help them. Each of them has their own personality and opinions about certain areas of each hole.

== Reception ==
Next Generation reviewed the Saturn version of the game, rating it three stars out of five, and stated that "In the end, if you're looking for a fresh approach to video golf this may be your only alternative, and it's a pretty good one."
