= Pebble Beach (disambiguation) =

Pebble Beach is a coastal resort community in Monterey County, California, US.

Pebble Beach may also refer to:

== Other beaches ==
- Pebble Beach in San Mateo County
- Pebble Beach in Sea Ranch, California
- Pebble Beach in Del Norte County

== In golf ==
- Pebble Beach Golf Links, a golf course in Pebble Beach, California
- The Pebble Beach National Pro-Am tournament
- The Pebble Beach Invitational tournament

== Other uses ==
- Shingle beach, a beach that contains pebbles or cobbles
- Pebble Beach Concours d'Elegance, an annual automotive charitable event
- Pebble Beach no Hotou, a 1992 video game
- A section of the North Lawn of the White House used for television broadcasts.
