= Waialae Country Club =

Country club in Honolulu, Hawaii

- Location in Hawaii
- 21.272°N 157.775°W

Club information
- Location: East Honolulu, Hawaii
- Elevation: Sea level
- Established: 1927; 99 years ago
- Type: Private
- Tota holes: 18
- Tournaments: Sony Open in Hawaii
- Greens: Tifdwarf Bermuda
- Fairways: Winter ryegrass
- Website: www.waialaecc.com

Waialae Country Club
- Designed by: Seth Raynor
- Par: 72
- Length: 7,125 yards (6,515 m)
- Course rating: 74.6
- Slope rating: 141

Waialae Country Club is a private country club in East Honolulu, Hawaii. Founded in 1927 and designed by Seth Raynor, it is a par 72 championship course at 7,125 yards (6,515 m) from the Championship tees. From the Members tees at 6,456 yards (5,903 m), the course rating is 71.8 with a slope rating of 136.

The Waialae golf course hosts the Sony Open in Hawaii on the PGA Tour in January, the first full-field event of the calendar year. The event has had several corporate sponsors since its founding in 1965 as the Hawaiian Open.

Waialae was featured in the video games True Golf Classics: Waialae Country Club, Waialae Country Club: True Golf Classics and Tiger Woods PGA Tour 13 (as well as a handful of earlier games in the franchise).

== Location ==
In the 2000 U.S. census, the U.S. Census Bureau defined the K-8 campus as being in the urban Honolulu census-designated place. For the 2010 U.S. census, the bureau created a new census-designated place, East Honolulu.

== Origin of Wai'alae ==
Wai'alae is a Hawaiian word for spring water of the mud hen, which comes from mud hen ('alae) and spring water (wai).

=== wai ===
In the 1830s and 1840s, the location of the artesian spring for the spring water (or wai) in Wai'alae was a closely guarded secret known only by an elderly couple. King Kamehameha III drank from this spring while visiting. During the twentieth century, the location of the spring became unknown.

=== 'alae ===
The wetlands in the Hawaiian Islands are a winter habitat for the American coot which is also known as "mud hen". The Hawaiian mud hen (or 'alae), which is referred to in Wai'alae, is the endemic Gallinula sandvicensis and is a close relative of the coot. Mud hens, moorhens, marsh hens, and swamp hens are closely related.
