= Greg Norman's Shark Attack!: The Ultimate Golf Simulator =

1990 video game

- Developer: Gremlin Graphics
- Publisher: Gremlin Graphics
- Release: 1990

Greg Norman's Shark Attack!: The Ultimate Golf Simulator is a 1990 video game published by Gremlin Graphics.

== Gameplay ==
Greg Norman's Shark Attack!: The Ultimate Golf Simulator is a game in which two golf courses are included: a fictional course called Gremlin, and the RAC course at Epsom. The game simulates vegetation and weather cycles, and players are able to alter the wind, weather, and ball effects. The game allows up to four players to compete in singles, fourball, foursome, and greensome styles. The game features a full view of each hole, placed on an overlaid 3-D grid.

Australian professional golfer Greg Norman, whose name is in the title, was known as the "Great White Shark".

== Reception ==
Reception

Review scores
Publication	Score
Computer and Video Games	81%
The Games Machine (UK)	73%

Brian Walker reviewed Greg Norman's Shark Attack!: The Ultimate Golf Simulator for Games International magazine, and gave it a rating of 1 out of 10 (a turkey) due to bugs, and stated that "Ultimate Golf feels like a game that's been programmed by people who have never played a round in their lives. A strange birdie indeed."

Gordon Houghton for Computer and Video Games complimented the game system, and said that "It's not as much fun as Leaderboard, but it's a far more accurate simulation and should appeal to armchair pitch and putt fans looking for something a bit more demanding."

Ciaran Brennan for The One appreciated innovations like varying weather and being able to walk the course, but felt that "this is still some way off being the definitive golfing simulation".

The Games Machine found that while the game "tries to expand upon the bog-standard Leaderboard rip-off with its grid landscape and adjustable swing and strike angle" he felt that this was "no major improvement".

== See also ==
- List of golf video games
- Greg Norman's Golf Power
