= Virtual Hydlide =

1995 video game

- North American cover art
- Developer: T&E Soft
- Publishers: JP/PAL: Sega; NA: Atlus
- Designer: Tokihiro Naito
- Programmer: Kentaro Nishiwaki
- Artists: Toyokazu Hattori; Yoshinori Kiritani
- Composer: Yumi Kinoshita
- Platform: Sega Saturn
- Release: JP: April 28, 1995; NA: September 1995; EU: December 29, 1995
- Genre: Action role-playing
- Mode: Single-player

Virtual Hydlide (ヴァーチャルハイドライド, Vācharu Haidoraido) is a 1995 action role-playing game developed by T&E Soft and published by Sega in Europe and Japan, and Atlus in North America for the Sega Saturn. It is a remake of the original Hydlide (1984), incorporating full 3D graphics and a player character digitized from a live actor. On release, it received mixed reviews, with praise for its graphics, 3D environments and music, while receiving criticism for its gameplay.

== Plot ==
The player takes on the role of a hero on a quest to defeat an evil demon named Varalys who has turned the princess of Hydlide into three fairies. Before confronting Varalys, the hero must find the fairies and three magical jewels to restore the princess to her regular self.

== Gameplay ==
A screenshot of combat in the game. Here, the player character fights the vampire boss in the Vampire's Mansion.

Virtual Hydlide is a role-playing video game in which the player roams the world (the titular Hydlide), searching through dungeons for weapons and armour. Virtual Hydlide differs by leveling the player character up only after completing certain objectives of the game, whereas most RPGs level the player character up once they have obtained a certain number of experience points.

A different game world is generated each time a new game is started; instead of traditional random dungeons, the developers of Virtual Hydlide actually designed more than 20 different level maps for each of the seven dungeons, as well as more than 20 different maps for the overworld. When starting a new game, the maps for the dungeons and overworld are randomly selected from their designated level sets. Thus, though every dungeon design was created by a human designer rather than a random level generator, there are more than 25 billion possible game worlds. Moreover, each game world is identified with an alphabetic code which may be entered when starting a new game, allowing players to replay favorite level designs or compete for high scores on identical worlds. Non-boss enemies do not appear in set locations, and continuously respawn in randomly determined locations.

== Reception ==
Reception

Review scores
Publication	Score
Famitsu	7/10, 6/10, 6/10, 8/10
Next Generation	2/5

Virtual Hydlide was released in Japan on April 28, 1995.

Next Generation said that the game is "visually stunning" with its over-the-shoulder viewpoint and fully 3D environments, but suffers from awkward and "more-or-less tedious" gameplay. GamePro, in contrast, said the visuals take time to get used to due to confusing camera angles, clunky scrolling, and graininess which makes it hard to spot items. They also criticized the outdated sound effects during combat and the difficulty in judging how distant enemies are. However, they praised the medieval orchestrated soundtrack and said the game "kind of grows on you", concluding that though most gamers would be put off by Virtual Hydlide, some would find it worthwhile for its compelling next generation elements.

The game has been run multiple times at Games Done Quick events in the "Awful Block" for the best of the worst games.
