= Blaze and Blade: Eternal Quest =

1998 video game

Blaze & Blade: Eternal Quest
- Developers: T&E Soft; Conspiracy Entertainment Corporation (PC)
- Publishers: JP: T&E Soft (PS); EU: Funsoft (PS); EU: THQ (PC); NA: SouthPeak Interactive (PC)
- Composer: Ken Kojima
- Platforms: PlayStation, Windows
- Release: PlayStation: JP: January 29, 1998; PAL: November 1998; Windows: PAL: 1999; NA: January 31, 2000
- Genre: Action role-playing game
- Modes: Single-player, multiplayer

Blaze & Blade: Eternal Quest (ブレイズ＆ブレイド 〜エターナルクエスト〜, Bureizu & Bureido 〜Etānaru Kuesuto〜), also known as simply Blaze & Blade, is a multiplayer action role-playing game developed by T&E Soft for the PlayStation and Microsoft Windows. It is the first in the series (the other being Blaze & Blade Busters, which uses the same engine), and the only one released outside Japan.

== Gameplay ==
Blaze & Blade is a "hack and slash" action RPG with a heavy emphasis on puzzle solving. The game allows for characters to be created with one of eight classes and offered the ability to choose the sex of each character. The PlayStation version supports multiplayer capabilities as both the MultiTap and cable link are supported.

== Plot ==
Adventurers come across an ancient lithograph during their travels, supposedly very valuable, and desire to verify the authenticity of this artifact. To do so, the adventurers dive into more dungeons to collect magical gems which in legend fit into the inset of the lithograph. The lithograph united with these magical gems is said to impart great power to the wielders of this artifact, and if the adventurers do receive great power due to reuniting these treasures it will serve as proof to them that they have found the legendary artifact of lore.

== Reception ==
Reception

Aggregate score
Aggregator	Score
GameRankings	38%

Review scores
Publication	Score
AllGame	3/5
Computer Games Strategy Plus	1.5/5
EP Daily	3/10
Famitsu	(PS) 23/40
Game Informer	3.5/10
GameRevolution	F
GameSpot	3.9/10
GameSpy	38%
GameZone	6/10
IGN	4.4/10
Next Generation	1/5
PlayStation Official Magazine – UK	(PS) 6/10
PC Gamer (US)	7%
RPGFan	48%

The PC version received unfavorable reviews according to the review aggregation website GameRankings. Eric Bratcher of NextGen said that the game was "crap in a box. If you get this 'game' as a gift, throw it away – even Goodwill probably won't take it." In Japan, Famitsu gave the PlayStation version a score of 23 out of 40.

The game won the award for "Worst Game of the Year" at GameSpot's Best and Worst of 2000 Awards.
