= Disney Golf =

2002 video game

- European cover art of Disney Golf
- Developer: T&E SOFT Inc.
- Publishers: JP: Capcom; NA: Electronic Arts; PAL: Disney Interactive
- Director: Kentaro Nishiwaki
- Designers: Shintaro Tajima; Hidefumi Watanabe; Tashimasa Shimizu; Nanae Nishihara; Yumiko Shiotsu; Kazuya Imai; Shinichi Hamada; Kazuhisa Watanabe
- Artist: Takanori Tateishi
- Writer: Kengo Shinoda
- Composer: Katsumi Yokokawa
- Platform: PlayStation 2
- Release: JP: May 30, 2002; NA: October 15, 2002; UK: December 20, 2002
- Genre: Sports
- Modes: Single-player, multiplayer

Disney Golf (Note: Known in Japan as Disney Golf Classic (Note: Japanese: ディズニーゴルフクラシック, Hepburn: Dizunī Gorufu Kurashikku)) is a Disney sports game developed by T&E SOFT and the spiritual successor to Swing Away Golf, which was also developed by T&E Soft. The game is similar to Mario Golf, even though some animations are different from those in Mario Golf: Toadstool Tour. It was released in Japan by Capcom on May 30, 2002. A localized version by Disney Interactive and Electronic Arts was shown at the Electronic Entertainment Expo in the same year and was eventually released in North America in October, and later in Europe in December, locally distributed by Electronic Arts in the country and published by Disney Interactive. It was later re-released in Europe in 2005 with distribution done through Disney, alongside other games.

== Gameplay ==
The game features nine characters to play as or against on a choice of six different courses. Donald, Goofy, Minnie, and Morty are playable from the start, while Daisy, Pete, Ludwig, Max, and Mortimer must be unlocked. The six fictitious courses include American, Western, Mountain, Tropical, European, and the special Sky Course. Players can also earn tokens while on the links by achieving long putts, perfect swings, and chip-ins, which the tokens can be spent on one of 62 items. The game is unusual for the fact that Mickey Mouse is not playable unlike other Disney games, instead appearing as the golf caddy.

== Development ==
In March 2002, a Japanese retailer reported that Capcom released pre-ordered information for the Japanese version of the game to ship to markets in Japan on May 30, 2002. Capcom stayed out of the character-based golf realm (presently dominated by Sony's Everybody's Golf and Camelot's Mario Golf), but Disney Golf would naturally have the cachet of its license to carry it.

First shown to the United States with little fanfare at the 2002 Electronic Entertainment Expo by Swing Away Golf developer T&E Soft, Disney Golf was aimed at casual sports fans of all ages and was the fifth golf game to be made for the PlayStation 2.

== Reception ==
Reception

Aggregate score
Aggregator	Score
Metacritic	72/100

Review scores
Publication	Score
AllGame	3/5
Famitsu	30/40
Game Informer	7.75/10
GamePro	4.5/5
GameSpot	7.3/10
GameZone	8.2/10
IGN	5.5/10
Official U.S. PlayStation Magazine	4/5
PlayStation: The Official Magazine	7/10

The game received "average" reviews according to the review aggregation website Metacritic. In Japan, Famitsu gave it a score of 30 out of 40.
