= Golf (1995 video game) =

1995 golf game for the Virtual Boy

- North American box art
- Developer: T&E Soft
- Publishers: JP: T&E Soft; NA: Nintendo
- Platform: Virtual Boy
- Release: JP: August 11, 1995; NA: November 1995
- Genre: Sports (Golf)
- Mode: Single player

Golf (Note: Known in Japan as T&E Virtual Golf (Japanese: T＆ＥT＆Ｅヴァーチャルゴルフ, Hepburn: T&E Bācharu Gorufu)) is a video game developed and published by T&E Soft for the Virtual Boy. It was released in August 1995 in Japan and by Nintendo in November 1995 in North America. Golf uses standard golf rules and is set in the fictional 18-hole Papillion Golf & Country Club. Hazards include water, sand traps, trees, and deep rough grass. It is displayed in the Virtual Boy's standard red and black color scheme with 3D effects by use of a 3D processor. It was met with critical praise for its controls and physics and mixed reviews for its graphics. Nintendo Power called it the third best Virtual Boy release of its year.

== Gameplay ==
Gameplay screenshot

Golf's gameplay follows traditional golf rules, where players must reach the hole on the green in as few strokes as possible by hitting the ball with a club, while avoiding obstacles including sand traps, water hazards, trees, and deep rough grass. It takes place in the fictional 18-hole Papilion Golf & Country Club. Players choose between two modes of play: Tournament, where they compete against 47 virtual computer-controlled opponents, and Stroke, where they attempt to surpass their previous high scores. In the screen's top left and right corners, players are shown the wind speed/direction and an aerial layout of the course respectively. In advance of their turn, they choose aspects of the swing, such as speed, direction, stance, club type, swing power, and the ball impact point. Players can also place a grid on a nearby portion of the course to aide with the aim and distance of their shots. Players can choose between five different viewing perspectives, change button configurations, and review the positives and negatives of their last shots.

== Development and release ==
Golf was developed by T&E Soft for the Virtual Boy. It was originally known as VR Golf. Like all other Virtual Boy games, Golf uses a red-and-black color scheme and uses parallax, an optical trick that is used to simulate a 3D effect. It was published by T&E Soft in Japan on August 11, 1995, and by Nintendo in North America sometime in November 1995.

Golf was added to the Nintendo Classics service on February 17, 2026. D4 Enterprise owns the rights to the game, having acquired T&E Soft's trademark and intellectual property in 2019.

== Reception ==
Reception

Review scores
Publication	Score
AllGame	3.5/5
Famitsu	8/10, 7/10, 7/10, 4/10 (Note: Each of the four reviewers in Famitsu scored the game on a ten point scale)
Next Generation	2/5

Golf had mixed to positive reception. Critics such as Official Nintendo Magazine, Edge, AllGame, Famitsu, and Nintendo Power noted T&E Soft's experience with golf games, the latter which called it the third best Virtual Boy game of the year. Nintendo Power also called Golf the most realistic sports game on the Virtual Boy at the time of its release. A reviewer for Next Generation said that the gameplay holds up surprisingly well to golf simulations on systems better suited to the genre. However, Total! magazine felt that the game was very basic and lacked in content and features.

The audiovisual elements received mixed reviews. GamePro and Electronic Playground both found the game fun but were disappointed by its graphics. GamePro additionally criticized the audio quality. Total! felt that the game had some of the console's worst 3D effects. Next Generation felt that the console's limitations and the game's ineffective use of its 3D abilities hindered it, making features in the distance difficult to make out. AllGame felt that the audio and sense of depth were poor, but commended its use of shading. Famitsu made similar criticisms towards the game's lack of depth for the console. Nintendo Magazine was more positive, praising its presentation and perspective.

== See also ==
- List of Virtual Boy games
