= Greg Norman's Golf Power =

1992 video game

- Cover art
- Developer: Gremlin Interactive
- Publisher: Virgin Games
- Director: James North‑Hearn
- Designer: Rob Bowman
- Artist: Tim May
- Writers: Simon Blake; Chris Harvey; Scott Guest
- Composer: Barry Leitch
- Platform: Nintendo Entertainment System
- Release: NA: July 1992
- Genre: Traditional golf simulation
- Modes: Single-player, multiplayer

Greg Norman's Golf Power is a golf-simulation video game developed by Gremlin Interactive for the Nintendo Entertainment System (NES), and published by Virgin Games in 1992. It was the final golf title published for the NES. A European release was planned but never occurred.

== Gameplay ==
Other than bearing the name and likeness of Australian professional golfer Greg Norman, the game is distinguished from most other golf simulations by providing a hole-design mode in which the player can create and customize an 18-hole course. The cartridge contained a battery back-up that allowed the player to save their created course. Along with the hole-design mode, there are four pre-set courses, taking place in England, Scotland, the United States, and Japan.

The game made use of the NES Four Score, which allows for four-player gameplay.

== See also ==
- Greg Norman's Shark Attack!: The Ultimate Golf Simulator
- List of golf video games
- List of Nintendo Entertainment System games
