= Shadow: War of Succession =

1994 3DO fighting game

- Developer: Tribeca Digital Studios
- Publishers: NA: Tribeca Digital Studios; JP: T&E Soft
- Producers: Lawrence Ng; Tong Malanac
- Programmer: Mark Erdtmann
- Artist: Alvin Williamson
- Writers: Joel Manalac; R.J. Araneta
- Composer: Rob Wallace
- Platform: 3DO Interactive Multiplayer
- Release: NA: 1994; JP: 2 September 1994
- Genre: Fighting
- Modes: Single-player, multiplayer

Shadow: War of Succession (known in Japan as Shadow Warriors) is a 1994 fighting video game developed and published by Tribeca Digital Studios for 3DO.

== Gameplay ==
Gameplay screenshot showcasing a match between Carlos Cortez and Anvil Stiles.

Shadow: War of Succession is a fighting game that uses digitized characters.

== Plot ==
The central story revolves around the death of Kinkaid Storm, the chairman of Storm International. Unbeknownst to the public, Kinkaid was also the leader of S.H.A.D.O.W., a global crime syndicate, under the title of Shadow King. With his death, some of his lieutenants and other individuals see a chance to gain power and fight each other to become the next leader of S.H.A.D.O.W.. The player must choose one of these combatants and triumph over the others.

After defeating the other fighters, the player's character goes to the Storm Building, the headquarters of Storm International and S.H.A.D.O.W., to become the next leader of the syndicate. However, they find the building in ruins and a cyborg of Kinkaid, who survived the attempt on his life, waiting for them. After defeating the reborn Shadow King, the ending for the player's chosen character plays out and the game ends.

== Reception and legacy ==
Reception

Review scores
Publication	Score
GamePro	2/5
Next Generation	1/5
Electronic Games	F
MAN!AC	16%
Player One	30%
Ultimate Future Games	44%
VideoGames	2/10

Shadow: War of Succession garnered an extremely negative reception. Journalists of the release era universally panned every aspect of the game including its scenario; selection of fighters; gameplay; sound design; and the quality and animation of its digitized sprites. 3DO Magazine editor Mark Wynn, concluded, "Three minutes of play should guarantee Shadow’s swift exit from your 3DO player, forever banished. A definitive set of instructions on how not to write a videogame." Next Generation stated, "Use the disc as a coaster for your coffee mug - you'll get more use out of it and enjoy it more." VideoGames warned, "Do not buy this game under any circumstances, no matter how desperate you are to try out a new fighting game for your 3DO. You can thank me later for saving you 60 bucks." Ultimate Future Games voiced similar complaints as other magazines, but did praise the introduction sequence for featuring a "very nicely rendered chopper." Several publications heavily preferred Naughty Dog's Way of the Warrior, another critically maligned 3DO fighting game. VideoGames listed Shadow among the ten worst game releases from 1994. Flux listed it as the tenth worst game of all time in 1995 while Electronic Gaming Monthly listed it as the third worst game of all time in 1997. Journalist and author Steven L. Kent considered it the second worst game of all time.

Retrospectives have considered Shadow as a low-quality clone of the popular Mortal Kombat series from Midway Games. Jason Russell of WhatCulture ranked it as the fourth worst Mortal Kombat rip-off, recounting the 1994 gaming media's note of its nearly-broken gameplay mechanics. Evan Hopkins of Comic Book Resources named it among 15 bad Mortal Kombat rip-offs, labeling the game "ugly, sloppy, and downright unplayable" and summarizing, "You'd probably prefer a spine-ripping over having to spend 30 seconds with this busted Mortal Kombat clone." Internet video game critic James Rolfe called the game the worst of the Mortal Kombat clones in particular highlighting the controls, gameplay, and the lack of fatalities despite the presence of in-game prompts for them. Writing about Mortal Kombat clones, Hardcore Gaming 101 contributor Robert E. Naytor largely faulted the rapid speed of the fights in Shadow, requiring the player to simply spam special attacks so the computer AI has no way to react.
