= Winning Putt =

2016 video game

- Developer: Webzen/Onnet
- Publisher: Bandai Namco Entertainment America
- Engine: CryEngine
- Platform: Microsoft Windows
- Release: October 25, 2016
- Genres: Golf, Sports, MMORPG
- Mode: Multiplayer

Winning Putt was a massively multiplayer online game in which players take on the role of a golfer. Winning Putt is developed by Webzen/Onnet, and published in North America by Bandai Namco Entertainment America. The online golf game was free to play, and included microtransactions. The servers for Winning Putt were shut down permanently on December 14, 2018.

== Gameplay ==
Winning Putt allows up to four players to tee-off together on several fictional golf courses. The game also features a social hub called "The Square" where player avatars can interact with other players and buy or sell items from various NPCs, or trade with other players. Players earn experience and gold, an in game currency, with each swing they take, and get bonuses on completing a hole or round of golf. When a player earns enough experience they will advance in level, and after level 5 begin earning training points to further advance their character's statistics. Gold can be used in game for a variety of items which can be purchased from other players or NPC shops.

The actual game of golf makes use of a standard 3 click swing bar seen in many other golf games. Players click once to start their swing, again to set power, and a third time to set the accuracy of their shot.

Classes can unlock skills by spending their training points in different stats. Skills allow player to change the way a base shot works, allowing players to curve the ball through the air intentionally, or even reduce the effect that flying through a tree can have on a ball. Skills are broken down into three types: Power, Accuracy, and Common. As the names suggest, each class gets their own unique skills while also gaining some from a pool shared between both.

Winning Putt currently has 11 Courses of varying difficulty. Each course can be played on five different difficulties, which change the starting tee position, and the pin position.

== Development ==
In-Game Screenshot of the User Interface

Winning Putt was originally developed as a Korean title and then later marketed to the United States. The game entered Open Beta on January 14, 2016 in North America by Bandai Namco Entertainment as a free online download and is currently available through the publisher's website or via Steam, where it was released on October 25, 2016.

Game updates were published on a regular basis with regular content updates coming out every few months. Content updates varied from implementing player-suggested content to integrating worldwide festivities throughout Winning Putt's world.

Winning Putt was published in North America by Bandai Namco Entertainment America, and in Korea by Webzen/Onnet. The North American version was only available in English but had a large following outside the states with a sizable chunk of users playing from Europe and Russia.

== Closure ==
On November 1, 2018 The Winning Putt team announced that the game would close on December 14, 2018 at 3.00pm PST.
