= Waialae Country Club: True Golf Classics =

1998 video game

- North American cover art
- Developer: T&E Soft
- Publisher: Nintendo
- Platform: Nintendo 64
- Release: NA: July 27, 1998; EU: August 24, 1998
- Genre: Sports
- Modes: Single player Multiplayer

Waialae Country Club: True Golf Classics is a golf video game developed by T&E Soft and published by Nintendo for the Nintendo 64 in 1998. It is part of the True Golf Classics series (New 3D Golf Simulation in Japan) Although set at the same real life golf course, it is a different game than True Golf Classics: Waialae Country Club, released in 1991 for the Super NES. It was preceded by the game Masters '98: Haruka Naru Augusta, which was released in Japan in 1997; although both have very similarly styled graphics and gameplay, they are set at different golf courses.

== Summary ==
Waialae Country Club: True Golf Classics is set in the eponymous Waialae Country Club in East Honolulu, Hawaii. There are six gameplay modes: Waialae Open, tournament play, stroke play, match play, skins play, and practice mode.

== Reception ==
Reception

Aggregate score
Aggregator	Score
GameRankings	63.4%

Review scores
Publication	Score
GameRevolution	1/10
GameSpot	6.6/10
IGN	5.8/10
N64 Magazine	49% (US); 49% (UK)

IGN stated that the gameplay was that of a "formula golf game" with nothing extraordinary. The graphics received negative reviews, citing how poor the graphics were for how late the game was released in the Nintendo 64's life cycle. Matt Casamassina of IGN said that the sound was "not bad", with crowd cheers, positive commentary after a good hit, and sympathetic commentary when a player isn't doing so well.

In its first full month of release, Waialae Country Club was the seventh best-selling home console game in the United States.

== See also ==
- Eikō no Saint Andrews Japanese Exclusive Nintendo 64 golf game.
- Mario Golf, a Nintendo 64 golf game.
