= Masters '98: Harukanaru Augusta =

1997 video game

- Developer: T&E Soft
- Publishers: T&E Soft
- Series: Harukanaru Augusta
- Platform: Nintendo 64
- Release: JP: December 26, 1997
- Genre: Sports
- Modes: Single player Multiplayer

Masters '98: Harukanaru Augusta (MASTERS '98 遥かなるオーガスタ) is a golf game for the Nintendo 64. It was licensed by Augusta National Golf Club and released only in Japan in 1997. It is one of three Nintendo 64 Japanese exclusive golf releases, the others being Eikō no Saint Andrews and the 64DD Japan Pro Golf Tour 64. It is a continuation of T&E Soft golf series and the first golf game for the Nintendo 64, it was followed by the release of Waialae Country Club: True Golf Classics in 1998, although each used much of the same programming engine the locations and courses themselves are completely different. T&E had previously released a game based on Augusta National as part of their New 3D Golf Simulation (True Golf Classics outside Japan) series.

== Gameplay ==
The player uses the Augusta National Golf Club course, in one of five play modes; Training, Stroke Play, Match Play, Tournament, and Masters Tournament. Each hole has an opening fly over with descriptive text in Japanese, and includes audio commentary in Japanese by TBS announcer Matsushita Kenji and professional golfer Nobumitsu Yuhara while the score card and the main screen of play are in English. The playable characters are animated similarly to Mortal Kombat, Nobumitsu Yuhara also provided motion capture for one of the players. Crowds among the fields, lens flares as the camera angle angles skyward, and even the Club house and various landmarks are also visible along the course. The player is also able at any time to go to the options menu, and select the "Cart Cam" view for the current hole, allowing the entire hole to be viewed from ground or the air.
