= True Golf Classics: Waialae Country Club =

1991 video game

- North American box art (Super NES)
- Developer: T&E Soft
- Publishers: T&E Soft; Sega (Mega Drive)
- Series: True Golf
- Platforms: SNES; NEC PC-9801; Sega Mega Drive; 3DO; Satellaview
- Release: SNES; NA: November 1991; JP: September 18, 1992; Sega Mega Drive; JP: February 25, 1994; 3DO; NA: 1994; Satellaview; JP: October 26, 1997
- Genre: Traditional golf simulation
- Modes: Single-player, multiplayer

True Golf Classics: Waialae Country Club (Note: Known in Japan as New 3D Golf Simulation: Waialae no Kiseki (Japanese: ワイアラエの奇蹟)) is a golf simulation video game developed and published by T&E Soft. This entry in the company's long-running golf simulation series had a staggered release across multiple platforms. It simulates the sport on courses rendered using the blueprints of the Waialae Country Club in Honolulu, Hawaii. Initial reviews for its debut as a Super NES launch game praised its graphics and gameplay depth. The 3DO version later became the top-selling game for its platform in the United States in November 1994. A separate game developed by T&E Soft set on the same course is the 1998 Nintendo 64 game, Waialae Country Club: True Golf Classics.

== Gameplay ==
True Golf Classics: Waialae Country Club is a methodical golf simulation emphasizing realism and strategy. Its design implements a multi-layered shot system requiring players to manage numerous variables. Each shot involves distinct phases of strategy, setup, and execution, simulating a real golfer's thought process. The primary "Shot Setup" window guides the player through aiming, club selection, stance adjustment, and the swing. Players can toggle between a ground-level view and a top-down fly-over of the hole to assess the fairway and hazards. Aim is adjusted to account for the course layout and on-screen wind indicators. Although a caddie recommends a club for the given distance, the player can manually select any club in their set.

A key feature for its era is the ability to adjust a golfer's stance to induce a "draw" (a controlled right-to-left curve) or a "fade" (a left-to-right curve), allowing skilled players to navigate doglegs and avoid obstacles. The swing is executed with a two-part timing mechanic. The player first stops a cycling power gauge to set the shot's power relative to the club's maximum yardage. Immediately after, a "Contact Selector" appears over the ball; a second button press determines the point of impact, which can impart backspin, topspin, a hook, or a slice. This dual-input system for power and contact formed the core of the game's challenge.

Once on the green, a grid is overlaid on the surface to show contour lines and slope, but this grid disappears once the putting stroke is initiated. This requires the player to memorize the green's topography before the shot, simulating the mental visualization of real-world putting. The game supports up to four players taking alternating turns. It features Tournament, Stroke Play, Match Play, and Practice modes. Players can customize their golfer, caddie, club set, and statistics.

== Development ==
Waialae Country Club was developed by T&E Soft, a Japanese company founded in 1982 by brothers Toshiro and Eiji Yokoyama. The company was initially known for the action RPG series Hydlide, and had success in the golf simulation genre with the 1991 Harukanaru Augusta. The design philosophy was "to take you to Oahu, Hawaii, for 18 holes of championship golf action with all the excitement—and surprises of the real game".

== Release ==
The release of Waialae Country Club was staggered across multiple years and platforms. Its most prominent release was on the Super NES in November 1991. The Japanese release on the Super Famicom followed nearly one year later on September 18, 1992.

On February 25, 1994, a Japan-exclusive version titled New 3D Golf Simulation: Waialae no Kiseki was published by Sega for the Mega Drive. The 16-bit console generation was mature and technical standards were higher. The release came just one month after T&E Soft's Devil's Course 3D Golf on Mega Drive, and a reviewer for Sega-16 noted this timing suggested a strategy of converting its established back-catalog to the Mega Drive user base late in the console's life cycle.

An enhanced version was also published by T&E Soft in North America in 1994 for the 3DO Interactive Multiplayer, a 32-bit CD-ROM console. This version was positioned to take advantage of the 3DO's more powerful hardware and the storage capacity of the CD format.

The game's final incarnation arrived on October 26, 1997, when it was broadcast digitally for the Satellaview, a satellite modem peripheral for the Super Famicom in Japan. This release transformed the game into episodic, downloadable content, demonstrating its enduring popularity in Japan six years after its initial debut.

== Reception ==
Reception

Review scores
Publication	Score
Electronic Gaming Monthly	SNES: 7/10
GameFan	3DO: 87.5% (avg.)
NGamer	3DO: 3/5
Nintendo Power	SNES: 3.675/5
Sega-16	MD: 6/10

Reception for the game varied by platform, reflecting its long and staggered release cycle. For its debut as a SNES launch game, Electronic Gaming Monthly's four reviewers scored it 7, 6, 8, and 7 out of 10. They praised the realistic gameplay and options but noted the slow screen redraws and high difficulty. GamePro praised it as a "primo golf cart" and a "solid, great-looking game of golf with an excellent selection of options". Nintendo Power rated it a 3.675 out of 5 across two reviews in late 1991 and early 1992. The UK magazine Super Play gave it an 82%, calling it a "superb" and "deadly accurate" simulation, but saying it lacked the "pizazz" of more arcade-style golf games.

The 3DO version received positive reviews. GameFan's two reviewers gave it scores of 85% and 90%, with one calling it "the best golf simulation, period". They praised its enhanced graphics, sound, and fast gameplay compared to the cartridge versions. Next Generation gave it three stars out of five, commenting, "Waialae is all the more enjoyable for enabling you to sport eighteen holes without having to wear stupid pants and talk merger deals". In the United States, the 3DO version became the top-selling game for the platform in November 1994.

== Successor ==
In 1998, T&E Soft developed Waialae Country Club: True Golf Classics for the Nintendo 64. It was published by Nintendo as a technologically distinct successor, not a remake. It uses a more advanced 3D engine that T&E Soft had previously developed for Masters '98: Haruka Naru Augusta, another Nintendo 64 golf game released exclusively in Japan. However, the graphics from its newer engine were considered dated by the standards of the late Nintendo 64 era. IGN's review of the successor criticized its visuals as a "bitmap-infested, unimpressive blur", and called it a "first generation" game released too late.
