= OK Golf =

2017 video game

- App icon
- Developer: Okidokico Entertainment
- Publisher: Okidokico Entertainment (Note: Published to Android by Playdigious.)
- Platforms: iOS, Android, tvOS
- Release: iOS; February 9, 2017; Android; May 9, 2017; tvOS; June 28, 2017
- Genre: Sports
- Modes: Single-player, multiplayer

OK Golf is a 2017 golf video game developed and published by Okidokico Entertainment. Gameplay follows the player shooting a golf ball to a hole through a golf course in the least amount of shots, similar to actual golf. It was released for iOS in February 2017, followed by a port for Android—published by Playdigious—in May 2017, and a tvOS version in June 2017. OK Golf was met with a mixed reception, with praise for its graphics but criticism for its gameplay and controls.

== Gameplay ==
In OK Golf, the player must complete courses by shooting a golf ball to a hole while keeping below par.

Set in Aberdeen, Scotland, OK Golf tasks the player to hit a golf ball across four different courses with nine holes each in the least amount of shots. To make a shot, the player pulls back on the screen; pulling farther will result in a stronger super shot. The player must evade hazards such as trees and sand, and they are given no golf clubs. Each course contains a secret hole that is situated at a hidden point.

OK Golf has three modes: championship, time trial, and freeplay. Time trial mode requires the player to complete all courses in the least amount of time, and freeplay mode allows the player to go through each hole of the course at their own pace.

== Release ==
OK Golf was developed by the Canadian studio Okidokico Entertainment. It was released for iOS on February 9, 2017, and for Android by Playdigious on May 9, 2017. A port for tvOS was released on June 28, 2017.

A new golf course named Miami Palms and two new modes—online and pass and play multiplayer—were added in May 2017. New England and Paris courses were added in June and August 2017 respectively, along with another course titled Lapland and iPhone X compatibility in December 2017. Another course, commemorating its first anniversary, was added in February 2018.

== Reception ==
Reception

Aggregate score
Aggregator	Score
Metacritic	65/100

Review scores
Publication	Score
Gamezebo	60/100
Pocket Gamer	3.5/5
TouchArcade	3.5/5
148Apps	3/5

On the review aggregation website Metacritic, OK Golf has a "mixed or average" score of 65 based on six critics.

The gameplay received mixed opinions. While some critics found OK Golf relaxing, others felt negative towards its oversimplified style of gameplay. 148Apps writer Campbell Bird and Nik Ives-Allison of Gamezebo criticized the limited amount of shot capabilities, the latter of whom thought it had "unrealistic" par ratings and inaccurate golf clubs. Additionally, TouchArcade's Carter Dotson noted its "rather punishing" hazards but praised the time trial mode.

Conversely, the graphics were praised; reviewers appreciated OK Golf's minimalist art style. Dotson described the graphics as "immediately striking" and stated that its choice to be set in a "sterile abyss" was "rather cool". Bird highlighted that the variety in finding a solution to complete a course helped to increase replayability.

OK Golf's controls were negatively received for their poor performance. While most reviewers found them simple and easy to learn, others found them imprecise, pointing out issues in rotating the camera. Ives-Allison remarked that the controls were "sticky", drawing attention to the inconsistent speed at which the screen and projection lines move. Additionally, Dotson criticized its "annoying" shaking effect, the "imperfect" shot controls, and the "random" super shot.
