= T&E Soft =

Video game brand

Daikokuya Global Holding Co., Ltd
- Logo used from 1982 to 2002
- Native name: 大黒屋グローバルホールディング株式会社
- Romanized name: Kabushiki-Gaisha Daikokuya Gurōbaruhōrudingu
- Formerly: T&E Soft Co. Ltd. (1982-2002); D Wonderland Co. Ltd. (2002-2012)
- Type: Kabushiki gaisha
- Industry: Retail
- Founded: October 14, 1982
- Headquarters: Kōnan, Tokyo
- Subsidiaries: Daikokuya
- Website: www.tes.co.jp (archived) daikokuya-ghd.jp

T&E Soft Co., Ltd.
- Native name: 株式会社ティーアンドイーソフト
- Romanized name: Kabushiki-Gaisha Tīandoīsofuto
- Industry: Video games
- Predecessor: Digital Golf Co., Ltd.
- Founded: January 21, 2008
- Defunct: January 2013
- Fate: Merged into Spike Chunsoft
- Successor: Spike Chunsoft
- Headquarters: Nagoya, Japan
- Parent: Games Arena
- Website: www.tandesoft.co.jp (archived)

T&E Soft is a brand used by two former video game development companies. The original incarnation is T&E Soft Co. Ltd. (Note: 株式会社ティーアンドイーソフト, Kabushiki-Gaisha Tīandoīsofuto) which made games in a wide variety of genres, and is primarily known for action role-playing, golf and puzzle video games. It was renamed Daikokuya Global Holding Co., Ltd but ceased game development. Another company named Deep Co., Ltd. acquired T&E Soft's trademark rights on April 22, 2005, with a new company established in 2008 to continue game development until January 2013 when it was merged into Spike Chunsoft.

== History ==
=== Original company ===
T&E Soft Co., Ltd was founded in 1982, named after the founders, older brother Toshiro Yokoyama and his younger brother Eiji Yokoyama. The abbreviation was later changed to Tri & Exciting and then Technology & Entertainment.

T&E Soft launched by selling video games for NEC's PC-6001 series. Beginning in 1983, it developed games for multiple models other than the PC-6001. In December 1983, T&E Soft published its own magazine to promote its products and by January 1985 launched its newsletter that lasted until July 1990. In October 1990, Xtalsoft was merged with T&E Soft and became T&E SOFT Osaka Development Department.

The company became famous for its 8-bit personal computer games including the Hydlide series. It entered the home video game console in March 1986 with the in-house development of the Family Computer software Hydlide Special which was released by Toshiba EMI. Since the success of the Super Famicom software Harukanaru Augusta, released in April 1991, T&E Soft gradually moved away from personal computers to focus on its titles for video game consoles. At some point, Square founder Masafumi Miyamoto was the majority shareholder of T&E Soft.

In May 2002, T&E Soft Corporation changed its name to D Wonderland Inc.

The company was renamed to its current name to serve as a holding company in 2015; its subsidiary Daikokuya, which was acquired by D Wonderland in 2006, operates a retailer chain of the same name. The company privatized in 2010.

=== New company ===
In April 2005, Deep Co., Ltd. acquired the trademark rights of the T&E Soft name. In January 2006, Digital Golf Co., Ltd. absorbed Deep Co., Ltd. and established a game development branch in Nagoya under the brand name of T&E Soft.

The development department of Digital Golf in Nagoya was eventually split off into its own company T&E Soft Co., Ltd on January 21, 2008. The following week on January 30, Games Arena Co., Ltd. (a subsidiary of Dwango Co., Ltd.) announced that it would acquire all issued shares of T&E Soft Co., Ltd.

This incarnation of T&E Soft was less prolific than the original, though it had a closer relationship with Nintendo and worked on some of its games, including True Swing Golf and You, Me, and the Cubes.

Chunsoft and Spike, which Games Arena had both previously acquired on individual basis, merged in April 2012 to form Spike Chunsoft. The new T&E Soft Co., Ltd was absorbed and merged with Spike Chunsoft in January 2013. Games Arena had dissolved in June 2012.

On March 4, 2019, D4 Enterprise announced that it has acquired the intellectual property rights of products released under T&E Soft.

== Games published ==
=== 3DO ===
- Advanced Dungeons & Dragons: Slayer (Japanese release)
- Pebble Beach Golf
- Devil's Course, known in US as True Golf Classics: Wicked 18
- True Golf Classics: Waialae Country Club
- Shadow: War Of Succession (Japanese release)

=== Computers ===
- Hydlide
- Hydlide II: Shine of Darkness
- Hydlide 3
- Legend of Star Arthur
- Legend of Star Arthur II
- Legend of Star Arthur III: Terra 4001

=== Game Boy ===
- Chikyū Kaihō Gun ZAS

=== Mega Drive/Genesis ===
- New 3D Golf Simulation: Harukanaru Augusta
- Undead Line

=== MSX ===
- 3-D Golf Simulation
- Pyramid Warp
- Battle Ship Clapton II
- Daiva Story 4
- Daiva Story 5
- Ashguine Story 2
- Greatest Driver
- Hydlide
- Hydlide II: Shine of Darkness
- Hydlide 3
- Laydock
- Rune Worth
- Laydock 2 Last Attack
- Super Laydock
- Butaporc
- Psy-o-blade
- Undead Line

=== PlayStation ===
- Cu-On-Pa
- Sonata

=== Super NES/Super Famicom ===
- BUSHI Seiryūden: Futari no Yūsha
- Cu-On-Pa
- Pebble Beach no Hatou New: Tournament Edition, known in the US as True Golf Classics: Pebble Beach Golf Links
- New 3D Golf Simulation: Waialae no Kiseki, known in the US as True Golf Classics: Waialae Country Club
- Devil's Course, known in the US as True Golf Classics: Wicked 18
- Lode Runner Twin: Justy to Liberty no Daibouken
- The Lost Vikings, (Super Famicom version)
- Sword World SFC
- Sword World SFC 2: Inishie no Kyojin Densetsu

=== Virtual Boy ===
- Golf
- Red Alarm
- 3D Tetris

=== 3DO ===
- Pebble Beach Golf

=== Game Boy ===
- Chikyū Kaihō Gun ZAS

=== Genesis/Mega Drive ===
- New 3D Golf Simulation: Waialae no Kiseki
- Pebble Beach Golf Links
- Undead Line
- Super Hydlide A different name for this port of Hydlide 3.

=== MSX ===
- Hydlide
- Hydlide II: Shine of Darkness
- Hydlide 3: The Space Memories
- Undead Line
- Rune Worth
- Daiva Story 4: Asura's Bloodfeud
- Daiva Story 5: The Cup of Soma
- Greatest Driver
- Laydock
- Pyramid Warp
- Super Laydock
- Laydock 2
- Ashguine Story II
- Trick Boy
- Battle Ship Clapton II

=== Famicom/NES ===
- Hydlide Special on the Famicom. Hydlide on the NES.
- Hydlide 3: 闇からの訪問者
- Daiva Story 6: Imperial of Nirsartia

=== Nintendo 64 ===
- Waialae Country Club: True Golf Classics
- Masters '98: Haruka Naru Augusta

=== Nintendo DS ===
- True Swing Golf

=== PC ===
- Blaze and Blade: Eternal Quest

=== PlayStation ===
- Blaze and Blade: Eternal Quest
- Cu-On-Pa
- Sonata

=== PlayStation 2 ===
- Disney Golf
- Swing Away Golf

=== Saturn ===
- Virtual Hydlide
- Waialae no Kiseki: Extra 36 Holes

=== Super NES/Super Famicom ===
- Cu-On-Pa
- New 3D Golf Simulation: Waialae no Kiseki, known in US as True Golf Classics: Waialae Country Club
- Pebble Beach no Hatou New: Tournament Edition
- Power Lode Runner
- Rise of the Robots
- True Golf Classics: Pebble Beach Golf Links

=== Virtual Boy ===
- 3D Tetris
- Golf
- Red Alarm

=== Wii ===
- You, Me, and the Cubes
