= Chikyū Kaihō Gun ZAS =

1992 video game

- Cover art
- Developer: T&E Soft
- Publishers: T&E Soft
- Platform: Game Boy
- Release: JP: December 18, 1992
- Genre: Shoot 'em up
- Mode: Single-player

Chikyū Kaihō Gun ZAS (地球解放軍ジアース; lit. "Earth Liberation Army: ZAS") is a vertical scrolling shooter video game developed and published by T&E Soft for the Nintendo Game Boy exclusively in Japan on December 18, 1992.

== Story ==
Sometime in the 21st century, humanity leaves Earth for Mars due to environmental pollution on their home planet. The Earth remained uninhabited until a group of highly advanced robots from another galaxy arrive and take over. They alter the planet's environment to suit their needs. An impromptu liberation army is formed to retake the planet from the robots, who have removed the pollution on Earth.

== Gameplay ==
Starting in Stage 5, the action starts to get hectic as enemies and obstacles constantly surround the player.

The gameplay is done in a style similar to Gradius and R-Type.

Players proceed through the game; shooting enemies while dodging obstacles and collecting power-ups for their shooting weapons. The game uses the basic configuration for the ship's control; with one button doing the shooting. As a complex scrolling shooter, this game attempts to emulate multiple dimensions using the limitations of the Game Boy console. The parallax backgrounds and elaborate detailing in the sprites help to create a unique Game Boy experience; any distinctions between the scenery and the bad guys are clearly shown through different shades of the same color.

A higher degree of difficulty exists in this game as opposed to most Game Boy scrolling shooters of that era. Timing is essential to clearing most stages and for defeating the end-level bosses.

There are five levels in the game. While the first four levels can be freely chosen, the fifth level in the game is unlocked after finishing the first four levels.

Video gaming website Blame the Control Pad praises Chikyū Kaihō Gun ZAS for its innovative gameplay along with its integrated levels and player-friendly control scheme.

The game was re-released in 2026 by ModRetro.

== Credits ==
- Tadashi Nakatsuji (Director, Sub Program, Sound Effects)
- M. Nagashima (Main Program)
- M. Takahashi (Main Designer)
- T. Ishida, S. Nishimura (Sub Designers)
- Yumi Kinoshita, Shigekazu Kamaki (Music)

== See also ==
- Chikyū
- SolarStriker
