= True Swing Golf =

2005 video game

- European box art
- Developer: T&E Soft
- Publisher: Nintendo
- Director: Yuichi Mizobe
- Platforms: Nintendo DS; DSiWare
- Release: Nintendo DS: JP: November 10, 2005; EU: November 25, 2005; NA: January 23, 2006; DSiWare: PAL: November 13, 2009; NA: February 1, 2010
- Genre: Sports
- Modes: Single player Multiplayer

True Swing Golf (also known as Nintendo Touch Golf: Birdie Challenge in PAL regions, and 大人のDSゴルフ (Otona no DS Golf; DS Golf for Adults) in Japan) is a golf video game developed by T&E Soft and published by Nintendo for the Nintendo DS. It was released in Japan and PAL territories in 2005 and North America in 2006.

The game features a course based on the Phoenix Country Club in Miyazaki.

== Gameplay ==
The game features four separate modes of play: Stroke Play, where the player embarks on any courses unlocked in the game; Match Play, where the player engages in a matchplay against a computer opponent of a chosen difficulty level; Free Round, where the player is free to take on any hole on any particular course they have already unlocked; Championship, where the player progresses through a series of tournaments in order to unlock other courses and progress through the ranks, from a Rookie to a Junior, then Senior and finally Master.

DS Download Play allows only Stroke Play and Match Play modes. Another game mode known as Skins Match is available if all the players have a copy of the game.

The game also features a Golf Shop which sells golfing equipment (separated into clubsets, golf balls and golf shoes), and, depending on the player's progress in the Championship, restocks its inventories with more advanced equipment until the player has completed the Masters Level Championship.

Despite it being named as a realistic golf game, players could utilise their clubset's skills to power up their shots, deliver more spin to the ball, or curve the ball more, which would decrease a Power Meter that gradually charges up over time as a player advances through the golf course.

There are a total of fifteen courses to unlock, the last three which are essentially extremely windy versions of the first three courses the player would encounter in the game.

== Regional differences ==
The Japanese version has a built-in illustrated glossary of golf terminology, which is missing from the Western releases.

== DSiWare release ==
'True Swing Golf Express' (North America) and 'A Little Bit of...Nintendo Touch Golf' (PAL regions) was released following other re-release titles for the DSiWare download service.

The DSiWare version of the game does not include any Wi-Fi features, such as Local/Download Play or the in-game PictoChat function. It also features less courses than the retail game.

However, it adds several unique features:

- includes an updated and improved version of the game engine
- higher framerate due do the increased CPU speed of the Nintendo DSi
- a more refined user interface
- improved, interactive Tutorial
- Challenge mode (replaces Championship Tour of the retail game)

=== Challenge Mode ===
This adds a lot to the game and provides a method of increasing your player stats and unlocking additional courses. It includes 100 challenges at each of several different difficulty levels, totaling over 300 different challenges. They include such variations as:

- nearest to the pin
- chip-in
- limited strokes
- single putt
- total distance
- limited time
- competition (vs CPU)
- limited clubs

== Release ==
It is one of the games branded as Touch! Generations in North America.

== Reception ==
Reception

Aggregate scores
Aggregator	Score
GameRankings	(DSi) 80% (DS) 72%
Metacritic	(DSi) 80/100 (DS) 66/100

Review scores
Publication	Score
1Up.com	B−
Electronic Gaming Monthly	7.33/10
Eurogamer	8/10
Famitsu	30/40
Game Informer	7/10
GamePro	3.5/5
GameRevolution	C
GameSpot	6/10
GameSpy	3.5/5
IGN	8/10
Nintendo Power	8/10
Detroit Free Press	2/4
The Sydney Morning Herald	3/5

The DSi version received "favorable" reviews, while the original DS version received "average" reviews according to video game review aggregator platform Metacritic.

On release week, Famitsu gave the game a score of 30 out of 40.
