= Swing Away Golf =

2000 video game

- North American cover art
- Developer: T&E Soft
- Publishers: JP: T&E Soft; NA/EU: Electronic Arts
- Platform: PlayStation 2
- Release: JP: March 23, 2000; NA: October 26, 2000; EU: December 8, 2000
- Genre: Sports (golf)
- Modes: Single-player, multiplayer

Swing Away Golf, known in Japan as Golf Paradise (ゴルフパラダイス, Gorufuparadaisu), is a sports game developed and published by T&E Soft for the PlayStation 2. It was shown as a launch title for the system at the PlayStation Festival in 2000 Electronic Arts' third-party publishing arm EA Distribution acquired publishing rights to the game outside Asia and released the title that same year.

== Gameplay ==
Players have several available gameplay modes such as a story mode along with additional single and multiplayer settings. The game allows players to choose from seven available character models to start a career with. Players do not have a preset skill level for each character, and the game allows players to instead determine their skill with Skill Points to be distributed among the attributes of Distance, Accuracy, Control and Recovery.

== Development ==
In 1999, many third-party developers, including T&E Soft, joined Sony. Not only that but according to IGN, Sony "showed how another winning characteristic that helped to launch it to the top of the console heap". On February 8, 2000, T&E Soft announced a release postponement for the game. The game was announced as a PlayStation 2 launch title in Japan, and was scheduled for release on March 23, 2000, priced at 5,800 yen (around $54 US). The game was later shown at the PlayStation Festival in 2000. Before the game was released in Japan, Sony released the demo of the game via a shady source.

On May 26, 2000, Electronic Arts picked up the publishing rights to the title.

On October 12, 2000, Electronic Arts promoted to advertise the game in the United States. The ad covered a two-page span, where the left three-fourths of the spread shows two golfers at urinals holding golf bags on their backs. The golfer on the left is smaller but has a larger golf bag holding a variety of clubs, while the larger golfer on the right has a tiny bag with only a couple of clubs. The text written in the upper left hand corner of this layout says, "Whoever has the most toys wins." The game was released in the United States on October 26, 2000, the same date as the launch of the PlayStation 2.

== Reception ==
Reception

Aggregate score
Aggregator	Score
Metacritic	78/100

Review scores
Publication	Score
AllGame	3/5
Electronic Gaming Monthly	7.33/10 (Note: Three critics of Electronic Gaming Monthly gave the game each a score of 7.5/10, 8/10, and 6.5/10.)
Famitsu	27/40
Game Informer	7.75/10
GamePro	4/5
GameRevolution	B−
GameSpot	8.7/10
GameSpy	73%
GameZone	9.5/10
IGN	7.3/10
Next Generation	3/5
Official U.S. PlayStation Magazine	3/5

The game received "generally favorable reviews" according to the review aggregation website Metacritic.

IGN member David Zdyrko praised the graphics as "beautiful" for a PS2 game. He stated it was "a lot like Hot Shots Golf with some cool improvements, as well as some minor downfalls." He also stated that it "might not be as great as Hot Shots Golf, but it's a phenomenal golf game nonetheless." GameSpot's Frank Provo said that the Japanese import is "a game whose features and execution could barely be explained by a book, let alone by a review." GameRevolution's G-Wok called the game "a fun little golfer whose attitude and extras keep the game from getting too dull." He did criticize the loading screens and stated that "some problems with minor slowdown and the lack of creative courses are a disappointment, but the game doesn't suffer too greatly." NextGen's Blake Fischer said, "If you want a middle-of-the-road game for your PS2 and you dig golf this might be worth a try, but you're probably better off waiting for Tiger Woods [PGA Tour] 2001." In Japan, Famitsu gave it a score of 27 out of 40.
