= Tiger Woods PGA Tour 13 =

2012 video game

- North American standard edition cover featuring Tiger Woods and Rickie Fowler (European standard edition cover replaces Fowler with Rory McIlroy)
- Developer: EA Tiburon
- Publisher: EA Sports
- Series: PGA Tour
- Platforms: PlayStation 3 Xbox 360
- Release: NA: March 27, 2012; AU: March 29, 2012; EU: March 30, 2012
- Genre: Sports
- Modes: Single-player, multiplayer

Tiger Woods PGA Tour 13 is a sports video game developed by EA Tiburon and published by EA Sports for PlayStation 3 and Xbox 360.

== Game Modes ==
Tiger Woods PGA Tour 13 features a game mode called "Legacy Challenge," where players control Tiger Woods through various points of his life.

== Features ==
Tiger Woods PGA Tour 13 used to allow players to team up with friends in an Online Country Club or to create their own. The Country Club allowed members to earn Status Points and Coins that can be used to play rounds on a downloadable course or to unlock Boost Pin packs for their golfer. The Country Club web site required to provide this functionality was purposefully shut down by EA to encourage upgrade to Tiger Woods PGA Tour 14 and is no longer available.

The Online Country Club featured stat breakdowns to allow members to compare themselves to other members. The Country Club also offered a tournament creation feature for members to compete for the title of Club Champion.

== Reception ==
Reception

Aggregate score
Aggregator	Score	
Aggregator	PS3	Xbox 360
Metacritic	75/100	77/100

Review scores
Publication	Score	
Publication	PS3	Xbox 360
Destructoid	N/A	8/10
Electronic Gaming Monthly	N/A	9/10
Eurogamer	N/A	6/10
Game Informer	8/10	8/10
GameRevolution	N/A	4/5
GameSpot	7/10	6.5/10
GameTrailers	N/A	8.5/10
IGN	6.5/10	6.5/10
Official Xbox Magazine (US)	N/A	7.5/10
PlayStation: The Official Magazine	8/10	N/A
Digital Spy	N/A	4/5
The Guardian	3/5	N/A

Tiger Woods PGA Tour 13 received "generally favorable" reviews, according to review aggregator Metacritic.
