= Hydlide =

1984 video game

- MSX box art
- Developer: T&E Soft
- Publishers: T&E Soft
- Designer: Tokihiro Naito
- Programmer: Eiji Kato
- Composers: Keiichi Maruyama, Shigeru Tomita
- Platform: List: PC-6001, PC-8801, MSX, MSX2, PC-9801, Sharp X1, PC-66, FM-7, Sharp MZ-2000, Famicom/NES, Nintendo Switch
- Release: December 13, 1984: PC-6001, PC-8801; JP: December 13, 1984; MSX; JP: March 1985; FM-7; JP: May 1985; MSX2; JP: July 1985; EU: 1985; PC-9801; JP: November 1985; Famicom/NES; JP: March 18, 1986; NA: June 1989; Switch; WW: December 21, 2023
- Genre: Action role-playing
- Mode: Single-player

Hydlide (Note: Japanese: ハイドライド, Hepburn: Haidoraido) is an action role-playing game developed and published by T&E Soft. It was originally released for the NEC PC-6001 and PC-8801 computers in 1984, in Japan only; ports for the MSX, MSX2, FM-7 and NEC PC-9801 were released the following year. A Nintendo Switch port based on the PC-8801 version was released on December 21, 2023 by D4 Enterprise.

A Famicom version was released under the name Hydlide Special in Japan in 1986. Three years later, it was localized and released in English regions for the Nintendo Entertainment System by Fujisankei Communications International, known as simply Hydlide. The game sold two million copies in Japan across all platforms.

The game spawned the Hydlide series, followed by the sequels Hydlide II: Shine of Darkness in 1985 and Hydlide 3: The Space Memories (Super Hydlide) in 1987. A 1995 remake was released for the Sega Saturn as Virtual Hydlide.

== Plot ==
In the kingdom of Fairyland, three magic jewels were enshrined in the palace to maintain peace in the kingdom. One day, an evil man broke into the palace and stole one of the three magic jewels. Without the third jewel, the two remaining jewels lost their magic sparkle. The magic spell that sealed the power of Varalys, the most vicious demon in the kingdom, was broken. During the turmoil which followed, the last two jewels were stolen. Varalys cast a special magic on Princess Ann, turning her into three fairies, and hid her somewhere in the kingdom. He then let loose a horde of monsters across the land and became the ruler of the kingdom. The young knight Jim stood up and took action to restore peace in the kingdom. He bravely made his way into the wilderness in full armor to fight the monsters.

== Development ==
The game was created by T&E Soft's Tokihiro Naito. His idea behind Hydlide was to mix together action and RPG elements into a new "action RPG" genre. He was inspired by The Tower of Druaga and The Black Onyx, especially the former, as Hydlide's design leans more towards action than role-playing. Hydlide essentially took The Tower of Druaga formula to a colorful open world, and added RPG mechanics. Hydlide also borrowed the health meter mechanic from The Black Onyx, and took it a step further with a regenerating health meter.

Naito noted that he was completely unaware of Western role-playing games like Ultima and Wizardry when he was developing Hydlide, as he had never used the Apple II before. He said that he only became aware of two other Japanese action RPG projects, Dragon Slayer and Courageous Perseus, while reading a magazine during Hydlide's development, and was shocked to find that Hydlide was not the only attempt at the concept. He underestimated Dragon Slayer but felt threatened by Courageous Perseus, believing the latter to be more visually impressive; Courageous Perseus turned out to be not as successful, whereas Dragon Slayer went on to become Hydlide's biggest competitor, through subsequent sequels.

== Reception and legacy ==
Reception (NES version)

Review scores
Publication	Score
Electronic Gaming Monthly	22/40
Computer Entertainer	4.5/8 stars

Original PC-8801 version

Hydlide was well-received and considered an innovator when released in Japan in 1984. Hydlide was one of the first action role-playing games, along with Courageous Perseus and Dragon Slayer. Hydlide was also an early open world game, rewarding exploration in an open world environment. It also had the ability to switch between attack mode and defense mode, quick save and load options which can be used at any moment of the game, and the introduction of a health regeneration mechanic where health slowly regenerates when standing still.

It sold 2 million copies in Japan, including 1 million for home computers (including the PC-88, PC-98, PC-66, Sharp X1, FM7, MSX, MSX2, and MZ-2000) and 1 million for the Famicom console. It was the first computer game to receive a Platinum award from Toshiba EMI for a million sales. However, it failed to capture the same attention beyond Japan.

The game was influential on the action RPG genre, including titles such as Ys. For example, Ys uses a similar health-regeneration mechanic. The recharging health mechanic first introduced by Hydlide in 1984 would, decades later, become a common mechanic widely used in many video games, including shooter games such as Halo. Hydlide's open world game design inspired Hideo Kojima, who designed Metal Gear Solid V: The Phantom Pain so that it captures the open-world feel he felt when he first played Hydlide on PC. PlatinumGames director Hideki Kamiya was inspired by the Hydlide series, which he cited as an influence on Scalebound, a cancelled open world action RPG.

Hydlide was initially released outside of Japan through the European release of the MSX version. Beyond that, 1989 saw the release of a localization of Hydlide Special for the NES, simply titled Hydlide itself. Unlike Dragon Quest, which was improved upon for its US localization, Hydlide was left essentially unaltered beyond minor changes to the title screen and some prompts/messages. In North America, it was compared unfavorably to The Legend of Zelda (1986), which had improved significantly upon Hydlide. The NES version of Hydlide became notorious in the West for its repetitive background music that bears similarity to John Williams' Indiana Jones theme or Disney's It's a Small World After All.

In Electronic Gaming Monthly's 1989 review of the NES version, Ed and Donn each scored it 6/10 while Steve and Jim scored it 5/10. Ed called it a "good" game with "average" graphics and "not too terribly annoying" music, and said it is "a good alternative to Ultima, Zelda, and other quest-oriented" RPGs; Steve said he's "not the biggest fan of RPG type games" and it is "a little tricky to get started" but has "some redeeming features" and many surprises despite "rough" graphics and sound; and Jim said the graphics are "not too good" but considered the gameplay as solid. Retrospective reception of the game has been generally negative in the West.

=== Series ===
Hydlide had several follow-ups:

- Hydlide II: Shine of Darkness was originally released for the NEC PC-8801 in 1985 and then ported to the MSX in Japan. An official English version was released through the Dutch MSX games distribution platform WOOMB.net in late 2006, the first official release outside Japan. The game introduced a morality meter, where the player can be aligned with Justice, Normal, or Evil. Killing humans or good monsters lowers the player's morality, while fighting evil monsters increases it. If the player has an evil alignment, the townsfolk will ignore the player, denying access to certain clues, dialogues, equipment, and training. The game also introduced a time option, allowing the player to speed up or slow down the gameplay.
- Hydlide 3: The Space Memories was released in 1987 for the MSX in Japan; a Family Computer version (with the subtitle 闇からの訪問者 = yami kara no hōmonsha = visitor from darkness) was released in Japan in 1989. The game retains the morality meter of its predecessor and expands the time option with an in-game clock and a need to sleep and eat. The game uses four distinct character classes. This game was also re-released through the Dutch MSX games distribution platform WOOMB.net in late 2006, with an English translation. Super Hydlide is an updated port of Hydlide 3 released for the Sega Genesis/Mega Drive. It was released in Japan in 1989, in North America in 1990, and in Europe in 1991.
- Virtual Hydlide is a 1995 remake of Hydlide, still developed by T&E Soft but released exclusively for the Sega Saturn. It uses pseudo-3D graphics, a live action player character, and a system which creates a new game world for each game by randomly selecting from sets of pre-designed level maps.
