= Super Hydlide =

1987 video game

- European Mega Drive cover art
- Developer: T&E Soft
- Publishers: JP: Asmik; NA: Seismic Software; EU: Sega
- Platforms: MSX, MSX2, PC-8801mkII SR, X1, Famicom, Genesis/Mega Drive, PC-98, X68000, Nintendo Switch
- Release: MSX: JP: 1987; MSX2: JP: 1987; PC-8801: JP: November 22, 1987; X1: JP: 1988; Famicom: JP: February 17, 1989; Mega Drive / Genesis: JP: October 6, 1989; NA: March 1990; EU: 1991; PC-9801: JP: 1989; X68000: JP: 1990; Windows: JP: November 26, 1999; Nintendo Switch: WW: February 22, 2024
- Genre: Action role-playing
- Mode: Single-player

Super Hydlide is an action role-playing game released by T&E Soft for the Genesis/Mega Drive. It was originally released in 1987 in Japan only under the title Hydlide 3: The Space Memories (ハイドライド３ 異次元の思い出, Haidoraido 3: I Jigen No Omoide) for the MSX, MSX2, and PC-8801mkII SR. It's the third game in the Hydlide series. Ports were also released for the X1, Famicom, X68000, Windows, and Nintendo Switch. The game was developed by Hydlide series veterans T&E Soft and released worldwide on the Sega Genesis / Mega Drive on October 6, 1989, in Japan, early 1990 in the United States, and 1991 in Europe. This remake evidences substantial graphical upgrades to the original Hydlide 3, though the gameplay remains largely identical. Before its release, it was called Hollo Fighter in some Sega advertising material and was one of the first third party published titles to be released in the U.S., the other being Air Diver.

== Plot ==
Many years after the events of Hydlide II, an explosion of flames appeared near The City of the Woods. After that, monsters spread throughout the world. A young man is chosen to find the source of the evil.

== Gameplay ==
The game incorporates a 'good/evil character' morality/alignment system. Like its predecessor Hydlide II: Shine of Darkness (1985), the player has a morality meter that can be aligned with either Justice, Normal, or Evil. The game has both good and evil monsters. Evil monsters attack the player character on sight, while good monsters only attack if the player character attacks them first. Killing any monster, good or evil, results in a reward of experience points, money, and occasionally a piece of equipment. However, if the player kills a good monster, points are lost from a statistic called "MF" (Moral Fiber). If the player's MF stat drops to zero, frequent traps will appear across the world. If the player manages to keep it over 100, rewards appear in the form of random items found around Fairyland. Unlike Hydlide II, the morality meter no longer affects the way in which the townsfolk react to the player.

The game also features an in-game clock setting day-night cycles, where the character must eat two times a day and sleep regularly. If the characters stay up late or fail to eat regularly, their HP and attack power gradually drop. Every item in the game (including money) has weight. If the total weight of items the player character carries exceeds their "Load Capacity" (LC), they will move slowly. The game uses cut scenes for its opening and ending sequences, a combat system similar to Ys, a choice between four distinct character classes, and a wide variety of equipment and spells.

== Reception ==
Reception

Review score
Publication	Score
Electronic Gaming Monthly	4/10, 6/10, 4/10, 6/10 (GEN)

GamePro gave a positive review, citing the varied experiences offered by the different playable characters, the morality system, and the inclusion of four save slots.

Computer and Video Games scored it 81%, stating that, like Phantasy Star II, "this is a huge role-playing game", and that it is "a very tough game" which requires a strategy. They criticized the graphics and sound, but were positive to the gameplay. They recommended it to those who like games with steady pace and puzzles despite lacking the action.

== Legacy ==
In 2007, Alex Lucard of Diehard GameFan listed Super Hydlide at number 27 in his list of top 30 RPGs. He cited the realism instilled by gameplay mechanics such as the encumbrance system, banks, the 24-hour clock, and the need to eat and sleep, and described the game as "Morrowind before there was Morrowind".

During production of Scalebound, PlatinumGames director Hideki Kamiya said he was inspired by Hydlide 3 on the PC-8801 MA as well as Sorcerian. He said Hydlide 3 was one of the first games he played on a PC and was inspirational because it had a hardcore game design that no one was doing on consoles at the time.
