= True Golf Classics: Pebble Beach Golf Links =

1992 video game

- Japanese Super Famicom cover art
- Developer: T&E Soft
- Publishers: Super NES: T&E Soft; Sega Genesis: Sega
- Composer: Yumi Kinoshita
- Series: True Golf
- Platforms: Super Nintendo Entertainment System; NEC PC-9801; Sega Genesis
- Release: Super NES: JP: April 10, 1992; NA: April 1992; EU: 1992; Sega Genesis: JP: October 29, 1993; EU: September 23, 1994; NA: 1994
- Genre: Traditional golf simulation
- Modes: Single-player, multiplayer

True Golf Classics: Pebble Beach Golf Links (Note: Known in Japan as New 3D Golf Simulation: Peburubīchi no hatō (Japanese: New 3D Golf Simulation: ペブルビーチの波濤; lit. New 3D Golf Simulation: Storm Wave of Pebble Beach)) is a traditional golf simulation video game that was originally released in 1992 for the Super Nintendo Entertainment System. It was eventually released in 1993 to the Sega Genesis and the NEC PC-9801. It is part of T&E Soft's True Golf series.

The game takes place at the prestigious Pebble Beach Golf Links in Pebble Beach, California.

== Gameplay ==
The golfing engine is very complex and it takes many button pushes on the game pad in order to deliver a single stroke. There is match play, stroke play, and a tournament mode. Anywhere from one to four players can play at once.

== Reception ==
Reception

Review score
Publication	Score
Electronic Gaming Monthly	7/10, 7/10, 6/10, 5/10 (GEN)

In Electronic Gaming Monthly, two reviewers said it was one of the few golf games on the Genesis that felt that it added more than the usual elements of choosing butters, power of shot and wind resistance. The other two reviewers felt it was still in line of being a standard and typical golf game.

== See also ==
- Pebble Beach Golf Links
