= Microsoft Golf 1999 Edition =

1998 video game

- Developer: Friendly Software
- Publisher: Microsoft
- Series: Microsoft Golf
- Platform: Microsoft Windows
- Release: NA: November 1998
- Genre: Sports
- Modes: Single-player; Multiplayer

Microsoft Golf 1999 Edition is a golf video game developed by American studio Friendly Software and published by Microsoft for Microsoft Windows. It was released in the United States in November 1998. It is the fifth game in the Microsoft Golf series, following Microsoft Golf 1998 Edition, which was also developed by Friendly Software.

Some critics noted similarities between the game and its predecessor. It was praised for its variety of options, although critics believed it was not as good as other golfing games. The game was the best-selling computer sports game of 1999, with 154,741 copies sold. It was followed by Microsoft Golf 2001 Edition.

== Gameplay ==
Microsoft Golf 1999 Edition is similar to its predecessor, Microsoft Golf 1998 Edition. Improvements include more realistic chipping, better Internet support, and additional options for customization. The game features seven courses, including the following four from the previous game: The Links, and Teeth of the Dog, both at Casa de Campo in the Dominican Republic; and Lake Michigan's Bay Harbor Golf Club, and The Preserve 9 at Bay Harbor. Among the new courses is the Donald Ross Memorial in Harbor Springs, Michigan, featuring different course holes designed by Donald Ross. The other new courses are Eagle Heights, a fantasy valley/woodland course set somewhere in the Pacific Northwest; and Medalist Golf Club, in Hobe Sound, Florida. Courses include various weather options relating to sky, wind, ground, and fog conditions. Five game modes are featured: Bingo Bango Bongo, match, scramble, skins, and stroke.

The player is presented with a choice of 18 golf clubs, and can also customize the physical strengths and design of the onscreen golfer character. Included are two male models and two female models. The game has four golf swing methods, all previously featured in Microsoft Golf 1998 Edition. These include two-click and three-click swing methods, as well as Natural Swing and Sim Swing; the former uses computer mouse motion to execute the swing, while the latter option has the game make the swing on behalf of the player. The player can choose to take mulligans and gimmes. David Feherty provides commentary on the player's golfing. The game includes several multiplayer options, and also supported Microsoft's Internet Gaming Zone at the time of its release.

== Reception ==
Reception

Review scores
Publication	Score
AllGame	3/5
CNET Gamecenter	6/10
Computer Games Strategy Plus	2.5/5
GamePro	2.5/5 (Note: GamePro gave the game 3.5/5 for graphics, 3/5 for sound, and two 2.5/5 scores for control and overall fun factor.)
GameSpot	7.5/10
IGN	7.4/10
PC Accelerator	4/10
PCMag	3/5
The Cincinnati Enquirer	2/4
USA Today	2/4

Some critics noted similarities between Microsoft Golf 1999 Edition and its predecessor, believing that the biggest difference between the two was the addition of three new courses and some minor improvements. According to T. Liam McDonald of GameSpot, the game followed "the current trend among sports games of publishing a new edition every year and only revamping the whole system every couple years." Jeff Lackey of Computer Games Strategy Plus considered the game to be more of a course add-on package for Microsoft Golf 1998 Edition, while PC Accelerator wrote that the game "is not a sequel so much as an expansion disc" for its predecessor; the magazine further stated that none of the game's minor improvements had a significant change on the overall game. Critics believed that the game was a good value when taking into consideration a rebate offer, which was available to consumers who purchased the previous Microsoft Golf game.

The game's interface was praised as was the multiplayer and the variety of options. However, critics generally believed that there were better golfing games available, such as the Links series, the Jack Nicklaus series, and the Tiger Woods PGA Tour series. Lackey praised the golfer customization options, but concluded that there was "no good reason to pick this retread" over other golf games such as Links LS 1999 and Tiger Woods 99 PGA Tour Golf. Daniel Morris of GamePro also considered the game average and believed that Links LS 1999 was superior. Mike Snider of USA Today called it a "serviceable golf sim that doesn't make the cut". James Bottorff of The Cincinnati Enquirer wrote that other than the title, "it's hard to find anything different between this game and the countless other golf titles on the market."

Gordon Goble of CNET Gamecenter believed it to be a reasonable choice for computer golfers considering its array of game options, but he also felt that there were better golf games available, as did Michael L. House of AllGame. House wrote that Microsoft Golf 1999 Edition has "too many irritating little bugs," including an issue in which the game was not accurately aware of the golfer's location on the course. With the game's improvements over its predecessors, McDonald considered the Microsoft Golf series to now be the third best golf game series, behind Links and Jack Nicklaus. Trent C. Ward of IGN felt that other golfing games were superior in nearly every aspect, but concluded that the game was an "excellent choice for those looking for a quick and easy golf game without all the frills." Brian R. Fitzgerald of The Wall Street Journal considered it a good game for beginners.

The game uses DirectDraw for graphics rendering. Some critics considered the graphics to be average. McDonald believed that the courses were "detailed and finely rendered" but not as good as those featured in the Links and Jack Nicklaus games. He stated that the golfers "appear smoother, more realistic, and more fluid than ever." Sports Gaming Network praised the graphics but considered those of Links LS 1999 to be superior, while mentioning that the golfers had "more fluidity" than any other golf game. Ward considered the graphics good but average, while stating that objects in the game suffered from "cardboard cutout syndrome." Goble praised the graphics but believed that the game felt "stagnant" in some way: "Perhaps it's the hardened flags, static water, and spray-less sand traps, or the animation-free background and muted colors. Maybe it's the lack of viewing options--three in all, only two of which are available at any one time. Whatever it is, it's not easy to decipher wind direction or judge distances--all in all a disconcerting feel." House considered the graphics to be very good for the most part, but he stated that they had an artificial feel. He further wrote, "It's disconcerting to see the flag on the green point one way when the wind meter is showing a strong breeze coming from the other direction."

The ball physics received some criticism. Lackey felt that the physics were acceptable but not as good as rival golf games. Sports Gaming Network considered the physics above average and realistic, but also not entirely convincing. Fitzgerald praised the club and ball physics, calling them "remarkably realistic, a tough feat for a lot of golf games." For the swing methods, Ward felt that the Sim Swing was too complex but wrote that the Natural Swing "proved to be very cool indeed." Goble considered the click-swing methods unnatural and frustrating, but called the Natural Swing "intriguing." PC Accelerator felt that the swing meter was difficult to use. Snider called it a good game for beginners because of its Sim Swing feature. Sports Gaming Network considered the Sim Swing method boring, but praised the Natural Swing as an "easy to learn/tough to master" option. McDonald was disappointed that the game, unlike earlier Microsoft Golf games, is not compatible with courses from Links add-on disks. Sports Gaming Network was disappointed with the number of courses, but considered each of them to be impressive, and further stated that the game seemed to have the fastest loading times of any golf game available. Ward also praised the courses.

The sound received some praise, although PC Accelerator also questioned how important sounds really are in a golf game. Morris considered the sound effects to be basic and wrote that the game was "a flat experience for the ears," stating that it lacked the "aural flair" of its competitors. Fitzgerald stated that the sound effects included "weird moos and all sorts of animal cackles" as if each course was set on a farm. Goble considered the ambient sounds varied and enjoyable, but also "a bit bird-heavy." He felt that the commentary was "arrogant and error-filled." McDonald considered Feherty's shot-specific commentary good but stated that his "color commentary is hollow and annoying." House noted an issue in which Feherty sometimes stuttered his commentary, while Bottorff stated that Feherty's commentary was "in perfect tune with the progression of the game." Sports Gaming Network praised the commentary.

Microsoft Golf 1999 Edition was the best-selling computer sports game of 1999, with 154,741 copies sold, equaling a total of approximately $3.1 million in revenue.
