= Microsoft Golf 1998 Edition =

1998 video game

- Developer: Friendly Software
- Publisher: Microsoft
- Series: Microsoft Golf
- Platform: Windows
- Release: NA: May 12, 1998
- Genre: Sports
- Modes: Single-player, multiplayer

Microsoft Golf 1998 Edition is a 1998 golf video game developed by American studio Friendly Software and published by Microsoft for Windows. It is the fourth game in the Microsoft Golf series, following Microsoft Golf 3.0. The design is substantially different from its predecessors.

Some critics considered the game to be a significant improvement, especially the graphics. The game ranked 232nd for computer game sales during 1998. It was followed by Microsoft Golf 1999 Edition.

== Gameplay ==
Microsoft Golf 1998 Edition features four golf courses: The Links, and Teeth of the Dog, both at Casa de Campo in the Dominican Republic; and Lake Michigan's Bay Harbor Golf Club, and The Preserve 9 at Bay Harbor. The latter is a 9-hole course, while the other three each contain 18 holes. The game features five game modes: Bingo Bango Bongo, match, scramble, skins, and stroke. Four golf swing methods are featured, including Natural Swing and Sim Swing; the former method uses the motion of a computer mouse to simulate the swing, while the latter option has the game take the swing for the player, who has no involvement in the process. The game also features regular two-click and three-click swing methods that are common to golfing games.

The player can also choose pin placement, and has a variety of camera angles and replay options. Wind and weather can also be customized. The game includes commentary from David Feherty, who reacts to the player's golfing. Ten golfer models are featured, including males and females of varying skin tones, and the player can use a variety of options to customize the character. The game supports multiplayer for up to four players, with various options such as LAN and Microsoft's Internet Gaming Zone.

== Development ==
The previous games in the Microsoft Golf series are basic versions of the Links games by Access Software. Microsoft and Access Software ended their partnership in 1996, when the latter began developing Links for Windows, putting it in direct competition with Microsoft Golf. For Microsoft Golf 1998 Edition, Microsoft chose Friendly Software to develop the game, which uses a revamped design that is substantially different from its predecessors. Friendly Software previously developed Greg Norman Ultimate Challenge Golf, and Microsoft Golf 1998 Edition uses the same game engine. The game uses DirectDraw for graphics rendering.

== Release and marketing ==
The game was published by Microsoft in the United States in May 1998. That month, Microsoft and company Eddie Bauer partnered to promote Microsoft Golf 1998 Special Edition, a basic version of the game featuring only the Preserve 9 course. It was created specifically for Eddie Bauer. The Eddie Bauer logo and website are featured in the game, which was given away to Eddie Bauer customers who purchased merchandise costing $75 or more. A basic demo version of the full game, titled Microsoft Golf 1998 Lite and featuring only the Preserve 9 course, was included with Microsoft Plus! 98 upon its release in June 1998.

In August 1998, Microsoft hosted a promotional media event at Washington's Museum of Flight, coinciding with the 1998 PGA Championship being held in the state, where Microsoft was headquartered. The event, titled "Battle in Seattle", was a three-hole matchup between professional golfers Craig Stadler and Michelle McGann, who competed against each other in the game. The event included a jumbo screen to watch the match, as well as 10 computers featuring demo versions of the game. The event garnered only about 80 people, below Microsoft's expectations. Media attendees included ESPN and Fox Sports, in addition to several PGA Tour players.

== Reception ==
Reception

Review scores
Publication	Score
AllGame	3.5/5
Computer Games Strategy Plus	3.5/5
Computer Gaming World	3/5
GameSpot	8.4/10
Chicago Tribune	3/4
Gamecenter	7/10
Sports Gaming Network	85/100

Some critics considered Microsoft Golf 1998 Edition to be a significant improvement over its predecessors. Stephen Poole of GameSpot wrote that "the only way you'd know it had anything to do with the previous versions is from the name." Scott A. May of Computer Gaming World praised the game for retaining "the polished, user-friendly feel of the previous versions, but little else." He stated that veteran fans of the series would be surprised by Microsoft Golf 1998 Edition, while people who ignored its predecessors for their lack of depth "finally have a reason to take another look" at the series. Gordon Goble of Gamecenter stated that nearly everything about the series had been changed for the better with the release of Microsoft Golf 1998 Edition. Paul Rosano of Hartford Courant called it "a worthwhile and successful, albeit overdue, upgrade."

The graphics were praised, although some critics still considered them inferior when compared to Links LS 1998 and Jack Nicklaus 5. Poole considered the graphics to be "the biggest area of improvement," stating that they were nearly as good as the latest Links and Jack Nicklaus games. May praised the video-captured golfers for being seamlessly blended into the foreground. Other critics praised the golfer animations as well, but were disappointed by the golfers' lack of pre- and post-shot reactions. Goble particularly praised the aerial previews of each hole, considering them to be the best of any golf game.

May called the sounds on the course "outstanding" but stated that some sounds "seem to be missing," such as the ball hitting the pin or splashing into water. Nick Smith of AllGame considered the sounds to be "very realistic" and stated that they "do not get in the way of the gameplay as they sometimes do in other golf games." Goble criticized the ambient audio for including "annoying, perpetually chirping birds and crickets". Doug Pierce of Sports Gaming Network criticized the audio for its lack of variety and its repetitive sounds of birds and sprinklers. Smith enjoyed the commentary and called it "relevant and even sympathetic at times". May believed the commentary to be superfluous, while Poole stated that the commentary "isn't particularly humorous or helpful". Goble stated that the commentary was rarely accurate in its reaction to the player's golfing.

Some criticized the game's click-swing methods for requiring fast responses from the player. May considered the array of swing methods to be "by far the most impressive" of the game's options. He also praised the pin placement option for significantly increasing the game's long-term playability. Dennis Lynch of the Chicago Tribune considered the Natural Swing "anything but natural," although he praised the various game options and the Internet Gaming Zone feature. Jeff Lackey of Computer Games Strategy Plus praised the multitude of game options, noting that some of them were not yet offered by rival golfing games. May praised the "clean" interface, while Poole praised it for providing quick access to parts of the game.

Rosano praised the courses, including Teeth of the Dragon, as a "big plus," while stating they were all "expertly rendered." May was disappointed that the game, unlike its predecessors, is not compatible with courses from the Links series or the earlier Microsoft Golf games. Poole was also disappointed by the limited course selection, and the lack of an off-line tournament mode. Goble believed that the four available courses provided adequate variety, although he criticized some gameplay inconsistencies and errors, and stated that the distance to the golf hole can be "extremely deceiving" at times. In comparison to rival golf games, Goble called Microsoft Golf 1998 Edition a "promising amateur in a world of seasoned veterans." He concluded that it was too flawed to "heartily recommend," stating that at best, it was an "interesting alternative" in the genre of computer golf. Rosano concluded that the game was best for casual players, stating that there were better golf simulations available for hardcore players. Sales of the game were poor; among computer games, Microsoft Golf 1998 Edition ranked 232nd for sales during 1998.
