= Microsoft Golf 2001 Edition =

2000 video game

- Developer: Microsoft
- Publisher: Microsoft
- Artist: Neil Galloway
- Series: Microsoft Golf
- Platform: Windows
- Release: NA: August 24, 2000
- Genre: Sports
- Modes: Single-player, multiplayer

Microsoft Golf 2001 Edition is a 2000 golf video game developed and published by Microsoft for Microsoft Windows. It is the final game in the Microsoft Golf series, and the successor to Microsoft Golf 1999 Edition. It uses the same game engine as Links LS 2000 (1999), part of Microsoft's Links series of golf games.

Microsoft Golf 2001 Edition was marketed as a basic golf game with limited features, intended for casual players and beginners. It received "mixed or average reviews" according to Metacritic, with some praise going towards the game's graphics and high resolution. Some critics noted similarities between the game and Links LS 2000, and believed that it would appeal to its target demographic.

== Gameplay ==
Microsoft Golf 2001 Edition is similar to Links LS 2000, and features seven courses, most of which are already featured in previous Links games and add-on disks. Courses include Bighorn in California; Bountiful Golf Club and Entrada at Snow Canyon, both in Utah; Kapalua Plantation and Mauna Kea, both in Hawaii; Sea Island Golf Club in Georgia; and the fictional Three Canyons red rock course. Courses include varying obstacles and conditions relating to wind, fog, and cloud coverage.

Microsoft Golf 2001 Edition features ten game modes, five of which are absent from Links LS 2000. Modes include match, Nassau, scramble, skins, and stroke. The game also offered multiplayer through MSN Gaming Zone. The game includes three playable golf characters, and more can be custom-made by the player. The game has three swing methods, including Easy Swing and PowerStroke, both previously featured in Links LS 2000. The PowerStroke uses computer mouse motion to simulate the swing. The game includes commentary in response to golf shots. The player can take mulligans and gimmes, and can utilize various camera angles to aid in golfing. Grid lines can be placed on the course to aid in putting.

== Development and release ==
Microsoft Golf 2001 was developed and published by Microsoft, which owned the rights to the Links series. Microsoft Golf 2001 Edition uses the same game engine as the 1999 game Links LS 2000. In North America, Microsoft Golf 2001 Edition was released for Microsoft Windows on August 24, 2000. It was marketed as a basic golf game with limited features, intended for casual players and beginners.

== Reception ==
Reception

Aggregate score
Aggregator	Score
Metacritic	72/100

Review scores
Publication	Score
AllGame	2.5/5
Computer Games Magazine	3/5
GameSpot	7.4/10
GameZone	8.5/10
IGN	7.7/10
Gamecenter	8/10
Sports Gaming Network	75/100

Microsoft Golf 2001 Edition received "mixed or average reviews" according to Metacritic. Some critics viewed Microsoft Golf 2001 Edition as a basic version of the Links games; several noted similarities between the game and Links LS 2000 in particular. Kevin Rice of Daily Radar considered it a "continuation of Links LS 2000 with very minor changes," but stated that this was "not really a bad thing". Brett Todd of Computer Games Magazine called the game "really nothing more than a repackaged Links LS 2000 offered at a bargain basement price," while stating that this "is both good and bad."

Critics considered the game a good value at $20, and believed it would appeal to its target demographic of casual players, rather than hardcore golfers. Considering its low price, Todd believed the game could have appeal for some people, but not for most, stating that nearly all of its good points had been eclipsed by other golf games. Stephen Poole of GameSpot called the game an "attractive package" for its variety of terrain and "excellent" course design.

Some praise went to the graphics and the high resolution. Shawn Nicholls of AllGame considered the courses to be "blatantly artificial", and "inconsistent" with the appearance of the golfer, while Gordon Goble of Gamecenter felt that the golfer characters could have been better animated. Sports Gaming Network considered the graphics to be good, but dated. Nicholls praised the sound, commentary, and music, while Scott Steinberg of IGN criticized the commentary for occurring a few seconds too soon or too late in reaction to golf shots. Michael Lafferty of GameZone was disappointed by how limited the commentary was, and Poole stated that the commentary was "delivered as if the speaker had just finished walking 27 holes."

Despite a few minor deficiencies, Lafferty praised Microsoft Golf 2001 Edition for its simple gameplay and called it "the golf game that will enable families to play together and give the newer players a chance to succeed." Rice considered the game to be realistic, while Nicholls stated that computer golfers expecting a realistic and challenging experience would be disappointed by the game. Steinberg stated that lifelong golfers should stick to the Links games, as Microsoft Golf 2001 Edition "lacks serious challenge." Steinberg called the game "a lot more user friendly and less intimidating for newly baptized proponents of the sport." Sports Gaming Network criticized the lack of an off-line tournament mode, a feature that was present in Links LS 2000. Todd considered the game to be dated, but also "good in a 1997-98 sort of way," while calling it a "reasonably deep simulation of golf."

Some criticized the grid lines for being difficult and unhelpful. The PowerStroke swing method was also criticized. Nicholls stated that the game seemed "impossible and frustrating" when using the PowerStroke, and Sports Gaming Network considered the PowerStroke awkward to use. Goble criticized the PowerStroke icon's location onscreen: "It is, for some wacky reason, located right at the base of the screen, in almost exactly the same spot where the game's hidden menu panel is activated. We cannot count the number of times we accidentally triggered that menu when all we wanted to do was make a damn shot."
