= Dover (disambiguation) =

Dover is a port town in Kent, in South East England.

Dover may also refer to:

== Places ==
=== Australia ===
- Dover, Tasmania
- Dover Island (Tasmania)
- Dover Heights, Sydney

=== Canada ===
- Dover, Calgary, Alberta
- Dover, Newfoundland and Labrador
- Dover, Nova Scotia
- Port Dover, Ontario
- Little Dover, Nova Scotia

=== Singapore ===
- Dover, Singapore
  - Dover MRT station

=== United Kingdom ===
- Dover, Kent
  - Dover (UK Parliament constituency)
  - Dover District
  - Strait of Dover
  - White Cliffs of Dover
  - Port of Dover, a cross-channel port in South East England
- Dover, Greater Manchester, a location

=== United States ===
- Dover, Arkansas
- Dover, Delaware, the state capital
  - Dover Air Force Base
  - Bally's Dover, formerly Dover Downs, horse harness racing track
  - Dover Motor Speedway, a NASCAR race track located at Bally's Dover
- Dover, Florida
- Dover, Georgia
- Dover, Idaho
- Dover, Illinois
- Dover, Indiana
- Dover, Boone County, Indiana
- Dover, Kansas
- Dover, Kentucky
- Dover, Maine, merged with Foxcroft since 1922 to form a single town
- Dover, Massachusetts, a New England town
  - Dover (CDP), Massachusetts, the urban portion of the town
- Dover, Minnesota
- Dover, Missouri
- Dover, New Hampshire
- Dover, New Jersey
- Dover, New York
- Dover, North Carolina
- Dover, Ohio
- Dover, Oklahoma
- Dover, Pennsylvania, involved in the Dover trial
- Dover, Tennessee
- Dover, Utah, a ghost town
- Dover, Vermont
- Dover, Virginia
- Dover, Buffalo County, Wisconsin, a town
- Dover, Price County, Wisconsin, an unincorporated community
- Dover, Racine County, Wisconsin, a town
- Dover Plains, New York
- Dover Township (disambiguation) (any of several townships)

== People ==
- Dover (surname), a surname of Celtic origin appearing in English and German names

== Arts and entertainment ==
- Dover (film), a 1943 WWII documentary short
- Dover (band), a Spanish rock band
- The Dovers, American garage-rock band

== Buildings ==
- Dover Castle, Kent, England
- Dover House, a Grade I listed building in Whitehall, London

== Companies ==
- Dover Corporation, a diversified industrial manufacturer
- Dover Publications, American publisher of books and, for a time, classical records
- Dover Records, an English popular record label

== Government and law ==
- Dover (UK Parliament constituency), the Parliamentary constituency that includes Dover, England
- Kitzmiller v. Dover Area School District, a court case

== Transportation and vehicles ==
- Dover (truck), a make of truck owned by the Hudson Motor Car Company, Detroit
- Dover station (MBTA), a closed station on the MBTA Orange Line
- Dover station (NJ Transit), train station in Dover, New Jersey
- Dover Transit Center, bus terminal in Dover, Delaware
- Dover Transportation Center, train station in Dover, New Hampshire
- HMS Dover, the designation of several Royal Navy ships

== Other uses ==
- Baron Dover, a British Peerage
- Dover sole (disambiguation), two species of flatfish
- Dover Athletic, a football club based in Dover
- Xerox Dover, an early laser printer

== See also ==
- Dovre Municipality, Norway
- Dovre (village), Norway
- White Cliffs of Dover (disambiguation)
