= Links 2001 =

2000 video game

- Developers: Access Software; Microsoft Games Group
- Publisher: Microsoft
- Designer: Bruce Carver
- Artist: Eric Parkinson
- Composer: Matt Heider (Next Level Music)
- Series: Links
- Platforms: Windows; macOS
- Release: NA: October 2000
- Genre: Sports
- Modes: Single-player, multiplayer

Links 2001 is a golf-based sports simulation game developed by Access Software and Microsoft Games Group and published by Microsoft. It is part of the Links series and follows Links LS 2000. It is the first game in the series to include a golf course designer, allowing the player to create custom courses and drops “LS” from the name. It also features Arnold Palmer, Sergio García, and Annika Sörenstam as playable golfers.

It was released for Microsoft Windows in October 2000, and received "generally favorable reviews" according to Metacritic. Critics praised the graphics, game physics, and the addition of a course designer, but the game's voice-overs were criticized, particularly those of García and Sörenstam. The game sold an estimated 240,000 copies in the United States. A version of Links Championship Edition for Mac released on July 26, 2002, which ended up becoming the final Links game released on Mac.

Links Expansion Pack, released in May 2001, offers additional features for the game. Links Championship Edition, released in September 2001, consists of Links 2001 and the expansion pack. The game was succeeded by Links 2003, as “Links 2002” was skipped for unknown reasons.

== Gameplay ==
Links 2001 features five real golf courses: Aviara Golf Club (California), Chateau Whistler (Canada), Old Course at St Andrews (Scotland), Prince Course at Princeville Resort (Hawaii), and Westfields Golf Club (Virginia). A fictional sixth course, called Mesa Roja, features a red rock desert environment meant to be somewhere in the southwestern United States. The game includes informational videos of each course. A course converter allows courses from the Links LS games to be played in Links 2001. Courses from Microsoft Golf 2001 Edition can also be made compatible.

The game features 14 golfers, including Arnold Palmer, Sergio García, and Annika Sörenstam, and the player can choose to make their golfer left-handed. The on-screen golfer makes comments in reaction to the player's golfing. The player can create new golf characters with various customization options, which include the golfer's appearance. The player can also customize the golfing clubs. The player chooses from three different golf swing methods: Easy, Classic (traditional two-click and three-click methods), and the complex PowerStroke. The swing meter can be moved around to any location on the screen. When putting, a grid overlay aids the player, and includes varying colors to help determine terrain differences.

Links 2001 features 46 game modes, including Bingo Bango Bongo, match, scramble, skins, and stroke. Rather than a set of default tournaments, the player creates their own custom tournaments, with up to 63 computer-controlled opponents. The game also includes the Mode of Play Designer, which allows the player to edit the existing game modes. Additionally, the game's Arnold Palmer Course Designer allows the player to create custom golf courses. The designer includes over 1,000 textures, and additional textures can be imported. The player can also create custom sound effects for the game and can import sound scripts from previous Links games. The game also offers 3D video support. Upon its release, the game featured three multiplayer options: modem play, Microsoft Gaming Zone, and the online Links Tour. Online tournaments were also offered through the Virtual Golf Association.

== Development and release ==
Links 2001 was developed by Microsoft, and uses a revamped graphics engine and new game physics over its predecessors. The greens in the game were created through 500 GPS points taken on the actual golf courses. Microsoft described the game as "the most comprehensive upgrade to the series since Links: The Challenge of Golf was introduced ten years ago". Links 2001 is the first game in the Links series to include a course designer. The Arnold Palmer Course Designer is the same tool used by the development team to create the six included courses. García and Sörenstam provided their voices to the game, and Sörenstam is the first LPGA golfer to be featured in the Links series. Links 2001 was completed in mid-October 2000. It was published for Microsoft Windows and was released in the United States at the end of the month. The game was published by Microsoft as a set of four CDs. The course converter was released in January 2001.

An expansion pack with additional features, titled Links Expansion Pack, was announced in February 2001 and was released in late May. A patch for Links 2001 was released in June 2001, offering various corrections. Links Championship Edition, consisting of Links 2001 and the expansion pack, was released for Windows in September 2001, and a Macintosh version was published the following year by Bold. Links Expansion Pack Volume 2 was released in November 2001, and is compatible with Links 2001 and Links Championship Edition. Among its new features are additional courses and golfers.

== Reception ==
Reception

Aggregate score
Aggregator	Score
Metacritic	86/100

Review scores
Publication	Score
AllGame	3/5
Computer Games Magazine	4.5/5
Computer Gaming World	4/5
Eurogamer	8/10
GameSpot	8.7/10
GameSpy	92/100
GameZone	4/10
IGN	8.5/10
PC Gamer (UK)	88%
PC Gamer (US)	91%
PC Zone	7/10
Gamecenter	9/10
Hartford Courant	9/10
Sports Gaming Network	90/100

Award
Publication	Award
Software and Information Industry Association	Codie Awards (Best Sports Game; 2001)

Links 2001 received "generally favorable reviews" according to Metacritic. Critics considered it an improvement over its predecessors, including Links LS 2000. Some considered it the best golf simulation available, while others felt that PGA Championship Golf 2000 was a superior game. Keith Pullin of PC Zone wrote that "only the most loyal of Links fans will actually notice any difference" between Links 2001 and its predecessors.

The graphics were generally praised and considered the best in the Links series up to that time. Stephen Poole of GameSpot called it the best-looking golf simulation available at the time. However, IGN's Dan Adams considered the graphics and the golfer animations to be lifeless. Eurogamer stated that the golfers were "superbly done," but that they "can appear a little false and fuzzy around the edges when set against some of the course backgrounds." Alan Lackey of Computer Games Magazine stated that the golfers "look more natural to their surroundings and no longer have the appearance of being pasted into the scene."

The inclusion of a long-awaited course designer was praised and viewed as a significant addition to the series, although some critics noted its complexity. Michael L. House of AllGame wrote that "the ludicrously uninformative and hopelessly inept documentation in the manual and online instructional help doesn't remotely provide enough data for the casual gamer to even begin to complete a playable course within a reasonable time period." However, Steve Brown of PC Gamer felt that the course designer was easy to use.

The voice-overs were criticized as being repetitive and of poor quality, particularly those of García and Sörenstam. Eurogamer praised the audio, especially the sound of crowd murmuring. Sports Gaming Network complained of missing and delayed sound effects, and wrote about the audio, "What has always been a strong point in the series has actually gotten a little worse." The game physics were mostly praised, although Pullin considered them to be poor, and also felt that the PowerStroke method was too complex. Some critics noted game installation issues and video card compatibility problems, as well as the large installation size of more than one gigabyte. Some criticized the lack of changeable shirt colors for the golfers.

House was disappointed that the game did not release simultaneously with the course converter, and also noted various game glitches. John Brandon of GameZone felt that the game was bloated with too many features. He criticized the game's sluggish pace and wrote that the game takes golf and realism "way too seriously," stating, "I don't want to play actual golf, I want to play simulated golf."

In 2001, the game won a Codie Award for Best Sports Game from the Software and Information Industry Association. During the 4th Annual Interactive Achievement Awards (now known as the D.I.C.E. Awards), Links 2001 was nominated in the categories of "PC Simulation", "PC Sports", "PC Game of the Year", and "Game of the Year", but lost all of them. The game was tied with Madden NFL 2001 for a fourth-place ranking in the 2001 PC Sports Game Writers' Poll, conducted by Hartford Courant and CTNow.

Links 2001 was the ninth best-selling computer sports game of 2000, with 87,521 copies sold. Ultimately, the game sold an estimated 240,000 copies in the United States.

=== Links Championship Edition ===
Reception

Review scores
Publication	Score
Inside Mac Games	6.5/10
MacAddict	4/5
Macworld	3.5/5

Several critics reviewed the Macintosh version of Links Championship Edition. Peter Cohen of Macworld called the game "a startlingly realistic simulation of golfing," but stated that its "complex interface may make it daunting for casual duffers." Niko Coucouvanis of MacAddict wrote that non-golfing fanatics would be bored by the game. Eddie Park of Inside Mac Games praised the variety of options and recommended the game for hardcore golfers, but noted "a minimum of animation, a lack of sound," and graphics that "look flat and dated".

The Windows version sold an estimated 100,000 copies in the United States.
