= MicroProse Golf =

1991 video game

- Amiga cover art
- Developer: The Thought Train
- Publisher: MicroProse
- Programmers: Lee Hodgson; Mark Davies
- Composer: Justin Scharovona
- Platforms: Amiga, Atari ST, MS-DOS
- Release: Amiga, Atari ST: UK: 1991; MS-DOS; US/UK: 1992
- Genre: Sports
- Modes: Single-player, Multiplayer

MicroProse Golf is a golf video game developed by The Thought Train and published by MicroProse. It was released in 1991 for Amiga and Atari ST. In 1992, an enhanced MS-DOS version, featuring golf instructor David Leadbetter, was released in the United States as David Leadbetter's Greens and in the United Kingdom as David Leadbetter's Golf. The game's variety was praised, and some critics considered it the best golf game available.

== Gameplay ==
MicroProse Golf includes six golf courses. It features 11 game modes, including medal play, skins, four-ball golf, and foursome. The game features typical golf obstacles, including trees, water, and sand. Onscreen icons show the strength and direction of the wind, which can also affect the player's golfing. Other icons represent various options available to the player. Among the options is the ability to position the golfer's feet. The player can also make the golfer left-handed or right-handed, and can choose the color of the golfer's jersey. The player can also adjust the height and position of the tee, and can choose between using yards or meters for distance measurements.

The game includes a driving range and a putting green where the player can practice, and various handicap options are available to the player. The player can also refer to an overhead map of the course that can be viewed from different angles. The golf swing meter is represented through two circular-shaped bars. The player can choose to view replays of golf shots from several different camera angles, and can also choose to save replays. When the player reaches the green, a grid appears on the ground to aid in putting. Different camera views can be used on the green.

The game includes a multiplayer option for up to four players. In the MS-DOS version, golf instructor David Leadbetter provides advice to the player throughout the game.

== Development and release ==
MicroProse Golf was developed by The Thought Train and was published by MicroProse. The development team consisted of Lee Hodgson and Mark Davies, both keen golfers and the programmers of the game. Hodgson worked on the game's presentation and artificial intelligence, and Davies worked on the 3D graphics. Development commenced in May 1990, under the working title 3D Golf. It was the first game developed by The Thought Train. Project manager Tim Roberts said about Hodgson and Davies, "They're fairly fresh out of college – they've done little bits here and there, but nothing substantial." Roberts said that the development team's goal was to strike a balance between simulation and gameplay. The team created their own designer program to create the courses. The course designer was described as "an unwieldy creature," although Roberts said there was a possibility of refining it and releasing it to the public, allowing players to create their own custom courses. Such an idea was contingent on the initial game's success.

The game renders all the courses in 3D using vector calculations, except for the golfer. The camera tracks the ball from its flight in mid-air to its landing. It was believed that the player would generally be focused on the ball rather than the background, so the development team chose to reduce graphical details in the background during these scenes in order to maintain the frame rate. The full graphical details are restored once the ball has landed. A similar technique had already been used in MicroProse's 3D flight simulation games.

MicroProse Golf was released in the United Kingdom in October or November 1991, for Amiga and Atari ST. It is claimed that the game was the first golf game to use the circular bar swing method, which would become common in later golf games. This quote seems to be referring to the circular/arced power meter centered on the player, as circular/arced power bars had been previously used in 1990's Links: The Challenge of Golf (DOS), in 1989 for golf games Next Open (TG-16), New 3D Golf Simulation: Harukanaru Augusta (PC-98), The Golf (MSX), and in 1986's Albatross (MSX).

The MS-DOS version is an enhanced port of the earlier versions that includes 256 colors and more-realistic landscapes. Other changes included the digitization of trees, sprites, and sound effects. Improvements were also made to the swing meter and putting. In mid-June 1992, at the U.S. Open, MicroProse announced a partnership with David Leadbetter for the upcoming version. On June 29, 1992, MicroProse announced it would be delayed to allow for Leadbetter to be implemented into the game. It was released later in 1992. In the United States, it was published under the title David Leadbetter's Greens: The Instructional 3-D Golf Simulation. In the United Kingdom, it was released as David Leadbetter's Golf.

== Reception ==
Reception

Review scores
Publication	Score
ACE	800/1000 (Atari ST)
Computer and Video Games	89% (Amiga)
Amiga Action	89% (Amiga)
Amiga Computing	91% (Amiga)
Amiga Format	90% (Amiga)
Amiga Joker	72% (Amiga)
Amiga Power	84% (Amiga)
CU Amiga	94% (Amiga)
Games-X	4.5/5 (Amiga/Atari ST)
Los Angeles Times	2/5 (DOS)
The One	91% (Amiga)
ST Action	90% (Atari ST)
ST Format	95% (Atari ST)
Zero	90/100 (Amiga/Atari ST)

Some critics considered it to be the best golf game available, or among the best. Games-X wrote that it surpassed World Class Leaderboard "in every way." The magazine also stated that the Atari ST version had slightly smoother vector graphics compared to the Amiga version. Paul Presley of The One called it "one of the most technically complete golfing sims available."

The graphics received some praise, although Gary Whitta of ACE considered them "functional rather than decorative" and wrote, "Unpolished graphics and annoyingly jerky 3D don't do the eyes many favors, and neither does the tendency to fade out the background detail whenever the ball is in motion." Stuart Campbell of Amiga Power also criticized the fact that once the golf ball is hit, "all but the close foreground is suddenly blanked out by a cloak of light blue," calling it a "rather unsettling" effect.

Paul Rigby of Amiga Computing considered it the best-looking golf game on the Amiga. John Minson of The Guardian stated that the scenery "gives a realistic sense of rolling landscapes," and concluded that it was "undoubtedly a contender" among computer golf games. Stephen Poole of Game Players stated that players accustomed to the Links series "may initially turn up their nose at the graphically plain" visuals in David Leadbetter's Greens before accepting it. Poole wrote that rather than focusing on its graphics, the game "instead offers features you won't find in any other golf simulation," with the result being a "highly playable" and enjoyable golf simulation "sure to develop its own following." The variety of game options was praised.

MicroProse Golf received mixed comparisons to PGA Tour Golf. Whitta considered the two games to be evenly as good, while other critics considered PGA Tour Golf superior. Frank O'Connor of Computer and Video Games wrote that MicroProse Golf "isn't quite as slick or smooth as PGA, but it's got tons of options that PGA never had." Presley wrote that MicroProse Golf was superior to PGA Tour Golf in some aspects such as variety, but lacking in others. Rigby preferred MicroProse Golf, calling it "expertly designed". Amiga Action called the game "technically impressive," but preferred PGA Tour Golf for its simplicity. Campbell felt that PGA Tour Golf had superior presentation and gameplay.

Some critics were disappointed with the sound effects. Dave Pyron of Computer Gaming World praised the game but had several minor criticisms, including the "skimpy and inadequate sound", which he considered to be "the most serious blemish". Trenton Webb of Amiga Format also considered the sound to be the weakest aspect of the game. Ed Ricketts of ST Format praised the sound.

David Crook and Jeane Decoster of the Los Angeles Times considered David Leadbetter's Greens to be a knock-off of the Links series, writing that the game "proves the cliche: Imitation is the sincerest form of capitalism." They stated that the game would likely appeal to people unfamiliar with the Links series. PC Zone considered David Leadbetter's Golf to be a better choice for casual gamers than Links 386 Pro. Game Players stated that David Leadbetter's Greens "lags behind" Links 386 Pro and the Jack Nicklaus series, and that it has unrealistic graphics by comparison, but that it "overcomes this by providing something unique – the first 3-D view in a golf game." The magazine concluded that it was a must-buy game for computer golfers.

Duncan MacDonald of Zero called the game a must-buy, but mentioned that it had unrealistic environments: "The terrain undulates like a giant irregular sine curve from Hell at times, with valleys here, hills there and rivers, lakes, bunkers, trees, bushes and cart-paths in between." O'Connor criticized the abundance of water on the courses, calling it one of the game's annoying aspects and writing, "It seems like every couple of yards there's a lake or a river." Webb praised the game's balance of playability and accuracy. Ricketts was disappointed by the limited number of courses. Some critics considered the game's retail price too high.

In 1993, MicroProse Golf was ranked number 21 on ST Format's list of 50 best Atari ST games. Later that year, Amiga Computing reviewed the game again and called it addictive, while praising its realism and 3D graphics. The magazine wrote that it would appeal to both golfers and non-golf fans, and stated that it was probably the easiest and most user-friendly golf game available. In 1994, Scott A. May of Compute! called David Leadbetter's Greens "without a doubt the finest instructional golf simulation on the market."
