= Links LS 2000 =

1999 video game

- Cover art, featuring Arnold Palmer
- Developer: Access Software
- Publishers: Microsoft (Windows version); MacSoft (Macintosh version)
- Artist: Brian Johnson
- Composers: Dave Shelton (Shelton Productions); Matt Heider and Jeff Abbott (Third Ear Music)
- Series: Links
- Platforms: Microsoft Windows; Macintosh
- Release: Windows: NA: October 9, 1999 (retail); NA: October 28, 1999 (nationwide); Macintosh: NA: November 14, 2000
- Genre: Sports
- Modes: Single-player; Multiplayer

Links LS 2000 is a golf video game developed by Access Software and published by Microsoft. It is part of the Links series and was released in 1999 for Microsoft Windows, and in 2000 for Macintosh. It was followed by Links 2001.

Links LS 2000 was viewed by critics as a minimally upgraded version of its predecessor, Links LS 1999. It was praised for its multiplayer, variety, and game physics, but critics felt that rival golf games such as Jack Nicklaus 6: Golden Bear Challenge were superior, in part because of their inclusion of a golf course designer. Links LS 2000 was the sixth best-selling computer sports game of 1999, with 104,225 units sold.

An add-on program with additional courses, titled Links LS 2000 10-Course Pack, was released in 2000. Links LS Classic, released later in 2000, is a version of Links LS 2000 that includes 21 championship courses.

== Gameplay ==
Links LS 2000 features six golf courses: St. Andrews Old Course, St. Andrews New Course, and St. Andrews Jubilee; Hawaii's Mauna Kea and Hapuna; and Indiana's Covered Bridge. The game also allows for various courses to be imported from previously released Links add-on disks. St. Andrews Old and Mauna Kea were featured in earlier entries in the Links series. The game includes short movies that discuss each course.

Compared to its predecessor Links LS 1999, the game adds four new golfers, including Arnold Palmer and Fuzzy Zoeller. It features five new game modes, including Fuzzy Zoeller's Wolf Challenge, which is a skins game variant. The game featured new online multiplayer options over its predecessor, including MSN Gaming Zone, and was compatible with the online LS Tour 2000. The game also introduces a feature called "SkyScape" that allows the player to change the amount of cloud coverage, and includes other adjustable options relating to wind, fog, haze, and camera angles. The player can also create and edit sounds. Links LS 2000 features commentary from David Feherty and Craig Bolerjack. The game includes three different ways to hit a ball, including Easy Swing and the complex PowerStroke; with the latter version, the player uses computer mouse motion to perform a shot.

In addition to LS Tour 2000, several other golfing events were held for online users of the game, including tournaments by the Virtual Golfing Association. Other online events included e-World Shotgun 2000 and the World Links Championship.

== Development and release ==
Links LS 2000 was developed by Access Software. Because of a limited development period, few new features were added to the game in relation to its predecessor. Links LS 2000 was completed in September 1999, and was released in North America the following month. The game was released as a set of three CDs, and was published by Microsoft, which purchased Access Software earlier in 1999.

Links LS 2000 10-Course Pack is an add-on program for Links LS 2000 and its predecessor. It features additional courses for tournaments. It was completed in January 2000, and was released the following month. Links LS Classic, released in November 2000, is a version of Links LS 2000 that includes 21 championship courses.

In November 2000, a Macintosh version of the game was released. It was ported to Macintosh by Green Dragon Creations, and was published by MacSoft, also in a set of three CDs.

== Contests ==
In November 1999, Microsoft launched the "Links LS 2000 Hole-in-One Sweepstakes," in which players would try to make a hole-in-one on the seventh hole of the game's Mauna Kea course. The winner would receive a two-person trip to Hawaii, a five-night stay at the Mauna Kea Beach Hotel, $500 of spending money, and a round of golf on the real Mauna Kea course. In June 2000, Microsoft announced its "Father's Day on the Fairway Sweepstakes", in which two grand-prize winners would compete against each other in real golf and a game of Links LS 2000. The winner would get to play a round of golf with Arnold Palmer, while 100 first-prize winners would receive a free copy of Links LS 2000.

== Reception ==
Reception

Aggregate score
Aggregator	Score
GameRankings	79%

Review scores
Publication	Score
AllGame	4.5/5
CNET Gamecenter	8/10
Computer Games Strategy Plus	3.5/5
Computer Gaming World	3.5/5
GamePro	4.5/5 (Note: GamePro gave the game two 4.5/5 scores for graphics and overall fun factor, 4/5 for sound, and 5/5 for control.)
GameSpot	7.9/10
GameSpy	76%
GameZone	5.8/10
IGN	8.2/10
MacLife	(Mac) "Spiffy"
Macworld	(Mac) 4/5
PC Accelerator	8/10
PC Gamer (US)	79%
PC Zone	77%
Hartford Courant	8/10
Inside Mac Games	(Mac) 8.25/10
St. Louis Post-Dispatch	4/4
Sports Gaming Network	90/100

Awards
Publication	Award
Software and Information Industry Association	Codie Awards (Sports Games - Best Product; 2000)
Houston Chronicle	Dr. Mac Game Hall of Fame Awards (Best Sports Game For Big Kids; 2001)

The game received favorable reviews according to the review aggregation website GameRankings.

Critics viewed it as a minimally upgraded version of its predecessor, and were hopeful that Links 2001 would be more of a substantial update in the series. Tony Wyss of GameSpy described the game as Links LS 1999 but with more multiplayer options, as well as "minimal feature improvements that keep it from being great." Wyss considered it "an extremely difficult game to assess as a reviewer," recommending it for first-time players of a golf video game while stating that owners of Links LS 1999 might want to reconsider before purchasing it. Sports Gaming Network also considered it a difficult game to review because of its similarities to the previous game, and likewise recommended it for beginning computer golfers. William Abner of Computer Games Strategy Plus considered it a "terribly difficult game to rate," praising its gameplay, its features, and calling it "one of the finer" golf simulations available, while noting its similarities to the previous game. Paul Rosano of Hartford Courant wrote that because of its $50 price, the game was difficult to recommend to owners of its predecessor, but stated that for players who "haven't updated since "Links 98" or earlier, there is definitely enough to warrant a purchase."

Tom Ham of PC Accelerator wrote that the game "feels more like an upgrade than a full-fledged product – still not a bad thing." Stephen Poole of GameSpot wrote that the game's additional features "are so unimpressive both in quantity and quality that there's simply not much reason for owners of the previous version to get excited," further stating that the game felt more like an add-on course bundle. Jeff Lackey of Computer Gaming World wrote that the game "appears to be a meager repackaging of its predecessor" with "just the barest minimum of additions necessary to justify the new package and name."

Critics believed that competitors such as Jack Nicklaus 6: Golden Bear Challenge and PGA Championship Golf 1999 Edition were superior to the game, with Poole writing that "the days of simply assuming the latest iteration of Links is the best golf sim around are long gone - especially if the series doesn't begin to evolve more quickly than it has in the past couple of installments." Lackey cited the game's lack of a course designer as one of its disadvantages against competitors, and noted that additional courses could not be downloaded for free, as with rival games. Martin Korda of PC Zone considered the lack of a course designer to be significant, calling its absence almost unforgivable. Sports Gaming Network considered the absence of a course designer to be the game's "biggest, most glaring omission," stating that such a feature "has become virtually mandatory in the golf sim world these days" and that it would have significantly improved the game's replay value, while writing, "Its absence is sorely felt, particularly as this version of the game offers so little else that is new."

The graphics received a mixed reception, with criticism going towards the game's golfer animations, and the lack of moving water. Some praised the graphics, including Michael L. House of AllGame, who also praised the SkyScape feature. Ham wrote that the game "is gorgeous and the overall look of the courses is great," but he stated that the digitized golf players resembled cardboard cutouts and that the trees and scenery "look like cheap bitmap leftovers from the Sega Genesis days." Erik Peterson of IGN was critical of the trees and bushes for resembling cardboard cutouts, while stating that they "are so pixelated at times that they are nearly indistinguishable". Peterson also wrote that the golf crowd resembled a series of "blocky wax reproductions". Michael Phillips of Inside Mac Games called the graphics "quite nice, but not perfect," criticizing the pixelated golfers and writing that "it's a tad disappointing to watch clouds that are still and water that doesn't move." Poole stated that the game's digitized graphics looked dated in comparison to rival golf games, writing "it simply looks like a photo and doesn't feel like a golf course." Wyss considered the courses beautiful, but felt the graphics could be better. Wyss stated that the 3D golfer characters looked awkward against the backdrop of the golf courses. Sports Gaming Network called it a "great looking game" but considered its graphics to be dated, while mentioning minor graphical improvements over the previous game. Michael Lafferty of GameZone considered the graphics average, and stated that the game would not appeal to golfers.

The sound received some praise, although Lafferty considered it to be average. Philip Michaels of Macworld noted minor glitches in which the sound would cut out at the end of golfing holes. The multiplayer options were praised, as were the variety and the game physics. Abner believed that Links LS 2000 had more realistic putting physics than its predecessor, while Peterson stated that the physics were "probably the best yet seen on a golf-sim."

Some criticized the Easy Swing and PowerStroke options respectively for being too simple and too difficult, although Korda considered it to be the most fun of the three swing options, while Sports Gaming Network called it "the best non-real-time mouse swing in the business." Lackey considered the lack of a real-time aspect to be a "major drawback" for the PowerStroke swing. Ham felt that the game's commentary could have been better, while Poole described it as having "huge gaps of silence followed by failed attempts at humor or insipid post-shot observations". Wyss praised the commentary for its humor. Nash Werner of GamePro stated that the game "does everything right," while St. Louis Post-Dispatch called it "the most realistic golf experience possible for the PC" and praised its "sharp and crisp" imagery.

Links LS 2000 was the sixth best-selling computer sports game of 1999, with 104,225 units sold, bringing in revenue of $4.6 million. In March 2000, the game won a Codie Award from the Software and Information Industry Association for "Sports Games - Best Product." The Houston Chronicle's Bob LeVitus, also known as "Dr. Mac," included the Macintosh version in his "Dr. Mac Game Hall of Fame Awards" in 2001; it won "Best Sports Game For Big Kids".

== See also ==
- Microsoft Golf 2001 Edition
