= Do over =

Do over may refer to:

- Mulligan (games), in games and sports
- Do Over, a 2002 American fantasy sitcom television series
- "Do-Over", a third-season episode of the American television series 30 Rock
- Do Over (Transformers), a Transformers comic book set in the Shattered Glass continuity
- The Do-Over, a 2016 action comedy film

== See also ==
- Do Overs and Second Chances, 2010 rock album by Go Radio
- Redo
- Dover (disambiguation)
