= Links: The Challenge of Golf =

1990 video game

- Developers: Access Software; Papyrus (Sega CD)
- Publishers: NA: Access Software; EU: U.S. Gold; NA: Virgin (Sega CD)
- Director: Vance Cook
- Programmers: Roger Carver; Vance Cook; Kevin Homer
- Artists: John Berven; Bruce Carver
- Composer: Brent Erickson
- Series: Links
- Platforms: MS-DOS, Amiga, Sega CD, Tandy Video Information System
- Release: MS-DOS: NA/EU: 1990; Tandy Video Information System: NA: 1992; Amiga: NA/EU: 1992; Sega CD: NA: September 1994
- Genre: Sports
- Modes: Single-player, multiplayer

Links: The Challenge of Golf is a golf video game developed by Access Software. It was published for MS-DOS in 1990, followed by the Amiga in 1992, Tandy Video Information System in 1992. A Sega CD version, developed by Papyrus Design Group, was released in 1994. It is the first game in the Links series, and was followed by Links 386 Pro (1992). A Microsoft Windows version, titled Microsoft Golf, was released in 1992 as the first game in the Microsoft Golf series.

Links: The Challenge of Golf features the real-life Torrey Pines South Course, which was recreated in the game through the use of photos and video. The game was praised for its realism and won several awards, and some critics noted the high computer requirements. The game was criticized for the sluggish reanimation of each new screen.

== Gameplay ==
On the first tee (MS-DOS)

Links: The Challenge of Golf features one golf course: Torrey Pines South Course. Additional courses can be added to the IBM PC compatible version through the use of add-on disks. The player can pull up an overhead map of the course, and can place a contoured grid on the course to aid in golfing. The player can also choose to take a mulligan to make up for a bad shot. The game includes commentary in reaction to the player's golfing. Also featured is a replay option allowing the player to watch the shots they made. The player can choose to watch the replay from the golfer's location or from the area where the ball landed. The game also includes a multiplayer option.

== Development and release ==
Links: The Challenge of Golf was developed by American company Access Software for DOS. The development team included Roger and Bruce Carver, who previously programmed Access Software's earlier golf game, Leader Board.

To recreate the Torrey Pines South Course, the game's programmers played the course, videotaped it, and took 500 aerial and ground-based photographs of it. They also obtained topographical and grading drawings of the course, and researched the local weather. The recreation of Torrey Pines takes up 700,000 bytes of data, and includes the course's clubhouse. In addition to digitized vegetation, the player's golfing character is also digitized. The golfer's movements are depicted through 72 frames of video. Because of computer memory limits, several concepts were removed from the game just before its release: a demonstration mode, a high score card, and female golfers. The DOS version includes 256 colors.

In the United States, Access Software published the game for DOS in 1990, while U.S. Gold published the UK version during the same year. Access converted the game into an Amiga version and published it in 1992, . This version was also published by U.S. Gold in the United Kingdom in 1992 and had the particularity to be one of the few hard-drive only game on the Amiga. It also use the HAM mode which allows up to 4096 colors at once at screen which was unusual on the machine and resulted as the game being particularly slow on an unexpanded Amiga. A version for the Sega CD was developed by Papyrus Design Group. It was published by Virgin Interactive Entertainment and released in the U.S. in September 1994.

In April 1992, Microsoft and Access Software announced a partnership to create Microsoft Golf, a revamped version of Links: The Challenge of Golf. Charles Fitzgerald, Microsoft's product manager for applications marketing, said that Links was chosen as the basis for Microsoft Golf because Access Software "spent 18 months getting the physics right." Microsoft Golf was released for Microsoft Windows in North America later in 1992. It includes the Torrey Pines South Course, and also uses the golfer animation from Links 386 Pro (1992). It is the first game in the Microsoft Golf series.

== Reception ==
Reception

Review scores
Publication	Score
Computer and Video Games	80% (DOS)
Amiga Action	81% (Amiga)
Amiga Format	92% (Amiga)
Amiga Joker	68% (Amiga)
Amiga Power	70% (Amiga)
The One	89% (DOS)
Raze	93% (DOS)
Rock, Paper, Shotgun	8/10 (2019)
Zero	93/100 (DOS)

Awards
Publication	Award
Computer Gaming World	Action Game of the Year (1991)
Power Play	Bestes Sportspiel ("Best Sports Game"; 1991)
Software Publishers Association	Best Sports Program (1991)

Links: The Challenge of Golf was praised for the realism of its graphics, sound, and gameplay. Richard O. Mann of Compute! wrote that Access Software "has taken computer golf a giant step forward with Links," calling it a "visual extravaganza that's the most fun and most realistic golf program I've tried." Mann praised the controls and concluded that Links "is a golfer's dream, a chance to play what feels like real golf without ever having to leave home." Amiga Action considered it among the top golfing games available, and wrote that it would appeal primarily to professional golfers.

Les Ellis of Raze offered praise for the replay feature, and wrote that Links "contains everything you could need in a golf simulation," while concluding that it "has got to be the best golf game on any home computer." Don Trivette of PC Magazine considered it the most authentic golf simulation available. Gordon Houghton of The One praised the game's variety and called Links "one hell of a golf simulation."

H.E. Dille of Computer Gaming World stated that Links "revolutionizes graphic standards," and considered the game to be among "the first of a new generation." In addition, Dille praised the inclusion of the mulligan option. However, Dille considered the wildlife sounds and background music to be "'tinny' and annoying," and stated that certain graphics were not as good as the rest of the game, writing that up-close water hazards "appear as flat blue blobs that simply seem out of context with their surroundings."

Neil Jackson of Amiga Format praised the controls, and considered the game to be as good as Leader Board, PGA Tour Golf, and MicroProse Golf. Matthew Squires of Amiga Power believed that it was easier that MicroProse Golf and PGA Tour Golf, and that it had better controls. Computer and Video Games believed that PGA Tour Golf was a superior game, despite being "not as pretty."

Some reviewers noted the high computer requirements needed to fully enjoy the game's graphics, and some were critical of the sluggish reanimation for each new screen. Houghton stated that the one factor keeping Links from being "the ultimate golf simulation" was the reanimation times, stating that they hampered the fun of the game. Squires called it "the most frustrating golf game on the Amiga" because of the wait times, writing that "if you want the detail that makes the game so stunningly real, you'll have to wait over two minutes". Squires stated that this "very seriously spoils what could otherwise be a perfect golf game". Amiga Action mentioned the slow reanimation but wrote that it was "not deserving of severe criticism."

Links won Computer Gaming World's 1991 Action Game of the Year award, the 1991 Software Publishers Association award for Best Sports Program, and Power Play's 1991 Bestes Sportspiel ("Best Sports Game") award. It was also a finalist for PC Magazine's 1991 Technical Excellence awards. In 1996, Next Generation included Links on its list of the Top 100 Games of All Time, while Computer Gaming World included the game on its list of the 15 Most Innovative Computer Games.
