= Doyer =

Doyer is a surname. Notable people with the surname include:

- Theo Doyer (1955–2010), Dutch hockey player
- Danielle Doyer (born 1951), French-Canadian politician and teacher
- Jacobus Schoemaker Doyer (1792–1867), Dutch painter

== See also ==
- Boyer
- Dover (surname)
