= Links Extreme =

1999 video game

- Developer: Access Software
- Publishers: Microsoft; Sega Ozisoft (Australia)
- Producer: Kevin Homer
- Programmer: Matt Dawson
- Artist: Doug Vandegrift
- Series: Links
- Platform: Microsoft Windows
- Release: NA: May 27, 1999; AU: July 1999
- Genre: Sports
- Modes: Single-player; Multiplayer

Links Extreme is a 1999 golf video game developed by Access Software and published by Microsoft for Microsoft Windows. It is the first game in the Links series to be published by Microsoft, which purchased Access Software a month prior to the game's release.

Links Extreme features unusual game modes and courses that are not common to the sport of golf. Critics felt that the game's concept was not handled well, and its small selection of two courses was particularly criticized.

== Gameplay ==
Links Extreme features game modes and courses that are unusual to the sport of golf. Among the four unique game modes is Armadillo Al's Demolition Driving Range, in which the player uses exploding golf balls to hit targets such as armadillos, cows, and hot air balloons. The Extreme Golf mode features 17 pranks which affect a player's golf ball in different ways that can be harmful or beneficial to the player. In the Deathmatch and Poison game modes, the player is given a variety of exploding golf balls that are used to injure and ultimately kill the opponent golfer. The Poison mode differs in that the player can choose between playing the course or attacking the opponent golfer. The game also includes stroke play.

The game includes two courses. Mojo Bay is an 18-hole course with a haunted island theme featuring zombies, giant skeletons, swamp monsters, crocodiles, and a pirate ship. Dimension X is a nine-hole course with the theme of a World War I battlefield, including biplanes, damaged buildings, and explosions. Golfers are dressed in Generation X clothing, including baggy jeans and cargo pants. The game features several golf swing methods, including traditional two-click and three-click options. Also featured is a multiplayer mode with options such as modem and LAN play, as well as compatibility with MSN Gaming Zone.

== Development and release ==
Links Extreme was developed by Access Software, using the same game engine as other Links games at the time. The game was announced in mid-1998, and its release was initially scheduled for October 11 of that year. Chris Jones, executive vice president for Access Software, described the game as "Indiana Jones meets Happy Gilmore on the golf course. It's designed for the golfer who wants to bend the rules, demolish some clubs, but most importantly, win at all costs." Access Software acknowledged that the game was a risky idea, but believed that it would introduce golf to a broader audience, specifically younger gamers. The company stated that the game was not intended for the hardcore fans of the regular Links games.

Microsoft purchased Access Software in April 1999, but had little involvement in the game, which was largely finished by that time. Links Extreme was the first Links game to be published by Microsoft. In the United States, the game was released for Microsoft Windows on May 27, 1999. In Australia, the game was published by Sega Ozisoft in mid-July 1999.

== Reception ==
Reception

Aggregate score
Aggregator	Score
GameRankings	51%

Review scores
Publication	Score
AllGame	2/5
CNET Gamecenter	4/10
Computer Games Strategy Plus	3/5
EP Daily	2.5/10
GamePro	2/5 (Note: GamePro gave the game two 3.5/5 scores for graphics and sound, 4/5 for control, and 2/5 for overall fun factor.)
GameSpot	5.6/10
GameZone	6.9/10
IGN	5.3/10
PC Accelerator	3/10
PC Gamer (US)	37%

The game received mixed reviews according to the review aggregation website GameRankings.

Critics felt that the game did not push its concept far enough, and that the concept was not handled well. Marc Saltzman of GamePro called it "a great idea gone horribly wrong," and believed that Access Software could have done better at making a creative and fun game out of the concept. Shawn Nicholls of AllGame called the game "a mix of a good idea with poor execution," but believed that it achieved its "off-the-wall" aspect. Gordon Goble of CNET Gamecenter considered it an "intriguing alternative golfing concept that didn't translate well," and called it a "dumbed-down" version of Links. Dan Egger of PC Gamer also considered it a good idea, but called the final product a "hall-assed attempt to make golf seem like an Aerosmith video". Egger felt that the game went only "halfway toward extremeness," and that "few, if any, boundaries are ever pushed" in the game. He considered it a "hideously unsuccessful" spin-off of the main Links games. PC Accelerator called the game a "Moronic detraction" from the Links series. Jon Dickinson of GameZone wrote that there "could have been a lot more time and effort" put into the game.

Some critics stated that the game quickly became boring due to its lack of variety. The limited course selection was particularly criticized. William Abner of Computer Games Strategy Plus praised the Mojo Bay course for being adequately difficult, while Edgar Dupree of IGN considered it superior to Dimension X, which Dupree called "a joke of a course" in comparison. Goble also praised Mojo Bay, and felt that the various background features on Dimension X were "so superimposed and pixelated, it's laughable." He also felt that its World War I theme was out of place, describing it as "more weird than 'extreme.'" Nicholls enjoyed Dimension X over Mojo Bay, writing that it "is so well done, it's a shame it isn't the 18-hole course instead." Sean Miller of The Electric Playground praised both courses and considered them interesting. Steven L. Kent stated that "the monsters and strange course designs detract from the action."

The driving range mode was especially criticized, in part because of its graphics and sound. Egger called the driving range a "slapped-together" feature that would only hold minimal interest, and Stephen Poole of GameSpot also felt that it had limited appeal. Abner considered the driving range shallow and forgettable, while Goble called it "annoyingly awful", and stated that it quickly became "absurdly boring". Kent called the driving range "a fun diversion". Abner considered Extreme Golf to be the best game mode, praising its humor. Miller also praised Extreme Golf, although Nicolls stated that it "doesn't hold much interest". Egger called the Deathmatch mode "utterly forgettable," and Dickinson considered Poison to be the most entertaining game mode.

The sound and music received some praise, including the Mojo Bay course music. Abner and Nicholls praised the game's graphics, although Dickinson was disappointed by them. Nicholls believed the golf swings and putting were too difficult.

Some critics wondered who the game's target audience was; Dupree wrote that golf fans would dislike the "wacky game mechanics" while action gamers would find the game boring. Poole stated that the game "tries much too hard" to appeal to both golfers and action gamers, resulting in a poor product. Some critics noted a complete lack of online players to compete against on MSN Gaming Zone. Saltzman noted various game glitches, including long load times and crashes. Miller also noted long loading times, and Goble complained of sluggish artificial intelligence as well as crashing. Goble considered the game "disjointed and hurried"; in describing Armadillo Al's Demolition Driving Range, he wrote "when Al himself says his facility is located in west Texas and the manual says it's in Nevada, you know someone didn't have enough time to straighten things out before the game's release." Dickinson also believed that the game felt "sort of unfinished."

Aaron Curtiss of Los Angeles Times described the game as "tasteless and boorish," and called it "my kind of golf game," stating that it would appeal to men who enjoy explosions. Doug Bedell of The Dallas Morning News considered it more entertaining than real golf or the traditional Links LS games.
