= Links 2003 =

2002 video game

- Developer: Microsoft
- Publisher: Microsoft Game Studios
- Designer: Mark McArthur
- Artist: Eric Parkinson
- Series: Links
- Platform: Windows
- Release: US: September 19, 2002; AU: September 24, 2002; UK: October 11, 2002
- Genre: Sports
- Modes: Single-player, multiplayer

Links 2003 is a golf video game developed by Microsoft and published by Microsoft Game Studios. It is part of the Links series and was released for Windows in 2002. It follows Links 2001 and was followed by Links 2004. The game includes six courses, a course designer, and four professional golfers: David Toms, Jesper Parnevik, Sergio García, and Annika Sörenstam. Links 2003 introduces a golf swing method that works in real time as the player makes the shot.

Links 2003 received "generally favorable reviews" according to Metacritic. Critics praised the graphics, the game physics, the multitude of game options, and the introduction of a real-time swing. However, the game's environments were considered to be stagnant and lifeless.

== Gameplay ==
Putting

Links 2003 features six golf courses: Gleneagles, Ocean Club at Cabo del Sol, Lodge at Kauri Cliffs (New Zealand), Cambrian Ridge, The Tribute at Otsego Club, and the fictional oceanside location of Skeleton Coast set in Africa. Courses from previous Links games can be converted for play in Links 2003. Nine golfers are featured, including five generic characters. The game includes four professional golfers: David Toms, Jesper Parnevik, Sergio García, and Annika Sörenstam. The player has various options for customizing the golfer.

Links 2003 also includes the Arnold Palmer Course Designer 1.5, allowing the player to create custom golf courses. The player can also add WAV sound files into the game. Game modes include best ball, match, Nassau, scramble, skins, and stroke. Also included is a career mode, in which the player works their way up from qualifying school to world champion. The Mode of Play Designer gives the player numerous options for customizing the various game modes.

Several golf swing methods are featured, including traditional two-click and three-click options, and the PowerStroke option. The game introduces the Real-Time Swing (RTS), in which the player uses the motion of the computer mouse to simulate the swing, which is performed in real time as the player makes the shot. A colored grid and the Green Analyzer both aid the player when putting on the green. Links 2003 includes lessons for beginner players, and advice is offered throughout the game.

Various multiplayer options were offered at the time of the game's release, including Microsoft Gaming Zone, and tournaments arranged between players through e-mail. In addition, the online Links Tour allowed the player to compete against up to 63 other golfers in tournaments. A matchmaking service was also provided for players.

== Development and release ==
Links 2003 was announced by Microsoft on February 27, 2002, at the International Games Festival in Las Vegas. The game was developed by Microsoft. The Arnold Palmer Course Designer 1.5 is the same tool used by the development team to create the game's six courses. In addition, the greens were recreated through 500 GPS points that were taken on the actual golf courses. The game features improved game physics over its predecessor. In an effort to achieve realism in the game, lead designer Mark McArthur said, "We had [programmers] with hard hats out in the driving range, and they would watch the balls fly toward them."

It is the first game in the Links series to feature 3D polygonal golfers, rather than the digitized FMV golfers featured in previous games. The golfers are made of approximately 7,500 polygons. García and Parnevik participated in motion capture sessions to create their onscreen golfers. Each of the professional golfers also provided their voices for the game.

Links 2003 was completed in early September 2002, and was released in the United States later that month. It was published by Microsoft Game Studios. Links 2003 was accompanied by a separate game titled Links 2003 Championship Courses, which features the same courses and also includes 20 courses from previous Links games.

In the United Kingdom, Links 2003 and Links 2003 Championship Courses were released on October 11, 2002. A bundle set, consisting of Links 2003 and Links 2003 Championship Courses, was released in 2003 under the title Links 2003 Championship Edition.

== Reception ==
Reception

Aggregate score
Aggregator	Score
Metacritic	82/100

Review scores
Publication	Score
Computer Gaming World	4/5
Eurogamer	7/10
GameSpot	8/1/10
GameSpy	91/100
GameZone	7.8/10
IGN	8.6/10
PC Gamer (US)	89%
PC Zone	8.2/10
Extended Play	3/5
Sports Gaming Network	85/100

Links 2003 received "generally favorable reviews" according to Metacritic. Some critics considered it the best golf game available. The graphics were praised, especially the golfers. The physics were also praised, with Andy Mahood of GameSpy calling them the best of any golf game available. Tom Bramwell of Eurogamer called it "unquestionably the most realistic golf simulation ever offered on any platform" and wrote that the game engine "allows for almost every variable - we couldn't think of anything it doesn't do." Praise was given for the multitude of game options, including the various multiplayer features, although some critics were disappointed by the limited number of professional golfers.

Critics considered the game's environments to be stagnant and lifeless, particularly due to the stillness of water, clouds, and the golf crowd. Ivan Sulic of IGN criticized the lack of flying birds, and wrote, "It's like playing in an episode of the Twilight Zone where nothing is alive". Gord Goble of GameSpot also criticized the lack of birds, and wrote, "Opposing players don't move a muscle when they're in view. Neither do the spectators, even when you can hear them applauding. Trees don't bend, tall grass doesn't sway, and clouds remain perfectly still." Michael Lafferty of GameZone wrote, "The wind may be blowing, but tree branches are not moving. And there isn't a ripple on those beautiful, reflective water surfaces, nor do the clouds move. The gallery is a bunch of frozen folks that applaud without moving a muscle." Chris Johnson of Sports Gaming Network criticized the lack of an atmospheric golfing environment, and wrote, "This creates the rather odd predicament that Links 2003 does some things much better than other golf simulations but fails miserably at others - so much so that it detracts greatly from the overall gameplay value." Bramwell wrote that the overall game "feels lifeless to play, even though it's one of the most calculating and downright realistic simulations of any sport to date - a real shame." Mahood considered the only issue with the graphics to be the "decidedly static water renderings". AM Urbanek of Extended Play called the game environments "excruciatingly static".

The addition of a real-time swing was praised. Mahood called it a "much overdue" feature, and Dan Morris of PC Gamer wrote, "With a mouse-swing as natural and lifelike as the one in Links 2003, the series is reawakened." Jeff Lackey of Computer Gaming World wrote that Microsoft "has delivered a solid game with Links 2003, and with the new RTS, it has retained its title as the king of the golf sims." Critics were disappointed that the game's Dynamic camera view does not work when using the real-time swing.

Some critics were disappointed by the minimal ambient noise, and the lack of golf commentary. Urbanek considered the sound to be weakest aspect of the game, and wrote that "when playing along a coastal cliff, the absence of the roar of the surf is just strange." Mahood stated that the audio clips of golfers' post-shot reactions did not always align well. Goble stated that the applause and cheers from the crowd "are erratic--accompanying some shots, not accompanying other equally good shots, and suddenly pouncing at full blast rather than ebbing and flowing as real crowd reactions would do." Johnson also complained of erratic crowd reactions, and stated that the audio "fails miserably when it tries to re-create the atmosphere of a tournament event."

Some critics noted issues in which the game would freeze, while other critics stated that the game played fine when tested on multiple computers. Bramwell considered the lock-up glitches to be "easily the most damning thing" about the game. Goble wrote that much of the game felt sluggish, while Sulic stated that the game would play slowly on older computers. Johnson complained of slow screen redrawing, and Keith Pullin of PC Zone stated that the screen redraw could take up to 30 seconds on less-powerful computers.

Links 2003 was nominated for PC Gamer's "2002 Best Sports Game" award, but lost to Tiger Woods PGA Tour 2003. It was also nominated for the 2003 Interactive Achievement Awards for "Computer Sports Game of the Year", but eventually lost to Madden NFL 2003.
