= Links 386 Pro =

1992 video game

- Developer: Access Software
- Publisher: Access Software (Note: Released in Japan by Japanese publisher Cybelle.)
- Designers: Vance Cook; Kevin Homer; Roger Carver
- Artists: Bruce Carver; David F. Brown
- Series: Links
- Platforms: MS-DOS, Mac OS, FM Towns, PC-98
- Release: July 1992: DOS; NA: July 1992; Mac OS; NA: 1994; FM Towns; JP: February 1995; PC-98; JP: February 10, 1995
- Genre: Sports
- Modes: Single-player, multiplayer

Links 386 Pro is a golf simulation sports game for MS-DOS released in 1992. It is part of the Links series, and was developed by Access Software as the follow-up to Links: The Challenge of Golf (1990). A Macintosh version, Links Pro, was released in 1994. An enhanced version called Links 386 CD was released for PC in 1995 that included audio comments by comedian Bobcat Goldthwait acting as the player's caddie, and an aerial flyby of each hole streamed from the game's CD-ROM. Re-branded versions of the game were also released for Microsoft Windows under the titles Microsoft Golf 2.0 (1994) and Microsoft Golf 3.0 (1996), part of the Microsoft Golf series. It was followed four years later by Links LS 1997.

== Gameplay ==
The player on the tee (MS-DOS)

Players select a male or female character and their clothing. They select the level of play (beginner, amateur, and pro) and tee position. The player can control character direction and foot position, and the shot is controlled by a swing meter, held to the top for power and released and clicked again as it swings back to the bottom for direction - early will hook and late will slice. Players can select from multiple views, split the screen, and record shots. Shots can be repeated (a mulligan) and short putts taken (a gimme).

In 1994, the Computer Sports Network ran the Links Tour, an online tournament of 250 players accessible via modem.

== Technical features ==
The game runs quickly because it was written in assembly code, though courses can take several seconds to be drawn on less powerful systems. The courses are drawn piece by piece, beginning with the backdrop, then the buildings, then the plants. It was considered to use a large amount of memory for the time, running best on 8 MB. On the PC at least a Intel 80386 is required. Some features can be turned off to increase the running speed. The game features Super VGA graphics, one of the first games to do so. It features sounds such as birds, frogs, comments from the golfers, and applause. The Macintosh version runs best on a Power Mac, and voice control of the game is available.

Different versions of Links 386 Pro, Links 386 CD, and the Microsoft Golf derivatives include either one or two courses presented through digitized images, and additional courses could be purchased separately. Lower resolution courses for the earlier game, Links: The Challenge of Golf, can be converted for play in Links 386 Pro. A subsequent version, titled Links 386 CD, includes the voice of Bobcat Goldthwait as the player's caddie.

Through a deal with Access Software, Microsoft published its own Links games for Microsoft Windows under the Microsoft Golf name. Microsoft Golf 2.0 (1994; Windows 3.0) is a version of Links 386 Pro that includes Firestone South Course and Torrey Pines South Course, while Microsoft Golf 3.0 (1996; Windows 95) features the same courses as Links 386 Pro. Microsoft Golf 3.0 was included with many personal computers as a pre-loaded game. Both Microsoft Golf 2.0 and Golf 3.0 have 16-bit Windows components but also make use of Win32s.

== Courses ==
Links 386 Pro has one included course, Harbour Town, and additional courses could be purchased separately under the "Links Championship Courses" branding. Microsoft Golf 2.0 instead included Torrey Pines and Firestone. Links 386 CD and Microsoft Golf 3.0 also features Harbour Town, but added a second course that varies regionally, with North American and Australian copies including Banff Springs, while European copies include The Belfry.

Additional courses could be purchased individually on floppy disc or CD, with some releases including a flyby video for use only with Links 386 CD, Microsoft Golf 2.0, and Microsoft Golf 3.0. Most of the add-on courses would later be offered in four 5-course bundles that are compatible with later releases in the series.

In addition to buying courses, a tool is included with the game that can convert the eight courses that had been made available for the original Links: The Challenge of Golf: Torrey Pines, Firestone, Bountiful Municipal Golf Course, Bay Hill Club, Pinehurst Country Club, Dorado Beach East Course, Barton Creek-Fazio, and Troon North. The converted courses are at a lower resolution than the courses natively created for Links 386, and newer versions of these courses were later sold with better graphics.

== Development ==
Links 386 Pro was developed with a budget of $500,000, which was mostly allocated towards employee salaries, and took nearly three years to make, according to Chris Jones. The game was released in the second week of July 1992. Links Pro, for the Macintosh, appeared in 1994.

== Reception ==
Reception

Review scores
Publication	Score
Computer Gaming World	3/5 (Microsoft Golf 2.0); 4/5 (Microsoft Golf 3.0)
GameSpot	7.5/10 (Links 386 CD)
Gamecenter	7/10 (Microsoft Golf 3.0)
MacUser	4.5/5 (Links Pro)
PC Magazine	3/5 (Microsoft Golf 3.0)

Awards
Publication	Award
Compute!	Best Sports Game
Computer Gaming World	Overall Game of the Year
Software Publishers Association	Best Sports Program

Links 386 Pro was a commercial success, with sales of roughly 400,000 units by July 1994. At the time, Bruce Carver of Access Software estimated that its actual ownership number was "at least 1.6 million" thanks to software piracy.

The graphics were much praised, described as "almost photo-realistic". Some players complained that achieving a low scoring round was too easy. Computer Gaming World in 1992 stated "the final word in golf—for now, at least—is Links 386 Pro, praising the game's "stunning" Super VGA graphics and "dream come true" gameplay. The magazine predicted that "it is quite likely that the only thing to ever beat this game will be yet another version of Links."

In 1993 Links received a Codie award from the Software Publishers Association for Best Sports Program, and Computer Gaming World awarded it Overall Game of the Year, stating that doing so was "pretty obvious" given how long Links 386 Pro had been at the top of the magazine's Top 100 Games list. In 1994, it was reported that "Links 386 Pro easily leads the market for golf games". That year, PC Gamer US named Links 386 Pro the 6th best computer game ever. The editors called it "one of the most polished and professional games ever produced". In 1996, Computer Gaming World declared Links 386 the 26th-best computer game ever released.

In 2014, PC PowerPlay listed Links 386 Pro among the 100 most influential PC games, saying it was "the perfect way to demonstrate all 40MHz worth of computing power in one’s brand new PC."

The Age rated Links Pro, the Macintosh version, 4 stars out of 4, writing that "great depth and realism makes it the golf game for serious indoor swingers". Links Pro received a score of 4.5 out of 5 from MacUser. Links Pro sold 19,699 during 1997 in the United States, and was among that year's best-selling Mac games in the country.

== See also ==
- List of golf video games
