= Innisbrook Resort and Golf Club =

Hotel and country club in Florida

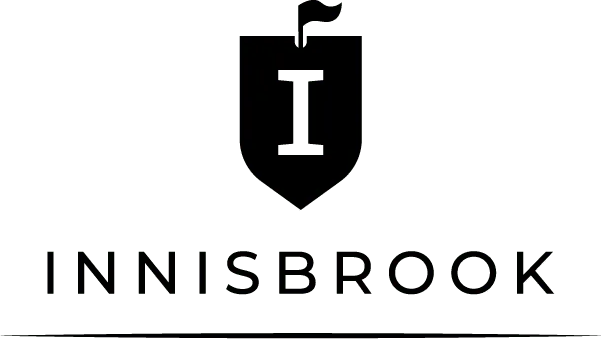

- Location within the United States Location within Florida
- 28.11°N 82.76°W

Club information
- Location: Palm Harbor, Florida, U.S.
- Elevation: 25 feet (7.5 m)
- Established: 1970, 56 years ago
- Type: Private
- Owner: Salamander Hotels & Resorts
- Total holes: 63
- Tournaments: Valspar Championship
- Website: innisbrookgolfresort.com

Island Course
- Par: 72
- Length: 7,194 yards (6,578 m)
- Course rating: 75.1
- Slope rating: 144

Copperhead Course
- Par: 71
- Length: 7,209 yards (6,592 m)
- Course rating: 75.9
- Slope rating: 142
- Course record: 61 – Pádraig Harrington (2012)

North Course
- Par: 35
- Length: 2,950 yards (2,700 m)
- Course rating: 69.9
- Slope rating: 127

South Course
- Par: 71
- Length: 6,620 yards (6,053 m)
- Course rating: 71.2
- Slope rating: 125

Innisbrook Resort and Golf Club is a hotel and country club resort in the southeastern United States, located in Palm Harbor, Florida, northwest of Tampa. The complex consists of a 300-room hotel, with 1100 permanent owner units, three 18 hole golf Courses and a 9 hole Course, spa, 3 restaurants, and 2 conference facilities.

The Innisbrook Resort has been owned and operated by Salamander Hotels & Resorts since July 2007, having previously been owned by the Golf Trust investment group since 2004 under the Westin Hotels & Resorts brand.

== Golf ==
There are four golf courses at Innisbrook, all designed by Larry Packard, the oldest of which is the Island Course, which was completed in 1970. Then came the construction of the Sandpiper Course. The Copperhead Course, venue for the PGA Tour's Valspar Championship, came next in 1974,basis of the Highlands North Course. The final addition was the Highlands South Course.

Winners of the tournament have included major champions Jordan Spieth, Charl Schwartzel, Retief Goosen, Vijay Singh, and Jim Furyk.

=== Scorecard ===
Innisbrook Resort and Golf Club - Copperhead Course
Tee	Rating/Slope	1	2	3	4	5	6	7	8	9	Out	10	11	12	13	14	15	16	17	18	In	Total
Black	75.9 / 142	560	413	442	188	607	452	410	232	420	3724	441	567	373	199	590	208	458	206	443	3485	7209
Green	73.1 / 139	528	371	407	163	570	422	373	201	392	3427	410	525	357	179	561	182	412	181	390	3197	6624
White	71.1 / 137	521	359	386	140	526	406	345	176	378	3237	374	514	343	148	532	172	376	171	376	3006	6243
Gold	69.2 / 131	456	331	362	134	458	357	335	145	343	2921	343	435	343	144	505	160	336	161	328	2755	5676
Combo	67.0 / 127	456	331	362	134	458	304	273	145	294	2757	343	435	315	102	448	130	336	118	328	2555	5312
Red	65.2 / 122	456	291	291	95	388	304	273	124	294	2516	295	372	315	102	448	130	294	118	261	2335	4851
SI	Men's	5	11	7	17	1	3	13	15	9		8	6	12	18	2	14	4	16	10
Par		5	4	4	3	5	4	4	3	4	36	4	5	4	3	5	3	4	3	4	35	71
White	77.7 / 149	521	359	386	140	526	406	345	176	378	3237	374	514	343	148	532	172	376	171	376	3006	6243
Gold	74.8 / 140	456	331	362	134	458	357	335	145	343	2921	343	435	343	144	505	160	336	161	328	2755	5676
Combo	72.1 / 136	456	331	362	134	458	304	273	145	294	2757	343	435	315	102	448	130	336	118	328	2555	5312
Red	69.8 / 131	456	291	291	95	388	304	273	124	294	2516	295	372	315	102	448	130	294	118	261	2335	4851
SI	Ladies'	9	5	1	15	3	11	13	17	7		12	10	8	18	2	14	4	16	6

== In gaming ==
The Copperhead course was featured as part of the lineup of course offerings in the Links (series) of golf games for the PC. It was again showcased in PGA Tour 2K21 as an official course; the Valspar Championship was also one of the featured events in its career mode.
