= UltraCorps =

- Developer(s): VR-1 Entertainment
- Designer(s): Stan James
- Artist(s): Brandon Gillam
- Genre(s): Turn-based strategy
- Mode(s): Multiplayer

UltraCorps is an online, multi-player, turn-based space strategy game originally developed by VR-1 Entertainment in 1997 and acquired by Microsoft's MSN Gaming Zone in 1998. The game couples distinctive 3-D rendered artwork and the ability to play with hundreds of people in a single game. It was the first multi-player turn-based game that could be played entirely in a web browser. In 2006, the game was redeveloped by Steve Jackson Games.

== Gameplay ==
Starting with a single planet, the goal of an Ultracorps game is to either conquer as many planets as possible or accumulate score in various categories (the victory condition varies). Since the duration of the game is limited, but the number of planets is effectively unlimited, players are encouraged to be highly aggressive at all times.

Players buy units, group those units into fleets, move those fleets, attack enemy planets, and purchase technology during their turn. Players may also conduct diplomacy through an in-game messaging system when required. There are no AI fleets in the game, with the sole exception of the static defensive fleets which guard neutral planets.

Ultracorps has a "tick" based turn system. Players log in and make their moves and purchases, then the moves, battles and economic changes are calculated by the server (the "Acutron") at a set time during the day (or, for player-owned PUB games, whenever they choose), at which point a new turn starts. A player can log in at any time to modify their moves, and the continuation of the game is not contingent on each and every player taking a turn.

Technology takes the form of unit "licenses" purchased on a planet, representing production and training facilities. Once a player purchases the license for a unit, they may produce that unit on the planet where the license was purchased. Certain planets will be rich with licenses for technology, while others will have only licenses to build basic defensive units. Players may buy licenses for new units, as well as licenses which allow the upgrading of units.

The cost of producing a unit is determined by a dynamic economic system. As more players begin to purchase a unit, its price climbs accordingly. When demand for the unit eventually fall, the price of the unit also begins to decrease. Part of the strategy of the game involves taking advantage of price fluctuations to produce units at a lower price.

There are 14 races in Utracorps that players can choose from. Other than graphics, the only differences between the races are their starting homeworld, unit types and licences owned. Early game, each race has a distinctive strategy dictated by what technology is available.

As December 2006, certain races now have traits that distinguish them further from their fellows. For example, the Nozama race has the unique ability to produce 'Queens' that can spawn several Nozama Fighters every turn without the use of any resources.
