= Links LS 1997 =

1996 sports video game

- Developer: Access Software
- Publisher: Access Software
- Series: Links
- Platforms: DOS, Classic Mac OS (Note: The Macintosh version does not display the game title as Links LS 1997 and instead goes by the title Links LS Macintosh.)
- Release: NA: May 28, 1996; EU: August 26, 1996
- Genre: Sports

Links LS (Legends in Sports), later given the retronym Links LS 1997, is a golf video game developed and published by Access Software for DOS. It was released in 1996, and is part of the Links video game series, following Links 386 Pro (1992). It was followed by Links LS 1998.

== Gameplay ==
Links LS has three unnamed playable golfers, with Arnold Palmer as a fourth. It has three courses, including Palmer's Latrobe Country Club, and is also compatible with previous courses released for Links 386. The player can also take a virtual tour of Palmer's office and workshop.

== Development and release ==
Like its predecessors, Links LS (Legends in Sports) was developed and published by Access Software. The game was in development for three years. Access initially considered naming the project Links Pentium. However, Intel objected to the title over trademark concerns regarding its Pentium microprocessor.

Unlike the earlier games, Access added computer players, improved ball physics, and high-resolution graphics. The company also spent $50,000 on a motion-capture machine to create the golfer animations, providing a higher level of detail than before. To accurately recreate the Latrobe course, Access conducted extensive interviews with Palmer and co-designer Ed Seay. Several features were eventually scrapped and saved for the game's successor. Modem-based gameplay was among the planned features, but was removed due to time constraints. Links LS was released in 1996.

== Reception ==
Reception

Review scores
Publication	Score
Computer Games Strategy Plus	4.5/5
Computer Gaming World	4.5/5
GameSpot	8.2/10
Macworld	4.5/5
Next Generation	4/5 (PC)
PC Games (DE)	94%
PC Player	5/5

Macworld's Michael Gowan called Links LS a "beautifully rendered golf sim [that] is almost as tough to master as the real thing." A Next Generation critic said it put the Links series "once again at the top of the PC golfing heap", citing its impressive technical specs even by the standards of high-end setups, support for all the Links 386 add-on disks, and customizable features.

Links LS was a finalist for the Computer Game Developers Conference's 1996 "Best Sports Game" Spotlight Award, but lost the prize to NHL 97. It was also the runner-up for Computer Gaming World's 1996 "Sports Game of the Year" award, which ultimately went to NBA Live 97. The editors praised Links LS as "the best-looking golf game we've seen." Links LS won Computer Games Strategy Plus's 1996 sports game of the year award. Links LS was named the tenth best computer game ever by PC Gamer UK in 1997. The editors called it "an object lesson in how every PC game should be made."

Links LS 1997 won Computer Game Entertainment's 1996 "Best Sports Game" prize. The magazine's editors wrote, "It's easy to control, responsive and a lot of fun, and what else can you ask for in a game?" They nominated the game as their overall game of the year, but it lost to Diablo in that category.
