= David Leadbetter (golf instructor) =

American golf instructor

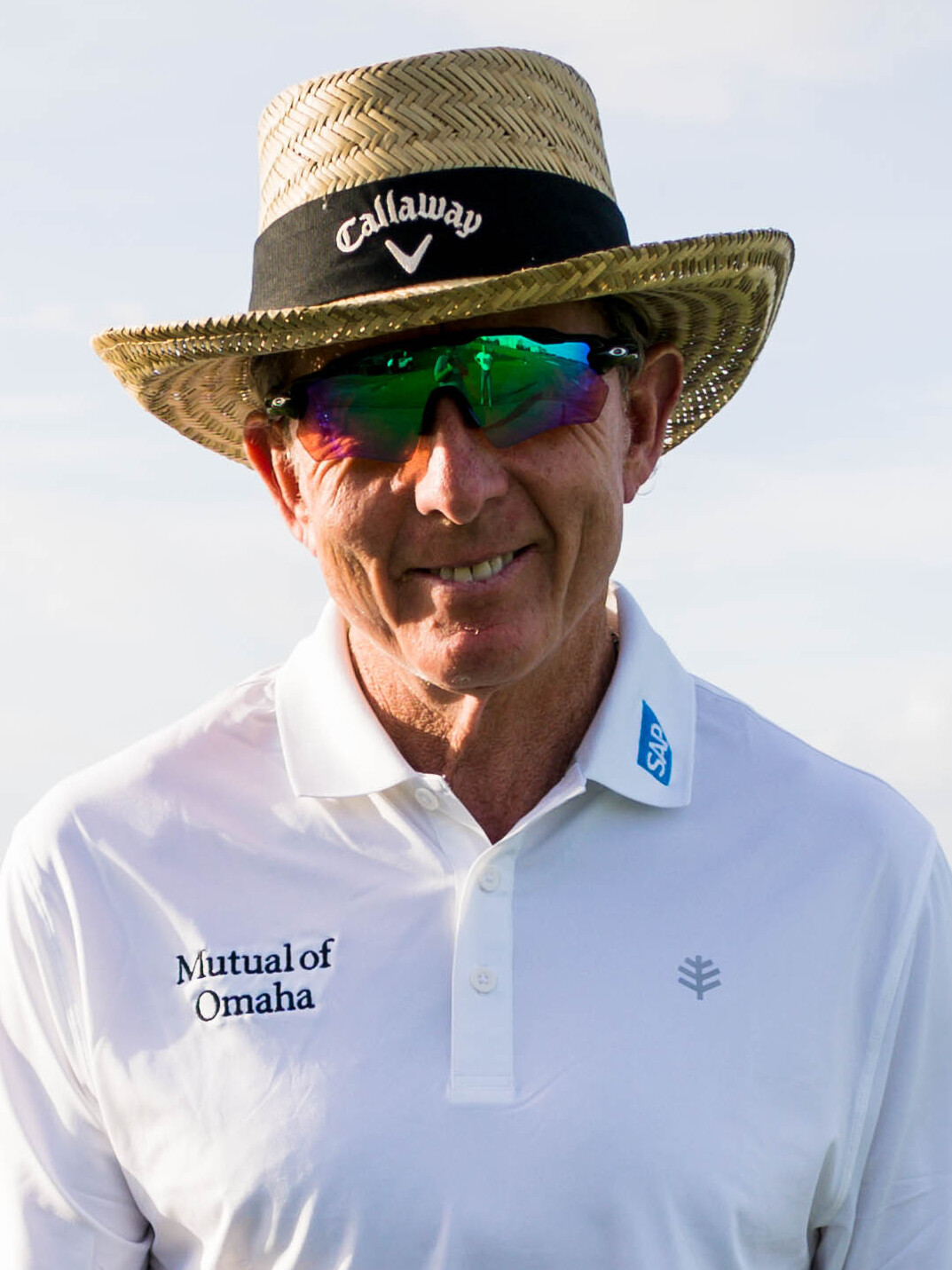
- Leadbetter in 2020
- Born: June 27, 1952 (age 74); Worthing, Sussex, England
- Occupation: Golf instructor
- Spouse: Kelly Leadbetter (m. 1983)
- Children: 3

David Leadbetter (born 27 June 1952) is a golf instructor. During his career he has worked with major championship winning golfers including Nick Price, Nick Faldo and Ernie Els.

== Early life ==
Leadbetter was born in Worthing, Sussex, England. His family moved from southern England to Rhodesia (now Zimbabwe) when Leadbetter was aged seven. As a child, Leadbetter had a serious asthmatic condition which caused his sternum to protrude.

== Career ==
Leadbetter began his career on the European and Southern African golf tours, but had limited success as a player. He had a keen interest in the techniques, mechanics and psychology of the sport and meticulously studied the golf swings of Ben Hogan and Sam Snead. Leadbetter moved into instruction, coaching the Zimbabwean golfers Nick Price and Denis Watson in the early 1980s. In 1985, Leadbetter began working with Nick Faldo. Leadbetter came to wide notice when he rebuilt the swing of Faldo, who went on to win six major championships starting with the 1987 Open Championship.

Leadbetter now runs an international chain of golf academies headquartered at the Reunion Resort and Golf Club just South of Orlando in Kissimmee, Florida, U.S. which has 54 holes of golf in addition to his world class teaching facility. There are also branches elsewhere in North America and in Europe, Asia, and Africa. Since launching the first Leadbetter Golf Academy over 30 years ago, he has coached players to 26 Major Championship titles and over 150 individual worldwide tournament victories. Seven of those players have held first place in the Official World Golf Ranking.

Leadbetter himself concentrates on teaching tour professionals and on instructing other coaches in his methods, who then teach his ideas at his academies. His students include Charles Howell III, Michelle Wie, Lydia Ko and Byeong Hun An. Golf professionals who formerly worked with Leadbetter included Nick Faldo (1985–1998), Greg Norman (1997), and Ernie Els (1990–2008). Leadbetter was ranked second to Butch Harmon on the 2005–2006 edition of Golf Digest's list of the "50 Greatest Teachers" in the United States.

Throughout his career, Leadbetter has also written eight books about golf swings. He has also overseen the development of various golf training media, products and services. His books have sold two million copies making him one of the best-selling golf instruction authors in the world.

=== Trained champions ===
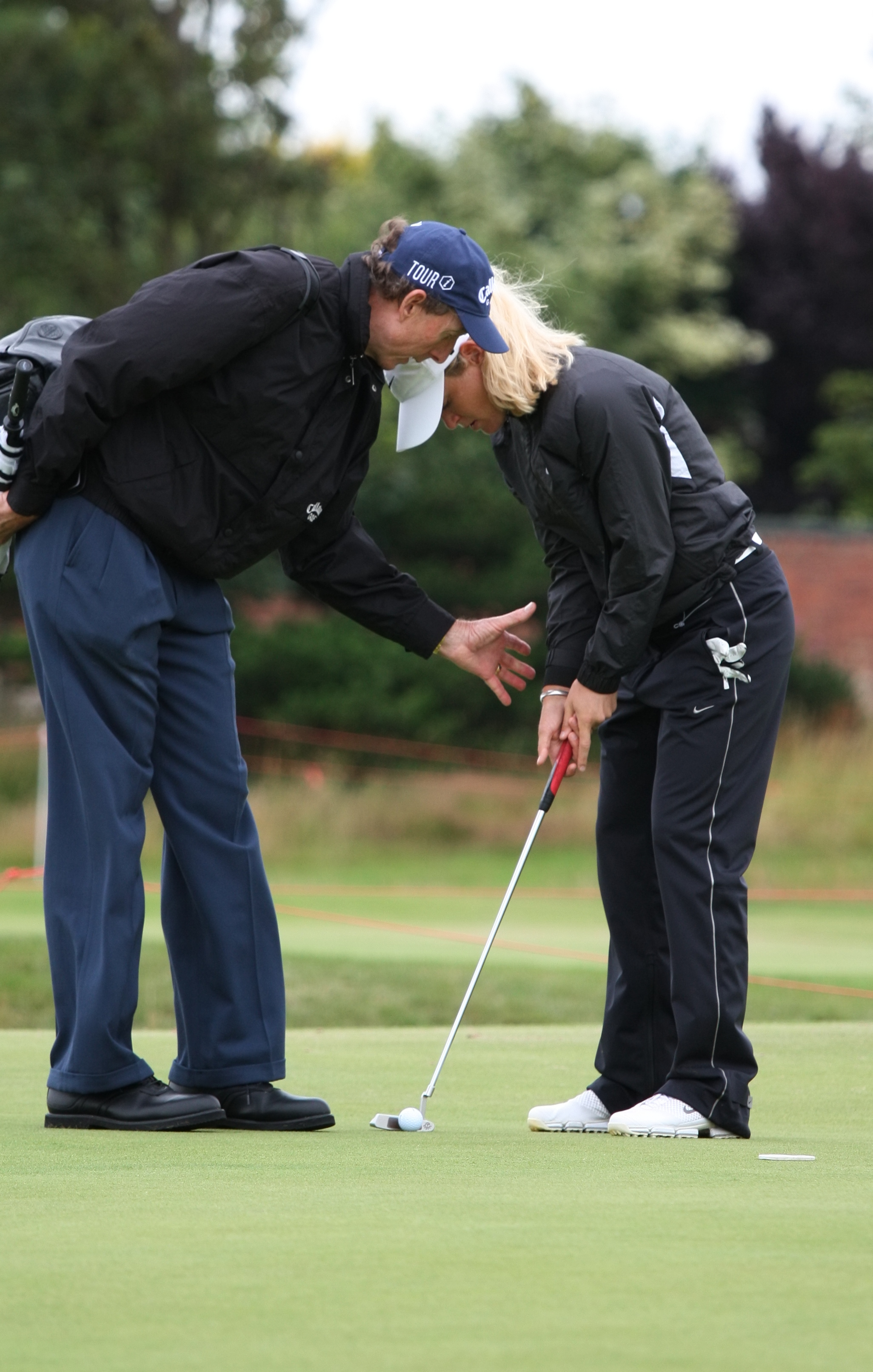
Suzann Pettersen and her coach, Leadbetter, at the 2009 Women's British Open.

The following male golfers whom Leadbetter coached went on to win the following major tournaments:

- Ian Baker-Finch – 1991 Open Championship
- Ernie Els – 1994, 1997 U.S. Open, 2002, 2012 Open Championship
- Nick Faldo – 1989, 1990, 1996 Masters, 1987, 1990, 1992 Open Championship
- Trevor Immelman – 2008 Masters
- Nick Price – 1992, 1994 PGA Championships, 1994 Open Championship

=== Video games ===
Leadbetter appeared in the 1992 video game David Leadbetter's Greens, a MS-DOS port of MicroProse Golf. He also appeared in the Wii-exclusive My Personal Golf Trainer, released in the fall of 2010. Trainer is distinguished from other golf games on the platform by requiring the use of the Wii MotionPlus, while also supporting the Wii Balance Board, taking complete advantage of the Wii's motion controls and accessories to provide authentic golf training.

== Personal life ==
Leadbetter and his wife, Kelly (an LPGA Tour professional), their sons Andy and James and their daughter Hally, live in Sarasota, Florida.
