= Cliffs of Dover (disambiguation) =

The White Cliffs of Dover are cliffs which form part of the coastline of England, facing the Strait of Dover.

Cliffs of Dover may also refer to:

- "Cliffs of Dover" (1984), an instrumental composition by American guitarist Eric Johnson;
- IL-2 Sturmovik: Cliffs of Dover (2011), a combat flight simulation video game by Maddox Games, the developers of IL-2 Sturmovik (2001).

== See also ==
- White Cliffs of Dover (disambiguation)
