= Dover (surname) =

Origin
- Origin: Celtic
- Meaning: the waters
- Region of origin: England, Northern Germany

Dover is a toponymic surname of Celtic origin used in English and German names.

== English surname etymology ==
Relating to the port of Dover in Kent, England. Named from the river on which it stands, Dover is a Celtic name meaning "the waters" (from the word that later became the modern Welsh word "dwfr" for "water").

== German surname etymology ==
Relating to Doveren, a part of the town Hückelhoven in the Rhineland of uncertain etymology. Its origin is possibly also Celtic and thereby related in meaning to the English name as well.

== People with the surname Dover ==
- Cedric Dover (1904–1961), British-Indian entomologist, poet, and writer
- Connie Dover, American singer/songwriter
- Den Dover (born 1938), British politician
- Eric Dover (born 1967), American musician
- Gabriel Dover (1937–2018), British geneticist
- Kenneth Dover (1920–2010), British academic; former Chancellor of the University of St Andrews
- Kieran Dover (born 1996), Australian footballer
- Mary Dover (fl. 1908), Canadian chemist
- Mildred Dover (born 1941), former Canadian politician
- Robert Dover (Cotswold Games) (1575–1641), English captain and attorney
- Robert Dover (equestrian) (born 1958), American Olympic equestrian
- Rupert Dover, Hong Kong police officer

=== Pseudonyms ===
- Ben Dover, stage name of Simon James Honey (born 1956), English pornographic actor
