= Links (series) =

Golfing video game series

- Genre: Sports
- Developers: Access Software; Microsoft
- Publishers: Access Software; Microsoft
- First release: Links: The Challenge of Golf; 1990
- Latest release: Links 2004; 2003
- Spin-offs: Microsoft Golf

Links is a series of golf simulation video games first developed by Access Software and published from 1990 to 2003. The Links series was a flagship brand for Access. The first game, Links: The Challenge of Golf, won Computer Gaming World's 1991 Action Game of the Year award. Microsoft acquired Access Software in 1999 and continued the series. Microsoft also produced its own series of golf games, based on Links, under the title Microsoft Golf.

Several versions of the game and expansion packs (containing new courses and golfers mainly) were created for the Mac and IBM PC compatibles over the years. In 1996, Access Software introduced Links LS 1997, the first of several Links games to use the LS (Legends in Sports) title. A version for the Xbox named Links 2004 was released in November 2003. It would be the final game in the series. In March 2004, Microsoft announced the cancellation of its 2004 lineup of sports games, allowing the company to focus on improving such games. The company stated, "Links is something that we're taking a hard look at what we need to do." At the end of 2004, Microsoft sold Indie Built (formerly Access Software) to Take-Two Interactive. Indie Built was later shut down in 2006.

Many members of the development team now work for TruGolf, a golf simulator company based out of Centerville, Utah. In 2021, TruGolf re-acquired the rights to the Links series, re-releasing classic editions on GOG, as well as a new title, Links E6, the first in 17 years.

== List of games ==
The following games were developed by Access Software

- Links: The Challenge of Golf (1990) Amiga, MS-DOS, Sega CD
- Links: The Challenge of Golf (1992) Tandy Video Information System
- Links 386 Pro (1992) MS-DOS
  - Links Pro (1993), the Classic Mac OS version of Links 386 Pro
- Links LS 1997 (1996) MS-DOS
- Links LS 1998 (1997) Windows 95
- Links LS 1999 (1998) Windows

Microsoft produced the following games after its purchase of Access Software in 1999.

- Links Extreme (1999) Windows
- Links LS 2000 (1999) Windows
- Links 2001 (2000) Windows
  - Links Championship Edition (2001) Windows (includes Links 2001, Links Expansion Pack, a course designer, a course converter and 4 new courses)
- Links 2003 (2002) Windows Microsoft Game Studios
  - Links 2003 Championship Edition (2003) Windows (includes Links 2003 and Links 2003 Championship Courses)
- Links 2004 (2003) Xbox

=== Course disks ===
The following disks add additional courses to the main Links games.

- Links: Championship Course: Pinehurst Country Club (1991) MS-DOS
- Links: Championship Course: Firestone Country Club (1991) Amiga, MS-DOS
- Links: Championship Course: Hyatt Dorado Beach Resort (1991) MS-DOS
- Links: Championship Course: Bay Hill Club & Lodge (1991) MS-DOS
- Links: Championship Course: Bountiful Golf Course (1991) Amiga, MS-DOS
- Links: Championship Course: Barton Creek (1991) MS-DOS
- Links: Championship Course: Mauna Kea (1992) MS-DOS
- Links: Championship Course: Troon North (1992) MS-DOS
- Links: Championship Course: Banff Springs (1992) MS-DOS
- Links: Championship Course: The Belfry (1992) MS-DOS
- Links: Championship Course: Innisbrook - Copperhead (1993) MS-DOS
- Links: Championship Course: Pebble Beach (1993) MS-DOS
- Links: Championship Course: Bighorn (1994) MS-DOS
- Links: Championship Course: Castle Pines (1994) MS-DOS
- Links: Championship Course: Prairie Dunes (1995) DOS
- Links: Championship Course: Cog Hill (1995) MS-DOS
- Links: Championship Course: Riviera (1995) MS-DOS
- Links: Fantasy Course: Devils Island (1995) MS-DOS
- Links Championship Course: Pelican Hill (1996) DOS, Windows
- Links Championship Course: Valderrama (1997) Windows
- Links Championship Course: Oakland Hills (1997) Windows
- Links: Championship Course: Valhalla (1997) Windows
- Links Championship Course: Congressional Country Club (1998) Windows
- Links LS 2000 10-Course Pack (2000) Windows
- Links Expansion Pack (2001) Windows (for Links 2001)
- Links 2003 Championship Courses (2002) Windows
- Links Golf Courses Library (several versions)

=== Microsoft Golf ===
Before its purchase of Access Software, Microsoft published a series of golf games similar to Links, under the title Microsoft Golf. The first three games in the series are Windows-compatible versions of the early Links games, which were published for MS-DOS. The first three entries in the Microsoft Golf series were developed by Access Software for Microsoft, and were sometimes labeled by publications as Links Lite. Microsoft subsequently published Microsoft Golf 1998 Edition and 1999 Edition, which were developed by Friendly Software as separate games not based on Links. After Access Software was acquired by Microsoft in 1999, Microsoft produced Microsoft Golf 2001 Edition, which was based on Links, and then discontinued the Microsoft Golf series to continue with the Links series. The following games were produced in the Microsoft Golf series:

- Microsoft Golf (1992) Windows 3.1
- Microsoft Golf: Multimedia Edition (1993) Windows 3.1
- Microsoft Golf 2.0 (1994) Windows 3.1/95
- Microsoft Golf 3.0 (1996) Windows 95
- Microsoft Golf 1998 Edition (1998) Windows 95
- Microsoft Golf 1999 Edition (1998) Windows 95
- Microsoft Golf 2001 Edition (2000) Windows 98

== Reception ==
Aggregate review scores
Game	GameRankings	Metacritic
Links LS 1999	85%	
Links Extreme	51%	
Links LS 2000	79%	
Links 2001		86/100
Links 2003		82/100
Links 2004		80/100

Computer Gaming World in 1996 ranked the 1990 version of Links fifth on the magazine's list of the most innovative computer games, stating that the game "may have inspired more 'business machine upgrades' than any other game". In 1996 Next Generation ranked it 69th on their "Top 100 Games of All Time", contending that "many prefer EA's PGA series, but Links takes the title by a hair's breadth. With real life courses, and enough stats, sliders, and options to choke a horse, Links re-creates everything but the swing (which is still accomplished with a 'three click' power bar)."

During 1999, Links LS 2000 sold 104,225 copies and earned $4.6 million in the United States. Links 2001 rose to 240,000 copies and $8.2 million in the United States by August 2006, which made it the 84th-best-selling computer game released between January 2000 and August 2006 in the region. Combined sales of all Links games released in the 2000s reached 720,000 copies in the United States by August 2006.

In the United States, Links Championship Edition sold over 100,000 copies by August 2006.

Links 2003 was a nominee for PC Gamer US's "2002 Best Sports Game" award, which ultimately went to Tiger Woods PGA Tour 2003. The magazine's Dan Morris called Links 2003 "a terrific game".

== See also ==
- Leader Board
- Jack Nicklaus series
