= White Cliffs of Dover (disambiguation) =

The White Cliffs of Dover are cliffs which form part of the coastline of England, facing the Strait of Dover.

White Cliffs of Dover may also refer to:

- The White Cliffs of Dover (film), a 1944 American romance film based on a verse-novel by Alice Duer Miller
- "(There'll Be Bluebirds Over) The White Cliffs of Dover", a 1941 song written by Walter Kent and Nat Burton, popularized by Vera Lynn

== See also ==
- Cliffs of Dover (disambiguation)
