= Dover sole =

Dover sole refers to two species of flatfish:

- The common sole, Solea solea, found in European waters, the "Dover sole" of European cookery
- Microstomus pacificus, the Pacific Dover sole, found in the northeastern Pacific and called "Dover sole" along the Pacific coast of America
