= Dover (truck) =

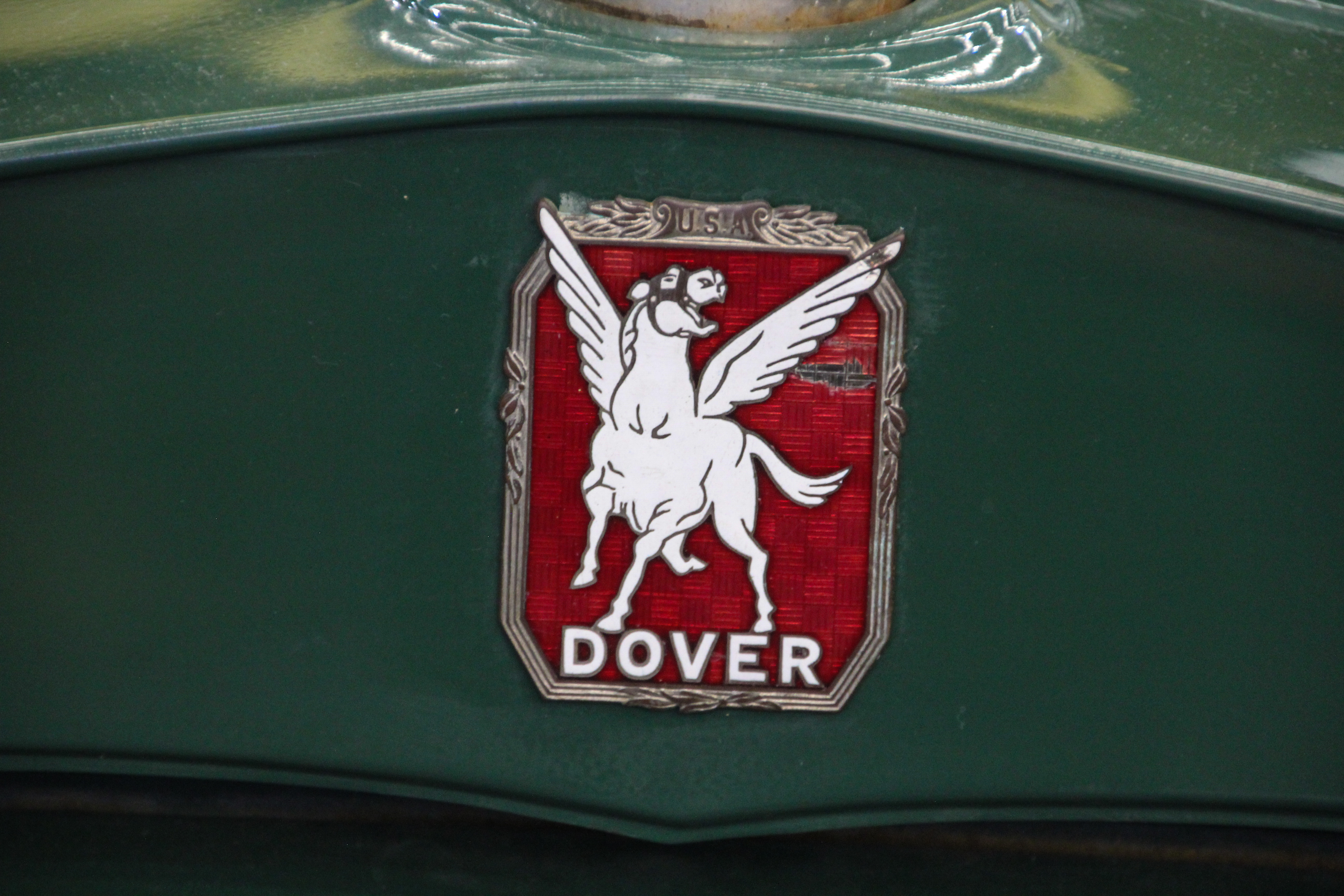
Dover radiator grille emblem on commercial van

Dover was a make of trucks, owned by the Hudson Motor Car Company of Detroit, Michigan. Hudson announced the Dover brand in July 1929 as "Dover, built by Hudson Motors."

Dover trucks were based on Hudson's Essex car chassis. At introduction, they were available as a "Screenside Express", Canopy Express, Open Flatbed, Panel Delivery and Cab and Chassis. Prices ranged between $595 and $895. Bodies for the trucks were built by Hercules of Evansville, Indiana.

The largest purchaser of Dover Trucks was the United States Postal Service which put the vehicles into service for mail transport and delivery vehicles. The Dover was a durable vehicle; USPS reported using some of the vehicles well into the 1950s.

The Dover was pulled from the market in either 1930 or 1931, with Hudson's production records being unspecific. The number of survivor vehicles is very limited; one known restored mail truck was last known to be owned by a private collector in Michigan. A fully restored U.S. mail truck is on display at Hostetler's Hudson Museum in Shipshewana, Indiana.

Hudson also offered these trucks under the Essex nameplate through 1932, subsequently replacing them with a new Terraplane line.

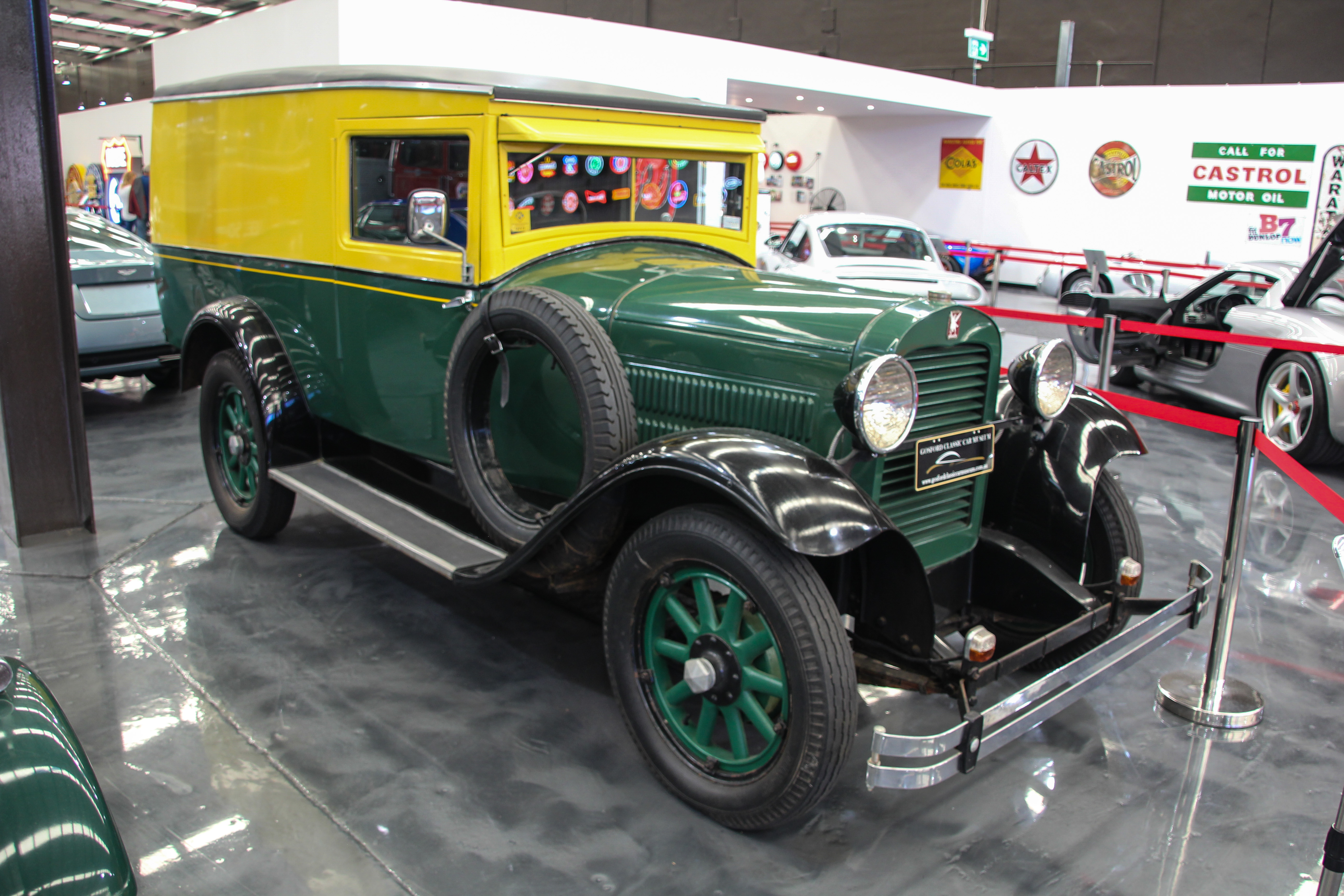
1929 Dover commercial van

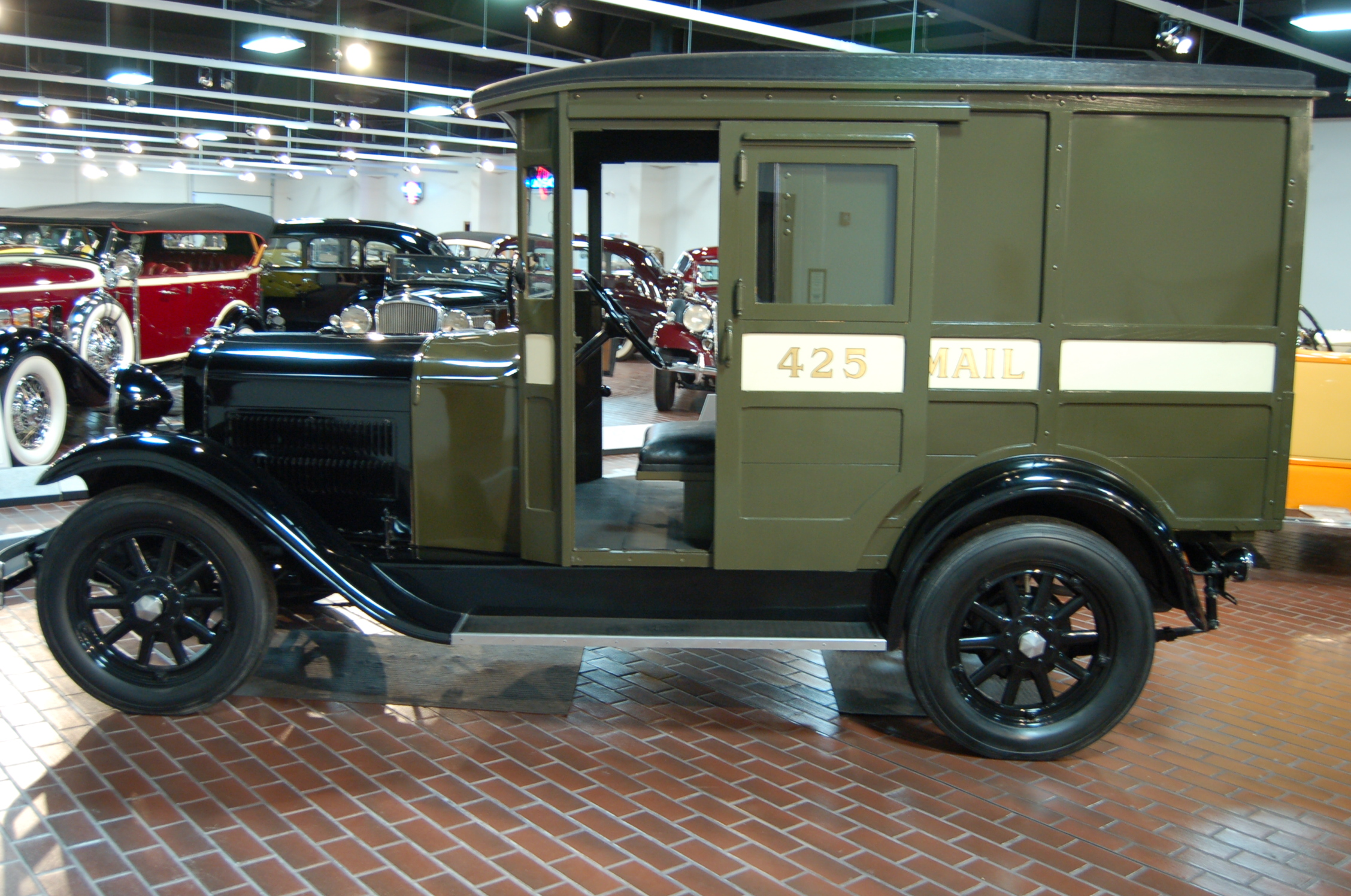
US Postal Service van
