= Mary Dover =

Canadian chemist

Mary Violette Dover
- Born: Peterborough, Ontario, Canada
- Education: McGill University (B.A., M.S.); University of Breslau (Ph.D.)
- Scientific career
- Fields: Chemistry
- Workplaces: McGill University; Mount Holyoke College; University of Missouri; Hercules Powder Company

Mary Violette Dover (fl. 1908) was a Canadian chemist.

== Life ==
Dover was born in Peterborough, Ontario, Canada; her date of birth is unknown. She attended McGill University and was awarded her B.A. degree in 1898 and her M.S. degree the following year. She enrolled in the University of Breslau and received her Ph.D. degree in 1908. While still in graduate school, Dover started working and was a demonstrator in chemistry in 1902–03 and then was a lecture assistant in chemistry from 1903 to 1905. Upon her return to North America in 1909, she became an instructor at Mount Holyoke College for five years and then briefly became an instructor at the University of Missouri before she was promoted to assistant professor in 1915. Dover worked for the Hercules Powder Company in 1918–19 before returning to Missouri where she was promoted to associate professor in 1928. She was treasurer of the Missouri section of the American Chemical Society from 1922 until she was elected as the vice president in 1932. The exact date of her death isn't known, but it was probably between 1933 and 1938.

== Work ==
"While at McGill, Dover coauthored a paper on an analytical reaction used to separate copper, showing previous interpretations were incorrect. She also studied a reaction involving organic magnesium compounds. During the period 1910–1917 Dover investigated the separation of cadmium from organic electrolytes, solubilities in nonaqueous solutions, and the efficiencies of desiccants and of reflux condensers. Subsequent research concerned heats of combustion of oils and gases, lubricants, and petroleum."
