= Links LS 1999 =

1998 sports video game

- Developer: Access Software
- Publishers: NA: Access Software; EU: Eidos Interactive
- Series: Links
- Platform: Microsoft Windows
- Release: NA: October 21, 1998; EU: 1998
- Genre: Sports
- Modes: Single-player, multiplayer

Links LS 1999 is a video game developed and published by Access Software for Microsoft Windows in 1998, and is part of the Links video game series. It follows Links LS 1998 and was succeeded by Links LS 2000.

== Reception ==
Reception

Aggregate score
Aggregator	Score
GameRankings	85%

Review scores
Publication	Score
AllGame	4.5/5 stars
CNET Gamecenter	9/10
Computer Games Strategy Plus	4.5 stars
Computer Gaming World	4.5 stars
GameRevolution	A−
GameSpot	9.1/10
PC Accelerator	9/10
PC Gamer (US)	94%
PC PowerPlay	86%
PC Zone	50%

The game received favorable reviews according to the review aggregation website GameRankings.

Excluding hunting and fishing games, the game was the tenth-best-selling computer sports game of the U.S. during 1998, with sales of 95,176 units. In 1999, it was the country's fourth-highest computer sports seller, again discounting hunting, fishing and racing games. It sold 114,784 copies and earned $5.1 million in the region that year.

The game was a finalist for Computer Gaming World's 1998 "Best Sports" award, which ultimately went to FIFA: Road to World Cup 98, FIFA 99 and World Cup 98 (collectively). PC Gamer US likewise nominated the game as the best sports game of 1998, although it lost to NBA Live 99. They wrote, "[W]hile the changes weren't revolutionary, enough was done to keep Links LS 1999 at the forefront of the very competitive golf category." It was also a finalist for the "PC Sports Game of the Year" award at the AIAS' 2nd Annual Interactive Achievement Awards, for the Best Sports Game award at the 1998 CNET Gamecenter Awards, and for the "Sports Game of the Year" award at GameSpot's Best & Worst of 1998 Awards, all of which also went to FIFA 99.
