= Links LS 1998 =

1997 sports video game

- Developer: Access Software
- Publisher: Access Software
- Series: Links
- Platform: Microsoft Windows
- Release: July 2, 1997
- Genre: Sports
- Modes: Single-player, multiplayer

Links LS 1998 is a golf video game developed and published by Access Software. It is part of the Links video game series, following Links LS (1996). It was released in 1997, and is the first game in the series to be published for Microsoft Windows. The game was well received, and was followed by Links LS 1999.

== Gameplay ==
Links LS 1998 Edition includes six game modes and features Arnold Palmer as a playable golfer. It also has a multiplayer option, and features four golf courses. Additional courses were released through add-on disks.

== Reception ==
=== Critical reviews ===
Reception

Review scores
Publication	Score
CNET Gamecenter	8/10
Computer Games Strategy Plus	4/5
Computer Gaming World	5/5
GameSpot	9.1/10
PCMag	5/5
The Sydney Morning Herald	4/5

=== Sales ===
Links LS 1998 debuted at #4 on PC Data's computer game sales chart for the month of July 1997. It secured ninth and tenth place in its following two months, respectively, but was absent from October's top 20. For December, it returned to PC Data's charts with a 19th-place finish.

During 1998, Links LS 1998 claimed positions in PC Data's monthly top 20 from January through March. After two months' absence, it returned to #17 in June. During the first six months of 1998, Links LS 1998 was the United States' 16th-best-selling computer game, with an average retail price of $43 for the period. It exited the monthly charts again after holding positions 13 in July and 16 in August. Excluding hunting and fishing games, Links LS 1998 was the United States' best-selling computer sports game of the year, with sales of 193,434 units and revenues of almost $8 million for 1998 alone. It was the 16th-best-selling computer game across all genres in the United States between January and November, and ranked 34th for the year overall.

=== Awards ===
Computer Gaming World, GameSpot and the Academy of Interactive Arts & Sciences all nominated Links LS 1998 as their pick for the best computer sports title of 1997, but these awards went variously to Baseball Mogul, CART Precision Racing, NHL 98, and FIFA: Road to World Cup 98. The editors of Computer Gaming World wrote that it "made the world's best golf simulation even better", while those of GameSpot remarked, "Each time Access Software releases a new version [of Links], it gets harder and harder to fathom how this game could get any better - yet it does."

In 1998, PC Gamer declared it the 11th-best computer game ever released, and the editors wrote that "an enhanced color palette, quicker screen re-draws, more camera angles, and built-in TCP/IP support nudged this series a few inches closer to perfection".
