= Gimme (golf) =

Easy shot in golf that is agreed to be left unplayed

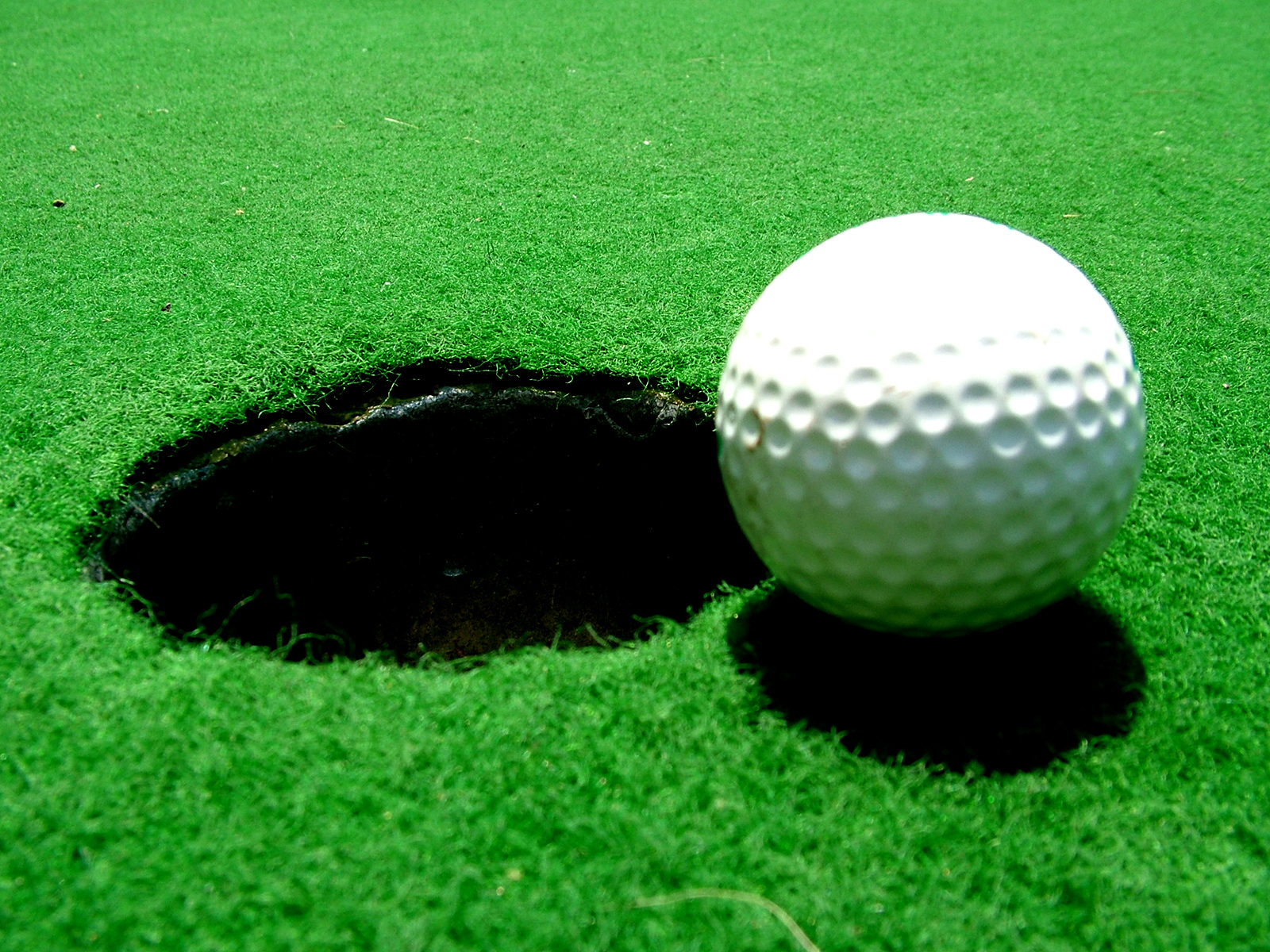
A ball position that would be eligible for a 'gimme' in a casual match

In golf, a gimme is a shot that the other players agree can count automatically without being played.

When a player has only a very short putt left to play, other players may grant a gimme (i.e., one stroke is counted), but the ball is not played. A gimme is a time-saving convention under the tacit assumption that the putt would not have been missed, e.g., when the ball is within a few inches of the hole.

Gimmes are not allowed by the rules in stroke play, though the practice is common in casual matches. However, in match play, either player may formally concede a stroke, a hole, or the entire match at any time, and this may not be refused or withdrawn. A player in match play will generally concede a tap-in or other short putt by their opponent.

The word is a colloquial contraction of the phrase "give me".

== See also ==
- Mulligan, informal permission to replay a stroke that went wrong
- Glossary of golf
