= Mulligan (games) =

Second chance to perform an action

A mulligan is a second chance to perform an action, usually after the first chance went wrong through bad luck or a blunder. Its best-known use is in golf, whereby it refers to a player being allowed, only informally, to replay a stroke, although that is against the formal rules of golf. The term has also been applied to other sports, games, and fields generally. The origin of the term is unclear.

== Possible origin ==
The earliest known use of the term is in a 1931 issue of the Detroit Free Press, somewhat predating the earliest citation in the Oxford English Dictionary from 1936. The most common explanation of the term's origin is that it was named after a golfer with the surname Mulligan, the main candidates being either David Mulligan or John A. "Buddy" Mulligan; however, no connection with these figures is recorded until several decades after the term entered common use. In 2017, Peter Reitan suggested that the term first arose in baseball sports writing and was associated with a fictional baseball player "Swat Mulligan".

=== Eponymous origin theories ===
The United States Golf Association (USGA) cites three stories espousing that the term derived from the name of a Canadian golfer, David B. Mulligan (1869–1954). At one time, he was the manager of the Waldorf Astoria Hotel in New York City. He played at the Country Club of Montreal golf course, in Saint-Lambert near Montreal during the 1920s. There are three variations in reports indicating his being the Mulligan associated with the term. One version has it that one day after hitting a poor tee shot, Mulligan immediately re-teed and shot again. He called it a "correction shot", but his companions thought it more fitting to name the unorthodox practice after him, and that David Mulligan then brought the concept from Canada to Winged Foot, a golf club in the U.S. A second version has the extra shot allowed for Mulligan due to his being jumpy and shaky after a difficult drive over the Victoria Bridge to the course. The final version of the David Mulligan story gives him an extra shot after having overslept and having rushed to get ready to make the tee time.

An alternative, later story credits a different man named Mulligan – John A. "Buddy" Mulligan, a locker room attendant at Essex Fells Country Club in New Jersey. In the 1930s, he would finish cleaning the locker room and, if no other members appeared, play a round with the assistant pro, Dave O'Connell, and a club member, Des Sullivan, who was a reporter and later, golf editor for the Newark Evening News. One day his first shot was bad and he beseeched O'Connell and Sullivan to allow another shot since they "had been practicing all morning" and he had not. Once they agreed and the round finished, Mulligan began to exclaim proudly for months to the members in his locker room, how he had gotten an extra shot from the duo. The members loved the device and soon began giving themselves "Mulligans" in his honor. Sullivan began using the term in his golf articles in the Newark Evening News. A television program, the Today Show, ran this story around 2005 and have it in their archives. Mulligan was located in the 1970s at the Lyons, New Jersey veterans administration hospital, helping with their golf facility. In his July 22, 1970, column in the Myrtle Beach Sun News, the semi-retired Des Sullivan wrote of finding Mulligan and the history behind the term.

=== Swat Mulligan baseball origin theory ===
In a 2017 blog post, Peter Reitan cast doubt on the eponymous mulligan etymology theories, pointing out that they conflicted with the (then-recent) 1931 antedating in the dictionary. He suggested that the term originated instead with "Swat Mulligan", a fictional baseball player with extraordinary batting skills who appeared in the New York Evening World during the 1910s. Reitan presents quotations from the 1920s in which Mulligan's name is used as a byword for powerful hits, including use of the phrase take a "mulligan" to mean taking a powerful swing at the ball. Reitan suggests that the term then arrived at its current meaning by semantic drift. The 1931 Detroit Free Press citation has been suggested to represent a transitional form, in that the usage involves both a do-over and a powerful shot:

All were waiting to see what Byrd would do on the 290-yard 18th, with a creek in front of the well-elevated green. His first drive barely missed carrying the creek and he was given a “mulligan” just for fun. The second not only was over the creek on the fly, but was within a few inches of the elevated green. That’s some poke!

== Use in golf ==
In golf, a mulligan is a stroke that is replayed from the spot of the previous stroke without penalty, due to an errant shot made on the previous stroke. The result is that the hole is played and scored as if the first errant shot had never been made. This practice is disallowed entirely by strict rules in formal play and players who attempt it or agree to let it happen may be disqualified from sanctioned competitions. However, in casual play, "mulligans" speed play by reducing the time spent searching for a lost ball, reduce frustration, and increase enjoyment of the game because a player can "shake off" a bad shot more easily with their second chance.

A "gilligan", the opposite of a "mulligan", is to redo a successful stroke when so requested by an opponent.

As mulligans are not covered by strict rules – except to prohibit them – there are many variations of the practice among groups of players who do allow them in friendly games. If a mulligan is allowed to be used to replay any shot, typically each player is limited to 18 per round, sometimes 9 in the first 9 holes and 9 in the second nine. Traditionally, mulligans can only be played on tee shots (which are notoriously difficult to make accurately), and sometimes they may only be played on the first tee shot of the round (known as a "breakfast ball"). In the case of a mulligan used to replay the first tee shot, multiple "mulligans" may be allowed under different names (Finnegan, Branagan, Flanagan, or Craig) until the player has hit a playable tee shot.

Although certain players may wish to bank their shots, this is deemed unsportsmanlike and is generally frowned upon. Golf tournaments held for charity may charge for mulligans to collect more money for the charity.

== Use in other games ==
In Titan, the rules of the 1982 version allow a "First move mulligan" for an unfortunate dice roll.

=== Card games ===
In collectible card games, a mulligan refers to the process of adjusting which cards are in a player's initial hand of cards. Card games have various official rules for how mulligans are performed.

In Magic: The Gathering, a player may declare a mulligan after drawing their initial hand at the beginning of each game. If a player chooses to do so, that player shuffles their current hand back into their deck, draws a new hand of seven cards, then puts one card on the bottom of their deck for each time they've mulliganed this game. The player may repeat this until satisfied, or until the number of cards in their hand reaches zero. The mulligan process has changed drastically over the history of the game. The current style is known as the London mulligan, as it was first used at a Mythic Championship tournament held in London.

Hearthstone allows players to mulligan at the start of the game by placing any number of cards in their opening hand back into their deck, each to be replaced with a random different card. Mulliganing one's entire hand in hopes of getting a specific card is referred to as a hard mulligan.

In the Pokémon Trading Card Game, each player needs at least one Basic Pokémon card in their opening hand to start the game. If there is no Basic Pokémon card in hand, the player must reveal their hand, shuffle it into their deck and draw a new hand of seven cards. If both players must mulligan, each of them reveals their hand, shuffles it into their deck and draws seven cards. If only one player must mulligan, their opponent may draw a number of cards up to the number of mulligans they took. (Before EX Ruby & Sapphire, that player may draw up to 2 cards per mulligan.) Mulligans are repeated until each player has at least one Basic Pokémon card in hand.

In Dragon Ball Super Card Game, the player is given one opportunity to mulligan. They may return any number of cards into their deck and shuffle it, then draw the same number of cards.

Ashes: Rise of the Phoenixborn bypasses mulligan rules common to other card games, and instead has a "First Five" rule, allowing players to pick the specific five cards which will comprise their opening hand.

In KeyForge, a player who is dissatisfied with their starting hand may discard it and draw a new hand with one fewer card.

In Legends of Runeterra, a player who is dissatisfied with their hand may shuffle any number of cards back into their deck, and draw the same number of cards.

In Gwent: The Witcher Card Game, players can mulligan up to two cards at the start of each round, replacing it with a random card from their deck. The player who goes first in Round 1 gets an additional mulligan. Also, as players draw three cards at the beginning of a round, but cannot have more than ten cards in hand, each drawn card that would increase their hand size over ten becomes a bonus mulligan instead.

In Berserk players start the game by drawing 15 cards from their decks and hiring an army from this hand by expending crystals. The player can make an unlimited amount of mulligans to replace these 15 cards, with each one costing 1 gold crystal from the player's initial pool of 24.

In knock-out whist an eliminated player may ask for a "dog's chance" in the next round. That player is then dealt a single card (regardless of how may cards would normally be in that hand). If the player succeeds in winning a trick with that card, they stay in for the next round, otherwise they are eliminated again.

In Digimon Card Game, a player who is unhappy with their starting hand may discard it and draw a new hand, but only once.

== Use outside games ==
=== Politics ===
In politics, the term mulligan race or mulligan candidate is used to describe a losing or disqualified candidate in a party primary or nomination, who, nevertheless, runs in the general election on another ballot line, either as an independent or as the nominee for a third party. In the 2006 Connecticut U.S. Senate race, many Ned Lamont supporters accused Senator Joseph Lieberman of running a mulligan race as an independent, since he had lost the Democratic Party primary. Andrew Cuomo was widely accused of running a mulligan race after his loss to Zohran Mamdani in the 2025 New York City Democratic Mayoral primary, choosing to continue his campaign as an independent afterwards; Cuomo lost the general election to Mamdani as well. Several U.S. states have so-called sore-loser laws specifically designed to prevent such failed candidates from appearing on the ballot in the general election in such a manner.

As a general rule, in liberal democracies outside the United States there are few (if any) laws that would prevent failed or disqualified nomination candidates from contesting the general election, although mounting such a challenge often results in expulsion or permanent ostracization from the candidate's former party. In jurisdictions using the Westminster system or single-member districts, mulligan candidates are a fairly common occurrence, especially in cases where the mulligan candidate alleges a nomination contest was lost due to unfair electoral practices or was disqualified by a former party without reasonable cause.

Related terms include mulligan leader and mulligan party, the latter of which is used to describe a party founded or taken over by a failed leadership candidate (or deposed former leader) from another party. A recent example of such a party is the People's Party of Canada, founded by failed Conservative Party of Canada leadership candidate, Maxime Bernier, while a notable historical party from the same country was the provincial Newfoundland Reform Liberal Party, founded and led by former Newfoundland and Labrador Premier Joey Smallwood. Although such parties rarely become serious contenders to form a government in general elections, if popular enough, they can cause vote splitting that especially in first past the post voting systems, may severely damage the electoral prospects of the mulligan leader's former party.

In the 2008 American Democratic primary elections, the term mulligan was used to describe a proposed redo of elections in Michigan and Florida, after their results were declared invalid due to the early scheduling of the contests, against Democratic party rules.

The term also is coming into use to describe situations (that are becoming increasingly common in the age of social media) where a political party's candidate or delegate is suddenly replaced by the party leadership on the eve of an election or convention, usually either because the person's loyalty to the party or its leaders have come into question or because unsavory details regarding his past or character surface that warrant drastic measures to mitigate damage to the reputation or electoral prospects of the party or its leadership. Electoral rules and laws mostly drafted prior to the advent of social media, often severely restrict or prohibit the replacement of candidates after the nomination period has closed, which might be weeks or even months prior to the final vote. Proposals to relax such rules to allow parties to deal with to the increased likelihood of a candidate's dodgy past coming to light at an inopportune moment have been mocked as mulligan rules by critics.

=== Finance ===
In finance, the term is used to refer to provisions in syndicated loan documentation where lenders only get the right to accelerate their loans after two financial covenants are breached. This practice is rare today, but was popular with sponsors at the height of the credit boom in 2006-07, allowing them to postpone the date at which they needed to start negotiating a restructuring with lenders. The loan "mulligan" is to be contrasted with a "deemed cure" clause that would allow a covenant breach to be disregarded in the event the next covenant tests were met. In addition, it typically remains possible with loans carrying financial covenants for a borrower to "cure" covenant breaches after the event by injecting new cash equity.

== See also ==
- Gimme (golf)
- Lucky loser
