= Microsoft Golf =

1992 video game

- Developer: Microsoft
- Publisher: Microsoft
- Platform: Microsoft Windows
- Release: 1992
- Genre: Sports

Microsoft Golf is a video game spin-off of the Links series.

== Gameplay ==
Microsoft Golf: The True Challenge of Golf for Windows adapts the Links game engine for Windows, and a Multimedia Edition was also published.

== Reception ==
Patrick Marshall for InfoWorld said "The scenery is great, the animation of the players is fantastic, and if you've got sound equipment, you can even hear the birds chirping."

Scott A. May for Compute! reviewed Microsoft Golf for Windows Multimedia Edition and said "the multimedia edition adds many enjoyable extraneous effects but few indispensable enhancements. Newcomers to Links and Multimedia PC games in general, however, will find this product absolutely dazzling."

Mike Kogan for Electronic Entertainment said "this game breaks new ground in its integration of videos into the game play and will be an asset to any sports-loving MPC owner."
