= MSN Games =

Casual gaming web site

- Website type: Web Games
- Owner: Microsoft
- Creators: MSN; Microsoft
- Website: zone.msn.com
- Commercial: Yes, ad funded
- Registration: Optional
- Launched: August 7, 1996; 30 years ago (as Zone.com)

MSN Games (also known as The Zone, Zone.com and formerly known as The Village, Internet Gaming Zone, MSN Gaming Zone, and MSN Games by Zone.com) is a casual gaming website, with single-player, multiplayer, PC download, and social casino video games. Games are available in free online, trial, and full-featured pay-to-play versions.

MSN Games is a part of Xbox Game Studios, associated with the MSN portal, and is owned by Microsoft, headquartered in Redmond, Washington.

== History ==
The first version of the site, which was then called "The Village", was founded by Kevin Binkley, Ted Griggs, and Hoon Im. In 1996, Steve Murch, an employee of Microsoft, convinced Bill Gates and Steve Ballmer to acquire the small online game site, then owned by Electric Gravity. The site was rebranded to "Internet Gaming Zone" and launched in 1996. In 1998, the service had 600,000 users.

It started with a handful of card and board games like Hearts, Spades, Checkers, Backgammon, and Bridge.

Over the next five years, the Internet Gaming Zone would be renamed several times and would increase in popularity with the introduction of popular retail- and MMORPG-games, such as MechWarrior, Rainbow Six, UltraCorps, Age of Empires, Star Wars Jedi Knight: Dark Forces II, Asheron's Call and Fighter Ace.

The website also featured a community forum which was established in 2006. This lasted until the closure of MSN Groups in 2009.

Microsoft announced in July 2019 that it would be shutting down the Internet series of games built into Windows operating systems. Windows XP and ME games were shut down on July 31, 2019, while the remaining games on Windows 7 were shut down on January 22, 2020 (a little over a week after Microsoft ceased support for Windows 7).

=== CD-ROM matchmaking ===
MSN Games announced the retirement of support for CD-ROM games, chat lobbies, the ZoneFriends client and the Member Plus program, scheduled for June 19, 2006. In a series of public chats held with various administrators and developers of the Zone, MSN outlined its plan to shift its gaming environment into Windows Live Messenger, a more frequently updated client than the outdated ZoneFriends messenger used on the Zone. However, due primarily to MSN's inability to provide a timeframe for the expected replacement of chat lobbies, tournaments, and its Member Plus volunteer moderator program, thousands of players appeared at each session to express their discontent, and began an online petition in an attempt to stop MSN's scheduled changes. As with previous changes, however, MSN continued to stand firm in its commitment to the retirement of its services, citing outdated hardware and lack of economic viability for the old products.

Although alternatives exist to the Zone for CD-ROM gameplay, many Microsoft game studios embedded Zone links and functionality into their games, including Rockstar San Diego's Midtown Madness and the Age of Empires game series developed by Ensemble Studios. Ensemble only began their switch to an in-game matchmaking system with the release of Age of Mythology. Age of Empires III (2005) also had in-game matchmaking.

Games as recent as Flight Simulator 98 and Star Wars Galactic Battlegrounds utilized the Zone's lobby system for matchmaking. For many such games, no replacement service has been announced. The first game in the Flight Simulator series to use in-game matchmaking is Flight Simulator X, released early 2007, leaving a gap of several months without MSN supported matchmaking services.

== Competitors ==
The Zone's first competitors were AOL's Games.com, as well Mplayer.com (and its successor Gamespy), Pogo.com and Sega's Heat.net. Formerly, the site competed with other similar free-game sites, such as Yahoo! Games and msngames.org.

== Volunteers ==
MSN's competition with AOL Games resulted in the creation of a Volunteer Program for the Zone, which AOL also offered. The idea was to have volunteers moderating chat lobbies, hosting tourneys, offering tech support, and interacting with the gamers to collect general feedback. Volunteer moderators on the Zone were initially designated as members of the ‘Zone Team’ (zTeam), with tokens assigned to five teams: the Gaming Team (!), Helproom Team (+), Tournament Hosting Team (%), zStar Team (*), and Tech Support Team (?).

Because of legal complexities when AOL was sued by their volunteers—and the volunteers won the case—MSN Games reformed their policy by contracting a third-party company to manage the program. In 2001, Participate Systems won the contract and would continue to lead the program until its official disbanding. During the volunteer program's conversion to its new management, all previous token designations were replaced with a single "+" token and a new name, the "Member Plus", or MPlus program. Participate Systems was acquired by Outstart.com in November 2004.

The Zone sanctioned a number of independent groups to operate tournaments on the Zone, subject to the groups retaining a tokened tournament director and obeying the Zone Code of Conduct. Groups operated in a number of games, including backgammon, cribbage, chess, hearts, and others. Some of these groups (for example RTW Online's Thunder and MrFixitOnline's Smackdown series of tournaments in the Age of Empires series of games) created an intense following, and the associated intercine rivalries. A few, such as GammonZone and Warpgammon (backgammon) and Pegging Pals (cribbage) even survived the demise of the Zone and migrated to other servers.

Citing MSN's statement regarding the closure of CD-ROM games on the Zone on June 19, 2006, the Member Plus program was also disbanded at that time, due to the removal of chat capabilities from game lobbies and the end of support for the ZoneFriends client.

== Setbacks ==
- In 2000, the site started to be a target of continuous crack attacks. Crackers, script kiddies for the most part, targeted the Zone software. In 2004, the worst crack attack occurred through the use of social engineering, giving the intruders access to the administrator tools. The intruders used their new-found tools to ban players and other site volunteers.
- After the dot-com boom, websites claimed difficulties managing their finances. MSN Games changed its market strategy and left the retail market to focus solely on free and premium games, a decision that finally culminated in their decision to retire support for CD-ROM games and lobbies on June 19, 2006.
- Specialized programs, including the Fighter Ace and Allegiance teams, disbanded during the Zone's transition to the Member Plus program, due primarily to the planned retirement of their associated games.

== Legacy ==
- Personalities such as Bill Gates and his friend, Warren Buffett, have played bridge on the Zone. Garry Kasparov, chess champion, played in a chess game organized by Microsoft. World champion Alex Moiseyev and grandmaster Tim Laverty also played checkers on Zone. The Sheik of The United Arab Emirates invited a few backgammon players from the Zone to play in his "2nd annual Abu Dhabi Backgammon Championship". Many of the "Giants of Backgammon" (top 32 in the world) participated in Zone tournaments, including Neil Kazaross, Johannes Levermann, Steve Sax, Howard Ring, Paul Weaver, Kit Woolsey, and Bill Robertie.
- MSN Games is credited for assisting with the introduction of new games on Windows Live Messenger and the development of Xbox Live Arcade.
- Writer Dorothy Rosencrans documented her experiences at MSN Games, including her encounter with Bill Gates, in her memoir.
- MSN Games is credited with renaming DiamondMine to Bejeweled, which is one of the most popular casual games of all time.
- Members Plus originally utilized a Microsoft-authored program called ZoneCommander to access lobbies directly, bypassing web pages. This was later replaced by ZoneOrchestrator, a program written by two Members Plus which improved upon ZoneCommander by adding chat monitoring facilities and an enhanced user interface. Some years later, ZoneCommander was retired in favor of ZoneOrchestrator, which became the official tool of choice and remained so until the lobbies closed on June 19, 2006.

== See also ==
- Kasparov versus the World
