= Jack Nicklaus 6: Golden Bear Challenge =

1999 video game

- Developer: Hypnos Entertainment
- Publisher: Activision
- Producer: Mike Franco
- Designer: Mike Franco
- Programmer: Scott C. DeFreitas
- Artist: Dale Mauk
- Series: Jack Nicklaus
- Platform: Microsoft Windows
- Release: NA: March 30, 1999
- Genre: Sports video game
- Modes: Single-player, multiplayer

Jack Nicklaus 6: Golden Bear Challenge is a golf video game developed by Hypnos Entertainment and published by Activision for Microsoft Windows. It is part of a series of golfing games named after golfer Jack Nicklaus, and is the first in the series to feature him as a playable golfer. Producer and designer Mike Franco, who produced previous games in the series, began working on the game in November 1997, when Jack Nicklaus 5 was released.

Full work began on the game in April 1998, and it was released in March 1999. The game received mostly positive reviews, with praise for its graphics, golfer animations, golf course designer feature, and game physics, although in-game commentary by Jim Nantz and Gary McCord was criticized as repetitive and annoying. Sales of the game were poor, with only 20,000 copies sold as of February 2000.

== Gameplay ==
Jack Nicklaus 6: Golden Bear Challenge features six golf courses, all recreations of real courses: Shoal Creek, Muirfield Village, Montecastillo, Sherwood Country Club, Cochise at Desert Mountain, and Nicklaus North in Whistler, British Columbia. The game, like previous installments in the Jack Nicklaus series, includes a golf course designer that allows the player to create a custom course, one hole at a time. The course designer is mostly the same as in previous games, and offers the player various options. Online courses created with the Jack Nicklaus 5 designer could be downloaded from the Internet and converted for use in Jack Nicklaus 6.

The game has 11 single-player modes, including Tournament, Skins, Stroke, and Match Play. The player has three options for hitting a golf ball, including traditional two- or three-click swing meters. Also offered is the Mouse Meter, in which the player uses the computer mouse to simulate the swing, although this option does not play out in real time. The game includes color-coded putting grids.

The player can create customized playing characters using the game's RPG-style setup, in which choosing certain attributes diminishes others. The player can also play as Jack Nicklaus or against him. It is the first game in the series to feature Nicklaus as a playable golfer. Nicklaus also narrates certain scenes and gives tips to the player. In addition, the game features commentary by Jim Nantz and Gary McCord, and an unseen crowd of people react to the player's golf successes and mishaps. The game offers various camera angles, including Smart Replay, which lets the player replay and save a shot from three different angles. At the time of its release, the game offered an online multiplayer option through Microsoft's MSN Gaming Zone.

== Development ==
Mike Franco was the game's producer and designer. He had previously produced the 1997 games Jack Nicklaus 4 and Jack Nicklaus 5, and began working on a new game in the series in November 1997, when the latter game was released. Accolade, which had published the Jack Nicklaus series since 1988, sold the rights to Activision in April 1998, to focus primarily on action games. Activision hired the newly formed Hypnos Entertainment to develop the series' next game. Hypnos Entertainment was made up of team members who worked on earlier Jack Nicklaus games, including Jack Nicklaus Online Golf Tour (1998).

Full work on the new game began in April 1998, after the sale was complete and after Franco joined Hypnos Entertainment. The development team included Scott C. DeFreitas as programmer and Dale Mauk as art director. Franco led the design team, whose intentions for the game included an increase in the realism of the player characters through customizable personalities. Franco considered the customization options to be "probably one of the biggest areas we've improved," stating that with the RPG-style setup, "you can create a character who plays like you do (or want to) in real life."

The game's title is a reference to Nicklaus' nickname, "Golden Bear." The game's tentative title during development was Jack Nicklaus Presents: Golden Bear Challenge. Nicklaus approved his in-game character model, and was much more involved in the game's development than in the previous Jack Nicklaus games. The golf courses featured in the game were designed by Nicklaus in real life, while their in-game counterparts were recreated by Scott Chesney and Brian Silvernail, both experts in the design of online Jack Nicklaus courses. Many new features in the game were added at the suggestion of Jack Nicklaus game players who voiced their opinions through newsgroups and Internet forums.

The polygonal golfing characters were created through motion capture. The development team wrote a golf-focused rendering engine that utilized 3D hardware support, while also using a software-based rendering engine; this combination allowed for improved graphics, as the player's computer hardware was used to render the playable 3D golfer character, while software was used for textures and terrains. The team also added additional and improved on-course animations, including animated water and flags. Considerable time was spent perfecting the golf ball animation and trajectory to be as realistic as possible. Regarding the Mouse Meter option, Franco said "the golfer does not animate at the same time that you move the mouse" because "we wanted simplicity and control," stating, "We want the immediate feedback to come from the meter graphic itself, not from a golfer animation that doesn't tell you very much."

== Release ==
Jack Nicklaus 6: Golden Bear Challenge was released on March 30, 1999, for Microsoft Windows. Upon release, the game contained an issue involving long putts, in which the golf ball would come up considerably short of reaching the hole, even when the player hit it perfectly. Hypnos Entertainment developed a patch in response to several game issues, including crashes and the putting problem. In May 1999, Hypnos Entertainment sent the patch to Activision for quality assurance (QA) testing prior to release. However, the lead QA tester quit before starting any testing, followed by another lead QA tester quitting Activision. This delayed the release of the patch until June 1999.

In addition to the game's six golf courses, nearly 300 online courses from the previous game were also available when Jack Nicklaus 6 was released. One online course was a recreation of North Carolina's Pinehurst No. 2, previously released on the Internet for Jack Nicklaus 4 players. The course was converted for players of Jack Nicklaus 6 and released online in June 1999, coinciding with the 1999 U.S. Open, which was held at Pinehurst.

== Reception ==
Reception

Aggregate score
Aggregator	Score
GameRankings	86%

Review scores
Publication	Score
AllGame	4.5/5
CNET Gamecenter	9/10
Computer Games Strategy Plus	3.5/5
Computer Gaming World	5/5
GamePro	5/5 (Note: GamePro gave the game two 5/5 scores for graphics and overall fun factor, and two 4/5 scores for sound and control.)
GameSpot	9.1/10
Jeuxvideo.com	16/20
PC Accelerator	8/10
PC Gamer (UK)	69%
PC Zone	84%
Chicago Sun-Times	3.5/4
The Cincinnati Enquirer	3.5/4
The Sydney Morning Herald	4/5

Jack Nicklaus 6: Golden Bear Challenge received favorable reviews according to the review aggregation website GameRankings. Critics praised the graphics, including the animated water and flags. Scott A. May of Computer Gaming World considered it "the first golf sim in which the variable skies, breathtaking vistas, and lushly detailed foregrounds are in perfect visual sync." The 3D golfer animations were also praised, with Mark Hill of PC Zone writing that the players "no longer look as if they're in the middle of a bowel movement when they swing, and the animation is incredibly smooth." However, Chuck Hill of Computer Games Strategy Plus wrote that the player animations "may have the most boring and limited reactions ever seen in a golf game." Joel Easley of The News-Sentinel praised the Jack Nicklaus character model for being "very lifelike" in appearance and movement.

Critics praised the course designer as well – with AllGame's Michael L. House calling it the pìèce de résistance – but noted that the instructions on how to use it accounted for most of the game's instruction manual. Computer Gaming World believed that the course designer presented a "steep learning curve" for average players, although PC Zone considered the designer "actually quite easy" to use despite its numerous options. Praise was also given for the game's color-coded putting grids, its low $20 retail price, and the game physics. The Hartford Courant called it the best game in the Jack Nicklaus series and wrote that it "may finally be pulling even" with its rival series, Links. The newspaper also praised the multitude of online courses, but noted that game animations took several seconds to render due to the complexity of the graphics. The Hartford Courant later wrote that the Jack Nicklaus series "in the minds of many reviewers finally eclipsed 'Links'" with the release of Jack Nicklaus 6.

Reviewers criticized Nantz and McCord's commentary as repetitive and annoying, although Marc Saltzman of GamePro also called the commentary a "nice touch," while AllGame considered McCord's commentary to be humorous at times. Crowd noises were also criticized by some as repetitive, although James Bottorff of The Cincinnati Enquirer praised the crowd comments and called the commentary "right on target." Chris Hudak of Wired wrote that the commentary "while a well-meant concept, is downright embarrassing at times," stating that, "A competent escape from the rough will sometimes elicit a crack like, 'That shot had a lot of ugly on it,' while a putt in the wrong direction will go unnoticed." Hudak also stated that casual players unfamiliar with golf terms would be confused by the game and its multitude of options. PC Accelerator considered the commentary to be decent, but criticized it for occasional bugs. Computer Games Strategy Plus criticized the "repetitive" crowd noises as "extremely underdone," writing that the crowd sounded as if "there are 10 people watching the round; you should feel like thousands are watching." However, the magazine considered the game nearly superior to the Links series.

GamePro considered the game better than Links LS 1999, but criticized the "iffy" artificial intelligence of the Jack Nicklaus opponent. The Mouse Meter also received some criticism, and some reviewers criticized the putting issue prior to the release of the patch. AllGame praised the sound effects, and GameSpot's Tim McDonald praised the game's club control, while Computer Gaming World praised the animation and realistic trajectory of the golf ball, as well as the "TV-style" camera angles.

As of September 1999, the game had sold only 15,000 copies, and it was reported four months later that Activision would try to sell the license. In January 2000, the Hartford Courant held its PC Sports Game of the Year poll, voted upon by Internet journalists. Jack Nicklaus 6 placed fourth on the list, which consisted of the 10 best sports games of 1999. As of February 2000, sales had totaled 20,000 copies, and that number rose to a measly 20,705 by April 2000. Because of the poor sales, Activision did not publish a sequel.

The game was nominated for Computer Gaming World's "Sports Game of the Year" award, which went to High Heat Baseball 2000.
