= Jack Nicklaus Golf & Course Design: Signature Edition =

1992 video game

- Developers: Sculptured Software (MS-DOS); Microsmiths, Inc (Genesis)
- Publisher: Accolade
- Series: Jack Nicklaus
- Platforms: MS-DOS, Sega Genesis
- Release: NA: March 31, 1992; (MS-DOS): NA/EU: July 1993; (Genesis)
- Genre: Sports
- Modes: Single-player, multiplayer

Jack Nicklaus Golf & Course Design: Signature Edition is a 1992 golf video game developed by Sculptured Software and published by Accolade for MS-DOS. It is part of a series of games named after golfer Jack Nicklaus, and follows Jack Nicklaus' Unlimited Golf & Course Design (1990). Like its predecessor, the game includes a golf course designer that allows the player to create customized courses. Two add-on disks provide additional courses. In 1995, both disks were re-released along with Signature Edition as a compilation titled Jack Nicklaus: The Tour Collection.

Jack Nicklaus' Power Challenge Golf, a scaled-down version of Signature Edition that lacks a course designer, was released for the Sega Genesis in July 1993. Both versions were praised for their graphics. The game was followed by Jack Nicklaus 4 (1997).

== Gameplay ==
Jack Nicklaus Golf & Course Design: Signature Edition includes strokes and skins, as well as three difficulty levels. Like its predecessor, the game also includes a golf course editor, allowing the player to create customized courses. The game features two real-life golf courses, English Turn and Sherwood Country Club, and courses created with Jack Nicklaus' Unlimited Golf & Course Design can be imported into Signature Edition. Player-created objects such as trees and sheds can also be imported into the game, if they have the .lbm or .pcx file extension. The game supports multiplayer for up to four players. Courses created with Signature Edition are compatible with the game's sequel, Jack Nicklaus 4.

Jack Nicklaus' Power Challenge Golf is a scaled-down version of Jack Nicklaus Golf & Course Design: Signature Edition for the Sega Genesis. It excludes the course designer feature, but includes English Turn and Sherwood Country Club, as well as Baltusrol, the site of the 1993 U.S. Open. The courses include adjustable wind conditions. Game modes include Stroke, Skins, Tournament Play, Driving Range and Putting Green, and CPU players include Jack Nicklaus. The player can edit the golfers' shot tendencies, skill levels, accuracy and distance percentages, and swing animations. Nicklaus is the sole golfer who cannot be edited. The game has a multiplayer option for up to four human players, who must take turns during gameplay.

== Development and release ==
Following Access Software's introduction of the Links series, the Jack Nicklaus series lost a significant number of players, prompting Accolade to release a new game with improved graphics and additional course designer options. The swing meter was also made horizontal to allow for a larger view of the screen and golf course. The game's English Turn and Sherwood Country Club were designed by Nicklaus in real life. The game was designed by Ned Martin and Sculptured Software, and published by Accolade.

Jack Nicklaus Golf & Course Design: Signature Edition was released on March 31, 1992, ahead of the 1992 Masters Tournament. The game was released for MS-DOS, and came with a code wheel for copy protection. Following the release, Accolade renewed its agreement with Jack Nicklaus to continue producing golf games with his name into the mid-1990s.

In 1992, Accolade began offering online golf tournaments in the game through Prodigy. Tournament courses were also downloadable. As of January 1993, 2,500 Signature Edition players had signed up for Prodigy's service. As of 1994, the game had thousands of online Prodigy players around the world.

Because of competition, an add-on course disk, Jack Nicklaus Signature Tour Vol. 1, was released in September 1992. The disk features Muirfield (Scotland) and Muirfield Village (Ohio). It was followed by Jack Nicklaus Signature Tour Vol. 2. In 1995, both disks were re-released along with Signature Edition as a compilation titled Jack Nicklaus: The Tour Collection.

Using the game's course designer, players created and released hundreds of Signature Edition courses online in the years leading up to Jack Nicklaus 4's release in 1997, and these courses were still regularly being exchanged between players.

=== Genesis version ===
For the Genesis version, Accolade and Jack Nicklaus' staff worked together on the game's initial design, and Nicklaus gave final approval of the project, including the instruction manual and packaging. The game includes digitized images depicting backgrounds and Nicklaus. Accolade published the Genesis version, which was designed and programmed by C. Heath of Microsmiths, Inc., and produced by Pam Levins. Jack Nicklaus' Power Challenge Golf was released in the United States and Europe in July 1993.

== Reception ==
Reception

Review scores
Publication	Score	
Publication	PC	Sega Genesis
Boston Herald	5/5 (main game and Vol. 1 disk)	
Electronic Games		87%
Los Angeles Times	4/5	
PC Review	6/10	
Sega Power		3/5
The Washington Post		9/10

The graphics for the MS-DOS version were mostly praised, although The Arizona Republic stated that the game "suffers from amateurish graphics". H.E. Dille of Computer Gaming World called the game a "solid offering", but stated that owners of Jack Nicklaus' Unlimited Golf & Course Design may question whether the new game would be worth the cost as it "doesn't break much new ground." Dennis Lynch of the Chicago Tribune called it "a sumptuous golf simulation with a nice touch that most of its competitors lack," praising the ability to create custom holes and courses.

Paul Presley of PC Review praised the course designer and the sounds, but criticized the game's putting. The Atlanta Constitution criticized the sluggish times required to reanimate the screen after each shot, and also mentioned limited golfing options. Los Angeles Times considered the game a "great improvement" over the previous Nicklaus games, praising the course designer and stating that the screen reanimates faster than in the Links games.

The Genesis version was also praised. Lynch called it "easily the best golf simulation for Genesis," praising the graphics, the golf shot variety, and the digitized sounds. Chip and Jonathan Carter of The Washington Post praised the game for its realism, including the "accurately re-created" courses, while Electronic Games praised the graphics and sound. GamePro praised the digitized images but otherwise considered the graphics to be average, while mentioning slow reanimation times. Sega Power praised the graphics and various options, but considered the game boring unless playing with another person.
