= Jack Nicklaus' Greatest 18 Holes of Major Championship Golf =

1988 video game

- C64 cover art
- Developers: Sculptured Software; Beam Software (TG16)
- Publishers: Accolade; Konami (NES); Tradewest (Game Boy); Victor Entertainment (X68000, MSX2)
- Producer: Keith Orr
- Designer: Ned Martin
- Composers: Paul Webb (Game Boy); Advance Communication Company (TG16)
- Series: Jack Nicklaus
- Platform: List: Amiga Amstrad CPC Apple IIGS Atari ST Commodore 64 Game Boy MS-DOS Classic Mac OS MSX NES PC-88 X68000 TurboGrafx-16/PC Engine
- Release: NA: 1988; (initial release) Other versions: Game Boy; NA: May 1992 NES; NA: March 1990; UK: August 1991 TurboGrafx-16/PC Engine 1990/1991
- Genre: Sports (golf)
- Modes: Single-player, multiplayer

Jack Nicklaus' Greatest 18 Holes of Major Championship Golf is a golfsimulation video game developed by Sculptured Software, and published by Accolade beginning in 1988. It was released for the Amiga, Amstrad CPC, Apple IIGS, Atari ST, Commodore 64, MS-DOS, Classic Mac OS, MSX, Nintendo Entertainment System, PC-88, X68000, and Game Boy.

During 1990 and 1991, the game was released in HuCard cartridge and CD-ROM formats for the U.S TurboGrafx-16 and its foreign counterpart, PC Engine. The TurboGrafx-16 versions of the game were titled Jack Nicklaus' Turbo Golf, while the PC Engine version was titled Jack Nicklaus World Golf Tour for the CD-ROM format. The Game Boy version was released as Jack Nicklaus Golf in 1992.

It was the first in a series of golf games named after golfer Jack Nicklaus, and was followed by Jack Nicklaus' Unlimited Golf & Course Design (1990).

== Gameplay ==
The game features Jack Nicklaus' favorite 18 golf holes, all put together in a single course, which includes holes from Augusta National Golf Club, Muirfield, Pebble Beach Golf Links, Royal Lytham & St Annes Golf Club, and Old Course at St Andrews. Two courses designed by Nicklaus are also featured in the game: Castle Pines (Colorado) and Desert Mountain (Arizona). Additionally, the Game Boy version includes Muirfield Village as a course. Several add-on disks were released for the computer versions to add additional courses.

The game features two game modes: Stroke Play and Skins. A multiplayer option allows for a maximum total of four players being able to play. The player can also compete against a selection of eight different CPU players that includes Jack Nicklaus. An image of Nicklaus also appears in between holes as he gives tips to the player.

Jack Nicklaus' Turbo Golf, for the TurboGrafx-16, differs from the other versions. In CD-ROM format, the game has five courses, including Castle Pines. The other courses were previously featured in the game's early add-on disks: The Australian Golf Club, Royal Troon Golf Club, Kemper Lakes Golf Club, and St. Creek Golf Club. The CD-ROM version allows the player to take a 360-degree look around any of the courses, and Nicklaus appears in between courses to give advice about each hole. The HuCard cartridge version of Jack Nicklaus' Turbo Golf includes only one course, The Australian Golf Club, and includes eight golfer rivals, as well as Jack Nicklaus.

== Release ==
Accolade began publishing Jack Nicklaus' Greatest 18 Holes of Major Championship Golf in 1988. It had the longest title of any software product at the time of its release. By August 1989, versions had been released in the United Kingdom for the Commodore 64 and PC, while versions for the Amiga, Amstrad CPC, and Atari ST were scheduled for release that autumn. An Apple IIGS version had been released by late 1989. As of 1990, a Classic Mac OS version had been published by Accolade. The NES version, published by Konami, was released in the United States in March 1990, while a United Kingdom release came in August 1991. Versions were also released for the MSX, PC-88, and X68000.

For the U.S. TurboGrafx-16, the game was released as Jack Nicklaus' Turbo Golf, in HuCard and CD-ROM formats. The game was also released for the TurboGrafx-16's foreign counterpart, the PC Engine. In the CD-ROM format, the PC Engine version was published under the title Jack Nicklaus' World Golf Tour, while the game in HuCard format retained the original Jack Nicklaus' Greatest 18 Holes of Major Championship Golf title. Jack Nicklaus' Turbo Golf and its foreign counterparts were released in 1990 and 1991.

The Game Boy version, Jack Nicklaus Golf, was released in the United States in May 1992; it was published by Tradewest, along with an unrelated game with the same title for the Super NES.

== Reception ==
Computer reviews

Review scores
Publication	Score
ACE	890/1000 (Amiga); 870/1000 (PC); 882/1000 (C64)
Amstrad Action	89% (CPC)
Amiga Action	60%
Amiga Format	78%
Commodore Format	80% (C64)
CU Amiga-64	84% (Amiga)
The Games Machine	60% (Amiga); 59% (ST); 62% (C64); 46% (CPC); 79% (PC)
inCider	5/5 (Apple IIgs)
.info	4/5 (C64); 4.5/5 (Amiga)
The One	83% (PC)
Zero	90/100 (Amiga/ST/PC)
Zzap!64	55% (C64)

=== Computer versions ===
The computer versions of the game received criticism for the slow load times in generating each new screen. Some criticized the computer version for including an off-disc copy protection scheme, which was deemed as difficult to use. Some critics favorably compared the game with the Leader Board golfing game series. Some praise was given for the graphics of the Amiga, Amstrad CPC, and Commodore 64 versions.

Amstrad Action called the CPC version, "Beyond a shadow of a doubt the best golf sim ever on a CPC." However, the magazine also wrote that the game would "only immediately appeal" to golf fans and people who have played computer golf games, while stating, "These limitations will unfairly cripple the game's popularity – a crime, because it's an entertaining and well-programmed sports sim." CU Amiga-64 praised the Amiga version's gameplay but was critical of the minimal sounds, the putting, and the "agonisingly slow" computer golfer opponent. Zzap!64 reviewed the Commodore 64 version and criticized the sound effects, as well as the blocky scenery and its unusual color schemes. The Games Machine, reviewing the CPC and ST versions, criticized the blocky scenery and its murky colors, as well as simple sound effects and poorly animated golfer sprites. Reviewing the Amiga version, the magazine praised the digitized image of Jack Nicklaus that appears in between holes, but criticized the rest of the graphics.

Tom Malcom of .info reviewed the Commodore 64 version; he called the graphics adequate and the sound "abominable," and concluded that the game, overall, was a good choice. Malcom subsequently reviewed the Amiga version; he praised the gameplay but felt the graphics were "not what they could, and should, be." He also wished there had been an option to turn off Jack Nicklaus' advice before each hole, stating that it slowed down the gameplay considerably.

Bob Wade of Amiga Format praised the sound. Tony Hetherington of Your Amiga criticized bad putting controls. He called the game "perfectly playable and competently programmed," but still considered it bland. Amiga Action praised the game and recommended it, but considered Leader Board to be superior. Amiga User International recommended the game for people who had not already purchased Mean 18, a similar golf game also by Accolade.

Dan Muse of inCider praised the Apple IIgs version as "a new standard in computer golf games" and "the best sports game, period." Regarding the image of Nicklaus that appears in between holes, Muse wrote, "Okay, it's a little corny, but I like it." Michael Dashe of Macworld praised the Macintosh version for its graphics, realistic gameplay, and variety of courses.

Mike Siggins reviewed Jack Nicklaus' Greatest 18 Holes of Major Championship Golf for Games International magazine, and gave it 4 stars out of 5, and stated that "In the end, this is an excellent game that is badly let down by one feature: the painfully slow screen updates."

Mike Siggins reviewed Jack Nicklaus Golf – Additional Courses Vol II for Games International magazine, and gave it a rating of 7 out of 10, and stated that "It is good to see Accolade supporting the program with these high quality course disks but their assumption seems to be that there is nothing wrong with the product. This I find hard to understand and would suggest, unless you aren't bothered by round of computer golf taking a couple of hours, that you don't bother buying any more add-on disks until the problem is attended to."

=== Other versions ===
Other versions

Review scores
Publication	Score
Chicago Sun-Times	9/10
Mean Machines	48% (NES)
Raze	76/100 (NES)

The NES and TurboGrafx-16 versions were also criticized for slow reanimation. Raze reviewed the NES version and stated that because of its easy gameplay, it was more fun to play it with other people rather than alone. Mean Machines criticized the NES version for its blocky scenery, stating that it hampered gameplay. The magazine also criticized the golfer sprite, the "average" sound effects, and the lack of music, and concluded that it was a "very tedious golf sim, which only die-hard fans of the genre should take a chance on." The Chicago Sun-Times, reviewing one of the game's versions, wrote, "Great for golfing enthusiasts and good for those who are new to golf."

Chip and Jonathan Carter, writing for the Philadelphia Daily News, reviewed the TurboGrafx-16 cartridge version and stated that additional courses would have been nice, although they praised the gameplay and graphics. GamePro reviewed the TurboGrafx-16 CD-ROM version and recommended the game for golf fans, but criticized the slow reanimation and stated that the game did not offer much to distinguish it from other golf games.

== See also ==
- Arnold Palmer Tournament Golf
