= Jack Nicklaus' Unlimited Golf & Course Design =

1990 video game

- Cover art (MS-DOS version)
- Developer: Sculptured Software
- Publishers: Accolade (computer versions); Tradewest (Super NES); Action Sixteen (1994 Amiga re-release)
- Series: Jack Nicklaus
- Platforms: Amiga, MS-DOS, Super NES
- Release: NA: June 1990; (computer versions): NA: May 1992; (Super NES)
- Genre: Sports
- Mode: Single-player

Jack Nicklaus' Unlimited Golf & Course Design is a 1990 golf video game developed by Sculptured Software and published by Accolade for the Amiga and MS-DOS. A Super NES version with the same golf courses, titled Jack Nicklaus Golf, was released in May 1992. It is the second in a series of golf games named after golfer Jack Nicklaus, following Jack Nicklaus' Greatest 18 Holes of Major Championship Golf (1988).

The game includes a golf course designer that allows the player to create customized courses. The computer version was praised for its graphics and course designer, although reviewers criticized the long reanimation times in each version of the game. It was followed by Jack Nicklaus Golf & Course Design: Signature Edition (1992).

== Gameplay ==
The game includes the real-life Muirfield Village and the fictional game-only course "The Bear's Track," both designed by Nicklaus. Unlike its predecessor, the game also includes a golf course designer, allowing the player to create a customized course. Three vacant plots exist for the player to create custom courses, and the two existing courses can also be edited. In designing courses, the player can choose between three types: mountainside, parkside, and seaside. The course designer features various options, including hills, valleys, trees, and lakes. The player can also create custom backgrounds for the courses. Several add-on disks, released for the game and its predecessor, can be used to add additional golf courses. Courses created with Jack Nicklaus' Unlimited Golf & Course Design can be imported into the subsequent game, Jack Nicklaus Golf & Course Design: Signature Edition.

Game modes include skins and stroke, and the player can choose to rewind a poor golf shot and try it again. The golfer is viewed from a third-person perspective, and each hole starts with an overhead angle above the course which allows the player to view the distance to the hole. The game informs the player of the distance to the hole, and offers a selection of golf clubs. A power bar along the left side of the screen controls the shot. Jack Nicklaus appears in the game to give advice to the player before each hole, and the game provides an option to view each shot through a reverse-angle replay. The Super NES version features the same courses and a course designer. It also includes a password feature, and a replay option with various angles.

== Release ==
Jack Nicklaus' Unlimited Golf & Course Design was released in the United States in June 1990, for the Amiga and MS-DOS. Jack Nicklaus was involved in the game's design. The game was accompanied by a 224-page guide book, The Official Guide to Jack Nicklaus Computer Golf, which gives advice on course design. The book was published by Compute Publications and written by Mark Harrison, with a foreword by Nicklaus.

The Super NES version, titled Jack Nicklaus Golf, was released in the United States in May 1992. It was published by Tradewest, along with an unrelated Game Boy version also titled Jack Nicklaus Golf. The Amiga version received a budget re-release in 1994, published by Action Sixteen.

== Reception ==
Reception

Review scores
Publication	Score	
Publication	PC	SNES
Electronic Gaming Monthly		5/10
Amiga Action	60% (1994)	
Amiga Format	78% (1994)	
Amiga Power	65% (1994)	
CU Amiga	61% (1994)	
.info	4.5/5	
N-Force		77%
The One Amiga	67% (1994)	
Super Play		62%
Zero	91/100	

The computer version received praise for its graphics and course designer. Jeff Prosise of PC Magazine considered it to be "the best, most realistic golf simulation on the market", and praised the sound and various game options. PC Magazine's Jonathan Matzkin ranked it among the magazine's compilation of the best games of 1990. Amazing Computing considered the game superior to its 1988 predecessor, praising the "nicer" graphics and stating that they load faster than the previous game, although others criticized the slow reanimation. Albert Kim of Sports Illustrated considered the game entertaining and praised the course designer, but stated that the designer took some time to master, with the instruction manual being 156 pages long. Boston Herald called it "one of the best computer golf games available," and praised its add-on course disks. Michael J. Himowitz of The Baltimore Evening Sun praised the gameplay, realistic courses, and various camera angles. Tom Malcom of .info considered it to be the best golf game available up to that time.

The Super NES version was also criticized for slow reanimation; Jonathan Davies of Super Play stated that because the "nice" graphics take so long to animate, the game was "virtually unplayable." N-Force praised the digitized graphics and the replay options of the Super NES version, but stated that the game needed more holes, while reviewers for Electronic Gaming Monthly considered the game to be average.

Several critics reviewed the game's Amiga re-release. Amiga Action considered the graphics to be average and stated that it was "far too easy to mess a shot up." The magazine further wrote that the game possibly had the thickest instruction manual ever for a golfing game, with more than half of it devoted to the course designer, and stated that designing courses would be fun, but "the long wait for the whole thing to activate isn't worth it." Jonathan Davies, then writing for Amiga Power, stated that the course designer "works undeniably well," but that it would only appeal to hardcore golfers. Davies considered PGA Tour and Nick Faldo's Championship Golf to be superior games. Tony Dillon of CU Amiga criticized the graphics for being blocky, simple, and repetitive. Dillon also criticized the gameplay, writing that it alternated between too easy and too difficult. The One Amiga praised the game's graphics and various options, including the course designer, but criticized the sluggish controls and inconsistent shot accuracy.
