= Jack Nicklaus (series) =

Series of golf video games

- Genre: Sports
- Developers: Sculptured Software; Tradewest; Microsmiths, Inc.; Cinematronics; Eclipse Entertainment; Hypnos Entertainment; Perfect Parallel
- Publishers: Accolade (primary publisher; 1988–98); Konami; Tradewest; MacSoft; Activision; Perfect Parallel
- Platforms: Amiga; Amstrad CPC; Apple IIGS; Atari ST; Commodore 64; MS-DOS; Macintosh; MSX; NES; PC-88; X68000; TurboGrafx-16; PC Engine; Super NES; Genesis; Windows; DVD
- First release: Jack Nicklaus' Greatest 18 Holes of Major Championship Golf; 1988
- Latest release: Jack Nicklaus Perfect Golf; May 3, 2016

Jack Nicklaus is a series of golf video games named after golfer Jack Nicklaus. The first game, Jack Nicklaus' Greatest 18 Holes of Major Championship Golf, was developed by Sculptured Software and published by Accolade. It was released for various platforms beginning in 1988. Accolade would publish subsequent games in the series for the next decade, before selling the rights to Activision in 1998. Activision published a sixth game in the series, Jack Nicklaus 6: Golden Bear Challenge, in 1999, but chose not to publish a sequel due to poor sales. The next game in the series, Jack Nicklaus Perfect Golf, was released by a new company in 2016.

== Games ==
=== Jack Nicklaus' Greatest 18 Holes of Major Championship Golf (1988) ===
Jack Nicklaus' Greatest 18 Holes of Major Championship Golf was developed by Sculptured Software and published by Accolade for various platforms beginning in 1988. It was released for Amiga, Amstrad CPC, Apple IIGS, Atari ST, Commodore 64, MS-DOS, Classic Mac OS, MSX, Nintendo Entertainment System, PC-88, X68000, and TurboGrafx-16. A Game Boy version, titled Jack Nicklaus Golf, was released in 1992; it was published by Tradewest, which also released an unrelated game with the same title for the Super NES.

The game features Jack Nicklaus' favorite 18 golf holes, all put together in a single course, which includes holes from Augusta National Golf Club, Muirfield, Pebble Beach Golf Links, Royal Lytham & St Annes Golf Club, and Old Course at St Andrews. Two courses designed by Nicklaus are also featured in the game: Castle Pines (Colorado) and Desert Mountain (Arizona). Additionally, the Game Boy version includes Muirfield Village as a course.

=== Add-on disks ===
Between 1989 and 1991, several add-on computer disks were released for Jack Nicklaus' Greatest 18 Holes of Major Championship Golf and Jack Nicklaus' Unlimited Golf & Course Design, adding additional golf courses and features. The disks are compatible with both games.

- Jack Nicklaus Presents the Major Championship Courses of 1989 adds courses from major 1989 golf championships: Oak Hill Country Club (1989 U.S. Open), Royal Troon Golf Club (1989 Open Championship), and Kemper Lakes Golf Club (1989 PGA Championship). Compute! praised the courses for their realistic difficulty, and Paul Statt of inCider rated the disk 4 out of 5.
- Jack Nicklaus Presents the International Course Disk (1990) adds three courses designed by Nicklaus: The Australian Golf Club, St. Creek Golf Club (Japan), and St. Mellion Golf & Country Club.
- Jack Nicklaus Presents the Major Championship Courses of 1990 adds Medinah Country Club (1990 U.S. Open), Old Course at St Andrews (1990 Open Championship), and Shoal Creek Club (1990 PGA Championship).
- Jack Nicklaus Presents the Great Courses of the U.S. Open (1991) adds Pebble Beach Golf Links, Oakmont Country Club, and Baltusrol Golf Club, all of which had previously hosted U.S. Open championships.
- Jack Nicklaus Presents the Major Championship Courses of 1991 adds Royal Birkdale Golf Club (1991 Open Championship), Hazeltine National Golf Club (1991 U.S. Open), and Crooked Stick Golf Club (1991 PGA Championship). Alan Dykes of CU Amiga rated the disk 78 percent and stated that it added nothing new aside from the courses. He criticized the game's copy protection and its slow reanimation. Computist rated it three stars out of five.
- Jack Nicklaus' Course Designers Clip Art Volume 1 (1991) was released as an add-on disk for Jack Nicklaus' Unlimited Golf & Course Design with various features. The disk includes a new course, Desert Highlands (Arizona), and allows the player to add three new environments to custom golf courses, including a desert atmosphere. The disk includes nine new backgrounds and more than 70 objects, such as trees, rocks, animals, fountains, and golf carts. Computist rated it three stars out of five.

=== Jack Nicklaus' Unlimited Golf & Course Design (1990) ===
Jack Nicklaus' Unlimited Golf & Course Design was developed by Sculptured Software and published by Accolade in June 1990, for the Amiga and MS-DOS. The game includes the real-life Muirfield Village and the fictional game-only course "The Bear's Track," both designed by Nicklaus. The game also includes a golf course designer, allowing the player to create a customized course. A Super NES version with the same golf courses, titled Jack Nicklaus Golf, was released in May 1992.

=== Jack Nicklaus Golf & Course Design: Signature Edition (1992) ===
Jack Nicklaus Golf & Course Design: Signature Edition was developed by Sculptured Software and published by Accolade on March 31, 1992, for MS-DOS. Following Access Software's introduction of the Links series, the Jack Nicklaus series lost a significant number of players, prompting Accolade to release a new game with improved graphics and additional course designer options. Accolade advertised it as the third game in the series. Following the game's release, Accolade renewed its agreement with Jack Nicklaus to continue producing golf games with his name into the mid-1990s. The game includes strokes and skin, as well as three difficulty levels. The game features two golf courses, English Turn and Sherwood Country Club, and courses created with Jack Nicklaus' Unlimited Golf & Course Design can be imported into Signature Edition. The game offered online tournaments through Prodigy.

Jack Nicklaus' Power Challenge Golf, a scaled-down version of Jack Nicklaus Golf & Course Design: Signature Edition, was released for the Sega Genesis in 1993. It excludes the course designer feature, but includes English Turn and Sherwood Country Club, as well as Baltusrol Golf Club. Two add-on disks, Jack Nicklaus Signature Tour Vol. 1 and Jack Nicklaus Signature Tour Vol. 2, provide additional courses for the MS-DOS version. In 1995, both disks were re-released along with Signature Edition as a compilation titled Jack Nicklaus: The Tour Collection.

=== Jack Nicklaus' Power Challenge Golf (1993) ===
Jack Nicklaus' Power Challenge Golf was developed by Microsmiths Inc. and published by Accolade in 1993, for the Sega Genesis.

=== Cancelled games (1990s) ===
Jack Nicklaus Golf–CDTV was announced by Accolade in June 1991, during the Summer Consumer Electronics Show. It was to be released for the Commodore CDTV during the third quarter of 1991. The game would have featured Muirfield Village, created from over 9,000 digitized images taken of the course. The process required a group of more than 30 photographers and technicians, and the photographs, taken from all angles, would be rendered in 4,096 colors. The player would be able to choose from five golf partners, including Jack Nicklaus, who could also be an opponent. Nicklaus would be featured through digitized imaging. Chris Bankston was the game's producer. As of June 1992, there were still plans to release the game on the CDTV.

In June 1994, Atari announced during the Consumer Electronics Show that the game would be released on its new Atari Jaguar CD, under the title Jack Nicklaus Cyber Golf. The game would now include full motion video of Nicklaus and other golfers, and would feature commentary from David Livingstone, who would also provide advice to the player. The game was expected to be released in 1995, but was ultimately scrapped for being unacceptable. A prototype of the game, in Jaguar cartridge format, had become available by 2019. It features a few basic menu screens and limited music, as well as a single playable hole of golf.

=== Jack Nicklaus 4 (1997) ===
Jack Nicklaus 4 was developed by Cinematronics and published by Accolade in March 1997, for Microsoft Windows. Development was underway as of January 1995, and the game was developed for Microsoft Windows due to the operating system's increased prevalence. Macintosh and DVD versions were also released. A PlayStation version, titled Jack Nicklaus '98 and featuring the same courses as Jack Nicklaus 4, had been scheduled for release in late 1997, although it was never released.

Jack Nicklaus 4 includes eight different game modes and a course designer. The game features five 18-hole courses, including four real-life courses: Muirfield Village, Colleton River Plantation, Country Club of the South and Cabo del Sol. The fifth course is Winding Springs, a fictional location created by the developers using the game's course designer. The game includes the ability to import and convert online user-created golf courses from Jack Nicklaus Golf & Course Design: Signature Edition, and courses created in Jack Nicklaus 4 are compatible with the game's sequel, Jack Nicklaus 5. Jack Nicklaus 4 received positive reviews, but sold poorly.

==== Jack Nicklaus Online Golf Tour (1998) ====
Jack Nicklaus Online Golf Tour was developed by Hypnos Entertainment, and was released online in 1998. The game, originally titled Jack Nicklaus 4 Online, was announced in December 1996. Accolade unveiled a partnership with Aries Online Games, owned by Kesmai, to publish the game as an online multiplayer version of Accolade's then-upcoming computer game, Jack Nicklaus 4. The game would differ from the retail version as it would feature online tournaments. The game was originally expected to be released by mid-1997. It would be the first tournament-based golf game played across the Internet, and Accolade stated that over 1,000 people would be able to play the game simultaneously. A beta tournament had been scheduled for July 1997, but did not occur as expected. The game was later planned for release in November 1997, alongside Jack Nicklaus 5.

Ultimately, the game was launched on Kesmai's GameStorm website in April 1998. It was based on the Jack Nicklaus 4 game engine, and online courses created with Jack Nicklaus 4 were playable through Jack Nicklaus Online Golf Tour. The game featured more than 100 downloadable courses for players to compete on, and featured an option to play foursomes. Accolade remained involved in the game, despite selling the series rights to Accolade that year. At the time of its release, Stephen Poole of GameSpot praised the game as "the fastest and smoothest golf action on the Internet, along with a wonderful community of friendly players." However, he stated it would be nice if GameStorm offered prizes for the game, "even if they're just a putter or tickets to a PGA event." The game was released on AOL's Games Channel in November 1998.

Tournaments included:

- Global Internet Golf Invitational, held in July 1998 and played on the game's Muirfield Village course.
- Jack Nicklaus Spring Golf Tour, held in April 1999 as a collaboration between Kesmai, AOL, and CBS SportsLine.
- 1999 Jack Nicklaus Online Golf Championship, presented by Comfort Inn, which jointly developed it with GameStorm and Jack Nicklaus Productions. The championship was expected to take place over two months, beginning in November 1999. It would be set across four of the game's courses. It was the largest Internet golf tournament, with more than 11,000 players signing up for it.
- NFL Players Online Golf Challenge, a three-day tournament held in January 2000, with 11 teams competing for NFL-related prizes, including tickets to a real golf tournament played by active NFL players. The online tournament was jointly created by Kesmai and the NFL Players Golf Club.

=== Jack Nicklaus 5 (1997) ===
Jack Nicklaus 5 was developed by Eclipse Entertainment and published by Accolade in November 1997, for Windows 95. Eclipse's development team included members of the Cinematronics team that worked on Jack Nicklaus 4. Jack Nicklaus 5 has several gameplay modes, including a tournament mode. It also includes a course designer. Unlike previous games, the course designer in Jack Nicklaus 5 allows players to import customized graphics and sound effects. The course designer was also backwards compatible with Jack Nicklaus 4 courses. The game features 10 courses, each with 18 holes. Five of the courses are from the previous game, while new real-life courses include Hualalai Resort Golf Club (Hawaii), South Shore Golf Club (Lake Las Vegas), and Mount Juliet Golf Course (Ireland). The game's two other courses are original designs created with the course designer. Five of the real-life courses featured in the game were designed by Nicklaus. Like its predecessor, Jack Nicklaus 5 received positive reviews but sold poorly. It was the last Jack Nicklaus game published by Accolade, which, after 10 years, sold the rights to Activision in April 1998, to focus primarily on action games.

=== Jack Nicklaus 6: Golden Bear Challenge (1999) ===
Jack Nicklaus 6: Golden Bear Challenge was developed by Hypnos Entertainment and published by Activision in March 1999, for Microsoft Windows. Mike Franco, who produced Jack Nicklaus 4 and Jack Nicklaus 5, began working on a new game in the series in November 1997, when the latter game was released. After Activision purchased the series rights in April 1998, the company hired Hypnos Entertainment to develop the series' next game. Hypnos Entertainment was made up of team members who worked on earlier Jack Nicklaus games, including Jack Nicklaus Online Golf Tour. Full work on the new game began in April 1998, after the sale was complete and after Franco joined Hypnos Entertainment. Jack Nicklaus 6: Golden Bear Challenge received mostly positive reviews, with an 86 percent rating on GameRankings. However, the game sold poorly, prompting Activision not to publish a sequel.

The game's title is a reference to Nicklaus' nickname, "Golden Bear." It is the first game in the series that allows the player to play as Jack Nicklaus. The game features six golf courses, all recreations of real courses: Shoal Creek, Muirfield Village, Montecastillo, Sherwood Country Club, Cochise at Desert Mountain, and Nicklaus North in Whistler, British Columbia. In addition to the game's six golf courses, nearly 300 compatible courses from the previous game were also available online when Jack Nicklaus 6 was released. The golf courses featured in the game were designed by Nicklaus in real life. The game also includes a golf course designer.

=== Jack Nicklaus Perfect Golf (2016) ===
Jack Nicklaus Perfect Golf was developed by Perfect Parallel, and was released for Linux, macOS and Microsoft Windows through Steam in 2016. Perfect Parallel was primarily a golf services company, and it previously released the game as Perfect Golf in January 2015, through Early Access on Steam, before releasing Jack Nicklaus Perfect Golf on Steam on May 3, 2016. Jack Nicklaus Perfect Golf featured 12 courses upon its release, including the real Bethesda Country Club in Bethesda, Maryland. The game features 20 game modes, including match, skins, stroke, better ball, foursome, and scramble. The game also includes a multiplayer option. At the time of its release, there were plans to eventually allow players to create their own modes, which could also be shared with others.

Polygon described the game's 2016 release as "a strangely low-key launch" considering it was "a sports title with such a big name attached to it." A course of Jack Nicklaus' Muirfield Village was released for the game in June 2016. Other real-life courses had been created by the company and were expected to be added into the game later in the year. The company expected to release the game for Xbox One by the end of 2016, and discussions were also held about releasing it for PlayStation 4. However, as of 2025, the game was not released on Xbox or Playstation, while the Steam version has been renamed as simply Perfect Golf, presumably for licensing reasons.

== See also ==
- PGA Tour (video game series)
- Everybody's Golf
