= Jack Nicklaus 5 =

1997 video game

- Developer: Eclipse Entertainment
- Publisher: Accolade
- Series: Jack Nicklaus
- Platform: Windows 95
- Release: NA: November 24, 1997
- Genre: Sports video game
- Modes: Single-player, multiplayer

Jack Nicklaus 5 is a golf video game developed by American studio Eclipse Entertainment and published by Accolade for Windows 95. It is part of a series of golfing games named after golfer Jack Nicklaus. It was released in November 1997, shortly after its predecessor, Jack Nicklaus 4 (1997). Jack Nicklaus 5 received positive reviews for its graphics, sound, and a golf course designer feature, but the game sold poorly. It was followed by Jack Nicklaus 6: Golden Bear Challenge in 1999.

== Gameplay ==
Jack Nicklaus 5 has several gameplay modes, including a tournament mode. The player can choose between male and female characters to play as, and can also choose between left- and right-handed options. The player can compete against computer-controlled players, both male and female, including Jack Nicklaus. Three difficulty levels and various camera angles are offered. The player has three options in choosing how to swing the club, including two traditional options requiring two and three clicks respectively. The third option, MouseMeter, involves the player moving the mouse while the club moves simultaneously. The player can change conditions on a course to include fog and five different wind conditions. The game also includes a multiplayer option. Gary McCord provides commentary throughout the game.

As with previous games in the series, Jack Nicklaus 5 includes a course designer which allows the player to create a custom golf course. Unlike previous games, the course designer in Jack Nicklaus 5 allows players to import customized graphics and sound effects. The course designer was backwards compatible with Jack Nicklaus 4 courses. The game features 10 courses, each with 18 holes. Five of the courses are from the previous game, while new real-life courses include Hualalai Resort Golf Club (Hawaii), South Shore Golf Club (Lake Las Vegas), and Mount Juliet Golf Course (Ireland). The game's two other courses are original designs created with the course designer. Several courses are available to the player immediately upon starting the game. At the time of release, players could also choose from more than 125 free golf courses available to download from the Internet. The downloadable courses were created by people from around the world, using the game's course designer.

== Development and release ==
Jack Nicklaus 5 was developed by Eclipse Entertainment and published by Accolade for Windows 95. It used a different game engine from its predecessor. Eclipse's development team included members of the Cinematronics, LLC team that worked on Jack Nicklaus 4. For the sequel, new features were added in response to user feedback. This included new textures in the course designer, and the ability to import PCX files as textures, objects, or backgrounds. Physics relating to golf balls were also improved from the previous game.

While the previous game featured two-dimensional full motion video golfers, Jack Nicklaus 5 utilized three-dimensional polygonal character models for more-realistic movements. The golfers were created through motion capture animation, and were made up of more than 2,000 polygons. Five of the real-life courses featured in the game were designed by Jack Nicklaus. The game's course designer was modeled after Nicklaus Productions' computer-aided design system.

Jack Nicklaus 5 was released in the United States in November 1997. It was the last Jack Nicklaus game published by Accolade, which, after 10 years, sold the rights to Activision in 1998. The game was advertised as having an online player matching service, NetAccolade, but this feature had yet to be released as of July 1998.

== Reception ==
Reception

Review scores
| Publication | Score |
|---|---|
| AllGame | 4/5 |
| Computer Games Magazine | 4.5/5 |
| Computer Gaming World | 5/5 |
| GameRevolution | B+ |
| GameSpot | 8.9/10 |
| PC PowerPlay | 89% |
| PC Zone | 92% |
| Detroit Free Press | 4/4 |
| The Electric Playground | 9.5/10 |
| The Oregonian | "Very good" |

Jack Nicklaus 5 received positive reviews, but sold poorly. Reviewers praised the graphics, the sounds, and the course designer, which Computer Gaming World considered to be the game's "biggest draw". Computer Games Magazine called the game a "must buy" on account of the course designer, writing, "This program could easily be sold separately at a price equal to the basic game, and it would be a deal at that." The magazine also called the game's golf physics "arguably the best of any golf game," writing, "Every bounce, every ricochet, every roll looks and feels right." Some reviewers criticized McCord's commentary as being repetitive and irritating after a while, and others noted that gameplay can become sluggish due to the amount of graphics depicted onscreen. Some reviewers also criticized the lack of the advertised player matching service, which was not ready at the time of the reviews' publication.

Michael L. House of AllGame called it "a quantum leap ahead" of its predecessor and wrote that its charm over other major golfing simulations "is the unlikelihood of consistently shooting unrealistic scores in the mid-to-upper 50's." House stated that the gameplay was not perfect, but that "it's difficult sometimes to find fault because of the sheer beauty of the graphics." One feature that House wrote to be "inexplicably left out by the designers is the inability to change course conditions to either wet or dry," although he noted the fog and wind options. House criticized the game's large instruction manual and in-game instructions for inadequately explaining the game, writing, "Many features are discovered through trial and error only and the manual contains references to some features that were not included in the final product."

Colin Gale of The Electric Playground called it a "solid, solid golf game" with "incredible" replay value due to its course designer and downloadable courses. However, Gale stated that more golfers would have been a nice feature, and also thought the announcer's commentary could have been better. The Atlanta Constitution wrote, "It's not real golf but if you're willing to suspend disbelief a little, it begins to feel like the real thing." Mark Cooke of Game Revolution considered the game to be as hard as real golf, which he believed "a lot of people aren't looking for" in a golfing video game. Cooke felt the game was too realistic and wrote, "You really have to practice, know which clubs to use, know how much to compensate your drives for the wind, and know how to putt."

Regarding its graphics and advanced shot setup, PC PowerPlay considered the game to be "just short" of Links LS 1998, but called Jack Nicklaus 5 a "viable golfing alternative" due to its "equally strong playability" and large number of courses. The Hartford Courant praised the game, but believed that the Links series had superior gameplay and graphics. In 1998, a group of 11 reviewers and editors, from the Hartford Courant and from computer gaming websites, ranked the top 10 sports games of 1997, placing Jack Nicklaus 5 in seventh place.
