= Polaris World =

Travel and holiday companies of Spain

Coordinates: 37.820904°N 1.006687°W

Polaris World was a holiday resort company centred on golf courses designed by Nicklaus Design - the golf course design and development firm set up by Jack Nicklaus and his sons. However, the company was established in 2001 by Pedro García Meroño and Facundo Armero. The resorts, which were expected to form a "golf trail" when completed, helped in the development of residential tourism in the Costa Calida region of Spain and were at one point the largest developer of holiday homes in the country.

Polaris World was the largest golf resort developer in Murcia. The seven Polaris World resorts range in size from 55 hectares up to 900 hectares, with most around the 100 to 150 hectare size. Among the notable properties that formed part of the brand were: Mar Menor, La Torre, and El Valle. Condado de Alhama is the largest development - over 900 hectares with a golf course. Condado De Alhama is situated close to (25 minutes drive) the new Murcia International Airport, Corvera Airport. Polaris World sold these properties in 2010 and filed for bankruptcy in 2017.

== Financial Status ==
Polaris World began to struggle due to the 2008 financial crisis and the Spanish property bubble, and extensive re-financing was needed in 2009. Their financing faced struggles as well, but they were able to avoid a 2010 bankruptcy. By 2012, sales prices had fallen extensively.
