= M. Anthony Burns =

American businessman

- Born: November 1, 1942 (age 83); Mesquite, Nevada, United States
- Education: Brigham Young University (BS); University of California, Berkeley (MBA)
- Occupations: American business executive and university trustee
- Known for: Former president and CEO of Ryder Systems
- Spouse: Joyce Jordan

M. Anthony Burns (born November 1, 1942) is an American businessman and chairman emeritus of the board of directors of Ryder, a United States-based provider of transportation and supply chain management products.

Burns is also managing owner and chairman of Red Ledges in Heber City, Utah, a corporate director at Pfizer and Huntsman Corporation, and a life trustee at the University of Miami.

== Early life and education ==
Burns was born on November 1, 1942, in Mesquite, Nevada. He attended Utah Tech University (then Dixie State College) in nearby St. George, Utah on a baseball scholarship and then transferred to Brigham Young University, where he received a B.S. in 1964. In 1965, he received an MBA in 1965 from the Haas School of Business.

== Career ==
Burns joined the Ryder finance organization in 1974, and in 1979 was elected Ryder's president and Chief Operating Officer. He was later elected Chief Executive Officer in January 1983 and chairman of the board of directors in May 1985. He retired from his position with Ryder System, Inc. in 2002. Throughout his tenure, Burns helped Ryder to grow from $500 million in revenue to more than $5 billion.

When Burns joined Ryder in 1974, the company primarily focused on truck leasing and rental, owning a fleet of about 50,000 vehicles and employing 13,000 workers in three countries. At Burns's retirement in 2002, Ryder had a fleet of more than 170,000 vehicles for commercial truck leasing and rental, had 30,000 employees in more than a dozen countries on four continents and had expanded into logistics.

Before joining Ryder, Burns was Comptroller for North America at Mobil.

He formerly served on the board of directors of JPMorgan Chase, Stanley Black & Decker and JCPenney and was chairman of the audit committee for all three. Burns also served as the director of the U.S. Chamber of Commerce and chairman of the Chamber's Services Industries Council.

Burns also served on the national boards of United Way of America, American Red Cross, National Urban League and Boy Scouts of America, as well as on the Board of the Directors of the Foundation for the Malcolm Baldrige National Quality Award. He is an honorary trustee and former chairman of the National Urban League. He also served as the co-chairman of The Business Roundtable and chairman of its Health and Retirement Task Force, as a member of the Business-Higher Education Forum, as a member of The Business Council, and on the Coca-Cola Company's task force on human resource issues.

In the South Florida community, Burns was chairman of the Capital Campaign for the Performing Arts Center of Greater Miami and formerly served as board chairman and campaign chairman of the United Way of Miami-Dade County and president of the South Florida Council of the Boy Scouts of America.

Burns has also served on the national advisory council of the School of Management of Brigham Young University, the board of visitors of the Graduate School of Business Administration of the University of North Carolina at Chapel Hill and the board of overseers of the Wharton School. He was an associate trustee of the University of Pennsylvania.

== Philanthropy and civic involvement ==
Burns has led many humanitarian, cultural, civic and industry endeavors throughout his career, especially in the Miami-Dade area of South Florida.

Burns was a member of the Non-Group, a civically influential group of Miami-Dade business elites.

Burns chaired the capital campaign for the Adrienne Arsht Center for the Performing Arts for 17 years, leading an effort that raised $415 million (including more than $1 million that he personally gave). While at Ryder, he oversaw donations for the construction of the Ryder Trauma Center at Jackson Memorial Hospital and the Ryder Center Arena (now the BankUnited Center) at the University of Miami, and he coordinated Ryder's sponsorship of the Doral Ryder Open for 16 years.

He also created scholarship funds at Utah Tech University in St. George, Utah, which to date have provided more than 100 scholarships, and has endowed four scholarships each at Wasatch High School in Heber City, Utah, and Virgin Valley High School in Mesquite, Nevada.

== Personal life ==
Burns is married to the former Joyce Jordan. They have three children and six grandchildren. He is a member of the Church of Jesus Christ of Latter-day Saints (LDS Church) and has served in leadership roles in the church including bishop and stake president. He recently served as an area seventy in the church's Sixth Quorum of the Seventy.

Burns was serving as an LDS Church bishop in Miami when Hurricane Andrew hit in 1992, destroying much of his neighborhood. With extensive destruction surrounding him, Burns went out to the front lines and joined the work crews in repairing roofs. He also made the lobby of Ryder's corporate headquarters available to United Way. Making many donations such as food and clothing to charitable agencies, Burns also provided Ryder's trucks to people who needed to transport themselves and possessions to safer, drier places. With his approval, Ryder also donated $2.5 million to rebuild the Miami-Dade County after Hurricane Andrew's destruction and allowed Ryder employees to work half days at the company and half days in the rescue effort. Burns was recognized as the American Red Cross Humanitarian of the Year for this work following Hurricane Andrew.

Several facilities, centers and other education resources at various institutions are named in honor of M. Anthony Burns in recognition of donations or other assistance during construction:

- The Burns Arena at Utah Tech University
- The Joyce and M. Anthony Burns Science Building at Fairchild Tropical Botanic Garden in Miami, Florida
- The Burns Green Room at the Adrienne Arsht Center for the Performing Arts in Miami, Florida
- The M. Anthony Burns Center for Advanced Supply Chain Management at the University of Miami
- The M. Anthony Burns/Ryder System Inc. Endowed Teaching Chair at Miami Dade College

== Awards ==
Humanitarian

Burns has been awarded the Jay W. Weiss Humanitarian Award by the Jackson Memorial Foundation, the Robert W. Laidlaw Humanitarian Award by the Epilepsy Foundation of South Florida, the Sand In My Shoes award by the Greater Miami Chamber of Commerce, and the Community Service Award by the Advertising Federation of Greater Miami.

Business

Burns was named CEO of the decade in Transportation: Freight & Leasing by Financial World and is a three-time recipient of CEO of the Year in Transportation: Freight & Leasing. He was also named the International Executive of the Year by the Marriott School of Management at Brigham Young University and Business Leader of the Century by Brigham Young University—Idaho.

Other awards Burns has received include:

Business

- South Florida Business Hall of Fame (Florida Council on Economic Education)
- Junior Achievement's Business Leadership Hall of Fame
- Business Leader of the Year (The Miami News)
- Joseph Wharton Business Statesman Award (Wharton School Club)
- Marketer of the Year (Academy of Marketing Science)
- Leslie Pantin, Sr. Leadership Award (Coalition of Hispanic American Women)

Education

- Honorary doctor of public service degree from Florida International University
- Honorary doctor of humane letters degree from Florida Memorial University (formerly Florida Memorial College)
- Haas School of Business Hall of Fame (University of California, Berkeley)
- Charter Member of the Utah Tech University Hall of Fame (Formerly Dixie State University)
- Outstanding Alumnus (American Association of Community Colleges)
- Wall of Fame (Mesquite, Nev.)
- Jesse Knight Industrial Citizenship Award (Brigham Young University)

Scouting

- Silver Buffalo Award (Boy Scouts of America)
- Silver Beaver (Boy Scouts of America)
- Good Scout Award (Boy Scouts of America)

Miscellaneous

- Silver Medallion (National Conference for Community and Justice - formerly National Conference of Christian and Jews)
- Americanism Award (Anti-Defamation League)
- Equal Opportunity Day Award (National Urban League)
- Robie Award for Achievement in Industry (Jackie Robinson Foundation)
- Boneh Yisroel (Builder of Israel) Award (Greater Miami Jewish Federation)
- Spirit of Excellence (The Miami Herald)
- Torchbearer, 2002 Olympic Winter Games
- Free Enterpriser of the Year (Florida Council on Economic Education)
