= Costa Cálida =

Stretch of coastline of Murcia, Spain

Coordinates: 37°33′51″N 1°13′10″W

Costa Cálida

The Costa Cálida (Spanish: [ˈkosta ˈkaliða], "Warm Coast") is the approximately 250 km stretch of Mediterranean coastline of the Spanish province of Murcia. This region has a micro-climate which features comparatively hot mean annual temperatures (and hence its name, "Warm Coast") and a quite notable degree of aridity (precipitation averaging less than 310 millimeters annually), scoring a semidesert category and in the southern parts even desert status in Koppen classification.

== Geography and location ==
The Costa Cálida extends from El Mojón in the north near the province of Alicante, to near the municipality of Águilas in the south bordering on the region of Almería province.

The northern end of this coastline includes the Mar Menor ("Lesser Sea"), a coastal saltwater lagoon which at around 170 km^{2} is Europe's largest. The Mar Menor is separated from the Mediterranean by a 22 km-long spit of land called La Manga, on which most of the tourism development for the region has been constructed.

Cartagena and Mazarrón are two other important coastal towns in the region.

Golf is a popular pastime for visitors and residents. There are many PGA championship courses such as Hacienda Riquelme Golf Resort which hosted the 2009 and 2010 Spanish Pro Golf Championship, El Valle which hosted the PGA European Seniors Tour in June 2011, Hacienda del Alamo which is the longest golf course in Spain and the famous La Manga Club, in Cartagena.

== In popular culture ==
- In the 1996 point-and-click adventure video game Broken Sword: The Shadow of the Templars, Costa Cálida is home to the Villa de Vasconcellos location.
