= List of golf courses designed by Jack Nicklaus =

This is a list of golf courses designed by Jack Nicklaus and his company Nicklaus Design, a partnership between Nicklaus, his four sons, and his son-in-law—one of the largest golf design practices in the world.

In the mid-1960s, Pete Dye initially requested Nicklaus's advice for the design of The Golf Club in suburban Columbus, Ohio. His first design Harbour Town Golf Links, co-credited with Dye, was opened for play in 1969. A subsequent early, yet more prominent design was Muirfield Village Golf Club in Dublin, Ohio which opened in 1974 and has hosted the Memorial Tournament since its inception in 1976. This course has also hosted the 1987 Ryder Cup and the 1998 Solheim Cup matches. For the first few years, all of his projects were co-designs with either Pete Dye or Desmond Muirhead.

The company has designed over 410 courses in 45 countries, over 1% of all the courses in the world. Most Nicklaus-designed courses are in the United States, but courses are found in Asia, Australia, Canada, Europe, and Mexico.

== Nicklaus-designed courses ==
An up to date list can be found via Nicklaus Design's database:

=== 1970s ===
- John's Island (Vero Beach, Florida), south course – 1970
- Wabeek Country Club (Bloomfield Hills, Michigan) – 1972
- Golf Center at Kings Island (Mason, Ohio) - Now the Grizzly Golf and Social Lodge
  - Bruin – 1972
  - Grizzly – 1972
- Mayacoo Lakes Country Club (West Palm Beach, Florida) – 1973
- New Saint Andrews Golf Club (Otawara, Tochigi, Japan) – 1973
- Bay Valley Golf Course (Bay City, Michigan) – 1973
- The Country Club at Muirfield Village (Dublin, Ohio) – 1974
- Glen Abbey Golf Course (Oakville, Ontario) – 1976
- La Moraleja Golf Club (Madrid), Alcobendas – 1976
- Shoal Creek Golf and Country Club (Birmingham, Alabama) – 1976
- The Australian Golf Club (Rosebery, Australia) – 1977 (redesign)
- The Greenbrier (White Sulphur Springs, West Virginia), Greenbrier course – 1978 (redesign)

=== 1980s ===
- Bear's Paw Country Club (Naples, Florida) – 1980
- Lochinvar Golf Club (Houston, Texas) – 1980
- Annandale Golf Club (Madison, Mississippi) – 1981
- Castle Pines Golf Club (Castle Rock, Colorado) – 1981
- The Club at Morningside (Rancho Mirage, California) – 1981
- The Hills of Lakeway (Austin, Texas), Country Club course – 1981
- Sailfish Point Golf Club (Stuart, Florida) – 1981
- Turtle Point Golf Club (Kiawah Island, South Carolina) – 1981
- Bear Creek Golf Club (Murrieta, California) – 1982
- The Country Club at Muirfield Village (Dublin, Ohio) – 1982
- Atlanta Country Club (Atlanta, Georgia) – 1983 (redesign)
- Park Meadows Country Club (Park City, Utah) – 1983
- Bear Lakes Country Club (West Palm Beach, Florida) – 1984
  - Lakes course – 1985
  - Links course – 1987
- Country Club of the Rockies (Edwards, Colorado) – 1984
- Desert Highlands (Scottsdale, Arizona) – 1984
- Elk River Golf Club (Banner Elk, North Carolina) – 1984
- Grand Cypress Golf Club (Orlando, Florida) – 1984
  - new course – 1988
- Grand Traverse Resort (Acme, Michigan) – 1984
- La Paloma Country Club (Tucson, Arizona) – 1984
- The Loxahatchee Club (Jupiter, Florida) – 1984
- Meridian Golf Club (Englewood, Colorado) – 1984
- Britannia Golf and Beach Club (Grand Cayman) – 1985
- Kiyokawa Country Club (Kanagawa, Japan) – 1985
- St. Andrews Golf Club (Hastings-on-Hudson, New York) – 1985 (redesign)
- The Country Club at Castle Pines (Castle Rock, Colorado) – 1986
- The Country Club of Louisiana (Baton Rouge, Louisiana) – 1986
- Dallas Athletic Club (Dallas, Texas), Blue course – 1986
- St. Mellion Hotel Golf & Country Club (Cornwall, England) – 1986
- Valhalla Golf Club (Louisville, Kentucky) – 1986
- Breckenridge Golf Club (Breckenridge, Colorado) – 1987
- Country Club of The South (Alpharetta, Georgia) – 1987
- Daufuskie Island Club & Resort (Hilton Head Island, South Carolina), Melrose course – 1987
- Desert Mountain (Scottsdale, Arizona)
  - Cochise – 1987
  - Renegade – 1987
- PGA West (La Quinta, California)
  - private course – 1987
  - resort course – 1987
- English Turn Golf & Country Club (New Orleans) – 1988
- Golf Club Crans-Sur-Sierre (Crans-Sur-Sierre, Switzerland) – 1988
- Golf Club Gut Altentann (Henndorf, Salzburg, Austria) – 1988
- Kauai Lagoons (Lihue, Hawaii)
  - Kiele course – 1988
  - Mokihana course – 1989
- Pawleys Plantation (Pawleys Island, South Carolina) – 1988
- Ptarmigan Country Club (Fort Collins, Colorado) – 1988
- Richland Country Club (Nashville, Tennessee) – 1988
- Sunny Field Golf Club (Gozenyama, Japan) – 1988
- Avila Golf & Country Club (Tampa, Florida) – 1989
- Dallas Athletic Club (Mesquite, Texas), Gold course – 1989
- Desert Mountain (Scottsdale, Arizona), Geronimo – 1989
- Eagle Oaks Golf Club (Farmingdale, New Jersey) – 1989
- The Long Bay Club (Longs, South Carolina) – 1989
- National Golf Club (Village of Pinehurst, North Carolina) – 1989
- Sherwood Country Club (Thousand Oaks, California) – 1989
- Shimonoseki Golden Golf Club (Shimonoseki, Japan) – 1989
- St. Creek Golf Club (Asuke, Japan) – 1989
- Sycamore Hills Golf Club (Fort Wayne, Indiana) – 1989
- Wynstone Golf Club (North Barrington, Illinois) – 1989

=== 1990s ===
- Country Club of Landfall (Wilmington, North Carolina), I – 1990
- Governors Club (Chapel Hill, North Carolina) – 1990
- Japan Memorial Golf Club (Yakawa-cho, Japan) – 1990
- Oakmont Golf Club (Yamazoe, Nara, Japan) – 1990
- PGA National (Palm Beach Gardens, Florida) – 1990 (redesign)
- TPC of Michigan (Dearborn, Michigan) – 1990
- Colleton River Plantation Club (Bluffton, South Carolina) – 1991
- Dove Canyon Country Club (Dove Canyon, California) – 1991
- Hanbury Manor (Ware, England) – 1991
- Hokkaido Classic Golf Club (Hayakita, Hokkaido, Japan) – 1991
- Ibis Golf & CC (West Palm Beach, Florida)
  - Heritage – 1991
  - Legend – 1991
- Legacy Golf Links (Aberdeen, North Carolina) – 1991
- Mission Hills Golf Club (Thamuang, Thailand), Kanchanaburi – 1991
- Mount Juliet (Thomastown, County Kilkenny, Ireland) – 1991
- Paris International Golf Club (Paris) – 1991
- The Club at Nevillewood (Nevillewood, Pennsylvania) – 1992
- Damai Indah Golf & Country Club (Jakarta) – 1992
- Glenmoor Country Club (Canton, Ohio) – 1992
- Great Waters at Reynolds Plantation (Greensboro, Georgia) – 1992
- Hananomori Golf Club (Ohioira, Japan) – 1992
- Huis Ten Bosch Country Club (Seihi, Japan) – 1992
- Komono Golf Club (Komono, Mie, Japan) – 1992
- Laem Chabang International Country Club (Sriracha, Thailand) – 1992
- Manila Southwoods Golf & Country Club (Carmona, Philippines)
  - Legends – 1992
  - Masters – 1993
- Natural Park Ramindra Golf Club (Klongsamwa, Thailand) – 1992
- New Albany Country Club (New Albany, Ohio) – 1992
- The Challenge at Manele (Lanai City, Hawaii) – 1993
- Chang An Golf & Country Club (Hukou, Taiwan) – 1993
- Chung Shan Hot Spring Golf Club (Zhongshan City, China) – 1993
- Country Club of the North (Beavercreek, Ohio) – 1993
- Gleneagles Hotel (Auchterarder, Scotland), The PGA Centenary course – 1993
- Golden Bear Golf Club at Indigo Run (Hilton Head Island, South Carolina) – 1993
- Leo Palace Resort Manenggon Hills (Barrigada, Guam) – 1993
- The Medallion Club (Westerville, Ohio) – 1993
- Mission Hills Khao Yai Golf Club (Pak Chong, Thailand) – 1993
- Palmilla Golf Club (Los Cabos, Mexico) – 1993
- Santa Lucia River Club at Ballantrae (Port St. Lucie, Florida) – 1993
- Sendai Minami Golf Club (Shibat-gun, Japan) – 1993
- Springfield Royal Country Club (Cha-Am, Thailand) – 1993
- Sungai Long Golf & Country Club (Kajang, Malaysia) – 1993
- Barrington Golf Club (Aurora, Ohio) – 1994
- Cabo del Sol (Cabo San Lucas, Mexico), Ocean course – 1994
- Castlewoods Country Club (Brandon, Mississippi), The Bear – 1994
- Ishioka Golf Club (Ogawa, Ibaraki, Japan) – 1994
- London Golf Club (Ash, England)
  - The Heritage – 1994
  - The International – 1994
- Miramar Linkou Golf & Country Club (Linkou Hsiang, Taiwan) – 1994
- Mission Hills Golf Club (Shenzhen, China), World Cup course – 1994
- Montecastillo Hotel & Golf Resort (Cadiz, Spain) – 1994
- The Zenzation (Pak Chong, Thailand) – 1994
- Borneo Golf & Country Club (Bongawan, Malaysia) – 1995
- Bukit Darmo Golf Club (Surabaya, Indonesia) – 1995
- Taman Dayu (Surabaya, Indonesia) – 1995
- Eagle Bend Golf Club (Big Fork, Montana), Championship course – 1995
- Emeralda Golf & Country Club (Cimanggis, Indonesia), Plantation North course – 1995
- La Gorce Country Club (Miami Beach, Florida) – 1995 (redesign)
- Le Robinie Golf & Sporting Club (Solbiate Olona, Italy) – 1995
- Mission Hills Golf Club (Shenzhen, China), Valley course – 1995
- President Country Club (Tochigi, Japan) – 1995
- Sanyo Golf Club (Okayama, Japan) – 1995
- Tamarin Santana Golf Club (Batam, Indonesia) – 1995
- Williamsburg National (Williamsburg, Virginia) – 1995
- Bearpath Golf & Country Club (Eden Prairie, Minnesota) – 1996
- Bukit Barisan Country Club at Medan (Medan, Indonesia) – 1996
- Country Club Bosques (Hidalgo, Mexico) – 1996
- Desert Mountain (Scottsdale, Arizona)
  - Apache – 1996
  - Chiricahua – 1999
- Golf Club at Indigo Run (Hilton Head, South Carolina) – 1996
- The Golf Club of Purchase (Purchase, New York) – 1996
- Hammock Creek Golf Club (Palm City, Florida) – 1996
- Hertfordshire Golf & Country Club (Hertfordshire, England) – 1996
- Hibiki no Mori Country Club (Kurabuchi, Japan) – 1996
- Hualalai Golf Club (Kailua-Kona, Hawaii) – 1996
- Lakelands Golf Club (Robina, Australia) – 1996
- Nicklaus North Golf Course (Whistler, British Columbia) – 1996
- Rokko Kokusai (Kobe, Japan) – 1996
- Ruby Hill Golf Club (Pleasanton, California) – 1996
- Southshore at Lake Las Vegas (Henderson, Nevada) – 1996
- Sun Belgravia Golf Club (Nukata, Japan) – 1996
- Top of the Rock Golf Course (Ridgedale, Missouri) – 1996
- Aspen Glen Golf Club (Carbondale, Colorado) – 1997
- Bintan Lagoon (Bintan, Indonesia), Seaview course – 1997
- Forest Hills Golf & Country Club (Inarawan, Philippines) – 1997
- Golfplatz Gut Laerchenhof (Pulheim, Germany) – 1997
- Great Bear Golf & Country Club (East Stroudsburg, Pennsylvania) – 1997
- James Island (Victoria, British Columbia) – 1997
- Legends Golf & Country Resort (Kulai, Johr, Malaysia) – 1997
- Montreux Golf & Country Club (Reno, Nevada) – 1997
- Old Works Golf Course (Anaconda, Montana) – 1997
- Ruitoque Country Club (Bucaramanga, Colombia) – 1997
- Salem Glen Country Club (Clemmons, North Carolina) – 1997
- Spring City Resort (Kunming City, China) – 1997
- Stonewolf Golf Club (Fairview Heights, Illinois) – 1997
- Suzhou Sunrise Golf Club (Suzhou, China) – 1997
- Taman Dayu Club (Pandaan, East Java, Indonesia) – 1997
- Arzaga Golf Club (Drugolo di Lonato, Brescia, Italy) – 1998
- The Bear Trace at Cumberland Mountain (Crossville, Tennessee) – 1998
- Carden Park (Cheshire, England) – 1998
- Classic Golf Resort (New Delhi, India), Basant Lok – 1998
- Empire Hotel & Country Club (Negara Brunei Darussalam, Jerudong, Brunei) – 1998
- Grand Haven Golf Club (Palm Coast, Florida) – 1998
- J&P Golf Club (Utsonomiya, Tochigi, Japan) – 1998
- Laurel Springs Golf Club (Suwanee, Georgia) – 1998
- Legends West at Diablo Grande (Patterson, California) – 1998
- Nanhu Country Club (Guangzhou, China) – 1998
- Pecanwood Estate (Hartebeespoort Dam, South Africa) – 1998
- Phoenix Park Golf Club (Pyeongchang, South Korea) – 1998
- Reflection Bay Golf Club at Lake Las Vegas (Henderson, Nevada) – 1998
- Sherwood Hills Golf & Country Club (Trece Martires, Cavite, Philippines) – 1998
- Superstition Mountain Golf & Country Club (Superstition Mountain, Arizona)
  - Prospector – 1998
  - Lost Gold – 1999
- Vermont National Country Club (South Burlington, Vermont) – 1998
- Westlake Golf & Country Club (Hangzhou, China) – 1998
- Alabang Country Club (Alabang, Muntinlupa, Philippines) – 1999
- Aliso Viejo Golf Club (Aliso Viejo, California) – 1999
- Aston Oaks (North Bend, Ohio) – 1999
- The Bear Trace at Harrison Bay (Harrison, Tennessee) – 1999
- The Bear Trace at Tims Ford (Winchester, Tennessee) – 1999
- Camp John Hay (Bagio, Benguet, Philippines) – 1999
- The Club at Twin Eagles (Naples, Florida) – 1999
- Coyote Creek Golf Club (San Jose, California), tournament course – 1999
- El Dorado Golf & Beach Club (San Jose del Cabo, Mexico) – 1999
- Estrella Mountain Ranch Golf Club (Goodyear, Arizona) – 1999
- Four Seasons Golf Club Punta Mita (Punta Mita, Nayarit, Mexico,) – 1999
- The Golden Bear Club at Keene's Pointe (Windermere, Florida) – 1999
- The Golf Club at Mansion Ridge (Monroe, New York) – 1999
- Grand Bear Golf Course (Saucier, Mississippi) – 1999
- New Capital Golf Club (Yamaoka, Gigu, Japan) – 1999
- Okanagan Golf Club (Kelowna, British Columbia) – 1999
- Palm Island Golf Club (Hui Yang City, China) – 1999
- Palmilla Ocean Nine (San Jose del Cabo, Mexico) – 1999
- Punta Mita Club de Golf (Punta Mita, Nayarit, Mexico), Pacifico course – 1999
- The Roaring Fork Club (Basalt, Colorado) – 1999
- Rocky Gap Lodge & Golf Resort (Flintstone, Maryland) – 1999
- Shanghai Links Golf & Country Club (Shanghai) – 1999
- Spring Creek Ranch (Collierville, Tennessee) – 1999
- TPC Snoqualmie Ridge (Snoqualmie, Washington) – 1999

=== 2000s ===
- Achasta Golf Club (Dahlonega, Georgia) – 2000
- Bear Creek Golf Course (Chandler, Arizona)
  - [main] – 2000
  - short course – 2001
- The Bear Trace at Chickasaw (Henderson, Tennessee) – 2000
- The Bear's Club (Jupiter, Florida) – 2000
- Bear's Paw Japan Country Club (Kouga-gun, Shiga-ken, Japan) – 2000
- The Club at Porto Cima (Lake Ozark, Missouri) – 2000
- Country Club of Landfall (Wilmington, North Carolina), II – 2000
- Gapyeong Benest Golf Club (Gapyeong-gun, South Korea) – 2000
- The Heritage Golf and Country Club (Melbourne) – 2000
- King & Bear Golf Club (St Augustine, Florida) – 2000
- Las Campanas (Santa Fe, New Mexico), Sunset – 2000
- The Ocean Course at Hammock Beach (Palm Coast, Florida) – 2000
- Pasadera Country Club (Monterey, California) – 2000
- Whispering Pines Golf Club (Trinity, Texas) – 2000
- Winghaven Country Club (O'Fallon, Missouri) – 2000
- Bear Trace at Ross Creek Landing (Clifton, Tennessee) – 2001
- Bear's Best Las Vegas (Las Vegas, Nevada) – 2001
- Breckenridge (Breckenridge, Colorado), Elk Nine – 2001
- The Club at Carlton Woods (The Woodlands, Texas) – 2001
- Coyote Creek Golf Club (Bartonville, Illinois) – 2001
- Coyote Creek Golf Club (San Jose, California), Valley course – 2001
- Cozumel Country Club (Cozumel, Mexico) – 2001
- Ibis Golf & CC (West Palm Beach, Florida), Tradition – 2001
- Mayacama Golf Club (Santa Rosa, California) – 2001
- Montreux (Reno, Nevada), 3-hole – 2001
- Nicklaus Golf Club at Lionsgate (Overland Park, Kansas) – 2001
- Olympic Staff Ashikaga Golf Course (Ashikaga, Tochigi, Japan) – 2001
- Pine Valley Golf & Country Club (Beijing)
  - Golden Bear course – 2001
  - Nicklaus course – 2007
- Ross Creek Landing (Clifton, Tennessee) – 2001
- The Summit at Cordillera (Edwards, Colorado) – 2001
- Vista Vallarta Golf Club (Puerto Vallarta, Jalisco, Mexico) – 2001
- WuYi Fountain Palm Golf Club (Jiangmen, China) – 2001
- Bear's Best Atlanta (Suwanee, Georgia) – 2002
- Canadas De Santa Fe (Mexico City, Mexico) – 2002
- Cherry Creek Country Club (Denver, Colorado) – 2002
- Cimarron Hills Country Club (Georgetown, Texas) – 2002
- Dalhousie Golf Club (Cape Girardeau, Missouri) – 2002
- The Hills of Lakeway (Austin, Texas), Flintrock Fans course – 2002
- The Club at Hokulia (Kailua-Kona, Hawaii) – 2002
- Lost Tree Club (North Palm Beach, Florida) – 2002 (redesign)
- The Moon Palace Golf Club (Cancún, Mexico) – 2002
- Northern Bear Golf Club (Sherwood Park, Alberta) – 2002
- Pinehills Golf Club (Plymouth, Massachusetts) – 2002
- The Reserve at Lake Keowee (Sunset, South Carolina) – 2002
- Reserve Club at Woodside Plantation (Aiken, South Carolina) – 2002
- The Ritz-Carlton Golf Club and Spa (Jupiter, Florida) – 2002
- Takaraike Golf Course (Nara, Japan) – 2002
- The Tradition Golf Club (Okazaki-shi, Aichi, Japan) – 2002
- Arabian Ranches (Dubai, United Arab Emirates) – 2003
- The Bear's Club Par 3 (Jupiter, Florida) – 2003
- Bear Mountain Golf & Country Club (Victoria, British Columbia) – 2003
- The Bull at Pinehurst Farms (Sheboygan Falls, Wisconsin) – 2003
- The Club at Longview (Charlotte, North Carolina) – 2003
- Desert Mountain (Scottsdale, Arizona), Outlaw – 2003
- Mayan Palace (Riviera Maya, Mexico) – 2003
- Pearl Valley Golf Estate & Spa (Franschhoek, Western Cape, South Africa) – 2003
- Royal Palm Yacht & Country Club (Boca Raton, Florida) – 2003
- Sagamore Club (Noblesville, Indiana) – 2003
- Angeles National Golf Club (Sunland, California) – 2004
- Chapelco Golf & Resort (San Martin de los Andes, Neuquen, Argentina) – 2004
- The Club at Pronghorn (Bend, Oregon) – 2004
- Laguna Del Mar (Puerto Penasco, Sonora, Mexico) – 2004
- May River Club (Bluffton, South Carolina) – 2004
- Mission Hills Phuket Golf Resort & Spa (Talang, Phuket, Thailand) – 2004
- Old Greenwood (Truckee, California) – 2004
- Toscana Country Club (Indian Wells, California) – 2004
- Traditions Club (Bryan, Texas) – 2004
- Tres Marias Residencial Golf Club (Morelia, Michoacan, Mexico) – 2004
- Bay Creek (Cape Charles, Virginia) – 2005
- Bay Point Golf Club (Panama City Beach, Florida) – 2005 (redesign)
- Bayside Resort Golf Club (Selbyville, Delaware) – 2005
- The Bridges Golf & Country Club (Montrose, Colorado) – 2005
- Champions Retreat Golf Club (Augusta, Georgia), Bluffs course – 2005
- The Cliffs at Walnut Cove (Asheville, North Carolina) – 2005
- Club Polaris Golf Resort (Seoul) – 2005
- Escena (Palm Springs, California) – 2005
- Machynys Peninsula Golf Club (Carmarthenshire, Wales) – 2005
- Moon Palace (Cancun, Mexico), 3rd nine – 2005
- Olympic Country Club (Misato-cho, Japan), Lake Tsuburada – 2005
- Palisades Country Club (Charlotte, North Carolina) – 2005
- Simola Golf & Country Lodge (Knysna, South Africa) – 2005
- Toscana Country Club (Indian Wells, California), North – 2005
- The Broadmoor Golf Club (Colorado Springs, Colorado) – 2006
- Cordillera Ranch (Boerne, Texas) – 2006
- Dismal River Club (Mullen, Nebraska) – 2006
- La Torre Golf Resort (Torre Pacheco, Murcia, Spain) – 2006
- North Palm Beach Country Club (North Palm Beach, Florida) – 2006
- The Peninsula (Puerto Penasco, Sonora, Mexico) – 2006
- The Peninsula Golf & Country Club (Millsboro, Delaware) – 2006
- Punta Espada (Punta Cana, Dominican Republic) – 2006
- Puntiro Golf Club (Mallorca, Spain) – 2006
- Real de Faula (Xeresa, Valencia, Spain) – 2006
- Reserve Club at St. James Plantation (Southport, North Carolina) – 2006
- The Retreat Golf & Country Club (Corona, California) – 2006
- Ohio State University (Columbus, Ohio), Scarlet course – 2006 (redesign)
- Sebonack Golf Club (Southampton, New York) – 2006
- Sherwood Lake Club (Thousand Oaks, California) – 2006
- St. Francis Links (St. Francis Bay, South Africa) – 2006
- Asturiano Golf Club (Cuautla, Mexico) – 2007
- The Cliffs at Keowee (Sunset, South Carolina) – 2007
- Club Campestre (Cabo San Lucas, Mexico) – 2007
- Cougar Canyon Golf Links (Trinidad, Colorado) – 2007
- El Valle Golf Resort (Torre Pacheco, Spain) – 2007
- The Kinloch Club/Jack Nicklaus Golf Club New Zealand (Kinloch, New Zealand) – 2007
- La Loma Club de Golf (San Luis Potosí, Mexico) – 2007
- Monte Rei (Faro, Portugal) – 2007
- Moorea Golf Resort (Moorea) – 2007
- Nordelta (Buenos Aires, Argentina) – 2007
- Oak Valley Resort (Wonju, Kangwan-Do, South Korea) – 2007
- Old Corkscrew (Estero, Florida) – 2007
- Promontory (The Ranch Club, Park City, Utah) – 2007
- Real de Faula (Benidorm, Valencia, Spain), II – 2007
- Sky 72 Golf Club (Incheon, South Korea), Ocean course – 2007
- Suzhou Sunrise (Suzhou, China), II – 2007
- Ginn Reunion Resort (Reunion, Florida), Tradition course – 2007
- Villaitama & Villaitama (Benidorm, Spain) – 2007
- Whispering Oak at Verandah Club (Ft. Myers, Florida) – 2007
- Bear Lake Golf Club (Cashiers, North Carolina) – 2008
- Bosque Real (Mexico City, Mexico) – 2008
- The Club at Creighton Farms (Loudoun County, Virginia) – 2008
- Coyote Springs (Clark County, Nevada), The Chase – 2008
- Donneako Country Club (Seogwipo, Jeju Island, South Korea) – 2008
- El Rio Country Club (Guadalajara, Mexico) – 2008
- Hacienda Riquelme Golf Resort (Sucina, Spain) – 2008
- The Idaho Club (Sandpoint, Idaho) – 2008
- Killeen Castle Golf Resort (Dunshaughlin, Ireland) – 2008
- Puerto Los Cabos (Punta Gorda, Mexico) – 2008
- Riviera Cancun (Tecera Etapa de Cancun, Quintana Roo, Mexico) – 2008
- Samanah Country Club (Marrakech, Morocco) – 2008
- Shadow Creek (Beijing) – 2008
- Temae Resort (Tahiti) – 2008
- Tseleevo Golf Polo Club (Moscow, Russia) – 2008
- Yucatan Village & Resort (Mérida, Yucatán, Mexico) – 2008
- Bear Mountain Resort (Victoria, British Columbia), Valley course – 2009
- Punta Mita Bahia (Punta Mita, Mexico) – 2009
- Red Ledges (Heber City, Utah) – 2009
- The Ritz Carlton Golf Club (Dove Mountain, Tucson, Arizona) – 2009
- Serengeti Golf and Wildlife Estate (Johannesburg, South Africa) – 2009
- The Club at 12 Oaks (Holly Springs, North Carolina) – 2009
- Twelve Shores Golf Club (Logan, New Mexico) – 2009

=== 2010s ===
- Angel Hill (Chongqing, China) – 2010
- Applecross Country Club (Downingtown, Pennsylvania) – 2010
- Cao Fei Dian Golf Club (Tangshan City, China) – 2010
- Condado de Alhama (Torre Pacheco, Spain), I – 2010
- Fyre Lake National (Sherrard, Illinois) – 2010
- Penati Golf Resort (Senica, Slovakia), Legend course – 2010
- Hampton Pointe at New River (Hilton Head, South Carolina) – 2010
- Houghton Golf Club (Johannesburg, South Africa) – 2010
- Jack Nicklaus Golf Club Korea (Songdo City, South Korea) – 2010
- Kingrun Nanshan Golf Club (Chongqing, China) – 2010
- Las Terrazas de La Torre Golf Resort (Torre Pacheco, Spain) – 2010
- Mar Menor Golf Resort (Torre Pacheco, Spain) – 2010
- Mayan Palace Puerto Penasco (Puerto Penasco, Mexico), II – 2010
- Magnolia Green Golf Club (Moseley, Virginia) – 2010
- Paradise Ranch Resort (Grants Pass, Oregon) – 2010
- Pine Valley Executive Course (Beijing) – 2010
- Timber Banks Golf Club (Baldwinsville, New York) – 2010
- Westham Golf Club at Magnolia Green (Chesterfield Co., Virginia) – 2010
- Yeoju Grand CC (Yeoju, South Korea) – 2010
- The Golf Club at Harbor Shores (Benton Harbor, Michigan) – 2010
- Fyre Lake Golf Club (Sherrard, Illinois) – 2011
- Rock Creek Golf Club (Gordonville, Texas) – 2011
- Kalhaar Blues & Greens Golf Club (Ahmedabad, India) – 2012
- Summit Rock (Horseshoe Bay, Texas) – 2012
- Potomac Shores Golf Club (Potomac Shores, Virginia) – 2014
- The Reserve at Moonlight Basin (Big Sky, Montana) – 2015
- Trump Golf Links Ferry Point (Bronx, New York) – 2015
- Major Series of Putting (Las Vegas) – 2016
- Naples Beach Hotel and Golf Resort (Naples, Florida) – 2016
- Baha Mar (Nassau, Bahamas) – 2017
- Owl's Nest Resort (Thornton, New Hampshire) – 2018
- American Lake Veterans Golf Course (Tacoma, Washington) – 2019
- Golden Cub Mini Golf (Jupiter, Florida) – 2019
- Montecito Country Club (Santa Barbara, California) – 2019
- Valley of the Eagles (Elyria, Ohio) – 2018
- Wood River Country Club (Wood River, Nebraska) – 2022

=== Planned ===
- Bear Creek at Burrus Ridge (Nashville, Tennessee)
- Bear's Best Cheongna (Cheongna Golf District, South Korea)
- Beihai (Silver Beach, China), II
- Buenaventura Golf Club (Farallón, Coclé, Panama)
- Campeche Playa Golf Marina & Spa Resort (Campeche, Mexico)
- Cana Bay Golf Club (Punta Cana, Dominican Republic)
- Cap Cana (Punta Cana, Dominican Republic)
  - Bluffs Course
  - Las Iguanas
- Chambord Country Club (Paris, France)
- Chiba National Golf Club (Chiba, Japan)
- Chongming Island Golf Club (Chenjia Town, China)
- Ciputra Hanoi International Golf Club (Hanoi, Vietnam)
- Collina Tinta (Hurricane, Utah)
- Condado de Alhama (Torre Pacheco, Spain)
  - II
  - III
- Coyote Springs (Clark County, Nevada)
  - I
  - II
  - III
- Cristallago (Lakeport, California)
- Dalquharran Castle (South Ayrshire, Scotland)
- Deqing New Century (Zhejiang Province, China)
- Dneprovskaya Riviera (Kyiv, Ukraine)
- EnVain SeniorTown (Chuncheon, Kangwan-do, South Korea)
- Fazenda Serrazul (Fazenda SerrAzul, Brazil)
- Forest Lakes Country Club (Halifax, Nova Scotia)
- Fusong (Baishan City, China)
- Grand Phnom Penh Golf Club (Phnom Penh, Cambodia)
- Grandvista (Maricopa County, Arizona)
- Guacalito Golf Club (Rivas, Nicaragua)
- Guanacaste Country Club (Liberia, Costa Rica)
- Guiyang Golf Club (Guiyang, Guangxi, China)
- Hai Xi International Golf Course (Ma Yang Xi Ecotourism Area, China)
- Headwaters Golf Club (Granby, Colorado)
- Heawon (Gangwon-Do, South Korea)
- Hunest Golf Resort (Hong Cheon, South Korea)
- Ibar Golf Club (Dolna Bania, Sofia Region, Bulgaria)
- Jack Nicklaus Golf Club Anguilla (Anguilla)
- Jack Nicklaus Golf Club of the Bahamas (Royal Island, Bahamas)
- Jack Nicklaus Golf Club Patagonia (Bariloche, Argentina)
- Jack Nicklaus Golf Club St. Lucia (Point Hardy, St. Lucia)
- Jakarta Golf Club (Jakarta, Indonesia)
- Jeffrey's Bay (Jeffrey's Bay, South Africa)
- Jiangsu (Jurong City, China)
- Jin Hae (JinHae, Kynungsangnam-do, South Korea)
- Jinhai Lake Resort (Pinggu District, Beijing)
- Karibana (Cartagena, Colombia)
- Kilada Hills (Kilada, Greece)
- Kingman Arizona (Kingman, Arizona)
- Kobe Country Club (Kobe, Japan)
- Kuaradé (Luis Correia, Piauí, Brazil)
- Kunming Country Club (Kunming, China)
- Limni Golf Resort (Pafos, Cyprus)
- Long Phuoc Golf Course (Ho Chi Minh City, Vietnam)
- Los Canales de plottier Patagonia Golf and Resort (Neuquén, Argentina)
- Ludhiana (Ludhiana, India)
- Maya Island (Abu Dhabi, United Arab Emirates)
- Mayan Palace (Nuevo Vallarta, Mexico)
- Mayazama (Tulum, Mexico)
- Meletse (Waterberg, South Africa)
- Monsaraz (Monsaraz, Portugal)
- Palm Hills Golf Club & Resort (Cairo, Egypt)
- Papua New Guinea (Bootless Bay, New Guinea)
- Patagonia Virgin (Frutillar, Tenth Region, Chile)
- Penasco Bay (Puerto Penasco, Mexico)
- Peninsula Papagayo (Costa Rica)
- Raevo (Moscow, Russia)
- Pilará (Pilar, Argentina)
- Porto Mariccio (Istrian Peninsula, Croatia)
- Punta Gorda (Puerto Los Cabos resort, San José del Cabo, Mexico)
- Queens Gap Golf Club (Lake Lure, North Carolina)
- Quivira Los Cabos (Cabo San Lucas, Mexico)
- Red Ledges Par 3 (Heber City, Utah,) – 2016
- Rothbury Country Resort (Cessnock, New South Wales, Australia)
- Royal Maluti (Clarens, Free State, South Africa)
- Sabana Falls Golf Course (El Salto, Liberia, Costa Rica)
- Safisa Palace (Antalya, Turkey)
- Salamansa Sands (São Vicente, Cape Verde)
- Santa Maria Golf & Country Club (Panama City, Panama)
- Sanya Resort & Golf Club (Li Race Autonomous County, China)
- Seaside Mariana Spa & Golf Resort (Pochomil, Nicaragua)
- Serra de Santa Clara (São Paulo, Brazil)
- Shin Do Golf Club (Chuncheon, South Korea)
- Sitia Bay (Sitia Bay, Greece)
- Soto de Mozanaque, Golf La Moraleja (Madrid, Spain)
- St. Elisabeth Golf Resort (Limassol, Cyprus)
- St. Petersburg (Saint Petersburg, Russia)
- Tae Woong Golf Club (Hong Cheon, Kangnam-do, South Korea)
- Tramore (Waterford, Ireland)
- Trellis Bay (Tortola, British Virgin Islands)
- Tripoli Golf Club (Tripoli, Libya)
- Tuscany Hills (Copperopolis, California)
- Ullna Golf Club (Roslagsvagen, Sweden)
- Ury Estate (Stonehaven, Scotland)
- Valle Del Golf (Córdoba, Argentina)
- Veracruz Intra (Veracruz, Mexico)
- Viveros Resort (Isla Viveros, Panama)
- Windrose (Pawling, New York)
- Xi'an Golf Club (Xi'an City, China)
- Xiaoshan New Century (Zhejiang Province, China)
- Yasmine Golf Club (Hammamet, Tunisia)
- Zacatecas (Zacatecas, Mexico)
