= Kalhaar Blues & Greens Golf Club =

Golf course in Ahmadabad, Gujarat, India

- Interactive map of Kalhaar Blues & Greens Golf Club
- 23°01′N 72°22′E

Club information
- Established: 2012
- Owner: Navratna Organisers & Developers Pvt Ltd
- Operator: Navratna Organisers & Developers Pvt Ltd
- Tota holes: 18
- Website: kalhaarbluesandgreens.com
- Designed by: Jack Nicklaus
- Par: 72
- Length: 7,425 yards (6,789 m)
- Course rating: 76.8
- Slope rating: 142
- Course record: Shubhankar Sharma (64) and Praket Sharma (64)

Map

Kalhaar Blues & Greens Golf Club is a golf course located in the city of Ahmadabad in the Indian state of Gujarat. It was designed by Jack Nicklaus’s firm, Nicklaus Design. The construction began in 2012, and the course quickly gained recognition as one of the golfing destinations in the country. In 2015, it was named India’s Best Golf Course by multiple national and international golf bodies. Built to United States Golf Association (USGA) standards, the course features a challenging layout with 14 water bodies and holds the distinction of being India’s longest golf course from the championship tees. It has also hosted major professional tournaments, including the PGTI Ahmedabad Masters.

== History ==
The golf course was designed by Jack Nicklaus's company Nicklaus Design. Construction began in 2012. It is one of India's most famous golf courses and was rated as India's Best Golf Course of 2015 by World Golf Awards and India Golf Awards.

== Design ==
The golf course is spread over 175 acres and plays up to 7,425 yards from the championship tees, making it India's longest golf course. The club was developed by the Navratna Group, Ahmedabad. It was designed to comply with United States Golf Association (USGA) specifications. The golf course layout has unique challenges and aesthetics including sand, beach bunkers and 14 water bodies covering over 35 acres.

The course has a scenic island green on the seventh hole 7 (174 yards, par 3) that covers over 35 acres. In addition to this, the seventh has a slope rating of 76.8 and 142 meaning that a scratch golfer can play 4.8 over the course (76.8-72) from the back tees.

In April 2015, the club hosted the PGTI Ahmedabad Masters 2015, the first tournament of the super series launched by PGTI on the lines of the USPGA’s FedEx Cup and European tours race to Dubai.
