= Tres Marias Championship =

Golf tournament formerly on the LPGA Tour

Tournament information
- Location: Morelia, Michoacán, Mexico
- Established: 2005
- Course: Tres Marias Residential Golf Club
- Par: 73
- Length: 6,539 yards (5,979 m)
- Tour: LPGA Tour
- Format: Stroke play – 72 holes
- Prize fund: US$1,300,000
- Month played: April
- Final year: 2010

Tournament record score
- Aggregate: 267 Lorena Ochoa (2008, 2009)
- To par: −25 Lorena Ochoa (2008, 2009)

Final champion
- (Japan) Ai Miyazato

The Tres Marias Championship was a women's professional golf tournament on the LPGA Tour, played from 2005 to 2010, at Tres Marias Residential Golf Club in Morelia, Michoacán, Mexico.

From 2005 through 2009 the title sponsor of the tournament was Mexican beer Corona. Lorena Ochoa of Mexico won the event three times: 2006, 2008, and 2009.

The 2011 tournament was originally scheduled for April 21–24. On February 3, the LPGA announced that the tournament had been canceled because of concerns about violence in the Mexican state of Michoacán but in reality there was a lack of sponsors to keep going the tournament as Lorena Ochoa retired that year.

The tournament was not scheduled in 2012.

== Tournament names ==
- 2005–2006: Corona Morelia Championship
- 2007–2009: Corona Championship
- 2010: Tres Marias Championship

== Winners ==
Year	Date	Champion	Country	Winning score	To par	Margin of victory	Purse (US$)	Winner's share ($)
2011	Apr 24	Tournament canceled in February due to security concerns						
2010	May 2	Ai Miyazato	Japan	63-72-71-67=273	–19	1 stroke	1,300,000	195,000
2009	Apr 26	Lorena Ochoa (3)	Mexico	69-64-67-68=267	––25	1 stroke	1,300,000	195,000
2008	Apr 13	Lorena Ochoa (2)	Mexico	66-66-66-69=267	–25	11 strokes	1,300,000	195,000
2007	Apr 29	Silvia Cavalleri	Italy	69-68-68-66=272	–20	2 strokes	1,300,000	195,000
2006	Oct 8	Lorena Ochoa	Mexico	71-64-68-69=272	–20	5 strokes	1,000,000	150,000
2005	Apr 24	Carin Koch	Sweden	68-69-71-71=279	–9	6 strokes	1,000,000	150,000

== Tournament record ==
Year	Player	Score	Round
2010	Ai Miyazato	63 (–10)	1st
