= Jack Nicklaus 4 =

1997 video game

- Windows cover art
- Developer: Cinematronics
- Publishers: Accolade; MacSoft (Macintosh version only)
- Producers: Michael Franco; Brad Fregger
- Designers: Michael Franco; Brad Fregger
- Series: Jack Nicklaus
- Platforms: Microsoft Windows; Macintosh; DVD-ROM
- Release: March 25, 1997 (Windows); Q2 1997 (Machintosh)
- Genre: Sports
- Modes: Single-player, multiplayer

Jack Nicklaus 4 is a 1997 sports golf video game. It was published by Accolade, and is the fourth in a series of video games named after golfer Jack Nicklaus, following Jack Nicklaus Golf & Course Design: Signature Edition (1992). The original Microsoft Windows version was developed by Cinematronics. Versions were also released for Macintosh and DVD. A PlayStation version titled Jack Nicklaus '98 was also in development. The game was followed by Jack Nicklaus 5, released later in 1997.

== Gameplay ==
Jack Nicklaus 4 includes eight different game modes. The game features five 18-hole courses, including four real-life courses: Muirfield Village, Colleton River Plantation, Country Club of the South and Cabo del Sol. The fifth course is Winding Springs, a fictional location created by the developers using a golf course designer program that comes with the game. The course designer allows the player to create a custom golf course, one hole at a time. The course designer includes over 100 scalable objects, including bushes, trees, and rocks. Approximately two-thirds of the game's instruction manual is devoted to the course designer, which also includes a built-in wizard program to aid the user. The game includes the ability to import and convert online user-created golf courses from Jack Nicklaus Golf & Course Design: Signature Edition, which also featured a course designer. Courses created in Jack Nicklaus 4 are compatible with the game's sequel, Jack Nicklaus 5. The player competes against various opponents throughout the game, including Jack Nicklaus, who is not a playable character. The game includes four multiplayer modes, via serial cable, modem, LAN, or the Internet. While aiming, the player can get an overhead view that goes up to 150 feet high.

The DVD version includes 10 game modes and an ABC Sports video titled Toughest 18 Holes. The DVD version also features four golf courses, as well as six others that were made with the course designer. In addition, the game offers three types of weather and five types of wind.

== Development and release ==
Jack Nicklaus 4 was developed by Cinematronics, with Michael Franco as producer. The team's goal was to develop a game which would recreate the experience of playing real golf, partially through graphics and sounds. The game would also offer more viewing angles than other golf games, and more control over the swing profile. During development, the game included the subtitle Golden Bear Edition. Development was underway as of January 1995, and the game was announced that month at the Winter Consumer Electronics Show. The game was developed for Microsoft Windows due to the operating system's increased prevalence.

Franco produced the game on behalf of Accolade, while Brad Fregger produced it for Cinematronics; they both also handled the game design. Fregger joined the development team in 1996, when Cinematronics contacted him to help finish the game. Dennis Clark programmed the physics, while Mike Sandige programmed the rendering. Jim Mischel programmed the course designer. The game includes 16.7 million colors. The game does not support 3D cards, as it already uses a fast rendering engine. Another factor was scheduling and the competitive market, prompting Accolade to release the game without 3D card support. The game has 32 megabytes' worth of sound, which include regionally authentic bird sounds for the golf courses. The game uses DirectSound, and its multiplayer mode utilizes DirectPlay. The course designer was modeled after Nicklaus Productions' computer-aided design system.

Accolade began shipping the Microsoft Windows version on March 25, 1997. In May 1997, Accolade announced that it would release the game on Macintosh later in the summer. A free upgrade with several new features was released online in June 1997. That month, Accolade announced it would release the game on DVD in the summer, to take advantage of the format's increasing popularity. A PlayStation version, titled Jack Nicklaus '98 and featuring the same courses as Jack Nicklaus 4, had been scheduled for release in late 1997, although it was never released. The Macintosh version was published by MacSoft. An online game, Jack Nicklaus Online Golf Tour, was released in 1998. It was based on the Jack Nicklaus 4 game engine, and online courses created with Jack Nicklaus 4 were playable through Jack Nicklaus Online Golf Tour.

== Reception ==
Reception

Review scores
Publication	Score
AllGame	4/5 (Windows); 3.5/5 (DVD)
Computer Gaming World	5/5 (Windows)
GameSpot	8.4/10 (Windows)
PC Zone	73/100 (Windows)
Coming Soon Magazine	89% (Windows)
MacAddict	2/5 (Mac)
Macworld	4/5 (Mac)
The San Diego Union-Tribune	4/4

Jack Nicklaus 4 received positive reviews, but sold poorly. The game was praised for its graphics, its multitude of online courses, and its course designer, (Note: According to multiple sources:) although some reviewers were critical of the inability to create custom objects with the designer. Some praised the golf ball animations for their realism when hitting different terrains.

Scott A. May of Computer Gaming World called it "the preeminent golf simulation of our time" and an "absolute model of perfection" with nearly "everything you could ever hope for" in a golfing video game. Anthony Baize of AllGame praised the game for its realism, options, and sound effects, but criticized the golfers for looking noticeably different against the game's backgrounds. T. Liam McDonald of GameSpot called it "a fine piece of work with only a couple minor flaws," which included a lack of certain ideas that McDonald hoped to see in a future Jack Nicklaus game.

Computer Gaming World and GameSpot noted that self-made golf courses could take up to 10 megabytes of space, considered high at the time. Computer Gaming World further noted that the game took approximately 171 megabytes of hard drive space to download, and wrote, "As if anticipating consumer resistance, Accolade makes absolutely no mention of this fact on the box or in the manual." The Edmonton Journal also mentioned the high installation requirements and noted that such requirements were not specified on the game's box. PC Zone criticized the game for difficult aiming and putting. The Palm Beach Post praised the course designer but considered it difficult to use. The newspaper praised the game's swing meter as "greatly improved" over previous games.

Macworld's Michael Gowan wrote about the Macintosh version, "Featuring five courses, network play, a convincing physics model, and the ability to create your own courses from scratch, this golf simulation has only one bogey: the delay between swinging the club and the corresponding animation." Dean Renninger of MacAddict stated that while some of the game's graphical details were good, they were "a far cry from photorealistic." Renninger considered the game too easy, and believed that the Links series was superior.

AllGame's Jonathan Sutyak reviewed the DVD version and criticized it for not taking advantage of the DVD format. In addition, Sutyak criticized the graphics and sound for not being improved over the computer version, and criticized the in-game instructions for being erroneous. He praised the gameplay and called the game "very good," but "not enough of an improvement" over the computer version, stating that people who owned the original version would have no reason to buy the DVD version.
