= Full Tilt! Pinball =

1995 video game

- North American box art
- Developer: Cinematronics
- Publisher: Maxis
- Composer: Matt Ridgeway
- Platforms: Windows (v1 and v1.1), Mac OS (v1.1 only)
- Release: November 16, 1995
- Genre: Pinball
- Modes: Single-player, multiplayer

Full Tilt! Pinball, known as Pinball 95 in Europe, is a 1995 pinball video game developed by Cinematronics and published by Maxis. It features pre-rendered 3D graphics and three tables: Space Cadet, Skulduggery, and Dragon's Keep. A sequel called Full Tilt! Pinball 2 was released in 1996.

A limited version of the game with just the Space Cadet table was licensed to Microsoft for inclusion in Microsoft Plus! and later bundled in multiple versions of the Windows operating system with the name 3D Pinball for Windows – Space Cadet.

== Development ==
Cinematronics was established as a dedicated Windows developer studio during a period when video games were predominantly developed for MS-DOS. In 1994, the company began development of a Doom-like first person shooter. David Stafford proposed the game, with the violence toned down and renamed to Gluem, to Microsoft's Alex St. John for inclusion in the upcoming Windows 95 operating system. However, Windows 95 head David Cole was not impressed with the concept and remarked, "Can't we just get a game of pinball or something like that?". St. John relayed the suggestion to Stafford, who the following day presented a brief of a game titled Pinball Wizard to Microsoft, who expressed interest in seeing the game. Since it was merely a concept, the team had to create a preliminary table design within a few days which they then faxed it to Microsoft, who approved it.

Windows 95 was targeting a release in early 1995, giving the team about nine months to produce a finished product, which pressured development. In December, the launch was delayed to August 1995, giving additional time to polish the game. Six months into development, the deal with Microsoft was formalised. In May 1995, Cinematronics secured a deal with Maxis for Full Tilt! Pinball with an additional two tables.

Product manager Kevin Gliner was responsible for the game's rules, scoring, and layout. He visited penny arcades to study the design of tables and their components, and looked into the history of pinball to understand how the tables had evolved. A fully 3D game was considered, but for simplicity it was ultimately decided to make a 2D top-down game with pre-rendered 3D graphics. Ryan Medeiros, the lead visual designer, used photos of various pinball machines found in Santa Cruz Beach Boardwalk for reference. The game's pre-rendered assets were created using TrueSpace, but were then shifted to an MS-DOS-based 3D program for easier programming. The table's design, as well as animations were created using Adobe Photoshop.

Initial programming was done in Delphi, which was later translated to C/C++ when the licensing deal with Microsoft was certain. The game also included portions of x86 assembly language. The physics engine was built by Mike Sandige, designed to be almost entirely data-driven. A scripting system was implemented to allow Sandige and Gliner to fine-tune the physics and materials of components. Particular attention was paid to the flippers, making them as realistic as possible while not being overly demanding on the hardware, and ensuring the ball would never pass through.

Following the release of 3D Pinball for Windows, Gliner received feedback from a designer of physical pinball tables, recommending adjustments such as the rollover light toggle and the flipper angle. These enhancements were incorporated into the Full Tilt! release.

On Microsoft's end, executive Jim Allchin wanted to showcase the new graphics and sound APIs in the next release of Windows NT, so it was decided to include 3D Pinball in Windows NT 4.0, despite NT being oriented towards businesses at the time. Microsoft engineer Dave Plummer was responsible for converting existing x86 portions, such as the sound engine, to C/C++, to make the game compatible with the Alpha, MIPS and PowerPC versions of NT 4.0. Later on, Raymond Chen implemented a frame-rate cap to reduce the CPU usage of the game, which he would later describe as his proudest Windows XP feature.

== Tables ==
On each table, side display show the player score, ball number, player number, various other information, and a table-specific image.

=== Space Cadet ===
The Space Cadet table features the player as a member of a space fleet that completes missions to increase rank. Players can attain nine different ranks (listed from lowest to highest): Cadet, Ensign, Lieutenant, Captain, LT Commander, Commander, Commodore, Admiral, and Fleet Admiral. Players accept a mission by hitting "mission targets" which select which mission they will take, and by going up the "launch ramp". Each mission has a set number of things for players to do, such as hitting the "attack bumpers" (which are a set of four bumpers at the top of the table) eight times (this is the "target practice" mission). Some missions involve a number of steps which must be completed in sequence. Missions end either by being completed, or by being aborted due to running out of "fuel", as indicated by the lights in the passage that passes under the launch ramp. The "fuel" lights go out one by one at a time interval, and can be re-lit by having the ball go over them, or all at once by going up the launch ramp again. Upon completing a mission, some of the blue lights in a circle in the middle of the table turn on. When all of the lights in the blue circle turn on, the player's rank increases, and a light in the orange circle turns on.

=== Skulduggery ===
Full Tilt! Skulduggery table

The Skulduggery table features a treasure hunt where the player must find pirate Peg Leg's loot. The player can accomplish that two ways: either by piecing together a treasure map or by activating and completing a series of mini-games on the table called modes. Modes are like missions and quests of the other two tables. They are all pirate themed mini-games, such as ship battle, tavern fight, escape Bermuda Triangle, mutiny, and sword fight.

=== Dragon's Keep ===
The Dragon's Keep table features a fantasy environment where players must accomplish various quests, leading to the slaying of a dragon. The quests include Dragon Hoard (steal the hoard), Fire Lizard Attack (defeat the fire-lizard), Rescue Maiden (rescue the damsel in distress), Dragon Pass (find the path to dragon's lair), Wizard's Fury, and Slay Dragon. The player can acquire awards such as spells, weapons, and armors. While weapons simply add points to the score, armors and spells temporarily turn on various gates, magnets, and chutes on the table to change the gameplay.

Elements from each of the three tables were elected for representation by Maxis in the illustration for the box art by Marc Ericksen, creating a montage below a hurtling Pinball.

== 3D Pinball for Windows – Space Cadet ==
3D Pinball for Windows – Space Cadet
- Space Cadet table, Windows XP version on top of Full Tilt! version
- Developers: Microsoft; Cinematronics
- Publishers: Microsoft; Maxis
- Platform: Windows
- Release: August 24, 1995
- Genre: Pinball
- Modes: Single-player, multiplayer

A version of the Space Cadet table, known as 3D Pinball for Windows – Space Cadet or simply Pinball, was bundled with Microsoft Windows. It was originally packaged with Microsoft Plus! 95 and later included in Windows NT 4.0, Windows 2000, Windows Me, and Windows XP. Windows XP was the last client release of Windows to include this game.

The look and feel of Full Tilt! Pinball and 3D Pinball are similar, with a few exceptions: The latter contains only the Space Cadet table and only supports 640×480-pixel resolution, while the former supports three different resolutions up to 1024×768 pixels. The image on the side is a two-dimensional image as opposed to pre-rendered 3D. The words "Maxis" and "Cinematronics" have been changed from the yellow to a dark red, making them harder to see. It sports a splash screen that merely says 3D Pinball and shows a small pinball graphic with faded edges. Music is not enabled by default in 3D Pinball. While it has two soundtracks named "PINBALL.mid" and "PINBALL2.mid" in the game files, only one of them is used. "PINBALL2.mid" is also unplayable in a media player.

There are only a few minor differences between the gameplay of the two versions. The completion of a mission in the Maxis version results in a replay—actually a ball save, rather than a special—being awarded. In addition, hitting a wormhole that has the same color light locks the ball, which if done repeatedly activates the multi-ball round. This is not the case in 3D Pinball: completing a mission merely awards bonus points and hitting a wormhole in the above circumstances awards a replay. Also, the three yellow lights above the bumpers (both in the launch ramp and in the upper table zone) act differently: in 3D Pinball these are turned off if the ball passes on them while they are on. This is not the case in the original game, where they just remain activated.

The Windows 98 installation CD has instructions on installing Pinball which are wrong, as they refer to a non-existent setup file called PINBALL.EXE on said CD; Microsoft later issued an updated support article, which refers to the (correct) PINBALL.INF file.

=== Discontinuation ===
According to Microsoft employee Raymond Chen, 3D Pinball for Windows – Space Cadet was first removed from later releases of Windows due to a collision detection bug during early development of 64-bit versions of Windows. Microsoft was unable to resolve the issue in time for the release of Windows XP 64-Bit Edition for the Itanium architecture in 2001, and it was assumed for some time to be the reason for the game's absence from Windows Vista and subsequent versions.

However, the 2005 release of Windows XP Professional x64 Edition includes an official 64-bit build of Pinball, which was found to have only minor graphical glitches. A YouTube investigation revealed working versions of 64-bit Pinball are also found on the CD-ROM for the 2003 update of Windows XP 64-Bit Edition and even in some early Windows Vista builds (then known as "Longhorn") for both IA-64 and x64. Chen clarified in a follow-up post that the 64-Bit Edition of Windows XP was developed on the Alpha AXP, as Itanium hardware did not exist at the time, and it was on this hardware that the collision bug was present. He theorized that the C runtime team or the compiler team fixed the issue at some point and Pinball was added back to the product.

The final versions of Windows to include the game were the first released builds after the reset of the Longhorn project to start over with a fresh codebase, now for x86 and x64 only. These builds are also the final ones to feature the other original Windows games from earlier versions, as opposed to the completely redesigned ones by Oberon Games that were publicly introduced in build 5219. This has led to speculation that, like the classic versions of the other games, Pinball was ultimately removed from Windows due to its visual style being considered outdated.

=== Revival efforts ===
In late 2018, Raymond Chen stated that there were multiple attempts to revive the game as a Microsoft Garage project. They were apparently successful in repackaging the x86 version, but as Microsoft contacted the legal department to review the original license contract, it was found that newer versions of the game were only permitted to be released pre-packaged with subsequent Windows operating systems and Microsoft Plus! packs. The license also forbade the release of the source code.

In the 2020s, a decompiling and reverse-engineering effort for the Space Cadet-only version of the game included with Windows led to numerous unofficial ported releases, allowing the game to be played natively on multiple computing platforms.

==== Physical version ====
Deeproot Pinball created a prototype of a physical machine using the layout of 3D Space Cadet, but were unable to secure a license for the theme and closed before a rethemed version was produced. Pinball designer Barry Oursler made the geometry and physics work on a full sized pinball machine.

== Sequel ==
Full Tilt! Pinball 2 is the sequel to Full Tilt! Pinball. It was released on October 31, 1996, with the introduction of three new tables: Mad Scientist, Alien Daze and Captain Hero.

== Reception ==
Reviewing the Windows version, a reviewer for Next Generation said that while the Space Cadet table is fairly good, the other two tables suffer from cluttered graphics and weak ball physics. He gave it two out of five stars. Todd Vaughn of PC Gamer gave it a score of 86%, praising the graphics and sound effects but criticizing the limited number of tables.

3D Pinball Space Cadet was cited to be among the computer games popularly played by school children in the Philippines in the 2000s, alongside Solitaire and Minesweeper. Tutorials showing how to install it on modern versions of Microsoft Windows have been published.

== In popular culture ==
In 2020, the sound effects of Space Cadet were sampled in Lil Uzi Vert's song "You Better Move". It garnered positive reactions from many fans who grew up playing the game.

Australian YouTuber CNCDan is currently constructing a real life model of Space Cadet, using 3D-printed mechanisms, motors, and solenoids.

== See also ==
- List of games included with Windows
