= Marble Drop =

1997 video game

- North American box art
- Developer: Maxis South
- Publisher: Maxis
- Platform: Windows
- Release: February 28, 1997
- Genre: Puzzle
- Mode: Single-player

Marble Drop is a puzzle video game published by Maxis on February 28, 1997.

== Gameplay ==
Players are given an initial set of marbles that are divided evenly into six colors: red, orange, yellow, green, blue, and purple, with two more colors available to purchase: black and silver (steel). These marbles are picked up and dropped by the players into funnels leading to a series of rails, switches, traps and other devices which grow more complex as the game progresses. The aim is to ensure that each marble arrives in the bin of the same color as the marble. Players must determine how the marble will travel through the puzzle, and how its journey will change the puzzle for the next marble. When a marble runs over certain sections of the puzzle, the paths may be rerouted or cut off, either temporarily or permanently. For example, if the marble runs over a button, it might hop, skip and jump a diversion that sends the next marble down a different road.

There are 50 puzzles in total, including five bonus puzzles which can only be accessed by solving a combination of locks which appear in certain puzzles. Each puzzle is decorated with da Vinci-style notes and sketches. These explanatory notes are a part of the background, informing the player of new pieces of equipment and their effects. At the end of each puzzle, the marbles that have been guided into their proper bins are returned to the player. Lost marbles must be purchased when they are needed to complete a puzzle. Steel (silver) balls are 20 percent of the price of colored marbles and can be used as test marbles or to help release a catch instead of using a valuable colored marble; additionally, there are steel-coloured exit bins in the final puzzle. Black marbles are very expensive, but change to the correct color when they arrive in a bin.

== Reception ==
Marble Drop

Review scores
Publication	Score
GameSpot	5.2/10
Computer Games Magazine	2.5/5

Marble Drop received lukewarm reception upon release. It received a ranking of 5.2 out of 10 from GameSpot, considering it dull. Computer Games Magazine gave it a 2.5 out of 5.
