= The Bull at Pinehurst Farms =

Golf course in Sheboygan Falls, Wisconsin

Coordinates: 43°42′48″N 87°48′46″W

- Interactive map of The Bull at Pinehurst Farms

Club information
- Location: Sheboygan Falls, Wisconsin, U.S.
- Established: 2003
- Type: Public
- Total holes: 18

The Bull at Pinehurst Farms
- Designed by: Jack Nicklaus
- Par: 72
- Length: 7329
- Course rating: 76.1
- Slope rating: 143

The Bull at Pinehurst Farms, often called simply just The Bull, is a Jack Nicklaus-designed golf course located in Sheboygan Falls, Wisconsin. It is the only golf course in the state of Wisconsin designed by Jack Nicklaus. The golf course has 18 holes and was built on the former Pinehurst dairy farm.

As of 2024, The Bull was consistently ranked in the top 100 best public golf courses in the United States and the top five in Wisconsin by Golf Digest, peaking at 70th nationally in 2015-16.

== Hole by Hole Tour ==
The first four holes at The Bull are relatively tame, but don't be fooled. This is a Jack Nicklaus design.

The first hole (named Copyright) plays 408 yards from the back tees. This straightaway par 4 is meant to ease you into your round.

The second hole (named Blueprint) is a dogleg right par 4 measuring 411 yards, and wraps around a pond to the right side of the fairway. The green is surrounded by a total of 5 bunkers, making for an accurate approach shot.

The third hole (Peerless) is a 217-yard par 3, similar in design to hole 5 at Pebble Beach (the 5th hole at Pebble Beach was also designed by Nicklaus). The same pond playing down the right side, the narrow green is also surrounded by challenging bunkers.

The fourth hole (Caravan) is a short par 5, measuring only 548 yards. Being able to carry your drive over the collection of bunkers to the left of the landing area will give players a legitimate chance at reaching the green in two. However, the smallest green at The Bull is surrounded by bunkers.

The fifth hole (Follow On) is one of the best holes in the entire state of Wisconsin. Playing at 432 yards from the back tees, this dogleg left par 4 is protected by a 40 foot deep ravine up the entire left side of the hole. Also, trees protect the right side of the fairway, demanding a very accurate tee shot and approach. This hole may very well be the signature hole at The Bull.

The sixth hole (Elation) is a downhill par 3 playing to 193 yards, with trees surrounding the hole on all sides.

The seventh hole (Starz) is the shortest par 4 on the course, measuring to just 321 yards from the back tees. Beginning at an elevated tee and ending at an elevated green, many players may take a crack at the green off of the tee, though the safer play is to hit a layup down the middle of the fairway and then a wedge onto the large green.

The eighth hole (Avant Garde) is a 568-yard par 5. After the tee shot over the Onion River, players have two choices. They can either play down the narrow right fairway and get to the green in two, or play down the wider left fairway and layup, and then hit a wedge into the green. Either way, the player will again have to cross the river before reaching the green.

The ninth hole (Dynasty) is an uphill par 4 back to the clubhouse measuring 453 yards. Usually playing into the wind, the approach shot can be very difficult.

The front nine plays to 3551 yards from the back tees.

The tenth hole (Renaissance) is a downhill par 4 playing to 469 yards. This dogleg right's green is protected by bunkers on both sides, as well as a pond to the right.

The eleventh hole (Medallian) is another short par 4, this being 357 yards. Players have three options off of the tee: drive the green, play it safe down the left fairway, or take a riskier shot down the right fairway in order to set up a much shorter and easier approach. The first and third options bring a pond into play, both requiring a long carry over it.

The twelfth hole (Primetime) is a long, downhill par 3. This 232-yard hole plays to a green surrounded by numerous bunkers.

The thirteenth hole (Escapade) is the longest hole on the course, measuring 581 yards. This par 5 has 12 bunkers, the most of any hole at The Bull. The difficult approach shot is to a large, elevated green.

The fourteenth hole (Cornerstone) is a long, difficult par 4 that measures 475 yards from the back tees. This dogleg right is guarded on the entire right side by the Onion River. The approach shot to the small green is also slightly uphill.

The fifteenth hole (Landmark) is the shortest hole on the course, playing to 182 yards from the back tees. With a pond guarding the left side of this par 3 and a bunker to the right of the green, the center of the green is the best option off of the tee.

The sixteenth hole (Payday) is an uphill par 4 measuring 425 yards. The approach shot plays across a deep ravine to a large green.

The seventeenth hole (High Life) is a 572-yard par 5. The tee shot plays over a ravine. The second shot layup plays downhill across the Onion River. The approach plays to an elevated green surrounded by bunkers.

The eighteenth hole at The Bull (Rock-n-Roll) is a long, demanding par 4, measuring to 485 yards from the back tees. This is one of the best finishing holes in Wisconsin. The tee shot requires a carry over a pond, and the approach plays to a small green nestled behind wetlands.

The back nine measures 3778 yards from the back tees.

From the back tees, The Bull measures 7329 yards, with a course rating of 76.1 and a slope rating of 143.

== Scorecard ==
The Bull at Pinehurst Farms
Tee	Rating/Slope	1	2	3	4	5	6	7	8	9	Out	10	11	12	13	14	15	16	17	18	In	Total
Bull	76.1 / 143	408	411	217	548	432	193	321	568	453	3551	469	357	232	581	475	182	425	572	485	3778	7329
Blue	74.1 / 139	398	382	209	493	404	183	293	562	417	3341	444	349	214	564	436	175	376	533	462	3553	6894
Green	72.0 / 133	365	364	189	481	388	173	281	556	407	3204	371	331	206	523	396	153	361	484	432	3251	6461
White	70.0 / 128	348	356	169	469	361	163	229	500	396	2991	362	320	169	509	382	137	340	419	365	3003	5994
Yellow	66.8 / 122	340	329	124	409	314	153	208	487	312	2676	310	309	155	429	296	105	278	413	315	2610	5286
SI	Men's	11	9	17	5	1	15	13	3	7		10	14	16	2	8	18	12	4	6
Par		4	4	3	5	4	3	4	5	4	36	4	4	3	5	4	3	4	5	4	36	72
Red	69.6 / 124	281	321	116	403	301	153	200	435	305	2515	305	267	148	422	290	98	273	374	309	2486	5001
SI	Women's	11	7	17	3	1	15	13	5	9		8	14	16	2	10	18	12	4	6
