= Nicklaus Design =

Golf course design and construction company

Nicklaus Design is a company, founded and run by American professional golfer Jack Nicklaus, that designs and constructs golf courses. As of Feb 2019, the company had designed over 410 golf courses and 57 more under development around the world. These courses include Harbour Town Golf Links, Hacienda Riquelme Golf Resort in south-east Spain, and Muirfield Village Golf Club in Dublin, Ohio, where the Memorial Tournament is played. Nicklaus Design is a family business, with Nicklaus's four sons and his son-in-law all involved with the company. As of 2008, the design team included Jim Lipe and Chris Cochran.

In November 2025, Nicklaus Companies filed for Chapter 11 bankruptcy after losing a $50 million defamation lawsuit against its founder, Jack Nicklaus. The company stated that the filing allows it to "proactively address its long-term funded indebtedness and other liabilities, as well as a jury verdict returned in a Florida state court last month following a lawsuit filed by company founder and former co-chair Jack Nicklaus.”

== See also ==
- List of golf courses designed by Jack Nicklaus
