= Hacienda Riquelme Golf Resort =

Golf resort in Murcia, Spain

Coordinates: 37.896985°N 0.970291°W

Hacienda Riquelme Golf Resort is a golf and leisure complex that opened in 2007. It is located between the mountains and the Mediterranean Sea, in south-east Spain and surrounds a manor house that dates to the mid nineteenth century.

== Geography and location ==
Hacienda Riquelme Golf Resort is located in a rural location between the foothills of the mountains of Sierra de Columbares and the village of Sucina. The area has been designated as part of the Carrascoy and El Valle Regional Natural Park.

As a means of water conservation, Hacienda Riquelme's playing surface has been grassed with Paspalum Vaginatum.

== History ==
Built in its current layout in approximately 1857, the main building is the manor house known as El Casón de Riquelme, which initially consisted of one story to which a series of secondary buildings were added surrounding an enclosed central patio, which was later to be divided into two: labourers' lodgings, stables, dovecots, water tanks, olive oil mills, barns, the use of which date back to the Roman Villas and Muslim hamlets.

The second half of the 20th century marked the decline of the Hacienda Riquelme. As a dryland farm, production was limited to a few olive trees, cereals, almonds and esparto, which was only profitable if it rained enough.

Polaris World bought the property and restored the buildings.

=== Resort information ===
The golf resort consists of 1864 apartments. The course is a par 72, 18-hole golf course designed by Nicklaus Design. It makes up one part of the GNK Golf Circuit (a collection of golf courses in the Región de Murcia), which includes:

- La Torre Golf Resort
- El Valle Golf Resort
- Condado de Alhama Golf Resort
