= Tres Marias Golf Club =

Golf course in Morelia, Michoacán, Mexico

Tres Marias Residential Golf Club
- Location within Mexico
- 19°42′29″N 101°6′28″W

Club information
- Location: Morelia, Michoacán, Mexico
- Established: 2002
- Tota holes: 27
- Tournaments: LPGA Corona Championship
- Designed by: Jack Nicklaus

Tres Marias Residential Golf Club is a 27-hole golf club and residence located in the city of Morelia which is situated in the Western State of Michoacán, Mexico. The Tres Marias Golf course was designed by American golfer and course designer Jack Nicklaus and built in 2002. The Tres Marias Residential Golf Club extends 550 hectares and is covered by a terrain of cliffs, lakes, and rivers. The name "Tres Marias" was given to the golf club as a result of the formation of three rocks in rock monoliths.

== History ==
In 2005, the Tres Marias Golf Club hosted the LPGA Corona Championship. The event was held every year from 2005 to 2010 at Tres Marias during the second week of April. Mexican golfer Lorena Ochoa won the LPGA Championship in 2006, 2008, 2009.

== Facilities ==
The Tres Marias Residential Golf club also serves as a gated housing community and security for Mexican nationals and foreign residents. The country club environment of Tres Marias has a club house with a semi-Olympic indoor and outdoor pool, a gym, spa, game room, Pilates and fitness room. There are also courts for volleyball, tennis, racquet ball, squash, basketball, and two soccer fields. A bike path of 9 km and 3 meters wide is also available for use by guests and members. There are three dining areas.

An equestrian club is also part of the Tres Marias facility and provides forty-three stables, two open tracks for obstacle practice, and one outdoor track with official dimensions.
