= Cinematronics, LLC =

American game developer

- Industry: Video game industry
- Founded: 1994; 32 years ago
- Founder: David Stafford, Mike Sandige, Kevin Gliner
- Defunct: 1997; 29 years ago
- Headquarters: Texas, United States
- Parent: Maxis (1996–1997)

Cinematronics, LLC, later known as Maxis South, was an American developer of computer games for the PC and Mac, based in Texas and founded in 1994 by David Stafford, Mike Sandige and Kevin Gliner. They developed Tritryst for Virgin Interactive, Full Tilt! Pinball for Maxis, and Jack Nicklaus 4 for Accolade. The Space Cadet pinball table from Full Tilt! was also included with Microsoft Plus 95 and several versions of Microsoft Windows.

== History ==
The company was founded in 1994 by David Stafford, Mike Sandige and Kevin Gliner. In 1996, the company was acquired by Maxis Software, Inc. and renamed Maxis South. As Maxis South, they developed games such as Marble Drop and an unreleased Diablo-type game called Crucible.

A year later, in June 1997, the entire company was acquired by Electronic Arts, Inc. for $125 million. Crucible, Remnants, and Nightfall - three titles in development from Maxis South have been canceled as a result.

=== Game credits ===
- Jack Nicklaus 4 (1997)
- Marble Drop (1997)
- Full Tilt! Pinball (1995)
- TriTryst (1995)
