= Red Ledges =

Community and golf course in Utah

Coordinates: 40°30′43″N 111°22′14″W

Red Ledges is a private community located in Heber City, Utah in the Heber Valley owned by Red Ledges Land Development Inc. It is home to the Jack Nicklaus Signature Golf Course, Cliff Drysdale Tennis Academy, and Jim McLean (golfer) Golf School. The development also includes a luxury master-planned community featuring approximately 200 completed homes, with an additional 100 homes currently under construction.

== Jack Nicklaus Signature Golf Course ==
Jack Nicklaus developed an ecologically-sensitive golf courses that take advantage of the topography of the land, the red rock cliffs, and the local cedar trees. The Red Ledges course has won several awards: 2010-2016 Utah Best of State - Best Golf Course, 2011-2012 Golfweek's Best Residential Course, and 2009 Golf Magazine's #1 Best New Private Course.

As well as this there is also a 12-hole short course designed by Jack Nicklaus.

== Cliff Drysdale Tennis Academy ==
This is the first high-altitude tennis school offered by US Open doubles champion and ESPN commentator, Cliff Drysdale. The academy focuses on drilling techniques and technical instruction. This academy includes indoor and outdoor clay courts.

This is the only Cliff Drysdale tennis academy on the West Coast and in Utah.

== Jim McLean Golf School ==
Red Ledges and Jim McLean built a golf school at Red Ledges, the first in Utah and one of seven in the United States. The Red Ledges Golf School also includes winter training facilities all located at the practice facility.

== Equestrian Center ==
The Red Ledges Equestrian Center features both indoor and outdoor riding arenas along with 400 acres (1.6 km^{2}) of open space for riding. It offers group and individual riding opportunities and features a full training facility available to members and their guests.
