= Muirfield Village =

Golf course residential community in Ohio

- Location within the United States Location within Ohio
- 40.1405°N 83.1414°W

Club information
- Location: Dublin, Ohio, U.S.
- Elevation: 910 feet (280 m)
- Established: 1974, 52 years ago
- Type: Private
- Total holes: 36
- Tournaments: Memorial Tournament (1976–present); U.S. Amateur (1992); Ryder Cup (1987); Solheim Cup (1998); Presidents Cup (2013); Workday Charity Open (2020)
- Greens: Bentgrass
- Fairways: Bentgrass
- Website: mvgc.org

Muirfield Village Golf Club
- Designed by: Jack Nicklaus
- Par: 72
- Length: 7,569 yd (6,921 m)
- Course rating: 77.3 (Memorial)
- Slope rating: 155
- Course record: 61 – John Huston (1996)

The Country Club at Muirfield Village
- Designed by: Jack Nicklaus
- Par: 72
- Length: 6,875 yd (6,286 m)
- Course rating: 72.3 (Blue)
- Slope rating: 131
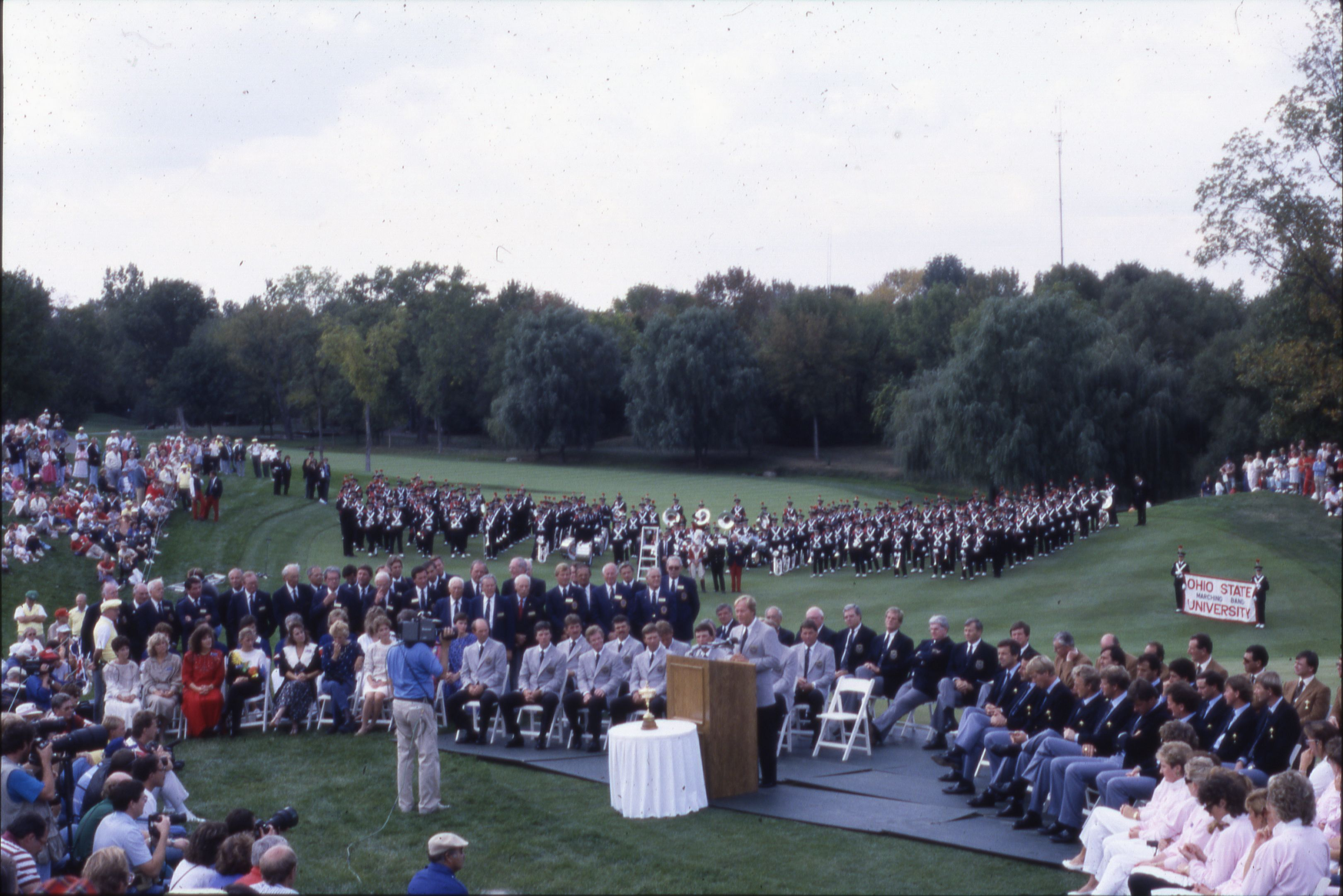
- Opening ceremonies for the 1987 Ryder Cup gold tournament on the 18th green.

Muirfield Village is a golf-oriented community in the central United States, located in Dublin, Ohio, a suburb north of Columbus.

== Origins ==
Founded by Jack Nicklaus, it is named after Muirfield, Scotland, where he won the first of his three Open titles in 1966 to complete the first of his three career grand slams. The village contains an eponymous golf course that hosts the Memorial Tournament, a PGA Tour event played each spring since its inception 50 years ago in 1976. A bronze sculpture of Nicklaus mentoring a young golfer, unveiled in 1999, is located in the wide median of Muirfield Drive.

Although the land for the Muirfield Village Golf Club was acquired in 1966, construction began six years later and the golf club officially opened in May 1974, the same year that homes began to be sold. Muirfield Village is one of the wealthiest and most notable neighborhoods in Central Ohio, and has been home to many local CEOs and celebrities including Jack Hanna, Urban Meyer, Bobby Rahal and many Columbus Blue Jackets players. The community master plan and site development was designed by Bassett Associates of Lima, Ohio.

The Muirfield Village Homeowners Association has a mandatory dues structure for the 2,400 homes that pays for landscaping and many amenities, including 2 swimming pools, multiple lighted tennis and pickleball courts, two splashpads, 2 children's playgrounds, a 14 acre nature preserve, 29 miles of pathways some of which go through tunnels under roads or on bridges over streams. It also has a free for residents walk-on 6 hole golf course complete with bunkers and a pond for a water hazard. Unveiled in 2026 is a new outdoor sculpture, S'Wing, modeled after both the iconic arc of Jack Nicklaus' golf "swing," and he arc of a bird's "wings" in flight.

== Golf courses ==
Two golf courses are located within Muirfield Village: The Country Club at Muirfield, which also has tennis and swimming, and the signature Muirfield Village Golf Club, where the Memorial Tournament is held annually. MVGC has also hosted several national championships and international team competitions, including the 1992 U.S. Amateur, 1987 Ryder Cup, the 1998 Solheim Cup, the 1986 U.S. Junior Amateur and the 2013 Presidents Cup. It and The Greenbrier in West Virginia are the only two US courses to have hosted both the Ryder and Solheim Cups. When asked whether he would be interested in captaining the U.S. squad in the matches on his home course, Jack Nicklaus responded that although he would enjoy it, he believes captains should be more "current" with the players on the team.

Muirfield Village Golf Club is controlled by Nicklaus, and he has regularly made changes to the course in order to accommodate new technology, make the course more enjoyable for members and tournament spectators, or simply offer a tougher test for the pros. In the 2010s, changes included lengthening several holes, including the first, tenth, twelfth, and seventeenth, adding bunkers, particularly at the tenth and seventeenth, and rerouting a stream on the eighteenth hole. In 2013, the eighteenth hole was lengthened by 40 yards. He also made changes to the driving range, added several suites overlooking the 18th hole, and completely remodeled the clubhouse inside and out. In 2014, Golf Digest rated Muirfield Village as the number one golf course in Ohio, and 53rd in the first-ever world's 100 greatest golf courses. Golf Digest also ranked Muirfield Village 14th in the United States in 2018.

MVGC closed and underwent a large renovation after the 2020 Memorial Tournament. Every green complex was redone, bunkers were enlarged and deepened, and some positions of greens were moved. The biggest changes were made on the fifth and fifteenth holes, and there were no changes made to the twelfth and fourteenth holes. Nicklaus called this renovation "his final bite at the apple", implying this would be the final major renovation in his lifetime.

Membership in MVGC is concentrated in Columbus and Ohio generally, however there is a substantial national and international membership as well. The club has sleeping quarters on the property for member use.

== Scorecard ==
Muirfield Village Golf Club
| Tee | Rating/Slope | 1 | 2 | 3 | 4 | 5 | 6 | 7 | 8 | 9 | Out | 10 | 11 | 12 | 13 | 14 | 15 | 16 | 17 | 18 | In | Total |
| 2025 Memorial | 77.3 / 155 | 490 | 459 | 382 | 210 | 547 | 455 | 582 | 200 | 417 | 3752 | 472 | 588 | 180 | 455 | 360 | 561 | 218 | 503 | 480 | 3817 | 7569 |
| Blue | 74.1 / 148 | 419 | 411 | 374 | 189 | 505 | 383 | 548 | 160 | 387 | 3376 | 423 | 522 | 160 | 405 | 336 | 491 | 175 | 428 | 423 | 3363 | 6739 |
| White | 72.0 / 143 | 388 | 399 | 366 | 162 | 473 | 372 | 518 | 136 | 366 | 3180 | 413 | 484 | 143 | 359 | 325 | 466 | 152 | 388 | 393 | 3123 | 6303 |
| Green | 71.1 / 142 | 378 | 369 | 364 | 160 | 461 | 357 | 510 | 130 | 356 | 3085 | 410 | 465 | 138 | 352 | 320 | 458 | 135 | 378 | 386 | 3042 | 6127 |
| SI | | 1 | 11 | 3 | 15 | 9 | 7 | 13 | 17 | 5 | | 2 | 14 | 12 | 10 | 18 | 16 | 8 | 6 | 4 |
| Par | | 4 | 4 | 4 | 3 | 5 | 4 | 5 | 3 | 4 | 36 | 4 | 5 | 3 | 4 | 4 | 5 | 3 | 4 | 4 | 36 | 72 |
| White | 77.7 / 148 | 388 | 399 | 366 | 162 | 473 | 372 | 518 | 136 | 366 | 3180 | 413 | 484 | 143 | 359 | 325 | 466 | 152 | 388 | 393 | 3123 | 6303 |
| Green | 76.7 / 144 | 378 | 369 | 364 | 160 | 461 | 357 | 510 | 130 | 356 | 3085 | 410 | 465 | 138 | 352 | 320 | 458 | 135 | 378 | 386 | 3042 | 6127 |
| Red | 73.5 / 135 | 366 | 359 | 327 | 138 | 384 | 352 | 487 | 118 | 303 | 2834 | 389 | 457 | 107 | 328 | 269 | 376 | 117 | 341 | 373 | 2757 | 5591 |
