= Intelligent Games =

British video game developer

Intelligent Games Ltd
- Formerly: The Intelligent Games Co. (1988–1993)
- Company type: Private
- Industry: Video games
- Founded: 1988; 37 years ago in Oxford, England
- Founder: Matthew Stibbe
- Defunct: December 2002
- Fate: Liquidation
- Headquarters: London, England
- Key people: Matthew Stibbe
- Products: Lego Loco
- Number of employees: 65 (1999)

Intelligent Games Ltd was a British video game developer based in London. The company was established in 1988 as The Intelligent Games Co. by Matthew Stibbe, who was studying at Pembroke College in Oxford. Following his graduation and the releases of 'Nam 1965–1975 and Imperium, Stibbe relocated to London in 1992, where he incorporated Intelligent Games in 1993. He hired Imperium producer Kevin Shrapnell as director of development, who aimed for the company to develop "hit-driven, brand-led" games, among them a series of PGA Tour games (initiated by Steve Cuss) and a tie-in to the film Waterworld. The latter attracted Westwood Studios, which worked with Intelligent Games on Dune 2000 (a remake of Dune II) and expansions for Command & Conquer: Red Alert. Relocating multiple times within London, Intelligent Games grew to 65 employees by 1999. That year, Westwood was unsuccessful in acquiring Intelligent Games but inspired Stibbe to want to leave the company. He sold it to Shrapnell, Cuss, and Neil Jones in June 2000 and departed that same year. Intelligent Games continued producing games, eventually eyeing the mobile and console markets, until running out of money in 2002. The company closed and all assets were liquidated in December 2002.

== History ==
Matthew Stibbe, a gaming enthusiast, created a Vietnam War-themed board game at age 18 during his final year of boarding school. After taking a year off, he enrolled at Pembroke College in Oxford. During his studies, Stibbe began designing a video game around his board game concept as 'Nam 1965–1975. The publisher Domark signed a publishing deal with Stibbe, who formally established The Intelligent Games Co. in 1988 and worked on the game in his spare time. He simultaneously began work on Imperium, a commission by Electronic Arts (EA), in 1989. EA assigned Nicholas Wilson as the programmer and Carl Cropley as the artist for the project, with Kevin Shrapnell acting as producer. The game was released in 1990. Stibbe finished 'Nam 1965–1975 by himself in 1991 while preparing for his finals and the game was released later that year.

Following his graduation, Stibbe and his company moved to a flat on Munro Terrace in London in 1992. Intelligent Games was incorporated as a limited company in the following year. Richard Evans, the company's lead graphic designer, was among the first hires following the incorporation. Stibbe and Evans worked on multiple game proposals that they would pitch to various publishers. While Evans created watercolour illustrations, Stibbe worked on the text and assembled the documents using Aldus PageMaker. These were printed with a Canon CLC 10 that the company was leasing for £100 per month. The process allowed for high-quality, coloured prints of the pitch documents, which Stibbe considered instrumental to the company's early success. Intelligent Games pitched Sim Rainforest and USS Ticonderoga: Life and Death on the High Seas, which Stibbe had drafted in 1992, to Maxis and Three-Sixty Pacific, respectively. Both companies signed publishing deals with Intelligent Games, which allowed Stibbe to open a proper office for the company and hire several programmers. As Stibbe realised that he was not good at people management, he hired Shrapnell as the director of development in 1993.

During the development of USS Ticonderoga, Three-Sixty Pacific faced financial difficulties and left Intelligent Games without payments for the game's production for six months. The project was eventually taken up by Mindscape and released in 1995. Sim Rainforest was released in the same year with the name SimIsle: Missions in the Rainforest. By this time, Intelligent Games had designed several new games, many of which were greenlit under Shrapnell's strategy of "hit-driven, brand-led" games, which aimed at creating games around existing brands, films, toys, or sports. Concepts like Dark Hermetic Order, Flying Circus, Bloodline, Conjure, King of Wall Street, Deadline News, and Cops and Robbers were scrapped. In 1996, during the development of Azrael's Tear, Steve Cuss programmed PGA European Tour. The arising publishing agreement led to several further PGA Tour games: PGA Tour: Laptop, PGA Tour 98, Tiger Woods 99 PGA Tour Golf, and Pro 18 World Tour Golf.

Intelligent Games was developing Waterworld, based on the film of the same name, by November 1995, at the time employing 25 people. The studio relocated to Kiln House on New King's Road in London in 1996 and the game was released in 1997. Although it was commercially unsuccessful, which was attributed to the film's poor reception, the game attracted Westwood Studios, which commissioned Intelligent Games to develop expansions for Command & Conquer: Red Alert. This led to the creation of Command & Conquer: Red Alert – Counterstrike and Command & Conquer: Red Alert – The Aftermath. Westwood Studios further requested that Intelligent Games develops a remake of Dune II, which became Dune 2000.

In 1998, Intelligent Games moved to IG House on Palliser Road in London. It employed 65 people in 1999. Westwood Studios offered to acquired Intelligent Games in 1999. Although the deal was not completed, Stibbe realised that he wanted to leave the company. Shrapnell, Cuss and Neil Jones subsequently approached him with an offer and Stibbe sold the company in June 2000, leaving it in the same year. Intelligent Games later developed F1 Manager, The Powerpuff Girls: Mojo Jojo's Pet Project, Tweenies: Game Time, Lego Stunt Rally, Emperor: Battle for Dune, 2002 FIFA World Cup, and three games in the Action Man series. A division for mobile games developed FlipDis for Palm OS and Intelligent Games formally began developing games for the GameCube, PlayStation, and Xbox in 2001, as well as for the PlayStation 2 in 2002. By that time, the company had run out of funds. Intelligent Games closed and all assets were liquidated in December 2002.

== Notable games ==
- Imperium (1990)
- PGA European Tour (1994)
- SimIsle: Missions in the Rainforest (1995)
- Azrael's Tear (1996)
- Command & Conquer: Red Alert - Counterstrike (1997)
- Command & Conquer: Red Alert - The Aftermath (1997)
- Waterworld (1997, PC)
- PGA Tour 98 (1997) (additional development)
- Tiger Woods 99 PGA Tour Golf (1998) (additional development)
- Dune 2000 (1998)
- Lego Loco (1998)
- Pro 18 World Tour Golf (1999)
- F1 Manager (2000)
- Lego Stunt Rally (2000)
- Tweenies: Game Time (2001)
- Emperor: Battle for Dune (2001)
- 2002 FIFA World Cup (2002)
