= TPC at Summerlin =

Golf club in Las Vegas

TPC Summerlin
- Location within the United States Location within Nevada
- 36.188°N 115.298°W

Club information
- Location: Las Vegas, Nevada
- Elevation: 2,700 feet (820 m)
- Established: 1991; 35 years ago
- Type: Private
- Operator: PGA Tour TPC Network
- Total holes: 18
- Tournaments: Shriners Hospitals for Children Open
- Website: tpc.com/summerlin
- Designed by: Bobby Weed
- Par: 71 (Shriners)
- Length: 7,255 yards (6,634 m)
- Course rating: 74.4 (Shriners)
- Slope rating: 137 (Shriners)

TPC at Summerlin is a private golf club in the western United States, located within the planned community of Summerlin in Las Vegas, Nevada.

Opened 35 years ago in 1991, the championship golf course was designed by Bobby Weed and is a member of the Tournament Players Club network operated by the PGA Tour. It hosts the tour's Shriners Hospitals for Children Open, formerly the Las Vegas Invitational, played in October. The average elevation of the course is approximately 2,700 feet (820 m) above sea level. The course was featured in PGA Tour Golf III and PGA Tour Golf 486, and was a base-game course in the PC versions of Tiger Woods 99 PGA Tour Golf, Tiger Woods PGA Tour 2000, and Tiger Woods PGA Tour 2001.

== Course layout ==
TPC Summerlin
Tee	Rating/Slope	1	2	3	4	5	6	7	8	9	Out	10	11	12	13	14	15	16	17	18	In	Total
Shriners	74.4/137	408	469	492	450	197	430	382	239	563	3630	420	448	442	606	168	341	560	196	444	3613	7255
Championship	72.4/131	395	424	473	429	187	407	345	203	550	3413	403	436	413	579	138	327	548	186	433	3463	6876
TPC	M:70.2/130 L:77.0/146	365	383	455	393	163	387	333	190	531	3200	368	415	384	542	119	310	536	161	368	3203	6403
Players	M:68.3/121 L:73.3/136	330	340	441	370	120	354	299	170	502	2926	324	377	345	530	114	288	484	154	358	2974	5900
Par		4	4	5	4	3	4	4	3	5	36	4	4	4	5	3	4	5	3	4	36	72
SI	Men's	11	5	7	3	13	1	9	15	17		4	2	8	14	18	16	10	12	6
SI	Ladies'	9	11	1	7	13	3	17	15	5		14	6	12	2	18	10	4	16	8
Forward	M:65.9/114 L:70.5/128	303	284	407	342	108	287	250	148	431	2560	293	347	328	508	93	275	460	125	350	2779	5339
Family		145	101	142	146	81	131	108	73	175	1102	122	143	114	167	77	85	155	96	122	1081	2183
