= EA Sports PGA Tour =

2023 video game

- Developer: EA Tiburon
- Publisher: EA Sports
- Series: PGA Tour
- Engine: Frostbite
- Platforms: PlayStation 5 Windows; Xbox Series X/S
- Release: April 7, 2023
- Genre: Sports
- Modes: Single-player, multiplayer

EA Sports PGA Tour, also called EA PGA Tour, is a sports video game developed by EA Tiburon and published by EA Sports for PlayStation 5, Windows and Xbox Series X/S. It is an entry in the EA Sports PGA Tour franchise, the first since 2015's Rory McIlroy PGA Tour. It is also the first in the series not to bear an athlete's name in the title since PGA Tour 98.

Initially taglined as Road to the Masters, it was later confirmed that the game was titled simply EA Sports PGA Tour, without a corresponding year, with the taglines periodically changing to reflect different major tournaments, while the Road to the Masters tagline remains in physical versions of the game.

== Gameplay ==
The game introduces several new features such as a new gameplay system called Pure Strike, which incorporates parts of a golf shot. It also features integration with ShotLink, the PGA Tour's statistics tool as well as TrackMan. Playable tour players will include Cameron Champ, Tony Finau, Nelly Korda, Hideki Matsuyama, Xander Schauffele, Scottie Scheffler, Jordan Spieth, Im Sung-jae and Lexi Thompson.

The game features 30 courses at release, including Augusta National Golf Club for the first time since Tiger Woods PGA Tour 14.

== Development ==
EA Sports PGA Tour was first announced in March 2021 Like its predecessor, the game runs on the Frostbite engine.

Originally scheduled for an early 2022 release to coincide with the 2022 Masters Tournament, the game was delayed multiple times for undisclosed reasons. It was released on April 7, 2023, coinciding with that year's Masters tournament (and being the same date as the second round), moved from the original date, March 24.

== Reception ==
Reception

Aggregate score
Aggregator	Score
Metacritic	(PC) 72/100 (PS5) 76/100 (XSXS) 74/100

Review scores
Publication	Score
Game Informer	6/10
GameSpot	7/10
Shacknews	7/10

According to the review aggregator Metacritic, the PlayStation 5 version of EA Sports PGA Tour received "generally favorable reviews", while the PC and Xbox Series X and S versions received "mixed or average reviews".

Gamespot wrote: "After almost a decade away from the sport, EA's return to the golf course is a promising one. The range of shot types, courses, and tangible variables make for a methodical and tactical game of golf that's both challenging and rewarding. It stumbles by barely introducing players to its robust mechanics, while a laggy swing and inconsistent putting are notable flaws on what is otherwise a fantastic golf sim. EA Sports PGA Tour represents a solid re-entry for the series and lays down a sturdy foundation for an auspicious future."
