= The Links at Spanish Bay =

Golf course in California, United States

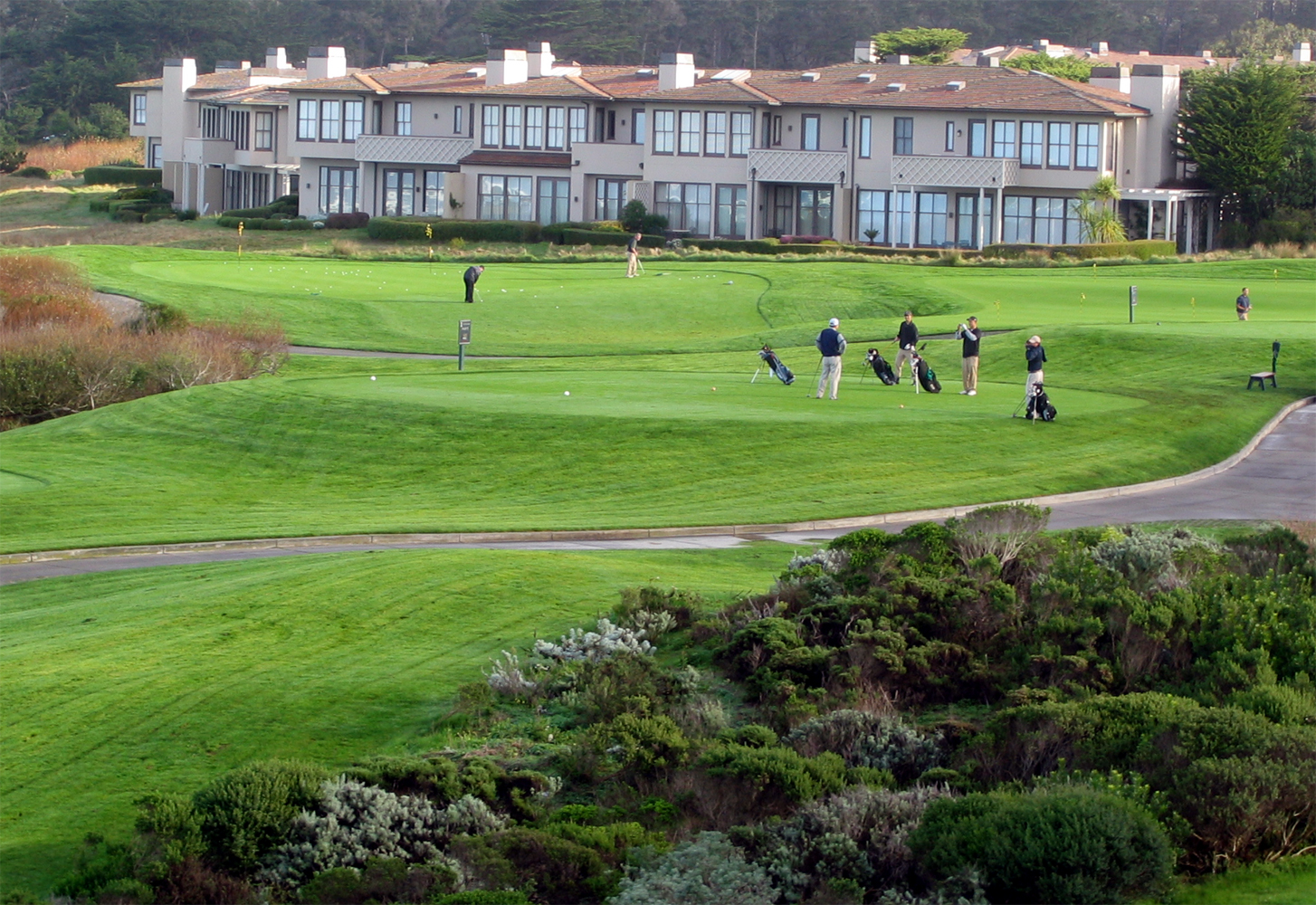
- Interactive map of The Links at Spanish Bay
- 36°36′48″N 121°56′25″W

Club information
- Location: Pebble Beach, California
- Established: 1987
- Type: Public
- Owner: Pebble Beach Company
- Operator: Pebble Beach Company
- Total holes: 18
- Website: Pebble Beach Resorts

The Links at Spanish Bay
- Designed by: Robert Trent Jones, Jr., Tom Watson, Sandy Tatum
- Par: 72
- Length: 6,821 yards (6,237 m)
- Course rating: 74.2
- Slope rating: 142

The Links at Spanish Bay is a golf course on California's Monterey Peninsula. It is part of the Pebble Beach Company, which also owns the Pebble Beach Golf Links, Spyglass Hill Golf Course, and the Del Monte Golf Course.

Spanish Bay was designed by Robert Trent Jones, Jr., Tom Watson, and Sandy Tatum, and opened in 1987. It resembles a British links course; Watson once remarked, "Spanish Bay is so much like Scotland, you can almost hear the bagpipes." Suitably, it was traditional for bagpipes to play to signal the course's closure for the day.

The course was released as add-on content for the PC versions of both PGA Tour 96 and Tiger Woods 99 PGA Tour Golf, the latter in a pack alongside fellow Monterey Peninsula courses Spyglass Hill and Poppy Hills.

In March 2026, the course closed for renovations.

== Layout ==
Hole	Yards	Par	Hole	Yards	Par
1	500	5	10	520	5
2	307	4	11	365	4
3	407	4	12	432	4
4	177	3	13	126	3
5	451	4	14	576	5
6	400	4	15	390	4
7	418	4	16	200	3
8	158	3	17	413	4
9	394	4	18	574	5
Out	3,225	35	In	3,596	37
			Total	6,821	72
