= Qualifying school =

Qualifying tournaments for leading golf tours

In professional golf, the term qualifying school is used for the annual qualifying tournaments for leading golf tours such as the U.S.-based PGA and LPGA Tours and the European Tour. A fixed number of players in the event win membership of the tour for the following season, otherwise known as a "tour card", meaning that they can play in most of the tour's events without having to qualify. They join the leaders on the previous year's money list/order of merit and certain other exempt players as members of the tour.

Getting through the qualifying school of an elite tour is very competitive and most professional golfers never achieve it. There can be up to four stages to negotiate, each of them like a regular golf tournament with only a small number of players going on to the next stage. The final qualifying school may be played over up to six rounds, compared with the standard four rounds in a professional golf tournament. However, players who are successful at qualifying school can reach the elite level of competition very quickly.

Some lower status tours are open to any registered professional who pays a membership fee so they do not have a qualifying school.

== Q-Schools ==
=== PGA Tour ===
The PGA Tour's qualifying school was officially known as the PGA Tour Qualifying Tournament, but the organization also frequently refers to it as "Q-School." The system began in 1965. The 2012 edition (the final Q School that offered a direct path to the PGA Tour) involved four stages:

- Pre-qualifying stage: Five tournaments held in September, all in warm-weather locations in the United States. Each is played over three rounds. This stage was introduced in 2006 with four tournaments (six in 2007, four in 2008). In each tournament, roughly 35 to 40 players, plus ties, advance to the next stage. Participants in this stage are former college players and mini-tour veterans who have never played in a PGA-sanctioned event or major international tour.
- First stage: Thirteen tournaments held in October (compared to 14 in 2005, before the introduction of pre-qualifying, 10 in 2006, 12 in 2007, and 11 in 2008), also in warm-weather locations in the United States. Each is played over four rounds. The participants are a mixture of pre-qualifying stage winners and players who were exempted from pre-qualifying. Roughly the top 25 players plus ties in each tournament advance.
  - Exempt into this stage: Members of international golf tours or Korn Ferry Tour over past five seasons, applicants ranked 101-200 in Official World Golf Ranking (OWGR) by deadline, those who played in a major over previous two seasons, Walker Cup members, top 20 in the World Amateur Golf Ranking, anyone who made the cut in a PGA Tour event.
- Second stage: Six tournaments in November, also in warm-weather locations and each played over four rounds. Like the First Stage, certain players receive exemptions to this stage. Roughly the top 20 plus ties in each tournament advance.
  - Exempt into second stage: 41-70 on Korn Ferry Tour money list, PGA Tour members, winners of Korn Ferry Tour events over past five seasons, applicants who made the cut in a major, applicants who have made 50 or more cuts on the PGA Tour, 51-100 in OWGR, top two available players from Asian Tour, Canadian Tour, PGA Tour Latinoamérica (formerly Tour de las Américas), or Sunshine Tour.
- Final stage: One tournament played over six rounds in late November-early December. The field consists of Second Stage winners and players who received exemptions into the Final Stage. The top 25 players, plus ties, earn PGA Tour cards for the following year. Their priority ranking for purposes of tournament entry is 24; this ranking enables them to enter most full-field events on the PGA Tour, but not more prestigious stops on the tour unless a substantial number of players in higher categories skip the events. For example, the top 125 players on the previous year's money list who are not otherwise eligible are at priority 19; sponsor's exemptions are priority 11; and winners of PGA Tour events in the previous two years are priority 9. The next 50 players plus ties after the top 25 earned fully exempt Korn Ferry Tour cards for the following year, and any remaining finishers receive conditional status on the Korn Ferry Tour.
  - Exempt through final stage: 126-150 on PGA Tour's money list, 26-40 on Korn Ferry Tour's money list, those with medical extensions, top three available players from European Tour and Japan Golf Tour, top 50 in OWGR.

A number of players who earned PGA Tour privileges through a Top 25 finish on the Korn Ferry Tour also played in the final stage in attempts to improve their status and order in the reshuffle. The reshuffle alternated between Q School and Korn Ferry Tour graduates, with higher-finishing players getting more priority in tournaments. The initial reshuffle began with the Q School medalist, then 2nd place on the Korn Ferry Tour money list (the money leader is fully exempt), second in Q School, and so on. The order would change according to season earnings after the eighth tournament of the season, the Masters, Players Championship, U.S. Open, and British Open, again with the highest earning players receiving higher priority into tournaments.

Korn Ferry Tour graduates did not count against the 25. If there were less than 25 after the Korn Ferry Tour graduates were discounted, then those in the next position were given PGA Tour cards, as in 2010 and 2011. In 2011, twenty-six golfers originally earned tour cards, which also included Korn Ferry Tour graduates Roberto Castro and Mark Anderson. As there were fewer than 25 after Castro and Anderson were not counted, Nathan Green, Colt Knost, and John Huh were also given Tour cards for 2012. Huh was the most successful of the three, winning at Mayakoba, playing in all four stages of the FedEx Cup, and finishing 28th on the money list en route to Rookie of the Year honors. Knost did well enough to keep his Tour privileges, while former PGA Tour winner Green finished outside the Top 150.

The 2012 Qualifying Tournament was the last to award PGA Tour privileges. The tour announced in March 2012 that after the end of the 2013 PGA Tour season in September of that year, the 2014 season will begin the following month, and future seasons will begin in October of the previous calendar year. As a result, from 2013 on, the Qualifying Tournament will only award privileges on the Korn Ferry Tour. New PGA Tour cards for the 2014 season and beyond will instead be awarded at the end of a four-tournament series, known as the Korn Ferry Tour Finals, in which the top 75 money winners on the Web.com Tour and non-exempt golfers placing between 126 and 200 on the FedEx Cup points list will be eligible. The top 25 on the Korn Ferry Tour money list heading into the Finals will receive PGA Tour cards, with the remaining 25 cards to be awarded based on money earned in the Finals. The Finals money list will determine the priority placing for all 50 card earners in the coming season, including those earning cards through the Korn Ferry Tour money list.

In 2015, Korn Ferry Tour Q School was reduced to a four-round event. In 2023, Q School allowed players to earn PGA Tour cards for the first time in a decade, giving cards to top five plus ties.

=== European Tour ===
The European Tour has a three-stage qualifying school:

- First Qualifying Stage: eight tournaments, held in various countries around Europe, each played over four rounds.
- Second Qualifying Stage: four tournaments, each of four rounds, at four different courses in Spain.
- Final Qualifying Stage: a single tournament played over six rounds at two courses in Spain.

The leading 30 players and ties at Final Qualifying receive category 11 membership of the European Tour, which entitles them to entry to a substantial number of European Tour events, but not to the more prestigious stops on the tour unless a large number of players in higher exemption categories miss those tournaments.

The leading 30 players also receive category 4 membership of the second tier Challenge Tour, with the remainder of those making the 72-hole cut being granted category 7 status, and those missing the cut, category 12. Any player not making it through to the final stage is able to take up category UR1 membership, with limited opportunities to participate in tournaments during the season.

=== LPGA Tour ===
The LPGA operates a qualifying school with two stages:

- Sectional Qualifying: Two tournaments played over four rounds, one in California and the other in Florida, held in September and October. These tournaments are scheduled so that they do not conflict, and golfers may enter one or both sectionals. The entry fee is $4000 for one sectional or $5000 for both. The top 30 players, plus ties, from each sectional advance.
- Final Qualifying Tournament: A single tournament held in late November-early December at the LPGA International in Daytona Beach, Florida, played over five rounds. No extra fee is charged for entry. The top 45 players, plus ties, receive Tournament Division Membership. Their priority position varies depending on their Q-School finish:
- The top 20 finishers receive Category 12 membership, which entitles them to entry in most full-field events apart from the more prestigious events. Note that this does not include ties—if the top-20 cut includes more than 20 golfers, the players tied for the last position go to a sudden-death playoff to reduce the qualifiers to exactly 20 players. They alternate with the golfers who finished between 81 and 90 on the previous year's LPGA money list.
- Finishers between 21 and 45 receive Category 17 membership.

=== PGA Tour Champions ===
The PGA Tour Champions, the PGA Tour's circuit for golfers age 50 and older, has its own "Q-School". As of 2011, it involves two stages:

- Regional Qualifying Stage: Three tournaments played over four rounds and held in late October, all in warm-weather locations in the United States. Each tournament has a field of roughly 78 players, with roughly 16 to 17 advancing to the final stage. Two alternates are also chosen at each site in case a qualifier is unable to make the final stage.
- Final Stage: One tournament played over four rounds in mid-November. The field consists of Regional Qualifying winners and players who received exemptions into the Final Stage. The top 30 players, plus ties, earn PGA Tour Champions cards for the following year. However, for most, this only provides entry into Monday qualifying—only the top five players, not including ties, are assured of entry into regular tour events, and only for the first half of the season. If necessary, a playoff is used to reduce the number of fully exempt players to five. Golfers who will turn 50 during the next PGA Tour Champions season are allowed to enter Q-School, although they will not be eligible to compete on the tour until their birth date. An example of this occurred at the 2012 Q-School, with two of the top five finishers having been born on June 13, 1963. Their exemptions were temporarily taken up by the sixth- and seventh-place finishers. Players 6th-12th are conditionally exempt. Those in the top thirty plus ties are given entry into all open-qualifying tournaments.
  - Exempt through final stage: Top five in the current year's Senior PGA Professional National Championship, top available player (no lower than fifth) on both the European Senior Tour and Japan Senior Tour Orders of Merit, all players not already exempt who are in the top 75 of either the current year's or all-time PGA Tour Champions money list. Also, since 2010, golfers who have either won an event or made 150 cuts on the regular PGA Tour are exempt to this stage for their first two seasons of PGA Tour Champions eligibility, as are former PGA Tour Champions winners for the first two seasons after losing their exemption for that tour.

== Other qualification methods ==
Other methods of getting onto an elite golf tour include:

- Finishing near the top of the money list/order of merit on the tour's official developmental tour, such as the Korn Ferry Tour for the PGA Tour, the Challenge Tour for the European Tour or the Epson Tour for the LPGA Tour.
- Winning a specified number of tournaments on the tour's official developmental tour may grant an exemption. For example, both the PGA Tour and European Tour grant a "performance promotion" — informally known as a "battlefield promotion" — to any player who wins three events on its developmental tour in a season. Such a player is exempt from qualifying on the higher tour for at least the remainder of that season; on the PGA Tour, the exemption runs for the entirety of the following season.
- Winning a tournament on the tour after gaining entry to it through its qualification event or as a sponsor's invitee. Tiger Woods secured his PGA Tour card by winning the Las Vegas Invitational in October 1996 as a sponsor's invitee, and went on to win another event two weeks later.
- Winning enough money on multiple events on the tour as a qualifier/sponsor's invitee to meet whatever criteria the tour may lay down for promotion to full membership. Even without his 1996 tournament wins, Woods would have earned his tour card by finishing in the top 125 on the 1996 money list, since he had three other top-5 finishes as a sponsor's invitee that season.
- Special categories for elite golfers: Most tours offer automatic memberships to golfers with outstanding achievements such as winning a recent major championship or making a recent Ryder Cup or Presidents Cup team.
