= PGA Tour Golf =

1990 video game

- Developer: Sterling Silver Software (Note: The Master System and Game Gear versions were released under the rebranded name Polygames.)
- Publishers: Electronic Arts; Tengen (SMS & Game Gear versions)
- Composer: Rob Hubbard
- Series: PGA Tour
- Platforms: MS-DOS, Sega Genesis/Mega Drive, Amiga, Macintosh, SNES, Master System, Game Gear
- Release: 1990: MS-DOS; NA: 1990; EU: 1990 Genesis/Mega Drive; NA: April 1991; EU: May 1991 Amiga; EU: 1991 Macintosh; NA: 1991 SNES; NA: March 1992 Master System; EU: November 1993 Game Gear; NA: 1994; EU: 1994
- Genre: Sports (golf)
- Modes: Single-player, multiplayer

PGA Tour Golf is a golf video game and the first in the PGA Tour game series. It was developed by Sterling Silver Software and released in 1990 for MS-DOS. It was initially published by Electronic Arts, which subsequently released versions of the game for Sega Genesis and Amiga in 1991, followed by a version for the SNES in 1992. By 1994, Tengen had published versions for Sega's Master System and Game Gear consoles. PGA Tour Golf received generally positive reviews for its realism, sound, and camera. Several critics considered the computer versions to be the best golf game available at the time of its release. It was followed by PGA Tour Golf II.

== Gameplay ==
PGA Tour Golf features three real golf courses: PGA West, TPC Avenel, and TPC Sawgrass. It also includes a fictional fourth course, Sterling Shores. Various game modes are featured, including Tournament, Driving, Putting, and Practice. In Tournament, the player competes against a total of 60 unseen players, whose statistics are displayed on a scoreboard. The player can watch a replay of any golf shot, and good shots are automatically replayed. The game includes variable wind conditions which affect where the ball will land.

Before starting each course, the player is given a three-dimensional view of the hole, and the camera pans from the hole to the player's starting position. To further aid the player, an overhead map of the course is shown before starting each hole and after each shot. Upon reaching the green, the player views the area as a three-dimensional contoured grid to study the uneven terrain for better putting. The player also receives advice from PGA golfers. The Amiga and Master System versions include a multiplayer option. A 1994 U.K. re-release of the Amiga version includes the three courses from PGA Tour Golf II, as well as three additional tournaments.

== Development and release ==
PGA Tour Golf was developed by American company Sterling Silver Software, and was initially published by Electronic Arts, which released the game for MS-DOS computers in July 1990. The following year, Electronic Arts released versions for Amiga and Sega Genesis (also known as the Mega Drive). The Genesis version was released in the U.S. in April 1991, followed by a U.K. release the next month. A Macintosh version had also been released in the U.S. by the end of 1991.

In March 1992, Electronics Arts published a U.S. version for the SNES. It was also released in the U.K. By 1994, Tengen had published versions for Sega's Game Gear and Master System consoles. The latter version is a conversion of the Genesis version, which was converted from the computer version. In the U.K., The Hit Squad published re-releases for the Amiga in 1994 and 1996, while a 1997 Amiga re-release was published in the U.K. by Guildhall.

The game's music was composed by Rob Hubbard.

== Reception ==
Reception

Review scores
| Publication | Score |
|---|---|
| ACE | 905/1000 (DOS) |
| AllGame | 3.5/5 (Genesis) |
| Computer and Video Games | 91/100 (Genesis/Amiga) |
| Amiga Action | 85% (Amiga) |
| Amiga Computing | 75% (Amiga) |
| Amiga Format | 90% (Amiga) |
| Amiga Power | 88% (Amiga) |
| Amiga User International | 94% (Amiga) |
| CU Amiga | 93% (Amiga) |
| The Games Machine | 84% (DOS) |
| Game Players | 60% (Game Gear) |
| .info | 4.5/5 (Amiga) |
| Mean Machines | 91% (Genesis); 88% (Master System) |
| N-Force | 80% (SNES) |
| The One | 92% (DOS/Amiga) |
| Raze | 87% (Genesis); 81% (Amiga) |
| Super Play | 60% (SNES) |
| VideoGames & Computer Entertainment | 7/10 (Genesis) |
| Zero | 92/100 (Amiga/DOS) |

The computer versions received positive reviews, with several critics considering it the best golf game available at the time of its release. The computer versions were mostly praised for their graphics and realism, including the ball movements and wind conditions. The sound was mostly praised across various platforms, as was the variety of options. The camera and various perspectives were also praised. The Amiga and Genesis versions received some praise for the fast loading times of each new screen. Amiga Action stated that PGA Tour Golf stood out from other golfing games with its various features, while concluding that it could appeal to non golf fans. Phil Campbell of Australian Commodore and Amiga Review believed the game was better than Mean 18, with superior graphics, improved views of the course, and more game options.

The One, reviewing the DOS version in 1990, stated that the game had a perfect balance of realism and simplistic gameplay. The One reviewed the Amiga version of PGA Tour Golf in 1991, giving it an overall score of 92%. They called it a "brilliant conversion" of the PC version, and further expressed that it "has retained the energy and playability of the original PC version." The One criticises the 'fly-by' feature as 'jerky', as well as the game's frequent disk-accessing, although noting that the latter can be disabled though settings, and expresses that these grievances cause "nothing major [to be] lost from the gameplay." The One praises PGA Tour Golf's sound effects and attention to detail, furthermore stating that "PGA Tour Golf is the best golf game currently available."

Sandra Foley of Amiga Computing stated that Electronic Arts "managed to come closer than any other to simulating actual golf." However, she criticized the lack of female golfers, the bland graphics, the minimal sounds, and the inclusion of "one of the worst loading tunes I've ever heard." Amiga User International praised the replay modes and considered the game superior to Leader Board, but criticized Hubbard's musical score as a "grating series of fanfares". Amiga Power considered the game easy and addictive, and called it a worthy successor to Leader Board, but noted that it did not introduce any new features among golfing video games. ACE praised the game and stated that it would appeal to experienced and inexperienced golf players.

Raze reviewed the Amiga and Genesis versions; their presentation was praised, but the Genesis version was considered superior for being easier. Mean Machines praised the Genesis version, including its multiplayer option. The magazine concluded that it was superior to Arnold Palmer Tournament Golf, and stated that it would appeal to golfers as well as people who normally would not purchase golf games. VideoGames & Computer Entertainment praised the realism of the Genesis version and considered it an impressive conversion of the computer version, while calling it a "thoroughly entertaining, challenging and complex golf simulation." However, the magazine criticized the graphics, considering them inferior to Arnold Palmer Tournament Golf. AllGame's Jonathan Sutyak praised the Genesis version for its realism, but felt that the graphics could be better. Reviewers for Electronic Gaming Monthly praised the sounds of the Genesis version but had varying opinions about the graphics;

Jonathan Davies, writing for the U.K. magazine Super Play, criticized the SNES version for its "horrible" colors, jerky camera scrolling, and unrealistic ball movements, but stated that it played as well as the computer versions and was enjoyable. Davies concluded that it was not the best SNES golf game but that it was a "reasonable stop-gap until something better makes it over to this country." N-Force considered the swing animation in the SNES version to be somewhat jerky, and stated that the swing control method was inconsistent and frustrating. The magazine criticized the bland graphics and minimal backgrounds, but praised the fast and smooth animation of the ball while it is in flight to the hole.

Mean Machines praised the Master System version, considering it the console's best golf game. The magazine stated that it played as good as other versions of the game, and considered it superior to the SNES version, although slow screen reanimation was criticized. GamePro stated that the Game Gear version mostly fulfilled its goal to provide good golfing on the console, but considered it an average game. The magazine criticized the minimal sounds and music, and stated that the courses looked too similar to each other. Game Players stated that the Game Gear version had relatively good graphics but poor gameplay, criticizing unpredictable and inaccurate shooting distances. The magazine stated that the Game Gear version was not as good as the Genesis version.

Mega, in its October 1992 issue, placed PGA Tour Golf at number 10 on its list of Top Mega Drive Games of All Time. In 1994, PC Gamer UK named PGA Tour Golf the 48th best computer game of all time. The editors wrote, "It may be old, but games as good as this deserve a look-in even ten years down the line".

=== Amiga re-releases ===
Reception

Review scores
| Publication | Score |
|---|---|
| Amiga Action | 91% |
| Amiga Computing | 75% |
| Amiga Format | 93% (1995); 80% (1996) |
| Amiga Power | 80% |
| CU Amiga | 47% (1995); 93% (1997) |
| The One | 91% |

Reviewers noted the outdated graphics of the Amiga re-releases, and some considered PGA European Tour to be a superior game. The One called the 1994 version a "superb" re-release that was "well overdue," and attributed the game's initial success to it being a "true" golf simulator. Stephen Bradley of Amiga Format praised the additional courses, and stated that while the graphics were not comparable to Nick Faldo's Championship Golf or the Links series, the game was still easy to play. Bradley concluded that PGA Tour Golf "remains one of the Amiga's most compelling and enduring games."

Amiga Power praised the gameplay options. Tony Dillon of CU Amiga stated that the game revolutionized computer golf upon its initial release, and that "while many of its contemporaries are far more sophisticated and even more playable, none have ever been as original." However, the magazine stated that the game had not aged well, and called its control method "clumsy and uncomfortable."

In 1996, Steve McGill of Amiga Format wrote that despite the dated graphics, PGA Tour Golf still had "timeless appeal". In 1997, Martin Davies of CU Amiga called the game an "essential buy for all golf and sports fans," praising the variety, easy gameplay, and lasting appeal. Amiga Computing also praised its easy gameplay.
