= CyberTiger =

1999 video game

- Developers: EA Redwood Shores (PS); Saffire (N64); Xantera (GBC)
- Publisher: Electronic Arts
- Composer: Don Veca
- Platforms: PlayStation, Nintendo 64, Game Boy Color
- Release: PlayStation: NA: October 28, 1999; UK: December 3, 1999; Nintendo 64: NA: March 8, 2000; PAL: May 5, 2000; Game Boy Color: NA: November 8, 2000; PAL: November 10, 2000
- Genre: Sports (Golf)
- Modes: Single-player, multiplayer

CyberTiger (also known as Cyber Tiger Woods Golf) is a 1999 sports game published by Electronic Arts for PlayStation, Nintendo 64 and Game Boy Color. Tiger Woods is the main opponent and is the best-rated player in the game.

== Gameplay ==
The main objective is to play in tournaments through each circuit and defeat Cyber Tiger and other golfers to win the championship as a professional in career mode. This is the first game to feature Tiger Woods as a character in video game other than Tiger Woods PGA Tour.

Players begin as either Tiger Woods or a created character on Spyglass Hill, the featured golf course in the game. After winning in the Career mode, players can unlock the other championship courses. The Career mode begins players as children, from which they may earn their way to adulthood. Players start off on the Junior Tour as young golfers playing in a one-round tournament. After that, players compete in three more tournaments. Winning any one of them allows players to go to the Amateur Tour, where they must win one of two events to qualify for the Pro Tour. After that, cash is awarded for winning.

CyberTiger includes Power-Up Balls which may give players an advantage or rescue them in desperate times. Balls include "superballs" that bounce on any terrain, and eyeballs that go straight during their flight. Other options include SuperDrive, hidden tricks, hidden golfers and power-ups. The game also introduces Tiger Control, which allows players to put spin (topspin and backspin) on the ball while it is in flight; real-time analog swing and ball control; and the ability to fade or draw. CyberTiger supports vibration feedback devices as well as analog control. In addition, two blocks of memory are required for saving and a Multi Tap compatible adapter is needed for play by up to four players.

== Reception ==
Reception

Aggregate score
Aggregator	Score		
Aggregator	GBC	N64	PS
GameRankings	60%	65%	65%

Review scores
Publication	Score		
Publication	GBC	N64	PS
AllGame	N/A	N/A	2.5/5
Electronic Gaming Monthly	N/A	5.17/10	5.5/10
Game Informer	N/A	7.25/10	7.25/10
GameFan	N/A	N/A	70%
GamePro	N/A	N/A	3.5/5
GameSpot	N/A	3.8/10	5.3/10
IGN	6/10	8.4/10	5.5/10
Nintendo Power	N/A	6.8/10	N/A
PlayStation Official Magazine – UK	N/A	N/A	1/10
Official U.S. PlayStation Magazine	N/A	N/A	4/5
PlayStation: The Official Magazine	N/A	N/A	3/5

The game received "mixed" reviews on all platforms according to the review aggregation website GameRankings.

== See also ==
- Tiger Woods PGA Tour 2000
