= GL Golf =

GL Golf 2.01 screenshot

GL Golf is a 3D Golf game based on OpenGL for macOS designed by Nuclear Nova Software. It mimics a golf game with such common items as 504 different holes, sand traps, lakes, trees, a driving range and various golf clubs. The current version is 2.33.

== Current Development ==
With over 55 updates, GL Golf has been actively developed since 2003. The users and developers share ideas through email and on the GL Golf forum.

== iPhone OS version ==
A slimmed down version of GL Golf is also available on iOS via the App Store.

== See also ==
- PGA Tour (video game series)
