= Tiger Woods PGA Tour 2000 =

1999 video game

- Developers: EA Redwood Shores (PS); Xantera (PC Expansion, GBC); Rainbow Studios (PC)
- Publisher: EA Sports
- Series: PGA Tour
- Platforms: PlayStation, Game Boy Color, Microsoft Windows
- Release: PlayStation: NA: December 1999; EU: January 30, 2000; Game Boy Color: NA: January 2000; EU: February 11, 2000; Microsoft Windows: EU: February 29, 2000; NA: March 7, 2000
- Genre: Sports
- Modes: Single-player, multiplayer

Tiger Woods PGA Tour 2000 is a sports video game developed by EA Redwood Shores for the PlayStation version, Xantera for the Game Boy Color version and Rainbow Studios for the Microsoft Windows version and published by EA Sports for PlayStation in 1999 and Game Boy Color and Microsoft Windows in 2000.

== Expansion ==
A three-course expansion pack for the Windows version of the game, titled Buick PGA Tour Courses, was released on July 6, 2000. The expansion pack was developed by Xantera. The pack included Callaway Gardens, Torrey Pines Golf Course, and Warwick Hills Golf and Country Club. The pack was also compatible with Tiger Woods 99 PGA Tour Golf.

== Reception ==
Reception

Aggregate score
Aggregator	Score		
Aggregator	GBC	PC	PS
GameRankings	66%	67%	72%

Review scores
Publication	Score		
Publication	GBC	PC	PS
AllGame	2/5	4.5/5	3.5/5
Game Informer	N/A	N/A	7.5/10
GamePro	N/A	2.5/5	4.5/5
GameSpot	N/A	7.1/10	5.5/10
GameZone	N/A	4/10	N/A
IGN	3/10	N/A	6/10
Nintendo Power	6.6/10	N/A	N/A
PC Gamer (US)	N/A	48%	N/A
PC Zone	N/A	77%	N/A

The game received "mixed or average" reviews on all platforms according to video game review aggregator GameRankings.

PGA Tour 2000's computer version received a "Silver" sales award from the Entertainment and Leisure Software Publishers Association (ELSPA), indicating sales of at least 100,000 copies in the United Kingdom.

== See also ==
- CyberTiger
