= Waterworld video games =

Video games based on Waterworld

Several video games based on the 1995 film Waterworld have been released for the Super Nintendo Entertainment System, Genesis, Virtual Boy, MS-DOS, Microsoft Windows and Game Boy, along with unpublished versions for the Sega Saturn, Atari Jaguar, 3DO and PlayStation. These games were produced by Ocean Software. The SNES and Game Boy games were released only in Europe in 1995, the Virtual Boy game was released exclusively in North America in November 1995, and the Genesis version was only available via the Sega Channel service in March 1996. A strategy game for Windows was released in 1997.

== Versions ==
=== Super NES ===
Waterworld for Super NES was released in 1995 in Europe by Ocean Software. It was only released in PAL territories, but an NTSC version had been scheduled for release in December 1995, and given a lengthy preview in that month's issue of Nintendo Power.

The game is played from an overhead/isometric perspective with the player controlling the Mariner's boat on the ocean. The point of the game was to destroy the Smokers' boats and dive for sunken artifacts, at which point the game switches to a side on perspective so that the player can directly control the Mariner underwater.

=== Game Boy ===
The Game Boy version is a side-scrolling platform game, released in PAL regions in 1995. As with the SNES version, this too was planned to be released in North America in December, receiving a short preview in Nintendo Power.

The player controls the Mariner, where levels take place both underwater and on land. The Mariner can run, crawl, jump, and swing across stage elements, as well as use a gun to defeat enemies. Additionally, there are isometric sections where he must sail on his trimaran, avoiding mines and shooting at Smokers.

=== Genesis ===
A Sega Genesis port of the Super NES version was also produced by Ocean. The game never received a retail release, instead only being available through the Sega Channel subscription service for a few months beginning in March 1996. The Sega Channel ROM was later recovered by the Video Game History Foundation in 2025, as part of their efforts to archive Sega Channel games and information.

=== PC ===
In April 1995, Interplay Entertainment announced that they had garnered the rights to make a Waterworld game. The game was developed by Intelligent Games and published by Interplay. It was released for MS-DOS and Microsoft Windows personal computers in 1997. It is a real-time strategy video game. The game contains 25 missions. In the game, players play as a War Chief and lead a taskforce of 2 to 14 men depending upon the mission. The main objective of the game is to amass enough hydro (fresh water), food, weapons, and critical information to successfully evade the "Smokers" and revert the inundated world to its former glory.

== Cancelled games ==
=== Saturn ===
The cancelled Sega Saturn version of the game was to feature a 3D virtual ocean with a dynamic surface. It began development in late 1994.

=== Jaguar ===
The cancelled Atari Jaguar version was announced in early 1995 and planned to be released in the same year.

=== 3DO ===
The 3DO version was announced in 1995 and planned to be published by Interplay.

== Reception ==
All Waterworld games received predominantly negative reviews. GameSpot gave the PC version a review score of 4.5/10. The SNES version was also poorly received, but has been praised for its soundtrack. French magazine Consoles + considered the Game Boy version to be the best, scoring it an 83% and praising its graphics and gameplay while criticizing its music.
