= TPC Prestancia =

Club information
- Location: Sarasota, Florida, United States
- Established: 1985
- Type: Private
- Owner: Heritage Golf Group
- Operator: Heritage Golf Group
- Tota holes: 36
- Tournaments: Chrysler Cup (1987–94), American Express Invitational (1996–2000)
- Website: www.tpcprestancia.com

Stadium Course
- Designed by: Ron Garl
- Par: 72
- Length: 6,941 yards

Club Course
- Designed by: Robert Von Hagge
- Par: 72
- Length: 6,593 yards

TPC Prestancia is a private golf club located in Sarasota, Florida located in the Palmer Ranch community.

The club is a member of the Tournament Players Club network operated by the PGA Tour, and features two golf courses over 565 acres. Created by the PGA TOUR in 1985, The Stadium Course was designed by Ron Garl in consultation with Mike Souchak, and the Players Course, designed by Robert Von Hagge in consultation with Bruce Devlin . In 2007, the facility was sold to the Heritage Golf Group, but retained its TPC branding under a licensing agreement.

TPC Prestancia hosted the Chrysler Cup from 1987 to 1994, and the American Express Invitational from 1996 to 2000, both tournaments on the Senior PGA Tour.
