= TPC Treviso Bay =

Private golf club in Naples, Florida, USA

Club information
- Location: Naples, Florida, United States
- Established: 2008
- Type: Semi-Private
- Operator: PGA Tour TPC Network
- Tota holes: 18
- Tournaments: The ACE Group Classic
- Website: www.tpcattrevisobay.com
- Designed by: Arthur Hills
- Par: 72
- Length: 7,367 yards

TPC Treviso Bay is a private golf club located within the gated community of Treviso Bay in Naples, Florida.

The 18-hole championship golf course was designed by Arthur Hills in consultation with Hal Sutton. It opened in 2008 and is a member of the Tournament Players Club network operated by the PGA Tour. In 2009 it was the venue for the annual The ACE Group Classic, a tournament on the Champions Tour.
