= TPC Tampa Bay =

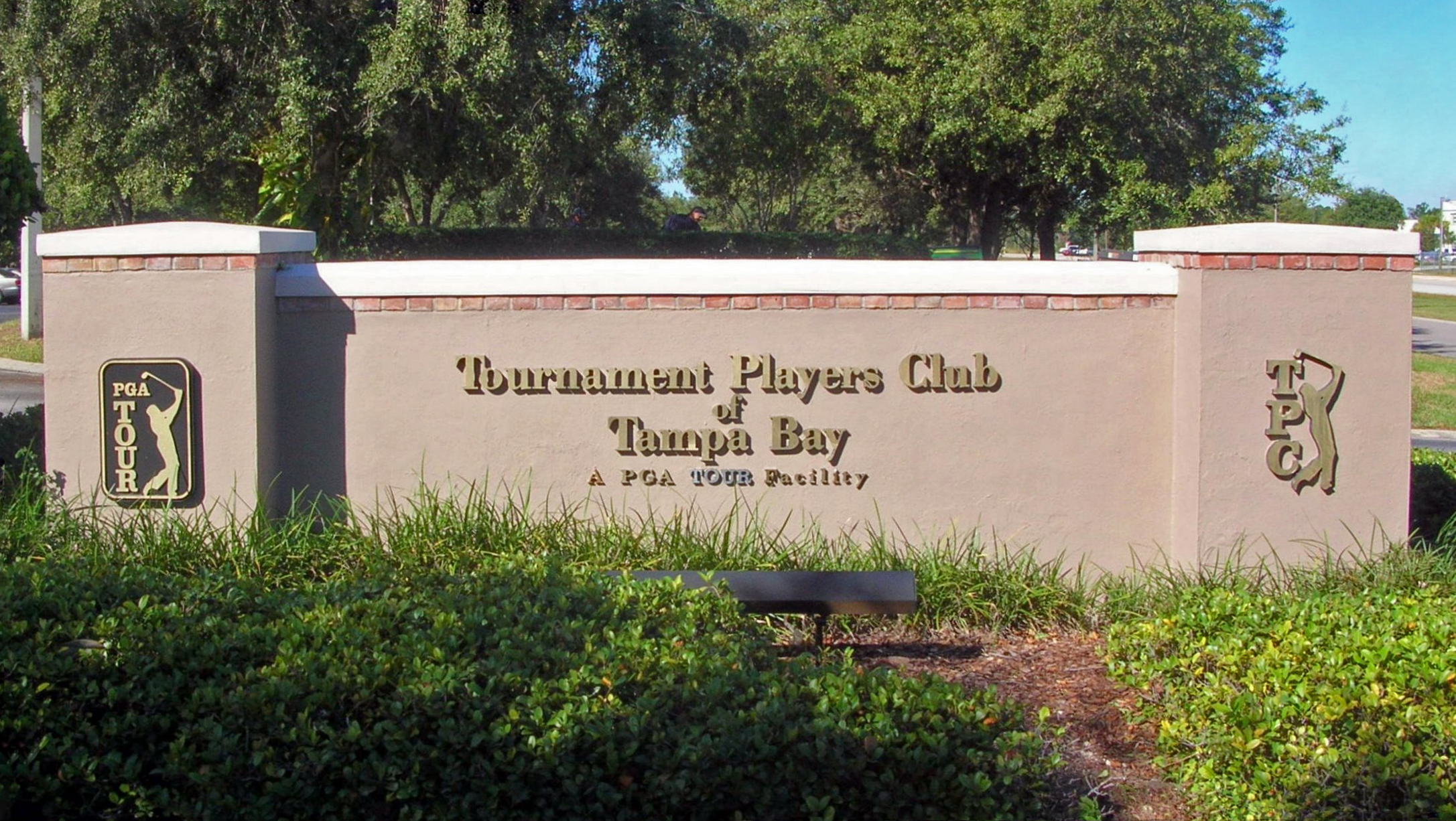

Club information
- Location: Lutz, Florida, United States
- Established: 1991
- Type: Public
- Owner: Heritage Golf Group
- Operator: Heritage Golf Group
- Tota holes: 18
- Tournaments: Encompass Insurance Pro-Am of Tampa Bay
- Website: www.tpctampabay.com
- Designed by: Bobby Weed, Chi Chi Rodriguez
- Par: 71
- Length: 6,898 yards

TPC Tampa Bay is an 18-hole golf course located in Lutz, Florida.

Opened in 1991, TPC Tampa Bay was designed by Bobby Weed in consultation with tour professional Chi Chi Rodriguez and is part of the Tournament Players Club network operated by the PGA Tour. In February 2008, the facility was sold to the Heritage Golf Group, but retained its TPC branding under a licensing agreement.

== Golf ==
TPC Tampa Bay was the venue for the annual Encompass Insurance Pro-Am of Tampa Bay, an event on the Champions Tour. TPC Tampa Bay has won numerous awards and continues to garner praise and rave reviews. 2016 Justin Wink - West Central PGA Chapter Merchandiser of the Year - PGA of America 2016 Justin Wink - North Florida PGA Chapter Merchandiser of the Year - PGA of America 2014 Top 50 Public Ranges - Golf Range Magazine 2012 100 Best Golf Shops - GolfWorld 2011 Justin Wink - West Central PGA Chapter Merchandiser of the Year - PGA of America 2011 100 Best Golf Shops - GolfWorld 2009 Readers Choice Awards (#13) GolfWorld Magazine's Readers Choice Poll.

2005 - 2008 Environmental Leadership in Golf Award - Golf Digest and the GCSAA

== Cuisine ==
In 2015, TPC Tampa Bay opened up a new modern restaurant called ¡CUATRO. The inspiration for ¡CUATRO not only came from the word "Fore!" shouted across the TPC Tampa Bay golf course (which provides the restaurant's lush backdrop), but also from the four culinary influences Chefs Michael Toscano and Wes Morton bring from their own family tables: Mexican, Italian, Cajun and American home cooking. Chef Michael Toscano has been recognized as a James Beard "Rising Star Chef" Semi-Finalist and winner of the StarChefs.com "New York Rising Stars Award". ¡CUATRO is open to the public 7 days a week for breakfast, lunch, and dinner.
