= University Club of Kentucky =

Semi-private golf course privately licensed by University of Kentucky

Coordinates: 38.1161°N 84.6104°W

The University Club of Kentucky, located in Lexington, Kentucky, is a semi-private golf course privately licensed by University of Kentucky. The course is the official home of the university's men's and women's golf teams and serves as the host site for all of UK's tournaments.

The current setup was designed by famed golf course architect Arthur Hills. The facility consists of two separate eighteen hole courses (thirty-six in total). Featuring the Big Blue Course (72-par, 7,018 yards) and the Wildcat Course (72-par, 6,680 yards), these landscapes are complemented by a dozen lakes and ponds, providing players with a beautiful and challenging round of golf.
