= Arthur Hills =

American golf course designer (1930–2021)

- Born: 1930; Toledo, Ohio, U.S.
- Died: May 18, 2021 (aged 91); Sylvania, Ohio, U.S.
- Education: University of Michigan (BS); Michigan State University (BLA)
- Occupation: Architect
- Projects: Bonita Bay (Naples, Florida); The Golf Club of Georgia (Alpharetta, Georgia); Bighorn Golf Club (Palm Desert, California); The Champions (Lexington, Kentucky); Wolfdancer Golf Club (Lost Pines, Texas)

Arthur Hills (1930 – May 18, 2021) was an American golf course designer. He designed more than 200 new golf courses, including private, resort, upscale, and public golf courses around the world. In addition, Arthur Hills' firm, Arthur Hills/Steve Forrest and Associates, has been requested to renovate or modify more than 120 courses, including some of the country's most renowned clubs, often in preparation for major USGA and PGA Championships.

== Early life and education ==
Hills was born in 1930 in Toledo, Ohio. He attended Michigan State University, where he earned a Bachelor of Landscape Architecture (Agronomy) in 1953 and a Bachelor of Science from the University of Michigan.

== Career ==
Hills designed his first golf course in 1967: the course was Brandywine Country Club in Toledo, Ohio. Hills stated that his main goal when designing a golf course was to make it playable for everyone of every skill level. Hills designed golf courses in Portugal (2001), Croatia (2012), and Sweden.

Hills later served as chief designer for Arthur Hills/Steve Forrest and Associates. Much of the work that he performed was redesigning golf courses.

== Courses designed ==
The following is a partial list of courses designed by Arthur Hills:

- OD denotes courses for which Hills is the original designer
- R denotes courses reconstructed by Hills
- A denotes courses for which Hills made substantial additions
- E denotes courses that Hills examined and on the construction of which he consulted

Name	Contribution	Year built	City / Town	State / Province	Country	Comments
Heritage Highlands G&CC	OD	1997	Tucson	Arizona	United States	New private 18 holes
Palm Valley GC	OD	1993	Phoenix	Arizona	United States	New public 18 holes
San Ignacio GC	OD	1989	Green Valley	Arizona	United States	New public 18 holes
Bighorn GC (Mountains Course)	OD		Palm Desert	California	United States	
Black Gold GC	OD		Yorba Linda	California	United States	
CrossCreek GC	OD		Temecula	California	United States	
Half Moon Bay Golf Links (Ocean Course)	OD		Half Moon Bay	California	United States	
Journey at Pechanga	OD		Temecula	California	United States	
Glacier Club (Valley Course)	OD		Durango	Colorado	United States	
Heritage Eagle Bend GC	OD		Aurora	Colorado	United States	
Legacy Ridge GC	OD		Westminster	Colorado	United States	
Walking Stick GC	OD		Pueblo	Colorado	United States	
Heritage Shores	OD		Bridgeville	Delaware	United States	
Plantation Lakes G&CC	OD		Millsboro	Delaware	United States	
White Clay Creek CC	OD		Wilmington	Delaware	United States	
American GC	OD		Vero Beach	Florida	United States	
Club Pelican Bay	OD		Naples	Florida	United States	
Colliers Reserve	OD		Naples	Florida	United States	
Coral Oaks GC	OD		Cape Coral	Florida	United States	
CC at Mirasol	OD		Palm Beach Gardens	Florida	United States	
Deer Creek GC	OD		Deerfield Beach	Florida	United States	
Fiddler's Creek	OD		Naples	Florida	United States	
Forest Glen G&CC	OD		Naples	Florida	United States	
FoxFire CC	OD		Naples	Florida	United States	
Heron Creek GC	OD		North Port	Florida	United States	
LPGA International Legends	OD		Daytona Beach	Florida	United States	
Miami Beach GC	OD		Miami Beach	Florida	United States	
Miromar Lakes Beach and GC	OD		Miromar Lakes	Florida	United States	Signature golf course
Myerlee CC	OD	1972	Fort Myers	Florida	United States	Top 100 golf
Palencia Club	OD		St. Augustine	Florida	United States	
Palmetto-Pine CC	OD		Cape Coral	Florida	United States	
Quail Creek CC	OD		Naples	Florida	United States	
River Strand G&CC	OD		Bradenton	Florida	United States	
Stoneybrook at Palmer Ranch	OD		Sarasota	Florida	United States	
Stoneybrook G&CC of Sarasota	OD		Sarasota	Florida	United States	
Stoneybrook West GC	OD		Winter Garden	Florida	United States	
Tampa Palms G&CC	OD		Tampa	Florida	United States	
The GC at Cypress Head	OD		Port Orange	Florida	United States	
The Groves Course	OD		Sarasota	Florida	United States	The Meadows CC
The Preserve at Ironhorse	OD		West Palm Beach	Florida	United States	
The Sanctuary GC	OD		Sanibel Island	Florida	United States	
TPC Treviso Bay	OD		Naples	Florida	United States	
Vista Plantation	OD		Vero Beach	Florida	United States	
Wilderness CC	OD		Naples	Florida	United States	
Olde Atlanta GC	OD		Suwanee	Georgia	United States	
The GC of Georgia	OD		Alpharetta	Georgia	United States	
The Standard Club	OD		Johns Creek	Georgia	United States	
Towne Lake Hills GC	OD		Woodstock	Georgia	United States	
The Hawthorns G&CC	OD		Fishers	Indiana	United States	
Bolingbrook GC	OD		Bolingbrook	Illinois	United States	
Chicago Highlands	OD		Westchester	Illinois	United States	
Stonewall Orchard GC	OD		Grayslake	Illinois	United States	
Ivanhoe Club	R		Ivanhoe	Illinois	United States	
Tallgrass CC	OD		Wichita	Kansas	United States	
Champion Trace GC	OD		Nicholasville	Kentucky	United States	
Persimmon Ridge	OD		Louisville	Kentucky	United States	
University Club of Kentucky	OD		Lexington	Kentucky	United States	
Blue Mash GC	OD		Olney	Maryland	United States	
Manor CC	OD		Rockville	Maryland	United States	
Maryland National GC	OD		Middletown	Maryland	United States	
River Downs GC	OD		Finksburg	Maryland	United States	
The Links at Lighthouse Sound	OD		Bishopville	Maryland	United States	
Waverly Woods GC	OD		Marriottsville	Maryland	United States	
Woodmont CC	OD		Rockville	Maryland	United States	
Bay Harbor Golf Club	OD		Bay Harbor	Michigan	United States	27 holes
Double JJ Resort	OD		Rothbury	Michigan	United States	
Egypt Valley CC	OD		Ada	Michigan	United States	
Fieldstone GC	OD		Auburn Hills	Michigan	United States	
Fox Hills GC	OD		Plymouth	Michigan	United States	
Giant Oaks GC	OD	1969	Temperance	Michigan	United States	Top 100 golf
Glacier Club GC	OD		Washington	Michigan	United States	
HawksHead Links	OD		South Haven	Michigan	United States	
Lakes of Taylor GC	OD		Taylor	Michigan	United States	
Leslie Park GC	R		Ann Arbor	Michigan	United States	Voted Michigan's Best Municipal Course by Golf Digest
Lyon Oaks GC	OD		Wixom	Michigan	United States	
Mill Race GC	OD		Jonesville	Michigan	United States	
Oakhurst G&CC	OD		Clarkston	Michigan	United States	
Pheasant Run GC	OD		Canton Twp	Michigan	United States	
Pine Trace GC	OD		Rochester Hills	Michigan	United States	
Red Hawk GC	OD		East Tawas	Michigan	United States	
Shepherd's Hollow	OD		Clarkston	Michigan	United States	
Stonebridge Golf Club	OD		Ann Arbor	Michigan	United States	Public 18-holes. Ranked Top 10 Public Golf Course in Metro Detroit, August 2022
The Arthur Hills Course at the Boyne Highlands Resort	OD		Harbor Springs	Michigan	United States	
The Legacy GC	OD		Ottawa Lake	Michigan	United States	
The Moors GC	OD		Portage	Michigan	United States	
Walnut Creek CC North Nine	OD		South Lyon	Michigan	United States	
Chaska Town Course	OD		Chaska	Minnesota	United States	a top rated 18-hole municipal course
Peveley Farms GC	OD		Eureka	Missouri	United States	
The Legacy GC	OD		Henderson	Nevada	United States	
Country Club of North Carolina Dogwood	R	1963	Pinehurst	North Carolina	United States	
Country Club of North Carolina Cardinal	R	1970	Pinehurst	North Carolina	United States	
Belmont CC	OD		Perrysburg	Ohio	United States	
Brandywine CC	OD		Maumee	Ohio	United States	
Brookledge GC	OD		Cuyahoga Falls	Ohio	United States	
Catawba Island Club	OD		Port Clinton	Ohio	United States	
Detwiler Park GC	OD		Toledo	Ohio	United States	
Inverness Club	R		Toledo	Ohio	United States	
Kinsale Golf and Fitness Club	OD		Powell	Ohio	United States	Signature course
Legendary Run GC	OD		Cincinnati	Ohio	United States	
Maumee Bay GC	OD		Oregon	Ohio	United States	
Pipestone GC	OD		Miamisburg	Ohio	United States	
Red Hawk Run GC	OD		Findlay	Ohio	United States	
Shaker Run GC	OD		Lebanon	Ohio	United States	
Stone Ridge GC	OD		Bowling Green	Ohio	United States	
The Virtues GC (Longaberger GC)	OD		Nashport	Ohio	United States	
Turnberry GC	OD		Pickerington	Ohio	United States	
Weatherwax GC	OD		Middletown	Ohio	United States	
Wetherington CC	OD		West Chester	Ohio	United States	
Rose Creek GC	OD		Edmond	Oklahoma	United States	
Colonial Golf & Tennis Club	R		Harrisburg	Pennsylvania	United States	
Regents Glen CC	OD		York	Pennsylvania	United States	
Arthur Hills GC	OD		Hilton Head Island	South Carolina	United States	
Cedar Creek GC	OD		Aiken	South Carolina	United States	
Coosaw Creek Course	OD		North Charleston	South Carolina	United States	
Dunes West Golf & River Club	OD	1991	Mount Pleasant	South Carolina	United States	
River Island GC	OD		Kodak	Tennessee	United States	Now known as Island Pointe GC
The Blackthorn Club at the Ridges	OD		Johnson City	Tennessee	United States	
Westhaven GC	OD		Franklin	Tennessee	United States	
Heritage Ranch G&CC	OD		Fairview	Texas	United States	
Stonebridge Ranch CC	OD		McKinney	Texas	United States	Hills Course
Trophy Club CC	OD		Trophy Club	Texas	United States	Whitworth Course
Wolfdancer GC	OD		Cedar Creek	Texas	United States	
Wingpointe	OD		Salt Lake City	Utah	United States	closed November 15, 2015
Belle Haven CC	OD		Alexandria	Virginia	United States	
Colonial Heritage GC	OD		Williamsburg	Virginia	United States	
Heritage Hunt G&CC	OD		Gainesville	Virginia	United States	
Trump National GC — Washington, D.C. (The River Course)	OD		Potomac Falls	Virginia	United States	
Harbour Pointe GC	OD		Mukilteo	Washington	United States	
La Crosse CC	OD		Onalaska	Wisconsin	United States	
Washington County GC	OD		Hartford	Wisconsin	United States	
Silver Creek GC	OD		Garden River	Ontario	Canada	Garden River First National
Croatian Dream	OD		Dubrovnik		Croatia	
Paraiso del Mar GC	OD		La Paz	Baja California Sur	Mexico	
Oitavos Dunes	OD		Cascais	Lisbon	Portugal	
Hills Golf Club	OD		Mölndal		Sweden	south of Gothenburg
The Vintage Club	OD		Khlong Dan	Samut Prakan	Thailand	east of Bangkok, Thailand
