= Lego Stunt Rally =

2000 video game

- Developers: Intelligent Games; Graphic State (GBC)
- Publisher: Lego Media
- Platforms: Windows, Game Boy Color
- Release: Windows; 4 October 2000; Game Boy Color; EU: 22 December 2000; NA: 17 January 2001
- Genre: Racing
- Modes: Single-player, multiplayer

Lego Stunt Rally is a 2000 racing game themed around the Lego line of construction toys. The Windows version was developed by Intelligent Games and published by Lego Media.

== Gameplay ==
Lego Stunt Rally is a racing game with slot car characteristics. It is set on the fictional Stunt Island, which is split into four thematic parts: the city, desert, jungle, and ice worlds. Each world has four levels followed by a boss (Radium, Baron Flambo, Snake, and Glacia, respectively), plus a race against the island's proprietor Mr. X, making for a total of 21 levels. Before each race, the player must choose from one of four player characters—Chip, Lucky, Barney, and Wrench—and customize their car to adjust speed and traction. The player controls the car using the arrow keys. Tracks feature stunts pieces like loopings, ramps, and fans that propel cars into the air, as well as hazards, including quicksand and ice, and a timed traps such as spikes and a car crusher. Winning races grants the player additional cars and track pieces for the construction mode, in which the player can create custom tracks.

== Development ==
Intelligent Games began developing Lego Stunt Rally as Lego Moto in 1998. Prototypes featured free-form, as the lead designer Dee Jarvis had envisioned. As children veered off the road repeatedly in playtests, cars were locked to the road akin to the Scalextric toy line. A PlayStation port commenced at Intelligent Games before it was shifted to Asylum Entertainment under the lead programmer Manel Sort and eventually cancelled. Lego Media released the game on 4 October 2000. A Game Boy Color adaptation was developed by Graphic State. In Poland, IM Group published a localized version in April 2001 used it for a tournament to promote the opening of the Empik megastore in Kraków in June.
