= Tiger Woods PGA Tour 12 =

2011 video game

Tiger Woods PGA Tour 12: The Masters
- Developer: EA Tiburon
- Publisher: EA Sports
- Series: PGA Tour
- Platforms: PlayStation 3, Wii, Xbox 360, Microsoft Windows, Mac OS X
- Release: PlayStation 3, Wii, Xbox 360: NA: March 29, 2011; AU: March 31, 2011; EU: April 1, 2011; Microsoft Windows, Mac OS X: NA: September 6, 2011
- Genre: Sports
- Modes: Single-player, multiplayer

Tiger Woods PGA Tour 12: The Masters is a sports video game developed by EA Tiburon and published by EA Sports for PlayStation 3, Wii, Xbox 360, Microsoft Windows and Mac OS X, and is the last game in the series available on a Nintendo platform.

== Features ==
Tiger Woods PGA Tour 12 featured The Masters tournament at Augusta National Golf Club for the first time. It also features the debut of commentary by Jim Nantz of CBS Sports and the return of David Feherty. Professional golfers Rickie Fowler, Bubba Watson and Zach Johnson made their debuts in the game.

== Reception ==
Reception

Aggregate score
Aggregator	Score			
Aggregator	PC	PS3	Wii	Xbox 360
Metacritic	43/100	80/100	85/100	80/100

Review scores
Publication	Score			
Publication	PC	PS3	Wii	Xbox 360
Game Informer	N/A	9/10	8.75/10	9/10
GamePro	N/A	N/A	N/A	4/5
GameRevolution	N/A	B	N/A	B
GameSpot	5.5/10	8/10	8/10	8/10
GameTrailers	N/A	8.4/10	N/A	8.4/10
IGN	N/A	8/10	8/10	8/10
Joystiq	N/A	4/5	N/A	N/A
Nintendo Power	N/A	N/A	8.5/10	N/A
Official Xbox Magazine (US)	N/A	N/A	N/A	6.5/10
PC Gamer (UK)	15%	N/A	N/A	N/A
PlayStation: The Official Magazine	N/A	8/10	N/A	N/A
The Daily Telegraph	N/A	N/A	N/A	7/10
The Guardian	N/A	N/A	N/A	4/5

Tiger Woods PGA Tour 12 received "generally unfavorable" for the PC versions and "generally favorable" reviews for the console versions, according to review aggregator Metacritic.
