= Rory McIlroy PGA Tour =

2015 video game

- Developer: EA Tiburon
- Publisher: Electronic Arts
- Series: PGA Tour
- Engine: Frostbite 3
- Platforms: PlayStation 4 Xbox One
- Release: NA: July 14, 2015; PAL: July 16, 2015
- Genre: Sports
- Modes: Single-player, multiplayer

Rory McIlroy PGA Tour is a sports video game developed by EA Tiburon and published by Electronic Arts for PlayStation 4 and Xbox One. It is an entry in the EA Sports PGA Tour franchise, and was the first in the series since 1999 not to feature Tiger Woods as its namesake, replacing him with Rory McIlroy.

The game was re-built from scratch as part of its shift to eighth generation consoles, adopting DICE's Frostbite 3 engine (primarily used for the Battlefield franchise) due to its graphical fidelity and ability to handle courses as large-scale maps (as opposed to having an individual map for each hole). Additionally, the game introduces new swing modes and assists, Golf Channel personalities and in-game presentation, and an arcade-style challenge mode.

Rory McIlroy PGA Tour received mixed reviews; although critics acknowledged the game's increased graphics quality and realism over previous installments in the franchise, the game was criticized primarily for its regressions over previous entries in the franchise, including a small number of available courses on launch, and the removal of various modes and features that had been present in previous PGA Tour games; additional courses, and some of these missing features, were added back in subsequent updates.

== Development ==
EA Sports' PGA Tour franchise was placed on a hiatus following its 2013 release, Tiger Woods PGA Tour 14; in October 2013, EA announced that the game would also be the final installment in the series co-branded with Tiger Woods. At its E3 press conference in June 2014, the company presented footage of the next game in the series under the working title EA Sports PGA Tour. In March 2015, Rory McIlroy became a new title athlete, naming the game Rory McIlroy PGA Tour. It was scheduled to be released in June 2015, before being delayed to July 14, 2015.

Unlike other recent EA Sports titles, which were unified around the Ignite engine, Rory McIlroy PGA Tour utilizes the Frostbite 3 engine, originally developed by DICE for the Battlefield franchise. The Frostbite engine allows an entire course to be rendered all at once on a single map rather than on a hole-by-hole basis, reducing loading times between holes. Executive producer Brent Nielsen explained that Frostbite 3 was tailored towards "creating complex, lifelike environments", and that it allowed the team to "recreate some of the world's most beautiful courses, as well as create some new ideas of our own." Producer Ryan Ferwerda explained that the changes necessitated a complete rebuild of the game from scratch.

Rory McIlroy PGA Tour features NBC Sports' Golf Channel in-game presentation, with NBC Sports' Golf Channel commentators Rich Lerner and Frank Nobilo replacing CBS Sports' Jim Nantz and David Feherty as the game's commentators.

== Gameplay ==
Rory McIlroy PGA Tour contains new features, assists and gameplay changes. New Backswing Meter, Aiming Arc, and putt read features were added to assist players in making accurate shots. Three main swing modes are offered; "Arcade", which uses the analog sticks to swing and allows application of spin to the ball in mid-air, the traditional "3-Click", and "Tour"—an advanced mode similar to Arcade mode, but with no assists enabled at all and higher sensitivity. Players can toggle individual assists to customize their experience.

The usage of Frostbite 3 provides more realistic physics and interactions between the ball and aspects of the environment, such as accounting for firmness and grass length, and shooting balls through plants and trees. As an entire course is now treated as a single map, errant shots can also land and be played from areas that were previously considered out-of-bounds and incurred penalties.

A new mode, Night Club Challenge, requires players to make shots at targets in a nightclub-inspired setting.

Some features were removed in comparison to PGA Tour 14; amateur (aside from a Web.com Tour event for earning the player's PGA Tour membership) and women's events were removed, as well as certain alternate modes (such as Stableford scoring) beyond stroke and match play, the ability to play individual or certain types of holes (only back 9, front 9, or 18 can be played), online Country Clubs Quick Tournament, weather, and career schedules.

=== Courses ===
Rory McIlroy PGA Tour includes eight real-world courses on-disc; Bay Hill, Chambers Bay, the Old Course at St. Andrews, Royal Troon, TPC Boston, TPC Sawgrass, Whistling Straits, and Wolf Creek. TPC Scottsdale was a pre-order exclusive. Additional courses will be added through downloadable content. Four fantasy courses are also offered, including one based on the Battlefield 4 map Paracel Storm, the Grand Canyon, and a nightclub-themed course for the game's new challenge mode.

Due to an expired license, Augusta National and the Masters Tournament do not appear in the game, although an EA representative has suggested that the course may be re-introduced as DLC in the future.

== Updates ==
Free updates were released to add additional features to the game. TPC Scottsdale, East Lake Golf Club, the fantasy course Treasure Island, and Quail Hollow Club were added in August, September, October, and November 2015, respectively. The Quail Hollow update also re-introduced alternate shot, best ball, four ball, and skins play. Henrik Stenson and Dustin Johnson were also added as playable characters in October and November 2015 respectively. PGA West Stadium Course was added in January 2016.

In March 2016, Oakmont Country Club (host of the 2016 U.S. Open) was added, as well as updated commentary relating to it. An update in May 2016 added Banff Springs, a recurring course from previous PGA Tour games. The update also introduced changes to the behavior of majors in career mode, which now alternate between one of two included courses that had recently hosted it, such as Chambers Bay (2015) and Oakmont for the U.S. Open, St. Andrews (2015) and Royal Troon (2016) for the Open Championship, and Whistling Straits (2015) and Quail Hollow (2017) for the PGA Championship.

== Reception ==
Reception

Aggregate score
Aggregator	Score	
Aggregator	PS4	Xbox One
Metacritic	61/100	60/100

Review scores
Publication	Score	
Publication	PS4	Xbox One
Electronic Gaming Monthly	N/A	6.5/10
Game Informer	7/10	N/A
GameRevolution	2.5/5	N/A
GameSpot	4/10	N/A
GamesRadar+	N/A	3/5
IGN	5.5/10	N/A
Polygon	N/A	6/10
VideoGamer.com	5/10	N/A

Rory McIlroy PGA Tour received "mixed or average" reviews, according to review aggregator Metacritic.

Polygon gave Rory McIlroy PGA Tour a 6 out of 10; the game was praised for the improvements brought by its new engine (including its visual appearance, short loading times, and ball physics), the new putting system, its career progression, which now allowed players to "[deepen their] package of abilities instead of forcing him or her to be pure power, pure accuracy or down the middle", "lifelike" crowds, Golf Channel commentators that were "much more conversational than the wooden and overacted delivery of Jim Nantz", albeit somewhat repetitive. The game was criticized for its lack of courses and events (with only two of the Men's majors represented, and the removal of LPGA events and all but one Web.com Tour event), limited character creation options, as well as the removal of features that were present in previous editions of the PGA Tour franchise. The challenge mode was considered fun, but not comparable to modes in previous installments that focused on the history of golf. As a result, Polygon concluded that Rory McIlroy PGA Tour was "a smooth-playing game of golf, which makes the inability to use its new gameplay on the old features fans loved even more regrettable."

IGN was similarly negative, giving the game a 5.5 out of 10; although praising the new swing modes and assists for allowing players to customize gameplay to better suit their play style, and the new Frostbite engine for being "appreciably superior than the links of the last generation—even if some of the textures are a little flat and a lot of the course features tend to pop in around the path of the ball's flight", Rory McIlroy PGA Tour was criticized for its lack of content and the removal of features that were present in previous installments of EA Sports' PGA Tour franchise. The lack of features was most apparent in career mode, which saw the removal of bonus objectives, practice rounds, career schedules and the trophy room among others, joking that "if a professional career in golf was really this unrewarding and directionless, Rory McIlroy would probably have set his sights on a Master's in Accounting rather than the one in Augusta." They concluded that "concessions are often made when sports games straddle the gap between console generations old and new, but considering the two year wait for a game that is only being released on current-gen hardware, the rampant slash and burn of its feature set is particularly galling. EA Tiburon has managed to create a golf game with plenty of holes in it; just not the kind that fans will relish."

== Shutdown ==
The online services shut down on January 16, 2025. This made users unable to access any online multiplayer features of the game.
