= Pro 18 World Tour Golf =

1999 video game

Pro 18: World Tour Golf
- Developer: Intelligent Games
- Publisher: Psygnosis
- Platforms: Microsoft Windows, PlayStation
- Release: PlayStation: NA: March 31, 1999; EU: 1999; Windows: EU: 1999; NA: June 30, 1999
- Genre: Sports
- Modes: Single-player, multiplayer

Pro 18 World Tour Golf is a video game developed by Intelligent Games and published by Psygnosis for Microsoft Windows and PlayStation in 1999.

== Reception ==
Reception

Aggregate score
Aggregator	Score	
Aggregator	PC	PS
GameRankings	54%	52%

Review scores
Publication	Score	
Publication	PC	PS
AllGame	3.5/5	2/5
Computer Games Strategy Plus	2/5	N/A
Computer Gaming World	1.5/5	N/A
Electronic Gaming Monthly	N/A	4.875/10
Game Informer	N/A	1/10
GameFan	N/A	60%
GamePro	2.5/5	N/A
GameSpot	4.2/10	4.6/10
GameZone	8.8/10	N/A
IGN	5.3/10	3/10
Official U.S. PlayStation Magazine	N/A	2/5
PC Accelerator	6/10	N/A
PC Zone	46%	N/A

The game received mixed reviews on both platforms according to the review aggregation website GameRankings. Game Informer gave the PlayStation version an overwhelming dislike, over two months before it was released Stateside. PC Accelerator gave the PC version a mixed review, a few months before its U.S. release date.
