= Home Depot Invitational =

The Home Depot Invitational was a golf tournament on the Champions Tour from 1983 to 2001. It was played in Charlotte, North Carolina at the Quail Hollow Club (1983-1989) and at the TPC at Piper Glen (1990-2001).

The purse for the 2001 tournament was US$1,300,000, with $195,000 going to the winner. The tournament was founded in 1983 as the World Seniors Invitational.

== Winners ==
Home Depot Invitational

- 2001 Bruce Fleisher
- 2000 Bruce Fleisher
- 1999 Bruce Fleisher
- 1998 Jim Dent
- 1997 Jim Dent

PaineWebber Invitational

- 1996 Graham Marsh
- 1995 Bob Murphy
- 1994 Lee Trevino
- 1993 Mike Hill
- 1992 Don Bies
- 1991 Orville Moody
- 1990 Bruce Crampton
- 1989 No tournament - canceled due to Hurricane Hugo.
- 1988 Dave Hill

PaineWebber World Seniors Invitational

- 1987 Gary Player
- 1986 Bruce Crampton
- 1985 Miller Barber

World Seniors Invitational

- 1984 Peter Thomson
- 1983 Doug Sanders
