= Imperium (1990 video game) =

Strategy video game

- Developer: Intelligent Games
- Publisher: Electronic Arts
- Producer: Joss Ellis
- Designer: Matthew Stibbe
- Programmer: Nicholas Wilson
- Artist: Carl Cropley
- Composer: Nicholas Wilson
- Platforms: DOS, Atari ST, Amiga
- Release: 1990
- Genre: Strategy
- Mode: Single-player

Imperium is a 4X strategy video game published by Electronic Arts in 1990 for the Amiga, Atari ST, and DOS.

== Plot ==
Imperium is a space adventure video game in which the player can choose to either dominate the whole galaxy or survive to be 1,000 years of age. The player controls all political and military elements, and can spread the influence of the empire while stopping other empires from gaining influence over the area under control of the player. The player maintains invasion forces, the construction of fleets, and reinforcing the loyalty of subordinates, and can allow the computer to control the economics, defense, and diplomacy of the empire.

== Gameplay ==
Imperium is driven by icon and windows. The player uses icons to save and load games, establish alliances with and embargoes against opponents, review the wealth level, deploy strategic forces and fight, view the maps, and gather information from news and other reports. The players can set windows all around the screen, which contain selection areas where the player can either type in data or click to retrieve more data. All of these icons and all but one of the windows, and all the information they provide, are displayed in monochrome.

== Reception ==
The game was reviewed in 1991 in Dragon #165 by Hartley, Patricia, and Kirk Lesser in "The Role of Computers" column. The reviewers gave the game 4 out of 5 stars. Computer Gaming World in 1991 criticized Imperium's production values as "not what would be expected in an American game", but praised the gameplay and the computer opponent. The magazine concluded that "due to its strategic complexity and depth of play, it is certain to give any strategic gamer plenty of hours of enjoyment". In a 1992 survey of science fiction games the magazine gave the title four of five stars, stating that the game "seemed to quickly disappear from the market. Yet its rich texture and gameplay deserve a second look". A 1994 survey of strategic space games set in the year 2000 and later gave the game three-plus stars.
