= TPC Las Vegas =

Golf course in Las Vegas

Coordinates: 36°10′34″N 115°18′34″W

- Interactive map of TPC Las Vegas

Club information
- Location: Las Vegas, Nevada, USA
- Established: 1996
- Type: Public
- Operator: PGA Tour TPC Network
- Tota holes: 18
- Tournaments: Las Vegas Senior Classic (1994–2001)
- Website: http://www.tpc.com/lasvegas
- Designed by: Bobby Weed, Raymond Floyd
- Par: 71
- Length: 7,063 yards

TPC Las Vegas, formerly TPC at The Canyons, is an 18-hole golf course located in the planned community of Summerlin in western Las Vegas, Nevada.

Opened in 1996 and designed by Bobby Weed in consultation with tour professional Raymond Floyd, TPC Las Vegas is part of the PGA Tour's Tournament Players Club network. It was the venue for the Las Vegas Senior Classic, a tournament on the Champions Tour, from 1994 to 2001. The course was featured in the PS1 version of Tiger Woods PGA Tour 2001.
