= Tiger Woods 99 PGA Tour Golf =

1998 golf video game

Tiger Woods 99: PGA Tour Golf
- Developer: Adrenalin Entertainment
- Publisher: EA Sports
- Series: PGA Tour
- Platforms: Microsoft Windows, PlayStation
- Release: Windows: NA: August 26, 1998; EU: 1998; PlayStation: NA: November 23, 1998; EU: November 15, 1998
- Genre: Sports
- Modes: Single-player, multiplayer

Tiger Woods 99: PGA Tour Golf (also known as just Tiger Woods 99) is a sports video game developed by Adrenalin Entertainment and published by EA Sports for Microsoft Windows and PlayStation in 1998.

== Development ==
In mid-1997 EA Sports signed an exclusive deal with Tiger Woods to use his name and likeness on their line of golf games. EA Sports reportedly paid approximately $10 million (equivalent to $20 million in 2025) for the rights, which spanned several years and multiple gaming platforms. The day after the deal was officially announced, the stock of EA Sports's parent company Electronic Arts went up 10 percent.

== Expansions ==
Four three-course expansion packs were released for the Windows version of the game: The TPC Courses, which includes the TPC at Scottsdale, Southwind, and Las Colinas; The Tournament Courses, which includes Bay Hill, Cog Hill's Dubsdread course, and the Colonial Country Club; The Vegas Courses, which includes the Las Vegas Country Club, Badlands, and the TPC at The Canyons; and The Monterey Courses, which includes Spyglass Hill, Spanish Bay, and Poppy Hills, as well as an updated version of Pebble Beach with the new 5th hole. The packs were also compatible with PGA Tour Pro.

== Recall ==
The first 100,000 pressings of Tiger Woods 99 for the PlayStation contained an unusual dummy file. If the disc is loaded into a computer, directories for files of the game would appear along with a file named "ZZDUMMY.DAT", which is a renamed QuickTime file. When played, it is a VHS recording of 1995 The Spirit of Christmas short film, Jesus vs. Santa, by Trey Parker and Matt Stone, commonly recognized as a pilot episode for South Park. The short film was included as padding on the game disc by a developer at Adrenalin Interactive, and according to the metadata it was converted four days before being added to the disc. EA recalled these copies of the game a few months after it was released, calling the short "objectionable to consumers", and subsequent versions did not contain the file.

== Reception ==
Reception

Aggregate score
Aggregator	Score	
Aggregator	PC	PS
GameRankings	76%	73%

Review scores
Publication	Score	
Publication	PC	PS
AllGame	4/5	3/5
CNET Gamecenter	8/10	8/10
Computer Games Strategy Plus	4/5	N/A
Computer Gaming World	3.5/5	N/A
Electronic Gaming Monthly	N/A	6.125/10
Game Informer	7.75/10	2/10
GamePro	4.5/5	4/5
GameRevolution	B	N/A
GameSpot	7.7/10	7.5/10
IGN	7.8/10	7.1/10
Next Generation	3/5	N/A
Official U.S. PlayStation Magazine	N/A	4/5
PC Accelerator	7/10	N/A
PC Gamer (US)	84%	N/A
Entertainment Weekly	A	N/A

The PC version received "favorable" reviews, while the PlayStation version received "average" reviews, according to the review aggregation website GameRankings. Next Generation called the former "a sharp golf game, compatible with last June's PGA Tour Pro software updates and course discs."
