= Sandy Tatum =

American lawyer

Frank Donovan "Sandy" Tatum Jr. (July 7, 1920 – June 22, 2017) was an attorney, a golf administrator, a golf course architect, a golf promoter, and an amateur golfer.

== Education ==
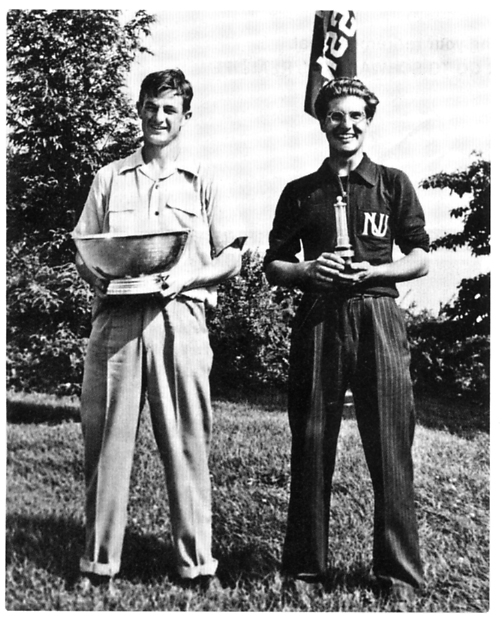
Tatum (left) at the 1942 NCAA Championship

Tatum attended Stanford University, where he was a member of Stanford's golf team, which won back-to-back NCAA Men's Golf Championships in 1941 and 1942. In 1942, Tatum won the individual title.

== Career ==
Following his graduation from Stanford, Tatum attended Oxford University as a Rhodes Scholar, and received his BCL in 1949. He returned to Stanford, where he earned a JD in 1950, and was admitted to the bar in California in 1950. He was an attorney with Cooley Godward Kronish in Palo Alto, California.

From 1978 to 1980, Tatum served as president of the United States Golf Association, and he served on the USGA executive committee from 1972 to 1980.

Tatum played an important role in persuading the USGA to bring the U.S. Open to the Olympic Club in San Francisco in 1955; the championship has since returned there four times: in 1966, 1987, 1998, and 2012. He also was instrumental in the USGA's decision to take the Open to Pebble Beach Golf Links, south of the Bay Area, for the first time in 1972; the championship has since returned there five times: in 1982, 1992, 2000, 2010, and 2019.

In the early 2000s, Tatum led a successful campaign for renovation of the Harding Park Golf Club in San Francisco, which had previously hosted many PGA Tour events in the 1950s and 1960s, but which had fallen into disrepair. It took several years, but the Harding Park course was restored to prominence, and has since held several high-profile golf events, including the 2020 PGA Championship.

Tatum was involved in the design and development of The Links at Spanish Bay golf course in Pebble Beach, California. He co-designed The Preserve Golf Club in Carmel, California and Lockeford Springs Golf Course in Lodi, California, as well as Mount Shasta Resort in Mount Shasta, California.

He was involved with The First Tee of San Francisco chapter out of Harding Park, and went on to host "Sandy's Circle" through the Northern California Golf Association to help fund the Youth on Course subsidized round program in 2007.

Tatum remained an active golfer into his 90s.

== Death ==
Tatum died on June 22, 2017, at the age of 96.

== Awards and honors ==
- Tatum is a member of the Stanford Athletic Hall of Fame
- In 2011, Tatum was inducted into the Bay Area Sports Hall of Fame

== Bibliography ==
- A Love Affair with the Game, with foreword by Tom Watson, ISBN 9781888531107
