= PGA Tour Golf III =

1994 video game

- Developers: Polygames; High Score Productions; Manley & Associates (Mac)
- Publisher: EA Sports
- Series: PGA Tour
- Platforms: Sega Genesis, Macintosh
- Release: Genesis: EU: November 25, 1994; NA: December 1994; Macintosh; 1995
- Genre: Sports
- Modes: Single-player, multiplayer

PGA Tour Golf III is a sports video game developed by Polygames and High Score Productions and published by EA Sports for Sega Genesis in 1994 as the third mainline entry in the PGA Tour series. A Macintosh version co-developed by Manley & Associates was released in 1995. Ports were also announced for the Super NES, Game Boy, and Game Gear as part of 1995 publishing deal between Electronic Arts and THQ. None were released under the title PGA Tour Golf III. However, the next game in the series, PGA Tour 96, did show up on those consoles that year.

== Playable courses ==
The featured courses are TPC at River Highlands, TPC at The Woodlands, TPC at Avenel, TPC at Summerlin, TPC at Sawgrass, TPC at Las Colinas, TPC at Southwind, and TPC of Scottsdale.

== Playable characters ==
The game features 11 professional golfers as playable or as CPU opponents: Brad Faxon, Jim Gallagher Jr., Lee Janzen, Tom Kite, Bruce Lietzke, Davis Love III, Mark O’Meara, Jeff Sluman, Craig Stadler, and Fuzzy Zoeller.

== Reception ==
Reception

Review scores
Publication	Score
GamePro	4.325/5
Mean Machines Sega	81/100
Next Generation	4/5
Electronic Games	A
Joypad	90%
Liverpool Daily Post	16/20
MAN!AC	85%
Mega Console	80/100
Mega Fun	90%
Micromanía	89%
Play Time	90%
Player One	85%
Sega Magazine	92/100
Sega Pro	89%
TodoSega	90%
VideoGames	9/10
Video Games (DE)	86%

PGA Tour Golf III enjoyed a universally positive critical reception. GamePro's review stated that "Beautifully polished graphics and game-play refinements enhance the already-awesome action that has put PGA Tour at the top of the leaderboard." They particularly praised the detailed digitized backgrounds and the new Ball Lie window, saying it adds a new layer of complexity to lining up shots. The Daily Telegraph recommended the game to sports fans, while John Cotey of the St. Petersburg Times felt the game would appeal to those who disliked golfing, as well as those who loved it.

Next Generation reviewed the game, rating it four stars out of five, and stated that "Golf fans put down that Golf Digest, keep your eye on the ball, keep your left arm straight, and pick up this game."

MacUser named PGA Tour Golf III one of the top 50 CD-ROMs of 1995, and gave it a score of 3.5 out of 5.

Air Hendrix of GamePro reviewed PGA Tour 96 in 1996 and compared the SNES version to PGA Tour Golf III, saying it fails to outdo the Genesis's PGA Tour Golf III, due to the weak audio and absence of features like backspin and 3D terrain, but is superior to the Genesis version of the game and makes an overall "good round of golf".
