= TPC at Piper Glen =

Private golf club in Charlotte, North Carolina

Coordinates: 35.0736°N 80.8109°W

- Interactive map of TPC at Piper Glen

Club information
- Location: Charlotte, North Carolina, United States
- Established: 1988
- Type: Private
- Owner: ClubCorp
- Operator: ClubCorp
- Tota holes: 18
- Tournaments: Home Depot Invitational (1990–2001)
- Website: http://tpcpiperglen.com/
- Designed by: Arnold Palmer
- Par: 72
- Length: 6,850
- Course rating: 73.7

TPC at Piper Glen (full name Tournament Players Club at Piper Glen) is a private golf club located in Charlotte, North Carolina, United States.

== History ==
The Arnold Palmer designed championship golf course is a member of the Tournament Players Club network operated by the PGA Tour. In 2007, the facility was sold to the Heritage Golf Group, but retained its TPC branding under a licensing agreement. Between 1990 and 2001 TPC at Piper Glen hosted the Home Depot Invitational, a tournament on the Champions Tour schedule

== Design ==
TPC Piper Glen is designed for a unique combination of beauty, challenge and pure playability. The stunning layout is said to bring out the best of the rolling North Carolina terrain – with natural rock outcroppings, lush oak trees and quiet lake inlets.

== Record ==
The course record from the back tees is held by PGA pro Brendon de Jonge at -12 (60).
