= PGA Tour 98 =

1997 video game

- Developer: NuFX
- Publisher: EA Sports
- Series: PGA Tour
- Platform: PlayStation
- Release: NA: September 29, 1997; EU: November 1997
- Genre: Sports
- Modes: Single-player, multiplayer

PGA Tour 98 is a sports video game developed by NuFX and published by EA Sports exclusively for PlayStation in 1997. It was the last game in the series to not feature an athlete's name in the title until EA Sports PGA Tour in 2023.

== Reception ==
Reception

Review scores
Publication	Score
AllGame	3/5
CNET Gamecenter	3/5
Consoles +	89%
Computer and Video Games	2/5
Electronic Gaming Monthly	6.75/10
Game Informer	6.75/10
GameFan	62% (Note: In GameFan's viewpoint of the game, one critic gave it 74, and the other 50.)
GameRevolution	C
IGN	7/10
Next Generation	3/5

The game received average reviews. Next Generation said that the game "may be one of the best PlayStation golf games by default – it's one of the only PlayStation golf games. But at least it's actually worth playing this year." GamePro praised the animations, detailed courses, commentary, and challenging gameplay, criticized the pixelation of the graphics in close ups and the distracting background sounds, and, similarly to Next Generation, concluded that despite its flaws PGA Tour 98 was "definitely the best golf game released for any 32-bit system." (Note: GamePro gave the game two 4/5 scores for graphics and sound, and two 4.5/5 scores for control and overall fun factor.)

IGN criticized the game's slow loading times and dated sprite-based graphics. Electronic Gaming Monthly's four reviewers were split about the game. Crispin Boyer and Ken "Sushi-X" Williams gave it an 8 and a 7.5 respectively, particularly praising how the game enables players to enjoy it in either a casual, beginner-friendly manner or an intense, detail-obsessed manner, while Kraig Kujawa and guest reviewer David Siller gave it a 4.5 and a 7 respectively, citing the long load times between the swing meter and the actual swing, which they said slows down an already slow-paced sport.
