= LPGA International =

American golf club

Coordinates: 29°11′30″N 81°06′30″W

- Interactive map of LPGA International

Club information
- Location: Daytona Beach, Florida, U.S.
- Established: 1994
- Type: Public
- Owner: ForeGolf Partners
- Operator: ForeGolf Partners
- Total holes: 36
- Tournaments: Arch Wireless Championship; Sprint Titleholders Championship; NCAA Women's Championship
- Website: LPGA International

Champions Course
- Designed by: Rees Jones
- Par: 72
- Length: 7088/6664/6240/5744/5131
- Course rating: 74.8/72.9/70.7/68.1/74.1/70.0

Legends Course
- Designed by: Arthur Hills
- Par: 72
- Length: 6984/6594/6339/5827/5155
- Course rating: 74.6/73.1/71.9/69.8/73.9/69.9
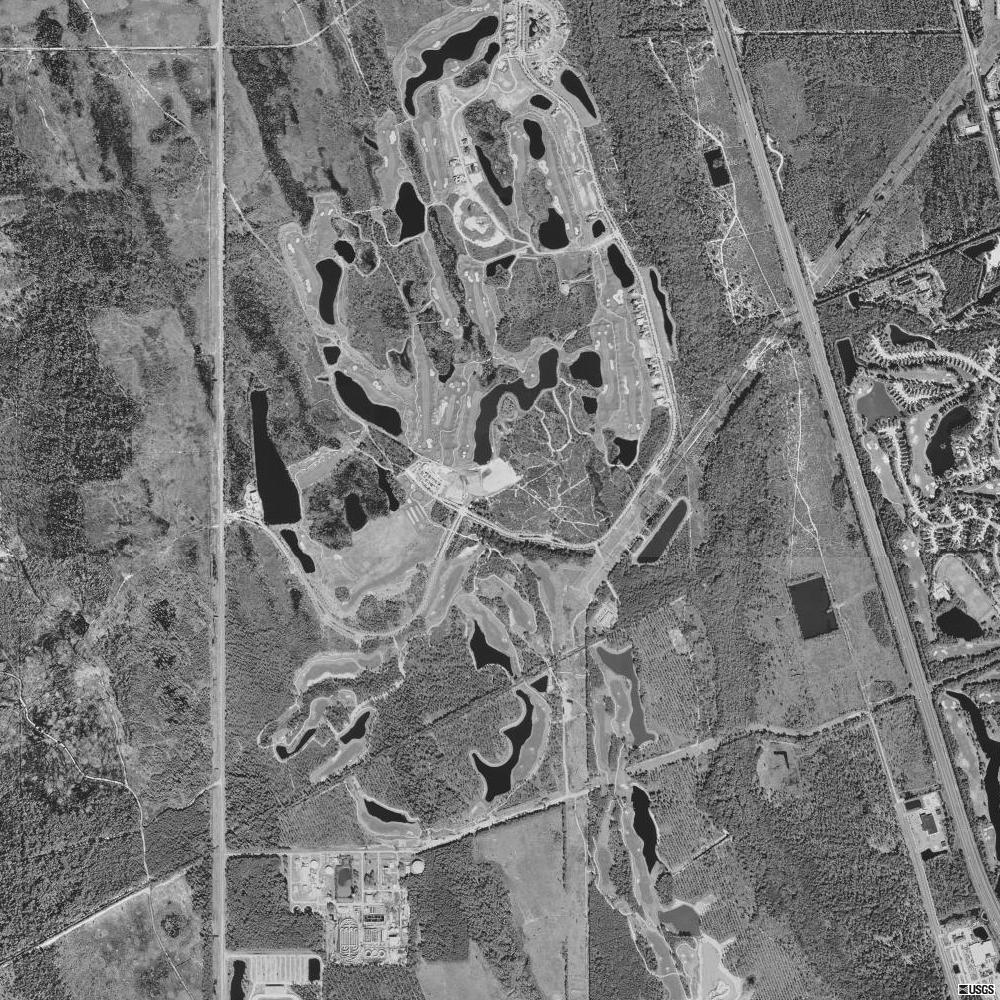
- Aerial view

LPGA International is a golf club located in Daytona Beach, Florida, United States, and the main golf facility used by the Ladies Professional Golf Association (LPGA). The golf club offers two 18-hole courses, Champions and Legends. In 2013, these were renamed to the Jones and Hills courses, reflecting the architects who designed them.

== Overview ==
In addition to the two Bermuda grass golf courses, the facility offers a driving range, practice putting green, and full-service restaurant. The complex is owned and operated by Fore Golf Partners.

== History ==
When the Ladies Professional Golf Association was looking for a new headquarters in the late 1980s, the City of Daytona Beach made an effort to attract them to this city. Daytona Beach renamed Eleventh Street to LPGA Boulevard and offered to build a new golf course for the LPGA on undeveloped land near the western border of the city. Consolidated Tomoka Land Company agreed to donate 650 acres of land to the city, and the result was LPGA International.

The venue has hosted the Mercury Titleholders Championship from 1995 to 2000, Arch Wireless Championship in 2000, several editions of the Symetra Tour Championship, the LPGA Tour Final Qualifying Tournament, and the 2001 and 2007 NCAA Division I Women's Golf Championships.

== The Courses ==
=== Jones Course ===
Rees Jones designed the Jones Course, which opened in 1994 and is a favorite of tour players. It offers traditional links style golf design, totaling 7,088 yards. It poses a challenge with strategic mounding, sand bunkers, natural marsh areas, beautiful lakes and undulating greens.

The Jones course has been rated as four and a half stars (out of five) on average by Golf Digest magazine readers. GolfLink.com users have rated the Champion course at four stars (out of five) overall. In its 2013 ranking of America's Top 50 Golf Courses for Women, Golf Digest ranked the Champions Course seventh.

Champions Scorecard
Tee	Rating/Slope	1	2	3	4	5	6	7	8	9	Out	10	11	12	13	14	15	16	17	18	In	Total
Black	74.8 / 145	401	457	197	363	545	162	444	383	569	3521	338	411	403	576	191	468	525	203	452	3567	7088
Blue	72.9 / 141	383	428	174	355	518	141	413	369	549	3330	332	378	363	548	159	429	513	168	444	3334	6664
White	70.7 / 137	358	402	167	328	469	137	372	360	522	3115	312	356	356	533	151	391	475	163	388	3125	6240
SI	Men's	12	2	18	14	4	16	6	10	8		17	9	13	1	15	5	11	7	3
Par		4	4	3	4	5	3	4	4	5	36	4	4	4	5	3	4	5	3	4	36	72
Gold	M:68.1/130 W:74.1/137	348	364	145	321	448	120	338	325	464	2873	305	346	348	482	143	338	424	140	345	2871	5744
Red	70.0 / 123	296	316	94	244	401	91	333	275	460	2510	231	320	284	478	108	334	419	107	340	2621	5131
SI	Women's	10	6	18	14	2	16	8	12	4		17	7	11	1	15	5	9	13	3

=== Hills Course ===
Arthur Hills designed the Hills Course, which opened in 1998 and offers a design of 6,984 yards. The course features natural wetlands, narrow pine corridors, small greens and strategically placed water hazards. The Hills course is considered to be the more challenging of the two.

The Hills course has been rated as four and a half stars (out of five) on average by Golf Digest magazine readers. GolfLink.com users have rated the Legends course at three stars (out of five) overall.

Legends Scorecard
Tee	Rating/Slope	1	2	3	4	5	6	7	8	9	Out	10	11	12	13	14	15	16	17	18	In	Total
Black	74.6 / 148	386	561	165	371	380	406	207	532	441	3449	406	410	185	393	531	195	567	434	414	3535	6984
Blue	73.1 / 141	374	548	140	340	366	393	195	518	374	3248	371	381	168	378	516	177	539	419	397	3346	6594
White	71.9 / 137	362	527	130	325	353	382	185	509	366	3139	356	370	149	368	502	164	510	407	374	3200	6339
SI	Men's	12	2	18	10	16	8	6	4	14		7	13	17	11	5	15	3	9	1
Par		4	5	3	4	4	4	3	5	4	36	4	4	3	4	5	3	5	4	4	36	72
Gold	M:69.8/129 W:73.9/135	352	485	118	302	323	346	168	479	338	2911	314	329	130	350	482	140	496	335	340	2916	5827
Red	69.9 / 119	324	464	101	280	294	317	136	443	318	2677	262	311	113	224	397	125	441	313	292	2478	5155
SI	Women's	12	6	18	10	16	4	8	2	14		7	9	13	17	1	15	5	11	3
