= Colonial Country Club =

Colonial Country Club may refer to:

- Colonial Country Club (Fort Worth) in Texas
- Colonial Country Club (Memphis) in Tennessee
- Colonial Golf and Country Club in the New Orleans suburb of Harahan, Louisiana

== See also ==
- Colonial Club, a collegiate social club at Princeton University
