= Tournament Players Club =

American chain of private and public golf courses

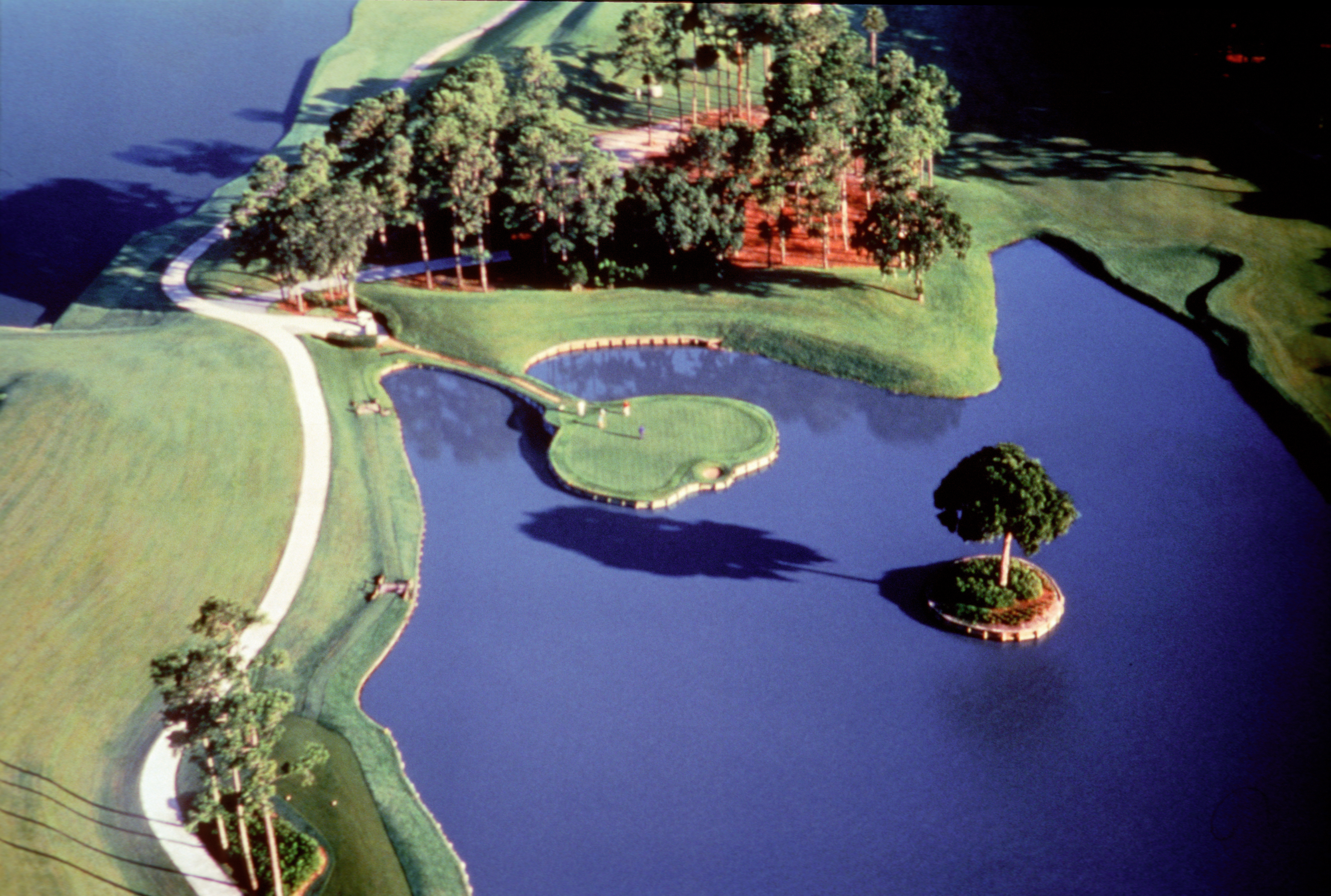
- The 17th hole at the TPC Sawgrass is one of the most famous holes of golf in the world.
- Type: Subsidiary
- Industry: Golf course management
- Founded: 1980; 46 years ago in Ponte Vedra Beach, Florida, United States
- Founder: Deane Beman
- Headquarters: Ponte Vedra Beach, Florida, United States
- Area served: Worldwide
- Products: Public and private golf courses, golf resorts and tournament venues
- Owner: PGA Tour
- Website: tpc.com

Tournament Players Club (TPC) is an American chain of public and private golf courses operated by the PGA Tour. Most of the courses either are or have been hosts for PGA Tour events, with the remainder having frequently hosted events on the Korn Ferry Tour or PGA Tour Champions. In 2020, Harding Park became the first TPC course to host a major when it hosted the PGA Championship.

The flagship Tournament Players Club for the PGA Tour is TPC Sawgrass in Ponte Vedra Beach, Florida, designed in 1980 and now the headquarters of the PGA Tour. TPC courses are designed to accommodate the large crowds attracted to high-profile tournaments. One of the drivers for the development of the chain by the PGA Tour is that by holding tournaments on its own courses, it avoids sharing the proceeds with external course owners.

In 2007, the PGA Tour reached an agreement with Heritage Golf Group for the sale of four TPC courses; TPC Eagle Trace, TPC Michigan, TPC Piper Glen, and TPC Prestancia. Although they would be owned and operated by Heritage Golf Group, all would retain their TPC branding. In February 2008, TPC Tampa Bay became the fifth course to be bought by Heritage Golf Group, also retaining its TPC branding under a licensing agreement. In 2022, TPC River's Bend was purchased by Arcis Golf, with the club continuing as a TPC licensed property.

== Tournament Players Clubs ==
=== Resort/Daily Fee Courses ===
- TPC Colorado at Heron Lakes, Berthoud, Colorado
- TPC Deere Run, Silvis, Illinois
- TPC Danzante Bay, Loreto, Mexico
- TPC Dorado Beach, Dorado, Puerto Rico
- TPC Four Seasons Las Colinas, Irving, Texas
- TPC Harding Park, San Francisco, California
- TPC Las Vegas, Las Vegas, Nevada
- TPC Louisiana, New Orleans, Louisiana
- TPC Myrtle Beach, Myrtle Beach, South Carolina
- TPC San Antonio, San Antonio, Texas
  - AT&T Canyons Course, designed by Pete Dye and PGA Tour player consultant Bruce Lietzke
  - AT&T Oaks Course, designed by Greg Norman and PGA Tour player consultant Sergio García
- TPC Sawgrass, Ponte Vedra Beach, Florida
  - THE PLAYERS Stadium Course
  - Dye's Valley Course
- TPC Scottsdale, Scottsdale, Arizona
  - Stadium Course
  - Champions Course
- TPC Tampa Bay, Lutz, Florida
- TPC Toronto at Osprey Valley, Caledon, Ontario, Canada
  - Heathlands Course
  - Hoot Course
  - North Course

=== Private courses ===
- TPC Boston, Norton, Massachusetts
- TPC Craig Ranch, McKinney, Texas
- TPC Houston, Sugar Land, Texas
- TPC Jasna Polana, Princeton, New Jersey
- TPC Kuala Lumpur, Kuala Lumpur, Malaysia
- TPC Michigan, Dearborn, Michigan
- TPC Monterey at Pasadera, Monterey, California
- TPC Piper Glen, Charlotte, North Carolina
- TPC Potomac at Avenel Farm, Potomac, Maryland
- TPC Prestancia, Sarasota, Florida
  - Stadium Course
  - Club Course
- TPC River Highlands, Cromwell, Connecticut
- TPC River's Bend, Cincinnati, Ohio
- TPC Southwind, Memphis, Tennessee
- TPC Sugarloaf, Duluth, Georgia
  - Meadows
  - Stables
  - Pines
- TPC Summerlin, Las Vegas, Nevada
- TPC Treviso Bay, Naples, Florida
- TPC Twin Cities, Blaine, Minnesota
- TPC Wisconsin, Madison, Wisconsin
