= PGA Tour 96 =

1995 video game

- Developers: Hitmen Productions (PS, PC, GEN); Unexpected Development (GB); NuFX (3DO, GEN); Ceris Software (GG); Halestorm, Inc. (SNES)
- Publishers: EA Sports; Black Pearl Software (Game Gear)
- Series: PGA Tour
- Platforms: PlayStation, Game Boy, 3DO, Sega Genesis, Game Gear, SNES, MS-DOS, Windows
- Release: September 23, 1995: PlayStation; NA: September 23, 1995; EU: November 1995 Game Boy, 3DO; NA: November 1995; EU: 1995 Sega Genesis; NA: November 1995; EU: December 1995 MS-DOS; WW: 1995 Game Gear; NA: 1996; EU: January 26, 1996 SNES; NA: January 1996; EU: March 28, 1996 Windows; NA: September 30, 1996; EU: 1996
- Genre: Sports
- Modes: Single-player, multiplayer

PGA Tour 96 is a sports video game developed by Hitmen Productions for the PlayStation, MS-DOS, Sega Genesis, and Windows versions, Unexpected Development for the Game Boy version, NuFX for the Sega Genesis and 3DO versions, Ceris Software for the Game Gear version, and Polygames for the SNES version and published by EA Sports for PlayStation, MS-DOS, Windows, Game Boy, Sega Genesis, 3DO, Game Gear, and SNES.

== Gameplay ==
It has fewer courses and golfers than previous installments. The game features 10 professional golfers as playable or as CPU opponents: Brad Faxon, Lee Janzen, Tom Kite, Bruce Lietzke, Davis Love III, Mark O'Meara, Peter Jacobsen, Jeff Sluman, Craig Stadler, and Fuzzy Zoeller. The featured courses are Spyglass Hill, TPC at Sawgrass, TPC at River Highlands (River Highlands is console only). The game has four modes: stroke play, match play, tournament mode, and practice mode. Golf clubs are assigned automatically by the caddie as the computer deems suitable for every lie and each situation.

== Reception ==
Reception

Review scores
Publication	Score
AllGame	4.5/5 (PC); 3.5/5 (SNES); 3.5/5 (3DO)
Electronic Gaming Monthly	8.75/10 (PS1)
Next Generation	3/5 (3DO, Genesis, PS1)
Maximum	2/5 (PS1)
CD Player	8/10 (PC)

Electronic Gaming Monthly's two sports reviewers gave the PlayStation version scores of 8.5 and 9.0 out of 10, remarking that it retained the excellent aspects of previous games in the series while dramatically improving on the graphics. They also felt that it successfully appealed to both novices and golfing pros. GamePro criticized it for having only two courses, but highly praised the precise level of control over each shot, selection of players, three dimensional terrain, and digitized sprites. They concluded that "With spectacular graphics and amazingly comprehensive controls, PGA Tour '96 immerses you in intense armchair golf." In contrast, Maximum called it "the weakest of the series yet". While they too approved of the ability to control every aspect of each shot, they felt the game was ruined by the unrealistic ball physics, particularly that balls stop dead with almost no rolling when they hit the ground, and putted balls halt suddenly instead of gradually slowing. Next Generation approved of the game for its easy interface and numerous play options, though unlike GamePro and EGM, they found the graphics to be "a little on the underwhelming side" by the standards of current generation consoles.

Reviewing the 3DO version, Johnny Ballgame of GamePro commented, "If you thought golf was boring, think again." He was pleased with the selection of modes, accurate controls, and sound, and said that the graphics, though slightly grainier than in the PlayStation version, are stunningly lifelike in absolute terms. A reviewer for Next Generation found the game was an effective "jump in and play" experience, but lacked the realism and level of content that serious golfers would expect from a golf video game.

Air Hendrix of GamePro remarked, "EA Sports tried to cram its marvelous PlayStation PGA game into a Genesis cart, and it just didn't fit." In addition to the inferior graphics and slow screen redrawing, he criticized the absence of the shot-planning features seen in the PlayStation version and previous iterations on the Genesis, saying this makes it impossible to precisely calculate one's shots. He gave the SNES version an indifferent review, saying it fails to outdo the Genesis's PGA Tour Golf III, due to the weak audio and absence of features like backspin and 3D terrain, but is superior to the Genesis version of the game and makes an overall "good round of golf". He praised the detailed backgrounds and fluid movements. GamePro's Scary Larry praised the Game Boy version as offering good options, graphics, sounds, and most importantly, an appealing "plug-and-play" style. He was less pleased with the Game Gear version, saying that the graphics and presentation enhancements serve mainly to slow the game down with heavy screen redraw.

Next Generation reviewed the Genesis version of the game, and stated that "if you haven't sampled any of the PGA series, it is still the best golf game available for the 16-bit machines and a fine addition to your library."

PGA Tour 96 was named one of the top 100 CD-ROMs by PC Magazine.
