= PGA Tour Golf II =

1993 video game

- Developer: Polygames
- Publishers: EA Sports; Time Warner Interactive (GG)
- Series: PGA Tour
- Platforms: Genesis, Game Gear
- Release: Genesis: NA: January 1993; EU: February 19, 1993; Game Gear: NA: 1995; EU: 1995
- Genre: Sports (golf)
- Modes: Single-player, multiplayer

PGA Tour Golf II is a golf video game developed by American studio Polygames and published by EA Sports for Sega Genesis in 1993 and Time Warner Interactive for Game Gear in 1995.

== Playable courses ==
The game features the courses of TPC at Avenel, TPC at Sawgrass, TPC at Southwind, TPC of Scottsdale, TPC at Eagle Trace, and PGA West Stadium.

== Playable characters ==
The Game Gear version features 4 professional golfers as playable or as CPU opponents: Paul Azinger, Craig Stadler, Fuzzy Zoeller and Fred Couples. The Genesis version features an additional 6 professional golfers (for a total of 10): Tommy Armour III, Bruce Lietzke, Mark McCumber, Mark O'Meara, Larry Mize and Joey Sindelar.

== Reception ==
The Mega Drive version knocked Ecco the Dolphin from the top of the sales charts in the United Kingdom. It went on to sell 200,000 copies in the country during 1993, ranking as the tenth best-selling home video game of the year. MegaTech gave the game 94% and a Hyper Game award, praising the number of features and the control method. Computer Gaming World in July 1994 said that the Macintosh version's graphics were not as good as Links but much better than the PC version's. Citing its emphasis on simulation, the magazine concluded that "Unlike many sequels, this actually adds to the genre". Reviewing the Game Gear version, GamePro praised the screen layout, controls, and detailed graphics, but criticized the long loading times, weak sound effects, and music.
