= Tiger Woods PGA Tour 2001 =

2000 video game

- North American PS2 cover art
- Developers: Headgate Studios (PC); Stormfront Studios (PS); EA Redwood Shores (PS2)
- Publisher: EA Sports
- Series: PGA Tour
- Platforms: Microsoft Windows, PlayStation, PlayStation 2
- Release: Windows: NA: November 7, 2000; EU: December 8, 2000; PlayStation: NA: November 14, 2000; EU: December 8, 2000; PlayStation 2: NA: February 27, 2001; EU: April 20, 2001
- Genre: Sports
- Modes: Single-player, multiplayer

Tiger Woods PGA Tour 2001 (also known as Tiger Woods PGA Tour Golf for the PlayStation version) is a sports video game developed by Headgate Studios for the Microsoft Windows version, Stormfront Studios for the PlayStation version, and EA Redwood Shores for the PlayStation 2 version, and published by EA Sports for Windows and PlayStation in 2000 and PlayStation 2 in 2001. The latter console version was later published in Japan by Electronic Arts Square on June 21, 2001.

== Reception ==
Reception

Aggregate score
Aggregator	Score		
Aggregator	PC	PS	PS2
Metacritic	65/100	65/100	74/100

Review scores
Publication	Score		
Publication	PC	PS	PS2
AllGame	N/A	N/A	3.5/5
CNET Gamecenter	7/10	N/A	N/A
Computer Games Strategy Plus	1.5/5	N/A	N/A
Computer Gaming World	3/5	N/A	N/A
Electronic Gaming Monthly	N/A	6.17/10 (Note: In Electronic Gaming Monthly's review of the PlayStation version, one critic gave it a score of 5.5/10, and the rest gave it each a score of 6.5/10.)	6.67/10
Game Informer	N/A	8/10	6/10
GamePro	N/A	4/5	3.5/5
GameSpot	7.9/10	5.4/10	5.5/10
GameSpy	77%	N/A	85%
GameZone	N/A	7/10	N/A
IGN	7.5/10	6.7/10	7.8/10
Official U.S. PlayStation Magazine	N/A	3.5/5	3/5
PC Gamer (US)	38%	N/A	N/A
X-Play	N/A	N/A	3/5
The Cincinnati Enquirer	4/5	N/A	N/A
Maxim	N/A	N/A	8/10

The game received "mixed or average reviews" on all platforms according to video game review aggregator Metacritic.

The PC version sold 230,000 units in the U.S. and earned $5.5 million by August 2006, after its release in November 2000. It was the country's 92nd best-selling computer game during this period.
