= Tiger Woods PGA Tour 14 =

2013 video game

- Developer: EA Tiburon
- Publisher: EA Sports
- Series: PGA Tour
- Platforms: PlayStation 3 Xbox 360
- Release: NA: March 26, 2013; PAL: March 28, 2013
- Genre: Sports
- Modes: Single-player, multiplayer

Tiger Woods PGA Tour 14 is a sports video game developed by EA Tiburon and published by EA Sports for Xbox 360 and PlayStation 3. It is the last game featuring Tiger Woods in the title for the video game series.

== Features ==
Tiger Woods PGA Tour 14 includes Legends of the Majors mode, where players are able to compete in tournaments from the 1870s to the present day. Equipment physics and player outfits are changed to simulate the conditions and differences of each era. LPGA events such as the Kraft Nabisco Championship were introduced to Career mode for the first time, and all four Men's major golf championships appear as well. Country clubs will now be able to house up to 100 members, and a customizable day/night cycle is included. A new "Quick Tournament" mode was also added, which simulates only the final round of a tournament.

For the first time in the series, Tiger Woods PGA Tour 14 adds support for tournament playoffs. Tiburon's developers considered playoff support to be "long overdue", as each men's major uses a different playoff format. Due to complex player licensing and outcomes for playoffs, the strokes of other players are not shown.

The cover athletes for the North American version of Tiger Woods PGA Tour 14 are Tiger Woods and Arnold Palmer. The European case features Seve Ballesteros and Rory McIlroy alongside Woods. All are playable in the game, along with over 25 other golfers including first-timers Keegan Bradley, Bud Cauley, Stacy Lewis, and Lexi Thompson. Tiger Woods PGA Tour 14 Standard Edition includes 20 courses with the main game. The Masters Historic Edition of game has an additional six courses. More courses were released as downloadable content. Tiger Woods PGA Tour 14 features 21 officially licensed PGA Tour and LPGA Tour tournaments.

== Reception ==
Reception

Aggregate score
Aggregator	Score	
Aggregator	PS3	Xbox 360
Metacritic	74/100	77/100

Review scores
Publication	Score	
Publication	PS3	Xbox 360
Destructoid	7/10	N/A
Electronic Gaming Monthly	N/A	8/10
Game Informer	8.5/10	8.5/10
GameRevolution	N/A	4/5
GameSpot	7.5/10	7.5/10
GamesRadar+	N/A	4/5
IGN	8/10	8/10
Joystiq	N/A	3.5/5
PlayStation Official Magazine – UK	7/10	N/A
Official Xbox Magazine (US)	N/A	8/10
Digital Spy	4/5	N/A
The Guardian	4/5	N/A

Tiger Woods PGA Tour 14 received "mixed or average" and "generally favorable" reviews, according to review aggregator Metacritic.

Digital Spy gave the PlayStation 3 version a score of four stars out of five and called it "a very good golf game, which clearly improves on last year's effort without drastically altering the experience. With more courses, golfers, improved swing styles, a better story mode and increased online options, it would be hard not to recommend the game to golfing fans." The Guardian gave the same version a similar score of four stars out of five, saying, "This year builds on that quiet evolution but also brings a wealth of new and exciting additions, with its Legends of the Majors mode alone making it a worthwhile purchase." National Post, however, gave the same version a score of 7.5 out of 10, saying, "There's little question Tiger Woods PGA Tour 14 is the deepest and most authentic golf simulation currently available... Just keep in mind that the scope of its alterations and enhancements is better analogized as a chip shot than a John Daly-sized drive."

The Digital Fix gave the Xbox 360 version a score of 7 out of 10, stating, "If you are a fan of the franchise then you know what you are getting with a new version and if you are a newbie then this is as good a place as any to start." The Daily Telegraph gave the same version three stars out of five, stating, "To EA's credit, Tiger Woods PGA Tour 14 --like all the PGA Tour games before it-- is still a very good game. But perhaps the imminent next generation of consoles will see the series receiving the overhaul it needs."

StadiumTalk.com ranked the game 31st in its countdown of top 50 sports video games of all time, ranking behind other golf titles such as Tiger Woods PGA Tour 12 (2011, 21st), PGA Tour Golf (1990, 19th), and Tiger Woods PGA Tour 2004 (4th).
