= PGA Tour (video game series) =

Series of golf video games

- Current logo
- Genre: Sports
- Developers: Sterling Silver Software; Polygon Games; Hitmen Productions; Unexpected Development; NuFX; Ceris Software; Adrenalin Entertainment; EA Redwood Shores; Xantera; Rainbow Studios; Headgate Studios; Stormfront Studios; Rebellion Developments; Backbone Emeryville; Sensory Sweep Studios; EA Canada; Team Fusion; EA Tiburon; Exient Entertainment; HB Studios
- Publisher: EA Sports
- Platforms: MS-DOS, Sega Genesis, Amiga, Macintosh, SNES, Master System, Game Gear, PlayStation, Game Boy, 3DO, Sega Saturn, Microsoft Windows, Game Boy Color, PlayStation 2, Game Boy Advance, Xbox, GameCube, Mac OS, N-Gage, Nintendo DS, PlayStation Portable, Mac OS X, Xbox 360, PlayStation 3, Wii, iOS, PlayStation 4, Xbox One, PlayStation 5, Xbox Series X and S
- First release: PGA Tour Golf; 1990
- Latest release: EA Sports PGA Tour; April 7, 2023

PGA Tour is a series of golf video games developed and published by Electronic Arts - and later their EA Sports sub-label - since 1990. The series primarily features courses featured on the U.S. PGA Tour, and other notable courses (such as those that have hosted majors).

In 1998, EA began publishing their golf games with the endorsement of Tiger Woods. Following the Tiger Woods 99 PGA Tour Golf release, subsequent titles were named Tiger Woods PGA Tour and released yearly.

Although EA Sports developed most games in the series internally, some SKUs have come from outside developers including the first edition, Tiger Woods 99 PGA Tour Golf, which Adrenalin Entertainment developed in conjunction with EA for the PlayStation and Tiger Woods PGA Tour 2001 for the PlayStation, which was developed by Stormfront Studios. IOMO also produced versions of the game for mobile phones for the 2002, 2004, and 2005 editions.

In October 2013, EA ended its relationship with Woods, being replaced with Rory McIlroy, then top golfer in the world, who became the new title athlete of the franchise. The game, Rory McIlroy PGA Tour, was released in 2015.

The series was responsible for several innovations in the genre, such as the now standard three-click swing method. In 1995 a critic stated in GamePro that "The PGA series flies high above the rest for two reasons: You can completely control a shot, and you play on the best courses around." However, unlike other games in the EA Sports label, the series was often shadowed by other competitors such as the Jack Nicklaus series, Links series, Microsoft Golf or The Golf Pro.

PGA Tour has brought in almost $771 million during the time it was named for Tiger Woods from 1999 to 2013.

== History ==
=== Tiger Woods ===
Starting in 1998, Tiger Woods was the star and face of the series. The deal with Woods was worth $6.2 to 7 million a year at the height of his 15 years at EA Sports.

Both parties had agreed to incorporate the Masters into a video game for several years, but Augusta National Golf Club agreed only when the presentation and playability of the course was perfect. It took EA Tiburon's 80-person development team three years of work from 2009 to 2011 to make Augusta National available in Tiger Woods PGA Tour 12.

In January 2012, EA announced that there would be no more releases on the Wii, with the Xbox 360 and PlayStation 3 editions would continue to receive new online and social features. They also said that the Xbox 360's Kinect and the PlayStation 3's PlayStation Move have both made "significant advances in motion gaming."

In February 2013, EA announced that there will be no Wii U version of Tiger Woods PGA Tour.

=== Rory Mcllroy ===
According to Kotaku, Electronic Arts reportedly planned to outsource Tiger Woods PGA Tour 15 and give the in-house team at EA Tiburon two years to make Tiger Woods PGA Tour 16 for the PlayStation 4 and Xbox One (the title would see release as Rory McIlroy PGA Tour). However, when CEO John Riccitiello resigned March 2013, this plan was dropped to save costs.

In October 2013, EA's partnership with Woods and a licensing agreement with Augusta National Golf Club reached an end. According to EA, the split is a mutual decision.

The agreement with HB Studios comes after a similar long-term licensing agreement between the PGA Tour and Electronic Arts came to an end. EA had dominated electronic golf games thanks to a partnership with 15-time major tournament winner Tiger Woods. From 1999 to 2013 Tiger Woods PGA Tour was the top video golf game on the market. After EA and Woods ended their agreement in 2013, EA developed a similar game in 2015 in a partnership with Rory McIlroy. Rory McIlroy PGA Tour, running on the Frostbite engine, did not fare nearly as well as the previous EA versions featuring Woods. The game was pulled from all digital storefronts in May 2018.

In September 2018, EA relinquished its agreement with the PGA Tour in what appears to be a move away from golf games. In August 2018, PGA Tour licensing director Matt Iofredo said the new partnership with HB Studios is part of the sport's on-going efforts to introduce golf to a wider audience.

=== EA's return to the PGA Tour ===
On March 29, 2021, EA announced a new golf video game was in development. The game would use the Frostbite engine and was announced as EA Sports PGA Tour. The game takes advantage of next-generation technology. This will be through a new long-term agreement signed this year with the PGA TOUR.

EA announced on April 7, 2021, a day before the 2021 Masters, that the Masters and its home, Augusta National Golf Club in Augusta, Georgia, will be playable exclusively in EA Sports PGA Tour. It would be released under the name EA Sports PGA Tour: Road to the Masters and along with the Masters event, EA Sports PGA Tour will feature the PGA Championship, the U.S. Open and the Open Championship, making it the only video game to feature all four major men's professional golf tournaments.

Facing pressure from 2K's recent releases, EA announced further innovations would be introduced in EA Sports PGA Tour, one of which was scanning each golf course via aerial means; this was demonstrated with the Augusta National course. On May 17, 2021, a delay was announced pushing the title's release date a year later to coincide with the 2022 Masters' Tournament, before removing its release date by November 2021.

On March 22, 2022, Electronic Arts announced the delay of EA Sports PGA Tour by one year to spring 2023. EA did not give a reason for the delay, nor did they announce the game's platforms; on January 19, 2023, a gameplay trailer was released alongside a release date of March 24, 2023, releasing on PlayStation 5, Xbox Series X and Series S, and Microsoft Windows. Further delays were announced on March 3, 2023, with the game releasing on the week of the Masters Tournament, with an early access release on Tuesday, April 4, and a worldwide launch on Friday, April 7, allowing the developers, EA Tiburon, to polish the game further before launch.

=== Course scanning ===
During development of Tiger Woods PGA Tour 10, in order to scan and faithfully reproduce the golf courses, the developers spent seven to ten days on each of the game's 16 courses and used a 3D laser scanner made by Leica. The developers took the equipment to each hole and placed it and did a 360-degree scan of the entire course to map the terrain of each hole with a high level of accuracy that allows the player to "play the hole and the course exactly as [they] would in real life."

The development of Tiger Woods PGA Tour 12 saw the usage of a new state-of-the-art laser scanning technology that took 10 days at Augusta National Golf Club to laser scan every hole in the game, allowing for significantly higher detail than in the previous titles.

The development of EA Sports PGA Tour saw the usage of custom LiDAR helicopter flights over each of the game's courses, flying scans at lower altitudes and slower speeds to achieve a greater density of data points and a higher level of realism than scans from public sources. And they meticulously mapped the courses, using advanced technologies such as photogrammetry, drone technology and GPS for high accuracy.

== Games ==
Aggregate review scores
Game	Metacritic
PGA Tour Golf	(GEN) 71% (Note: GameRankings score) (PC) 82% (SNES) 58%
PGA Tour Golf II	(GEN) 60%
PGA Tour Golf III	(GEN) -
PGA Tour 96	(3DO) 90% (PS1) 87%
PGA Tour 97	(PS1) 63% (SAT) 67%
PGA Tour 98	(PS1) 70%
Tiger Woods 99 PGA Tour Golf	(PC) 76% (PS1) 73%
Tiger Woods PGA Tour 2000	(GBC) 66% (PC) 67% (PS1) 72%
Tiger Woods PGA Tour 2001	(PC) 65/100 (PS1) 65/100 (PS2) 74/100
Tiger Woods PGA Tour 2002	(GBA) 52% (PC) 83/100 (PS2) 80/100
Tiger Woods PGA Tour 2003	(GC) 90/100 (PC) 92/100 (PS2) 88/100 (Xbox) 88/100
Tiger Woods PGA Tour 2004	(GBA) 75/100 (GC) 89/100 (PC) 88/100 (PS2) 89/100 (Xbox) 89/100
Tiger Woods PGA Tour 2005	(NDS) 64/100 (GC) 88/100 (PC) 91/100 (PS2) 88/100 (PSP) 78/100 (Xbox) 88/100
Tiger Woods PGA Tour 06	(GC) 82/100 (PC) 81/100 (PS2) 83/100 (PSP) 80/100 (Xbox) 81/100 (X360) 71/100
Tiger Woods PGA Tour 07	(PC) 73/100 (PS2) 79/100 (PS3) 81/100 (PSP) 78/100 (Wii) 71/100 (Xbox) 81/100 (X360) 80/100
Tiger Woods PGA Tour 08	(NDS) 81/100 (PC) 61/100 (PS2) 65/100 (PS3) 79/100 (PSP) 72/100 (Wii) 72/100 (X360) 80/100
Tiger Woods PGA Tour 09	(PS3) 82/100 (PSP) 53/100 (Wii) 81/100 (X360) 84/100
Tiger Woods PGA Tour 10	(PS3) 81/100 (PSP) 70/100 (Wii) 88/100 (X360) 80/100
Tiger Woods PGA Tour 11	(PS3) 78/100 (Wii) 84/100 (X360) 79/100
Tiger Woods PGA Tour 12	(PC) 43/100 (PS3) 80/100 (Wii) 85/100 (X360) 80/100
Tiger Woods PGA Tour 13	(PS3) 75/100 (X360) 77/100
Tiger Woods PGA Tour 14	(PS3) 74/100 (X360) 77/100
Rory McIlroy PGA Tour	(PS4) 61/100 (XONE) 60/100
EA Sports PGA Tour	(PC) 72/100 (PS5) 76/100 (XSXS) 74/100

=== PGA Tour Golf (1990) ===
Information needed

=== PGA Tour Golf II (1993) ===
Information needed

=== PGA Tour Golf III (1994) ===
Information needed

=== PGA Tour 96 (1995) ===
Information needed

=== PGA Tour 97 (1996) ===
Information needed

=== PGA Tour 98 (1997) ===
Information needed

=== Tiger Woods 99 PGA Tour Golf (1998) ===
Information needed

=== Tiger Woods PGA Tour 2000 (1999) ===
Information needed

=== Tiger Woods PGA Tour 2001 (2000) ===
Information needed

=== Tiger Woods PGA Tour 2002 (2001) ===
Information needed

=== Tiger Woods PGA Tour 2003 (2002) ===
Information needed

=== Tiger Woods PGA Tour 2004 (2003) ===
Information needed

=== Tiger Woods PGA Tour 2005 (2004) ===
Information needed

=== Tiger Woods PGA Tour 06 (2005) ===
Information needed

=== Tiger Woods PGA Tour 07 (2006) ===
Information needed

=== Tiger Woods PGA Tour 08 (2007) ===
Information needed

=== Tiger Woods PGA Tour 09 (2008) ===
Information needed

=== Tiger Woods PGA Tour 10 (2009) ===
Information needed

=== Tiger Woods PGA Tour 11 (2010) ===
Information needed

=== Tiger Woods PGA Tour 12 (2011) ===
Information needed

=== Tiger Woods PGA Tour 13 (2012) ===
Information needed

=== Tiger Woods PGA Tour 14 (2013) ===
Information needed

=== Rory McIlroy PGA Tour (2015) ===
Rory Mcllroy PGA Tour was released for PlayStation 4 and Xbox One on July 14, 2015, and is notable for being the first EA Sports game to run on the Frostbite engine. Following a hiatus after the release of the previous title, EA announced that PGA Tour 14 was the last to feature Tiger Woods as the title athlete, replacing him with Rory McIlroy

=== EA Sports PGA Tour (2023) ===
EA Sports PGA Tour was released for Microsoft Windows, PlayStation 5 and Xbox Series X and Series S on April 7, 2023.

== Other titles ==
=== PGA European Tour (1994) ===
Developed and published by Electronic Arts for the Amiga, Sega Genesis, and Amiga CD32 in 1994, for the Game Boy in 1995, and for the SNES and MS-DOS in 1996. The SNES version supports the TeeV Golf club peripheral.

GamePro gave the Game Boy version a rave review, saying that it "delivers almost everything that made its 16-bit relative the best." They applauded the selection of courses, effective controls, strong realism, and the graphics, going so far as to state that when played on the Super Game Boy the game looks "almost as good as the Genesis version."

=== PGA Tour Pro (1997) ===
Developed by EA Sports and published by Electronic Arts for Windows PC in 1997.

The game received a score of 5.8 ("mediocre") from GameSpot.

=== PGA European Tour (1999) ===
Developed by Gremlin Interactive and published by Infogrames for the PlayStation in 1999 and Nintendo 64 in 2000.

=== Senior PGA Tour Golf (1999) ===
Developed by EA Sports and published by Electronic Arts for Windows PC in 1999.

The game received a score of 3.5 out of 5 from AllGame.

=== Tiger Woods PGA Tour a.k.a. Tiger Woods PGA Tour Mobile (2009) ===
Developed by Exient Entertainment and published by Electronic Arts under the EA Sports branding on April 23, 2009, for iOS. The game features commentary by Sam Torrance and Kelly Tilghman. The game offers five golfers: Tiger Woods, Vijay Singh, Retief Goosen, Annika Sörenstam, and Natalie Gulbis. For courses, it has Pebble Beach Golf Links, Old Course at St Andrews, TPC Sawgrass, The K Club, Doral Golf Resort & Spa, Fancourt Links, and TPC Boston.

=== Tiger Woods PGA Tour Online (2010) ===
Tiger Woods PGA Tour Online was an online streaming version of the Tiger Woods franchise.

Players took part in single player modes or in tournaments. Tournaments were split into weekly and daily competitions, sometimes based on events then happening in the PGA Tour. For example, during the US Open, the courses that have had the US Open had a discount on points.

Players chose between monthly and yearly subscriptions with unlimited access, or chose to pay for individual rounds through microtransactions. Players who didn't subscribe were still allowed to compete, although they were usually allowed to play only one or two rounds each day.

On September 6, 2011, it became integrated with the Tiger Woods PGA Tour 12 PC version. EA Sports retired Tiger Woods PGA Tour Online on July 6, 2013.
