= List of interactive films =

This is a list of interactive films grouped by original year of release. Some are considered films, while others are considered video games.

== Pre-1970s ==
- Life Targets (1912)
- Auto Test (1954)
- Kinoautomat (1967)

== 1970s ==
- Wild Gunman (1974)
- EVR Race (1975)
- The Driver (1970s)

== 1980s ==
=== 1983 ===
- Astron Belt
- Bega's Battle (Genma Taisen)
- Cliff Hanger
- Cube Quest
- Dragon's Lair
- Interstellar
- Laser Grand Prix
- M.A.C.H. 3
- Space Ace
- Star Rider

=== 1984 ===
- ALBEGAS
- Badlands
- Cobra Command (Thunder Storm)
- Cosmos Circuit
- Deus Ex Machina
- Esh's Aurunmilla
- Firefox
- Ninja Hayate (Revenge of the Ninja)
- Super Don Quix-ote
- Thayer's Quest

=== 1985 ===
- Space Battleship Yamato
- Road Blaster
- Time Gal

=== 1987 ===
- Freedom Fighter (Escape From Cyber City)

=== 1988 ===
- Snatcher

=== 1989 ===
- Mean Streets

== 1990s ==
=== 1990 ===
- Mad Dog McCree

=== 1991 ===
- Alice: An Interactive Museum
- Dragon's Lair II: Time Warp
- It came from the Desert (TurboGrafx-CD version)
- Martian Memorandum
- Sherlock Holmes: Consulting Detective
- Time Traveler
- Who Shot Johnny Rock?

=== 1992 ===
- I'm Your Man
- L-Zone
- Mad Dog II: The Lost Gold
- Make My Video
- Night Trap
- Sewer Shark
- Sherlock Holmes: Consulting Detective Vol. II
- Space Pirates

=== 1993 ===
- Crime Patrol
- Double Switch
- Dracula Unleashed
- Gadget: Invention, Travel, & Adventure
- Ground Zero: Texas
- Iron Helix
- Lost in Time
- Mansion of Hidden Souls
- Microcosm
- Prize Fighter
- Quantum Gate
- Sherlock Holmes: Consulting Detective Vol. III
- Star Wars: Rebel Assault
- Surgical Strike
- The 7th Guest
- The Lawnmower Man
- Voyeur

=== 1994 ===
- Bloodwings: Pumpkinhead's Revenge
- Burn:Cycle
- Cadillacs and Dinosaurs: The Second Cataclysm
- Corpse Killer
- Creature Shock
- Crime Patrol 2: Drug Wars
- Critical Path
- Cyberia
- Cyberwar
- Flash Traffic: City of Angels
- J.B. Harold: Blue Chicago Blues
- Jurassic Park
- The Masked Rider: Kamen Rider ZO
- Loadstar: The Legend of Tully Bodine
- Novastorm
- Policenauts
- The Last Bounty Hunter
- Tomcat Alley
- Under a Killing Moon (part of the Tex Murphy series)
- Vortex

=== 1995 ===
- BioForge
- Brain Dead 13
- Chaos Control
- Connections
- Cyberia 2: Resurrection
- Cyclemania
- D
- Daryl F. Gates' Police Quest: SWAT
- Demolition Man - version for 3DO Interactive Multiplayer console
- Fahrenheit
- Frankenstein: Through the Eyes of the Monster
- Ghostly Desires
- In the 1st Degree
- Johnny Mnemonic: The Interactive Action Movie
- Kingdom II: Shadoan
- McKenzie & Co
- Midnight Raiders
- Mighty Morphin' Power Rangers
- Mr. Payback: An Interactive Movie
- Panic in the Park
- Phantasmagoria
- Psychic Detective
- Quarterback Attack
- Silent Steel
- Slam City with Scottie Pippen
- Star Wars: Rebel Assault II: The Hidden Empire
- Street Fighter II Movie - An interactive movie based on Street Fighter II: The Animated Movie released only in Japan for the PlayStation and Sega Saturn.
- Supreme Warrior
- The 11th Hour
- The Beast Within: A Gabriel Knight Mystery
- The Daedalus Encounter
- Wirehead

=== 1996 ===
- Angel Devoid
- Bad Mojo
- Enemy Zero
- Fox Hunt
- Goosebumps: Escape from Horrorland
- Hardline
- Harvester
- Mind Grind
- Mummy: Tomb of the Pharaoh
- Noir: A Shadowy Thriller
- Phantasmagoria: A Puzzle of Flesh
- Realms of the Haunting
- Ripper
- Solar Crusade
- Spycraft
- Star Trek: Borg
- Star Trek: Klingon
- Terra Nova: Strike Force Centauri
- The Pandora Directive (part of the Tex Murphy series)
- Toonstruck
- Urban Runner
- Vampire Diaries
- Voyeur II
- Devo Presents Adventures of the Smart Patrol (video game)

=== 1997 ===
- A Fork in the Tale
- Blue Heat: The Case of the Cover Girl Murders
- Byzantine: The Betrayal
- Eraser: Turnabout
- Lands of Lore: Guardians of Destiny
- Riana Rouge
- Temüjin
- The Last Express

=== 1998 ===
- Alive
- Black Dahlia
- Dark Side of the Moon: A Sci-Fi Adventure
- Machi
- Super Adventure Rockman
- Tender Loving Care
- Tex Murphy: Overseer
- The X-Files Game

== 2000s ==
=== 2000 ===
- Love Story
- Star Strike

=== 2003 ===
- Conspiracies

=== 2004 ===
- The Guy Game

=== 2005 ===
- Doctor Who: Attack of the Graske
- Façade
- Fahrenheit
- School Days

=== 2006 ===
- Dreamfall: The Longest Journey
- Railfan: Chicago Transit Authority Brown Line
- Yoomurjak's Ring original Hungarian release
- Choose Your Own Adventure: The Abominable Snowman
- Final Destination 3

=== 2007 ===
- Railfan: Taiwan High Speed Rail
- The Act
- Return to House on Haunted Hill

=== 2008 ===
- 428: Shibuya Scramble
- Casebook
- Crimeface
- Mystery Case Files: Dire Grove

=== 2009 ===
- Playmobil: The Secret of Pirate Island

== 2010s ==
=== 2010 ===
- Darkstar: The Interactive Movie
- Heavy Rain
- Mystery Case Files: 13th Skull
- Doctor Who: The Adventure Games

=== 2011 ===
- Conspiracies II – Lethal Networks
- I Am Playr
- Jurassic Park: The Game
- Take This Lollipop

=== 2012 ===
- The Oogieloves in the Big Balloon Adventure
- The Silver Nugget
- The Walking Dead

=== 2013 ===
- Bear Stearns Bravo
- Beyond: Two Souls
- The Stanley Parable
- The Walking Dead: Season Two
- The Wolf Among Us
- Kentucky Route Zero
- The Novelist

=== 2014 ===
- A Bird Story
- D4: Dark Dreams Don't Die
- Game of Thrones
- Tesla Effect: A Tex Murphy Adventure
- Tales from the Borderlands

=== 2015 ===
- The Beginner's Guide
- Contradiction: Spot the Liar!
- Dreamfall Chapters: The Longest Journey
- Her Story
- Life Is Strange
- Minecraft: Story Mode
- Until Dawn

=== 2016 ===
- Batman: The Telltale Series
- The Bunker
- 1979 Revolution: Black Friday
- The Verdict
- The Walking Dead: Michonne
- The Walking Dead: Season Three

=== 2017 ===
- Guardians of the Galaxy: The Telltale Series
- Late Shift
- Minecraft: Story Mode – Season Two
- Batman: The Enemy Within
- Life Is Strange: Before the Storm
- Planet of the Apes: Last Frontier
- Hidden Agenda
- The Infectious Madness of Doctor Dekker

=== 2018 ===
- The Awesome Adventures of Captain Spirit
- Black Mirror: Bandersnatch
- Detroit: Become Human
- Life Is Strange 2
- The Quiet Man
- The Shapeshifting Detective
- Steins;Gate Elite
- The Walking Dead: The Final Season

=== 2019 ===
- The Dark Pictures Anthology: Man of Medan
- Telling Lies
- She Sees Red
- Erica
- A Heist with Markiplier

== 2020s ==
=== 2020 ===
- Unbreakable Kimmy Schmidt: Kimmy vs the Reverend
- Tell Me Why
- Death Come True
- Dark Nights with Poe and Munro
- The Dark Pictures Anthology: Little Hope
- Batman: Death in the Family (short film)
- Twin Mirror
- Five Dates
- The Complex

=== 2021 ===
- Life Is Strange: True Colors
- The Dark Pictures Anthology: House of Ashes
- American Hero
- Lake
- Road 96
- Twelve Minutes
- I Saw Black Clouds
- Night Book
- Bloodshore

=== 2022 ===
- As Dusk Falls
- Cat Burglar
- Immortality
- Not For Broadcast
- The Quarry
- Who Pressed Mute on Uncle Marcus?

=== 2023 ===
- Choose Love
- Ten Dates
- Mia and the Dragon Princess
- The Isle Tide Hotel

=== 2025 ===
- Road to Empress
- Dead Reset

=== 2026 ===
- Heart of the Forest

== Upcoming ==
- Ghosts
