= Video games in Greece =

Greece represents a small fraction of the global video games market, ranking 50th in a list of 100 countries in the consumption of digital products. The country has long overlooked the prospect of sustaining a video games industry (and has even in the past attempted to ban all electronic games in public places through the controversial law 3037/2002), instead placing focus on retail sales of video games. In light of recent actions to encourage production and distribution of digital games, the country's emerging, but still largely fragmented games industry currently consists of over 25 active video game developer studios and several individual creators.

== Greek video games market ==
With a population of close to 11 million, Greece is a small market for video games. The Greek mainstream video games market yielded revenues of $112 million in 2017, while projections place the video game console market segment in Greece to amount to US$89m in 2020 (ranking 83rd in the world). The mobile gaming audience in Greece is similarly small, amounting to approximately 1.1 million active users, who represent 41% of internet users in the country. Mobile gaming is forecast to bring in close to US$40 million in revenue in 2020.

=== Distribution ===
CD Media, based in Athens, is the leading distributor in interactive entertainment software in South East Europe, as well as the local regional distribution representative of Nintendo of Europe for both Greece and the Balkans as of 2016.

=== Media ===
Greek-language online media have also covered video games, industry developments, and the local market in Greece, including Greek Video Games.

== Video game development ==
Greece is characterized by a small and largely fragmented video games market, consisting mostly of indie micro-enterprises and individual developers. Characteristic of this landscape is the fact that in 2013, it is estimated that only 120 people were working in the games industry at just 11 registered companies. As a result, the number of developers, artists, programmers and designers leaving the country to seek better job opportunities in Cyprus, the United Kingdom and the United States is significant.

The most prominent inhibiting factor undermining the growth of the Greek video gaming industry is the lack of funding, as investors shy away from video game development in the wake of the Greek government-debt crisis. As recent as 2019, the Greek government has introduced incentives for video game production. These include a 35% cash rebate (with no cap) as well as a 30% tax deduction for audio-visual productions.

=== Notable video game companies based in Greece ===
- Aventurine (defunct), developers of the massively multiplayer online role-playing game Darkfall.
- Icehole Games, developers of World Basketball Manager and 1821: The Struggle for Freedom.
- InterAction studios, developer of the Chicken Invaders series of shoot 'em up games.
- Total Eclipse Games, developers of The Clockwork Man hidden object adventure video game series.
- Tenebra Studios, independent video game development company having worked for the localization of Uncharted 2: Among Thieves, Uncharted 3: Drake's Deception and God of War III in Greek.
- Pixel Reign, developers of Robbie Swifthand and the Orb of Mysteries

=== Notable games developed in Greece ===
- Chicken Invaders by InterAction studios, one of the longest running series of games (first release in 1999) produced in Greece, with a dedicated worldwide fanbase and regular updates.
- Conspiracies by Anima Interactive, one of the earliest (2003) adventure games developed in Greece, followed by a 2011 sequel, Conspiracies II - Lethal Networks.
- Darkfall (followed by its sequel, Darkfall Unholy Wars) MMO game developed by Aventurine, the largest independent video game development studio to have operated in the country.
- World Basketball Manager series by Icehole Games, the longest-running series of games developed in Greece, and the first Greek video game series to be published, and to establish an audience outside the country.
- The Shore is a 2021 Lovecraftian horror adventure video game developed by Greek indie developer Ares Dragonis.
- The Sweet Treats Man! is a 2022 horror action short video game developed by Greek indie developer Stathis Tsasakos.
