= Ghostly Desires =

1995 erotic video game

- Developer(s): CPV Productions
- Publisher(s): Spice Interactive
- Platform(s): Windows, Macintosh
- Release: 1995

Ghostly Desires is an erotic, full-motion video, adventure video game developed by CPV Productions and published by Spice Interactive for Microsoft Windows and Macintosh in 1995. It was critically panned.

== Reception ==
Just Adventure negatively compared the game to Phantasmagoria, Kama Sutra, Druuna Morbis, Riana Rouge, and Erotica Island, describing it as a "blatant rip-off" of The 7th Guest with nude staff, where players walk from one porn scene to another; the reviewer ultimately gave the game an F rating. Quandaryland had similar sentiments, describing the game as an excuse to watch porn, giving it half a star.
