= Aventurine SA =

Independent video game developer

Aventurine - S.A.
- Native name: ΑΒΕΝΤΟΥΡΙΝ ΑΕ
- Type: Privately held company
- Industry: Video games
- Genre: Massively multiplayer online role-playing games
- Founded: 2003 (Note: The company was officially founded on 18 November 2002, according to the Greek General Commercial Register)
- Founder: Zad El Mehdawi, Tasos Flambouras, Spiros Iordanis
- Headquarters: Apostolou Pavlou 10B, Marousi 15123, Athens, Greece
- Key people: Costas Coucopoulos (CEO;CFO); El Mechntaoui Zant (CEO; President, 2010-2013); Anastasios Flambouras (VP, 2010-2013) Iordanis Spyridon (VP, 2010-2015); Lampadarios Konstantinos (Member of Board of directors, 2010-2013); El Mechntaoui Feirouz (Member of Board of directors, 2010-2013); Claus Grovdal (Game Design, 2003-2014); Vangelis Kalaitzis (Game Design); Al Stellakis (Writing); Henning Ludvigsen (Art Director, 2003-2010); Ricki Sickenger (Game Logic, 2003-2010); Kjetil Helland (Lead Programmer); Erik Sperling Johansen (Lead Server Programmer, 2003-2010); Thanasis Nikolopoulos (Programming); Jon Massey (Programming)
- Products: Darkfall, Darkfall Unholy Wars
- Services: Retail Sale & Wholesale of Computer Programs; Software Development(Video Games); Telematics Application; Interactive media Research; IT technology consulting
- Revenue: US$6'000'000 (Note: The revenue according to the company's page on Zoominfo.)
- Total equity: €2,374,113 (common shares)
- Number of employees: 48
- Website: Aventurine SA homepage

Aventurine SA (Greek: ΑΒΕΝΤΟΥΡΙΝ ΑΕ, romanized: AVENTOURIN AE) (Note: SA or S.A. is a type of limited company. For more information, refer to the Wikipedia article S.A. (corporation)) is a Greek independent video game developer and publisher founded in 2003, located in Athens, Greece. They are the developers of Darkfall, a massively multiplayer online role-playing game.

== History ==
In July 2000 Claus Grovdal, Kjetil Helland and Ricki Sickenger founded Razorwax AS in Oslo, Norway for the purpose of making online games. Soon they were joined by Erik Sperling Johansen and Henning Ludvigsen and in August 2001, they announced the development of Darkfall.

In 2002 the group relocated to join Zad El Mehdawi, Tasos Flambouras and Spiros Iordanis and found Aventurine SA in Athens, Greece, in order to continue developing Darkfall.

== Titles ==
=== Darkfall ===
Darkfall Online is sandbox MMORPG released on February 25, 2009 and was published in North America and Europe. Darkfall Online's servers shut down on November 15, 2012.

In the summer of 2008 it signed a deal with the Greek media and entertainment group, Audiovisual Enterprises, for the Darkfall distribution rights in Europe.

=== Darkfall Unholy Wars ===
Darkfall Unholy Wars is the sequel of Darkfall and was released on April 16, 2013 and discontinued in May, 2016.

In June 2012 Aventurine signed a deal with MGame Corporation, a Korean game publisher and developer, to release the new version of Darkfall to the Asian market.

== Technology ==
Aventurine's core technology consists of their independently created, real-time 3D engine.

== See also ==
- Video games in Greece
