= Mystery Case Files: MillionHeir =

2008 video game

- Developers: Big Fish Games; Griptonite Games
- Publisher: Nintendo
- Series: Mystery Case Files
- Platform: Nintendo DS
- Release: NA: September 8, 2008; AU: October 16, 2008; EU: February 6, 2009
- Genres: Adventure, puzzle
- Modes: Single-player, multiplayer

Mystery Case Files: MillionHeir is a puzzle adventure video game developed by Big Fish Games and Griptonite Games and published by Nintendo for the Nintendo DS. It was released in North America and Australia in 2008, and Europe in 2009. It is the second Mystery Case Files game to be made for a portable device.

== Gameplay ==
Apart from its single-player mode, the game has cooperative and multiplayer options when players have multiple copies of the game.

== Reception ==
The game received "mixed" reviews, according to video game review aggregator Metacritic.

IGN's Daemon Hatfield wrote that the game lacked personality but was fun as a limited activity. He felt that its "seek-and-find" gameplay would have tired quickly after much longer. Hatfield said that the game took full advantage of the Nintendo DS's unique features. He also praised the game's details, particularly the sound design, which he felt made the game world more enveloping. Hatfield gave the game a rating of 7.7/10.
