= Eraser: Turnabout =

1996 video game

- Developer: Imagination Pilots
- Publisher: Warner Bros.
- Platform: Windows
- Release: October 1996
- Genre: Action
- Mode: Single-player

Eraser: Turnabout is a 1996 video game developed by Imagination Pilots and published by Warner Bros. for Microsoft Windows. It is a licensed title based on the 1996 film Eraser, where players assume the role of protagonist John Krueger in events occurring after the events of the film. Krueger, who is not depicted by the film's actor Arnold Schwarzenegger, is tasked to protect individuals in witness protection, and locate and take out a leak in his organisation. Following release, the game received negative reviews.

== Gameplay ==
Gameplay screenshot

The game features separate action, interactive video and puzzle sequences. In the action sequences, players shoot enemies who appear against static backgrounds. Shooting is performed using the computer mouse to point and click at enemies before they shoot the player. In interactive video sequences, players navigate the interior of buildings in full motion video by selecting paths and avoiding dead ends or hazards that prematurely end the sequence. The game also features color and matching puzzles.

== Development ==
Development of Eraser: Turnabout was led by Chicago-based development studio Imagination Pilots and its founder Howard A. Tullman. Tullman stated the design of the game was intended to emulate interactive full motion video, with sequences featuring conversations that would react and respond to player choices. These sequences were directed by Ken Berris, who had similarly directed footage for Spycraft: The Great Game. The game was developed to take advantage of Intel's then-new MMX technology, which facilitated better performance of full motion video playback. The game's engine used MMX-enhanced Indeo Video Interactive codecs to play multiple video streams simultaneously without breaks in gameplay. It was shipped in October 1996.

== Reception ==
Reception

Review scores
Publication	Score
PC Games (DE)	23%
PC Action	40%
PC Player	76%
Power Play	28%

Eraser: Turnabout received mostly negative reviews. Writing that the game was neither real live-action nor a film, PC Games wrote that the game's sequences were poorly connected, featured long loading times and slow graphics, and incomprehensible puzzles. PC Action similarly critiqued the game for having little in common with the film, the "technically average" live action footage, and the "tedious" puzzles. Power Play dismissed the game as frustrating and lacking effort.
