= List of Playboy Playmates of 1996 =

The following is a list of Playboy Playmates of 1996. Playboy magazine names its Playmate of the Month each month throughout the year.

== January ==
Victoria Fuller

Personal details
- Born: Victoria Alynette Fuller; December 11, 1970 (age 55) Santa Barbara, California, United States
- Height: 5 ft 8 in (1.73 m)

Victoria Alynette Fuller (born December 11, 1970, in Santa Barbara, California, United States) is an American glamour model, artist, actress and reality TV contestant. She is Playboy magazine's Playmate of the Month for January 1996 and has appeared in Playboy Special Editions. Fuller posed for Playboy again in the May 2005 issue.

== February ==
Kona Carmack

Personal details
- Born: October 1, 1976 (age 50) Honolulu, Hawaii, United States
- Height: 5 ft 4 in (1.63 m)

Kona Carmack (born October 1, 1976, in Honolulu, Hawaii) is an American model and actress. She was born and raised in Honolulu. She is Playboy magazine's Playmate of the Month for February 1996. She is of Irish, Spanish, Filipino, Chinese, and Hawaiian descent. Carmack was a pre-med major at the University of North Carolina Wilmington (UNCW), then graduated from the University of Southern California Film School in December 2003. She worked in production for the TV series Deadwood and Monk. Carmack married TV personality Andrew Yani on December 27, 2003. The two divorced in 2004.

== March ==
Priscilla Taylor

Personal details
- Born: Priscilla Lee Inga Taylor; August 15, 1976 (age 50) Miami, Florida, United States
- Height: 5 ft 8 in (1.73 m)

Priscilla Lee Inga Taylor (born August 15, 1976 in Miami) is an American model and actress. She is Playboy magazine's Playmate of the Month for March 1996. Her centerfold was photographed by Richard Fegley.

== April ==
Gillian Bonner

Personal details
- Born: February 3, 1966 (age 60) Athens, Georgia, United States
- Height: 5 ft 6 in (168 cm)

Gillian Bonner (born February 3, 1966, in Athens, Georgia) is Playboy magazine's Playmate of the Month for April 1996. Her centerfold was photographed by Richard Fegley. She later went on to produce and star in the PC game Riana Rouge.

== May ==
Shauna Sand
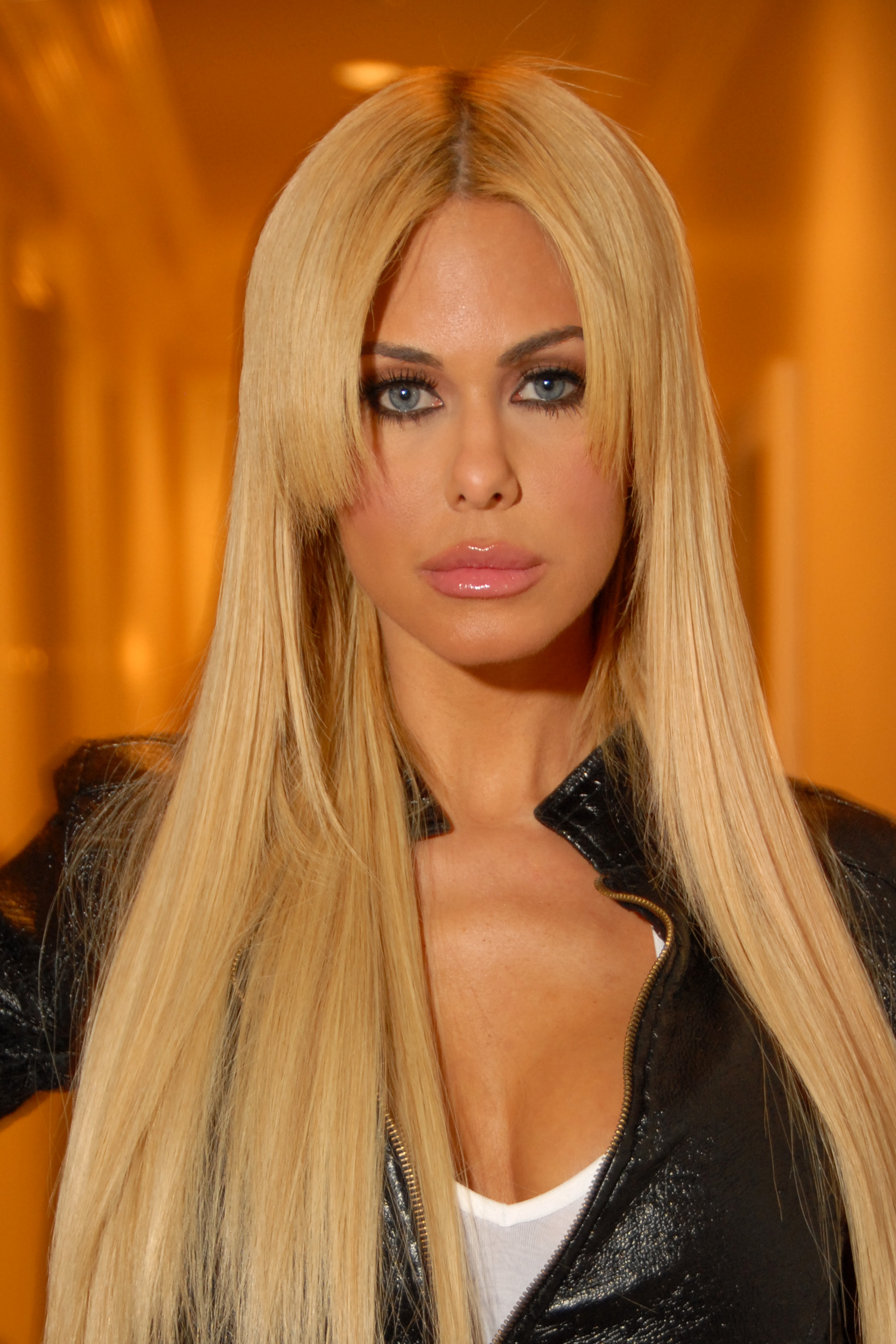
- Shauna Sand April 25, 2009

Personal details
- Born: September 2, 1971 (age 55) San Diego, California, United States
- Height: 5 ft 4 in (1.63 m)

Shauna Sand (born September 2, 1971, in San Diego, California) is an American model and actress. She is Playboy magazine's Playmate of the Month for May 1996 photographed by Stephen Wayda.

== June ==
Karin Katherine Taylor

Personal details
- Born: November 28, 1971 (age 54) Kingston, Jamaica
- Height: 5 ft 9 in (1.75 m)

Karin Katherine Taylor (born November 28, 1971) is a model and actress of Jamaican-Chinese and Brazilian heritage, chosen by Playboy as its Playmate of the Month for June 1996. Taylor also appeared on Malcolm and Eddie, Weird Al Show, Keenen Ivory Wayans Show, and Baywatch – in addition to guest hosting on E!.

== July ==
Angel Boris

Personal details
- Born: August 2, 1974 (age 52) Fort Lauderdale, Florida, United States
- Height: 5 ft 4 in (1.63 m)

Angel Lynn Boris (born August 2, 1974, in Fort Lauderdale, Florida) is an American model and actress sometimes credited as Angel Boris Reed. She appeared in a Playboy pictorial featuring the women of Hawaiian Tropic, and became Playboy's Playmate of the Month for July 1996. Her centerfold was photographed by Richard Fegley. Boris has also performed in films. television shows and music videos.

== August ==
Jessica Lee

Personal details
- Born: February 18, 1975 (age 51) Binghamton, New York, United States
- Height: 5 ft 5 in (1.65 m)

Jessica Lee (born February 18, 1975) is a model originally from Binghamton, New York. She is Playboys Playmate of the Month for August 1996.

== September ==
Jennifer Allan

Personal details
- Born: May 14, 1974 (age 52) Las Vegas, Nevada, United States
- Height: 5 ft 8 in (1.73 m)

Jennifer Lynn Allan was born on May 14, 1974 in Las Vegas, Nevada, US. She is Playboy's Playmate of the Month for September 1996. She has appeared in Playboy Special Editions as well as in Playboy videos.

== October ==
Nadine Chanz

Personal details
- Born: April 17, 1972 (age 54) Hildesheim, West Germany
- Height: 5 ft 6 in (1.68 m)

Nadine Chanz (alternate spelling Nadine Tchanz, originally Nadine Tschanz) (born April 17, 1972, in Hildesheim, West Germany) is a German model and actress. She is Playboy magazine's Playmate of the Month for October 1996.

== November ==
Ulrika Ericsson
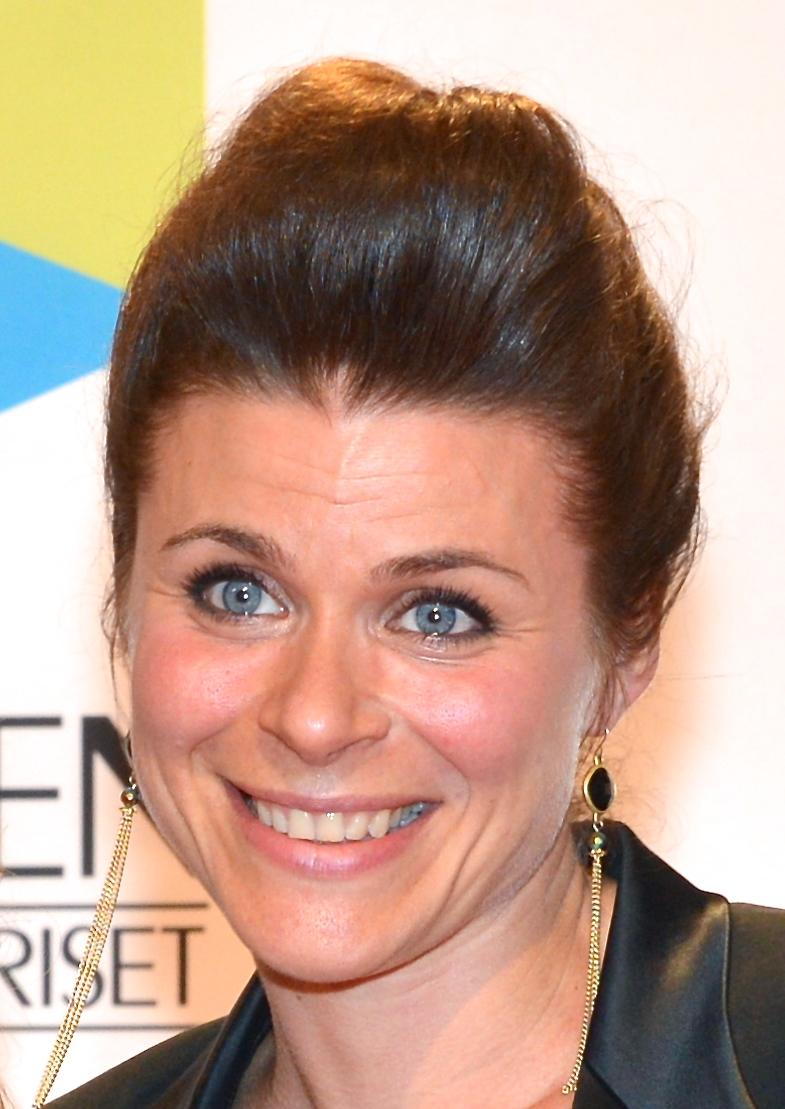

Personal details
- Born: September 10, 1970 (age 56) Gävle, Sweden
- Height: 5 ft 7 in (1.70 m)

Ulrika Ericsson (born Anna Ulrika Eriksson on September 10, 1970, in Gävle, Gävleborg County) is a Swedish model and actress. She is Playboy's Playmate of the Month for November 1996.

== December ==
Victoria Silvstedt
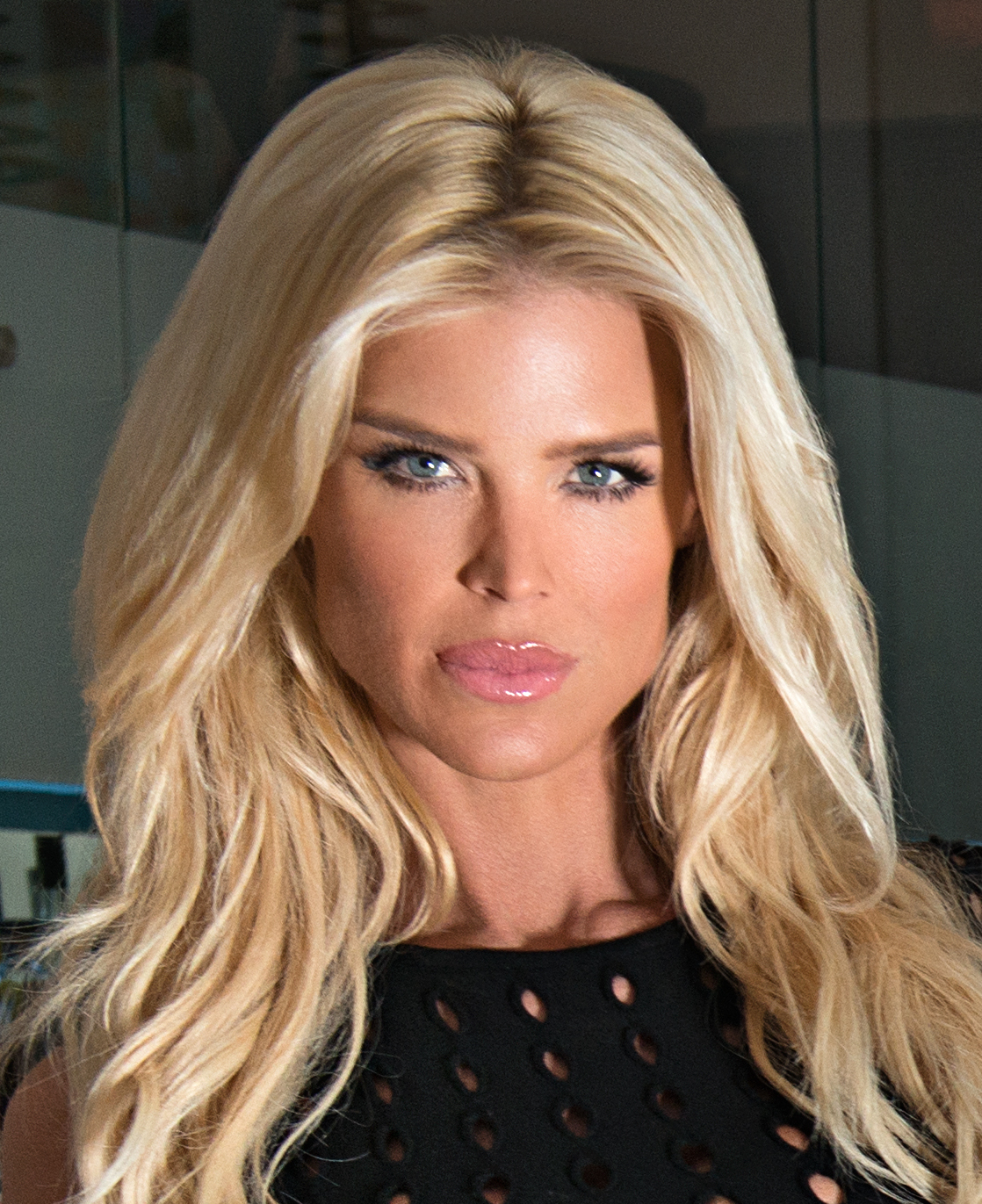
- Silvstedt in 2017

Playboy Playmate of the Year
- 1997
- Preceded by: Stacy Sanches
- Succeeded by: Karen McDougal

Personal details
- Born: Karen Victoria Silvstedt; September 19, 1974 (age 52) Skellefteå, Sweden
- Height: 5 ft 10.5 in (1.79 m)

Karen Victoria Silvstedt (born 19 September 1974 in Skellefteå, Västerbotten County), best known as Victoria Silvstedt, is a Swedish model, Playboy Playmate of the Year, actress and singer. She is also a radio and TV hostess, a published singer, and a former national-level skier in Sweden.

== See also ==
- List of people in Playboy 1990–1999

Victoria Fuller	Kona Carmack	Priscilla Taylor	Gillian Bonner	Shauna Sand	Karin Taylor
Angel Boris	Jessica Lee	Jennifer Allan	Nadine Chanz	Ulrika Ericsson	Victoria Silvstedt
