= Mystery Trackers =

Video game series

- Genres: Adventure, puzzle
- Developer: Elephant Games
- Publisher: Big Fish Games
- Platforms: Windows, Mac OS X, iOS
- First release: Mystery Trackers: The Void; October 14, 2010
- Latest release: Mystery Trackers: Reflections of the Past; November 15, 2024

Mystery Trackers is a casual game series developed by Elephant Games and distributed by Big Fish Games. The Mystery Trackers series are ‘Hidden Object Puzzle Adventure’ puzzles (HOPA), where to progress through a game, the player must find a certain number of items hidden somewhere on a painted scene.

== Game Series ==
=== Mystery Trackers: The Void ===
Mystery Trackers: The Void is the first game in the series. It was released on 14 October 2010. The player is in the role of a detective working for the Mystery Trackers Organization, which is a common thread among all games in the series. The detective is called to investigate a series of disappearances at the estate of a man named Malleus Void. The player then discovers a strange creature in the mansion's halls, which leads to them finding an entire mini ecosystem hidden in the house's backyard.

=== Mystery Trackers: Raincliff ===
Mystery Trackers: Raincliff is the second game in the series. It was released on 5 May 2011. The story is about four university students and their bus driver who have gone missing in the eponymous town of Raincliff. As the detective gradually discovers they have been taken hostage by the "phantoms of Raincliff," they go there to investigate - a trio of siblings cursed with invisibility. The siblings do not mean their captives any harm; they just want to erase their memories of Raincliff and then set them free. But the detective has to rescue the five hostages and get them out of Raincliff before they can be found by Rafael, the siblings' equally invisible father, who wants to kill them.

=== Mystery Trackers: Black Isle ===
Mystery Trackers: Black Isle is the third game in the series. It was released on 1 March 2012 and took place on an island that was completely evacuated after an earthquake had occurred there. A television news reporter and camera operator were trying to investigate the strange rumors circulated about the isle, and the Mystery Trackers had to save them from the mysterious masked man who seemed to have kidnapped them.

=== Mystery Trackers: The Four Aces ===
Mystery Trackers: The Four Aces is the fourth game in the series. It was announced on Elephant Games' Facebook page on May 23, 2012, along with a screenshot. It takes place in the city of Brightfield. Many strange creatures have been found roaming around the city, so the whole city was evacuated but one girl could not manage to evacuate in time, Kelly. The detective goes to Brightfield to try and get her out of there but a hairy beast grabs her. There also seems to be a lot of crimes that took place in the city Brightfield, all of the crimes had the four aces logo at the scene.

=== Mystery Trackers: Silent Hollow ===
Mystery Trackers: Silent Hollow is the fifth game in the series. A short trailer for it is shown in the extras for The Four Aces.

=== Mystery Trackers: Raincliff's Phantoms ===
Mystery Trackers: Raincliff's Phantoms is the sixth game in the series. It continues the Raincliff story-arc with the Detective returning to Raincliff to find a missing news reporter named Emilie White who was kidnapped by a new group of invisible people.

=== Mystery Trackers: Blackrow's Secret ===
Mystery Trackers: Blackrow's Secret is the seventh game in the series. The Collector's Edition was released on August 28, 2014 at Big Fish Games.

=== Mystery Trackers: Nightsville Horror ===
Mystery Trackers: Nightsville Horror is the eighth game in the series. This game was released on March 26, 2015 as a Collector's Edition on Big Fish Games.

=== Mystery Trackers: Winterpoint Tragedy ===
Mystery Trackers: Winterpoint Tragedy is the ninth game in the series. A Beta Survey Demo was released in May 2015. The CE was released in Mid August.

=== Mystery Trackers: Paxton Creek Avenger ===
Mystery Trackers: Paxton Creek Avenger is the tenth game in the series. The Collector's Edition was released on January 28, 2016.

=== Mystery Trackers: Train to Hellswich ===
Mystery Trackers: Train to Hellswich is the eleventh installment in the series.

=== Mystery Trackers: Queen of Hearts ===
Mystery Trackers: Queen of Hearts is the twelfth installment in the series, and was released in January 2017. It continues the Brightfield story arc.

=== Mystery Trackers: Memories of Shadowfield ===
The game was released on June 22, 2017, the thirteenth game of the series.

=== Mystery Trackers: Mist Over Blackhill ===
The game was released on April 28, 2018.

=== Mystery Trackers: Darkwater Bay ===
The fifteenth game was released on September 6, 2018. It is about a scientist that found an artifact from Atlantis and was kidnapped by criminals.

=== Mystery Trackers: The Fall of Iron Rock ===
The sixteenth game of the series. The Collector's Edition was released April 18, 2019.

=== Mystery Trackers: The Secret of Watch Hill ===
The seventeenth game of the series. It was released on December 28, 2019.

=== Mystery Trackers: Fatal Lesson ===
The eighteenth game of the series in 2020. First named Mystery Trackers: Tragedy in the Training Camp, the new title of the game is Fatal Lesson. The game was released on September 10, 2020.

=== Mystery Trackers: Forgotten Voices ===
The nineteenth game of the series. It was released on April 9, 2021.

=== Mystery Trackers: Reflections of the Past ===
The twentieth game of the series. It was released on November 15, 2024.

== Spin-off ==
In 2018, Big Fish Games and Elephant Games released a new series called Detectives United. It is a crossover that combines Mystery Trackers with two of Elephant Games' other popular mystery series, Haunted Hotel and Grim Tales.

1. Detectives United: Origins (9 August 2018)
2. Detectives United: The Darkest Shrine (2019)
3. Detectives United: Timeless Voyage (Feb 2020)
4. Detectives United: Phantoms of the Past (Jan 2021)
5. Detectives United: Deadly Debt (Jan 2022)
6. Detectives United: Beyond Time (2023)
