= Elephant Games =

Armenian game developer

- Industry: Video games Computer software
- Founded: 2003; 23 years ago
- Headquarters: Yerevan, Armenia
- Website: Elephant Games

Elephant Games is an international casual game developer company founded in 2003. The main expertise of the company is Hidden Object games. The company released more than 150 games, most of which were in partnership with the U.S. publisher Big Fish Games. The company's headquarters are located in Yerevan, Armenia, and the geography of the team is from India to Argentina.

== History ==
Initially the company was called White Elephant. The large white animal was associated with a big scale and uniqueness. Later, it was renamed Elephant Games. The company is owned by two people, Dmitry Kuklin and Andrey Pakhmutov.

The first game the company released was Crazy Worms. The projects that followed were Jungle Heart and RIP (Rest in Peace) Trilogy.

In 2006, the company released three installments of the top-down arcade shooter RIP. The game was first published by Meridian4, and then distributed as a trilogy on Steam.

In 2007, Elephant Games entered the European market with a fashion simulator game, Real Stories: Fashion Shop for Nintendo DS. Elephant Games was one of the first in its region to get the license from Nintendo. Later Nintendo approved and licensed the concept of the shooter WinD (Way in Dusk).

In 2009, the company expanded its DS and Wii portfolio with the action mini game Love Is... In Bloom based on the comic of the New Zealand artist Kim Grove.

Elephant Games also works on Hidden Object games. Lost in the City was launched in 2009. Other games include Mystery Trackers, Grim Tales and Detectives United.

The company has been cooperating with Big Fish, a major U.S. company, a global publisher and distributor of casual games. During the partnership, Elephant Games has won many international Big Fish Games Customer Favorites Awards.

In October 2012, the company released its first free-to-play game Found: A Hidden Object Adventure, which was available on both PC and iPad (currently closed).

The company's second free-to-play game Midnight Castle, was released in December 2013. The project has been around for over 10 years at this point.

Since 2009, Elephant Games has focused on the hidden object genre and launched more than 150 games with different themes, styles and settings.

== Game Series ==
- Lost in the City
  - Lost In The City (2009)
  - Lost In The City: Post Scriptum (2010)
- Mystery Trackers
  - Mystery Trackers: The Void (2010)
  - Mystery Trackers: Raincliff (2011)
  - Mystery Trackers: Black Isle (2012)
  - Mystery Trackers: The Four Aces (2012)
  - Mystery Trackers: Silent Hollow (2013)
  - Mystery Trackers: Raincliff’s Phantoms (2014)
  - Mystery Trackers: Blackrow’s Secret (2014)
  - Mystery Trackers: Nightsville Horror (2015)
  - Mystery Trackers: Winterpoint Tragedy (2015)
  - Mystery Trackers: Paxton Creek Avenger (2016)
  - Mystery Trackers: Train to Hellswich (2016)
  - Mystery Trackers: Queen of Hearts (2016)
  - Mystery Trackers: Memories of Shadowfield (2017)
  - Mystery Trackers: Mist Over Blackhill (2018)
  - Mystery Trackers: Darkwater Bay (2018)
  - Mystery Trackers: The Fall Of Iron Rock (2019)
  - Mystery Trackers: The Secret of Watch Hill (2019)
  - Mystery Trackers: Fatal Lesson (2020)
  - Mystery Trackers: Forgotten Voices (2021)
  - Mystery Trackers: Fall of Iron Rock (2022)
  - Mystery Trackers: Reflections of the Past (2024)
- Grim Tales
  - Grim Tales: The Bride (2011)
  - Grim Tales: The Legacy (2012)
  - Grim Tales: The Wishes (2012)
  - Grim Tales: The Stone Queen (2013)
  - Grim Tales: Bloody Mary (2013)
  - Grim Tales: The Vengeance (2014)
  - Grim Tales: Color of Fright (2014)
  - Grim Tales: The Final Suspect (2015)
  - Grim Tales: Threads of Destiny (2015)
  - Grim Tales: The Heir (2016)
  - Grim Tales: Crimson Hollow (2016)
  - Grim Tales: Graywitch (2017)
  - Grim Tales: The White Lady (2017)
  - Grim Tales: The Time Traveler (2018)
  - Grim Tales: The Hunger (2018)
  - Grim Tales: The Nomad (2019)
  - Grim Tales: Guest From The Future (2019)
  - Grim Tales: The Generous Gift (2020)
  - Grim Tales: Heritage (2020)
  - Grim Tales: Trace in Time (2021)
  - Grim Tales: Echo of the Past (2021)
  - Grim Tales: Horizon of Wishes (2022)
  - Grim Tales: Dual Disposition (2023)
  - Grim Tales: All Shades of Black (2023)
  - Grim Tales: Light in the Darkness (2024)
  - Grim Tales: Prisoners of the Past (2025)
- Hallowed Legends
  - Hallowed Legends: Samhain (2011)
  - Hallowed Legends: Templar (2011)
  - Hallowed Legends: Ship of Bones (2013)
- Chimeras
  - Chimeras: Tune of Revenge (2012)
  - Chimeras: The Signs of Prophecy (2015)
  - Chimeras: Cursed And Forgotten (2016)
  - Chimeras: Mortal Medicine (2016)
  - Chimeras: Mark of Death (2017)
  - Chimeras: Blinding Love (2017)
  - Chimeras: New Rebellion (2018)
  - Chimeras: Heavenfall Secrets (2018)
  - Chimeras: Wailing Woods (2019)
  - Chimeras: Price Of Greed (2019)
  - Chimeras: Cherished Serpent (2020)
  - Chimeras: Inhuman Nature (2020)
  - Chimeras: What Wishes May Come (2021)
- Christmas Stories
  - Christmas Stories: Nutcracker (2012)
  - Christmas Stories: A Christmas Carol (2013)
  - Christmas Stories: Hans Christian Andersen’s Tin Soldier (2014)
  - Christmas Stories: Puss in Boots (2015)
  - Christmas Stories: The Gift of the Magi (2016)
  - Christmas Stories: A Little Prince (2017)
  - Christmas Stories: Alice’s Adventures (2018)
  - Christmas Stories: Enchanted Express (2019)
  - Christmas Stories: The Christmas Tree Forest (2020)
  - Christmas Stories: Yulemen (2021)
  - Christmas Stories: Taxi of Miracles (2022)
  - Christmas Stories: The Legend of Toymakers (2024)
  - Christmas Stories: Clara and the Guiding Star (2024)
- Royal Detective
  - Royal Detective: The Lord of Statues (2012)
  - Royal Detective: Queen of Shadows (2014)
  - Royal Detective: Legend of the Golem (2016)
  - Royal Detective: Borrowed Life (2017)
  - Royal Detective: The Princess Returns (2018)
  - Royal Detective: The Last Charm (2019)
- Surface
  - Surface: Mystery of Another World (2012)
  - Surface: The Noise She Couldn’t Make (2012)
  - Surface: The Soaring City (2013)
  - Surface: The Pantheon (2013)
  - Surface: Reel Life (2014)
  - Surface: Game of Gods (2014)
  - Surface: Alone in the Mist (2015)
  - Surface: Return to Another World (2015)
  - Surface: Lost Tales (2016)
  - Surface: Virtual Detective (2016)
  - Surface: Strings of Fate (2017)
  - Surface: Project Dawn (2017)
- Death Pages
  - Death Pages: Ghost Library (2013)
- Haunted Hotel
  - Haunted Hotel: Haunted Hotel (2008)
  - Haunted Hotel: Believe the Lies (2009)
  - Haunted Hotel: Lonely Dream (2010)
  - Haunted Hotel: Charles Dexter Ward (2012)
  - Haunted Hotel: Eclipse (2013)
  - Haunted Hotel: Ancient Bane (2014)
  - Haunted Hotel: Death Sentence (2014)
  - Haunted Hotel: Eternity (2015)
  - Haunted Hotel: Phoenix (2015)
  - Haunted Hotel: The X (2015)
  - Haunted Hotel: The Axiom Butcher (2016)
  - Haunted Hotel: Silent Waters (2016)
  - Haunted Hotel: The Thirteenth (2016)
  - Haunted Hotel: Personal Nightmare (2017)
  - Haunted Hotel: The Evil Inside (2017)
  - Haunted Hotel: Lost Dreams (2018)
  - Haunted Hotel: Beyond the Page (2018)
  - Haunted Hotel: Room 18 (2019)
  - Haunted Hotel: Lost Time (2020)
  - Haunted Hotel: A Past Redeemed (2021)
- Mystery Case Files
  - Mystery Case Files: Fate’s Carnival (2013)
  - Mystery Case Files: Dire Grove, Sacred Grove (2014)
- Riddles of Fate
  - Riddles Of Fate: Wild Hunt (2013)
  - Riddles of Fate: Into Oblivion (2014)
  - Riddles of Fate: Memento Mori (2014)
- Midnight Calling
  - Midnight Calling: Anabel (2015)
  - Midnight Calling: Jeronimo (2016)
  - Midnight Calling: Valeria (2017)
  - Midnight Calling: Wise Dragon (2017)
  - Midnight Calling: Arabella (2018)
- Halloween Stories
  - Halloween Stories: Invitation (2017)
  - Halloween Stories: Black Book (2018)
  - Halloween Stories: Horror Movie (2019)
  - Halloween Stories: Defying Death (2020)
  - Halloween Stories: The Neglected Dead (2021)
  - Halloween Stories: Mark on the Bones (2022)
- Detectives United
  - Detectives United: Origins (2018)
  - Detectives United: The Darkest Shrine (2019)
  - Detectives United: Timeless Voyage (2020)
  - Detectives United: Phantoms of the Past (2021)
  - Detectives United: Deadly Debt (2022)
  - Detectives United: Beyond Time (2023)
- Paranormal Files
  - Paranormal Files: Fellow Traveler (2018)
  - Paranormal Files: The Tall Man (2018)
  - Paranormal Files: Enjoy The Shopping (2019)
  - Paranormal Files: The Hook Man Legend (2019)
  - Paranormal Files: Trials of Worth (2020)
  - Paranormal Files: The Trap of Truth (2020)
  - Paranormal Files: Ghost Chapter (2020)
  - Paranormal Files: Price of a Secret (2022)
  - Paranormal Files: Silent Willow (2023)
- Ms. Holmes
  - Ms. Holmes: Monster of Baskervilles (2019)
  - Ms. Holmes: Five Orange Pips (2020)
  - Ms. Holmes: The Adventure of the McKirk Ritual (2021)
  - Ms. Holmes: The Curse of the Dancing Men (2023)
- Strange Investigations
  - Strange Investigations: Becoming (2021)
  - Strange Investigations: Two For Solitaire (2022)
  - Strange Investigations: Secrets Can Be Deadly (2023)
- Crossroads
  - Crossroads: On a Just Path (2021)
  - Crossroads: Escape the Dark (2022)
  - Crossroads: What Was Lost (2023)
- Cursed Fables
  - Cursed Fables: White as Snow (2022)
  - Cursed Fables: Twisted Towers (2022)
  - Cursed Fables: A Voice to Die For (2023)
- It Happened Here
  - It Happened Here: Streaming Lives (2023)
  - It Happened Here: Beacon of Truth (2023)
  - It Happened Here: A Storm is Brewing (2024)
  - It Happened Here: If Walls Could Talk (2024)
- Knight Cats
  - Leaves on the Road (2023)
  - Waves on the Water (2023)
  - Whisper of the Universe (2024)
- Stand Alone Games
  - Avalon (2006)
  - Jungle Heart (2006)
  - Road Rush (2006)
  - RIP Trilogy (2007)
  - Bloom (2008)
  - Real Stories: Fashion Shop (2008)
  - Love Is... In Bloom (2009)
  - Wisegal (2009)
  - Ball Craft (2010)
  - Masquerade Mysteries: The Case of the Copycat Curator (2010)
  - Urban Legends: The Maze (2011)
  - Found: A Hidden Object Adventure (2012)
  - Detective Quest: The Crystal Slipper (2013)
  - Midnight Castle (2013)
  - Unfinished Tales: Illicit Love (2013)
  - Sir Match-a-Lot (2016)
  - Book Travelers: A Victorian Story (2022)
