= James Adams (entrepreneur) =

American author and entrepreneur

James Adams is an English American journalist, author, entrepreneur and expert on covert warfare. Adams is a senior advisor at Fathom.org, a nonprofit whose mission is to find and build governance solutions for A.I. that foster public trust. He's also a senior associate at the Center for Strategic and International Studies focused on national security and technology.

Adams was born in Newcastle, England, where he spent his childhood. In 1991, he immigrated to the United States, becoming a citizen in 1997.

Adams ran the intelligence operations for an innovative LA-based company and then founded the Ashland Institute for Strategic Studies, a virtual intelligence organization, and iDefense, a cyber intelligence agency. He also was CEO of United Press International. Adams is an expert on warfare and intelligence, and has written 20 best-selling fiction and non-fiction books on the subjects. They include The Next World War, published by Simon & Schuster, The Financing of Terror, The New Spies, and Sellout: Aldrich Ames and the Corruption of the CIA. In 2019, he wrote (with Richard Kletter) Artificial Intelligence - Confronting the Revolution, published by Endeavour. He has also written on intelligence for Foreign Affairs and The New York Times, among other publications. Recently, Adams has ghosted a number of biographies of Fortune 500 CEOs.

Adams has also been on the board of the NSA and as chairman of its technology oversight panel, as well as on special task forces for the White House on psychological operations and cyber warfare. In 2024, Adams was awarded a place on the Federal 100 list which honors achievements in cybersecurity and artificial intelligence, among other categories that support federal IT.

== Early career ==
From 1975 to 1991, Adams held various positions at the London newspaper The Sunday Times. His titles included defence correspondent, Washington Bureau Chief, and Managing Editor, overseeing the paper's transition from old-fashioned linotype printing to an electronic method under editor Andrew Neil.

In 1984, his first book, The Unnatural Alliance, was published by Quartet Books.

From 1985 to 1995, Adams wrote seven other books on warfare and intelligence, profiling changes in terrorism and espionage over the decade. Over those same years, Adams published three fictional thrillers with Michael Joseph Ltd. in London: The Final Terror, Taking the Tunnel, and Hard Target.

In 1996, he wrote the screenplay for the video game Spycraft: The Great Game.

In 1998, he published The Next World War: Computer are the Weapons and the Front Line is Everywhere with Simon & Schuster, the research of which influenced his leadership at iDefense.

== iDefense ==
Adams founded Infrastructure Defense, aka iDefense, in 1998. In a 2000 congressional oversight hearing on the ILOVEYOU virus and its impact on the U.S. financial services industry, Adams described his company: "iDefense provides intelligence-driven products, daily reports, consulting, and certification that allow clients to mitigate or avoid computer network, Internet and information asset attacks before they occur," he said.

In 2005, web security company Verisign bought iDefense for $40M.

== Appointments ==
From 1998 to 2002, Adams was on the Strategic Advisory Group for the Central Intelligence Agency. During that time, he also joined White House task forces on cyber security and psychological operations to combat Al-Qaeda.

In 1999, Adams joined the NSA Advisory Board, where he led the design and implementation of a new strategic plan for the 15,000-strong Signals Intelligence Directorate to meet the technology and data challenges of the 21st century.

In 2001, Adams became founding Chairman of the Technology Advisory Panel at the NSA (which became the NSA's Emerging Technologies Panel NSAAB) which was congressionally mandated to oversee all of the NSA's technology programs.

From 2000 to 2007, Adams was involved in a number of covert programs for the U.S. intelligence community involving cyber warfare, psychological operations, terrorism, and proliferation.

From 2022 to 2026, Adams served as a senior advisor at the Johns Hopkins Applied Physics Laboratory, where he focused on national-security-related artificial intelligence.

== Audiobooks ==
Adams first became involved in the audiobook world as a narrator, when he read titles ranging from Bill Clinton: Mastering the Presidency to Once More, My Darling Rogue.

He founded BeeAudio in 2010, simplifying audiobook production for the digital age using cloud-based solutions and a global network of more than 600 narrators, proofers, and editors. BeeAudio is the largest independent producer of audiobooks in the world and was taken over by London-based Worldwide Audio Ltd. in 2015. The company was sold to Acclaim Audio in 2021.
