= World Basketball Manager =

- WBM series logo as of WBM 2.
- Genre(s): Sport
- Developer(s): Icehole Games
- Publisher(s): WW: Icehole Games (Digital), Strategy First (Steam); GR/CY: MLS; DE/AT/CH: BHV; PL/SK/CZ: IQ Publishing
- Creator(s): Thanasis Triantafillou; Dimitris Retzikas
- Platform(s): Windows, Classic Mac OS
- First release: Basketball Manager; 1998
- Latest release: World Basketball Manager X 23 May 2019; 5 years ago
- Spin-offs: World Basketball Manager Tycoon

World Basketball Manager (WBM) is a series of basketball management simulation video games, originally developed and published by Greek studio Icehole Games. The game began in 1998, known as Basketball Manager. In 2004, the series was renamed World Basketball Manager. The latest version, titled World Basketball Manager X was released on May 23, 2019.

== Main series ==
=== Basketball Manager ===
==== Basketball Manager (1998) ====
The original Basketball Manager was released in 1998, created by an internal development team at Volax Interactive calling themselves "icehole". The game was designed by 2 people, who have since cited football management simulation video games, such as Championship Manager, Player Manager and Premier Manager as their main influence. Basketball Manager featured only the Greek League and 2 European tournaments, and was released for the Greek market.

==== Basketball Manager 2000 ====
A second, improved and expanded version of Basketball Manager was released in 2000. This version included 6 European basketball leagues (by adding the French, German, Italian, Spanish and Israeli leagues to the existing Greek one) as well as every international European tournament held at that time, while also featuring new graphics.

=== World Basketball Manager ===
==== World Basketball Manager (2004) ====
With the success of the latest Basketball Manager game, the development team behind the BM project at Volax left the company and founded Metal Fin, but insisted on keeping "icehole" as the collective name of the team behind the next game's development. After securing funding, which enabled developers to work full-time on the next title, World Basketball Manager was released in 2004. The game featured 65 international basketball tournaments and a total of 94 countries, making it the only basketball management game at the time to include basketball teams outside of the NBA. WBM featured gameplay inspired by football management simulation video games, such as Championship Manager, and became well known for its realistic match simulation and challenging AI, which was based on a combination of a genetic algorithm and deterministic logic.

==== World Basketball Manager 2005 ====
The 2005 version of WBM was released in 2005 in China and Germany, each country receiving its own localized version, while existing WBM players could download the game as a free upgrade. The game was practically a re-release of the 2004 version, featuring the same graphics and gameplay mechanics but with updated team rosters corresponding to the 2004/05 season.

==== World Basketball Manager 2007 ====
World Basketball Manager 2007 was the third entry in the WBM series. The game received an international release on 22 February 2007, with BHV handling distribution in Germany, Austria and Switzerland, while the Greek version was published by MLS in both Greece and Cyprus.

The game featured an expanded database over its predecessors, with 64 national and international tournaments, 655 teams, 10.000 basketball players and 1.000 managers, although no improvements were made to the game's graphics. The game further featured a new training system with 106 different training routines, improved AI, faster game progression algorithms, more realistic free agent pricing, improved player creation and career progress and a simulation of the NBA draft taking place at the beginning of every season. Players could create their own manager profile and manage various club departments (including medical, training facilities and youth academy), transfers, contracts, training and actual coaching during games. A feedback system was implemented, including feedback from the press, fans, players and administration, allowing players to receive job offers from more prestigious basketball clubs and even national basketball teams.

==== World Basketball Manager 2008 ====
World Basketball Manager 2008 was the fourth entry in the WBM series. Icehole added new features and improvements to the WBM formula, most notably pre-season training camp selection, which influences the overall development of players for the entire season; and mid-season sponsorship contracts. Other improvements include a revamped training system, allowing players to improve the team's zone defending or cohesion through training; the addition of "Form" in the players' list of attributes; an option for database size affecting game speed and realism by loading one of two available database choices; opponent scouting reports; and the ability to start a new career as a national team manager.

The game introduced new leagues from Australia, Brazil, France, Lithuania, Poland, Portugal and Turkey, and included support for 8 languages, including English, French, Italian, German, Greek, Lithuanian, Portuguese and Spanish.

==== World Basketball Manager 2009 ====
World Basketball Manager 2009 was the fifth game in the WBM series. This version added 22 new tournaments, raising the total number to 89, with 852 teams, 10.000 basketball players and 1.000 managers. New features and improvements included an improved match algorithm and revamped interface, overall improved control of the player's club financial situation with the ability to issue demands to club Administration, a number of bonuses for managerial achievements, such as team-building and cohesive make-up of club rosters, improved transfer algorithms and the ability to cancel time-outs during games. Furthermore, Icehole included two more languages (Serbian and Turkish), raising the total number to 10, while also reaching an agreement with IQ Publishing to handle distribution of the game in Poland, Slovakia and the Czech Republic.

On 9 September 2009, Icehole announced a free mini-game based on the EuroBasket 2009 tournament in Poland, featuring all 16 participating teams (as well as all European national teams already featured WBM 2009). The game featured two game modes (a Tournament mode for teams already qualified for the tournament, and a Qualification mode for all other European teams) and a new data editor for players to make changes to the teams' rosters.

==== World Basketball Manager 2010 ====
World Basketball Manager 2010 was released as a free upgrade of the series' previous installment. Adding no new features or mechanics, the 2010 version would update all tournament formats to their 2009/10 status, expanding the game database even further to include over 12.500 players, 1.400 managers and 975 teams. It was also the first in the series to be made available on Steam.

This would become the standard format for WBM games for the next 5 years (with season 2015 being the last update the game received), until the release of World Basketball Manager 2. Another free mini-game, this time based on the 2014 FIBA Basketball World Cup, with a similar premise to the EuroBasket 2009 edition, was released in September 2014, featuring all 24 participating teams, tournament venues, drawn Groups and national team rosters.

=== World Basketball Manager 2 ===
On February 2, 2017, Icehole announced the release World Basketball Manager 2, a new entry in the WBM series and the first game of the franchise to be available on Mac. Development on the game had started in 2013, with the game's release being planned for the summer of 2014, but after an unsuccessful Indiegogo campaign to raise 25,000€, the game was delayed until its 2017 release date.

WBM2 marked the departure of the series from its previous text-based visual presentation, introducing a new visual 2D match engine, an improved and more legible user interface as well as a number of improvements in the technological area and AI. The game's database included over 13.500 players, 1.100 basketball teams and more than 100 Club and National Team tournaments, while the game featured support for 12 languages upon its release.

=== World Basketball Manager X ===
World Basketball Manager X is the latest game in the WBM series, released on May 23, 2019 for Microsoft Windows, with a MacOS version following in 2020. WBMX is based on the WBM2 engine, introducing several improvements and updates over its predecessor.

== Other games ==
=== Spin-offs ===
==== World Basketball Manager Tycoon ====
On June 4, 2013 Icehole Games announced the release of the series' first (and to this day, only) spin-off title, World Basketball Manager Tycoon. The game is a departure from the strict management simulation format established by the other WBM games, instead opting for a mixture between the former and a tycoon game experience. In July 2014, Icehole announced that the game would receive a physical release in Poland, distributed by IQ Publishing.

WBM Tycoon features over 100 national and international competitions, 1000+ clubs (including national teams), 12.500+ basketball players and over 1200 managers, sharing the same database and match AI with the regular WBM game series. Maintaining much of the managerial aspects found in the previous games, WBM Tycoon players are further tasked with successfully building and maintaining a basketball franchise through business ownership as an entrepreneur. This includes managing the club's finances, facilities and team overall winning form.

== Licensing ==
Due to the absence of any licensing, each WBM release includes "unofficial" league, club, player and manager names, with clubs either using obvious city names (such as Barcelona being called "Barcelonia" or "Regal Barca"), nicknames (such as AEK Athens being called "Enosi"), or misspelled names (such as the Miami Heat being called "Muami Hiat"). However, a community-maintained database has been created by fans of the game, called the Real Names & Images Project, which includes real team logos, player and manager photos, more than 9600 real names of basketball players, 650 actual team names and 1000 actual manager names from 194 countries. In order for the database to be updated every season, the users have created a network of researchers who update and make the data available for download through an unofficial, but condoned by Icehole Real Names Patch.

== See also ==
- Sports management games
