= Dark Nights with Poe and Munro =

- Developer: D'Avekki Studios
- Publisher: D'Avekki Studios
- Engine: Unity
- Platforms: macOS; Windows; Linux; PlayStation 4; Xbox One; Nintendo Switch; iOS
- Release: macOS, Windows; May 19, 2020; Linux; March 31, 2021; PlayStation 4, Xbox One; May 4, 2021; Nintendo Switch; July 15, 2021 iOS; October 27, 2021
- Genre: Adventure
- Mode: Single-player

Dark Nights with Poe and Munro is an adventure game developed by D'Avekki Studios. Players control two radio hosts as they become embroiled in various short adventures involving the supernatural. The game uses full-motion video.

== Gameplay ==
John "Poe" Pope and Ellis Munro are radio hosts who cover supernatural topics. The characters previously appeared in D'Avekki Studios' games as minor characters. In the series chronology, this game takes place before The Shapeshifting Detective. Players control Poe and Munro as they become involved in six supernatural adventures, each of which is self-contained. At points where the players can make choices, icons are displayed on the screen. Players must choose an icon that represents their desired action before time runs out. During more intense situations, such as a facing someone wielding a knife, the timers are shorter. After each adventure, the game recounts the player's choices and tells them how popular each choice was among other gamers.

== Development ==
Dark Nights with Poe and Munro was initially meant to be a small game made between D'Avekki Studios' major projects, but the developers said it eventually became their largest project as of 2021. It was released for PCs on May 19, 2020; for Xbox One and PlayStation 4 on May 4, 2021; for Nintendo Switch on July 15, 2021; and for iOS on October 27, 2021.

== Reception ==
On Metacritic, Dark Nights with Poe and Munro received mixed reviews. Fellow review aggregator OpenCritic assessed that the game received fair approval, being recommended by 73% of critics. Adventure Gamers wrote, "A mix of the supernatural and saucy, Dark Nights with Poe & Munro excites with witty exchanges and Lynchian tales that come undone by unclear choice and pacing." IGN published two reviews. IGN France praised the game's replayability and atmosphere, and IGN Greece praised the branching choices and called the leads likeable. Digitally Downloaded's reviewer enjoyed the noir atmosphere, acting, and gameplay, which was described as "new yet familiar". The Danish version of Gamereactor said that the game is uneven but enjoyable.
