= Darkfall =

2009 online role-playing game

Darkfall Online
- Developer: Aventurine SA
- Publisher: Audiovisual Enterprises SA
- Designers: Kjetil Helland; Claus Grovdal
- Platform: Windows
- Release: EU: 25 February 2009 to 15 November 2012; NA: 13 July 2009 to 15 November 2012
- Genre: MMOFPS
- Mode: Open PvP Multiplayer

Darkfall: Rise of Agon
- Developer: Big Picture Games Ltd.
- Release: 5 May 2017

Darkfall: New Dawn
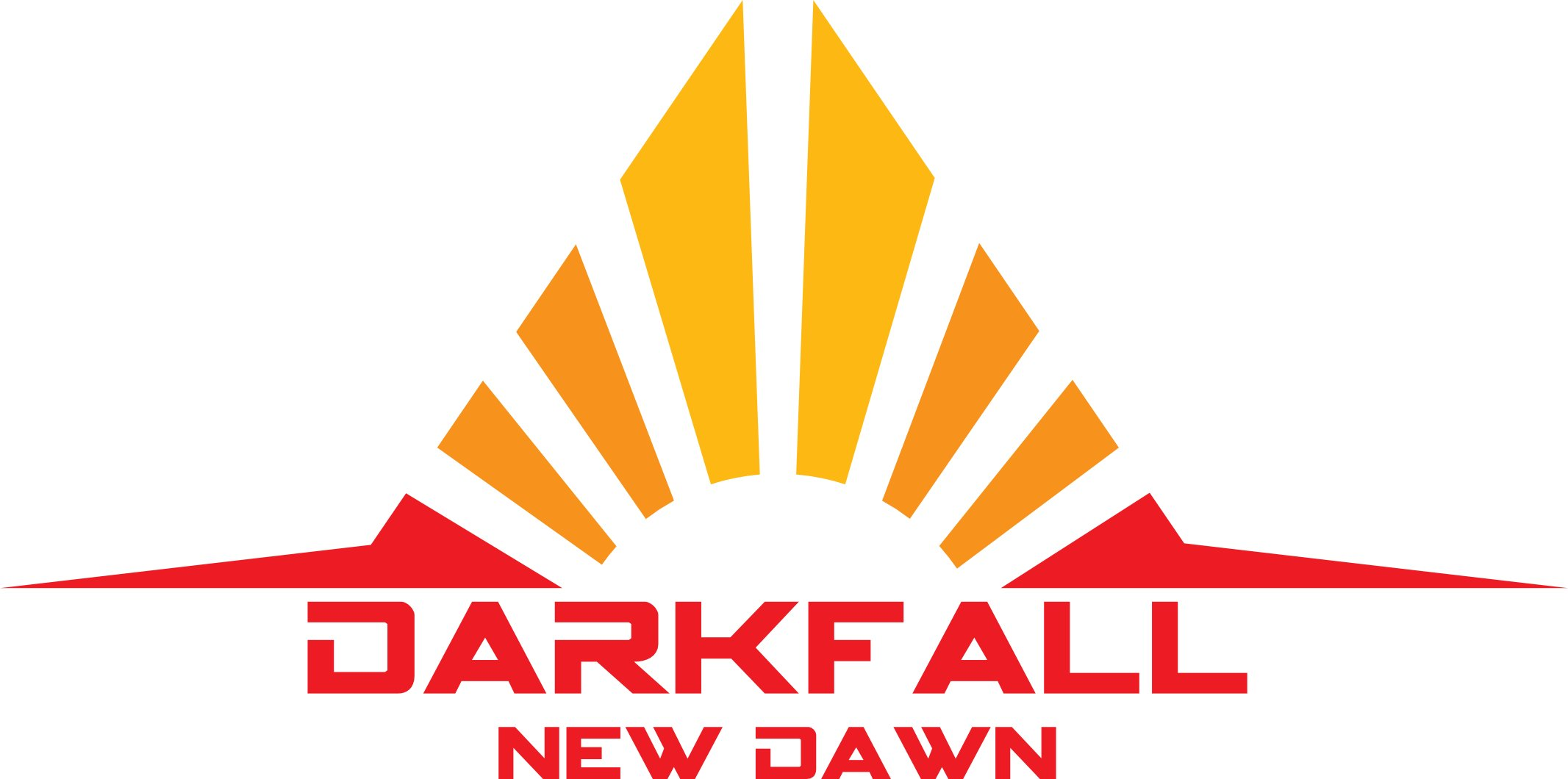
- Developer: Ub3rgames
- Release: 26 January 2018

Darkfall was a massively multiplayer online role-playing game (MMORPG) developed by Aventurine SA that combined real-time action and strategy in a fantasy setting. The game featured unrestricted PvP, full looting, a large, dynamic game world, and a player-skill dependent combat system free of the class and level systems that typify most MMORPGs. Darkfall had a 3D world environment and contained mild violence. The official Darkfall servers were closed on 15 November 2012.

Aventurine has since sold the license of Darkfall Online to two independent companies, Ub3rgames and Big Picture Games.

== Development history (2001 to 2012) ==
On 29 August 2001, Razorwax announced the development of Darkfall and launched its official website. The Razorwax development team was based in Oslo, Norway, and initially consisted of five members: Claus Grovdal (Lead Design and Producer), Ricki Sickenger (Lead Tools and Game Logic Programmer), Henning Ludvigsen (Art Director), Kjetil Helland (Lead 3D/Client Programmer), and Erik Sperling Johansen (Lead Server Programmer). Approximately 14 months later, in October 2002, the Razorwax team was integrated into Aventurine SA, a newly formed company based in Athens, Greece, ostensibly created for the continued development and subsequent commercialisation of Darkfall. When the Razorwax team and the Aventurine team had their first meeting in Athens, a member of one of the teams joked that Razorwax should relocate from Norway to Greece due to the lower taxes and cost of living in Greece. Eventually, the two teams realised that this idea actually made very good business sense, and by December 2002, the relocation of Razorwax, now Aventurine, was finalised.

In September 2005, a signup page for a closed clan beta was made available on the web; this beta never happened, however a 1.5 minute Darkfall gameplay video was released in February 2006 as recompense to the community. A later statement from associate producer Tasos Flambouras explained that a decision had been made internally to devote additional money and resources into expanding the scope of the game.

Darkfall's first major public revelation was at the game convention E3 in 2006, and while Aventurine did not have a publicly playable version at the time, various industry journalists were shown a standalone demonstration version of the game. From June 2006 onwards, just after E3, the Darkfall development team began releasing bi-weekly developer journals and community question/answer articles, published on the game forum site Warcry.

An announcement on 11 July 2006 stated that preparations were being made to begin beta, although Aventurine stated it did not have a publisher for Darkfall at the time, and that they were considering the possibility of self-publishing the game. Six months later, on 17 January 2007, Aventurine announced they were in active discussions with prospective partners, distributors, publishers, and technology providers, and that a fully functional and stable beta build was running on remote servers.

On 30 January 2007, Aventurine released their second official gameplay video, consisting of about one minute of in-game footage demonstrating real-time melee combat, mounts (including mounted combat), spell-casting and naval combat. In May 2007, Aventurine gave an update on their progress towards beta, announcing that their internal target date for beta was in Summer 2007. A later update, on 2 August 2007, stated that beta would not start until negotiations with possible publishers were complete.

On 22 February 2008, Aventurine released a "location test video" depicting various NPC and player-crafted city locations in the game. Later, in April 2008, it was announced that Darkfall was feature-complete, and in May, that "... our launch date will be inside 2008, with the public beta preceding it by a few weeks. This is official and internally we're a lot more specific, but pending an announcement, we cannot say more at this time".

In June 2008, Aventurine confirmed they had signed with Greek company AudioVisual Enterprises to distribute Darkfall in Europe, and this was confirmed by AudioVisual in a stock market announcement made to the Greek Stock Exchange.

On 29 August 2008, Darkfall's official beta was announced as the final scene of a 17-minute gameplay video, which demonstrated numerous aspects of the game, such as small and large group PVP, including small and large group mounted combat, ship sailing and naval combat, magic and archery, and vehicular combat, creative use of in-game physics and magic, crafting, banking, 3 different PVE encounters demonstrating mob AI, and city building and sieging. This was soon followed by a "limited public hardware test" of Darkfall as the first phase of public beta, which was then followed by a staged gameplay-oriented public beta.

On 16 October 2008, Darkfall was publicly presented at Athens Digital Week. This event was unofficially reported by a member of the Darkfall forum moderators during this event, including a 30-minute video of Darkfall played live on stage.

On 5 December 2008, Tasos Flambouras announced that Darkfall would be released for the European market on 22 January 2009, with an American release to follow. This launch date was later revised to 25 February 2009. The NDA for beta players was lifted on 18 February 2009.

On 24 June 2009, Tasos announced that Darkfall will launch in North America on 7 July 2009, alongside Darkfall's first free expansion to the game.

Darkfall launched successfully in North America on 13 July 2009.

Darkfall's first free expansion launched in July 2009 featuring massive monster re-balancing, player housing, Darkfall's village system, the Nexus system, a character specialization system, the weather system, special items, new weapons and much more.

Darkfall's second free expansion launched in early December 2009. The EU-1 server went down late on Thursday 3 December and the North American Server went down shortly after for patching. The update was the largest the game has seen to date and added many desired dynamics to the game not seen in the game's first 9 months. Shortly before both servers went live extensive patch notes were released for the 2nd expansion titled "Conquer the Seas".

On 11 June 2010, Darkfall developers released patch outlines which outlined critical fixes to the game. These fixes are some of the most important changes made to Darkfall to date.

On 10 February 2011, Darkfall developers released yet another patch which addressed several issues that had major effects on gameplay. Three Notable changes were clan bank permissions, War Status Timeouts (7 days from declaration), and bindstone mechanics designating where you will spawn in the event changes in political affiliation and alignment.

On 25 April 2011, Aventurine changed hosting locations to Chicago to improve server stability.

On 2 July 2012, Aventurine released the Ultimate Promotion patch. It increased skill gains and loot while removing the purchase fee entirely and reducing monthly subscription cost to $9.95, down from $15. This promotion ran from release until the launch of Darkfall 2.0.

On 18 September 2012, Aventurine announced Darkfall Unholy Wars. The game was due to launch in 20 November. On 14 November 2012, Aventurine announced that due to a combination of external factors, last minute issues, and final testing feedback, the company was forced to push back the release date to 12 December 2012. Darkfall Unholy Wars is set again in the fantasy world of Agon, countless centuries after the events that took place in the original Darkfall Online. The company released a set of feature, game play and developer diary videos to support the launch on their official YouTube channel.

== Development history (2012 to present) ==
Big Picture Games Ltd.
- Industry: Video games, MMORPG
- Founded: 26 August 2015
- Website: https://www.darkfallriseofagon.com/about/

Ub3rgames
- Industry: Video games, MMORPG
- Founded: 31 August 2015
- Website: http://darkfallnewdawn.com/about-us/

On 28 April 2015, Axilmar, a gui developer working on the actual Unholy Wars, posted a petition on Reddit to taste the interest in a classic Darkfall server due to the demand of the community. The petition raised about 1789 signatures. About a month later he presented the result to the Aventurine CEO.

On 15 June 2015, after 3 days of delay the CEO of Aventurine Zad Mehdawi posted a message where he explained that Darkfall is not feasible due to the large investment in the infrastructure and development support needed to run the game, and so they ditched a Darkfall revival but were continuing to work and improve the actual game Unholy Wars. However the company is open to serious proposals for licensing and support the original Darkfall game.

On 16 June 2015, Claus Grovdal, the original creator of Darkfall, former Razorwax CEO, wrote on Twitter that he was disappointed that Aventurine is not considering bringing back Darkfall Online.

On 18 November 2015, the community manager Ici Wave in a post on the official forum, wrote that Aventurine was under negotiations with 2 interested parties for the license of Darkfall Online.

On 3 February 2016, Ub3rgames confirmed the acquisition of Darkfall Online license and updated their own website.

On 1 March 2016, Big Picture Games also confirmed the acquisition of the Darkfall Online license.

On 8 March 2016, Ub3rgames along with their weekly update, released the first in-game footage of Darkfall: New Dawn.

On 19 March 2016, Big Picture Games released the first in-game footage of Darkfall: Rise of Agon.

On 8 April 2016, Big Picture Games released the closed alpha for Darkfall: Rise of Agon with NDA in place and first 500 invites along with a new alpha trailer. They also opened the store with 3 different founder packs.

On 14 June 2016, Ub3rgames in their weekly update announced the launch date of Darkfall: New Dawn stress test for 28 June 2016 at 2:00 PM Paris time.

On 3 August 2016, Big Picture Games announce the launch of the closed beta.

On 16 August 2016, Darkfall: New Dawn switch from free stress test to InDev beta, only people who bought the game can play it.

On 5 May 2017, Darkfall: Rise of Agon launched. Can be played at the moment, planned release in Steam https://store.steampowered.com/news/app/2077110/view/540002078396777961

On 26 January 2018, Darkfall: New Dawn launches.

== Gameplay ==
=== Skills ===
Darkfall departs from the conventional MMORPG paradigm of character levels as the main form of character progression, favouring instead a broad skill-based system, similar to that found in games such as Ultima Online, Eve Online, Wurm Online and Asheron's Call. Skills and skill proficiency determine a wide range of a character's capability in the game, including weapons and weapon skills, a few special attacks, spells, and archery, all aspects of player crafting, as well as more basic facets of gameplay, such as the ability to swim, craft various types of items, and to ride and control mounts.

Skills may be learned from NPC trainers in the game, however certain skills will require other skills as prerequisites. Without exception however, skills are improved (raised in power) through actual usage in game.

=== Playable races ===
There are six playable races in Darkfall, divided into 3 factions. Unlike other MMORPGs, racial choice does not heavily influence character choices or progression options. Each race begins play in their own homeland, and have their own unique storylines, histories, and racial alliances/enemies. It is possible to form mixed-race clans of opposing factions, however racial alignment adjustments (see 'Alignment') are always in effect.

While certain races have friendships and hatreds with other races in Darkfall, these are not strictly enforced upon the players, and it is possible for allied clans to declare war upon both their own race and their racial allies. Declaring war against a clan will prevent players of the declaring clan from sustaining alignment penalties (as well as gains) associated with attacking and killing players of the opposing clan, regardless of race.

The races, organised by faction, are:

- Alfar (dark elves)
- Orks, Mahirim (wolf men)
- Humans, Mirdain (forest elves), Dwarves

=== Attributes ===
- Strength: Increases damage dealt with melee weapons, and moderately affects max health.
- Vitality: Grants a bonus to max health and moderate bonus to stamina. A high vitality may slightly reduce the effects of poison and bleeding.
- Dexterity: Increases archery damage and may reduce damage taken from area effects.
- Quickness: Slightly increases melee and archer speed and may reduce damage taken from such attacks. Also grants a moderate bonus to max stamina.
- Intelligence: Increases the power of spells and greatly affects max mana. It also improves resistance against mental attacks.
- Wisdom: Grants a bonus to all crafting and harvesting skills. Also moderately affects max mana, and grants a slight resist bonus against curses.

As with other MMORPGs, player characters have a set of semi-static attributes, which determine their in-game physical and mental prowess. These attributes are: strength, vitality, dexterity, wisdom, intelligence, and quickness These attributes improve over time in response to player activity. For example, repeated use of a melee weapon will result in a gradual improvement in that player's strength statistic, which in turn will allow him to deal greater melee damage. There are also three dynamic attributes: hit points, mana, and stamina, which determine a player's overall vitality and capacity for physical activity and/or magic, which fluctuate in response to performing actions and receiving damage.

Likewise, the casting of magical spells requires and expends mana points, and the execution of various physical activities, such as sprinting, the swinging of weapons, and casting of spells expend stamina. All three of these statistics are regained over time at varying rates, and may be rapidly regained through the use of healing and other restorative spells, potions and items.

=== PvP ===
Darkfall has been designed from the outset as a full-loot PVP game, meaning on death players are able to fully loot other players of their gear and gold on their person. The ability to fully loot other players has been factored into the game as an important facet of the risk versus reward nature of the game.

The ability to fully loot other players is a significant departure from other, contemporary MMORPGs, such as World of Warcraft and EverQuest II, in which the quest for better gear is the primary driving force of player character improvement once maximum level has been attained. In Darkfall, character skills are the primary driver of character improvement, and gear also plays a large role in determining a player character's overall power.

Friendly fire and collision detection are always in effect in Darkfall. Combined with a real-time combat system, Darkfall's combat is anticipated to provide a more realistic combat experience than other fantasy MMORPGs. The developers have opined that historically successful battle formations and tactics will be widely adopted and adapted for use in Darkfall.

=== City building and conquest ===
A screenshot of a city siege

The goal of Darkfall is its support for large-scale territorial conflict between player clans. To this end, empire building through the conquering of pre-made cities is a major part of the game. To promote such conflict, there is a finite number of pre-made cities (97 locations - 44 cities, 53 Hamlets) within the world. The potential pre-made city and hamlet sites are marked in-game by structures known as clanstones.

These pre-made city sites are spread across the entirety of the world, and vary greatly in location, surrounding terrain, access to nearby resource nodes, and consequently, their ability to be defended by the owning clan.

Player clans have full diplomatic control over their relationship with other player clans, and can declare war on other clans unilaterally. Clans that are at war with each other may kill each other freely without alignment penalties. Player-owned cities can be freely attacked and then sieged. Sieges last for 4 hours. In the first two hours the defenders may launch an attack on the enemy's shard holder or city. If the defenders are victorious, the siege ends. The attackers may attempt to capture the defender's city after two hours have passed. They only have two hours to destroy the clanstone. To this end, Darkfall contains a variety of different siege weapons such as cannons and siege hammers, all of which are player-crafted. There is a limit on the rate of destruction of a captured city of 1 building per day, however any number of buildings may be disabled at any time by bringing their structural integrity to zero.

Player housing was later added. Houses were stationed across the world and the owners could build various things inside their home or as an add-on to it once they locate a rare item called a "house deed" and find an empty spot for their home. Players would then pay taxes on their home or else they could lose it to another player who is willing to pay the tax. Clans are able to fight over these villages for control of the tax revenue which adds additional PvP elements.

In the patch "Conquer the Seas", Darkfall received two large fortresses at the North and South ends of Agon. These fortresses are only attack-able from a player built ship. If a clan controls the sea tower they get a server wide broadcast of their accomplishment, free recruitment postings in NPC towns, and additional revenue. Tons of fixes to the conquest system were also introduced in 2009 and bugged city structures were fixed.

=== Alignment ===
Darkfall features a player character alignment system that ranges from good to evil based upon the actions of players. Characters start the game with a good alignment, which decreases on performing "evil" actions such as attacking racial allies without provocation, or killing racial allies. The consequences of evil actions include being temporarily attackable by guard towers in NPC controlled cities, and other players being able to attack these "grey" players without repercussion. A succession of evil actions results in negative alignment, and a permanent "kill on sight" ("red") status. Alignment can be regained only by killing racial enemies and/or by killing other evil players.

In the 31 March 2011 patch, alignment can only be regained by praying at a church in a chaos city.

=== Stealth ===
In Darkfall, stealth is accomplished by playing stealthily, employing real-world stealth techniques such as moving in darkness/shadow, employing camouflage, walking silently, and using world objects as cover; that is, stealth is not automatic, and not restricted to any particular class or subset of players. Since Darkfall is a classless MMORPG, any player is able to practise stealth-enhancing skills such as "crouch-walking" and to follow a stealthy play style.

This feature of stealth also comes with semi-realistic limitations - metallic armour reflects light. Stealth in Darkfall is also made possible through the deliberate lack of showing players on the minimap and use of first-person perspective for ranged combat and general movement.

== The Darkfall world ==
=== Geography ===
Darkfall claims to feature one of the largest online worlds of any MMORPG created to date. The Darkfall world consists of a large, central continent named Agon, on which all six racial capitals are found, surrounded by four smaller continents to the north-east, north-west, south-east and south-west. In addition, there are numerous small islands and archipelagos. It was estimated by one of the developers before release that it would take roughly eight hours for a human to run from one end to the other. In reality, the time to cross the main continent is closer to 4 hours, stretching the time to cross the map on a diagonal up to around six. (For comparison, Blizzard's World of Warcraft continent of Eastern Kingdoms is three hours from north to south.)

The world includes a wide range of diverse terrain types, including forest, plain, desert, ice, jungle/tropical, swamp, and wasteland areas. Every part of the Darkfall world has been handmade by the developers and not computer generated. Darkfall developers have stated that any/all terrain can be accessed and traversed by characters possessing the appropriate skills, e.g. mountains may be climbed by those who possess the ability to climb; islands may be reached by swimming.

=== Monster spawns and AI ===
Darkfall has a relatively small number of mob spawns relative to land mass compared to contemporary MMORPGs, in an attempt to reflect a more "realistic" style. Mobs also display generally higher artificial intelligence than in other games, and will frequently call for help, strategically retreat, dodge, and switch between melee and ranged attacks. Consequently, mobs are generally more difficult than in other MMOGs, to the extent that widescale mob rebalancing was a specific focus for the recent Darkfall expansion. The December patch of Darkfall further improved the AI of the mobs, making them even more difficult to take down.

=== Wild creatures ===
In order for the world to feel more alive and add new elements to the gameplay, the most recent patch of Darkfall included non-aggressive wild animals (such as deer) that players can hunt. They provide a number of resources.

=== Dungeons ===
Darkfall features several dungeons and underground areas. Both the Alfar and Dwarven racial capital cities are located predominantly underground. The dungeons in the world of Agon are not traditionally "instanced" like in other games. An instance is a separate game universe that a group of people are taken to when entering a dungeon so they can fight through the dungeon alone. In Darkfall the dungeons are available for everyone, and are not instanced—so-called open world dungeons as were the norm in first-generation MMORPGs such as EverQuest. The most notable effect of this is that players are fighting with other groups of people that are in the same dungeon in the non-instanced world. This is a result of the fact that the entire game world is seamless; everyone on a given server is sharing the same game session, from towns to dungeons.

== Launch ==
The game went live at 9 p.m. Central European Time (UTC+1) on 26 February 2009, twelve hours after the announced launch time. The launch saw a number of setbacks due to unexpected high demand; players stumbled upon a critical bug which the developers took the game down to fix, and Aventurine's website was unable to handle the overwhelming amount of traffic to the online store and forums, causing those features to become generally unavailable to customers for several hours. It was also reported by Aventurine that there were problems with the pre-order system. As a result of these problems, customers were awarded with four days of free game time.

The game launched on multiple online outlets such as Impulse on 1 July 2010.

== Reception ==
Game Observer gave Darkfall an overall score of 83/100.

Meristation gave Darkfall an overall score of 7/10.

Eurogamer game reviewer Ed Zitron awarded the game a rating of 2 out of 10. However, this review was not received well as it contained several basic gameplay description errors, and Darkfall lead developer Tasos Flambouras claims that game server logs show that the Eurogamer reviewer played the game for under three hours, a claim denied by the writer. Eurogamer's subsequent offer to compromise by commissioning a second opinion review (by noted games critic Kieron Gillen) was declined by Flambouras, but was carried out anyway, being awarded 4/10.
