= Robbie Swifthand and the Orb of Mysteries =

2017 platform game

- Steam storefront header
- Developer: Pixel Reign
- Publishers: Pixel Reign (PC); East2west Games (PlayStation 4); Kiss Publishing (Nintendo Switch)
- Designers: Nick Larin; Angelos Gkamiliaris
- Programmer: Nick Larin
- Composer: Vicky Fysika
- Engine: Unity
- Platforms: Microsoft Windows; OS X; PlayStation 4; Nintendo Switch
- Release: December 5, 2017: Microsoft Windows, OS X; December 5, 2017; PlayStation 4; July 23, 2019; Nintendo Switch; August 1, 2019
- Genre: Platform
- Mode: Single-player

Robbie Swifthand and the Orb of Mysteries is a 2017 2D action puzzle-platform video game developed by Greek studio Pixel Reign. It was self-published as the successor to Robbie Swifthand, a 2008 freeware game designed by Pixel Reign's co-founder Nick Larin. In the game, the player controls Robbie Swifthand, a common thief, who wakes up inside a temple and is told by a spirit that he has to save humanity from a demonic presence. The gameplay is characterized by unique, psychology-based level design, intended to trick players into being instantly killed.

Robbie Swifthand and the Orb of Mysteries was first released on Steam in December 2017, and was later ported to PlayStation 4, and the Nintendo Switch. The game has received positive reviews from game media and publications, and has gone on to win several accolades and award nominations.

== Gameplay ==
Robbie Swifthand and the Orb of Mysteries has three difficulty modes ("Not so hard", "Hard" and "Insanity") and contains over 90 ‘mind intriguing, psychology-based’ levels. Players control Robbie Swifthand, and attempt to reach the end of each level, represented by a colored portal, and are required to drop a golden orb in the portal to advance. As is typical of platform games characterized by their challenging difficulty, the levels in Robbie Swifthand and the Orb of Mysteries are short and their goals obvious, and can typically be finished in a matter of minutes, provided players are familiar with their secrets. Throughout the level, Robbie will need to avoid a variety of fatal obstacles, such as spikes, swinging axes, falling objects etc., or suffer a comedic, yet gruesome demise. The player has an unlimited number of continues in order to complete each level. Whenever Robbie dies, a small amount of blood will remain on the deadly surfaces that the player has touched, while a blue spirit will appear in the area where Robbie's dead body lands, as a reminder to players to be watchful of the area for traps.

Robbie Swifthand and the Orb of Mysteries utilizes typical platforming mechanics for players to traverse the environment and avoid traps, such as running, jumping, crouching and even flying. Furthermore, players are encouraged to plan ahead, and have the ability to move the screen to inspect the level and identify traps. There are no enemies to fight throughout the course of the game, with the exception of boss fights, each requiring a unique strategy to defeat. The gameplay of Robbie Swifthand and the Orb of Mysteries allows for some open-endedness as well as some order of difficulty. The player starts in a central hub, from which four worlds can be accessed. These worlds consist of a world map comprising dozens of levels, which can be selected from in order to gradually reach a final boss level.

== Plot ==
Robbie Swifthand is a self-involved common thief and burglar. At the start of the game, Robbie awakens in an abandoned tomb, and is told by a benevolent spirit that he needs to save mankind from the evil spirit that lives in it. Motivated only by the promise of treasure along the way, Robbie embarks on a quest to collect three crystals that will help him seal the villain in its tomb forever.

== Development ==
The original Robbie Swifthand was made entirely by Nick Larin, co-Founder of Pixel Reign. The game was developed in GameMaker, and was released as freeware in 2008. In the original, players control Robbie, a thief who wants to free a demon from an ancient temple in hopes of being handsomely rewarded. Development on Robbie Swifthand and the Orb of Mysteries began in 2017, when Larin teamed-up with music composer and sound designer Vicky Fysika and level designer Angelos Gkamiliaris to form Pixel Reign, and set out to fully realize the original's potential. The entire game was made within a year and a half by this team of three people.

The demo for Robbie Swifthand and the Orb of Mysteries was released on Game Jolt in July 2017, where it became the no. 1 platformer for 4 consecutive months. The game entered Steam Early Access on December 5, 2017 and featured the game's first two worlds, each one packed with 26 levels. The game's full release was announced on September 21, 2018. As the new game had switched to the Unity game engine, and had already garnered significant interest from the gaming community, Robbie Swifthand and the Orb of Mysteries was selected as a showcase game for the engine's 2D capabilities at Unite Berlin in 2018, which further brought Pixel Reign into contact with private investors in Greece, as well as game publishers.

On July 23, 2019 Robbie Swifthand and the Orb of Mysteries was ported to the PlayStation 4, published by East2west Games, with a Nintendo Switch port following on August 1 by Kiss Games.

== Reception ==
Robbie Swifthand and the Orb of Mysteries received several awards nominations, including the Nordic Game Discovery Contest 2019, the Indie Game Cup at White Nights 2018 in Prague and the Indie Prize at Casual Connect London 2018. The game was also a runner-up for "Greek Game of the Year" as voted by Greek media and entertainment website GameWorld.gr users in its annual Game of the Year Awards 2018.
