= Mummy: Tomb of the Pharaoh =

1996 video game

- Developer: Amazing Media
- Publishers: Interplay Productions, MacPlay
- Directors: Jeff McDonald; Keith Metzger; Loring Casartelli
- Producers: Loring Casartelli; Jeff McDonald; Keith Metzger
- Designers: Keith Metzger; David Parsons
- Writers: Jeff McDonald; Keith Metzger
- Composer: Márcio Câmara
- Platforms: Windows, Mac OS
- Release: September 5, 1996
- Genre: Adventure
- Mode: Single-player

Mummy: Tomb of the Pharaoh is a point-and-click adventure video game released on August 31, 1996, by Interplay Productions on Windows and by MacPlay, a division of Interplay Productions at the time, on Macintosh. It is a sequel to Frankenstein: Through the Eyes of the Monster. The game was developed by Amazing Media, directed and produced by Jeff McDonald, Keith Metzger, and Loring Casartelli, written by McDonald and Metzger, and composed by Márcio Câmara. Malcolm McDowell stars as Stuart Davenport, one of the main characters of the game.

== Gameplay ==
An in-game screenshot with hand-style cursor in view.

Players navigate various static frames via a hand-style cursor, and can also pick up items via cursor. They also have a standard inventory as a bar at the bottom of the screen which consists of items such as a lantern, ID card, backpack, and other items of interest they pick up during gameplay. These controls make it very easy and simple to navigate through menus and across terrain.

There is an aspect of danger, being able to be crushed by machinery or murdered by enemies during multiple choice situations, another feature of the game. There are also frequent puzzles that make use of the game's simple controls. Gameplay also features real-life actors, added in via green-screen.

== Plot ==
Mummy: Tomb of the Pharaoh is set in Egypt, at one of the fictional National Mining Company's mining sites. Michael Cameron, a representative of National Mining Company has been sent from New York City to deal with a rebellion of workers who believe a curse lies over the mining site due to the hieroglyph-covered box they mined up.

Upon arrival he meets Chris Crowley, manager of the site, and Stuart Davenport, representative on site. He becomes acquainted with Dr. Jerry Segal, the chief geologist and also reunites Lorrie, his ex-girlfriend and the mining site's Egyptologist. After the course of one night, Cameron has a dream of a mysterious man and then of Dr. Segal being attacked by someone. The next day, panic erupts as Dr. Segal is found murdered in the mines with the workers claiming he was killed by a mummy.

After solving numerous puzzles to gain access to the ancient egyptian tombs in the mines, Cameron eventually finds and kills the mummy, who is revealed to be the man that guards the entrance to the mines and afterwards the ghost of an ancient Egyptian priest named Simhotep (the man in his dream) appears, demanding Cameron's help in coming back from the dead.

Cameron finds a sacred scroll hidden in the ancient box and revives the priest, who then uses the sacred scroll to revive the wife of his pharaoh, with whom he'd had an affair in the past. Unfortunately, Lorrie, is used as a vessel for the queen's spirit.

The pharaoh's ghost eventually appears, providing Cameron with the means to defeat the magically empowered Simhotep. After defeating the priest, Cameron retrieves a valuable crystal that Davenport is hoping to find and sell for three-hundred million dollars alongside numerous artifacts from the tombs. The pharaoh's ghost reappears and says that Lorrie will recover from her brainwashing.

At the end of the game the artifacts are found deep in a grotto, guarded by Chris Crowley. Davenport kills Crowley and tells Cameron to hand over the power crystal, or Lorrie will be killed.

Depending on the player's choice, either Cameron gives the crystal up and Davenport tries to use it, but dies in the process or Davenport kills Cameron and Lorrie.

A series of text screens ensue.

In the good ending, Cameron and Lorrie go to the top of the mine and phone the authorities, who are not able to arrive before the tunnels collapse due to an earthquake and the artifacts are lost. The text also explains that Lorrie and Cameron return to New York City and resume dating, as well as that multiple attempts to excavate the artifacts fail due to following earthquakes. It is also learned that Stuart Davenport's body is never recovered, but that a man fitting his description is seen in the Amazon Jungle searching for Inca treasure.

== Development ==
Mummy: Tomb of the Pharaoh was developed by Amazing Media, and was released on August 31, 1996, by Interplay Entertainment on Windows and by MacPlay, a division of Interplay Entertainment at the time, on Macintosh. The project was announced at the 1996 Electronic Entertainment Expo on May 16, as the latest title of Interplay Productions. A month before the game was released, the Interplay web site featured an online contest "to coincide with the launch of this product", which featured hieroglyphic phrases being placed around the site that would then have to be converted to clues to inch closer to the $1000 cash prize.

Trish Wright, vice-president of marketing for Interplay, thought that the deep tombs of ancient Egypt offered the perfect setting for an adventure game, and hoped the combined efforts of Amazing Media's creative team and the veteran voice acting cast would result in a great game. Ten winners were announced for the PC version via the Interplay website, while others were announced for the Mac version via the Macplay website.

== Reception ==
Reception

Review scores
Publication	Score
GameSpot	4.8/10 (WIN)
Next Generation	2/5 (MAC)

Mummy: Tomb of the Pharaoh received poor reviews. For instance, Chris Hudak of GameSpot stated it was an "okay-looking, reasonably straightfaced, wonkily-balanced game experience not quite challenging enough for the long-time adventurer and not quite guiding enough for the newbie." Hudak added that there was "potential for a deeper backstory and more mythical involvement."

Liz Zivney of Adventure Classic Gaming wrote that the same was a "fine example" from the golden age of adventure video games, praising how the puzzles work with the narrative to create a sense of suspense and danger. Conversely, MetzoMagic reviewer Rosemary Young thought the game was average in every sense of the word. Angela Bennett of PC Gamer praised Malcolm McDowell in his villainous role, but noted that the game wouldn't feed adventure game fans who had been experiencing a recent drought in quality examples of the genre. A Next Generation critic also praised McDowell's performance and the quality of the cutscenes in general, but said the gameplay has nothing new to offer beyond that seen in other then-recent horror-themed adventure games.

Balmoral Software thought the game would appeal to Malcolm McDowell fans, but that it didn't have the depth found in other games of the genre such as Buried in Time. Matt Barton of ArmChair Arcade negatively compared the game to The Beast Within: A Gabriel Knight Mystery. Cathy Ormsby, a student at the Graduate School of Library and Information Science at the University of Texas, praised the title's game design, which saw strong story, environment, and gameplay enhanced through the choices in music, sound effects, graphics, and video clips. Tep Repeatedly reviewer Jen thought the game spent too much money on its cast and FMV scenes, and not enough on the actual game. The Computer Show reviewers thought it fell below the standard of Frankenstein: Through the Eyes of the Monster. Lynn Alford of PibWeb liked the "excellent" music, and "sometimes amusing" dialogue. Arinn Dembo of Game Center described the game as a Myst clone, and commented that those who don't like horror video games should stay away from the title. Computer Games Magazine reviewer Chuck Klimushyn thought that while the game followed a successful formula, this led to the title being a mediocre product.

In 1997, Mummy: Tomb of the Pharaoh and Frankenstein: Through the Eyes of the Monster were sold as a two-pack, found in bargain bins for $5. This bundle SKU sold 113,349 units in North America during the year 2001 alone, according to PC Data.

The game is currently preserved at the Strong Museum of Play.
