= Mystery Case Files =

American video game series

Mystery Case Files MCF
- Logo of the series
- Genres: Adventure, puzzle, hidden object
- Developers: Big Fish Studios (2005–2012); Elephant Games (2013–2014); Eipix Entertainment (2015–2019); GrandMA Studios (2020–present)
- Publisher: Big Fish Games
- Creator: Adrian Woods
- Platforms: Current: Windows, macOS; Previous: Nintendo DS, Nintendo 3DS, Windows Phone, iOS, Android, Wii
- First release: Mystery Case Files: Huntsville; November 14, 2005
- Latest release: Mystery Case Files: Fate's Carnival Remastered; September 25, 2026
- Spin-offs: list

Mystery Case Files is a video game series originally developed by the internal studios of Big Fish Games. Sequels were then developed by Elephant Games between 2013 and 2014 and Eipix Entertainment between 2015 and 2019. The newest installments have been developed by GrandMA Studios since 2020. The Mystery Case Files series is known for its hidden object puzzles where, in order to progress through a game, the player plays the role of a Master Detective and must find a certain number of items hidden somewhere on a painted scene.

In 2007, Big Fish Games estimated that "100 million people have at least sampled trial versions" of the Mystery Case Files games since the initial launch of Mystery Case Files: Huntsville.

The latest installment in the series, Mystery Case Files: House That Love Built, was released on November 26, 2025, and is the 28th game in the series.

== Gameplay ==
Mystery Case Files: Huntsville marked the introduction of the hidden object game – a genre of casual game in which a player must locate a list of objects which are hidden among many other objects on the computer screen. Once a player has located all the listed hidden objects, they progress on to the next area of gameplay. In case a player is unable to find a required object, many hidden object games offer a finite number of hints.

Like all Mystery Case Files titles, Huntsville relies heavily on hidden object gameplay. Upon completing each hidden object puzzle, players return to their Crime Computer where they solve subsequent puzzles in order to gather evidence and help pinpoint the thief. A player is given a limited amount of time to complete each puzzle. If the player fails to successfully complete a puzzle in this time, they must begin again with an entirely new scenario.

Prime Suspects relies heavily on hidden object gameplay as well, but introduces a new device that will only work if the player finds batteries in any hidden object scene. The device enables the player to see through walls to find the hidden object. The player has to gather evidence in a limited amount of time and deduce which suspect is most likely to have stolen the Queen's Hope Diamond.

Ravenhearst allows the player to gather the missing pages of Emma's diary by relying heavily on hidden object scenes. Puzzles are introduced to the gameplay as players must solve them to unlock each door in the manor in order to access the locked rooms. At the end of the game, keys must be found all around the manor in order to free Emma's soul from the mansion.

== Games ==
=== Huntsville (2005) ===
Mystery Case Files: Huntsville is the first installment in the Mystery Case Files franchise and was released in November 2005. The player takes the role of a master detective to solve a series of seemingly random crimes in the small town of Huntsville. The game features a number of locations to explore and introduced the Crime Computer which is still a main part of the series.

Following its release, Mystery Case Files: Huntsville broke all previous casual game sales records by over 100%, selling over $1 million worth of digitally distributed (downloaded) copies in under three months. As a result, it moved into the top 10 sales positions on all major casual game distribution websites.

It was initially released as an online game download for the PC and soon after for the Mac OS. In July 2006, Big Fish Games signed an agreement with Activision Value to distribute the game beginning in September at retail locations throughout the United States.

=== Prime Suspects (2006) ===
Mystery Case Files: Prime Suspects is the second installment and was released in April 2006. The player is tasked with investigating the disappearance of the Queen's Hope Diamond in Capital City. Prime Suspects added items that players have to discover to unlock later levels (such as finding a battery to power a flashlight). Characters also became a more prominent part of the series with the investigation revolving around multiple characters with different personalities.

Gamezebo noted the game had good art, story and replayability, but that later levels were repetitive and difficulty did not increase.

The Academy of Interactive Arts & Sciences nominated Prime Suspects for "Downloadable Game of the Year" at the 10th Annual Interactive Achievement Awards.

=== Ravenhearst (2006) ===
Mystery Case Files: Ravenhearst is the third installment in the series, was released in December 2006 and features an investigation centered on a mysterious manor located in England. Players find objects to unlock diary pieces to follow the life of Emma Ravenhearst, in the year 1894 in Blackpool. Through the diary entries, the player learns how Emma travelled from America to England to be a teacher and fell in love with a man named Charles Dalimar.

Ravenhearst introduced elaborate door puzzles to the series that were similar to a Rube Goldberg-type puzzle. It was re-released for the Nintendo DS in April 2013. Ravenhearst was "the third-best-selling PC title in the United States for the week ending in the annual Black Friday shopping splurge" selling 100,000 copies in six weeks.

=== Madame Fate (2007) ===
Mystery Case Files: Madame Fate is the fourth installment and was released in November 2007. The player investigates Madame Fate's Carnival and the carnival workers to see which one of them causes the fortune teller's death at midnight.

Madame Fate introduces more types of puzzles (including word puzzles and multiple crystal ball puzzles) while also changing the way a player can find items. Sometimes the player must combine two items on the screen, other times they must locate hidden areas to progress. The bulk of the game is still finding hidden objects, but there are a lot of other types of puzzles. The game also introduces morphing objects that players must find in each scene to unlock three secret areas that are located in the carnival. Madame Fate also introduced hidden object scenes inside hidden object scenes into the gameplay.

=== Return to Ravenhearst (2008) ===
Mystery Case Files: Return to Ravenhearst is the fifth installment in the franchise and was released in November 2008. This game is the second installment in the "Ravenhearst" story arc.

In addition to the hidden object scenes, which were characteristic for the first title of the Ravenhearst series, the publishers have "added a graphic adventure component that allows players to explore and interact with the world of Ravenhearst like never before". It is now possible to move through the Ravenhearst manor, the surrounding estate and collected items interact with the environment. Puzzles and hidden object scenes are integrated into the different locations throughout the game. These scenes are tagged with frequent twinkles to attract the player's interest. Return to Ravenhearst is the first installment of the Mystery Case Files series where "haunting performances from live actors" are used.

The Academy of Interactive Arts & Sciences nominated Return to Ravenhearst for "Casual Game of the Year" at the 12th Annual Interactive Achievement Awards.

=== Dire Grove (2009) ===
Mystery Case Files: Dire Grove is the sixth installment that was released in December 2009, with its first release one month earlier on November 25 as a Collector's Edition. It follows the events of four missing graduate students led by Alison Sterling (Davie-Blue Bacich) who travel to a small township near Blackpool, England.

Mystery Case Files: Dire Grove received mostly positive reviews. It has a Metacritic score of 82 and a GameRankings score of 75.00%.

Unfortunately it is difficult to get Mystery Case Files: Dire Grove to run on modern pc systems due to the game relying on Adobe Flash Player, which was discontinued on December 31, 2020.

However, BigFishGames announced in October 2026 that a new Digitally Remastered version of Mystery Case Files, Dire Grove is coming soon to players, with modern graphics and system compatibilities, and more. It was revealed that it is being released to buy on November 24th, 2026, and one day earlier for Game Club Members.

=== 13th Skull (2010) ===
Mystery Case Files: 13th Skull is the seventh installment and had its first release in November 2010 as a Collector's Edition. It follows the disappearance of Marcus Lawson after moving into a creepy mansion in Louisiana. His daughter, Magnolia, believes her father was kidnapped by the ghost of a vengeful pirate seeking to protect his lost fortune.

IGN reviewed 13th Skull as "Good" with a 7.0 rating for its presentation, gameplay, graphics, sound and lasting appeal for 6.5 to 7.5 per category.

=== Escape From Ravenhearst (2011) ===
Mystery Case Files: Escape From Ravenhearst is the eighth installment of the Mystery Case Files franchise and was released in November 2011 as a Collector's Edition. Some residents in Blackpool, England have gone missing around Ravenhearst Manor and the player, the Master Detective must return to the fire-ravaged manor and search for the missing residents. This game is the third installment in the "Ravenhearst" story arc.

=== Shadow Lake (2012) ===
Mystery Case Files: Shadow Lake is the ninth installment in the series and was the last to be released by Big Fish Studios. Shadow Lake was released in November 2012, and features actress Lea Thompson as Cassandra Williams, a psychic medium who helps the Master Detective solve puzzles while they investigate the mysterious destruction of a ghost town.

GameZebo gave it a 4 out of 5 rating.

=== Fate's Carnival (2013) ===
Mystery Case Files: Fate's Carnival is the tenth installment of the series and the first to be released by developer Elephant Games. Fate's Carnival was released in November 2013, and returns the player to Madame Fate's carnival, previously featured in the series' fourth installment, Madame Fate. Exploring the carnival vicinity with the help of Isis the cat, the game incorporates characters featured in previous games, as well as introducing new ones.

All About Casual Game gave it a 4.5 out of 5 rating, and called it a "remarkable" carnival experience that the players will not forget. The game was voted the "Talk of the Town" game by All About Casual Game readers for the Best of 2013 awards event.

=== Dire Grove, Sacred Grove (2014) ===
Mystery Case Files: Dire Grove, Sacred Grove is the eleventh installment of the Mystery Case Files franchise and was the last to be released by developer Elephant Games. Dire Grove, Sacred Grove was released in November 2014, and returns the player to the fictional township of Dire Grove, previously explored in the sixth installment of the same name.

All About Casual Game gave it a 4.5 out of 5 rating, saying the game is "a contender for the best game of the year" and awarding it an "Editor's Choice" distinction.

=== Key to Ravenhearst (2015) ===
Mystery Case Files: Key to Ravenhearst is the twelfth installment of the series and the first to be developed by Eipix Entertainment. Key to Ravenhearst was released in October 2015. Key to Ravenhearst is the fourth installment in the "Ravenhearst" story arc.

Gamezebo: 4.5/5; All About Casual Game: 4.5/5

=== Ravenhearst Unlocked (2015) ===
Mystery Case Files: Ravenhearst Unlocked is the thirteenth game in the casual adventure game series and published by Big Fish Games. Released in November 2015, it is the second game in the series to be developed by Eipix Entertainment. The mode is single-player and the platforms include Windows, Mac OS X, iOS and Android. It is the fifth part of the "Ravenhearst" storyline.

Gamezebo: 4.5/5; All About Casual Game: 5/5

=== Broken Hour (2016) ===
Mystery Case Files: Broken Hour is the fourteenth installment of the series. The Collector's Edition was released in November 2016. The Master Detective is sent by the Queen to the Huxley's Boarding House to search for George Pritchard, royal photographer and a friend of Her Majesty before time runs out.

All About Casual Game gave a full 5 out of 5 rating, saying the game is "complex, stunning, and compelling; just all-around sensational" and awarding it an "Editor's Choice" distinction. The game was voted the "Talk of the Town" game by All About Casual Game readers for the Best of 2016 awards event.

=== The Black Veil (2016) ===
Mystery Case Files: The Black Veil is the fifteenth installment of the series. The Collector's Edition was released in March 2017. The story is set in Dreadmond, a town in Scotland where people are mysteriously suffering from rapid aging.

All About Casual Game gave a 4.5 out of 5 rating. The game was voted the "Best Adventure Game" by All About Casual Game readers for the Best of 2017 awards event.

=== The Revenant's Hunt (2017) ===
Mystery Case Files: The Revenant's Hunt is the sixteenth installment of the series. The story follows a murder victim rising from the grave to bring justice to his killers. The Collector's Edition was released in November 2017.

All About Casual Game gave a 4 out of 5 rating, commenting that it was slightly disappointing for the fans.

=== Rewind (2018) ===
Mystery Case Files: Rewind is the seventeenth installment of the series. The gameplay of the game is based on the first four games of the series in basic hidden objects gameplay instead of point-and-click adventure gameplay as all the games since Return to Ravenhearst. The story brings back many of the previous games' characters through a time paradox. The game was released in June 2018, as the Collector's Edition version.

All About Casual Game gave a 4 out of 5 rating, saying that it was "an enjoyable trip down the memory lane".

=== The Countess (2018) ===
Mystery Case Files: The Countess is the eighteenth installment of the series. The story follows Lady Eleanor Codington, a friend of the Master Detective who went missing as she reclaimed her family estate.

All About Casual Game gave a 4 out of 5 rating, saying that it was "exciting haunted house adventure" even though it lacked complexity.

=== Moths to a Flame (2019) ===
Mystery Case Files: Moths to a Flame is the nineteenth installment of the series. The Master Detective is sent to the Zenith Museum of Oddities to investigate missing MCF agents.

All About Casual Game gave a 5 out of 5 rating, commenting that the game "is one of the franchise's...most complex and most all-around impressive titles to date".

=== Black Crown (2019) ===
Mystery Case Files: Black Crown is the 20th installment of the series and the last one made by Eipix Entertainment. It is a sequel to the 13th Skull game and was released in November 2019.

=== The Harbinger (2020) ===
Mystery Case Files: The Harbinger is the 21st installment of the series and the first one made by GrandMA Studios. The game was released in August 2020.

=== Crossfade (2020) ===
Mystery Case Files: Crossfade is the 22nd installment of the series. The game was released in November 2020.

=== Incident at Pendle Tower (2021) ===
Mystery Case Files: Incident at Pendle Tower is the 23rd installment of the series. The game was released in November 2021.

=== The Last Resort (2022) ===
Mystery Case Files: The Last Resort is the 24th installment of the series. The game was released in November 2022.

=== The Dalimar Legacy (2023) ===
Mystery Case Files: The Dalimar Legacy is the 25th installment of the series. The game was released in March 2023.

=== A Crime in Reflection (2023) ===
Mystery Case Files: A Crime in Reflection is the 26th installment of the series. The game was released in November 2023.

=== The Riddle of Mrs. Bishop (2024) ===
Mystery Case Files: The Riddle of Mrs. Bishop is the 27th installment of the series, and was released on November 26, 2024.

=== House That Love Built (2025) ===
Mystery Case Files: House That Love Built is the 28th installment of the series. The beta version was available for download for Big Fish Game Club members in June 2025 while the full game was released on November 26, 2025. The game revisits the Charles Dalimar / Ravenhearst story arc and also features Angelica Morgan from previous games The Dalimar Legacy (2023) and The Riddle of Mrs Bishop (2025). The game is published by GrandMa Studios.

=== Spin-off games ===
==== Agent X (2008) ====
Mystery Case Files: Agent X was released in April 2008, and is the first title in the Mystery Case Files franchise to be released for a portable device. Mystery Case Files: Agent X is only usable by Glu Mobile capable-cellphones.

==== MillionHeir (2008) ====
Mystery Case Files: MillionHeir was released in September 2008, and is the second game in the Mystery Case Files franchise to be released for a portable device. Mystery Case Files: MillionHeir was released exclusively for the Nintendo DS system and was published by Nintendo.

==== The Malgrave Incident (2011) ====
Mystery Case Files: The Malgrave Incident was released in June 2011, and is the second game in the Mystery Case Files franchise to be published by Nintendo. Mystery Case Files: The Malgrave Incident is playable for the Wii.

==== Spirits of Blackpool (2013) ====
Mystery Case Files: Spirits of Blackpool was released in October 2013, and is the first title in the Mystery Case Files franchise to be published for iOS. It was first released on the Canadian App Store and is playable for the Apple iPad. It was not released outside of Canada and was taken off the App Store.

==== Fragments of Truth: An MCF Story (2025) ====
Fragments of Truth: An MCF Story is the first spin-off instalment of the series, published for Windows 10/11 operating system PCs and developed by GrandMa Studios. It was released exclusively for Big Fish Game Club Members on 17 July, and general release on 18 July 2025. It was available initially only as a Collector's Edition that has extra features, wallpapers, and bonuses to find. The main gameplay story revolves around the MCF Agency's unsung heroes.

== Novel series ==
A four-novel mini series of books was distributed by Harlequin, and written by Jordan Gray.
