= The Shapeshifting Detective =

2018 video game

- Developer: D'Avekki Studios
- Publisher: Wales Interactive
- Engine: Unity
- Platforms: macOS; Nintendo Switch; PlayStation 4; Windows; Xbox One; iOS
- Release: November 6, 2018 iOS; February 20, 2019
- Genre: Adventure game
- Mode: Single-player

The Shapeshifting Detective is an adventure game developed by D'Avekki Studios and published by Wales Interactive. The player investigates a murder mystery and interviews suspects, who answer via full-motion video. It was first released in 2018. A prequel, Dark Nights with Poe and Munro, was released in 2020.

== Gameplay ==
Players control an unseen character from a first-person perspective who takes on the alias of Sam. Sam is a shapeshifter who can impersonate anyone after meeting them. Tasked with solving the murder of a local cellist, Sam interviews various suspects, including a trio of fortune tellers who predicted the murder. In each playthrough, the murderer is randomly selected from the pool of characters. When suspects become uncooperative, players can impersonate a friend or authority figure. Sam's dialogue is unvoiced, but impersonated characters are voice acted. When interviewing suspects, dialogue choices are chosen from a list. Risky dialogue choices are marked, and players can remove them from the list if they do not wish to risk following a dialogue tree. Otherwise, choices are permanent and can not be backtracked.

== Development ==
Wales Interactive released The Shapeshifting Detective for Windows, PlayStation 4, Switch, and Xbox One on November 6, 2018. It was released on iOS in February 2019.

== Reception ==
The Shapeshifting Detective received mixed reviews on Metacritic. Adventure Gamers wrote, "The Shapeshifting Detective is a unique game that provides a solid mystery with a creative twist on the usual means of information gathering." Gamereactor UK praised the acting, dialogue trees, and radio intermissions but felt the story was sometimes difficult to advance without trial and error. GameRevolution wrote, "The Shapeshifting Detective's pulpy charm and offbeat story show that it doesn't take a detective to figure out how enjoyable this game is." Push Square said the game was made with love, but its gimmicky gameplay is too basic. Criticizing the game's interactivity and pacing, Nintendo World Report said that The Shapeshifting Detective did not live up to its potential.
