= The Clockwork Man =

Greek video game series

- Logo of the series
- Genres: Adventure, hidden object
- Developer: Total Eclipse Games
- Publishers: RealGames (2009−2010); GameHouse (2010−2011); Total Eclipse Games (Steam)
- Creators: Argiris Bendilas; Dimitrios Bendilas
- Platforms: Windows, Mac OS X, Linux, Windows Phone, iOS, Android
- First release: The Clockwork Man; 18 March 2009; 17 years ago
- Latest release: The Clockwork Man: The Hidden World; 21 July 2010; 16 years ago
- Spin-offs: A Clockwork Brain

The Clockwork Man is a hidden object adventure video game series developed by Greek development studio Total Eclipse Games. Featuring a steampunk setting, The Clockwork Man games typically require players to find a certain number of items hidden somewhere on a painted scene, as well as solve a variety of adventure and logical puzzles in order to progress through the game.

The original The Clockwork Man was released in March 2009, with a sequel titled The Clockwork Man: The Hidden World released in July of the next year. A spin-off puzzle game titled A Clockwork Brain was released in 2012, exclusively for mobile platforms.

== Gameplay ==
The Clockwork Man games rely heavily on hidden object gameplay, wherein players must search each scene in a series of hand-painted, interactive tableaux for a number of objects listed at the bottom of the screen. Players collect these objects by clicking on them. Apart from object-finding, adventure-style puzzles are further introduced to the gameplay. Once all hidden objects have been collected, and all puzzles have been solved, players may progress to the next scene.

The Clockwork Man introduced a novel scroll and zoom mechanic, allowing players to zoom-in on scenes to get a closer look, as well as pan the camera left and right, which allows players to explore their surroundings using a parallax effect. In case a player is unable to find one of the objects, hints can be requested from the main character's sidekick, Sprocket the automaton, at the cost of depleting its energy supply (which is gradually restored over time).

Once players finish the main game, a "Freeplay" mode is unlocked, allowing players to replay any of the game's tableaux, featuring randomly generated positions for each of the objects players are tasked to find.

== Games ==
=== Main series ===
==== The Clockwork Man ====
The Clockwork Man is the first installment in The Clockwork Man franchise and was released on March 18, 2009. The game was published by RealGames. Set in an alternate timeline featuring a steampunk version of Victorian era London, the player takes on the role of Miranda Calomy, the last in a long line of engineers and inventors with a talent for problem-solving. Accompanied by Sprocket, an automaton Miranda built over the years, and which has developed sentience and personality, the duo embarks on a worldwide quest to find Miranda's long-lost grandfather, and help him compile the parts to the world's greatest invention.

The Clockwork Man was released as an online game download for PC, Mac and Linux, while a physical release was made available on Avanquest's GSP Click & Play label. In September 2011, Total Eclipse announced the game would be made available on Steam, along with its sequel, The Hidden World.

==== The Clockwork Man: The Hidden World ====
The Clockwork Man: The Hidden World, also known as The Clockwork Man 2, is the second installment in The Clockwork Man franchise, released on July 21, 2010 and published by GameHouse. It features the return of Miranda Calomy and Sprocket, this time embarking on a quest to find Miranda's parents, discover the titular Hidden World, and stop a group of conspirators from laying waste to it.

The game plays similar to its predecessor, relying heavily on hidden object gameplay and logical puzzles, albeit introducing some new features, such as a journal recording the player's progress and including clues and information useful for completing several stages in the game, as well as a map positioned in the lower right corner, which can be used to quickly travel between available locations.

The Hidden World was once again released as a downloadable game for PC and Mac by GameHouse, while a physical release was made available as part of Avanquest's GSP casual game catalogue, which bundled the game with the original The Clockwork Man title. It was later released on Steam by Total Eclipse, along with its predecessor in September 2011.

=== Spin-off games ===
==== A Clockwork Brain ====
A Clockwork Brain was released in 2012 and is the first title in The Clockwork Man franchise to be released for portable devices. A Clockwork Brain features an assortment of one-minute puzzles, designed to test players' perception, logic, pattern recognition skills etc. With a distinct visual identity blending Victorian-era steampunk aesthetics and Mayan art, A Clockwork Brain's gameplay draws heavy inspiration from games like Big Brain Academy and Who Has The Biggest Brain?. The game features Sprocket, the automaton character of previous The Clockwork Man games, as the players' guide.

Puzzles in A Clockwork Brain are not tied to any particular story, and have no real sense of progress, meaning not one puzzle has greater priority over the other. Each challenge features 4 mini-games in sequence, each one lasting exactly one minute, and featuring adaptive difficulty to match players' improving skills. Six more mini-games were developed by Total Eclipse and offered as downloadable content through in-app purchases.

Since its initial release on the App Store on February 15, 2012, A Clockwork Brain eventually became the number one free Educational Game app in the Store. To date, the game has been downloaded over 2.5 million times, and has been highlighted as one of the 500 best apps in the world for 2013 by The Sunday Times.

The game was eventually released on the Windows Store on December 19, 2015, and on the Google Play Store on December 24, 2015.
