= She Sees Red =

2019 video game

- Developer: Rhinotales
- Publisher: Rhinotales
- Platforms: macOS; Windows; Nintendo Switch; Xbox One; PlayStation 4
- Release: macOS, Windows: WW: 11 July 2019; Nintendo Switch: NA: 13 May 2020; EU: 15 May 2020; Xbox One: WW: 19 August 2020; PlayStation 4: WW: 29 October 2021
- Genre: Interactive thriller
- Mode: Single-player

She Sees Red is a 2019 interactive thriller video game developed and published by Rhinotales for macOS, Windows, Nintendo Switch, Xbox One, and PlayStation 4.
