= Frankenstein: Through the Eyes of the Monster =

1995 video game

- Windows cover art
- Developers: Amazing Media; Alexandria (Saturn); Tachyon Studios (Saturn)
- Publisher: Interplay
- Platforms: Windows; Mac OS; Sega Saturn
- Release: Windows: NA: 1995; EU: 1995; Mac OS: NA: October 3, 1995; Sega Saturn: EU: 1997
- Genre: Point-and-click adventure
- Mode: Single player

Frankenstein: Through the Eyes of the Monster is a point-and-click adventure video game that stars Tim Curry as Dr. Frankenstein, and has the player controlling a newly created Frankenstein monster. Other cast members include Robert Rothrock as the voice of the monster, Rebecca Wink as villager Sara, and Amanda Fuller as Gabrielle, the monster's daughter. It used full motion video clips and 3D CGI graphics similar to Myst. The game was developed by Amazing Media and published by Interplay Entertainment Corp for the PC in 1995 and for the Sega Saturn in 1997. The game was given a "Teen" rating by the Entertainment Software Rating Board, but was originally rated as K-A. A port for the Atari Jaguar was in development but never released.

There are two situations in the game where the player's actions decide the fate of a certain character, branching the game into multiple endings.

In 1996 Interplay and Amazing Media released a sequel, Mummy: Tomb of the Pharaoh.

== Plot ==
Scientist Phillip Werren's daughter Gabrielle is killed in unexplained circumstances and Phillip is charged with her murder and hanged by Judge Rothenbush. Dr. Frankenstein believes that life is created by a mysterious energy called "Energy L", and that a compound he has discovered called "lifestone" can be used to channel Energy L and reanimate deceased tissue. After several failed attempts at this process, he brings Phillip back to life as his monster in his laboratory. His memories hazy, Phillip explores Dr. Frankenstein's castle, collecting his notes in order to recreate the process by which he reanimates the dead. During his exploration, Phillip unknowingly releases a second Frankenstein monster from captivity and comes across another of the doctor's experiments, a talking reanimated hand called Dirt. Enraged that Phillip has been stealing his notes, Dr. Frankenstein throws him in the dungeon and tortures him.

Phillip escapes the dungeon and resumes his exploration, discovering documents which note that before his death, he had developed a protein cream that could regenerate damaged tissue. Dr. Frankenstein was funding his research, which served as the foundation for Dr. Frankenstein's discovery of Energy L. Phillip also discovers notes that connect Dr. Frankenstein to the corrupt Judge Rothenbush and reveal that Dr. Frankenstein was sexually attracted to Phillip's late wife.

Phillip confronts Dr. Frankenstein about his discoveries, but Dr. Frankenstein draws his gun and Phillip flees. He is aided in escape by Sara, a woman from a nearby village who has come to the castle to ask Frankenstein for help in finding her sister, one of several children who have gone missing throughout various villages and towns. It is revealed that Vladimir, a man who has been supplying Dr. Frankenstein with illegal materials, has been working with Judge Rothenbush and that the judge is behind the disappearances of the children, though his motives are never explained. Dr. Frankenstein is disgusted with this conspiracy and plants a bomb to kill both Vladimir and Judge Rothenbush. Phillip and Sara attempt to stop the bomb, but fail. Gabrielle, who was among the disappeared children, is killed in the explosion.

Phillip attempts to finally recreate Frankenstein's lifestone materials and procedure in order to resurrect Gabrielle. The game has multiple endings depending on whether the player recreates the operation correctly as well as whether Sara is saved from the second monster and from a castle trap.

- If the player succeeds in resurrecting Gabrielle, the two escape Dr. Frankenstein's castle and start a new life together. If the player fails to revive Gabrielle, Phillip is locked in Dr. Frankenstein's dungeon forever and Gabrielle's body is put into storage for future experiments.
- If the player manages to keep Sara alive, she reunites with her sister and tries to expose Judge Rothenbush's corrupt dealings. Though nobody believes her. If the player fails to save Sara, she too is placed into storage by Dr. Frankenstein for future experimentation.

Regardless of the player's actions, Vladimir and Judge Rothenbush survive Dr. Frankenstein's bomb and both flee the Dr. Frakenstein's wrath. As for Dr. Frankenstein, that's another story.

== Reception ==
Reception

Review scores
Publication	Score
Adventure Gamers	2/5 (WIN)
AllGame	4.5/5 (MAC)
Next Generation	3/5 (MAC); 1/5 (WIN)
Maximum	2/5 (WIN)
Computer Game Review	91/81/86
MacUser	3/5
Sega Saturn Magazine	74% (SAT)

In 2001, Frankenstein's bundle SKU with Mummy: Tomb of the Pharaoh sold 113,349 units in North America, according to PC Data.

Maximum assessed that "This is basically a Myst style game, and offers nothing new to excite RPG [sic] fans. The action is slow and laborious, and whilst the 3D graphics look cool, they're simply not interesting enough to keep players riveted." A critic for Next Generation gave the Macintosh version a rave review, applauding the FMV sequences, photorealistic visuals, "seamless video integration", strong sense of horror, and intelligent puzzles. He concluded that "This is a class act, shy of 'stunning' only by the mannered nature of its subject matter"; despite this, he scored it only 3 out of 5 stars. However, a later review of the PC version in the same magazine, but presumably by a different critic, gave the opposite view. The critic panned the game for illogical and tedious puzzles and nonsensical story, and summarized the game as "a trip through a truly boring and noninteractive environment that's sure to give you nightmares, but not of the kind intended." Gary Cutlack of Sega Saturn Magazine praised the acting but ultimately dismissed the game as "standard interactive puzzle fare." German magazine MAN!AC was similarly critical of the Saturn version, awarding it 43% and faulting its slow-paced gameplay and limited interactivity.

== Reviews ==
- Australian Realms #28
