= Erotica Island =

2001 video game by Redfire Software

- Developer: Redfire Software
- Publisher: Flare Media Limited
- Platform: Microsoft Windows
- Release: UK: 23 March 2001
- Mode: Single-player

Erotica Island is a 2001 X-rated video game developed by Redfire Software and published by Flare Media Limited. It was BBFC 18 Certified.

== Production ==
Bonusweb.cz described the graphics as being of the manga style. The developers described the title as similar in tone and gameplay to Leisure Suit Larry.

The game was exhibited by Flare Media Ltd. at an expo, with hostesses in pink dresses promoting the game. The developers wanted to release the game during February 2001, ideally on Valentine's Day. The game went on sale on March 21, 2001 in Britain, and those in other countries could purchase the game online.

While Flare Media assured Bonusweb.cz many times that they would send a demo of the game, they never did. Bonusweb.cz was only able to review the game after a community member who had bought the game sent it to them.

== Plot and gameplay ==
The player is the billionaire Reggie Rich whose plane crashes on an island. The only way to escape is on a boat. However the owner lends it for $10,000. He offers to lend it for $100 if the player seduces all the girls on the island.

== Reception ==
Reception

Review scores
Publication	Score
GameCaptain.de	14%
PC Games	1%
Four Fat Chicks	0/5

Erotica Island was panned by critics. Four Fat Chicks called the game "crap", with "no redeeming value, social or otherwise". Video game database Spong described it as a "perverted, poor attempt". Bonusweb.cz criticised the game's graphics. GameCaptain.de gave the game a rating of 14 out of 100.

German gaming magazine PC Games strongly criticized Erotica Island, calling it "shit" and an "idiotic pseudo-adventure" with "atrociously bad" graphics, and gave it an overall score of one percent. PC Games summarized the game as a whole as a game about "small dicks and big boobs ... and absolutely nothing at all", further stating bluntly that "if you play this game longer than five minutes, it's your own fault."
