= Darkfall Unholy Wars =

2013 video game

- Developer: Aventurine SA
- Platform: Microsoft Windows
- Release: NA: 16 April 2013; EU: 16 April 2013; Steam: 25 April 2013
- Genre: MMORPG
- Mode: Multiplayer

Darkfall Unholy Wars was a massively multiplayer online role-playing game developed by Aventurine SA. It was announced on 18 September and is a sequel to Darkfall. It is a PvP MMORPG where players are encouraged to form clans and battle for dominance across Agon, the fantasy world in which the game takes place.

The initial launch date was 20 November 2012, but it was postponed.

On 28 November 2012, Darkfall Unholy Wars was submitted on Steam Greenlight. Two days later, the game was greenlit by the community.

On 11 December, Aventurine announced another launch delay due several internal and external factors. Instead of commercial release, the company decided to offer beta access to all customers who would pre-order the game. After a lengthy 5-month beta, the game was released on 16 April 2013.

Game service was discontinued at the end of May, 2016.

== Gameplay ==
=== Interface ===
The Darkfall Unholy Wars graphical user interface was mostly based on first-person shooter and action games.

=== Character progression ===
The character progression system in Darkfall Unholy Wars is based on prowess. Prowess can be gained from any game interaction. The amount of prowess that a player gains depends on the difficulty or rarity of each achievement. It can be used as a form of currency to acquire different skills and boosters while spending prowess is the only way to improve the character's attributes, combat, and harvesting skills.

=== Roles and skills ===
The new roles system introduced in Darkfall Unholy Wars requires the player to pick up a role, along with two schools from that specific role. One of the schools is set by the player as the primary and the other as the secondary, and each school contains four skills/spells, and the ultimate, the most powerful in that school. The biggest difference between the primary and secondary schools is that players can use only the ultimate from their primary school. The skills/spells available in the secondary school have full potential, but require more mana and stamina, and have increased cooldowns and charging times compared to the primaries.
