= Spycraft: The Great Game =

1996 video game

- Developer: Activision
- Publisher: Activision
- Director: Ken Berris (live action)
- Producer: Andrew Goldman
- Designers: Juan Carlos Coto; Larry Galka; Jeffrey Sullivan; Bruce Onder
- Programmer: Tom DeSalvo
- Artists: Gary Brunetti; Wyndham Chow; David Dalzell; Derek Friesenborg; J. Christopher Lopez
- Writer: James Adams
- Composer: Jeehun Hwang
- Platforms: MS-DOS, Windows 95, Mac OS
- Release: NA: March 5, 1996
- Genre: Adventure
- Mode: Single player

Spycraft: The Great Game is an adventure CD-ROM game published by Activision in 1996. It details the attempted assassination of the President of the United States and the CIA and SVR attempts to save him. Although the game was not approved by either organization, it tends to favour realism due to its coordination with former CIA director William Colby and former KGB Major-General Oleg Kalugin, who also appear in the game as themselves. The game also stars James Karen, Dennis Lipscomb, Joseph Ruskin, Tim De Zarn, Kirk B.R. Woller, Allan Kolman, Chase Masterson and Charles Napier in prominent roles.

== Plot ==
The player plays Thorn, a rookie CIA agent. During training, Thorn receives word that the Russian presidential candidate has been assassinated, and during a live-fire exercise, Thorn's instructor is killed. Thorn learns that a former CIA agent (codenamed "Harmonica") is behind both hits.

After travelling to Moscow, one of the team, Parker, winds up dead at the hands of Harmonica and the other, Lange, is missing. During Thorn's travels, Thorn meets an SVR agent named Yuri Gromchevsky. With his help, Thorn learns that a mercenary agency called "Procat" has been hired to kill the Russian presidential candidate and President Brooks at the signing of the END nuclear treaty. After researching Procat, Thorn heads to London to speak with John Blake, a former MI6 agent who killed the former leader of Procat. It appears that Procat is functioning under the leadership of a new man, codenamed "Mirage". Although he has no idea where Mirage is, Blake provides Thorn with a folder of intelligence on Procat. Names listed in the file include a former FBI agent codenamed "Grendel" (Kirk Woller) and other living and deceased members of Procat.

In Moscow, Thorn heads to an informant's house only to find Lange. Lange sold Parker out to Procat, leaving Thorn with no choice but to kill his former colleague. Thorn learns that there is a mole in the CIA and that a "nuclear pit" has been stolen by members of Procat and is being sold to a former CIA asset and current Punjabi gunrunner/terrorist named "Onyx". Thorn travels to Heidelberg and meets with Onyx, who reveals the pit is being exchanged at a factory that evening. Several options are given to the player: Thorn lets Onyx go, but he warns Grendel, who kills Thorn at the deal; Thorn goes in, guns blazing, killing Grendel and recovering the pit; or Thorn poses as Onyx, taking the pit without gunplay, but Onyx escapes.

After intercepting several transmissions between Mirage and the mole, Thorn heads to Tunisia to intercept them. However, they have clearly been tipped off; only Mirage is there. After killing Mirage's goons, Thorn learns that Mirage is none other than John Blake. Blake gets the jump on Thorn, but his gun jams and Blake is held at gunpoint by Thorn. The player is given the option to kill Blake or let him go. The DCI offers Thorn congratulations either way, noting that they will "take care of Blake".

In a helicopter, Thorn opens Blake's computer, which is rigged to explode. Thorn downloads a portion of the files, then tosses the computer from the helicopter. Thorn uses these files to send a message to the mole to root him out, requesting a meeting at a dacha in Crimea. Thorn's first priority, however, is the president. After returning to Moscow, Thorn hunts down Harmonica and just as he is about to kill the president, Thorn comes to the rescue and finishes Harmonica. The DCI congratulates Thorn but notes the mole is still a threat. Thorn heads off with Yuri to Crimea.

When they get to Crimea, it turns out that it is the retreat for the replacement candidate for the Russian presidency. He is sitting there with his campaign manager, and after Yuri accuses him of hiring Procat, it is revealed that his campaign manager actually did the job. By killing his predecessor, it allowed the candidate to run for presidency, and by killing the president of the United States, the Russians would keep their nuclear arsenal. As Yuri is about to arrest the manager, the mole arrives. It is none other than Thorn's boss, DDO Warhurst. Warhurst betrayed his country because he could not stand the fact that his superior was appointed by the President. Thorn's support officer, Jaimie Seaton, sends a burst of static through Warhurst's earpiece, briefly throwing his aim off and allowing Thorn to shoot Warhurst.

Yuri restrains the manager and the candidate congratulates Thorn on a job well done. Yuri, however, seems intent on throwing the candidate in jail. Because the candidate is ahead in the polls and now supports the END treaty, it is Thorn's job to protect him. There are two final options presented to the player:

1. Shoot Yuri. Thorn gets a medal back at home and a vacation in Fiji. The Russian elections go smoothly and the new candidate seems intent on forging a good relationship with the U.S.
2. Do not shoot Yuri. Although this is easier on the player's conscience, Thorn is fired when he returns home for refusing to follow orders. Meanwhile, in Russia, chaos ensues and the old President declares martial law and seals himself off from the U.S.

If Thorn fails to recover the nuclear pit, the final scene is marred by a catastrophic nuclear explosion.

== Gameplay ==
The PDA interface

The game's narrative follows a linear path, pausing between interstitial movie-like videos featuring various protagonists, at which point the player is required to solve puzzles and challenges. The linear path splits in the game's final scenes, providing two alternative endings.

== Development ==
Spycraft was developed on a budget in excess of $3 million. It was promoted in part by an official website with information and daily updates about the game's development and release schedule, which was highly unusual at the time. Parts of the game were coded in HTML to enable it to update elements like news reports and character dossiers in real time via the internet. The game's script was written by James Adams, a noted author of non-fiction books on espionage. While Spycraft was still in development it was announced that there would be a home conversion for the Sega Saturn to be released in August 1996 but it was never released. In mid-1996, Universal Pictures acquired the license to make a film based on Spycraft. A DVD-ROM version was also announced at COMDEX 1996, becoming one of the first games to make use of the format. GOG.com released an emulated version for modern Windows systems in 2012.

In a 2024 documentary by Polygon, producer Ken Berris recalled an on-set incident where one of the extras hired for the full-motion video scenes recognized Kalugin–who was talking to Berris at the time–and confronted the former KGB general for the death of their father.

== Reception ==
Reception

Review scores
Publication	Score
Computer Game Review	92/100
Computer Games Strategy Plus	4/5
Computer Gaming World	4.5/5
Edge	8/10
GameSpot	7.1/10
Macworld	4/5
Next Generation	4/5
PC Gamer (US)	89%
PC PowerPlay	9/10
PC Zone	91/100
PCMag	3/4
PC Entertainment	4/5

Award
Publication	Award
Codie awards	"Best Adventure/Role-Playing Software Game" (finalist)

The game shipped more than 140,000 units worldwide by June 1996.

A Next Generation critic commented of the game, "It's linear. It's packed with FMV. And yet, amazingly, not only does it not suck, it's actually an extremely good game." He praised the well-crafted plot, excellent acting, challenging yet logical puzzles, and the realism invoked by the downloading of current news from the game's website. He found the linearity to be hardly noticeable while playing, and said the game overall is a rare instance of an interactive movie which is both challenging and genuinely enjoyable. He scored it four out of five stars.

The editors of Macworld gave Spycraft their 1996 "Best Multimedia Game" award. Steven Levy of the magazine praised the game's "intricacy and playability", and argued that it is "better than a le Carre novel [at] conveying the dirty tricks and covert actions necessary to be a spook". GameSpot's editors named it the "Best Interactive Movie" and "Best Game That No One Played" of 1996, and called it "an experience that is both intelligent and thrilling."

Spycraft was a finalist for the Computer Game Developers Conference's 1996 "Best Script, Story or Interactive Writing" Spotlight Award, but lost the prize to You Don't Know Jack XL. It was also nominated for Computer Gaming World's "Adventure Game of the Year" and Computer Game Entertainment's "Best Adventure Game" awards, both of which ultimately went to The Pandora Directive. However, Spycraft won Computer Gaming World's "Readers' Choice" award in this category.

In 2000, a Computer Games Strategy Plus retrospective summarized Spycraft as an "underrated spy-thriller [that] was one of the best real-world adventures." In 2011, Adventure Gamers named it the 90th-best adventure game ever released.
