= Riana Rouge =

1997 video game

- Cover art
- Developer: Black Dragon Productions
- Publisher: Black Dragon Productions
- Producers: Gillian Bonner, Josh Caine
- Writer: Nancy Oliver
- Platforms: Windows 95, Mac OS
- Release: 1997
- Genres: Adult, action-adventure
- Mode: Single-player

Riana Rouge is a 1997 adult action-adventure game developed and published by Black Dragon Productions. It is one of the few titles that have earned an "Adults Only" rating from the ESRB.

== Plot ==
The game stars Playboy Playmate Gillian Bonner as Riana, a shy secretary who spies on her boss attempting to rape a co-worker. She enters the office and tries to help her, but she is overpowered by her boss and thrown out of the window. Somehow, she is transported to another world where she is a seductive warrior who must rescue the world from an evil dictator (her boss) and rescue her friend (the co-worker).

== Development ==
Riana Rouge was distributed by Konami of America, and cost $1 million to produce.

== Gameplay ==
The game had an interface which allowed players to control the heroine using an "emotivator", which determines the course of action according to whether the player chooses to feel seductive, compassionate, or afraid.

== Reception ==
German gaming magazine PC Player gave the Windows version of Riana Rouge an overall score of 19%, and PC Joker gave it an overall score of 35%.

The game sold 100,000 copies.
