= Conspiracies II – Lethal Networks =

2011 full motion video adventure video game

- PC box cover
- Developer: Anima Interactive
- Publisher: Anima Interactive
- Producer: Anestis Kokkinidis
- Designer: Anestis Kokkinidis
- Programmer: Micahel Georgoulopoulos
- Writer: Marina Kokkinidou
- Composer: Kostas Kalampokas
- Platform: Microsoft Windows
- Release: WW: March, 2011
- Genres: Adventure, Interactive movie
- Mode: Single player

Conspiracies II – Lethal Networks (Greek: Συνωμοσίες 2: Φονικά Δίκτυα) is a FMV adventure video game developed and published by Greek studio Anima Interactive. It is the sequel to the 2003 video game Nick Delios - Conspiracies. Set in a dystopian future, and taking place several months after the events of the previous game, players again take on the role of series protagonist Nick Delios, a special government agent framed for attempted murder, and uncover a massive conspiracy that could threaten humanity.

== Gameplay ==
In Conspiracies II, players take control of protagonist Nick Delios and can navigate 3D environments in first-person, search for clues, and use inventory items, some of which can be taken apart or combined with others, thus making up the majority of the game's puzzles. In addition, Lethal Networks incorporates action game elements, such as the character climbing and crouching, as well as physics-based pushing or pulling of large objects and vehicle driving. Contrary to the first game, Conspiracies II features game over screens, in which case players have to restart from a previously saved game.

Similar to the previous game, Lethal Networks makes use of full motion video technology, meaning characters, with whom the player interacts, are played by real actors and actresses, while the game's environmental graphics are in 3D. The plot unfolds throughout the game's twelve chapters, and features two different endings.

== Story ==
Conspiracies II is set in the year 2063, and takes place several months after the events of the first Conspiracies. Earth has recently joined a conglomerate body of alien governments known as the Peripheral Galactic Alliance, expecting a significant improvement of its dystopian situation. Players once again take on the role of Nick Delios, who has given up his career as a private investigator and taken on the role of a government secret agent, tasked with uncovering the alien civilizations' true agenda for Earth.

Delios soon finds himself entangled in another intergalactic conspiracy, after he is framed for the attempted murder of his ex-fiancé Annita Argyriou, the sister of the corporate tyrant Dimitris, and current president of the powerful company Detronics S.A. During his quest to clear his name, Delios uncovers multiple conspiracy networks, hidden agendas, lies and corruption throughout the Peripheral Galactic Alliance, which threaten the fate of entire universe.

== Development and release ==
Fueled by the commercial success of the first Conspiracies game, development on Conspiracies II began at the end of 2004, with a projected release date set for mid 2008. The game stuck in development hell for eight years however, as it was significantly delayed after Anima's lead programmer quit the project, which resulted in the development team having to build the real-time graphics engine from scratch. Conspiracies II eventually released in March 2011.

== Critical reception ==
Conspiracies II received mixed reviews from critics upon its release.

Ray Ivey of Just Adventure found the acting in the game to be "amateurish", but acknowledged that "if you have the patience to deal with the endless exposition-filled dialogs, the dreary and unintuitive environments, the fussy interface, and the bad acting, there's actually a lot of game here". GameBoomers gave the game a B−, confessing that "well before I finished Lethal Networks, it felt like a chore rather than an adventure. Which is a shame. It isn't a bad game at all, just a “messy” game". Astrid Beulink of Adventure Gamers gave the game 3 out of 5 stars, claiming that "as it is, this won't be the game to revive flagging popular interest in FMV adventures, but the ongoing saga of Nick Delios should still appeal to those who like live-action adventures and futuristic sci-fi mysteries".

== See also ==
- Conspiracies (video game)
