= Conspiracies (video game) =

2003 full motion video adventure video game

Nick Delios - Conspiracies
- PC box cover
- Developer: Anima Interactive
- Publishers: NA: Got Game Entertainment; UK: GMX Media
- Producer: Anestis Kokkinidis
- Designer: Anestis Kokkinidis
- Programmer: George Mponaros
- Writer: Marina Kokkinidou
- Composer: George Koukiaris
- Platform: Windows
- Release: NA: October 29, 2003; UK: June 25, 2004
- Genres: Adventure, Interactive movie
- Mode: Single-player

Nick Delios - Conspiracies (Greek: Νικ Δέλιος - Συνωμοσίες), known also as Conspiracies, is a FMV adventure video game developed by Greek studio Anima Interactive and published by Got Game Entertainment in North America, with GMX Media handling distribution in Europe. It is the first installment in the Conspiracies series of video games, and the first Greek adventure game to receive an international retail release. A sequel, Conspiracies II - Lethal Networks, was released in March 2011.

== Story ==
Conspiracies is set in a futuristic 21st century, where human society is threatened by a destroyed natural environment, overpopulation, poverty, organized crime and increasing forms of depression and neurological diseases. Earth has dissolved into a single federation of cities. Greece, where the game takes place, is one of them. Every city-state has its own governor and local government, which is subject to the Supreme Federal Government. Beneath the surface however, political lobbies, big companies, and organized crime impose their own will, surpassing the law and creating their own reality.

Nick Delios, the protagonist, had been a top student at the university of Thessaloniki, specializing in medical software. His career however takes a turn for the worse when the head of his scientific research team, Dimitris Argyriou, a member of the scientific and business elite, presents Nick΄s revolutionary research on electronic transplants programming as his own. Nick is subsequently laid off the team, while his wedding to Dimitris' sister Annita is cancelled. Deeply hurt, and plagued by gambling and drinking problems, Nick ends up earning a living as a detective, specializing in cases of industrial espionage, using his acquaintances in the underworld.

When Thanos Pekas, Police Inspector and old friend of Delios, asks him unofficially to help solve a murder case of a small-time crook, Nick accepts. However, Delios soon comes to realize that the case is far more complex than he initially thought, involving multiple conspiracies that surpass even the borders of the planet itself.

== Release ==
In August 2003, Anima Interactive signed with publisher Got Game Entertainment to release Conspiracies in North America later that year. In April 2004, GMX Media announced that it had secured the rights to publish the game in the UK. The UK version of Conspiracies was eventually published on June 25, 2004.

== Critical reception ==
Reception

Aggregate score
Aggregator	Score
Metacritic	53/100

Review scores
Publication	Score
Adventure Gamers	3.5/5
Computer Gaming World	1/5
GameZone	6/10
PC Gamer (US)	23%

The game received "mixed" reviews according to the review aggregation website Metacritic. Computer Gaming World said, "Although the vocally overdubbed actors try to give decent performances, Conspiracies' overall quality is so much like a B movie that you'll be surprised no killer tomatoes ever attack - and you just might be praying that they do."

PC Gamer game reviewer Chuck Osborn awarded the game a rating of 23% in its January 2004 issue, to which Anestis Kokkinidis, CEO of Anima Interactive, retaliated by sending a critical letter accusing the magazine of promoting style over substance, concluding that "We feel sorry that you’re not supporting us independent developers at all." PC Gamer published the letter in their March 2004 issue, to which Osborn replied, "Sadly, Conspiracies received a 23% because of its confounding plot and pathetic gameplay. To answer your question: Yes, we enthusiastically support small developers – we just don't support bad games."

== Sequel ==
Development on a sequel began at the end of 2004, with a projected release date set for mid 2008. After having been stuck in development hell for 8 years, Conspiracies II - Lethal Networks was released by Anima Interactive in March 2011.
