= List of snowboarding video games =

This is the list of snowboarding video games.

== Franchises ==
- 1080° Snowboarding
- Cool Boarders
- ESPN Winter X-Games Snowboarding
- Snowboard Party
- SSX

== Games ==
Title	Platform	Release date
Heavy Shreddin'	NES	June 1990
Tommy Moe's Winter Extreme: Skiing & Snowboarding	Super NES	April 28, 1994
Val d'Isère Skiing and Snowboarding	Atari Jaguar	December 9, 1994
Cool Boarders	PlayStation	August 30, 1996
Winter Gold	Super NES	November 28, 1996
Zap! Snowboarding Trix	Sega Saturn	February 21, 1997
Cool Boarders 2	PlayStation	October 31, 1997
Steep Slope Sliders	Sega Saturn	November 30, 1997
Snowboard Kids	Nintendo 64	December 27, 1997
1080° Snowboarding	Nintendo 64	March 31, 1998
Downhill Snow	PlayStation	May 28, 1998
Cool Boarders - Arcade Jam	Arcade	1998
Alpine Surfer	Arcade	February 21, 1996
X Games Snowboarder	Arcade	2017
Snow Wave: Avalanche	PC	1998
Cool Boarders 3	PlayStation	September 30, 1998
Twisted Edge Extreme Snowboarding	Nintendo 64	October 11, 1998
ESPN X Games Pro Boarder	Windows, PlayStation	November 10, 1998
Snowboard Kids Plus	PlayStation	January 21, 1999
Big Air	PlayStation	February 28, 1999
Freestyle Boardin' '99	PlayStation	February 28, 1999
Snowboard Kids 2	Nintendo 64	February 3, 1999
Extreme Wintersports	PC	April 30, 1999
MTV Sports: Snowboarding	PlayStation	September 30, 1999
Trick'N Snowboarder	PlayStation	October 19, 1999
Rippin' Riders Snowboarding	Dreamcast	October 31, 1999
R: Rock'n Riders	PlayStation	January 4, 1999
Cool Boarders 4	PlayStation	1999
Supreme Snowboarding	PC	October 27, 1999
Cool Boarders Pocket	Neo Geo Pocket Color	February 24, 2000
MTV Sports: Pure Ride	PlayStation, Game Boy	September 30, 2000
Big Mountain 2000	Nintendo 64	October 10, 2000
ESPN Winter X-Games Snowboarding	PlayStation 2	October 26, 2000
SSX	PlayStation 2	October 30, 2000
Cool Boarders 2001	PlayStation, PlayStation 2	October 31, 2000
Tech Deck Snowboarding	PC	November 2000
Snowboard Heaven	PlayStation 2	November 16, 2000
Cool Boarders: Code Alien	PlayStation 2	December 21, 2000
Soul Ride	PC	December 21, 2000
Snowboarding	PlayStation	December 20, 2000
SSX Tricky	Xbox, GameCube, PlayStation 2, Game Boy Advance	November 6, 2001
Shaun Palmer's Pro Snowboarder	PlayStation 2, Game Boy Advance, Game Boy	November 13, 2001
Amped: Freestyle Snowboarding	Xbox	November 19, 2001
Dark Summit	PlayStation 2, Xbox, GameCube	November 26, 2001
Jonny Moseley Mad Trix	PlayStation 2, Game Boy Advance	December 26, 2001
ESPN Winter X-Games Snowboarding 2002	Xbox, PlayStation 2, Game Boy Advance	2002
Alpine Racer 3	PlayStation 2	28 March 2002
Slope Rider	Mac	August 2002
Snowboard Park Tycoon	PC	September 24, 2002
Transworld Snowboarding	Xbox	October 29, 2002
Stoked Rider	PC	2002
Snow Wave: Avalanche	PC	2002
Disney Sports Snowboarding	Game Boy Advance	April 2, 2003
Evolution Snowboarding	GameCube, PlayStation 2	February 25, 2003
SSX 3	PlayStation 2, Xbox, GameCube, Game Boy Advance, Gizmondo	October 20, 2003
Amped 2	Xbox	October 28, 2003
Championship Snowboarding 2004	PC	September 11, 2003
1080° Avalanche	GameCube	January 12, 2003
Stoked Rider ft. Tommy Brunner	PC	April 2005
SSX On Tour	PlayStation 2, PlayStation Portable, Xbox, GameCube	November 10, 2005
Amped 3	Xbox 360	November 16, 2005
SBK: Snowboard Kids	Nintendo DS	November 22, 2005
Stoked Rider: Alaska Alien	PC	December 14, 2006
SSX Blur	Wii	February 27, 2007
Drop Point: Alaska	Mac	January 2, 2008
Shaun White Snowboarding	Xbox 360, PlayStation 3, Wii, PlayStation 2, PC, PlayStation Portable, Nintendo DS	February 27, 2007
Project Powder	PC	2008
Snowboard Riot	Wii (WiiWare)	February 2, 2009
Stoked	Xbox 360, PC	February 26, 2009
We Ski & Snowboard	Wii	March 3, 2009
Shaun White Snowboarding: World Stage	Wii	August 11, 2009
Triple Crown Championship Snowboarding	Wii	February 23, 2010
SSX	PlayStation 3, Xbox 360	February 28, 2012
Mark McMorris Infinite Air	Windows, PlayStation 4, Xbox One	October 25, 2016
Snow	Windows, Linux, PlayStation 4	November 25, 2016
Steep	Windows, PlayStation 4, Xbox One	December 2, 2016
The Snowboard Game	Windows	April 24, 2018
Carve Snowboarding	Oculus Quest 1/2	May 27, 2021
Riders Republic	Windows, PlayStation 4/5, Xbox One, Xbox Series X/S	October 28, 2021
Grand Mountain Adventure: Wonderlands	Windows	March 10, 2022
Shredders	PlayStation 5, Xbox Cloud Gaming, Windows, Xbox Series X/S	March 17, 2022

== Mobile platforms ==
Title	Platform	Released date
Extreme Air Snowboarding	Mobile phone	December 31, 2003
Final Fantasy VII Snowboarding	Mobile phone	March 29, 2005
Big Mountain Snowboarding	iOS	
Pure Snowboarding	iOS	November 21, 2013
Snowboard Trick List	iOS, Android	February 29, 2012
Grand Mountain Adventure	Android	March 27, 2019
Grand Mountain Adventure: Snowboard Premiere	iOS, Android	January 22, 2020
Grand Mountain Adventure 2	iOS, Android	February 18, 2025
iStunt	iOS	
MyTP Snowboarding	iOS	
Shaun White Snowboarding: Origins	iOS	December 4, 2009
Go Diego Go! Snowboard Rescue	iOS	May 23, 2010
SnoShred	iOS	June 23, 2010
Snowboard with Sal Masekela	iOS	
XPEED Snowboard	iOS	
Super Trick Snowboarder	iOS	August 1, 2011
Snowboard Commando	iOS	
Sketch Snowboarding	iOS	
Slope Rider	iOS	
Snowboard Hero	iOS	
Snow Board	iOS	August 17, 2011
SummitX Snowboarding	iOS, Android	December 15, 2011
Fresh Tracks Snowboarding	iOS	
Alto's Adventure	iOS, Android, Kindle Fire, Windows	February 19, 2015
Snowboard Party	iOS, Android, Windows	September 29, 2015
Snowboard Party: World Tour	iOS, Android, Windows	November 30, 2016
Snowboard Party: Aspen	iOS, Android, Windows	December 19, 2017

== See also ==
- Snowboarding video game
- Sports game
