= Steep Slope Sliders =

1997 video game

- Developer: Cave
- Publishers: JP: Victor Interactive Software; WW: Sega; JP: Capcom (Arcade)
- Director: Yasuyuki Hirota
- Producers: Yasuo Ono; Kenichi Takano
- Programmers: Akiyoshi Hanai; Seiji Iwakura
- Composers: Takehiro Sibasaki; Toru Wada
- Platforms: Sega Saturn, Arcade
- Release: Sega Saturn: JP: October 23, 1997; NA: December 16, 1997; EU: January 16, 1998; Arcade: JP: 1998
- Genre: Sports video game
- Modes: Single player, multiplayer
- Arcade system: Sega ST-V

Steep Slope Sliders (スティープ・スロープ・スライダーズ, Sutīpu Surōpu Suraidāzu) is a 1997 video game that was made for the Sega Saturn and Sega Titan ST-V arcade system. It was developed by a collaboration of Victor Interactive Software, and the Cave Company. The game was released by Victor Interactive Software in Japan and by Sega in other territories. Capcom released the arcade version. The game was met with positive reviews, drawing favorable comparison to other snowboarding video games for its sharp graphics, innovative design, and intuitive control system.

== Gameplay ==
Players can either race for the best possible time or perform tricks to earn the most freestyle points, with half-pipe and snowboard park courses available for the latter choice. A ghost mode is included, allowing players to compete against a saved run. The game features seven standard courses, including downhill runs set in different countries, an alpine course, a half-pipe and a snowboard park. The courses feature obstacles, jumps and alternative routes that players can exploit to improve their times and trick scores.

Additional courses and characters can be unlocked through gameplay, including unconventional bonus environments and novelty snowboarders.

While UEP Systems' Cool Boarders system of executing moves is extremely regimented by a combo interface, Steep Slope Sliders' allows the player far more autonomy. Instead of actually holding in a direction while jumping (similar to the system that the SSX snowboarding series uses), everything was based on the face buttons that were pressed, but the method of performing tricks was completely based on the Jamma configuration that was used in the arcades. Many other Sega arcade ports were like this as well, most notably Die Hard Arcade, Virtua Fighter: Remix, Virtua Fighter Kids, Radiant Silvergun and Winter Heat.

In the Saturn version, the Saturn's internal clock is utilized to change the in-game setting to reflect the time of day in the real world.

== Reception ==
Reception

Aggregate score
Aggregator	Score
GameRankings	77% (SAT)

Review scores
Publication	Score
Consoles +	93%
Edge	7/10
Electronic Gaming Monthly	7.875/10 (SAT) (Note: Four critics of Electronic Gaming Monthly gave the Saturn version 8.5/10, 7/10, 8.5/10, and 7.5/10.)
EP Daily	8.5/10
Famitsu	28/40
Game Informer	7.75/10 (SAT)
GameRevolution	B−
GameSpot	7/10 (SAT)
Hyper	80%
Next Generation	4/5 (SAT)
Sega Saturn Magazine	92% (SAT)

Steep Slope Sliders was met with positive reviews. The Saturn version held a 77% on the review aggregation website GameRankings based on four reviews. Critics praised the game for having varied course designs which accommodate exploration and experimentation, tight controls, numerous unlockables, and fast-moving graphics.

Game Informer concluded that Steep Slope Sliders was a strong entry in the snowboarding genre but still fell second to its competitor, the PlayStation's Cool Boarders 2. However, most critics held that Steep Slope Sliders had edged out Cool Boarders 2 as the superior snowboarding game. In particular, a number of reviews commented that Steep Slope Sliders has relatively little pop-up and polygon breakup, which was often cited as the biggest shortcoming of the Cool Boarders series. However, Joe Fielder of GameSpot argued that the biggest advantage Steep Slope Sliders holds over Cool Boarders 2 is that the controls are more accessible and easier to learn. At the same time, he concluded that the lack of a multiplayer mode or AI opponents to race against keep Steep Slope Sliders from being a truly great game instead of just a good one. The lack of multiplayer was a common criticism against the game.

Next Generation gave Steep Slope Sliders a strong recommendation, deeming it one of the deeper entries in the genre due to its innovative course design and tricks. Electronic Gaming Monthly's four-person review team similarly deemed it the most fun and replayable snowboarding game for consoles, with Shawn Smith going so far to say it was in his personal top ten Saturn games of all time. Sega Saturn Magazine called it "the most realistic and enjoyable translation of the sport to date." GamePro summed up that "A healthy variety of courses, fun gameplay, fast-moving graphics, and responsive controls make this an appealing game for snowboard aces and novices alike." (Note: GamePro gave the Saturn version 3.5/5 for graphics, 3.5/5 for sound, 4.0/5 for control, and 4.0/5 for fun factor.)

Reception in continental Europe was mixed to positive. French magazine Joypad awarded Steep Slope Sliders 88%, praising its responsive controls, trick system and enjoyable gameplay while being more critical of its visual presentation and sound. German magazine MAN!AC gave the game 67 out of 100. The magazine praised its accessible controls and variety of courses and tricks, but considered its presentation technically unimpressive and felt that it lacked the depth and polish of stronger snowboarding games. Italian magazine Mega Console was considerably more positive, awarding the Japanese version 88 out of 100. Although criticising its relatively modest graphics, the magazine praised its sound, playability, variety of modes and courses, and regarded it as an entertaining and accessible snowboarding game.

== Sequel ==
Cave made a follow-up game called Trick'N Snowboarder, released in 1999.
