= Cool Boarders (video game) =

- Genre: Snowboarding
- Developers: UEP Systems; Idol Minds
- Publishers: UEP Systems; Sony Computer Entertainment; 989 Studios; Sega; SNK Playmore
- Platforms: PlayStation, PlayStation 2, Dreamcast, Neo Geo Pocket Color, Arcade
- First release: Cool Boarders; August 30, 1996
- Latest release: Cool Boarders: Code Alien; December 21, 2000

Cool Boarders is a series of snowboarding video games developed by UEP Systems and published by Sony Computer Entertainment.

Aggregate review scores
Game	Metacritic
Cool Boarders	(PS) 74% (Note: GameRankings score)
Cool Boarders 2	(PS) 70%
Cool Boarders 3	(PS) 71%
Rippin' Riders Snowboarding	(DC) 69%
Cool Boarders 4	(PS) 67%
Cool Boarders 2001	(PS) 56/100 (PS2) 78/100

== Main series games ==
- Cool Boarders, 1996
- Cool Boarders 2, 1997
- Cool Boarders Arcade Jam, 1998
- Cool Boarders 3, 1998
- Cool Boarders 4, 1999

== Spin-offs ==
- Rippin' Riders Snowboarding, 1999
- Cool Boarders Pocket, 2000
- Cool Boarders 2001
- Cool Boarders: Code Alien, 2000
