= Shredders (video game) =

2022 video game

- Developers: Foampunch (I-Illusions, Let It Roll)
- Publisher: Foampunch
- Composer: Jennifur
- Engine: Unity
- Platforms: PlayStation 5 Windows; Xbox Series X/S
- Release: 2022-03-17 (PC, Xbox); 2022-12-06 (PS5)
- Genre: Snowboarding
- Modes: Single-player, Cooperative multiplayer

Shredders is a 2022 snowboarding video game developed and published by Foampunch. It tasks the player to complete missions on a snowboard, such as racing or performing tricks. The game released on March 17, 2022 for Windows and Xbox Series X/S. It was later ported to PlayStation 5. It received mixed reviews.

== Gameplay ==
Shredders is a sports video game focused on snowboarding. The player controls a snowboarder in third-person, going around an open world map. Various tricks can be performed, such as grinding. It is also possible to hang to a snowmobile or a winch. A rewind feature is available that allows to reverse time in case of poor landing or a missed trick. Different snow surfaces inflict different properties, with freshly fallen snow being more slippery, for example.

The single-player campaign features missions that task the player on going down different mountaneous environments and complete tasks such as racing an opponent or doing a specific trick, culminating in a cross-race. Beating missions and their respective bonus objectives unlocks in-game cosmetics, including clothing and gear from licensed brands, such as Burton Snowboards, DC Shoes, K2 Sports, The North Face, Vans and Volcom. Missions can be replayed after completion for higher scores and faster times. Game replays and photo mode can also be accessed. Connecting to the Internet allows the player to see other players snowboarding, though you can't interact with them; a private session can be hosted so that only friends can appear.

Shredders features various real life snowboarders as playable characters, such as Arthur Longo, Jamie Anderson, Zeb Powell, Sebbe De Buck and Marcus Kleveland, though their faces are obscured behind ski masks and goggles. The game's soundtrack was composed by Ghent-based producer Hector Devriendt, known as Jennifur. The music was later released in an album Nowhere, Now Here.

== Development ==
Shredders was developed and self-published by Foampunch, a development studio formed in collaboration between I-Illusions and Let It Roll. Narrative director Chris Hanney stated that the development team "tried to build a snowboarding experience that allows you to define your own style" and "took a lot of inspiration from a whole bunch of awesome snowboarding films, the Amped games from the original Xbox [...], and our snowboarding heroes on Instagram".

Shredders was announced in 2021 during Microsoft and Bethesda's E3 2021 showcase. The game was scheduled to release in December 2021 but was later delayed to March 17, 2022. It released for Windows and Xbox Series X/S as a timed exclusive before eventually being ported to PlayStation 5 on December 6 of the same year. In November 2025, a physical special edition of the game titled Full Ride Edition was released exclusively for PlayStation 5, featuring downloadable content.

== Reception ==
Reception

Aggregate scores
Aggregator	Score
Metacritic	72/100 (PC); 66/100 (XSX)
OpenCritic	24% critics recommend

Review scores
Publication	Score
Jeuxvideo.com	14/20
NME	3/5

Shredders received "mixed or average reviews", according to the review aggregator website Metacritic.

NME rated the game 3/5, praising the controls and the soundtrack, but criticizing the writing and the lack of an in-game trick list. Pure Xbox gave the game seven stars out of ten, praising the gameplay, open world and missions, while criticizing the story and voice acting as well as noticeable pop-in. Rock Paper Shotgun called Shredders a "love letter" to snowboarding, praising the mission variety and the game's atmosphere. Windows Central complimented the game's graphics and progression, but noted the game's "frequent performance issues" on Xbox Series X, such as frame rate drops; similar performance problems were later reported on PlayStation 5. Jeuxvideo.com called the physics engine "solid" and animations "up-to-date", while praising the "easy to learn, hard to master" gameplay approach, though called the graphical user interface "confusing and impractical".

The game has been compared to 1080° Snowboarding, Amped, SSX, Steep and Riders Republic, though certain publications noted the game's focus on realistic gameplay as opposed to arcade-style handling in other games.
