= Work accident =

Occurrence during work that leads to physical or mental harm

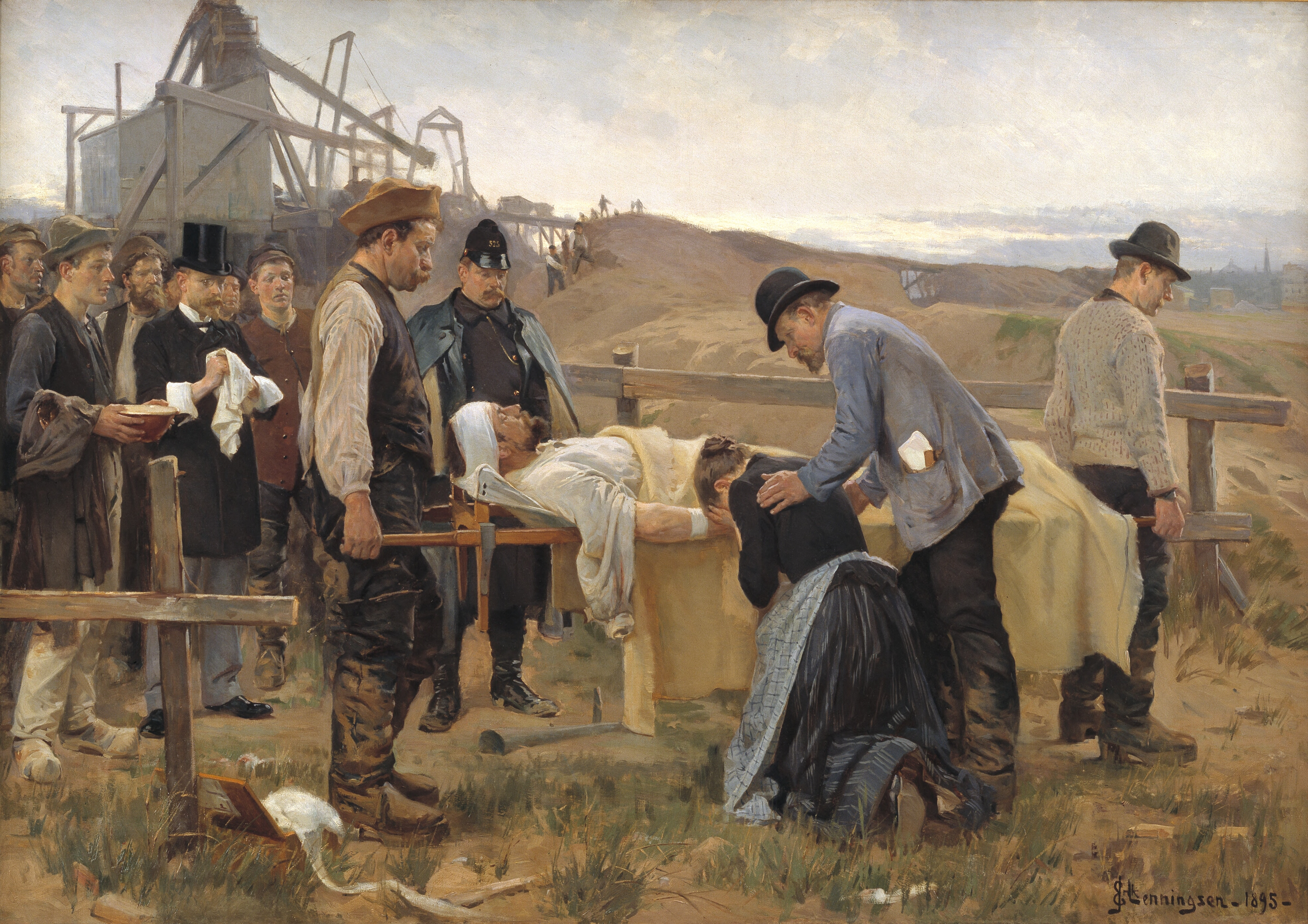
Erik Henningsen's painting A wounded worker from the National Gallery of Denmark

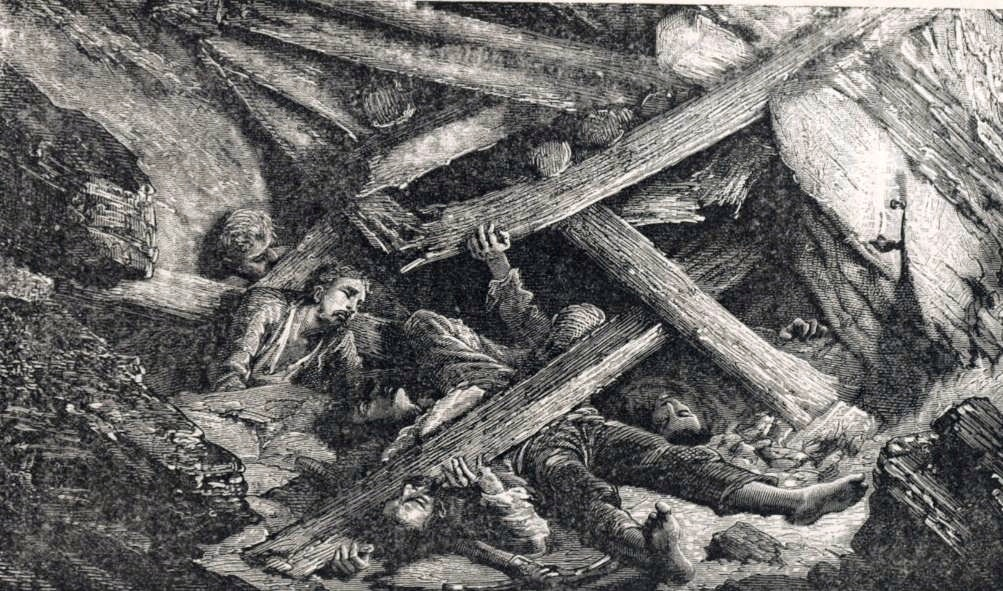
A 19th century work accident in a mine

A work accident, workplace accident, occupational accident, or accident at work is a "discrete occurrence in the course of work" leading to physical or mental occupational injury. According to the International Labour Organization (ILO), more than 337 million accidents happen on the job each year, resulting, together with occupational diseases, in more than 2.3 million deaths annually.

The phrase "in the course of work" can include work-related accidents happening off the company's premises, and can include accidents caused by third parties, according to Eurostat. The definition of work accident includes accidents occurring "while engaged in an economic activity, or at work, or carrying on the business of the employer" according to the ILO.

The phrase "physical or mental harm" means any injury, disease, or death. Occupational accidents differ from occupational diseases as accidents are unexpected and unplanned occurrences (e.g., mine collapse), while occupational diseases are "contracted as a result of an exposure over a period of time to risk factors arising from work activity" (e.g., miner's lung).

Incidents that fall within the definition of occupational accidents include cases of acute poisoning, attacks by humans and animals, insects etc., slips and falls on pavements or staircases, traffic collisions, and accidents on board means of transportation in the course of work, accidents in airports, stations and so on.

There is no consensus as to whether commuting accidents (i.e. accidents on the way to work and while returning home after work) should be considered to be work accidents. The ESAW methodology excludes them; the ILO includes them in its conventions concerning health & safety at work, although it lists them as a separate category of accidents; and some countries (e.g., Greece) do not distinguish them from other work accidents.

A fatal accident at work is defined as an accident which leads to the death of a victim. The time within which the death may occur varies among countries: in Netherlands an accident is registered as fatal if the victim dies during the same day that the accident happened, in Germany if death came within 30 days, while Belgium, France and Greece set no time limit.

Where the accidents involve multiple fatalities, they are often referred to as industrial disasters.

== Statistics ==
There are some industries in which individuals are more exposed to occupational hazards than others, such as the construction trade. This had the highest rate of fatal injuries out of all other industry sections in Europe in 2023. In UK, falls accounted for 51% of construction injuries resulting in death.

The Health and Safety Executive reported that, between 2011 and 2012, incidents such as falls from height, becoming trapped by a falling structure, and being struck by a vehicle or moving object, were the reasons for the majority of fatalities to British workers.

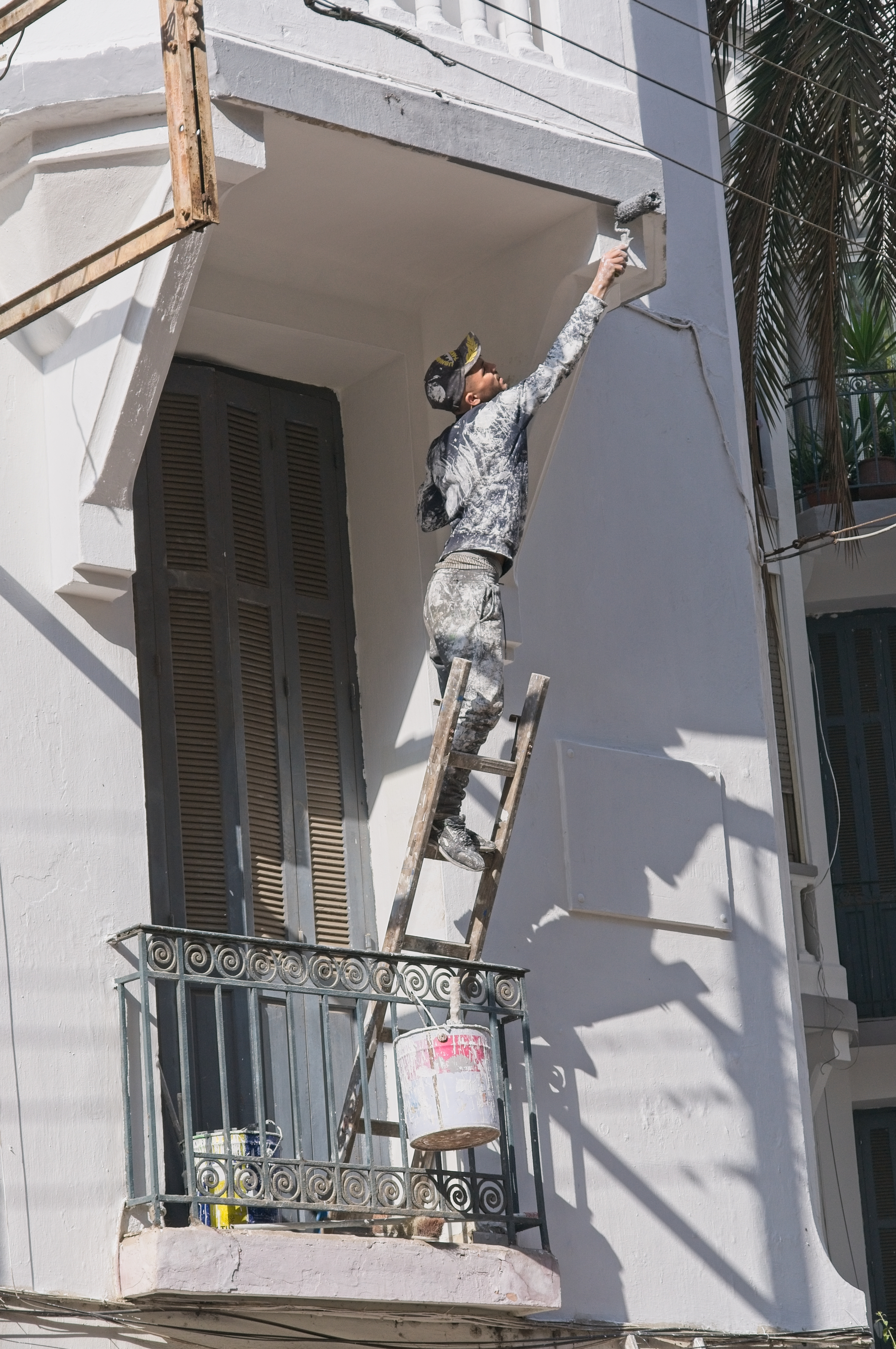
A Moroccan worker, precariously balanced on a ladder set up on a balcony and without any fall protection, repaints a façade in Casablanca, Morocco, on 07/01/2023

It was also revealed that slips, trips or falls were responsible for more than 50% of serious injuries to employees. Furthermore, the majority of incidents that resulted in employees taking more than three days off work – or affected their ability to perform their usual duties over this period – were caused by handling accidents.

Although some accidents at work can have minor effects, the cumulative impact of workplace injuries is significant, translating into an estimated loss of 70 million lost days of work and approximately 540 million days of lost production time in the U.S., in 2023.

In Europe, France has the higher rate of fatal and non-fatal accident at work.

== Causal factors ==
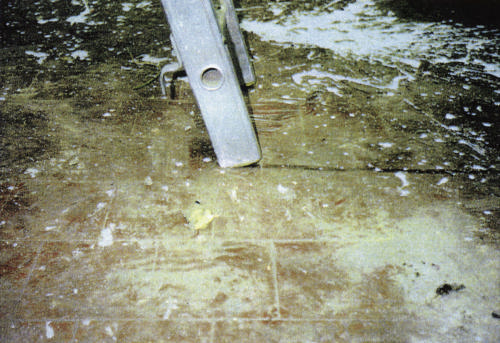
Skid mark from a faulty ladder.

Accidents arise from unsafe behavior and/or unsafe conditions. An important factor is the safety climate or safety culture of an organization. Safety culture concerns how workplace safety is managed, consisting of the shared attitudes, beliefs, perceptions, and values among employees. Faulty equipment can also cause serious personal injuries, a common example being accidents from faulty ladders. If the rubber feet are absent, the base of the aluminium stile can slip suddenly on a hard floor and the user can fall.

== Benefits of prevention ==
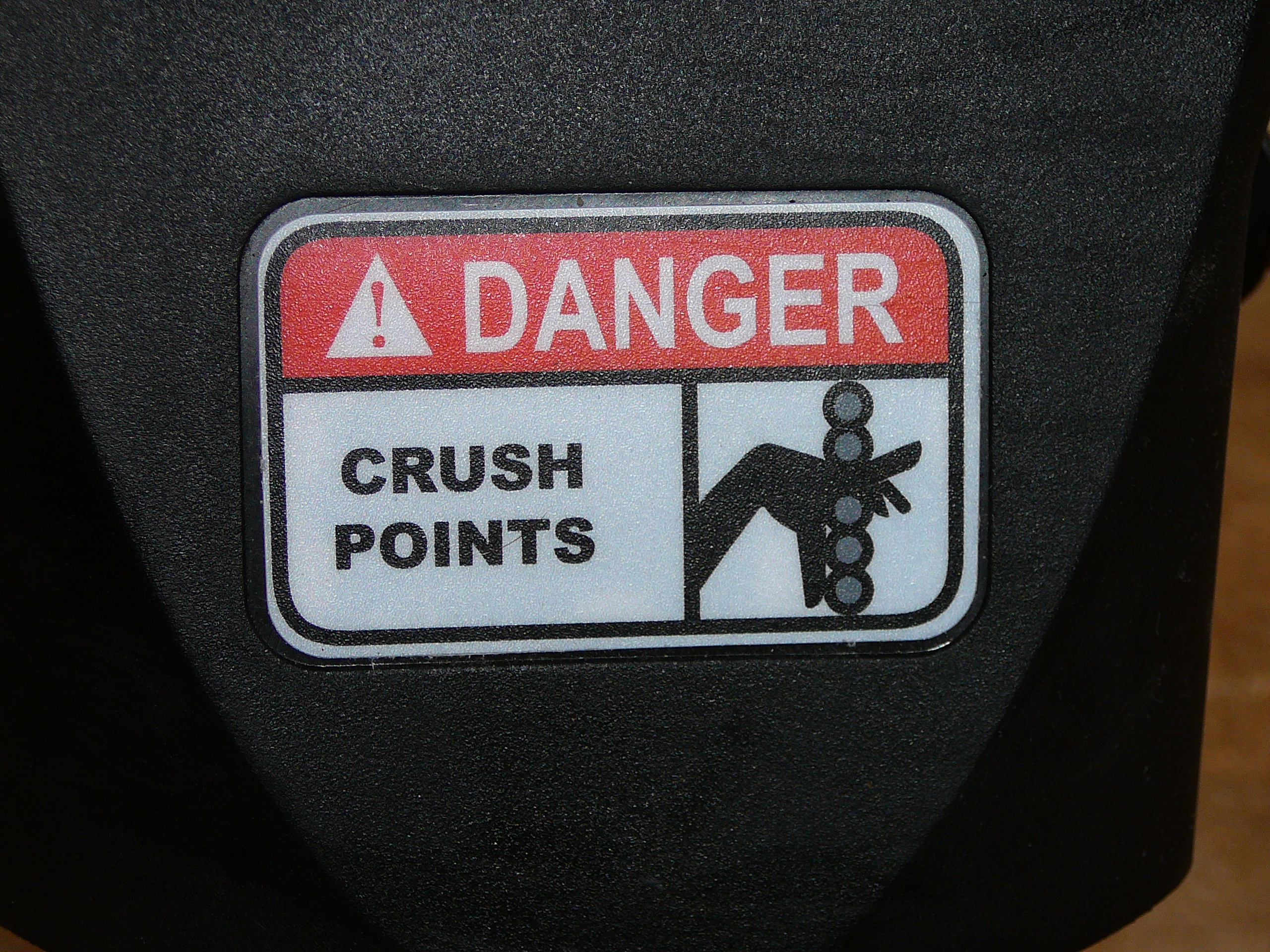
Health and safety warning sign

According to the Health and Safety Executive, employers who implement suitable measures to prevent accidents in the workplace could reap a number of benefits. As well as reducing the number of injuries at work, managers could also:

- Be less likely to suffer legal action
- Acquire a better reputation amongst partners, investors, customers and suppliers
- Have employees who feel more motivated, demonstrating greater productivity
- Reduce costs
- Have reduced employee turnover and absence rates. It has been reported that over 2,000,000 working days each year are lost due to handling accidents and slips and trips alone. In Argentina, the work accident rate in the year 2018 decreased 10% from the previous year.

== Determining liability ==
Depending on the circumstances of a workplace accident, several different parties may be held liable. These may include the employer, employees, property owner, manufacturer, or other third parties. For example, if it can be proven that an employer was negligent by allowing unsafe working conditions to persist, they may be held responsible for any resulting accidents or injuries. But most of the time employers enjoy impunity. In France they don't go to jail even when they are convicted of Negligent homicide, 75% of them got suspended prison terms and only 1.6% actually go to jail. This can be explained by the system for compensating workplace accidents and occupational diseases that exist in this country, which make individual responsibility less important since damages are compensated by the collective.

== Examples ==
Phineas Gage was a railroad worker who suffered a catastrophic brain injury due to an accident in 1848. While using an iron rod to pack explosive powder into a hole, a spark from the rod ignited the powder, which drove the rod through his skull, destroying most of his left frontal lobe. He survived the accident and became an important case study in the field of neuroscience.

In 1974, 18-year-old Disneyland employee Deborah Gail Stone was killed by the apparatus of the America Sings attraction, barely a week after the attraction had opened. She accidentally fell into the narrow gap between the central stage and the revolving inner wall of the seating area, and was crushed to death by the movement of the carousel. Stone's family successfully sued Disneyland and the attraction was temporarily closed while new safety features were implemented, eventually shutting down permanently in 1988.

In 1979, American factory worker Robert Williams reported to work at a Ford Motor Company assembly plant in Michigan. Williams was one of the operators of the factory's robotic retrieval system, which took parts to and from racks on a large shelving unit. He was instructed to retrieve some parts manually from the storage rack, reportedly because the machine was running too slowly due to an undiagnosed malfunction. When the still operating robot entered the area of shelving he was in, a protruding arm smashed into his head, killing him instantly. He was the first person known to have been killed by a robot. In a similar incident, a 22-year-old contractor was killed in 2015 at a Volkswagen production plant in Baunatal, Germany. While he was setting up a stationary industrial robot meant to grab and manipulate automobile components, the robot arm prematurely activated, grabbing him and crushing him against a metal plate.

=== Film and entertainment industry ===
There were a few accidents during the production of the Lord of the Rings film series. In one scene, Aragorn (Viggo Mortensen) kicks a heavy metal helmet toward the camera and cries out in frustration, believing Merry and Pippin dead. Mortensen had in fact broken two of his toes from the impact and had cried out in pain; this was the take used in the final film. In another scene, Sam (Sean Astin) wades into a river barefoot in pursuit of Frodo. On one take Astin impaled his foot on a shard of glass, despite the prior efforts of the production crew to sweep the riverbed. Also for a scene in the film, a serious accident was narrowly averted, when Aragorn battles Uruk-Hai leader Lurtz (portrayed by stuntman Lawrence Makoare), and Lurtz throws a knife at Aragorn. Makoare was supposed to miss on purpose, but the poor visibility afforded by the mask he had to wear caused him to misjudge his aim and accidentally throw the knife straight at Mortensen's face. Mortensen instinctively deflected the knife with his own sword, and this shot is included in the final cut.

In 2009, stuntman David Holmes was paralysed while serving as Daniel Radcliffe's body double for a scene in Harry Potter and the Deathly Hallows. The stunt involved the use of suspension wires to simulate Harry being thrown around during a fight and crashing into a wall. A fault with the pulley system caused Holmes to crash into the wall at an uncontrolled speed and break his neck, leaving him quadriplegic.

In 2014, 27-year-old camera assistant Sarah Jones was killed and six other crew members were injured while filming the movie Midnight Rider on an active railway trestle over the Altamaha River near Doctortown, Georgia. The crew was filming a dream sequence involving a metal-framed hospital bed placed on the tracks, when a freight train approached. While the crew members were able to move out of the direct path of the train, they did not have time to remove the bed. The resulting collision sent debris flying which fatally injured Jones, while several other crew members were struck or injured. The production did not have permission from railway operator CSX to film on the tracks. Director Randall Miller pleaded guilty to involuntary manslaughter and criminal trespass and was sentenced to two years in prison.

During the 2015 shooting of the movie Resident Evil: The Final Chapter, stuntwoman Olivia Jackson had her arm amputated after her motorbike crashed into a metal camera arm during a high-speed chase.

Matilda Rapaport died from an avalanche while filming an advertisement for the 2016 video game Steep.

In 2021 cinematographer Halyna Hutchins was fatally shot on the set of the film Rust when a live bullet was fired from a revolver that actor Alec Baldwin was using as a prop. Director Joel Souza was also injured in the accident.

== See also ==
- Forensic engineering
- Health and Safety Executive
- National Safety Council
- Occupational injury
- Occupational disease
- Occupational health psychology
- Personal injury
- Social security
- Workers' compensation
- Workers' Memorial Day
