= 1080 (disambiguation) =

1080 was a leap year of the Julian calendar.

1080 may also refer to:

== Science and technology ==
- 1080 AM, an AM radio frequency
- 1080i, a video mode with 1080 lines of vertical resolution interlaced
- 1080p, a video mode with 1080 lines of vertical resolution with progressive scan
- GeForce GTX 1080, a graphics processing unit designed by Nvidia
- Sodium fluoroacetate, a chemical compound known in pesticide form as '1080'

== Other uses ==
- Euro1080, a European television broadcaster
- 1080 (skateboarding), a skateboarding trick
- 1080° Avalanche, a game for the Nintendo GameCube
- 1080° Snowboarding, a game for the Nintendo 64
- 1080 Dry Cider, a variety of Strongbow cider
- 1080 6iX Perth, a Perth radio station
