= Rippin' Riders Snowboarding =

1999 video game

- Developer: UEP Systems
- Publishers: JP: UEP Systems; WW: Sega
- Series: Cool Boarders
- Platform: Dreamcast
- Release: JP: August 26, 1999; NA: November 10, 1999; EU: November 12, 1999
- Genre: Sports (snowboarding)
- Modes: Single-player, multiplayer

Rippin' Riders Snowboarding, also known as Cool Boarders Burrrn (クールボーダーズ・バーン) in Japan and Snow Surfers in Europe, is a snowboard game developed by UEP Systems, the creators of the Cool Boarders series. It was released in 1999 for the Dreamcast.

== Gameplay ==
Rippin' Riders Snowboarding is a snowboarding game in which players select from a roster of riders with different abilities and compete to complete courses while performing tricks. The game features Free Ride and Super Pipe modes. In Free Ride, players descend courses containing breakable obstacles, alternative routes and designated trick areas, attempting to achieve high scores through a combination of speed and tricks. The Super Pipe mode features background music changes dynamically according to the tricks performed and the player's performance. Performing tricks can also increase the time available at checkpoints. Super Pipe focuses on performing combinations of aerial tricks to accumulate points.

The game features five initially available downhill courses, with additional courses and characters unlocked through progression. A two-player split-screen mode, Match Race, offers Free Race and Battle variants, allowing players to compete through racing and performing tricks. One multiplayer variant, Line Versus, adjusts the dividing line between the two players' screens according to their performance, increasing the visible playing area of the player who successfully performs tricks while reducing their opponent's. Another multiplayer variant, Trick Boost, allows players to accumulate boost points by performing tricks in designated areas, which can then be used to temporarily increase their speed.

== Development and release ==
The game was developed by UEP Systems under the working title Cool Boarders DC. Following approximately six months without substantial announcements, it was showcased at the spring 1999 Tokyo Game Show, with Japanese magazine Dreamcast Magazine highlighting its improved visual presentation, snowboarding tricks and interactive obstacles.

In June 1999, Dreamcast Magazine interviewed character designer Masaki Shimizu and game planner Yasutaka Ougou about the snowboarders' designs and personalities. Shimizu discussed musical influences on the characters, including a female snowboarder inspired by techno music. The magazine also organised a competition inviting readers to submit character names and background details, with successful entrants promised recognition in the game's credits.

The game's sound team designed an interactive music system in which the background music responds to the player's performance, particularly in Super Pipe mode. Performing successful tricks and combinations causes the soundtrack to become more elaborate, while mistakes interrupt its progression. In an August 1999 interview with Dreamcast Magazine, the developers explained that they had initially considered incorporating rhythm-game mechanics requiring players to press buttons in time with the music, but abandoned the idea to avoid detracting from the snowboarding gameplay.

In July 1999, the game's Japanese title was officially confirmed as Cool Boarders Burrrn!, with a release scheduled for 26 August at a price of ¥5,800.

The Japanese release also incorporated Dream Passport functionality, allowing players to access the game's website through the Dreamcast's internet connection. Additional downloadable snowboard designs were announced as a planned feature.

== Regional differences ==
Rippin' Riders was originally released in Japan under the name Cool Boarders Burrrn. For the US release, UEP opted to release the Cool Boarders sequel under the name Rippin' Riders Snowboarding. This was due to the U.S. rights to the Cool Boarders name being owned by Sony Computer Entertainment whose 989 Studios (a now defunct division of Sony Computer Entertainment America) published the US releases of Cool Boarders 3 and Cool Boarders 4 for the PlayStation.

== Reception ==
Reception

Aggregate score
Aggregator	Score
GameRankings	70%

Review scores
Publication	Score
AllGame	3/5
Edge	5/10
Electronic Gaming Monthly	6.25/10 (Note: Four critics of Electronic Gaming Monthly gave the game each a score of 7/10, 6.5/10, 5.5/10, and 6/10.)
EP Daily	6/10
Famitsu	30/40
Game Informer	7/10
GameFan	64%
GameRevolution	C
GameSpot	6.5/10
GameSpy	7/10
IGN	7.3/10
Next Generation	3/5

The game received "average" reviews according to the review aggregation website GameRankings. Adam Pavlacka of NextGen said that the game was "just Cool Boarders on Dreamcast, albeit with a few new tracks and an excellent graphics upgrade. While enjoyable, it's still decidedly average." In Japan, Famitsu gave it a score of 30 out of 40.

Four-Eyed Dragon of GamePro said in one review, "Despite the glitches, Rippin' Riders is a game fans of the sport can enjoy." (Note: GamePro gave the game 5/5 for graphics, two 4/5 scores for sound and fun factor, and 3.5/5 for control in one review.) In another GamePro review, Scary Larry said, "A lot of people who played Tony Hawk will find the controls unbearably laborious in Rippin' Riders. But that's not to say that extreme sports fans shouldn't take a look at RR for the Dreamcast. It plays harder than TrickStyle, and is more fun than 1080 - provided you get the controls down right. Otherwise, this game could be a weekend slope rental." (Note: GamePro gave the game 5/5 for graphics, two 3/5 scores for sound and control, and 4/5 for fun factor in another review.)

European reviews were mixed. In the United Kingdom, Computer and Video Games awarded Snow Surfers two out of five stars, questioning its lasting appeal. French magazine Consoles + was considerably more positive, awarding the game 90% and praising its colourful graphics, fluid animation and varied courses, although it noted the limited selection of game modes and some missing features from earlier Cool Boarders titles. German magazine MAN!AC gave the game 80%, highlighting its snowboarding action and spectacular stunts. Spain's Revista Oficial Dreamcast awarded it 7 out of 10, praising its sense of speed and varied environments while noting the difficulty of mastering its trick system.

In November 1999, German magazine Sega Magazin featured a multiplayer session of Cool Boarders Burrrn! between rapper Thomas D and television presenter Nilz Bokelberg.

According to NPD sales figures reproduced by Blast Processing!, Rippin' Riders Snowboarding had sold 153,650 copies in North America by March 2003.
