= Peter Line =

Peter Line may refer to:

- Peter Line (snowboarder) (born 1974), American professional snowboarder, writer, photographer, and designer
- Peter Line (bowls) (1930–2025), English international lawn and indoor bowler
