= Rising Zan: The Samurai Gunman =

1999 video game

- Developer: UEP Systems
- Publishers: JP: UEP Systems; WW: Agetec
- Director: Makoto Sunaga
- Producer: Kimiaki Kurashima
- Designer: Tadayuki Konno
- Programmer: Kiyoshi Tsukada
- Artist: Masaki Shimizu
- Composers: Atsunori Namba; Yoshichika Shimamura
- Platform: PlayStation
- Release: JP: March 25, 1999; NA: October 6, 1999; UK: October 1999
- Genre: Action-adventure
- Mode: Single-player

Rising Zan: The Samurai Gunman (Note: Japanese: ライジング ザン ザ・サムライガンマン, Hepburn: Raijingu Zan Za Samurai Ganman) is a 1999 action-adventure game developed by UEP Systems and published by Agetec for the PlayStation. Notable for being the only game developed by UEP Systems to not be a snowboarding game, Rising Zan follows an idiosyncratic world between a mix of the eastern and western, where a young cowboy named Johnny, after almost losing his life to a mysterious assassin, is trained in the way of the samurai by his late father's friend, and returns home under the new name of Zan to defeat the evil samurais who threaten the wild west.

Rising Zan received mixed-to-positive reviews upon release, with critics praising the premise as unique and absurd, as well as finding enjoyment in the game's humor and soundtrack, with criticism primarily being aimed at the gameplay and controls.

== Gameplay ==
Protagonist Zan fights using a revolver named "Johnny No More" (also the title of the game's theme song) in his left hand and a katana named "Demon Slayer" in his right.

The player can rescue hostages scattered around the level, perform several combos combining sword and gun attacks and make "All Button Events" in which all buttons in the controller must be pressed quickly to fill a bar in a limited time. These include one of seven finishing moves for the enemy boss character at the end of each level (there are nine in all); these moves themselves are ranked, from lowest to highest - "Weak", "Yeah", "Neat", "Cool", "Groovy", "Wicked", and "Bitchin'". Zan also has a bar that raises several levels which allows him to execute "Hustle Mode," in which his sword grows to a much longer length, his attack power increases, and his speed shoots up considerably allowing him to run and attack at extremely high speeds.

These actions, when completed successfully, reward extra score to the player, which is summed at the end of each level and evaluates the player's performance by giving them a ranking. This varies in rank from lowest to highest: "Chicken", "Hero", "Sexy Hero", "Ultra Sexy Hero", and "Super Ultra Sexy Hero". If the player completes the game with a high ranking, several extra features can be unlocked. Said features include being able to play the game as Sapphire, Zan's Japanese stepsister.

== Plot ==
During the pioneering days of America's Wild west period, a young man named Johnny recently becomes the newly appointed sheriff of Tsuka Town, where one of his first tasks is to explore an abanonded gold mine where many people have recently been reported kidnapped. While finding no one there, Johnny is suddenly ambushed and attacked by a mysterious samurai with a mask, who cuts an X-shaped scar into his face. However, Johnny is saved at the last minute by Suzuki, a samurai master and a friend to Johnny's late father. Owing him his life, Johnny wishes to seek revenge against the samurai, which Suzuki agrees to, on the condition that he and Johnny travel to his home country of Zipang where Johnny is to train until he was ready to go back.

Now fully trained in the art of the samurai, Johnny now declares himself as the Super Ultra Sexy Hero, Zan, and mixes that with his gunslinging knowledge as he finally returns home. However, he finds that his hometown has now been overrun with ninjas and men made of wood., revealed to be the work of the Jackal, an organization of samurai and ninja who have begun to loot the wild west of their resources for their own schemes. Realizing the danger his home is in, Johnny takes up both his blade and gun as he begins to uncover the Jackal's main plan, as well as do battle with Loki, the same samurai that almost killed him years ago.

== Development ==
Rising Zan had been in development as early as April 1998 after the European release of Cool Boarders 2. Due to the unique nature of the game, Rising Zan was inspired by several TV shows, one of which being Super Sentai, which was the inspiration for the game's enemies as well as their speaking mannerisms.

The game was also unique in that it had its own opening theme song with complete, sung lyrics, in both the American and Japanese versions of the game, which also plays at the end of every stage. The Japanese opening song, Samurai Gunman Zan the Zan (サムライガンマン 斬ザ・ザーン, Samurai Ganman Zan Za Zaan), was sung by Hironobu Kageyama and composed by Atsunori Namba and arranged by Yohgo Kohno, and is more based on theme songs seen in anime. The song would also go on to release as a single in Japan under the same name, alongside a karaoke version. The American opening song, Johnny No More, instead goes for a vibe of a Western TV show from the 1950s and 1960s. This version was composed and sung by David Nowlin and Greg Weber (Zan's voice actor), and appears on the Rising Zan: The Samurai Gunman Original Soundtrack alongside its Japanese version, where it is listed as the Overseas Theme Song.

== Reception ==
Reception

Aggregate score
Aggregator	Score
GameRankings	69%

Review scores
Publication	Score
AllGame	3/5
Electronic Gaming Monthly	7.375/10
Famitsu	29/40
Game Informer	8/10
GameFan	85% (G.N.) 84%
GameSpot	6.5/10
IGN	8.5/10
Next Generation	2/5
PlayStation Official Magazine – UK	5/10
Official U.S. PlayStation Magazine	4/5
PlayStation: The Official Magazine	3.5/5

Rising Zan received "average" reviews according to GameRankings, with moderate praise for its original premise and quirky humor tempered greatly with rampant criticism of the game's many technical shortcomings and unpolished execution. Jeff Lundrigan of NextGen said of the game, "You want to like it, but it's just not as fun as it ought to be." In Japan, Famitsu gave it a score of 29 out of 40.

In 2009, GamesRadar+ included it among the games "with untapped franchise potential", commenting: "Rising Zan may not have been the best PS1 game ever, or even among the best, but it has the words 'Samurai Gunman' in its name, and that’s more than enough to warrant a sequel."

Official UK PlayStation Magazine stated that the game had "an excellent plot and occasional flashes of brilliance" but that it was "nothing special".

== See also ==
- Red Steel 2
- Samurai Western
