= Zap! Snowboarding Trix =

1997 video game

- Developer: Atelier Double
- Publisher: Pony Canyon
- Platform: Saturn
- Release: JP: February 21, 1997
- Genre: Snowboarding video game
- Mode: Single player

Zap! Snowboarding Trix (Note: Zap! Snowboarding Trix (ザップ！ スノーボーディング トリック, Zappu! Sunōbōdingu Torikku)) is a snowboarding video game developed by Atelier Double and published by Pony Canyon. It was released only for the Sega Saturn, and only in Japan. A sequel to the game, called Zap! Snowboarding Trix '98, was later released both for Saturn and PlayStation (the latter console version internationally) in 1997–1999, under the title Freestyle Boardin' '99 in North America and Phat Air: Extreme Snowboarding in Europe.

== Reception ==
Reception

Review scores
Publication	Score
Famitsu	28/40
Next Generation	3/5

The game received average reviews. Next Generation said, "With only three competitive courses and one freestyle course, there may not be enough to keep the master gamer involved. However, compared to its competition, Cool Boarders, Trix breezes by as a faster, more exciting experience." In Japan, Famitsu gave it a score of 28 out of 40.

== See also ==
- List of Sega Saturn games
- List of snowboarding video games
