= Cool Boarders: Code Alien =

2000 video game

- Developer: UEP Systems
- Publisher: UEP Systems
- Series: Cool Boarders
- Platform: PlayStation 2
- Release: JP: December 21, 2000
- Genre: Sports (snowboarding)
- Modes: Single-player, multiplayer

Cool Boarders: Code Alien is a 2000 snowboarding video game developed and published by UEP Systems exclusively for the PlayStation 2. It is the only Cool Boarders title to be released exclusively in Japan.

== Gameplay ==
Cool Boarders: Code Alien contains five play modes including extreme, trick, trick master, license mode, and a mixed mode called snowboarding combined. In the extreme, trick, and trick master modes, players earn points either by performing tricks off of obstacles or by linking tricks together to create combinations. The trick master mode serves acts as a tutorial in which players are sent down an endlessly repeating ski slope while being prompted to perform increasingly difficult tricks. License mode requires players to navigate a series of obstacles in order to obtain a series of licenses. The snowboarding combined mode combines the game's downhill racing and trick tournament elements. Both the extreme and trick modes can be played with multiple players.

Players control their snowboarder by tapping or holding the X button to jump or charge, holding the D-pad in one direction to set up a trick, and utilizing the PlayStation controllers' analog functions by exerting light or hard pressure on the buttons, consequently yielding different tricks. Onscreen messages alert the player as to the degree of the spin or flip they are setting up.

The game features Yagi "The Goat" (the starter character with the best technique), Jin (the fastest starter character), Irin (the starter character with the best responsiveness/quickness), and Cindy (the all-around character): all of whom appeared in Cool Boarders 2; furthermore, board choices from Volcom, Arnette, and Burton exist.

== Reception ==
GameSpot wrote in a January 2001 review of the game that its production was "top-notch", citing that the game possessed quirky characters and a comic sensibility.

This game was well-liked by Cool Boarders 2 cult fans because it is very similar, but the gameplay is more fluid, and the graphics are greatly improved. Similar to Cool Boarders 2, it is possible to do a wide variety of tricks, there are huge jumps, and there are a lot of wildly entertaining game modes. Cool Boarders: Code Alien has a noticeable improvement to the camera work, the terrain and obstacle variety, and the realism. Also, it is much easier to land tricks because there is added air control. There are fewer forced hazards, although there are still too many in this title, so the player can also enjoy playing the game with fewer in-play interruptions.
