= Cool Boarders =

1996 video game

- North American cover art
- Developer: UEP Systems
- Publishers: JP: UEP Systems; WW: Sony Computer Entertainment
- Directors: Kimiaki Kurashima; Masaya Kobayashi
- Producers: Shin Umezawa; Mitsuru Kamada
- Designers: Yasuhito Sakaue; Tadayuki Konno
- Programmers: Kiyoshi Tsukada; Ikumi Takemoto
- Series: Cool Boarders
- Platform: PlayStation
- Release: JP: August 30, 1996; NA: January 15, 1997; EU: January 1997
- Genre: Snowboarding
- Mode: Single-player

Cool Boarders (Note: Japanese: クールボーダーズ, Hepburn: Kūru Bōdāzu) is a snowboarding video game developed by UEP Systems for the PlayStation. It was released in Japan by UEP Systems in August 1996 and internationally by Sony Computer Entertainment in January 1997.

The game was released for the PlayStation Network as a PS one Classic in North America on December 4, 2006, in Europe on November 8, 2007, and in Japan on October 26, 2011. It was released for PlayStation 4 and PlayStation 5 on March 19, 2024. Hamster Corporation re-released the game as part of their Console Archives for the Nintendo Switch 2 and PlayStation 5 in February 2026. Several sequels were also released.

== Gameplay ==
The game consists of three main courses (plus two additional unlockables) in which the player attempts to gain the fastest time, most points from performing tricks, and also total points, a combination of the two previous disciplines. This early game, while simple, led the way for the development of much more popular, extreme sport games.

== Release ==
Cool Boarders was first released in Japan in August 1996. At this time, Sony Computer Entertainment officials stated that, though snowboarding was not yet as popular in the West as in Japan, they were "seriously considering" localizing the game to North America.

== Reception ==
Reception

Aggregate score
Aggregator	Score
GameRankings	74% (6 reviews)

Review scores
Publication	Score
Computer and Video Games	3/5
Edge	6/10
Electronic Gaming Monthly	7/10
GamePro	4/5
GameRevolution	B+
GameSpot	7.4/10
Hyper	78%
IGN	7/10
Next Generation	3/5
Dengeki PlayStation	70/100, 55/100

Reviews for Cool Boarders were mixed. The game received an average score of 74% at GameRankings, based on an aggregate of 6 reviews. Critics praised the selection of boards which offer differing gameplay and the thrills in the experience, but criticized the lack of a two-player mode or AI competitors to race against and the bizarre physics, such as how the player character tends to get caught between closely placed barriers, ricocheting back and forth between them, and how hitting certain objects can make them slide uphill. Kraig Kujawa and Dean Hager of Electronic Gaming Monthly found that the game, while reasonably fun overall, could only be recommended to fans of snowboarding and other "extreme" sports. GamePro commented: "The controls allow for tight handling and make performing tricks a breeze. Although the graphics show minor breakup, they're still well animated in the popular polygonal style". Next Generation summarized: "Surprisingly, the first dedicated snowboarding game for PlayStation is a great deal of fun to play and offers a challenge like nothing else on the system. However, too many goofy flaws keep it from being a total success". GameSpot found the physics and limited ability to go off-course frustrating, and like Next Generation expressed hope that a sequel would fix the problems that kept the game from being great.

== Legacy ==
Cool Boarders was followed up by numerous sequels. After Cool Boarders 2, Idol Minds developed Cool Boarders 3, Cool Boarders 4 and Cool Boarders 2001 under license from UEP Systems. An arcade installment, Cool Boarders Arcade Jam, was released by Tecmo in 1998. Due to Sony owning the trademark for Cool Boarders, a Dreamcast spin-off was released by Sega under the title Rippin' Riders Snowboarding in 1999. A spin-off for the Neo Geo Pocket Color, Cool Boarders Pocket, was released by SNK in 1999. After developing Cool Boarders: Code Alien for the PlayStation 2, UEP Systems shut down in 2001.
