= Peter Line (snowboarder) =

American snowboarder (born 1974)

Personal information
- Born: August 3, 1974 (age 51) Media, Pennsylvania, U.S.
- Occupation(s): Professional snowboarder, photographer, graphic designer, apparel designer
- Height: 5 ft 6 in (1.68 m)
- Website: PeterLineDesign.com
Medal record
Men's snowboarding
Representing United States
Summer X Games
Gold medal – first place	1997 San Diego	Big air
Gold medal – first place	1999 San Francisco	Big air
Winter X Games
Silver medal – second place	1999 Crested Butte	Big air
Gold medal – first place	1999 Crested Butte	Slope style
Gold medal – first place	2000 Mount Snow	Big Air
Bronze medal – third place	2000 Mount Snow	Slope style

Peter Line (born August 3, 1974) is an American professional snowboarder, snowboard industry entrepreneur, writer, photographer and designer. Line is regarded as one of the greatest influences in the history of snowboarding based on his broad contributions as a professional rider, industry entrepreneur, designer, and media contributor. Line is a six-time X Game medalist, one of few to gold medal in the Summer and Winter X Games, as well as a two-time US Open medalist and a World Snowboarding Championships gold medalist.

Snowboarder magazine ranked Line as number four of the 20 most influential snowboarders. ESPN ranked him the tenth best X Games Snowboarder of all time and he is one of only a few to receive the Transworld Snowboarding Legend Award for his legacy and on-going contributions to the culture of snowboarding. Line is attributed with introducing several milestone innovations to freestyle snowboarding including the first corked spin, the first backside rodeo as well as his influence on how snowboarding brands assemble and market their professional teams.

In addition to his professional snowboarding accomplishments, Line is an entrepreneur who co-founded Foursquare Outerwear, Forum Snowboards and Jeenyus Snowboards. He continues to work as a photographer, graphic designer and apparel designer where his work for Dakine and Filson has received numerous accolades.

== Early life ==
Line was born in Media, Pennsylvania to parents Norma and Dick. In 1984 his family moved to Bellevue, Washington from Miami, Florida where he'd lived since the age of two. It was in Bellevue that Line first started skateboarding at the age of 12 which led him to start snowboarding at the age of 13. At 17, Line competed in the US Amateur Nationals winning third place which led to him getting his first amateur sponsorships. The following summer, he worked at the Ride Snowboard camp in Whistler, Canada as a digger. During the camp, Division 23 snowboards hosted a photoshoot for their professional team. Line was invited to participate in the shoot and his performance led Division 23 to promote him to their professional team.

== Professional snowboarding career ==
Line became a professional snowboarder in 1993 after signing with Division 23 snowboards. The same year, Line starred in major snowboarding movies from Mack Dawg Productions, Standard Films and Transworld Snowboarding the latter which Line is credited with landing the first corked spin, a milestone moment that would go on to influence the future of freestyle snowboarding. By 1995, Line had established himself as one of the biggest names in freestyle snowboarding based on his success as a film professional with a series of influential video parts.

In the mid-1990s, Big Air, and later Slopestyle, became increasingly standard snowboarding competition formats. The advent of these new freestyle focused formats allowed Line to expand upon his success and growing influence as a film professional through participation in high-profile national and international competitions which were increasingly televised to a global audience.

Line's first major competition win was the US Open Big Air in 1996. The same year, Division 23 released Line's iconic, first signature-model snowboard. In 1997, Line won silver at the US Open Big Air, gold in the very first X Games Snowboard Big Air and gold at the inaugural MTV Sports & Music Festival. Later that year, Mack Dawg Productions released Simple Pleasures. Line's headlining part of the movie included the first backside rodeo flip another milestone that would go on to influence the future of freestyle snowboarding.

Between 1998 and 2000, Line would go on to win five more X Games medals, two golds and one silver in Big Air and a gold and a bronze in Slopestyle.

Line retired from professional snowboarding in 2001 to focus on his business interests and creative pursuits. He returned in 2009 to star in the Forum team movie, Forum or Against ‘Em which earned him the recognition of Comeback of the Year from Snowboarder Magazine.

In 2015, Capita Snowboards announced the release of the Peter Line Rainbow 153 snowboard, “In honor of one of the most famous snowboarders-and snowboard graphics-of all time,”

=== Sponsorships ===
During his professional career, Line's sponsorships included: Division 23, Dragon, Electric Visual, Etnies, Forum, Foursquare, Smith, ThirtyTwo and Vestal Watches.

== Snowboard business career ==
In 1996 Line was in search of a new outwear sponsor and Greg Dileo, the president of Division 23 introduced him to Raul Ries, owner of the outerwear brand Special Blend and its distributor Four Star. Line and Ries discussed what they saw was a gap in snowboarding, outerwear that brings together technical functionality with cutting edge style. This conversation led to Line co-founding Foursquare outerwear with Ries’ Four Star Distribution and Ingemar Backman. Line played a central role in the marketing and influence of Foursquare as a key member of their team of riders as well as serving as co-creative director of the brand and co-lead designer of many of Foursquare's early outerwear and accessories. Foursquare went on to become one of the most recognizable and influential snowboarding brands of its era.

Later in 1996, using the same template as Foursquare, Line co-founded Forum snowboards with Four Star Distribution and film director, Mike McEntire of Mack Dawg Productions. Like Foursquare, Line played a central role in the marketing and influence of Forum as the founding member of their team of riders as well as serving as co-creative director of the brand and co-lead designer of their snowboards.

Line was instrumental in the development and recruiting of Forum's professional team of riders which would be branded and marketed as the Forum 8. The Forum 8 is widely regarded as the most talented and influential group of riders of its era.

In 2001, Line co-founded his second snowboard brand, Jeenyus, with Four Star Distribution and Kevin Jones.

In July 2004, Burton Snowboards announced their intent to acquire the Forum, Special Blend, Jeenyus and Foursquare brands from Four Star Distribution, the deal would be finalized a month later. Burton founder, Jake Burton would say of the acquisition, "Forum is a company we have always respected, and it is a brand that needed to stay in the hands of snowboarders. We will do our best to see that Forum and its sister brands continue to grow and develop".

Post-acquisition Line remained involved in the creative direction and apparel design of Foursquare until 2013.

In 2012, Burton announced a restructuring which included closing Forum, Special Blend and Four Square in 2014 . Burton's announcement prompted the grass roots social media campaign #giveFORUMtoPeter which included an online petition to give Forum back to Line.

== Graphic design and photography ==
Line's photography has been featured in ad campaigns for Ride Snowboards' Cappel Outerwear and published in editorial features in Pleasure Magazine, Snowboarder Magazine, Desillusion, and Unbound.

Line has served as a creative director for Foursquare Outerwear, Forum Snowboards and Jeenyus Snowboards. He has designed products including snowboards, apparel, bags, shoes, and goggles for brands including Division 23, Foursquare, Forum, Jeenyus, Capita, Dakine, DVS Shoe and Electric Visuals.

Line has done brand and marketing design for Foursquare, Forum, Jeenyus, Cappel, UFC and Red Bull.

== Apparel design ==
Line credits “the school of snowboarding” and a responsibility and commitment to quality as inspirations for his first apparel design efforts with Foursquare Outerwear in 1996. “I’ve lived this entire industry and I know when something needs to be designed a certain way to work on the hill. That’s innate to me,” Line told Snowboarder Magazine. Line contributed design and direction to Foursquare Outerwear until 2013.

In 2012, Line designed an exclusive collection of soft goods for Forum named “The Peter Line.”

Line designed the Filson 3-Layer Field Jacket which was recognized as the Best Upland Hunting Jacket of 2021. BlessThisStuff called the jacket, “quite possibly the most capable field jacket on the market. There is nothing more waterproof, snow proof or wind proof out there” GearMoose named it one of The Top 20 Field Jackets.

Between 2013 and 2020 Line served as the lead men's outerwear designer for Dakine where he was responsible for developing an annual line of jackets, pants base layer and mid layer. Field Mag reviewed Dakine's outerwear calling it, “surprisingly impressive, which we’ll chock up to Line’s involvement” During seven seasons of outerwear design at Dakine, Line was often credited with boosting the brands relevance and product quality within the men's outerwear market. His designs received several recognitions and awards including Best Ski Jacket by Snow Magazine, the Powder Magazine Skiers Choice Award, Editor's Choice by Freeskier and Best Bib Pants from Whitelines.

== Non-competition awards and accolades ==
- Transworld Snowboarding Rider’s Poll – Freestyle Rider of the Year (1999)
- Transworld Snowboarding Rider’s Poll – Video Segment of the Year (1999)
- ESPN Action Sports and Music Award, nominee (2000)
- Transworld Snowboarding Rider’s Poll – Rock Star of the Year (2001)
- Transworld Snowboarding Rider’s Poll – SIA Retailers Choice (2001)
- Rider of the Year - SNOWBOARDER Magazine (2001)
- Transworld Snowboarding Legend Award (2013)
- Snowboarder Magazine Greatest Riders of All Time (2017)
- The Top 20 X Games Snowboarders of All-Time-10. Peter Line
- 25 Best Snowboarders All Time 2 (Skateboards HQ)

== Television appearances ==
Line made a cameo appearance as himself in the 2011 episode "Spread the Shred” of the TV series The Adventures of Danny & Dingo. Line also starred as an unnamed snowboarder in a broadcast advertising campaign for Mountain Dew.

== Videography ==
- Transworld Snowboarding Video Magazine Vol 1, Transworld Snowboarding (1993)
- TB 3 Coming Down the Mountain, Standard Films (1993)
- Upping The Ante, Mack Dawg Productions (1993)
- TB 4 Run to the Hills, Standard Films (1994)
- The Meltdown Project, Mack Dawg Productions (1995)
- Stomping Grounds, Mack Dawg Productions (1996)
- Simple Pleasures, Mack Dawg Productions (1997)
- Decade, Mack Dawg Productions (1998)
- Technical Difficulties, Mack Dawg Productions (1999)
- The Resistance, Mack Dawg Productions (2000)
- True Life, Mack Dawg Productions (2001)
- Pulse, Mack Dawg Productions (2002)
- That, Forum Snowboards (2006)
- Northsoutheastwest, Foursquare Outerwear (2007)
- Forum or against em, Forum Snowboards (2008)
- Forum Forever, Forum Snowboards (2009)
- Forum, F...it, Forum Snowboards (2010)
- Vacation, Forum snowboards (2011)
- P(eter) Eddie Files (2011)

== Video games ==
- X Games Pro Boarder (1998)
- ESPN Winter X Games Snowboarding (2002)
- Evolution Snowboarding (2002)
- Transworld Snowboarding (2002)
