= Snowboard Kids 2 =

1999 video game

- Developer: Racdym
- Publisher: Atlus
- Directors: Hideki Yayama; Takeshi Murata
- Producer: Hiroyuki Tanaka
- Designers: Shigeru Maekawa; Katsumi Suzuki; Hitomi Fukaumi
- Composers: Tomohiko Sato; Isao Kasai; Sayuri Yamamoto
- Platform: Nintendo 64
- Release: JP: February 19, 1999; NA: March 1, 1999; AU: April 30, 1999
- Genre: Snowboarding
- Modes: Single-player, multiplayer

Snowboard Kids 2 (Note: Known in Japan as 超スノボキッズ (chō sunobo kizzu)) is a snowboarding video game developed by Racjin and published by Atlus. It serves as the sequel to Snowboard Kids and was later followed by another sequel, SBK: Snowboard Kids.

== Gameplay ==
Snowboard Kids 2 retains the core gameplay of its predecessor while introducing modifications to the game mechanics.

The main game is divided into two modes. Story mode combines the battle race and skill game modes from the previous installment. Coins are available on courses except in expert mode. The game also introduces recurring boss stages that appear after a set number of races and includes a hub town that replaces the main menu. Expert mode unlocks upon completing Story mode.

Four new characters are introduced, along with five returning characters from the first game, totaling nine characters. Only the six starter characters are available in Story mode, while all nine characters can be used in Battle mode once the remaining three are unlocked. The five returning characters are extensively redesigned, and each character now has four costumes to match the diverse themes of the races.

The game offers a total of 15 courses, each featuring unique themes such as snow, a tropical island, a castle, a haunted house, and space. Story mode includes nine standard race courses, three skill game courses, and three boss stages; these are modified versions of the standard race courses with variations in time of day, weather, and occasionally, course hazards. The boss stages are available as normal race courses in Battle mode. All courses have three laps, which can be adjusted in Battle mode.

The game includes powerups, known as weapons, that players can use against competing racers. Players can perform multiple tricks while airborne, which can be used to block weapon attacks, along with executing a board grab.

== Reception ==
Reception

Review scores
| Publication | Score |
|---|---|
| AllGame | 3.5/5 |
| Electronic Gaming Monthly | 7.5/10 (Note: In Electronic Gaming Monthly's review, two critics scored Snowboard Kids 2 7.5/10, one 7/10, another 8/10.) |
| GameFan | 87.3/100 (Note: In GameFan's review, three critics scored Snowboard Kids 2 differently: 84, 85, and 93.) |
| GameSpot | 7/10 |
| Hyper | 60/100 |
| IGN | 6/10 |
| N64 Magazine | 80% |
| Nintendo Power | 7.3/10 |

Time Extension included the game in its "Best Nintendo 64 Games of All Time" list.
