= ESPN Winter X-Games Snowboarding 2002 =

2001 video game

- North American PlayStation 2 box art
- Developer: Konami Computer Entertainment Osaka
- Publisher: Konami
- Platforms: PlayStation 2, Game Boy Advance, Xbox
- Release: JP: November 29, 2001 (PS2); JP: December 20, 2001 (GBA); NA: January 17, 2002; EU: March 8, 2002 (GBA); EU: March 15, 2002 (PS2); Xbox: JP: February 22, 2002; NA: March 6, 2002; EU: June 7, 2002
- Genre: Snowboarding
- Modes: Single-player, multiplayer

ESPN Winter X-Games Snowboarding 2002 (ESPN ウィンターエックスゲームズ スノーボーディング 2002, ESPN Wintā Ekkusu Gēmuzu Sunōbōdingu 2002), known in Europe as ESPN Winter Games Snowboarding 2, is a video game developed and published by Konami for PlayStation 2, Game Boy Advance, and Xbox in 2001-2002. It is a sequel to ESPN Winter X-Games Snowboarding released in 2000.

== Reception ==
Reception

Aggregate score
Aggregator	Score		
Aggregator	GBA	PS2	Xbox
Metacritic	N/A	64/100	71/100

Review scores
Publication	Score		
Publication	GBA	PS2	Xbox
AllGame	1.5/5	N/A	N/A
Electronic Gaming Monthly	N/A	6/10	N/A
Famitsu	19/40	30/40	32/40
Game Informer	N/A	7/10	6.75/10
GamePro	N/A	2.5/5	N/A
GameSpot	N/A	6.4/10	6.5/10
GameSpy	N/A	N/A	83%
GameZone	N/A	7.3/10	N/A
IGN	N/A	7.2/10	N/A
Official U.S. PlayStation Magazine	N/A	3/5	N/A
Official Xbox Magazine (US)	N/A	N/A	7.9/10

The PlayStation 2 and Xbox versions received "mixed or average reviews" according to the review aggregation website Metacritic. In Japan, Famitsu gave it a score of 32 out of 40 for the latter version, 30 out of 40 for the former version, and 19 out of 40 for the Game Boy Advance version.

== See also ==
- ESPN X Games Skateboarding
- ESPN International Winter Sports 2002
- List of snowboarding video games
