= Snowboarding (video game) =

2000 video game

- Developer: Atelier Double
- Publishers: JP: D3 Publisher; NA: A1 Games; EU: Midas Interactive Entertainment
- Platform: PlayStation
- Release: JP: February 24, 2000; NA: December 20, 2000; EU: May 2, 2003
- Genre: Snowboarding
- Modes: Single-player, multiplayer

Snowboarding, known in Japan as Simple 1500 Series Vol. 27: The SnowBoard (SIMPLE 1500 シリーズ Vol.27 THE スノーボード, Shinpuru 1500 Shirīzu Vol. 27 Za SunōBōdo) (part of the Simple 1500 series), and in Europe as Snowboard Racer, is a snowboarding video game developed by Atelier Double and published by D3 Publisher for the PlayStation in 2000. It was localised and released in North America by Agetec under its A1 Games publishing label, and in Europe by Midas Interactive Entertainment.

== Reception ==
Reception

Review scores
Publication	Score
AllGame	1.5/5
Electronic Gaming Monthly	2/10
Famitsu	25/40
Official U.S. PlayStation Magazine	2/5
PSX Nation	56%

The game received unfavorable reviews. In Japan, Famitsu gave it a score of 25 out of 40.

== See also ==
- List of PlayStation games (M–Z)
- List of snowboarding video games
