= ESPN Winter X-Games Snowboarding =

2000 video game

- North American cover art
- Developer: Konami
- Publisher: Konami
- Platform: PlayStation 2
- Release: NA: October 26, 2000; JP: November 30, 2000; EU: January 26, 2001
- Genre: Snowboarding
- Modes: Single-player, multiplayer

ESPN Winter X-Games Snowboarding (ESPN ウィンターエックスゲームズ スノーボーディング, ESPN Wintā Ekkusu Gēmuzu Sunōbōdingu) is a video game developed and published by Konami for PlayStation 2 in 2000–2001. A sequel, ESPN Winter X-Games Snowboarding 2002, was released in 2001.

== Reception ==
Reception

Aggregate score
Aggregator	Score
Metacritic	73/100

Review scores
Publication	Score
CNET Gamecenter	7/10
Electronic Gaming Monthly	7.33/10
Game Informer	8.25/10
GameFan	69%
GamePro	4.5/5
GameRevolution	C+
GameSpot	6.4/10
GameSpy	79%
IGN	8/10
Official U.S. PlayStation Magazine	3/5

The game received "average" reviews according to the review aggregation website Metacritic.

== See also ==
- ESPN X Games Skateboarding
- ESPN International Winter Sports 2002
- List of snowboarding video games
