= Cool Boarders 4 =

1999 video game

- Developer: Idol Minds
- Publishers: NA: 989 Studios; EU: Sony Computer Entertainment; JP: UEP Systems
- Director: Kelly Ryan
- Producer: Chris Cutliff
- Programmers: Mark Lyons; Alex MacPhee; Jim Mooney; Lee Saito
- Composers: Chuck Carr; Matt Furniss
- Series: Cool Boarders
- Platform: PlayStation
- Release: NA: October 26, 1999; EU: February 25, 2000; JP: March 9, 2000
- Genre: Snowboarding
- Modes: Single-player, multiplayer

Cool Boarders 4 is a 1999 snowboarding video game developed by Idol Minds and published by Sony Computer Entertainment for the PlayStation. 989 Studios released it in North America while UEP Systems, the creator of the Cool Boarders series, released it in Japan.

In the game, the player can play multiple tracks with multiple characters. The campaign includes scenarios such as slalom runs and time attacks. In the game, the feature of multiplayer is also accessible.

== Reception ==
Reception

Aggregate score
Aggregator	Score
GameRankings	68%

Review scores
Publication	Score
AllGame	3.5/5
CNET Gamecenter	7/10
Famitsu	28/40
Game Informer	7.75/10
GameFan	75%
GameSpot	7.3/10
IGN	4/10
Jeuxvideo.com	11/20
Next Generation	2/5
Official U.S. PlayStation Magazine	3/5
The Sydney Morning Herald	3.5/5

The game received average reviews according to the review aggregation website GameRankings. Chris Kramer of NextGen said that the game "still lacks energy, and even Nintendo's three-year old 1080° Snowboarding is a better game." In Japan, where the game was ported and published by UEP Systems on March 9, 2000, Famitsu gave it a score of 28 out of 40.
