= Trick'N Snowboarder =

1999 video game

- Developer: Cave
- Publishers: JP/NA: Capcom; PAL: Virgin Interactive
- Director: Yasuyuki Hirota
- Producers: Kenichi Takano; Tatsuya Minami
- Artists: Naoki Dewa; Mahito Koike; Naruki Kanetaka
- Composers: Akari Kaida; Masami Ueda
- Platform: PlayStation
- Release: JP: February 4, 1999; NA: October 19, 1999; EU: December 29, 2000
- Genre: Snowboarding
- Modes: Single-player, multiplayer

Trick'N Snowboarder, known in Japan as Tricky Sliders (Japanese: トリッキースライダーズ, Hepburn: Torikkī Suraidāzu), is a snowboarding video game published by Capcom in 1999. It is the follow-up to Cave's previous snowboarding game, Steep Slope Sliders. Unlike its predecessor, which was released into arcades, Trick'N Snowboarder is a console exclusive title.

== Scenario Mode ==
Scenario mode takes the player through ten stages with specific goals for completion of each stage, similar to that of other extreme sports games like Tony Hawk's Pro Skater. These goals primarily revolve around the goal of capturing the best tricks and stunts for a series of videos that the player is involved in shooting, though there are three instances where an opponent challenges the player to either a score-based or time-based challenge.

== Gameplay ==
The game sticks to the standard recipe for snowboarding titles: wild downhill courses with jump-off points and occasional obstacles; different modes such as alpine, half-pipe, and single-jump competitions; and marginal extras like replay saves and player/title logo-edit functions. It includes the Resident Evil 2 characters Leon S. Kennedy, Claire Redfield, and a Zombie Cop as playable snowboarders.

== Reception ==
Reception

Aggregate score
Aggregator	Score
GameRankings	57%

Review scores
Publication	Score
AllGame	3.5/5
Consoles +	45%
Electronic Gaming Monthly	4/10
Famitsu	29/40
Game Informer	4.25/10
GameFan	(A.C.) 68% 67%
GamePro	3.5/5
GameSpot	6.2/10
IGN	6.5/10
Official U.S. PlayStation Magazine	1.5/5

Trick'N Snowboarder received "mixed" reviews according to video game review aggregator GameRankings. In Japan, Famitsu gave it a score of 29 out of 40.
