= Transworld Snowboarding (video game) =

2002 video game

- Developer: Housemarque
- Publisher: Infogrames (Note: Released under the Atari brand name)
- Platform: Xbox
- Release: NA: October 15, 2002; EU: November 15, 2002
- Genre: Snowboarding
- Mode: Single-player

Transworld Snowboarding is a snowboarding video game developed by Housemarque and published by Infogrames, released in 2002, for the Xbox. It is a sequel to Supreme Snowboarding.

== Gameplay ==
Transworld Snowboarding is a snowboard freestyle racing game. The game features ten professional snowboarders, including Todd Richards, Andrew Crawford, Tina Basich, Barrett Christy, and Peter Line.

== Development ==
Transworld Snowboarding was developed by Housemarque. The game was originally in development for the Dreamcast under the name of Supreme Snowboarding 2 before being moved to the Xbox and given a complete graphics revamp, and after Infogrames signed a licensing deal with the Transworld Skateboarding magazine. It was first announced at E3 2001, along with Transworld Skateboarding and Transworld Surf.

The game was originally slated for release in the second quarter of 2002; it was released in the United States on October 15, with a European release on November 15 later that year.

== Reception ==
Reception

Aggregate score
Aggregator	Score
Metacritic	74/100

Review scores
Publication	Score
Game Informer	6.5/10
GamePro	4/5
GamesMaster	61%
GameSpot	7.6/10
GameSpy	76%
GameZone	6.8/10
IGN	6.7/10
Official Xbox Magazine (UK)	6.1/10
Official Xbox Magazine (US)	8.3/10
X-Play	3/5

Upon its release, Transworld Snowboarding received "average" reviews according to the review aggregation website Metacritic. It was nominated for "Best Extreme Sports Game" for IGN's Best of E3 2002.
