= Freestyle Boardin' '99 =

1997 video game

- Developer: Atelier Double
- Publishers: JP: Pony Canyon; EU: Funsoft GmbH; NA: Capcom
- Platforms: Sega Saturn, PlayStation
- Release: Saturn: JP: December 18, 1997; PlayStation: JP: December 25, 1997; EU: August 1998; NA: February 23, 1999
- Genre: Snowboarding
- Modes: Single-player, multiplayer

Freestyle Boardin' '99 (Note: known in Japan as Zap! Snowboarding Trix '98 (ザップ！スノーボーディング トリック'98, Zappu! Sunōbōdingu Torikku '98), and in Europe as Phat Air: Extreme Snowboarding) is a snowboarding video game developed by Atelier Double for Sega Saturn and PlayStation in 1997–1999. It is the sequel to Zap! Snowboarding Trix.

== Gameplay ==
Freestyle Boardin' '99 includes a two-player mode using a vertical split screen.

== Reception ==
Reception

Aggregate score
Aggregator	Score	
Aggregator	PS	Saturn
GameRankings	48%	N/A

Review scores
Publication	Score	
Publication	PS	Saturn
Consoles +	N/A	84%
Electronic Gaming Monthly	4/10	N/A
EP Daily	7.5/10	N/A
Famitsu	7/10, 7/10, 8/10, 5/10	25/40
Game Informer	6/10	N/A
GamePro	2.5/5	N/A
GameSpot	6/10	N/A
IGN	1/10	N/A
PlayStation Official Magazine – UK	5/10	N/A
Official U.S. PlayStation Magazine	2.5/5	N/A
PlayStation: The Official Magazine	1.5/5	N/A

The PlayStation version received unfavorable reviews according to the review aggregation website GameRankings. In Japan, Famitsu gave it a score of 27 out of 40 for the same PlayStation version, and 25 out of 40 for the Saturn version.
