= Matilda Rapaport =

Swedish alpine free-skier (1986–2016)

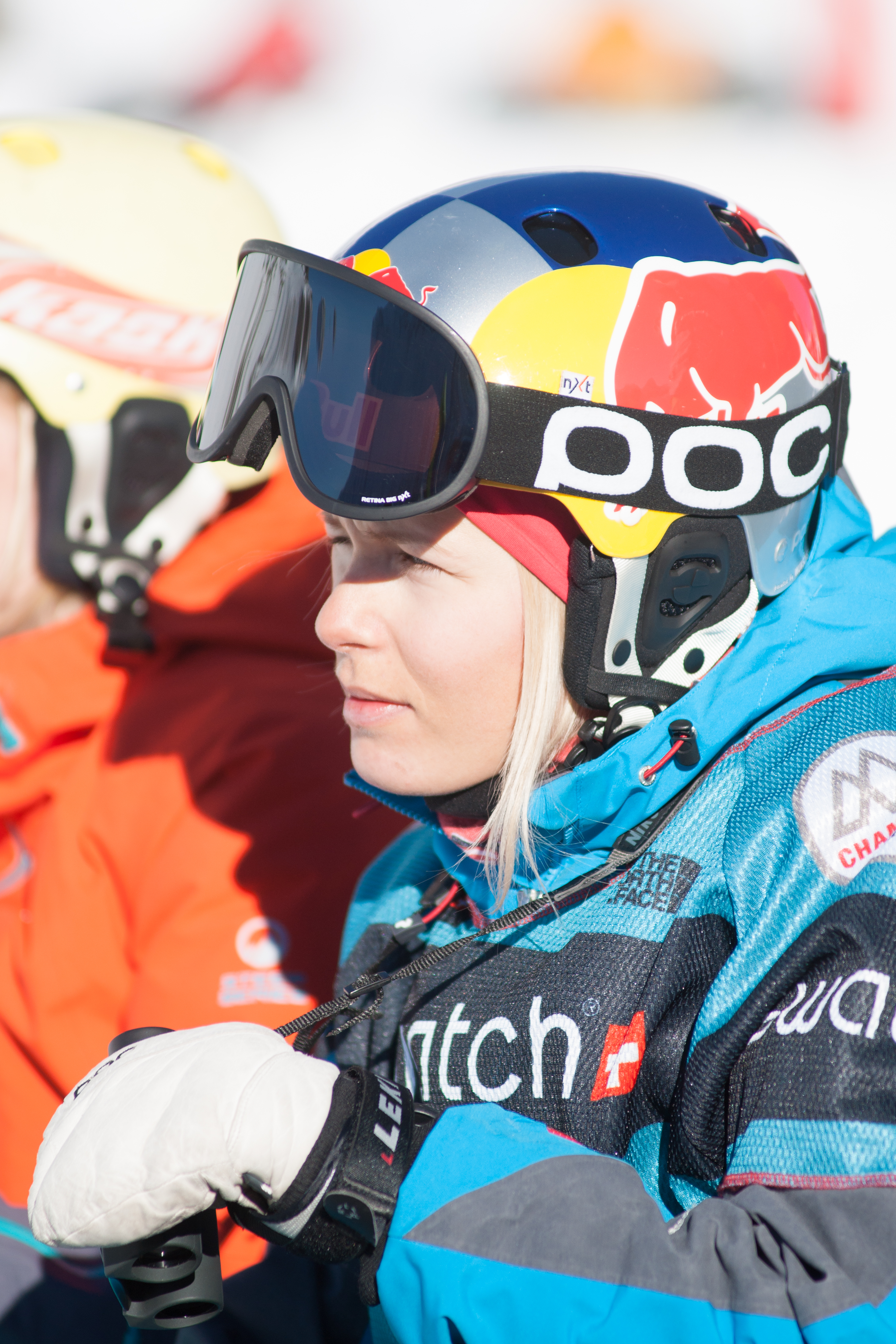
- Rapaport at the 2014 Freeride World Tour in Chamonix

Personal information
- Nationality: Swedish
- Born: 29 January 1986
- Died: 18 July 2016 (aged 30) Santiago, Chile
- Occupation: Skier
- Spouse: Mattias Hargin (m. 2016–2016) (her death)

Matilda Rapaport (29 January 1986 – 18 July 2016) was a Swedish alpine free-skier. She was married to Swedish alpine skier Mattias Hargin, and was the niece of Swedish actress Alexandra Rapaport.

== Career ==
Rapaport was the winner of the Xtreme Verbier event of the Freeride World Tour in 2013.

== Death ==
On 14 July 2016 Rapaport was involved in an avalanche accident during the filming of a promotional video for Ubisoft's (then) upcoming video game Steep, in Farellones, Chile. She was buried under the snow and fell into a coma. She was brought to a hospital in Santiago de Chile where she died on 18 July 2016.

== Filmography ==
=== Film ===
| 2013 | Shades of Winter | documentary |
| 2014 | Pure | documentary |
| 2015 | A Skier Knows - Spirit of Alaska | documentary |
| 2015 | A Skier Knows - Entering a Skier's Mind | documentary |
| 2016 | Between | documentary (tribute) |

== Video games ==
| Year | Title | Role | Notes |
|---|---|---|---|
| 2016 | Steep | | promotion |
