= ESPN X Games Skateboarding =

2001 video game

- North American PS2 cover art
- Developers: Konami Computer Entertainment Osaka (PS2); Konami Honolulu Studio (GBA)
- Publisher: Konami
- Platforms: PlayStation 2, Game Boy Advance
- Release: PlayStation 2: NA: August 14, 2001; JP: September 20, 2001; EU: January 25, 2002; Game Boy Advance: NA: September 13, 2001; JP: October 25, 2001; EU: November 16, 2001
- Genre: Sports
- Modes: Single-player, multiplayer

ESPN X Games Skateboarding is a video game developed by Konami for the PlayStation 2 and Game Boy Advance. The PlayStation 2 version was released in North America on August 14, 2001, in Japan on September 20, 2001, and in Europe on January 25, 2002, while the Game Boy Advance version was released in North America on September 12, 2001, in Japan on October 25, and in Europe on November 16. The game was released as part of Konami's ESPN The Games brand.

== Featured skaters ==
Default skaters

- Bob Burnquist
- Chris Senn
- Colin McKay
- Kerry Getz
- Carlos de Andrade
- Lincoln Ueda
- Chad Fernandez
- Rick McCrank

Unlockable skaters

- Rollie McNulty
- Kaiell Williams

== Gameplay ==
Aside from the practice, multiplayer, and free skate modes, players can participate in an X Games competition in either street or vert. In X Games, players attempt to earn the highest score within a one-minute time limit. One of the playable levels is inspired by the halfpipe used in X Games Six. The game also has an arcade mode, where players roam levels and complete various goals, and collecting spinning X Games logos, which unlocks other playable levels.

In the Game Boy Advance version, players increase their attributes via the X-Rage meter, where players fill up the meter by performing tricks, which later will cause a coin to appear on the halfpipe. After the player grabs the coin, they're flown higher into the air, and players are to perform a 10-trick combo. If the player successfully accomplishes this, gems will fall down onto the halfpipe, which players can collect. If players grab enough gems of a particular color, the skater the player is playing as will have his attributes raised in a specific section.

== Reception ==
Reception

Aggregate score
| Aggregator | Score | |
| Aggregator | GBA | PS2 |
|---|---|---|
| Metacritic | 61/100 | 58/100 |

Review scores
| Publication | Score | |
| Publication | GBA | PS2 |
|---|---|---|
| Electronic Gaming Monthly | N/A | 6/10 |
| Famitsu | 25/40 | 33/40 |
| Game Informer | N/A | 5/10 |
| GamePro | N/A | 2.5/5 |
| GameRevolution | N/A | C− |
| GameSpot | 6.7/10 | 4.4/10 |
| GameSpy | N/A | 52% |
| IGN | 5.5/10 | 4.9/10 |
| Next Generation | N/A | 2/5 |
| Nintendo Power | 2/5 | N/A |
| Official U.S. PlayStation Magazine | N/A | 4/5 |
| Maxim | N/A | 7/10 |

In Japan, Famitsu gave the PlayStation 2 version a score of 33 out of 40. The game itself received more mixed reviews in the West, however, according to the review aggregation website Metacritic. David Smith of IGN praised the ESPN integration of the PS2 version, while criticizing the aforementioned inconsistent graphics throughout the levels in arcade mode. Jeff Gerstmann of GameSpot also criticized the graphics of the same console version, along with the controls. Jim Preston of NextGen compared the game to "plain vanilla [yogurt] without the sprinkles."

Craig Harris of IGN praised the presentation of the GBA version, and unlike the PS2 version, gave a higher score for the graphics, but Harris would also criticize the overall gameplay and potential lasting appeal. Frank Provo of GameSpot said of the same handheld version, "It is really too bad that the park competition is so incomplete and lackluster, as it virtually ensures that few people will ever purchase the game and experience the sheer joy of the more magically delicious vert competition." In Japan, however, Famitsu gave it a score of 25 out of 40.

== See also ==
- ESPN Winter X-Games Snowboarding
- Evolution Skateboarding
