= Snow Wave: Avalanche =

1998 video game

- Developer(s): Hammer Technologies
- Publisher(s): Hammer Technologies
- Platform(s): Windows
- Release: 1998
- Genre(s): Snowboarding
- Mode(s): Single player, Multiplayer

Snow Wave: Avalanche is a 1998 arcade snowboarding video game developed and published by the Spanish company Hammer Technologies. The game was the second release in Hammer's "Hammer Sports" line, following Tie Break Tennis '98. In addition to its single-player mode, Snow Wave supports multiplayer gameplay for up to four players.

== Development ==
Snow Wave was developed on the Avalanche 3D game engine, which was created for the game. The band MataMala provided the game's soundtrack. During Snow Wave's development, it was cited as the first computer game dedicated to snowboarding, despite the genre's popularity on other systems.

Spain's game development scene was struggling at the time of Snow Wave's creation. Hammer reported that development had grown "much harder" since the golden age of Spanish software during the 8-bit era, and that most of the country's industry had dried up. However, the Spanish magazines Game Over and PC Top Player cited Snow Wave as evidence that domestic game development was rebounding. A writer for the latter publication argued that the title was part of a growth trend for Spanish games, on the heels of the domestic hit Commandos: Behind Enemy Lines.

== Reception ==
Reception

Review scores
| Publication | Score |
|---|---|
| PC Gamer (US) | 80% |
| Game Over | 94% |
| PC Top Player | 87/100 |

Alan Wilder of Game Over summarized Snow Wave as "radically good", while PC Top Player's Alfredo Vegas declared it "a great game". Writing for PC Gamer US, Joe Novicki found Snow Wave "competent and entertaining", despite docking it points for its high system requirements.
