= Steep (video game) =

2016 video game

- Developer: Ubisoft Annecy (Note: Additional work by Ubisoft Kyiv, Ubisoft Montpellier and Ubisoft Sofia)
- Publisher: Ubisoft
- Directors: Igor Monceau; Arnaud Ragot
- Producer: Sébastien Arnoult
- Designer: Arnaud Mametz
- Programmer: Grégory Garcia
- Writer: Barry Keating
- Composer: Zikali
- Engine: AnvilNext 2.0
- Platforms: PlayStation 4; Windows; Xbox One
- Release: 2 December 2016
- Genre: Sports
- Modes: Single-player, multiplayer

Steep is a sports video game developed by Ubisoft Annecy and published by Ubisoft. It was released worldwide on 2 December 2016 for PlayStation 4, Windows, and Xbox One.

Developed by Ubisoft Annecy beginning in 2013, it was their first original game. It is set in the Alps, where players can participate in several winter and action sports disciplines, skiing, snowboarding, paragliding and wingsuit flying. With later downloadable content, mountains in Alaska, Japan and Korea were also included in the game and rocket-powered wingsuit flying, sledding, BASE jumping, and speed riding were incorporated as additional sports. Furthermore, two of the game's expansions allowed the player to take part in the Winter X Games and the 2018 Winter Olympics. The game places a great emphasis on online multiplayer, focusing on competing in various winter sporting challenges with other players online.

Upon release, the game received mixed reviews. While critics lauded the overall graphics, vast open world and enjoyable activities, they also pointed out its lack of direction and overall scope, while criticism was also directed at the fact that being online was mandatory to play most of the game.

== Gameplay ==
A gameplay screenshot showing a player snowboarding down a mountain

Steep is an online multiplayer extreme sports game set in an open world environment of the Alps, centered on the Mont Blanc, the tallest mountain in Europe, which can be explored freely by players. Later downloadable content (DLC) also added the Alaska Range, centered on Denali (formerly known as Mount McKinley), the tallest mountain in North America, as well as Japanese and Korean mountain ranges into the game. Korea features the venues of the 2018 Winter Olympics in Pyeongchang County. The game can be played from either a first-person or third-person perspective. The game also utilizes camera angles similar to GoPro during races, via a sponsoring deal. The four main activities available in the game include skiing, wingsuit flying, snowboarding, and paragliding. With later DLC, rocket-powered wingsuit flying, sledding, basejumping, and speed riding were also incorporated. Players can switch between these activities by using the game's menu wheel.

Steep is an online-focused game, in which all players share the same game world, engaging in various sports activities simultaneously. Players can collide with each other unless disabled in the settings. To navigate the world quickly, players can use the "mountain view" mode, which shows different "drop zones" in the game. These drop zones serve as fast travel points that allow players to reach different parts of the game's world without having to actually move that distance. There are various hidden races, challenges, and areas, which can be discovered and unlocked through exploring the world. Players are equipped with a pair of binoculars, which can be used to discover new locations.

The game has a trick system, which allows players to perform special maneuvers such as spinning and grabbing while they are skiing or snowboarding. Players receive points if they perform tricks. If the player performs excellently in a race, they will receive a medal as an award. When the player crashes during a challenge, they have the ability to retry it immediately and view the amount of g-Force the player's character endured during the crash. When players move around on the map, their path will be recorded automatically and can be viewed through entering the mountain mode. Players capture screenshots and view their own performance data. These replays can be shared to the game's community and various social networking sites. Players can set and share their trail as a challenge for other players. There are six types of play style ranging from racing, to exploring.

The game features a nonlinear story, that follows the chosen player characters as they seek to become a winter and extreme sports legend. To achieve the rank of "Ultimate Legend", the characters have to attain legendary status in all six disciplines the game has to offer. With later DLCs, the player can also enter the Winter X Games, and take part in an event called "Winterfest", where he has to overcome costumed adversaries to be crowned the "King of Winter". The "Road To The Olympics" featured a new story campaign, in which the player character, an aspiring winter sports athlete, has to complete a series of events to qualify for the 2018 Olympic Games and become the first athlete to win gold medals in all three freestyle disciplines: big air, slopestyle, and halfpipe.

== Development ==
The game was developed by Ubisoft Annecy, a French studio which had previously worked on the multiplayer modes of the Assassin's Creed franchise and the Tom Clancy's Splinter Cell franchise as well as assisting in the development of Tom Clancy's The Division. The game was co-developed by Ubisoft studios in Kyiv and Montpellier. Steep became the first original game created by them. Development of the game was started in late 2013. The concept was inspired by the developer's close proximity to the Alps, and another Ubisoft game, Tom Clancy's Ghost Recon Wildlands, whose large open world forced developer Ubisoft Paris to implement transport methods such as paragliding. The Trials series also influenced the game's design. Ubisoft originally was not convinced by the development team's concept, but they later greenlit the project's development, mainly due to the huge popularity of extreme sporting videos on the video sharing website YouTube. The developers were also inspired by the renewed interest in the skateboarding game Skate 3 after it was re-popularized through Let's Play streaming events performed by YouTubers and others. According to Igor Manceau, the game's director, the team pitched the project to Ubisoft as they believed that the game's online structure and open world are elements that are new to the sports genre.

Manceau claimed that the game was a "passion project" and a "natural progression" for the studio, and that it was designed to be accessible for newcomers and complex for fans of the genre. The team collaborated with the action sport industry and consulted several professional skiers and extreme sports athletes and experts, such as Louis Aikins, Kevin Rolland, Sammy Luebke, and Horacio Llorens. However, one of the professional skiers, Matilda Rapaport, died while shooting a promotion video for the game in Farellones, Chile due to a sudden avalanche accident.

The game was revealed with a trailer and playable demo at the 2016 Electronic Entertainment Expo as the closing act to Ubisoft's press conference. An open beta was set to be released prior to the game's official launch. Steep was released for PlayStation 4, Windows, and Xbox One on 2 December 2016. A new region, Alaska, was introduced into the game as a free update soon after the game's release. A version for the Nintendo Switch was announced but later canceled.

=== Additional expansions ===
The game was supported by a season pass during the first year of its release cycle. The season pass included the Winterfest DLC, adding sledging and new challenges, the Extreme Pack, adding speed riding, basejumping and rocket-powered wingsuits, as well as the Adrenaline Pack, adding night races and new outfits. In June, at E3 2017, Ubisoft announced that a Winter Olympics expansion, Steep: Road to the Olympics, would be released on 5 December 2017. The expansion featured new mountain ranges in Korea and Japan and let the player take part in the 2018 Winter Olympics. For the third year of the release cycle, the X Games Pass could be purchased, including the Rocket Wings DLC, adding more rocket-powered wingsuit events, the 90s DLC, adding 90s-themend clothing, as well as the eponymous X Games DLC, allowing the player to enter the Winter X Games competition. All three releases could be purchased separately or as enhanced versions of the base game, respectively. Access to the Road to the Olympics DLC was removed from the game in 2022 to comply with third party rights.

== Reception ==
Reception

Aggregate score
Aggregator	Score
Metacritic	(PC) 72/100 (PS4) 71/100 (XONE) 72/100

Review scores
Publication	Score
Destructoid	6/10
Edge	7/10
Electronic Gaming Monthly	6/10
Game Informer	8.5/10
GameRevolution	4/5
GameSpot	7/10
GamesRadar+	3.5/5
IGN	7.9/10
Polygon	8/10

Steep received "mixed or average" reviews, according to Metacritic. While critics generally lauded the game's vast open world and enjoyable activities, critics also pointed out its lack of direction and overall scope, with critique also being directed at its always-online concept. In February 2019, Ubisoft announced that Steep was played by 10 million individual players.

Matthew Kato of Game Informer awarded the game a positive review. While he was initially wondering if a game solely centered on extreme sports and a vast open world would capture the players, he found Steep to be very captivating through its open world, gameplay, and atmosphere. He called the "volume of challenges [...] admirable, as is the scale of its open world", but was especially pleased with how well the world was tailored to cater to each discipline, thus interacting with the world was a "breathtaking and demanding" process. He noted that the trick system was aimed at accessibility and thus did not provide a feeling akin to the Tony Hawk's series of video games. TJ Hafer of IGN also rated the game positively for similar reasons, describing Steep's world as "one of the most diverse and visually interesting open worlds" in video games. He called the physics of the game "satisfying" and noted that they managed to find a balance between realistic and arcade approaches. Unlike other critics, he found the open concept of the game to be working out well. He lauded the game for its well executed controls, which he described as "intense, engaging, and at times [...] frantic." Also, he praised the game's open world, which he described as "gorgeous" and also "just awe-inspiringly gargantuan", with its "grandiose, attractive environments".

Ray Castillo of EGM gave the game an average rating and was more critical. He too lauded Ubisoft Annecy for the game's graphics and world design, stating, that the "game looks gorgeous, and each mountainside has character to it." Furthermore, he noted the customization options for the different characters as very rich. However, he was critical of the game's map and objective structure, stating that the map opens up too early and is convoluted, while the presentation of objectives is confusing, and they do not seem to be designed to lead the player to an end goal through constant progress. This led him to conclude that the game lacked direction. He called the fact that the game has to have an internet connection to be played "unforgivable". He concluded, that while the game had "a lot of good ideas at its core", it was "more frustrating than fun." Similarly, Hafer noted that the paragliding path was the least entertaining of the four initial play styles but if a player wanted to complete the game, he was forced to do these events. Furthermore, he missed the option of increasing a character's stats, as it was handled in most classic extreme sport titles.

=== Additional expansions ===
The additional expansions were similarly received as the main game. The Road to the Olympics DLC was criticized by Kato of for providing little substance. While he enjoyed the Japanese mountain ranges, he was very critical of the game's new story mode and the Korean mountain. He noted that the mode "half-heartedly attempts the staging of its own Olympic drama" without conveying an Olympic experience. The decision to only include freestyle disciplines in the story while completely omitting skiing events such as Super-G or giant slalom added to that sentiment. He questioned the decision to include the Korean mountain ranges where the Olympics took place but not making them accessible in freeride mode. All in all, he noted that the expansion "restrict what is best about Steep with little to show for it in return." Chris Shive of Hardcore Gamer was less critical of the expansion, calling the new story mode "a goal-focused narrative that so many gamers have been conditioned to crave", while noting the game's stunning visuals, especially in the Japanese mountains.

The X Games Pass was described by Michele Sollazzo of Eurogamer as a completion of the game's development, bringing it to its final form. Also, he noted that the expansion provided a good contrast to the previous Road to Olympics expansion, as it focused more on extreme sports. While he noted the X Games expansion itself as short, he found the competitions to be rather challenging. Stefan Stuursma of XGN also noted the difficulty of the X Games events and felt the new challenges added depth to the game. However, he criticized Ubisoft for not including a new area and the relative small amount of content in the new DLC package.

=== Accolades ===
The game won "Best Sports Game" at the 2016 Gamescom Awards and the 2016 Game Critics Awards, as well as "Sports Game of the Year" at the 20th Annual D.I.C.E. Awards.

Award	Year	Category	Result	Ref.
Gamescom Awards	2016	Best Sports Game	Won	
Game Critics Awards	2016	Best Sports Game	Won	
20th Annual D.I.C.E. Awards	2017	Sports Game of the Year	Won	

== See also ==
- List of Olympic video games
- List of snowboarding video games
- Riders Republic, a 2021 extreme sports game also developed by Ubisoft Annecy
