= Cool Boarders 2 =

1997 video game

- North American cover art
- Developer: UEP Systems
- Publishers: JP: UEP Systems; WW: Sony Computer Entertainment
- Directors: Makota Sunaga; Masaya Kobayashi
- Producer: Kimiaki Kurashima
- Designers: Tadayuki Konno; Yasuhito Sakaue; Masaru Katada; Tomoyuki Ohsumi; Mayumi Ishitsuka; Masaki Shimizu
- Programmers: Kiyoshi Tsukada; Akira Kitahara; Tadashi Maki; Takafumi Fujii
- Composers: Atsunori Nanba; Yoshichika Shimamura
- Series: Cool Boarders
- Platform: PlayStation
- Release: JP: August 28, 1997; NA: November 11, 1997; EU: February 1, 1998
- Genre: sports (snowboarding)
- Modes: Single-player, multiplayer

Cool Boarders 2 (known as Cool Boarders 2: Killing Session in Japan) is a 1997 snowboarding video game developed by UEP Systems for the PlayStation. The game builds upon its predecessor's features with the addition of trick competitions, computer-controlled competitors, and support for the PlayStation Link Cable, allowing two-player, non-split screen multiplayer.

The main aim remains to complete courses in the shortest time (aided this time around by shortcuts), to perform the best-scoring tricks and to rack up huge total scores. There are more unlockables and also the option to customize the snowboard's graphics. The game offers 7 snowboarders, 18 snowboards and 10 courses to compete on. The PAL version of the game was one of the 20 games pre-loaded on the PlayStation Classic (excluding Japan, Taiwan and Hong Kong), which was released on December 3, 2018.

== Background ==
The game's predecessor, Cool Boarders, was released for the PlayStation the year prior, in 1996. Despite mixed reviews, Cool Boarders was a sleeper success, and eventually attained a Greatest Hits edition. As snowboarding began to gain in popularity in the West during the late 1990s, so did snowboarding video games. Developer/publisher UEP Systems began work on a sequel to take advantage of this.

Cool Boarders 2 was unveiled at the April 1997 Tokyo Game Show, where it drew large crowds despite UEP's small booth. It was released in Japan for the PlayStation on August 28, 1997.

Other entries in the genre began trickling in, most notably 1080° Snowboarding. The original developer, UEP Systems, sold the rights to the name of the series in the US. This resulted in three US-based sequels. In Japan, the series continued with Cool Boarders Burrrn for the Sega Dreamcast under UEP's guiding force, before "ending" with the PlayStation 2's Cool Boarders: Code Alien.

An emulated release for the PlayStation Network as a PS one Classic was released in Europe on October 30, 2008, in North America on August 27, 2009, and in Japan on November 23, 2011.

== Reception ==
Reception

Aggregate score
Aggregator	Score
GameRankings	70%

Review scores
Publication	Score
AllGame	3.5/5
Electronic Gaming Monthly	7/10
Famitsu	8/10, 7/10, 9/10, 7/10
Game Informer	9/10
GameFan	83% (Note: Three critics of GameFan gave the game each a score of 90, 83, and 75.)
GameRevolution	B−
GameSpot	6.5/10
IGN	7.2/10
Next Generation	3/5
Official U.S. PlayStation Magazine	4/5
Dengeki PlayStation	85/100, 80/100
Extreme Playstation	90%

Cool Boarders 2 received mixed reviews. While most critics found the game's physics model greatly improved from the original Cool Boarders, and the new half-pipe mode was received with great enthusiasm, some felt the overall improvement was not enough to make it the game that Cool Boarders should have been. Next Generation elaborated that "The graphics are still choppy, with glaring black seams interrupting the white tracks, and the track design is less than inspiring. However, the half-pipe mode is so much fun that it makes you almost overlook the game's problems. A definite mixed bag." IGN similarly reported, "Most of the drawbacks of the first have been addressed in the second game, and a few new things, like the half-pipe, have been added to great effect. However, it is still plagued with problems that afflicted the first, and in some cases are even worse." Conversely, GamePro called it "a startling, top-to-bottom improvement upon its predecessor", (Note: GamePro gave the game 4.5/5 for graphics, 4.5/5 for fun factor, 2.5/5 for sound, and 4.0/5 for control.) and Crispin Boyer remarked in Electronic Gaming Monthly that "I wasn't a big fan of the original, but Cool Boarders 2 surprised me with its depth of gameplay."

Critics generally praised the game's vast number of tricks and the complicated button combinations and timings required to pull them off, finding them an engaging challenge. The graphics were less well-received, with many noting a good deal of polygon breakup. Josh Smith of GameSpot, while noting the breakup, felt the smooth animations for the various tricks provide ample visual payoff for the player's efforts. He also praised the freedom the gameplay provides once the player has gotten a basic handle of pulling off tricks. The game held a 70% on GameRankings, based on an aggregate of 12 reviews, at the time of the site's 2019 closure.

Game Informer placed the game 92nd on their top 100 video games of all time, praising the game as the high point of the series.
