= SBK: Snowboard Kids =

2005 video game

- Developer: Inglove
- Publishers: NA: Atlus USA; JP: Atlus; EU: Rising Star Games
- Platform: Nintendo DS
- Release: NA: November 22, 2005; JP: November 24, 2005; EU: April 28, 2006
- Genre: Snowboarding
- Modes: Single-player, multiplayer

SBK: Snowboard Kids, released in Japan as Snowboard Kids Party (スノボキッズパーティー, Sunobo Kizzu Pātī), is a snowboarding video game for the Nintendo DS, released in November 2005 in North America and Japan, and in Europe on April 28, 2006. It is the third and final game in the Snowboard Kids series. Up to four players can play wirelessly with one game card.

== Characters ==
The game features characters Slash Kamei, Brad Maltinie, Nancy Neil, Jamjars "Jam" Kuehnemund, Koyuki Tanaka, Thomas "Tommy" Parsy, and Max. Jack Frost, the mascot of Atlus and a demon from the Megami Tensei series, appears as a hidden character. Black Frost, a more sinister-looking version of Jack Frost, has improved stats.

Linda Maltinie, who initiated most of the competitions in the previous Snowboard Kids games, is absent and has been replaced by Brad.

The characters’ super deformed, large-nosed style has been discontinued, and they now have a more standard, anime-esque appearance. Some characters have undergone significant personality changes, most notably Nancy and Tommy. Both were previously mild-mannered, kind, and friendly, but now exhibit mean-spirited and even borderline antagonistic behavior.

== Reception ==
Reception

Aggregate score
Aggregator	Score
Metacritic	63/100

Review scores
Publication	Score
Eurogamer	4/10
Famitsu	28/40
Game Informer	6/10
GameSpot	6.7/10
GameSpy	3/5
IGN	6.2/10
NGC Magazine	75%
Nintendo Power	7.5/10
Nintendo World Report	6.5/10
X-Play	2/5

SBK: Snowboard Kids received "mixed" reviews according to the review aggregation website Metacritic.

GameSpot praised the game for its lengthy courses and likened it to a mix of SSX and Mario Kart, but criticized it for having less personality than the previous two games in the series. IGN also commended the game for its time trials and slalom missions but criticized it for a lack of focus on real arcade racing balance. Nintendo Power, however, described it as "Mario Kart on ice." In Japan, Famitsu awarded it a score of one eight, two sevens, and one six for a total of 28 out of 40, while Famitsu Cube + Advance also gave it four sevens for a total of 28 out of 40.
