= 1080° Avalanche =

2003 snowboarding video game

- European cover art
- Developer: Nintendo Software Technology
- Publisher: Nintendo
- Director: Vivek Melwani
- Producers: Shigeki Yamashiro; Shigeru Miyamoto
- Designers: Richard Vorodi; Keith Friedly; Wing S. Cho
- Artist: Michael Harrington
- Composers: Lawrence Schwedler; James Phillipsen
- Series: 1080° Snowboarding
- Platform: GameCube
- Release: EU: November 28, 2003; NA: December 1, 2003; JP: January 22, 2004
- Genre: Snowboarding
- Modes: Single-player, multiplayer

1080° Avalanche (Note: Released in Japan as 1080° Silverstorm (テン·エイティ シルバーストーム, Ten Eiti Shirubāsutōmu)) is a snowboarding video game developed by Nintendo Software Technology and published by Nintendo for the GameCube. It was released on November 28, 2003, in Europe, on December 1, 2003, in North America, and on January 22, 2004, in Japan. Avalanche is a sequel to the 1998 video game 1080° Snowboarding for the Nintendo 64. In contrast to similar snowboarding games such as the SSX series, the game emphasizes the speed of downhill racing more than stunts and tricks.

== Gameplay ==
Similar to 1080° Snowboarding, gameplay focuses on racing more than performing stunts. There are differences between this game and Snowboarding, with one being the Avalanche - the final event of every Match Race challenge is a daredevil run through an avalanche-prone trail where the player has to outrun an avalanche that starts in the middle of the run or even at the very start. In over 20 courses, the players can compete in the main Match mode, along with Trick Attack, Time Trial, and Gate modes. The game supports four player split screen multiple on one GameCube, as well as LAN play with up to four connected GameCubes.

Unlike the first game, each rider has unique boards, and up to three new boards for each character can be unlocked along with bonus boards, which are surreal objects replacing the snowboard, such as a penguin or an NES controller.

== Development and release ==
Shortly after the release of 1080° Snowboarding (1998), Nintendo announced that Left Field Productions was taking over development for a sequel title on the Nintendo 64. Pre-production planning was done on the game, but it was cancelled early on in favor of moving development to the then-upcoming GameCube platform. When Left Field later ended their exclusivity contract with Nintendo, their work was returned to Nintendo, and the game was reworked internally by Nintendo to release as 1080° Avalanche (2003) for the GameCube. Development of the game was handed to Nintendo's American development studio, Nintendo Software Technology Corporation (NST). The final product features visual output at 480p and Dolby Pro Logic II sound.

1080° Avalanche was released in both single-disc and double-disc versions. The second disc is a standard miniDVD featuring a half-hour of snowboarding footage alongside gameplay footage set to soundtracks from the game. This version was exclusively available at Walmart and can be differentiated by the presence of a red sash on the front cover.

== Reception ==
Reception

Aggregate scores
| Aggregator | Score |
|---|---|
| GameRankings | 75 of 100 (based on 47 reviews) |
| Metacritic | 73 of 100 (based on 37 reviews) |

Review scores
| Publication | Score |
|---|---|
| GameSpot | 6.7 of 10 |
| IGN | 7.3 of 10 |
| Jeuxvideo.com | 14 of 20 |

It received a score of 7.5/7/5.5 from Electronic Gaming Monthly. Dan Hsu, the first reviewer, found fault with the game's trick system, while the third reviewer, Shawn Elliott, severely criticised it, believing that Avalanche can't compete with SSX 3.
