= Snowboard Kids =

1997 video game

- North American cover art
- Developer: Racdym
- Publishers: WW: Atlus; EU: Nintendo
- Directors: Hideki Yayama; Takeshi Murata
- Producer: Hiroyuki Tanaka
- Designer: Yumiko Hattori
- Composers: Isao Kasai; Tomohiko Sato
- Platforms: Nintendo 64, PlayStation
- Release: Nintendo 64: JP: December 12, 1997; NA: March 13, 1998; PAL: March 16, 1998; PlayStation: JP: January 21, 1999
- Genre: Snowboarding
- Modes: Single-player, multiplayer

Snowboard Kids (スノボキッズ, sunobokizzu), is a snowboarding video game for the Nintendo 64. It was developed by Racdym and published by Atlus. Many reviewers compared its style to that of the Mario Kart series. An enhanced port, Snowboard Kids Plus, was released in Japan in January 1999 for the PlayStation.

== Gameplay ==
In addition to the usual gameplay of a snowboarding game, Snowboard Kids adds "Shots" (special weapons used to attack players) and items which can help the player, hinder other players, or both.

Modes of play include a single-player adventure game, head-to-head racing between up to four players, and time trials.

The game has nine main courses. Although many of the courses are snowy mountains, some are courses that would be unorthodox for snowboarding in the real world. Such courses include an amusement park, a desert, a vast valley, a dark highway, and a Japanese village during the cherry blossom festival. Each track has a unique shape, containing various obstacles, hazards, and short-cuts.

There are two item slots, allowing each player to carry a shooting item and support item (such as a rock, or invisibility) at the same time. Players are required to pay 100 gold in order to collect an item during a race. Gold can be obtained either through performing tricks or collecting coins scattered across the course. All courses also require players to race down the hill for multiple laps. At the bottom of the hill, the player needs to pass through the lift gate to be transported back to the top of the hill, and cannot be attacked by other players in this transition.

=== Playable characters ===
Snowboard Kids features six playable characters: Slash, Nancy, Jam, Linda, Tommy, and Shinobin, the last being the only unlockable character in the game, becoming available after the player completes all nine tracks. The characters have three aspects which affect their racing style: speed, which determines the straight line speed of the character; corner, which determines how quickly the character is able to turn; and trick, which determines the hangtime characters get while jumping, allowing for tricks to be executed to earn the player coins.

== Development ==
The game was showcased at the Tokyo Game Show held on September 5–7, 1997.

== Reception ==
Reception

Review scores
Publication	Score
Computer and Video Games	2/5
Electronic Gaming Monthly	8.5/10, 8/10, 8.5/10, 8/10
IGN	8/10
Joypad	88%
M! Games	63%
Mega Fun	73/100
N64 Magazine	86%
Next Generation	3/5
Nintendo Life	7/10
Nintendo Power	7.5/10
Official Nintendo Magazine	81%
Superjuegos	92/100
Super Game Power	4/5
Video Games (DE)	81%

The game was generally well received by critics. The most common criticism made against it was lack of originality, with most reviews characterizing it as a Mario Kart clone which fails to offer any meaningful innovation to interest Mario Kart enthusiasts. However, most concluded that while the lack of innovation prevents Snowboard Kids from being a great game, it is still a good one. Some of the more common praises were that the controls are smooth and effectively communicate the sensation of snowboarding, the course designs are inventive and pleasing, and the variety of modes and minigames offer a good deal of depth and replay value. IGN referred to the game as "a solid title that incorporates the graphic and gameplay styles of Mario Kart into a snowboarding environment. The result is a satisfyingly cute snow racer that's sure to please gamers more interested in a simplistic shreddin' experience than a realistic one." Next Generation stated that "In the final analysis, Snowboard Kids is an entertaining title that, despite its lack of originality, does most things right. Considering the infrequency of truly compelling N64 titles, gamers could do worse than spending some time on the slopes with Snowboard Kids."

Computer and Video Games dismissed Snowboard Kids as "very average and not worth more than a few hours play." GamePro commented that the game lacks longevity and that many gamers would not have the stomach to endure its "stifling kiddie atmosphere", but found that the game offers enough underlying depth and fun, especially in multiplayer mode, to be an outstanding experience for the right players. They recommended renting it to test out one's taste for it. (Note: GamePro gave Snowboard Kids 4.0/5 for fun factor, 4.0/5 for graphics, 4.0/5 for control, and 3.0/5 for sound.) The Electronic Gaming Monthly review team were more unreservedly enthusiastic. Crispin Boyer was particularly pleased with the way power-ups are purchased rather than merely collected and how, similarly to Mario Kart 64, the power-ups are used to dynamically balance the race to always be a close contest. Contradicting the usual assessment that Snowboard Kids lacks originality, his co-reviewer Dan Hsu commented, "This Mario-Kart-on-the-snowy-slopes sleeper hit has just about everything going for it: solid controls, great graphics and semiradical action. This is more than just a Mario Kart wanna-be - a few new features make it stand out over its competition."

In a retrospective review, Nintendo Life concluded that "With bold, colourful graphics, tons of charm, memorable tunes and, most importantly, tight gameplay, Snowboard Kids is worthy of a place in anyone’s collection. Atlus’s first foray into the world of snowboarding on the Nintendo 64 may not present a particularly lengthy challenge or deep experience, but it can always be relied upon to provide a quick blast of fun now and then, alone or with friends."

In Europe, the game earned the Player's Choice label, indicating sales of at least one million units.

== Sequels ==
In 1999, a sequel, Snowboard Kids 2, was released for the Nintendo 64. SBK: Snowboard Kids was released for the Nintendo DS in 2005.
