= Cool Boarders 2001 =

2000 video game

- Developer: Idol Minds
- Publisher: Sony Computer Entertainment
- Producer: Kolbe Launchbaugh
- Programmers: PlayStation; Phil Collins; Alex MacPhee; Jim Mooney; PlayStation 2 Phil Weeks
- Composers: PlayStation; Chuck Carr; Matt Furniss; Womb Music
- Series: Cool Boarders
- Platforms: PlayStation, PlayStation 2
- Release: PlayStation: NA: October 24, 2000; PlayStation 2: NA: May 22, 2001
- Genre: Snowboarding
- Modes: Single-player, multiplayer

Cool Boarders 2001 is a snowboarding video game developed by Idol Minds and published by Sony Computer Entertainment for the PlayStation. A port to the PlayStation 2 was released in 2001. It was released only in North America.

== Reception ==
Reception

Aggregate score
Aggregator	Score	
Aggregator	PS	PS2
Metacritic	56/100	78/100

Review scores
Publication	Score	
Publication	PS	PS2
AllGame	N/A	3.5/5
CNET Gamecenter	7/10	N/A
Electronic Gaming Monthly	4.17/10 (Note: Three critics of Electronic Gaming Monthly gave the PlayStation version each a score of 5/10, 4/10, and 3.5/10.)	7.5/10 (Note: Three critics of Electronic Gaming Monthly gave the PlayStation 2 version each a score of 8/10, 7.5/10, and 7/10.)
EP Daily	3/10	N/A
Game Informer	5.5/10	8.25/10
GameRevolution	C−	B
GameSpot	3.7/10	7.6/10
GameSpy	N/A	74%
IGN	4/10	7.8/10
Next Generation	2/5	2/5
Official U.S. PlayStation Magazine	1/5	4/5
X-Play	3/5	N/A
Maxim	4/10	N/A

The PlayStation 2 version received "generally favorable reviews", while the PlayStation version received "mixed" reviews, according to the review aggregation website Metacritic. Samuel Bass of NextGen said of the latter console version in its January 2001 issue, "A pre-SSX game in a post-SSX era, Cool Boarders 2001 is simply too little, too late." Six issues later, Jeff Lundrigan said of the former console version, "It's not the worst snowboarding game you've ever played, but there are far better ones out there."

Iron Thumbs of GamePro in one review called the PlayStation version "a fun although simple and somewhat dated game. If you are starving for some snow shredding action, jump on it, but if you are looking for some cutting edge carves, hold off for SSX." (Note: GamePro gave the PlayStation version three 4/5 scores for graphics, control, and fun factor, and 3.5/5 for sound in one review.) In another GamePro review, Dr. Zombie said that the same console version "delivers solid snowblowing fun, yet it's pretty much the same experience as the previous edition. First-timers should buy it, while returning pros should rent it for the new courses and features." (Note: GamePro gave the PlayStation version two 4/5 scores for graphics and fun factor, 3.5/5 for sound, and 4.5/5 for control in another review.) Jake The Snake said of the PlayStation 2 version, "If you already have SSX, you don't need Cool Boarders—unless you're a boarding fanatic. Otherwise, you'd do well to try both before buying either." (Note: GamePro gave the PlayStation 2 version three 4/5 scores for graphics, control, and fun factor, and 3.5/5 for sound.)
