= Cool Boarders 3 =

1998 video game

- Developer: Idol Minds
- Publishers: NA: 989 Studios; JP: UEP Systems; EU: Sony Computer Entertainment
- Director: Jonathan Beard
- Producer: Ken George
- Programmers: Mark Lyons; Jim Mooney; Phil Collins; Michael Mayers
- Composers: Chuck Doud; Guttermouth (intro music)
- Series: Cool Boarders
- Platform: PlayStation
- Release: NA: October 27, 1998; JP: November 26, 1998; EU: December 4, 1998
- Genre: Snowboarding
- Modes: Single-player, multiplayer

Cool Boarders 3 is a 1998 snowboarding video game developed by Idol Minds and published by Sony Computer Entertainment for the PlayStation. 989 Studios released the game in North America. UEP Systems, developer of the previous games, released it in Japan on November 26, 1998.

== Gameplay ==
Continuing with the previous games in the series, Cool Boarders 3 gives the player the chance to snowboard down mountain courses while completing tricks to amass points. Some courses like Downhill, Boarder X, and Slalom, require the player to concentrate more on beating their CPU opponents' times to the finish line, while others, namely Slope Style, Half Pipe, and Big Air, force the player to pull off many big tricks in order to build up a large point score. A feature absent from the game which was present in its immediate predecessor is support for the System Link feature, removing the ability for non-split screen, two-player multiplayer.

== Boarders and boards ==
Unlike the previous games in the series, Cool Boarders 3 featured a vast number of playable characters, along with unlockable characters. At the start of the game, there are 13 different boarders with the chance to unlock 8 extra boarders upon beating the high scores.

Cool Boarders 3 also included 11 different snowboards and a further 12 unlockable boards each modeled after real boards from snowboard companies such as Burton and Ride.

== Reception ==
Reception

Aggregate score
Aggregator	Score
GameRankings	71%

Review scores
Publication	Score
AllGame	3.5/5
Computer and Video Games	2/5
Edge	5/10
Electronic Gaming Monthly	6.375/10
Famitsu	30/40
Game Informer	7.75/10
GamePro	5/5
GameRevolution	B+
GameSpot	4.9/10
IGN	6/10
Official U.S. PlayStation Magazine	3/5

The game received mixed reviews according to the review aggregation website GameRankings. Famitsu gave it a score of 30 out of 40.

In its review of Cool Boarders 3, GamePro magazine called the game the best installment of the series, noting an expanded set of stunts, a large number of characters and boards, high-quality graphics with detailed landscapes, and an energetic punk rock soundtrack. According to the critic, despite the challenging controls, the game successfully combines elements of simulation and arcade.

In its first full month of release, Cool Boarders 3 was the seventeenth best-selling home console game in the United States.
