= Cool Boarders Pocket =

2000 video game

- Developer: UEP Systems
- Publisher: SNK
- Series: Cool Boarders
- Platform: Neo Geo Pocket Color
- Release: JP: February 24, 2000; EU: 2000
- Genre: Sports (snowboarding)
- Mode: Single-player

Cool Boarders Pocket is a 2000 snowboarding video game developed by UEP Systems and published by SNK for the Neo Geo Pocket Color.

== Gameplay ==
Cool Boarders Pocket differs to other games in the Cool Boarders series. It features an isometric (overhead) view instead of a third-person perspective. The game features two play modes: a free-ride mode where the player navigates an obstacle course with no restrictions until they reach the goal, and a survival mode where the player snowboards through the obstacle course until they run out of health. The game allows the player to choose one of two characters; a female or male snowboarder.

== Publication history ==
Part of the Cool Boarders series, the game was developed by UEP Systems for the Neo Geo Pocket Color and released in Japan in 2000. Craig Harris of IGN commented that while the game originally had a US release date, this was cancelled along with all other "NeoGeo Pocket Color games, due to SNK USA closing its offices".
