= UEP Systems =

Defunct Japanese video game developer

- Industry: Video games
- Founded: 1985; 41 years ago
- Defunct: July 2001; 25 years ago
- Headquarters: Tokyo, Japan

UEP Systems (ウエップシステム) was a Japanese video game developer founded in 1985. They were best known for their PlayStation-era snowboarding games, though they also released titles for PlayStation 2, Dreamcast, Neo Geo Pocket, and arcade.

== History ==
UEP Systems' most critically acclaimed title is 1997's Cool Boarders 2 for the PlayStation, an early pioneering title of the "action sports" video game genre. The studio's biggest creative release was the quirky 3D action/adventure title Rising Zan: The Samurai Gunman, the studio's only non-sports game, which received sub-par reviews but gained a small amount of cult appeal among gamers at the time. Despite the success of their early snowboarding titles, UEP struggled financially in the years that followed with a series of commercially unsuccessful games. After the release of Cool Boarders: Code Alien - another poor seller - for the PlayStation 2 in 2000, the studio disbanded in 2001.

== Games developed ==
Year	Game	Platform(s)
1996	Cool Boarders	PlayStation
1997	Cool Boarders 2	PlayStation
1999	Rising Zan: The Samurai Gunman	PlayStation
1999	Rippin' Riders Snowboarding	Dreamcast
2000	Cool Boarders Pocket	Neo Geo Pocket Color
2000	Cool Boarders: Code Alien	PlayStation 2
