= 1080° Snowboarding =

1998 video game

- North American cover art
- Developer: Nintendo EAD
- Publisher: Nintendo
- Directors: Masamichi Abe; Mitsuhiro Takano
- Producer: Shigeru Miyamoto
- Programmers: Giles Goddard; Colin Reed
- Artist: Yoshitaka Nishikawa
- Composer: Kenta Nagata
- Series: 1080° Snowboarding
- Platform: Nintendo 64
- Release: JP: 28 February 1998; NA: 1 April 1998; PAL: 9 October 1998
- Genre: Snowboarding
- Modes: Single-player, multiplayer

1080° Snowboarding (Note: Japanese: テン・エイティ スノーボーディング, Hepburn: Ten Eiti Sunōbōdingu) is a snowboarding video game developed and published by Nintendo for the Nintendo 64 in 1998. In the game, players control one of five snowboarders from a third-person perspective, using a combination of buttons to jump and perform tricks across eight levels.

1080° was announced in November 1997 and developed over nine months. It received critical acclaim and won an Interactive Achievement Award from the Academy of Interactive Arts & Sciences. The game sold over two million units. A sequel, 1080° Avalanche, was released for the GameCube in November 2003. The game was re-released for the Wii in 2008 and for the Wii U Virtual Console in 2016. It was also re-released on the Nintendo Classics service in 2023.

== Gameplay ==
A screenshot from a match race in 1080° Snowboarding

Players control snowboarders in various modes. 1080° features two trick modes (Trick Attack and Contest), three race modes (Race, Time Attack, and 2 Players), a Training mode, and an Options mode. The objective of the game is either to reach a level's finish line as quickly as possible or to achieve the highest score by executing trick combinations.

In 1080°'s two trick modes, Trick Attack and Contest, players earn points by completing tricks. In Contest mode, players perform tricks and snowboard past flags to gain points. In Trick Attack mode, players must perform a series of tricks throughout a designated level. The game includes 24 tricks and 5 secret tricks, all executed through combinations of circular movements of the control stick, along with the R, Z, and B buttons. Points are awarded based on the complexity of the tricks, combos, and the time required. The two categories of tricks are grab tricks, where the snowboarder grabs the board in a specific manner, and spin tricks, where the snowboarder spins the board a certain number of degrees. The 1080° spin, the game's most complex trick, requires nine distinct actions to perform.

1080° features three race modes. In these modes, players can achieve victory by selecting alternate routes within a course and balancing the snowboarder after jumps to avoid losing speed. Although tricks are scored in race modes, they do not contribute to winning.

In Match Race mode, the player competes in a series of races against AI-controlled snowboarders. The game tracks the player’s time throughout the level, and the player is assigned a damage meter that fills if the snowboarder falls or is knocked over. The difficulty level in Match Races can be set to normal, hard, or expert, affecting both the complexity and the number of races. If the player fails to defeat an AI competitor, they must retire. The player is given three chances to beat the AI before the game ends.

Players can initially choose from five snowboarders: two from Japan, and one each from Canada, the United States, and the United Kingdom. Each snowboarder has unique abilities and is suited for different levels and modes, as they vary in statistics such as technique, speed, and weight.

Three additional snowboarders can be unlocked by completing certain game levels and modes. Players also start with eight snowboards available for every character, with one additional snowboard unlockable later in the game. Each snowboard is tailored to different situations, as they offer varying strengths in areas such as balance and edge control.

== Development and release ==
1080°'s release was announced on 21 November 1997 at Nintendo's Space World trade show, with its working title previously being Vertical Edge Snowboarding. 1080° was one of several snowboarding games released for the Nintendo 64 in 1998, alongside titles like Big Mountain 2000 and Snowboard Kids. Before its official release, journalists were able to play 1080° at the January 1998 Nintendo Gamers' Summit.

1080° was directed by Masamichi Abe and Misthuro Tanako, programmed by English developers Giles Goddard and Colin Reed, and developed and published by Nintendo. The game was produced by Shigeru Miyamoto. Abe had previously directed Tekken 3 for Namco, while Goddard had programmed the Mario face in Super Mario 64, which was released two years earlier to critical and commercial success. Reed had previously programmed Stunt Race FX. According to Miyamoto, the game "came about because I like skiing. I was thinking about making a skiing game after completing Wave Race [64]. However, the current trend seems to be toward snowboarding. With snowboarding, it seems that you can go places that you can't with skis; for example, in between trees."

Development for 1080° took place at Nintendo's headquarters in Kyoto, Japan. During development, programmers Goddard and Reed used a technique called "skinning" to eliminate joints between the polygons that made up the characters. They combined standard animation with inverse kinematics to create characters whose responses during collisions varied depending on the object hit, the direction of the collision, and the speed of impact. All of the characters' movements were created using motion capture.

Tommy Hilfiger outfits and Lamar snowboards appear in 1080° as part of its product placement. The game's soundtrack, composed by Kenta Nagata, features a mix of "techno and rappy beats" with "thrashy, foozed-out vocals."

Development for 1080° started around April or May 1997 and continued into early 1998. The game was released in Japan on 28 February 1998 and in North America on 1 April. Nintendo prioritized releasing 1080° in Japan while there was still snow on the ground. The European release was delayed to align with the winter season, hoping to boost sales. 1080° was eventually released on 9 October 1998 in Europe and the PAL regions.

== Reception ==
Reception

Aggregate score
Aggregator	Score
Metacritic	88/100

Review scores
Publication	Score
CNET Gamecenter	9/10
Edge	8/10
Electronic Gaming Monthly	8.375/10
Eurogamer	8/10 (Wii)
Famitsu	31/40
Game Informer	9.25/10
GameRevolution	B+
GameSpot	8.6/10
Hyper	90%
IGN	8.6/10 (N64); 8.5/10 (Wii)
N64 Magazine	89%
Next Generation	5/5
Nintendo Life	8/10 (N64); 7/10 (Wii U)
Nintendo Power	8.5/10

1080° Snowboarding received "generally favorable reviews," according to Metacritic, falling just two points short of "universal acclaim". Nintendo Power stated that "Whether you like freeriding or going for Phat Air, you're going to have fun in 1080°." Josh Smith from GameSpot called it "one of the best values in both sports and racing gaming". The game was widely recognized as a leader among snowboarding titles at the time. Edge described it as the "most convincing video game emulation of the snowboarding experience so far," noting its serious tone, which contrasted with other Nintendo games.

The game's graphics were highly praised for their quality on the Nintendo 64. Smith lauded the graphics for their crispness, smoothness, and detail, with minimal polygon dropout. Reviewers also praised the game's camera work, realistic physics model, and its depiction of speed. The game's snow effects were particularly highlighted, as sun reflections varied appropriately between fluffy and packed snow, which also behaved differently in-game. Minor graphical issues, such as occasional pop-up, misplaced shadows, and slight lag when racers passed through trees, were noted but considered insignificant.

Although Edge gave 1080° Snowboarding a generally positive review, it found faults with the game's AI, accusing it of "cheating" due to its tendency to allow CPU opponents to quickly catch up near the end of races. The review also criticized the AI's simplicity, noting that the CPU followed a "limited series of predetermined routes," making it possible for players to predict when the AI would fall over, which allowed them to pass with little satisfaction. Edge also criticized the delay in the game's PAL release, calling it "frankly ludicrous" and suggesting that, with Nintendo's limited number of major releases at the time, any quality title was likely to top the charts easily. Electronic Gaming Monthly's team of four reviewers criticized the small number of courses, saying the game needed more variety and was over too soon. Shawn Smith and John Davison still came away with a positive impression, with Davison saying 1080° Snowboarding exemplified "just how good Nintendo is at creating an overall experience", while John Ricciardi and Dan Hsu felt it was overall "not bad" but that players would be done with it after just a few days.

Other publications were more enthusiastic. Next Generation stated that 1080° Snowboarding set the standard for the snowboarding genre, and multiple publications compared it to how Wave Race 64 revolutionized water-based racing, praising its ability to capture the excitement of snowboarding. GamePro described the snowboard racing as "intense, addictive, and great fun".

Many critics commented that the control scheme is very difficult to learn. Shawn Sackenheim of AllGame considered the game's "highly technical" controls to be a strength, despite their initial difficulty. Computer and Video Games reviewer Alex Huhtala agreed, praising the controls and dismissing the notion of difficulty, stating they were so well-implemented that "you're able to play perfectly well with just one hand on the stick and Z button." GameSpot also complimented the "thoroughly involving" controls, emphasizing the crouch move for tight turns. GamePro remarked that "Because it's realistic, mastery requires practice, but the payoff's there."

GamePro criticized the game's music as repetitive, while IGN described it as "a shining example of what can be achieved on the format," Next Generation said it is exceptional, especially given the Nintendo 64's record of weak audio, and Sackenheim called it "one of the best N64 soundtracks to date." All four of these reviewers praised the sound effects, as did Nintendo Power. In a 2023 retrospective, NME's Mat Ombler said the game's soundtrack helped introduce underground electronic club music, including drum and bass, to a broader audience, similar to the impact of the Wipeout series.

In a 2006 retrospective, Official Nintendo Magazine hailed 1080° Snowboarding for having the best video game representation of snow at the time and commended its sound effects and handling. Steve Jarratt described it as a "stunt-free but fast and fun" experience, highlighting its multiplayer quality. The magazine ranked it as the 87th best game available on Nintendo platforms, noting its realism as a snowboarding game.

The game earned critical accolades, winning the AIAS' Console Sports Game of the Year award at the 2nd Annual Interactive Achievement Awards. It was also nominated for Best Nintendo 64 Game at the 1998 CNET Gamecenter Awards, but lost to The Legend of Zelda: Ocarina of Time.

Commercially, 1080° Snowboarding was a significant success in the United States. According to PC Data, the game sold 817,529 units and generated $40.9 million in revenue by the end of 1998, making it the seventh-best-selling Nintendo 64 game of the year. Over its lifetime, the game sold 1,230,000 units in the U.S. and over 23,000 in Japan. However, it did not surpass the commercial success of the developers' previous game, Wave Race 64, which sold 1,950,000 units in the U.S. and 154,000 in Japan.

1080° Snowboarding was later re-released on the Wii's Virtual Console service in 2008 and on the Wii U in 2016. It was also made available on the Nintendo Classics service on December 7, 2023.

== Sequel ==
1080° Avalanche, the sequel to 1080° Snowboarding, was released for the GameCube in 2003. Unlike its predecessor, the sequel received mixed reviews. Greg Kasavin of GameSpot provided a more critical assessment, citing "frame rate issues and limited gameplay" as major drawbacks that detracted from the experience. Despite its graphical improvements and new features, 1080° Avalanche was unable to match the critical success of the original 1080° Snowboarding.
