= Crowdfunding in video games =

Video game development has typically been funded by large publishing companies or are alternatively paid for mostly by the developers themselves as independent titles. Other funding may come from government incentives or from private funding.

Crowdfunding, where the players of the video games pay to back the development efforts of a game, has become a popular means of finding alternate investment routes. As a way of game monetization, the use of crowdfunding in video games has had a history for several years prior to 2012, but was not seen as viable and limited to small-scale games. The crowdfunding mechanism for video games received significant attention in February 2012 due to the success of Double Fine Adventure (later renamed as Broken Age), a point-and-click adventure game which raised more than $3 million through the Kickstarter service, greatly exceeding the initial $400,000 request. Later the same year, in October 2012, Pillars of Eternity raised $3,986,929 from an initial objective of $1.1 M, thus becoming the highest funded video game project through Kickstarter at that time, and yet beaten a few years later by other projects like Shenmue III (more than $6 M), Bloodstained: Ritual of the Night (more than $5.5 M), or Torment: Tides Of Numenera (more than $4 M). A further boost to the model was seen in July 2012 when the Ouya, a low-cost video game console to be built on the open Android system and designed to take advantage of the mobile video game trend, surpassed $8 million in funding. By mid-2016, more than $186 million has been pledged to video game-related projects through Kickstarter alone.

Less than half of video game crowd-funded projects successfully raise their target funds.

== Crowdfunding ==
Crowdfunding is a means to raise money for a project by eliciting funds from potential users of the completed project. While no third party is required for crowdfunding to occur, web sites like Kickstarter have been created to act as an intermediate in the process: they create space for project creators to share their project, provide ways for users to pledge their funds, and then supply the pledged funds to the creators for those projects that are successfully funded.

Projects using the Kickstarter model generally create multiple tiers of support. A minimum pledge assures that the funder will get the product in some form, but higher pledges will include additional benefits. In the case of video game-related works, this commonly can include being credited in the final work, receiving promotional items like T-shirts, obtaining early access to the game, or meeting the developers in person.

== History ==
The earliest game to have utilized crowdfunding may have been Mount & Blade. As the developers had trouble finding backing from traditional publishers, they instead chose to ask for funding directly from interested individuals. Mount & Blade was funded, developed and released before the popularization of purpose-built online crowdfunding platforms.

Prior to 2012, small independent video game developers had used Kickstarter and other crowdfunding services to generate capital for developing games. However, most of these were funded at small levels, typically no more than $10,000; the largest prior to 2012 was Brandon Boyer's Venus Patrol in October 2011 which gained over $100,000 in funds. Shortly before the announcement of Double Fine Adventure, another game, Code Hero, was able to secure more than $100,000 in funding through a last-minute push by word-of-mouth.

=== Double Fine Adventure ===
2 Player Productions, a film documentary company, approached the studio Double Fine Productions with the prospect of making a film covering the development of a game within the studio. At the time, the studio's other development projects were backed from publisher funding, which would likely have put restrictions on what could be documented. Instead, the developers opted to create a new game from scratch, deciding to use Kickstarter to obtain funding for both the game and the documentary. The studio opted to create an adventure game, a game genre that has been languishing for more than a decade, though one that Double Fine's president Tim Schafer has had an influential history in. The project was tentatively titled Double Fine Adventure, though has since been officially named Broken Age. Schafer has noted that he has tried to convince publishers to fund adventure games since the decline of the genre, but was always turned away.

The two groups set a goal of $400,000 for the combined effort, considering $300,000 for the video game development and the rest for the documentary. Within the day of its announcement, the project surpassed the goal, and by the end of the month-long effort, had raised more than $3 million; Schafer noted that this amount surpassed the total budgets that his previous titles at LucasArts had been developed for. With the additional funds, Double Fine committed to developing the game for a wider range of platforms, localizations, and creating fully voiced dialog for the English version.

The success of the Double Fine Adventure Kickstarter is said to be attributable to several factors. First, Schafer and Double Fine have an established reputation with video games players, specifically through Schafer's reputation for humorous adventure games, and Double Fine's previous fan-favorite title Psychonauts.

=== Expansion ===
Following on the success of the Double Fine Adventure, several other small developers saw the potential of Kickstarter to launch new projects. Prior to Double Fine Adventure, Kickstarter had reported about 100 new video game-related projects started each month, a number that more than doubled after February; further, dollars pledged to these projects went from around $200,000 per month to between $4 and $10 million in the months that followed Adventure.

Some of these projects were based on the revival of fan-favorite intellectual properties:

- Wasteland 2 was announced as a Kickstarter project to develop a sequel to the 1988 role-playing video game Wasteland, a spiritual predecessor to the Fallout series. The effort was backed by several of the game's original developers now under the development company inXile Entertainment. It successfully raised more than $2.9 million from an initial goal of $1 million, allowing them to co-develop the game with members from Obsidian Entertainment, who recently had developed Fallout: New Vegas.
- Al Lowe, the creator of the Leisure Suit Larry series, successfully raised more than $650,000 in funds via Kickstarter to offer a high-definition remake of the 1987 Leisure Suit Larry in the Land of the Lounge Lizards.
- In late 2012, Charles Cecil and Revolution Software decided to partially crowd-fund the fifth installment in the classic adventure game series Broken Sword, titled Broken Sword: The Serpent's Curse, raising $771,000 on Kickstarter and over $823,000 along with PayPal pledges, while the original goal was only $400,000. The achieved stretch-goals meant a longer, more ambitious, more free-world game with extra content.
- Big Finish Games secured more than $540,000 in Kickstarter funding to create a new game in the Tex Murphy adventure game series, tentatively named Project Fedora before being officially titled as Tesla Effect: A Tex Murphy Adventure.
- Hidden Path Entertainment, though working on Counter-Strike: Global Offensive, wanted to offer a sequel to their game Defense Grid: The Awakening, a project they could not get traditional funding for. They turned to Kickstarter with a revised formula in stretch goals, aiming to raise $1 million for a full sequel to Defense Grid but offering to extend the original game with each intermediate $250,000 goal, such as providing additional levels or a level editor. They also worked with video card manufacturers to provide rewards for the higher funding tiers as part of the incentives for the Kickstarter.
- Also in 2012, Chris Roberts, with previous experience developing space combat simulation titles such as Wing Commander and Freelancer, launched a Kickstarter campaign to start development on a new space simulation game, Star Citizen. The Kickstarter campaign for the game raised over $2.1 million in the month that it was active, surpassing the goal of $500,000. Once the Kickstarter campaign was complete, Roberts launched a website to continue the crowdfunding campaign and to begin tracking the development progress, so far raising a total of $80 million as of May 2015. The game was anticipated for release in mid- to late 2016, with various "module" releases before then.
- The 2019 video game Piposh is a reboot of the 1999-2003 Israeli video gaming franchise, with the campaigning aiming to bring legitimacy back to a flailing local industry.

By March 2017, Kickstarter reported that 10,000 video-game related projects had been successfully funded through their site, cumulative bringing in $613 million of funding.

=== Ouya game console ===
In the limelight of the success of using Kickstarter for video game software, a company composed of video game hardware experts initiated a Kickstarter to raise money to fund the development of the Ouya video game console; the console is targeted to be a low-cost, Android-based unit with an open development structure, allowing it to take advantage of the existing games in the mobile space. The Kickstarter began on July 10, 2012, looking to raise $950,000 for turning their existing prototype into a manufactured line; within 8 hours they had cleared this number, and within a week had surpassed $4 million in funding.

=== Video game-specific crowdfunding ===
With numerous successful video game projects arising from Kickstarter, other crowdfunding sites have arisen with a specific focus on video games.

Gamesplanet Lab offers a framework for crowdfunding, but becomes more involved in the pre-selection of projects that qualify for its site, and provides services to help assure the quality of successful projects as delivered.

Gambitious is an equity crowdfunding mechanism, where those that invest in an offered project can receive dividends for the project successfully meeting its publication goals.

=== Hybrid crowd funding ===
More recently, Kickstarter and other crowd funding services have been used by developers who have gained potential financial commitment from investors, and use the crowd funding mechanism to demonstrate the potential demand for the video game. Such examples include Bloodstained: Ritual of the Night, which successfully sought at least $500,000 in crowd funding to secure 90% of the development funds from investors, and Shenmue III which also obtained the required funding through Kickstarter to gain financial and development help from Sony for publishing the game to the PlayStation 4.

Brian Fargo of inXile Entertainment, Feargus Urquhart of Obsidian Entertainment, and Tim Schafer of Double Fine Productions, all whom have had significantly large crowdfunded projects as listed above, helped to found Fig in August 2015, a video game-centric crowdfunding platform that, in addition to the typical backer funding, also enables development investment so that they can earn part of the game's profit on release.

=== Other arenas ===
Electronic Arts announced support for crowd-funded video games by offering free distribution of these games on their Origin software delivery service for personal computers. Borrowing from the reward structure of the crowdfunding model, Namco Bandai has announced an incentives plan for their upcoming game, Ni no Kuni, that the rewards for those that pre-order the game will improve with the number of pre-orders that are received.

== Reaction ==
In 2012, 43% of game projects (including tabletop games) on Kickstarter successfully completed their funding, which was slightly above the average success rate for all projects on the platform during that year. According to Kickstarter's 2012 statistics, more than 900 of about 2,800 video game-related projects were funded during 2012. Games (including tabletop games) were Kickstarter's most popular and successful category in 2012; successful gaming projects generated over $83M in funding across 1.38M pledges. Despite reports of "Kickstarter fatigue" - a sense of community apathy towards the platform, Kickstarter revealed that as of August 1, 2013, $64.7M had been pledged towards games project that year, showing growth over 2012 figures. In March 2014, Kickstarter announced it had achieved over $1 billion in pledges, with more than $215 million of that dedicated for video gaming and tabletop gaming projects. By mid-2016, Kickstarter reported over $186 million in video game-related pledges with over $500 million for all game-related projects.

== Backer motivations ==
A survey conducted by a research team at the University of Cologne examined the motivations of Kickstarter backers who pledged for video game projects in 2014. It found that the prime motive of a vast majority of respondents was to encourage creation of games in genres the backers perceived as under-supplied, and warned game developers against "following the bandwagon" by trying to fill the niches that have already been saturated by earlier crowdfunded projects. Beyond that, the study grouped backers into three categories, based on other motivations they displayed (from most to least numerous):

- "Supporters" were driven by the desire to help a particular video game developer produce games without external constraints.
- "Buyers" were mainly interested in receiving finished games.
- "Influencers" saw crowdfunding as a way to affect change within the video game industry as a whole.

Both "supporters" and "influencers" perceived video game developers as being "strangled" by the established conventions of the industry and the mainstream market (such as video game publishers), and while most backers wanted to be kept up to date about the development and features of the games they backed, few were interested in directly influencing them. The researchers concluded that "backers are first and foremost consumers, and the main effect of reward-based crowdfunding is that it closes the information gap between the developer and the customer."

The study also examined what influenced a backer's decision to pledge more or less money to a particular project, and found that "supporters" generally tend to pledge smaller amounts of money to fewer projects than both "buyers" and "influencers". It identified three factors that influenced the pledged amount:

- Overlap between the backer's perception of a particular project and their personal investment preference. If the backer believed that backing a project was in line with their general investment motivation (reflected by one of three categories above), they would pledge more money to it.
- Trust between the developer and their backers. The survey responders did not differentiate between competence-based trust (whether the developer can produce a high-quality game) and trust in the developer's integrity (whether they will put all the resources they received into making it). Furthermore, trust was only a factor if the deviations between the project and the backer's investment preferences (see above) were minimal; otherwise, it was irrelevant.
- The funding goal. The study found a correlation between higher project goals and higher pledges, but abstained from making any conclusions about it, citing unaccounted for external factors, to be examined in later studies.

Crowd funding also allow supporters get more valuable open source games with public domain, GPL, MIT, or Apache license, they can reuse for make new games and remixes, modifications, hacks. Since crowd pay for development, no need hide source code or have copyright against supporters.

== Crowdfunding risks ==
There are risks of such crowd-funded games, including the inability to complete the funding successfully. In one example, the development of the game Alpha Colony fell short of its $50,000 goal by $28, rendering the project unfunded as per Kickstarter's regulations. In other cases, the delivery of the product after a successful fundraising campaign may be left unfulfilled. A notable case is that of Code Hero, which had secured $170,000 during its Kickstarter in early 2012, had initially expected to be shown at the August 2012 PAX convention but failed to materialize. Further lack of updates through December led some of the Kickstarter backers to investigate the state of the project, finding that Primer Labs had apparently used up the funding and had yet to finish the game. Primer Labs' Alex Peake had stated that they are looking for more investments to continue developing the game and still commits to releasing the game in the future. However, due to lack of communication and failure to provide any of the claimed rewards, backers are looking towards legal options to recover their funding, though are limited by some of the terms of agreements set in place by Kickstarter. An update in early February 2013 included a message from Peake, breaking down the use of the Kickstarter funds and promise to provide refunds and back pay to his developers once the game was released, and took responsibility for the failure to meet the stated goals. The game hasn't been released.

Another example of such risks is Godus, a god game developed by 22cans, with the genre's pioneer Peter Molyneux at the lead. The game was successfully funded in a 2012 Kickstarter campaign for about $800,000, and the team delivered a mobile version for iOS systems, and a Windows version that was developed through Steam's Early Access program. However, in early 2015, many supporters began to doubt if 22cans was going to finish the title and complete the additional Kickstarter stretch goals such as a Linux version, as Molyneux had begun talking about the next game his studio would produce. In response, Molyneux stated that they were moving on from Godus and turned over most of the development to one of the campaign's backers while Molyneux and 22cans will still provide overarching guidance. Supporters expressed concern in that they had bought into the Kickstarter based on Molyneux's creditials towards the god game genre, and as such the final game may not reflect the product they actually had expected.

== See also ==
- List of video game crowdfunding projects
