= Interfilm =

Interfilm, Inc.
- Industry: Motion pictures, Entertainment
- Headquarters: United States
- Key people: Bob Bejan
- Products: Interactive films

Interfilm was an American film production company founded by Bob Bejan in 1992 that produced interactive films.

== History ==
In August 1993, Interfilm Inc. filed an initial offering of two million common shares with the U.S. Securities and Exchange Commission. Interfilm said in the filing it changed its name from Ediflex Systems Inc. on Aug. 24 and that it has agreed to acquire Interfilm Technologies Inc. prior to the initial offering. That same year, Interfilm signed a three picture deal with Sony Pictures Entertainment. Sony Pictures also purchased 10 Interfilm systems for installation in their Lowes Cineplexes bringing the total value of the deal to $6 million. The company went public in early December 1993 which resulted in $20 million of capitalization. In 1995, following disappointing audience responses to Interfilm's feature Ride for Your Life production was suspended by Sony on the film Bombmeister and was ultimately never completed. Interfilm subsequently announced intent to sue Sony for breach of contract. The suit against Sony was dismissed in 1998 Interfilm's commercial failure is credited with diminishing interest in interactive films for several years thereafter.

== Productions ==
- I'm Your Man (1992)
- Mr. Payback: An Interactive Movie (1995)
- Ride for Your Life (1995)
- Bombmeister (unreleased)

== Reception ==
Outside of the novelty of the interactive nature of the films, aspects such as the writing, acting, and production values were noted to be of poor quality. Critical reception was also dismal with Roger Ebert of the Chicago Sun Times giving Mr. Payback a half-star out of a possible four, and called it "the kind of film where horrified parents might encourage the kids to shout at the screen, hoping the noise might drown out the flood of garbage." He and Gene Siskel both commented that while the concept of combining film with interactivity has possibilities, they are not explored by Mr. Payback, which centers on bathroom humor and appeals to the audience's most sadistic urges.
