= Interactive film =

Interactive media genre

An interactive film (also known as interactive drama) is a video game or other interactive media that has characteristics of a cinematic film. In the video game industry, the term refers to a movie game, a video game that presents its gameplay in a cinematic, scripted manner, often through the use of full-motion video of either animated or live-action footage.

In the film industry, the term "interactive film" refers to interactive cinema, a film where one or more viewers can interact with the film and influence the events that unfold in the film.

== Design ==
This genre came about with the invention of LaserDiscs and LaserDisc players, the first nonlinear or random access video play devices. The fact that a LaserDisc player could jump to and play any chapter instantaneously (rather than proceed in a linear path from start to finish like videotape) meant that games with branching plotlines could be constructed from out-of-order video chapters, in much the same way as Choose Your Own Adventure books are constructed from out-of-order pages.

Thus, interactive movies were animated or filmed with real actors like movies (or in some later cases, rendered with 3D models) and followed a main storyline. Alternative scenes were filmed to be triggered after wrong (or alternate allowable) actions of the player (such as 'Game Over' scenes).

A popular example of a commercial interactive movie was the 1983 arcade game Dragon's Lair, featuring an animated full motion video (FMV) by ex-Disney animator Don Bluth, where the player controlled some of the moves of the main character. When in danger, the player was to decide which move, action, or combination to choose. If they chose the wrong move, they would see a 'lose a life' scene, until they found the correct one which would allow them to see the rest of the story. There was only one possible successful storyline in Dragon's Lair; the only activity the user had was to choose or guess the move the designers intended them to make. Despite the lack of choice, Dragon's Lair was very popular.

The hardware for these games consisted of a LaserDisc player linked to a processor configured with interface software that assigned a jump-to-chapter function to each of the controller buttons at each decision point. Much as a Choose Your Own Adventure book might say "If you turn left, go to page 7. If you turn right, go to page 8", the controller for Dragon's Lair or Cliff Hanger was programmed to go to the next chapter in the successful story if a player activated the correct control, or to go to the death chapter if they activated the wrong one. Because LaserDisc players of the day were not robust enough to handle the wear and tear of constant arcade use, they required frequent replacement. The LaserDiscs that contained the footage were ordinary LaserDiscs with nothing special about them save for the order of their chapters and, if removed from the arcade console, would play their video on standard, non-interactive LaserDisc players.

Later advances in technology allowed interactive movies to overlay multiple fields of FMV, called "vites", in much the same way as polygonal models and sprites are overlaid on top of backgrounds in traditional video game graphics.

== Origins ==
The earliest rudimentary examples of mechanical interactive cinematic games date back to the early 20th century, with "cinematic shooting gallery" games in the United Kingdom. They were similar to shooting gallery carnival games, except that players shot at a cinema screen displaying film footage of targets. They showed footage of targets, and when a player shot the screen at the right time, it would trigger a mechanism that temporarily pauses the film and registers a point. The first successful example of such a game was Life Targets, released in the UK in 1912. Cinematic shooting gallery games enjoyed short-lived popularity in several parts of Britain during the 1910s, and often had safari animals as targets, with footage recorded from British imperial colonies. Cinematic shooting gallery games declined some time after the 1910s.

Capitol Projector's 1954 arcade electro-mechanical game machine Auto Test was a driving test simulation that used a film reel video projector to display pre-recorded driving video footage, awarding the player points for making correct decisions as the footage is played. It was not intended to be cinematic or a racing game, but was a driving simulation designed for educational purposes.

An early example of interactive cinema was the 1967 film Kinoautomat, which was written and directed by Radúz Činčera. This movie was first screened at Expo '67 in Montreal. This film was produced before the invention of the LaserDisc or similar technology, so a live moderator appeared on stage at certain points to ask the audience to choose between two scenes. The chosen scene would play following an audience vote.

An early example of an interactive movie game was Nintendo's Wild Gunman, a 1974 electro-mechanical arcade game that used a pair of 16mm film projectors to display live-action full-motion video (FMV) footage of Wild West gunslingers that the player could shoot and kill with a light gun. In 1979, Kasco (Kansei Seiki Seisakusho) released The Driver, a hit electro-mechanical arcade game with live-action 16mm film projection of a car chase filmed by Toei.

In 1975, Nintendo's EVR Race was a horse race betting arcade game that used Electronic Video Recording (EVR) technology to playback video footage of horse races from a video tape. Before each race, players would place bets on each horse, with the machine dispensing medals (tokens) to any player that successfully chose the winning horse. EVR Race was Japan's highest-grossing medal game for three years in a row, from 1976 to 1978. Another horse race betting game, Electro-Sport's Quarter Horse (1982), was the first arcade game to utilize a LaserDisc player, and operated in the same manner as EVR Race, with the LaserDisc being used to play back pre-recorded non-interactive video footage of horse races; Gameplay was limited to the player placing bets before the race.

An early attempt to combine random access video with computer games was Rollercoaster, written in BASIC for the Apple II by David Lubar for David H. Ahl, editor of Creative Computing. This was a text adventure that could trigger a LaserDisc player to play portions of the 1977 American feature film Rollercoaster. The program was conceived and written in 1981, and it was published in the January 1982 issue of Creative Computing along with an article by Lubar detailing its creation, an article by Ahl claiming that Rollercoaster was the first video/computer game hybrid and proposing a theory of video/computer interactivity, and other articles reviewing hardware necessary to run the game and do further experiments.

== Specialized hardware formats ==
=== LaserDisc games ===
A LaserDisc game is a video game that uses pre-recorded video (either live-action or animation) played from a LaserDisc, either as the entirety of the graphics or as part of the graphics. The first major arcade LaserDisc video game was Sega's Astron Belt, a third-person space combat rail shooter featuring live-action full-motion video footage (largely borrowed from a Japanese science fiction film) over which the player/enemy ships and laser fire are superimposed. Developed in 1982, it was unveiled at the September 1982 Amusement Machine Show (AM Show) in Tokyo and the November 1982 AMOA show in Chicago, and was then released in Japan in March 1983. However, its release in the United States was delayed due to several hardware and software bugs, by which time other LaserDisc games had beaten it to public release there.

The next LaserDisc game to be announced was Data East's video game adaptation of the Japanese anime film Genma Taisen (1983), introduced in March 1983, with the game released internationally in June 1983. It introduced a new approach to video game storytelling: using brief full-motion video cutscenes to develop a story between the game's shooting stages; years later, this would become the standard approach to video game storytelling. Bega's Battle also featured a branching storyline.

In the United States, the game that popularized the genre was Dragon's Lair, animated by Don Bluth and released by Cinematronics. Released in June 1983, it was the first LaserDisc game released in the United States. It contained animated scenes, much like a cartoon. The scenes would be played back and at certain points during playback the player would have to press a specific direction on the joystick or the button to advance the game to the next scene, like a quick time event. For instance, a scene begins with the hero, a knight named Dirk, falling through a hole in a drawbridge and being attacked by tentacles. If the player presses the button at this point, Dirk fends off the tentacles with his sword and pulls himself back up out of the hole. If the player fails to press the sword button at the right time, or instead presses a direction on the joystick, Dirk is attacked by the tentacles and crushed. Each unsuccessful move, however, would produce a few moments of black screen, when the LaserDisc switched to the scene showing the death of the character, which interrupted the continuous flow of gameplay found in other video game graphic systems of the time; this was a common criticism of some players and critics.

There were generally two styles of LaserDisc games that emerged. Those that followed the lead of Astron Belt integrated pre-recorded LaserDisc video with real-time computer graphics and gameplay, making them more like traditional interactive video games. Those that followed the lead of Dragon's Lair integrated animated cartoon LaserDisc video with quick time events, making them more like interactive cartoons. The latter style of LaserDisc games were generally more successful than the former.

==== Real-time gameplay ====
Among those that followed the lead of Astron Belt, combining pre-recorded video with real-time computer graphics and gameplay, several were introduced at Tokyo's AM Show in September 1983, with its successor Star Blazer unanimously hailed as the "strongest" LaserDisc game of the show. Other games at the show included Funai's Interstellar, a forward-scrolling third-person rail shooter that used pre-rendered 3D computer graphics for the LaserDisc video backgrounds and real-time 2D computer graphics for the ships. Cube Quest, introduced at the same AM Show in Tokyo, was a vertical scrolling shooter that used pre-rendered computer animation for the LaserDisc video backgrounds and real-time 3D computer graphics for the ships. Later that year, Gottlieb's M.A.C.H. 3 was a vertical scrolling shooter game that combined live-action LaserDisc video backgrounds with 2D computer graphics for the ships.

The Firefox (1984) arcade game included a Philips LaserDisc player to combine live action video and sound from the Firefox film with computer generated graphics and sound. The game - a rail shooter - used a LaserDisc containing multiple clips stored in very short, interleaved segments on the disc. The player would seek the short distance to the next segment of a clip during the vertical retrace interval by adjusting the tracking mirror, allowing perfectly continuous video even as the player switched clips under control of the game's computer. This clip-switching method was used to allow the game to randomise the placement and timing of the enemy aircraft - which were part of the LaserDisc footage - as well as to show them exploding seamlessly wherever the player managed to hit them, as opposed to other LaserDisc games, which would have enemies appear at the same predetermined place and moment every time. However, this method was notorious for being extremely strenuous on the player and frequently led to the machines breaking, slightly hindering the appeal of LaserDisc arcade games.

In the 1990s, American Laser Games produced a wide variety of live-action light gun LaserDisc video games, which played much like the early LaserDisc games, but used a light gun instead of a joystick to affect the action.

==== Quick-time events ====
Among those that followed the lead of Dragon's Lair, progressing pre-recorded video with quick time events, was its successor Space Ace, another Don Bluth animated game released by Cinematronics later the same year. It featured "branching paths" in which there were multiple "correct moves" at certain points in the animation, and the move the player chose would affect the order of later scenes.

The success of Dragon's Lair spawned a number of sequels and similar laserdisc cartoon games incorporating quick time events. However, original animation production was expensive. To cut costs, several companies simply hacked together scenes from Japanese anime that were obscure to American audiences of the day. One such example was Stern's Cliff Hanger (1983), which used footage from the Lupin III movies Castle of Cagliostro (directed by Hayao Miyazaki) and Mystery of Mamo, both originally animated by TMS Entertainment. Anime-based LaserDisc games helped expose many Americans in the 1980s to Japanese anime, particularly Cliff Hanger which exposed many Americans to Lupin III and Hayao Miyazaki before any Lupin or Miyazaki anime productions had officially been released theatrically or on home video in the United States.

In 1984, Super Don Quix-ote, Esh's Aurunmilla and Ninja Hayate overlaid crude computer graphics on top of the animation to indicate the correct input to the player for quick time event scenes, which the 1985 games Time Gal and Road Blaster also featured. Time Gal also added a time-stopping feature, where specific moments in the game involve Reika stopping time; during these moments, players are presented with a list of three options and have seven seconds to choose the one which will save the character. Another example of an arcade LaserDisc game using a similar style would be Badlands.

==== Decline ====
After LaserDisc arcade fever had peaked in 1983, the LaserDisc arcade market declined in 1984. While there were some LaserDisc arcade hits that year, such as Space Ace and Cobra Command, they were not able to achieve the same level of mainstream success as earlier LaserDisc games the previous year. Following the end of the golden age of arcade video games, there were high expectations for LaserDisc games to revive the arcade industry, but LaserDisc games failed to live up to those expectations. Instead, the arcade market was being reinvigorated by sports video games such as Karate Champ, Track & Field, Punch-Out and several Nintendo VS. System titles.

=== VHS and CD-ROM ===
The 1985 release Clue VCR Mystery Game paired a live-action VHS video with cards and a notepad, introducing a "new type of gaming altogether".

The video game console Control-Vision (codenamed NEMO) was prototyped in 1986, using VHS tapes to present film-like gaming experiences. Before Hasbro ended its investment in the project, video footage for the game Night Trap was recorded in 1987. Some Control-Vision content survived into more advanced platforms, including the port of Night Trap for the Sega CD platform in 1992.

Epyx announced three VCR games in 1988 that combined videotape footage with a board game, including one based on its computer release California Games. Beginning in 1989, American Laser Games started to produce a wide variety of live-action light gun LaserDisc games, which played much like the early cartoon games, but used a light gun instead of a joystick to affect the action. Founded in 1991, Digital Pictures began producing a variety of interactive movies for home consoles.

With CD-ROMs embedded in home consoles and home computers by the mid-1990s, interactive movie games with live-action and full-motion video featuring actors became cutting-edge. Some notable adventure games from this era include Under a Killing Moon, The Pandora Directive (both part of the Tex Murphy series), The Beast Within: A Gabriel Knight Mystery, Voyeur, Star Trek: Klingon, Star Trek: Borg, Ripper, Snatcher, Black Dahlia, The X-Files Game, Phantasmagoria, Bad Day on the Midway and The Dark Eye. Others in the action genre are Brain Dead 13 and Star Wars: Rebel Assault.

Due to the limitation of memory and disk space, as well as the lengthy timeframes and high costs required for the production, not many variations and alternative scenes for possible player moves were filmed, restricting the variety of gameplay.

=== DVD games ===
A DVD game (sometimes called DVDi, "DVD interactive") is a standalone game that can be played on a set-top DVD player. The game takes advantage of technology built into the DVD format to create an interactive gaming environment compatible with most DVD players without requiring additional hardware. DVD TV games were first developed in the late 1990s. They were poorly received and understood as an entertainment medium. However, DVD-based game consoles like the PlayStation 2 popularized DVD-based gaming and also functioned as a DVD video player. In addition, the format has been used to import some video games to the DVD format, allowing them to be played with a standard DVD player rather than requiring a PC. Examples include Dragon's Lair and Who Shot Johnny Rock?. The PC/console game Tomb Raider: The Angel of Darkness was released in 2006 as a DVD game entitled Tomb Raider: The Action Adventure. Japanese games such as visual novels and eroge that were originally made for PC are commonly ported to DVDPG (a term that stands for DVD Players Game). Instead of standard save methods, DVDPGs use password save systems. Similar game types include BDPG (Blu-ray Disc Players Game) and UMDPG (Universal Media Disc Players Game).

From the time of its original introduction, the DVD format specification has included the ability to use an ordinary DVD player to play interactive games, such as Dragon's Lair (which was reissued on DVD), the Scene It? and other series of DVD games, or games that are included as bonus material on movie DVDs. Aftermath Media (founded by Rob Landeros of Trilobyte) released the interactive movies Tender Loving Care and Point of View (P.O.V) for the DVD platform. Such games have appeared on DVDs aimed at younger target audiences, such as the special features discs of the Harry Potter film series.

=== Live interactive movies ===
The world's first live interactive movie was My One Demand filmed and premiered on 25 June 2015. Created by Blast Theory, the film was streamed live to the TIFF Lightbox on three successive nights. The cast of eight included Julian Richings and Clare Coulter. Audiences in the cinema used mobile phones to answer questions from the narrator, played by Maggie Huculak and their answers were included in the voiceover as well as in the closing credits.

== Modern developments ==
Later video games used this approach using fully animated computer-generated scenes, including various adventure games such as the Sound Novel series by Chunsoft, Shenmue series by Sega, Shadow of Memories by Konami, Time Travelers by Level 5, and Fahrenheit by Quantic Dream. During many scenes, the player has limited control of the character and chooses certain actions to progress the story. Other scenes are quick time event action sequences, requiring the player to hit appropriate buttons at the right time to succeed. Some of these games, such as the Sound Novel series, Shadow of Memories, Time Travelers, Until Dawn, Heavy Rain, Beyond: Two Souls and Detroit: Become Human, have numerous branching storylines that result from what actions the player takes or fails to complete properly, which can include the death of major characters or failure to solve the mystery.

Cast members' work during the 1990s on interactive movies' chroma key sets was different from traditional filmmaking: They performed multiple possible actions players choose in a game, usually looked into the camera to react to the player, and usually did not react to others on the set. Such products were popular during the early 1990s as CD-ROMs and LaserDiscs made their way into the living rooms, providing an alternative to the low-capacity cartridges of most consoles. As the first CD-based consoles capable of displaying smooth and textured 3D graphics appeared, the full-FMV game had vanished from the mainstream circles around 1995, although it remained an option for PC adventure games for a couple more years. One of the last titles released was the 1998 PC and PlayStation adventure The X-Files: The Game, packed in 7 CDs. That same year, Tex Murphy: Overseer became the first game developed specifically for DVD-ROM and one of the last "interactive movies" to make heavy use of live-action FMV. In 2014, the Tex Murphy series continued with a new FMV game, Tesla Effect: A Tex Murphy Adventure.

With advances in computer technology, interactive films waned as more developers used fully digitized characters and scenes. This format was popularized by Telltale Games, achieving success in The Walking Dead series, where player actions can drastically change future games, for example, different characters may be alive in the end depending on choices made by the player in The Walking Dead: Season One, but those same characters affect The Walking Dead: Season Two. Other examples of episodic adventure games include Telltale's The Wolf Among Us series and the Life Is Strange series, created by Dontnod Entertainment.

=== David Cage: video games referred to as interactive films ===
Heavy Rain logo

At its release, Heavy Rain (a 2010 video game by Quantic Dream) received very positive reviews and won several gaming and film and television awards. What is most striking, however, is the unanimity of critics in defining it an interactive-film more than a video game. This definition is certainly inspired by the phenomenon, typical of the Nineties, of films available in home video or computer that presented to the viewer a series of pre-recorded sequences, at the end of which it was possible to make choices that directly influenced the direction of the story. David Cage, head of Quantic Dream, defines his Heavy Rain as an interactive film and, in fact, the goal of the video game coincides with the type of film just mentioned; to combine the interactive potential of the video game with the expressive richness of cinema. However, unlike its predecessors, Cage chooses not to work with live action, but to use only synthetic images, avoiding, at least in part, the effect of estrangement typical of interactive films in the passage from moments of exploration to sequences of narrative exposure. From the interactive films on DVD Cage assimilates two different aspects in his videogames, respectively the use of quick time events (QTE) and the freedom of choice left to the player to determine the development of the plot. In the gameplay of Heavy Rain, however, QTEs are not used solely for the purpose of succeeding in certain actions but also as a vehicle to perform the countless narrative choices placed on the player. In the first case the player finds himself testing his reflexes by pressing the keys that appear on the screen. In the second case, up to four different keys can appear to be pressed, each of the which represents a choice that affects the narrative of the video game. As for non-interactive phases, it is difficult to distinguish from the interactive phases, as what can appear as a simple cutscene can often hide several QTEs. Regarding identification with the main characters; Heavy Rain removes each element of the challenge typical of graphic adventures is removed to ensure that the player can be fully focused on it. Also, as already stated, in Heavy Rain there is no game over: depending on the player's actions and choices, the video game shifts to different storylines, culminating in one of the many endings planned for the story. The identification with the characters is not given only by the type of actions that we are asked to perform but also by how, at game design level, the player is required to complete QTEs that aim to make the player feel the physical effort of the playable character. In an interview, director Cage stated that the game was designed with a focus on physical immersion by letting the player control the animation of the character with the right analog stick. The idea behind this is to put the player further in the same physical space as that of the character. Although the innovation given by this type of mechanics in the gameplay is undoubted, interaction remains a very small part of the experience offered by David Cage's titles; the relationship between gameplay and cutscenes in Cage's works is broken by what we could define as the insertion of the first into the second creating interactive cutscenes.

Another example comes from Quantum Break, published by Remedy in 2016. Between the game's acts, episodes from a TV show filmed in live action are displayed to the player: the scenes in these episodes change conforming to the decisions the player has taken and the objects he has interacted with. The looks of the characters are maintained between the live action sequences and the 3D computer generated ones, thanks to the use of the motion capture technique.

=== Interactive films in the internet era ===
With the advent of YouTube annotations in 2008, a series of five Interactive Adventures were created by Chad, Matt & Rob that utilized the annotations to tell interactive stories that allowed the user to guide the narrative. The series included The Time Machine, The Murder, The Birthday Party, The Teleporter, and The Treasure Hunt. Annotations were removed from YouTube in 2019, which makes many of these videos unable to be interacted with.

In the 2010s, streaming services like Netflix started to grow in popularity and sophistication. By 2016, Netflix had started experimenting with interactive works aimed at children, including an animated version of Puss in Boots and an adaption of Telltale's Minecraft: Story Mode. Netflix's first major interactive film with live-action scenes was Black Mirror: Bandersnatch, a film in the Black Mirror anthology series and released in December 2018. Netflix worked with Black Mirror's creator Charlie Brooker to develop a narrative that took advantage of the interactive format, while developing their own tools to improve caching of scenes and management of the film's progression to use on future projects. In 2020 Netflix released an interactive television special of the long-standing Carmen Sandiego interactive media with Carmen Sandiego: To Steal or Not to Steal. In 2022, another interactive short released by Netflix, called Cat Burglar, which is an interactive trivia cartoon, where the viewer plays a cat burglar named Rowdy who is trying to steal a valuable artwork from a museum which is being protected by security guard dog named Peanut and must answer the correct questions in order to progress through the story.

== Reception ==
Although interactive movies had a filmic quality that sprite-based games could not duplicate at the time, they were a niche market— the limited amount of direct interactivity put off many gamers. The popularity of FMV games declined during 1995, as real-time 3D graphics gained increasing attention. The negative response to FMV-based games was so common that it was even acknowledged in game marketing; a print advertisement for the interactive movie Psychic Detective stated, "Yeah, we know full-motion video games in the past sucked."

Cost was also an issue, as live action video with decent production values is expensive to film, while video shot on a low budget damages the overall image of the game. Ground Zero: Texas cost Sega around US$3 million, about the same as a low-budget movie would cost in 1994.

Though not as crucial an issue as the limited interactivity, another issue that drew criticism was the quality of the video itself. While the video was often relatively smooth, it was not actually full-motion as it was not of 24 frames per second or higher. In addition to this, the hardware it was displayed on, particularly in the case of the Sega CD, had a limited color palette (of which a maximum of 64 colors were displayable simultaneously), resulting in notably inferior image quality due to the requirement of dithering. Game designer Chris Crawford disparages the concept of interactive movies, except those aimed at elementary-school-age children, in his book Chris Crawford on Game Design. He writes that since the player must process what is known and explore the options, choosing a path at a branch-point is every bit as demanding as making a decision in a conventional game, but with much less reward since the result can only be one of a small number of branches.

Defenders of the genre have argued that, by allowing the player to interact with real people rather than animated characters, interactive full-motion video can produce emotional and visceral reactions that are not possible with either movies or traditional video games.

== Other uses ==
Some studios hybridized ordinary computer game play with interactive movie play; the earliest examples of this were the entries in the Origin Systems Wing Commander series starting with Wing Commander III: Heart of the Tiger. Between combat missions, Wing Commander III featured cutscenes with live actors; the game offered limited storyline branching based on whether missions were won or lost and on choices made at decision points during the cutscenes (Wing Commander IV: The Price of Freedom, with some of the same actors, was similar).

Other games like BioForge would, perhaps erroneously, use the term for a game that has rich action and plot of cinematic proportions—but, in terms of gameplay, has no relation to FMV movies.

The term is an ambiguous one since many video games follow a storyline similar to the way movies would. Games that highlight a linear story at the cost of the player's freedom may be better described as story-dominant games. This is also the case of videogames that offer long and detailed cutscenes with a cinematographic aesthetic, as seen in Hideo Kojima's Death Stranding released in 2019, which critics described as a videogame movie or interactive film; in this example, the player's actions have no direct consequence in the storyline, and the interaction is limited to the field of the gameplay.

== See also ==
- Web documentary
- List of interactive films
- Interactive video
- Interactive art
- Art game
- Interactive Adventures
- Chad, Matt & Rob
- Cheer screening
- Pioneer LaserActive
- Halcyon Game System
- AnimePlay
