= Tex Murphy: Overseer =

1998 video game

- Developer: Access Software
- Publishers: NA: Access Software; EU: Eidos Interactive
- Director: Adrian Carr
- Producers: Aaron Conners; Catrine McGregor; Bruce Ward
- Designers: Aaron Conners; Chris Jones
- Programmer: Mark Knight
- Writers: Aaron Conners; Chris Jones
- Series: Tex Murphy
- Platform: Windows
- Release: NA: February 25, 1998; EU: 1998
- Genre: Adventure
- Mode: Single-player

Tex Murphy: Overseer is the fifth installment in the Tex Murphy series of graphic adventure games produced by Access Software. In it, the player controls Private Investigator Tex Murphy as he recounts the story of his first case to his girlfriend, Chelsee Bando. Like the previous two Tex Murphy games, Under a Killing Moon and The Pandora Directive, Overseer combined the use of full motion video (FMV) with 3D environments.

== Plot ==
Like all Tex Murphy games, Tex Murphy: Overseer takes place in post-World War III San Francisco. After the devastating events of WWIII, many major cities have been rebuilt (as is the case with New San Francisco), though certain areas still remain as they were before the war (as in Old San Francisco). WWIII also left another mark on the world: the formation of two classes of citizens. Specifically, the Mutants and the "Norms".

Since the game is told as a series of flashbacks, it actually takes place in two different time frames. The current year is 2043, shortly after the events of The Pandora Directive and as such tensions between the Mutants and Norms have begun to die down. However, the flashbacks take place in November 2037. The Crusade for Genetic Purity is beginning to gain momentum, and tensions are building between the two groups. The Mutants are usually forced to live in the run-down areas of cities such as Old San Francisco. Tex lives in his new apartment on Front St. in New San Francisco. He has just been kicked out of the Colonel's Detective Agency for reporting the Colonel's unethical practices, and has now gone into business on his own.

The game starts out with Tex going on a date with Chelsee Bando. Worrying about Tex's ability to commit to a relationship, she confronts him about how he still wears his wedding ring from his ex-wife, Sylvia Linsky. This leads Tex to recount the story of his first case. Tex is hired by Sylvia Linsky to discover the truth behind her father's suicide. She believes he was actually murdered, but the police have already closed the case. With no one else to turn to, she goes to Tex for help. Tex becomes involved in a plot involving implants and mind control, and must do what he can to stop it, before it's too late. The story which Tex recounts to Chelsee is essentially the events of Mean Streets, the first game in the series. There are, however, several notable plot differences between the two.

== Gameplay ==
Exploring in the 3D environment

Tex Murphy: Overseer is the third game in the Tex Murphy series to use virtual world technology. For Overseer, Access Software created a new virtual world engine designed for use in Windows 95/98. Along with the new engine came a slightly modified control system. The virtual world still allowed for full freedom of movement and allowed the user to search for clues in every corner, which by this point had become a staple of the Tex series.

Overseer continued the use of the Tex Murphy series' unique method of dialogue selection. Instead of providing the players with a list of responses showing the exact words that Tex will say, each dialogue choice is given an adequate description. Never knowing exactly what Tex will say when the players select an option helps to keep the dialogue surprising, and often funny.

The game has two difficulty settings: Entertainment mode and Gamer mode. On Entertainment mode, hints are available and the players can bypass certain puzzles in the game. A total of 1,500 points are available on Entertainment mode. In Gamer mode, no hints are available and puzzles cannot be bypassed, but the players receive bonus points when solving certain puzzles within a set amount of time. A total of 4,000 points are available on Gamer mode, though due to a glitch with one puzzle, only 3,900 of these points are actually attainable. Unlike its predecessor, The Pandora Directive, Overseer didn't have any other changes to gameplay between the two modes.

== Development ==
In October 1996, Access Software announced plans for a new Tex Murphy project, under the working title Trance. The game continues the Tex Murphy tradition of using some well-known actors to portray major characters, such as Michael York, Henry Darrow, Richard Norton, Joe Estevez and Clint Howard.

Overseer was the first game to ship a version developed specifically for DVD-ROM (although pre-existing games with DVD-ROM versions were on the market earlier). The North American package contained two copies of the game, one on five CDs and one on a single DVD. The advantage to the DVD version was the absence of any disc swapping and the higher quality video files used. They were otherwise identical in content. Some versions of the game have a blinking red LED embedded in the front of the box, on top of the central building. Later and international versions sold the two versions separately.

Initially, Access intended to develop a proper sequel to The Pandora Directive called Trance, but shifted their plan to Overseer in order to take a shorter term contract with Intel, who wanted a game to bundle with upcoming hardware. The choice to use an existing story arose out of the needs of an accelerated development cycle. Never intended as a full-on sequel, let alone the final Tex Murphy game, director Adrian Carr said that it was created solely as a demonstration for a new Intel computer chip. When Intel decided to drop the bundle, Access Software continued development and expanded the interactive areas, and published the finished game themselves.

The cliffhanger ending was intended as a lead-in to a true sequel Trance, which was later expanded into a trilogy of games, tentatively titled Chance, Polarity, and Trance. However, Access was sold to Microsoft shortly after Overseer's release and the Tex sequels were put on permanent hold. This was due to the merge, the series' declining sales, and the decline of adventure games as a whole. In October 2004, Microsoft sold Overseer developer Access Software and rights to the game to Take-Two Interactive who then renamed the studio to Indie Built, but in 2005 the latter shut its doors. After Indie was closed, the rights to the series transferred to a group of former Access employees, among whom was Aaron Conners. Since Overseer, Conners and Jones have tried to give fans some hints as to where the story was headed: these hints included Flash animations and a series of "Old Time Radio" episodes. All further animations and radio episodes were cancelled in 2008.

After the closing of Indie Built, Chris Jones and Aaron Conners re-acquired the rights, and hoped to finance a new Tex game by developing casual hidden object games. During this time, they commenced some exploratory pre-development but were unable to generate enough capital to develop a sequel. In 2012, Chris and Aaron launched a Kickstarter campaign to raise the additional money needed to do a "full" Tex Murphy game. The campaign exceeded its initial goal of $450,000 on June 7th; production on Project Fedora began on June 18th.

== Reception ==
Reception

Aggregate score
Aggregator	Score
GameRankings	82%

Review scores
Publication	Score
Adventure Gamers	(2004) 4/5 (1998) 3.5/5
CNET Gamecenter	8/10
Computer Games Strategy Plus	2.5/5
Computer Gaming World	3/5
GameSpot	6.3/10
Génération 4	3/6
Hyper	64%
Next Generation	2/5
PC Gamer (US)	69%
PC PowerPlay	89%

Tex Murphy: Overseer received favorable reviews according to the review aggregation website GameRankings, but many critics felt it compared negatively to the previous two entries in the series, Under a Killing Moon and The Pandora Directive. Key points of criticism centered largely on technical flaws including high system requirements and narrow hardware support for 3D acceleration and DVD video playback. The removal of multiple narrative paths found in The Pandora Directive was also noted. Computer Gaming World's Scorpia considered this game as a step down from Pandora Directive, noting its cliffhanger in the plot and a lack of replayability of the previous games. Next Generation said, "Die-hard fans of the Tex Murphy games will find more of what they like. However, if you're looking for an adventure game that'll sweep you off your feet and make the hours fly by, look elsewhere."

The game was nominated for the "PC Adventure Game of the Year" award at the Academy of Interactive Arts & Sciences' inaugural Interactive Achievement Awards, which was ultimately given to Blade Runner.
