= Martian Memorandum =

1991 video game

- Developer: Access Software
- Publisher: Access Software
- Designers: Chris Jones; Brent Erickson
- Programmer: Brent Erickson
- Series: Tex Murphy
- Platform: MS-DOS
- Release: NA: September 1991
- Genre: Adventure
- Mode: Single-player

Martian Memorandum is a dystopian cyberpunk/noir graphic adventure game that was originally released in 1991 for MS-DOS. It was developed and published by Access Software. The game is the second in the series of Tex Murphy mysteries; its immediate sequel is Under a Killing Moon. The game is set in 2039, several years after Mean Streets.

The game was re-released in 2014 on Steam with support for Windows, macOS, and Linux.

== Plot ==
Tex Murphy is hired by business mogul Marshall Alexander, founder of TerraForm Corporation, to locate his missing daughter, Alexis. As in the first game, Tex travels between destinations and interrogates characters associated with the subject such as Alexander's attorney, his wife, and Alexis's roommate and business partners. Interrogations are menu-based and dialogues open up additional destinations and dialogue options. The investigation reveals to Tex that the girl's disappearance is linked with an item in Alexander's possession.

Alexis has been traced on planet Mars, whose exploitation is mostly owned by Alexander's company. Tex finds out that Alexander was actually Collier Stanton, a scientist and explorer of Mars, infamous for killing mutant colonists to obtain the "Oracle Stone". With this stone, Alexander foresaw the future, read antagonists' minds and built his corporate empire. Alexis's good will was used to lure her into stealing the Stone and bring it to Mars, only to fall into the hands of Thomas Dangerfield, the original discoverer of the Stone.

The character of Larry Hammond, who appeared in Mean Streets, returns to this game, giving information to the player. Lowell Percival, who is introduced here, also appears in Killing Moon, as does Mac Malden, who appears in both Killing Moon and Pandora Directive.

== Gameplay ==
Interrogation scene

Unlike the more experimental Mean Streets, Martian Memorandum adheres to the genre conventions of the point-and-click adventure game. The gameplay style is based on interrogations, gathering information which "unlocks" new destinations and interrogation options. A verb bar at the bottom of the screen allows players to select different ways to interact with their environment. Certain objects can be collected, placed in an inventory and then used at a later point in time. It also introduced dialog trees to the series. Conversations feature voice and small video clips, elements that were greatly expanded in later games in the series. The game is notable for its increased use of digitized human voices and digital "video" of human actors, playable even through a PC's internal speaker.

== Reception ==
Dragon gave the game 3 out of 5 stars. Computer Gaming World in 1992 praised the audio and digitized animation, and concluded that "Martian Memorandum produces hours of enjoyment [and] provides a tremendous challenge". That year the magazine named it one of the year's top four adventure games.

=== Sales ===
As of July 1992, the game had sold approximately 85,000 copies.
