= Countdown (video game) =

1990 video game

- Developer: Access Software
- Publisher: Access Software
- Designers: Brent Erickson; Chris Jones
- Platform: MS-DOS
- Release: 1990
- Genre: Adventure
- Mode: Single-player

Countdown is a point-and-click adventure game released by Access Software for MS-DOS in 1990. The game was re-released on GOG.com on 26 July 2021.

The player plays as Mason Powers, a CIA agent who wakes up in a Turkish mental hospital, suffering from partial amnesia and accused of murdering his supervisor. Powers must escape the hospital, find out who framed him, piece together his memory, and prevent terrorists from blowing up a peace conference.

== Development ==
Amiga and Atari ST versions of Countdown were planned for release in Autumn 1991, but were never released.

== Reception ==
Computer Gaming World's Charles Ardai stated that "Countdown is as close to perfect as any game can be. It also comes closer to earning its self-appointed identification as an 'Interactive Movie' than any of its predecessors or competitors". The magazine wrote that excellent VGA graphics, sound, and controls made the game a "feature film" compared to the "mere cartoons" from Sierra On-Line, and compensated for the stock plot devices of amnesia and a protagonist falsely accused of murder.

The One gave Countdown an overall score of 84%, praising the game's "cinematic atmosphere", which they attributed to the game's digitized graphics, "spine-chilling" sound effects, and the game's flashback sequences. While expressing that Countdown isn't an 'interactive movie' but rather an adventure with cinematic effects, The One compared Countdown's visuals to British science fiction series Joe 90, and 1965 spy film The Ipcress File. Despite praising the game's 'good' animation, The One criticized Countdown's 'average' graphics and "limited" inputs, stating that it "can't quite match the breadth or complexity of a top class Sierra or Lucasfilm" game. Despite this, The One praised Countdown as "complex and substantial", and expressed that the game's espionage plot and exotic locations are 'engaging'.
