= Big Finish =

Big Finish may refer to:

- Big Finish Productions, a British company that produces books and audio plays based on science fiction properties
- Big Finish Games, the production company behind the Tesla Effect: A Tex Murphy Adventure adventure game
