= Interactive cinema =

Style of cinema

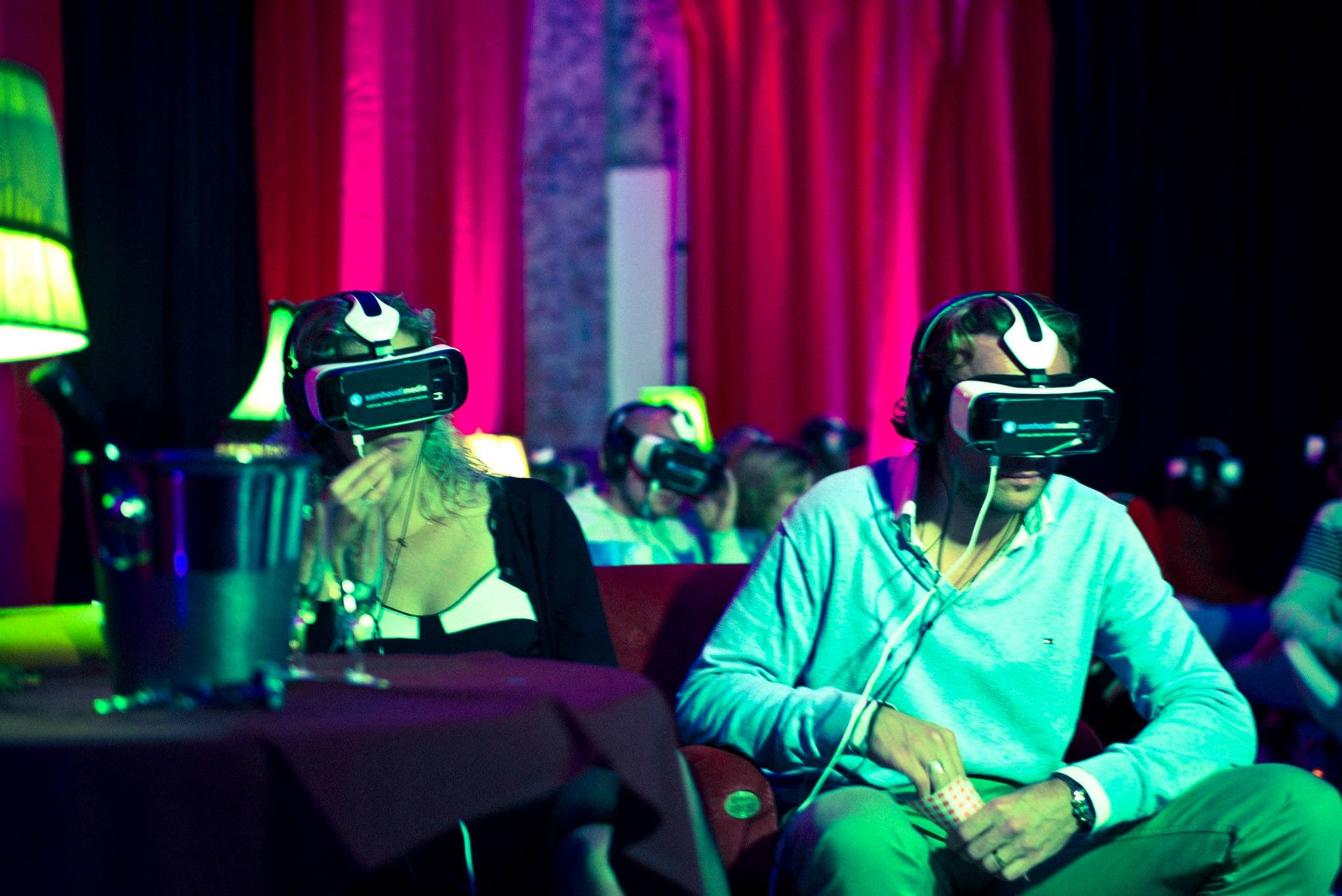
Shows an example of interactive film

Interactive cinema tries to give an audience an active role in the showing of movies.

Another newer definition of interactive cinema is a video game which is a hybrid between participation and viewing, giving the player – or viewer, as it were – a strong amount of control in the characters' decisions. It is compared to interactive film.

This form of media recently has become more relevant. Companies like Netflix used to release media like this, until it was removed on December 1st, 2024 for people not using it.

== History ==
The earliest rudimentary examples of interactive cinema date back to the early 20th century, with "cinematic shooting gallery" games. They were similar to shooting gallery carnival games, except that players shot at a cinema screen displaying film footage of targets. They showed footage of targets, and when a player shot the screen at the right time, it would trigger a mechanism that temporarily pauses the film and registers a point. The first successful example of such a game was Life Targets, released in the United Kingdom in 1912. Cinematic shooting gallery games enjoyed short-lived popularity in several parts of Britain during the 1910s, and often had safari animals as targets, with footage recorded from British imperial colonies. Cinematic shooting gallery games declined some time after the 1910s.

The 1967 Czechoslovak film Kinoautomat by the Czech director Radúz Činčera (presented in the Czech Pavilion at Expo 67 in Montreal) is the first cinema-like interactive movie. The availability of computers for the display of interactive video has made it easier to produce interactive movies.

A prominent pioneer of interactive cinema games is the successful Hideo Kojima (1963–present), whose gameplay often takes a priority to the storyline and long cutscenes. His 1994 game Policenauts, a point-and-click adventure game which has shootout sequences (that make use of the lightgun peripheral on the Sega Saturn version of the game), has a subtitle which reads "Interactive cinema" on the cover art of all versions of said game, which provides an early example of a prominent game-developer labeling a game as such. In 1999 Sega's Shenmue video game series won high praise for its implementation of interactive cinematic elements. Its designer Yu Suzuki stated that his goal "was to create a game that was intricate and lifelike by merging the cinematic qualities of movies and the interactivity of computer games". In 2005, France-based developer Quantic Dream released Fahrenheit (censored version released in the US and Canada as Indigo Prophecy) – a game it dubbed as "interactive cinema."

The first theatrical interactive film to receive a wide release was I'm Your Man, which was produced by Interfilm in 1992. Using controllers mounted to their seats, the audience would vote on which of the three main characters' perspective they saw the story from, and then the choices that said character made. After a single-night test-run in New York City in December 1992, the film toured various theatres from 1993 to 1994.

Despite I'm Your Man receiving mixed reviews, a successor film titled Mr. Payback was produced in collaboration with Sony Pictures for the same voting system in 1995. A third film, Ride For Your Life, followed later the same year. After those two films were met with the same reception, the format was abandoned.

== See also ==
- Cutscene
- Interactive art
- Interaction design
- Interactive movie
- Interactive video
- Laserdisc video game
- Participatory cinema
- Web documentary
