= Tesla Effect: A Tex Murphy Adventure =

2014 video game

Tesla Effect
- Official release poster / art
- Developer: Big Finish Games
- Publisher: Atlus
- Director: Adrian Carr
- Designer: Chris Kelley
- Programmer: Chris Kelley
- Artist: Brian Johnson
- Writers: Aaron Conners; Courtney James; Daniel R. Strong; Chris Jones
- Composer: Bobby James
- Series: Tex Murphy
- Engine: Unity
- Platforms: Windows, OS X
- Release: May 7, 2014
- Genre: Adventure
- Mode: Single-player

Tesla Effect: A Tex Murphy Adventure (developed under the working title Project Fedora) is the sixth game in the Tex Murphy series of detective adventure games, developed by Big Finish Games and published by Atlus. Like the previous three games, it tells much of its story through live-action full-motion video sequences, and features freely explorable 3D environments during gameplay.

== Gameplay ==
Exploration scene of Tex's office

Tesla Effect's gameplay has been described as very similar to Under a Killing Moon, The Pandora Directive, and Tex Murphy: Overseer. As in those titles, players navigate 3D environments in first-person, search for clues, and use inventory items. The game also includes logic puzzles and a branching conversation system for interviewing characters. Like The Pandora Directive, it features "narrative pathing" where player choices affect the story and ending.

== Plot ==
Tesla Effect begins in 2050, seven years after Tex and his love interest, Chelsee Bando, were attacked at the end of Tex Murphy: Overseer. The story starts as Tex suddenly awakes disoriented in his office at the Ritz Hotel with strange markings and signs of violence on his body and no memory of the past seven years. He then discovers that Chelsee has been missing ever since the attack and is presumed dead. He sets out to find out what happened to him, what became of Chelsee, and to regain his past memories. In so doing, Tex uncovers a web of intrigue involving murders, double crosses, and the lost inventions of Nikola Tesla.

== Development ==
=== Background and fundraising ===
In the years following Microsoft's acquisition of Access Software, series creators Chris Jones and Aaron Conners made numerous attempts to revive the Tex Murphy series, but were unable to get approval from Microsoft's management. In 2008, they regained the rights to the series and characters, and, around the same time, founded Big Finish Games, which would employ several key figures from Access Software.

Big Finish Games first announced the game as "Secret Project 'Fedora'" on their website in May 2009, without any details. Previously, Big Finish had considered making a casual game featuring the Tex Murphy character, but after exploring the market, they grew doubtful that such a product would please either casual fans or existing fans of Tex games. Instead, they sought to use the profits from their casual games to finance a Tex Murphy adventure game, but after three years and several releases, they had still not gone into production on Fedora. In early 2012, they began experimenting with new technology in an effort to determine the cost of a new game, but, while they found the costs for such a production had gone down, they still had inadequate funding to produce a game of similar size and scope to the old Tex Murphy titles.

Following the success of Double Fine Adventure and other high-profile titles on Kickstarter, Big Finish decided to crowd source the additional funds needed to turn Project Fedora into a full-length 3D adventure game in the vein of the previous titles. They launched a Kickstarter campaign, and set the date for May 15. This iteration of Project Fedora was pitched to have live-action video cut-scenes, fully 3D environments, and multiple story paths. The fundraising goal was set at $450,000, to be supplemented by $300,000 supplied by Big Finish, for a proposed budget of $750,000 (minus fees and fulfillment costs). Within six days, it had surpassed half the funding needed. On June 7, eight days ahead of the deadline, it reached its minimal funding level of $450,000. As of the project's close on June 16, it had raised $598,104 on Kickstarter, and $14,385 in PayPal donations, for a total of $612,489, 36% over its goal, and continued to allow pledges and upgrades on their own site via PayPal, eventually raising $657,196 by the close of the fundraising campaign on July 31, 2013. Several additions to the game were announced for the extra funding, including expansions to the game's main hub, Chandler Avenue, an orchestral music score, and a playable golf simulator accessible in-game.

=== Production and filming ===
"Project Fedora" entered full production on June 18, 2012. The game was developed using the Unity engine, and the first footage of in-game environments was shown to backers. Principal photography commenced in February 2013, and took place in a newly furnished studio in Big Finish's office in Salt Lake City. Characters were shot entirely against a green screen and then composited into the game scenes. Principal photography concluded on February 22, with additional material filmed in late April. In some cases, backers visiting the offices were used as crew on set. The game's cast included June Lockhart, Steve Valentine, Todd Bridges, and Larry Thomas. The shoot ultimately consisted of more than 140 hours of raw footage and 2600 shots.

On July 10, the birthday of Nikola Tesla, the official title was revealed as Tesla Effect: A Tex Murphy Adventure, and a teaser trailer was unveiled. Atlus became the publisher, supporting Big Finish with distribution, marketing, and quality assurance. The game was released for Microsoft Windows and OS X through GOG.com and Steam in May 2014. Chris Jones explained that the scope of the game had expanded far beyond what was initially planned, describing it as "two full-length Tex Murphy adventure games in one". He also revealed that the game runs at 2K resolution, a possible first for game FMV.

Shortly before the game's release, Big Finish unveiled various production statistics to demonstrate the size and scope of production, revealing that the game would boast over 5 1/2 hours of FMV, including 2,800 visual effects shots; over 31 virtual locations, 20 of which are interactive; and over 1,000 gameplay "steps" in its walkthrough, making it one of the most ambitious productions of its kind, despite a team of only 13 and a relatively small budget.

== Reception ==
Reception

Aggregate scores
| Aggregator | Score |
|---|---|
| GameRankings | 69.25% |
| Metacritic | 68/100 |

Review scores
| Publication | Score |
|---|---|
| Adventure Gamers | 4/5 |
| Giant Bomb | 3/5 |
| Polygon | 7/10 |
| Adventure Classic Gaming | 5/5 |

Tesla Effect: A Tex Murphy Adventure received mixed to positive reviews from critics. Mixed opinions of the game came mostly from general interest gaming sites, whereas more positive opinions of the game came from gaming sites focused on adventure games. It received an average score of 69.25% on GameRankings and a weighted score of 68/100 on Metacritic. The game's production values sharply divided opinion, with most praising the quality of the FMV portions, while criticizing the quality of the in-game graphics.

Tesla Effect was almost universally hailed as a faithful sequel, with much of both the game's praise and criticism hinged on its steadfast adherence to the conventions of the genre and series. Patrick Klepek from Giant Bomb remarked: "It's unapologetic about its roots, even when it probably shouldn't be". Polygon's Justin McElroy wrote that the fans of Tex Murphy will love this game, but thought that the game will have a difficulty with those who are new to the series. Among the conventions commonly criticized were the need to search for small, hard-to-find objects, and the ambiguity of dialog choices.

Adventure Gamers praised the game for its traditional adventure gameplay, arguing that "Tesla Effect doesn't reinvent the wheel, nor does it aim to. What it does attempt – and successfully accomplishes – is to mark the comeback of a beloved adventure gaming icon, and to do so in a way familiar to legions of fans". Likewise, Adventure Classic Gaming praised the game as "a perfect sendoff for a beloved series that has survived the rise and fall of a once dying genre" and "an easy recommendation for all Tex Murphy fans who long to see Tex return in full form".

== Novelization ==
Like Under a Killing Moon and The Pandora Directive, a Tesla Effect novel was published shortly after the release of the game. Unlike previous titles, the game's script was adapted from the novel, written by longtime series scribe Aaron Conners. Although it follows the same basic story, there are many changes, and a different ending. Richard Cobbett of PC Gamer praised the novel in comparison to the game's story. Aaron Conners has since announced two concluding books in the Tex-saga.
