= Three Cards to Midnight =

2009 video game

- Developer: Big Finish Games
- Publisher: Big Finish Games
- Writers: Aaron Conners, Chris Jones
- Platform: Microsoft Windows
- Release: 7 May 2009
- Genres: Adventure, Hidden object game, Puzzle
- Mode: Single-player

Three Cards to Midnight (alternately typeset 3 Cards to Midnight) is a story-driven puzzle video game with elements of hidden object games and adventure games. It was written and designed by Aaron Conners and Chris Jones and is the debut release from independent developer Big Finish Games.

== Gameplay ==
While the game features a thick, complex narrative typical of adventure games, it does not follow the conventions that are typical to the point-and-click genre. Instead, the player is forced to draw connections between keywords and on-screen objects. Unlike a true hidden object game, the objects are in plain sight, and the challenge comes from deducing their relationship to the stage's keywords. How successful the player affects their ranking, which in turn affects the ending of the story. Also, a player only has a limited opportunity to make the correct association between objects in the gaming environment and clues provided by the protagonist, Jess.

== Development ==
The idea for a female protagonist was implemented early in development.

== Story ==
According to the developer, the story revolves around the protagonist, Jess who has hired a tarot reader to assist her in retracing the memories of her past. Her only memory is that she had met with her boyfriend with the intention of celebrating her 30th Birthday, only to meet with her parents the day after in Florida. Everything apart from that is a memory blank. With the help of the stranger she has never met, Jess attempts to unlock the secrets in her mind that seem so forbidden and esoteric only to learn that she is at the heart of a very dangerous and personal conspiracy.
