= Amazon: Guardians of Eden =

1992 video game

- Developer: Access Software
- Publisher: Access Software
- Designers: Chris Jones; Kevin L. Jones
- Programmer: Bruce Ward
- Artist: Douglas Vandegrift
- Platform: MS-DOS
- Release: 1992
- Genre: Adventure
- Mode: Single-player

Amazon: Guardians of Eden is a point-and-click adventure game for MS-DOS published by Access Software in 1992. The game follows a researcher named Jason who ventures into the Amazon rainforest in search of his brother.

Amazon is heavily inspired by mid-century serial films and was compared to then-popular films such as Indiana Jones and Romancing the Stone that were also based on old serials. The game uses digitized images of real actors and sets to evoke a cinematic look and is presented as an "Access Serial" divided into serialized chapters. It also featured technical achievements for the time: Amazon is one of the first games with Super VGA graphics, digitized voice-overs, and an in-game hint system.

The game's reputation has shifted over time. Early reviewers were broadly positive and believed the game delivered a cinematic experience. Later reviewers, however, have reappraised the game and view it much more negatively.

== Plot ==
Jason is a young man who works at Allister Research. One day in 1957, he receives a letter from his brother Allen who has been exploring the Amazon rainforest. Allen writes his expedition was on the verge of an incredible discovery when they were mysteriously attacked. Jason learns that a man named Colonel Sanchez is also in pursuit of Allen.

Clues left by Allen lead Jason to Peru, where he meets a woman named Maya. They travel deeper into the rainforest, eventually finding a sick and injured Allen. Allen explains that his team was close to reaching their goal, but Colonel Sanchez is after the same goal and attacked Allen's expedition. The three continue traveling but are ambushed by Sanchez and his men, and Allen is killed.

Eventually, Maya reveals she is an Amazon, an ancient tribe of warrior women tasked with guarding sacred waters that can regenerate the rainforest—the discovery that Allen had been searching for. Jason kills Sanchez and is embraced by the Amazon tribe. He and Maya decide to stay together forever.

== Gameplay ==
Amazon is a point-and-click adventure game with numerous timed and action elements. The player uses a mouse cursor to interact with environments and other characters. Items can be added to the player's inventory and then combined with other items or used to complete tasks and solve puzzles. Often, tasks must be completed within a certain timeframe. Some action sequences require the use of the keyboard but can be skipped.

Some scenes let the player swap control between Jason and his ally Maya. This character-swapping mechanic was a novel mechanic for the time and positively noted by reviewers.

== Development ==
Utah-based Access Software set out to create a pastiche of serial "jungle films." The staff at Access, with Chris Jones as lead designer, wanted to create a composite of the genre's most notable features and stereotypes, such as a heavy use of cliffhangers. The game both imitates and parodies the genre.

Doug Vandegrift helmed the game's art team. Similar to Access's previous games, Amazon used mixed media to create its scenes. Digitized actors and sets were blended with computer graphics to produce the final images. Flashpoint Productions, also based in Utah, contributed artwork.

== Reception ==
Amazon received positive reviews on release. Reviewers enjoyed the serial movie-style presentation. Digitized sprites gave the game a photorealistic appearance compared to other games of the era, and the Super VGA graphics were considered impressive. The game's hint system (Note: Called an "on-line hint system," the hint system is entirely contained within the game. It is unrelated to the Internet.) was also seen as a highlight, preventing players from getting frustrated or stuck.

Computer Gaming World published one of the game's most glowing reviews, calling Amazon an "outstanding" game that honored its cinematic influences as well as the history and myths of the Amazon region.

Reviewers did criticize the game's user interface—moving the characters and interacting with the game world was called "stiff" and "sticky." Amazon also had high system requirements for the time, preventing some players from running the game. Some reviewers also felt the overt references to movie serials made the plot feel cliché.

Modern reviews of Amazon take a harsher view of the game. The game's cinematic presentation, while impressive to reviewers at release, has been called grainy and the acting "horrible." The awkward interface, noted during the game's release, has prompted later reviewers to call the game "borderline unplayable."

Writing for PC Gamer, Richard Cobbett called Amazon "dreadful" and one of the worst games of all time. Cobbett criticized the game for low-quality graphics, frustrating gameplay, and racist depictions of native people. In particular, Cobbett said an action sequence involving a canoe was "actual, literal Hell."

== The Wild Women of Wongo ==
Early in the game, it is possible to play a short clip of the protagonist Jason's "favorite film" The Wild Women of Wongo, a real adventure film released in 1958.
