= Miroslav Horníček =

Miroslav Horníček (10 November 1918 in Plzeň – 15 February 2003 in Liberec) was a Czech actor, writer, director, artist and theatre theoretician. He is well known in the Czech Republic for his on-stage partnership with Jan Werich, his talkshows (Hovory H ...) and many small roles in Czech movies and TV.

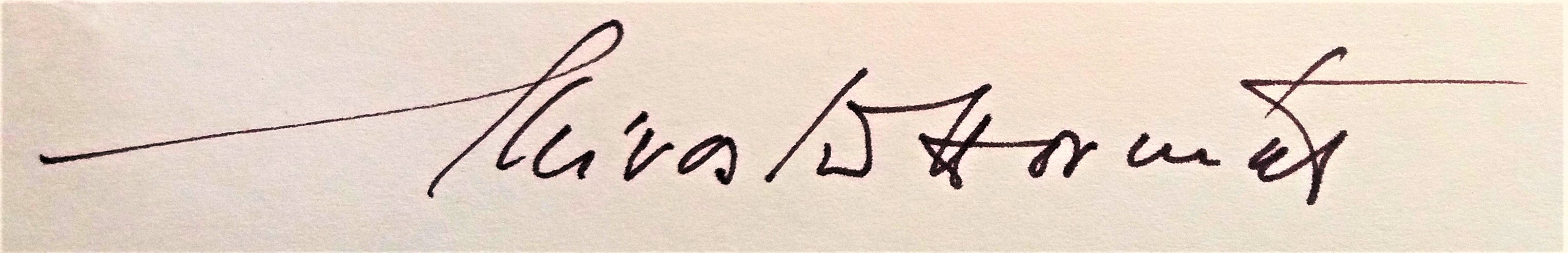
Signature of Miroslav Horníček, Czech actor (1993)

== Partial filmography ==
- Polibek ze stadionu (1948)
- Pan Novák (1949) – Jirotka
- Soudný den (1949)
- Mikolás Ales (1952) – Valek
- Mladá léta (1953) – Vaclav Svetly
- There Was Once a King... (1955) – Beautiful prince – son of Alabaster I.
- Z mého zivota (1955) – (voice, uncredited)
- When the Woman Butts In (1960) – Dr. Faust
- Kazdá koruna dobrá (1961) – Krytina
- Neschovávejte se, kdyz prsí (1962) – farár Tadeás Hora
- Bez svatozáre (1964) – Narrator (voice)
- Táto, sezen stene (1964) – Father
- Lov na mamuta (1965) – (voice)
- Ohne Pass in fremden Betten (1965) – Mr. Jelínek
- Smrt za oponou (1967) – kapitán Chrástek
- Kinoautomat (1967) – Pan Novak
- Hudba kolonád (1975)
- Barrandovské nocturno aneb Jak film zpíval a tancil (1984) – Himself – entertainer
