= Mr. Payback: An Interactive Movie =

- Directed by: Bob Gale
- Written by: Bob Gale
- Produced by: Mark Franco; Jeremiah Samuels; Holly Keenan
- Starring: Billy Warlock; Leslie Easterbrook; Christopher Lloyd; Bruce McGill; Holly Fields
- Music by: Michael Tavera
- Distributed by: Interfilm Technologies; Sony New Technologies
- Release date: February 17, 1995
- Running time: approximately 20 to 30 minutes
- Country: United States
- Language: English
- Budget: $1.6 million
- Box office: $241,000

Mr. Payback: An Interactive Movie is a 1995 American science-fiction/adventure/comedy short film written and directed by Bob Gale. The film stars an android (Billy Warlock) who, in a number of possible storylines, takes action by humiliating or attacking people who have committed crimes or have done wrong in the past. Christopher Lloyd, who had previously worked with Gale on the Back to the Future trilogy, worked on this film as well. The music was scored by Michael Tavera, who had composed the music for the animated Back to the Future series

Designed as an interactive movie, it comprises slightly over two hours of footage, approximately 20 minutes of which is seen in each viewing. It requires the audience to vote for various directions the story will take, using a joystick attached to the armrests of their seats. A special LaserDisc-based machine in the projection booth was designed to make instantaneous edits as the story unfolded. The film took up four CAV LaserDiscs. (Note: Although it hasn't been confirmed, the discs were most likely single-sided as the LaserDisc players used in the machine, a set of heavy-duty Pioneer LD-V8000s, did not feature automatic side changing.)

The movie billed itself as "the world's first interactive movie," but it was predated by 1992's I'm Your Man and 1967's Kinoautomat.

== Plot ==
(Note: Due to most of this film being inaccessible, the following summary has been compiled from contemporary sources and the small amount of surviving footage, and may not bear a perfect resemblance to the complete film, should it ever resurface)

Mr. Payback is a vigilante android who operates a revenge-for-hire service. Similar to the animated character Inspector Gadget, Mr. Payback has a variety of tools and weapons embedded in his body that he can expose for use when needed.

The film opens with Mr. Payback wandering around Los Angeles looking for troublemakers to punish, with the audience choosing who he encounters next. Some of these encounters and punishments include:

- Upsetting a selfish Car Jerk by dismantling his car piece by piece after he parks in a handicapped space.
- Setting a bike thief's clothes on fire as he tries to dismantle a bike and steal its parts.
- Using his weaponry to intimidate a gang of obnoxious young men in a bar after they belittle and mock him.

Returning to his headquarters, Mr. Payback and his assistant Gwen accept three clients via the internet, with the audience deciding whose case he pursues.

Each chosen case plays out the same way: Mr. Payback speaks to the client who explains how they have been wronged, and then locates and politely confronts the respective villain in an effort to hear their side of the story.

Once the villain confirms their mistreatment of the client and attempts to get rid of Mr. Payback, he goes around looking for hard evidence to expose the villain with, before ultimately kidnapping them for the film's finale.

The film culminates with a game show sequence entitled Payback Timein which the kidnapped villain is made to perform humiliating stunts for the pleasure of an in-universe audience, with the real audience choosing which challenges they face. At the beginning of the sequence, the audience chooses a celebrity guest to join in on mocking the villain. Depending on the selected villain, these celebrities can include Ice-T, Paul Anka, Cheech Marin, and Frank Gorshin, among others.

Similarly to a traditional video game. Mr. Payback features a score count that increases depending on the choices made. If the audience manages to score more than a set amount of points, they are shown a bonus epilogue scene where Mr. Payback and Gwen celebrate a successful operation by attending a "Non-interactive film festival", which is interrupted by noisy teenagers that Mr. Payback and the audience have to deal with.

This score display also provides commentary on the audience's choices via overlaid captions that appear at specific moments.

== Cast ==
- Billy Warlock as Payton Bach (Mr. Payback)
- Holly Fields as Gwen
- Bruce McGill as James Konklin
- Christopher Lloyd as Ed Jarvis
- Leslie Easterbrook as Diane Wyatt
- David Correia as Raoul Alvarez
- Victor Love as Lloyd Braxton
- Carol-Ann Plante as Cara Cook
- Michael Talbott as Car Jerk
- Brendan Ford as Park Vandal
- Gilbert Rosales as Bike Thief
- Eddie Deezen as Phil the Guard
- Robby Sutton as Moe
- Sasha Jenson as Larry
- Joseph D. Reitman as Dick
- Paul Anka as Himself
- Ice-T as Himself
- Cheech Marin as Himself
- Frank Gorshin as Himself

== Release ==
=== Theatrical Release ===
Due to its interactive nature, screenings of Mr. Payback were presented in a different manner than those of a standard feature film.

As it was only designed to run for 20 to 30 minutes, the film would be repeated three times in each screening to match the runtime of a typical feature film, with the audience being given the opportunity to make different choices.

Audiences were also not asked to be silent during the film, and were instead encouraged to talk and shout as much as they wanted.

=== Home media ===
The film has never been released outside of its original screenings and is now considered to be lost, with only the original trailer and clips from contemporary TV coverage being known to survive.

== Reception ==
=== Box office ===
Despite its modest budget of $1.6 million, the movie ultimately proved to be a financial failure, only managing to gross $241,000 during its theatrical run. This low box office return came about as a result of the film's extremely limited release, with only 25 theatres throughout America showing the film due to the $50,000+ each theatre would have to spend to upgrade their screens with the necessary interactive equipment.

=== Critical response ===
Mr. Payback received negative reviews from critics. Roger Ebert of the Chicago Sun Times gave the film a half-star out of a possible four, and called it "the kind of film where horrified parents might encourage the kids to shout at the screen, hoping the noise might drown out the flood of garbage." He and Gene Siskel both commented that while the concept of combining film with interactivity has possibilities, they are not explored by Mr. Payback, which centers on bathroom humor and appeals to the audience's most sadistic urges. Ty Burr of Entertainment Weekly tagged the film with an "F" grade, declaring it to be "horribly written, dreadfully acted, and cretinously plotted."
