= I'm Your Man (1992 film) =

- 1998 DVD cover
- Directed by: Bob Bejan
- Written by: Bob Bejan; Michael Ian Black; Robert Ben Garant; Jeff Durian; Alisa Tager
- Starring: Kevin Seal; Mark Metcalf; Colleen Quinn
- Edited by: Rutt Video
- Music by: Joe Jackson
- Production company: Controlled Entropy Entertainment
- Distributed by: Interfilm Technologies; Sony Pictures Entertainment; Loews Theatres
- Release date: December 18, 1992
- Running time: 20 minutes
- Country: United States
- Language: English
- Budget: $370,000.00

I'm Your Man is a 1992 short film which was created to showcase Loews Theatres' interactive cinema technology. In the film, a woman tries to meet up with an FBI agent at a party in order to deliver evidence of corrupt business dealings, but instead bumps into a man who mistakenly thinks she is attracted to him, as well as her business partner, who intends to kill her to keep the evidence of his misdeeds from getting out. Audiences used seat-mounted joysticks to vote between three options in action at six different points throughout the movie.

== Plot ==
A scientist named Professor Bob explains the film's voting system and introduces the three main characters. After this introduction, the audience is shown an opening scene where they can "channel-surf" between the characters' perspectives by casting a vote, with the film switching to the chosen character as soon as a majority is reached. (Note: In the 1998 DVD release, the viewer is only able to switch perspectives at set intervals, due to format limitations. The introductory sequence is also replaced with credits, but remains viewable as a special feature; A. Whitney Brown also remains listed in the film's end credits.)

Leslie Campbell, the head of an architectural company in New York City, has been framed for siphoning money by her corrupt business partner Richard Hewitt. To clear her name, she arranges to provide incriminating evidence to an FBI agent at a party in an office building. Laurence Banks, a double agent working for Richard, calls to move up the meeting time a half hour and tells her that she will recognise him via the password "I'm your man." Not satisfied with Laurence's plan to just acquire the evidence, Richard murders Laurence and plans to kill Leslie at the party to ensure her silence.

At the venue, Leslie takes the elevator up with Jack Beaner, a socially awkward businessman who is attending the party to pick up women. The audience chooses which character (Jack, Leslie, or Richard) the film follows, and votes of action now occur at set intervals. Regardless of which choices the audience makes, the same basic plot unfolds, except the ending.

Jack realises that he, thanks to misleading advice from a friend, has misunderstood the kind of party he is attending. Deciding to see if he can pick up some partygoers before he leaves, he eventually approaches Leslie and ignorantly says the password while flirting with her, causing Leslie to believe that he is her contact. Leslie attempts to give him the evidence, much to his confusion. Just as Leslie realises her mistake, Richard ambushes the two and, after unsuccessfully offering Leslie a fortune in hush money, begins shooting at them. Jack, panicking, climbs out of a window onto a fire escape while Leslie sprays Richard with mace and escapes. Richard turns to the audience and, with some over-engineered gadgets, threatens to either electrocute them or lock them in the theatre if they do not tell him which way they went.

On the roof of the building, Jack is confronted by FBI agents who fill him in on Leslie's situation. Back at the party, Leslie attempts to find her contact by approaching various partygoers. She questions whether she should take Richard's hush money or continue trying to expose him.

If the audience chooses the former, she approaches Richard and tries to negotiate over the discs, but Richard remains determined to kill her. Jack, followed by the agents, rushes into the room. With Richard thus distracted, Leslie kicks him in the groin and leaves him to be arrested by the agents.

If the latter is chosen, Leslie borrows a microphone off of the party's DJ, and directly asks for any agents to reveal themselves. Richard catches up with her, and holds the entire party at gunpoint. Jack runs into the room to save Leslie, accidentally slamming the door into the back of Richard's head, knocking him over. The agents arrest him.

The characters ask the audience to decide which of the three receives a happy ending. In Jack's ending, Richard's arrest leads Jack to be swarmed by news reporters and partygoers while Leslie amorously expresses her gratitude to him. In Leslie's ending, she is given an extremely valuable design contract before she and Jack run off to catch the Concorde to Paris. In Richard’s ending, Leslie abandons Jack as Richard is removed from the building by the agents. Once they reach the street, the agents are revealed to also be working for Richard, with his "arrest" merely being a way for him to escape with the evidence.

== Cast ==
- Kevin Seal as Jack Beaner
- Colleen Quinn as Leslie Campbell
- Mark Metcalf as Richard Hewitt
- A. Whitney Brown as Professor Bob
- Peter Greene as Henchman

== Production ==
The movie was designed as the first test of Interfilm, Bob Bejan's interactive cinema company. The film was shot on 16mm Kodak film, transferred to LaserDisc, and digitally projected to allow for nearly seamless transitions when audiences made their choices. However, this also meant that it had to be limited to 45 minutes of content, due to the contemporary limitations of the LaserDisc format. (Note: Later Interfilm releases got around this limitation by using multiple LaserDisc players that the system would switch between as needed. These would also use 30-minute CAV discs to reduce loading times; the original Interfilm patent describes I'm Your Man as using the slower hour-long CLV format) The entire film was shot on location in the interiors and surrounding streets of a rented 11-story office building in Soho, the same building where Interfilm's offices were housed. The movie was shot over only six days, always shooting night-for-night from 11 p.m. to 6 a.m. each day.

With a budget of just $270,000, the production team was limited even in the number of actors they could use; only 16 extras were retained, so Bejan had to utilize camera techniques to make the party seem well-attended. Even the count of 16 was only possible because two of the screenwriters, Michael Ian Black and Ben Garant, served as extras for no additional pay. Both went on to become prominent comedy actors. The numerous women who appear in Jack's introductory scenes were not employed by the production team at all; the four principals of Interfilm had connections in the modeling industry, so they put out word that there would be a party with vodka at the filming location, and then filmed the professional models as they headed towards the building.

The music was both composed and performed by Joe Jackson. Explaining why he became interested in the project, Jackson said, "I think whenever you get an opportunity to be involved in something new, you might as well be in on it, even if it sort of goes the way of 3-D glasses and Odorama, or whatever." Jackson told the producers that while he had to charge a fee for his services, he was more interested in computers than in money, so they paid him with a nominal fee, a computer, and personal instruction on using the computer. Jackson found that the soundtrack liberated him to write pieces that were comedic and stylistically unfashionable.

=== Unproduced Rerelease ===
According to storyboards included as special features on the DVD release, I'm Your Man was set to be updated and enhanced for a wide release in 1994.

This version of the film would have contained newly filmed scenes that were integrated with the original 1992 footage. This footage was to contain additional choices for the audience to make, scenes such as Jack imagining himself fighting for Leslie's life in a boxing match, and an explanation for how the channel-surfing section is possible within the context of the story; FBI agents monitoring the characters through a multi-camera surveillance system.

Despite the original film still being shown in select theatres in 1994, this updated version was never produced, with Mr. Payback being used for the wide release of Interfilm in early 1995.

== Distribution ==
The film premiered in a special theater at the Loews on 19th Street and Broadway in New York City in December 1992. Tickets to the 20-minute show were $3, and ticket holders were allowed to stay for as many viewings as they wanted. Retrofitting an existing theater with the necessary voting equipment cost approximately $70,000, and 42 other theaters made the investment in 1993 and 1994. The film—and the interactivity itself—were well received by teens but dismissed by critics and adult moviegoers as being "as gimmicky as three-dimensional glasses or scratch 'n' sniff" and "not like watching a real movie... more like rooting for a basketball team." A common criticism was that moviegoers would use the controls at vacant seats to vote more than once. Another concern was that the act of voting took moviegoers out of the story; it was thought that real-time interaction hampered the viewing experience, and engineers began working on an alternative technology that would let users customize movies before viewing began.

Although the format ultimately failed due to lack of marketing and mixed audience reception, Interfilm would go on to produce Mr. Payback: An Interactive Movie and Ride For Your Life for the same voting system in 1995. Despite both of these successor films having higher budgets and featuring multiple celebrity actors, they would ultimately see the same reception as I'm Your Man.

I'm Your Man was released on DVD on August 18, 1998 as part of a second attempt at interactive video. I'm Your Man is the only film produced for the Interfilm system that is known to exist in its entirety, with Mr. Payback and Ride For Your Life being considered lost outside of a few surviving clips.

== See also ==
- Mr. Payback: An Interactive Movie
- Night Trap
- Black Mirror: Bandersnatch
