= The Pandora Directive =

1996 video game

- Cover art
- Developer: Access Software
- Publisher: Access Software
- Designers: Chris Jones; Aaron Conners
- Programmer: David Curtin
- Artists: Neil Galloway; Nathan Larsen
- Composer: Third Ear Productions
- Series: Tex Murphy
- Platform: MS-DOS
- Release: NA: August 1, 1996; EU: 1996
- Genre: Adventure
- Mode: Single-player

The Pandora Directive is the fourth installment in the Tex Murphy series of graphic adventure games produced by Access Software. After its creators reacquired the rights to the series, it was re-released on Good Old Games in July 2009 for Windows and in 2012 for macOS, and then released on Steam in 2014 with support for Windows, macOS, and Linux. In 2021, Big Finish Games announced that a remaster of The Pandora Directive is in development.

== Gameplay ==
The Pandora Directive was the second game in the series to make use of Under a Killing Moon's engine and feature real-time 3D graphics. Players explore environments from a first-person perspective and can click to examine objects or interact using a variety of verbs. In addition to verb interaction, players can gather, use, and combine items to solve a variety of puzzles, and must also solve self-contained logic puzzles. Character interaction consists of two primary modes: asking characters about a universal list of topics available to the player, and branching dialog trees. These dialog trees were unusual at the time in that they did not display Tex's full response, but rather a short and sometimes humorous description, a convention later popularized by BioWare.

Dialog scene. Interface is similar to Under a Killing Moon.

The Pandora Directive was one of the first adventure games to feature branching narratives and multiple endings. The player could take Tex down "Mission Street", where he takes the high road and wins the love of his longtime crush, Chelsee Bando. Mission Street has three possible endings. Down "Boulevard of Broken Dreams", Tex is a selfish and cynical jerk worrying only about the big payoff. Boulevard of Broken Dreams leads to four possible endings. If the player chooses neither path, Tex will go down "Lombard Street". On this path, he's not really a nice guy, but he's not mean either. Lombard Street leads to two possible endings, both of which are common to Mission Street. The "best" Mission Street ending is achieved when the player has taken the high road every time he was given the choice, and by exactly following two conversation paths earlier in the game.

The Pandora Directive provided two difficulty settings, Entertainment and Game Players mode. On Entertainment, hints were available, and the player could bypass certain puzzles if the player so chose. Some minor objects and video scenes were available on this setting that were not available on Game Players mode. A total of 1500 points were available on Entertainment mode. On Game Players mode, no hints were available, and puzzles could not be bypassed. Bonus points were available to those who solved certain puzzles in an allotted time or within a certain number of moves. In addition to this, extra in game locations and puzzles were available on Game Players mode that weren't available on Entertainment mode, making for a more challenging game playing experience. A total of 4000 points were available on Game Players mode.

== Plot ==
Like all Tex Murphy games, The Pandora Directive takes place in post-World War III San Francisco in April 2043. After the devastating events of WWIII, many major cities have been rebuilt (as is the case with New San Francisco), though certain areas still remain as they were before the war (as in Old San Francisco). WWIII also left another mark on the world: the formation of two classes of citizens, specifically, the Mutants and the Norms. After the events of Under a Killing Moon, tensions between the two groups have begun to diminish. The end to the Crusade for Genetic Purity was a turning point in the relations between Mutants and "Norms". Tex still lives on Chandler Ave., which recently underwent a city-funded cleanup. The events of WWIII still left the planet with no ozone layer, and to protect their citizens many countries adopted a time reversal. Instead of sleeping at night, and being awake in the day, humans have become nocturnal, in a manner of speaking. Though Tex lives in what is considered a Mutant area of town, he himself is a "Norm".

In The Pandora Directive, after accidentally offending his love interest Chelsee Bando, Tex (Chris Jones) is hired by Gordon Fitzpatrick (Kevin McCarthy) to find his friend, Thomas Malloy (John Agar). He learns that Malloy stayed at the Ritz, and decides to follow up the lead after reconciling with Chelsee and agreeing to go for dinner with her at her apartment. Upon investigating Malloy's room, Tex is knocked out by a mysterious masked figure dressed in black. Tex is out through the night, inadvertently missing his date with Chelsee. After finding out that a female acquaintance of Malloy works at the Fuchsia Flamingo club, Tex offers to take Chelsee there to both apologise and hopefully to check out the lead. Regardless of whether Chelsee comes out with Tex or not, she will decide to take a vacation to Phoenix for a few days. At the club, Tex meets with the girl, Emily who agrees to trade information on Malloy if Tex can find out who is stalking her. She gives a note she received from her stalker to Tex and upon showing it to his connection in the police station Mac Malden, Tex finds out that Emily is being observed by the Black Arrow Killer.

Tex is able to discover that the NSA is involved and looking for Malloy, and breaks into one of their headquarters, Autotech. He finds out that the NSA are using video surveillance to monitor the goings on in Emily's room at the Fuchsia Flamingo. Tex finds the source of this and sees a figure dresses similarly to the person who attacked him in Malloy's room waiting to confront Emily. Tex hurries over to the club and is able to get there just in time to see the Killer jump out of the window carrying a small box (whether Emily survives or not will depend on the storyline path). Tex chases him down and in the ensuing fight accidentally causes the Killer to fall off the roof and die. Tex removes the Killer's mask and sees that it is NSA agent Dag Horton, who had an office in Autotech. Tex is pulled in for questioning by the police, but is allowed to leave when an unknown woman enters the station and speaks to Mac.

Tex retrieves the box that Horton stole from Emily's room, but is seized by the NSA and taken to Jackson Cross's office at Autotech. He is threatened to stay out of their affairs, and is forced to hand over the box. Returning to his office, Tex is met by the woman who talked the police into letting him go. She reveals her name is Regan Madsen, she is Thomas Malloy's daughter and that Malloy sent out several boxes like the one Tex found. Tex goes to the Fuchsia Flamingo and finds out that Emily is Malloy's wife, hence her being sent a box. using the return address on the packaging, Tex is finally able to track down Malloy in a run down warehouse in the industrial district. After establishing that Tex is not with the NSA, he reveals that he used to work at Roswell, the military base where a spacecraft allegedly crashed in 1947. Malloy asserts that the crash was legitimate and that the government covered the story up. The military began investigating then wreckage to look for weapons, and in the 1980s Malloy came into the project to attempt to decipher the hieroglyphics on the craft. After World War 3, Malloy left the project but was able to continue his research in secret. Before Malloy can continue his story, two NSA agents arrive and kill him. Tex is able to escape by blowing the building up.

Tex fills a disheartened Fitzpatrick in on the events, but insists on following up on the details he has uncovered. Fitzpatrick tells him that he worked with Malloy in Roswell, and that after becoming close friends, Malloy confided in him that he had been deciphering the alien hieroglyphics and had discovered that a second spacecraft had crashed somewhere on Earth. He then reveals that he received one of Malloy's boxes and there are probably about 6 in circulation. Tex meets with Regan to tell her about her father, and she agrees to give him her box despite reservations that Tex will open it and sell off the information for himself. After stealing Horton's personal effects from the morgue where his body is being held, Tex is able to get into Autotech's evidence room to recover Emily's box. Tex travels to the Cosmic Connection shop and speaks to Archie Ellis, an eccentric comic book nerd and ufologist who recently interviewed Malloy. Archie tells him that the famous author Elijah Witt set up the interview between them, during which Malloy made several cryptic references to something called 'The Pandora Device'. He also reveals that during their research into the alien crafts at Roswell, the scientists accidentally released something into the facility that proceeded to kill off practically everyone in the complex before the military moved in and quarantined the entire base. Archie tells Tex that Malloy sent him one of the boxes but it was stolen, and that the alien power cell in a picture from one of the other boxes is still stored in the Roswell complex.

Tex travels to Roswell and enters the deserted site, but whilst moving around the facility becomes increasingly aware that he is being stalked. It is revealed that the alien entity released by the researchers many years before is still lurking in the complex, but Tex is able to seal it off in a containment pod before he suffers that same fate and is then able to secure the power cell from the security room. Tex is able to break the code on a disc Malloy sent to Elijah Witt on which Malloy reveals that each of the boxes sent out contains a piece of the Pandora Device and that assembling the parts will reveal the information Malloy had discovered. After obtaining all the relevant pieces, Tex summons Fitzpatrick, Regan and Witt to his office where he assembles the Pandora Device. A hologram of Malloy appears and tells the group that there was indeed another spacecraft that landed on Earth and that Malloy discovered its location. He hypothesises that the ship contains large amounts of anti-hydrogen on board, and that if this gets into the wrong hands it could result in the destruction of life on Earth. Witt immediately decides that the ship must be destroyed, but Regan is adamant that they could sell the technology off for big money. Regardless, the four decide that they must find the craft so they each take a separate route to the location Malloy specified.

Tex arrives and manages to navigate his way through a dense jungle and an ancient Mayan labyrinth in which he comes across Regan who set off earlier in hope she might get there first. Tex and Regan find the ship, but Jackson Cross arrives and it revealed that Regan and Cross had been working together all along. Before Cross is able to kill Tex, Fitzpatrick emerges from the ship and invites the three on board. Fitzpatrick shows them around and offers to show them the central power core before locking Regan and Cross inside, but not before Cross fires his gun and hits Fitzpatrick. As he is dying, Fitzpatrick reveals that he knows how to work the controls of the ship as his father was one of the aliens from the ship; his mother was a human woman from Nebraska, hence Fitzpatrick's human appearance. After urging Tex to type in the correct controls, he dies from his wound and Tex quickly exits the ship just in time for it to ascend into space and self-destruct. Tex is picked up by a late arriving Elijah Witt and taken home.

=== Endings ===
From this point, several endings are possible depending on how the player made Tex behave throughout the game:

Mission Street:

1. Chelsee returns from Phoenix and invites Tex round for dinner, during which he recounts his tale though she remains skeptical. Afterwards she reveals she is dressed in a square dance outfit and rewards Tex with a striptease.

2. Chelsee and Tex go for a drink at the Brew 'n' Stew. Chelsee reveals that she feels she isn't ready to commit to a relationship so and Tex should just remain good friends. Having signed up to the new 'holodate' service, a hologram of Clark Gable arrives to take Chelsee on a date. A deflated Tex returns to his office and calls the holodate service himself. He speaks to the manager (a hologram of Humphrey Bogart) and requests a two-for-one special date with Jayne Mansfield and Anna Nicole Smith.

Lombard Street

1. Same as Mission Street Ending 2.

2. On the spacecraft when Cross shoots he hits Tex instead of Fitzpatrick. He is able to limp off the ship and sees it explode. Having ruined his chances with Chelsee he decides to give up his career as a P.I. and join the circus as a clown. We see him backstage putting on his makeup before going on, glancing briefly at photograph of Chelsee before sadly leaving the room to perform.

Boulevard of Broken Dreams

1. Same as Lombard Street Ending 2.

2. On the space craft Tex is shot in the leg, but is unable to get off before it self-destructs and dies.

3. Before boarding the ship, Cross will give his gun to Tex and ask him to shoot Fitzpatrick. If the player opts to shoot Cross instead, the gun will be empty and Cross will pull out a loaded gun and shoot Tex dead.

4. If the player chooses to shoot Fitzpatrick, the gun will be empty. Before Cross can shoot Fitzpatrick himself, Tex suggests they go to look on the ship. Fitzpatrick will lock all three of them in the ship's core. Tex is able to unlock the door, but Fitzpatrick will have already begun flying the ship into space. The ship self-destructs and all four characters die.

== Development ==
The Pandora Directive had a budget of more than $4 million.

== Reception ==
Reception

Review scores
Publication	Score
Next Generation	4/5
PC Zone	92/100
PC Games	A−

Awards
Publication	Award
PC Games	Game of the Month
Codie awards	"Best Adventure/Role-Playing Software Game" (finalist)

According to Aaron Conners of Access Software, The Pandora Directive's sales totaled "about 120,000 world-wide".

A reviewer for Next Generation praised The Pandora Directive's all-star cast, three-dimensional interface, storyline, and use of both sight gags and more subtle humor. He criticized that some of the puzzles "are just too difficult, requiring unbelievable stretches of imagination and leaps in logic", but concluded the game overall to be as good as fans of adventure games could hope for. He scored it four out of five stars.

In PC Zone, Chris Anderson called The Pandora Directive "without question the best adventure game of its type". Scorpia of Computer Gaming World likewise praised it as a superior entry in the adventure field. She concluded:

The ability to develop the leader character's personality in certain ways—ways that have a definite, material effect on the conclusion, irrespective of puzzle-solving—is worth the price of admission by itself. This is something you expect in a role-playing game, but rarely if ever see there. To find it in an adventure is amazing, to say the least. So don't let the "interactive movie" label put you off: The Pandora Directive is worthy of your attention, whatever your level of gaming expertise.

The Pandora Directive was named the best adventure game of 1996 by Computer Gaming World and Computer Game Entertainment, and a runner-up for PC Gamer US's and CNET Gamecenter's 1996 "Best Adventure Game" awards, which went respectively to The Beast Within: A Gabriel Knight Mystery and The Neverhood. The editors of Computer Gaming World noted the game's options and several endings as the game's strength. Those of PC Gamer US wrote that The Pandora Directive "may have the best cast ever featured in a PC Game", and that it "tops its predecessor in every way".

Entertainment Weekly gave the game a B+.

In 2011, Adventure Gamers placed it 9th on their list of all-time best adventure games.

== Novelization ==
A novelization of the game was written by Aaron Conners in 1995. It differs slightly in details from the game, but the overall story is the same.

== Related links ==
- The Pandora Directive at MobyGames
