= Code Hero =

- Developer: Primer Labs
- Designer: Alex Peake
- Engine: Unity
- Platforms: Microsoft Windows, macOS
- Release: Cancelled
- Genre: Education
- Mode: Single-player

Code Hero is a cancelled educational video game by Primer Labs, designed by Alex Peake. The game was supposed to teach players how to write programming languages by having them do so in a 3D world.

The game drew controversy following its Kickstarter campaign, when the studio ran out of funds, missed release deadlines and funding rewards, and communicated little with the community. Some financial backers threatened legal action following long periods of no communication.

The Code Hero website was offline for an extended period in 2014, and Peake has not commented publicly about the state of this project since 2013. From May 2015 the website was again inactive, however it resurfaced in August 2016. Following a 2017 update, the game's development ceased entirely.

== Gameplay ==
The main aim of Code Hero is to teach players how to write programming languages in an engaging way. Players use a gun which can copy code and place it in other areas of the level in order to create a full program in a language such as JavaScript and UnityScript whilst moving around a 3D world from a first-person perspective. Players start in a world called Gamebridge Unityversity's API from which they can choose a series of levels which teach basics of the programming languages; after this they move to the Humantheon, from which the player moves on to the rest of the game world, led by a robotic Ada Lovelace.

== Development ==
Development on Code Hero began in January 2011, and in 2012 Peake started a Kickstarter campaign to raise US$100,000 to fund further development of the game over the next six months. The Kickstarter concluded in February having raised US$170,000, at which point US$30,000 had been raised through their website alongside this.

Peake hired a development team, and in March 2012, they began working in space provided by IGN Indie Open House in San Francisco. The project experienced staff turnover, and by October 2012, ran out of money.

After failing to deliver the backing rewards by the original date, and not updating the website or Twitter accounts for months at a time, backers began to demand refunds and became concerned that the project was not sufficiently funded. The original release date of August 31, 2012, at PAX Prime, was missed, with an update a few days later saying it would be released within days, a date which was also missed. When supporter Dustin Deckard began organising to seek legal action after another stretch of no communication, Alex Peake released a statement saying that the game was still being worked on and that Primer Labs was “committed to finishing this game.” The raised funds covered the costs of development until October 2012, after which many of the game's developers became volunteers. Two alpha builds of Code Hero were released during 2012 for those who had pre-ordered the game.

In August 2013 a beta version of the game became available for download on Primer Labs website after being down for a period of weeks. An announcement dated April 22, 2014 indicated that version 0.5 was forthcoming. However, the Primer Labs website again went down later in 2014. The company's Facebook and Twitter accounts have been inactive since 2012.

On November 6, 2015, Primer Labs website re-opened and was being updated, with weekly updates posted during December. The next planned version (0.5) was set for December 1, 2015, but was never made available. The game was last updated in 2017.
