= Radúz Činčera =

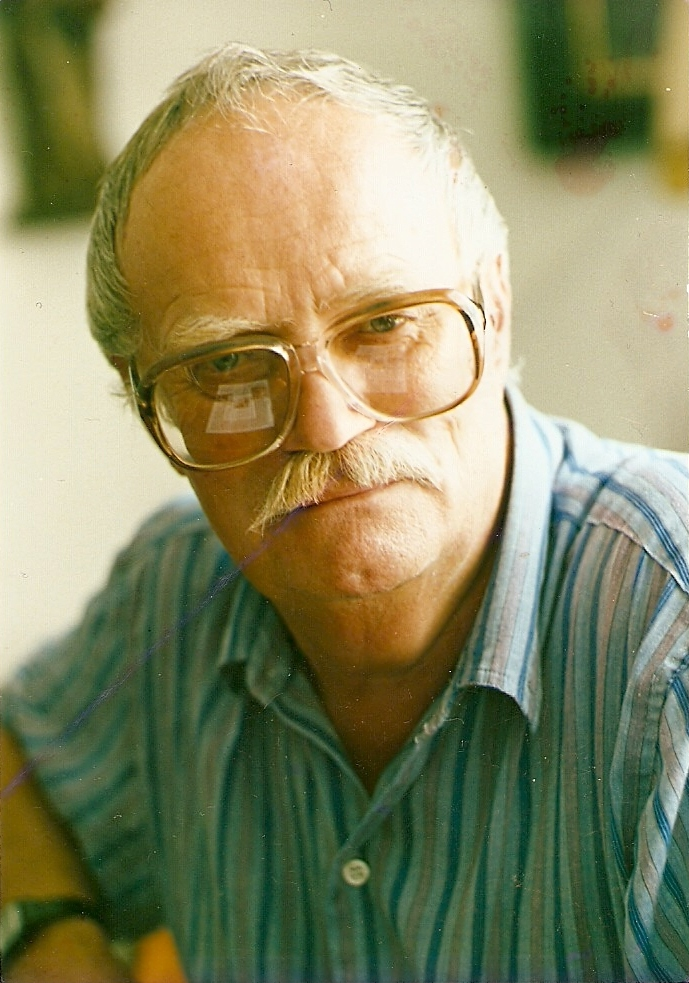
- Dr. Radúz Činčera
- Born: 17 June 1923; Brno, Czechoslovakia
- Died: 28 January 1999 (aged 75)
- Occupations: film director and screenwriter
- Years active: 1954-1998
- Children: 4

Radúz Činčera (17 June 1923, Brno – 28 January 1999, Prague) was a Czech screenwriter and director, the conceiver of the legendary Kinoautomat.

== Career ==
Most of his life he worked in the Krátký film Praha (The Short Film of Prague) movie studio where he was author and director of a series of short documentary films.
Nevertheless, his most famous work is the Kinoautomat, the world's first interactive movie, for the Czechoslovak Pavilion at Expo '67 in Montreal.

Another big project of Radúz Činčera was The Sound Game Show at the Man and His World exhibition in Montreal in 1971. He also astonished the global audience with his audio-visual projects in Kobe, Japan and in Vancouver, British Columbia.
In the second half of the 1980s his multimedia music inscenation of the rock opera The Scroll was extremely successful in Canada.

Like some other Czech artists, Radúz Činčera's artistic and public work was restricted after the Soviet takeover of Czechoslovakia in 1968.

== Filmography ==
Year	Title	Footage	Notes
1954	Kvety Tatier	short	dramaturgic cooperation
1956	Prečo kvitnú	short	director
1964	Romeo a Julie 63	middle	director
1966	Mlha (Documentary on Prague Divadlo Na zábradlí)	short	theme, screenplay, commentary
1966	Kinoautomat Člověk a jeho dům	full-length	theme
1966	Jak Sammy o kalhotky přišel	short	director
1968	Stroskotáme zajtra	short	commentary
1969	Documentary on the last moments of the comic duo Clow and Hamm, made to the 41. anniversary of the first sound film	short	director
1980	O dětech a slovech	short	director
1994	Hudební laboratoř	TV series	director
