= Bob Bejan =

American marketing consultant

Bob Bejan is head of global events, production studios and the marketing community at Microsoft Corporation. Prior to his return to Microsoft, Bejan was the Chief Development Officer of MSLGROUP. He is the co-founder and chairman of PBJS, Inc., an advertising and marketing consulting firm that formed from the merger of Insight Creative and Optimobius, Inc., where he was previously CEO. PBJS, Inc. is now part of MSLGROUP. He also acts on the Board of Advisors for Revenue Science and is on the board of directors for Aptimus, Inc. His career has spanned many types of new media and interactive media, including work at Interfilm, LLC, Microsoft, Virtual Worlds, Inc. and Warner Bros. Interactive Entertainment. He is also a member of the Directors Guild and the Writer's Guild.

== Biography ==
Bejan started in theatre, acquiring a Bachelor of Arts in Theatre Arts from the University of the Pacific. His early work consisted of Broadway performances including a revival of West Side Story and Grease. He also did the voice of Michelangelo on two Teenage Mutant Ninja Turtles albums.

Following work with Bejan/Nelson Entertainment, Inc. and Controlled Entropy Music Inc., Bejan's executive career took off with Virtual Worlds, Inc. There he directed the development of BattleTech Centers, a virtual reality location-based entertainment center. The first of these opened in the North Pier Mall in Chicago before spreading to other locations such as Japan. Following the mixed success of the BattleTech Centers, Bejan was responsible for the founding of Interfilm, Inc. in 1992. Interfilm created the first interactive films. These were displayed in theatres across the United States.

Bejan moved on to Warner Bros. Interactive Entertainment in 1994, where he served as vice president of creative development. He controlled all original programming for the division, including its presence on the Web and America Online. In 1996, Bejan left Warner Bros. to work at Microsoft Corp., where he served as executive producer of MSN for the United States. His role at Microsoft built upon his work at Warner Bros., as he once again was responsible for controlling original programming for his division. Bejan's importance at the company increased as he became General Manager in charge of monetization of advertising and strategic alliances.

In 2003 Bejan left Microsoft and eventually founded Optimus Inc., which later merged with Insight Creative in 2006 to become the advertising and marketing consulting firm PBJS, Inc. PBJS was sold to Publicis. Bejan returned to Microsoft in 2016, handling the company's global events, production studios and marketing community division.
