= Tex Murphy =

- Tex Murphy (played by Chris Jones)
- Genres: Adventure; Mystery; Cyberpunk; Neo-noir
- Developers: Access Software (1989-98); Big Finish Games (2014-present)
- Publishers: Access Software (1989-98); Atlus (2014)
- Platforms: MS-DOS, Commodore 64, Atari ST, Amiga, Windows, OS X
- First release: Mean Streets; 1989
- Latest release: Tesla Effect: A Tex Murphy Adventure; May 7, 2014

Tex Murphy is a series of video games designed by Chris Jones. The eponymous main character is portrayed in live-action by Chris Jones himself. He is characterized as a down-on-his-luck private investigator in a post-nuclear future San Francisco, borrowing tropes from both the film noir and cyberpunk genres.

== Games ==
Aggregate review scores As of August 17, 2013.
Game	GameRankings	Metacritic
Mean Streets	65%	-
Martian Memorandum	75%	-
Under a Killing Moon	85%	-
The Pandora Directive	81%	-
Tex Murphy: Overseer	82%	-
Tesla Effect: A Tex Murphy Adventure	69%	68

=== Mean Streets (1989) ===
Mean Streets is the first game in the Tex Murphy series. Unlike later games in the series, it features segments in a variety of genres, including adventure game sequences, side-scrolling action sequences, and an open-world flight simulator. It was notable at the time as one of the first commercially available games to use 256-color VGA graphics, as well as for its "RealSound" technology that allowed recorded digital audio to be played back without the need for an external sound card.

=== Martian Memorandum (1991) ===
Martian Memorandum continues the Tex Murphy storyline, but features more traditional point-and-click adventure gameplay, with inventory-based puzzles and branching dialog trees. It uses digitized actors and features short bits of video during conversation, hinting at the FMV style employed in later games.

=== Under a Killing Moon (1994) ===
Under a Killing Moon marked a change in direction for the series. Costing over two million dollars and four years of development, it used 3D graphics and full motion video to greatly expand both the gameplay and presentation. Aaron Conners was put in charge of writing duties for the first time, and he re-imagined the Tex character as a down-on-his-luck divorcee, struggling to find work as a private investigator. It featured real-time 3D graphics that were exceptionally detailed at the time, and was one of the first games to take advantage of systems with 16 megabytes of RAM in order to display higher resolution textures.

=== The Pandora Directive (1996) ===
The Pandora Directive is a direct sequel to Under a Killing Moon. It uses the same engine as its predecessor, and features many of the same locations (some newly expanded), particularly on Tex's home street of Chandler Ave. It also features many recurring characters from the previous game, and continues the romantic plot between Tex and Chelsee Bando. It features very similar gameplay to Under a Killing Moon but introduces logic puzzles alongside the inventory and "jigsaw" puzzles of the previous game. It also features a branching storyline, with three main paths and seven unique endings, and allows for multiple solutions to some problems, particularly those involving money.

=== Tex Murphy: Overseer (1998) ===
Overseer is the fifth game in the series, but its story is largely a re-telling of Tex's first big case, previously portrayed in Mean Streets. This story is told through the use of a frame narrative, set after the events of The Pandora Directive, as Tex relates the story of his past to Chelsee. Overseer maintains the gameplay and presentation style of the previous two games, and borrows little from Mean Streets beyond its basic plot. It retcons many details from that game further sharpening the divide between the early games in the series and the live-action games. Overseer was developed to showcase the nascent DVD-ROM format, and was the first game developed to specifically take advantage of DVD. Produced on an accelerated schedule, it was somewhat more limited in scope than The Pandora Directive, without the branching paths and multiple endings. Access hoped that Overseer would serve to set up a proper sequel to Pandora and ended the game on a cliffhanger that remained unresolved for over 15 years.

=== Tesla Effect: A Tex Murphy Adventure (2014) ===
Tesla Effect is the sixth game in the series and a true sequel to The Pandora Directive, while also continuing from the fifth title Overseer. It continues in the style of the previous titles, making heavy use of live-action FMV, as well as first-person exploration and investigation of 3D environments. It once again returns the series to Chandler Ave and features many of the same characters and locations featured in Under a Killing Moon and The Pandora Directive. It also features multiple paths and endings like Pandora.

=== The Poisoned Pawn ===
The Poisoned Pawn was to be the seventh game in the series. The game originally began as a fan-made remake of the 5th title in the Tex Murphy series Overseer, and its development was sanctioned by Big Finish Games in early 2015. However, due to increased traction in the game's development, as well as significant technological advancements, the project evolved into an official canon continuation of the Tex Murphy series. The development team was streamlined and partnered with the series' owner (Big Finish Games). Aaron Conners (series writer) came on board, writing all-new content for the game, which would have continued the story after the events of Tesla Effect, and taking place in the year 2050. While the foundation of the games' story was still centered around the Overseer plot, Tex (with the assistance of St. Germaine) would have revisited various parts of all of his prior cases in order to decipher his true past, and prepare him for an uncertain future. The Poisoned Pawn refers to the original title that was given to Overseer, before a name change was decided internally prior to its 1998 release. The game was ultimately cancelled in April 2021 due to creative differences.

== Setting ==
The games in the Tex Murphy series take place in a post-apocalyptic 21st century. All of the games take place mostly in a post-WWIII San Francisco. The skies glow red with radiation, and people who don't live in a better-sheltered city or lack genetic immunity to the radiation are disfigured and usually repulsive. Several San Francisco landmarks are still present, such as the Golden Gate Bridge, Coit Tower and Alcatraz, but most of them are completely abandoned; most damaged beyond repair from bombs in WWIII. The futuristic aspect borrows heavily from sci-fi books and films, most notably Blade Runner for its flying cars and impossibly dense tenements.

== The character ==
Tex Murphy is a hard-boiled PI. Tex is a member of the portion of the population born without any genetic defects making him a normal human (referred by in-game characters as a "Norm"). He is an avid fan of the classic film noir films of Humphrey Bogart. As such, he does his work in the style of archetypal film noir detectives such as Sam Spade and Philip Marlowe. He has remarkable skills of observation (always punctuated with humorous internal monologues); when examining objects or features, he hardly ever misses an important or unusual detail. However, he is also occasionally a bit clumsy and naive which gets him into trouble from time to time, as does his sarcastic wit.

Tex is honest and generally a good-natured fellow who suffers from a bad back, a little too much alcohol (Bourbon...neat, preferred) and a few too many blows to the head. He runs his private investigation business out of his apartment at the Ritz Hotel on Chandler Avenue in Old San Francisco "among the mutants and the destitute" where several businesses and friends reside, including his love interest, the mysteriously mutated newspaper stand owner Chelsee Bando.

In 2011, NowGamer ranked him as the eighth-best game detective, calling him "the epitome of the hard boiled flatfoot detective", but wondering why he "dress[es] like a cross between an alcoholic Indiana Jones and Deckard from Blade Runner".

== Radio theater ==
When plans for a new game fell through, Chris Jones and Aaron Conners, produced a series of audio dramas in 2001, to continue the storyline. The radio theater stars several of the original characters and voices from the games, including Jones as Tex Murphy. They were financed out-of-pocket by the creators and released for free as digital downloads. These episodes continue to be available through the unofficial Tex Murphy website. A new series of six more episodes were made to accompany the then-upcoming Project Fedora as a reward for qualifying backers.

== Novelizations ==
Aaron Conners has published five Tex Murphy novels, with a planned sixth announced. The first three are fairly direct novelizations of their corresponding games. The fourth incorporates both original story elements and elements of Tex Murphy: Overseer and was meant as the basis for a planned remake of that title that was ultimately cancelled in 2021. A fifth novel, Tex Murphy and the Romanov Enigma was released in 2024, telling a new story, not based on an existing game.

- Under a Killing Moon (1996)
- The Pandora Directive (1995)
- Tesla Effect: A Tex Murphy Adventure (2014)
- Tex Murphy and the Poisoned Pawn (2021)
- Tex Murphy and the Romanov Enigma (2024)

The novels follow the same story as the games but differ somewhat in detail. The Poisoned Pawn incorporates elements of Overseer (itself based on Mean Streets) but serves to retcon certain elements, and replaced the frame narrative of Tex and Chelsea's first date with one set shortly after the events of Tesla Effect involving Count St. Germaine. The Romanov Enigma is a new story set chronologically between the Pandora Directive and Tesla Effect novels, and is not based on any existing games. However, some of the events of the novel were previously covered in the Tex Murphy Radio Theater audio dramas that the developers had previously released.

Conners has announced one more novel following The Romanov Enigma, an entirely original story that will conclude the series, calling it "Tex's last ride into the sunset."

== History ==
The Tex Murphy character was first created for the amateur film Plan 10 from Outer Space, created by Chris Jones and other members of Access Software. Following the development of their flight game Echelon they wanted to create another 3D flight game that cast players in the role of the futuristic private investigator. Eventually, adventure and action elements emerged, eclipsing the still-present flight sim sequences. Mean Streets would be noted for its use of high-color VGA graphics, digitized actors, and for its "Real Sound" technology, which allowed waveforms to be played back on the PC's speaker without the use of a sound card.

For the sequel, Access developed a more traditional point and click adventure game, Martian Memorandum. Like Mean Streets it featured digitized actors, including Chris Jones as Tex, and featured a great deal more digitized voice. Martian Memorandum also introduced dialog trees to the series, which would continue to be a prominent element.

The third title in the series spent nearly four years in development, and represented the company's most ambitious game to date. Under a Killing Moon shipped on a previously unheard-of four CD-ROMs, and featured full voiceover and hours of cut scenes and dialog featuring live actors. Unlike many games using full motion video, however, it also featured high-end real-time 3D graphics and explorable environments unlike anything previously seen in the genre. Under a Killing Moon was widely praised for its use of technology, and represented the series' commercial peak.

For the next game, Access re-used the engine and technology they had developed for Under a Killing Moon, but hired Hollywood director Adrian Carr to direct the game's video sequences and improve the storytelling and presentation. It also introduced narrative "pathing" wherein moral choices made throughout the game affect the story, and eventually the ending, in a manner similar to later games by BioWare. Although The Pandora Directive was well received by fans and critics, it was unable to replicate the financial success of its predecessor.

Access' plans for a sequel eventually evolved into plans for a trilogy, but these plans were scrapped when Intel approached Access about creating a game to demonstrate new DVD technology they were working on. To accommodate the accelerated schedule needed for the project, Access shifted their plans to a re-telling of Mean Streets, done in the style of the later games in the series, and stripped away many gameplay elements. When Intel dropped the project, Access spent 3 months expanding the game's interactive elements and making it into a "full featured" title. They shipped the title themselves as Tex Murphy: Overseer. The game was met with mixed reviews, and would mark the end of the series for well over a decade.

=== Hiatus and revival ===
Shortly after the release of Tex Murphy: Overseer in 1998, Access Software was sold to Microsoft. By this point in time, the adventure genre was in sharp decline, and Microsoft was more interested in having the studio develop sports titles. Several Tex Murphy games were proposed during this time in a variety of genres, but none ever entered production. Access was later sold to Take-Two Interactive, and then closed down in 2006. In 2007, series leads Chris Jones and Aaron Conners formed a new studio, Big Finish Games, in Salt Lake City, and by 2009 had re-acquired the rights to the series.

Big Finish updated the main page of their site in April 2009 with an announcement of "Tex Murphy - Project Fedora" as a future release. This led to much speculation amongst the Tex Murphy fanbase that a new project in the form of a game was in the works as the fedora is a signature component of Tex's outfit, especially in light of the fact that this announcement coincided with the news that the rights to the series had been secured.

In June 2009, Good Old Games re-released the first three games in the series as downloadable titles and put the last two into the "coming soon" section. The fourth game followed on June 30, and the fifth on July 21. Some of the releases use DOSbox to maintain compatibility with modern operating systems. Five years later, a collection of Tex Murphy games were re-released on Steam as part of a collaboration between Big Finish Games and Night Dive Studios.

In 2012, Big Finish Games launched Kickstarter campaign for "Tex Murphy - Project Fedora", starting on May 15, with a goal of $450,000, to be supplemented by an additional $300,000 from Big Finish. This goal was met on June 7, and the campaign eventually raised $657,196, including PayPal donations. Production began in June. The game's official name was later revealed as Tesla Effect: A Tex Murphy Adventure.

In May 2016, Big Finish Games began their official partnership with the development collective Chaotic Fusion, for the development of the seventh game in the series The Poisoned Pawn. The game was in production for several years, but was ultimately cancelled in April 2021 due to creative differences.

The Guinness World Records awarded Longest-running graphic adventure protagonist to Guybrush Threepwood (from the Monkey Island series), after his character was recognized for spanning the period between October 15, 1990 and December 8, 2009 (a total of 19 years and 54 days). Tex Murphy was listed as another contender (having spanned 24 years and 121 days between the published release dates of Mean Streets (video game) and Tesla Effect), but he was disqualified because the Guinness rules categorized the latest game as a revival because of the length of the hiatus. However, in an apparent contradiction to this disqualification, Guinness World Records also awarded Longest wait for a sequel to a point n click adventure to Tales of Monkey Island.

== Video documentary ==
In December 2017, Big Finish Games released a documentary on the Tex Murphy franchise. The video was originally a Kickstarter backer incentive for Tesla Effect: A Tex Murphy Adventure, but was made available to the general public via YouTube. The 45-minute video provides a detailed insight into the history and development of the Tex Murphy character and game series. It also features interviews with many of the series' original creators, including behind the scenes video content from when the Access Software company was formed, all the way through to the Tesla Effect Kickstarter campaign.
