= Kinoautomat =

1967 Czechoslovak film

Kinoautomat: One Man and His House
- Directed by: Radúz Činčera; Ján Roháč; Vladimír Svitáček
- Written by: Pavel Juráček; Radúz Činčera; Miroslav Horníček; Ján Roháč; Vladimír Svitáček
- Produced by: Ladislav Kalas
- Starring: Miroslav Horníček
- Cinematography: Jaromír Šofr
- Edited by: Miroslav Hájek
- Music by: Evžen Illín
- Release date: 23 June 1967
- Running time: 63 minutes
- Country: Czechoslovakia
- Language: Czech

Kinoautomat was the world's first interactive movie, conceived by Radúz Činčera for the Czechoslovak Pavilion at Expo 67 in Montreal, Quebec, Canada. At nine points during the film the action stops, and a moderator appears on stage to ask the audience to choose between two scenes; following an audience vote, the chosen scene is played.

The film is a black comedy, opening with a flash-forward to a scene in which Petr Novák (Miroslav Horníček)'s apartment is in flames. No matter what choices are made, the result is the burning building, making the film—as Činčera intended—a satire of democracy. Other interpretations are that the film is a satire of determinism, the idea that human beings control their fate, or that the film is an endorsement of acceptance of the diversity and complexity of life. The latter would be in keeping with other statements of late 1960s culture which questioned social structure and authority.

== Expo 67 screening ==
The version presented in Montreal had been dubbed into English in London, and was subtitled One Man and his House. The production took place in a custom-built cinema, with buttons installed on each of the 127 seats, one green and one red. The lead actor (Horníček) performed the moderator's role phonetically, since he spoke no English. As the audience cast their vote, the result of each choice was displayed on the perimeter of the screen, with a numbered panel corresponding to each seat turning red or green according to the button pressed. The interactive element was achieved by switching a lens cap between two synchronised projectors, each with a different cut of the film.

== Reception ==
The project was well received, with The New Yorker writing: "The Kinoautomat in the Czechoslovak Pavilion is a guaranteed hit of the World Exposition, and the Czechs should build a monument to the man who conceived the idea, Radúz Činčera." Initially, Hollywood studios were keen to license the technology, but under the Communist government the Kinoautomat concept was the property of the state, and never made the transition.

In 1972, less than a year after a successful run in Prague, the film was banned by the ruling Communist Party of Czechoslovakia. Činčera's daughter, Alena Činčerová, suggests that "all this group of authors was so-called 'politically unconfident', they didn't like them so much and I think that was the main reason the film was put in the safe, like many other beautiful films from the so-called New Wave era, the golden era, of Czech cinematography."

== Interactivity ==
The screenplay was written such that the two plot-lines converged at each decision point, meaning that there were only ever two possible scenes, instead of double the number after each decision point. Decades after the original screening, the film was broadcast on Czech television, with the two reels split across channels ČT1 and ČT2, revealing the secret of limited interactivity. Činčera, who had turned down the screening initially, was later quoted insisting "they felt cheated. I was right. It was a complete disaster."

Choices given to the audience at decision points throughout the film include:

- Whether Mr. Novak should let in a woman, locked out of her apartment and clad only in a towel, just before his wife arrives home.
- Whether Mr. Novak should ignore a policeman flagging him down while driving.
- Whether Mr. Novak should rush into an apartment despite a tenant blocking his way.
- Whether Mr. Novak should knock out a porter blocking his way when trying to point out a small fire.

== References in other works ==
In the 2012 novel The Fourth Wall, author Walter Jon Williams's plot revolves around a modern Hollywood film having similar viewer choice among plotlines. At one point, Williams' main characters watch and discuss the Kinoautomat, claiming that the limited interactivity was intended as political commentary on the rigged elections under communist rule.

== Screenings ==
- 1967, Expo 67, Montreal, Quebec, Canada
- 1968, HemisFair '68, San Antonio, United States
- 1971, Kino Světozor, Prague, Czechoslovakia
- 1974, Expo '74, Spokane, United States
- 2006 (February), National Film Theatre, London, England (part of the Pavel Juráček season)
- 2007 (May–June), Kino Světozor, Prague, Czech Republic
- 2009 (March), Tyneside Cinema, Newcastle Upon Tyne, England (part of the Clicks or Mortar? event)
- 2009 (April), Filmfest DC, Washington, DC, United States
- 2012 (September), Vilnius Film Shorts (VILNIAUS KINO ŠORTAI), Vilnius, Lithuania
- 2019 (February), Unicon, Trnava, Slovakia
