= Big Finish Games =

American video game developer

- Type: Private
- Industry: Video games
- Founded: 2007
- Headquarters: Salt Lake City, United States
- Key people: Chris Jones; Aaron Conners
- Products: List of Big Finish Games
- Website: Official website

Big Finish Games is an American independent game developer formed by members of Access Software/Indie Built following the company's closure in 2007. The company was founded with the goal of developing story-driven, interactive games. The company's debut production, Three Cards to Midnight, was released on May 7, 2009.

The company reunites the creative team of Chris Jones and Aaron Conners, perhaps best known for their work on the Tex Murphy series of adventure games for Access Software, as well as many other veterans of the Tex Murphy series, including Brian Johnson, Douglas Vandegrift, and Matt Heider.

== History and following ==
Most of Big Finish Games' team were members of Access Software, a company known for its diverse lineup of games, including the popular Tex Murphy series of adventure games. When the company was purchased by Microsoft (and later 2K Games), their focus was narrowed to sports games and the company was renamed to Indie Built. After Indie Built was closed, they decided that "the time was right to take the plunge back into the adventure game genre".

The company has hoped to target the enduring fan base of the Tex Murphy series, while also welcoming a more casual audience that is usually intimidated by adventure games. Conners has stated that in the longer term, Big Finish aimed to develop story-based games in a number of genres. The company acquired the rights to the Tex Murphy series, and expressed an intent to revive the character. In 2012, Big Finish Games launched a Kickstarter campaign for Tex Murphy - Project Fedora, which was successfully funded on June 16. The game would ultimately change its name and was finally released as Tesla Effect: A Tex Murphy Adventure on May 7, 2014.

== Games developed ==
- 2009: Three Cards to Midnight
- 2010: Three Cards to Dead Time
- 2011: Murder Island: Secret of Tantalus
- 2011: Escape from Thunder Island
- 2012: Rita James and the Race to Shangri La
- 2014: Tesla Effect: A Tex Murphy Adventure
