= Under a Killing Moon =

1994 video game

- Developer: Access Software
- Publishers: NA: Access Software; EU: U.S. Gold
- Director: David F. Brown
- Designers: Aaron Conners; Chris Jones
- Programmer: Bruce Ward
- Artists: Neil Galloway; Nathan Larsen
- Writer: Aaron Conners
- Composers: Larry Bastian; Jon Clark; Eric Heberling
- Series: Tex Murphy
- Platforms: MS-DOS, Classic Mac OS
- Release: NA: October 27, 1994; EU: November 10, 1994; NA: 1995 (Mac)
- Genres: Point-and-click adventure, Interactive movie
- Mode: Single-player

Under a Killing Moon is a 1994 point-and-click adventure and interactive movie released for MS-DOS and Classic Mac OS. It is the third installment in the Tex Murphy series of adventure games produced by Access Software. The detective Tex Murphy finds himself unwittingly involved in the affairs of a dangerous cult.

== Gameplay ==
Exploration scenes use 3D graphics.

Under a Killing Moon dramatically shifted the gameplay of its predecessors in the series by fully utilizing interactive 3D environments. The player controls the protagonist Tex from a first-person perspective. The virtual world allows full freedom of movement, and as such allows the player to look for clues in every nook and cranny. It was also the first Tex Murphy game to stray from the traditional adventure game dialogue format of providing options that showed exactly what the player's character would say. Instead, descriptions of the dialogue choices were given, providing some mystery to what Tex would say.

== Plot ==
Under a Killing Moon takes place in post-World War III San Francisco in December 2042. After the devastating events of the nuclear war, many major cities have been rebuilt (as is the case with New San Francisco), though certain areas still remain as they were before the war (as in Old San Francisco). The war also left another mark on the world: the formation of two classes of citizens. Specifically, some people have developed a natural resistance against radioactivity, and thus are normal or "Norms" – everybody else is a Mutant in some form. Tensions between the two groups have risen dramatically and Norms and Mutants usually do not get along. The Mutants are usually forced to live in the run-down areas of cities such as Old San Francisco. Tex Murphy lives on Chandler Avenue in Old San Francisco. All his friends are Mutants, though he is a Norm.

In Under a Killing Moon, Tex Murphy, a private investigator, has hit rock bottom. Recently divorced from his wife Sylvia, out of work, low on cash, and living in a run-down part of Old San Francisco, Tex realizes that he has to get his act together. Tex sets out to hunt for work. He finds it quickly once he discovers that the pawnshop across the street from his apartment has been burglarized. Tex quickly solves the case, and feels his luck has begun to change. Then a mysterious woman calling herself Countess Renier, having heard good things about Tex, hires him to find her missing statuette. Everything seems great at first and the Countess is promising to pay Tex more money than he has seen in his life. However, everything quickly goes downhill when Tex finds out about a doomsday plot by a deadly cult calling themselves the Brotherhood of Purity.

== Development and release ==
Under a Killing Moon was one of the largest video games of its era, with a budget between $2 million and $3 million, and arriving on four CD-ROMs (although some material was duplicated among the four to reduce the amount of swapping). The game combined full motion video (FMV) cutscenes with an advanced 3D virtual world to explore. Though action games with 3D environments and a first-person perspective had been popularized by first-person shooters such as Doom, it was very unusual at the time to see these characteristics used in an adventure game. It is notable that the game's 3D graphics did not use ray casting techniques like Doom, but true texture-mapped polygons that allowed players to look in all directions as well as duck, and ran in then-high resolutions of up to 640x480. The designers Chris Jones and Aaron Conners recalled they went to their programmers and said that they wanted the 3D movement of Wolfenstein, but also wanted to look closer to the quality of pre-rendered graphics of The 7th Guest.

The game was originally released on October 31, 1994. After its creators reacquired the rights to the series, it was re-released on Good Old Games in June 2009.

== Reception ==
=== Sales ===
Following Under a Killing Moon's launch in late 1994, market research firm PC Data named it the United States' fifth-best-selling computer game of November. The game's overall sales had reached 400,000 copies before the release of Tex Murphy: The Pandora Directive in 1996. At the time, Access reported that it had "broken all Access Software sales records".

=== Critical reviews ===
Reception

Review scores
Publication	Score
Adventure Gamers	4.5/5
Computer Gaming World	3/5
IGN	9.0
Next Generation	4/5
PC Gamer (US)	92%
Entertainment Weekly	C-

Under a Killing Moon received universally positive reviews. Contemporary reviews praised the game for its technology and cinematic presentation. In 2002, Adventure Gamers gave it a score of 4.5 out of 5, praising a mystery plot, characters and a classic Tex Murphy humor. According to IGN in 2006, the game has weathered the test of time and called it as one of the best detective games of all time. IGN also called it "a landmark for adventure games" and "a rebirth for the series", using new technology to create a game that was both cinematic and playable.

The game was reviewed for Entertainment Weekly. The review contrasts it with Blown Away, calling both imperfect experiments at merging Hollywood filmmaking with computer games. According to the reviewer, Under a Killing Moon offers ambitious and engaging game mechanics with expansive exploration and puzzles, yet suffers from flat storytelling, weak pacing, and unremarkable performances despite its well-known cast. The reviewer concludes that each title is appealing mainly to established gamers and falling short of reaching a broader audience.

Next Generation reviewed the PC version of the game, rating it four stars out of five.

James V. Trunzo reviewed Under a Killing Moon in White Wolf Inphobia #55 (May, 1995), rating it a 4 out of 5 and stated that "Under a Killing Moon isn't perfect. However, for the most part it's very enjoyable. It also shows where computer gaming is headed - definitely in the right direction."

Computer Gaming World ranked it as the 99th in the magazine's 1996 list of the best computer games of all time for the "campy humor combined with amazing 3D scenery in this futuristic film noir". In 2011, Adventure Gamers placed it 25th on their list of all-time best adventure games.

Under a Killing Moon won the' Codie awards 1994 "Best Fantasy Role Playing/Adventure Program" prize.

== Reviews ==
- White Wolf Inphobia #55 (May 1995)

== Novelization ==
A novelization of Under a Killing Moon was written by the game's original writer Aaron Conners in 1996. Although the basic plot, characters, and setting remain mostly the same, it differs significantly from the game, providing a great deal of extra information, new characters, character deaths, and more detailed character motivations related to the main plot involving the Moonchild, while removing scenes and characters from the game that did not relate to the Moonchild plot, creating a more singular Chandler-esque mystery novel. The final ending of the game (meeting The Colonel and Eva in the bar, and dancing lessons with Delores Lightbody) is also changed to continue this style.
