= Bryan Brandenburg =

American author and former game programmer

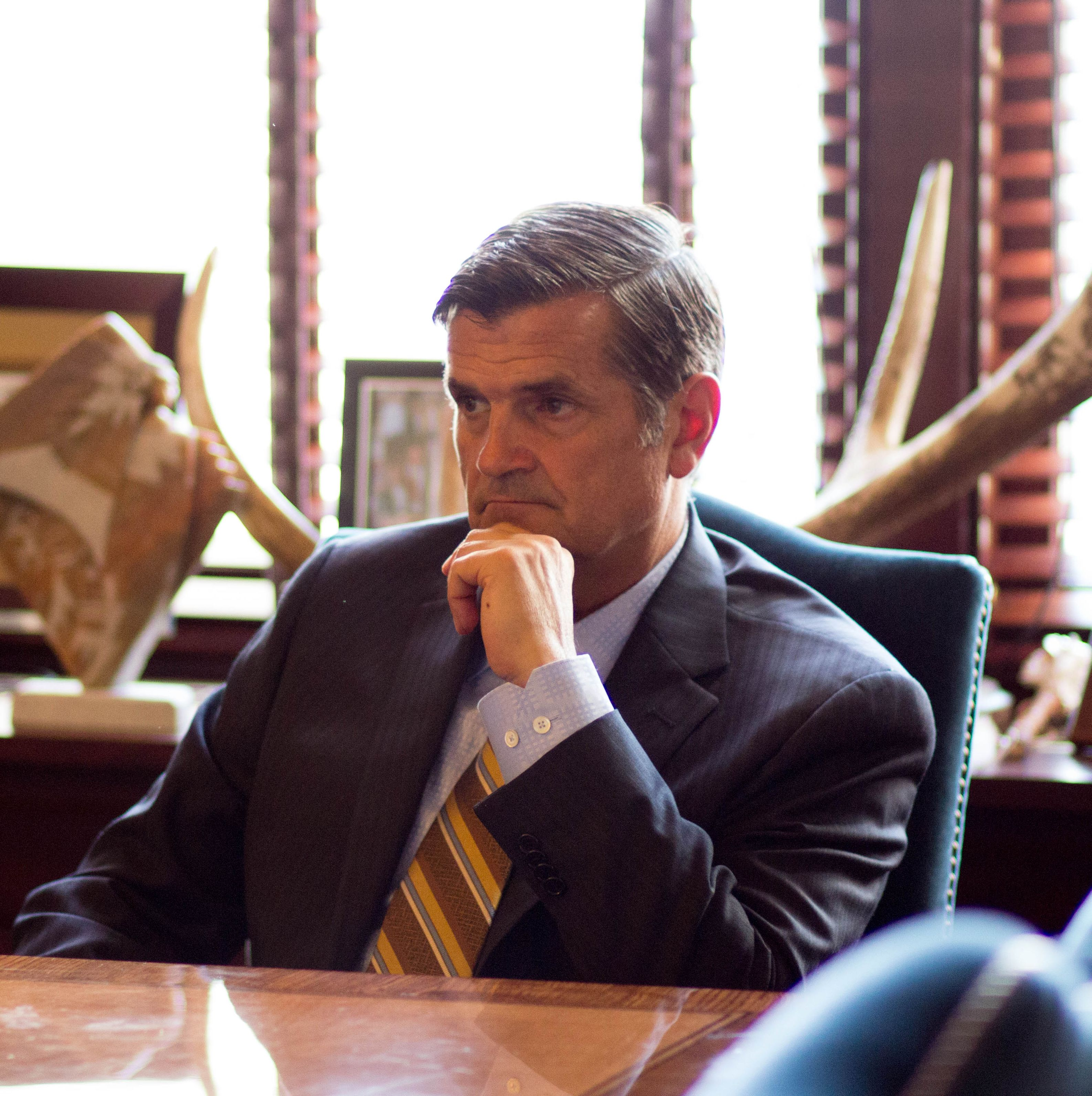
Bryan Brandenburg

Bryan Brandenburg (born February 18, 1959, in Châteauroux, France) is a biophysicist, author, technology entrepreneur and former game programmer. Brandenburg is best known as co-founder of Zenerchi, Sculptured Software and Salt Lake Comic Con and Executive Producer at Engineering Animation

== Career ==
After completing his studies in mathematics and physics in 1982, Brandenburg began programming 3D video games on the Commodore 64, Apple II and later IBM PC compatibles and Amiga.

Brandenburg started several technology companies that were later acquired by private and public corporations. In 1984, he co-founded Sculptured Software and led the company as President. The company was eventually sold for almost US$40 million after producing dozens of games for the Commodore 64, Atari ST, Amiga, IBM PC and Apple II.

In 1994, Brandenburg started the game company Software Arts International which was acquired in 1996 by Engineering Animation. He was the Executive Producer for the public company's Interactive Division, producing games for Disney, Mattel, Hasbro Interactive, and Sierra On-Line.

In 1999, Bryan Brandenburg partnered with Karl Malone to build a media-centric outdoors media company (Amazing Outdoors) with websites, a television show, a radio program, a monthly magazine (Utah Outdoors), and a book publishing arm. The company was acquired in 2001.

Brandenburg was an executive officer of Daz 3D, a 3D content company and launched Bryce in July 2004. In January 2005, he was recruited as the CEO of Zygote Media Group and launched Male Anatomy Collection 2.0, the 3DScience.com website, Female Anatomy Collection 3.0 and Zygote Heart 3.0. In 2006, Brandenburg partnered with Content Paradise produce a current 3D model of the Solar System including planets, moons, and asteroid field.

Brandenburg is the co-founder of Salt Lake Comic Con, later renamed FanX. As Chief Marketing Officer, he announced a global partnership with PopLife Entertainment, the company that distributes the big-headed Funko Pop! figures in Asia, to bring FanX events to China, Thailand and the Philippines. In November 2017, he was inducted in the Honorary Commander program for the 419th Fighter Wing at Hill Air Force Base. Brandenburg stepped aside in May 2018 in response to criticism of how he handled a sexual harassment complaint that took place between Dan Farr and Richard Paul Evans. He returned after a brief absence in the Fall of 2018.

In 2019, Bryan Brandenburg announced Zenerchi, a biomedical simulation and visualization AI company after raising $1.2 million in seed funding. Brandenburg announced an international partnership with Pop Life Global in December 2019 to produce a series of exhibitions called The Human Xperience. Brandenburg sold his shares in FanX in 2019.

== Bomb threats ==
In May 2022, Brandenburg was arrested in Hawaii and charged with emailing multiple bomb threats.

Utah's 3rd District Court documents indicate Brandenburg was unhappy with court delays in his ongoing divorce. After several emailed exchanges with court employees, Brandenburg began making threats to "bomb the city."

According to the FBI, on May 4, 2022, Brandenburg "sent emails to people in Utah threatening to bomb the 3rd District Courthouse, the State Capitol, the Mayor's office, every Ivy League School, and the Federal Courthouse in San Diego." Court documents show that on May 6, 2022, Brandenburg emailed Utah media outlets threatening to bomb the University of Utah campus. He claimed that "Hall Labs is Frankenstein Inc. They put illegal medical devices in me without my knowledge or permission with the U of U Center for Medical Innovation. We’re bombing both campuses today for crimes against humanity.”

=== Conviction ===
On July 21, 2023, a federal jury in Hawaii found Brandenburg guilty of seven counts of sending e-mail threats to bomb buildings in the State of Utah and across the United States. U.S. District Judge Leslie E. Kobayshi ordered Brandenburg's detention pending sentencing. In September 2024, Brandenburg was sentenced to 70 months in federal prison followed by one year of supervised release.

== Software contributions ==
- Trophy Buck (Windows)
- Outburst (Windows)
- Bryce (Windows/Mac)
- Clue (Windows)
- Crime Wave (MS-DOS)
- World Class Leader Board (Amiga)
- Leader Board (Amiga)
- Echelon (MS-DOS)
- Ninja (MS-DOS)
- Raid Over Moscow (Apple II)
- Beach Head II (Apple II)
- Sentinel (Commodore 64)
- A Bug's Life (Windows)
- DAZ/Studio (Windows/Mac)

== Published print media ==
- Become a 3D Art Professional
- Million Dollar Computer Consultant
