= Beachhead (disambiguation) =

A beachhead is the line created when a military unit reaches a beach by sea and begins to defend that area of beach.

Beachhead or Beach Head may also refer to:

- Beachhead (film) a 1954 film starring Tony Curtis and Frank Lovejoy
- "Beachhead" (Stargate SG-1), a Stargate SG-1 episode
- Beach Head (G.I. Joe), a fictional character in the G.I. Joe universe
- Beach Head (video game), a 1983 video game
  - Beach Head II: The Dictator Strikes Back, a 1985 sequel to the video game
- Games developed by Digital Fusion Inc.
  - Beach Head 2000, a remake of the 1983 game
  - Beach Head 2002
- Beachhead (board game), a 1980 board wargame from Yaquinto

== See also ==
- Beachy Head, a chalk headland in East Sussex, England
