= 10th Frame =

1986 video game

- Developer: Access Software
- Publisher: U.S. Gold
- Platforms: Amstrad CPC, Atari ST, Commodore 64, MS-DOS, MSX, ZX Spectrum
- Release: NA: 1986
- Genre: Sports
- Mode: Single-player

10th Frame is a ten-pin bowling sports video game published by Access Software in 1986. Up to eight players can take part in open bowling or a tournament. It was released for the Amstrad CPC, Atari ST, Commodore 64, IBM PC compatibles, MSX, and ZX Spectrum.

== Gameplay ==
Gameplay screenshot (Atari ST)

The lane is viewed from behind the bowler, with the pins towards the top of the screen in a 3D perspective.

The scorecard for the current player is displayed above the lane. The player can move left or right on the lane before starting the run-up by holding fire. A target cursor can be moved by pushing up and then moving it left or right (pressing down returned control to moving the onscreen player's position).

Once the fire button is held, a power meter similar to Leader Board's is used. The speed of the shot is determined by how long the button is held down. A small zone at the top determines if the player makes an error, exaggerating any spin.

When the meter starts to descend on the right, it is stopped in the hook zone to determine how much hook/spin is applied—from straight at the top of the zone to full hook at the bottom. Play is completed after the usual ten frames and any bonus balls.

Players can print out a scorecard at the end of a match.

There is a choice of three difficulty levels: Kids (in which the ball always goes straight), Amateur, and Professional.

== Reception ==
Reception

Review scores
Publication	Score
C&VG	9/10
Zzap!64	85%
Your Sinclair	7/10

Computer and Video Games reviewed the Commodore 64 version in issue 65 and called it a Game of the Month with a 9/10 score. Zzap!64 awarded the game 85% in issue 22, calling it "another slick and extremely well programmed Access sport simulation". Your Sinclair gave the ZX Spectrum conversion 7 out of 10, stating that "10th Frame requires a lot of skill and is a pretty good simulation".

Rick Teverbaugh reviewed the game for Computer Gaming World, and stated that "Tenth Frame is on my top 10 sports games list of all-time and I think it will be on yours also."
