= Leaderboard =

Leaderboard may refer to:

- Leader Board, a golf video game series
- Game ladder or ladder tournament, a form of tournament for games and sports
- High score, in a video game
- Leaderboard, a standard web banner size
- League table, a chart or table listing leaders in a competition
