= Raid over Moscow =

1984 video game

Raid Over Moscow
- Developer: Access Software
- Publishers: NA: Access Software; EU: U.S. Gold
- Designer: Bruce Carver
- Platforms: Amiga, Amstrad CPC, Apple II, Atari 8-bit, BBC Micro, Commodore 64, Plus/4, ZX Spectrum
- Release: 1984 (C64); 1985–1986 (ports); 2020–2022 (new ports)
- Genre: Action
- Mode: Single-player

Raid Over Moscow (Raid in some countries and on reissue) is a video game by Access Software published in Europe by U.S. Gold for the Commodore 64 in 1984 and other microcomputers in 1985–1986.

Originally released during a critical time of the Cold War era, Raid Over Moscow is an action game in which the player (an American space pilot) has to stop three Soviet nuclear attacks on North America, then fight his way into and destroy a nuclear facility located in Moscow's Kremlin. According to the game's storyline, the United States is unable to respond to the attack directly due to the dismantlement of its nuclear arsenal.

A member of the Finnish parliament made it a parliamentary question about whether it was acceptable to sell the game. The resulting debate and publicity made the game a top seller in the country.

== Gameplay ==
=== First stage ===
Screen shot from the Commodore 64 version showing early gameplay

The game opens with an alert that a nuclear missile has been launched from a Soviet city towards a North American city. The game begins in the hangar where the American spaceplanes are stored. The player has to safely fly the craft out. The view switches to the earth as seen from low Earth orbit, and the player guides the spaceplane to the city launching the attack. Alternatively, the player may decide to maneuver more of the available spaceplanes out of the space station before attacking the launch site; the surplus planes are docked outside the space station. Meanwhile, the clock is ticking, and the time before impact is continually displayed.

First stage gameplay (Atari 8-bit)

The player has then to fly through the defense perimeter around the launch site missile silo, dodging obstacles, heat-seeking missiles, and Soviet tanks and planes. If successful, the player proceeds to the next screen; otherwise, the player has to start the next life back at the hangar, with the clock still ticking. However, should the player have spare spaceplanes parked outside the space station, the game continues with a new life on the current screen, skipping the flight from space station to the launch site. The decision to launch more than a single spaceplane first may therefore save time if the player later loses a life.

The final part of this stage involves destroying the missile silo while avoiding Soviet planes trying to shoot down the player. Destroying the primary missile silo in the center before the missile lands will thwart the attack. Destroying the secondary silos on either side of the primary earns extra lives and points.

The Soviets launched a total of four missile attacks, from Leningrad, Kiev, Minsk, and Saratov, all of which must be stopped in the same manner as the first. After the fourth launch, the player progresses to the second stage of the game.

=== Second stage ===
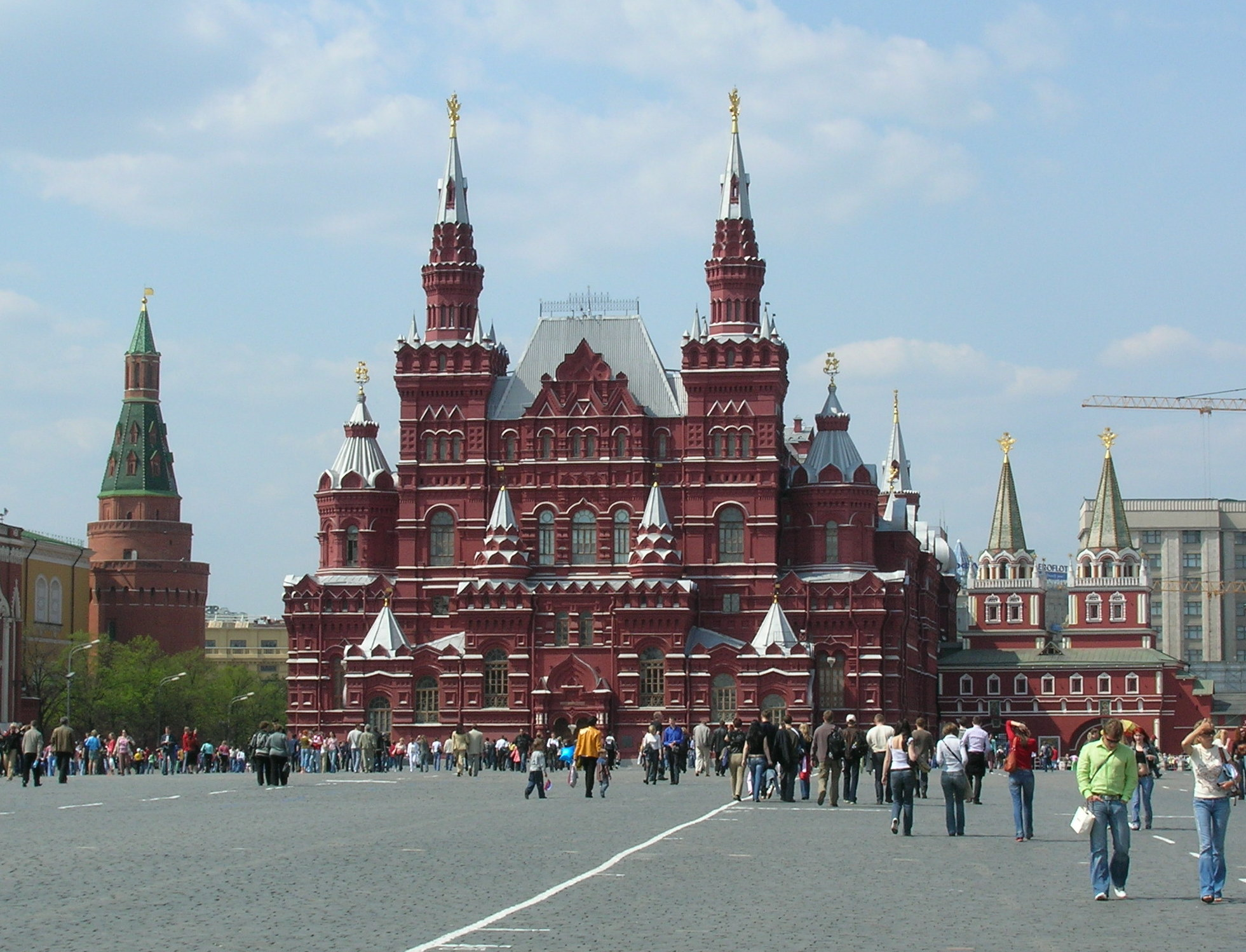
The State Historical Museum is used as a backdrop in the second stage of the game.

The pilots become foot soldiers and are placed outside the front facade of the "Defence Centre", depicted as the State Historical Museum. Using a mortar they must blast open the correct door to the facility, randomly chosen from five available. Bonus points can be gained from this section by destroying parts of the building and defeating the troops stationed there. Once the door is open, the soldiers make their way to the nuclear reactor, and the final stage of the game.

=== Third stage ===
In this stage, the player has to destroy maintenance robots that feed coolant into the reactor. The number of robots is determined by the difficulty level chosen by the player. The player is provided with several disc grenades that he throws at the robot, which is moving and firing at him the entire time. The robot is reinforced at the front, so the only way to do any damage is to bounce the discs off the wall and hit the robot in the back. As the number of discs is limited, the player should attempt to catch returning discs that missed the robot. To complete the game, all robots must be defeated, the final one within a two-minute time limit. If the robot is not destroyed within the limit the game is still considered complete, but with no survivors.

== Releases ==
The game was first published for the Commodore 64 with Amstrad CPC, Apple II, Atari 8-bit computers, BBC Micro, and ZX Spectrum versions following. Upon reissue the game was retitled to Raid.

An Amiga port was in development in the late 1980s but was canceled along with Beach Head and Beach Head II: The Dictator Strikes Back when the developers were unable to secure a deal with the publisher, U.S. Gold. According to the graphical artist Adrian Cummings, the graphics were at that point "99.9% complete". However, the coding was barely started. An Amiga port was finally released in 2020 by Reimagine Games, with programming by Erik Hogan who started from scratch to create this new conversion.

== Reception ==
Reception

Award
Publication	Award
Crash	Smash!

Raid over Moscow was Access' second best-selling Commodore game as of late 1987, after Beach-Head. The game received generally positive reviews. Computer and Video Games praised the graphics and sound of the Commodore 64 version, while Crash gave the ZX Spectrum version an overall score of 92%. The theme of the game, nuclear war, was subject to questioning, however, with Computer and Video Games publishing several letters from readers arguing for and against its publication.

Unauthorized copies of Raid on Moscow circulated widely in East Germany during the 1980s, despite the Stasi describing it as among those games having "a particularly militaristic and inhumane nature". The West German Federal Department for Media Harmful to Young Persons added the game to its index in 1985, stating that "In older adolescents, playing ... can lead to physical tension, anger, aggressiveness, agitated thinking, difficulty concentrating, headaches, etc." The ban automatically ended in 2010.

=== Political crisis in Finland ===
The game was shortly presented in YLE's current affairs television program A-studio on 13 February 1985 after being reviewed by the computer magazine MikroBitti. On 20 February 1985 the leftist newspaper Tiedonantaja published an article which criticized the review and called a ban on all similar "anti-USSR" games. Parliament member Ensio Laine (SKDL) left a parliamentary question for the Finnish government on the next day.

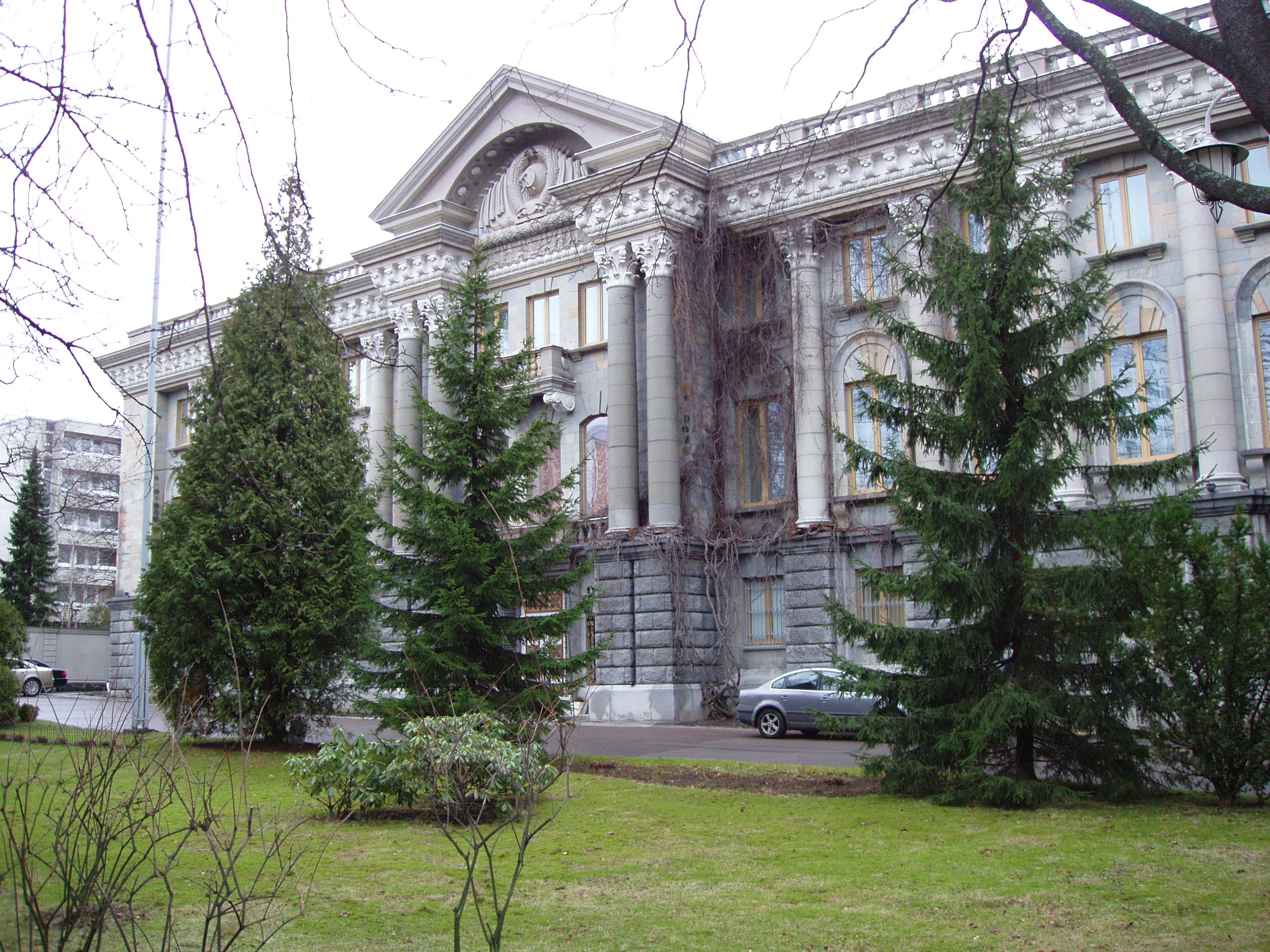
The Soviet embassy at Tehtaankatu, Helsinki was the scene of the discussions concerning the game.

The following days included various discussions between the Finnish foreign ministry and Soviet Union representatives. On 7 March 1985, the Soviets sent a petition asking for a ban on various books, articles and other media, including Raid Over Moscow, which it claimed presented a distorted view of the Soviet Union. Nevertheless, on 14 March 1985, the Minister of foreign trade Jermu Laine answered the parliamentary question, claiming that the Finnish legislation only allowed to restrict the importation of products that pose a hazard to health. The foreign ministry thus was able to dodge possible claims of Finlandization by referring to unsuitable legislation. Finally, the Minister of foreign affairs Paavo Väyrynen gave an official answer to the petition on 11 April 1985, expressing a friendly attitude towards the USSR and apologizing on behalf of negative publications about the country in the media. The USSR interpreted the game as military propaganda, but settled on the answer.

As a result of the public debate, the game was the top-selling Commodore 64 game in Finland from March to September 1985 according to MikroBitti. The full extent of the affair was unveiled in 2010, when the Finnish foreign ministry memos were declassified.
