= Soft metal =

Soft metal may refer to:

== Materials science ==
- A metal or alloy with low hardness
- A metal or alloy with high malleability

== See also ==
- Hard metal (disambiguation)
- Light metal, a metal with low density
