= Heavy metal =

Heavy metal may refer to:

- Heavy metals, a loose category of relatively dense metals and metalloids
  - Toxic heavy metal, any heavy metal chemical element of environmental concern
- Heavy metal music, a genre of rock music
  - Heavy metal genres
- Heavy Metal (magazine), an American fantasy comic book magazine

== People ==
- Heavy Metal (wrestler) (Erick Francisco Casas Ruiz, born 1970), Mexican professional wrestler
- "Heavy Metal" Van Hammer (Mark Hildreth, born 1967), American former professional wrestler

== Fictional characters ==
- Heavy Metal (G.I. Joe), a character in the G.I. Joe universe
- Heavy Metal (Marvel Comics), a team of supervillains in the Marvel Universe
- Heavy Metal (Ninjago), a character in Ninjago

== Songs and albums ==
- "Heavy Metal (Takin' a Ride)", a 1981 song by Don Felder from the soundtrack of Heavy Metal
- "Heavy Metal", a 1981 song by Sammy Hagar from the album Standing Hampton, also on the soundtrack of Heavy Metal
- "Heavy Metal: The Black and Silver", a 1981 song by Blue Öyster Cult from Fire of Unknown Origin
- "Heavy Metal", a 1985 song by Helloween from Walls of Jericho
- "Heavy Metal", a 1988 song by Judas Priest from Ram It Down
- "Heavy Metal", a 2005 song by Clap Your Hands Say Yeah from Clap Your Hands Say Yeah
- "Heavy Metal", a 2016 song by Justice from Woman
- "Heavy Metal", a single by Madi Diaz from Fatal Optimist
- "Heavy Metal x DVNO", a 2018 song by Justice from Woman Worldwide
- Heavy Metal Music (album), a 2013 album by Newsted
- Heavy Metal (album), a 2024 album by Cameron Winter

== Video games ==
- Heavy Metal (1988 video game), by Access Software
- Heavy Metal: F.A.K.K. 2, a 2000 computer game by Gathering of Developers
- Heavy Metal: Geomatrix, a 2001 arcade game for Sega NAOMI and Dreamcast by Capcom
- HeavyMetal, a series of commercial software titles designed to complement Classic BattleTech
- Transformers: Heavy Metal, a cancelled geolocation game based on Hasbro's Transformers sci-fi franchise

== Film and television ==
=== Films ===
- Heavy Metal (film), a 1981 animated film based on the magazine
- Heavy Metal 2000, a.k.a. Heavy Metal: F.A.K.K.² or Heavy Metal 2, a 2000 animated film, sequel to the 1981 film Heavy Metal

=== Television episodes ===
- "Heavy Metal", Auf Wiedersehen, Pet series 3, episode 2 (2002)
- "Heavy Metal", CSI: Vegas season 3, episode 9 (2024)
- "Heavy Metal", Gary and His Demons season 1, episode 11 (2018)
- "Heavy Metal" (Sliders), season 5, episode 14 (1999)
- "Heavy Metal", Superman: The Animated Series season 2, episode 23 (1997)
- "Heavy Metal" (Terminator: The Sarah Connor Chronicles), season 1, episode 4 (2008)
- "Heavy Metal", The Curse of Oak Island season 6, episode 18 (2019)
- "Heavy Metal", The New Leave It to Beaver season 2, episode 5 (1986)
- "Heavy Metal", Water Rats season 5, episode 17 (2000)
- "Heavy Metal", Yu-Gi-Oh! Zexal season 2, episode 3 (2012)

== Literature ==
- Heavy Metal: A Tank Company's Battle to Baghdad, a 2005 book about Operation Iraqi Freedom
- Heavy Metal: How a Global Corporation Poisoned Kodaikanal, a 2023 book by Ameer Shahul
- Métal hurlant, also called "Heavy Metal", a French comic book

== Other uses ==
- Heavy Metal (cricket), an incident in a 1979 cricket match involving Dennis Lillee

== See also ==
- Hard metal (disambiguation)
- Heavy rock (disambiguation)
