= Crime Wave =

Crime wave or crimewave may refer to:

- An increase, or perception of an increase, in crime in a particular period and place

== Film and television ==
- Crime Wave (1954 film), an American film noir
- Crime Wave (1985 film), a Canadian surrealist comedy
- Crimewave, a 1985 American comedy directed by Sam Raimi
- Crime Wave (2018 film), a Spanish black comedy directed by Gracia Querejeta
- "Crime Wave" (CSI: Miami), a 2004 TV episode
- "Crime Waves", a 2001 episode of The Zeta Project
- "The Crime Wave", a 2016 episode of Plebs

== Video games ==
- CrimeWave, a 1996 vehicular combat game
- Crime Wave (video game), a 1990 video game by Access Software

== Other uses ==
- Crime Wave (book), a 1999 collection of short works by James Ellroy
- "Crimewave" (song), a 2007 song by Crystal Castles and Health
- Crime Wave, an independent music label created by Cam'ron
