= Bruce Carver =

Video game designer and programmer

- Born: Bruce Eugene Carver; May 4, 1948; Montpelier, Idaho, US
- Died: December 28, 2005 (aged 57); Salt Lake City, Utah, US
- Resting place: Bountiful, Utah, United States
- Occupations: Entrepreneur, video game developer, home construction
- Known for: Access Software; Carver Homes

Bruce Eugene Carver (May 4, 1948 – December 28, 2005) was a co-founder of Access Software (later renamed Indie Built) in 1982. It began by producing titles for 8-bit computers, including Beach-Head, Beach Head II: The Dictator Strikes Back, Raid over Moscow and many others.

== Career ==
A mechanical engineer, Carver began programming as a hobby after purchasing a Commodore 64 in early 1982, and founded Access Software. After Carver published Beach Head and Raid over Moscow, Compute! in 1985 called him one of "the world's best computer game designers" and a peer of Chris Crawford, Bill Budge, and Dan Bunten. With his brother Roger, he created the influential Links golf game series, beginning with Leader Board and World Class Leader Board. The Links games defined golf video games and simulations. In 1997, PC Gamer named him one of the "Gods of Gaming".

Access was sold to Microsoft in 1999 and, as a result, several people were let go. Carver paid generous golden parachutes to several of these people out of his own pocket. He continued to work on games until 2003 when he left to create a construction company, Carver Homes, and collaborate with other former Access employees in the golf simulator company TruGolf. Carver was most active with his construction company, which built luxury houses to order. The homes were often outfitted with the TruGolf system.

== Family and death ==
On December 28, 2005, Carver died of cancer. His funeral was held in Salt Lake City, Utah. He left a wife and seven children.
