= Amped 3 =

2005 video game

- Developer: Indie Built
- Publisher: 2K
- Designer: Chris Olson
- Artist: Jared Bastian
- Writer: Aaron Conners
- Composer: Matt Heider
- Platform: Xbox 360
- Release: NA: November 22, 2005; EU: December 2, 2005; AU: March 23, 2006
- Genre: Snowboarding
- Modes: Single-player, multiplayer

Amped 3 is a snowboarding video game, the third and final installment of the Amped sports game franchise, developed by Indie Built published by 2K and released exclusively for the Xbox 360 in 2005. It expands on previous versions of the Xbox exclusive games. It has also been noted for taking a more irreverent tone than previous installments, such as the inclusion of challenges in which two players compete to amass the most injuries, and for its unique cut-scenes using different visual media, from hand puppets to anime.

== Gameplay ==
Amped 3 features several ski resorts with a variety of challenges in addition to the main story. Completing these challenges earns the player respect points and money. In addition, certain challenges unlock new clothing, gear, tricks, and music. These challenges include media call-outs that require the player to perform a certain type of trick, timed runs, sled and snowmobile challenges, races that require the player to collect a certain number of objects within a set time, and challenges that require the player to beat a professional snowboarder. Gaining respect points allows the player to unlock new areas of the mountain and advance the main story.

The game has a single-player story mode, while having 2-player minigames throughout. No online content or play, other than a high-score leaderboard, is available.

== Plot ==
The game begins at Northstar at Tahoe, with the main character "Player 1" dressed in a pink bunny suit heading up the mountain with friends Wienerboy, Sebastian, J Dawg, and Hunter. Player 1 snowboards down the mountain and takes a big drop off of a cliff. Once there, Player 1 meets Dandelion, a snow goddess with a passion for scrap-booking. From here, the player can can choose Player 1's gender and appearance.

As the story progresses, it is revealed that Player 1 and his crew are saving up for a vacation to a ski resort in Chile. After completing several training challenges, Player 1 and his crew participate in an Easter Egg Roll to earn more money for their vacation fund. After saving Wienerboy from a trio of mysterious thugs, the player follows them to see what they are up to. During the chase J Dawg confronts Player 1 and accuses him of stealing the vacation money from Hunter's locker. The rest of the crew heads to Chile, while Player 1 tries to earn money to replace the stolen funds.

As the story moves to Snowbird, Player 1 accepts several jobs for a marketing company. These jobs require the player to perform several dangerous stunts. After the marketing company decides to relocate, Player 1 meets up with his friend Roman who suggests he try out for the ski patrol. After making some more money, Roman sets up Player 1 with a new job: taking pictures of celebrity Berlin Sheridan on her snowboard trip. Player 1 manages to avoid Sheridan's bodyguards and makes enough money to replace the stolen vacation fund.

The story cuts to a news report of a comet on a collision course with Earth. Another reporter cuts in to share Player 1's photos of Berlin Sheridan in embarrassing positions during her trip.

Player 1 makes it to Valle Nevado and sets out to investigate what happened to his friends. He finds out they were selected for sponsorship by a company called Colonotronic Arts Inc. Player 1 reunites with Wienerboy first and finds out he was rejected by C.A.I. Next, he meets up with Sebastian who was sent by H.R. to assist in Player 1's "re-orientation." Player 1 destroys Sebastian's laptop, breaking C.A.I.'s influence over him. Sebastian directs Player 1 to Laax Resort where Hunter has been sent to recruit more minions for Colonotronic Arts. The cut-scenes reveal that a villain named Baron von Havoc is behind this, as he seeks to create a game called Emag Live.

Upon arriving at Laax, Player 1 confronts Hunter and beats her in two snowboarding challenges. The crew discovers that J Dawg has been made a part of a boy band whose music contains subliminal messages. Player 1 manages to stop J Dawg's concert before it broadcasts its message around the world.

Once J Dawg has been rescued, the crew meets up with Dandelion again. She informs them that she stole their vacation fund and framed Player 1 for it so the crew would be split up and would not fall under Baron von Havoc's mind control. The crew makes their way to Havoc's zeppelin and stops his plan.

The ending shows a musical number featuring the main characters in the story. At the song's conclusion, the comet hits the Earth, destroys everything and ending the game.

== Development ==
The game was showcased at E3 2005.

== Reception ==
Reception

Aggregate score
Aggregator	Score
Metacritic	72/100

Review scores
Publication	Score
1Up.com	B−
Edge	7/10
Electronic Gaming Monthly	8/10
Eurogamer	6/10
Game Informer	8.5/10
GamePro	3/5
GameRevolution	C+
GameSpot	7.6/10
GameSpy	3.5/5
GameTrailers	7.1/10
GameZone	7.1/10
IGN	6.9/10
Official Xbox Magazine (US)	8/10
Detroit Free Press	3/4
The Sydney Morning Herald	4/5

The game received "average" reviews according to the review aggregation website Metacritic.

== Awards ==
In GameSpot's Best & Worst of 2005 awards, Amped 3 won Most Outrageous Game, and was nominated for Best Licensed Music, Best Story, Best New Character (for Buck Wad), Funniest Game, and Best Alternative Sports Game.
