= Amped: Freestyle Snowboarding =

2001 video game

- Developer: Salt Lake Games Studio
- Publisher: Microsoft Game Studios
- Director: Brenner Adams
- Designer: Carl Schnurr
- Programmer: Lynn Eggli
- Artist: Brian Johnson
- Platform: Xbox
- Release: NA: November 20, 2001; EU: March 14, 2002
- Genre: Snowboarding
- Modes: Single-player, multiplayer

Amped: Freestyle Snowboarding is an snowboarding video game developed by Salt Lake Games Studio and published by Microsoft Game Studios. It is the first of the Amped video game series and was released as a launch title for the Xbox.

Released during the Xbox's launch, Amped is a snowboarding game focused on the tricks, instead of the racing style of play given by Electronic Arts SSX which launched with the PlayStation 2 in the previous year. The success of Amped was solidified by the successful launch of the sequels Amped 2 and Amped 3.

== Gameplay ==
Utilizing the Xbox's built-in hard drive, Amped allowed for entire mountains to be loaded simultaneously, permitting completely free-style runs modelled on real resorts, rather than the linear courses of other snowboarding titles.

The game also contains snowmen which players must strike down in order to advance their Career Mode characters' exploration options.

The Xbox's built-in hard drive also allows users to create a custom soundtrack using their own music, as well as listening to the 150-plus tracks already offered in the game. Users can also listen to music by genre.

The game is also well known for helping to launch the career of pop punk band Yellowcard due to the in-game soundtrack consisting of the complete One for the Kids album on it. The video game also contains three songs from band Ink & Dagger's album The Fine Art of Original Sin.

As well, the game's instruction manual is written in a magazine-like format.

== Lawsuit ==
Before its release, the game was met with derision from some due to Microsoft's marketing department Photoshopping lens flares onto what were supposedly actual game screenshots. Microsoft claimed they were unintentionally passed off as screenshots of the actual game.

In 2005, former Ink & Dagger drummer Ryan McLaughlin sued Microsoft, claiming that three of their songs were used without the band's knowledge. The suit was settled out of court in 2006.

== Reception ==
Reception

Aggregate score
Aggregator	Score
Metacritic	78/100

Review scores
Publication	Score
AllGame	3/5
Edge	8/10
Electronic Gaming Monthly	6.5/10
Famitsu	29/40
Game Informer	7/10
GamePro	4/5
GameSpot	6.7/10
GameSpy	86%
GameZone	8.9/10
IGN	8.5/10
Next Generation	4/5
Official Xbox Magazine (US)	8.4/10
The Cincinnati Enquirer	4/5

The game received "generally favorable reviews" according to the review aggregation website Metacritic. NextGen said, "While the game still has a few small issues – some minor collision problems, for example – it really is the first next-generation game to 'get' what snowboarding is all about." In Japan, where the game was retitled for release as Tenku: Freestyle Snowboarding (天空 -Tenku- Freestyle Snowboarding, Tenkū -Tenku- Furīsutairu Sunōbōdingu) on February 22, 2002, Famitsu gave it a score of one eight and three sevens for a total of 29 out of 40.
