= Salt Palace =

Convention center in Salt Lake City, Utah, U.S.

Calvin L. Rampton Salt Palace Convention Center
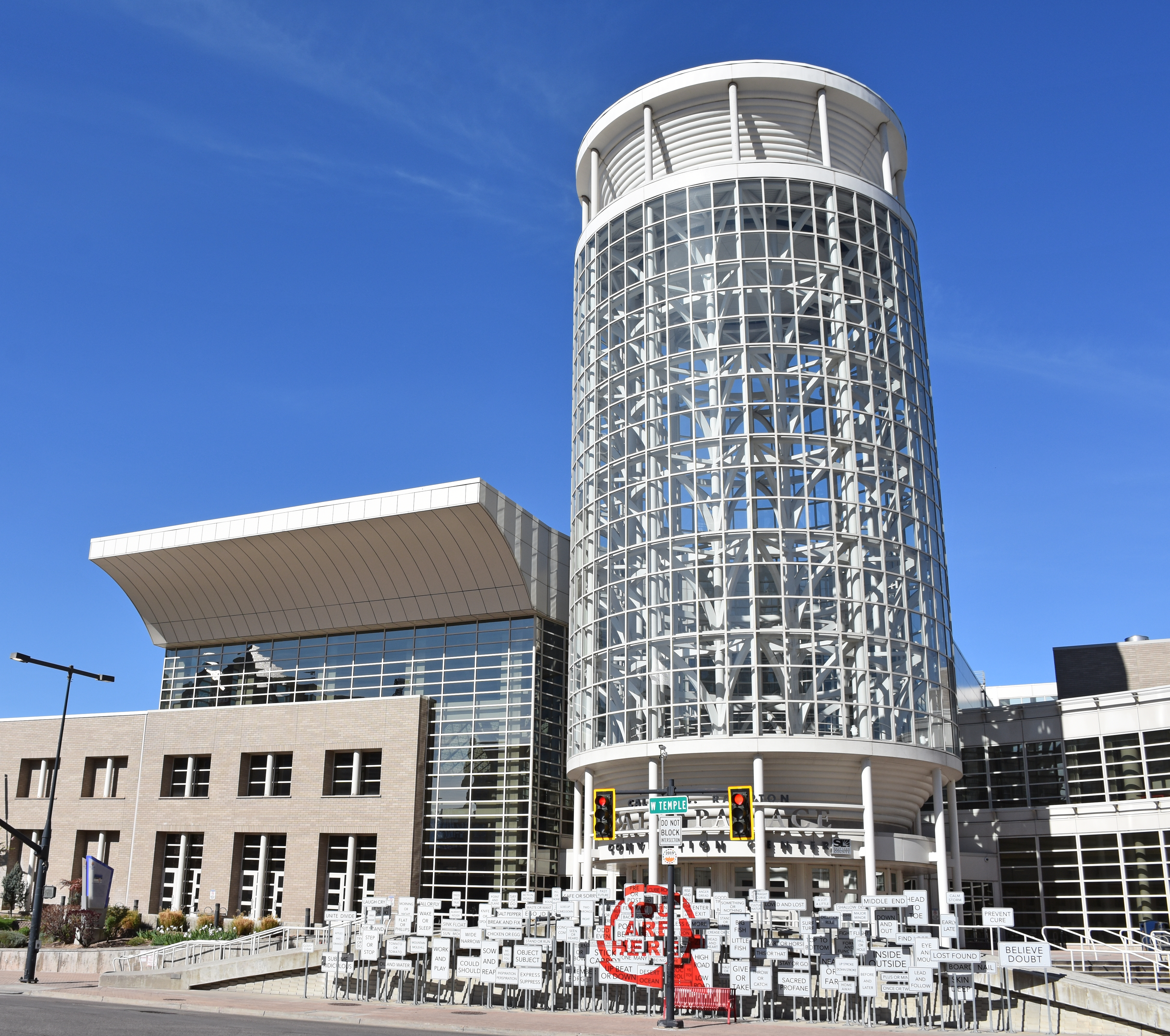
- Main entrance on West Temple in 2024

- Location in Utah Location in the United States Location in North America
- Interactive map of Calvin L. Rampton Salt Palace Convention Center
- Location: 100 South West Temple, Salt Lake City, Utah, U.S.
- Coordinates: 40°46′1″N 111°53′42″W
- Owner: Salt Lake County
- Public transit: Temple Square station

Construction
- Built: 1994–1996
- Opened: February 1996; 30 years ago
- Expanded: 1999–2000; 2005–2006
- Cost: $93 million USD

Tenants
- (of previous building at this location); Utah Stars (ABA) (1970–1975); Utah Jazz (NBA) (1979–1991); Salt Lake Golden Eagles (IHL) (1969–1991)

The Calvin L. Rampton Salt Palace Convention Center, more commonly known as the Salt Palace, is a convention center in Salt Lake City, Utah, United States. Named after Utah's 11th governor, Calvin L. Rampton, the moniker "Salt Palace" was previously used by two other venues in the city.

The convention center was opened in February 1996, after two years of construction. The building was used as the Main Media Center during the 2002 Winter Olympics and is used for regular conventions held in the city, such as FanX, RootsTech, and the Outdoor Retailers convention.

As of 2026, the center is expected to close in 2027 for a complete demolition and replacement, estimated to take three years.

== Previous Salt Palaces ==
=== First Salt Palace (1899–1910) ===
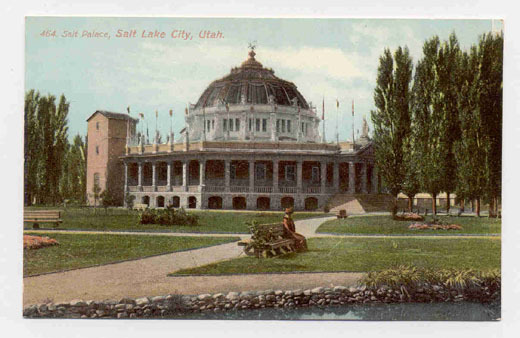
Postcard of First Salt Palace

The original Salt Palace was built in 1899 under the direction of Richard K. A. Kletting, architect, and owned by John Franklin Heath. It stood on 900 South, between State Street and Main Street in Salt Lake City. The Salt Palace was a frame structure covered by large pieces of rock salt, which gave it its name. The Palace had a large dome and was lit at night with hundreds of light bulbs. The building held a theater and was the centerpiece of an amusement park that included a dance hall, a bandstand, a bicycle racing track, rides, and other amusements. The Salt Palace and some of the other elements of the park were destroyed by fire on August 29, 1910.

=== Second Salt Palace (arena) (1969–1994) ===
The second Salt Palace in Salt Lake City was an arena in use from 1969 to 1994, hosting among other events the home games of the Utah Stars and Utah Jazz basketball teams, and the Salt Lake Golden Eagles ice hockey team. Janet Jackson's Rhythm Nation Tour became the fastest sell-out in Salt Palace history. Tickets for the June 18, 1990, concert were sold out in a record 1 hour and 20 minutes after the box office opened. A 1991 concert by rock band AC/DC resulted in three deaths and many injuries when the audience rushed towards the stage and trampled or trapped people. The arena was demolished in 1994.

== Calvin L. Rampton Salt Palace Convention Center (1996–present) ==
Interior photographs

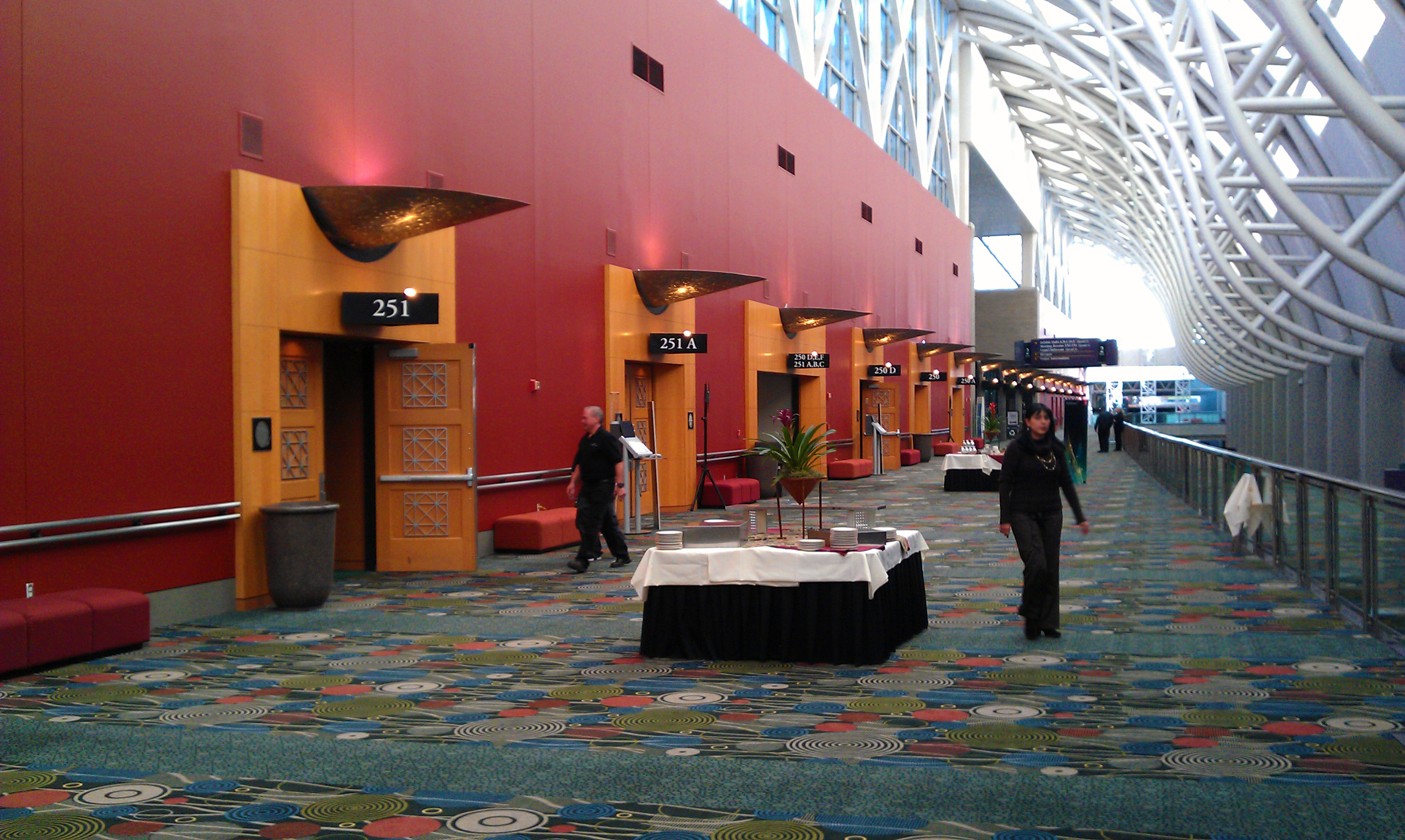
Conference room hallway

Ground was broken for the current Salt Palace on April 27, 1994. Built on the site of the demolished arena, (Note: The second Salt Palace's exhibit addition—above 200 West and along South Temple—was not demolished, but was integrated into the third Salt Palace.) the current convention center boasts 515,000 square feet (47,800 m^{2}) of exhibit space, 164,000 square feet (15,200 m^{2}) of meeting space including a 45,000-square-foot (4,200 m^{2}) grand ballroom, and 66 meeting rooms. The Salt Palace served as the Olympic Media Center during the 2002 Winter Olympics.

In 1997, the Salt Lake Tribune published a front-page exposé about how the construction of the Salt Palace had been hastened by the county geologist who erased the Warm Springs Fault from earthquake maps of Salt Lake City so that the downtown area appeared to be free of faults, enabling the convention center developers to avoid the time and expense of an earthquake hazard and risk assessment. The newspaper showed that the Warm Springs Fault runs north–south along W. Temple, directly adjacent to Temple Square and the convention center. A year later, a fault segment was found at the southern edge of the convention center, and expansion plans were halted until more earthquake fault studies could be completed. In June 1999, the expansion started back up after an independent geotechnical firm analyzed the expansion area and found no earthquake fault. However, in 2021, a federal study found that two earthquake faults intersect near the Salt Palace, with possible quake magnitude of 7.5, which would greatly increase quake damage.

In honor of the "founding father" of Salt Lake's convention and tourism business, as well as Utah's proactive economic development efforts, the Salt Lake County Council voted to officially change the name of the Salt Palace Convention Center to the Calvin L. Rampton Salt Palace Convention Center in the fall of 2007. Much of the property on which the center was built belonged to The Church of Jesus Christ of Latter-day Saints and was leased by the county beginning in the 1960s. In 2016, the Church sold the 10 acres (4.0 ha) of land to the county, for a heavily discounted price.

FanX, the biannual comic book convention, has been held at the Salt Palace Convention Center since September 2013. An annual family history and technology conference known as RootsTech is also held in the Salt Palace.

A Republican presidential debate hosted by Fox News was scheduled to take place at the Salt Palace Convention Center on March 21, 2016. The event was cancelled after Donald Trump said he would not participate and fellow candidate John Kasich said he would not debate without Trump.

A small public park formerly occupied the southeast corner of the building's lot but was closed in 2020 to build an attached hotel. The 700-room hotel, known as the Hyatt Regency Salt Lake City, opened in October 2022.

=== Replacement ===
In early 2024, the Utah State Legislature and Smith Entertainment Group (owner of the Utah Jazz and Utah Mammoth), released details concerning a conceptual sports and entertainment redevelopment project in downtown Salt Lake City. Supported by recently-passed state legislation titled the "Capitol City Reinvestment Zone," Salt Lake City's government created the city's "Sports, Entertainment, Culture, and Convention District" (SECC District) in October 2024. As part of the district's creation, sales tax in the city was increased to finance redevelopment within the district's boundaries, including improvements to the Salt Palace.

In 2025, the Salt Lake County Council voted to sell 6.5 acres (2.6 ha) of Salt Palace property to Smith Entertainment Group, on which the company will build a mixed-use development as part of its revitalization of the neighboring Delta Center. The sale will close in February 2027, after which demolition of the sections of the convention center on the newly transferred property will be demolished.

As of 2026, the county plans to reconstruct the portion of the Salt Palace it retained. This will require closure of the entire remaining facility beginning in fall 2027, with demolition and subsequent reconstruction estimated to take three years.

=== Solar panels ===
On May 24, 2012, a 1.65 MW solar array was completed on the roof. Covering an area of 3.85 acres (15,600 m^{2}), at the time it was the largest solar array in Utah. It is expected to provide 17% of the electricity used by the Salt Palace.

== Notes ==
Events and tenants
Preceded by Louisiana Superdome	Home of the Utah Jazz; 1979–1991	Succeeded by Delta Center
Preceded by Los Angeles Memorial Sports Arena	Home of the Utah Stars; 1970–1975	Succeeded by Last arena
