= FanX =

Comic-book convention in Salt Lake City

Coordinates: 40°36′7.812″N 111°53′0.7794″W

FanX Salt Lake
- Status: Active
- Genre: Multi-genre
- Venue: Salt Palace Convention Center
- Locations: Salt Lake City, Utah
- Country: United States
- Inaugurated: September 5, 2013
- Founders: Dan Farr; Bryan Brandenburg
- Most recent: September 26, 2026; 39 days ago
- Next event: March 11, 2027; 4 months' time
- Attendance: 127,000 (September 2015)
- Organizer: Dan Farr Productions
- Filing status: For-profit
- Website: www.fanxsaltlake.com

FanX Salt Lake (formerly Salt Lake Comic Con) is an annual multi-genre pop culture expo held in Salt Lake City, Utah, United States. It is produced by Dan Farr and Bryan Brandenburg under Dan Farr Productions and is Utah's most attended convention according to the Governor's Office of Economic Development. The first convention took place at the Salt Palace Convention Center in Salt Lake City. The second event, Salt Lake Comic Con FanXperience, was inaugurated in April 2014.

== History ==
The first Salt Lake Comic Con was held September 5–7, 2013 and included special guests including Adam West, William Shatner, and Stan Lee with attendance over 70,000. People attended with ticket sales that exceeded 50,000. Salt Lake Comic Con FanXperience, the first of two Salt Lake comic conventions in 2014, took place on April 17–19, 2014. FanXperience was attended by over 100,000 people.

On July 25, 2014, San Diego Comic-Con sent Dan Farr Productions a cease and desist letter over the use of the term "Comic Con." Convention organizers responded with a press release citing their legal position and unwillingness to comply to the cease and desist letter. In December 2017, a San Diego jury found San Diego Comic-Con does hold a trademark on the term "Comic Con," but also found Salt Lake organizers Dan Farr and Bryan Brandenburg did not willfully or intentionally violate it. They awarded SDCC $20,000 in damages, less than the $12 million the non-profit wanted. Subsequently, Farr and Brandenburg re-branded the convention under the name FanX. On January 16, 2018, Farr and Brandenburg filed a motion for a new trial.

In March 2016, Dan Farr Productions partnered with POP Life to expand FanXperience to Asia. Bryan Brandenburg stepped aside in May 2018 in response to criticism of how he handled a sexual harassment complaint. In 2019, Brandenburg devoted himself full-time to Zenerchi, a biotech company he founded in Salt Lake City.

== List of events ==
| Dates | Location | Attendance | Notable guests | Notes |
|---|---|---|---|---|
| September 5–7, 2013 | Salt Palace Convention Center | 70,000-80,000 | Adam West, Burt Ward, Claire Coffee, David Prowse, Dean Cain, Dirk Benedict, Glenn Morshower, Henry Winkler, John de Lancie, Kevin Sorbo, Lou Ferrigno, Manu Bennett, Peter Mayhew, Ray Park, Richard Hatch, Sofia Milos, Stan Lee, Weta Workshop, William Shatner, and over 100 other guests. | Salt Lake Comic Con was the largest convention ever held in Utah. The first Salt Lake Comic Con brought roughly $31 million to the state of Utah. |
| April 17–19, 2014 | Salt Palace Convention Center, The Gateway, Salt Lake Marriott Hotel Downtown at City Creek Center, Utah State Capitol | Over 100,000 | Aaron Douglas, Adam Baldwin, Billy Dee Williams, Bob Layton, Brent Spiner, Cassandra Peterson, Chandler Riggs, Charles Fleischer, Denise Crosby, Dexter Vines, Ed McGuinness, Edward James Olmos, Gates McFadden, Ioan Gruffudd, James Marsters, Jason David Frank, Jeremy Bulloch, Jon Bernthal, Jonathan Frakes, Julie Benz, Karen Gillan, Karl Urban, Kelly Hu, Laurie Holden, Marina Sirtis, Michael Dorn, Micky Dolenz, Nathan Fillion, Neal Adams, Patrick Stewart, Peter David, Sean Patrick Flanery, William Shatner, and over 100 other guests. | Salt Lake Comic Con FanXperience was the largest convention ever held in the state of Utah. |
| September 4–6, 2014 | Salt Palace Convention Center, The Gateway, Salt Lake Marriott Hotel Downtown at City Creek Center, Radisson Hotels Salt Lake City Downtown | Over 120,000 | Ernie Hudson, Bruce Campbell, John Barrowman, Sam Witwer, Cary Elwes, Eliza Dushku, Erin Gray, Lou Ferrigno, Kevin Sorbo, Michael Rosenbaum, Jason David Frank, Giancarlo Esposito, Vic Mignogna, Simon Helberg, Stephen Amell, Manu Bennett, Jon Heder, Neal Adams, Brandon Sanderson, David Farland, Weta Workshop, Barbara Eden, Alan Tudyk, James Hong, Hulk Hogan, Danny Glover, Charisma Carpenter, Kevin Conroy, Gigi Edgley, Matt Frewer, Patrick Warburton, Eve Myles, Craig Parker, Johnny Yong Bosch, Veronica Taylor, Eric Roberts, Colin Baker, Paul McGann, Grant Imahara, Ian Ziering, Ron Perlman, Leonard Nimoy (via Skype), Stan Lee and over 100 other guests. | |
| January 29–31, 2015 | Salt Palace Convention Center | Over 50,000 | Matt Smith, Karen Gillan, Billie Piper, Carrie Fisher, Christopher Lloyd, Felicia Day, Tom Felton, Steven Yeun, Emily Kinney, Laurie Holden, Lena Headey, Nikolaj Coster-Waldau, Brandon Routh, Ray Park, Paul Wesley, Phoebe Tonkin, Nichelle Nichols, Anthony Michael Hall, Mark Pellegrino, Alaina Huffman, Ralph Macchio, Glenn Morshower, RJ Mitte, Jim Cummings, Jess Harnell, Rob Paulsen, and over 100 other guests. | |
| September 24–26, 2015 | Salt Palace Convention Center | 127,000 | Chris Evans, Hayley Atwell, Sebastian Stan, Ian Somerhalder, Felicia Day, James and Oliver Phelps, John Barrowman, Jenna Coleman, Arthur Darvill, Sean Astin, Anthony Daniels, Scott Wilson, Marina Sirtis, Denis O'Hare, Dean O'Gorman, Kristin Bauer van Straten, Robbie Amell, Walter Koenig, Richard Hatch, Emma Caulfield, Linda Blair, Daniel Cudmore, Vic Mignogna, Emmanuelle Vaugier, Christopher Gorham, Austin St. John, Joel Hodgson, Bill Corbett, Trace Beaulieu, Frank Conniff, Jim Butcher, Timothy Zahn, James Dashner, R. A. Salvatore, Terry Brooks, Dee Bradley Baker, Jess Harnell, Rob Paulsen, Richard Paul Evans, Kevin Hearne and over 100 other guests. | The third annual Salt Lake Comic Con event broke its previous attendance records with 127,000 attendees. Salt Lake Comic Con 2015 also helped contribute to record breaking Utah Transit Authority ridership numbers with 567,892 boardings on TRAX (light rail) and FrontRunner. The event broke the Guinness World Record for the Most People Dressed as Comic Book Characters in one location with 1784 participants. Salt Lake Comic Con 2015 hosted the POP! Life World Tour Exhibition presented by Funko and Toy Tokyo. |
| March 24–26, 2016 | Salt Palace Convention Center | Over 50,000 | Buzz Aldrin, Gillian Anderson, Matt Smith, Jason Isaacs, Summer Glau, Chandler Riggs, Alex Kingston, Tom Kenny, Alan Tudyk, LeVar Burton, Mitch Pileggi, Dean Cain, Sylvester McCoy, Peter Davison, Bill Farmer, Jess Harnell, Paul Blackthorne, Charlotte Ross, Curtis Armstrong, Gary Lockwood, Michael Traynor, Don Shanks, Grey DeLisle, Erica Carroll, William B. Davis, Kate Beckinsale, Nick Carter, Tony Anselmo, Danai Gurira, Joey Fatone, Jeremy Renner, and over 100 other guests. | The sixth Salt Lake Comic Con event and the third annual FanXperience event. |
| September 1–3, 2016 | Salt Palace Convention Center | Over 120,000 | Mark Hamill, William Shatner, Stephen Amell, John Cena, Evanna Lynch, Ian Somerhalder, Paul Wesley, Robert Englund, Lou Ferrigno, Michael Rooker, Famke Janssen, Arthur Darvill, Billy Boyd, Millie Bobby Brown, Jim Beaver, John Schneider, Tom Wopat, Catherine Bach, Manu Bennett, David Ramsey, Jason David Frank, Jeremy Bulloch, Vic Mignogna, Phil LaMarr, Steve Blum, James Arnold Taylor, Fred Tatasciore, Jess Harnell, Liam McIntyre, Troy Baker, and over 100 other guests. | The fourth annual Salt Lake Comic Con event. |
| March 17–18, 2017 | Salt Palace Convention Center | 45,000 - 50,000 (est) | Stan Lee (via Skype), Cary Elwes, Wallace Shawn, Michael Cudlitz, Chris Sarandon, "Weird Al" Yankovic, John Rhys-Davies, Tara Strong, Khary Payton, Jess Harnell, Adrian Paul, Judge Reinhold, Bonnie Wright, James Roday, Dulé Hill, Jason Momoa, Emilie de Ravin, Holly Marie Combs, Josh McDermitt, Sean Maguire, Greg Grunberg, Verne Troyer, Adrienne Wilkinson, Brian Krause, Jennifer Hale, Amy Gumenick, Sam J. Jones, RJ Mitte, Zachary Levi, Christopher Lambert, Jeff Bennett, Marv Wolfman, Richard Paul Evans, Brandon Mull, and over 100 other guests. | The fourth annual FanXperience event and the first Salt Lake Comic Con FanXperience event to be held for two days. |
| September 21–23, 2017 | Salt Palace Convention Center | 75,000 - 100,000 (est) | Val Kilmer, John Cusack, Jon Bernthal, Christopher Lloyd, Richard Dean Anderson, John Barrowman, Catherine Tate, Wil Wheaton, Michael Rooker, Thomas F. Wilson, Ross Marquand, Eliza Dushku, Joonas Suotamo, Sean Gunn, Michael Rosenbaum, Nolan North, Christopher Sabat, Sean Schemmel, Eoin Macken, Jewel Staite, Corbin Bernsen, Will Friedle, Vic Mignogna, Jess Harnell, and dozens more. | The fifth annual Salt Lake Comic Con event. |
| September 6–8, 2018 | Salt Palace Convention Center | Approximately 110,000 | Jeff Goldblum, Karl Urban, Dave Bautista, Jason Momoa, Ian Mcdiarmid, Rainn Wilson, David Tennant, Evangeline Lilly, Chuck Norris, Tom Welling, Michael Rosenbaum, Jennifer Morrison, Gaten Matarazzo, Brent Spiner, John DiMaggio, Lucy Lawless, Karl Urban, Tim Curry, Mark Sheppard, John Wesley Shipp, Kevin Sorbo, Jason David Frank, Robby Benson, Amy Jo Johnson, Paige O’Hara, Tricia Helfer, Elizabeth Daily, and more were announced. | The sixth annual FanX Salt Lake Comic Convention event. The first event for which the expo has used the words "Comic Convention" instead of "Comic Con", following a lawsuit with San Diego Comic-Con. |
| April 19–20, 2019 | Salt Palace Convention Center | 45,000 - 50,000 (est) | Clark Gregg, Pom Klementieff, Mike Colter, Tye Sheridan, Lynda Carter, Warwick Davis, Val Kilmer, Aimee Garcia, John Cleese, Ricky Schroder, Austin St. John, and Angela Kinsey were announced. | FanX Spring was held in April as a two-day event with FanX Fall scheduled for the first week of September 2019. |
| September 5–7, 2019 | Salt Palace Convention Center | 85,000 - 95,000 (est) | Tom Holland, Hayden Christensen, Ian McDiarmid, Ross Marquand, Jason Isaacs, Rebecca Mader, Keifer Sutherland, Megan Follows, Chris Kirkpatrick, Joey Fatone, Lana Parrilla, Kel Mitchell, Linda Ballantyne, Billy Zane and Patrick Renna were announced. | |
| September 17–19, 2020 | Salt Palace Convention Center | Cancelled | Alan Ritchson, Keegan Connor Tracy, Jaleel White, Peter Cullen | FanX 2020 was originally scheduled to be held September 17–19, but was cancelled on July 10 due to the ongoing COVID-19 pandemic. |
| September 16–18, 2021 | Salt Palace Convention Center | | Will Friedle, Christopher Eccleston, William Zabka were announced. | |
| September 22–24, 2022 | Salt Palace Convention Center | | | |
| September 21–23, 2023 | Salt Palace Convention Center | | William Shatner, Cary Elwes, Giancarlo Esposito, Jess Harnell, and Tara Strong were announced. | |
| September 26–28, 2024 | Salt Palace Convention Center | | Dick Van Dyke, Mel Gibson, Elijah Wood, Sean Astin, Susan Sarandon, Bonnie Wright, Anthony Daniels and Wil Wheaton were announced. | |
| September 25–27, 2025 | Salt Palace Convention Center | 100,000+ | Ke Huy Quan, Danny Elfman, William Shatner, Catherine Tate, Billie Piper, Freema Agyeman, Chevy Chase, Beverly D'Angelo, Ian Somerhalder, Shantel VanSanten, Laz Alonso, Zachary Levi, Ben Barnes, Brad Garrett, John Rhys-Davies, Sean Astin, Miranda Otto, Cleavant Derricks, Jerry O'Connell, Lawrence Makoare, Tyler Hoechlin, Melissa Benoist, Linda Blair, Matthew Modine, Ross Marquand, Michael Rooker, Cooper Andrews, Garrett Hedlund, Frank Grillo, Andrew McCarthy, Henry Thomas, Henry Winkler, Don Most, Anson Williams, Thomas Lennon, Cedric Yarbrough, Nikki Reed, Emily Hampshire, Laura Prepon, Doug Jones, Vanessa Shaw, Omri Katz, Enrico Colantoni, Dylan McDermott, John Ratzenberger, Vicki Lawrence. Soleil Moon Frye, Debbe Dunning, Patricia Richardson, Richard Karn, Dana Wheeler-Nicholson, Dave Foley, Jason Faunt, Walter Emanuel Jones, Rick Worthy, Mick Foley, Lita, Sting, Ric Flair, May Hong, Tom Kenny, Alex Brightman, Richard Horvitz, Brandon Rogers, Bryce Pinkham, Vivian Nixon, Anika Noni Rose, Robbie Daymond, Ray Chase, Max Mittelman, Jennifer Hale, Sean Schemmel, Christopher Sabat, Dameon Clarke, Dee Bradley Baker, Greg Baldwin, Michaela Jill Murphy, Nolan North, Sarah Natochenny, Erica Schroeder, Jason Griffith, Lisa Ortiz, Jess Harnell, Kellen Goff, J. Michael Tatum, Brianna Knickerbocker, Maggie Robertson, Alejandro Saab, Pablo Hidalgo | |
| September 24-26, 2026 | Salt Palace Convention Center | TBA | Gene Simmons, Hayden Christensen, Alec Baldwin, Molly Ringwald, Rainn Wilson, Angela Kinsey, Helen Hunt, Ann-Margret, Mr. T, Jennifer Grey, Temuera Morrison, Sean Astin, John Rhys-Davies, Karl Urban, Chace Crawford, Jessie T. Usher, Giancarlo Esposito, Nia Vardalos, Richard Speight Jr., Mark Sheppard, Lou Diamond Phillips, Jason Patric, Kiefer Sutherland, Mckenna Grace, Mason Thames, Nick Swardson, Jerry Trainor, Nathan Kress, Drake Bell, Josh Peck, Sasha Pieterse, Jackson Rathbone, Ashley Greene, Zachary Levi, Brandon Routh, Christina Chong, Ethan Peck, Cooper Andrews, Larry Bagby, Mackenyu, Matthew Davis, Cara Buono, Kane Hodder, Adam Savage, Spencer Charnas, Bronson Pinchot, Jane Seymour, Joe Lando, Tyler Labine, Steve Burton, Amy Smart, Eva LaRue, Kevin Nash, Trish Stratus, Rachel Pizzolato, Peter Jacobson, George Newbern, Jack Osbourne, Janina Gavankar, E. G. Daily, Grey DeLisle, Jodi Benson, Paige O'Hara, Linda Larkin, Matthew Wood, Sam Witwer, Robbie Daymond, Laura Bailey, Travis Willingham, Sam Riegel, Taliesin Jaffe, Liam O'Brien, Harvey Guillén, Lilli Cooper, Joel Perez, Amir Talai, Blake Roman, Krystina Alabado, Vivienne Medrano, Kimiko Glenn, Keith David, Christian Borle, Rob Paulsen, Jess Harnell, Tress MacNeille, Maurice LaMarche, Michaela Jill Murphy, Roger Clark, Rob Wiethoff, May Hong, Roger L. Jackson, Steve Downes, Jen Taylor, Bryce Papenbrook, Cherami Leigh, Zach Aguilar, Aleks Le, Neil Kaplan, Tim Downie, Ben Starr, Kaiji Tang, Trina Nishimura, Lex Lang, AmaLee, Brina Palencia, Stephanie Sheh, Shannon Chan-Kent, Alessandro Juliani, Adam McArthur, Brad Swaile, Brian Drummond, Abby Trott, Sandy Fox, Alan Lee, Mela Lee, Jody Houser, G. Willow Wilson, J. M. DeMatteis, Brandon Sanderson | |
| March 11-13, 2027 | Salt Palace Convention Center | TBA | TBA | Expected to operate at half capacity as the Salt Palace prepares to undergo a multi-year renovation. |

== See also ==
- Fandom
- Science fiction convention
- Comic Art Convention
