= Access Software =

American video game developer

Indie Built, Inc.
- Formerly: Access Software, Inc.; (1982–2000); Salt Lake Games Studio; (2000–2003); Indie Games; (2003–2004)
- Type: Subsidiary
- Industry: Video games
- Founded: November 1982; 43 years ago
- Founders: Bruce Carver; Chris Jones
- Defunct: May 1, 2006
- Fate: Dissolved
- Headquarters: Salt Lake City, Utah, US
- Key people: Bruce Carver; (president; 1982–2003); Chris Jones; (CFO; 1982–1999); Steven D. ZoBell; (president; 2003–2006)
- Products: Beach Head series; Tex Murphy series; Links series; Top Spin series
- Parent: Microsoft; (1999–2000); Microsoft Game Studios; (2000–2004); Take-Two Interactive; (2004–2005); 2K; (2005–2006)

Indie Built, Inc., formerly known as Access Software, Salt Lake Games Studio and Indie Games, was an American video game developer based in Salt Lake City, Utah. Founded in November 1982 by Bruce Carver and Chris Jones, the company created the Beach Head, Links and Tex Murphy series, as well as Raid over Moscow. Access Software was acquired by Microsoft in April 1999, transitioning in name twice before being acquired by Take-Two Interactive in October 2004, who renamed it Indie Built. In January 2005, Access Software became part of Take-Two's 2K label. Following poor financial performance after the acquisition, Indie Built was closed down in May 2006.

TruGolf, a company that develops indoor golf simulators, was formerly a subsidiary of Access Software based on the display technology it had made for the Links games and spun out to its own company during the Microsoft acquisition. Following the closure by Take-Two, many of the studio's developers went to TruGolf. Separately, Jones has established Big Finish Games to continue the Tex Murphy series.

== History ==
=== As Access Software (1982–1999) ===
The former Access Software logo

In 1982, Bruce Carver, an engineer for Salt Lake City-based company Redd Engineering, created a sprite-editing program called Spritemaster. He presented the product to Steve Witzel, who operated Computers Plus, a retail computer store in Salt Lake City's Midvale suburb; Witzel provided Carver with several improvement suggestions for the program. After Carver had implemented these changes, he began selling them under the name "Access Software" through Computers Plus. The name was chosen Carver and some of his friends had searched through a dictionary, considering "Action Software" and "Center Soft" before sticking with "Access Software". In November that year, Carver, together with Chris Jones, incorporated Access Software with a starting capital of US$25,000. In its early days, Access Software operated out of Carver's basement.

One of Access' key products were a series of sprite-based golfing games in the Links. In 1984, while there were other golf games on the market, most used a top-down approach, while Bruce Carver wanted to create a game that was shown from behind the golfer. With little artistic skill among their team, the developers set up a small studio in the basement, projecting frame-by-frame VHS footage of Roger Carver's golf swing onto a clear sheet, tracing his outline onto the sheets as to then convert them into sprites within the Commodore 64 system. This became the basis of Leader Board, the first game considered part of the Links series, and would establish the behind-the-golfer view for most other golf simulation games that followed. As Access continued to develop the Links games for computers, they established a subsidiary, TruGolf, that created golf simulators, with Roger Carver overseeing this division.

=== As Salt Lake Games Studio and Indie Games (1999–2003) ===
In April 1999, Access Software was acquired by Microsoft for an undisclosed sum. Microsoft sought to acquire Access to gain its Links series of golf games; Access had created Microsoft Golf as one of the first games to run within the Microsoft Windows operating system based on Links 386 Pro. According to Steve Witzel, Microsoft looked to acquire Access after USA Today reviewed both Microsoft Golf and Links and rated the latter much higher; Microsoft thought it would be easier to buy Access than try to compete. Microsoft desired to produce a high-end line of golf games based on Links with Access, while offering Microsoft Golf as lower-budget titles. With the acquisition, Access's principal offices remained in Salt Lake City. Access divested itself of the TruGolf division and made the company its own entity with Microsoft's purchase.

Upon the formation of Microsoft Game Studios (then called Microsoft Games) in 2000, Microsoft rebranded Access Software as Salt Lake Games Studio. Initially working on products to for the personal computer, Salt Lake City Studio transitioned to Xbox versions of Links as well as the Amped snowboarding and Top Spin tennis sports games, following the console's introduction in 2002.

In 2003, Microsoft rebranded Salt Lake Games Studio as Indie Games. That year, Carver left the company to pursue new interests, eventually founding Carver Homes, a construction company, in 2004. He died from cancer on December 28, 2005.

=== As Indie Built (2004–2006) ===
Around 2004, Microsoft opted to leave the sports-game development market due to the impact of the Electronic Arts Sports (EA Sports) label, using their strength to produce sports-related games for the Xbox console. Microsoft had laid off about 76 employees with Microsoft Game Studios, and around August and September, sold Indie Games to Take-Two Interactive, who renamed the studio to Indie Built. Take-Two had been keen on challenging the dominance of EA Sports, and its acquisition of Indie Built was among US$80 million it had spent through 2005 acquiring developers. In early 2005, Take-Two Interactive established the publishing label 2K, which would henceforth manage its development studios for sports games, including Indie Built.

While part of Take-Two, Indie Built created sequels for Amped and Top Spin, but these titles were not strong successes. Take-Two's 2006 fiscal year was poor as the company was dealing with both Security and Exchange Commission investigations related to its past reporting, and harsh criticism for the Hot Coffee mod as part of Grand Theft Auto: San Andreas. Indie Built was closed in May 2006 by Take-Two as part of a re-alignment of its business strategy to overcome the weak fiscal year.

Following Indie Built's closure, most of the employees transitioned to TruGolf, helping to improve the golf simulations. Additionally, Jones and Conners established Big Finish Games in 2007, where they planned to continue more narrative games, including expanding the Tex Murphy series.

== Games developed ==
Year	Title
1983	Neutral Zone
1983	Beach Head
1984	The Scrolls of Abadon
1984	Ollie's Follies
1984	Raid over Moscow
1985	Beach Head II: The Dictator Strikes Back
1986	Leader Board
1986	Leader Board: Executive Edition
1986	10th Frame
1987	Leaderboard Tournament
1987	World Class Leader Board
1987	Echelon
1988	Heavy Metal
1989	Mean Streets
1990	Crime Wave
1990	Countdown
1990	Links: The Challenge of Golf
1991	Martian Memorandum
1992	Amazon: Guardians of Eden
1992	Links 386 Pro
1992	Microsoft Golf
1993	Microsoft Golf: Multimedia Edition
1994	Under a Killing Moon
1995	Links 386 CD
1995	Microsoft Golf 2.0
1996	Links LS 1997
1996	The Pandora Directive
1996	Microsoft Golf 3.0
1997	Tex Murphy: Overseer
1997	Links LS 1998
1998	Links LS 1999
1999	Links Extreme
1999	Links LS 2000
2000	Microsoft Golf 2001
2000	Links LS Classic
2000	Links 2001
2001	Amped: Freestyle Snowboarding
2002	Links 2003
2003	Links 2004
2003	Inside Pitch 2003
2003	Amped 2
2003	Top Spin
2005	Amped 3
2006	Top Spin 2
