= Hard metal =

Hard metal may refer to:

- A metal or alloy with high hardness
- Cemented carbide (widia), hard material used for machining
- Hard Metal, Yugoslav magazine dedicated to heavy metal music
- Most subgenres of heavy metal music

== See also ==
- Heavy metal (disambiguation)
