= Beach Head 2000 =

2000 video game

- Developers: Digital Fusion, Inc.
- Publisher: WizardWorks (Note: Mac OS version published by MacSoft, arcade version published by Global VR.)
- Platforms: Windows, Mac OS, Arcade
- Release: Windows: NA: June 13, 2000; Mac OS: NA: October 6, 2000; Arcade: NA: September 2001
- Genres: First-person shooter, shooting gallery
- Mode: Single-player

Beach Head 2000 is a first-person shooter game developed by Digital Fusion, and is a loose remake of the 1983 computer game Beach Head, it shares a similar premise, as players defend a beach against attack by utilizing a variety of weapons.

Originally released by WizardWorks for Microsoft Windows and MacSoft for Mac OS as a budget title, a version of the game was also produced for video arcades by Tsunami Visual Technologies, available in various motion simulation cabinets. Digital Fusion continues to sell the Windows version as a download via its website.

== Gameplay ==
Players must defend the beach from a variety of threats both on the ground and in the air.

Players take the role of the sole gunner defending a beach against invading enemy soldiers, tanks, helicopters and other military attack vehicles. The player utilizes a variety of weapons, including a gun turret with a machine gun, howitzer cannon and guided surface-to-air missiles. A handgun is available as a final means of defense. The mouse is used to aim. Additional ammo and health are available by shooting packages dropped with parachutes. Missions end when all enemies are defeated, each mission changes the spawn point of enemies on the beach. There are infinite missions and the game has no ending.

== Reception ==
Reception

Aggregate score
Aggregator	Score
Metacritic	46/100

Review scores
Publication	Score
AllGame	2/5
CNET Gamecenter	5/10
Computer Games Strategy Plus	2/5
Computer Gaming World	3.5/5
EP Daily	7.5/10
GameSpot	3.9/10
GameZone	6.5/10
IGN	6/10
MacLife	(Mac) "Blech!"
PC Gamer (US)	18%
Maxim	2/5

The PC version received "generally unfavorable reviews" according to the review aggregation website Metacritic. GameSpot said that the game becomes repetitive when taking out the stream of enemies in each level. A review in AllGame said that "the initial appeal of Beach Head 2000's single view wears off very quickly" and compared it unfavorably to the original Beach Head. Inside Mac Games commented that the game was not worth the relatively low price, even among a limited selection of Mac OS games. However, IGN had a more positive reaction to the game, comparing it to Missile Command and calling it "strangely addicting".

The PC version was nominated for the "Worst Game of the Year" award at GameSpot's Best and Worst of 2000 Awards, which went to Blaze and Blade: Eternal Quest. It was also nominated for the "Best Sound in a PC Game" award at The Electric Playground's Blister Awards 2000, which went to Deus Ex.

== Sequels ==
Digital Fusion produced several sequels, Beach Head 2002, Beach Head Desert War, and Baghdad Central Desert Gunner. Global VR would take over the license from Tsunami and produce arcade versions of the first three games in the series.
