= Dan Farr =

American technology entrepreneur

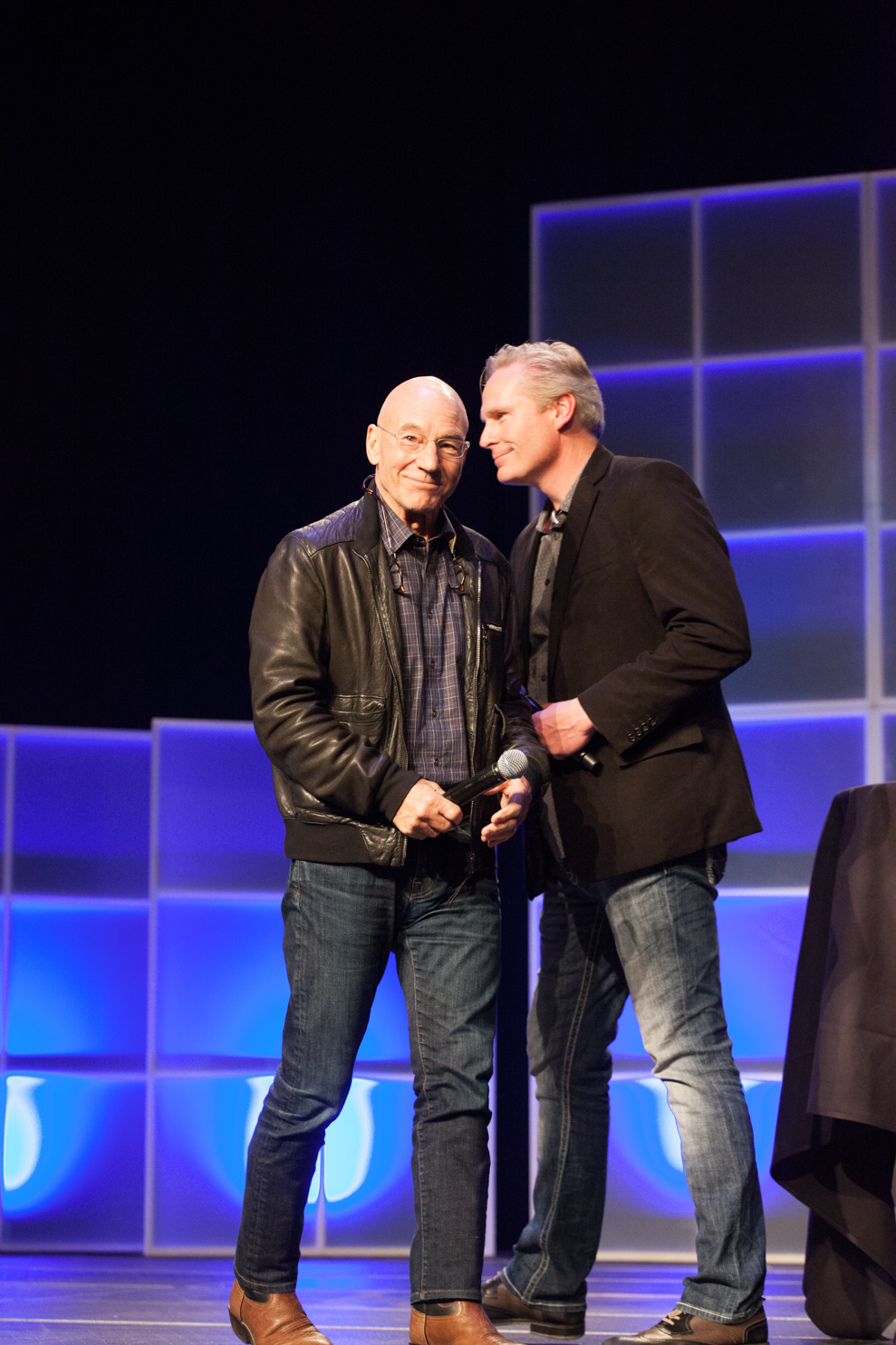
Dan Farr (right) with Patrick Stewart at the Salt Lake Comic Con FanXperience in 2014

Dan Farr (born February 15, 1967) is an American technology entrepreneur. He is known as co-founder of Daz 3D, a 3D content and software company, and for founding Salt Lake Comic Con.

== Career ==
Dan Farr co-founded Daz 3D Inc. in 2000. It develops and publishes 3D digital content and software for creative professionals and hobbyists. Two of the products Farr helped create while at DAZ were Daz Studio and Genesis Platform.

In 2005 Farr, along with his partners at Daz 3D, created an illustrated Christmas book entitled Mr. Finnegan’s Giving Chest using Daz 3D's products and featured actor Dick Van Dyke.

Shortly after leaving Daz 3D in the spring of 2012, Farr began planning Salt Lake Comic Con, a biannual comic book convention. The name of the convention was changed to FanX after a lawsuit was filed by Comic-Con International (CCI), the nonprofit that runs San Diego Comic-Con. In 2018, Farr announced he would reduce his roles in FanX after allegedly mishandling a sexual harassment complaint.
