= Beach Head (video game) =

1983 video game

Beach-Head
- Developer: Access Software: Sculptured Software (Apple) Ocean Software (CPC, Spec) Anirog Software (C16, Plus/4) Orpheus (MSX) D&L Research (Thomson)
- Publishers: NA: Access Software; EU: U.S. Gold; EU: Eaglesoft (MSX); EU: France Image Logiciel (Thomson)
- Designers: Bruce Carver; Kevin Homer
- Platforms: Acorn Electron, Amstrad CPC, Atari 8-bit, Apple II, BBC Micro, Commodore 16 & Plus/4, Commodore 64, Enterprise, MSX, Thomson MO5, Thomson TO7/70, ZX Spectrum
- Release: 1983
- Genre: Shoot 'em up
- Modes: Single-player, multiplayer

Beach-Head is a video game developed and published in 1983 by Access Software for the Atari 8-bit computers and Commodore 64 in the US. Versions for the ZX Spectrum, BBC Micro, and Acorn Electron (as well as the Atari and C64 versions) were published in Europe by U.S. Gold in 1984, followed by versions for the Amstrad CPC, Commodore 16, and Plus/4 in 1985.

== Gameplay ==
Tank on the run to the enemy gun

The game's setting is the Pacific Ocean theater of World War II. Gameplay consists of several varying stages in which the player must control various vehicles including warships and tanks in order to defeat an enemy fleet, break through enemy beach defences and destroy an enormous gun-emplacement to win the game. The gun emplacement requires multiple hits to be destroyed, but traverses faster than tanks can aim and fire, so it cannot be destroyed in a single attempt. In order to complete the game multiple tanks must make it through to the final level.

== Reception ==
Beach-Head was Access' best-selling Commodore game as of late 1987. It was the first U.S. Gold release to sell 250,000 copies.

Ahoy! stated "This game is a blast". It praised the graphics and concluded: "It is a remarkable programming achievement". Compute! listed the game in May 1988 as one of "Our Favorite Games", stating that it was superior to its "many imitators".

Zzap!64 reviewed the game in a retrospective feature in October 1985. They argued that although it was considered impressive at the time of release it had already become dated, and was rated 70% overall.

In 1996, Computer Gaming World declared Beach Head the 117th-best computer game ever released.

== Legacy ==
A sequel, Beach Head II: The Dictator Strikes Back, was released in 1985. A version of the game for Amiga was planned, but was cancelled when an agreement to publish with U.S. Gold could not be reached. In 2000, a loose remake of the game, Beach Head 2000, was released for the Windows and MacOS platforms.
