= Beach Head 2002 =

2002 video game

- Developer: Digital Fusion
- Publishers: Digital Fusion; Windows; Infogrames, Inc. Mac OS; MacSoft
- Platforms: Arcade, Mac OS, Windows
- Release: NA: June 15, 2002
- Genres: First-person shooter, shooting gallery
- Mode: Single-player

Beach Head 2002 is a war game developed by Digital Fusion in which the player controls the defenses in a bunker to hold off an enemy assault, and is a sequel to Beach Head 2000.

== Gameplay ==
Taking control of the defenses of a bunker during an assault, the player utilises a variety of weapons to defeat their enemies, including airstrikes and other military equipment. Enemies arrive in stages to surround the player. Players can use different combat techniques, such as illuminating the field of battle, to defeat the enemies. One of the challenges of the games is shooting down aerial targets. Some weapons are unavailable in certain stages.

== Reception ==
Metacritic, a review aggregator, rated the PC version of the game 46/100 based on five reviews. Trey Walker of GameSpot wrote that Beach Head 2002 delivers arcade-style shooting in its most basic and repetitive form. Walker said the game "gets old quickly" and not an improvement over Beach Head 2000, though it is "visually pleasing". GameZone rated it 7/10 stars and praised the game's simplicity of design, though the reviewer said it "will appeal to a small niche of gamers" due to the lack of re-playability. Tim Warner of Gamezilla rated it 47/100 and called it "a dismal attempt at a resurrection of an age-old favorite genre", criticizing the sluggish aiming, limited weapon choices, low-end graphics, and audio. Reviewing the OS X version, Christopher Paretti of Inside Mac Games rated it 5.75/10 and wrote that it is fine for casual play during a break but recommended a more intellectual puzzle game instead.

== Sequels ==
Digital Fusion produced two sequels: Beach Head Desert War and Baghdad Central Desert Gunner. Global VR would take over the license from Tsunami and produce arcade versions of the first three games in the series.

== See also ==
- Beach Head 2000
