= Heavy Metal (1988 video game) =

1988 video game

- European cover art
- Developer: Access Software
- Publisher: Access Software
- Platforms: Amiga, Amstrad CPC, Atari ST, Commodore 64, MS-DOS, ZX Spectrum
- Release: 1988: C64; 1989: MS-DOS; 1990: Amiga, CPC, Spectrum, ST
- Genre: Action
- Mode: Single-player

Heavy Metal is an action video game published for the Commodore 64 in 1988. by Access Software. It was converted to MS-DOS, Amiga, Amstrad CPC, Atari ST, MS-DOS, and ZX Spectrum.

== Gameplay ==
Heavy Metal is a wargame which includes elements of arcade action with aspects of simulation and strategy games.

== Reception ==
Ronald F. Williams reviewed the game for Computer Gaming World and stated "Heavy Metal has the high level graphics, sound and action that delight arcade enthusiasts of all ages, and offers a challenge to the budding strategist. It should be therapeutic excitement for gamers needing a momentary break from more cerebral games and be of special interest to those who collect games of artistic craftsmanship."
