= Crime Wave (video game) =

1990 video game

- Developer: U.S. Gold
- Publisher: Access Software
- Platforms: PC, Atari ST, Amiga
- Release: 1990
- Genre: Run and gun
- Mode: Single-player

Crime Wave is a 1990 video game developed by U.S. Gold and published by Access Software.

== Gameplay ==
Crime Wave places the player in control of Lucas McCabe, who moves through a series of arcade‑style action stages set in a crime‑ridden city. Before each segment, comic‑book story panels introduce characters and events. Gameplay consists of progressing through city environments while shooting waves of enemies who attack with visible projectiles. The player uses high‑tech weapons and must avoid incoming fire. Throughout the stages, defeating enemies triggers digitized cutscenes that advance the narrative. The game includes multiple difficulty levels that determine how long the player can continue before losing all lives. A mode is available that removes story sequences and includes only the action stages.

== Reception ==
Richard Sheffield writing for Compute! concluded that "Crime Wave is another example of a game that probably couldn't be played on today's videogame systems. It's big, it's action-packed, and it's graphically sophisticated. It will wash you away." Computer and Video Games compared it to Narc and said that "if you're a fan of the NARC coin-op, and you don't mind the slightly slow pace of the action, take a look." S.F. Sparrow for PC Games said that "Crime Wave comes close to the power and intensity of full-size arcade games. Arcade enthusiasts will simply feast on it.

French magazine Tilt gave it a grade of D. German magazine Play Time rated the ST version at 70% and the PC version 69%, while Power Play gave it only 38%, and Aktueller Software Markt gave it a rating of only 2 out of 10.
