= List of Acclaim Entertainment subsidiaries =

Acclaim Entertainment was an American video game publisher from Long Island, active from 1987 until filing for Chapter 7 bankruptcy on September 1, 2004. Through a series of acquisitions between 1990 and 2002, Acclaim built itself a large portfolio of subsidiaries acting in the fields of development and publishing.

== Development ==
=== Acclaim Studios ===
Acclaim Studios was established in July 1998 to organize all Acclaim-owned development studios under one management. In May 1999, all underlying studios were uniformly rebranded to bear the "Acclaim Studios" prefix. Acclaim Studios and all of its development facilities were closed on August 27, 2004.

=== Acclaim Studios Austin ===
Acclaim Studios Austin (formerly Iguana Entertainment) was based in Austin, Texas. The company was founded in 1991 by Jeff Spangenberg, previously lead designer for Punk Development, and originally located in Santa Clara, California. Iguana found first success with Aero the Acro-Bat, moved to Austin and acquired Optimus Software (later Iguana UK) in 1993. Iguana was acquired by Acclaim in January 1995 and received another sub-studio, Iguana West (formerly Sculptured Software) in October that year. Spangenberg was fired from his position in July 1998 and filed a lawsuit on breach of contract the following October. Iguana was rebranded Acclaim Studios Austin in May 1999, and the studio was closed down in August 2004.

=== Acclaim Studios Cheltenham ===
Acclaim Studios Cheltenham was based in Cheltenham, England. The studio was founded in 2000 by former employees of Psygnosis' South West studio.

=== Acclaim Studios London ===
Acclaim Studios London was based in Croydon, England. The company was founded in 1984 by Fergus McGovern and Vakis Paraskeva under the name Probe Software, which was later renamed Probe Entertainment. By 1988, the company employed 72 people. Several games developed by Probe included references to McGovern's name or likeness, including the sentence "Is that you, Fergus?" presented to players of Trantor: The Last Stormtrooper upon gaining a low score. The company specialized in the development of arcade game ports and movie tie-ins, including Out Run, Mortal Kombat and FIFA Soccer.

On October 10, 1995, Acclaim agreed to acquire Probe for 1,732 shares of common stock. The deal closed on October 16 and was valued at US$40 million, making McGovern a millionaire. The same year, McGovern also received a Lifetime Achievement Award for his work at Probe. McGovern left the company a few years later to found HotGen, also a video game developer. With the consolidation of Acclaim Studios' branding in May 1999, Probe was renamed Acclaim Studios London. Acclaim Studios London was closed in April 2000.

=== Acclaim Studios Manchester ===
Acclaim Studios Manchester was founded in Manchester as Software Creations, a sole trader company, by Richard Kay in 1985. The following year, the company was joined by Steve Ruddy, who began working on Commodore 64 conversions of games like Mystery of the Nile and Kinetik. Subsequently, further employees, including the Follin brothers and Mike Ager, followed after Ruddy and joined Software Creations. Successful titles produced or ported by Software Creations include Bubble Bobble (1987), Bionic Commando (1988), and Tin Star (1994). After developing ports of Ghouls 'n Ghosts and LED Storm in 1989, Software Creations moved into custom-built offices located within Manchester. The Pickford brothers, John and Ste, joined the company in 1990, producing Equinox and Plok. In 1994, Software Creations was acquired by BCE Multimedia and became part of Rage Software.

On May 1, 2002, Acclaim announced that they had acquired Software Creations, which was renamed Acclaim Studios Manchester. At the time, Software Creations had approximately 70 employees. Acclaim Studios Manchester was closed as part of Acclaim Studios and all of its development facilities on August 27, 2004. Rod Cousens and Barry Jafrato, who were chief executive officer and head of publishing, respectively, for Acclaim, announced in September 2004 that they were planning to create a new video game publisher, Exclaim, with the help of Europlay Capital Advisers. Exclaim was set to acquire and reinstantiate Acclaim's two UK studios, namely Manchester and Cheltenham, and re-employ their roughly 160. Exclaim's opening was expected on October 11, however, Cousen's ownership over the two studios was challenged by Acclaim's liquidator, Allan Mendelsohn, leaving the UK staff in a state of limbo. A successor to Acclaim Studios Manchester, SilverBack Studios, was founded by Jon Oldham in April 2005 and employed 15 former Acclaim Studios Manchester staff.

=== Acclaim Studios Salt Lake City ===
Acclaim Studios Salt Lake City, based in Salt Lake City, Utah, was founded as Sculptured Software by George Metos, Bryan Brandenburg, Peter Adams, Mike Macris and Bob Burgener, and incorporated on July 12, 1985. Games developed by Sculptured Software include the Super Star Wars series; Super NES ports of Doom, Mortal Kombat, Mortal Kombat II, and Mortal Kombat 3; and the Genesis and MS-DOS versions of Mortal Kombat 3.

Acclaim agreed to acquire Sculptured Software on October 9, 1995, and closed the deal the following day. The deal included a transaction of 1,013 shares of common stock, valued at $30 million. By February 1996, Sculptured Software employed 140 employees, and all founders but Metos had left the company. Metos left the company the following year to found Kodiak Interactive Software Studios. By December 1997, Sculptured Software was renamed Iguana West. The renaming reflected a major change in the management which involved the former Sculptured Software being overseen by the president of Iguana Entertainment. With the consolidation of Acclaim Studios' branding in May 1999, Iguana West was renamed Acclaim Studios Salt Lake City. Acclaim Studios Salt Lake City was dissolved as a cost-cutting exercise in December 2002. Through the closure, 70 employees were laid off and an unannounced title was canceled, while the remaining staff and the development of a third installment in the Legends of Wrestling series were shifted to Acclaim Studios Austin.

=== Acclaim Studios Stroud ===
Acclaim Studios Stroud was formed in July 1999 to focus on the development of PlayStation games. Led by Neil Duffield, the studio's team was made up of 26 staff formerly employed by Psygnosis. The studio likely closed after only a short time, as they were not listed in Acclaim's company list in January 2000.

=== Acclaim Studios Teesside ===
Acclaim Studios Teesside was based in Stockton-on-Tees, England. The company was founded in February 1988 by brothers Darren and Jason Falcus, at the time aged 19 and 18, under the name Optimus Software. The company was located in Stockton, where the brothers were born. The founders had started programming in 1981, and released their first game, Castle of Doom, in 1983. Games released by Optimus Software generated retail sales in excess of US$500 million. These games included Big Nose the Caveman and the Seymour series, both of which they developed for Codemasters.

In 1993, Optimus Software was acquired by Iguana Entertainment to undisclosed terms. The company moved to new offices in Middlesbrough, and was renamed Iguana UK. Iguana Entertainment itself was acquired by Acclaim in 1995, and Iguana UK moved back to Stockton. Under the new banner, Iguana UK and the Falcus brothers developed the Shadow Man series, home console versions of various NBA Jam titles, and the Nintendo 64 version of Forsaken. With the consolidation of Acclaim Studios' branding in May 1999, Iguana UK was renamed Acclaim Studios Teesside. The Falcus brothers left the company in February 2000 and founded Atomic Planet Entertainment. At that time, the studio had 75 employees. The studio was closed in May 2002.

== Publishing ==
=== Acclaim Coin-Operated Entertainment ===
Acclaim Coin-Operated Entertainment was an Acclaim subsidiary based in Mountain View, California, that focused on releasing coin-operated arcade games. It was established in July 1994. Leon Deith was sales director for the company, as of January 1998. Acclaim Coin-Operated Entertainment was closed in March 1998, as Acclaim wanted to shift development resources to Acclaim Studios closer to the company's headquarters in New York City.

=== Acclaim Distribution ===
Acclaim Distribution was established in June 1993 to act as the distributor for Acclaim. Companies that partnered with Acclaim Distribution for distribution services include Digital Pictures, Marvel Entertainment, Sound Source Interactive, Sunsoft, and Interplay Productions.

=== Lazer-Tron ===
Lazer-Tron Corporation focused on the production of coin-operated "redemption games". The company was acquired by Acclaim on August 31, 1995, in exchange of 1,123 shares of Acclaim's common stock. Acclaim sold off all assets of Lazer-Tron on March 5, 1997, for $6,000,000 in cash.

=== Flying Edge ===
Flying Edge was a division of Acclaim that was founded in 1992 to publish games on Sega consoles. The name was dropped in 1994 in favor of the Acclaim name.

=== Arena Entertainment ===
Arena Entertainment was a division formed under Mirrorsoft in 1991, to publish games on Sega platforms. The company was initially formed in April 1991 a joint venture with Spectrum HoloByte, which is owned by Sphere, Inc., an affiliate of the Mirror Group, before Acclaim bought out Mirrorsoft in 1992 and took over the whole company, as well as Spectrum HoloByte's stake in Arena. Like Flying Edge, the name was dropped in favor of the Acclaim name in 1994.

=== Acclaim Sports ===
Acclaim Sports was established as a division of Acclaim in November 1997, as part of a $4 million–$6 million marketing campaign for NFL Quarterback Club '98. Acclaim stated that the creation of the target specifically targeted challenging Electronic Arts' EA Sports label. Bob Picunko was appointed director of marketing of Acclaim Sports.

=== Club Acclaim ===
Club Acclaim was a division of Acclaim announced in January 2000, originally for a line of Game Boy Color games directed towards a younger audience. Club Acclaim's most successful games were those based on Mary-Kate and Ashley Olsen.

=== AKA Acclaim ===
AKA Acclaim was an extreme sports division of the company. It was originally launched in May 2000 as Acclaim Max Sports amid the popularity of the genre.
