= Beach Head II: The Dictator Strikes Back =

1985 video game

- Developers: Access Software; Sculptured Software (Apple, Atari); Ocean Software (CPC, Spectrum)
- Publishers: NA: Access Software; EU: U.S. Gold
- Director: Bruce Carver
- Producer: Chris Jones
- Programmers: Roger Carver; Bruce Carver
- Platforms: Amstrad CPC, Apple II, Atari 8-bit, Commodore 64, ZX Spectrum
- Release: 1985
- Genre: Shoot 'em up
- Modes: Single-player, multiplayer

Beach Head II: The Dictator Strikes Back (also punctuated as Beach-Head II) is 1985 shoot 'em up video game for the Commodore 64, a sequel to Beach Head, developed and published by Access Software. It was designed by Bruce Carver and his brother, Roger, and was released for the Amstrad CPC, Apple II, Atari 8-bit computers, Commodore 64, and ZX Spectrum.

== Gameplay ==
Gameplay screenshot (Atari 8-bit)

Beach-Head II features the player pursuing the eponymous Dictator in several ways. There are four levels in the game. In the first level, called Attack, the player deploys soldiers along a path with walls to cover him from the dictator's gun. The objective is to destroy the gun. The second level involves rescuing the prisoners from deadly obstacles by clearing them with a gun. The third level's objective is to escape from the area by flying a helicopter with the prisoners out of the dictator's fortress. Finally the player and the dictator face off, on opposite cliffs, separated by water. To defeat him, the player must make him fall in the water by throwing knives at him. The Dictator tries to do the same to the player.

In one-player mode there are three skill levels, harder modes resulting in faster movements and the computer opponent using better artificial intelligence. In two-player mode, one player controls the usual side whilst his opponent controls the Dictator's forces.

This game was notable for using synthesized speech (courtesy of Electronic Speech Systems, then of Berkeley, California). It is known for its deathly scream (also heard in Epyx's Impossible Mission), laughing, "I'm hit", "Medic", "Hey! Don't shoot me" and "You can't hurt me".

== Reception ==
Reception

Review scores
Publication	Score
Zzap!64	90% (C64)
Crash	74% (Spectrum)

Ahoy! reviewed the Commodore 64 version of Beach Head II, and stated that the first minigame, "Attack", was the best, but criticized the illogic of a player who chooses to control the Dictator still having to ferry people to safety in "Rescue". The review summarized Beach-Head II as "one of the best head-to-head games for the Commodore, and the computer makes a powerful solitaire opponent". ANALOG Computing was more critical, calling the Atari version of the game 'mediocre', with "acceptable" graphics and "little action".

Zzap!64 gave the Commodore 64 version of the game an overall score of 90%, calling it an improvement over its predecessor, and praised its "fantastic" graphics, "state-of-the-art" animations, and "first-class" synthesized speech. Zzap! praised Beach Head II's "varied" and "fun" action arcade gameplay, as well as its two-player mode, further calling the game "an absolute must". Zzap!'s sister magazine, Crash, gave the ZX Spectrum version of Beach Head II a more modest 74%, with one reviewer criticizing it as 'lacking replayability', while another praised its "varied" gameplay. Crash further criticized Beach Head II, expressing that while its graphics are "crude", they work well, further stating that the Commodore 64 version's best qualities are its speech and graphics, which are missing in the Spectrum port, leaving a "pretty simple and boring game".
