= World Class Leader Board =

1987 video game

- Developers: Access Software; Tiertex (Master System, Game Gear, Genesis)
- Publishers: Access Software; U.S. Gold (Master System, Game Gear, Genesis)
- Series: Leader Board
- Platforms: Acorn Archimedes, Amiga, Amstrad CPC, Apple II, Atari ST, Commodore 64, Macintosh, Master System, Game Gear, Genesis, ZX Spectrum
- Release: 1987
- Genre: Sports

World Class Leader Board is a 1987 golf video game published by Access Software. It is part of the Leader Board series.

== Gameplay ==
World Class Leader Board is a game in which the courses include St. Andrews, Doral and Cypress Creek, and a fourth fictional one called Gauntlet.

== Reception ==
Rick Teverbaugh reviewed the game for Computer Gaming World, and stated that "WCLB is a son that follows right in the footsteps of the father. The game play is smooth."

David M. Wilson and Johnny L. Wilson reviewed the game for Computer Gaming World, and stated that "WCLB does not show the player how much force is being applied on the power graph. Instead, the professional player is expected to have an intuitive grasp of the extent of his stroke. This is a very challenging facet of the game."
