= Leader Board =

1986 golf video game

- Commodore 64/128 cover art
- Developer: Access Software
- Publishers: NA: Access Software; EU: U.S. Gold
- Designers: Bruce Carver; Roger Carver
- Platforms: Commodore 64/128, Atari 8-bit, Amstrad CPC, Amstrad PCW, ZX Spectrum, Amiga, Atari ST, Apple II, MS-DOS, Mac, Master System, Game Gear, Genesis, Archimedes
- Release: 1986; 1987 (World Class)
- Genre: Sports
- Modes: Single-player, multiplayer

Leader Board (sometimes Leaderboard) is a series of golf simulation video games that was developed by Bruce Carver and Roger Carver, and published by Access Software.

== Summary ==
Teeing off on the first hole (Atari ST)

Leader Board, the first game in the series, was released in 1986 and included four different water-based courses. It was well received, being rated as 97% overall by Zzap!64 magazine and being prized with their "Gold Award". It was also highly rated by other magazines, with Your Sinclair rating it 9 out of 10, Sinclair User giving it five stars, and Crash rating it 80%.

Leaderboard Tournament, released the same year, was a series of expansion disks each containing four new courses.

The second game in the series was Leader Board: Executive Edition, which was released in 1987 and contained new landscape and course features, such as trees and bunkers. Despite these additions, the game was less well received than its predecessor, being given an overall rating of 72% by Zzap!64 magazine.

World Class Leader Board was the last game in the series and included four courses; Cypress Creek, Doral Country Club, St Andrews, and the fictional Gauntlet Country Club. Three course expansion disks were later released. Special features in this final version included a course overview (overhead view), the punch shot, a printable score card, the use of RealSound, and a course editor which allowed changes to be made to the existing courses. It was considered a vast improvement on Executive, being given a 94% overall rating by Zzap!64 magazine, and 9 out of 10 by Your Sinclair.

== Reception ==
Reception

Review score
Publication	Score
Zzap!64	97%

Awards
Publication	Award
Sinclair User	SU Classic
Your Sinclair	Megagame

Leaderboard was the best-selling Commodore 64 game of 1986 in the United Kingdom. Leader Board was Access' third best-selling Commodore game as of late 1987.

Rick Teverbaugh of Computer Gaming World said of the Commodore 64 version that "Leader Board has the most realistic putting feel of any golf game I've ever tried. When the ball finally makes it into the cup, the sound of that success is also amazingly realistic". Compute!'s Gazette praised the Commodore 64 version's realism and amazing ("there is no other word for it") graphics. While noting Leader Board's use of only water hazards, and no difference in color between the fairway and green, the magazine concluded that it "is fun, a lot of fun, and as addicting as the real game".

Computer Gaming World stated that Leader Board for the Amiga improved on the Commodore 64 version, and praised the graphics, but preferred the also-outstanding Mean 18. Info gave the Amiga version four stars out of five, liking the gameplay and "nicely done graphics" but noting the absence of a practice green or course construction. The magazine concluded, "It's tough to choose between this and Mean 18".

Antic wrote that the Atari ST version "will keep you happy for hours", praising its graphics. While noting deviations from the rules of golf, the reviewer concluded recommending Leader Board "as an entertaining game for anyone, regardless of skill and knowledge of golf". The magazine said that the Atari 8-bit version "was good enough to almost make you forget about the ST game" with "top-class" graphics, albeit lacking roughs, bunkers, or trees. Antic concluded that "Leader Board is a fun game whether or not you actually play golf", and that its only flaw was that it would keep players from being "outside in the fresh air".
